= Penny dreadful (disambiguation) =

A penny dreadful is a 19th-century British fiction publication that cost a penny.

Penny Dreadful or Penny Dreadfuls may also refer to:

== Fictional characters ==
- Penny Dreadful, a character in the Terry Brooks novel Angel Fire East
- Penny Dreadful (comics), a DC Comics super-villain and member of the comic book team Helix
- Penny Dreadful, a character from Skybound's Witch Doctor comics

== Music ==
- "Penny Dreadful", a song by Skyclad from the 1996 album Irrational Anthems
- "Penny Dreadfuls", a song by Animal Collective from the 2000 album Spirit They're Gone, Spirit They've Vanished

== Other arts and media ==
- Penny Dreadful (film), a 2006 American horror film
- Penny Dreadful (novel), a novel by Will Christopher Baer
- Penny Dreadful (TV series), a 2014 Showtime television series
  - Penny Dreadful: City of Angels, a 2020 spin-off of the 2014 series
- The Penny Dreadfuls, a British sketch-comedy troupe

== Other uses ==
- Penny Dreadful XIII, a New England television horror host
- Penny dreadful, inexpensive shares in trading noted for being highly volatile

== See also ==
- Penny the Dreadful, a 2014 album by Those Mockingbirds
- Pulp magazines
