= Close Counts =

Studio album by The Brixton Riot
- Released: 6 October 2017
- Studio: Magpie Cage
- Genre: Alternative rock, indie rock
- Length: 36:15
- Label: Mint 400 Records
- Producer: J. Robbins

The Brixton Riot chronology
| Palace Amusements (2012) | Close Counts (2017) |

Close Counts is the second studio album from the American rock band the Brixton Riot.

== Content ==
The eleven-track album was digitally released with Mint 400 Records on 6 October 2017, and self-released on compact disc. The basic tracks were recorded live on tape in twenty hours, over a course of two days, and it was engineered by J. Robbins at his Baltimore-based studio, Magpie Cage. Robbins also provides backing vocals on the opening track, "Can't Stop Now." The band explains "we spent a lot of time getting the arrangements and parts finalized before recording[;] we recorded an entire "demo version" of the record before we went into the studio." The album is described as a blend of power pop and alt rock, and it draws comparison to the music of Superdrag, Sugar, Big Star, and Teenage Fanclub. The song "Little Sparks" predates their first release, Sudden Fiction.

The record release party was held at Asbury Yacht Club with Dentist, and the Rock N Roll Hi Fives, and hosted by CoolDad Music. The lead track "Can't Stop Now" appears on the 2018 Mint 400 Records compilation album, NJ / NY Mixtape.

== Reception ==
Dagger calls the album "straight ahead tunes with punchy guitars," noting "Jerry Lardieri has a smooth croon." Bob Makin in Institute for Nonprofit News calls out two of the tracks, "The Ballad of Pete Best" and "Little Spark" as "exceptional nuggets." He describes "Little Spark" as a "love song for vinyl junkies in the spirit of "Left of the Dial," adding that the song boasts "a Jam/Style Council-like Motown-inspired bassline from the effortlessly talented Steve Hass; the tune also sports one of the best verses this year by a local band." The album was ranked No. 9 by Makin in The Aquarian Weekly's Top Albums of 2017.

A review by James Damion in Jersey Beat says "it's go-time the moment the bass line meets up with the opening guitar riff meet on the album's opening track "Can't Stop Now;" one can't help but rejoice in its statement of purpose and declaration of being," adding that "there's a sense of warmth that seems to wrap itself around every Brixton Riot song."

== Track listing ==
| No. | Title | Length |
|---|---|---|
| 1. | "Can't Stop Now" | 4:04 |
| 2. | "Slow Evolution" | 2:58 |
| 3. | "Easier Said Than Done" | 2:51 |
| 4. | "Hector Quasar" | 3:07 |
| 5. | "The Ballad of Pete Best" | 3:23 |
| 6. | "Caroline" | 3:47 |
| 7. | "Maybe Tomorrow" | 2:16 |
| 8. | "Little Spark" | 4:17 |
| 9. | "Move On" | 2:39 |
| 10. | "Talk About Nothing" | 3:20 |
| 11. | "Surrender to the Void" | 3:33 |
| Total length: | | 36:15 |

== Personnel ==
- Steve Hass – bass and vocals
- Matt Horutz – drums
- Jerry Lardieri – vocals and guitar
- Mark Wright – guitar

=== Additional musicians ===
- J. Robbins – backing vocals on "Can't Stop Now" and tambourine on "Hector Quasar"
- Alejandra Rodriguez – backing vocals on "Maybe Tomorrow"
