= Gold Glitter Shoes =

EP by Rock N Roll Hi Fives
- Released: 16 June 2015
- Studio: Moonlight Mile Recordings in Jersey City, New Jersey
- Genre: Rock and roll, indie rock
- Length: 27:15
- Label: Self-released
- Producer: Mike Moebius

Rock N Roll Hi Fives chronology
Make it Happen (2014)	Gold Glitter Shoes (2015)	The Beat the Sound the Dragon's Roar (2016)

Gold Glitter Shoes is the second studio EP from the American rock band Rock N Roll Hi Fives.

== Content ==
The seven-track EP was self-released as a digital download, on 16 June 2015. It was recorded and mixed at Moonlight Mile Recordings in Jersey City, New Jersey, by Mike Moebius, and mastered at Joe Lambert Mastering in Jersey City by Joe Lambert. Gold Glitter Shoes contains six original songs, and a cover of "We Got the Beat" by the Go-Go's. The album draws comparison to the music of Joan Jett. Several of the songs on the album appear on Rock N Roll Hi Fives' debut album Re-introducing the RocknRoll Hi-Fives.

== Reception ==
A review of Gold Glitter Shoes in Star-News describes the record as "dipp[ing] its finger in glam rock and a little pop-punk, all led by Eilee's sugar-and-snarl vocals." while likening her voice to "Debbie Harry with a smidge of Courtney Love." CoolDad Music writes "from the first spaced-out sounds of "Planets" the edges of my mouth start to curl upwards. "What was I even worrying about again?" I think to myself as Eilee and Joe Centeno sing about narrowing the hundred-million mile distance between two people down to an actual planetary collision."

== Track listing ==
No.	Title	Writer(s)	Length
1.	"Planets"		4:24
2.	"Gold Glitter Shoes"		3:45
3.	"Living the Lost Boy Life"		3:58
4.	"I Want Something More"		2:25
5.	"Stay Up All Night"		4:24
6.	"Miracles"		4:08
7.	"We Got the Beat"	The Go-Go's	2:32
Total length:			27:15

== Personnel ==
- Eilee Centeno – vocals
- Evren Centeno – drums
- Gloree Centeno – bass
- Joe Centeno – guitars and backing vocals
