= Make It Happen =

Make It Happen may refer to:

== Stage, Film and television ==
- Make It Happen (film), a 2008 American dance film
- "Make It Happen" (Wizards of Waverly Place), a 2009 television episode
- Make It Happen (play), a 2025 play by James Graham

== Music ==
=== Albums ===
- Make It Happen (Nizlopi album), 2008
- Make It Happen (Smokey Robinson and the Miracles album), 1967
- Make It Happen (EP), by Rock N Roll Hi Fives, 2014
- Make It Happen, an EP by the Tough Alliance, 2004

=== Songs ===
- "Make It Happen" (Mariah Carey song), 1991
- "Make It Happen" (Electronic song), 1999
- "Make It Happen", by Blue from All Rise, 2001
- "Make It Happen", by The Teenagers from Reality Check, 2008
- "Make It Happen", by Namie Amuro from Checkmate!, 2011
- "Make It Happen", by Rüfüs Du Sol from Surrender, 2021
