= Vidaurri =

Vidaurri is a surname. Notable people with the surname include:

- Guillermo Cosío Vidaurri (1929–2019), Mexican diplomat
- Rita Vidaurri (1924–2019), Tejana singer
- Santiago Vidaurri (1809–1867), Mexican politician
- Shane-Michael Vidaurri, American graphic artist
