= Glenn Morrow's Cry for Help =

American rock band

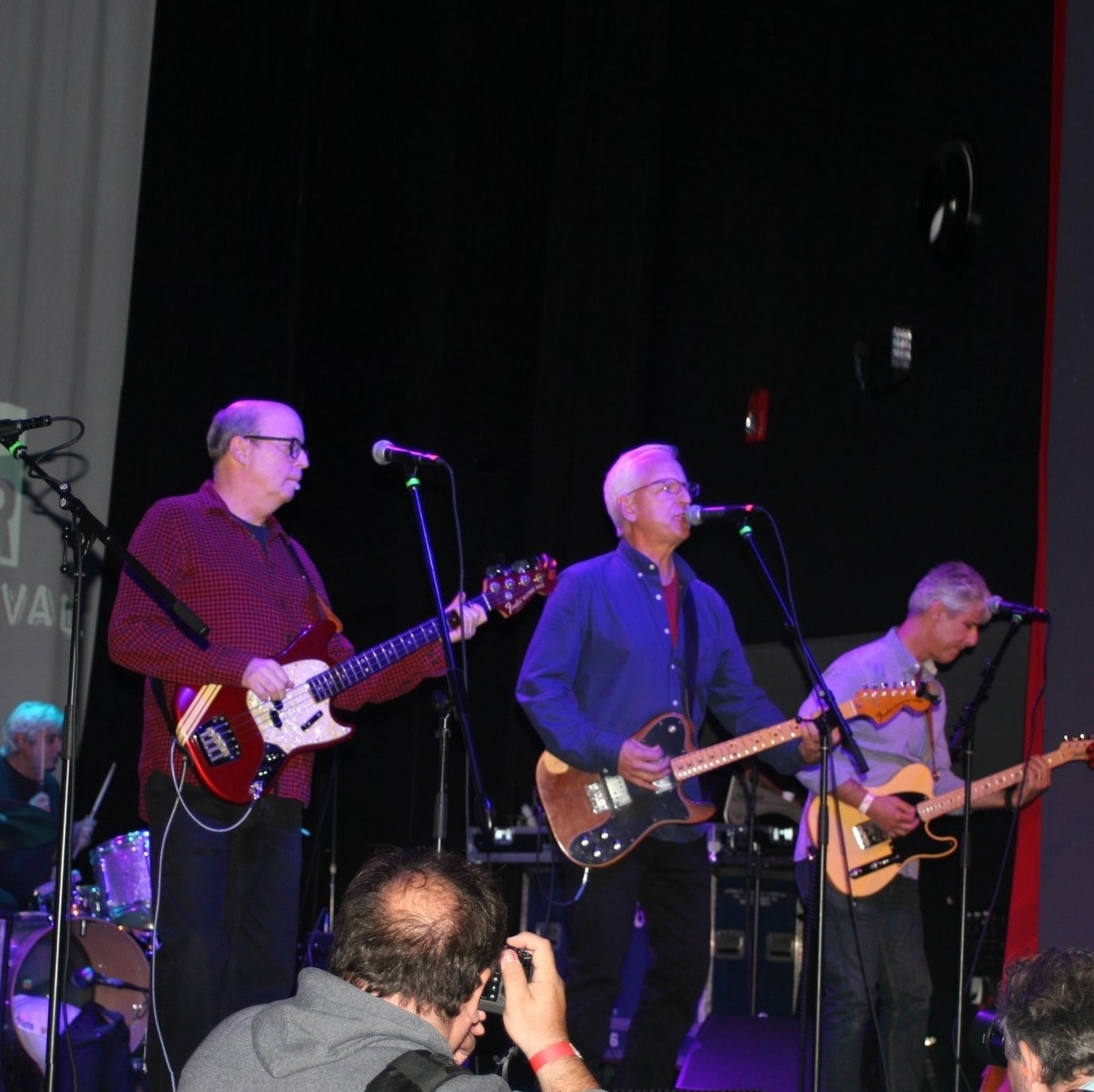
- Glenn Morrow's Cry for Help at the 2018 North Jersey Indie Rock Festival

Background information
- Origin: Hoboken, New Jersey, U.S.
- Genres: Rock
- Years active: 2015–present
- Labels: Rhyme & Reason Records
- Members: Ron Metz; Glenn Morrow; Mike Rosenberg; Ric Sherman

== History ==
Glenn Morrow's Cry for Help is an indie rock quartet from Hoboken, New Jersey, that formed in 2015. The band is composed of drummer Ron Metz, vocalist and guitarist Glenn Morrow, bassist Mike Rosenberg, and guitarist Rick Sherman. Glenn Morrow was the vocalist and guitarist for the 1970s rock band the Individuals, and the owner of Bar/None Records, and the other members are veterans of the Hoboken music scene. Their first show was at the Hoboken Arts & Music Festival, on September 27, 2015. The band cites musical influence from the blues, 1990s rock and roll, and classic rock. Glenn Morrow's Cry for Help was released on vinyl, compact disc and digital download, on June 23, 2017, with Rhyme & Reason Records. They performed at the North Jersey Indie Rock Festival on October 6, 2018.

== Personnel ==
- Ron Metz – drums
- Glenn Morrow – vocals and guitar
- Mike Rosenberg – bass and backup vocals
- Ric Sherman – guitar and backup vocals

== Discography ==
Albums

- Glenn Morrow's Cry for Help (2017)
