= Continuum (The Components album) =

Studio album by The Components
- Released: January 19, 2018
- Genre: Rock
- Length: 28:15
- Label: Mint 400 Records

The Components chronology
Chasing Colors (2015)	Continuum (2018)

Continuum is the debut studio album from the American rock band the Components.

== Content ==
The eight-track album was released on digital download with Mint 400 Records, on January 19, 2018. Continuum is conceptually about overcoming the demons of depression and substance abuse, and is described as "dark, haunting, and ambitious." The album draws comparison to the music of the post-grunge band Foo Fighters, and the alternative rock duo Royal Blood. The opening track "Parliaments and Witchcraft" appears on the 2018 compilation album NJ / NY Mixtape.

== Reception ==
Joe Wawryzniak form Jersey Beat describes Continuum as "robust shouted vocals, incendiary guitar riffs, fat throbbing basslines, and fierce pile driving drums" and a "totally kick-ass blast of pure sweaty'n'sinewy noise and fury." It made music journalist Jim Testa's Top 10 Hudson County Records of 2018, who notes "you'll definitely hear elements of the White Stripes in the band's stripped-down approach, but there's also, excuse the expression, a continuum of influences from classic blues to frantic punk to sludgy metal." Tim Louie of The Aquarian Weekly says "this duo packs quite a punch on songs like "Parliaments and Witchcraft," "Filthy," "Ill Bandito" and "Glass Haüs." The Spill Magazine calls "Glass Haüs" one of the best tracks on the record, with "its beyond catchy riff and transition from the songs upbeat pace to a sludgy halftime section in the middle," and notes their attention to "melody not only adds another dimension to the record, but it creates a much richer listening experience, further adding to the bands unique style that is largely driven by punk stylings, but features a number of rock based elements."

== Track listing ==
No.	Title	Length
1.	"Parliaments and Witchcraft"	3:32
2.	"Mayday"	3:15
3.	"Filthy"	4:55
4.	"Spirit's Help"	3:01
5.	"Interlude"	2:28
6.	"Complacent / Complaisant"	3:25
7.	"Ill Bandito"	3:11
8.	"Glass Haüs"	4:28
Total length:		28:15

== Personnel ==
- Ronnie Sena – vocals and guitar
- Zoe Ekonomidis – drums and backing vocals
