= Adam and the Plants =

American rock band

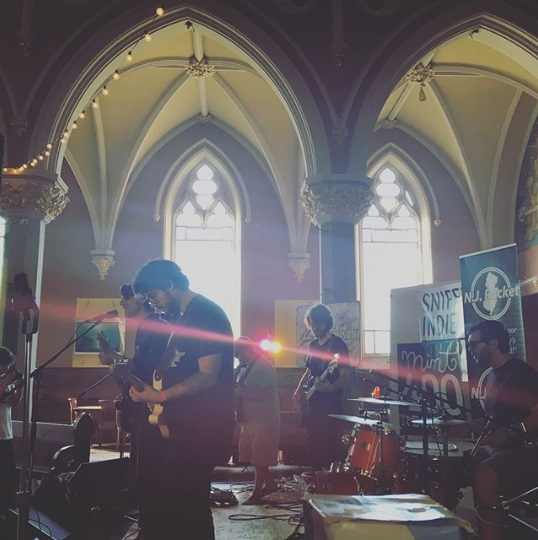
- Adam and the Plants at the 2017 North Jersey Indie Rock Festival

Background information
- Origin: Montclair, New Jersey, U.S.
- Genres: indie rock, power pop
- Years active: 2012–present
- Label: Sniffling Indie Kids
- Website: adamandtheplants.com

Adam and the Plants were an American indie rock band from New Jersey.

== History ==
Adam and the Plants were a indie rock and power pop group from Montclair, New Jersey, that was formed in 2012, by singer and guitarist Adam Copeland, previously in the bands Ben Franklin, the Meltdowns and Black Water; the latter described as "irascible but big-hearted punk rock." Copeland cites musical influence from Alex Chilton, 1970s Brian Eno, Kinoko Teikoku and Spencer Krug. Copeland now produces music as Wire Crimes.

Their first album, The End of the World was self-released on compact disc and digital download, on May 1, 2015.

=== Sniffling Indie Kids ===
The four-track EP Born with the Gift of Magic was released with Sniffling Indie Kids on compact disc and digital download, on January 27, 2017. It was recorded in late 2015, produced by Copeland at Pearl Studios, mixed by Skylar Adler at Skylar Ross Recording, and mastered by Alan Douches at West West Side Music.

The record release show for Born with the Gift of Magic was held at Porta in Jersey City, New Jersey, on January 30, 2017, with Delicate Flowers and Desir Decir. Adam and the Plants performed at the North Jersey Indie Rock Festival, on September 23, 2017.

== Discography ==
Albums

- The End of the World (2015)

EPs

- Born with the Gift of Magic (2017)
- Ghost (2019)
