= North Jersey Indie Rock Festival =

Indie Rock Festival (2016–2018)

- Poster for the 2016 North Jersey Indie Rock Festival.
- Genre: Indie rock
- Locations: Jersey City, New Jersey, U.S.
- Years active: 2016–2018
- Founders: Frank DeFranco, Neil Sabatino

The North Jersey Indie Rock Festival was an American annual concert in Jersey City, that showcased artists primarily from New Jersey. The festival ran from 2016 to 2018.

== About ==
The festival was created by Sniffling Indie Kids co-founder Frank DeFranco and Mint 400 Records founder Neil Sabatino, in 2016. It has been hosted by many of the state's music magazines, websites and radio, including The Aquarian Weekly, Jersey Beat, Speak Into My Good Eye, and WFDU. The labels were both working on the album Creases when they were formerly introduced. Sabatino recalls in an interview with Bob Makin of Courier News, that the labels "had done a ton of local shows together and [we] saw the opportunity to do a showcase on a much larger scale[;] in the past, Mint 400 tried to do a showcase at least once a year of our local acts always at Maxwell's under the old owners," and DeFranco noted the desire to create a "festival like this because [he felt] the North Jersey scene had been overlooked by similar festivals in Asbury Park and New Brunswick."

== 2016 ==
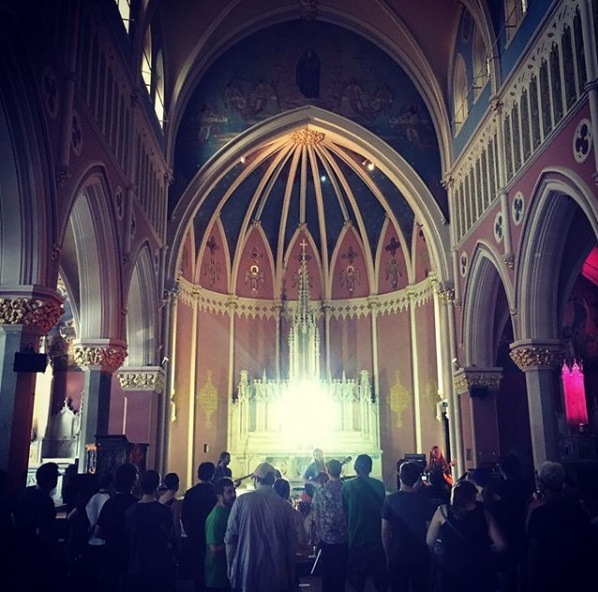
Young Legs performing at Cathedral Hall in 2016.

The first festival took place at Cathedral Hall, formerly St. Bridget's Church, a converted ornate Roman Catholic monastery, on September 10, 2016. The performances alternated between two stages, one upstairs on the deconsecrated altar and the other downstairs in the church's former recreation hall. It was hosted by 4th Street Arts, Rock-It Docket, BGT Enterprises, Artist & Makers Market, BlowUpRadio, Jersey Beat, Speak Into My Good Eye, The Aquarian Weekly, The Alternative, Jersey Indie, You Don't Know Jersey, and Courier News. The festival began at 12:00 and ended at 8:00 P.M., and featured crafts, food, beer and spirits. The festival showcased twenty bands from the Mint 400 Records and Sniffling Indie Kids rosters with twenty-minute sets alternating one after the other, from the upstairs church to the downstairs community center. The artists that performed were Ancient Babies, the Bitter Chills, the Clydes, C.R. and the Degenerates, dollys, Ken De Poto, Fairmont, LKFFCT, the Maravines, NGHTCRWLRS, Pixl-Visionary, Quality Living, Rocky & the Chapter, Sink Tapes, Toy Cars, Tri-State, Underlined Passages, Shane Vidaurri, YJY, and Young Legs.

Approximately five-hundred people attended the concert.

== 2017 ==
The second annual festival occurred at Cathedral Hall on September 23, 2017. It began at 12:00 and ended at 8:00 P.M., and showcased twenty-four bands. In addition to Mint 400 Records and Sniffling Indie Kids artists, the 2017 festival featured artists from Bar/None Records, Killing Horse Records and Little Dickman Records. The event was co-hosted by Jonathan LeVine Projects, along with 4th Street Arts, BGT Enterprises, Rock-It Docket, Jersey Indie, BlowUpRadio, You Don't Know Jersey, The Alternative, CoolDad Music, Courier News, Jersey Beat, New Jersey Stage, Speak Into My Good Eye, and WFDU. Artists that performed were aBIRD, Adam and the Plants, the Brixton Riot, Cicada Radio, Cyclone Static, Delicate Flowers, Dentist, Désir Decir, the Duke of Norfolk, Fruit & Flowers, Kult of Mary, LKFFCT, the Moms, Psychiatric Metaphors, Quality Living, Rock N Roll Hi Fives, Rocky & the Chapter, Shred Flintstone, the Skullers, Spicy Girls, Spowder, Tom Barrett of Overlake, and TV Sound.

== 2018 ==
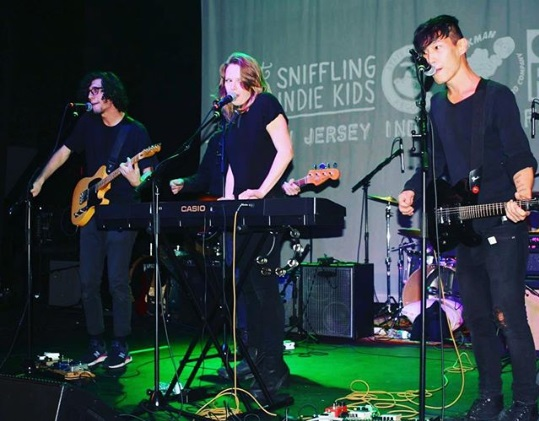
Shithead's Rainbow at White Eagle Hall.

The third annual North Jersey Indie Rock Festival occurred at White Eagle Hall in Jersey City on October 6, 2018. It began at 4:00 and ended at 11:00 P.M., and was hosted by Rock-It Docket, Jersey Indie, BlowUpRadio, DIY Radio, You Don't Know Jersey, The Pop Break, comeherefloyd, The Alternative, CoolDad Music, Makin Waves, Look at my Records!, Jersey Beat, New Jersey Stage, Speak Into My Good Eye, and WFDU. The festival featured eighteen bands from five independent New Jersey record labels; Little Dickman Records, Mint 400 Records, Rhyme & Reason Records, Sniffling Indie Kids and State Champion Records. The artists that performed were Black Wail, the Components, Dentist, Exmaid, Glazer, Glenn Morrow's Cry for Help, Guilty Giraffe, LKFFCT, Professor Caveman, the Royal Arctic Institute, Tony Saxon, Secretary Legs, Shithead's Rainbow, Smock, Ultra Major, the Vaughns, and Yawn Mower. The festival continued with an after party at FM Bar with music by the Vice Rags.

Mint 400 Records released a promotional compilation on September 14, 2018, dedicated to the bands who played the 2018 North Jersey Indie Rock Festival, entitled NJ / NY Mixtape. The eighteen-track album features unreleased tracks by Cyclone Static, Guilty Giraffe and Tony Saxon.

== End ==
On July 17, 2019, Mint 400 Records executive Neil Sabatino confirmed that there would not be a 2019 event, as it had outgrown its original effort to "focus on the smaller bands we are developing", and the festival would not continuing on.

== See also ==
- Court Tavern
- The Orange Loop
- Asbury Lanes
