= The Components =

American alternative rock duo

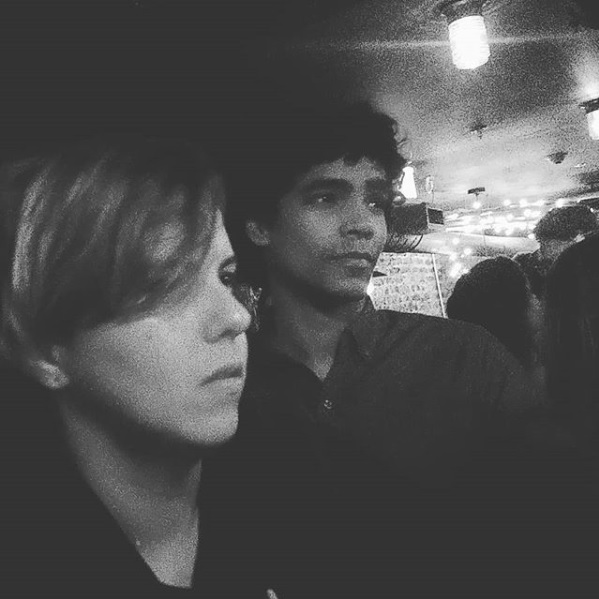
- Ekonomidis and Sena in 2018

Background information
- Origin: Jersey City, New Jersey, U.S.
- Genres: Indie, rock
- Years active: 2015–present
- Labels: Mint 400
- Members: Zoe Ekonomidis; Ronnie Sena

The Components are an American alternative rock band from New Jersey.

== History ==
The Components are an alternative and grunge rock band from Jersey City, New Jersey. Guitarist and vocalist Ronnie Sena and drummer Zoe Ekonomidis were previously in a band, called Asphalt Grey. During that period, Sena recorded songs independently, releasing a five-track EP entitled Chasing Colors under a ""fake" band called the Components." After Asphalt Grey broke up in late 2016, Sena and Ekonomidis continued playing, and in an interview with The Jersey Journal, Sena recalls "Zoe and I had this amazing chemistry from the first time we played together so we knew we wanted to keep going."

The two rejoined as the Components, in January 2017. Sena claims classic blues as their biggest inspiration, along with the Arctic Monkeys, Built to Spill and the White Stripes. In 2017 The Components won the Jersey City Battle of the Bands, which landed them a deal with independent record label Mint 400 Records, and high-profile gigs.

=== Mint 400 Records ===
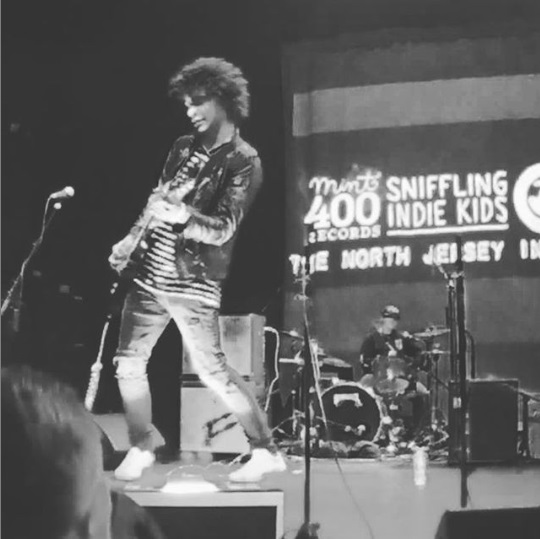
The Components at the 2018 North Jersey Indie Rock Festival

Their debut full-length, Continuum, was released on Mint 400 Records on January 19, 2018. Joe Wawryzniak form Jersey Beat describes Continuum as "robust shouted vocals, incendiary guitar riffs, fat throbbing basslines, and fierce pile driving drums," and a "totally kick-ass blast of pure sweaty'n'sinewy noise and fury." Music journalist Jim Testa named Continuum No. 10 on his list of the Top 10 Hudson County Records of 2018. A review by The Spill Magazine compares the album to the music of the Foo Fighters, and Royal Blood, and notes "their attention to melody not only adds another dimension to the record, but it creates a much richer listening experience, further adding to the bands unique style that is largely driven by punk stylings, but features a number of rock based elements." On October 6, 2018, the Components performed at the North Jersey Indie Rock Festival.

== Members ==
- Zoe Ekonomidis – drums and vocals
- Ronnie Sena – vocals and guitar

== Discography ==
Albums

- Continuum (2018)

EPs

- Chasing Colors (2015)

Appearing on

- NJ / NY Mixtape (2018)
