= The Vice Rags =

American rock band from New Jersey

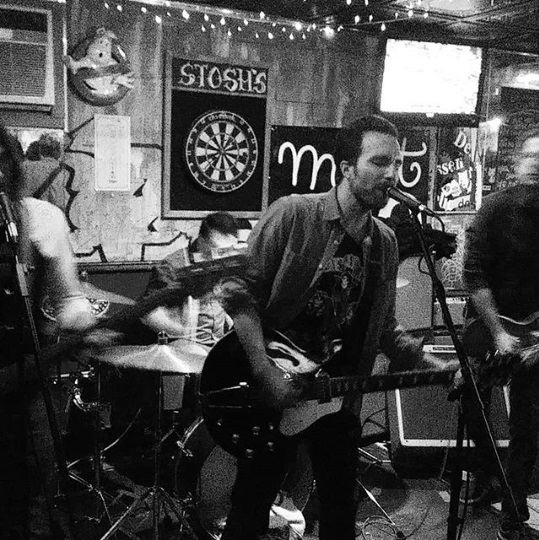
- The Vice Rags at Stosh's in 2018.

Background information
- Origin: Jersey City and Asbury Park, New Jersey, U.S.
- Genres: Alternative rock, garage rock
- Years active: 2017–present
- Labels: Mint 400 Records
- Members: Joe Chyb; Gay Elvis; Jack Roberts; Paul Rosevear

The Vice Rags are an American rock band from New Jersey.

== History ==
The Vice Rags were formed in 2017 by born-and-raised New Jersey musicians, Paul Rosevear and Joe Chyb, from North Brunswick, New Jersey, and Jack Roberts and Gay Elvis from Hillsborough, New Jersey. They met while performing in prior bands in the New Jersey independent rock scene, and together they play a blend of "tribute to the '50s and '60s sounds that influenced the '70s and '80s," and are classified as bluesy, garage rock and fuzz rock.

They released a self-titled EP in November 2017, which was produced by Paul Ritchie and recorded at Insidious Sound Studio in Neptune. Music Editor Jim Testa of Jersey Beat called The Vice Rags his favorite EP of 2017.

=== Mint 400 Records ===
In 2018, the Vice Rags signed with independent label Mint 400 Records. They released the seven-track EP Hope the Neighbors are Lookin' on 27 July 2018. The EP is a re-release of their self-titled EP, with a rendition of Little Richard's "Lucille" as a bonus track. In a 2018 interview with The Spill Magazine, Rosevear explains their cover was "one of the first songs we jammed on at our first ever practice; we were so happy with how we changed the cover that we kept it that way and put it on the album." The album was listed in New Jersey Stage's Best NJ Indie Records of 2018, and Joe Chyb received the Asbury Park Music Awards' Top Drummer award.

== Members ==
- Joe Chyb – drums
- Gay Elvis – bass and vocals
- Jack Roberts – lead guitar
- Paul Rosevear – vocals and guitar

== Discography ==
EPs

- The Vice Rags (2017)
- Hope the Neighbors are Lookin' (2018)
- Midnight Ride (2022)

Appears on

- NJ / NY Mixtape (2018)

== Bibliography ==
- Asbury Park Music Awards Staff (2018), "25th Annual Asbury Music Awards 2017-2018" (PDF), Asbury Park Music Awards
- Harris, Gerrod (May 3, 2018), "Petty, The Blues, and The Vice Rags: A conversation with Paul Rosevear of The Vice Rags", The Spill Magazine
- Makin, Bob (January 4, 2018a), "Makin Waves' Record of the Week: "The Vice Rags"", The Aquarian Weekly
- Makin, Bob (November 21, 2018b), "Makin Waves Best Indie Records 2018", New Jersey Stage
- Shephard, Phil (December 20, 2017), "SIMGE On The Scene: Jo Smith, The Vice Rags, Adam Bird and Yawn Mower played Happy Mondays", Speak Into My Good Eye
- Sissini, Olivia (December 18, 2017), "Garage Rockers: The Vice Rags drop self-titled EP", The Deli
- Testa, Jim (2018), "The Vice Rags - "The Vice Rags" EP", Jersey Beat, archived from the original on December 6, 2018
- Testa, Jim (2018), "Jersey Beat's Top Albums", Jersey Beat
