= Sink Tapes =

American indie rock band

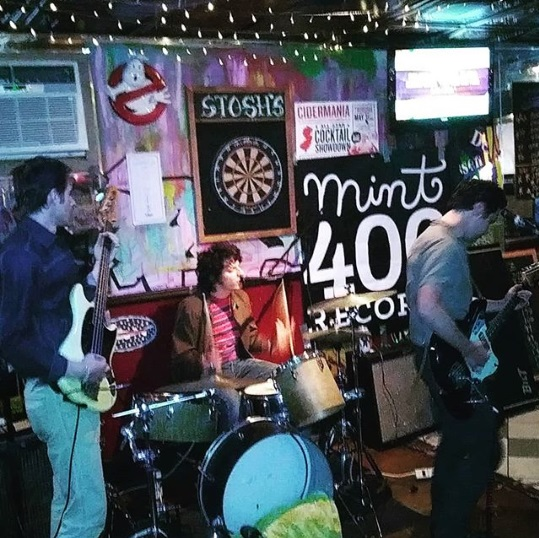
- Sink Tapes at Stoshs, June 22, 2018.

Background information
- Origin: New Brunswick, New Jersey, U.S.
- Genres: Indie, pop rock
- Years active: 2010–present
- Labels: Don't Live Like Me, Mint 400, Fourth Row, Sniffling Indie Kids
- Members: Gabe Chiarello; Alex Kielmanski; Ricky Kuczynski

Sink Tapes are an American indie rock band from New Jersey.

== History ==
Sink Tapes are a three-piece indie rock band from New Brunswick, New Jersey, that formed in 2010. Same Strange Dream was released in 2010 on DVD. Their second album, Please Touch, released on November 22, 2012, and is noted for its "fuzzy '90s tact [and] the freer tendencies rock's helped foster since '60s experimentalism." The EP Mattress Cowboys was released in 2013.

=== Mint 400 Records ===
Sink Tapes signed with Mint 400 Records in 2013, and released the single "Super Happy" and the album How You Mean. In 2014, Mint 400 Records reissued Please Touch and Mattress Cowboys. Sink Tapes signed with Sniffling Indie Kids in 2015. The twenty-five track album, Creases, was released that year. Physical copies of Creases were made available by Sniffling Indie Kids, who has subsequently released several albums by Sink Tapes. They released the single "You Shouldn't Have" on July 17, 2015, and on August 27 they released Window Unit Blues, a twelve-track album. A live acoustic rendition of the song "You Shouldn't Have" appears on the compilation, In a Mellow Tone. The six-track ST EP 16 was released on March 8, 2016.

Sink Tapes performed at the 2016 North Jersey Indie Rock Festival. The experimental sixteen-track Secret Club, recorded on a four-track cassette, was released on February 20, 2018. Their song "Cassini" appears on the Mint 400 Records compilation album, NJ / NY Mixtape.

== Members ==
- Gabe Chiarello – vocals and drums
- Alex Kielmanski – guitar
- Ricky Kuczynski – guitar and vocals

Past members

- Thomas Dalzell – bass (2010–2015)
- Matt Lambert – bass (2016–2017)

== Discography ==
Albums

- Same Strange Dream (2010)
- Please Touch (2012)
- How You Mean (2013)
- Touchdown Buffalo (2014)
- Creases (2015)
- In the Rug (2015)
- Window Unit Blues (2015)
- ST EP 16 (2016)
- Secret Club (2018)
- Playground of Verses (2018)
- Enough to Flood the Cow (2019)

EPs

- Mattress Cowboys (2013)

Singles

- "Super Happy" (2013)
- "Nightmail" (2013)
- "You Sulk When You Sleep" (2014)
- "Plastic Lover" (2015)
- "You Shouldn't Have" (2015)
- "Priority Mail" (2015)
- "Wizard Shit" (2018)
- "Cut Flowers" (2019)
- "Drac/Witch" (2019)
- "Curtains" (2020)
- "Kisses For Richard" (2020)

Appearing on

- Patchwork (2014)
- Transformed: A Tribute to Lou Reed (2014)
- In a Mellow Tone (2015)
- NJ / NY Mixtape (2018)
