= Palace Amusements (album) =

Studio album by The Brixton Riot
- Released: 13 March 2012
- Studio: Arcade Audio
- Genre: Alternative rock, indie rock
- Length: 37:48
- Label: Modern Hymnal
- Producer: Dave Harman

The Brixton Riot chronology
Sudden Fiction (2008)	Palace Amusements (2012)	Close Counts (2017)

Palace Amusements is the first studio album from the American rock band the Brixton Riot.

== Content ==
The debut twelve-track album was released on compact disc by Modern Hymnal, and digitally self-released on 13 March 2012. It was recorded by Dave Harman at Arcade Audio in Union, New Jersey, with additional recording at Silver Beat in Howell, New Jersey. Palace Amusements is described as indie pop and power pop, featuring retro guitar tones, and it draws comparison to the music of the Lemonheads, and the Clash.

The opening track "Signal to Noise" inspired the name of the college radio station WFDU's popular indie-rock radio show hosted by Al Crisafulli, which shares the name.

== Reception ==
A review in Magnet says "you can never be reminded too many times of why guitar dominates the rock 'n' roll genre, and "Canvas Shoes" does just that. The Brixton Riot puts forth a solid offering of what has made rock great for generations: guitarists doing their thing and doing it well." Mike Levine in The Deli calls the Brixton Riot "the kind of good natured power pop that could only come out of my home state of New Jersey," adding from ""Hipster Turns 30" to "Strange Matter," singer Jerry Lardieri echoes his awkward journey into adulthood for all to hear."

The strongest track on the album according to The Aquarian Weekly's Roz Smith is "It's Been Too Long," saying that "the piece fluctuates between high-energy guitar riffs, passion fueled vocals and an '80s ballad, containing outlandish drumming." The review closes with "in its entirety, Palace Amusements just flows from one solid song to the next without disappointing the listener. There really is a little bit of everything stuck into the DNA that makes up the disc." James Damion in Jersey Beat says when "I got my hands on a copy of Palace Amusements, the hooks got in and stayed in me."

== Track listing ==
No.	Title	Length
1.	"Signal to Noise"	3:20
2.	"Hard To See the Sun"	3:00
3.	"Canvas Shoes"	3:24
4.	"Our Cover's Been Blown"	3:09
5.	"Pinwheel"	3:38
6.	"Hipster Turns 30"	2:37
7.	"Carmelita"	1:40
8.	"Ocean Avenue"	2:28
9.	"Strange Matter"	3:39
10.	"Keep It like A Secret"	2:35
11.	"It's Been Too Long"	5:06
12.	"Losing Streak"	3:17
Total length:		37:48

== Personnel ==
- Steve Hass – bass and vocals
- Matt Horutz – drums
- Jerry Lardieri – vocals and guitar
- Mark Wright – guitar
