= Get to the Boat =

EP by Yawn Mower
- Released: May 5, 2016
- Studio: Insidious Sound, Neptune City, New Jersey
- Genre: Indie rock
- Length: 16:29
- Label: Self-released
- Producer: Paul Ritchie

Yawn Mower chronology
Get to the Boat (2016)	Yawn Mower Ruins Christmas (2016)

Get to the Boat is the debut studio EP from the American rock band Yawn Mower, released in May 2016.

== Content ==
The five-track EP was self-released on compact disc and digital download, on May 5, 2016. It was recorded by Paul Ritchie at Insidious Sound in Neptune City, New Jersey, and mastered by Pat Noon at Eightsixteen Studios in South River, New Jersey. The album photography is by Michael Burke and layout by Michael Loupos. Jenn Fantaccione plays cello on "Convenience Store." Get to the Boat is noted for its punk influences, and is described as "a sardonic statement on the banality of existence." In a 2017 interview with The Pop Break, Yawn Mower explains the album "was our first proper release, so I feel like we spent more time on that one. We stepped away from sessions to let the ideas simmer."

== Track listing ==
No.	Title	Length
1.	"Two Frequencies"	3:06
2.	"Ride the Subway"	3:04
3.	"Convenience Store"	5:06
4.	"The Teleprompter Rolls"	1:55
5.	"Seltzer Burps"	3:18
Total length:		16:29

== Personnel ==
- Mike Chick – vocals and baritone guitar
- Biff Swenson – drums, percussion and vocals

Additional musicians

- Jenn Fantaccione – cello on "Convenience Store"
