= 33 Thorne Street =

- Cover art for the cassette issue.

Studio album by Psychiatric Metaphors
- Released: April 3, 2015
- Genre: Psychedelic punk
- Length: 27:09
- Label: King Pizza Records
- Producer: Samuel Taylor

Psychiatric Metaphors chronology
Psychiatric Metaphors (2014)	33 Thorne Street (2015)	The Seeker (2015)

33 Thorne Street is the debut studio album from the American punk rock band Psychiatric Metaphors.

== Content ==
The eight-track album was released on cassette tape and digital download with King Pizza Records, on April 3, 2015. Songs and production are by Samuel Taylor, and it was recorded in Jersey City, New Jersey. It is a described as "crunchy retro," and the album draws comparison to the music of the Ramones, 13th Floor Elevators, Sonic Youth, and Golden Animals. 33 Thorne Street is conceptually about murder, paranoia, unrequited love and the supernatural.

A review by Speak Into My Good Eye says 33 Thorne Street has a "decidedly Lo-Fi approach [with] heavy fuzzed-out guitars and a loping beat drive most of the songs [which] slide by smoothly, leaving a pleasant afterglow of satisfaction and a desire to start over from the top to see if it was really as good as it seemed the first time around." For the title-track, The Deli columnist Dave Cromwell writes it has "clean, 60's sounding bright guitars [with] vocals [that] come off a tad "sneering" [and] an appealing amount of guitar noodling over the basic chords and simple drumming." He also says the song "She's So Fine" "goes deeper into the caverns of early garage rock, conjuring up the spirit of Moby Grape and their classic track "Omaha.""

== Track listing ==
No.	Title	Length
1.	"Stone Bros. Know"	3:19
2.	"33 Thorne Street"	3:59
3.	"Sleep Deprivation"	3:59
4.	"She's so Fine"	2:08
5.	"Mr. President"	3:59
6.	"Gravesite (Sanctuary)"	3:13
7.	"Elevator"	2:56
8.	"Green Leaf Disease"	3:36
Total length:		27:09

== Personnel ==
- Samuel Taylor – vocals and instrumentation
