= Professor Caveman =

American rock band

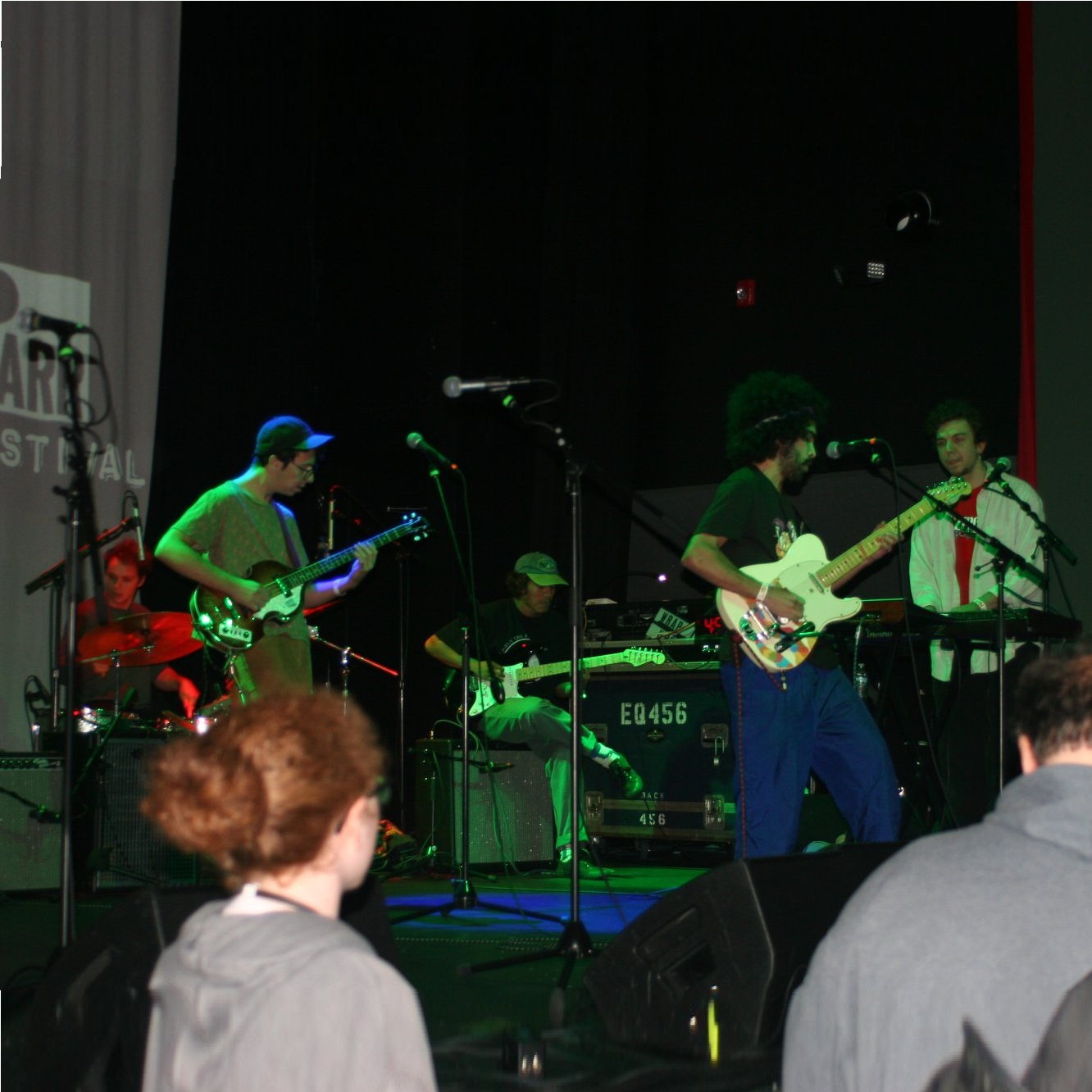
- Professor Caveman at the 2018 North Jersey Indie Rock Festival

Background information
- Origin: New Brunswick, New Jersey, U.S.
- Genres: Indie
- Years active: 2014–present
- Label: Sniffling Indie Kids
- Members: John Colaiacovo; Dan Connolly; Omar Elshafi; Shannon Moore; Rob Romano

Professor Caveman, now performing as Chico Romano, is an American rock band from New Jersey.

== History ==
Professor Caveman was founded in 2014 by Rob Romano, a printmaking major, during his freshman year at Rutgers University. Their music is classified as garage and punk, and they draw comparison to the bands Foxygen, Best Coast and the musician Mac DeMarco. Their first EP, the six-track grape., was released on February 23, 2014. It is described as psychedelic surf-rock, and draws comparison to the music of the Beach Boys.

Professor Caveman's second EP, Vol. 2, was released on December 5, 2014, and features "latin bossa nova undertones and a more prominent punk-rock influence, creating a mélange of genres that work together harmoniously." By 2014, Professor Caveman became popular in New Brunswick's basement scene, and they played at the college radio station, 90.3 The Core's 2014 musical festival Corefest.The Deli calls their third album, Vol. 3, "a super intriguing and borderline bizarre EP," adding that "the luscious, crisp guitar chords[,] melt, blend, and evolve into something else entirely; cryptic and fuzzy vocals mumble barely articulate lyrics with a South American flavor, wallowing into ever-changing bass lines and drum beats, all accompanied by a horn section."

=== Sniffling Indie Kids ===
In 2017, Professor Caveman signed with Sniffling Indie Kids, and released the four-track EP Vol. 3, on May 19, 2017. They performed at the North Jersey Indie Rock Festival on October 6, 2018. Their fourth EP, the five-song Vol. 4, was released on April 20, 2018. It is described as psychedelic funk and draws comparison to the music of Ariel Pink and Unknown Mortal Orchestra. Bob Makin of The Aquarian Weekly says that "the jams 'n' grooves are as righteous as the rain[,] with its sweet Prince-like falsetto; frantic, driving beat; tribal backing vocals; nuanced keyboard and synthesizer flourishes, and smooth, yet sexy Steely Dannish guitar runs." Adam Yawdosyn of The Rutgers Review lists the EP in his Best Songs and Albums of 2018, and calls Professor Caveman the "best band in New Brunswick."

== Members ==
- Rob Romano – guitar and vocals
- Shannon Moore – drums
- Dan Connolly – bass
- Gabe Marquez – guitar
- Jon Evers – keys

=== Past members ===
- Louis Ardine – bass
- Erica Butts – guitar
- Mike Madden – drums
- Omar Elshafi – guitar
- John Colaiacovo – keys

== Discography ==
EPs

- grape. (2014)
- Vol. 2 (2014)
- Vol. 3 (2017)
- Vol. 4 (2018)
- Vol. 5 (2022), credited as both Professor Caveman and Chico Romano
- Professor Caveman Live on WNYU (2024), live EP

Albums

- Top and Tail (2023), as Chico Romano
