= Psychiatric Metaphors (EP) =

EP by Psychiatric Metaphors
- Released: August 26, 2016
- Genre: Psychedelic punk
- Length: 22:08
- Label: Little Dickman Records
- Producer: Samuel Taylor

Psychiatric Metaphors chronology
The Seeker (2015)	Psychiatric Metaphors (2016)

Psychiatric Metaphors is the first EP from the American punk rock band Psychiatric Metaphors.

== Content ==
The six-track EP was released as a digital download, and as a four-track limited edition issue on green and black 7"-vinyl, with Little Dickman Records on 26 August 2016. The vinyl issue contains the first four tracks of the EP. Recording and production is by Samuel Taylor. The album cover art is by Ryan Koster. Taylor writes of the opening track "born of deep space, dark matter seeped from the infinite depths of the void, and summoned mystic creatures of fuzz, culminating in the heavy psychedelic experience known as "Black Mass."" The record release show for Psychiatric Metaphors was at Shea Stadium in Brooklyn, New York City, on August 25, 2016, at Shea Stadium in Brooklyn, New York City, with support from bassist and vocalist Pat Brenner, guitarist and vocalist Mike Bongi and drummer Mike Nugent. Supporting artists at the show were Super FM, Fruit & Flowers, and Ex-Girlfriends

== Reception ==
Speak Into My Good Eye editor Mike Mehalick writes "lurching forward like a mythical beast awoken from a seemingly endless slumber, the fuzzy guitars and undulating rhythms drive forward as Taylor calls out from the void," and John Pfeiffer of The Aquarian Weekly says "guitars quake and moan over the top of heavy-duty rhythms and echo-laden vocal invasions." Pfeiffer describes the opening track "Black Mass" as "combining the dark and dirty imagery of Black Sabbath[;] deep, demented guitar riffs are the force of the day as Sam Taylor blows his echoed vocals out over the top of this sinister-sounding number."

"The Parasite" takes "the dark sound effects and rolls them into a surf sounding pop/punk serenade" and has a "heavy metal sound that would surely be found in one's nightmares," as described by Impose. CoolDad Music notes the song's "convulsive repetition merges with some spaced-out embellishments creating the sense that it's hurtling through a pocket of space-time created fresh out of Taylor's head."

== Track listing ==
No.	Title	Length
1.	"Black Mass"	4:34
2.	"Strange Meat"	2:22
3.	"The Parasite"	2:46
4.	"Say Her Name"	2:59
5.	"Stoned and Alone"	4:22
6.	"Apeirophobia"	5:05
Total length:		22:08

== Personnel ==
- Samuel Taylor – vocals and instrumentation
