= Iron: or, the War After =

2013 graphic novel by Shane-Michael Vidaurri

- Creator: Shane-Michael Vidaurri
- Date: 2013
- Page count: 152 pages
- Publisher: Archaia Entertainment

Iron, or, the War After is a graphic novel by the American artist Shane-Michael Vidaurri.

== About ==
Iron, or, the War After is an original graphic novel painted in watercolor, by Shane-Michael Vidaurri, and published by Archaia Entertainment in 2013. The hardcover novel is one-hundred and fifty-two pages long, with a deep red fabric cover and gold lettering on the front and spine, and it sold for $24.95. It is delicately illustrated with darkly painted blues, whites, grays and blacks. Vidaurri worked on the concept for a couple years before it came together as a story, drawing precursory characters and writing a mini-comic. He describes the work as The Wind in the Willows meets All Quiet on the Western Front, and in an interview with MTV, he notes that he drew inspiration from Greek tragedies, like Antigone, and the Cold War-era spy classic Tinker Tailor Soldier Spy. NPR compares the work to Art Spiegelman's Maus, and George Orwell's Animal Farm.

=== Plot summary ===
Set after a conflict between predator and prey animals, Iron, or, the War After follows a rabbit named Hardin, who has stolen bits of secret intelligence from a military base, and his children meet other animals as they attempt to bring down the ruling Regime. The novel contains themes of patriotism, treachery, loyalty, sacrifice and courage.

== Reception ==
Comic Book Resources says Vidaurri's "art is minimalistic and beautiful - the book is painted, and as it takes place in the winter, Vidaurri gives us a lot of sparse nature scenes, as the characters move through a snowy and vacant landscape." A review by Bill Baker in The Morton Report says "Iron: or, the War After is "filled with believable and realistic characterizations, moments of quiet introspection and startling clarity, shot through with a sense of foreboding and tension broken only occasionally by the odd moment of primal brutality, this beautifully rendered graphic novel offers a reading experience unlike just about everything else out there at present," and closes with "in other words, it's a great deal of fun, and one hell of a debut." The Toronto Star says the book is "a treasure to behold [and] every page seems like a piece of art in itself." A reviewer from Geekadelphia writes "it's colored in a way that really complements the story [and] the production value really shines through on this one."
