= Rocky & the Chapter =

American rock band

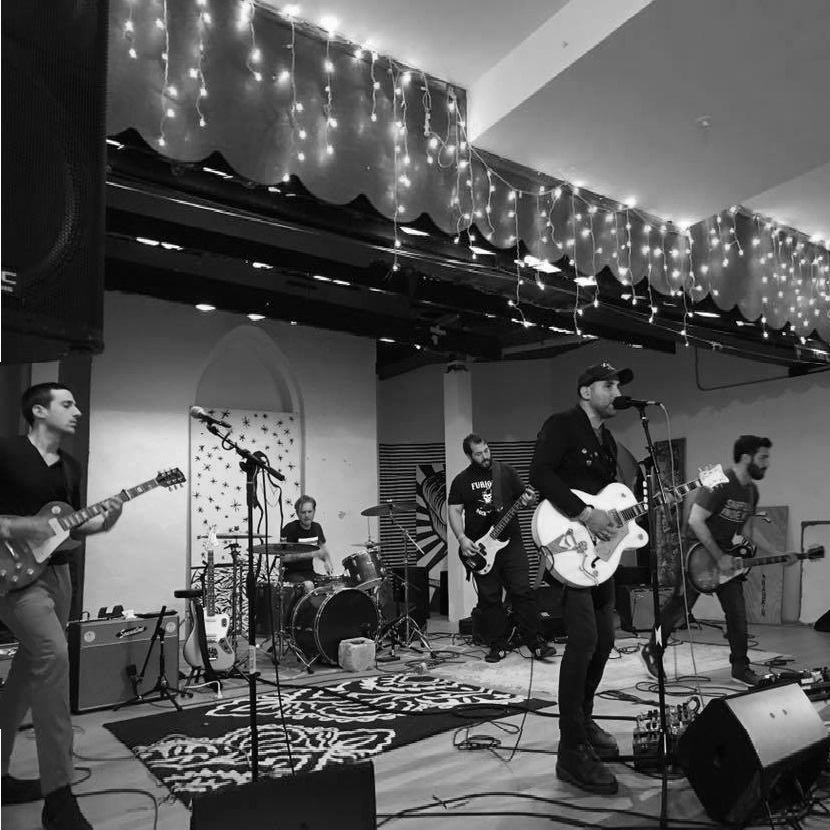
- Rocky & the Chapter at the 2017 North Jersey Indie Rock Festival

Background information
- Origin: New Brunswick, New Jersey, U.S.
- Genres: Alternative rock
- Years active: 2014–current
- Labels: Sniffling Indie Kids, Sixth Ward Sound
- Members: Matt Balog; Rocky Catanese; Chris Grzan; Joe Lanza; Trevor Reddell

Rocky & the Chapter are an American rock band from New Jersey.

== History ==
Vocalist and guitarist Rocky Catanese grew up in New Brunswick, New Jersey, and played in the band Let Me Run. After Let Me Run disbanded in 2013, Catanese began working on songs for a solo project, however he soon was collaborating with former bandmate and drummer Trevor Reddell. Shortly after, bassist Matt Balog, and guitarists Chris Grzan and Joe Lanza joined the band, which was named Rocky & the Chapter. The band cites musical influence from Ryan Adams, Counting Crows, Jawbox, Nirvana, Pearl Jam, and Tegan and Sara, and they draw comparison to the music of Motion City Soundtrack, Jimmy Eat World, and the Gaslight Anthem. On their live performances, Jim Testa calls Rocky & the Chapter "a muscular example of Hub City rock," and Speak Into My Good Eye editor Phil Shepard says "I get the hype[,] these guys bring it with great energy and feeling."

=== Sniffling Indie Kids ===
Rocky & the Chapter's first release is the single "Sun Goes Down," on January 13, 2015. Their debut six-track album New Day / Old Night was released with Sniffling Indie Kids, on August 7, 2015, and in an interview with The Pop Break, Cantonese explains the songs "are all rooted in some emotional times I've had over the last few years with friends and loved ones." He opened as a solo performer for the Gaslight Anthem lead singer and guitarist Brian Fallon, in December 2015. They released the singles "Where You Are" and "Bitter," on July 1, 2016. Rocky & the Chapter performed at the 2016 North Jersey Indie Rock Festival. The four-track EP, entitled Aye, was released on October 28, 2016. The four-track EP You Are Not Mine is described as jangly indie rock, and was released on January 24, 2017. A review by James Damion in Jersey Beat says the EP "offers a crisp Pop sound with enough kicked up guitar riffs to give it an undeniable rock edge," adding that "Rocky's voice has a special pull that draws that the listener close enough to the song to make them feel as if they're a part of it." The single "Overthinking" was released on June 9, 2017. They also performed at the North Jersey Indie Rock Festival on September 23, 2017. Rocky & the Chapter released the four-track EP They're Not Supposed to Care About Us, on September 29, 2017.

In 2018, Catanese joined the group Mercy Union, as a guitarist and vocalist, along with guitarist and vocalist Jared Hart, drummer Benny Horowitz and bassist and vocalist Nick Jorgensen.

== Members ==
- Matt Balog – bass
- Rocky Catanese – vocals and guitar
- Chris Grzan – guitar
- Joe Lanza – guitar
- Trevor Reddell – drums and percussion

== Discography ==
Albums

- New Day / Old Night (2015)

EPs

- Aye (2016)
- You Are Not Mine (2017)
- They're Not Supposed to Care About Us (2017)

Singles

- "Sun Goes Down" (2015)
- "Where You Are / Bitter" (2015)
- "Overthinking" (2017)
