= ABIRD =

American electronic rock band

aBIRD
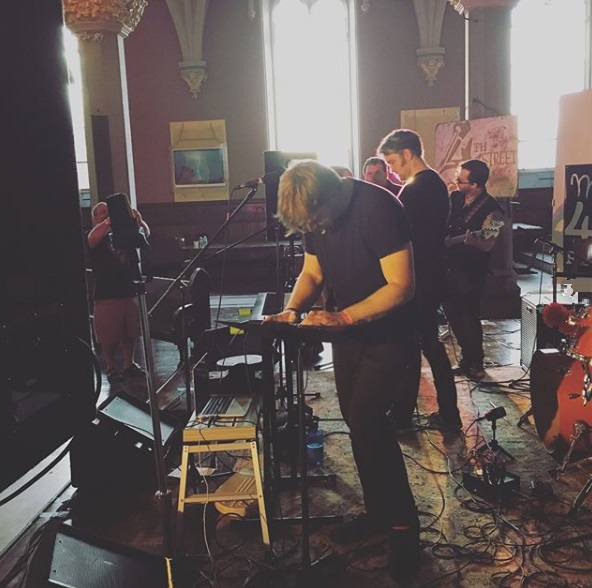
- Adam Bird at the 2017 North Jersey Indie Rock Festival.

Background information
- Origin: Montclair, New Jersey, U.S.
- Genres: Electronic rock
- Years active: 2017–present
- Label: Mint 400 Records
- Members: Adam Bird; Nick Ivory
- Website: www.abirdmusic.com

aBIRD is an American electronic rock band from New Jersey.

== History ==
Adam Bird signed to Mint 400 Records in 2017, under the moniker aBIRD. Previously, Bird was the singer of the grunge group Those Mockingbirds, who disbanded in 2017. In an interview with James Damion in Jersey Beat, Bird notes that Those Mockingbirds "were going to run the risk of diluting what we had accomplished in our own eyes," adding that "I started to get into more electronic based music[;] bands like Massive Attack, Air and LCD Soundsystem were all pivotal in opening my eyes." Their first release was a rendition of the song "Very Ape," for the tribute album Mint 400 Records Presents Nirvana In Utero. He performed at the North Jersey Indie Rock Festival on 23 September 2017, and the song "A Cool Island Song" appears on the compilation, NJ / NY Mixtape. aBIRD also made a rendition of the song "Playground Love" with CK Vibes for the compilation At the Movies.

aBIRD released the debut album, Hard Times in Two Dimensions, on 30 November 2018.

== Members ==
- Adam Bird – vocals, synth and guitar
- Nick Ivory – keys and bass

== Discography ==
Albums

- Hard Times in Two Dimensions (2018)

Appearing on

- The 3rd Annual 24 Hour Songwriting Challenge (2016)
- Mint 400 Records Presents Nirvana In Utero (2017)
- The 4th Annual 24 Hour Songwriting Challenge (2017)
- At the Movies (2018)
- NJ / NY Mixtape (2018)
