= Young Legs =

American folk musician

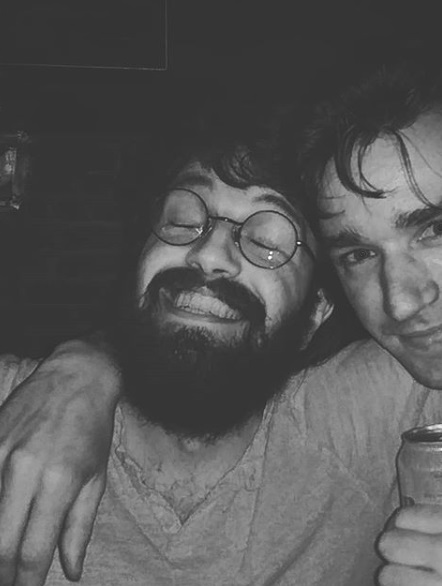

Background information
- Origin: New Jersey, U.S.
- Genres: Folk music, Indie rock
- Years active: 2010–present
- Label: Mint 400 Records
- Members: Steven Donahue
- Website: younglegs.website

Young Legs is the stage name of American folk and indie rock musician Steven Donahue, from New Jersey. He has released albums including Promise of Winter (2015) and The Petal and the Page (2016).

== Career ==
Donahue began releasing music as Young Legs in 2010, including the album The Fog and The Forest.

In 2015, Mint 400 Records released Young Legs material including the single "Resolution" and the album Promise of Winter. He performed at the 2016 North Jersey Indie Rock Festival.

In late 2016, Young Legs released the single "Ring of Salt" and the album The Petal and the Page.

== Other work ==
Young Legs appears on the Fairmont album A Spring Widow, sharing vocals with Neil Sabatino on the song "Box of Crickets". He also performed on the Defend the Rhino album Fabricated.

Donahue has played bass guitar and provided backing vocals for The Big Drops.

== Discography ==
=== Albums ===
- The Fog and The Forest (2010)
- Promise of Winter (2015)
- The Petal and the Page (2016)
- Songs From Lost Valley (2020)
- Rare Earth Dream (2024)
- Warrens & Wyrmlings (2026)

=== Singles ===
- "Resolution" (2015)
- "Ring of Salt" (2016)
