= Rock N Roll Hi Fives =

American rock band

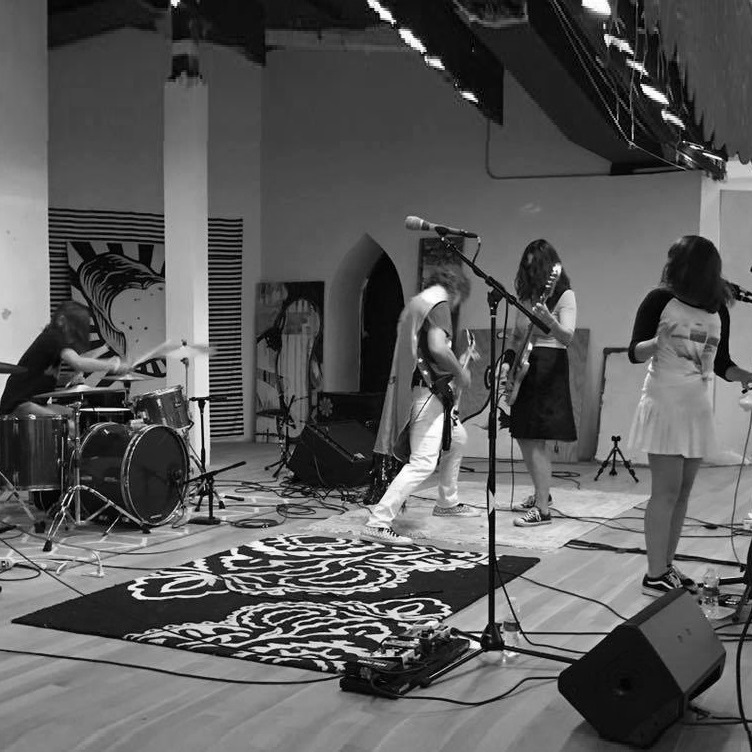
- Rock N Roll Hi Fives at the 2017 North Jersey Indie Rock Festival

Background information
- Origin: New Jersey, U.S.
- Genres: Rock and roll, indie rock
- Years active: 2013–present
- Label: Little Dickman Records
- Website: rocknrollhifives.com

Rock N Roll Hi Fives are an American rock band from New Jersey.

== History ==
Rock N Roll Hi Fives are a rock and roll four-piece from New Jersey, formed in 2013. The band is composed of vocalist Eilee Centeno, drummer Evren Centeno, bassist Gloree Centeno, and guitarist and vocalist Joe Centeno. J. Centeno performed in the late 1990s band Plug Spark Sanjay and the post-millennial band American Watercolor Movement. Eilee Centeno and G. Centeno began playing music around 2010, and Evren Centeno in 2012. The band cites musical influence from AC/DC, Nirvana, Teenage Fanclub, Pavement and early Rolling Stones, as well as '90s indie rock. Rock N Roll Hi Fives' debut EP, Make it Happen, was released on December 15, 2014. Rock N Roll Hi Fives' second EP, Gold Glitter Shoes, was released on June 16, 2015. They made their first tour of the United States in 2015. Rock N Roll Hi Fives performed at the North Jersey Indie Rock Festival on September 23, 2017.

After signing with Little Dickman Records, Rock N Roll Hi Fives released their third EP The Beat the Sound the Dragon's Roar with them, on October 21, 2017. In 2018, Rock N Roll Hi Fives went on a six-show tour of Japan, and published a tour journal in Jersey Beat. Re-introducing the RocknRoll Hi-Fives, their ten-track debut album, released on June 29, 2018.

== Members ==
- Eilee Centeno – vocals and theremin
- Evren Centeno – drums
- Gloree Centeno – bass
- Joe Centeno – guitars and backing vocals

== Discography ==
Albums

- Re-introducing the RocknRoll Hi-Fives (2018)

EPs

- Make it Happen (2014)
- Gold Glitter Shoes (2015)
- The Beat the Sound the Dragon's Roar (2016)
