= Fruit & Flowers =

American rock band

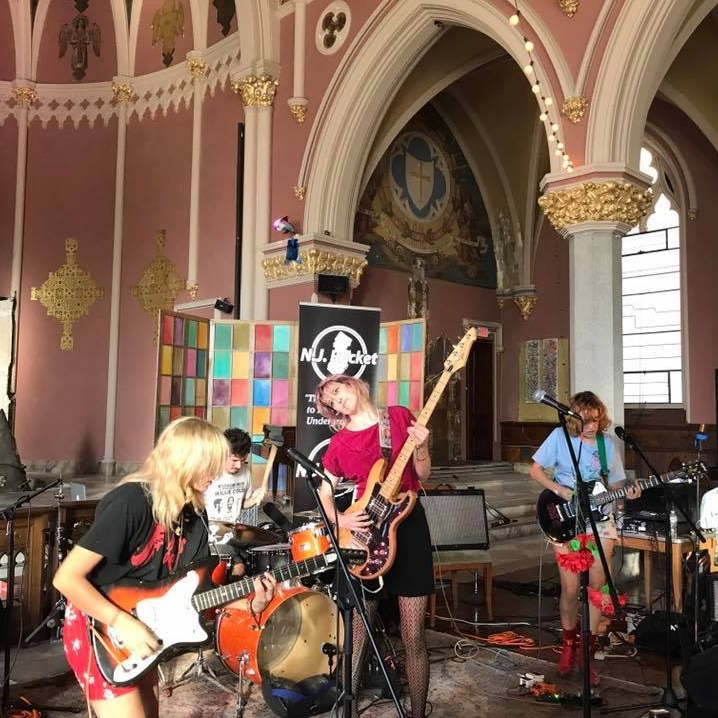
- Fruit & Flowers at the 2017 North Jersey Indie Rock Festival

Background information
- Origin: Brooklyn, New York City, U.S.
- Genres: Psychedelic punk, alternative rock, surf rock
- Years active: 2015–current
- Labels: Little Dickman Records
- Members: Ana Becker; Jose Berrio; Lyzi Wakefield; Caroline Yoder
- Website: fruitxflowers.com

Fruit & Flowers is an American rock band from New York City.

== History ==
Fruit & Flowers is a psychedelic rock quartet from Brooklyn, New York City. The band's original lineup consisted of guitarist and vocalist Ana Becker, drummer Jose Berrio, guitarist and vocalist Lyzi Wakefield, and vocalist and bassist Caroline Yoder. They were later joined by saxophonist and synthesizer-player Claire Wardlaw. The band plays gritty, dreamy surf rock and draw comparison to the Breeders, Rain Parade and 1970s punk. They played Brooklyn's Northside Festival weeks after their formation. Fruit & Flowers were introduced to Little Dickman Records by the rock band Sharkmuffin. Their first single, "Turquoise," was released on June 24, 2015. The Deli describe it as "a slow burning track featuring a melody that is tele-porting us back to the days of [...] spacey American psych bands of the late '80s."

Fruit & Flowers released their debut six-track EP, entitled Drug Tax, on June 30, 2017. The record release party for Drug Tax was held at Baby's All Right in Brooklyn on June 29. The music video for the lead single "Out of Touch" released on May 17, 2017. It was directed by Thomas Ignatius, and features footage of the band on the beach. Fruit & Flowers performed at Little Dickman Records' Rock or Die showcase at the South by Southwest musical festival in 2016 and 2017, at the North Jersey Indie Rock Festival on September 23, 2017. Fruit & Flowers released a live album with Audiotree on July 27, 2017, which contains an unreleased song "Inside Decides."

== Members ==
- Ana Becker – guitar and vocals
- Jose Berrio – drums
- Lyzi Wakefield – guitar and vocals
- Claire Wardlaw – saxophone and synthesizer
- Caroline Yoder – vocals and bass

== Discography ==
EPs

- Drug Tax (2017)

Singles

- "Turquoise" (2015)
- "Out of Touch" (2017)
- "Subway Surfer" (2017)
- "Run Run Run" (2019)
