= Fa Sol La =

EP by Those Mockingbirds
- Released: September 13, 2011
- Genre: Alternative rock
- Length: 17:24
- Label: Self-released

Those Mockingbirds chronology
BETA: alpha (2011)	Fa Sol La (2011)	Penny the Dreadful (2014)

Fa Sol La is the third studio EP from the American rock band Those Mockingbirds.

== Content ==
The six-track EP was released on 12-inch (300 mm) vinyl and as a free digital download, on 13 September 2011. The limited edition vinyl issue, which was pressed by United Record Pressing in Nashville, Tennessee, includes a full-color, double sided, hand-numbered insert, an 11 in × 17 in (280 mm × 430 mm) signed band poster, a handmade keychain by Tory Daines, a 2 in × 3 in (51 mm × 76 mm) sticker, and a digital download card for an alternate unreleased version of the song "Coast to Coast." Fa Sol La contains two instrumental tracks, and draws comparison to the music of Smashing Pumpkins, and Arcade Fire. The song "The Difference Between Love and Addiction" was almost included on the EP, but instead was released as a stand-alone single, on April 24, 2012.

== Reception ==
A review of the EP by The Aquarian Weekly says the "darker yet still hooky sound [and] edgier take on composition in Fa Sol La [...] have a melancholic feel to them." They note the song "Coast to Coast" "explosive [with] catchy, angst-filled lyrics over the closest thing to pop you'll get from this record[,] in contrast to the fiery "Don't Stray" is fairly somber with a slick, bluesy guitar solo." The review closes with saying Fa Sol La got "a rise out of me like an energy drink despite its murky feel. I have a feeling that this release won't get old. Kudos to you, Those Mockingbirds. The Deli describes "Mountain Slang I" begins with "gentle waves of sound then segues into crashing guitars" on "Coast to Coast." They describe "Don't Stray" as "folksy and balladic," "The Bloodiest Gums" as "polka-esque," "We're Animals" as "visceral," and end with noting Fa Sol La "comes full circle with [the] serene instrumental track, "Mountain Slang II.""

Jim Testa in The Jersey Journal writes Those Mockingbirds' EP offers "strong melodies and vocal harmonies, and the grace of Tory Daines' contributions on violin and keyboards [...] on slower, softer songs like romantic "Don't Stray" or the eerie "The Bloodiest Gums" make[s] the most of their folk/rock influences. Lead singer/guitarist Adam Bird's powerful vocals that tend to be the focal point here, which range from supple and seductive to bold and blaring depending on the mood of the song." He includes the album in his list of Honorable Mentions in the Top Pick's of 2012.

== Track listing ==
No.	Title	Length
1.	"Mountain Slang I"	1:26
2.	"Coast to Coast"	3:54
3.	"Don't Stray"	3:57
4.	"The Bloodiest Gums"	1:51
5.	"We're Animals"	4:14
6.	"Mountain Slang II"	2:02
Total length:		17:24

== Personnel ==
- Adam Bird – vocals and guitar
- Tory Anne Daines – vocals, keys and violin
- Jonathan Gianino – guitar
- Rob Fitzgerald – bass and vocals
- Kevin Walters – drums and vocals
