= The Beat the Sound the Dragon's Roar =

EP by Rock N Roll Hi Fives
- Released: 21 October 2016
- Genre: Rock and roll, indie rock
- Length: 21:12
- Label: Little Dickman Records

Rock N Roll Hi Fives chronology
Gold Glitter Shoes (2015)	The Beat the Sound the Dragon's Roar (2016)	Re-introducing the RocknRoll Hi-Fives (2018)

The Beat the Sound the Dragon's Roar is the third studio EP from the American rock band Rock N Roll Hi Fives.

== Content ==
The six-track EP was released on compact disc and digital download with Little Dickman Records, their first with the label, on 21 October 2016. In The Asbury Park Press, Joe Centeno says "we wrote these songs to have fun, play fast, loud, and to wake up the beast." The album draws comparison to the music of the B-52's, the Stooges, and the Ramones. Rock N Roll Hi Fives performed The Beat the Sound the Dragon's Roar in its entirety, plus a rendition of "We Got the Beat" by the Go-Go's, on the college radio station WRSU on 21 October 2016. The record release party was held at the Asbury Park Yacht Club on 22 October, with Deal Casino and hosting by Mantas.

== Reception ==
A review by The Aquarian Weekly says "utilizing the performance moxie of Debbie Harry and the arrangement talent of the Dead Boys, Eilee commands her craft like those many years her senior [...] and she is a hell of a vocalist." They call "El Sueno" their favorite song on the EP, describing it a "melodic and addictive vocal barrage [..] flanked by the rest of the famil[ies'] vicious punk rock attack." Courier News describes The Beat the Sound the Dragon's Roar as "angst-riddled punk-pop tunes," adding that "the angry albeit adorable braces-clad lass has quite the catharsis in RRHFs' mix of '50s rock, '60s bubblegum, and '70s punk, especially when Pop comes through with tasty chords and riffs to make the family affair a feast of frantic fun."

== Tracklisting ==
No.	Title	Length
1.	"TKO"	2:38
2.	"El Sueno"	3:40
3.	"(You Got Me) Tongue Tied"	4:31
4.	"Blast Away With You"	3:09
5.	"Glass Towns"	3:07
6.	"Running Nowhere"	4:07
Total length:		21:12

== Personnel ==
- Eilee Centeno – vocals and theremin
- Evren Centeno – drums
- Gloree Centeno – bass
- Joe Centeno – guitars and backing vocals
