= The End of the World (Adam and the Plants album) =

Studio album by Adam and the Plants
- Released: 1 May 2015
- Studio: Room 210, Passaic, New Jersey
- Genre: Indie rock
- Length: 37:42
- Label: Self-released
- Producer: Adam Copeland

Adam and the Plants chronology
The End of the World (2015)	Born with the Gift of Magic (2017)

The End of the World is the debut studio album from the American rock band Adam and the Plants.

== Content ==
The ten-track folk rock album was self-released on compact disc and digital download, on 1 May 2015. It was produced by Adam Copeland at Room 210, in Passaic, New Jersey, mixed by Skylar Adler at Skylar Ross Recording, and mastered by Alan Douches at West West Side Music. The End of the World features electric guitars, strings, and subtle bass and percussion. Copeland sites musical influence from the artists Neil Young, and Alex Chilton, and the genres of krautrock, shoegaze, and 1990s hip-hop. Copeland explains The End of the World is thematically about "work[ing] through personal struggles and demons that brought him from the end of one world, or life, to start another." The song "Texas" was released as a single, in the Autumn of 2014.

Tris McCall says the song "Texas" is "a good one [...] from the ever-sharp songwriter Adam N. Copeland [and] a showcase for his storytelling and scene-setting, and it's set to guitar accompaniment that feels reminiscent of Good Earth-era Feelies." The Jersey Journal calls The End of the World "great [and] really dynamic," describing it as an "apocalyptic journey [that] features "three guitars fighting over the scraps of a rhythm" and the gentle sound of waves crashing onto the shore." NJ.com describes it as a "wonderfully smart and accessible alt-rock album."

== Track listing ==
No.	Title	Length
1.	"Cheating to Win"	2:53
2.	"Dedicated"	4:11
3.	"Texas"	3:41
4.	"Getting Back Up from Little Falls"	2:41
5.	"Last Man Standing"	3:28
6.	"Heartbeat"	1:32
7.	"Wormwood Star"	5:31
8.	"Violins"	4:12
9.	"Apocalypse Blues"	3:15
10.	"Maybe I'm No Good"	6:20
Total length:		37:42

== Personnel ==
- Adam Copeland – vocals, guitars, keys and percussion
- Shawn Fichtner – drums on "Cheating to Win," "Violins" and "Apocalypse Blues"
- Scott Kith – guitar and vocals
- Gary Laurie – guitar
- Lloyd Naideck – drums on "Dedicated," "Texas," "Getting Back Up from Little Falls," "Last Man Standing," "Heartbeat," "Wormwood Star" and "Maybe I'm No Good"
- Henry Prol – bass and vocals
