= Psychiatric Metaphors =

American rock band

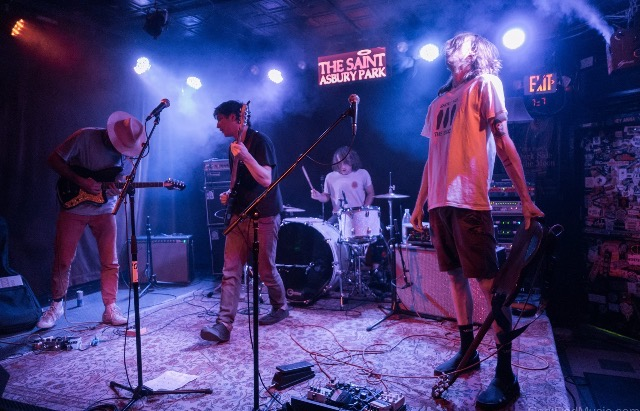
- Psychiatric Metaphors live in Asbury Park, New Jersey

Background information
- Origin: Brooklyn, New York City and New Jersey, U.S.
- Genres: Psychedelic punk, Neo-psychedelia, Alt-Country, Post punk, garage rock,
- Years active: 2013–present
- Labels: King Pizza Records, Little Dickman Records, Acid on Toast Records
- Members: Samuel Taylor
- Website: https://psychiatric-metaphors.bandcamp.com

Psychiatric Metaphors / PSYCH METS is an American rock band and multi instrumentalist from New Jersey.

== History ==
Also known as PSYCH METS, Psychiatric Metaphors is the music project of multi-instrumentalist Samuel Taylor, from New Jersey. Described as "brimming with angst, action, and undiluted rock fury," and it is compared to the music of early Black Sabbath, Joy Division and Sonic Youth by The Aquarian Weekly. Taylors music is difficult to pin down genre wise as each album comes with new elements drawing inspiration from a plethora of musical influences. Taylor released two demo albums in 2013 and 2014, and the eight-track debut album 33 Thorne Street on cassette tape and digital download with King Pizza Records on 3 April 2015. The Deli compares the record to the music of Sonic Youth, Golden Animals and Moby Grape, and note that it "mines the quarries of 60's psychedelia." In 2015, Psychiatric Metaphors performed at the CMJ music festival. They released their second ten-track album, entitled The Seeker, on cassette tape and digital download with Pizza King Records on 21 November 2015

Psychiatric Metaphors digitally released a six-track EP Psychiatric Metaphors, and a four-track version on 7"-inch black and green vinyl, with Little Dickman Records, on 26 August 2016. The album is described by Impose as having a "heavy metal sound that would surely be found in one's nightmares [with] earlier punk stylings [and] reverb for days. That year, they toured the Midwest and Southeast United States with Little Dickman Records artists. Psychiatric Metaphors performed at the North Jersey Indie Rock Festival on 23 September 2017.

In November 2019, Psychiatric Metaphors released the Sci-fi dystopian future set concept album "Hotel Radiation" on Acid on Toast Records. Then on January 9, 2021, they released the fourth album, Body Snatchers, on Acid on Toast Records. Infinite Spin Radio described the record, "Psychiatric Metaphors have come out of 2020 with a head full of inner static made of anxiety, angst and the sheer will to exorcise the restless demons. Body Snatchers shows a culmination of sounds from past albums all the while pushing forward into new sonic territories...Psych Punk is NOT dead and this is a perfect example that any art form can evolve into something that is refreshing and separates itself from its predecessors. Ultimately, you can’t pigeon hole these sounds in this album because it pulls from many corners."

On May 22, 2021, Psychiatric Metaphors released their 5th LP "Songs From An Apartment" on Acid On Toast Records. Taylor said about the record, "This album is different than most Psych Mets albums of late. Recorded at the same time and meant to be antithesis to the last LP "Body Snatchers", "Songs From An Apartment" is Psychiatric Metaphors toned back but more true to the roots of the very first demos and EP's "

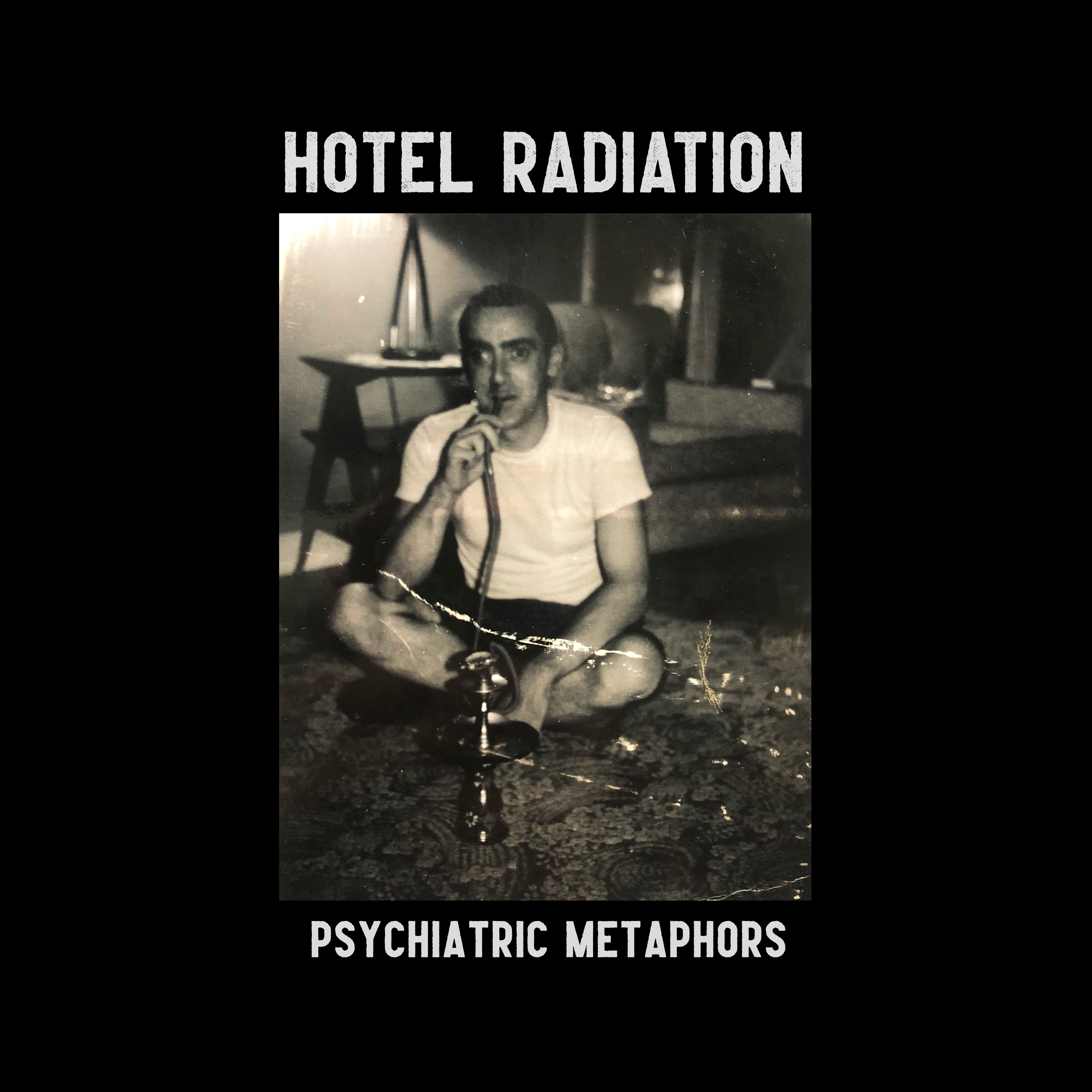
Hotel Radiation Album Art

Taylor continues to have a prolific output releasing yet another full length LP on April 22, 2022. The latest effort, "Surrealist Realities" is described by Taylor as having, "lyrics based around the surrealist and automatic writings...this album ventures into some of the darkest sonic territories yet to be explored by the Metaphors while simultaneously diving into a new form of poetry/lyrical style not seen on previous albums...combining the sounds of post-rock, psych-punk, noise rock and more into a neo-psych blender of strange psychedelic imagery. "

== Discography ==
Albums

- Northeastern Industrial (2025)
- DEEP BREAK (2024)
- Flower Market Exchange (2023)
- Surrealist Realities (2022)
- Songs From An Apartment (2021)
- Body Snatchers (2021)
- Hotel Radiation (2019)
- The Seeker (2015)
- 33 Thorne Street (2015)

EPs

- Psychiatric Metaphors (2016)

Demos

- Psych Mets 2 (2019)
- Psych Mets Demo (2014)
- Demos (2013)

== Members ==
- Samuel Taylor – vocals and instrumentation

== Live members ==
- Patrick Brenner – bass/vocals
- Mike Bongi – drums/guitar/vocals
- Rich Rogers – guitar/vocals
- Mike Nugent – drums
