= The Clydes =

American rock band

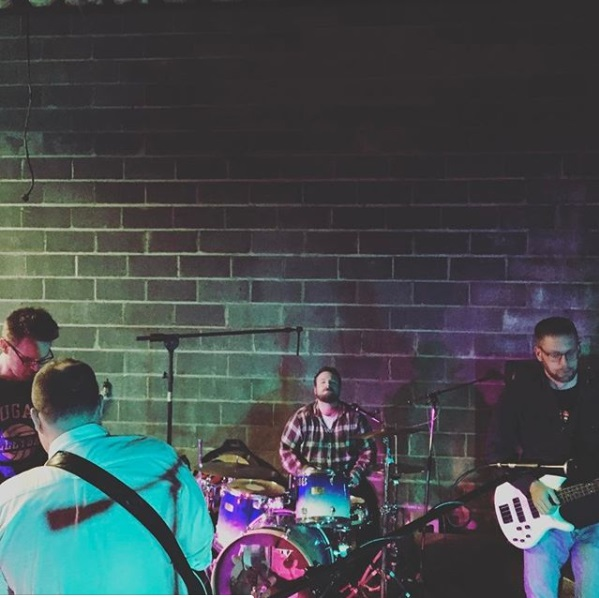

Background information
- Origin: New Brunswick, New Jersey, U.S.
- Genres: Alternative rock, indie rock
- Years active: 2009–present
- Label: Mint 400 Records
- Members: Andrew Lord Chandler; Pete Gambino; Brent Johnson; Brian Johnson

The Clydes are an American rock band from New Jersey.

== History ==
The Clydes are an alternative rock and pop rock quartet from New Brunswick, New Jersey that started in 2009, led by vocalist, guitarist and keyboardist Brent Johnson and lead guitarist Brian Johnson, who are brothers. Previously, the Johnsons were members of alt-rock band Rest Assured, when they were students at Rutgers University. That group released the album The Most Popular Girl in the Sea in 2004. A few years later, longtime friend and fellow Rutgers graduate, bassist Andrew Lord Chandler joined the Johnsons when they decided to form a new band, which would become the Clydes. They named the new group after NBA legend Walt "Clyde" Frazier.

The Clydes released three records independently. The seven-track EP The Cindy Bannon Sessions was released on 22 February 2010, and their second EP, the six-track EP Generator, was released on 9 December 2013. The first full-length album by the Clydes, Hiding from the Summer was released on 22 May 2015, and by that year the Clydes "buil[t] a name for themselves by playing venues throughout the Northeast," like the Stone Pony and the Bitter End. They were in contact with several labels who were showing interest in their music, before signing with Mint 400 Records in 2016.

=== Mint 400 Records ===
In 2016, the Clydes released Comeback Charlie, a five-song EP produced by Neil Sabatino. The Clydes performed at the 2016 North Jersey Indie Rock Festival. They released the album So the Story Goes on 20 October 2017. The track "The Vampire Of Hanover" was written from the point of view of Fritz Haarmann, a German serial killer from the early 20th century. Neil Sabatino, Mint 400's owner, produced the album and directed the music video for the first single, "Holly Speaks."

The Clydes covered The Beatles' "Your Mother Should Know" for the Mint 400 compilation album At the Movies in 2018.

== Members ==
- Andrew Lord Chandler – bass, keyboards, vocals (2009–present)
- Pete Gambino – drums, vocals (2019–present)
- Brian Johnson – lead guitar, keyboards (2009–present)
- Brent Johnson – lead vocals, rhythm guitar, keyboards (2009–present)

=== Past members ===
- Jon Barratt (under the name MadMardigan) – drums, vocals (2013–2019)
- Vinnie Quaglieri — drums (2010-2013)
- Daniel Temkin — drums (2009-2010)

== Discography ==
Albums

- Hiding from the Summer (2015)
- So the Story Goes (2017)
- Old-Time Monarchy (2019)

EPs

- The Cindy Bannon Sessions (2010)
- Generator (2013)
- Comeback Charlie (2016)
- Lucid Garden (2017)

Appearing on

- The 1st Annual 24 Hour Songwriting Challenge (2014)
- The 2nd Annual 24 Hour Songwriting Challenge (2015)
- The 3rd Annual 24 Hour Songwriting Challenge (2016)
- In a Mellow Tone (2015)
- At the Movies (2018)
- NJ / NY Mixtape (2018)
