= Yawn Mower =

American rock band

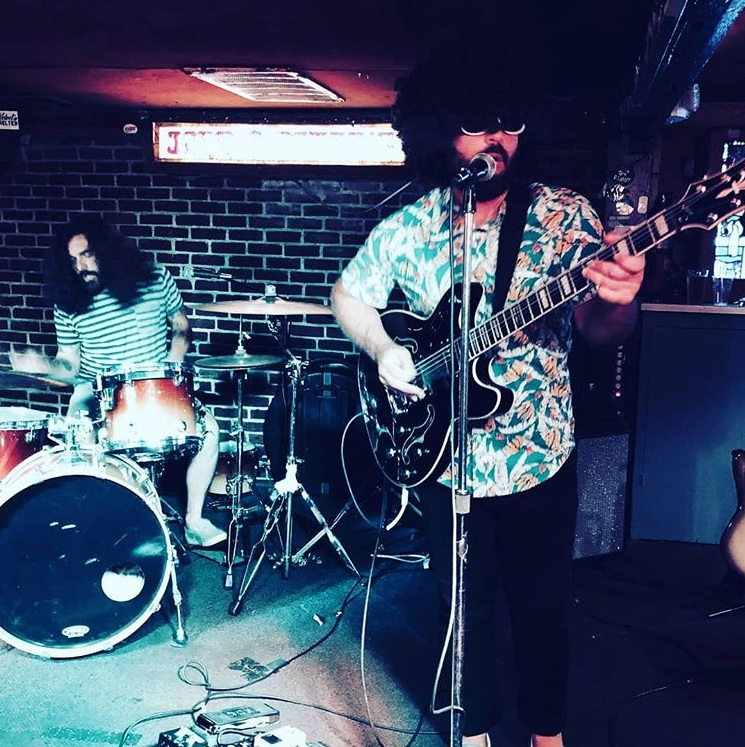
- Yawn Mower live in 2018

Background information
- Origin: Asbury Park, New Jersey, U.S.
- Genres: Alternative rock
- Years active: 2015–present
- Labels: In the Clouds, Mint 400
- Members: Mike Chick; Biff Swenson
- Website: yawnmower.com

Yawn Mower are an American rock band from Asbury Park, New Jersey.

== History ==
Yawn Mower are a rock duo from Asbury Park, New Jersey that formed in 2015. While in their former bands, guitarist and vocalist Mike Chick and drummer Biff Swenson met playing shows in Seaside Heights and Asbury Park, and considered jamming, which began after Chick bought a baritone guitar and suggested they start a two-piece band. Yawn Mower is known for their fuzz-rock guitars, crunchy hooks and sense of humor as The Jersey Journal describes their blend of music to be "spazzy surf rock" and a "comedic two-man guitar/drums act who look and sound like two of The Muppets." They released several EPs independently and on in the Clouds Records, and opened for the alternative rock band Electric Six.

=== Mint 400 records ===
In 2018, Yawn Mower signed with Mint 400 Records and released two singles, "Kickstand" and "Local Summer," which would appear on the EP Could Eat, Would Sleep. Swenson notes the EP is "the most-produced record and the most time we've spent on a recording to get the sound the way we wanted." "Kickstand" is about "relying on friends to make through some tough or wild times," and in the Asbury Park Press, Chick describes "Local Summer" as a "tribute to the post-Labor Day days at the Jersey Shore when the tourists leave but the days are still warm [...] the song is half carefree because when local summer comes around, everybody who is local is excited because they feel they're going to get their beach town back from everybody who comes and vacations over the summer."

Could Eat, Would Sleep was released on April 20, 2018, and is listed on music journalist Jim Testa's Top New Jersey EPs of 2018. Yawn Mower performed at the North Jersey Indie Rock Festival on October 6, 2018.

Yawn Mower took part in the Speak into My Good Eye annual 24 Hour Songwriting Challenge, with the song "It's All Non-Stop." They also contributed a cover of "I Love You All" that appears in the 2014 film Frank for the Mint 400 Records compilation At the Movies. In 2019, they released a 90s-themed five-track compilation, entitled Why Work Harder Than You Have To.

In 2022 the band revamped, going from a duo to a seven piece at various shows. Their album "To Each Their Own Coat" spent 3 weeks on the NACC charts starting in September 2022.

== Members ==
- Mike Chick – vocals and baritone guitar
- Biff Swenson – drums

== Discography ==
LPs

- To Each Their Own Coat (2022)
- I Just Can't Wait To Die (2025)

EPs

- Get to the Boat (2016)
- Yawn Mower Ruins Christmas (2016)
- What's All This New Piss? (2017)
- Could Eat, Would Sleep (2018)

Singles

- "Kickstand" (2018)
- "Local Summer" (2018)

Compilations

- Covers (2016)
- More Covers (2017)
- Waffle House (2018)
- Why Work Harder Than You Have To (2019)

Appearing on

- The 4th Annual 24 Hour Songwriting Challenge (2017)
- At the Movies (2018)
- NJ / NY Mixtape (2018)
