= Guilty Giraffe =

American rock band

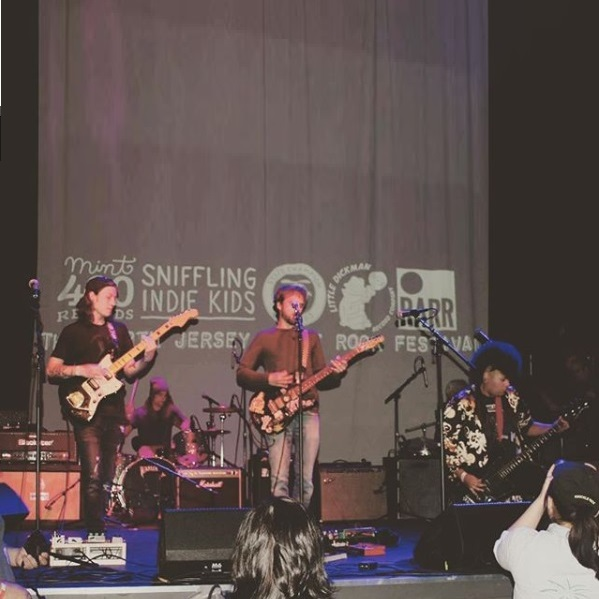
- Guilty Giraffe at the 2018 North Jersey Indie Rock Festival.

Background information
- Origin: Yonkers, New York, U.S.
- Genres: Rock, post-hardcore, shoegaze
- Years active: 2015–present
- Labels: Mint 400 Records
- Members: Kevin Knebel; Mathew McGinnis; Shane Sumano; Will Vellek

Guilty Giraffe are an American rock band from New York.

== History ==
Guilty Giraffe started as a rock duo from Yonkers, New York that formed in 2015. Both members were self-taught musicians. They self-produced and released their debut album A Time to Slime in December 2015. They have been classified as post-hardcore and shoegaze. Guilty Giraffe made The A.V. Club's 2017 Year In Band Names list. In 2017, they signed to the independent record label Mint 400 Records.

=== Mint 400 Records ===
Their second album, Server Error. was released with Mint 400 Records on 9 May 2017. Will Vellek joined Guilty Giraffe in the Winter of 2018 on bass, and they played as a three-piece for a while, until Reis quit Guilty Giraffe in Spring of 2018 to follow other musical endeavors. Guilty Giraffe rebuilt the line-up, adding Kevin Knebel on drums, and Shane Sumano on bass. For the Mint 400 Records compilation NJ / NY Mixtape, which features artists that performed at 2018 North Jersey Indie Rock Festival, Guilty Giraffe contributed the song "Off Ripped." They also released their third album Filtered in 2018, which was new versions of music written by Mat Mcginnis years prior.

== Members ==
- Mathew McGinnis – vocals and guitar (2015–present)
- Will Vellek – bass (2018) and guitar (2018–present)
- Shane Sumano – bass (2018–present)
- Kevin Knebel – drums (2018–present)

Former members

- Felipe Reis – drums (2015–2018)

== Discography ==
Albums

- A Time To Slime (2015)
- Server Error (2017)
- Filtered (2018)
- Pacing (2021)

Singles

- "Washed Out" (2017)
- "Hungry Cats" (2018)
- "Off Ripped" (2018)
- "Filter" (2018)

Appearing on

- NJ / NY Mixtape (2018)
