= Those Mockingbirds =

American alternative rock band

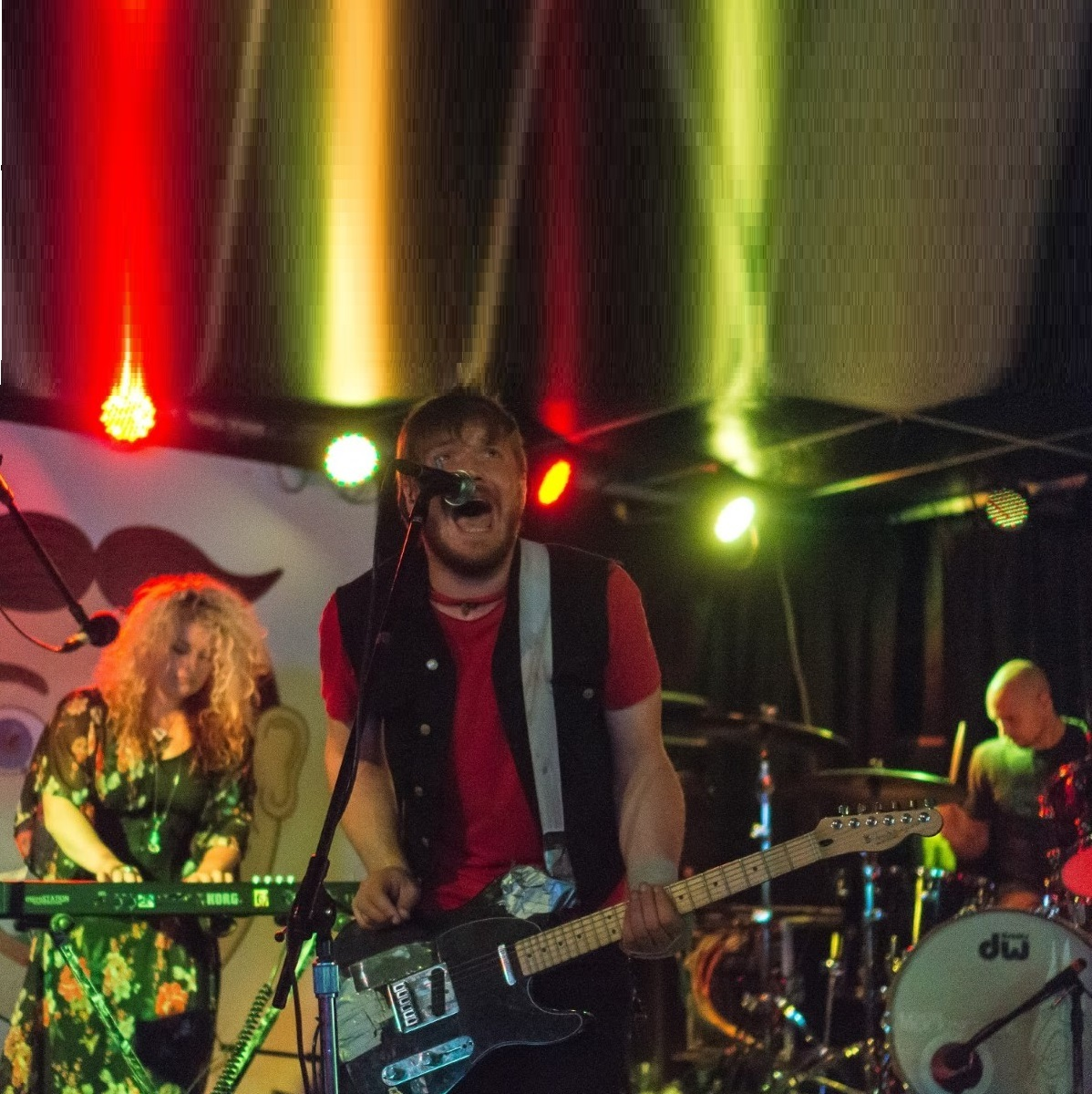
- Those Mockingbirds at Wonder Bar, Asbury Park, New Jersey, 2015

Background information
- Origin: Montclair, New Jersey, U.S.
- Genres: Grunge, alternative rock
- Years active: 2009–2016
- Past members: Adam Bird; Tory Daines; Jonathan Gianino; Rob Fitzgerald; Kevin Walters; Kyle Walters; Matt Yeager; Dominick Lettera; Dane Zarra; Dan Kreiner; Leanne Bowes

Those Mockingbirds were an American alternative rock band from New Jersey.

== History ==
Those Mockingbirds were a three-piece alternative rock band from Montclair, New Jersey that formed in 2009. They were described as "combining elements of prog, alt, hard, and classic rock into a loud, but accessible mix," and list the Smashing Pumpkins, Fleetwood Mac and Led Zeppelin as musical inspirations. Those Mockingbirds began by playing shows across the Northeast of the United States, and promoting the band at places like shopping malls and parking lots.

In April 2010, they released their first studio recording No Symmetry, which features heavy keyboard effects and "sugary vocals," on their own label, L.E. Records, with distribution from SideCho Records. It was produced by Those Mockingbirds and former editor-in-chief of Revolver Magazine Tom Beaujour, and recorded at Nuthouse Studio & White Heat Studio. No Symmetry debuted at No. 1 on Amazon's Movers & Shakers chart. A video was released that indicated Those Mockingbirds kidnapped Gary Brolsma, known from the Numa Numa internet meme video, for a ransom of 50,000 downloads of their single "Honest? Honest." The music video for the song was released later that year, after it achieved 50,000 downloads. Those Mockingbirds were part of the New Brunswick-based artist collective Tiny Giant. The next single Those Mockingbirds released was a studio cover of "The Chain" by Fleetwood Mac in January 2011, which was recorded by Shawn Kimon, and produced by Those Mockingbirds at The Wild Arctic in Queens, New York. In February 2011, Those Mockingbirds filmed a Fearless Music session for the Fox television network WNYW. They released a limited edition compact disc of BETA: alpha during a show with Smoking Popes and Girl in a Coma, at Mexicali Live in Teaneck, New Jersey on May 6, 2011. The self-released EP contained an acoustic version of No Symmetry's "We are the Antidote," "The Bloodiest Gums" and a cover of the Nico Blues' song "Living Proof."

On September 13, 2011, Those Mockingbirds released the six-track EP Fa Sol La as a free download. It was recorded at Wild Arctic by Shawn Kimon and Dean Baltulonis, and by Kevin Walters at Sleeping In Sanity Studios, and mixed by Howard Willing. The September 2011 issue of The Aquarian Weekly lists Those Mockingbirds as one of the 10 Bands on the Verge, and awarded them one year of promotion. They were also listed at No. 3 on The Kings of A&R Top 8 Emerging Artists for 2011. On October 19, 2011, they played at the CMJ festival. Those Mockingbirds were included by Tris McCall for the AM radio station WCBS' special for the 20th anniversary of grunge. Their song "Coast to Coast" appears on music journalist Jim Testa's Top 20 Songs of 2011. On January 31, 2012, Starbeat Music released Fa Sol La on 12"-vinyl, which featured an alternate version of track of "Coast to Coast." The commercial FM radio station WRAT ran a week-long promotional campaign that culminated in the debut of the song "The Difference Between Love and Addiction" a few days before it was made available online. It is described by Speak Into My Good Eye as "a spiraling composition with jagged, flame-licked peaks, charred to the core by the fierce fret-work." It was produced by Those Mockingbirds, and recorded by Pat Noon at Eight 16 Studios. Those Mockingbirds performed at the Northside Festival on June 14, 2012, and in July they opened for Armor for Sleep's New York City reunion show at Irving Plaza. Kyle Walters, brother of drummer Kevin Walters, joined the group after Jonathan Gianino departed.

Those Mockingbirds' ten-track debut album, Penny the Dreadful, was released on July 1, 2014, and they promoted the record with music videos for "A Ballad from Hell," "How to Rob a Bank" and "Destroy My Love." The video for "How to Rob a Bank" was directed by John Komar, and won the MTVU Freshman competition. On September 30, 2014, Those Mockingbirds released the song "Horns & Tails," which feature guest vocals by Reese Van Riper. On November 4, 2014, Those Mockingbirds released a cover of Paul McCartney & Wings' "Jet" for the Treehouse Sound Breast Cancer compilation. In 2017, Adam Bird started the electronic rock project aBIRD.

According to their Facebook page, the band broke up in February 2016.

== Past members ==
- Adam Bird – vocals and guitar
- Tory Daines – violin, vocals and piano
- Jonathan Gianino – guitar
- Rob Fitzgerald – bass guitar
- Kevin Walters – drums, vocals and percussion
- Kyle Walters – guitar
- Dominick Lettera – bass guitar, vocals
- Matt Yeager – drums
- Dane Zarra – guitar
- Dan Kreiner – guitar
- Leanne Bowes – bass guitar

== Discography ==
Albums

- Penny the Dreadful (2014)

EPs

- No Symmetry (2010)
- BETA: alpha (2011)
- Fa Sol La (2011)

Singles

- "Honest? Honest." (2010)
- "We are the Antidote" (2010)
- "The Chain" (2010)
- "Coast to Coast" (2011)
- "The Difference Between Love and Addiction" (2012)
- "How to Rob a Bank" (2013)
- "A Ballad from Hell" (2014)
- "Destroy My Love" (2014)
- "Model Myself" (2014)

Music videos

- "Honest? Honest."
- "We are the Antidote"
- "A Ballad from Hell"
- "How to Rob a Bank"
- "Destroy My Love"
