= The Brixton Riot =

American rock group

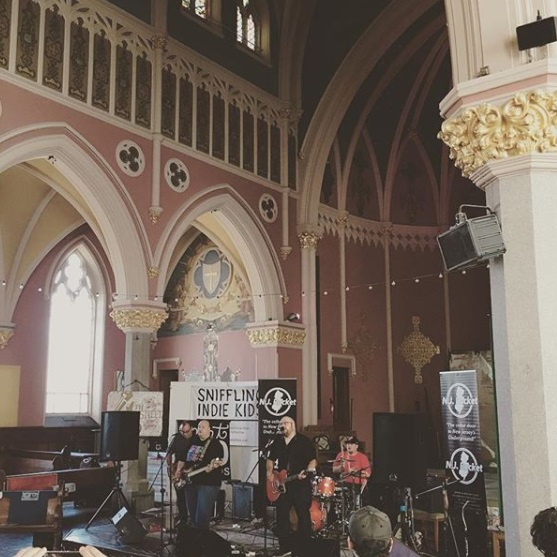
- The Brixton Riot at the 2017 North Jersey Indie Rock Festival.

Background information
- Origin: New Jersey
- Genres: Rock, power pop
- Years active: 2006–present
- Label: Mint 400 Records
- Members: Steve Hass; Matt Horutz; Jerry Lardieri; Mark Wright
- Website: www.brixtonriot.com

The Brixton Riot are an American rock band from New Jersey.

== History ==
The Brixton Riot are a four-piece rock band from New Jersey that formed in 2006. The name is a reference to the 1981 altercation between police and residents of the South London neighborhood, as well as a nod to English rock band the Clash's song "The Guns of Brixton." The band has often stated in interviews that the name was meant as "more of a sonic association than a social or political statement." Their music draws comparisons to punk and indie rock bands of the late 1980s and early 1990s including the Replacements, Guided by Voices and Hüsker Dü. Their first live performance was in February 2007, at The Loop Lounge in Passaic, New Jersey, which was followed later that Spring and Summer with additional shows, including an opening slot for the rock band Cracker, at Jenkinsons in Point Pleasant Beach, New Jersey. Their debut release was a five-track EP titled Sudden Fiction, which came out on the band's short lived Tabbycat Records label, on 12 February 2008. It was recorded in December 2007, with Don Sternecker at his Mix-O-Lydian recording studio. Phil Rainone of Jersey Beat described the EP as "hooky bits of pop punk (the good stuff) [that] run rampant through all the tunes; so much so that I needed repeated listenings to absorb the clever lyrics and song imagery."

Their debut full-length, Palace Amusements, was released on 13 March 2012, and The Deli columnist Mike Levine describes the record as "good natured power pop that could only come out of my home state of New Jersey," adding that "with its peaks and valleys, [it is] reminiscent of some of the Lemonheads' best work." A review in The Aquarian Weekly says "in its entirety, Palace Amusements just flows from one solid song to the next without disappointing the listener [and] there really is a little bit of everything stuck into the DNA that makes up the disc." Their song "Signal to Noise" inspired the name of the college radio station WFDU's popular indie-rock radio show hosted by Al Crisafulli, which shares the same name. The Brixton Riot appear on the 2014 Dromedary Records' compilation, From '93 'til Infinity.

=== Mint 400 Records ===
The Brixton Riot met Neil Sabatino through a mutual friend. and signed with the Mint 400 Records label in January 2017, and they released their second full-length, Close Counts, on 6 October 2017. It was recorded live on tape in twenty hours, over a course of two days. The record release party was held at Asbury Yacht Club with Dentist and the Rock N Roll Hi Fives, and hosted by CoolDad Music. The album was ranked No. 9 by Bob Makin in The Aquarian Weekly's Top Albums of 2017. That year they performed at the North Jersey Indie Rock Festival on 23 September, and their song "Can't Stop Now" appears on the Mint 400 Records compilation album, NJ / NY Mixtape.

In 2018, the Brixton Riot contributed a cover of "Bring on the Dancing Horses" for the Mint 400 Records compilation album, At the Movies. The music video for "Bring on the Dancing Horses" was directed by Horutz. Since 2015, the Brixton Riot record a holiday song for Jon Solomon's 25 Hour Holiday Radio Show every year.

== Band members ==
- Steve Hass – bass and vocals
- Matt Horutz – drums
- Jerry Lardieri – vocals and guitar
- Mark Wright – guitar

== Discography ==
Albums

- Palace Amusements (2012)
- Close Counts (2017)

EPs

- Sudden Fiction (2008)

Appearing on

- From '93 'til Infinity (2014)
- NJ / NY Mixtape (2017)
- At the Movies (2018)
