= The Royal Arctic Institute =

American rock band

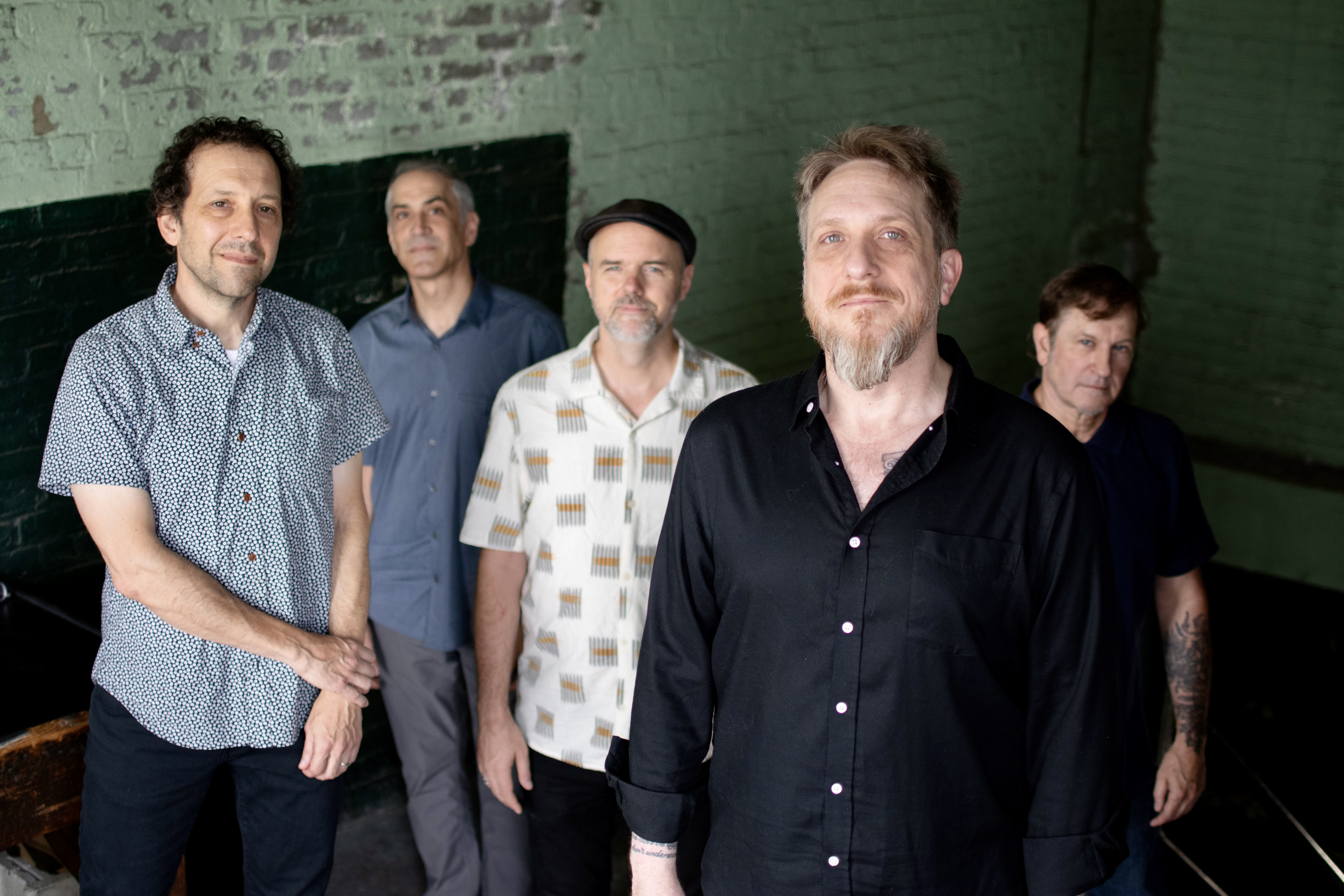
- The Royal Arctic Institute 2022

Background information
- Origin: New York, New York, U.S.
- Genres: Instrumental music, jazz, rock
- Years active: 2016–current
- Labels: Rhyme & Reason Records
- Members: Lyle Hysen; John Leon; Dave Motamed; Lynn Wright; Carl Baggaley

The Royal Arctic Institute is an instrumental rock band from New York City, United States.

== History ==
The Royal Arctic Institute is a cinematic instrumental post-jazz quintet from New York City. The band is composed of drummer Lyle Hysen (Das Damen, Arthur Lee), guitarists John Leon (Roky Erickson, Summer Wardrobe, Abra Moore) and Lynn Wright (And The Wiremen, Bee And Flower, Shilpa Ray), bassist David Motamed (Das Damen, Two Dollar Guitar, Arthur Lee, Townes Van Zandt), and keyboardist Carl Baggaley (Headbrain, Gramercy Arms). The band name is a reference to the fantasy trilogy His Dark Materials by Philip Pullman. All five members of the Royal Arctic Institute have spent decades playing in various ensembles, working as studio musicians, backing musicians, and touring musicians; Motamed and Hysen have played together since they were both 13 years old.

After a year of writing and playing shows, the Royal Arctic Institute recorded their debut album The French Method as a three piece with original bassist Gerard Smith. The recording was released on cassette tape and digital download, on May 5, 2017. The album was recorded in two weeks, and engineered and produced by Tom Beaujour at Nuthouse Recording in Hoboken, New Jersey. The song "Greely's Ghost" is described as "post-rock haze with jazz leanings" by Glide, and the music video mixes images of Leon's family and archival footage from Mobile and Gulf Shores, Alabama. The single "Russian Twists" was released on cassette tape, on July 7, 2018. A review of the song in Tiny Mix Tapes illustrates the "windows are down, wind's in our hair, and "Russian Twists" is our soundtrack, a jaunty instrumental post rock number propelling us forward as we're entranced by the highway strip, crossing state line after state line, destination unknown." Music journalist Jim Testa in The Jersey Journal says the track "exemplifies the group's approach to interactive compositions that shift and evolve through a suite of different melodies and rhythms. The Royal Arctic Institute performed at the North Jersey Indie Rock Festival on October 6, 2018.

Their second album recorded as a trio with original bassist Gerard Smith, Accidental Achievement was released with Rhyme & Reason Records on limited edition 12"-vinyl and digital download, on 18 October 2018. hMag says "this is "turn off the lights, sit in a comfortable chair, turn it up loud, and pay attention" music," and describe it as tentatively, mysteriously[,] dreamy compositions." The first single and music video, "The Grubert Effect," was inspired by French writer Mœbius' comic strip The Airtight Garage. Leon explains "like Frued's concept of the id, the ego, and the super ego[,] so [is] "The Grubert Effect" [...] essentially the means by which we transition between the three parts of the song." The song "The Lark Mirror" was remixed by indie musician Michael Benjamin Lerner and released as a single, on March 8, 2019.

RAI's E.P. "Sodium Light" was recorded and mixed by Tom Beaujour at Kaleidoscope Studios in Jersey City during the COVID-19 lockdown in the summer of 2020. The record was released on Rhyme And Reason Records in November 2020. In review of this record, Tim Haugen of Daily Vault writes "I'm not even slightly exaggerating when I say that The Royal Arctic Institute deserves to be spoken in the same sentence as instrumental giants like Mogwai, Explosions In The Sky, and Sigur Rós. Each release is somehow better than the one before it, and at this rate, their "post-everything" formula will make them the band that others aspire to parallel in terms of impact."

2021 saw the release of "From Catnap To Coma." The tracks were recorded and produced by James McNew (Yo La Tengo) in September of 2020, after the deadliest wave of COVID had passed. It’s the second disc for this iteration of Royal Arctic Institute with its two guitarists, founder John Leon and Lynn Wright. Their interaction, trading haunting slides, wavering chords and trebly clear melody defines this band’s sound.

== Members ==
- Lyle Hysen – drums
- John Leon – guitars, pedal steel guitar
- David Motamed – bass
- Lynn Wright – guitars
- Carl Baggaley – keyboards
- Gerard Smith – bass (2016–2019)

== Discography ==
Albums

- The French Method (2017)
- Accidental Achievements (2018)
- Sodium Light (2020)
- From Catnap To Coma (2021)
- The Royal Arctic Institute (2025)

Singles

- Russian Twists (2018)
- The Lark Mirror (Telekinesis Remix) (2018)
- 13 Christmases At Sea (2021)
- The Lark Mirror (BKGD AUDIO DD&G Remixes) (2021)
