= Hoboken Arts and Music Festival =

Coordinates: 40.74509°N 74.02866°W

Started in the fall of 1994, the Hoboken Spring & Fall Arts and Music Festival has presented annual artist and musical performances in Hoboken, New Jersey. The event takes place on Washington St. from Observer Highway to 7th St. In the first years, the event was only 2 to 3 blocks long with about 80 to 100 vendors. It quickly expanded to its current size, now 10 blocks long, hosts over 400 vendor spaces, has 3 stages of live performance and a special section with activities for children. The event attracts between 30,000 and 50,000 visitors every year.

== Musical and artist headliners ==
- 2017, 24th year - musical performers; include Burnt Sugar The Arkestra Chamber's Tribute to Prince, Frankie Morales and the Mambo of the Times Orchestra, RockNRoll Hi Fives, Karyn Kuhl Band, Christina Alessi & The Toll Collectors, Demolition String Band. Artists; Francine Demeulenaere showing new exhibit, "Open Windows".
- 2016, 23rd year - Musical performers; Leon Russell

In the 20 years since the creation of the festival, many musical artists have performed.

Patti Smith (played three times), Dr. John, New York Dolls, Ronnie Spector, the Smithereens, Nancy Sinatra, Yo La Tengo, Tom Tom Club, NRBQ, the Fountains of Wayne, Joan Jett, John Eddie, Ian Hunter, Richie Havens, Southside Johnny & the Asbury Jukes (played three times), the Box Tops featuring Alex Chilton, the Turtles featuring Flo & Eddie, Eric Burdon & the Animals, Mickey Dolenz of the Monkees, Leon Russell, Peter Noone (twice), Roger McGuinn of the Byrds, Mary Weiss (from The Shangri-Las), John Sebastian of the Lovin' Spoonful, Felix Cavaliere of the Young Rascals, the Feelies, the Bongos, Chris Stamey, Mike Doughty of Soul Coughing, the Swingin Neckbreakers, the Demolition String Band, Skanatra, the Health & Happiness Show, the Karyn Kuhl Band and many more.

Donovan was scheduled to perform one year, but due to predicted inclement weather the festival had to be rescheduled. Since Donovan was already on his way, flying across the Atlantic, a special concert was held at DeBaun Auditorium in Hoboken just for his performance. He was backed by a band put together by Hoboken's own James Mastro.
