= Black Wail =

American rock band

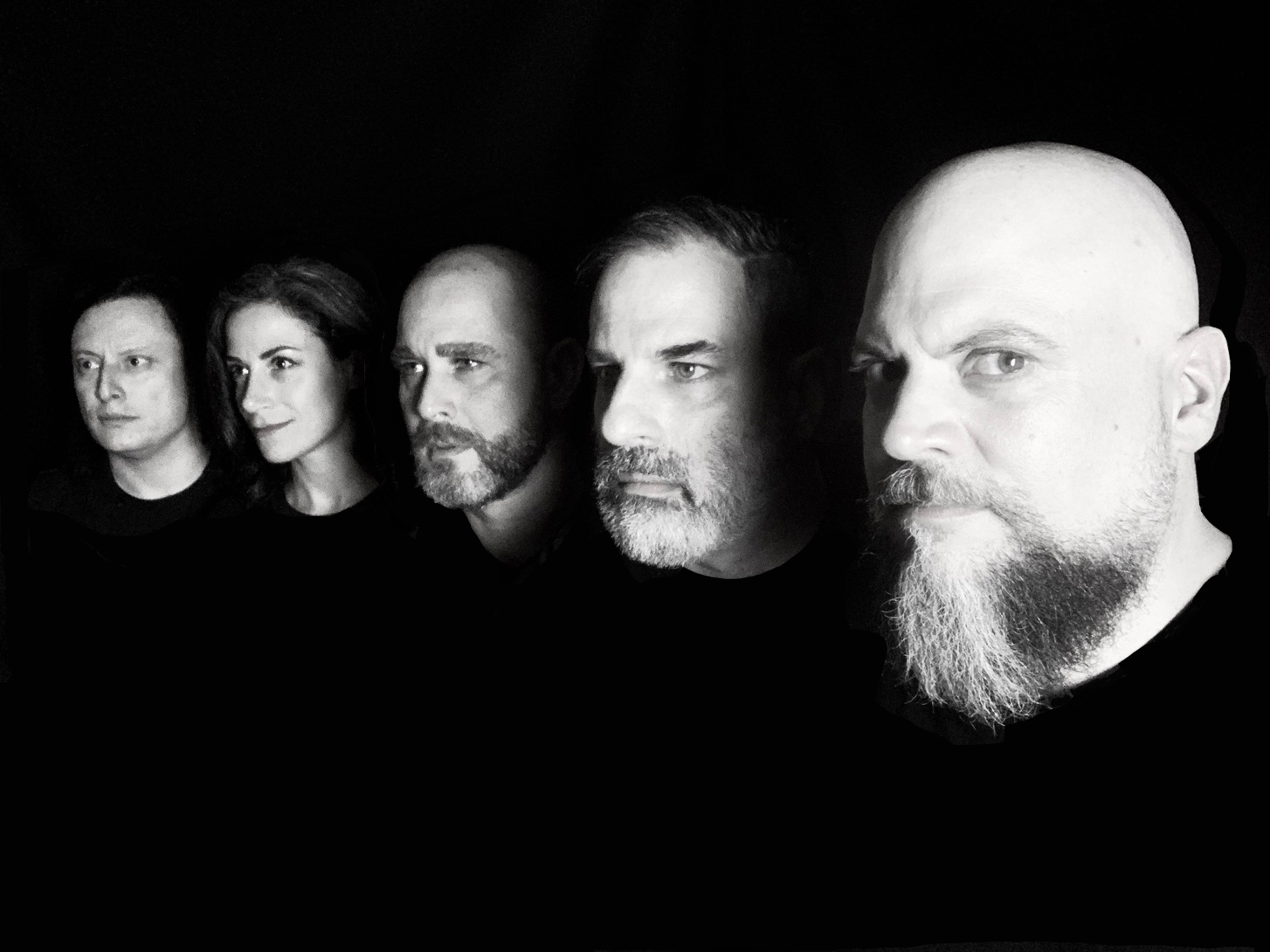
- Black Wail, 2020

Background information
- Origin: Jersey City, New Jersey, U.S.
- Genres: Rock and roll, stoner rock
- Years active: 2014–current
- Labels: Rhyme & Reason Records
- Members: Ed Charreun; Susan Lutin; Michael Tarlazzi; Bram Teitelman
- Website: blackwailband.com

Black Wail is an American rock band from New Jersey.

== History ==
Black Wail is a garage and stoner rock quintet from Jersey City, New Jersey that formed in 2014. The band is composed of drummer Ed Charreun, guitarist Bryan Elkins, bassist and vocalist Susan Lutin, and lead guitarist and vocalist Michael Tarlazzi. Tarlazzi is the former drummer for the groups Thomas Francis Takes His Chances, and Polina and the Pyramids. Their music is called "everything your mom didn't want you listening to" by The Jersey Journal and "achingly melancholy to High on Fire heavy" by MetalSucks, and classified as a blend of 1970s metal, psychedelia, punk and hard rock. The band cites musical influence from Deep Purple, Black Sabbath and Thin Lizzy. A three-track demo Other, produced by Mike Tar, was released on January 28, 2014.

Their debut four-track EP Black Wail was released on September 25, 2014. It was recorded at Moonlight Mile Studios, mixed by Mike Moebius and mastered by John Seymour. The six-track EP All You Can Eat was released on February 25, 2016, recorded by Tarlazzi, and produced by John Seymour. Chromium Homes was released in 2017. It is conceptually science fiction-themed, with lyrics focused on toxic waste, mutants, and New Jersey-specific problems. Black Wail performed at the North Jersey Indie Rock Festival on October 6, 2018.

== Members ==
- Ed Charreun – guitar and vocals
- Susan Lutin – bass and vocals
- Michael Tarlazzi – lead guitar and vocals
- Bram Teitelman – keys
- Felipe Torres – drums

=== Past members ===
- Bryan Elkins – guitar
- "Pistol Pete" Kaufmann – drums

== Discography ==
EPs

- Black Wail (2014)
- All You Can Eat (2016)
- Chromium Homes (2017)

Demos

- Other (2014)
