= Penny the Dreadful =

Studio album by Those Mockingbirds
- Released: July 1, 2014
- Genre: Grunge rock, alternative rock
- Length: 33:35
- Label: Self-released
- Producer: Dean Baltulonis

Those Mockingbirds chronology
Fa Sol La (2011)	Penny the Dreadful (2014)

Penny the Dreadful is the debut studio album by the American rock band Those Mockingbirds.

== Content ==
The ten-track album was self-released on compact disc and digital download on July 1, 2014. The band moved to New Hampshire for a month to record the album. Dean Baltulonis produced the album at the Wild Arctic in Portsmouth, New Hampshire, with the exception of "Loose Leather," recorded at Treehouse in Jersey City, New Jersey, and "I Feel Like I Died," recorded at Sleeping In Sanity Studios. It was mixed by Howard Willing at The Bear's Lair in Los Angeles, California, and mastered by Robert Vosgien at Capitol Mastering in Los Angeles. Daniel DeJesus from Rasputina plays cello on the acoustic song "I Feel Like I Died."

Penny The Dreadful is grittier than their previous releases. In an interview with The Aquarian Weekly, Adam Bird recalls the concept of making a record about a relationship that this girl named Penny had with the devil. She ended up becoming far more powerful than him, and that's why she's Penny The Dreadful. This was the first project we went into all together." Kevin Walters noted "when it comes to writing, nothing is sacred, and this was the first time we had done that." The record release party was at Backroom Studios in Rockaway, New Jersey.

A teaser video for the first single from the album entitled "A Ballad from Hell" was released in August 2013. "How to Rob a Bank," the second single from the album, was released in October 2013. A music video for the single was released the same month, and the video, which was directed by John Komar, won the MTVU Freshman competition. It also received heavy rotation from the radio station WRAT, and was included on The Village Voice's annual Pazz and Jop ballot.

== Reception ==
A review by Speak Into My Good Eye says Penny the Dreadful is "a rock and roll record that achieves a pretty impressive combination between leveraging the sounds that have launched several big-name bands to commercial success and not pandering, musically or lyrically, to the lowest common denominator." fakewalls writes that the album features "ten tracks that easily veer from soft, lush coffee shop atmospheres to grandiose stadium-like altitudes." It notes the opening track "A Ballad from Hell" "slowly slithers out of the gate with twangy guitars and Adam playing the role of a sidewalk preacher, proclaiming "Maybe we're both going to hell" to those within earshot." For the songs "Destroy My Love" and "S.A.L.T.," fakewalls notes "Tory Daines deliver[s] sonorous and sultry harmonies on her violin while "Model Myself" has Adam declaring "I won't model myself after you" backed by melodic guitars from Jonathan Gianino." The review ends with saying on Penny the Dreadful, "Those Mockingbirds have unveiled something that celebrates the band's journey so far."

Tris McCall writes "if you like hard rock, if you kinda miss grunge, if you've got a soft spot for MCR, if you're an eensy-weensy bit steampunk, if you've got a deal with the Devil going or if you're itching to sign one, Penny the Dreadful is an album worth engaging with."

== Track listing ==
No.	Title	Length
1.	"A Ballad from Hell"	2:28
2.	"How to Rob a Bank"	2:55
3.	"Teenage Fantasies"	3:37
4.	"Loose Leather"	3:17
5.	"Destroy My Love"	3:43
6.	"S.A.L.T."	4:05
7.	"Bodies on the Road"	3:12
8.	"The Reckoning"	3:35
9.	"Model Myself"	3:42
10.	"I Feel Like I Died"	3:01
Total length:		33:35

== Personnel ==
- Adam Bird – vocals and guitar
- Tory Anne Daines – vocals, keys and violin
- Jonathan Gianino – guitar
- Rob Fitzgerald – bass and vocals
- Kevin Walters – drums and vocals
