= Shane-Michael Vidaurri =

American graphic artist and musician

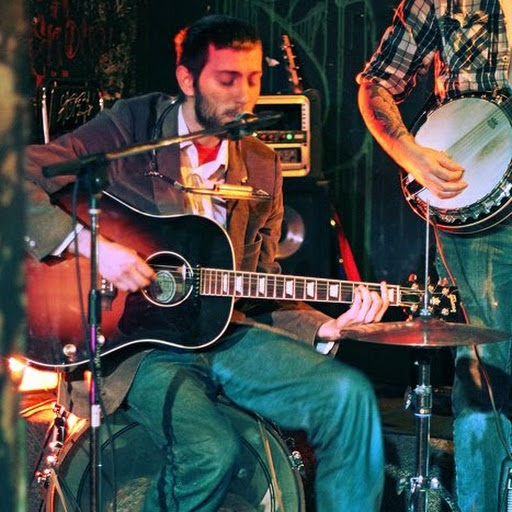
- Areas: New Jersey, U.S.
- Notable works: Iron: or, the War After; Adventure Time: Marshall Lee Spectacular

Shane-Michael Vidaurri is an American graphic artist, writer and musician.

== About ==
=== Graphic artist ===
Vidaurri received a Bachelor of Fine Arts degree in illustration from, the Philadelphia University of the Arts. His work appears in Image comics, Boom! Studios, WIN, The Indypendent and Powerpop Comics. He is the author and illustrator of the 2013 graphic novel, Iron: or, the War After, which was published by Archaia. Painted in watercolor, Iron: or, the War After is described by MTV Geek-News columnist Charles Webb as a "story of espionage, intrigue, and betrayal in the wake of a great war that has brought together the losers, victors, and victims–who all happen to be animals." In 2015, Vidaurri wrote and illustrated the story for Jim Henson's Storyteller: Witches, as well as Five Ghosts Special No. 1., and worked on the Five Ghosts Kickstarter campaign for the first and second issue. He was an illustrator for the 2017 graphic novel, Adventure Time: Marshall Lee Spectacular, and he is the writer for Kaboom!'s 2018 comic book miniseries, Steven Universe.

=== Musician ===
Vidaurri played in the bands the Ashes, along with Alec and Thomas Hanslowe. Their music is described as bringing together "tubas and violins, banjos and electric guitars, organs and jawharps, all while dabbling in the sounds of the 60's, Nashville and New Orleans," and it draws comparison to the music of the Brian Jonestown Massacre, Bright Eyes, Tom Petty, and Tom Waits. They released the albums Photoplay Music in 2010, and Sing! in 2011, with Mint 400 Records. They also played with the Old Glorys, a group consisting of the Ashes, and former Any Day Parade vocalist Melissa Jackson. They released the EP Brunswick Street Demos.

Vidaurri signed with Mint 400 Records, in 2014, as a solo artist. For the tribute album, Transformed: A Tribute to Lou Reed, Vidaurri does a rendition of the song "I'm Set Free." Jersey Beat says Vidaurri "plucks a perfect song from the Velvet Underground songbook with a simple acoustic rendition." He released the album The Cat Man is Sad in 2015, and performed at the 2016 North Jersey Indie Rock Festival. He also released the albums The Cat Man Returns in 2017, and The Cat Man Is On His Own Again in 2018.

== Published works ==
- Iron: or, the War After (2013)
- Jim Henson's Storyteller: Witches (2015)
- Five Ghosts (2015)
- Adventure Time: Marshall Lee Spectacular (2017)
- Steven Universe (2018)

== Discography ==
=== The Ashes ===
Albums

- Photoplay Music (2010)
- Sing! (2011)
- Play The Songs Of Vic Ruggiero (2012)

Appearing on

- Our First Compilation (2011)
- A Very Merry Christmas Compilation (2012)

=== The Old Glorys ===
EPs

- New Brunswick Demos (2011)

=== Shane-Michael Vidaurri ===
Albums

- The Cat Man is Sad (2015)
- The Cat Man Returns (2017)
- The Cat Man Is On His Own Again (2018)

Appearing on

- Our First Compilation (2011)
- Patchwork (2014)
- Transformed: A Tribute to Lou Reed (2014)
- NJ / NY Mixtape (2018)
- Mister Tom: Smell My Feet (2019)
