= Re-introducing the RocknRoll Hi-Fives =

Studio album by Rock N Roll Hi Fives
- Released: June 29, 2018
- Recorded: 2016–2017
- Genres: Rock and roll, indie rock
- Length: 35:40
- Label: Little Dickman Records

Rock N Roll Hi Fives chronology
The Beat the Sound the Dragon's Roar (2016)	Re-introducing the RocknRoll Hi-Fives (2018)

Re-introducing the RocknRoll Hi-Fives is the debut studio album from the American rock band Rock N Roll Hi Fives.

== Content ==
The ten-track album was released on red 12"-vinyl and digital download with Little Dickman Records, on 29 June 2018. It was recorded between 2016 and 2017, engineered by Mike Moebius and mastered by Joe Lambert. Re-introducing the RocknRoll Hi-Fives contains four new songs, with the remainder appearing on previous Rock N Roll Hi Fives' albums. They wrote the song "Hold On" in a 70s glam rock style, and Eilee Centeno recalls upon receiving the music, she was in "a rut with words and dad jokingly said I should start writing songs about relationships since that's what all of the hits were about. I've never been in a relationship before and I usually write the lyrics to our songs on my own but for this song dad and I wrote the lyrics together so we had both angles being portrayed in the song." The album draws comparison to the music of Kim Deal, Corin Tucker, and the Runaways.

The music video for "Same Mistakes" was released on September 18, 2018, and features live footage from their 2018 tour of Japan, with filming by Tsuyoshi Hashimoto. It also contains "various and sundry clips," and photographs. The record release party for Re-introducing the RocknRoll Hi-Fives was at Mercury Lounge in New York on June 24, 2018, with Lost Boy?.

== Reception ==
Rich Quinlan of Jersey Beat says Re-introducing the RocknRoll Hi-Fives is "fun and incredibly infectious, the Rock N Roll Hi-Fives inject a sense of purity into their playing that is desperately missed by most bands today. There is no pretense or tricks; this is rock 'n' roll for people who love rock 'n' roll." Bob Makin in Institute for Nonprofit News calls the song "Battles" the "standout," describing it as "a grungy grabber that's a cross between the Ramones and the Runaways with a pinch of L7 and Hole. I love the way Eilee simultaneously counters and complements the rough edges of this song with the distorted, sci-fi-sounding effects of the theremin." Magnet calls the song "C'est la Vie" a "hell of a good song."

A review of the song "Hold On" by Impose describe it as "a hooky, riff-chugging ripper straight out of the best anthemic works 60s glam has to offer with The RocknRoll Hi-Fives' unique flair and swagger shining throughout." The Fire Note says "Eilee's vocals are strong [on "Hold On" and] have a snap to them like Joan Jett," and the music is reminiscent "of 90's punk group Red Aunts or more currently Southern California's the Side Eyes."

== Tracklisting ==
No.	Title	Length
1.	"Same Mistakes"	3:14
2.	"Hold On"	3:29
3.	"C'est la Vie"	3:26
4.	"El Sueno"	3:40
5.	"You Got Me (Tongue Tied)"	4:31
6.	"Battles"	3:30
7.	"Livin' the Lost Boy Life"	3:58
8.	"TKO"	2:38
9.	"Glass Towns"	3:07
10.	"Running Nowhere"	4:07
Total length:		35:40

== Personnel ==
- Eilee Centeno – vocals and theremin
- Evren Centeno – drums
- Gloree Centeno – bass
- Joe Centeno – guitars and backing vocals
