= Make It Happen (EP) =

Make it Happen

EP by Rock N Roll Hi Fives
- Released: 15 September 2014
- Recorded: 2013–2014
- Studio: Moonlight Mile Recordings, Jersey City, New Jersey
- Genre: Rock and roll, indie rock
- Length: 22:23
- Label: Self-released
- Producer: Mike Moebius

Rock N Roll Hi Fives chronology
Make it Happen (2014)	Gold Glitter Shoes (2015)

Make it Happen is the debut studio EP from the American rock band Rock N Roll Hi Fives.

== Content ==
The six-track EP was self-released as a digital download, on 15 September 2014. The EP was written between 2013 and 2014. It was engineered, recorded and mixed by Mike Moebius at Moonlight Mile Recordings in Jersey City and mastered by Joe Lambert in Brooklyn.

== Reception ==
Tris McCall describes Make it Happen as "major-chord punk, catchy singalong choruses that arrive punctually." Jim Appio of CoolDad Music praised the album's themes and composition, describing it as "a really good indie pop record that draws on influences from the 1960s to classic indie/alt rock".

== Tracklisting ==
No.	Title	Length
1.	"Good with the Bad"	3:34
2.	"Come Around"	3:45
3.	"I'm not you're Girlfriend"	3:53
4.	"Lost and Found"	3:52
5.	"Get Up!"	3:43
6.	"Make it Happen"	3:30
Total length:		22:23

== Personnel ==
- Eilee Centeno – vocals
- Evren Centeno – drums
- Gloree Centeno – bass
- Joe Centeno – guitars and backing vocals
