= From scratch =

From scratch may refer to:

== Radio and television ==
- From Scratch (radio), an American National Public Radio series about "the entrepreneurial life"
- From Scratch (TV series), a 2022 Netflix original series
- "From Scratch", a 2006 episode of Curious George

== Music ==
- From Scratch (music group), a New Zealand experimental music group
- From Scratch (album), by Cyclone Static, 2019

== See also ==
- Scratch Messiah, participatory performances of Handel's Messiah
- Scratch (disambiguation)
- Scratch building, creation, from raw materials, of architectural scale model
