= Notepad (disambiguation) =

A notepad is a pad of paper for writing down notes.

Notepad may also refer to:

- Windows Notepad, a plain text editor included with Microsoft Windows
- Text editor, a type of software also known as "notepad"
- Notepad+, a freeware text editor for Windows developed in 1996
- Notepad++, a text editor for Windows developed in 2003

== See also ==
- Notebook (disambiguation)
- Scratchpad (disambiguation)
