= Scratch =

Scratch or scratching may refer to:

== Science and technology ==
- Scratch (programming language), an educational animation programming language developed by the MIT Media Lab
- Scratch space, space on the hard disk drive that is dedicated for only temporary storage
- Scratching, a technique used in recrystallization
- Scratch reflex, a response to activation of sensory neurons
- "Scratches", a synonym for mud fever, an infection occurring in horses

== Arts, entertainment, and media ==
=== Fictional characters ===
- Scratch (robot), in the TV show Adventures of Sonic the Hedgehog
- Scratch, from the Gobots series
- Scratch, a skid-steer digger in Bob the Builder
- Scratch (The Ghost and Molly McGee), the titular ghost in the animated television series The Ghost and Molly McGee
- Scratch, a brown alpaca in the children's television series, Nuzzle and Scratch

=== Films ===
- Scratch (2001 film), a documentary film about disc jockeys and hip-hop culture
- Scratch (2008 film), a Polish drama film
- Scratch (2010 film), a short film produced by Breakthru Films
- Scratch (2015 film), a Canadian musical drama film

=== Music ===
==== Concepts ====
- Scratch, a technique of playing dampened guitar strings
- Scratching, moving a vinyl record back and forth on a turntable
- A participatory public performance such as Scratch Messiah
- Scratch band, a band that plays fungi music

==== Groups and musicians ====
- Scratch (musician), American hip-hop artist
- Lee "Scratch" Perry (1936-2021), Jamaican reggae and dub artist
- Scratch Orchestra, an English experimental musical ensemble
- The Scratch (band), Irish band

==== Albums ====
- Scratch (Kenny Barron album), 1985
- Scratch (Kaela Kimura album), 2000
- Scratch (soundtrack), the soundtrack to the 2001 documentary Scratch
- Scratch, 1974 live album by The Crusaders
- Peter Gabriel (1978 album), a self-titled album also referred to as Scratch

==== Songs ====
- "Scratch", by Crash Crew from the album The Crash Crew
- "Scratch", by Morphine from the album Yes
- "Scratch", by The Surfaris from the album Hit City '64

=== Visual art ===
- Scratchboard, a visual arts medium
- Scratching, a technique or variation of graffiti (street art)

=== Other uses in arts, entertainment, and media ===
- Scratch (magazine), a hip-hop magazine
- Scratch Radio, a community radio station in Birmingham, England
- Scratches (video game), a horror adventure game released in 2006

== Sports ==
- Scratch (horse), a French Thoroughbred racehorse
- Scratch, in horse racing, the removal of a horse from a race before it is run
- Scratch, in pocket billiards games, the pocketing of the cue ball
- Scratch golfer, a golfer with a handicap of zero
- Scratch race, a track cycling race in which all riders start together
- Scratch track (disambiguation), several meanings

== Other uses ==
- Scratch, a small amount of extra money
- Old Scratch or Mr Scratch, a figure representing the devil
- Scratch building, creation, from raw materials, of architectural scale models
- Scratchcard (or scratch card, or scratcher), a small card with one or more areas containing concealed information which can be revealed by scratching off an opaque covering
- Scratchings, a snack made from pork rind
- Scratchpad (disambiguation)

== See also ==
- From scratch (disambiguation)
- Scratchy (disambiguation)
- Sgraffito, an artistic technique close to graffiti
