= List of compositions by Hubert Parry =

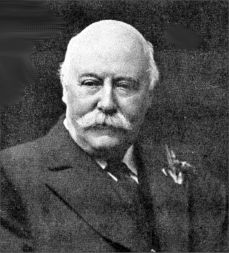
Hubert Parry c. 1916

This is a list of compositions by Hubert Parry (1848–1918). Dates of composition are indicated by "c.", and of publication by "p."

== Opera ==
- Guinevere (libretto by Una Taylor), c. 1885–86

== Incidental music ==
- The Birds (Aristophanes), c. 1883?, p. 1880?
- The Frogs (Aristophanes), c. 1891, p. 1892
- Hypatia (Stuart Ogilvie), c. for production Jan. 1893
- A Repentance (Teresa Craigie), c. for production Feb. 1899
- Agamemnon (Aeschylus), c. for production Feb. 1900, p. 1900
- The Clouds (Aristophanes), c. for production 1905, p. 1905
- Proserpine (Keats), c. 1912
- The Acharnians (Aristophanes), c. 1914, p. 1914

== Choral ==
=== Church music ===
- Anthem "Blessed is He", c. 1864, p. 1865
- Te Deum and Benedictus in D ma, c. 1866–68, p. 1868
- Morning, Evening and Communion Service (fragment), c. 1868, p, 1869
- Anthem for chorus & orchestra, "Hear my words, ye people", c. 1894, p. 1894
- Magnificat in F major for soprano, chorus & orchestra, c. 1897, p. 1897
- Te Deum in F major for soprano, bass, chorus & orchestra (Latin words), c. 1900, p. 1900; (English words) p. 1903
- Hymn, "God of all created things", p. 1902
- Anthem "I was glad" and processional music for Edward VII's coronation, c. 1902, p. 1903
- Motet "Voces clamantium H" for soprano, bass, chorus & orchestra, c. 1903, p. 1903
- Hymn "Crossing the bar" (Tennyson), p. 1903
- Hymn-tune "Through the night of doubt and sorrow", p. 1904
- Motet "Beyond these voices there is peace" for soprano, bass, chorus & orchestra, c. 1908, p. 1908
- Hymn-tune "O Sylvan Prophet" (Dryden), p. 1910
- Te Deum in D major for chorus & orch, c. 1911, p. 1911
- Psalm 46, "God is our hope" for bass, double chorus
- "Great Service" in D Major, c. 1881, p.1984 (ed. Jeremy Dibble)

=== Choral works (with orchestra) ===
- Oratorio "O Lord, Thou hast cast us out" (Exercise for B.Mus., Oxon.), c. 1865, p. 1876
- Scenes from Shelley's "Prometheus Unbound" for contr., tenor, bass, chorus & orchestra, p. 1880
- Ode from Shirley's "The Contention of Ajax and Ulysses", "The glories of our blood and state" for chorus & orchestra, c. 1883, p. 1885; revised 1914
- Ode at a Solemn Music "Blest pair of sirens" (Milton) for chorus and orchestra, p. 1887
- Oratorio "Judith" for solo voices, chorus & orchestra, p. 1888
- "Ode on St. Cecilia's Day" (Pope) for soprano, bass, chorus & orchestra p. 1889
- "L'Allegro ed il Penseroso" (Milton) for soprano, bass, chorus & orchestra p. 1890
- Ode "Eton" (Swinburne) for chorus & orchestra c. 1891, p. 1891
- "De Profundis" for soprano, 12-part chorus & orchestra p. 1891
- Choric Song from Tennyson's "Lotus Eaters" for soprano, chorus & orchestra p. 1892
- Oratorio "Job" for solo voices, chorus & orchestra p. 1892
- Oratorio "King Saul" for solo voices, chorus & orchestra p. 1894
- "Invocation to Music" (Bridges) for soprano, tenor, bass, chorus & orchestra p. 1895
- "A Song of Darkness and Light" (Bridges) for soprano, chorus & orchestra p. 1898
- "Ode to Music" (A. C. Benson) for soprano, tenor, bass, chorus & orchestra p. 1901
- Symphonic Ode "War and Peace" (A. Benson & Parry) for solo voices, chorus & orchestra p. 1903
- "Sinfonia sacra", "Love that casteth out fear" for chorus & orchestra p. 1904
- "The Pied Piper of Hamelin" (Browning) for tenor, bass, chorus & orchestra p. 1905
- "Sinfonia sacra", "The Soul's Ransom" for soprano, bass, chorus & orchestra p. 1906
- Symphonic poem, "A Vision of Life" for soprano, bass, chorus & orchestra p. 1907; revised 1914
- "Eton Memorial Ode" (Bridges) for chorus & orchestra p. 1908
- "Ode on the Nativity" (Dunbar) for soprano, chorus & orchestra p. 1912
- Naval Ode "The Chivalry of the Sea" (Bridges) for chorus & orchestra p. 1916

=== Choral works (unaccompanied) ===
- Madrigal "Fair daffodils" (5 parts) (Herrick), c. 1866, p. 1866
- Christmas Carol "He is coming" (Mrs. H. Gladstone) p. 1874
- Three Trios for female voices, p. 1875
- Unison Song "Land to the Leeward Ho!" (Margaret Preston), p. 1895
- Partsongs, p. 1897
- Eight Four-part Songs, p. 1898
- Five-part Song, "Who can dwell with greatness" (Austin Dobson), p. 1900
- "Ode to Newfoundland" (Sir Cavendish Boyle), national anthem of the Dominion of Newfoundland and now the provincial anthem of Newfoundland and Labrador, c. 1902–04
- Four-part and eight-part Song, "In Praise of Song" (Parry), p. 1904
- "Von edler Art" (Nuremberg Song-book of 1549, trans. by Paul England), p. 1906
- Seven Partsongs for male voices p. 1910
- Madrigal "La Belle Dame sans merci" (5 parts) (Keats), p, c. 1914
- Carol "When Christ was born" (Harleian MS), p. 1915
- Choral song "And did those feet in ancient time" ("Jerusalem") (Blake), p. 1916
- Six Motets, Songs of Farewell p. 1916–1918 [1. My soul, there is a country (SATB) / words by Henry Vaughan. 2. I know my soul hath power (SATB) / words by John Davies. 3. Never weather-beaten sail (SSATB) / words by Thomas Campion. 4. There is an old belief (SSATBB) / words by John Gibson Lockhart. 5. At the round earth's imagined corners (SSAATTBB) / words by John Donne. 6. Lord, let me know mine end (SATB/SATB) / words from Psalm 39]
- Two Carols, p. 1917
- Three School Songs, p. 1918
- Unison Song "England", p. 1919

== Orchestral works ==
- "Allegretto scherzando" in E major c. 1867
- "Intermezzo religioso" c. 1868
- Overture, "Vivien" (lost), c. 1873
- Overture, Guillem de Cabestanh, c. 1878–79
- Piano Concerto in F♯ c. 1878–79
- Symphony No. 1 in G major c. 1878–82
- Symphony No. 2 in F major ("Cambridge"), c. 1883, p. 1900
- "Suite moderne" c. 1886
- Symphony No. 3 in C major ("English"), c. 1889, p. 1907
- Symphony No. 4 in E minor c. 1889, p. 1921
- "Overture to an Unwritten Tragedy" c. 1893, p. 1893
- "Lady Radnor's Suite" for strings c. 1894, p. 1902
- Elegy for Brahms, A minor p. 1897
- Symphonic Variations, c. 1897, p. 1897
- Symphony Fantasy (Symphony No. 5) in B minor "1912" c. 1912, p. 1922
- Symphonic Poem in 2 connected movements (first called "From Death to Life"), c. 1914
- "An English Suite" for strings (posthumous), p. 1921

== Voice and orchestra ==
- Scena for baritone, "The Soldier's Tent", c. 1900, p. 1900

== Chamber music ==
- String Quartet No. 1, in G minor c. 1867
- Short Trios for violin, viola & pianoforte c. 1868
- String Quartet No. 2, in C minor c. 1868
- Nonet in B♭ major for wind instruments, c. 1877 p. 1988
- Trio in E minor for violin, cello & pianoforte c. 1878, p. 1879
- Quartet in A♭ major for violin, viola, cello & pianoforte c. 1879, p. 1884
- String Quartet No. 3, in G major c. 1878–80 p. 1995
- String Quintet in E♭ major c. 1884, p. 1909
- Trio in B minor for violin, cello & pianoforte p. 1884
- Trio in G major for violin, cello & pianoforte c. 1884–90

== Violin and piano ==
- Partita in D minor c. 1877–86, p. 1890
- Fantasy-Sonata in B minor c. 1878
- Sonata in D major, 1889
- Twelve Short Pieces p. 1895
- Suite in D major p. 1907
- Suite in F major p. 1907

== Violoncello and piano ==
- Sonata in A major p. 1883

== Keyboard ==
=== Piano solo ===
- "Sonnets and Songs without Words", Set I, p. 1869
- "Sonnets and Songs without Words", Set II c. 1867 and later, p. 1875
- Seven "Charakterbilder" c. 1872, p. 1872
- Sonata No. 1, in F major c. 1877, p. 1877
- "Sonnets and Songs without Words", Set III c. 1877 and later
- Sonata No. 2, in A major p. 1878
- Theme and 19 Variations in D minor c. 1878–85, p. 1885
- "Shulbrede Tunes", 10 Pieces, p. 1914
- Suite "Hands across the Centuries" p. 1918
- Five Miniatures (posthumous), p. 1926

=== Piano duet ===
- Characteristic Popular Tunes of the British Isles, c. 1885, p. 1887

=== Two pianos ===
- Grand Duo in E minor c. 1875–76, p. 1877

=== Organ ===
- Seven Chorale Preludes, p. 1912
- Fantasia and Fugue in G, p. 1913
- Elegy in A♭ major c. 1913, p. 1922
- Three Chorale Fantasies, p. 1915
- Seven Chorale Preludes, p. 1916
- Toccata and Fugue in G major and E minor, "The Wanderer" (posthumous), p. 1921
- Elegie in C. (1918), p. 2018

== Songs ==
- "Why does azure deck the sky?" (Thomas Moore), c. 1865–66, p. 1866
- "Autumn" (Thomas Hood), c. ? 1866, p. 1867
- "Angel hosts, sweet love, befriend thee" (Lord Francis Hervey), p. 1867
- "The River of Life" (Lord Pembroke), p. 1870
- Three Songs, c. 1873, p. 1873
- "Twilight" (Lord Pembroke), c. 1874, p. 1875
- "A Garland of Old-fashioned Songs", c. 1873–81, p. 1874 & 1881
- Four Sonnets (Shakespeare), c. 1873–82, p. 1887
- Sonnet, "If thou survive my well-contented day" (Shakespeare), c. 1874
- 3 Odes of Anacreon (trans. Moore), c. 1869–78, p. 1880
- "English Lyrics", Set I, c. 1881–85
- "English Lyrics", Set II (Shakespeare), p. 1886
- "The Maid of Elsinore" (Harold Boulton), p. 1891
- Children's song, "Rock a bye", c. 1893, p. 1893
- "English Lyrics", Set III, p. 1895
- "English Lyrics", Set IV, p. 1897
- "English Lyrics", Set V, p. 1902
- "English Lyrics", Set VI, p. 1902
- "Fear no more the heat of the sun" (Shakespeare), p. 1905
- "English Lyrics", Set VII, p. 1907
- "English Lyrics", Set VIII, p. 1907
- "The Laird of Cockpen" (Lady Nairn) for baritone, c. 1906, p. 1907
- "English Lyrics", Set IX (Mary Coleridge), p. 1909
- "A Hymn for Aviators" (Mary C. D. Hamilton), c. 1915, p. 1915
- "English Lyrics", Set X, c. 1909, p. 1918
- "English Lyrics", Set XI, p. 1920 (posthumously)
- "English Lyrics", Set XII, p. 1920 (posthumously)
