= String Quartet in G major =

String Quartet in G major may refer to:

- No. 4 of the String Quartets, Op. 64 (Haydn)
- No. 1 of the String Quartets, Op. 76 (Haydn)
- String Quartet No. 1 (Mozart)
- String Quartet No. 3 (Mozart)
- String Quartet No. 14 (Mozart)
- String Quartet No. 2 (Beethoven)
- String Quartet No. 15 (Schubert)
- String Quartet No. 13 (Dvořák)
- String Quartet No. 3 (Parry)
- String Quartet No. 6 (Hill)
- String Quartet No. 2 (Enescu)
- String Quartet No. 6 (Shostakovich)
- String Quartet No. 3 (Britten)
