= Six Motets =

Six Motets may refer to:

- Six Motets, Op. 82 (Kiel)
- Six Motets, Songs of Farewell, a composition by Hubert Parry
