= From Scratch (album) =

Studio album by Cyclone Static
- Released: February 8, 2019
- Studio: The Forest of Chaos
- Genres: Punk rock, garage rock
- Length: 38:05
- Label: Mint 400 Records
- Producer: Neil Sabatino

From Scratch is the debut studio album from the American rock band Cyclone Static.

== Content ==
The ten-track album was released with Mint 400 Records, on February 8, 2019. It was also released on compact disc and on vinyl. From Scratch was recorded and produced at the Forest of Chaos by Neil Sabatino, and mixed and mastered by Stuart Richardson at Rocky Water Studios. The psychedelic cover art was created by Orion Landau, of Relapse Records. The songwriting on From Scratch is compared to the punk rock band Hüsker Du, the alternative rock band the Pixies, and the grunge rock band Nirvana. The album is described as "melodious punk" with "bold hooks and instantly infectious melodies." James Salerno explains that the title-track is "a story about commitment, when you come to a point in a relationship when you will do anything for that other person."

"From Scratch" was released as a single on November 21, 2018, and the second single "Walk This Line" was released on December 18, 2018. The record release party was held at FM Bar & Lounge in Jersey City, on February 7, 2019, with a performance by Alpha Rabbit, and emo rock band Thursday's lead vocalist, Geoff Rickly as DJ. "Company Man" appears on the 2018 compilation album, NJ / NY Mixtape.

== Reception ==
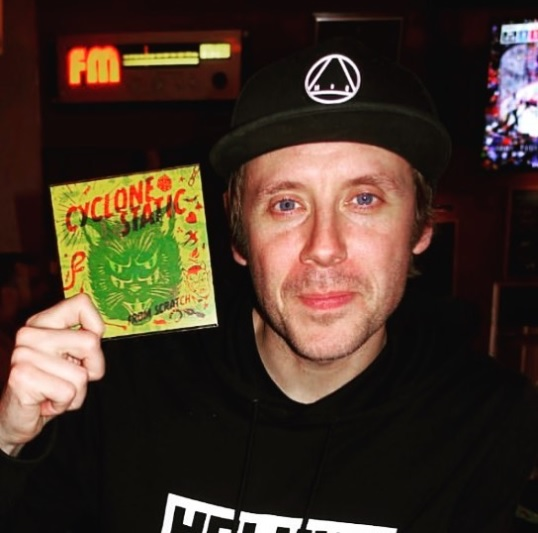
[From Scratch is] evocative of a simpler time. Not just to a time of punk rock on the radio but a whole lost New Jersey paradise: Asbury Park before the renaissance, radios cranking out surf guitars and sandy, beach-blown harmonies, through empty lots full of downed power lines and bombed-out buildings." – Geoff Rickly

A review by Bob Makin in New Jersey Stage says "the sharply polished stash of angst-filled pop opens with my favorite, "Walk This Line," which seems as if Kurt Cobain and Johnny Cash got really fucked up one night in Rock 'n' Roll Heaven and sent down this tough-sounding, yet intelligent tune to Cyclone Static." Jedd Beaudoin of PopMatters says "the punk energy is unrelenting across the ["From Scratch"]'s three-and-a-half minutes, a salvo of relentless punk attitude that bridges the gap between punk's rawest, early days and its culmination as a mainstream force in the 1990s. Along the way the outfit's dedication to DIY ethos remains unwavering. Florian Meissner from Soundblab says "From Scratch is a great record, and songs like "Walk This Line" or "Circles" will keep popping up in my playlist. If you're a fan of good, down-to-earth melodic punk rock, this is perfect for you."

Davey Havok calls the album "a fuzzed-out nod to the punk frays of an early '90s flannel rock outfit" and continues with "tasteful melodic hooks adding a bit of Brit pop sensibility, [Cyclone Static] bring gritty authenticity to driving rock n roll." In Jersey Beat, James Damion names "Runaway" and "Sacred Island" as his favorites, saying Cyclone Statics's "gritty guitar rock sound, sneering vocals and the devious rhythms featured on From Scratch had me longing for the dirty clubs and basements I frequented back east." Jim Testa writes "From Scratch's ten tracks bring the kind of ageless energy that you might expect from the Descendents, from the exhuberant [sic] title track to the Teen Spirit smell that's been smeared all over "Company Man."" He ends his review with "don't write these mooks off. They are coming for your children's ears (and souls.)"

== Track listing ==
No.	Title	Length
1.	"Walk This Line"	3:22
2.	"From Scratch"	3:49
3.	"Runaway"	2:42
4.	"Company Man"	3:45
5.	"Everlasting Glow"	3:44
6.	"Circles"	3:09
7.	"Sacred Island"	4:34
8.	"Ordinary Days"	4:28
9.	"Too Many Roads"	5:05
10.	"Unstoppable"	3:17
Total length:		38:05

== Personnel ==
- Jonathan LeVine – drums
- Danny Patierno – bass
- James Salerno – vocals and guitar
