= Scratchy =

Scratchy may refer to:

- Scratchy, a cartoon cat on The Itchy & Scratchy Show, a show within The Simpsons
- Scratchy: The Complete Reprise Recordings, an album by Crazy Horse
- Scratchy & Co., a British children's television series
- Scratchy Bottom, a valley in England
- Scratchy (MC), member of the British grime group Roll Deep

== See also ==
- Scratch
