= Scratch track =

Scratch track may refer to:

- Scratch track race or scratch race, a track cycling discipline in which all riders start together
- Scratch track (studio recording), a preliminary recording made during the process of studio recording

== See also ==
- Scratch (disambiguation)
