= Foundling Hospital Anthem =

1749 choral anthem by G F Handel

- by George Frideric Handel
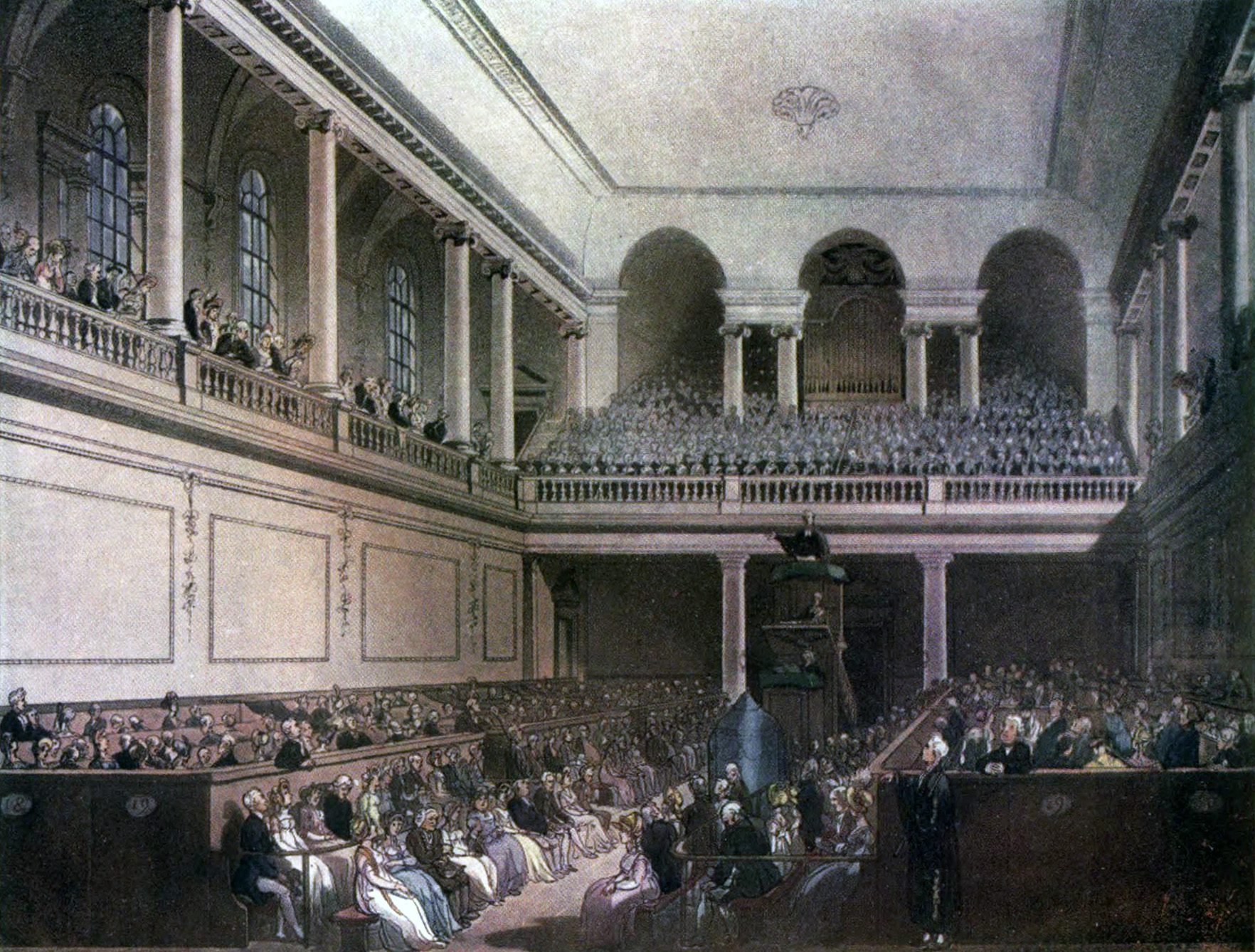
- The Foundling Hospital Chapel, venue of Handel's premiere
- Full title: Blessed are they that considereth the poor
- Catalogue: HWV 268
- Period: Baroque
- Genre: Choral anthem
- Text: adapted from the King James Bible
- Language: English
- Movements: 4

Premiere
- Date: 27 May 1749
- Location: The Foundling Hospital Chapel, Bloomsbury, London
- Conductor: George Frideric Handel
- Performers: Children of the Chapel Royal

The Foundling Hospital Anthem (HWV 268), also known by its longer title "Blessed are they that considereth the poor" [sic], (Note: Although the correct conjugation should be "Blessed are they that consider the poor", Burrows notes that Handel apparently disregarded grammar, adding the -eth ending, as he also did in the Peace Anthem: "How beautiful are the feet of them that bringeth…") is a choral anthem composed by George Frideric Handel in 1749. It was written for the Foundling Hospital in London and was first performed in the chapel there. Handel wrote two versions, one for choir only and one for choir and soloists. Composed 10 years before his death, it was Handel's last piece of English church music.

== Background ==
The Foundling Hospital was a charitable institution founded in 1739 by the philanthropic sea captain Thomas Coram to house and educate abandoned and orphaned children. It was established under royal charter by King George II and was supported by many noted figures of the day in high society and the arts. The portrait painter and cartoonist William Hogarth was a founding governor, and thanks to his influence, the Foundling Hospital grew to become a very fashionable charity, counting among its benefactors a number of renowned artists. Under Hogarth's direction, artists such as William Hogarth, Joshua Reynolds, Allan Ramsay and Thomas Gainsborough exhibited paintings at the Hospital, creating what is thought to be Britain's first public art gallery. The composer George Frederic Handel was invited to put on a benefit concert in the Hospital chapel to raise funds, and for the occasion he composed the Foundling Hospital Anthem.

== First performance ==
The premiere of the Foundling Hospital Anthem took place at a midday concert in the Hospital Chapel on 27 May 1749. The Chapel was not finished, and had no glass in the windows. The performance was attended by the Prince and Princess of Wales. The programme opened with Handel's Anthem for the Peace (written in 1749 in thanksgiving for the Peace of Aix-la-Chapelle); this was followed by a selection of extracts from his oratorio Solomon (1748); and followed by Foundling Hospital Anthem, billed as "The Anthem Composed on this Occasion". The anthem concluded with the "Hallelujah" chorus from Messiah, a piece that had not yet gained widespread popularity at the time. It is possible that it was at this performance that royalty first stood for the "Hallelujah" chorus, establishing a long tradition, rather than at the 1743 London premiere of Messiah attended by King George II, as is popularly assumed. The concert was a huge success for both Handel and the Hospital.

Handel's fundraising concert began a long association with the Foundling Hospital in Bloomsbury. He later donated a pipe organ for the new chapel. In 1750, he conducted a second benefit concert in the chapel; this was a performance of Messiah, and it was so oversubscribed that Handel had to put on a repeat performance two weeks later. The Foundling Hospital expressed its gratitude by making Handel a governor of the charity. A tradition was established of an annual Easter performance of Messiah in the Hospital Chapel, and this established the piece's enormous popularity among British audiences. Handel attended every performance until his death in 1759. A memorial concert was held in Handel's honour in the Hospital Chapel soon after his death, during which the Foundling Hospital Anthem was performed once more.

== Composition ==
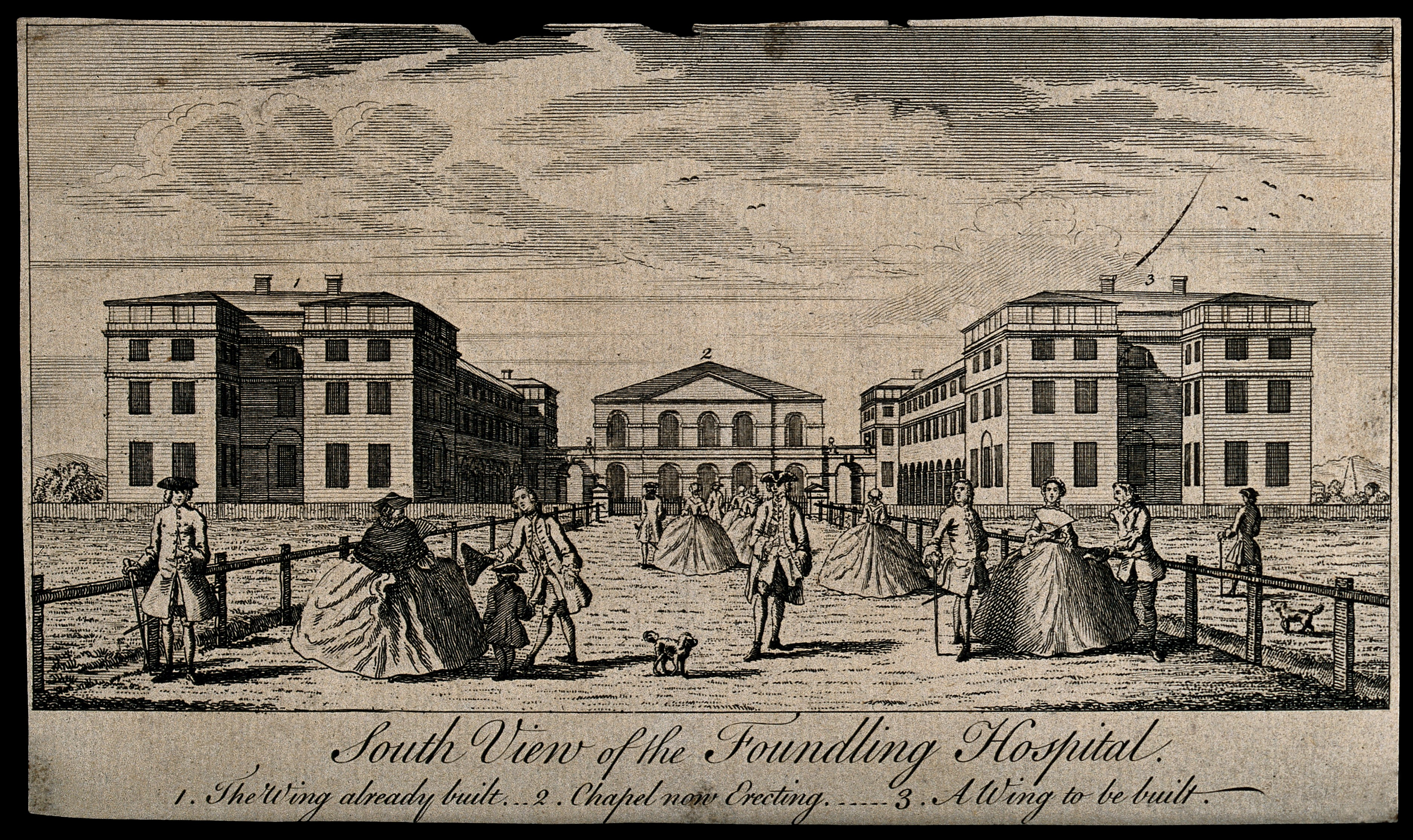
Engraving of the Foundling Hospital (c.1750), showing the Chapel (centre) "now erecting"

"Hallelujah", the concluding chorus of the Foundling Hospital Anthem

The Foundling Hospital Anthem is compiled from material originating in other works by Handel, including two movements from the Funeral Anthem for Queen Caroline (1737), a sombre chorus that had been edited out of Susanna (1748), and most notably, the "Hallelujah" chorus from Messiah, which concludes the anthem.

Handel's first version, written for the first performance at the fundraising concert in May 1749, was a fully choral score. He wrote a second version, probably arranged in 1751 for a service of dedication at the official opening of the Foundling Hospital Chapel. The Foundling Hospital's own charity children did not sing in these performances, but instead the choir was formed from the Children of the Chapel Royal. At the performance of the revised score, the soloists were John Beard (tenor), Gaetano Guadagni (castrato), and two boy trebles from the Chapel Royal.

It is not known why Handel chose to conclude this work with the "Hallelujah" chorus; the subject matter of the anthem is concerned with reward for the charitable, and Handel he may have intended to draw a theological connection with "the Kingdom of this world" becoming "the kingdom of our Lord", as illustrated in Christ's Parable of The Sheep and the Goats (Matthew 25:31–46). Equally, Handel may simply have wanted a rousing conclusion to the anthem.

=== Text ===
The anthem opens with text adapted from Psalm 41 and the Book of Job (Psalm 41 and Job 29:11). The famous "Hallelujah" chorus is derived from the Book of Revelation (Revelation 19:6 and Revelation 11:15).

Blessed are they that considereth the poor and needy:
the Lord will deliver them in time of trouble,
the Lord preserve them and comfort them.
They deliver the poor that crieth, the fatherless
and him that hath none to help him.
The Lord will comfort them.
O God, who from the suckling’s mouth
ordaineth early praise,
of such as worship Thee in truth
accept the humble lays.

The charitables shall be had in everlasting remembrance
and the good will shine as the brightness of the firmament.

Comfort them, O Lord, when they are sick:
make thou their bed in sickness.
Keep them alive, let them be blessed upon the earth
and not deliver them unto their foes.

Hallelujah!
The Kingdom of this world
is become the kingdom of our Lord
and of His Christ,
and He shall reign forever and ever.
Hallelujah!

== Legacy ==
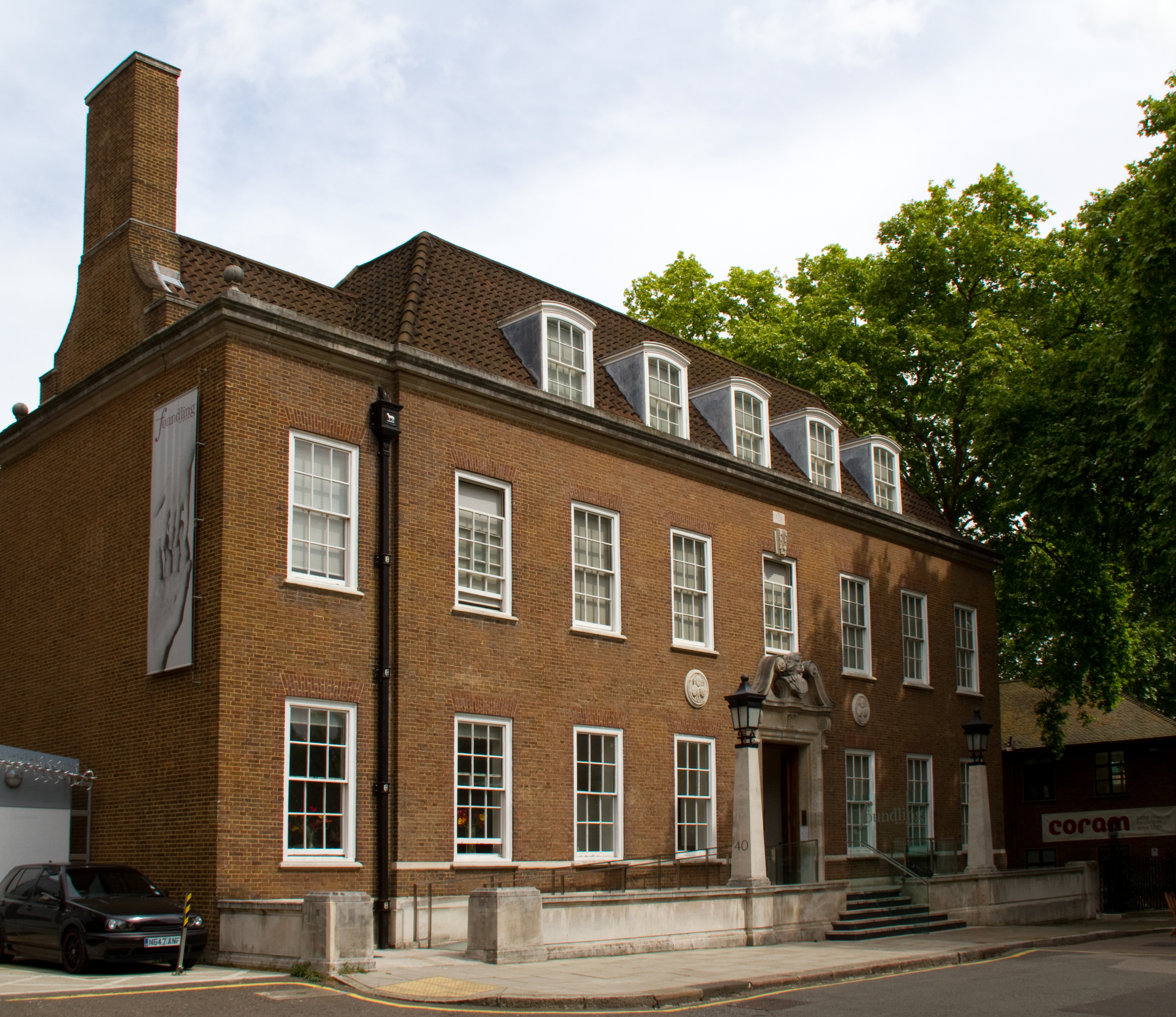
Handel's score is displayed at the Foundling Museum.

Handel's fundraising concerts of both the Foundling Hospital Anthem and Messiah were highly successful, raising almost £7000 (equivalent to over £1 million in modern money) and his contribution is remembered today. The Foundling Hospital relocated in 1935, moving to a new building in Berkhamsted, Hertfordshire and the Bloomsbury building, including the chapel, was demolished. On the site today is a children's park, Coram's Fields. The Hospital eventually closed in 1955, and the Berkhamsted building converted into a secondary school, Ashlyns School.

The Foundling Hospital charity once supported by Handel continues to this day as the Thomas Coram Foundation for Children (now known simply as Coram). The musical scores of the Foundling Hospital Anthem and Messiah donated by Handel to the Hospital are now on display at the Foundling Museum in London. Handel's Anthem is performed at an annual concert to mark the composer's birthday in February.

The charitable origins of Messiah are continued in today's "Scratch Messiah" performances, when concert performances are staged with public participation in the choruses. These concerts are often charity fundraising events and are a tradition of Christmas music in Britain and America that dates back to the 1820s.

== Sources ==
- Burrows, Donald (1991). "1743–1759: Covent Garden and the Foundling Hospital". Handel: Messiah. Cambridge University Press. ISBN 978-0-521-37620-4.
- Burrows, Donald (2005). Handel and the English Chapel Royal. Oxford University Press. ISBN 978-0-19-816228-5.
- Burrows, Donald (2012). Handel. Oxford University Press, USA. ISBN 978-0-19-973736-9.
