= Psalm 40 =

Biblical psalm

- "I waited patiently for the LORD"
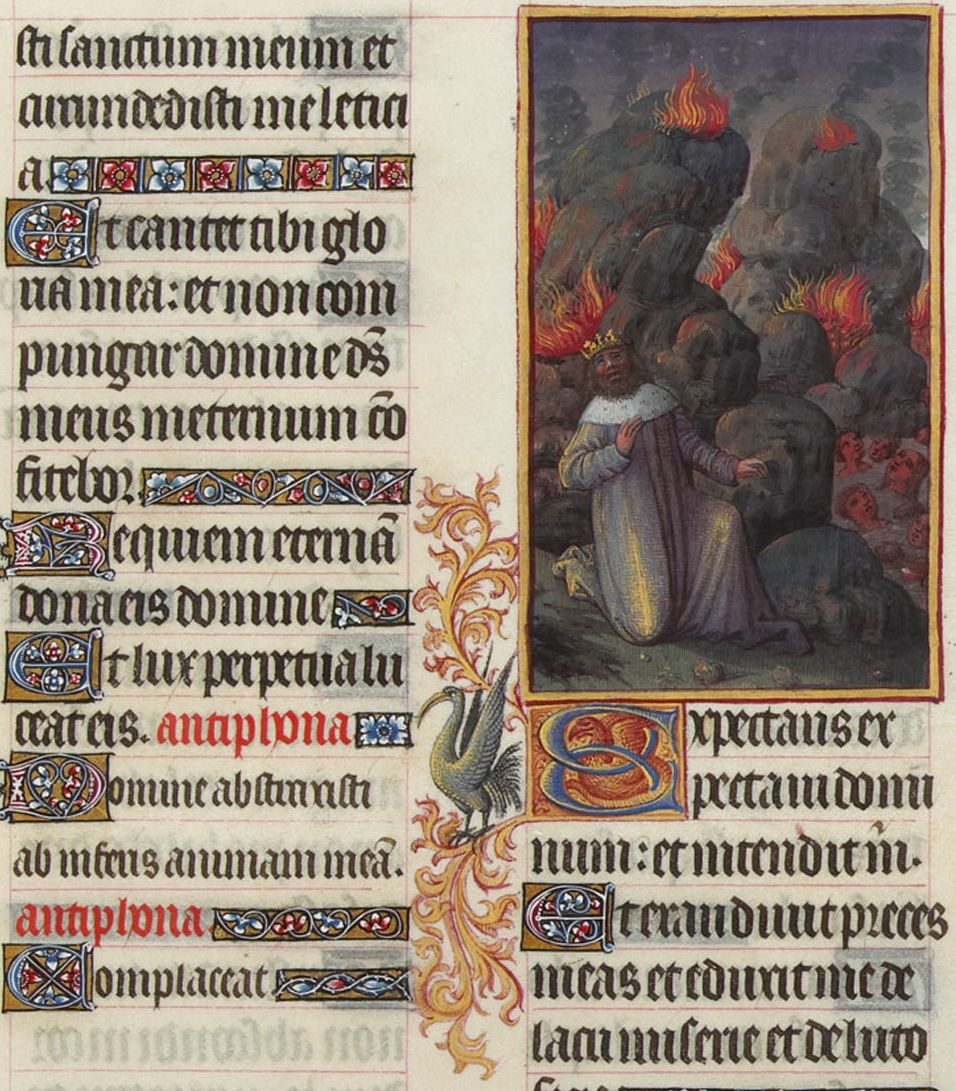
- Psalm 40 in Les Très Riches Heures du duc de Berry, Musée Condé, Chantilly
- Other name: Psalm 39; "Expectans expectavi Dominum"
- Text: attributed to King David
- Language: Hebrew (original)

Psalm 40
- ← Psalm 39 Psalm 41 →
- Book: Book of Psalms
- Hebrew Bible part: Ketuvim
- Order in the Hebrew part: 1
- Category: Sifrei Emet
- Christian Bible part: Old Testament
- Order in the Christian part: 19

Psalm 40 is the 40th psalm of the Book of Psalms, beginning in English in the King James Version: "I waited patiently for the LORD". The Book of Psalms is part of the third section of the Hebrew Bible, and a book of the Christian Old Testament. In the slightly different numbering system used in the Greek Septuagint and Latin Vulgate translations of the Bible, this psalm is Psalm 39. In Latin, it is known by the incipit, "Expectans expectavi Dominum". It is described by the Jerusalem Bible as a "song of praise and prayer for help".

Psalm 40 is used in both Jewish and Christian liturgies. It has been set to music, Baroque settings and U2's song "40" from their 1983 album, War. Two composers used the beginning for symphonic compositions, Mendelssohn's Lobgesang and Stravinsky's Symphony of Psalms.

== Structure ==
The first part of the Psalm (verses 1-11) is one in the series of psalms of thanksgiving of an individual. Verses 13-18, possibly set originally in an independent Psalm context, are virtually identical to Psalm 70. This part belongs more in the group of psalms of lament. Matthew Henry divides the psalm into three sections:

- Confidence for deliverance (verses 1-5)
- Christ's work of redemption (6-10)
- A prayer for mercy and grace (11-17).

== Interpretation ==
Some writers see verses 6-9 as prophetic of Jesus, or of the messiah generally.

John Wesley saw it as a prayer of salvation.

== Uses ==
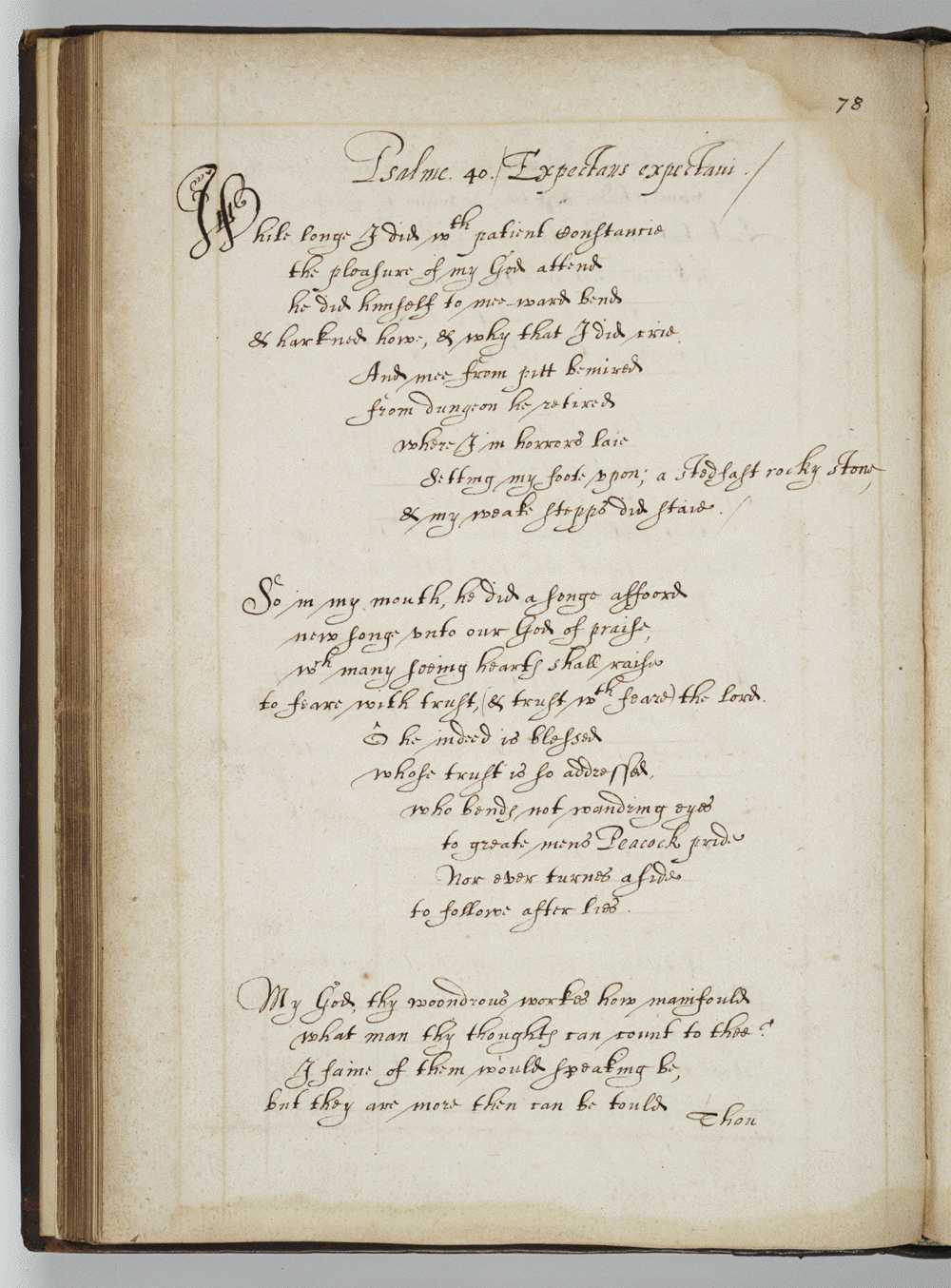
Psalm 40 manuscript from the Sidney Psalms (16th century), Trinity College Library MS R. 3. 16, p. 78

=== New Testament ===
Verses 6-8 are quoted in Hebrews 10:5–7.

This phrase "I delight to do your will" is also contrasted with the verse in the same Psalm where "They delight to do me harm". This adds to this imagery portending the plots against and betrayal of Jesus. The following Psalm 41 is also seen by the New Testament to portend the betrayal of Jesus by Judas.

=== Judaism ===
- Verse 2 is found in the repetition of the Amidah during Rosh Hashanah.
- Verse 12 is the second verse from V'hu Rachum in Pesukei Dezimra, and the long Tachanun recited on Mondays and Thursdays.

=== Book of Common Prayer ===
In the Church of England's Book of Common Prayer, this psalm is appointed to be read on the morning of the eighth day of the month, as well as at Matins on Good Friday.

=== Music ===
Heinrich Schütz wrote a setting of a paraphrase of Psalm 40 in German, "Ich harrete des Herren", SWV 137, for the Becker Psalter, published first in 1628. Mendelssohn used the beginning in German as the text for the fifth movement from his Lobgesang. The same verses in Latin form the text of the second movement of Stravinsky's Symphony of Psalms.

The Psalm was used in U2's song "40", the final track from their 1983 album, War.

A song by The Mountain Goats titled "Psalm 40:2" appears on their 2009 album The Life of the World to Come, inspired by this verse.

== Text ==
The following table shows the Hebrew text of the Psalm with vowels, alongside the Koine Greek text in the Septuagint and the English translation from the King James Version. Note that the meaning can slightly differ between these versions, as the Septuagint and the Masoretic Text come from different textual traditions. (Note: A 1917 translation directly from Hebrew to English by the Jewish Publication Society can be found here or here, and an 1844 translation directly from the Septuagint by L. C. L. Brenton can be found here. Both translations are in the public domain.) In the Septuagint, this psalm is numbered Psalm 39.

#	Hebrew	English	Greek
(Note: In the Jewish verse numbering, the ascription of this psalm is verse 1, and the rest of the psalm begins from verse 2. However, the Christian verse numbering does not count the ascription as a separate verse.)	לַ֝מְנַצֵּ֗חַ לְדָוִ֥ד מִזְמֽוֹר׃	(To the chief Musician, A Psalm of David.)	Εἰς τὸ τέλος· ψαλμὸς τῷ Δαυΐδ. -
1	קַוֺּ֣ה קִוִּ֣יתִי יְהֹוָ֑ה וַיֵּ֥ט אֵ֝לַ֗י וַיִּשְׁמַ֥ע שַׁוְעָתִֽי׃	I waited patiently for the LORD; and he inclined unto me, and heard my cry.	ΥΠΟΜΕΝΩΝ ὑπέμεινα τὸν Κύριον, καὶ προσέσχε μοι καὶ εἰσήκουσε τῆς δεήσεώς μου
2	וַיַּעֲלֵ֤נִי ׀ מִבּ֥וֹר שָׁאוֹן֮ מִטִּ֢יט הַיָּ֫וֵ֥ן וַיָּ֖קֶם עַל־סֶ֥לַע רַגְלַ֗י כּוֹנֵ֥ן אֲשֻׁרָֽי׃	He brought me up also out of an horrible pit, out of the miry clay, and set my feet upon a rock, and established my goings.	καὶ ἀνήγαγέ με ἐκ λάκκου ταλαιπωρίας καὶ ἀπὸ πηλοῦ ἰλύος καὶ ἔστησεν ἐπὶ πέτραν τοὺς πόδας μου καὶ κατηύθυνε τὰ διαβήματά μου
3	וַיִּתֵּ֬ן בְּפִ֨י ׀ שִׁ֥יר חָדָשׁ֮ תְּהִלָּ֢ה לֵאלֹ֫הֵ֥ינוּ יִרְא֣וּ רַבִּ֣ים וְיִירָ֑אוּ וְ֝יִבְטְח֗וּ בַּיהֹוָֽה׃	And he hath put a new song in my mouth, even praise unto our God: many shall see it, and fear, and shall trust in the LORD.	καὶ ἐνέβαλεν εἰς τὸ στόμα μου ᾆσμα καινόν, ὕμνον τῷ Θεῷ ἡμῶν· ὄψονται πολλοὶ καὶ φοβηθήσονται καὶ ἐλπιοῦσιν ἐπὶ Κύριον.
4	אַ֥שְֽׁרֵי הַגֶּ֗בֶר אֲשֶׁר־שָׂ֣ם יְ֭הֹוָה מִבְטַח֑וֹ וְֽלֹא־פָנָ֥ה אֶל־רְ֝הָבִ֗ים וְשָׂטֵ֥י כָזָֽב׃	Blessed is that man that maketh the LORD his trust, and respecteth not the proud, nor such as turn aside to lies.	μακάριος ἀνήρ, οὗ ἐστι τὸ ὄνομα Κυρίου ἐλπὶς αὐτοῦ, καὶ οὐκ ἐπέβλεψεν εἰς ματαιότητας καὶ μανίας ψευδεῖς.
5	רַבּ֤וֹת עָשִׂ֨יתָ ׀ אַתָּ֤ה ׀ יְהֹוָ֣ה אֱלֹהַי֮ נִ֥פְלְאֹתֶ֥יךָ וּמַחְשְׁבֹתֶ֗יךָ אֵ֫לֵ֥ינוּ אֵ֤ין ׀ עֲרֹ֬ךְ אֵלֶ֗יךָ אַגִּ֥ידָה וַאֲדַבֵּ֑רָה עָ֝צְמ֗וּ מִ סַּפֵּֽר׃	Many, O LORD my God, are thy wonderful works which thou hast done, and thy thoughts which are to us-ward: they cannot be reckoned up in order unto thee: if I would declare and speak of them, they are more than can be numbered.	πολλὰ ἐποίησας σύ, Κύριε ὁ Θεός μου, τὰ θαυμάσιά σου, καὶ τοῖς διαλογισμοῖς σου οὐκ ἔστι τίς ὁμοιωθήσεταί σοι· ἀπήγγειλα καὶ ἐλάλησα, ἐπληθύνθησαν ὑπὲρ ἀριθμόν.
6	זֶ֤בַח וּמִנְחָ֨ה ׀ לֹֽא־חָפַ֗צְתָּ אׇ֭זְנַיִם כָּרִ֣יתָ לִּ֑י עוֹלָ֥ה וַ֝חֲטָאָ֗ה לֹ֣א שָׁאָֽלְתָּ׃	Sacrifice and offering thou didst not desire; mine ears hast thou opened: burnt offering and sin offering hast thou not required.	θυσίαν καὶ προσφορὰν οὐκ ἠθέλησας, σῶμα δὲ κατηρτίσω μοι· ὁλοκαυτώματα καὶ περὶ ἁμαρτίας οὐκ ἐζήτησας.
7	אָ֣ז אָ֭מַרְתִּי הִנֵּה־בָ֑אתִי בִּמְגִלַּת־סֵ֝֗פֶר כָּת֥וּב עָלָֽי׃	Then said I, Lo, I come: in the volume of the book it is written of me,	τότε εἶπον· ἰδοὺ ἥκω, ἐν κεφαλίδι βιβλίου γέγραπται περὶ ἐμοῦ·
8	לַ֥עֲשׂוֹת־רְצוֹנְךָ֣ אֱלֹהַ֣י חָפָ֑צְתִּי וְ֝ת֥וֹרָתְךָ֗ בְּת֣וֹךְ מֵעָֽי׃	I delight to do thy will, O my God: yea, thy law is within my heart.	τοῦ ποιῆσαι τὸ θέλημά σου, ὁ Θεός μου, ἐβουλήθην καὶ τὸν νόμον σου ἐν μέσῳ τῆς κοιλίας μου.
9	בִּשַּׂ֤רְתִּי צֶ֨דֶק ׀ בְּקָ֘הָ֤ל רָ֗ב הִנֵּ֣ה שְׂ֭פָתַי לֹ֣א אֶכְלָ֑א יְ֝הֹוָ֗ה אַתָּ֥ה יָדָֽעְתָּ׃	I have preached righteousness in the great congregation: lo, I have not refrained my lips, O LORD, thou knowest.	εὐηγγελισάμην δικαιοσύνην ἐν ἐκκλησίᾳ μεγάλῃ· ἰδοὺ τὰ χείλη μου οὐ μὴ κωλύσω· Κύριε, σὺ ἔγνως.
10	צִדְקָתְךָ֬ לֹֽא־כִסִּ֨יתִי ׀ בְּת֬וֹךְ לִבִּ֗י אֱמוּנָתְךָ֣ וּתְשׁוּעָתְךָ֣ אָמָ֑רְתִּי לֹא־כִחַ֥דְתִּי חַסְדְּךָ֥ וַ֝אֲמִתְּךָ֗ לְקָהָ֥ל רָֽב׃	I have not hid thy righteousness within my heart; I have declared thy faithfulness and thy salvation: I have not concealed thy lovingkindness and thy truth from the great congregation.	τὴν δικαιοσύνην σου οὐκ ἔκρυψα ἐν τῇ καρδίᾳ μου, τὴν ἀλήθειάν σου καὶ τὸ σωτήριόν σου εἶπα, οὐκ ἔκρυψα τὸ ἔλεός σου καὶ τὴν ἀλήθειάν σου ἀπὸ συναγωγῆς πολλῆς.
11	אַתָּ֤ה יְהֹוָ֗ה לֹֽא־תִכְלָ֣א רַחֲמֶ֣יךָ מִמֶּ֑נִּי חַסְדְּךָ֥ וַ֝אֲמִתְּךָ֗ תָּמִ֥יד יִצְּרֽוּנִי׃	Withhold not thou thy tender mercies from me, O LORD: let thy lovingkindness and thy truth continually preserve me.	σὺ δέ, Κύριε, μὴ μακρύνῃς τοὺς οἰκτιρμούς σου ἀπ᾿ ἐμοῦ· τὸ ἔλεός σου καὶ ἡ ἀλήθειά σου διαπαντὸς ἀντιλάβοιντό μου.
12	כִּ֤י אָפְפֽוּ־עָלַ֨י ׀ רָע֡וֹת עַד־אֵ֬ין מִסְפָּ֗ר הִשִּׂיג֣וּנִי עֲ֭וֺנֹתַי וְלֹא־יָכֹ֣לְתִּי לִרְא֑וֹת עָצְמ֥וּ מִשַּׂעֲר֥וֹת רֹ֝אשִׁ֗י וְלִבִּ֥י עֲזָבָֽ נִי׃	For innumerable evils have compassed me about: mine iniquities have taken hold upon me, so that I am not able to look up; they are more than the hairs of mine head: therefore my heart faileth me.	ὅτι περιέσχον με κακά, ὧν οὐκ ἔστιν ἀριθμός, κατέλαβόν με αἱ ἀνομίαι μου, καὶ οὐκ ἠδυνήθην τοῦ βλέπειν· ἐπληθύνθησαν ὑπὲρ τὰς τρίχας τῆς κεφαλῆς μου, καὶ ἡ καρδία μου ἐγκατέλιπέ με.
13	רְצֵ֣ה יְ֭הֹוָה לְהַצִּילֵ֑נִי יְ֝הֹוָ֗ה לְעֶזְרָ֥תִי חֽוּשָׁה׃	Be pleased, O LORD, to deliver me: O LORD, make haste to help me.	εὐδόκησον, Κύριε, τοῦ ῥύσασθαί με· Κύριε, εἰς τὸ βοηθῆσαί μοι πρόσχες.
14	יֵ֘בֹ֤שׁוּ וְיַחְפְּר֨וּ ׀ יַחַד֮ מְבַקְשֵׁ֥י נַפְשִׁ֗י לִסְפּ֫וֹתָ֥הּ יִסֹּ֣גוּ אָ֭חוֹר וְיִכָּלְמ֑וּ חֲ֝פֵצֵ֗י רָעָתִֽי׃	Let them be ashamed and confounded together that seek after my soul to destroy it; let them be driven backward and put to shame that wish me evil.	καταισχυνθείησαν καὶ ἐντραπείησαν ἅμα οἱ ζητοῦντες τὴν ψυχήν μου τοῦ ἐξᾶραι αὐτήν· ἀποστραφείησαν εἰς τὰ ὀπίσω καὶ καταισχυνθείησαν οἱ θέλοντές μοι κακά·
15	יָ֭שֹׁמּוּ עַל־עֵ֣קֶב בׇּשְׁתָּ֑ם הָאֹמְרִ֥ים לִ֝֗י הֶ֘אָ֥ח ׀ הֶאָֽח׃	Let them be desolate for a reward of their shame that say unto me, Aha, aha.	κομισάσθωσαν παραχρῆμα αἰσχύνην αὐτῶν οἱ λέγοντές μοι· εὖγε, εὖγε.
16	יָ֘שִׂ֤ישׂוּ וְיִשְׂמְח֨וּ ׀ בְּךָ֗ כׇּֽל־מְבַ֫קְשֶׁ֥יךָ יֹאמְר֣וּ תָ֭מִיד יִגְדַּ֣ל יְהֹוָ֑ה אֹ֝הֲבֵ֗י תְּשׁוּעָתֶֽךָ׃	Let all those that seek thee rejoice and be glad in thee: let such as love thy salvation say continually, The LORD be magnified.	ἀγαλλιάσθωσαν καὶ εὐφρανθήτωσαν ἐπὶ σοὶ πάντες οἱ ζητοῦντές σε, Κύριε, καὶ εἰπάτωσαν διαπαντός· μεγαλυνθήτω ὁ Κύριος, οἱ ἀγαπῶντες τὸ σωτήριόν σου.
17	וַאֲנִ֤י ׀ עָנִ֣י וְאֶבְיוֹן֮ אֲדֹנָ֢י יַחֲשׇׁ֫ב־לִ֥י עֶזְרָתִ֣י וּמְפַלְטִ֣י אַ֑תָּה אֱ֝לֹהַ֗י אַל־תְּאַחַֽר׃	But I am poor and needy; yet the Lord thinketh upon me: thou art my help and my deliverer; make no tarrying, O my God.	ἐγὼ δὲ πτωχός εἰμι καὶ πένης, Κύριος φροντιεῖ μου. βοηθός μου καὶ ὑπερασπιστής μου εἶ σύ· ὁ Θεός μου, μὴ χρονίσῃς.
