= Psalm 41 =

Biblical psalm

- "Blessed is he that considereth the poor"
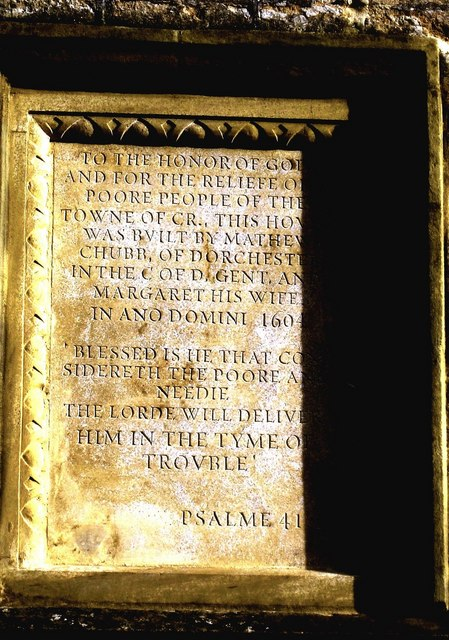
- 1604 inscription with Psalm 41. Chubb's Almshouses, Crewkerne, UK
- Other name: Psalm 40; "Beatus qui intellegit super egenum et pauperem"
- Language: Hebrew (original)

Psalm 41
- ← Psalm 40 Psalm 42 →
- Book: Book of Psalms
- Hebrew Bible part: Ketuvim
- Order in the Hebrew part: 1
- Category: Sifrei Emet
- Christian Bible part: Old Testament
- Order in the Christian part: 19

Psalm 41 is the 41st psalm of the Book of Psalms, beginning in English in the King James Version: "Blessed is he that considereth the poor". In the slightly different numbering system used in the Greek Septuagint version of the Bible, and generally in its Latin translations, this psalm is Psalm 40. In the Vulgate, it begins "Beatus qui intellegit super egenum et pauperem". The final psalm in Book One of the collection, is attributed to King David.

The psalm forms a regular part of Jewish, Catholic, Lutheran, Anglican and other Protestant liturgies and has often been set to music, including a metred German version set by Heinrich Schütz and Handel's Foundling Hospital Anthem.

== Uses ==
=== New Testament ===
Psalm 41 is quoted in the New Testament

- Verse 9 is quoted in John 13:18
- Verse 13 is quoted in Luke 1:68

Judas Iscariot is seen as the man who "lifts his heel" against his friend with whom he shares bread. This is poignant in the context of the Last Supper, as Jesus washed Judas' feet, shared bread with him and was repaid by Judas giving 'his heel' figuratively. This imagery is also ironic as the Messiah would crush the serpent's head under 'his heel' in a Christian view of Genesis 3.

=== Judaism ===
Verse 4 is found in the repetition of the Amidah during Rosh Hashanah.

Psalm 41 is one of the ten Psalms of the Tikkun HaKlali of Rebbe Nachman of Breslov.

=== Catholic Church ===
This psalm was traditionally performed during the celebration of Matins in abbeys, according to the Rule of Saint Benedict of Nursia established in 530. In the Liturgy of the Hours today, Psalm 41 is sung or recited at Vespers of a Friday of the first week. The main cycle of liturgical prayers takes place over four weeks.

=== Coptic Orthodox Church ===
In the Agpeya, the Coptic Church's book of hours, this psalm is prayed in the office of Terce.

=== Book of Common Prayer ===
In the Church of England's Book of Common Prayer, this psalm is appointed to be read on the evening of the eighth day of the month.

== Musical settings ==
Heinrich Schütz wrote a setting of a paraphrase of Psalm 41 in German, "Wohl mag der sein ein selig Mann", SWV 138, for the Becker Psalter, published first in 1628. The English text of Handel's Foundling Hospital Anthem for choir, composed for a fundraising concert, is adapted from the beginning of the psalm.

== Text ==
The following table shows the Hebrew text of the Psalm with vowels, alongside the Koine Greek text in the Septuagint and the English translation from the King James Version. Note that the meaning can slightly differ between these versions, as the Septuagint and the Masoretic Text come from different textual traditions. (Note: A 1917 translation directly from Hebrew to English by the Jewish Publication Society can be found here or here, and an 1844 translation directly from the Septuagint by L. C. L. Brenton can be found here. Both translations are in the public domain.) In the Septuagint, this psalm is numbered Psalm 40.

#	Hebrew	English	Greek
(Note: In the Jewish verse numbering, the ascription of this psalm is verse 1, and the rest of the psalm begins from verse 2. However, the Christian verse numbering does not count the ascription as a separate verse.)	לַמְנַצֵּ֗חַ מִזְמ֥וֹר לְדָוִֽד׃	(To the chief Musician, A Psalm of David.)	Εἰς τὸ τέλος· ψαλμὸς τῷ Δαυΐδ. -
1	אַ֭שְׁרֵי מַשְׂכִּ֣יל אֶל־דָּ֑ל בְּי֥וֹם רָ֝עָ֗ה יְֽמַלְּטֵ֥הוּ יְהֹוָֽה׃	Blessed is he that considereth the poor: the LORD will deliver him in time of trouble.	ΜΑΚΑΡΙΟΣ ὁ συνιῶν ἐπὶ πτωχὸν καὶ πένητα· ἐν ἡμέρᾳ πονηρᾷ ῥύσεται αὐτὸν ὁ Κύριος.
2	יְהֹוָ֤ה ׀ יִשְׁמְרֵ֣הוּ וִ֭יחַיֵּהוּ (יאשר) [וְאֻשַּׁ֣ר] בָּאָ֑רֶץ וְאַֽל־תִּ֝תְּנֵ֗הוּ בְּנֶ֣פֶשׁ אֹיְבָֽיו׃	The LORD will preserve him, and keep him alive; and he shall be blessed upon the earth: and thou wilt not deliver him unto the will of his enemies.	Κύριος διαφυλάξαι αὐτὸν καὶ ζήσαι αὐτὸν καὶ μακαρίσαι αὐτὸν ἐν τῇ γῇ καὶ μὴ παραδῷ αὐτὸν εἰς χεῖρας ἐχθρῶν αὐτοῦ.
3	יְֽהֹוָ֗ה יִ֭סְעָדֶנּוּ עַל־עֶ֣רֶשׂ דְּוָ֑י כׇּל־מִ֝שְׁכָּב֗וֹ הָפַ֥כְתָּ בְחׇלְיֽוֹ׃	The LORD will strengthen him upon the bed of languishing: thou wilt make all his bed in his sickness.	Κύριος βοηθήσαι αὐτῷ ἐπὶ κλίνης ὀδύνης αὐτοῦ· ὅλην τὴν κοίτην αὐτοῦ ἔστρεψας ἐν τῇ ἀῤῥωστίᾳ αὐτοῦ.
4	אֲֽנִי־אָ֭מַרְתִּי יְהֹוָ֣ה חׇנֵּ֑נִי רְפָאָ֥ה נַ֝פְשִׁ֗י כִּֽי־חָטָ֥אתִי לָֽךְ׃	I said, LORD, be merciful unto me: heal my soul; for I have sinned against thee.	ἐγὼ εἶπα· Κύριε, ἐλέησόν με, ἴασαι τὴν ψυχήν μου, ὅτι ἥμαρτόν σοι.
5	אוֹיְבַ֗י יֹאמְר֣וּ רַ֣ע לִ֑י מָתַ֥י יָ֝מ֗וּת וְאָבַ֥ד שְׁמֽוֹ׃	Mine enemies speak evil of me, When shall he die, and his name perish?	οἱ ἐχθροί μου εἶπαν κακά μοι· πότε ἀποθανεῖται, καὶ ἀπολεῖται τὸ ὄνομα αὐτοῦ;
6	וְאִם־בָּ֤א לִרְא֨וֹת ׀ שָׁ֤וְא יְדַבֵּ֗ר לִבּ֗וֹ יִקְבׇּץ־אָ֥וֶן ל֑וֹ יֵצֵ֖א לַח֣וּץ יְדַבֵּֽר׃	And if he come to see me, he speaketh vanity: his heart gathereth iniquity to itself; when he goeth abroad, he telleth it.	καὶ εἰσεπορεύετο τοῦ ἰδεῖν, μάτην ἐλάλει· ἡ καρδία αὐτοῦ συνήγαγεν ἀνομίαν ἑαυτῷ, ἐξεπορεύετο ἔξω καὶ ἐλάλει ἐπὶ τὸ αὐτό.
7	יַ֗חַד עָלַ֣י יִ֭תְלַחֲשׁוּ כׇּל־שֹׂנְאָ֑י עָלַ֓י ׀ יַחְשְׁב֖וּ רָעָ֣ה לִֽי׃	All that hate me whisper together against me: against me do they devise my hurt.	κατ᾿ ἐμοῦ ἐψιθύριζον πάντες οἱ ἐχθροί μου, κατ᾿ ἐμοῦ ἐλογίζοντο κακά μοι·
8	דְּֽבַר־בְּ֭לִיַּעַל יָצ֣וּק בּ֑וֹ וַאֲשֶׁ֥ר שָׁ֝כַ֗ב לֹא־יוֹסִ֥יף לָקֽוּם׃	An evil disease, say they, cleaveth fast unto him: and now that he lieth he shall rise up no more.	λόγον παράνομον κατέθεντο κατ᾿ ἐμοῦ· μὴ ὁ κοιμώμενος οὐχὶ προσθήσει τοῦ ἀναστῆναι;
9	גַּם־אִ֤ישׁ שְׁלוֹמִ֨י ׀ אֲשֶׁר־בָּטַ֣חְתִּי ב֭וֹ אוֹכֵ֣ל לַחְמִ֑י הִגְדִּ֖יל עָלַ֣י עָקֵֽב׃	Yea, mine own familiar friend, in whom I trusted, which did eat of my bread, hath lifted up his heel against me.	καὶ γὰρ ὁ ἄνθρωπος τῆς εἰρήνης μου, ἐφ᾿ ὃν ἤλπισα, ὁ ἐσθίων ἄρτους μου, ἐμεγάλυνεν ἐπ᾿ ἐμὲ πτερνισμόν.
10	וְאַתָּ֤ה יְהֹוָ֗ה חׇנֵּ֥נִי וַהֲקִימֵ֑נִי וַאֲשַׁלְּמָ֥ה לָהֶֽם׃	But thou, O LORD, be merciful unto me, and raise me up, that I may requite them.	σὺ δέ, Κύριε, ἐλέησόν με καὶ ἀνάστησόν με, καὶ ἀνταποδώσω αὐτοῖς.
11	בְּזֹ֣את יָ֭דַעְתִּי כִּֽי־חָפַ֣צְתָּ בִּ֑י כִּ֤י לֹֽא־יָרִ֖יעַ אֹיְבִ֣י עָלָֽי׃	By this I know that thou favourest me, because mine enemy doth not triumph over me.	ἐν τούτῳ ἔγνων ὅτι τεθέληκάς με, ὅτι οὐ μὴ ἐπιχαρῇ ὁ ἐχθρός μου ἐπ᾿ ἐμέ.
12	וַאֲנִ֗י בְּ֭תֻמִּי תָּמַ֣כְתָּ בִּ֑י וַתַּצִּיבֵ֖נִי לְפָנֶ֣יךָ לְעוֹלָֽם׃	And as for me, thou upholdest me in mine integrity, and settest me before thy face for ever.	ἐμοῦ δὲ διὰ τὴν ἀκακίαν ἀντελάβου, καὶ ἐβεβαίωσάς με ἐνώπιόν σου εἰς τὸν αἰῶνα.
13	בָּ֘ר֤וּךְ יְהֹוָ֨ה ׀ אֱלֹ֘הֵ֤י יִשְׂרָאֵ֗ל מֵֽ֭הָעוֹלָם וְעַ֥ד הָעוֹלָ֗ם אָ֘מֵ֥ן ׀ וְאָמֵֽן׃	Blessed be the LORD God of Israel from everlasting, and to everlasting. Amen, and Amen.	εὐλογητὸς Κύριος ὁ Θεὸς ᾿Ισραὴλ ἀπὸ τοῦ αἰῶνος καὶ εἰς τὸν αἰῶνα. γένοιτο, γένοιτο.

The last verse represents a liturgical conclusion to the first segment of the Book of Psalms. Alexander Kirkpatrick also suggests that this psalm "ends the first book of the Psalter ... with a hope, destined to be illuminated with a new light by the revelation of the Gospel".
