= Songs of Farewell =

1918 composition by Hubert Parry

- Six choral motets by Hubert Parry
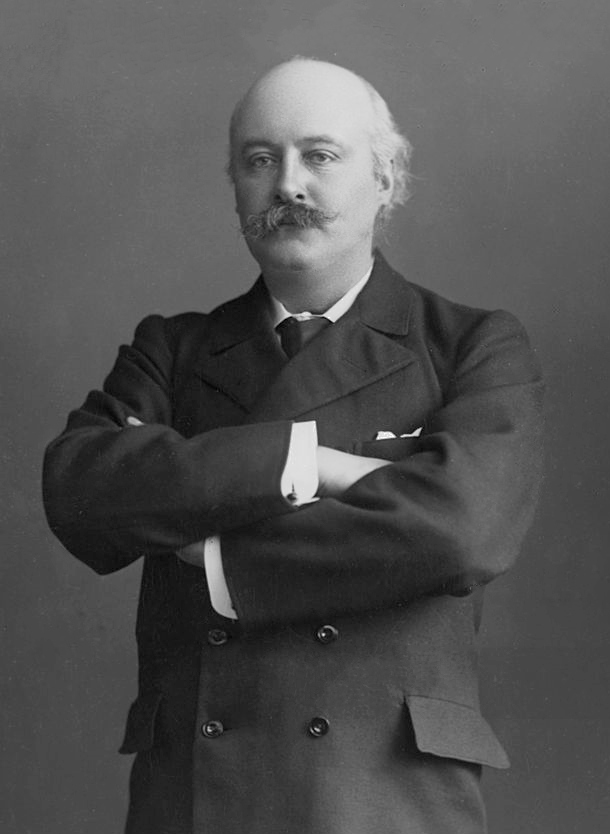
- Hubert Parry
- Year: 1916
- Period: Romantic
- Genre: Choral music
- Text: Poems by Henry Vaughan, John Davies, Thomas Campion, John Gibson Lockhart, John Donne; and the Book of Common Prayer
- Language: English
- Composed: 1916–1918: England

Premiere
- Date: 22 May 1916,
- Location: Royal College of Music (first 5 pieces only)

Songs of Farewell is a set of six choral motets by the British composer Hubert Parry. The pieces were composed between 1916 and 1918 and were among his last compositions before his death.

== Background ==
The songs were written during the First World War when a number of Parry's pupils at the Royal College of Music were being killed in action. Parry's choice of texts are thought to reflect a yearning to escape the violence of a world at war, and to find peace in a heavenly realm. In contrast to Parry's assured 1916 setting of William Blake's poem "And did those feet in ancient time", "Jerusalem", Songs of Farewell is seen as representing a decline in national confidence. During the war, Parry lost many of his students, George Butterworth was killed, Arthur Bliss wounded and Ivor Gurney was gassed. Having been a lifelong Germanophile, who previously believed that Britain would never go to war with the Kaiser, the war proved to be a time of personal despair for Parry, which is reflected in the six pieces.

== Performance ==
The first concert performance of Songs of Farewell took place at the Royal College of Music on 22 May 1916, when The Bach Choir sang the first five pieces, directed by Hugh Allen. Parry's piece was well received by critics; reviews in The Daily Telegraph and The Musical Times praised the pieces, and a review in The Times said that the fifth song, ""At the round earth's imagined corners", was "one of the most impressive short choral works written in recent years".

Parry died on 7 October 1918 and one of the pieces from Songs of Farewell, "There is an old belief", was sung at the composer's funeral in St Paul's Cathedral. The first performance of the complete set of six songs was at a memorial service to Parry held in the chapel of Exeter College, Oxford on 23 February 1919, four months after his death.

Songs from the Songs of Farewell are now part of the repertoire of Anglican church music and are often sung as anthems at services in churches and cathedrals.

Motet 1 (My soul, there is a country) was sung during the funeral service of Elizabeth II at Westminster Abbey.

== Songs ==
The six motets consist of poems by British poets and a text from the Coverdale translation of the Psalter found in the 1662 Book of Common Prayer, set to music for unaccompanied choir.

"My soul, there is a country"
Text by Henry Vaughan, set for SATB choir in G major

"I know my soul hath power"
Text by John Davies, set for SATB choir in B♭ major

"Never weather-beaten sail"
Text by Thomas Campion, set for SSATB choir in C major

"There is an old belief"
Text by John Gibson Lockhart, set for SSATBB choir in G major

"At the round earth's imagined corners"
Text from Holy Sonnets No. 7 by John Donne, set for SSAATBB choir in B minor

"Lord, let me know mine end"
Text from Psalm 39 from the Book of Common Prayer, set for SATB double choir in D major

== Notable recordings ==
- Parry: Songs Of Farewell; Stanford: Magnificat, Eternal Father, Three Motets — Choir of Trinity College, Cambridge, Richard Marlow (Conifer, 1987)
- I Was Glad — Cathedral Music By Parry — Choir of St George's Chapel, Windsor Castle, Christopher Robinson (Hyperion Records, 1988)
- Hubert Parry — Songs of Farewell — Tenebrae, Nigel Short (Signum Records, 2011)
- Parry: Songs of Farewell and other choral works — Choir of New College, Oxford, Robert Quinney Novum Records, August 2018
- An Old Belief — The Sixteen, Harry Christophers (The Sixteen Productions Ltd, 2022)

== See also ==
- List of compositions by Hubert Parry
