= Cyclone Static =

American punk rock band

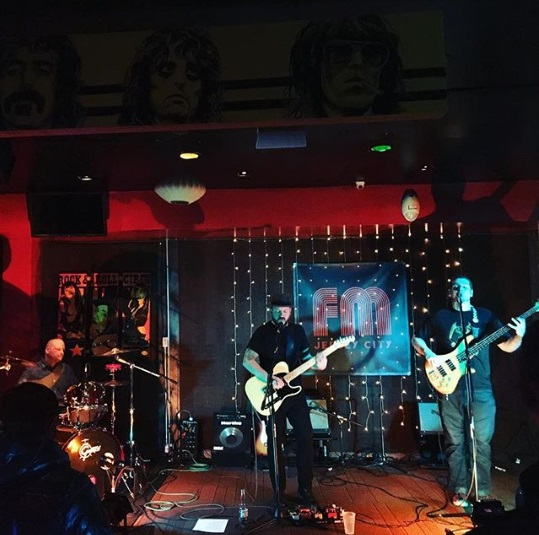
- Cyclone Static at FM Jersey City in February 2019

Background information
- Origin: Jersey City, New Jersey, U.S.
- Years active: 2016–present
- Label: Mint 400 Records
- Members: Jonathan LeVine; John Mathais; James Salerno

Cyclone Static is an American punk rock band from New Jersey.

== History ==
Cyclone Static is a melodic punk rock band from Jersey City, New Jersey. Vocalist and guitarist James Salerno played in a band with drummer Jonathan LeVine in 1990s called Drywater. In an interview with The Jersey Journal, LeVine recalls "we never got picked up by a label [and] we never really did much. It really sounded a lot like Cyclone Static except today we're a lot more mature." The group disbanded, but rejoined in 2016, along with bassist John Mathais.

Cyclone Static draws comparison to the music of Dinosaur Jr., Nirvana, and Guided by Voices, and cite inspiration from 70's punk, 80's hardcore and 90's alternative. Post-hardcore band Thursday's lead vocalist Geoff Rickly, describes them as "an anomaly in modern music[;] not just to a time of punk rock on the radio but a whole lost New Jersey paradise: Asbury Park before the renaissance, radios cranking out surf guitars and sandy, beach-blown harmonies, through empty lots full of downed power lines and bombed-out buildings."

=== Mint 400 Records ===
LeVine met Mint 400 Records' Neil Sabatino in the 1990s through playing shows, and they reconnected before performing at the North Jersey Indie Rock Festival, on September 23, 2017. Their first release was "Company Man," on the Mint 400 Records promotional compilation, NJ / NY Mixtape. In 2018, they released the single "Walk This Line," which Jedd Beaudoin of PopMatters describes as a "salvo of relentless punk attitude that bridges the gap between punk's rawest, early days and its culmination as a mainstream force in the 1990s," and the single, "From Scratch." Their debut album, entitled From Scratch, was released with Mint 400 Records on February 8, 2019. The ten-track album is described as garage rock and "angst-filled pop." Florian Meissner of Soundblab compares From Scratch to the Unseen, Roger Miret and the Disasters, and the Buzzcocks, and calls it "38 minutes of punk rock song after punk rock song."

== Members ==
- Jonathan LeVine – drums
- Jack Gibson – bass and backing vocals
- James Salerno – vocals and guitar

== Past members ==
- John Mathais - Bass
- Danny Patierno - Bass
- Moose Kahrs - Bass

== Discography ==
Albums and EPs

- From Scratch (2019)
- Cave Pop (2023)

Singles

- "Walk This Line" (2018)
- "From Scratch" (2018)

Appearing on

- NJ / NY Mixtape (2018)
