= Notebook (disambiguation) =

A notebook is a small book often used for writing.

Notebook or The Notebook may also refer to:

== Computing ==
- Laptop, a type of personal computer
  - Notebook computer, a specific, smaller class of laptop
- Google Notebook, a discontinued online application
- Notebook interface, a type of programming environment

== Books ==
- Notebook (style), a writing technique
- The Notebook (1986), a novel by Ágota Kristóf
- "The Notebook" (1994), a poem from Early Work by Patti Smith
- The Notebook (novel) (1996), by Nicholas Sparks

== Film, stage and TV ==
- The Notebook (2004), an American romantic drama film directed by Nick Cassavetes, based on the Sparks novel
- Notebook (2006 film), an Indian romantic drama directed by Rosshan Andrrews
- The Notebook (2013 Hungarian film), a Hungarian drama directed by János Szász, based on the Kristóf novel
- Notebook (2013 Nepali film), a Nepali romance directed by Yogesh Ghimire
- Notebook (2019 film), a 2019 Indian Hindi-language romantic drama film
- The Notebook (musical), a musical theatre adaptation of the 1996 novel that premiered in 2022 and opened on Broadway in 2024
- The Notebook (TV series), a 2023–2024 Iranian comedy drama crime mystery series

== Music ==
- The Partridge Family Notebook, a 1972 album by The Partridge Family
- The Notebook, the soundtrack by Aaron Zigman 2004
- "Notebook", a song by American singer Melanie Martinez from her 2020 deluxe album K-12

== Other ==
- The Philadelphia Public School Notebook a bimonthly newspaper
- Handy Dandy Notebook, a notebook used in the Blue's Clues franchise.

== See also ==
- Notepad (disambiguation)
