= From Scratch (radio) =

- Running time: 1 hour
- Country of origin: United States
- Language(s): English
- Syndicates: Sirius XM
- Hosted by: Jessica Harris
- Website: www.fromscratchradio.org

From Scratch is a public radio show about the entrepreneurial life broadcast weekly on National Public Radio's Sirius XM channel NPR Now and on NPR Worldwide. The program is hosted by Jessica Harris. From Scratch personalizes the lives of entrepreneurs by providing listeners with a candid, first-hand view of the launching process. Guests speak openly about their sources of inspiration, setbacks, helpful allies, and breakthrough moments. Featuring business, social and cultural leaders in all stages of the building process, From Scratch informs those who are either initiating their own entrepreneurial lives or simply feeling curious about those who make new ideas happen.

== Format ==
Each show typically consists of two guests. Harris interviews her guests in person. Most of her interviews are conducted in a studio in New York City, but some are recorded “on the road” while Jessica is traveling to another state or country. On occasion, interviews are remotely recorded. The style of the interviews is very conversational. Guests paint a personal picture of their experiences through anecdotes.

== Host ==
Jessica Harris is the producer and host of the show. In addition to hosting From Scratch, Harris directed and produced the critically acclaimed documentary "On Common Ground" about a World War II reconciliation that featured commentary by Tom Brokaw, Walter Cronkite, and John Kenneth Galbraith. She also worked for Woody Allen on the film Sweet and Lowdown. Jessica is a board member of Jacob’s Pillow and the Berkshire Arts and Technology Charter Public School, located in the Berkshires in Massachusetts, and the Civilians Theater Company, located in New York City. Jessica resides in Manhattan with her husband and six children.

== Guests ==
Guests on From Scratch come from a variety of backgrounds, including the business, social sector, entertainment and the arts. Her guests depict entrepreneurship not merely as a vehicle for money but as a lifestyle choice and philosophy.

== Staff ==
- Jessica Harris, Founder, Producer and Host
- Brian Williams - Web Designer
