= Psalm 39 =

Biblical psalm

- "I said, I will take heed to my ways, that I sin not with my tongue"
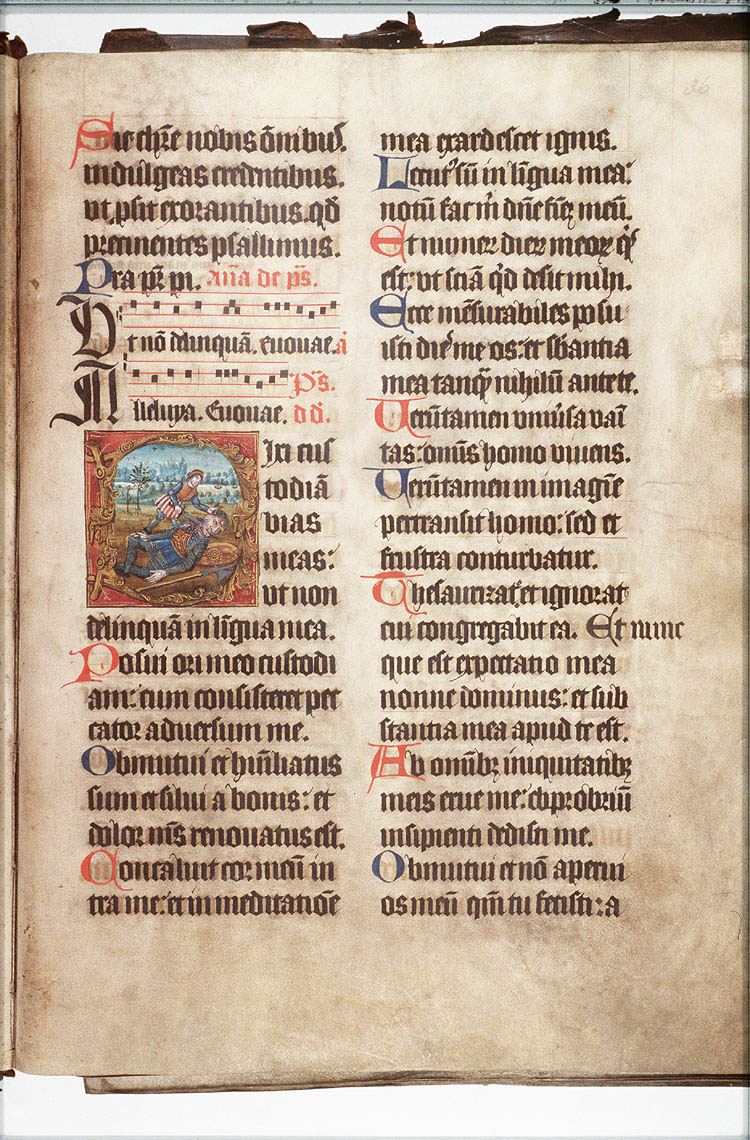
- Psalm 39 in a Franciscan manuscript
- Other name: Psalm 38; "Dixi custodiam vias meas"
- Language: Hebrew (original)

Psalm 39
- ← Psalm 38 Psalm 40 →
- Book: Book of Psalms
- Hebrew Bible part: Ketuvim
- Order in the Hebrew part: 1
- Category: Sifrei Emet
- Christian Bible part: Old Testament
- Order in the Christian part: 19

Psalm 39 is the 39th psalm of the Book of Psalms, beginning in English in the King James Version: "I said, I will take heed to my ways, that I sin not with my tongue". The Book of Psalms is part of the third section of the Hebrew Bible, and a book of the Christian Old Testament. In the slightly different numbering system used in the Greek Septuagint and Latin Vulgate translations of the Bible, this psalm is Psalm 38. In Latin, it is known as "Dixi custodiam vias meas". It is a meditation on the fragility of man before God, ending in a prayer for a peaceful life.

The psalm forms a regular part of Jewish, Catholic, Lutheran, Anglican and other Protestant liturgies and is appointed in the Anglican Book of Common Prayer to be read at funerals. It has inspired hymns based on it, and has often been set to music. It was set by Baroque composers such as Heinrich Schütz, and single verses were used prominently in major works by Johannes Brahms in Ein deutsches Requiem and by Igor Stravinsky in his Symphony of Psalms.

== Background and themes ==
According to the Talmud (Bava Batra 14a–b), this is one of the ten psalms authored by Moses. Matthew Henry attributes it to David, stating that he must have been in emotional turmoil or beset by enemies when he wrote the psalm, and struggled to wait patiently for God's salvation.

According to Brueggemann and Bellinger, "Psalm 39 articulates hope and despair simultaneously", as it tries to come to terms with "the transience and troubles of life". Other Christian scholars see the psalm as an analogy to one's sins, where "he" is representative of the "members of his body" (Christians). Adam Clarke summarizes the psalm as follows: "Faith has always to struggle with difficulties. Though he was confident that God was his hope, yet ... troubles of life come ever into his memory; his prayer is that his God will provide for him". Charles Spurgeon sees the psalm saying there is a time to be silent and a time to speak, while Hans Werner sees an inner struggle for David to control his tongue.

Rabbeinu Bachya teaches on verse 12, which mentions both prayer and tears, that "prayer needs tears".

== Structure ==
The numbering of the verses differs between the Hebrew and Latin versions.

Clarke holds that the psalm:

1. relates the care and watchfulness over one's thoughts, tongue, and actions, vv. 1–3;
2. considers the brevity and uncertainty of human life, vv. 4–7;
3. prays for deliverance from sin, vv. 8–11; and
4. asks that the author be protected and spared until he is fitted for another world, vv. 12, 13.

Spurgeon broke the psalm down as follows:

1. Burdened with many sorrows vv. 1–2;
2. Prayer in his torment vv. 3–6;
3. Submission to God vv. 7–13;
4. Relief and trust.

The Old Testament scholar Hermann Gunkel, in his standard work The Psalms, believes the structuring of the verses was originally:

1. Verses 2–4: Introduction to and emergence of the poem
2. Verses 5ff: The actual poem
3. Verses 5–7 and 12: General considerations
4. Verses 8 and 13c.d: Return to yourself
5. Verses 13a.b, 9–11 and verse 14: The actual dirge

== Heading ==
The heading, verse 1 in the Hebrew text, addresses the song to Jeduthun. According to Rashi, this refers either to one of the Levite singers or to the name of a musical instrument. Psalms 62 and 77 are also addressed to Jeduthun.

== Uses ==
=== Judaism ===
Verse 13 is part of Selichot.

=== Catholic Church ===
Traditionally, this psalm was recited or sung in monasteries during the Monday of matins, according to the rule of Saint Benedict of 530 AD. In the current Liturgy of the Hours, it is sung or recited in the Office of Readings on the Wednesday of the second week of the four-weekly cycle of liturgical prayers.

=== Book of Common Prayer ===
In the Church of England's Book of Common Prayer, this psalm is appointed to be read on the morning of the eighth day of the month.

=== Hebel est omnia Adam ===
William Brewster, one of the Pilgrim Fathers, used the motto Hebel est omnia Adam, a Hebrew–Latin phrase taken from verse 5, next to his signature to indicate the vanity of man.

== Musical settings ==
Hymns paraphrasing Psalm 39 include "Almighty maker of my frame" by Anne Steele.

Heinrich Schütz set the psalm in German with the text from the Becker Psalter, "In meinem Herzen hab ich mir" (In my heart I [told] myself), for choir as his SWV 136. Verses 4 to 7 in German, "Herr, lehre doch mich" (Lord, teach me) are used in the third movement of Ein deutsches Requiem by Johannes Brahms, for baritone, choir and orchestra. Verses 13 and 14 in Latin are used in the first movement of the Symphony of Psalms by Igor Stravinsky.

The text of the psalm in English (verses 4 onwards) has been set to music as a motet by Maurice Greene, and by Sir Hubert Parry as the final of six motets in his choral work Songs of Farewell. Both works are entitled "Lord, Let Me Know Mine End".

== Text ==
The following table shows the Hebrew text of the Psalm with vowels, alongside the Koine Greek text in the Septuagint and the English translation from the King James Version. Note that the meaning can slightly differ between these versions, as the Septuagint and the Masoretic Text come from different textual traditions. (Note: A 1917 translation directly from Hebrew to English by the Jewish Publication Society can be found here or here, and an 1844 translation directly from the Septuagint by L. C. L. Brenton can be found here. Both translations are in the public domain.) In the Septuagint, this psalm is numbered Psalm 38.

#	Hebrew	English	Greek
(Note: In the Jewish verse numbering, the ascription of this psalm is verse 1, and the rest of the psalm begins from verse 2. However, the Christian verse numbering does not count the ascription as a separate verse.)	לַמְנַצֵּ֥חַ (לידיתון) [לִֽידוּת֗וּן] מִזְמ֥וֹר לְדָוִֽד׃	(To the chief Musician, even to Jeduthun, A Psalm of David.)	Εἰς τὸ τέλος, τῷ ᾿Ιδιθούν· ᾠδὴ τῷ Δαυΐδ. -
1	אָמַ֗רְתִּי אֶ֥שְׁמְרָ֣ה דְרָכַי֮ מֵחֲט֢וֹא בִלְשׁ֫וֹנִ֥י אֶשְׁמְרָ֥ה לְפִ֥י מַחְס֑וֹם בְּעֹ֖ד רָשָׁ֣ע לְנֶגְדִּֽי	I said, I will take heed to my ways, that I sin not with my tongue: I will keep my mouth with a bridle, while the wicked is before me.	ΕΙΠΑ· φυλάξω τὰς ὁδούς μου τοῦ μὴ ἁμαρτάνειν με ἐν γλώσσῃ μου· ἐθέμην τῷ στόματί μου φυλακὴν ἐν τῷ συστῆναι τὸν ἁμαρτωλὸν ἐναντίον μου.
2	נֶאֱלַ֣מְתִּי ד֭וּמִיָּה הֶחֱשֵׁ֣יתִי מִטּ֑וֹב וּכְאֵבִ֥י נֶעְכָּֽר׃	I was dumb with silence, I held my peace, even from good; and my sorrow was stirred.	ἐκωφώθην καὶ ἐταπεινώθην καὶ ἐσίγησα ἐξ ἀγαθῶν, καὶ τὸ ἄλγημά μου ἀνεκαινίσθη.
3	חַם־לִבִּ֨י ׀ בְּקִרְבִּ֗י בַּהֲגִיגִ֥י תִבְעַר־אֵ֑שׁ דִּ֝בַּ֗רְתִּי בִּלְשׁוֹנִֽי׃	My heart was hot within me, while I was musing the fire burned: then spake I with my tongue,	ἐθερμάνθη ἡ καρδία μου ἐντός μου, καὶ ἐν τῇ μελέτῃ μου ἐκκαυθήσεται πῦρ. ἐλάλησα ἐν γλώσσῃ μου·
4	הוֹדִ֘יעֵ֤נִי יְהֹוָ֨ה ׀ קִצִּ֗י וּמִדַּ֣ת יָמַ֣י מַה־הִ֑יא אֵ֝דְעָ֗ה מֶֽה־חָדֵ֥ל אָֽנִי׃	LORD, make me to know mine end, and the measure of my days, what it is: that I may know how frail I am.	γνώρισόν μοι, Κύριε, τὸ πέρας μου καὶ τὸν ἀριθμὸν τῶν ἡμερῶν μου, τίς ἐστιν, ἵνα γνῶ τί ὑστερῶ ἐγώ.
5	הִנֵּ֤ה טְפָח֨וֹת ׀ נָ֘תַ֤תָּה יָמַ֗י וְחֶלְדִּ֣י כְאַ֣יִן נֶגְדֶּ֑ךָ אַ֥ךְ כׇּֽל־הֶ֥בֶל כׇּל־אָ֝דָ֗ם נִצָּ֥ב סֶֽלָה׃	Behold, thou hast made my days as an handbreadth; and mine age is as nothing before thee: verily every man at his best state is altogether vanity. Selah.	ἰδοὺ παλαιστὰς ἔθου τὰς ἡμέρας μου, καὶ ἡ ὑπόστασίς μου ὡσεὶ οὐθὲν ἐνώπιόν σου· πλὴν τὰ σύμπαντα ματαιότης, πᾶς ἄνθρωπος ζῶν. (διάψαλμα).
6	אַךְ־בְּצֶ֤לֶם ׀ יִֽתְהַלֶּךְ־אִ֗ישׁ אַךְ־הֶ֥בֶל יֶהֱמָי֑וּן יִ֝צְבֹּ֗ר וְֽלֹא־יֵדַ֥ע מִֽי־אֹסְפָֽם׃	Surely every man walketh in a vain shew: surely they are disquieted in vain: he heapeth up riches, and knoweth not who shall gather them.	μέντοιγε ἐν εἰκόνι διαπορεύεται ἄνθρωπος, πλὴν μάτην ταράσσεται· θησαυρίζει καὶ οὐ γινώσκει τίνι συνάξει αὐτά.
7	וְעַתָּ֣ה מַה־קִּוִּ֣יתִי אֲדֹנָ֑י תּ֝וֹחַלְתִּ֗י לְךָ֣ הִֽיא׃	And now, Lord, what wait I for? my hope is in thee.	καὶ νῦν τίς ἡ ὑπομονή μου; οὐχὶ ὁ Κύριος; καὶ ἡ ὑπόστασίς μου παρὰ σοί ἐστιν.
8	מִכׇּל־פְּשָׁעַ֥י הַצִּילֵ֑נִי חֶרְפַּ֥ת נָ֝בָ֗ל אַל־תְּשִׂימֵֽנִי׃	Deliver me from all my transgressions: make me not the reproach of the foolish.	ἀπὸ πασῶν τῶν ἀνομιῶν μου ῥῦσαί με, ὄνειδος ἄφρονι ἔδωκάς με.
9	נֶ֭אֱלַמְתִּי לֹ֣א אֶפְתַּח־פִּ֑י כִּ֖י אַתָּ֣ה עָשִֽׂיתָ׃	I was dumb, I opened not my mouth; because thou didst it.	ἐκωφώθην καὶ οὐκ ἤνοιξα τὸ στόμα μου, ὅτι σὺ ἐποίησας.
10	הָסֵ֣ר מֵעָלַ֣י נִגְעֶ֑ךָ מִתִּגְרַ֥ת יָ֝דְךָ֗ אֲנִ֣י כָלִֽיתִי׃	Remove thy stroke away from me: I am consumed by the blow of thine hand.	ἀπόστησον ἀπ᾿ ἐμοῦ τὰς μάστιγάς σου· ἀπὸ γὰρ τῆς ἰσχύος τῆς χειρός σου ἐγὼ ἐξέλιπον.
11	בְּֽתוֹכָ֘ח֤וֹת עַל־עָוֺ֨ן ׀ יִסַּ֬רְתָּ אִ֗ישׁ וַתֶּ֣מֶס כָּעָ֣שׁ חֲמוּד֑וֹ אַ֤ךְ הֶ֖בֶל כׇּל־אָדָ֣ם סֶֽלָה׃	When thou with rebukes dost correct man for iniquity, thou makest his beauty to consume away like a moth: surely every man is vanity. Selah.	ἐν ἐλεγμοῖς ὑπὲρ ἀνομίας ἐπαίδευσας ἄνθρωπον καὶ ἐξέτηξας ὡς ἀράχνην τὴν ψυχὴν αὐτοῦ· πλὴν μάτην ταράσσεται πᾶς ἄνθρωπος. (διάψαλμα).
12	שִׁ֥מְעָֽה תְפִלָּתִ֨י ׀ יְהֹוָ֡ה וְשַׁוְעָתִ֨י ׀ הַאֲזִינָה֮ אֶֽל־דִּמְעָתִ֗י אַֽל־תֶּ֫חֱרַ֥שׁ כִּ֤י גֵ֣ר אָנֹכִ֣י עִמָּ֑ךְ תּ֝וֹשָׁ֗ב כְּכׇל־אֲבוֹתָֽי׃	Hear my prayer, O LORD, and give ear unto my cry; hold not thy peace at my tears: for I am a stranger with thee, and a sojourner, as all my fathers were.	εἰσάκουσον τῆς προσευχῆς μου, Κύριε, καὶ τῆς δεήσεώς μου, ἐνώτισαι τῶν δακρύων μου· μὴ παρασιωπήσῃς, ὅτι πάροικος ἐγώ εἰμι παρὰ σοὶ καὶ παρεπίδημος καθὼς πάντες οἱ πατέρες μου.
13	הָשַׁ֣ע מִמֶּ֣נִּי וְאַבְלִ֑יגָה בְּטֶ֖רֶם אֵלֵ֣ךְ וְאֵינֶֽנִּי׃	O spare me, that I may recover strength, before I go hence, and be no more.	ἄνες μοι, ἵνα ἀναψύξω πρὸ τοῦ με ἀπελθεῖν καὶ οὐκέτι μὴ ὑπάρξω.
