= Jonathan LeVine =

American art dealer

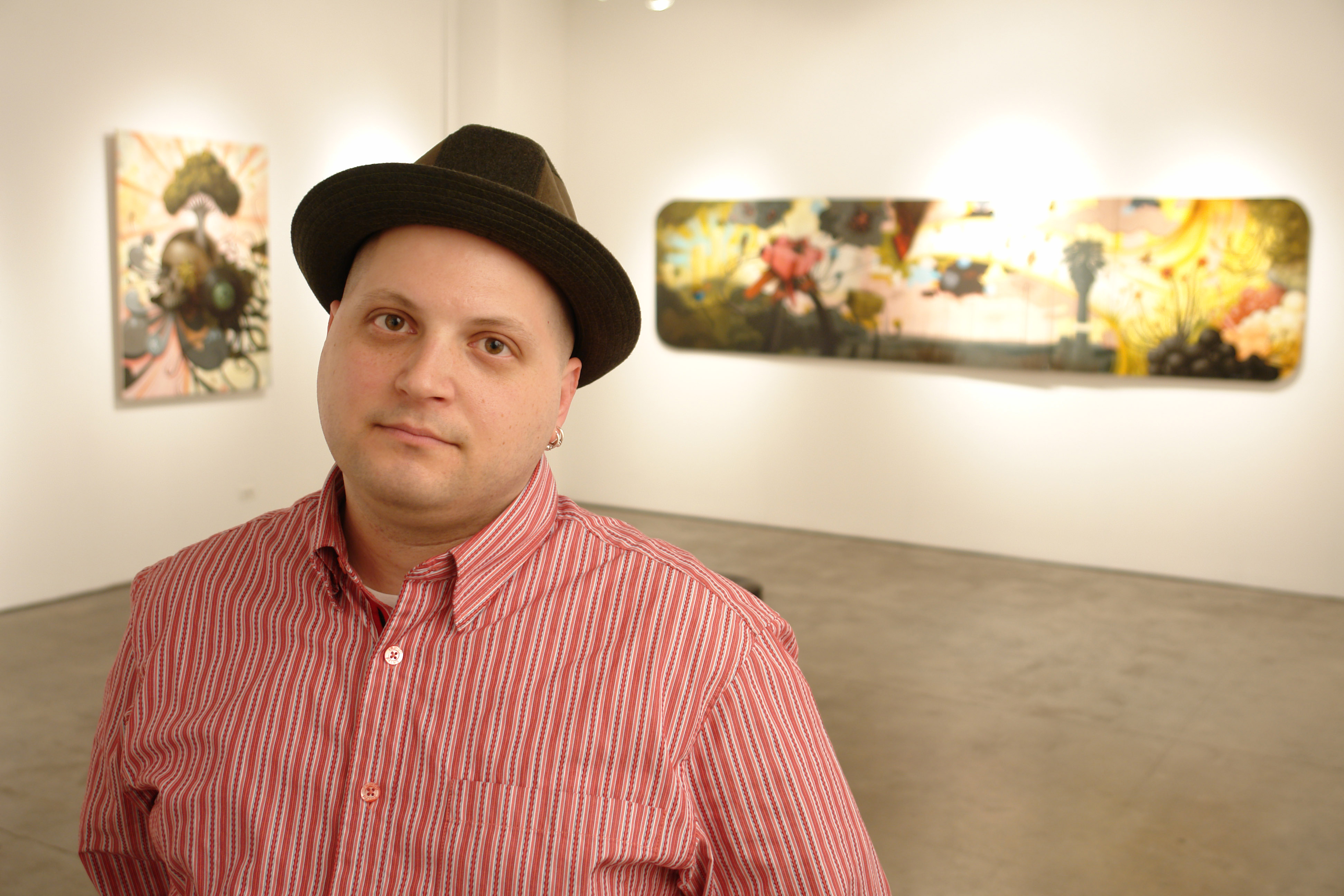
- LeVine at Jonathan LeVine Gallery on September 18, 2008
- Born: 1968 (age 57–58)
- Education: Montclair State University
- Occupation: Art dealer and gallerist
- Years active: 2001
- Known for: Jonathan LeVine Gallery, Jonathan LeVine Projects
- Website: jonathanlevineprojects.com

Jonathan LeVine is an American art dealer, instrumental in the proliferation of lowbrow and street art on the East Coast of the United States.

== About ==
LeVine grew up in Trenton, New Jersey. As a teenager, he encountered punk rock music and the punk scene, and began producing fanzines, promoting shows, and booking bands. He attended Montclair State University, and graduated with a degree in sculpture. Beginning in 1994, and while working at Montclair State University, LeVine became an independent curator, exhibiting punk flyers, comics, graffiti, and tattoo art at punk rock venues CBGB, Webster Hall, Max Fish and Maxwell's. Prominent artists in his early exhibitions included the contemporary artist Ron English, the visual artist and musician Daniel Johnston, and the street artist Shepard Fairey. In February 2001, LeVine opened a small gallery called Tin Man Alley in New Hope, Pennsylvania. Tin Man Alley initially sold vintage toys, novelty items, and lowbrow art. LeVine moved his gallery in 2005 to Manhattan, New York City.

=== Gallery ===
In January 2005, LeVine opened the Jonathan LeVine Gallery to the Chelsea neighborhood of Manhattan, at 529 West 20th Street. The gallery promoted graffiti art as fine art, holding a major group show in conjunction with São Paulo's Choque Cultural gallery, in 2007. Work by eight Brazilian street and graffiti artists was exhibited as Ruas De São Paulo. That June, LeVine rented a temporary space, in the Dumbo section of Brooklyn, for Shepard Fairey's exhibition, entitled E Pluribus Venom, and in December LeVine had an international street art show called, entitled The Streets of Europe, which featured artists from France and England. The show included the contemporary artist Bo130, the graffiti artist Blek le Rat, the street artist D*Face, and the urban artist Invader. In 2010, he curated a large group show for the fifth anniversary of his gallery, and some of the works were also showcased on The New York Times website, with audio commentary by LeVine.

In early 2012, Gingko Press released Delusional, a biography on LeVine and retrospective of the foundation and development of the Jonathan LeVine Gallery. In it, the author notes LeVine "has nourished a much needed alternative viewpoint within the stilted New York art market." Later that year, the gallery presented Détournement: Signs of the Times, an anticipated group exhibition by curator Carlo McCormick, which featured work by the street artist and realist painter Dan Witz, the photographer and artist Jack Pierson, and Ron English. Nicola Verlato's How The West Was Won was also shown that year. In early 2014, the gallery expanded to a second location in Chelsea, Manhattan, and that same year LeVine partnered with the art magazine Juxtapoz to present Art Truancy: Celebrating 20 Years of Juxtapoz Magazine.

In 2017, the gallery relocated to Jersey City, New Jersey, and was renamed as Jonathan LeVine Projects. It was located at the cultural center Mana Contemporary, and the opening exhibition, entitled Welcome to New Jersey, highlighted street, pop surrealism, and hyper realism art. In 2017 and 2018, LeVine held the Delusional Art Competition, which allows emerging artists the opportunity for solo exhibition in his gallery. In 2018, LeVine relocated the gallery to 150 Bay Street in Jersey City.

=== Other work ===
In the 1990s, LeVine played in a band called Drywater that reformed in 2016, as Cyclone Static.

== Accolades ==
LeVine is noted for being a standout contemporary art curator, on the forefront of cutting-edge art trends. Christopher Rodgers of The Jersey Journal asserts that LeVine has "had success helping the careers of many artists." Madonna, Marilyn Manson and Mark Parker have purchased work from LeVine.
