= String Quartet No. 3 (Parry) =

Hubert Parry's String Quartet No. 3 in G major was composed in 1878, the year before he composed his Piano Quintet and Cello Sonata, first performed in 1880. The work remained unpublished during the composers lifetime and was considered lost until it was discovered amongst Gerald Finzi's papers in the 1990s.

== Background ==
Parry began work on the quartet in late 1877 and it was completed by early 1878, it had been planned to premier the quartet that year, but the plan was abandoned and following some revisions the work was premiered on 26 February 1880 by a string quartet that included cellist Jules-Bernard Lasserre, who in 1883 became the dedicatee of Parry's Cello Sonata in A major.

While Parry was pleased with the performance, he did express concerns about the audiences reaction to the work and this may explain why did not pursue publication of the quartet and why there do not seem to have been any further performances during his lifetime. Following Parry's death the manuscript went missing until it was discovered in 1992 by musicologists Stephen Banfield and Philip Thomas amongst a set of manuscripts belonging to composer Gerald Finzi.

In 1995, the second known performance of the quartet, by the Almeira Quartet, using a performing edition created by Michael Allis and published by Fentone Music took place; this was followed shortly afterwards by a performance by students of the Royal Academy of Music.

The first recording of the quartet, paired with his 1884 string quintet, was made by EM Records in 2013.

== Structure ==
The composition is in four movements:

1. Allegro
2. Andante
3. Allegro molto
4. Allegro moderato

A typical performance take around 32 minutes.
