= Notepad+ =

Text editor for Windows

Notepad+ is a freeware text editor for Windows operating systems and is intended as a replacement for the Notepad editor installed by default on Windows. It has more formatting features but, like Notepad, works only with plain text. It can open text files of any size, and a single instance of the program can have multiple files open simultaneously. It supports dragging and dropping text within a file and between files, and supports multiple fonts and colours.

Notepad+ is available from the company RogSoft. It was developed by Dutch programmer Rogier Meurs. It was first released in 1996. Originally, it had the advantage of being able to open files of any size, because until 2000 Notepad could not open files larger than 64 KB.

== See also ==
- Notepad++
- List of text editors
- Comparison of text editors
