= Cello Sonata (Parry) =

The Sonata for Violoncello and Piano in A major by Hubert Parry is a sonata for cello and piano composed between 1879 and 1880 but not published until 1883.

Hubert Parry began work on the Cello Sonata in 1879 shortly after he completed his Piano Quartet. Intended for French cellist Jules-Bernard Lasserre, the work was not finished until early 1880. Despite a successful premiere on 12 February 1880, Parry was dissatisfied with the work and revised it extensively before publication by Novello in 1883 with a dedication to Lasserre.

== Structure ==
The composition is in three movements:

1. Allegro
2. Andante
3. Maestoso – Allegro

A typical performance take around 25 minutes.
