= Scratchpad =

Scratchpad may refer to:

- A pad of paper, such as a notebook, for preliminary notes, sketches, or writings
- Scratchpad memory, also known as scratchpad, scratchpad RAM or local store, is a high-speed internal memory used for temporary storage of calculations, data, and other work in progress
- Scratchpad, the former name of Axiom, a free, general-purpose computer algebra system
