= Scratch Messiah =

Informal performance of Handel's Messiah

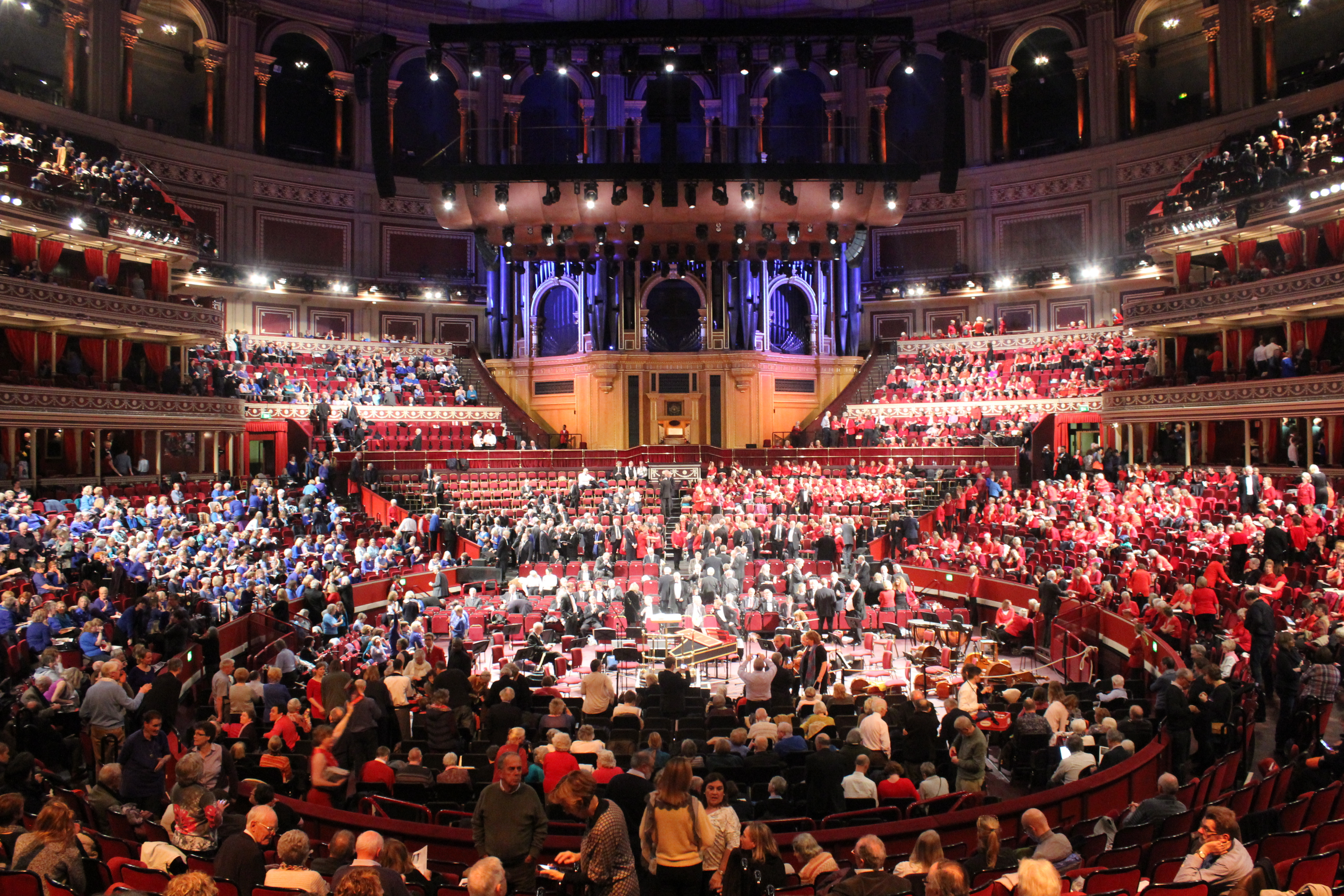
Scratch Messiah, Royal Albert Hall 2015

A Scratch Messiah, People's Messiah, Come Sing Messiah, Sing-it-yourself Messiah, Do-it-yourself Messiah (DIY Messiah), or Sing along Messiah (the first two British and Australian usage, the last three common in North America) is an informal performance of Handel's Messiah in which the audience serves as the unrehearsed chorus, often supported by a carefully prepared core group. Orchestra and soloists are usually professionals, though their services are often donated for charity benefits. The "scratch" name derives from the idea of cooking or building from scratch.

== History ==
The Great Handel Festival at The Crystal Palace, 1857

Scratch Messiah performances have their origins in the British tradition of choral societies, when large choruses of untrained amateur singers could participate in performances of large-scale concert works. Handel's Messiah was originally composed with charitable purposes in mind, having grown out of the 1749 performance of the Foundling Hospital Anthem and Handel's annual Easter performance of Messiah in the chapel of the Foundling Hospital in London. Messiah was composed so that it could be performed after a limited number of rehearsals, and thus lent itself well to the large Handel Festivals held from the 1820s onwards in Birmingham, Manchester, Liverpool and London. At these gatherings, large, amateur "scratch" choirs were formed from members of the public who travelled to the cities from all over Britain.

== Performances ==
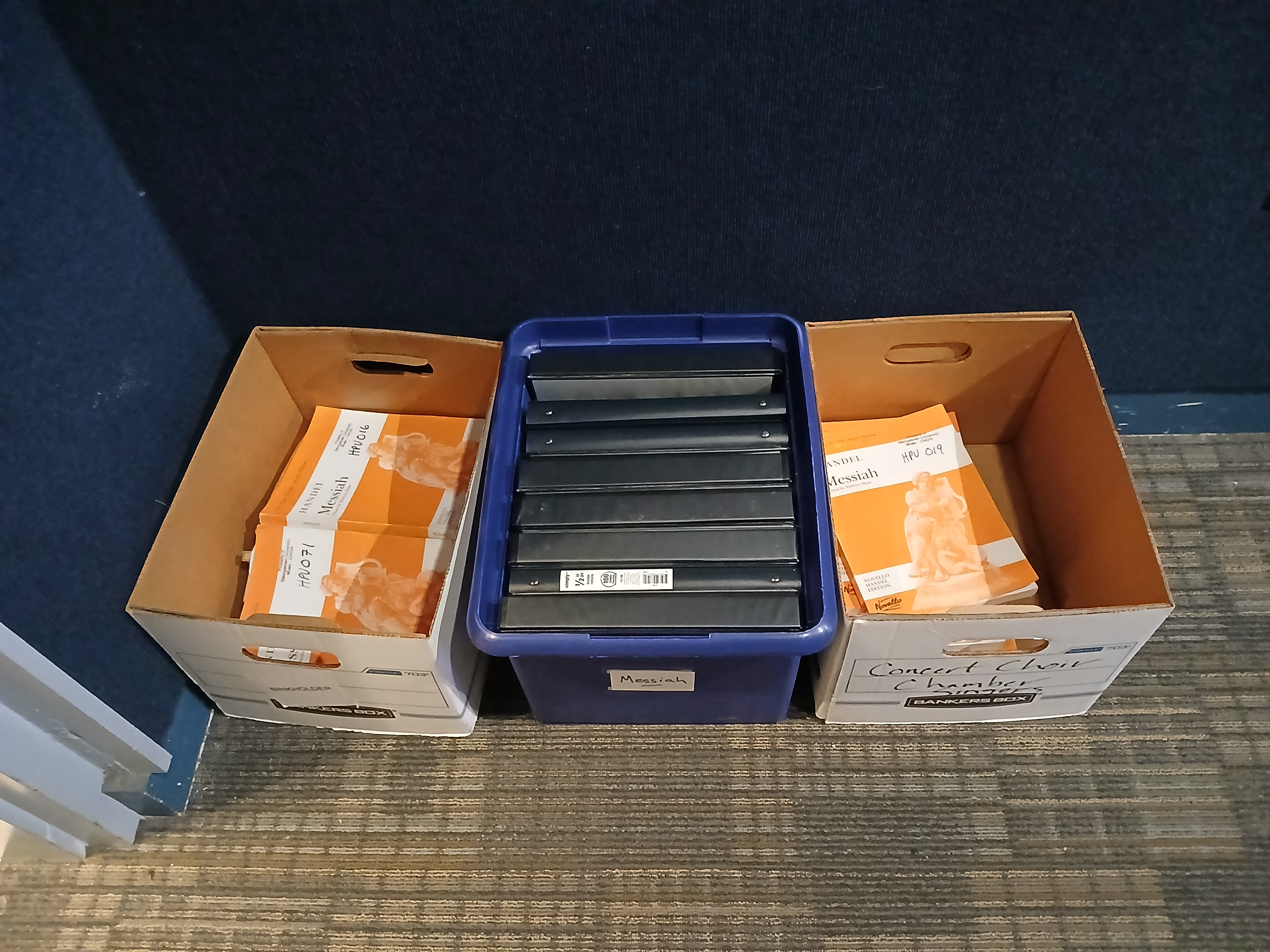
Extra copies of the score provided to audience members during a performance at Georgetown University in 2024

Such performances have become a tradition among music lovers in the English-speaking world, especially around Christmas time, and appear to be developing a following in the Netherlands and China as well. Often a "Sing-along Messiah" is organised in a concert hall or church, where a choir has rehearsed the music, but the public are invited to bring scores and join in. On a smaller scale, a Messiah party may take the form of a group of friends gathered around the piano in someone's home, and this is typically sung entirely a prima vista. Usually these are informal events, though occasionally there is a dress code: formal concert dress or even 18th century period costume. One example of a large-scale event is the "Do-It-Yourself Messiah" held in Chicago since 1976, organized by the International Music Foundation. It is held in the Harris Theater for Music and Dance. There is a volunteer orchestra and hired soloists, and the audience serves as the chorus. Similarly, CAMMAC in Canada organizes "Come! Sing Messiah" events. Avery Fisher Hall at Lincoln Center is another large-scale annual event, with professional orchestra and soloists. It uses nearly two dozen conductors chosen from various choirs in New York City, who each conduct one selection from the work. A similar event, among the first in the US, has been held in Lexington MA since 1962.

The largest regular performance in the UK, the "Messiah from Scratch", is held annually at the Royal Albert Hall, London. This event, which now attracts more than 3000 singers each year, was first held in 1974. From 1979 until 2009, the performance was conducted by Sir David Willcocks.

== See also ==
- Scratch Orchestra
- The dictionary definition of from scratch at Wiktionary
