= BlowUpRadio =

American internet radio station

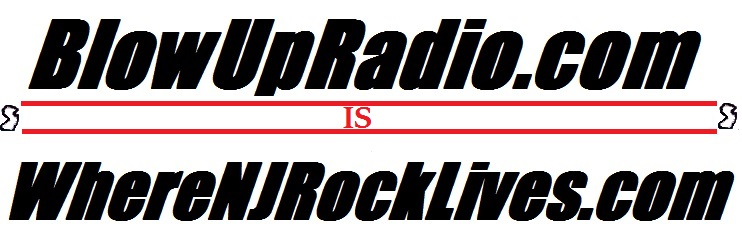
- Old Bridge, New Jersey; United States

Programming
- Language: English
- Format: Various

Ownership
- Owner: Lazlo

History
- First air date: December 15, 2000

Links
- Website: www.blowupradio.com

BlowUpRadio is an American internet radio station based in New Jersey.

== History ==
Lazlo is a former disc jockey from the rock music station WDHA. He founded BlowUpRadio on 15 December 2000. The Internet radio station showcases homegrown music from New Jersey, focusing predominately on unsigned artists. The station features playlists, interviews and live performances, and the website features newsletters and videos. Lazlo explains he created BlowUpRadio because "people actually care about hearing local bands," as a response to mainstream Jersey Rock Radio stations "playing an occasional Bruce Springsteen or Bon Jovi song." The Aquarian Weekly says "he concentrates all his efforts on local artists that are doing their absolute best to gain recognition in a field where recognition is fleeting."

Starting in 2006, BlowUpRadio started a benefit program called Banding Together, a benefit show to help those who suffer from spondylitis, with proceeds going to the Spondylitis Association of America. The show is held over several days as a virtual festival, and mostly features acoustic live over-the-air sets from Lazlo's apartment, and occasionally recorded sets from bands performing at venues. Some prominent artist performances include Richard Barone, the Accelerators, Lost in Society and Val Emmich.

The tenth anniversary of BlowUpRadio was held at Buddies in Sayreville, New Jersey, with performances by Cropduster, Tea & Whiskey and Mike Ferraro and the Young Republicans. The station temporarily stopped broadcasting on 31 January 2016, after a two-day "Blowing Up the Radio!" broadcast that featured in-studio performances by some of the Jersey artists that the station championed over the years. In a press release, Lazlo says "I am already hard at work on the next phase of how BlowUpRadio.com will continue to promote New Jersey's indie music scene." BlowUpRadio returned broadcasting 14 March 2017.

== Interviews ==
As of 2018, BlowUpRadio has held over two-hundred interviews with local and national artists, typically lasting between thirty and sixty minutes. The interviews are interspersed with studio recordings, and live performances.

- 18th & Addison
- Jon Anderson
- Asphalt Grey
- Chris Barron
- Beatallica
- Black Wine
- Mike Brenner
- The Clydes
- Cosmo Jarvis
- D. J. Bonebrake
- Dub Proof
- Adam Duritz
- Val Emmich
- Fairmont
- God Street Wine
- Brendan Hall
- Colin Hay
- Hero Pattern
- Will Hoge
- Hostage Calm
- The Howlin' Brothers
- Charlie Hunter
- Lloyd Kaufman
- Kava Kava
- Larry and His Flask
- Phil Leavitt
- Lionize
- Lost In Society
- Marcy Playground
- MC Lars
- Tris McCall
- Moving Units
- Johnette Napolitano
- The Porchistas
- Queensrÿche
- Paul Rosevear
- Patti Rothberg
- Neil Sabatino
- Sacha Sacket
- Rachael Sage
- Savoir Adore
- Paul Sanchez
- Matt Sorum
- George Stanford
- Bobby Steele
- Ember Swift
- Jim Testa
- They Might Be Giants
- Tub Ring
- Brian Vander Ark
- Dave Wakeling
- Wheatus
- Ben Wilson

== Discography ==
Beginning in 2017, BlowUpRadio releases Rock Against Hate compilation albums that contain original songs, to raise money for Planned Parenthood, The Trevor Project and Kids in Need of Defense. Coinciding with the charity albums is a live webathon containing performances and discussions on activism, social issues or protest.

- Rock Against Hate Vol. 1 (2017)
- Rock Against Hate Vol. 2 (2018)
- Rock Against Hate Vol. 3 (2019)
