= Radio Disney's The Next Big Thing =

- Genre: Contest
- Country of origin: United States
- Home station: Radio Disney
- Original release: November 2008 – 2020

Radio Disney's Next Big Thing (also known by the initials NBT) was a singing contest broadcast on Radio Disney that first launched in November 2008. The contest took place over 10 weeks, with new and unsigned artists or bands competing every two weeks. Radio listeners could then vote for the singer or band of their choice to progress in the contest, with the overall winner being announced at the contest's end.

Singing duo Jonnie and Brookie won the show's first season in May 2009.

Season two of Next Big Thing began in late 2009 and was won by Jasmine Sagginario from Franklin, Tennessee.

Season three began in 2010 and was won by Kicking Daisies, with Shealeigh winning season four in 2011.

Season Five began on October 12, 2012, and featured four solo singers and one singing duo competing for an appearance on the Disney Channel series Austin & Ally, the chance to have a single released through the Disney Music Group, and to open for the Next Big Thing finale concert in Los Angeles. The competitors for the fifth season were Chloe and Halle Bailey, Jack Skuller, Katherine Hughes, Elle Winter, and Damian Otchere. Chloe and Halle were declared the winners on December 8, 2012.

== Original Style NBT: Contest for Unknown Artists (2008 - 2012) ==
The original NBT contest featured 5 unsigned and unknown artists for each season, with the exception of season 1, which featured 10. The artists gain exposure by performing, doing interviews and getting airtime on Radio Disney and Disney Channel. The winner of NBT would then be chosen through online polling.

Contestants

Season 1 (2008/2009): 10 total artists including,

- Sarah Solovay
- Push Play
- Katie Lawhorne
- Kacie Lynch
- Danielle Thrush
- Comic Book Heroes
- Bre Morgan
- Allstar Weekend (formerly ‘ALLSTAR’)
- Jonnie and Brookie (winner)

Season 2 (2009/2010): 5 artists

- Josh Golden
- Cymphonique Miller
- Kropp Circle
- Jasmine Sagginario (winner)
- Gabi Wilson

Season 3 (2010/2011): 5 artists

- Sacha Edwards
- Matthew Johnson
- Coco Jones
- Amber Lilly
- Kicking Daisies (winner)

Season 4 (2011): 5 artists

- Shealeigh Voitl (winner)
- Zack Montana
- Ladina Spence
- Hollywood Ending (2008-2015)
- Tay Barton

Season 5 (2012): 5 artists

- Jack Skuller
- Katherine Hughes
- Elle Winter
- Damian Otchere
- Chloe and Halle Bailey (winner)

== New Format: Promo for Established Artists (2013 - 2020) ==
In 2013, Radio Disney started a new format for NBT, in the form of a promotional show where a single "featured artist" was highlighted, in lieu of a talent contest. Said featured artist was already signed to a record label and getting some airplay on Radio Disney as well as other stations, very much unlike NBT artists of the past, who were unsigned and had no media exposure. The featured artist would be promoted through different videos and media across the Radio Disney network as well as on the Disney Channel. Each artist was featured for a few months before moving on to a new artist. This has no resemblance to the original NBT, other than the same name and logo.

1st artist (2013):

- Fifth Harmony

2nd artist (2013/2014):

- R5

3rd artist (2014):

- Becky G

4th artist (2014):

- The VAMPS

5th artist (2014/2015):

- Shawn Mendes

6th artist (2015):

- Olly Murs

7th artist (2015):

- Bea Miller

8th artist (2015)

- Jacob Whitesides

9th artist (2015/2016)

- Kelsea Ballerini

10th artist (2016):

- Sofia Carson

11th artist (2016):

- Jordan Fisher

12th artist (2016):

- Alessia Cara

13th artist (2016/2017):

- Runaway June

14th artist (2017):

- Skylar Stecker

15th artist (2017):

- Camila Cabello

16th artist (2017/2018):

- Why Don't We

17th artist (2018):

- Jagmac

18th artist (2018/2019):

- Anne-Marie

19th artist (2019):

- Lennon Stella

20th artist (2019):

- Meg Donnelly

21st artist (2019):

- Gabby Barrett

22nd artist (2019/2020):

- 2XO (final)
