= Jonnie and Brookie =

American pop rock duo

- Origin: San Diego, California, US
- Genre: Pop rock
- Years active: 1998–present
- Labels: iShine Records; Bema Media; Provident Label Group
- Members: Jonnie Allen; Brookie (Brooke) Allen
- Website: Official website

Jonnie and Brookie are an American pop rock duo originating from Gilbert, Arizona. The group is best known for winning the Disney N.B.T. (Next Big Thing) contest in 2009 and performing at the Disney Channel Summer at Seas concert tour.

== Beginning (1998–2001) ==
Sisters Jonnie and Brookie Allen began creating and performing music at ages 5 and 3, respectively. It was then that they created the group, Jonnie and Brookie, and began performing shows and concerts across the United States. The group's debut holiday album, titled No Snow for Christmas, was released independently in December 2000. Jonnie was 7 years old and Brookie was 5.

== Media and touring (2009–present) ==
In 2009, Jonnie and Brookie entered the Radio Disney N.B.T. (Next Big Thing) competition. During that time, the group was chosen to perform at the Disney Channel Summer at Seas tour. Other performers on the tour were Tiffany Thornton, Mitchel Musso, Debby Ryan, Alyson Stoner, Jason Earles, Jason Dolley and Nicole Gale Anderson. Sometime later, the group won the N.B.T. (Next Big Thing) competition.

In 2009, the group was chosen to be a featured artist on Trinity Broadcasting Network's iShine KNECT, a Christian tween show hosted by Paige Armstrong. In 2010, after the departure of Jasmine, Jonnie and Brookie performed the show's new theme song, which is still featured today in the show's second season.

In 2011, Jonnie and Brookie continued to expand their fan base through the internet with YouTube. In June 2011, the duo created a new YouTube channel titled "TheJonnieandBrookie" that featured professionally created covers of popular artists such as Taylor Swift, Justin Bieber, One Direction, and Katy Perry.

In early 2012, they left iShine KNECT as they were not re-cast for season 4 for unknown reasons.

In 2012, Jonnie and Brookie continued to release covers by popular artists, while releasing four new singles: "Perfect Mine", "Sell Out", "When I Hear a Love Song" and "Hands Down".

In 2013, the group released covers by David Guetta and Robyn, also releasing a new single called "Talk About Love". They also performed at the NAMM music show.

== Members ==
=== Current members ===
- Jonnie Allen – vocals, guitar (born March 14, 1992)
- Brookie Allen – vocals, bass, additional guitar, keyboard (born June 11, 1994)

== Discography ==
Released	Title	Label(s)
December 2000	No Snow for Christmas	independent
April 2002	Let Freedom Ring	independent
2004	Make a Difference	independent
2005	Just Having Fun	independent
2007	What Girls Like	independent
September 2, 2008	For Better	iShine Records
November 21, 2009	This One's for You	iShine Records
October 11, 2010	Love Is Calling	iShine Records
November 2012	Until Next Time	independent
