= Josh Golden =

American singer-songwriter

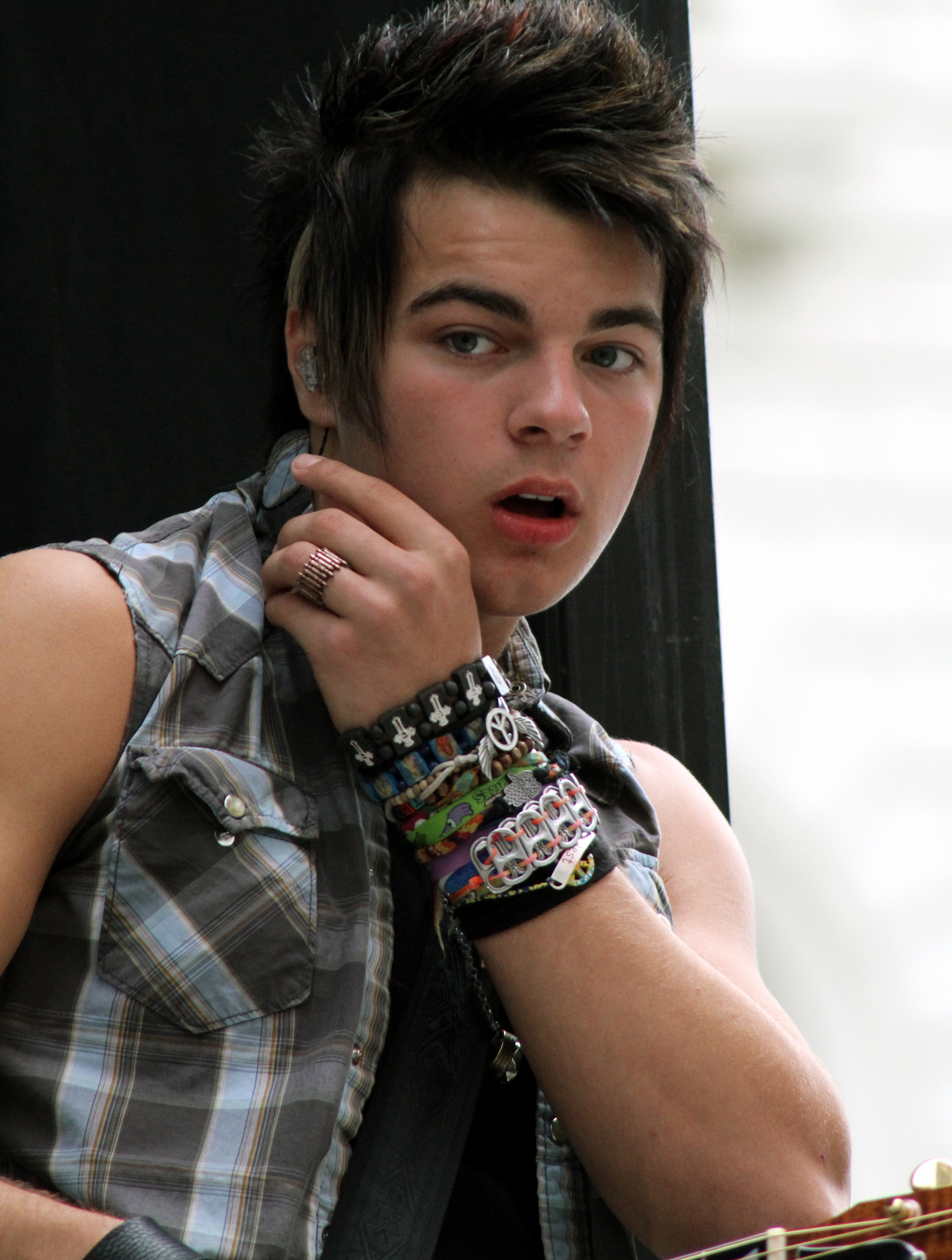
- Josh Golden during his Herald Square appearance in New York City

Background information
- Born: August 4, 1994 (age 31); Chesterfield, St. Louis County, Missouri
- Years active: 2008–present
- Label: Artist Partner Group

Josh Golden (born August 4, 1994) is an American singer-songwriter from St. Louis, Missouri.

== Career ==
Golden launched his musical career on the internet, posting his music videos on YouTube and Myspace starting 2008. In July 2009, he released his first self-published album titled Josh Golden.

In late 2009, Golden competed in the Season 2 of Radio Disney's The Next Big Thing, hosted by Sonny With A Chance star Tiffany Thornton. He competed against Jasmine, Cymphonique Miller, H.E.R. (Gabriella Wilson) and the band Palaye Royale (known as Kropp Circle then). In 2017, Golden began releasing music through AWAL under the artist name GOLDN including a 2019 project titled happysad.

Golden recently signed to Artist Partner Group, releasing his first track, Violets, under the artist name Josh Golden. He also featured on KYLE’s single But Cha.
