= Ladybirds (band) =

American pop rock band

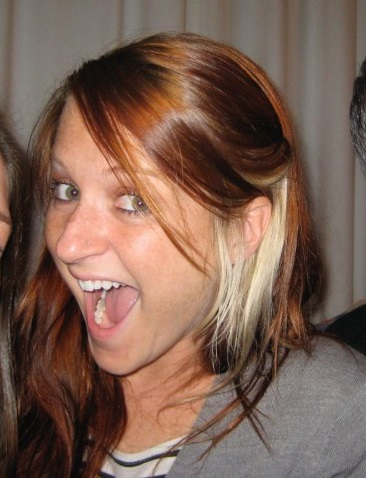
- Teeter Sperber of Ladybirds, in 2011.

Background information
- Origin: West Chester, Pennsylvania, U.S.
- Genres: Pop rock, electro, indie
- Years active: 2005–2007
- Labels: Creep, Mint 400
- Past members: Tyler Pursel; Teeter Sperber
- Website: myspace.com/weareladybirds

Ladybirds (stylized as LadybiRdS) were an American pop rock band from West Chester, Pennsylvania.

== History ==
Prior to Ladybirds, Tyler Pursel and Teeter Sperber were recording and touring with Ley Royal Scam, a short-lived group that had a successful run opening several shows for Taking Back Sunday at the Bamboozle festival in 2005. They also self-released two demos, titled Pregnancy Scare and Sophomore Slump. Within that year, the members of Ley Royal Scam separated, which allowed Pursel to rejoin Gym Class Heroes.

In 2006, Pursel contacted Sperber to provide vocals for a new project; what would become Ladybirds. Musical arrangements were made by Pursel, who was working on the East coast of the United States, while Sperber had relocated to Oregon, after the breakup of Ley Royal Scam. Though Pursel initially envisioned the album to feature many vocalists, subsequent work with Sperber led them to write and record together exclusively, making Sperber the lead singer of Ladybirds. Production culminated in January 2007, when Pursel and Sperber put the finishing touches on Regional Community Theater at a Creep Records basement studio in Pennsylvania. The album was released by Creep Records on September 18, 2007.

Promoted as "cheezpop" in the Ladybirds press release, the compositions of Regional Community Theater were likened to the Postal Service, while Sperber's singing drew comparison to Cyndi Lauper. Adam Bunch of PopMatters describes the album as "a sugar-coated, dance-happy record of electronic squiggles and bleeps." Appearing on the album are several lead vocalists; the Get Up Kids' Matt Pryor on "Cooper, Thanks for the Birds", Danger O's' Justin Johnson, and Fairmont's Neil Sabatino. Additionally, Max Bemis of Say Anything lends vocals on "Maxim and the Headphone Life", a song described by The Fader's Meyiee Apple as "one of the more memorable tracks" on Regional Community Theater. A music video for the song "The Brown and Red Divide" was released in June 2007.

== Personnel ==
- Tyler Pursel – arrangements
- Teeter Sperber – vocals

== Discography ==
Albums

- Regional Community Theater (2007)
