= 1967 (disambiguation) =

1967 was a common year starting on Sunday of the Gregorian calendar.

1967 may also refer to:

- 1967 (number), the natural number following 1966 and preceding 1968
- "1967" (song), a song by Tom Robinson
- 1967 (Mint 400 Records album), a compilation album
- 1967 (James Taylor album)
- "1967" (Our Friends in the North), a television episode
