= The Way She Loves Me =

The Way She Loves Me may refer to:

- "The Way She Loves Me", a 1994 song by Richard Marx from Paid Vacation
- "The Way She Loves Me", a 2015 song by What's Eating Gilbert from That New Sound You're Looking For
