= Regional Community Theater =

Studio album by Ladybirds
- Released: September 18, 2007
- Genres: Pop rock, dance-pop
- Length: 36:33
- Labels: Creep, Mint 400
- Producer: Tyler Pursel

Regional Community Theater is the debut studio album from the American pop duo Ladybirds.

== Background ==
=== Recording ===
After the breakup of Ley Royal Scam in 2006, Tyler Pursel returned to working with Gym Class Heroes and writing dance-pop music on the side, while Teeter Sperber relocated to Oregon. When composing, Pursel originally intended for many vocalists to be featured on the album, however, contacting his former band-mate Sperber to sing one of the tracks ultimately led Pursel to ask Sperber to sing the entirety of Regional Community Theater. Most of the album was arranged while Pursel and Sperber were in different regions of the United States, but by January 2007, they joined at a Creep Records basement studio in West Chester, Pennsylvania to put the final touches on Regional Community Theater. Tyler Pursel is credited as producer. The album was released on September 18, 2007, on Creep Records on compact disc and digital download. Regional Community Theater was reissued by Mint 400 Records digitally on July 5, 2011.

=== Album title ===
While in post-production, Sperber was singing "How can we be the best, yet be failing all the time?" for the title track, which elicited uproarious laughter from Pursel. In a Billboard interview, she explains "I sang the word "best," like a total, unabashed thespian spazz, arms raised to the sky, channeling my very best Bernadette Peters [and] once we composed ourselves I said, "Geez Ty, I am so sorry for getting all Regional Community Theater on your ass" to which he said "It's okay, Teet, as long as that can be the title of our record."

== Content ==
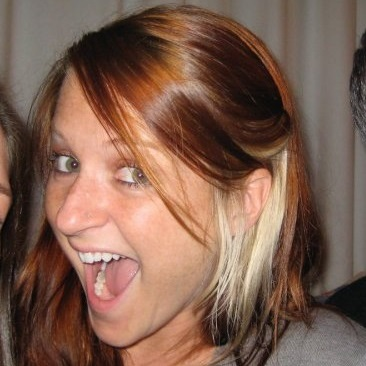
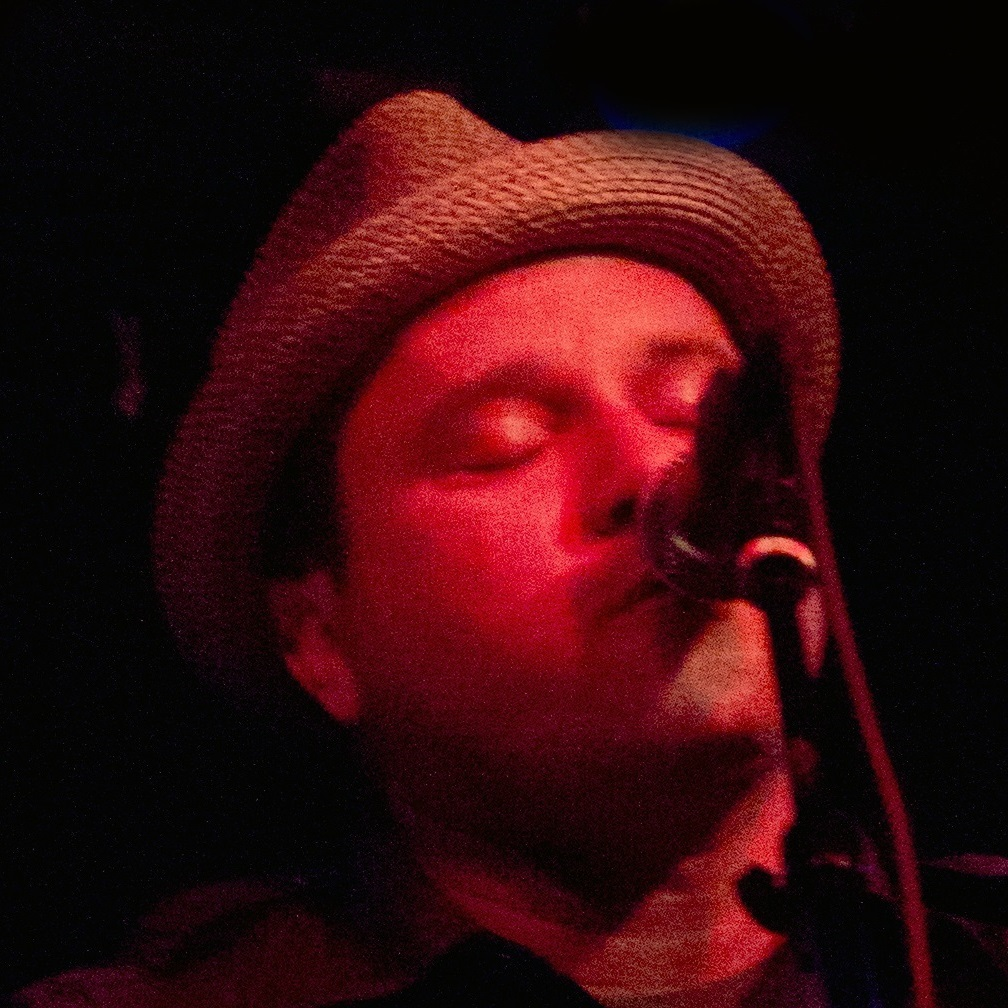
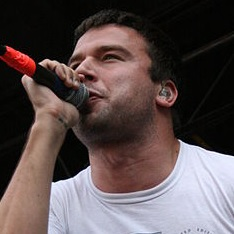
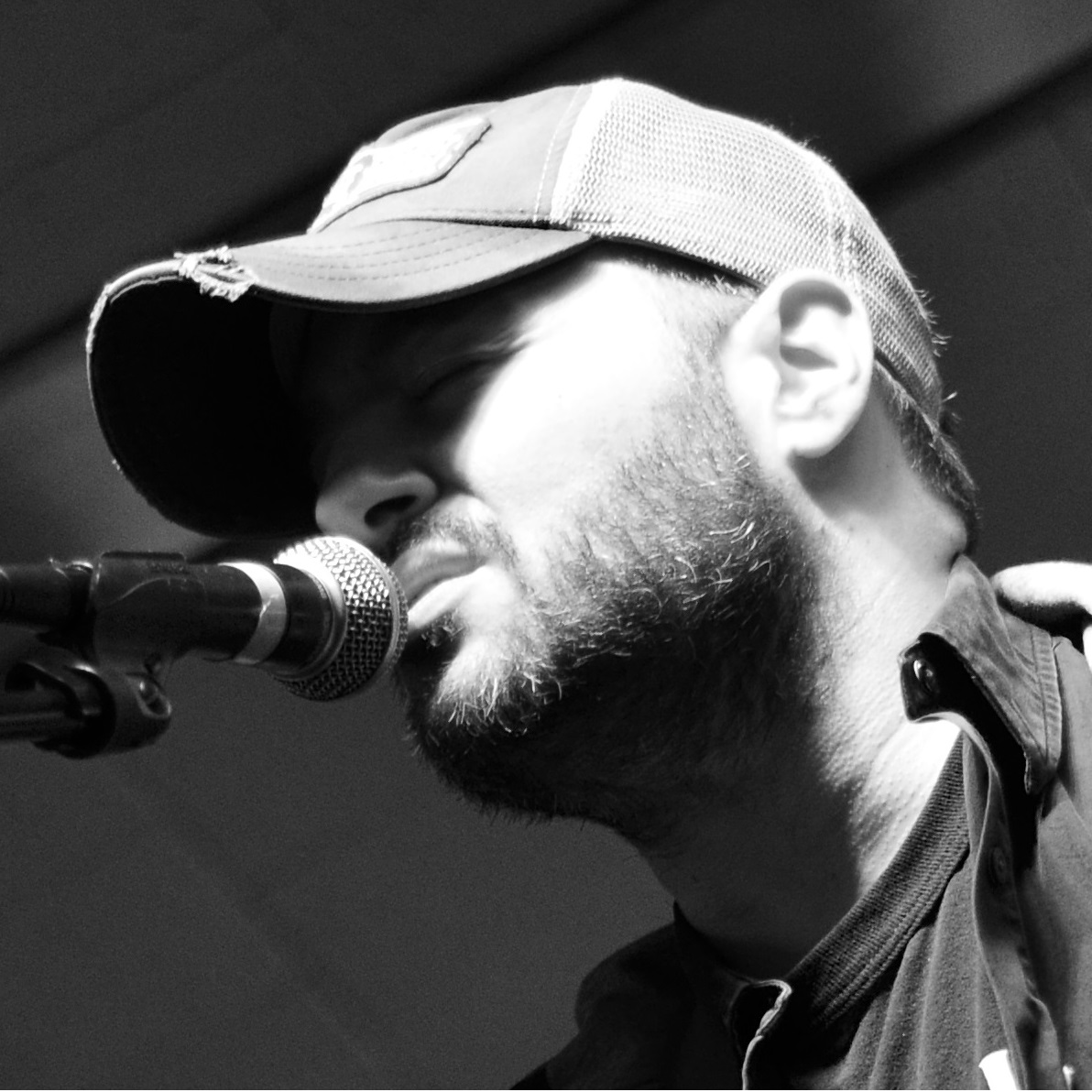
Vocalists on Regional Community Theater, Teeter Sperber, Matt Pryor, Max Bemis and Neil Sabatino.

Regional Community Theater is an eleven track album of dance-pop, described by Corey Apar of Spin as a "Nintendo version of Candyland, where eight-bit blurps, shiny werps and ticks, and apple-colored synth beats entertain the whole way to Candy Castle." Lyrically, the album focuses on relationships; from friendship to romance. Several rock lead vocalists appear on Regional Community Theater; The Get Up Kids' Matt Pryor sings on "Cooper, Thanks for the Birds" and Max Bemis of Say Anything sings on "Maxim and the Headphone Life." Additionally, Danger O's' Justin Johnson and Fairmont's Neil Sabatino appear on the album.

The opener "Slice Our Hands (We Are Blood Sisters)" is constructed with 8-bit music by Pursel. The second song, "Brown and Red Divide," was released as a single in June 2007, and accompanied by a music video. A children's chorus, the class of one of the Creep Records owner's daughters, sings the refrain on the love song "Andy Lex." On the title-track "Regional Community Theater," Max Bemis makes his first appearance assisting with vocals. The final song, "You Are The Torro King" is an instrumental track, which features distorted drums, dark synthesizers, vintage electro-accordion and bells.

== Reception ==
Professional ratings
Review scores
Source	Rating
AbsolutePunk	85%
AllMusic	4.5/5 stars
The Fader	Mixed
PopMatters	6/10

Reviews for Regional Community Theater were mixed to positive. Joe DeAndrea of AbsolutePunk gave a favorable review, noting the "superb" list of guest vocalists and calling it "overall a very fun listen." Similarly, in an AllMusic review Jo-Ann Greene applauds the album, saying "..so upbeat is the music, that inevitably the characters have no choice but to make peace." She goes on to explain that Regional Community Theater "work[s] on two levels, enchanting the kids whilst simultaneously capturing the imagination of adults."

In a mixed review in The Fader, Meiyee Apple likens Sperber's vocals to Hilary Duff, and calls the album "cute electro-pop[,] if you like being sung to by a baby, and you are an actual baby." Sharing the same sentiment in a PopMatters review, Adam Bunch describes Regional Community Theater as a mostly straightforward album, but admires the moments of variety such as children’s choir (in "Andy Lex") and pitch-shifted vocals. However, Apple acknowledges Ladybirds admission of their "sticky sweet sound," saying that they do a "good job [in the] department of mindless fun."

== Track listing ==
No.	Title	Length
1.	"Slice Our Hands (We Are Blood Sisters)"	2:51
2.	"The Brown and Red Divide"	3:26
3.	"Andy Lex"	3:37
4.	"Regional Community Theater"	3:02
5.	"Lady of Travel and Leisure"	3:27
6.	"Maxim and the Headphone Life"	2:53
7.	"All Love for the Oregon Coast"	3:28
8.	"Shark Party"	3:54
9.	"Oh No! The Unicorns Are Knife Fighting Again"	3:03
10.	"Cooper, Thanks for the Birds"	4:00
11.	"You Are the Torro King"	2:52
Total length:		36:33

== Personnel ==
Ladybirds

- Tyler Pursel – arrangements
- Teeter Sperber – vocals

Additional musicians

- Max Bemis – vocals on "Regional Community Theater" and "Maxim and the Headphone Life"
- Matt Pryor – vocals on "Cooper, Thanks for the Birds"
- Justin Johnson – vocals on "Shark Party"
- Neil Sabatino – vocals on "Lady of Travel and Leisure"
