= The Next Me =

The Next Me may refer to:

- The Next Me (EP), a 2011 EP by Aaron Yan
- The Next Me (album), a 2009 album by Jasmine
