= Destruction Creation =

Studio album by Fairmont
- Released: November 2, 2010
- Genres: Pop rock, indie rock
- Length: 34:00
- Label: Mint 400
- Producer: Neil Sabatino

Fairmont chronology
The Meadow at Dusk (2009)	Destruction Creation (2010)	The Grand and Grandiose (2013)

Destruction Creation is the sixth studio album from the American rock band Fairmont.

== Content ==
The ten-track album was released on November 2, 2010, by Mint 400 Records. On recording for the Destruction Creation, vocalist Neil Sabatino explains in Jersey Beat that they were originally "going to engineer 100 percent of the recording and just have Bryan Russell mix the record [because] we had done three records now all while holding hands with this amazing producer, but felt it was time to let go and try it all on our own." He also notes that "I wanted the theme of the artwork and the music on the album to reflect a real DIY homemade record and I think we accomplished that." It was recorded over the course of seventy hours, in a small cabin in Lynn, Pennsylvania.

Conceptually, Destruction Creation has motifs of bitterness, betrayal and disillusionment. In an interview with BlowUpRadio, Sabatino explains the title comes from a character in the comedy film, I Heart Huckabees, who chants "destruction, creation." The album cover is hand sewn.

== Reception ==
A review in The Aquarian Weekly calls Destruction Creation a "strong confident, self-assured, commercially accessible effort from an outstanding young band just beginning to hit its creative stride." The track "Oh Your Bitter Heart" is described by New Jersey Stage columnist Bob Makin as "a jangly upbeat-sounding break-up song featuring sweet female harmony and backing vocals that [make the] understated angry lyrics seem creepy."

== Track listing ==
No.	Title	Length
1.	"Liar"	4:15
2.	"Lucky Boy, Lucky Girl"	2:57
3.	"No Good Deed Goes Unpunished"	3:41
4.	"Oh Your Bitter Heart"	3:22
5.	"Ocean"	4:11
6.	"In This House"	3:10
7.	"Friends Like You"	2:49
8.	"It's All About You"	3:11
9.	"You Haunt Me"	1:34
10.	"As The Sun Sets On Lonely Hills"	4:50
Total length:		34:00

== Personnel ==
- Andy Applegate – drums
- Sam Carradori – bass guitar and backing vocals
- Christian Kisala – keys
- Neil Sabatino – lead vocals and guitar

== Bibliography ==
- BlowUpRadio Staff (December 16, 2010), "Lazlo interviews Fairmont", BlowUpRadio
- Kundrath, Jay (December 30, 2010), "'Rath on Record: Fairmont", The Pop Break
- Makin, Bob (April 6, 2017), "Makin Waves with RocknRoll HiFives, Fairmont, Hub City Music Festival & more", New Jersey Stage
- Patch Staff (April 6, 2012), "The Porchistas and Cropduster four band showcase at Tierneys", Patch Media
- PRLog Staff (October 3, 2010), "Mint 400 Records Putting Together its own Label Showcase at Maxwell's Nov. 27th.", PRLog
- Sabatino, Neil (2012), "Home Recording in the Forest of Chaos", Jersey Beat
