= Shealeigh =

American singer (born 1998)

- Born: Shealeigh Noelle Voitl; March 29, 1998 (age 27); Winfield, Illinois, U.S.
- Genres: Pop; folk
- Occupation: Singer-songwriter
- Instrument: Piano
- Years active: 2008–present
- Website: www.shealeigh.com

Shealeigh Noelle Voitl (born March 29, 1998), known simply as Shealeigh, is an American singer-songwriter. She is best known for winning the fourth season of Radio Disney's N.B.T. (Next Big Thing) competition. In 2017, Shealeigh released her debut EP, We All Need to Go Places. In 2022, she returned with her sophomore EP, The Whole Sun Balancing Upon My Knees. She has written all her songs herself.

== Personal life ==
Shealeigh was born in Winfield, Illinois. She went to Hawk Hallow Elementary School, Eastview Middle School, Bartlett High School, and North Central College.

== Music career ==
In 2009, at the age of 11, Shealeigh won the fifth season of the YouTube singing competition Cree Ingles Idol Search (now called Cree Ingles YouTube Idol). Ellen DeGeneres spotted one of Shealeigh's videos on YouTube in 2010 and invited her to perform on The Ellen DeGeneres Show.

One year later, Shealeigh competed in the fourth season of Radio Disney's N.B.T. (Next Big Thing). On December 7, 2011, she won the competition with the song "What Can I Say". She released her first non-Disney single, "Strangely Beautiful", in 2012.

In 2017, Shealeigh released her debut EP, We All Need to Go Places, which was followed by a single called "Landline" in 2018.

Shealeigh released her next EP, The Whole Sun Balancing Upon My Knees, in 2022.

== Discography ==
=== Extended plays ===
Title	Details
We All Need to Go Places	Release: April 14, 2017; Format: Digital download (streaming)
The Whole Sun Balancing Upon My Knees	Release: February 25, 2022; Format: Digital download (streaming)

=== Singles ===
Title	Year	Album
"What Can I Say"	2011	Radio Disney's N.B.T Season 4 – The Singles
"Spotlight"	2011	Radio Disney's N.B.T Season 4 – The Singles
"Strangely Beautiful"	2012	Non-album single
"Be Kind"	2013	Non-album promotional single
"Darlin'"	2015	
"Loverboy"	2017	We All Need to Go Places
"Landline"	2018	
"Here Again"	2022	The Whole Sun Balancing Upon My Knees
