= That New Sound You're Looking For =

Studio album by What's Eating Gilbert
- Released: July 10, 2015
- Recorded: January 2014
- Genre: Power pop
- Length: 31:37
- Label: Hopeless
- Producers: Jon Howard, Chad Gilbert

What's Eating Gilbert chronology
Solid Gold Hits (2013)	That New Sound You're Looking For (2015)

Singles from That New Sound You're Looking For
- 1. "You're the Most" Released: June 2, 2015

That New Sound You're Looking For is the only studio album by What's Eating Gilbert, a solo project of Chad Gilbert.

== Background and recording ==
What's Eating Gilbert began in Los Angeles in 2009 as a solo project of New Found Glory guitarist Chad Gilbert. Despite Gilbert being busy with New Found Glory, What's Eating Gilbert released three EPs in 2010, following up with the Cheap Shots in 2012. According to the liner notes of Cheap Shots, What's Eating Gilbert consisted of Gilbert and Elgin James. In an interview with Alternative Press in September, What's Eating Gilbert consisted of Gilbert on vocals and guitar, Honor Nezzo on keyboard and vocals, Audelio Flores, Jr. of Set Your Goals on bass, and New Found Glory member Cyrus Bolooki on drums. In the same month, a music video was released for "Complaining", the aesthetic of which was "important to the introduction of this band". Also in September, What's Eating Gilbert went on a headlining tour with support from Tegan and Sara and Twin Forks. In October, the band supported Motion City Soundtrack and Bayside.

That New Sound You're Looking For was recorded in January 2014. It was produced by Gilbert and Jon Howard, who also acted as engineer. He was assisted by Mike McCreight. Gilbert performed all of the guitars and bass. Josh Colbert of Further Seems Forever contributed additional guitars, while Mikey Ambrose of Set Your Goals played drums. Kait DiBenedetto of 18th & Addison and H-Bomb sung backing vocals. In addition, DiBenedetto sung additional lead vocal on "You're the Most", while Hayley Williams of Paramore sung additional lead vocal on "Wearing Your Ring". Howard mixed the recordings at the Anchor Room. They were then mastered by Alan Douches.

== Release and reception ==
On May 7, 2015 it was announced that Gilbert's project had signed to Hopeless and that the label would release Gilbert's debut album. According to Gilbert, Hopeless wished to release the album when Gilbert could tour his side project. The next day, the artwork was released. On June 2, "You're the Most" was released as single. A day later, a music video was released for the song. The video was directed by Gilbert. On July 10, That New Sound You're Looking For was released through Hopeless. The album was advertised as a "nostalgic tribute to music of the 1950s and '60s." After being asked why it took so long for the album to be released, Gilbert replied that "New Found Glory [...] had an action-packed last year and a half" and waited "until I had some time off." On the same day, a lyric video was released for "Follow Her Around". The album's title is a reference to Back to the Future. In July, Gilbert supported Anthony Raneri of Bayside alongside Laura Stevenson and Allison Weiss on the Sorry State of Mind Tour.

AllMusic reviewer Timothy Monger said the release "sounds like a fairly straightforward power pop album". He noted that "it's a pleasant experiment that doesn't take itself too seriously." He ended with saying how Gilbert "has a knack for fun, catchy melodies, and this record has those in spades." Reviewing the album for the Daily Breeze, Sam Gnerre said it was full of "dozen smartly crafted, energetically rendered slices of power-pop". Although the album "comes close on occasion to too-cutesy-for-its-own-good territory" it rebounds with "crisply executed, irresistible songs". Gav Lloyd of Rock Sound noted that the music may have been influenced by Candy Hearts. Lloyd commented that Gilbert's lyrics about "feeling pretty loved-up [...] [Is] something that could [have been] sickly" for lesser-known bands. They have "taken the form of a collection of songs as fun as they are lovely."

== Track listing ==
All songs written by Chad Gilbert.

1. "You're the Most" – 2:58
2. "Follow Her Around" – 1:58
3. "The Way She Loves Me" – 2:36
4. "Who Do You Love" – 2:27
5. "A Song About Girls" – 2:56
6. "Show Off" – 2:02
7. "Recurring Dreams" – 2:22
8. "From the Start" – 2:47
9. "Bad Mood" – 2:19
10. "Ain't Been Happy with Me" – 3:03
11. "Miserable Without You" – 3:36
12. "Wearing Your Ring" – 2:33

== Personnel ==
Personnel per booklet.

What's Eating Gilbert

- Chad Gilbert – guitars, bass

Additional musicians

- Josh Colbert – additional guitars
- Mikey Ambrose – drums
- Kait DiBenedetto – backing vocals, additional lead vocal (track 1)
- H-Bomb – backing vocals
- Hayley Williams – additional lead vocal (track 12)

Production

- Chad Gilbert – producer
- Jon Howard – producer, engineer, mixing
- Mike McCreight – assistant engineer
- Alan Douches – mastering
- Kyle Crawford – art direction, design
- Alyson Coletta – photos
- Chad Sengstock – photos
- Steven Matview – photos
