= A Cat Named Murzik =

Studio album by Murzik
- Released: 1 May 2012
- Studio: Aladdin Studios
- Genre: Dark folk
- Length: 27:21
- Labels: Self-released, Mint 400 Records
- Producer: Bryan Steenerson

Murzik chronology
Into the Darkness (2009)	A Cat Named Murzik (2012)

A Cat Named Murzik is the fourth studio album from the American folk band Murzik.

== About ==
The eight-track album was self-released, on 1 May 2012. It was recorded at Aladdin Studios, mixed by Alex Proctor, and engineered and produced by Bryan Steenerson. It is described as having "romanticized soundscapes and dark poetic lyrics," and it draws comparison to the music of DeVotchKa, Gogol Bordello, Nick Cave, and Leonard Cohen. A Cat Named Murzik features accordion, mandolin, glockenspiels, and acoustic and electric guitars, with the baritone vocals.

A record released party was held at Cedar Cultural Center in Minneapolis, Minnesota, on 19 May 2012, with Bella Ruse. The album was reissued with Mint 400 Records in 2015.

A review by John Ziegler in Duluth News Tribune says, "combining the zestiness of gypsy swing with the somber tones of some Eastern European folk music[,] there's a definite minor key vibe that comingles with the lyrics' darker shades lending a very distinct flavor to A Cat Named Murzik." He describes the opening track "Poison Tears" as blending "a flamenco feel with driving percussion and featur[ing] an undulating middle section, following the first verses, that almost stops time."

== Track listing ==
No.	Title	Length
1.	"Poison Tears"	4:07
2.	"River of Love"	4:22
3.	"Saint Andreas"	1:59
4.	"Rain Falling Slowly"	4:57
5.	"The Encounter"	2:34
6.	"Lolita"	3:12
7.	"Zdrastvuy Love"	2:34
8.	"Heaven Will Stay"	3:36
Total length:		27:21

== Personnel ==
- Christopher Becknell – violin
- Alex Budrow – drums
- Ryan Pfeiffer – cello
- Nathan Simar – accordion
- Bryan Steenerson – vocals and guitar
- Darin Steenerson – bass

Additional musicians

- Jeremy Grace – piano
- Alex Proctor – bass
