= The Maravines =

American rock band

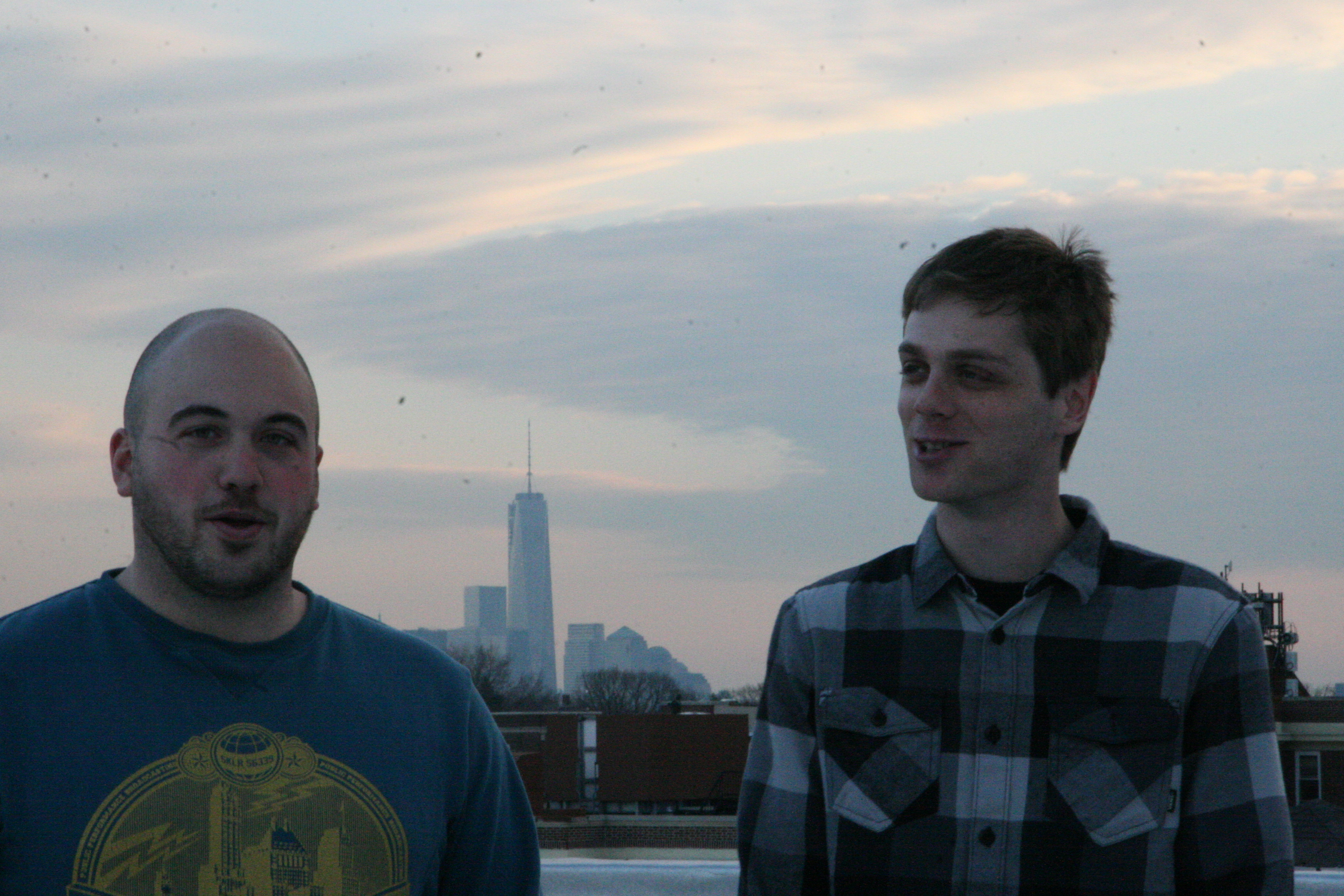

Background information
- Origin: Union City, New Jersey, U.S.
- Genres: Alternative rock, folk rock
- Years active: 2010–present
- Label: Mint 400 Records
- Members: Chris Lee; Evan Pope

The Maravines are an American rock band from New Jersey.

== History ==
The Maravines are a folk rock duo from Union City, New Jersey, that formed in 2010. They released Pearl independently in 2011. They are recognized for their lo-fi production, sullen harmonies, and reserved instrumental accompaniments, and draw comparison to the music of indie rock bands like the Shins and the Decemberists. Performing at the Stone Pony and many popular venues in New Brunswick, New Jersey let them develop a place in "the local [New Jersey] music scene."

=== Mint 400 Records ===
In 2013, they joined Mint 400 Records and released the ten-track album The Maravines. Distelfink was released in 2014, and the album charted on US college radio nationwide, spending several weeks in the "Top Songs And Albums Of The Week" at Gettysburg College's radio station WZBT, which is located nearby the Distelfink drive-in that appears on the cover.

In 2016, the Maravines released the eight-track album Sloan. They performed at the 2016 North Jersey Indie Rock Festival. In 2017, the Maravines self-released Dotty which features "slide guitar and lilting vocal melod[ies]." In 2018, they released the ten-track album Belmar.

The Maravines appear on several Mint 400 Records compilation albums such as Transformed: A Tribute to Lou Reed , 1967 where they perform a "true-to-form rootsy" arrangement of the Byrds "You Ain't Goin' Nowhere," and give "All Apologies" by Nirvana "the psychedelic treatment" on Mint 400 Records Presents Nirvana In Utero. They also appear on the Fairmont album 8½, sharing vocals with Neil Sabatino for the song "Gone."

== Members ==
- Chris Lee – vocals, guitar, bass and percussion
- Evan Pope – drums, guitar, vocals and bass

== Discography ==
Albums

- Pearl (2011)
- The Maravines (2013)
- Distelfink (2014)
- Bruce (2015)
- Sloan (2016)
- Dotty (2017)
- Belmar (2018)
- Covers (2019)

Compilations

- Acoustic Showcase (2015)

Appearing on

- Patchwork (2014)
- Rock the Lup: Volume V (2014)
- Transformed: A Tribute to Lou Reed (2014)
- 8½ (2015)
- 1967 (2015)
- Mint 400 Records Presents In a Mellow Tone (2015)
- The 3rd Annual 24 Hour Songwriting Challenge (2016)
- Mint 400 Records Presents Nirvana In Utero (2017)
