= The Bitter Chills =

American indie rock band

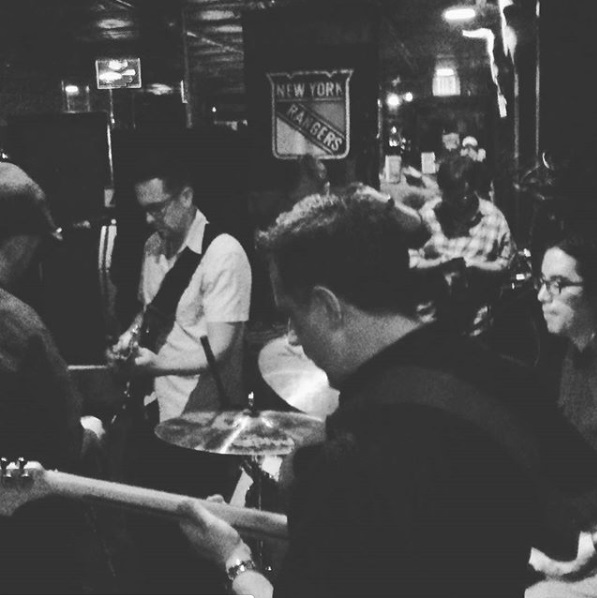
- The Bitter Chills at Stoshs, October 13, 2017

Background information
- Origin: North Jersey, U.S.
- Genres: Indie rock, folk rock
- Years active: 2011–present
- Label: Mint 400 Records
- Members: Tim Cesarano; Matt Cheplic; Pietro Ciliberto; Ed Fritz; Christian Kisala; Clint Morris
- Website: thebitterchills.com

The Bitter Chills are an American indie rock band from New Jersey.

== History ==
The Bitter Chills are a six-piece indie folk rock band from Northern New Jersey, that formed in 2011. They play Americana, folk rock and "roots pop." Prior to the Bitter Chills, Matt Cheplic released two solo albums, Don't Let Me Lose My Mind in 2001, and Who Burned the Book of Love, in 2008. The records received airplay on public and college radio stations, and Cheplic performed around the United States. He began playing with Pietro Ciliberto, as the group Crazy Morgan. Both were teachers at Roselle Catholic High School, and Cheplic notes in an interview with Jersey Beat, that "when I formed the band with Pete, part of the mantra for me was I wanted to do something with more of a sense of humor to it."

They released their first record, entitled Birth Of The Cold, in 2013, which is described as a low-fi acoustic album. Cheplic acknowledges inspiration for Birth Of The Cold from the music of The Beatles, Elvis Costello, Barenaked Ladies, and Johnny Cash.

=== Mint 400 Records ===
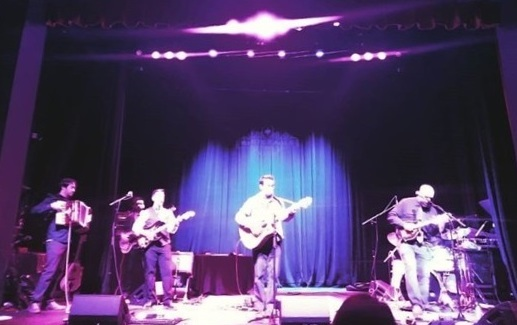
The Bitter Chills, opening for Keller Williams on March 1, 2018

The Bitter Chills signed with the independent label Mint 400 Records, in 2016. They released the single "Why Not Us?" that year, along with a music video, which was directed by Neil Sabatino. The Bitter Chills performed at the 2016 North Jersey Indie Rock Festival. On February 3, 2017, they released their second full-length album, entitled Feel-Good Songs for Feel-Bad People, also produced, mixed and mastered by Sabatino. The album contains "root music," that features mandolin, upright bass, accordion, piano and acoustic guitars.

For 'the compilation album At the Movies, the Bitter Chills do a rendition of "The Power of Love". The song "Nothing but Love, Unfortunately" appears on the compilation album NJ / NY Mixtape.

Matt Cheplic and Christian Kisala are also members of the indie rock group Fairmont. Matt Cheplic has a solo project titled Splendid Engine whose debut album "These Songs Will Destroy Us" was released in fall 2019".

== Members ==
- Tim Cesarano – bass guitar
- Matt Cheplic – vocals and guitar
- Pietro Ciliberto – mandolin and backing vocals
- Ed Fritz – accordion and piano
- Christian Kisala – drums
- Clint Morris – guitar

== Discography ==
Albums

- The Birth of the Cold (2013)
- Feel-Good Songs for Feel-Bad People (2016)
- Highway 21 (2021)

Appearing on

- At the Movies (2018)
- NJ / NY Mixtape (2018)
- At the Movies II (2021)
