= Tri-State (band) =

American rock band

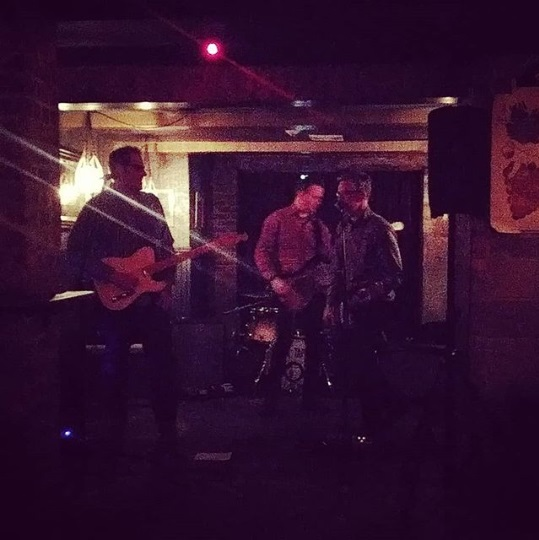
- Tri-State at Pet Shop in March 2018

Background information
- Origin: Maplewood, New Jersey, U.S.
- Genres: Indie rock
- Years active: 2010–present
- Label: Mint 400 Records
- Members: Julian Brash; Brady McNamara; Scott Stemmermann; Jeff Zelevansky

Tri-State is an American rock band from New Jersey.

== About ==
Tri-State is a four-piece jangle pop and indie rock band from Maplewood, New Jersey, that formed in 2010, consisting of vocalist and guitarist Julian Brash, drummer Brady McNamara, bassist and vocalist Scott Stemmermann and guitarist and vocalist Tom Lucas. Jeff Zelevansky (vocalist/guitarist) and Mason Rather (bass/vocals) were founding members of the band; both have since left the band. Tri-State's music is described as "jangle-pop" and "guitar-based rock'n'roll," and they draw comparison to the groups R.E.M., Dinosaur Jr., Eleventh Dream Day, and the artist Neil Young. They self-released the six-track EP, entitled Tri-State, on May 24, 2016. A review of the EP by Jim Testa in Jersey Beat says "this is a terrific record [...] that neatly draws inspiration from Nineties alterna-rock without sounding dated or derivative. The guitars rumble and roar, the drumming always keeps things moving forward, and the vocals and lyrics bring a perspective you just don't find in younger bands." Independent Clauses writes "Tri-State's tunes unfold in pleasing ways[,] creat[ing] an ominous mood that builds and builds," adding that "if you're into '90s indie-rock or mature songwriting that appreciates with multiple listens, give [Tri State] a spin." Tri-State signed with Mint 400 Records in 2014.

=== Mint 400 Records ===
That year they contributed the song "Take a Bow" for the compilation, Patchwork, and a rendition of "Carrie Anne" for the 2015 compilation, 1967. Tri-State released two singles "New Minuits" and "Titanic Brothers," on September 21, 2015. They performed at the 2016 North Jersey Indie Rock Festival. Their second EP, the five-track We Did What We Could Do, was released with Mint 400 Records, on October 22, 2016. Bob Makin of Courier News describes the EP as "pop hooks, vocal harmonies, driving beats, and intricate, intertwined guitars with intelligent [and] probing lyrics." It was listed in Jersey Beat's Top Local Releases" of 2016. The lead track "Summer Nun" appears on the compilation album, NJ / NY Mixtape. An EP entitled 'Doom Loop' was released in 2021, featuring the single 2021.

== Discography ==
LP

- "Hey Pal" (2019)

EPs

- Doom Loop (2021)
- Tri-State (2013)
- We Did What We Could Do (2016)

Singles

- "New Minuits / Titanic Brothers" (2015)

Appearing on

- Patchwork (2014)
- 1967 (2015)
- NJ / NY Mixtape (2018)
