= Attendre et Espérer =

- CD edition cover

Studio album by The Duke of Norfolk
- Released: November 2, 2018
- Genre: Folk music, indie music
- Length: 47:34
- Label: Mint 400

The Duke of Norfolk chronology
There is a Train (and a platform at either end) (2016)	Attendre et Espérer (2018)

Attendre et Espérer is the second studio album by the American folk musician the Duke of Norfolk.

== Content ==
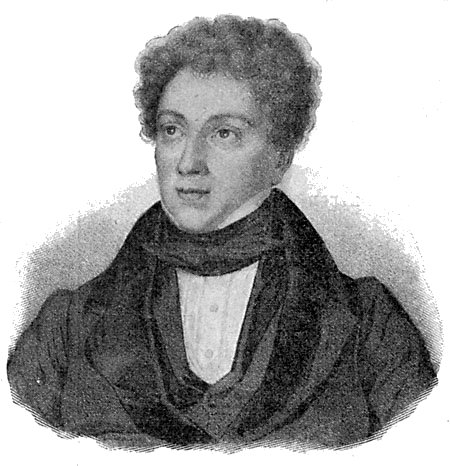
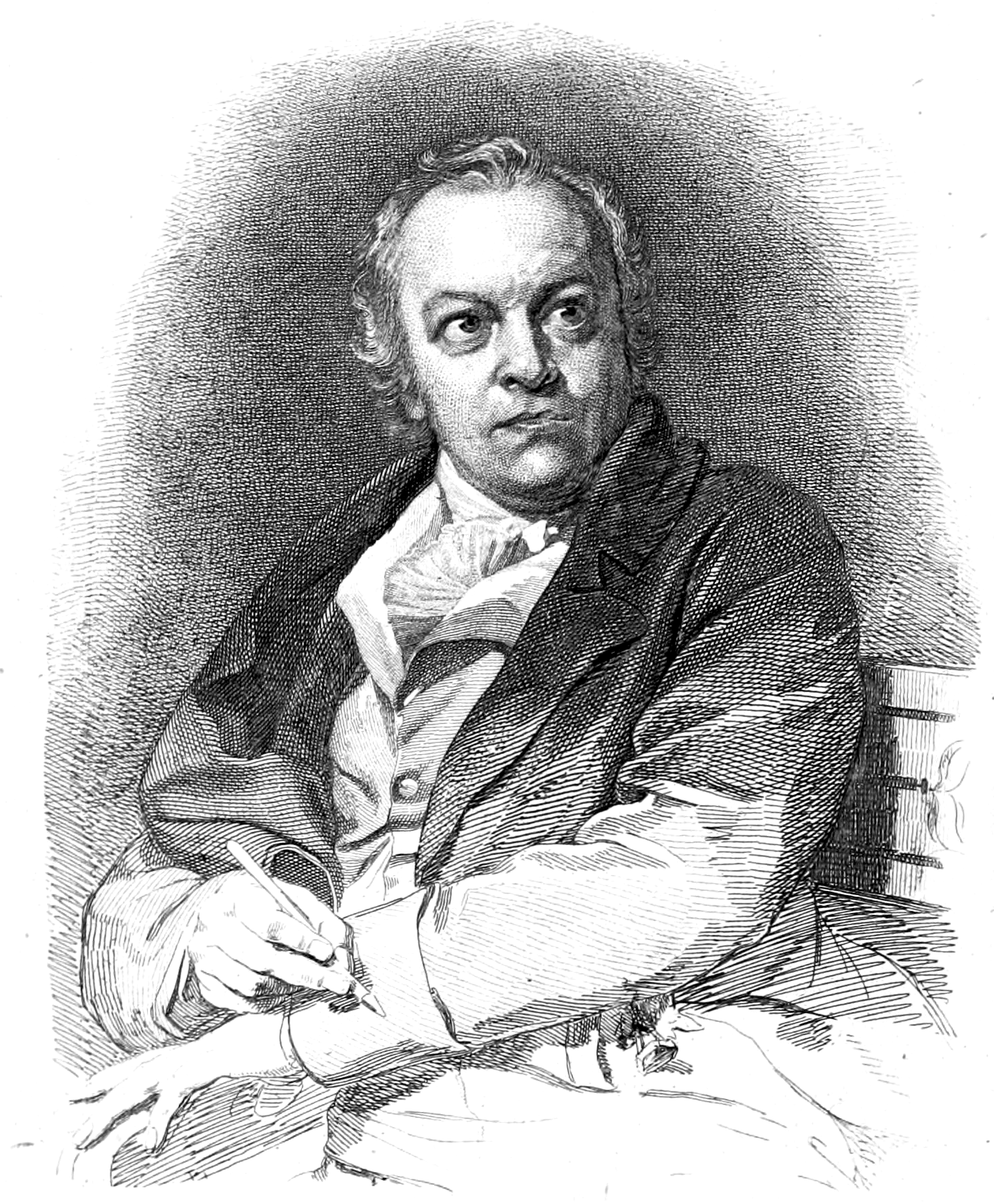
Attendre et Espérer draws inspiration from the literary works of Alexandre Dumas and William Blake.

The twelve-track album was on released on digital download with Mint 400 Records, on November 2, 2018, and was mastered by Adam Gonsalves at Telegraph Mastering. The compact disc issue is a handmade card sleeve made from recycled cardboard, with artwork that is derived from Thomas Moran's Entrance to the Grand Canal and Jean-Baptiste-Camille Corot's The Gypsies. Attendre et Espérer is a blend of folk and electronic music that features clarinet, cello, viola and violin, and it draws comparison to the music of the chamber pop band Belle & Sebastian, and the indie folk singer-songwriter Justin Vernon. Attendre et Espérer is conceptually about personal and widespread loss and death. Howard explains the album as "a collage of ideas and influences converging on the theme of grief but it's a bit of a hot take on the subject. I don't think I really intended it to be so, but it ended as a linear story of the first three months of grief with, sort of, dreamlike transitions–flitting from thought to thought." The music video for "Dylan Thomas" displays footage of the ocean washing over rocks, the sky, traffic and birds, and was filmed at Shetland Islands, Edinburgh, the coast of Oregon and roads across the United States.

Attendre et Espérer contains adapted lyrics and readings from literary works, including "Do not go gentle into that good night" by Dylan Thomas, The Count of Monte Cristo by Alexandre Dumas, The Bell Jar by Sylvia Plath, Manalive by G.K. Chesterton, "And did those feet in ancient time" by William Blake and "If I Should Die" by Emily Dickinson. The melody for "Jerusalem (Interlude #3)" is adapted from Hubert Parry's "Jerusalem."

== Reception ==
In a review of Attendre et Espérer for PopMatters, Jonathan Frahm says "between the sonic wonder, though, are the real meat and potatoes of the Duke of Norfolk's inner workings–a beating heart and a conscious mind." He notes "Shema," "a jangly indie folk number, belays an infectious, rootsy arrangement about its listeners as it pulls them further into a story that hinges itself on Howard's own reflections on grief." Jerad Walker of Oregon Public Broadcasting describes the sections of "Dylan Thomas / Bitter Bitter" as "over a minute of strings, the steady hum of a cello periodically broken by a flurry of viola and violin" for the instrumental "Dylan Thomas," continuing the song "soon gives way to the second part of the medley, "Bitter Bitter," a beautiful folk rock movement that rides the almost meditative vocals of singer Adam Howard. Brightest Young Things says "Dylan Thomas" is "soothing" and "almost too chill for its own good."

== Tracklisting ==
No.	Title	Length
1.	"Dylan Thomas / Bitter Bitter"	3:55
2.	"Kharon"	4:19
3.	"Shema"	5:58
4.	"Plath (Interlude #1)"	2:35
5.	"The Bell Jar Descends"	5:50
6.	"Kaddish (Interlude #2)"	1:38
7.	"Pale the Ghost / Sharp the Edge"	4:48
8.	"Loch Lerna"	5:38
9.	"Jerusalem (Interlude #3)"	3:00
10.	"The Water Below"	3:59
11.	"Memento Mori"	3:58
12.	"Shema Reprise / Attendre et Espérer"	1:56
Total length:		47:34

== Personnel ==
- Adam Howard – vocals and guitar

=== Additional musicians ===
- Hanna Haas – additional vocals
- Cameron Reed – cello
- Jodi Reed – violin
- Bethany Shorey Fennell – clarinet

=== Readers ===
- Madeleine Brossier – reading "Le Comte De Monte Cristo" on "Shema Reprise / Attendre et Espérer"
- Maggie Gyllenhaal – reading "The Bell Jar" on "Plath (Interlude #1)"
- Éric Herson-Macarel – reading "Quant à vous, Morrel..." on "Shema"
- Alastair Smith – reading "I caught a glimpse of the meaning of death..." on "Jerusalem (#3)"
