= The Duke of Norfolk (musician) =

American folk musician

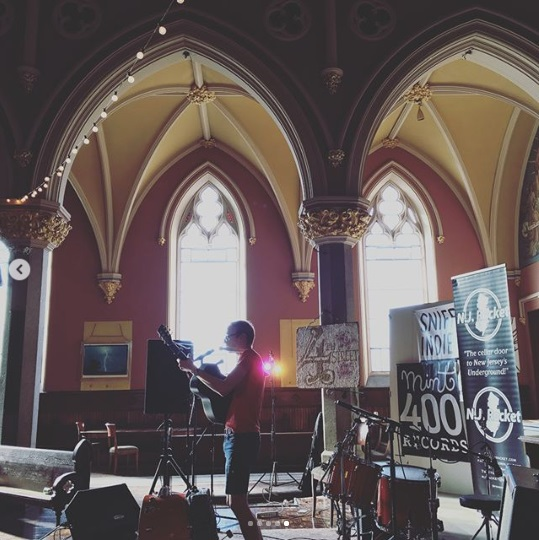
- The Duke of Norfolk at the 2017 North Jersey Indie Rock Festival.

Background information
- Origin: Oklahoma, U.S.
- Genres: Folk music, indie rock
- Years active: 2007–present
- Label: Mint 400, Monty People
- Members: Adam Howard
- Website: thedukeofnorfolk.com

The Duke of Norfolk is an American folk musician from Oklahoma.

== History ==
The Duke of Norfolk is an acoustic folk musician and the artistic moniker of Adam Howard, a native of Oklahoma, that started playing music in folk-rock jam bands as a drummer, and by performing at coffeehouses and colleges. Since 2007, Howard has been writing music, citing influence from the English folk band Tunng, singer-songwriter Sufjan Stevens, and the electronic folk project of Ben Cooper, Radical Face. His first release, a piano-driven album Shadows and Shapes was in 2009, as Adam Howard. In 2010, he began using the name the Duke of Norfolk, and in 2011 he released an EP, entitled The Lazy Sunshine. Amy Jaques of Relix describes his sound as "Irish and American folk, but also heavy [in] percussion, electronica, orchestral music and blues".

=== Mint 400 Records ===
In 2013, the Duke of Norfolk signed with Mint 400 Records and released the five-song EP, Le Monde Tourne Toujours. In 2014, he played at the South by Southwest festival, and released his debut album Birds... Fly South!. The six-song EP Three Days From The Wolf Month released in 2015, while Howard was attending the University of Edinburgh. He performed at the North Jersey Indie Rock Festival on September 23, 2017. Attendre et Espérer, the second full length by the Duke of Norfolk was released in 2018, and features clarinet, cello, viola and violin. Howard explains the album as "a collage of ideas and influences converging on the theme of grief"

=== Additional work ===
The Duke of Norfolk has appeared on several Mint 400 Records compilations. The song "Hark the Herald Angels Sing" appears on A Very Merry Christmas, and features banjo and beatboxing. He contributed "singer/songwriter-esque" versions of "Wouldn't It Be Nice," "Pet Sounds" and "Caroline, No" for Mint 400 Records Presents the Beach Boys Pet Sounds. For At the Movies, the Duke of Norfolk does a rendition of "The Sound of Silence,"

== Discography ==
Albums

- Shadows and Shapes (2009) as Adam Howard
- Birds... Fly South! (2014)
- Attendre et Espérer (2018)
- A Pebble of the Brook (2021)

EPs

- The Lazy Sunshine (2010)
- Le Monde Tourne Toujours (2013)
- Three Days From the Wolf Month (2015)
- There Is a Train (and a platform at either end) (2016)

Appearing on

- A Very Merry Christmas Compilation (2012)
- Mint 400 Records Presents the Beach Boys Pet Sounds (2013)
- Patchwork (2014)
- 1967 (2015)
- In a Mellow Tone (2015)
- Mint 400 Records Presents Nirvana In Utero (2017)
- At the Movies (2018)
