= Murzik =

American dark folk band

- Origin: Minneapolis, Minnesota, U.S.
- Genres: Dark folk, neofolk, gypsy folk
- Years active: 2003–present
- Labels: Pipe Club Records, Mint 400 Records
- Members: Christopher Becknell; Christopher Mcguire; Nathan Simar; Bryan Steenerson
- Website: www.murzikband.com

Murzik is an American dark folk band from Minnesota.

== About ==
Murzik is a gypsy indie folk four-piece band from Minneapolis, Minnesota, that started in 2003. The band name comes from the common Russian name for cats. Duluth News Tribune describes Murzik as the "combin[ed] zestiness of gypsy swing with the somber tones of some Eastern European folk music." They utilize saxophone, bells, dark fiddle, accordion, mandolin and glockenspiel, with bass, drums and acoustic guitar. Murzik cites influence from Édith Piaf and traditional Russian music, such as Vladimir Vysotsky. They draw comparison to the music of DeVotchKa, Nick Cave, Tom Waits and Leonard Cohen.

=== History ===
Bryan Steenerson recorded an eleven-track solo album, self-released on 1 March 2003 under the name Murzik, entitled Dreams. Steenerson's long-time friend, accordionist Nathan Simar joined shortly after hearing the record. In early 2004 bassist, keyboardist and saxophonist Darin Steenerson, mandolinist Jeremy Grace and drummer Tobias Smith joined Murzik. The band started out by experimenting with mixing old eastern European folk and midwest Americana sounds together, to form a sound which they coined as dark folk. They released the five-track EP, Murzik, on 1 September 2004, on Pipe Club Records. Chuck Terhark says "frontman Bryan Steenerson takes the Slavic folk tradition and makes it his own through a morphine-cool vocal delivery and memorable lyric imagery" in his review of Murzik for City Pages. The "somber [and] atmospheric" album, Buried, was released by Pipe Club Records on 10 February 2008. Grace left shortly after the recording of Buried to form the band The Secret Panels, and cellist Ryan Pfeiffer from the group Captain Yonder and violinist Kate Lundberg Dikareva joined Murzik. That same year, Murzik was featured on NPR's national radio show All Things Considered, and the interview covered Murzik's origins and their style of folk music. A University of Minnesota student based their 2009 master's thesis on the style and origin of their sound.

Into the Darkness, described by Twin Cities Daily Planet as a "beautifully crafted dark-folk waltz," was self-released on 2 November 2009. James Apollo joined Murzik for the record release show at Kitty Cat Klub in Dinkytown, on 23 October 2009, with Black Audience opening. They released a music video for the song "Dark Eyes," and Steenerson played a solo acoustic rendition of the song "Bluebird" for BalconyTV in 2010, who calls Murzik's music "beautiful and disturbing all at once, conjur[ing] a sullen, visual atmosphere rife with metaphor and religious imagery." The same year Murzik opened for the Russian pop rock band, Mumiy Troll, at First Avenue nightclub. They performed at the 2011 Midwest Music Festival, and for the live tribute to Vic Chestnutt at the 2012 South by Southwest music festival. Their fourth studio album, A Cat Named Murzik, was self-released on compact disc on 1 May 2012. The record release party was held at Cedar Cultural Center on 19 May 2012, with Bella Ruse.

=== Mint 400 Records ===
Murzik signed with Mint 400 Records in 2014. The unreleased track "Lost Hope Hotel" appears on the compilation album, Patchwork. The album A Cat Named Murzik was reissued by Mint 400 Records in 2015. For 1967, Murzik contributed cover versions of "I'll Be Your Mirror," and "I Think We're Alone Now," which The Pop Break describes as a "glitchy electro spin [which] brings out a dark and lovesick dimension that contrasts the more pop-oriented feel of the original." They performed at Pandora Radio's livestream Metallica tribute concert in 2016. In 2017, Murzik recorded a rendition of "Pennyroyal Tea" for Mint 400 Records Presents Nirvana In Utero.

== Members ==
- Christopher Becknell – violin
- Christopher Mcguire – drums
- Nathan Simar – accordion, vocals and bass
- Bryan Steenerson – vocals and guitar

=== Past members ===
- Jeremy Grace – mandolin
- Kate Lundberg Dikareva – violin
- Ryan Pfeiffer – cello
- Tobias Smith – drums
- Darin Steenerson – bass, keyboard and saxophone

== Discography ==
Albums

- Dreams (2003)
- Buried (2008)
- Into the Darkness (2009)
- A Cat Named Murzik (2012)

EPs

- Murzik (2004)

Appearing on

- Patchwork (2014)
- 1967 (2015)
- Mint 400 Records Presents Nirvana In Utero (2017)
