= Teeter Sperber =

American singer-songwriter

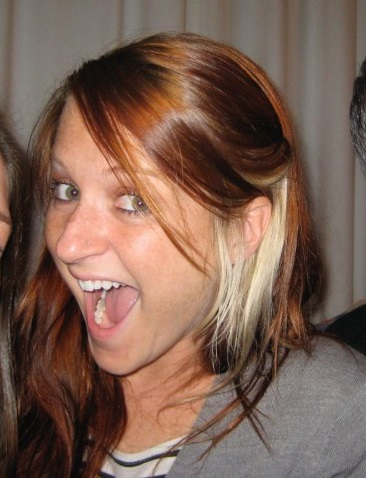
- Teeter Sperber in 2011

Background information
- Genres: Indie rock, dance-pop
- Occupation(s): Songwriter, singer
- Instrument: Vocals
- Years active: 2005–present
- Labels: Creep, Mint 400

Teeter Sperber is an American singer-songwriter. She was the lead singer of Ley Royal Scam, and the lead singer of the electropop group Ladybirds. She has also appeared on two Fairmont albums.

== Background ==
In 2005, Sperber fronted the band Ley Royal Scam, a pop-act that included keyboardist Tyler Pursel. That year they played the Bamboozle festival, opening several shows for Taking Back Sunday. Ley Royal Scam self-released two demos, titled Pregnancy Scare and Sophomore Slump. The band separated later that year, leaving Pursel to pursue work touring as keyboardist with rap rock group Gym Class Heroes.

After the separation of Ley Royal Scam, Sperber relocated to Oregon for "introspection and recharging", but was contacted in 2006 by former bandmate Pursel who was working on the East Coast of the United States, to appear on an upcoming project. Initially, Sperber was asked to sing for one track, but subsequent work led them to write and record together exclusively for the project, making Sperber the lead singer of Ladybirds. Pursel and Sperber met at a Creep Records basement studio in Pennsylvania to finish the recording of Regional Community Theater in January 2007. It was released by Creep Records on September 18, 2007, and was digitally reissued by Mint 400 Records on July 5, 2011. The album received mixed to positive reviews from critics.

Prior to joining Ley Royal Scam, Sperber worked at a summer snowboard camp. Transitioning into music, she did A&R and publicist work for Virgin Records, and worked for MerchDirect. In 2007, she sang on the Intramural song "Impairment Begins with the First Drink", from the album This Is a Landslide by former Desaparecidos guitarist Denver Dalley. Later that year, Sperber was also a guest vocalist on the Fairmont album Wait & Hope, and again in their 2008 release Transcendence. In 2011, Sperber and Neil Sabatino of Fairmont joined to record as Mergers & Acquisitions, releasing an electro-pop EP, Grape Soda.

== Discography ==
=== Albums ===
- Regional Community Theater (2007) as Ladybirds
- Grape Soda (2011) as Mergers and Acquisitions

=== EPs ===
- Pregnancy Scare (2005) as Ley Royal Scam
- Sophomore Slump (2005) as Ley Royal Scam

=== Songs ===
- "Impairment Begins with the First Drink" (2007) by Intramural with Denver Dalley
