= The One & Nines =

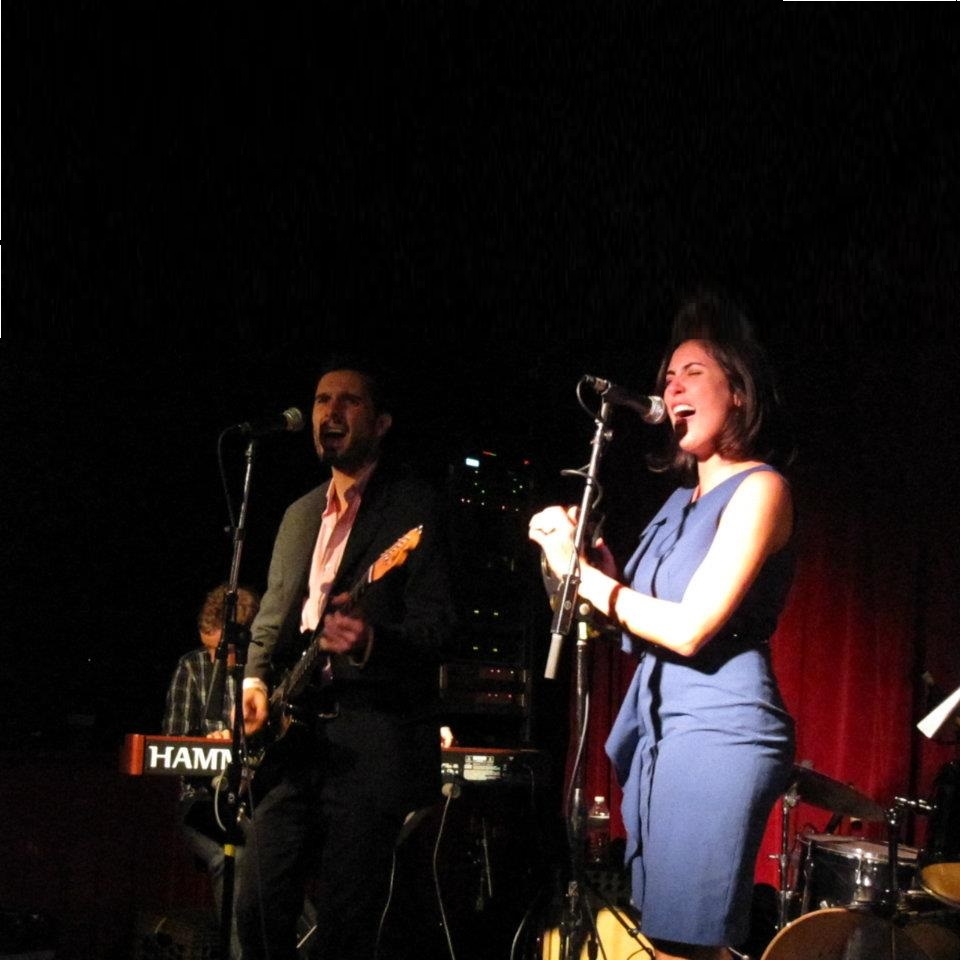
- The One & Nines at Maxwell's in 2011

Background information
- Origin: Jersey City, New Jersey, U.S.
- Genres: Rhythm and blues, soul, indie, rock and roll
- Years active: 2007–current
- Labels: Mint 400 Records, Cotter Records
- Members: Will Hansen; Jeff Marino; Vera Sousa; Barami Waspe
- Website: theoneandnines.com

The One & Nines are an American rhythm and blues band from New Jersey.

== History ==
The One & Nines are an eight piece-band from Jersey City, New Jersey, named after the U.S. Route 1/9, a multi-lane route that runs through urbanized areas of northern New Jersey. Vocalist Vera Sousa grew up listening to Portuguese folk music and Fado, and guitarist and vocalist Jeff Marino became interested in listening to old-school R&B while in high school in Elizabeth, and he collected old vinyl records. On their musical style, The Star-Ledger says the One & Nines are "vintage R&B and Stax-Volt soul – right down to the punctuating blasts from the horns[;] but it's singer Vera Souza's alternately brassy, pained and pouting vocals that really gets the party swinging," Marino and Sousa cite musical influences as the Stones, the Clash, Fats Domino, Howlin' Wolf, Phil Spector, Hank Williams, Arthur Alexander, Duke Ellington and Billie Holiday, and the One & Nines draw comparison to Sharon Jones & the Dap Kings and Booker T. Jones.

Their first release is the seven-track EP, The One & Nines, released on compact disc on December 12, 2009, with Mint 400 Records. The songs "Walked Alone" and "Just Your Fool" were released on 7"-vinyl in 2010. On 25 October 2011, the One & Nines released the songs "Tell Me" and "Make it Easy" on 7"-vinyl with Cotter Records and digitally with Mint 400 Records. A live version of the song "Tears Fall" appears on the 2011 album Our First Compilation.

=== Additional work ===
The One & Nines make contributions to several tribute albums. For Mint 400 Records Presents the Beach Boys Pet Sounds, they "bring their Motown swing to "I'm Waiting for the Day" and "Here Today."" They also recorded renditions of "Let's Spend the Night Together" for 1967, and "Run Chicken Run" for Guitar Rebel: A Tribute to Link Wray.

== Discography ==
EPs

- The One & Nines (2009)

Singles

- "Just Your Fool" (2010)
- "Walked Alone" b/w "Something on Your Mind" (2010)
- "Tell Me" b/w "Make It Easy" (2011)

Appearing on

- Our First Compilation (2011)
- A Very Merry Christmas Compilation (2012)
- Mint 400 Records Presents the Beach Boys Pet Sounds (2013)
- Patchwork (2014)
- 1967 (2015)
- Guitar Rebel: A Tribute to Link Wray (2016)
