= Tyler Pursel =

- Born: June 15, 1983 (age 43)
- Genres: Hip hop, indie rock, dance-pop
- Occupations: Songwriter, record producer
- Instruments: Keyboard, guitar, vocals
- Years active: 2000s–present
- Labels: Warner Bros., Mystery Circles, Fueled by Ramen, Creep Records, Mint 400 Records
- Website: walnutroomrecordings.com

Tyler Pursel is an American songwriter, producer, recording engineer and session instrumentalist.

== Work ==
Pursel began as a guitarist playing in various punk and hardcore bands around the Philadelphia area eventually landing a job as the touring guitarist/keyboardist for Gym Class Heroes in 2006. . Pursel has writing credits for several songs on The Papercut Chronicles II in 2011. Aside from touring and session work, Pursel releases experimental music under his own name and produces for various local artists as well as creates original music for tv/films, such as the independent film Namour. His music has been featured on MTV, FOX and the E! Network.

== Discography ==
- Regional Community Theater (2007) by Ladybirds
- Stronger, Faster, Science (2008) by Grace Gale
- Impending Doom Is Northern Bound (2009) by Tyler Pursel
- The Doom Of Man (2010) by Willing Swords
- 5 Song Demo (2010) by Selfish
- The Papercut Chronicles II (2011) by Gym Class Heroes
- Conversations with the Man to My Left (2011) by Polar Shift
- We Are The Starwalkers (2012) by Eagleegg
- Wavelengths (2013) by Memorygardens
- Russian Cowboys (2013) by Karpets
- How To Take The Burn (2014) by Goddamnit
- The American Mile (2015) by The American Mile
- I (2015) by Yves
- II (2015) by Yves
- "Fever Dreams/Come Undone (2015) by Drvglvngs
- Here Is A List Of Things That Exist (2015) by The Rentiers
- Here I Am (2015) by Ray Adkins
- Fell Off The Deep End (2015) by Neaux
- Endless (2015) by Weakbody
- Death Of Saul (2016) by Death Of Saul
- Danny Justice (2016) by Danny Justice
- I'll Never Be Okay, I'll Never Be The Same (2016) by Goddamnit
- I Can Feel Myself Sinking (2016) by Weakbody
- Election Year (2016) by Hoagie
- Chain Up The Sun (2017) by Neaux
- Houseplant (2017) by Houseplant
