= Dub Proof =

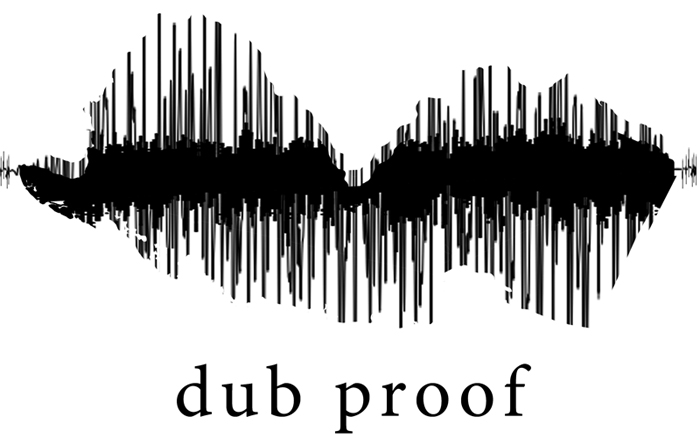

Background information
- Origin: Asbury Park, New Jersey, U.S.
- Genres: Reggae, dub, hip hop, funk
- Years active: 2007–present

Dub Proof is an American, Asbury Park, New Jersey–based reggae band, mixing in elements of dub reggae, old school hip-hop and funk.

== History ==
Dub Proof was founded in 2007 by bassist Nick Paolise, guitarist/vocalist Sean Milano, saxophonist David Hollander and drummer Patrick Clarke. They now perform with anywhere from three to ten members, including keyboardist Addis Pablo (son of Augustus Pablo). Their dub sound is done live.

Their song “Ocean Avenue” made online music zine Lucid Culture’s Top Ten Songs of the Week in April 2009. Lucid Culture called the song, “Woozy instrumental dub reggae with a nice funky groove.”

In 2010, they performed at a benefit concert in New Jersey to raise money for those harmed by the BP oil spill.

Dub Proof was named Top Groove Band at the 18th Annual Asbury Music Awards in 2010. For the 2011 awards, Paolise has been nominated for Top Bassist, and Kates for Top Keyboard Player.

“NJ Dub (Beer)” was released on August 16, 2011. It features a conventional version of the song, and a remix by producer and dub legend Scientist. The single was featured on URB’s 2012 selection of songs for Martin Luther King Day.

== Musical style and influences ==
Dub Proof writes its own music, and also covers classic by Bob Marley, Augustus Pablo, Sugar Minott and others. They have backed and performed with Burning Spear, Mighty Diamonds, Mykhal Rose of Black Uhuru, Pato Banton & The Now Generation, Badfish, EOTO, Culture, Nina Sky, Kosha Dillz, Kyle Rapps, Predator Dub Assassins and others.

The Courier News wrote that Dub Proof “brings the free-form vibe of dub to a live music setting for island-flavored reggae grooves.” Dub Proof released 'It's the Music' (feat. Grindstone Road's Stephanie Quick) under the name Jersey Dub in 2007.

“Dub Proof lays down sensible, thinking man’s groove that puts them right at the highest rank of performers specializing in soul-flavored reggae and slicked-back funk rock,” The Aquarian Weekly wrote. “Styled from the old school, groove-oriented icons of Yellowman and the contemporary slant of Gogol Bordello, Dub Proof takes all bold chances as they move fluidly from the traditional into the jazz smooth sounds of Sade and the bluesy darkness of Curtis Mayfield.”
