= The Next Me (album) =

2009 studio album by Jasmine

Studio album by Jasmine
- Released: May 5, 2009
- Recorded: March 2009
- Genre: Pop, Christian pop
- Length: 32:08
- Label: iShine

Professional ratings
Review scores
Source	Rating
Jesus Freak Hideout	3.5/5 stars
New Release Today	no rating

The Next Me is the debut album released by American pop artist Jasmine. Jasmine was only 14 when the album was released. The Next Me is Jasmine's first and only Christian market release.

== Media recognition ==
"Make a Movie" and "Nothing Left to Say" were featured on Radio Disney when Jasmine won the 2009 N.B.T. (Next Big Thing) competition.

== Sing-along tracks ==
Despite the full-length album containing 10 tracks, only 5 of the songs on the album are original. As consistent with other artists under the iShine label, the last 5 tracks of the album are sing-along versions of the previous 5 songs.

== Track listing ==
All tracks are written by Jasmine and Tony Sagginario except for "Yeah." It's originally by the Gospel singer, Yolanda Adams.

No.	Title	Length
1.	"The Next Me"	3:01
2.	"Time 2 Shine"	3:13
3.	"Yeah"	3:06
4.	"Nothing Left to Say"	3:39
5.	"Make a Movie"	3:09
6.	"The Next Me (Sing-Along Track)"	3:01
7.	"Time 2 Shine (Sing-Along Track)"	3:10
8.	"Yeah (Sing-Along Track)"	3:06
9.	"Nothing Left to Say (Sing-Along Track)"	3:39
10.	"Make a Movie (Sing-Along Track)"	3:10

== Music videos ==
- "Make a Movie"
