= The Multi-Purpose Solution =

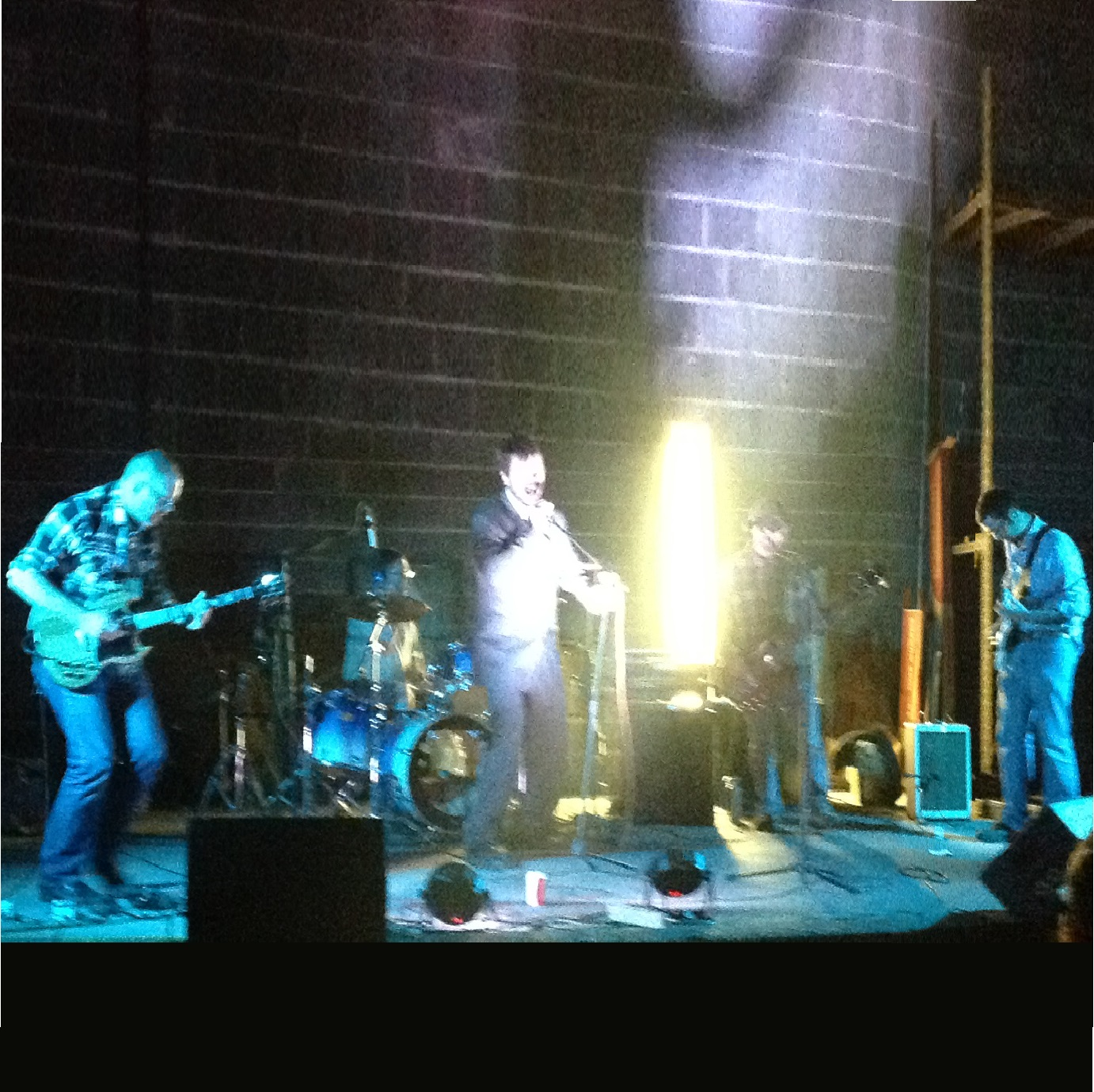
- The Multi-Purpose Solution at The Lumberyard in Nutley, New Jersey in 2013.

Background information
- Origin: Jersey City, New Jersey, U.S.
- Genres: Rock, art punk
- Years active: 1999–2013
- Label: Mint 400 Records
- Members: Dave Caldwell; Alan Ten Hoeve; Stephen Mejias; Dan Prochilo; Peter Prochilo
- Website: themultipurposesolution.com

The Multi-Purpose Solution are an American rock band from New Jersey.

== History ==
The Multi-Purpose Solution is a five-piece rock band from Jersey City, New Jersey that formed in 1999. Guitarist Stephen Mejias and vocalist Peter Prochilo (Jim Teacher) met while studying abroad in England, both college seniors attending Fairleigh Dickinson University. Upon returning to the United States, the two enlisted Prochilo's brother Dan Prochilo and friend Dave Caldwell. The Multi-Purpose Solution were a four-piece band for several years before recruiting their friend Alan Ten Hoeve, a bass-player. According to Mejias, shortly after Hoeve joined they began focusing more on songwriting, practicing at an all-purpose space in Jersey City and playing local venues, such as Hoboken's Maxwell's. Their music is characterized by guttural vocals and piercing guitars. Between 2001 and 2005 the Multi-Purpose Solution released a few EPs and two full-length albums and they appeared on the Weird NJ compilation Local Heroes, Villains, and Artists in 2004. They released How Can a Man Be Tougher Than the World? in 2005. Later that year, the members took a hiatus, playing their last show for five years in 2006.

=== Mint 400 Records ===
They signed to Mint 400 Records in 2011, and digitally reissued their albums. In November of that year, the Multi-Purpose Solution reunited to play Maxwell's with several other Mint 400 Records artists. They appeared on Mint 400 Records Presents the Beach Boys Pet Sounds, covering "Sloop John B", as well as Our First Compilation and Patchwork.

== Personnel ==
- Dave Caldwell – drums
- Alan Ten Hoeve – bass
- Stephen Mejias – guitar
- Dan Prochilo – guitar
- Peter Prochilo – vocals

== Discography ==
Albums

- the mps (2001)
- In Bed (2002)
- How Can a Man Be Tougher Than the World? (2005)

Appearing on

- Local Heroes, Villains, and Artists (2004)
- Our First Compilation (2011)
- Mint 400 Records Presents the Beach Boys Pet Sounds (2013)
- Patchwork (2014)

== Bibliography ==
- Hortillosa, Summer (26 October 2011), "Band with Jersey City roots reunites to find 'Multi-Purpose Solution' for Hoboken concert", The Jersey Journal
- McCall, Tris (14 January 2011), "CD reviews: The Decemberists, Shilpa Ray, The Multi-Purpose Solution, Carl Orff", The Star-Ledger
- Mejias, Stephen (2 November 2011), "The Multi-Purpose Solution: Live at Maxwell's", Stereophile
- Pirate! Staff (11 May 2013), "The Beach Boys Pet Sounds performed by The Mint 400 Roster", Pirate!
- The New York Times Staff (28 September 2003), "On the Towns; Going Out", The New York Times
