= The Howlin' Brothers =

Country blues/string band based in Nashville

- Origin: Ithaca, New York, United States
- Genres: Americana, rock, indie rock, bluegrass
- Years active: 2003–present
- Label: Readymade
- Members: Ian Craft; Jared Green; Dan Swan
- Past members: Ben Plasse, JT Huskey
- Website: thehowlinbrothers.com

The Howlin' Brothers are an American Nashville-based old-time country blues/string band consisting of singer/songwriters Ian Craft (fiddle, mandolin, banjo, and kick-drum), Jared Green (guitar, harmonica, and piano), and Dan Swan (upright bass). They were described by AllMusic as "an Americana string band, but a reconfigured 21st century version, incorporating rock, pop, gospel, jazz, R&B, Dixieland, country blues, and who knows what else into the mix."

== History ==
Craft and Green met while attending Ithaca College. They discovered a mutual love of traditional and roots music, and formed The Howlin' Brothers in 2003. After developing a following in Ithaca, the Howlin' Brothers relocated to Nashville, where they self-released their debut album, Mountain Songs, in 2007; and meeting Jt Huskey shortly after. After independently releasing three additional albums, the Howlin' Brothers were introduced by a mutual friend to producer/musician Brendan Benson, who signed them to his label, Readymade. Benson produced the band's 2013 release, Howl, which featured appearances from Jypsi and Warren Haynes. The album was critically acclaimed, and The Howlin' Brothers launched a successful tour in the US and Canada. In May, 2014, the band released their second Benson-produced record on Readymade, Trouble, which Rolling Stone called a "rip-roarin', hootenanny on wax that puts a rocked-out spin on old-timey bluegrass."

== Discography ==
- 2017 Cannonball
- 2014 Trouble Readymade Records
- 2013 The Sun Studio Session (EP)
- 2013 Howl Readymade Records
- 2012 Old Time All The Time (Live compilation)
- 2011 Baker Street Blues
- 2009 Long Hard Year
- 2007 Mountain Blues
