= 1967 (Mint 400 Records album) =

2015 cover compilation album

Compilation album by various artists
- Released: 30 March 2015
- Genre: Alternative rock, indie rock
- Length: 46:43
- Label: Mint 400

Various artists chronology
Transformed: A Tribute to Lou Reed (2014)	1967 (2015)	In a Mellow Tone (2015)

1967 is a compilation album released by the Mint 400 Records label released in 2015. It is the label's sixth compilation, and features songs that were written or made popular in the year 1967.

== Content ==
The fourteen-track album was released by Mint 400 Records for free on 30 March 2015, and showcases the Duke of Norfolk, Fairmont, Fawn and Rabbit, Jack Skuller, the Maravines, Moscow Centre, Murzik, the One & Nines, Netorare Fan Club, Tri-State and Zach Uncles. In a Pirate! press release, the staff writer notes "the majority of bands on Mint 400 Records have a strong 60's influence and 1967 seemed like the year that was most important." The album contains songs that were written or recorded during 1967, the second compilation from Mint 400 Records which features music from that era, the previous being the Beach Boys' Pet Sounds compilation.

On recording for the compilation, Jack Skuller explains "I have always been drawn to the dark and deep yet simplistic poetry of the Doors. I collaborated with Neil Sabatino on the arrangement. My goal when recording "Love Me Two Times" was to explore the blues element in the Doors' writing." For his cover of "The Song Of Seeonee," a song removed from Disney's animated film The Jungle Book because it was deemed "too dark," Adam Howard of the Duke of Norfolk says "it may at first seem incongruous to throw a Disney song in the mix with bunch of influential 60's rock but, considering the influence of the music of Disney's films, I think it’s actually quite fitting."

Summarizing the compilation in a review for The Pop Break, columnist Shannon Moore concludes "depending on where the listener stands it could be considered either blasphemy to touch these tracks, or beating a dead horse who never had much life to begin with," and further adds "while not every moment on 1967 is perfect, each artist puts their respective covers through a unique prism, making for some imaginative and enjoyable results."

== Track listing ==
No.	Title	Writer(s)	Artist	Length
1.	"Let's Spend the Night Together"	The Rolling Stones	The One & Nines	3:50
2.	"Arnold Layne"	Pink Floyd	Fawn and Rabbit	2:38
3.	"Carrie Anne"	The Hollies	Tri-State	3:12
4.	"To Love Somebody"	Bee Gees	Fairmont	2:56
5.	"Love Me Two Times"	The Doors	Jack Skuller	3:32
6.	"You Ain't Goin' Nowhere"	The Byrds	The Maravines	3:20
7.	"The Song of Seeonee" (from The Jungle Book)	Terry Gilkyson	The Duke of Norfolk	3:29
8.	"I Go to Sleep"	The Applejacks	Moscow Centre	3:17
9.	"I'll Be Your Mirror"	The Velvet Underground, Nico	Murzik	2:52
10.	"Can't Take My Eyes Off You"	Frankie Valli	Netorare Fan Club	3:35
11.	"The Hunter Gets Captured by the Game"	The Marvelettes	The One & Nines	3:15
12.	"Bummer in the Summer"	Love	Zach Uncles	2:42
13.	"Waterloo Sunset"	The Kinks	Fairmont	2:20
14.	"I Think We're Alone Now"	Tommy James and the Shondells	Murzik	5:38
Total length:				46:43

== See also ==
- 1967 in music
