= Fairmont (band) =

American indie rock band

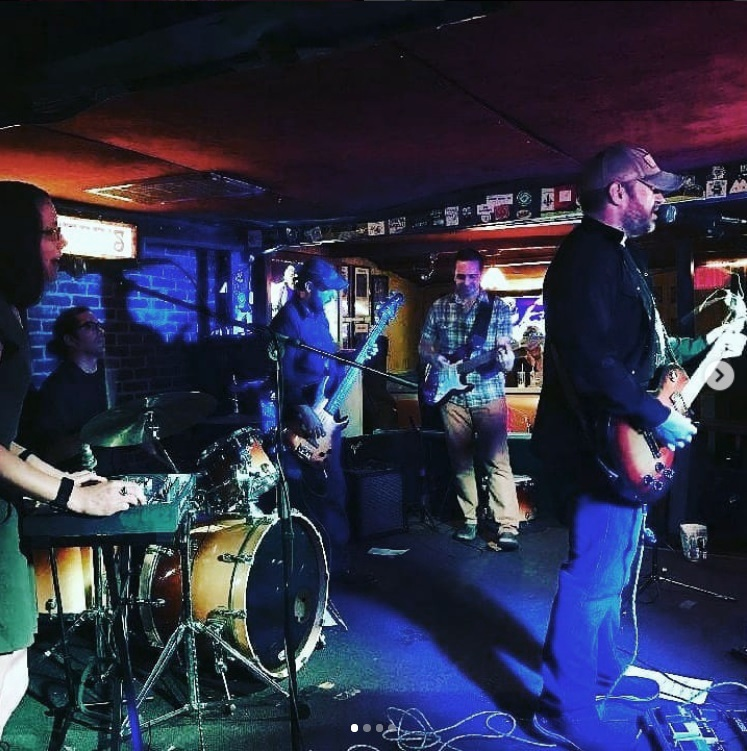
- Fairmont live in 2018

Background information
- Origin: North Jersey, U.S.
- Genres: Indie rock, alternative rock, punk rock
- Years active: 2001–present
- Labels: Reinforcement Records, Renfield Records, Go For Broke Records, Mint 400 Records
- Members: Jane Keating; Christian Kisala; Neil Sabatino
- Past members: Andy Applegate; Matt Cheplic; Evan Pope; Mike Burns; Dave Caldwell; Sam Carradori; Clancy Flynn; John McGuire; Kevin Metz; Corneilius "Corn" Moore; Bruno Rocha; Scott Wyden Kivowitz
- Website: fairmontmusic.com

Fairmont is an American indie rock band from New Jersey, fronted by Neil Sabatino. They have released fourteen full-length albums, as well as six EPs, and toured across the United States for over two decades of their existence.

== History ==
Fairmont is an indie rock band, based in North Jersey that formed in 2001. That year, after leaving the Eyeball Record's emo-punk band Pencey Prep, Sabatino signed with Reinforcement Records under the moniker Fairmont, a homage to the Minnesota city. Fairmont was initially a solo acoustic project. Over the years the group became a blend of indie rock and pop.

=== Early years ===
The debut sixteen-track album, Pretending Greatness is Awaiting, was released on December 3, 2001. Work on the second album Anomie was delayed in March 2003, as three of the members quit the night before recording began. Shortly after, former Pencey Prep bassist John McGuire joined Fairmont, as did guitarist Kevin Metz. During that year, Fairmont performed at local venues, such as Arlene's Grocery in Manhattan, New York City, with Fighting Gravity and Val Emmich. By 2005, Fairmont made three tours across the United States, in addition to performing locally with Nada Surf and Ted Leo. That same year, they released their third full-length Hell is Other People, an album heavily influenced by McGuire's fondness of bands like the Replacements and Hüsker Dü. The content of the album was conceptually based on Jean-Paul Sartre's play, No Exit. It was jointly released by Reinforcement Records and Renfield Records.

Fairmont's fourth full-length Wait & Hope, an up-tempo indie rock album, was released on June 12, 2007. It is the last to feature McGuire. Longtime collaborator Teeter Sperber provided vocals for three of the songs, "Fredo", "Dahlia" and "Yearbook". In an interview with Deborah Draisin in Jersey Beat, Sabatino describes it as a "very minimal[ist] album." Wait & Hope is also the last Fairmont album released under its previous indie labels; in 2007 Sabatino founded Mint 400 Records, and retroactively released earlier Fairmont albums.

=== Mint 400 Records ===
Keyboardist Christian Kisala joined the group in 2008. After writing songs with a female counterpart in mind, Sabatino contacted friend Teeter Sperber, as well singer of The Narrative Suzie Zeldin. Both would appear on the 2008 release Transcendence, which was produced by Bryan Russell. The album appears at No. 52 in Gary Wien's book Are You Listening?, a listing of his top 100 albums of a decade, which was compiled from a six-month review of over 2,220 releases. It was followed by a national tour supporting Life of Agony frontperson Keith Caputo, starting in August 2008. The six-track EP The Meadow at Dusk was released on 12"-vinyl in 2009, and debuted on CMJ charts at No. 176.

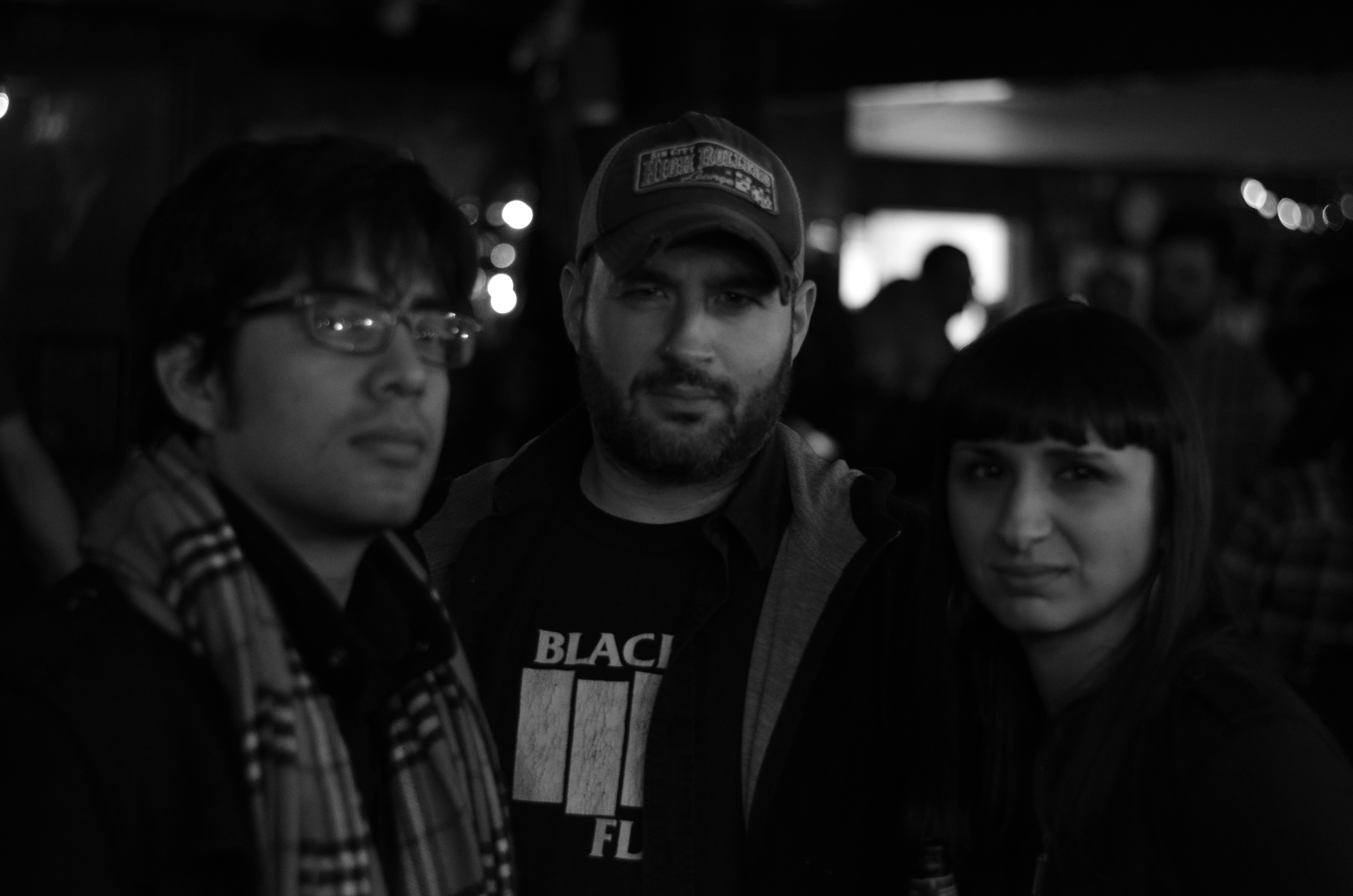
Fairmont in 2013; from left to right: Christian Kisala, Neil Sabatino, and Sam Carradori.

In 2010, Fairmont released their sixth album Destruction Creation, and the following year Mint 400 Records compiled a retrospective collection of Fairmont's first decade of releases. The Grand and Grandiose was released in 2013, followed by a live acoustic EP in 2014. For their 2015 album 8½, Christian Kisala moved from Malletkat to Xylarimba and Vibraphone. Fairmont performed at the 2016 North Jersey Indie Rock Festival. As they finished work on 2017's A Spring Widow, Kisala switched solely to Vibraphone, and the band also saw the addition of Matt Cheplic, a current member of the Bitter Chills, and bassist Mike Burns who formerly played with Sabatino in the punk band Little Green Men in the 1990s. Their tenth studio album We Will Burn That Bridge When We Get To It was released in 2018, and features Lisa Grabinski on keyboards and vocals. Kisala moved to drums, while longtime drummer Andy Applegate went on medical leave. In January 2019, We Will Burn That Bridge When We Get To It debuted on the NACC radio charts at No. 143 and climbed to No. 126 in its third week; Fairmont's second release to chart on college radio charts. With the 2020 album Liminal Spaces Fairmont changed lineups again to include Matt Cheplic switching to bass guitar and Evan Pope joined on rhythm guitar. In December 2020, Liminal Spaces debuted on the NACC radio charts at No. 127 and peaked at #116 in its four weeks on the charts; Fairmont's third release to chart on college radio charts. On Fairmont's 12th studio album Recluse Jamboree they debuted at #98 on the NACC charts, the highest the band had ever charted up until that point and landed at #14 on the Sub-Modern Chart in its first week and spent 3 weeks on the charts. In 2025 the band reached its highest chart position with NACC at #91 in its three weeks on with the LP “I Wish I Was Stupid" and again returned to the charts in 2026 with "Everything Is Fleeting" for 4 consecutive weeks.

=== Additional work ===
Sam Carradori, Christian Kisala and Neil Sabatino also recorded as Ted Dancin!. Christian Kisala records for Mint 400 Records as CK Vibes, and appears as commacommaspacespace on the Mint 400 Records compilation album, At the Movies & At the Movies II. Neil Sabatino has multiple tracks and an instrumental album out under his own name and in 2023 joined with Kisala to form the instrumental project Please Be Careful with drummer Anthony Freda.

== Band members ==
Current members

- Neil Sabatino – lead vocals, guitar (2001–present)
- Christian Kisala – keyboards, malletkat, xylorimba, vibraphone, drums (2008–present)
- Jane Keating (Lisa Grabinski) – keyboards, backing vocals (2017–present)

Former members

- Dave Caldwell – drums (2001–2002)
- Bruno Rocha – bass (2001–2002)
- Scott Wyden Kivowitz – keyboards (2002–2003)
- Corneilius "Corn" Moore – drums (2002)
- Andy Applegate – drums (2003–2023)
- Kevin Metz – guitar (2003–2007)
- John McGuire – bass (2004–2007)
- Sam Carradori – bass, backing vocals (2008–2015)
- Clancy Flynn – violin, viola (2008–2009)
- Mike Burns – bass (2015–2019)
- Matt Cheplic – guitar, backing vocals (2016–2023)
- Evan Pope – rhythm guitar (2019–2023)

Timeline

== Discography ==
Albums

- Pretending Greatness is Awaiting (2001)
- Anomie (2003)
- Hell is Other People (2005)
- Wait & Hope (2007)
- Transcendence (2008)
- Destruction Creation (2010)
- The Grand and Grandiose (2013)
- 8½ (2015)
- A Spring Widow (2017)
- We Will Burn That Bridge When We Get To It (2018)
- Liminal Spaces (2020)
- Recluse Jamboree (2023)
- I Wish I Was Stupid (2024)
- Everything Is Fleeting (2026)

EPs

- The Hand That Holds the Knife Must Be Cold and Steady (2002)
- LeMal (2003)
- Subtle Art of Making Enemies (2006)
- The Meadow at Dusk (2009)
- A Valentines Day EP (2010)
- Live & Acoustic from the Forest of Chaos (2014)
- Morning Coffee Vibes (2021)

Compilations

- A Retrospective 2001–2011 (2011)
- Demo's & Lost EP's 2001–2005 (2019)
- Songs From The Radio (2020)
- A Retrospective 2011–2021 (2021)
- Transcendence: Remastered Deluxe Edition (2024)

Appearing on

- Reinforcement Records Presents Spring 2002 Music Sampler (2002)
- Reinforcement Records Presents Summer 02 (2002)
- 52 Lessons On Life (2003)
- Our First Compilation (2011)
- A Very Merry Christmas Compilation (2012)
- Independent Clauses Presents Never Give Up, A Tribute To The Postal Service (2013)
- Mint 400 Records Presents the Beach Boys Pet Sounds (2013)
- Patchwork (2014)
- Transformed: A Tribute To Lou Reed (2014) as Neil Sabatino
- 1967 (2015)
- In a Mellow Tone (2015)
- 24 Hour Songwriting Challenge|The 3rd Annual 24 Hour Songwriting Challenge (2016)
- Guitar Rebel: A Tribute to Link Wray (2016)
- Mint 400 Records Presents Nirvana In Utero (2017)
- At the Movies (2018)
- NJ / NY Mixtape (2018)
- Don't Fade On Me: A Tribute To Tom Petty (2019)
- Lamp Light The Fire: A Compilation of Quiet(ER) Songs, Vol. 3 (2020)
- At The Movies II (2021)
- Zoe's Project (2022)
- Standard Issue (2022)
- Flannel Dreams (2023)
- Shane-Michael Vidaurri & Friends (2023)
- Neon & Hairspray (2024)
- Sound & Vision: A Tribute To David Bowie (2025)
- 8 Track KnickKnacks: A Compilation of Songs Written In The 1970's (2026)
