= Jack Skuller =

American musician

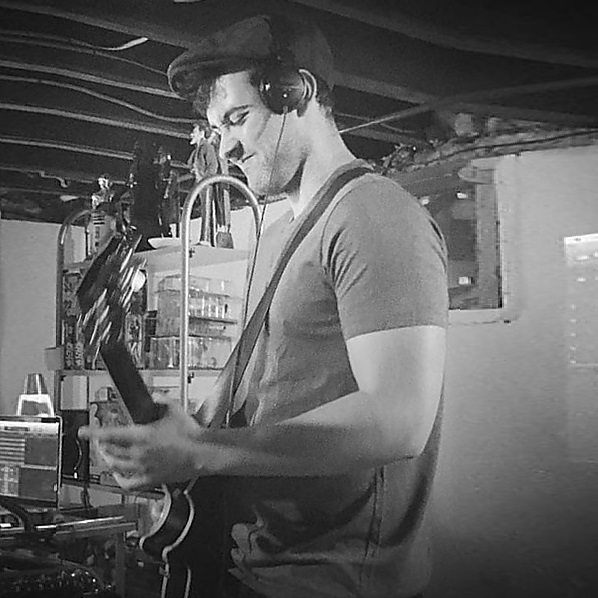
- Skuller recording in the Forest of Chaos in October 2016

Background information
- Origin: Weehawken, New Jersey, U.S.
- Genres: Indie rock, rockabilly, blues
- Occupations: Singer, musician, songwriter
- Instruments: Vocals, guitar
- Years active: 2010–present
- Label: Bar/None
- Member of: The Skullers
- Website: jackskuller.com

Jack Skuller is an American singer-songwriter and the lead singer of indie rock band the Skullers.

== History ==
Skuller was born in New York, and started writing songs and performing in school talent shows in Weehawken, New Jersey, at eight years old. He credits watching his father play in New York City as an early inspiration for making a career in music. As an eight grader, he participated in a three-night Simon & Garfunkel tribute show in New York City, as well as in the Hoboken Arts and Music Festival, where co-founder of Bar/None Records Glenn Morrow saw him performing and signed him. He released "Love Is a Drum" with Bar/None on 7-inch vinyl and digital download on April 20, 2010. It features Nada Surf drummer Ira Elliot and production by Daniel Rey. Skuller also made a cameo that year in a Supercute! music video. In 2012, he appeared in the Disney Channel's musical talent competition The Next BIG Thing with mentors Cher Lloyd, Ross Lynch and Laura Marano, where he was billed as a "modern rock and pop singer and songwriter." Skuller went on a fifteen-city tour with Radio Disney.

In 2014, Skuller signed with Mint 400 Records and released the single "Tell Me Your Heart", described as an "early '60s-inspired tune". That year, he was also awarded the Holly Prize at the Songwriter's Hall of Fame. Skuller appears on several Mint 400 Records compilations, including 2015's In a Mellow Tone, and 2016's Guitar Rebel: A Tribute to Link Wray, which contains a "rumbly version" of "Slinky."

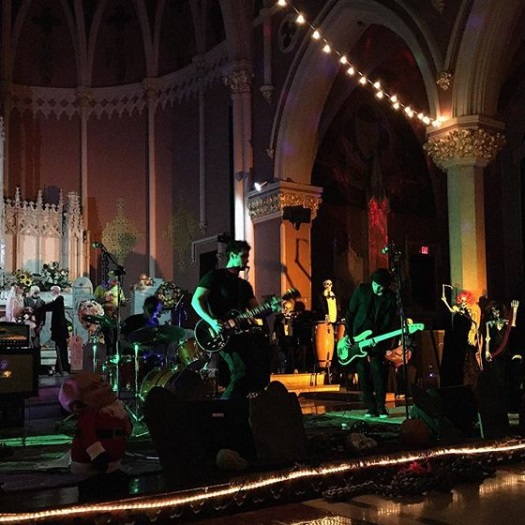
The Skullers at Cathedral Hall, 2016 Halloween Party

In late 2016, Skuller was joined by drummer Gabriel Scholis-Fernandez and bassist Luigi Sardi to form the Skullers. They play a modern blend of rock with blues based grooves. Their debut EP Meet the Skullers was self-released on October 6, 2017. The EP was produced by Joel Hamilton. The Skullers performed at the North Jersey Indie Rock Festival on September 23, 2017.

In 2018, the Skullers released a cover of Richard Hell's version of "I'm Your Man" for the charity Career Gear, and performed at the Hoboken Holiday Banding Concert.

== Discography ==
Albums

- The Early Years (2016)

EPs

- Sun Studio Sessions (2016)
- Meet the Skullers (2017)

Songs

- "Love Is a Drum" (2010)
- "Tell Me Your Heart" (2014)
- "Can You See Me?" (2014)
- "Hard To Want" (2014)
- "Pressure Face" (2017)

Appearing on

- Patchwork (2014)
- 1967 (2015)
- In a Mellow Tone (2015)
- Guitar Rebel: A Tribute to Link Wray (2016)
