= Jasmine (American singer) =

American singer (born 1994)

- Also known as: Jasmine Sagginario; Jazz
- Born: Jasmine Alexandria Sagginario; September 1, 1994 (age 32); Los Angeles, California, US
- Genres: Pop; christian pop
- Occupation: Singer
- Instrument: Vocals
- Years active: 2009–present
- Labels: iShine; Jsound

Jasmine Alexandria Sagginario, better known simply as Jasmine (born September 1, 1994), is an American singer. Jasmine is best known for winning Radio Disney's 2009 N.B.T. (Next Big Thing) competition. She was a featured artist for Trinity Broadcasting Network's iShine KNECT, providing the show's original theme song. To date, Jasmine has released one album under iShine Records and several standalone singles, including singles that have been featured on major compilation albums and soundtracks.

== Personal background ==
Jasmine was born into a family of mixed ethnic backgrounds, including people of Hispanic and Italian descent. Jasmine was born in Los Angeles, California, but she and her family moved to Nashville, Tennessee, when she was eight years old. Before she became a singer, Jasmine took up cheerleading, but due to a constant strain on her vocal cords from yelling and shouting, Jasmine decided to give up cheerleading to pursue a career in music. Jasmine became interested in music when she was twelve years old.

== Professional background ==
=== Acting career ===
Jasmine started to pursue an acting career and auditioned for several roles in Los Angeles. In 2011, she caught the attention of the acting agent Mitchell Gossett (the agent of Miley Cyrus), who is now representing Jasmine as her agent. "Jasmine has the natural ability to deliver a concept and pull you into what she is saying. I look forward to being a part of her future success in this industry," says Gossett.

=== Music career ===
Jasmine was a featured artist on iShine KNECT, a Christian tween show on TBN. In fact, her debut album was released on iShine Records. Season 2 of IShine KNECT does not feature Jasmine.

In 2009, at the age of 15, Jasmine entered, placed, and won Radio Disney's N.B.T. (Next Big Thing) music contest. Jasmine released her debut single Make a Movie on the soundtrack for Starstruck (2010 film). After The Next Me, Jasmine debuted her second single, "Boy Crazy". It was featured on Radio Disney Jams, Vol. 12. Then, in November, she released "Knock Knock". A music video and official remix were also made for the song.

On January 5, 2012, Jasmine released her third single, "GYOB (Get Your Own Boyfriend)", under the label Jsound. Jasmine Sagginario has started a band with her little sister Talia, called 2XO. Tally was cast on Season 2 and Season 3 of The Rap Game. On July 19, 2017, 2XO released their debut single "Summer Love". On December 6, 2017, 2XO released their version of Sleigh Ride through SoundCloud.

== Discography ==
Solo albums

- The Next Me (Jasmine album) (May 5, 2009)

Soundtrack albums

- Starstruck Soundtrack (February 9, 2010)
- Radio Disney Jams, Vol. 12 (March 30, 2010)

Solo singles

- "Boy Crazy" (2010)
- "Knock Knock" (2010)
- "GYOB (Get Your Own Boyfriend)" (2012)
- "Make It Louder" (2012)

2XO albums

- TBA (TBA)

2XO singles

- "Summer Love" (featuring Ricky Garcia) (2017)
- "Sleigh Ride" (2017)
- "Blame It On You" (2019)
