= 18th & Addison =

American punk rock duo

- Origin: Toms River, New Jersey, United States
- Genres: Punk rock; Pop punk
- Years active: 2013–present
- Labels: Wiretap Records; Management: Waldman Management
- Members: Tom Kunzman; Kait DiBenedetto
- Website: www.18thandaddison.com

18th & Addison is an American Punk rock duo from Toms River, New Jersey, formed in 2013. The band consists of vocalists and guitarists Tom Kunzman and Kait DiBenedetto. The group released their Little Parasites EP in 2015 its debut studio album Makeshift Monster in 2016, an EP titled Vultures in 2018, and their Old Blues/Modern Love EP in 2019.

== History ==
=== 2013–14: Formation ===
18th & Addison formed in November 2013 as an acoustic duo by Tom Kunzman and Kait DiBenedetto. Kunzman was formerly in the punk band A Criminal Risk and DiBenedetto was one of MTV's first recording artists with her then solo project. She is also the guitarist in the band What's Eating Gilbert, the side project of Chad Gilbert of seminal pop/punk band New Found Glory. The duo met through playing local shows at a youth center. Realizing over time how much they have in common, they started hanging out more and writing songs during their downtime. After the dissolution of their respective bands, the transition was seamless and inevitable. When the band transitioned from acoustic to live, first they would cover songs and then started writing their own songs acoustically. According to DiBenedetto, "What was so cool about the recording process was being able to plug in electric guitars, drums, and figure out bass lines. Bringing it to life for us was a little bit different than other bands where they do write all the songs electric maybe at a band practice or something and then bring them to life. For us, it was a totally different way of bringing the songs to life because we were writing them on acoustic guitars, so then it made the songs sound bigger and better than we thought they would. It's been awesome to see how energetic the songs are live."

The band name came to the duo "one day hanging out at Kait's house. 'Addison' references where Kait grew up, then adding 18, Tom's house number. "We didn't want the name to just be one word, so we thought if we added my house number, it would fill it out nicely and it stuck. 18th & Addison sounds more like a destination or something to me. Plus, that name really represents us as a duo which was and is a big deal to us," said Kunzman. The meaning behind the name is the band's homes, families, and "where we were when this all started for us meaning our relationship as well as our music."

The first song the band wrote together was "Running" which was later used on their debut extended play. DiBenedetto said the song was, "So old that it was a song before we even thought to take this band serious."

=== 2015–2017: Debut EP and Makeshift Monster ===
18th & Addison's debut was their EP, Little Parasites, which was released on January 20, 2015, and contained 7 tracks. "The both of us feel really, really good about this being our first release together" says Kunzman. "'Little Parasites' is pretty much a culmination of everything we've learned in our past with our old bands, and a lot of self-realization outside of music. It's probably really corny to call it "honest" but that's exactly what it is. We're always learning about ourselves, the world we live in, and life in general and this EP captures where we are, and who we are as people at this time and it's exactly how we want it. I definitely speak for the both of us when I say we haven't been more excited or proud of anything in our entire lives." The EP's lead single was, "Jealousy."

After promoting their EP through shows around the U.S., in June 2016, 18th & Addison announced they were releasing their first studio album in July through their own label. Makeshift Monster was released on July 15, 2016, and included 11 tracks; the record's lead single was, "War."

In June 2017, it was announced that 18th & Addison made it as finalists on Ernie Ball: PLAY Warped Tour 2017 and were to play in Camden, New Jersey on July 7. Near the end of their set, Kunzman proposed to DiBenedetto on stage and they became engaged at their first appearance at Warped Tour.

On September 13, 18th & Addison shared that they wrote a song titled, "Crumble and Crawl" for the short film "Cold & Calculated" which Kunzman would have a role in. Six days later, the band premiered the music video for "Moving Mountains" through New Noise Magazine. They released their cover of "You're a Mean One, Mr. Grinch" on the day of Thanksgiving as a free download exclusively on their website up until the end of the year.

=== 2018: Vultures ===
On February 13, 2018, 18th & Addison announced that they would be opening for New Found Glory on the Sick Tour XL in May. They announced on March 3 that their second EP, titled Vultures, was to be released on June 1, 2018. The lead single from the album, "Time Bomb," was released on April 13 and its music video premiered on the 20th through mxdwn.

=== Ace Frehley "Spaceman" ===
On October 19, 2018, it was announced that DiBenedetto and Kunzman were featured co-writers on the song "Mission To Mars", track seven on Ace Frehley's (former guitarist of KISS) brand new album "Spaceman".

=== 2019 and "Old Blues / Modern Love" ===
On May 28 the band announced they would be releasing a new single titled "Leeches". This would be the first mention of new music since releasing their EP Vultures in June 2018. Although no mention of a release date just yet, the band posted a Spotify presave link on our social media platforms.

On July 11, 2019, just two months after announcing the single, Wiretap Records announced that they had signed the band and that a new EP would be due out in September.

On September, 6th, 2019, the band released their 4-song EP, "Old Blues / Modern Love". The band has described this release as their favorite thus far and it features their single "Leeches". The band released a music video for "Leeches" and represents letting go of the negativity around you and moving on.

On October 25, 2019, Kait and Tom married after almost 9 years of dating.

=== "Broke Down in Babylon" ===
In 2021, 18th & Addison released their single "Broke Down in Babylon" featuring Fred Mascherino of Taking Back Sunday. Amidst the crippling conditions of COVID-19, the band decided to self-release, direct and film the music video for Broke Down in Babylon themselves from their home using only an iPhone, an old lighting rig, and white tablecloths as a backdrop. This video also features Fred Mascherino.

== Musical style and influences ==
18th & Addison's music style has generally been regarded as alternative rock and pop punk.

18th & Addison has expressed appreciation for Chuck Ragan The Clash, Elvis Presley, Alkaline Trio, New Found Glory and Panic! At The Disco.

Kunzman cited Hot Water Music as a, "huge inspiration," to the band and Dibenedetto cited Mest as what brought her and Kunzman together. DiBenedetto's personal influences are Elvis Presley, The Everly Brothers, Green Day, New Found Glory, and Good Charlotte. Kunzman's are Green Day, The Clash, Rancid, Alkaline Trio, Social Distortion and Blink-182.

== Members ==
Current

- Tom Kunzman – vocals, guitar(2013–present)
- Kait DiBenedetto – vocals, bass (2013–present)

Touring musicians

- Brian Dylla – drums, percussion

== Discography ==
Albums

- Makeshift Monster (2016)

EPs

- Little Parasites EP (2015)
- VULTURES EP (2018)
- Old Blues / Modern Love EP (2019)

Singles

- "Jealousy" (2015)
- "War" (2016)
- "Time Bomb" (2018)
- "Leeches" (2019)
- "When I'm Alone" (2019)
- "Broke Down in Babylon" (2021)

== See also ==
- List of alternative rock artists
