= Psalm 150 (disambiguation) =

Psalm 150 is final psalm of the Book of Psalms.

Psalm 150 may also refer to:

- Psalm 150 (Bruckner), a psalm setting by Anton Bruckner
- Psalm 150 (Franck), a psalm setting by César Franck
- Psalm 150 (band), a seven-piece Jesus music band
