= Psalm 74 =

Biblical psalm

- "O God, why hast thou cast us off for ever?"
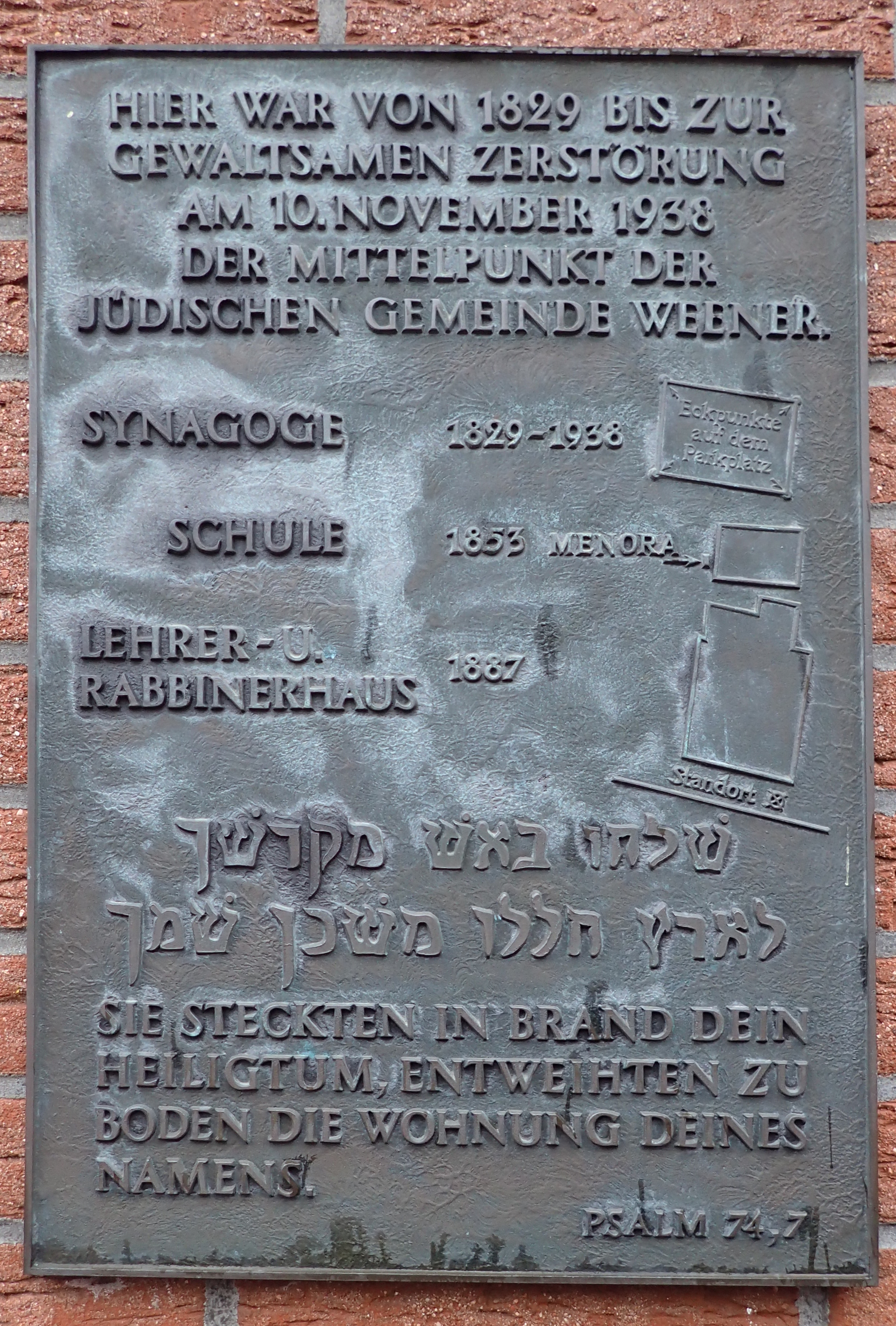
- Psalm 74:7 ("They have set Thy sanctuary on fire") on a memorial plaque at the Weener Synagogue
- Other name: Psalmus 73; "Ut quid Deus reppulisti in finem iratus"
- Language: Hebrew (original)

Psalm 74
- ← Psalm 73 Psalm 75 →
- Book: Book of Psalms
- Hebrew Bible part: Ketuvim
- Order in the Hebrew part: 1
- Category: Sifrei Emet
- Christian Bible part: Old Testament
- Order in the Christian part: 19

Psalm 74 is the 74th psalm of the Book of Psalms, beginning in English in the King James Version: "O God, why hast thou cast us off for ever?". In the slightly different numbering system used in the Greek Septuagint and Latin Vulgate translations of the Bible, this psalm is Psalm 73. In Latin, it is known as "Ut quid Deus reppulisti in finem iratus". Subheaded a maschil or contemplation, and a community lament, it expresses the pleas of the Jewish community in the Babylonian captivity. It is attributed to Asaph.

The psalm forms a regular part of Jewish, Catholic, Lutheran, Anglican and other Protestant liturgies. It has been set to music, notably in Bach's Gott ist mein König, BWV 71. Several composers set the psalm or verses from it in the 20th and 21st centuries.

== Content ==
Verses 1–3 open this psalm by imploring God to "remember your people", and to "remember Mount Zion". The psalm continues in verses 3b to 11 by describing the destruction of the Temple by "the enemies of God". Verses 12–17 recall and praise the might of God, and the psalm ends (verses 18–23) by imploring the Lord (verse 18) to remember Israel and come to her aid.

The enemy is not named, but may refer to King Nebuchadnezzar. According to the Targum, the reference is to Antiochus Epiphanes.

Verse 1 portrays the image of the people of Israel as God's flock, "the sheep of your pasture".

== Uses ==
=== Judaism ===
- Psalm 74 is recited on the fast of the Tenth of Tevet in some traditions.
- It is recited on the second day of Passover in some traditions.
- Verses 2 and 12 are recited during the blessings before the Shema on the second day of Rosh Hashanah.

=== Christianity ===
In the Church of England's Book of Common Prayer, this psalm is appointed to be read on the evening of the fourteenth day of the month.

== Musical settings ==
Heinrich Schütz set Psalm 74 in a metred version in German, "Dennoch hat Israel zum Trost", SWV 171, as part of the Becker Psalter, first published in 1628.

In his 1708 cantata Gott ist mein König, BWV 71, Bach used three verses from the psalm.

Pavel Chesnokov composed "Salvation is Created'" as a choral work in 1912, the fifth in his Ten Communion Hymns, scored for six voices (SATTBB), as a communion hymn based on verse 12 in Russian and on a synodal Kievan chant melody.

Max Drischner composed a setting of verse 16, added to Psalm 4: 7, 9, as the final movement of his Tübinger Psalmen for voice, violin and organ, or choir, melody instrument and keyboard instrument, in 1948. Stefans Grové set the psalm for mezzo-soprano, flute and harp in 1974.

Ernani Aguiar composed a choral setting in Latin, Salmo 74, in 2001.

== Text ==
The following table shows the Hebrew text of the Psalm with vowels, alongside the Koine Greek text in the Septuagint and the English translation from the King James Version. Note that the meaning can slightly differ between these versions, as the Septuagint and the Masoretic Text come from different textual traditions. (Note: A 1917 translation directly from Hebrew to English by the Jewish Publication Society can be found here or here, and an 1844 translation directly from the Septuagint by L. C. L. Brenton can be found here. Both translations are in the public domain.) In the Septuagint, this psalm is numbered Psalm 73.

#	Hebrew	English	Greek
1	מַשְׂכִּ֗יל לְאָ֫סָ֥ף לָמָ֣ה אֱ֭לֹהִים זָנַ֣חְתָּ לָנֶ֑צַח יֶעְשַׁ֥ן אַ֝פְּךָ֗ בְּצֹ֣אן מַרְעִיתֶֽךָ׃	(Maschil of Asaph.) O God, why hast thou cast us off for ever? why doth thine anger smoke against the sheep of thy pasture?	Συνέσεως τῷ ᾿Ασάφ. - ΙΝΑΤΙ ἀπώσω, ὁ Θεός, εἰς τέλος; ὠργίσθη ὁ θυμός σου ἐπὶ πρόβατα νομῆς σου;
2	זְכֹ֤ר עֲדָֽתְךָ֨ ׀ קָ֘נִ֤יתָ קֶּ֗דֶם גָּ֭אַלְתָּ שֵׁ֣בֶט נַחֲלָתֶ֑ךָ הַר־צִ֝יּ֗וֹן זֶ֤ה ׀ שָׁכַ֬נְתָּ בּֽוֹ׃	Remember thy congregation, which thou hast purchased of old; the rod of thine inheritance, which thou hast redeemed; this mount Zion, wherein thou hast dwelt.	μνήσθητι τῆς συναγωγῆς σου, ἧς ἐκτήσω ἀπ᾿ ἀρχῆς· ἐλυτρώσω ῥάβδον κληρονομίας σου, ὄρος Σιὼν τοῦτο, ὃ κατεσκήνωσας ἐν αὐτῷ.
3	הָרִ֣ימָה פְ֭עָמֶיךָ לְמַשֻּׁא֣וֹת נֶ֑צַח כׇּל־הֵרַ֖ע אוֹיֵ֣ב בַּקֹּֽדֶשׁ׃	Lift up thy feet unto the perpetual desolations; even all that the enemy hath done wickedly in the sanctuary.	ἔπαρον τὰς χεῖράς σου ἐπὶ τὰς ὑπερηφανίας αὐτῶν εἰς τέλος, ὅσα ἐπονηρεύσατο ὁ ἐχθρὸς ἐν τοῖς ἁγίοις σου.
4	שָׁאֲג֣וּ צֹ֭רְרֶיךָ בְּקֶ֣רֶב מוֹעֲדֶ֑ךָ שָׂ֖מוּ אוֹתֹתָ֣ם אֹתֽוֹת׃	Thine enemies roar in the midst of thy congregations; they set up their ensigns for signs.	καὶ ἐνεκαυχήσαντο οἱ μισοῦντές σε ἐν μέσῳ τῆς ἑορτῆς σου, ἔθεντο τὰ σημεῖα αὐτῶν σημεῖα καὶ οὐκ ἔγνωσαν.
5	יִ֭וָּדַע כְּמֵבִ֣יא לְמָ֑עְלָה בִּסְבׇךְ־עֵ֝֗ץ קַרְדֻּמּֽוֹת׃	A man was famous according as he had lifted up axes upon the thick trees.	ὡς εἰς τὴν ἔξοδον ὑπεράνω,
6	(ועת) [וְ֭עַתָּה] פִּתּוּחֶ֣יהָ יָּ֑חַד בְּכַשִּׁ֥יל וְ֝כֵילַפּ֗וֹת יַהֲלֹמֽוּן׃	But now they break down the carved work thereof at once with axes and hammers.	ὡς ἐν δρυμῷ ξύλων ἀξίναις ἐξέκοψαν τὰς θύρας αὐτῆς ἐπὶ τὸ αὐτὸ ἐν πελέκει καὶ λαξευτηρίῳ κατέρραξαν αὐτήν.
7	שִׁלְח֣וּ בָ֭אֵשׁ מִקְדָּשֶׁ֑ךָ לָ֝אָ֗רֶץ חִלְּל֥וּ מִֽשְׁכַּן־שְׁמֶֽךָ׃	They have cast fire into thy sanctuary, they have defiled by casting down the dwelling place of thy name to the ground.	ἐνεπύρισαν ἐν πυρὶ τὸ ἁγιαστήριόν σου, εἰς τὴν γῆν ἐβεβήλωσαν τὸ σκήνωμα τοῦ ὀνόματός σου.
8	אָמְר֣וּ בְ֭לִבָּם נִינָ֣ם יָ֑חַד שָׂרְפ֖וּ כׇל־מוֹעֲדֵי־אֵ֣ל בָּאָֽרֶץ׃	They said in their hearts, Let us destroy them together: they have burned up all the synagogues of God in the land.	εἶπαν ἐν τῇ καρδίᾳ αὐτῶν αἱ συγγένειαι αὐτῶν ἐπὶ τὸ αὐτό· δεῦτε καὶ καταπαύσωμεν πάσας τὰς ἑορτὰς τοῦ Θεοῦ ἀπὸ τῆς γῆς.
9	אוֹתֹתֵ֗ינוּ לֹ֥א רָ֫אִ֥ינוּ אֵֽין־ע֥וֹד נָבִ֑יא וְלֹֽא־אִ֝תָּ֗נוּ יֹדֵ֥עַ עַד־מָֽה׃	We see not our signs: there is no more any prophet: neither is there among us any that knoweth how long.	τὰ σημεῖα αὐτῶν οὐκ εἴδομεν, οὐκ ἔστιν ἔτι προφήτης, καὶ ἡμᾶς οὐ γνώσεται ἔτι.
10	עַד־מָתַ֣י אֱ֭לֹהִים יְחָ֣רֶף צָ֑ר יְנָ֘אֵ֤ץ אוֹיֵ֖ב שִׁמְךָ֣ לָנֶֽצַח׃	O God, how long shall the adversary reproach? shall the enemy blaspheme thy name for ever?	ἕως πότε, ὁ Θεός, ὀνειδιεῖ ὁ ἐχθρός, παροξυνεῖ ὁ ὑπεναντίος τὸ ὄνομά σου εἰς τέλος;
11	לָ֤מָּה תָשִׁ֣יב יָ֭דְךָ וִימִינֶ֑ךָ מִקֶּ֖רֶב (חוקך) [חֵיקְךָ֣] כַלֵּֽה׃	Why withdrawest thou thy hand, even thy right hand? pluck it out of thy bosom.	ἱνατί ἀποστρέφεις τὴν χεῖρά σου καὶ τὴν δεξιάν σου ἐκ μέσου τοῦ κόλπου σου εἰς τέλος;
12	וֵ֭אלֹהִים מַלְכִּ֣י מִקֶּ֑דֶם פֹּעֵ֥ל יְ֝שׁוּע֗וֹת בְּקֶ֣רֶב הָאָֽרֶץ׃	For God is my King of old, working salvation in the midst of the earth.	ὁ δὲ Θεὸς βασιλεὺς ἡμῶν πρὸ αἰώνων, εἰργάσατο σωτηρίαν ἐν μέσῳ τῆς γῆς.
13	אַתָּ֤ה פוֹרַ֣רְתָּ בְעׇזְּךָ֣ יָ֑ם שִׁבַּ֖רְתָּ רָאשֵׁ֥י תַ֝נִּינִ֗ים עַל־הַמָּֽיִם׃	Thou didst divide the sea by thy strength: thou brakest the heads of the dragons in the waters.	σὺ ἐκραταίωσας ἐν τῇ δυνάμει σου τὴν θάλασσαν, σὺ συνέτριψας τὰς κεφαλὰς τῶν δρακόντων ἐπὶ τοῦ ὕδατος.
14	אַתָּ֣ה רִ֭צַּצְתָּ רָאשֵׁ֣י לִוְיָתָ֑ן תִּתְּנֶ֥נּוּ מַ֝אֲכָ֗ל לְעָ֣ם לְצִיִּֽים׃	Thou brakest the heads of leviathan in pieces, and gavest him to be meat to the people inhabiting the wilderness.	σὺ συνέθλασας τὰς κεφαλὰς τοῦ δράκοντος, ἔδωκας αὐτὸν βρῶμα λαοῖς τοῖς Αἰθίοψι.
15	אַתָּ֣ה בָ֭קַעְתָּ מַעְיָ֣ן וָנָ֑חַל אַתָּ֥ה ה֝וֹבַ֗שְׁתָּ נַהֲר֥וֹת אֵיתָֽן׃	Thou didst cleave the fountain and the flood: thou driedst up mighty rivers.	σὺ διέρρηξας πηγὰς καὶ χειμάρρους, σὺ ἐξήρανας ποταμοὺς ᾿Ηθάμ.
16	לְךָ֣ י֭וֹם אַף־לְךָ֥ לָ֑יְלָה אַתָּ֥ה הֲ֝כִינ֗וֹתָ מָא֥וֹר וָשָֽׁמֶשׁ׃	The day is thine, the night also is thine: thou hast prepared the light and the sun.	σή ἐστιν ἡ ἡμέρα, καὶ σή ἐστιν ἡ νύξ, σὺ κατηρτίσω φαῦσιν καὶ ἥλιον.
17	אַתָּ֣ה הִ֭צַּבְתָּ כׇּל־גְּבוּל֣וֹת אָ֑רֶץ קַ֥יִץ וָ֝חֹ֗רֶף אַתָּ֥ה יְצַרְתָּֽם׃	Thou hast set all the borders of the earth: thou hast made summer and winter.	σὺ ἐποίησας πάντα τὰ ὡραῖα τῆς γῆς· θέρος καὶ ἔαρ, σὺ ἔπλασας αὐτά.
18	זְכׇר־זֹ֗את א֭וֹיֵב חֵרֵ֣ף ׀ יְהֹוָ֑ה וְעַ֥ם נָ֝בָ֗ל נִאֲצ֥וּ שְׁמֶֽךָ׃	Remember this, that the enemy hath reproached, O LORD, and that the foolish people have blasphemed thy name.	μνήσθητι ταύτης· ἐχθρὸς ὠνείδισε τὸν Κύριον, καὶ λαὸς ἄφρων παρώξυνε τὸ ὄνομά σου.
19	אַל־תִּתֵּ֣ן לְ֭חַיַּת נֶ֣פֶשׁ תּוֹרֶ֑ךָ חַיַּ֥ת עֲ֝נִיֶּ֗יךָ אַל־תִּשְׁכַּ֥ח לָנֶֽצַח׃	O deliver not the soul of thy turtledove unto the multitude of the wicked: forget not the congregation of thy poor for ever.	μὴ παραδῷς τοῖς θηρίοις ψυχὴν ἐξομολογουμένην σοι, τῶν ψυχῶν τῶν πενήτων σου μὴ ἐπιλάθῃ εἰς τέλος.
20	הַבֵּ֥ט לַבְּרִ֑ית כִּ֥י מָלְא֥וּ מַחֲשַׁכֵּי־אֶ֝֗רֶץ נְא֣וֹת חָמָֽס׃	Have respect unto the covenant: for the dark places of the earth are full of the habitations of cruelty.	ἐπίβλεψον εἰς τὴν διαθήκην σου, ὅτι ἐπληρώθησαν οἱ ἐσκοτισμένοι τῆς γῆς οἴκων ἀνομιῶν.
21	אַל־יָשֹׁ֣ב דַּ֣ךְ נִכְלָ֑ם עָנִ֥י וְ֝אֶבְי֗וֹן יְֽהַלְל֥וּ שְׁמֶֽךָ׃	O let not the oppressed return ashamed: let the poor and needy praise thy name.	μὴ ἀποστραφήτω τεταπεινωμένος καὶ κατῃσχυμένος· πτωχὸς καὶ πένης αἰνέσουσι τὸ ὄνομά σου.
22	קוּמָ֣ה אֱ֭לֹהִים רִיבָ֣ה רִיבֶ֑ךָ זְכֹ֥ר חֶרְפָּתְךָ֥ מִנִּי־נָ֝בָ֗ל כׇּל־הַיּֽוֹם׃	Arise, O God, plead thine own cause: remember how the foolish man reproacheth thee daily.	ἀνάστα, ὁ Θεός, δίκασον τὴν δίκην σου· μνήσθητι τοῦ ὀνειδισμοῦ σου τοῦ ὑπὸ ἄφρονος ὅλην τὴν ἡμέραν.
23	אַל־תִּ֭שְׁכַּח ק֣וֹל צֹרְרֶ֑יךָ שְׁא֥וֹן קָ֝מֶ֗יךָ עֹלֶ֥ה תָמִֽיד׃	Forget not the voice of thine enemies: the tumult of those that rise up against thee increaseth continually.	μὴ ἐπιλάθῃ τῆς φωνῆς τῶν ἱκετῶν σου· ἡ ὑπερηφανία τῶν μισούντων σε ἀνέβη διὰ παντός.
