= Ohio University Marching 110 =

College marching band in Athens, Ohio

The Ohio University Marching 110
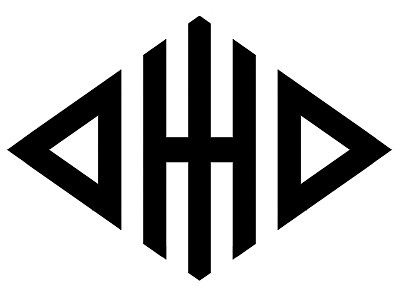
- The "Diamond Ohio" logo.
- Nickname: The 110, The Marching 110, The Most Exciting Band In The Land
- School: Ohio University
- Location: Athens, Ohio
- Conference: Mid-American Conference
- Founded: 1923
- Director: Richard Suk
- Assistant Director: Justin McCrary
- Members: ~250
- Practice field: Hurley Field (to be completed in 2026)
- Fight song: "Stand Up and Cheer!"
- Motto: Better Than The Best Ever
- Website: https://www.ohio.edu/marching-110

Ohio University Marching 110 is the official marching band of Ohio University in Athens, Ohio, founded in 1923. The nickname Marching 110 is a reference to the band's original number of members. The current band consists of ~250 members. It represents the university at various athletic functions and other events, including over 40 NFL halftime shows.

== History ==
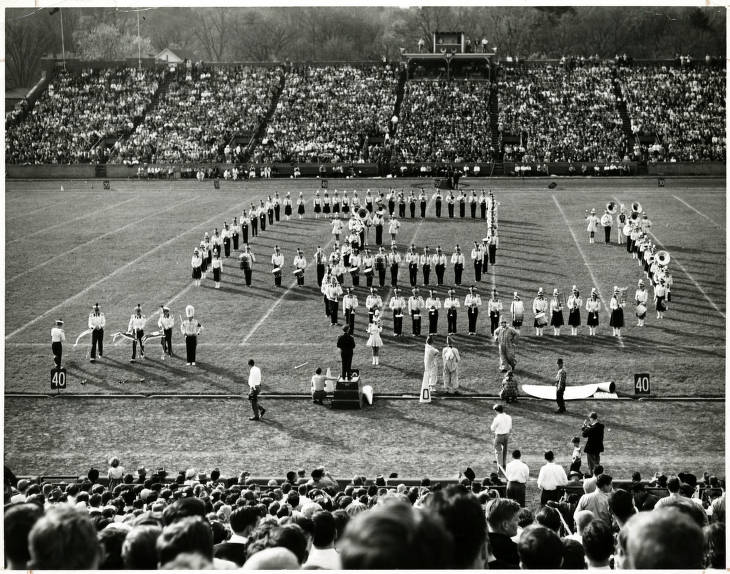
Early 1960 picture of the Ohio University Marching Band, during halftime in Peden Stadium.

=== 1923-1966: Formation and initial incarnation ===
In 1923, a student by the name of Homer Baird organized over 40 musicians into the first marching band at Ohio University. Baird arranged for a local music teacher, Raymond Connett, to direct the band for free. Baird was quoted as saying, "Fortunately, we had at least 25 top-notch musicians and the others were coming along fine." Enough money was raised to furnish the band with about 30 blue coats and white caps, while the members had to buy their own white trousers.

During the football season, the town of Athens raised enough money to send the band and football team on a special train to play Ohio Wesleyan on their homecoming day. After the game, the Ohio Wesleyan fans stated "that [Ohio] was the best band that had been on their gridiron that year."

In 1926, John Hollingsworth Gill became director. Under his direction, the band marched in its first Homecoming parade.

In 1929, Curtis Janssen became the director and arranged the Ohio University Alma Mater. Janssen also established an all-girls band, which was disbanded after his departure in 1945. The band, along with the football team, was suspended from 1943-45 due to World War II.

In 1946, Professor Dan Martino took up the baton. Martino's tenure was short-lived, as he departed the post in 1947. Professor Charles Gilbert then became director. Gilbert and his assistant, William Brophy, reestablished the all-girls band along with majorettes. The band would also record its first album during Gilbert's tenure.

In 1950, the Ohio University Marching Band was a female-only band while many of the men were off at war. Charles Minelli took over the direction of the Ohio University Marching Band in 1951 and held the baton until 1966.

=== 1967-present: The "Big Switch" and modern era ===
In 1967, Gene Thrailkill became the director of bands at Ohio University. Thrailkill introduced a new, high-energy marching style and a new uniform, both of which remain staples of the Marching 110 today. Along with the style switch, Thrailkill controversially removed all women and majorettes from the band. The first drum major of the new-look "Marching Men of Ohio" was Bill Fay, and the twirler was David Fowler.

In 1968, Fowler became drum major and instituted one of the 110's first dance routines, performed to "Ain't Been Good." The dance is still performed today. Fowler remained drum major until 1970. The band has not had a drum major since Fowler's departure, with on-field leadership becoming the responsibility of the Field Commander.

Dr. Thomas Lee became director in 1971. Upon Lee's departure in 1973, Ronald Socciarelli became director. Several notable traditions began during Socciarelli's tenure, including the addition of "Long Train Runnin'" and "Cheer" to the band's dance numbers. The band also began to perform its annual show at the Ohio Theatre in Columbus in 1974.

In 1975, women were re-admitted to the band by Socciarelli and have remained so. With the change, the band adopted its current name. The Marching 110 also became the first collegiate marching band to perform in Carnegie Hall in 1976, marking one of their first prominent performances.

In 1990, Sylvester Young became the Marching 110's director. Under his leadership, the band represented the state of Ohio in the 1993 inaugural parade for President Bill Clinton.

Dr. Richard Suk became director in 1996. During his tenure, the band has performed in three Macy's Thanksgiving Day Parades (2000, 2005, and 2017), several NFL games, the 2010 Tournament of Roses Parade, and internationally in Dublin, Ireland, St. Peter's Square in Vatican City, and in London as part of the 2024 London Band Week.

In 2023, the Ohio University Marching Band celebrated its 100th anniversary.

In 2025, the Marching 110 celebrated 50 years of women's readmittance to the band. Celebrations included many halftime shows featuring female artists, including the "Latina Divas", Lady Gaga, Ariana Grande, and the Pop Show performances.

In 2026, the Marching 110 placed 1st as America’s best college marching band in the 2026 USA TODAY Sports Readers’ Choice Awards.

=== Going viral ===
On October 1, 2011, the Marching 110 performed "Party Rock Anthem" by LMFAO as the dance chart to conclude its halftime show. A video of the performance was uploaded to YouTube, and within days had accumulated more than 1 million views. The video earned the Marching 110 worldwide recognition and was featured on many prominent websites, including ESPN and CNN. To date, the video has reached almost 12 million views.

On September 22, 2012, the Marching 110 again went viral with its performance of "Gangnam Style" by Korean rapper PSY. To date, the video has been viewed more than 8,800,000 times. The clip was featured on Good Morning America and several other prominent media outlets.

== Directors (since 1966) ==
=== Gene Thrailkill ===
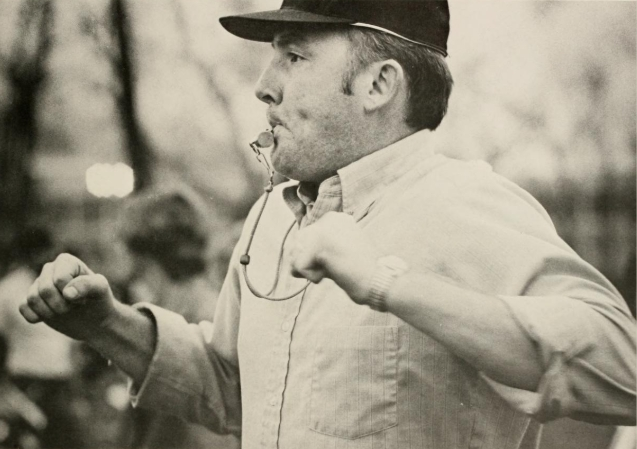
Gene Thrailkill in 1970

After arriving at Ohio University in 1966, Thrailkill initiated the biggest reform in the band's history. While he controversially removed women from the band, he ultimately hoped to increase its size to approximately 85 members. The following fall, 112 marchers were chosen to march in the new band. Thrailkill also introduced the band's signature marching style and uniforms. With popular music of the day, hard-driving marching, and a great "esprit de corps," the 110 Marching Men of Ohio became "The Most Exciting Band in the Land."

Thrailkill was also the originator of the 110's "Diamond Ohio" formation. After The Ohio State University Marching Band used "Diamond Ohio", Thrailkill adopted the formation to give the band its own trademark. Thrailkill was director of bands until 1971, when he departed to become Director of Bands at the University of Oklahoma.

Upon his retirement from the University of Oklahoma in 2001, Thrailkill returned to Ohio during that year's Homecoming to speak and guest conduct the 110. He attended the Thursday, Friday and Saturday morning practices of the Marching 110, as well as the new OUMB Society of Alumni & Friends Display Case dedication ceremony in Memorial Auditorium.

Thrailkill died in 2021. That season, the 110 dedicated a show to him, wearing running ribbons featuring a green and red stripe to mark his time serving both at Ohio University and the University of Oklahoma. The 110 also dedicated their 2022 homecoming show to his memory.

=== Thomas Lee ===
Dr. Lee came to Ohio University in 1971 to conduct the Marching 110. Lee was also the founder and conductor of the Ohio University Wind Ensemble and received a research grant to develop an innovative approach to teaching conducting. In 1985, Lee became the director of the UCLA Wind Ensemble.

=== Ronald P. Socciarelli ===
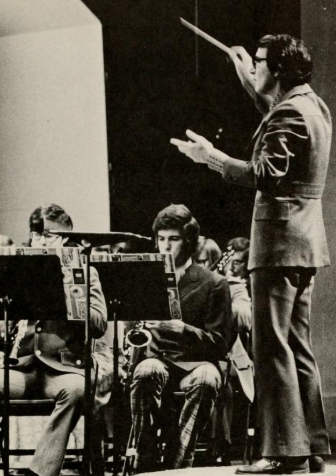
Ronald P. Socciarelli conducting the Ohio University Symphonic Band in 1973

Professor Socciarelli was the director of the Marching 110 from 1973 to 1989. Under his direction, the Marching 110, as well as the wind ensemble, toured extensively throughout the East and Midwest. The wind ensemble was selected to perform several times at the Ohio Music Education Association Conference, the national convention of the College Band Directors National Association, and the National Music Teachers Association Conference in Washington, DC.

In 1997, Socciarelli returned to speak at the annual band banquet. Then, in 2003, Socciarelli returned once again to conduct the Marching 110 and over 200 Alumni during the annual homecoming game during the celebration of Ohio University's Bicentennial, as well as speak at the annual Alumni Banquet.

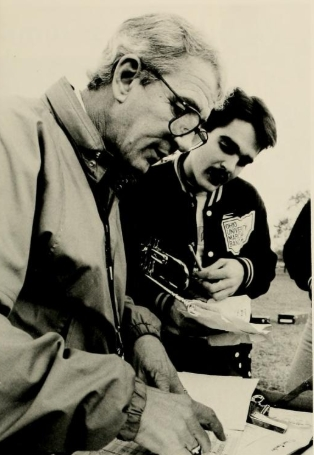
Ronald P. Socciarelli working with a student in 1988

Socciarelli died on February 2, 2012, and shortly after his death, Ohio University adopted his quote "Better Than the Best Ever" as the official theme for the 2012 Homecoming Celebrations. On October 13, over 600 Marching 110 Alumni returned to Ohio University to pay tribute to "The Man." The largest Alumni band in the history of Ohio University took to the streets of Athens during the homecoming celebration.

=== Sylvester Young ===
The Marching 110 was under Sylvester Young's direction from 1990 through 1995. Young also returned to speak at the 1997 band banquet. He would later become the director of the Florida A&M Marching 100 from 2013 through 2016.

=== Richard Suk ===
Richard Suk became director of the Marching 110 in 1996. He is also the conductor of the Symphonic Band and Varsity Band at Ohio University.

== Instrumentation ==
The band marches clarinets, trumpets, mellophones, alto and tenor saxophones, trombones and bass trombones, euphoniums, and sousaphones/tubas. The percussion section consists of eight snare drums, four timbales, four duo-tenor drums, four pitched bass drums, and four pitched cymbals.

=== Drum cadences ===
In parades, the 110 performs various dance routines to drum cadences. The following are some of the current and former drum cadences used by the 110:

- 7 & 1/2
- Out of It
- Cherry
- Funk
- Jimbo
- Tequila
- Gym Shorts
- No!
- Uncertain
- Herb (retired)
- Robbers
- Your Mother
- Two Bucks
- Cheesecake (retired)
- Grabbit
- GreenHouse

== Traditions ==
=== High Extended Chair-Step ===
In 1967, under the direction of Gene Thraikill, the band switched to a high-step style of marching. This style consisted of the thigh raised 90 degrees to the ground, the calf extended to 45 degrees, and pointed toes. With this new and unique technique, the band also added a slight twist in the upper body, giving the players a "swinging" effect referred to as "swagger". Together, they formed the Marching 110 Step that continues to be used today.

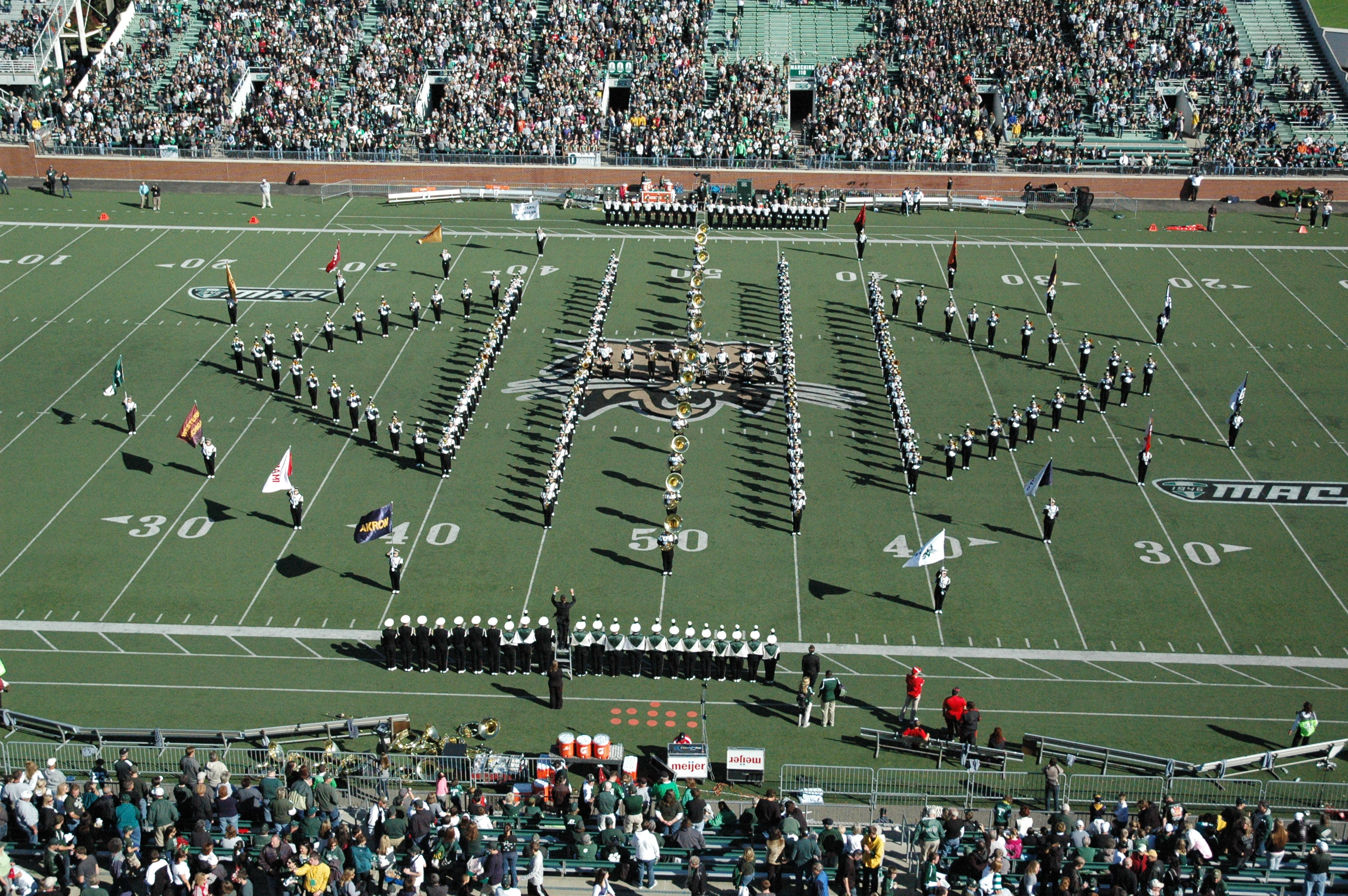
"Diamond Ohio," as performed during the 2011 season

=== Diamond Ohio ===
Originally created by The Ohio State University Marching Band, Thrailkill adopted the "Diamond Ohio" formation to give the 110 its own trademark. The formation, created by forming the O's into pointed triangles and superimposing the I over the H, is performed by the Marching 110 during its pregame show.

=== Letterman Jackets ===
One of the most prominent traditions in the Marching 110 is the donning of green letterman jackets. Since 1967, the jacket has retained the same design, with a double-striped woven collar, wrists, and waistband in a white on green scheme. The jacket itself is dark green and has two pockets as well as white buttons. The back of the jacket bears "Ohio" in block letters, and the front features a patch in the shape of Ohio with "Ohio University Marching Band" written on it. Band members place pins from various prominent performances above the front patch, as well as the insignia of any band Greek life they are involved in. Members consider the jackets sacred, and any non-members of the band are not allowed to wear them.

=== Dance Breaks ===
The Marching 110 features at least one dance break per show. Designed by designated Dance Commanders, the whole band spends time learning moves to spice up their performance. Since 1967, the band has continued the tradition after Drum Major David Fowler created the first dance routine to a 110 standard, "Ain't Been Good."

=== Field Commander ===
The Marching 110 makes use of a non-traditional Field Commander. Their main job is the maintenance of "esprit de corps" of the members, as well as teaching the unique marching style. Each year, a fourth or fifth-year member is picked after a round of interviews. The Marching 110 has not had a traditional drum major since 1970, and the departure of David Fowler.

=== Other Traditions ===
- Annual performances at the historic Ohio Theatre in Columbus, Ohio, and many previous performances at the Palace Theatre, also in Columbus, Ohio.
- Playing the hymn Salvation is Created and other songs referred to as "standards." These songs include Ain't Been Good, Light Up, Long Train Runnin', Cheer, and Train of Thought.
- The Drumline Uptown Tour takes place on the Friday night before the annual Homecoming game, where members of the Marching 110 Drumline play cadences in bars throughout Uptown Athens. In each bar, Marching 110 tubas perform Tuba Security, ensuring the safety and protection of the drumline.

== The Lawlers ==
In Emeriti Park on Ohio University’s campus, there is a stone carving of Diamond Ohio and a plaque that reads "In Memoriam 10-13-99, Jud & Frank Lawler, Marching 110 Alumni".

Jud and Frank Lawler were both members of the Marching 110, with a combined 13 years of marching. On October 13, 1999, the brothers were struck by a semi on their way home from a Lynyrd Skynyrd concert, and both died in the accident. In the days following, both the Marching 110 and Graham High School Band performed at their funeral, playing some of the brothers' favorite songs. It was reported that around 1,800 people attended their visiting hours.

The band can often be heard playing Salvation is Created (referred to by members as Salvation) in memory of Jud and Frank Lawler. Originally, it was intended as a warm-up for the ensemble, but following their death, it was dedicated to the brothers' memory. When played, any alumni and current members in the area remove their hats and sunglasses and stand in silence, paying homage to the brothers. In 2019, the Marching 110 dedicated their homecoming half-time show to the brothers, which included songs by the pair's favorite bands.

== Prominent performances ==
In addition to their annual Ohio Theatre Performance in Columbus, Ohio, the 110 has also performed for the following:

- 1968: Tangerine Bowl, Orlando
- 1976: First collegiate marching band to perform in Carnegie Hall, New York City
- 1987: US Constitution Bicentennial Parade, Philadelphia
- 1993: Bill Clinton's Inauguration Parade and ball, Washington D.C.
- 1998: Opening gala of the restored Allen Theater in Cleveland
- 2000: Macy's Thanksgiving Day Parade, New York City
- 2005: Macy's Thanksgiving Day Parade
- 2006: MAC Championship Game vs. Central Michigan, Detroit
- 2006: 15 members of the Marching 110 appeared as surprise guests on the NBC game show Deal or No Deal
- 2007: GMAC Bowl vs. Southern Mississippi, Mobile, Alabama
- 2009: MAC Championship Game vs. Central Michigan, Detroit
- 2009: Little Caesars Pizza Bowl vs. Marshall, Detroit
- 2010: 121st Tournament of Roses Parade, Pasadena, California
- 2010: R+L Carriers New Orleans Bowl vs. Troy, New Orleans
- 2011: MAC Championship Game vs. Northern Illinois, Detroit
- 2011: 77 members of the Marching 110 traveled to the Famous Idaho Potato Bowl vs. Utah State, Boise, Idaho
- 2012: AdvoCare V100 Independence Bowl vs. Louisiana-Monroe, Shreveport, Louisiana
- 2013: Europe Tour - Performed in Dublin, Ireland, and St. Peter's Square in Vatican City
- 2013: Beef O' Brady's Bowl vs. East Carolina, St. Petersburg, Florida
- 2015: Camellia Bowl vs. Appalachian State, Montgomery, Alabama
- 2016: France Tour - Omaha Beach in Normandy, the Champs-de-Mars under the Eiffel Tower, and Disneyland Paris
- 2016: MAC Championship Game vs. Western Michigan, Detroit
- 2016: Dollar General Bowl vs. Troy, Mobile
- 2017: Macy's Thanksgiving Day Parade, New York City
- 2017: 80 members of the Marching 110 traveled to the Bahamas Bowl vs. UAB, Nassau, Bahamas
- 2018: Frisco Bowl vs. San Diego State, Frisco, Texas
- 2019: 82 members of the Marching 110 traveled to the Famous Idaho Potato Bowl vs Nevada, Boise
- 2022: MAC Championship Game vs. Toledo Rockets football, Detroit
- 2022: Members of the Marching 110 traveled to the Arizona Bowl vs. Wyoming, Tucson, Arizona
- 2023: Members of the Marching 110 traveled to the Myrtle Beach Bowl vs. Georgia Southern, Conway, South Carolina
- 2024: Members of the Marching 110 traveled to London, England to participate in London Band Week, performing at Tower Bridge, Hampton Court, and in the London Tattoo at Excel London.
- 2024: MAC Championship Game vs. Miami Redhawks, Detroit.
- 2024: Members of the Marching 110 traveled to the Cure Bowl vs. Jacksonville State in Orlando.
- 2025: Members of the Marching 110 traveled to the Frisco Bowl vs. UNLV football in Frisco.
