= Salmo 150 =

Psalm setting by Ernani Aguiar

- by Ernani Aguiar
- Text: Psalm 150
- Language: Latin
- Composed: 1975
- Published: 1993
- Scoring: SATB choir

Salmo 150 (Psalm 150) is a psalm setting by Ernani Aguiar. He wrote the composition, setting Psalm 150 in Latin for unaccompanied choir, in 1975. The short work was published by Earthsongs in the U.S. in 1993, and achieved international popularity.

== History ==
Psalm 150, the final psalm of the Book of Psalms, calls to praise God in music, listing nine types of instruments. It is also called "the musicians' psalm". It has inspired composers such as Anton Bruckner, Cesar Franck and Igor Stravinsky, and Benjamin Britten.

The Brazilian composer Ernani Aguiar, who has been active also as conductor, professor, and musicologist, composed Salmo 150 in 1975 for choir a cappella, as a setting in Latin of Psalm 150, beginning "Laudate Dominum in sanctis eius". It was published by the U.S. publisher Earthsongs in 1993, edited by Maria Guinand, in two versions, for mixed choir (SATB) and for high voices (SSA). The work, which takes about 1 1/2 minutes to perform, became one of Aguiar's most popular compositions, described as likely the most frequently performed choral work from Brazil in the U.S..

== Music ==
The composition in one movement is in 12/8 time and marked Allegro con brio. The music has been described as rhythmic and energetic.

== Performance and recording ==
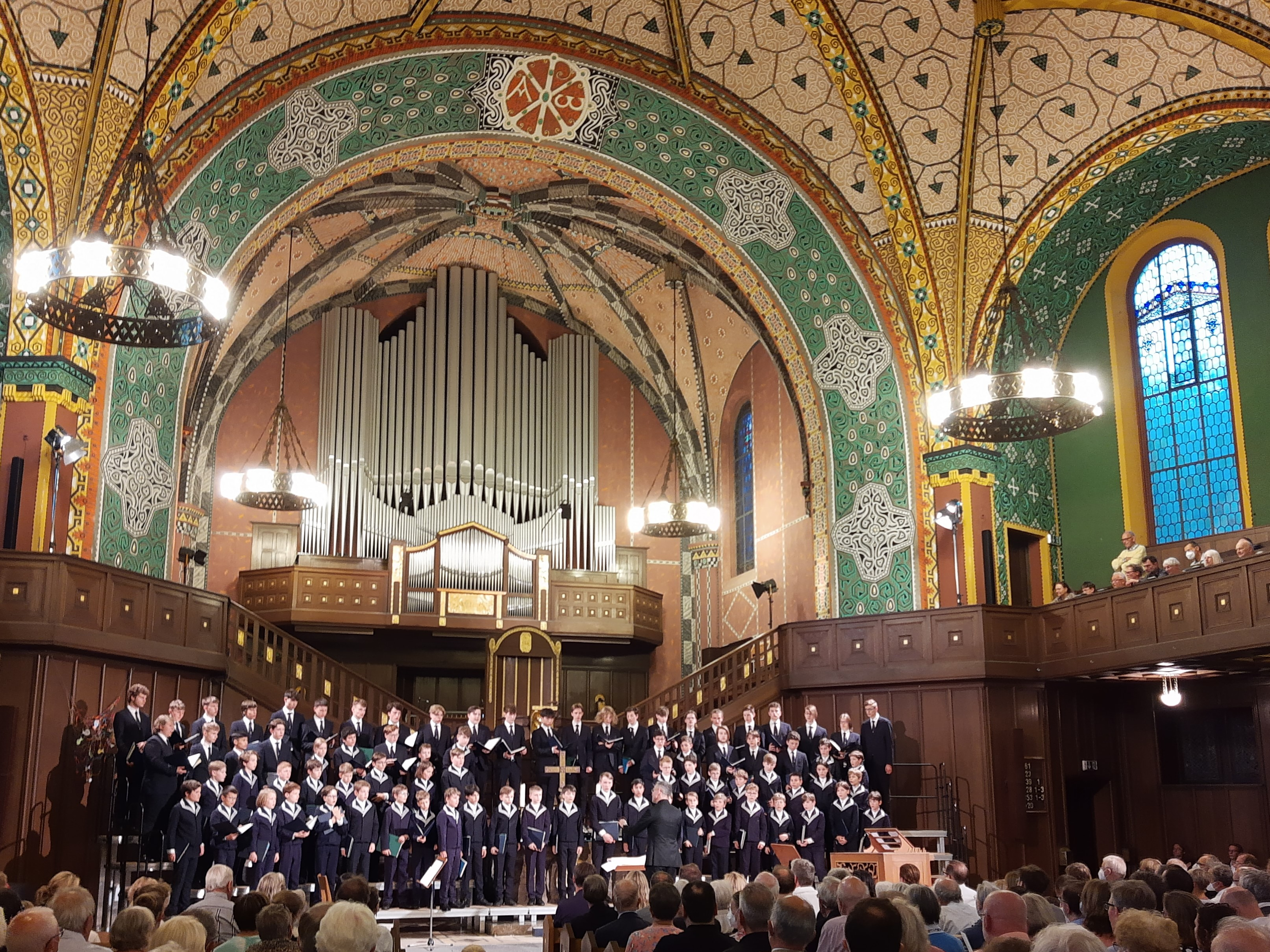
Thomanerchor at Lutherkirche, Wiesbaden, 2022

Salmo 150 was part of a 2008 album of Christmas Music, Lux Beatissima, sung by the Constant chamber choir conducted by Harald Jers. Andreas Reize, Bach's 18th successor as Thomaskantor conducting the Thomanerchor, chose Salmo 150 as the opening piece for the choir's concert as part of the choral festival Deutsches Chorfest 2022 at the Thomaskirche and broadcast by Deutschlandfunk. It opened also his first summer program with the choir, called Salmo!. It was presented at the Thomaskirche, and on a tour to the Merseburg Cathedral and at the Lutherkirche in Wiesbaden as part of the Rheingau Musik Festival, among others.
