= Psalm 150 =

150th psalm of the book of psalms

- Praise ye the LORD.
- Hymn psalm
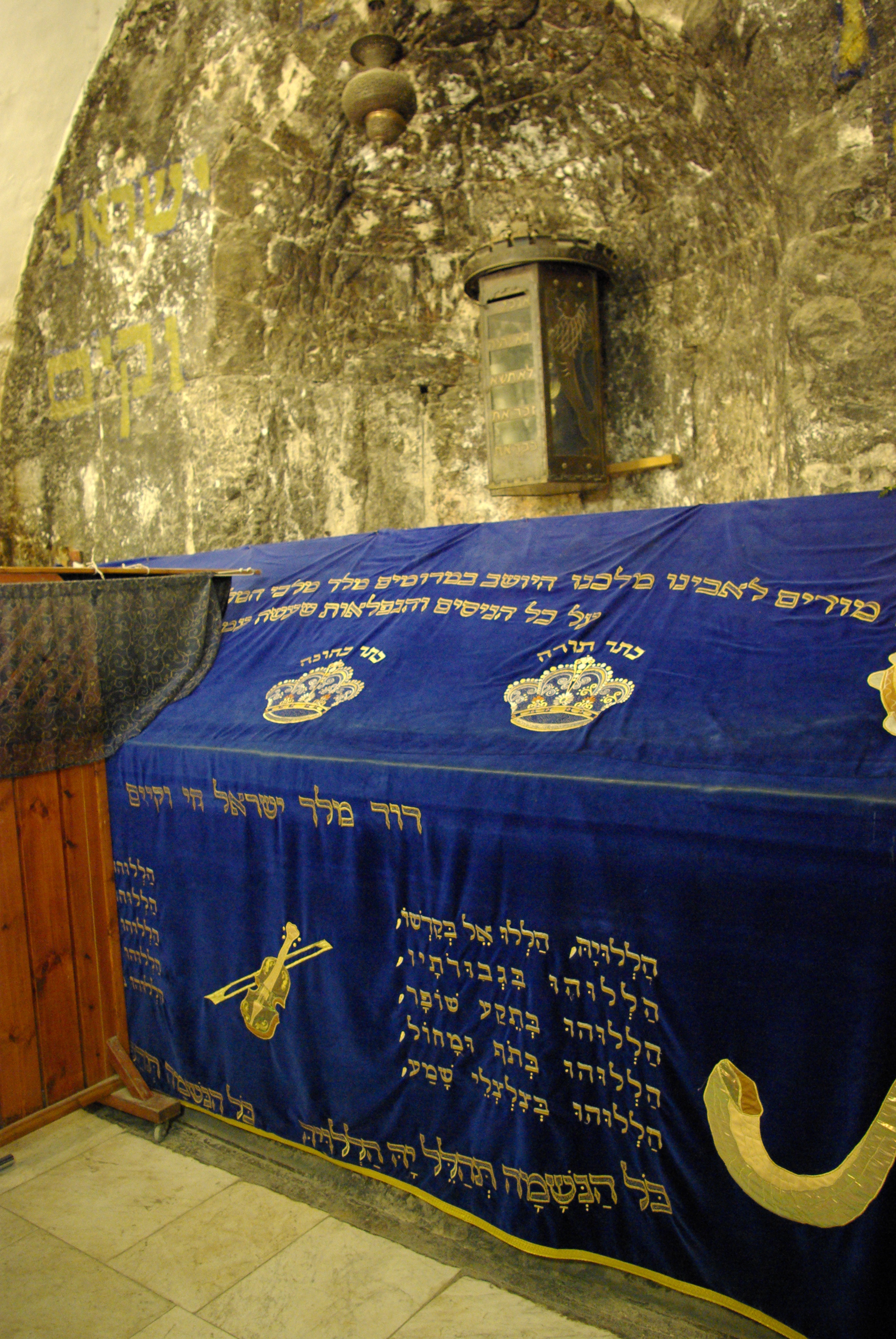
- Psalm 150 embroidered in Hebrew on David's Tomb
- Other name: Laudate Dominum in sanctis eius
- Language: Hebrew (original)

Psalm 150
- ← Psalm 149 Psalm 151 →
- Book: Book of Psalms

Psalm 150 is the 150th and final psalm of the Book of Psalms, beginning in English in the King James Version: "Praise ye the LORD. Praise God in his sanctuary". In Latin, it is known as "Laudate Dominum in sanctis eius". In Psalm 150, the psalmist urges the congregation to praise God with music and dancing, naming nine types of musical instruments.

In most versions of the Bible, the Book of Psalms has 150 psalms and Psalm 150 is the final one. However, that is not the case in the Eastern Orthodox and Syriac Orthodox canons, which have 151 and 155 psalms respectively.

The Jerusalem Bible describes Psalm 150 as a "final chorus of praise". It is a hymn psalm, forming a regular part of Jewish, Catholic, Lutheran, Anglican and other Protestant liturgies. As one of the Laudate psalms, it was part of the Lauds, a Catholic morning service. It has been paraphrased in hymns and has often been set to music. Composers have written settings throughout the centuries, in various languages, including Bruckner's German setting, Psalm 150, from 1892; the third movement of Stravinsky's Symphony of Psalms in Latin; and the third movement, Tehillim, in Hebrew in the Gloria by Karl Jenkins in 2010.

== Background and themes ==
Like Psalms 146, 147, 148, and 149, Psalm 150 begins and ends in Hebrew with the word Hallelujah. Further, David Guzik notes that each of the five books of Psalms ends with a doxology (i.e., a benediction), with Psalm 150 representing the conclusion of the fifth book as well as the conclusion of the entire work, in a more elaborate manner than the concluding verses which close the other books, e.g. Psalm 41:13:Blessed be the Lord God of Israel, From everlasting to everlasting! Amen and Amen.

Matthew Henry notes that this final psalm parallels the first psalm in that they have the same number of verses.

According to the Kabbalah, the ten expressions of praise in this psalm correspond to the ten sefirot (divine emanations). Additionally, the word hallel (Hebrew: הלל, praise) can be found thirteen times in the psalm, correlating to the Thirteen Attributes of Mercy. The directive hallelu (Hebrew: הללו, "you praise") is seen twelve times, corresponding to the twelve new moons that occur in a Hebrew calendar year. When this psalm is recited during the Jewish prayer service (see below), verse 6 is repeated, adding a thirteenth expression of hallelu which alludes to the thirteenth new moon in a leap year.

Psalm 150 names nine types of musical instruments to be used in praise of God. While the exact translation of some of these instruments is unknown, the Jewish commentators have identified the shofar, lyre, harp, drum, organ, flute, cymbal, and trumpet. Saint Augustine observes that all human faculties are used in producing music from these instruments: "The breath is employed in blowing the trumpet; the fingers are used in striking the strings of the psaltery and the harp; the whole hand is exerted in beating the timbrel; the feet move in the dance".

== Uses ==
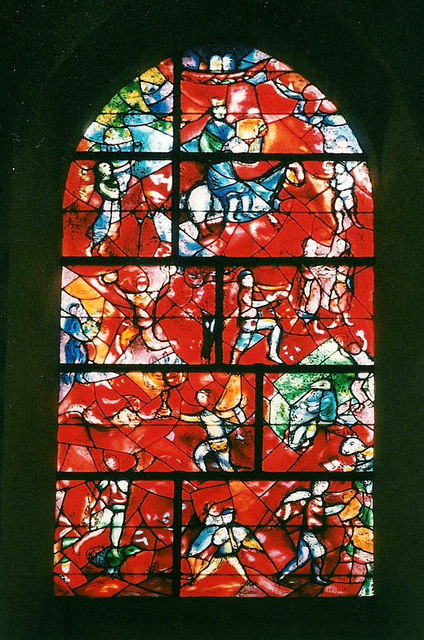
Chagall window at Chichester Cathedral, based on Psalm 150

=== Judaism ===
Psalm 150 is the fifth of five consecutive psalms (Psalms 146, 147, 148, 149, and 150) which comprise the main part of Pesukei dezimra in the daily morning service. When recited in this prayer, verse 6 is repeated, indicating the conclusion of the main part of Pesukei dezimra. This repetition of the final verse, which concludes the entire Book of Psalms, mirrors the way the final verse at the end of a Book of the Torah is repeated during the Torah reading in the synagogue.

The entire psalm is recited during the Shofarot section of the Mussaf Amidah on Rosh Hashanah, and during Kiddush Levanah.

Verse 3 is included in a piyyut recited by the Hazzan and congregation on the first day of Rosh Hashanah when that day coincides with a Shabbat, and on the second day when the first day is not on the Sabbath.

In Perek Shirah, an ancient Jewish text that ascribes scriptural verses to each element of creation as their way of praising God, the spider says verse 5 of this psalm and the rat says verse 6.

Psalm 150 is one of the ten psalms of the Tikkun HaKlali of Rebbe Nachman of Breslov.

=== Catholicism ===
Psalm 150 is one of the Laudate psalms, the others being Psalm 148 (Laudate Dominum) and Psalm 149 (Cantate Domino). All three were traditionally sung, in the sequence 148, 149 and 150, during Lauds, a morning service from the canonical hours.

=== Book of Common Prayer ===
In the Church of England's Book of Common Prayer, this psalm is appointed to be read on the evening of the thirtieth day of the month.

=== Coptic Orthodox Church ===
Psalms 148, 149 and 150 together constitute the fourth Hoos (or fourth Canticle) of the Tasbeha, the Midnight Praise of the Coptic Orthodox Church.

Psalm 150 is also chanted at the end of the liturgy, during the distribution of the Eucharist.

== Musical settings ==
With its focus on musical instruments, Psalm 150 has been called "the musicians' psalm", and also "praise beyond words". It has inspired many composers to musical settings, from paraphrasing hymns to use in extended symphonic works:

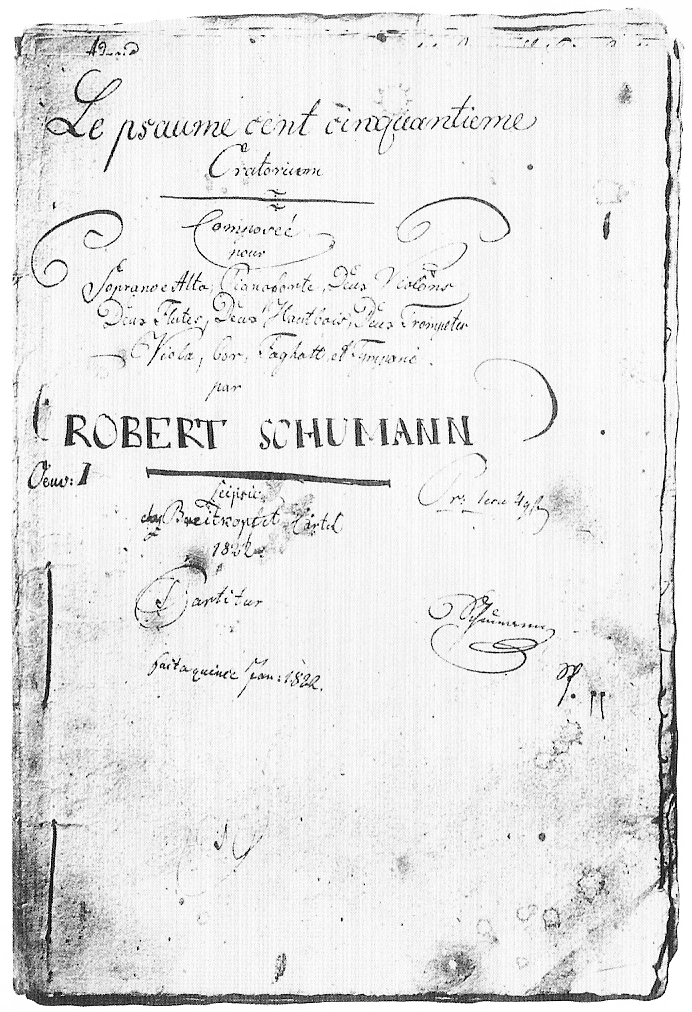
Original cover page of "Psalm 150 for Choir and Orchestra" by Robert Schumann

- Jan Dismas Zelenka – motet Chvalte Boha silného ZWV 165 (Psalm 150 according to the Kralice Bible) for bass, instruments & continuo in G major (c. 1725)
- Johann Sebastian Bach – motet Singet dem Herrn ein neues Lied, verses 2 and 6 (c. 1727)
- Robert Schumann – Psalm 150 for choir and orchestra (1822) = RSW:Anh:I10. (bearing his own note: “oldest completely finished work”)
- Felix Mendelssohn – in Lobgesang, Op. 52 (Alles, was Odem hat, lobe den Herrn)
- Charles-Valentin Alkan – Prélude Op. 31 No. 5 Psaume 150me
- Anton Bruckner — Psalm 150 Halleluja. Lobet den Herrn in seinem Heiligthum WAB 38 (1892)
- César Franck – Psalm 150
- Zoltán Kodály – Geneva Psalm 150
- Louis Lewandowski – Halleluyah (Psalm 150)
- Edmund Rubbra – Three Psalms, Op. 61 (No. 3)
- Charles Villiers Stanford – Psalm 150: O praise God in his holiness
- Igor Stravinsky – Symphony of Psalms, third movement
- Duke Ellington – "Praise God and Dance" in the Second Sacred Concert
- Benjamin Britten – Psalm 150, Op. 67 (1962) for two-part children's voices and instruments (for upper voices)
- Gertrud Roberts composed Fantaisie after Psalm 150 in 1971
- Bertold Hummel – Psalm 150 (Hallelujah. Laudate Dominum)
- Jimmy Webb – "Psalm One-Five-O" on Words and Music
- Charles Ives – Psalm 150
- Steve Reich - Tehillim (1981)
- Alan Hovhaness - set portions, along with portions of Psalms 33 and 146, in his cantata Praise the Lord with Psaltery (1969)
- Ernani Aguiar – Salmo 150 (1975)
- P.O.D. – Psalm 150 on The Fundamental Elements of Southtown
- J. Moss – Psalm 150 on The J Moss Project
- Ronald Corp – "Psalm 150, O Praise God in His Holiness" (2007). He also set the Latin version of the same text in Laudate Dominum (2011).
- Karl Jenkins – The Psalm: Tehillim 150 in Gloria, movement 3, 2010
- VaShawn Mitchell – "Psalm 150" on Created4This (2012)

== Text ==
The following table shows the Hebrew text of the Psalm with vowels, alongside the Koine Greek text in the Septuagint, the Latin text in the Vulgate and the English translation from the King James Version. Note that the meaning can slightly differ between these versions, as the Septuagint and the Masoretic Text come from different textual traditions. (Note: A 1917 translation directly from Hebrew to English by the Jewish Publication Society can be found here or here, and an 1844 translation directly from the Septuagint by L. C. L. Brenton can be found here. Both translations are in the public domain.) In the Septuagint, this psalm is numbered Psalm 149.

#	Hebrew	English	Greek	Latin
1	הַ֥לְלוּ־יָ֨הּ ׀ הַֽלְלוּ־אֵ֥ל בְּקׇדְשׁ֑וֹ הַֽ֝לְל֗וּהוּ בִּרְקִ֥יעַ עֻזּֽוֹ׃	Praise ye the LORD. Praise God in his sanctuary: praise him in the firmament of his power.	᾿Αλληλούϊα. - ΑΙΝΕΙΤΕ τὸν Θεὸν ἐν τοῖς ἁγίοις αὐτοῦ, αἰνεῖτε αὐτὸν ἐν στερεώματι τῆς δυνάμεως αὐτοῦ·	ALLELUIA. Laudate Dominum in sanctuario eius, laudate eum in firmamento virtutis eius.
2	הַלְל֥וּהוּ בִגְבוּרֹתָ֑יו הַ֝לְל֗וּהוּ כְּרֹ֣ב גֻּדְלֽוֹ׃	Praise him for his mighty acts: praise him according to his excellent greatness.	αἰνεῖτε αὐτὸν ἐπὶ ταῖς δυναστείαις αὐτοῦ, αἰνεῖτε αὐτὸν κατὰ τὸ πλῆθος τῆς μεγαλωσύνης αὐτοῦ.	Laudate eum in magnalibus eius, laudate eum secundum multitudinem magnitudinis eius.
3	הַ֭לְלוּהוּ בְּתֵ֣קַע שׁוֹפָ֑ר הַ֝לְל֗וּהוּ בְּנֵ֣בֶל וְכִנּֽוֹר׃	Praise him with the sound of the trumpet: praise him with the psaltery and harp.	αἰνεῖτε αὐτὸν ἐν ἤχῳ σάλπιγγος, αἰνεῖτε αὐτὸν ἐν ψαλτηρίῳ καὶ κιθάρᾳ·	Laudate eum in sono tubae, laudate eum in psalterio et cithara,
4	הַ֭לְלוּהוּ בְּתֹ֣ף וּמָח֑וֹל הַֽ֝לְל֗וּהוּ בְּמִנִּ֥ים וְעֻגָֽב׃	Praise him with the timbrel and dance: praise him with stringed instruments and organs.	αἰνεῖτε αὐτὸν ἐν τυμπάνῳ καὶ χορῷ, αἰνεῖτε αὐτὸν ἐν χορδαῖς καὶ ὀργάνῳ·	laudate eum in tympano et choro, laudate eum in chordis et organo,
5	הַלְל֥וּהוּ בְצִלְצְלֵי־שָׁ֑מַע הַֽ֝לְל֗וּהוּ בְּֽצִלְצְלֵ֥י תְרוּעָֽה׃	Praise him upon the loud cymbals: praise him upon the high sounding cymbals.	αἰνεῖτε αὐτὸν ἐν κυμβάλοις εὐήχοις, αἰνεῖτε αὐτὸν ἐν κυμβάλοις ἀλαλαγμοῦ.	laudate eum in cymbalis benesonantibus, laudate eum in cymbalis iubilationis:
6	כֹּ֣ל הַ֭נְּשָׁמָה תְּהַלֵּ֥ל יָ֗הּ הַֽלְלוּ־יָֽהּ׃	Let every thing that hath breath praise the LORD. Praise ye the LORD.	πᾶσα πνοὴ αἰνεσάτω τὸν Κύριον. ἀλληλούϊα.	omne quod spirat, laudet Dominum. ALLELUIA.

=== Verse 6 ===
Let every thing that hath breath praise the LORD. Hallelujah.

According to the Midrash, the Hebrew words kol ha-neshamah (Hebrew: כל הנשמה), which literally mean "Let all souls [praise God]", can also be vowelized as kol ha-neshimah, "Let every breath [praise God]". The Midrash expounds, "For each and every breath a person takes, he must praise God". The words ha-neshamah "most commonly denotes the breath of man; but it may include all animals", says Alexander Kirkpatrick, noting that "not priests and Levites only but all Israel, not Israel only but all mankind, not all mankind only but every living thing, must join in the chorus of praise".

== Stamps ==
- Joyous Festivals 5716 Stamps of Israel, with the inscriptions on tab from Psalm 150
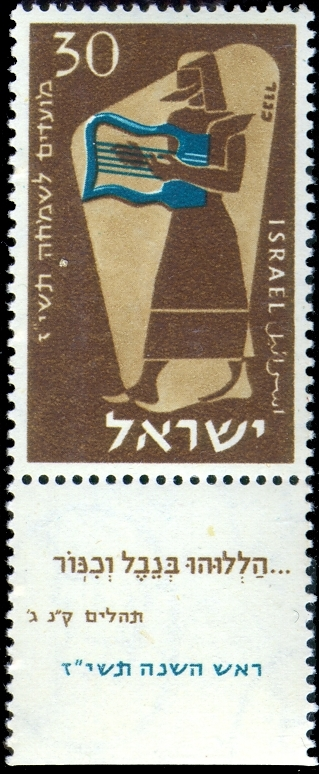
30 mil - Lyre. "Praise him with the psaltery and harp" from Psalm 150:3.

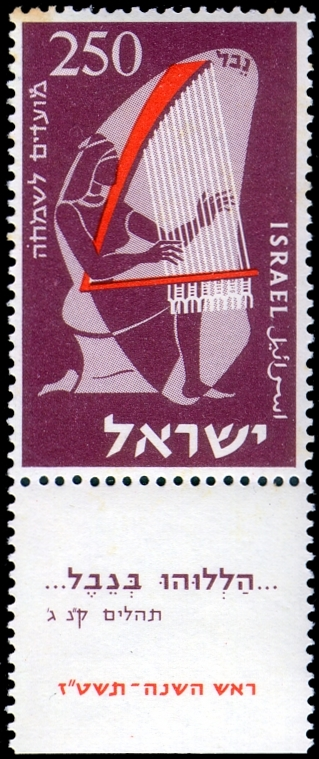
250 mil - Harp. "Praise him with the... harp" from Psalm 150:3.

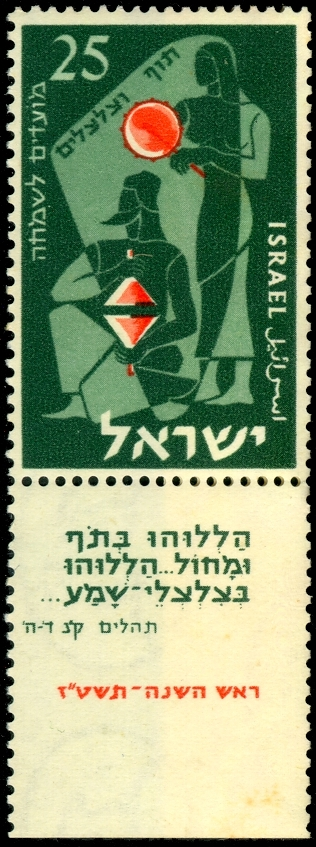
25 mil - Timbrel & Cymbal. "Praise him with the timbrel and dance... ...Praise him upon the high sounding cymbals" from Psalm 150:4,5.

== Sources ==
- Brown, Rachel Fulton (2017). Mary and the Art of Prayer: The Hours of the Virgin in Medieval Christian Life and Thought. Columbia University Press. ISBN 9780231543712.
- Heller, Marvin J. (2010). The Seventeenth Century Hebrew Book: An Abridged Thesaurus. BRILL. ISBN 9789004189560.
- Munk, Elie (2007). The World of Prayer. Vol. 1 (Revised ed.). Feldheim. ISBN 9781583306369.
- Munk, Rabbi Meir (2003). Searching for Comfort. Mesorah Publications, Ltd. ISBN 9781578197187.
- Nulman, Macy (1996). The Encyclopedia of Jewish Prayer: The Ashkenazic and Sephardic Rites. Jason Aronson. ISBN 1461631246.
- Scherman, Rabbi Nosson (2003). The Complete Artscroll Siddur (3rd ed.). Mesorah Publications, Ltd. ISBN 9780899066509.
- Scherman, Rabbi Nosson (1985). The Complete Artscroll Machzor – Rosh Hashanah (1st ed.). Mesorah Publications, Ltd. ISBN 978-0-89906-676-9.
- Wagschal, Rabbi S. (1991). The Practical Guide to Teshuvah. Targum/Feldheim. p. 53. ISBN 9780944070321.
