= Gertrud Hermine Kuenzel Roberts =

American composer and teacher (1906–1995)

Gertrud Hermine Kuenzel Roberts (22 August 1906 – 11 May 1995) was a versatile American composer, harpsichordist and teacher. She composed incidental music for theatre and film as well as performing and recording on harpsichord.

Roberts was born in Hastings, Minnesota, to Anna Maria and Gustav Kuenzel. She earned a B.A. in music from the University of Minnesota where she studied with Carlyle Scott. She also studied music at the Conservatory of Leipzig with Alfred Baresel and in Vienna with Julia Elbogen. She married Joyce Odney Roberts and they had a son and a daughter.

Roberts moved to Hawaii in 1946,where she taught and helped found the Honolulu Chamber Music Society. She received commissions from:

- Hawaii’s pineapple companies (for an industrial film)
- Honolulu Community Theatre (today known as the Diamond Head Theatre)
- Honolulu Theatre for Youth
- Saint John’s Lutheran Church (Hastings, Minnesota)
- University of Hawaii drama department.

Roberts performed as a harpsichord soloist with the Honolulu Symphony in 1975 and recorded for Ho’okani Enterprises (LP 781219) in 1979. (H) Her music was published by Island Heritage, Honolulu. Her compositions included:

== Chamber ==
- Chaconne in a minor (harpsichord)
- Charlot Suite (harpsichord)
- Christmas Chaconne (piano)
- Das kleine Buch der Bilder (harpsichord)
- Duo in E flat Major (piano)
- Gavotte (piano)
- Heritage (harpsichord)
- Laendler (harpsichord)
- Passacaille in a minor (harpsichord)
- Rondo: Homage to Couperin (harpsichord)
- Sonata for flute and harpsichord
- Three Bagatelles (harpsichord)
- Triptych (harpsichord)
- Twelve Time Gardens (piano)
- Waltz (two harpsichords)

== Incidental music for film and theatre ==
- Alice in Wonderland (text by Eva Le Gallienne)
- Pineapple Country (industrial film)
- Tempest (text by William Shakespeare)
- Thieves’ Carnival (text by Jean Anouilh)
- Yerma (text by Federico García Lorca)

== Orchestra ==
- Concerto (harpsichord and orchestra)

== Vocal ==
- Cycle for Voice and Piano
- Fantaisie after Psalm 150
- “In a Secret Garden” (soprano and harpsichord)
- “Love Unspoken” (text by Lady Nesta Oberman)
- “Yerma’s Lullaby” (voice and harpsichord)
