= Psalm 73 =

Biblical psalm

- "Truly God is good to Israel"
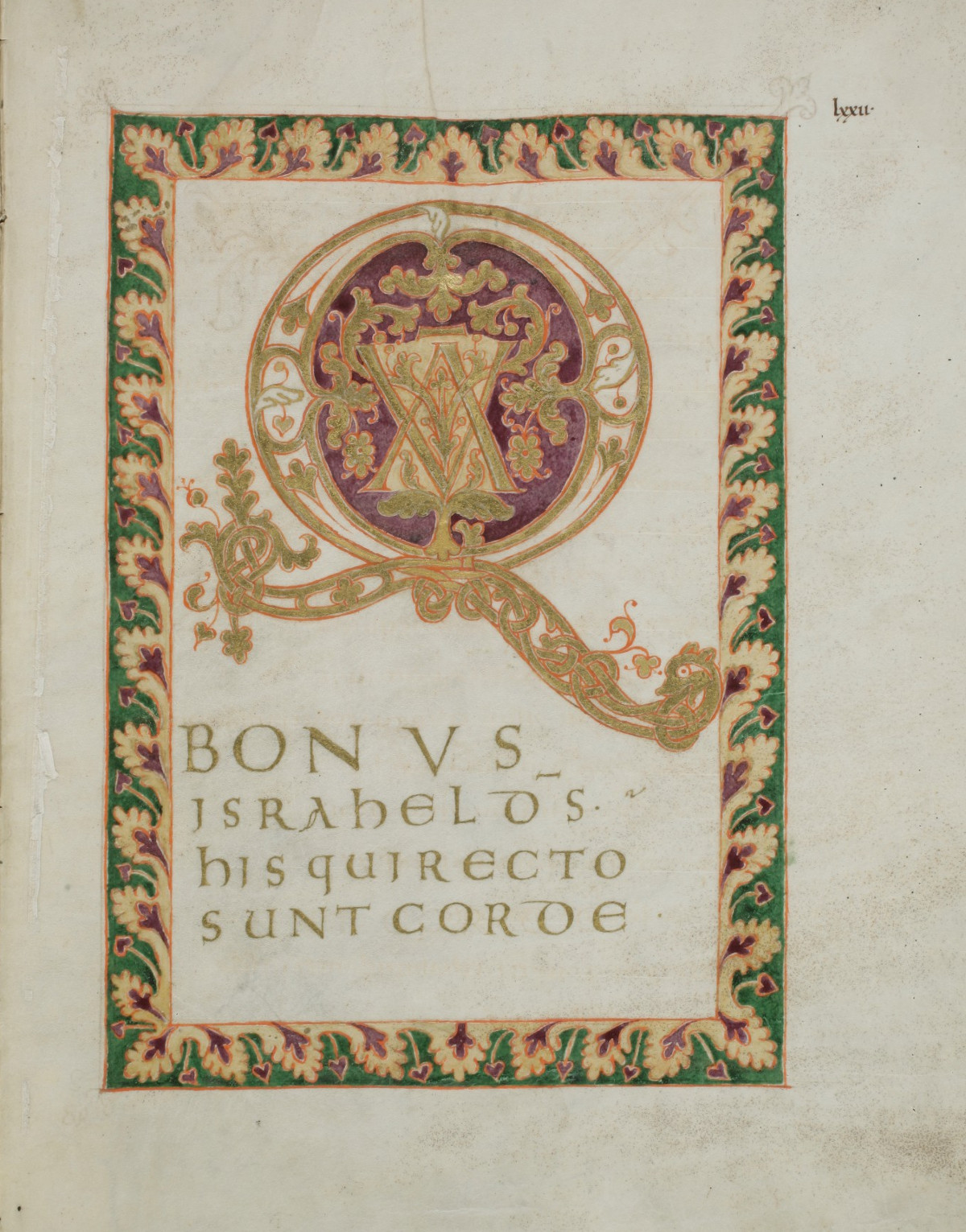
- Initial for the Gallican version of Psalm 73 from the Golden Psalter of St. Gall (c. 890).
- Other name: Psalmus 72; "Quam bonus Israhel Deus his qui recto sunt corde"
- Language: Hebrew (original)

Psalm 73
- ← Psalm 72 Psalm 74 →
- Book: Book of Psalms
- Hebrew Bible part: Ketuvim
- Order in the Hebrew part: 1
- Category: Sifrei Emet
- Christian Bible part: Old Testament
- Order in the Christian part: 19

Psalm 73 is the 73rd psalm of the Book of Psalms, beginning in English in the King James Version: "Truly God is good to Israel". In the slightly different numbering system used in the Greek Septuagint and Latin Vulgate translations of the Bible, this psalm is Psalm 72. In Latin, it is known as "Quam bonus Israhel Deus his qui recto sunt corde". Psalm 73 is the opening psalm of Book 3 of the Book of Psalms and the second of the "Psalms of Asaph". It has been categorized as one of the Wisdom Psalms", but some writers are hesitant about using this description because of its "strongly personal tone" and the references in the psalm to the temple (verses 10, his people return here, and 17, the sanctuary of God). The psalm reflects on "the Tragedy of the Wicked, and the Blessedness of Trust in God".

The psalm forms a regular part of Jewish, Catholic, Lutheran, Anglican and other Protestant liturgies. It has been set to music.

Psalm 73 serves as the introductory verse to the third book of Psalms (Psalms 73-89), commencing with the declaration, "Surely God is good to Israel." This initial sentiment stands in stark contrast to the overarching tone of the book, often referred to as 'the dark book of the Psalms.' O. Palmer Robertson characterizes the thematic focus as the devastation accompanying the overrun of Jerusalem. Despite the grim circumstances, the opening verse resolutely affirms the goodness of God towards Israel. Noteworthy is the observation that only a select few Psalms within this collection adopt an individualistic form, with a predominant emphasis on communal expressions

== Assessment ==
In the opinion of Walter Brueggemann (1984), "in the canonical structuring of the Psalter, Psalm 73 stands at its center in a crucial role. Even if the Psalm is not literarily in the center, I propose that it is centre theologically as well as canonically".

This was the favourite psalm of Martin Buber, who said about it: "What is it that so draws me to this poem that is pieced together out of description, report and confession, and draws me ever more strongly the older I become? I think it is this, that here a person reports how he attained to the true sense of his life experience and that this sense touches directly on the eternal."

== Usage ==
In the Church of England's Book of Common Prayer, this psalm is appointed to be read on the evening of the fourteenth day of the month.

== Musical settings ==
Heinrich Schütz set Psalm 73 in a metred version in German, "Dennoch hat Israel zum Trost", SWV 170, as part of the Becker Psalter, first published in 1628.

== Text ==
The following table shows the Hebrew text of the Psalm with vowels, alongside the Koine Greek text in the Septuagint and the English translation from the King James Version. Note that the meaning can slightly differ between these versions, as the Septuagint and the Masoretic Text come from different textual traditions. (Note: A 1917 translation directly from Hebrew to English by the Jewish Publication Society can be found here or here, and an 1844 translation directly from the Septuagint by L. C. L. Brenton can be found here. Both translations are in the public domain.) In the Septuagint, this psalm is numbered Psalm 72.

#	Hebrew	English	Greek
1	מִזְמ֗וֹר לְאָ֫סָ֥ף אַ֤ךְ ט֖וֹב לְיִשְׂרָאֵ֥ל אֱלֹהִ֗ים לְבָרֵ֥י לֵבָֽב׃	(A Psalm of Asaph.) Truly God is good to Israel, even to such as are of a clean heart.	Ψαλμὸς τῷ ᾿Ασάφ. - ΩΣ ΑΓΑΘΟΣ ὁ Θεὸς τῷ ᾿Ισραήλ, τοῖς εὐθέσι τῇ καρδίᾳ.
2	וַאֲנִ֗י כִּ֭מְעַט (נטוי) [נָטָ֣יוּ] רַגְלָ֑י כְּ֝אַ֗יִן (שפכה) [שֻׁפְּכ֥וּ] אֲשֻׁרָֽי׃	But as for me, my feet were almost gone; my steps had well nigh slipped.	ἐμοῦ δὲ παραμικρὸν ἐσαλεύθησαν οἱ πόδες, παρ᾿ ὀλίγον ἐξεχύθη τὰ διαβήματά μου.
3	כִּֽי־קִ֭נֵּאתִי בַּהוֹלְלִ֑ים שְׁל֖וֹם רְשָׁעִ֣ים אֶרְאֶֽה׃	For I was envious at the foolish, when I saw the prosperity of the wicked.	ὅτι ἐζήλωσα ἐπὶ τοῖς ἀνόμοις εἰρήνην ἁμαρτωλῶν θεωρῶν,
4	כִּ֤י אֵ֖ין חַרְצֻבּ֥וֹת לְמוֹתָ֗ם וּבָרִ֥יא אוּלָֽם׃	For there are no bands in their death: but their strength is firm.	ὅτι οὐκ ἔστιν ἀνάνευσις ἐν τῷ θανάτῳ αὐτῶν καὶ στερέωμα ἐν τῇ μάστιγι αὐτῶν·
5	בַּעֲמַ֣ל אֱנ֣וֹשׁ אֵינֵ֑מוֹ וְעִם־אָ֝דָ֗ם לֹ֣א יְנֻגָּֽעוּ׃	They are not in trouble as other men; neither are they plagued like other men.	ἐν κόποις ἀνθρώπων οὐκ εἰσὶ καὶ μετὰ ἀνθρώπων οὐ μαστιγωθήσονται.
6	לָ֭כֵן עֲנָקַ֣תְמוֹ גַאֲוָ֑ה יַעֲטָף־שִׁ֝֗ית חָמָ֥ס לָֽמוֹ׃	Therefore pride compasseth them about as a chain; violence covereth them as a garment.	διὰ τοῦτο ἐκράτησεν αὐτοὺς ἡ ὑπερηφανία, περιεβάλοντο ἀδικίαν καὶ ἀσέβειαν ἑαυτῶν.
7	יָ֭צָא מֵחֵ֣לֶב עֵינֵ֑מוֹ עָ֝בְר֗וּ מַשְׂכִּיּ֥וֹת לֵבָֽב׃	Their eyes stand out with fatness: they have more than heart could wish.	ἐξελεύσεται ὡς ἐκ στέατος ἡ ἀδικία αὐτῶν, διῆλθον εἰς διάθεσιν καρδίας·
8	יָמִ֤יקוּ ׀ וִידַבְּר֣וּ בְרָ֣ע עֹ֑שֶׁק מִמָּר֥וֹם יְדַבֵּֽרוּ׃	They are corrupt, and speak wickedly concerning oppression: they speak loftily.	διενοήθησαν καὶ ἐλάλησαν ἐν πονηρίᾳ, ἀδικίαν εἰς τὸ ὕψος ἐλάλησαν·
9	שַׁתּ֣וּ בַשָּׁמַ֣יִם פִּיהֶ֑ם וּ֝לְשׁוֹנָ֗ם תִּהֲלַ֥ךְ בָּאָֽרֶץ׃	They set their mouth against the heavens, and their tongue walketh through the earth.	ἔθεντο εἰς οὐρανὸν τὸ στόμα αὐτῶν, καὶ ἡ γλῶσσα αὐτῶν διῆλθεν ἐπὶ τῆς γῆς.
10	לָכֵ֤ן ׀ (ישיב) [יָשׁ֣וּב] עַמּ֣וֹ הֲלֹ֑ם וּמֵ֥י מָ֝לֵ֗א יִמָּ֥צוּ לָֽמוֹ׃	Therefore his people return hither: and waters of a full cup are wrung out to them.	διὰ τοῦτο ἐπιστρέψει ὁ λαός μου ἐνταῦθα, καὶ ἡμέραι πλήρεις εὑρεθήσονται ἐν αὐτοῖς.
11	וְֽאָמְר֗וּ אֵיכָ֥ה יָדַֽע־אֵ֑ל וְיֵ֖שׁ דֵּעָ֣ה בְעֶלְיֽוֹן׃	And they say, How doth God know? and is there knowledge in the most High?	καὶ εἶπαν· πῶς ἔγνω ὁ Θεός; καὶ εἰ ἔστι γνῶσις ἐν τῷ ῾Υψίστῳ;
12	הִנֵּה־אֵ֥לֶּה רְשָׁעִ֑ים וְשַׁלְוֵ֥י ע֝וֹלָ֗ם הִשְׂגּוּ־חָֽיִל׃	Behold, these are the ungodly, who prosper in the world; they increase in riches.	ἰδοὺ οὗτοι οἱ ἁμαρτωλοὶ καὶ εὐθηνοῦντες· εἰς τὸν αἰῶνα κατέσχον πλούτου.
13	אַךְ־רִ֭יק זִכִּ֣יתִי לְבָבִ֑י וָאֶרְחַ֖ץ בְּנִקָּי֣וֹן כַּפָּֽי׃	Verily I have cleansed my heart in vain, and washed my hands in innocency.	καὶ εἶπα· ἄρα ματαίως ἐδικαίωσα τὴν καρδίαν μου καὶ ἐνιψάμην ἐν ἀθῴοις τὰς χεῖράς μου·
14	וָאֱהִ֣י נָ֭גוּעַ כׇּל־הַיּ֑וֹם וְ֝תוֹכַחְתִּ֗י לַבְּקָרִֽים׃	For all the day long have I been plagued, and chastened every morning.	καὶ ἐγενόμην μεμαστιγωμένος ὅλην τὴν ἡμέραν, καὶ ὁ ἔλεγχός μου εἰς τὰς πρωΐας.
15	אִם־אָ֭מַרְתִּי אֲסַפְּרָ֥ה כְמ֑וֹ הִנֵּ֤ה ד֖וֹר בָּנֶ֣יךָ בָגָֽדְתִּי׃	If I say, I will speak thus; behold, I should offend against the generation of thy children.	εἰ ἔλεγον· διηγήσομαι οὕτως, ἰδοὺ τῇ γενεᾷ τῶν υἱῶν σου ἠσυνθέτηκα.
16	וָ֭אֲחַשְּׁבָה לָדַ֣עַת זֹ֑את עָמָ֖ל (היא) [ה֣וּא] בְעֵינָֽי׃	When I thought to know this, it was too painful for me;	καὶ ὑπέλαβον τοῦ γνῶναι τοῦτο· κόπος ἐστὶν ἐνώπιόν μου,
17	עַד־אָ֭בוֹא אֶל־מִקְדְּשֵׁי־אֵ֑ל אָ֝בִ֗ינָה לְאַחֲרִיתָֽם׃	Until I went into the sanctuary of God; then understood I their end.	ἕως εἰσέλθω εἰς τὸ ἁγιαστήριον τοῦ Θεοῦ καὶ συνῶ εἰς τὰ ἔσχατα αὐτῶν.
18	אַ֣ךְ בַּ֭חֲלָקוֹת תָּשִׁ֣ית לָ֑מוֹ הִ֝פַּלְתָּ֗ם לְמַשּׁוּאֽוֹת׃	Surely thou didst set them in slippery places: thou castedst them down into destruction.	πλὴν διὰ τὰς δολιότητας αὐτῶν ἔθου αὐτοῖς κακά, κατέβαλες αὐτοὺς ἐν τῷ ἐπαρθῆναι.
19	אֵ֤יךְ הָי֣וּ לְשַׁמָּ֣ה כְרָ֑גַע סָ֥פוּ תַ֝֗מּוּ מִן־בַּלָּהֽוֹת׃	How are they brought into desolation, as in a moment! they are utterly consumed with terrors.	πῶς ἐγένοντο εἰς ἐρήμωσιν ἐξάπινα· ἐξέλιπον, ἀπώλοντο διὰ τὴν ἀνομίαν αὐτῶν.
20	כַּחֲל֥וֹם מֵהָקִ֑יץ אֲ֝דֹנָ֗י בָּעִ֤יר ׀ צַלְמָ֬ם תִּבְזֶֽה׃	As a dream when one awaketh; so, O Lord, when thou awakest, thou shalt despise their image.	ὡσεὶ ἐνύπνιον ἐξεγειρομένου, Κύριε, ἐν τῇ πόλει σου τὴν εἰκόνα αὐτῶν ἐξουδενώσεις.
21	כִּ֭י יִתְחַמֵּ֣ץ לְבָבִ֑י וְ֝כִלְיוֹתַ֗י אֶשְׁתּוֹנָֽן׃	Thus my heart was grieved, and I was pricked in my reins.	ὅτι ἐξεκαύθη ἡ καρδία μου, καὶ οἱ νεφροί μου ἠλλοιώθησαν,
22	וַאֲנִי־בַ֭עַר וְלֹ֣א אֵדָ֑ע בְּ֝הֵמ֗וֹת הָיִ֥יתִי עִמָּֽךְ׃	So foolish was I, and ignorant: I was as a beast before thee.	κἀγὼ ἐξουδενωμένος καὶ οὐκ ἔγνων, κτηνώδης ἐγενόμην παρά σοι.
23	וַאֲנִ֣י תָמִ֣יד עִמָּ֑ךְ אָ֝חַ֗זְתָּ בְּיַד־יְמִינִֽי׃	Nevertheless I am continually with thee: thou hast holden me by my right hand.	κἀγὼ διαπαντὸς μετὰ σοῦ, ἐκράτησας τῆς χειρὸς τῆς δεξιᾶς μου
24	בַּעֲצָתְךָ֥ תַנְחֵ֑נִי וְ֝אַחַ֗ר כָּב֥וֹד תִּקָּחֵֽנִי׃	Thou shalt guide me with thy counsel, and afterward receive me to glory.	καὶ ἐν τῇ βουλῇ σου ὡδήγησάς με καὶ μετὰ δόξης προσελάβου με.
25	מִי־לִ֥י בַשָּׁמָ֑יִם וְ֝עִמְּךָ֗ לֹֽא־חָפַ֥צְתִּי בָאָֽרֶץ׃	Whom have I in heaven but thee? and there is none upon earth that I desire beside thee.	τί γάρ μοι ὑπάρχει ἐν τῷ οὐρανῷ, καὶ παρὰ σοῦ τί ἠθέλησα ἐπὶ τῆς γῆς;
26	כָּלָ֥ה שְׁאֵרִ֗י וּלְבָ֫בִ֥י צוּר־לְבָבִ֥י וְחֶלְקִ֗י אֱלֹהִ֥ים לְעוֹלָֽם׃	My flesh and my heart faileth: but God is the strength of my heart, and my portion for ever.	ἐξέλιπεν ἡ καρδία μου καὶ ἡ σάρξ μου, ὁ Θεὸς τῆς καρδίας μου καὶ ἡ μερίς μου ὁ Θεὸς εἰς τὸν αἰῶνα.
27	כִּֽי־הִנֵּ֣ה רְחֵקֶ֣יךָ יֹאבֵ֑דוּ הִ֝צְמַ֗תָּה כׇּל־זוֹנֶ֥ה מִמֶּֽךָּ׃	For, lo, they that are far from thee shall perish: thou hast destroyed all them that go a whoring from thee.	ὅτι ἰδοὺ οἱ μακρύνοντες ἑαυτοὺς ἀπὸ σοῦ ἀπολοῦνται, ἐξωλόθρευσας πάντα τὸν πορνεύοντα ἀπὸ σοῦ.
28	וַאֲנִ֤י ׀ קִ֥רְבַ֥ת אֱלֹהִ֗ים לִ֫י־ט֥וֹב שַׁתִּ֤י ׀ בַּאדֹנָ֣י יֱהֹוִ֣ה מַחְסִ֑י לְ֝סַפֵּ֗ר כׇּל־מַלְאֲכוֹתֶֽיךָ׃	But it is good for me to draw near to God: I have put my trust in the Lord GOD, that I may declare all thy works.	ἐμοὶ δὲ τὸ προσκολλᾶσθαι τῷ Θεῷ ἀγαθόν ἐστι, τίθεσθαι ἐν τῷ Κυρίῳ τὴν ἐλπίδα μου τοῦ ἐξαγγεῖλαί με πάσας τὰς αἰνέσεις σου ἐν ταῖς πύλαις τῆς θυγατρὸς Σιών.

=== Verse 1 ===
Truly God is good to Israel, To such as are pure in heart.

It is also possible to render the opening words, with a marginal note in the Revised Version, as "Only good is God". However, Alexander Kirkpatrick, who makes this observation, argues that "Surely God is good ..." is the preferred form of words. He suggests that these words represent "the conclusion to which [the Psalmist] had been led through the trial of his faith".
