= Salvation is Created =

1912 choral work by Pavel Chesnokov

"Thou Hast Wrought Salvation" is a choral work composed by Pavel Chesnokov in 1912 as the fifth in his Ten Communion Hymns (Op. 25). It was one of the last sacred works he composed before he turned to secular arts when the Soviet government began to suppress Christianity. Although he never heard his own composition performed, his children had the opportunity following his death. "Thou Hast Wrought Salvation'" was originally published in 1913 by J. Fischer and Bro. and its popularity drove editors to produce many different versions in both Russian and English. Scored for six voices (SATTBB), the work is a communion hymn based on a synodal Kievan chant melody and Psalm 74 (73 in the Greek version). The original Church Slavonic text is as follows:

- Cyrillic script: Cпасение coдeлaл еси посреде земли, Боже. Аллилуия.
- Latin alphabet: Spaséniye sodélal yesí posredé ziemlí, Bózhe. Allilúiya.
- English translation: Thou hast wrought salvation in the midst of the earth, O God. Alleluia.

Note: The source of the common mistranslation "Salvation is Created" appears to be the 1913 edition by J. Fischer & Bro.

The keys of B minor and D major are the work's primary key centers, and it is cast in AA’ or two part strophic form.

== Band setting ==
Arranged in 1957 by Bruce Houseknecht, a wind band arrangement is considered a standard in the literature. Form, phrasing, and meter are all unaltered in the arrangement, but the key was changed to C minor and E-flat major for playability and intonation purposes.
