= Psalm 150 (Franck) =

1883 psalm setting by César Franck

Psaume 150
- by César Franck
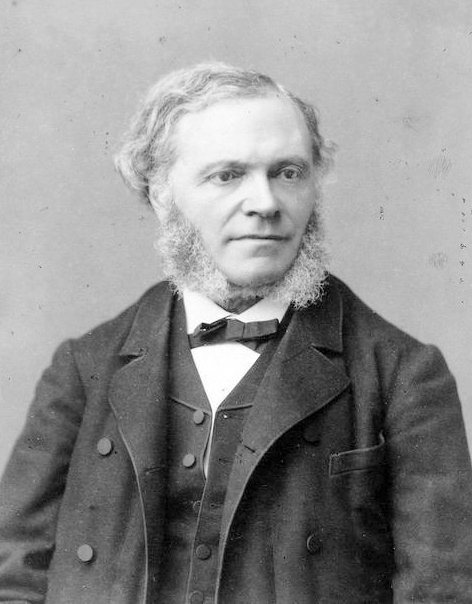
- The composer
- English: Psalm 150
- Key: D major
- Text: Psalm 150
- Language: Latin; French
- Composed: 1883
- Published: 1896
- Scoring: SATB choir; orchestra; organ

Psalm 150 (French: Psaume 150) is a psalm setting by César Franck. He wrote the composition, setting Psalm 150 for four-part choir, orchestra and organ, in 1883. It was published in 1896 by Breitkopf & Härtel. Carus-Verlag published an arrangement for choir, strings and organ. The incipit in French is Halleluiah! Louez le Dieu, caché dans ses saints tabernacles.

== History ==
Psalm 150, the final psalm of the Book of Psalms, calls to praise God in music, listing nine types of instruments. It is also called "the musicians' psalm". It has inspired composers such as Anton Bruckner, Igor Stravinsky, and Benjamin Britten.

Franck was born in Liège but worked in Paris as an organist of various churches, in the end at the Cavaillé-Coll organ of Sainte-Clotilde, where he served from 1858 until his death. He was a professor of organ at the Conservatoire de Paris from 1872. He composed church music from motets to oratorios. His most popular work was a setting of the hymn Panis angelicus from 1872.

In 1883, he set Psalm 150 in French, Halleluiah! Louez le Dieu, caché dans ses saints tabernacles, for choir, orchestra and organ, on a commission by the National Institute for Blind Youth, for the inauguration of its organ. The composition was published in 1896 by Breitkopf & Härtel, after the composer's death. Carus-Verlag published a version for choir, strings and organ, with optional harp and percussion, in 1976 in order to retain the work's sonority but make it accessible for smaller groups, especially church choirs in the liturgy. Carus also published an organ version, with text in French, German and Latin.

== Music ==
Franck's psalm setting is one of his late works, in symphonic writing, with bold harmonies and chromatism, and an unusual form. The composition in one movement is set in D major in common time and marked Poco allegretto ma maestoso. Franck used the orchestra like extended organ stops. The tonality often shifts between major and minor. The choral writing is simple compared to the instrumental lines. The duration is given as five minutes.

The composition begins with a long instrumental introduction, very soft and in long notes, with D sounding throughout. The bass voices enter softly in measure 26, with the word "Halleluiah", also on D, imitated by the altos a measure later, while the accompaniment turns to steady quarter notes. After four measures of more melodious instrumental lines in dotted rhythm, tenors and sopranos imitate the sequence, now on A and stronger. In a third imitation, all voices sing "Halleluiah" several times on D, again stronger. After the long building, the basses alone begin in measure 45 to sing the first two verses of the psalm with a chorale-like melody. The text of the following two verses, mentioning the instruments, is rendered from measure 61 by all voices in imitation, and more lively in both voices and accompaniment, ending in homophony in measure 75. The motifs of the melodious interlude are picked up by the voices, beginning with the tenors, then with added sopranos, finally all four, to express the fifth and sixth psalm verses, about everything breathing praise the Lord. A very loud climax is reached in measure 96. A measure later, the text of verses 1 and 2 returns with the melody, now sung by all in unison. The text and music of verses 3 and 4 are also repeated and lead to several forceful repetitions of "Halleluiah".

== Recordings ==
In 1996, an organ version of Franck's Psalm 150 was included in a recording Most Sacred Banquet by the St. Thomas Choir of Men and Boys at Saint Thomas Church in Manhattan, conducted by Gerre Hancock, who also performed sacred music such as Duruflé's Quatre Motets sur des thèmes grégoriens. It was part of a 1998 album of Festive Christmas Music, performed by the Knabenkantorei Basel conducted by Beat Raaflaub, which also contains carols and other psalm settings.
