= Pavel Chesnokov =

Russian composer (1877–1944)

Pavel Grigorievich Chesnokov (Russian: Пáвел Григóрьевич Чеснокóв) (24 October 1877, Voskresensk, Zvenigorodsky Uyezd, Moscow Governorate – 14 March 1944, Moscow, also transliterated Tschesnokoff, Tchesnokov, Tchesnokoff, and Chesnokoff) was an Imperial Russian and Soviet composer, choral conductor and teacher. He composed over five hundred choral works, over four hundred of which are sacred. Today, he is most known for his piece Salvation is Created as well as works such as Do Not Reject Me in Old Age (solo for basso profondo) and movements from various settings of the Divine Liturgy of St John Chrysostom.

== Life ==
Chesnokov was born in Vladimir, near Moscow, on 24 October 1877. While attending the Moscow Conservatory, he received extensive training in both instrumental and vocal music including nine years of solfège, and seven years training for both the piano and violin. His studies in composition included four years of harmony, counterpoint, and form. During his years at the school, he had the opportunity to study with prominent Russian composers like Sergei Taneyev and Mikhail Ippolitov-Ivanov, who greatly influenced his style of liturgy-driven choral composition.

At an early age, Chesnokov gained recognition as a great conductor and choirmaster while leading many groups including the Russian Choral Society Choir. This reputation earned him a position on staff at the Moscow Conservatory where great composers and music scholars like Tchaikovsky had shared their skills and musical insight. There he founded a choral conducting program, which he taught from 1920 until his death.

By the age of 30, Chesnokov had completed nearly four hundred sacred choral works, but his proliferation of church music came to a standstill at the time of the Russian revolution. Under communist rule, no one was permitted to produce any form of sacred art. So in response, he composed an additional hundred secular works, and conducted secular choirs like the Moscow Academy Choir and the Bolshoi Theatre Choir. In the Soviet era, religion was often under oppression. Thus, the Cathedral of Christ the Saviour, whose last choirmaster had been Chesnokov, was destroyed, which disturbed him so deeply that he stopped writing music altogether.

Chesnokov died on 14 March 1944 of a heart attack caused by malnutrition while he was waiting in a Moscow bread line.

== Some notable works ==
- Corpus
- Salvation is Created (1912)
- O Lord God
- Duh Tvoy Blagiy ("Let Thy Good Spirit")
- Liturgy of the Presanctified Gifts, Op.24
- "Da Ispravitsya Molitva Moya" ("Let My Prayer Arise"), Op.24 No.6
- To Thee We Sing (We Praise Thee), Op.27
- Panikhída, Op.39
- Divine Liturgy of St. John Chrysostom, Op.42
- All-night vigil, Op.44
