= Ernani Aguiar =

Brazilian musician

- Born: 30 August 1950 (age 76)
- Occupations: composer and conductor

Academic work
- Discipline: musicology
- Institutions: Federal University of Rio de Janeiro
- Notable works: Salmo 150

Ernani Henrique Chaves Aguiar (born 30 August 1950) is a Brazilian composer, conductor, and musicologist.

== Life and career ==
A scholarship winner to the Argentine Mozarteum, Aguiar studied under various composers and conductors in South America and later in Europe, including Sergiu Celibidache. As a musicologist, he has specialized in the revising, editing, and revival of works by composers of the 18th century Minas Gerais School. He has written a number of instrumental pieces, but his most famous works are his choral pieces, such as the fiery Salmo 150, composed in 1975 and published in 1993, which features rhythmic backgrounds with very rapid articulations. Salmo 150 has proved a very popular piece among choral conductors worldwide, particularly within the American Choral Directors Association.

He is currently a professor of music at the Federal University of Rio de Janeiro, a fellow of the Villa-Lobos Institute, and a member of the Academia Brasileira de Música.

== Choral works ==
- Cantilena, para coro "a capella"
- Danças, para barítono e cordas, 1993
- Falai de Deus, para coro "a capella"
- Missa Brevis
- Missa Brevis II in honorem S. Francisci Assisiensis, para coro "a capella"
- Missa Brevis III
- O sacrum convivium, para coro misto "a capella"
- Oração de São Francisco, para coro misto "a capella"
- Psalm 74
- Psalmus CL, para coro "a capella"
- Refrão, para coro misto "a capella"
- Sacipererê, para coro infantil "a capella"
- Salmo 150 (Psalm 150), 1993
- Venid, para coro "a capella"
- Ave Maria SSATB "a capella"

== Instrumental works ==
- Bifonia nº 1 e nº 2, para flauta e fagote
- Duo, para violino e cello, 1986
- Melorritmias, para flauta
- Miniaturas, para clarineta e piano
- Sonatina, para piano
- Toques de cabocolinhos, para piano
- Três peças, para trompete e piano, 1971
- Violoncelada, para oito violoncelos, 1993

== Operatic works ==
- O menino Maluquinho, 1993

== Orchestral works ==
- Cantata de Natal, para coro e orquestra
- Cantata O menino maluquinho, para coro e orquestra, 1989
- Cantos sacros para orixás, para coro e orquestra, 1994
- Sinfonietta prima, para orquestra sinfônica, 1990
- "Quatro mementos No 3"
