= Erik Kase Romero =

American record producer

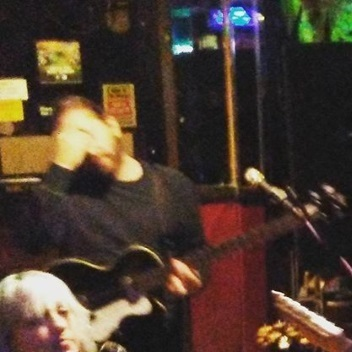
- Romero in 2017

Background information
- Origin: New Jersey, U.S.
- Genres: Indie rock, alternative rock
- Occupation: Record producer
- Years active: 2010s–present
- Labels: Sniffling Indie Kids, Fueled by Ramen
- Website: erikkaseromero.com

Erik Kase Romero is an American record producer, recording engineer and session instrumentalist.

== Work ==
As a producer and engineer, Kase Romero began working primarily at the Lake House Recording in Asbury Park, New Jersey, in the early 2010s, and is noted for his work with Lorde and the Bouncing Souls. He has also produced every album by Deal Casino, since their EP Heck. In addition to studio production, Kase Romero does arrangements, such as playing a Hammond B3 for the Jackson Pines' album Gas Station Blues & Diamond Rings. Music journalist Bob Makin describes some of Kase Romero's signature production nuances as "bouncy bass lines and sweet gang vocals."

Kase Romero played with Jeff Lane and Natalie Newbold in the groups Green Paper and the Humboldts, before forming dollys in 2013. They describe their music as "poppy, harmony filled music that's fun to listen to," and they released three albums, and one EP. He also played in Allison Strong's studio band, who released the studio album March Towards the Sun, in 2014. After dolly's disbanded in 2017, Kase Romero joined as bassist for the band the Front Bottoms.

== Producer ==
Year	Album	Band	Notes
2011	Skip to the Good Part	He is We	Mixing and musician
2011	Alice & the RV	Alice & the RV	Engineering, mixing and musician
2012	Kate	Alex & Janel	Engineering, mixing and musician
2012	Let is Sail	Lost In Society	Engineering and mixing
2012	Pistol Charmer	Pistol Charmer	Production, engineering, mixing, mastering and musician
2013	Way to Fight	Seasons	Production, engineering, mixing and musician
2013	Cocaine Love	Deal Casino	Engineering and mixing
2013	EP1	dollys	Production, engineering, mixing and musician
2013	The Runaways	Deal Casino	Engineering and mixing
2014	Anywhere I Lay My Head	The Gaslight Anthem	Engineering and mixing
2014	Blah Blah	Lightning Jar	Production, engineering and mixing
2014	Rose	The Front Bottoms	Engineering
2014	March Towards the Sun	Allison Strong	Engineering, mixing and musician
2014	Dancing in the Dark	Nicole Atkins	Engineering
2014	Whiskey and the Mourning After	Francis Lombardi	Engineering, mixing and mastering
2014	From Wires	Two Point Eight	Engineering, mixing and musician
2014	Yellow Flicker Beat	Lorde	Engineering
2014	Heck	Deal Casino	Engineering and mastering
2015	The Post Human Condition	No More Pain	Engineering
2015	Shuffle Your Zeros	The Hopscotch Rebellion	Production, engineering, mixing and mastering
2015	Never Leaving	Thomas Wesley Stern	Production, engineering, and mixing
2015	The Pixelated Soul	Goodbye Tiger	Production, engineering, mixing, mastering and musician
2015	Lights	Pistol Charmer	Production, engineering, mixing, mastering and musician
2017	Volume 1	Haunt Club	Production, engineering, musician and songwriting
2021	We're Drifting Further Aparter, Aren't We?	Sonic Blume	Production, engineering, musician and songwriting
2022	Generation of Me	Tor Miller	Engineering and musician
2022	That Weight	Wellwisher	Production, engineering, and musician

- Letters (2015) by Toy Cars – production, engineering, mixing and musician
- Oh, Please (2015) by dollys – production, engineering and musician
- Atlantic (2015) by Jamie Coppa – production, engineering, mixing and musician
- Nika (2015) by Deal Casino – engineering and mixing
- Take the Red Pill (2015) by the Humboldts – production, engineering, mixing, mastering and musician
- Patterns (2015) by the Company Kept – production, engineering, mixing and mastering
- Swindled (2016) by Up for Nothing – engineering
- Modern Illusions (2016) by Lost In Society – engineering and mixing
- low year (2016) by dollys – production, engineering and musician
- So on and so Forth (2016) by Griffin House – mastering
- Good Hangs (2016) by Lauren Patti – production, engineering, mixing, mastering and musician
- Santayana (2016) by Goodbye Tiger – production, engineering, mixing and musician
- Three (2016) by Plow United – engineering
- Mackenzie (2016) by The Box Tiger – production, engineering, mixing and mastering
- The Weeklings (2016) by The Weeklings – engineering and mixing
- Simplicity (2016) by the Bouncing Souls – engineering
- Place to Settle (2016) by Colton Kayser – engineering and musician
- Balance (2016) by MACK – production, engineering and mastering
- The Same Noise (2016) by YJY – mixing and mastering
- Sleeping Patterns (2016) by Toy Cars – production, engineering and musician
- Songs for Best Friends (2016) by Almost People – engineering and musician
- On Condition (2016) by the Attack – engineering and mixing
- Indie Rock is Dying (2016) by the Pomps – engineering, mixing and mastering
- "i'll go" (2016) by Well Wisher – production, engineering, mixing, mastering and musician
- Ragged Lines (2016) by Ragged Lines – production, engineering, mixing, mastering and musician
- Human Cannonball (2016) by Deal Casino – engineering
- Curses, Maledictions, & Harsh Reiterations (2017) by Rick Barry – engineering, mixing and musician
- The Shock that made you Come Alive (2017) by Jerzy Jung – production, engineering and musician
- Here I Made This for You (Mixtape Vol. 2) (2017) by Beach Slang – engineering, mixing and musician
- From the Sea to the Sky (2017) by Camille Peruto – production, engineering and musician
- The Goblin Bee (2017) by Matthew Pulomena – production, engineering, mixing and musician
- The Gleaner (2017) by Tara Dente – engineering and musician
- Circles (2017) by MACK – production, engineering and mixing
- Stars Above & Depths Below (2017) by Dark City Strings – production, engineering, mixing and mastering
- Take a Second (2017) by Modern Chemistry – production and engineering
- The Enduring YJY (2017) by YJY – mixing and mastering
- tense (2017) by dollys – production, engineering and musician
- Lost & Found (2017) by Jackson Pines – production, engineering, mixing, mastering and musician
- Gas Station Blues & Diamond Rings (2017) by Jackson Pines – production, engineering, mixing and musician
- Uncharted Waters (2017) by Ella Ross – engineering and musician
- Red Lights, Your Ghost (2017) by Ragged Lines – production, engineering, mixing, mastering and musician
- Going Grey (2017) by the Front Bottoms – engineering
- The North American (2017) by Dogfish – production, engineering, mixing, mastering and musician
- Awake Again (2017) by Prim – production, engineering and musician
- Volume One (2017) by Haunt Club – production, engineering and musician
- Calidus (2017) by Deal Casino – production, engineering and mixing
- French Toast (2018) by Bottled Blonde – production, engineering and musician
- Paint Brain (2018) by Toy Cars – production, engineering and musician
- Too Hard to Tell (2018) by Dogwood Tales – production, engineering and mixing
- Runaway (2018) by Jamie Coppa – production, engineering, mixing, mastering and musician
- Everyone In This Band is Fat (2018) by Secret Mountain – production, engineering and mixing
- Home of the Hits (2018) by Handsome Crü – production, engineering and mixing
- Sweet Baby (2018) by Lauren Patti – production, engineering and musician
- Ann (2018) by the Front Bottoms – production, engineering and musician
- Isadora Duncan (2018) by Deal Casino – production, engineering and musician
- Beach Karma (2018) by Sonic Blume – production, engineering and mixing
- Surviving the Suburbs (2018) by Tor Miller – musician
- Sonic Blume (2017) by Sonic Blume – production, engineering and mixing
- Preface | Velvet Noir (2018) by Blaise – production, engineering, mixing musician
- Velvet Noir (2018) by Blaise – production, engineering, mixing musician
- Deal Casino (2018) by Deal Casino – engineering
- LLC (2018) by Deal Casino – production, engineering and musician
- End of Summer (now I know) (2018) (November 16, 2014) by The Front Bottoms – production, engineering and musician
- This is Fine (2018) by Well Wisher – production and engineering
- "Swimmers" (2018) by Modern Chemistry – production, engineering and musician
- Die Progress Unit I (2018) by Delicate Flowers – percussion production
- Fruit (2019) by Bottled Blonde – production, engineering and musician
- "Bizarre Love Triangle" (2019) by Sonic Blume – production, engineering and mixing
