= Back on Top (The Front Bottoms album) =

Studio album by The Front Bottoms
- Released: September 18, 2015
- Genre: Indie rock, folk punk
- Length: 42:36
- Label: Fueled by Ramen

The Front Bottoms chronology
Talon of the Hawk (2013)	Back on Top (2015)	Going Grey (2017)

Singles from Back on Top
- 1. "West Virginia" Released: June 10, 2015; 2. "Cough It Out" Released: June 22, 2015; 3. "HELP" Released: July 30, 2015; 4. "Laugh Till I Cry" Released: August 14, 2015; 5. "Summer Shandy" Released: September 11, 2015

Professional ratings
Aggregate scores
Source	Rating
Metacritic	82/100
Review scores
Source	Rating

Back on Top is the third studio album by American rock band The Front Bottoms. It was released on September 18, 2015, on Fueled by Ramen, their first for the label.

== Composition ==
In an interview, frontman Brian Sella talked about the idea for the album title. He stated that "The inspiration for the name Back On Top sort of just came from… it was an idea that we had like, a while ago, when we all kind of got a kick out it. We thought it was pretty funny, it was a little bit cocky, but also kind of confusing because it didn’t make any sense, which we thought was kind of our style. You can kind of grasp on different parts of it."

He then went on to talk about the writing and recording process, stating "the writing and recording process sort of… we wrote the album, and then we went out to record it in California. The recording process was intense, and it was the most "professional," I guess you could say, style of recording that we’ve ever done. We got to work with an awesome producer and we got to throw our ideas at him, and I think we got to kind of learn how to make an album professionally, you know? We were like, “All right, we’re making an album, we got a job, we’re here to do it,” and we were very proud of how it came out, for sure."

== Release ==
The band announced they were releasing their first album under Fueled By Ramen on July 30, 2015. They released the lead single, Help, off the album the same day.

== Reception ==
In an AllMusic review by James Christopher Monger, the Front Bottoms are recognized for "making the jump to a major label without losing any authenticity in process", with Monger calling the album a "spirited set of good time folk-punk that's as hook-filled and hilarious as it is filthy."

== Track listing ==
=== Original release ===
No.	Title	Length
1.	"Motorcycle"	3:26
2.	"Summer Shandy"	3:35
3.	"Cough It Out"	4:20
4.	"HELP"	3:45
5.	"Laugh Till I Cry"	3:47
6.	"Historic Cemetery" (featuring GDP)	4:19
7.	"The Plan (Fuck Jobs)"	3:38
8.	"Ginger"	3:14
9.	"2YL"	4:11
10.	"West Virginia"	4:13
11.	"Plastic Flowers"	4:08
Total length:		42:36

=== Outtakes ===
No.	Title	Length
1.	"Tighten Up"	3:30
2.	"Joanie"	3:07
Total length:		6:37

== Charts ==
Chart (2015)	Peak position
US Billboard 200	32
US Top Alternative Albums (Billboard)	6
US Top Rock Albums (Billboard)	10
