= Couch Surfin USA =

EP by YJY
- Released: 7 July 2015
- Studio: 1989 Recordings
- Genre: Indie rock, surf rock
- Length: 14:48
- Label: Sniffling Indie Kids
- Producer: YJY

YJY chronology
Couch Surfin USA (2015)	The Same Noise (2016)

Couch Surfin USA is the debut studio EP from the American rock band YJY.

== Content ==
The five-track EP was released with Sniffling Indie Kids as digital download, on 7 July 2015. It also had a limited release on clear vinyl, with one copy available for a fan, which was auctioned for City of Angels. Couch Surfin USA was recorded at 1989 Recordings and TFMH, mixed by Tim Fitzpatrick and Steve Sachs, produced by YJY, and mastered by Carl Saff. The cover art is by Morgan Turcus. The album draws comparison to the music of the Beach Boys, My Bloody Valentine, and Real Estate. In an interview with Impose, Dave Sachs recalls "we knew heading into our session at 1989 that we were going to have to work fast, so we came prepared. Kegan and Dara were more than ready for us and we managed to record the entire EP over the span of two days."

The music video for "Couch Surfin USA" released on 26 May 2015, was edited by Lorenzo, and features footage of the band performing live and hanging around New Jersey. The music video for "Amelie" was released on 20 January 2016, directed by Dean Luis Chuqui, edited by Lorenzo, and was inspired by the works of underground filmmaker Kenneth Anger. A review of the song and video, as described by Speak Into My Good Eye editor Mike Mehalick, says "the driving, hazy, wonderfully nostalgic song is appropriately matched with VHS visions of a cloud filled sky and colorful exposures of Steve Sachs waxing and having a moment of sorts with a 1974 Volkswagen Beetle."

== Reception ==
Couch Surfin USA won The Deli's Best of 2015 Open Submission Poll. A review by Sjimon Gompers in Impose says that "the EP Couch Surfin USA hits the waves with plush throw cushions on the title track that takes you on that futon crashing tour of the 50 Northern States of DIY." The review closes with "hearts beat on in a blur of treated guitars that roll with the sensibility of the record shop school of rock that wraps together the modernist medium with the passion of the current common era." You Don't Know Jersey calls the album "fuzz-indie pop laced with humor and emotion."

== Track listing ==
No.	Title	Length
1.	"Couch Surfin USA"	3:22
2.	"Do You Love Me"	2:39
3.	"Surreal"	3:00
4.	"Missed Connections"	3:14
5.	"Amelia"	2:33
Total length:		14:48

== Personnel ==
- Tim Fitzpatrick – bass
- Ricky Lorenzo – vocals and guitar
- Dave Sachs – drums
- Steve Sachs – vocals and guitar

=== Additional musicians ===
- Dara Hirsch – additional vocals on "Amelia"
- Morgan Turcus – additional vocals "Couch Surfin USA"
