= Monogold =

- Origin: Brooklyn, NY
- Genres: Psychedelic, Indie-Pop
- Years active: 2005-present
- Members: Jared Apuzzo; Michael Andrew "Mike" Falotico; Keith Thomas Kelly
- Website: https://monogold.bandcamp.com/

Monogold is a three piece psychedelic indie pop band from Brooklyn, New York formed in 2005. Members are guitarist-vocalist Keith Kelly, bassist Mike Falotico and drummer Jared Apuzzo. Their recordings are generally DIY recorded and produced by the band. They have been cited by The Wall Street Journal and Deli Magazine as a band to watch.

== Discography ==
- Records are Waves (EP) - 2006
- This Bloom (EP) - 2007
- We Animals (EP) - 2009
- The Softest Glow - 2011
- Good Heavens - 2015
- Babyfood - 2017
