= The Same Noise =

EP by YJY
- Released: August 19, 2016
- Studio: Converse Rubber Tracks Studio
- Genres: Indie rock, surf rock
- Length: 13:10
- Label: Sniffling Indie Kids
- Producer: Jason Finkel

YJY chronology
Couch Surfin USA (2015)	The Same Noise (2016)	The Enduring YJY (2017)

The Same Noise is the second studio EP from the American rock band YJY.

== Content ==
The four-track EP was released with Sniffling Indie Kids digitally and on compact disc, cassette and vinyl, on August 19, 2016. It was recorded at Converse Rubber Tracks Studio in Brooklyn, New York, by Jason Finkel, and mixed and mastered at Lakehouse Recording Studios, by Erik Kase Romero. The album photograph is by Jacob Mooty, with design layout by Steve Sachs. The EP is described as surf-punk indie rock, and it draws comparison to the music of Mac DeMarco, Real Estate, Wavves, and Car Seat Headrest. The song "Through Being Hip" is described as exploring the "murky territory of navigating trends while still trying to figure out a person's own individuality." Sachs explains in an interview with Elmore that the song is "about a person who is confronting the fact that they've continually allowed different subcultures to define them rather than finding a way to define themselves." YJY recorded a live version of "Through Being Hip" for NPR Music's Tiny Desk Concerts.

== Reception ==
Atwood columnist Russ Finney notes The Same Noise represents "a refinement of what the band did well on its previous extended play," adding "what sticks out about the latest EP is the way in which the humor and distinct personality conveyed lyrically not only anchor, but also manage to reinvigorate, the tropes of surf-punkish music." Jim Testa of Jersey Beat compares the EP to the music of Saves the Day and the Cure, describing it as "chimey indie pop that combines cocky, youthful vocals with reverb-y guitars and infectious melodies." He calls "Summer Lifeguard" a "perfect summer crush song with its surfy guitars and breezy rhythm."

The Deli editor Olivia Sisinni describes the song "Through Being Hip" as an "upbeat anthem set against the millenial malaise[;] the ironic lyrics are supported by catchy instrumentals with surf rock drumbeats, that have the potential to become our next earworm." The song is also called a "quirky, catchy jam that clocks in at barely over two minutes but packs major attitude, the breezy, power-pop combo of guitar and drums mixing with the slightly snarky punch of lead vocals" by Elmore.

== Track listing ==
No.	Title	Length
1.	"Summer Lifeguard"	3:09
2.	"Past My Prime"	1:56
3.	"Through Being Hip"	2:05
4.	"Evergreens"	3:00
Total length:		13:10

== Personnel ==
- Tim Fitzpatrick – bass
- Ricky Lorenzo – vocals and guitar
- Dave Sachs – drums
- Steve Sachs – vocals and guitar
