= Interstellar Love =

"Interstellar Love" may refer to:

- "Interstellar Love", song by Paola Bruna from Stockcity Girl
- "Interstellar Love", song by Thundercat from It Is What It Is (Thundercat album) 2020
- "Interstellar Love", song by The Avalanches from We Will Always Love You
- "Interstellar Love Song" song by Delicate Flowers from Die Progress Unit I
