= Delicate Flowers =

American indie rock band

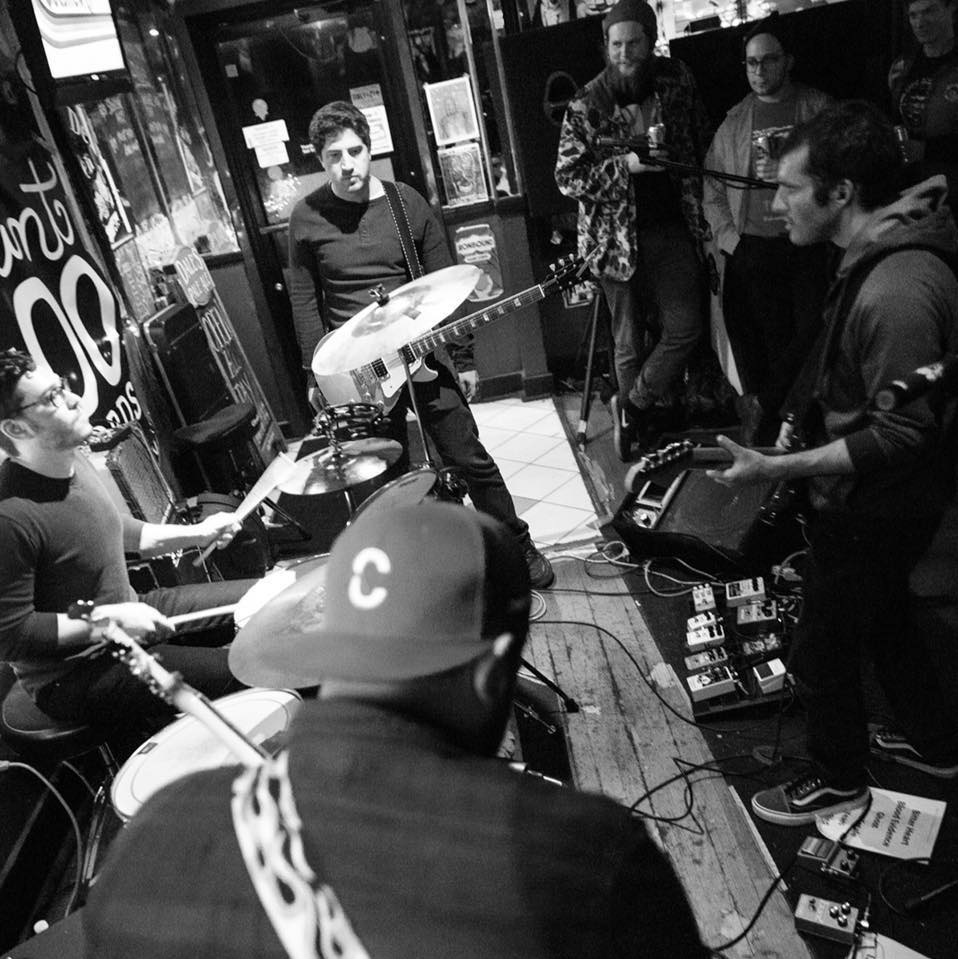
- Delicate Flowers at Stoshs, in 2018.

Background information
- Origin: New Jersey, U.S.
- Genre: Indie rock
- Years active: 2017–current
- Label: Sniffling Indie Kids
- Members: Skylar Adler; Frank DeFranco; Eric Goldberg; Donnie Law

Delicate Flowers is an American indie rock band from New Jersey.

== History ==
Delicate Flowers is a four-piece indie rock and folk band from New Jersey, that formed in 2017. It consists of drummer Skylar Adler, bassist Frank DeFranco, guitarist and vocalist Eric Goldberg, and guitarist Donnie Law. Delicate Flowers began as a solo project by Goldberg, writing "songs that were almost more poems than songs." They draw comparison to the music of Conor Oberst, Sufjan Stevens, My Bloody Valentine and Silversun Pickups. Their first EP, the four-track Delicate Flowers, was released with Sniffling Indie Kids on 6 October 2015, and it contains a cover of "Jesus Doesn't Want Me for a Sunbeam." The lead single "Inherently a Drag" is about "not believing in anything and how that's a bummer but that at the same time, you can't really fool yourself." Speak Into My Good Eye describes the song as a "mature, world-weariness backed by atmospheric, jangly acoustic strums, echoed harmonies and a sense of hope springing up out of the uncertainty." The eight-track album, entitled Happy Accidents, was released on 15 April 2016. Goldberg plays every instrument on the album. Bob Makin in Courier News calls it "strip[ped] down to an indie folk root," adding that the song "Happy Accidents" "mines the kind of intelligent, witty, emotionally raw songwriting that has made Sufjan Stevens and the late Elliott Smith influences on many young artists."

Delicate Flowers performed at the North Jersey Indie Rock Festival on 23 September 2017. They also performed at the Secret Loft's Broken Records: Year One Anniversary! show, with LKFFCT, Shred Flintstone and Bueno, on 17 August 2018. The album Die Progress Unit I was released with Sniffling Indie Kids, on 2 November 2018, and the record release show was held that night at Stosh's in Fair Lawn, New Jersey, with LKFFCT, John Cozz and Toy Cars. The album is the first half of a two-part project that will culminate in the Spring of 2019. The opening track "Vessel" is described as "the finest moments of post-shoegaze and 90s grunge-pop[;] the song is simply impossible to ignore" by Jersey Beat.

== Discography ==
Albums

- Happy Accidents (2016)
- Die Progress Unit I (2018)
- Die Progress Unit II (2020)

EPs

- Delicate Flowers (2015)

== Members ==
- Skylar Adler – drums
- Frank DeFranco – bass
- Eric Goldberg – guitar and vocals
- Donnie Law – guitar
