= Funny You Should Ask =

Funny You Should Ask may refer to one of the following:

- Funny You Should Ask (1968 game show)
- Funny You Should Ask (2017 game show)
- "Funny You Should Ask", a 2013 song by The Front Bottoms from Talon of the Hawk
