= Oh, Please =

Oh, Please or Oh Please may refer to:

- Oh, Please (album), an album by the rock band Dollys
- Oh, Please!, a Broadway musical
- "Oh Please", a song on the album Evering Road
- "Oh Please", a song on the album Get What You Need
- "Oh Please", an episode of the animated television series Tayo the Little Bus
- "Oh Please", a single by Nat Thewphaingam
- "Oh Please", a single by Jammz
