= Low Year =

Studio album by Dollys
- Released: 2 March 2016
- Studio: Lake House Recording Studios
- Genres: Indie pop, indie rock
- Length: 26:00
- Label: Sniffling Indie Kids
- Producers: Erik Kase Romero, Tim Panella

Dollys chronology
Oh, Please (2015)	Low Year (2016)	tense (2017)

Low Year is the second studio album from the American rock band Dollys.

== Content ==
The ten-song album was released with Sniffling Indie Kids on 2 March 2016, as digital download and on compact disc. It was recorded at Lakehouse Recording Studios in Asbury Park, New Jersey. Low Year was engineered, mixed, produced and mastered by Erik Kase Romero, with additional engineering, mixing and mastering by Tim Panella. In an interview with Courier News, Kase Romero explains "we took just about an entire day per song just to record all the tracks to tape, which allowed us to pour all of our focus for a whole session into the aesthetic of one single tune." It is described as a "nostalgic and effervescent brand of New Brunswick-based indie-pop," and a Pirate! press release calls the album "sun-drenched grandeur, combining Beach Boys-esque vocal harmonies with psychedelic surf rock guitar licks [with] drummer Natalie Newbold's vocals guid[ing] these songs." Newbold's voice is likened to Best Coast's Bethany Cosentino, and the album draws comparison to the music of Hop Along, Lush, and Girlpool.

The single "better" was released on 15 August 2015, and "friendly" was released on 1 December 2015. The record release show for Low Year was held at Convention Hall in Asbury Park, New Jersey, on 26 February, with Lost in Society.

The album was listed No. 1 in The Top 10 Albums of 2016 by Bob Makin in The Aquarian Weekly, and is described as "ten nuggets [of] punk energy and emotionally raw lyrics." A review from Speak Into My Good Eye says "laden with anachronism and experimentation, dollys' melodic dabbling has propelled them to make an album that continually surprises," that features "thumping, jangly[,] near-reggae collaged shoegaze [and] innocent doo-wop sensibilities and swinging bass."

== Track listing ==
No.	Title	Length
1.	"too bad"	2:31
2.	"collapse"	3:13
3.	"girl"	2:11
4.	"sugartooth"	2:20
5.	"idiot"	2:10
6.	"on the mend"	2:38
7.	"another thing coming"	2:27
8.	"jukebox"	2:36
9.	"grow up"	2:34
10.	"tenant"	3:20
Total length:		26:00

== Personnel ==
- Erik Kase Romero – bass and vocals
- Jeff Lane – guitar and vocals
- Natalie Newbold – drums and vocals
