= The Front Bottoms (album) =

Studio album by The Front Bottoms
- Released: September 6, 2011
- Genre: Indie rock, folk punk, emo
- Length: 45:10
- Label: Bar/None
- Producer: The Front Bottoms

The Front Bottoms chronology
My Grandma vs. Pneumonia (2009)	The Front Bottoms (2011)	Talon of the Hawk (2013)

Professional ratings
Review scores
Source	Rating
AllMusic	4/5 stars
Absolute Punk	7.5/10 stars

The Front Bottoms is the debut studio album by New Jersey rock band The Front Bottoms, released on September 6, 2011 on Bar/None.

== Background ==
In 2008, The Front Bottoms released their first album I Hate My Friends through the social networking website MySpace. After the moderate success of the album, they released a follow-up, My Grandma Vs. Pneumonia, in 2009. This led to the band signing with Bar/None Records in mid-2010.

In February 2010, the band released an EP titled Slow Dance To Soft Rock for download on their website. They planned to also create an EP entitled Grip 'n Tie, but Bar/None pushed for them to make a full-length album instead of another EP. So they collected the songs off of Slow Dance To Soft Rock and Grip 'n Tie, and combined the two EPs into their debut self-titled album, which was released in September 2011.

== Track listing ==
All tracks are written by The Front Bottoms.

No.	Title	Length
1.	"Flashlight"	4:58
2.	"Maps"	3:35
3.	"Looking Like You Just Woke Up"	2:03
4.	"Mountain"	3:35
5.	"Rhode Island"	3:26
6.	"The Beers"	3:33
7.	"Father"	3:51
8.	"Swimming Pool"	3:37
9.	"The Boredom is the Reason I Started Swimming. It's Also the Reason I Started Sinking."	4:19
10.	"Bathtub"	3:12
11.	"Legit Tattoo Gun"	4:19
12.	"Hooped Earings"	4:41
Total length:		45:10

== Personnel ==
The Front Bottoms

- Brian Sella — vocals, guitar
- Mat Uychich — drums
- Brian Uychich — keys
- Ciaran O’Donnell — trumpet
- Drew Villafuerte — bass
- Adrianne Gold — backing vocals
