= EP1 (dollys EP) =

EP by dollys
- Released: November 9, 2013
- Recorded: November 2012 – June 2013
- Studios: Lake House Recording Studios, First Class Recording, The Headroom
- Genre: Indie pop
- Length: 19:00
- Label: Self-released
- Producer: Erik Kase Romero

Dollys chronology
EP1 (2013)	Oh, Please (2015)

EP1 is the debut studio EP from the American rock group dollys.

== Content ==
The six-track EP was self-released by dollys, on November 9, 2013. It was recorded between November 2012 and June 2013 at Lake House in Asbury Park, New Jersey, First Class Recording in Jackson, New Jersey, and The Headroom in Philadelphia, Pennsylvania. Engineering and production are by Erik Kase Romero, with additional engineering by Tim Pannella, and mastering by Tom Ruff at Asbury Media. Romero says of the home recording process, "it allowed us to have a very cosmopolitan palette of sounds and textures on the record [and] gave us the luxury of experimenting with different gear and taking our time to get the sounds we wanted." The album is compared to the music of That Dog.

The record release party was held at the Court Tavern in New Brunswick, New Jersey, on November 9, with support from Black Wine, Deal Casino and Long Beard.

== Reception ==
A review from Under the Radar says EP1 is "top tier indie pop", adding that "the intricate interplay between vocalists, playing off each other and teasing blissful melodies from the ether, is something of a much more seasoned group." Speak into My Good Eye editor Chris Rotolo describes the song "Swim" as "a collage of instrumental swells, including a familiar series of rounded fret-play that recalls a Green Paper staple titled 'The Waltz', and spans the soundscape from elaborate to minimalist."

== Track listing ==
No.	Title	Length
1.	"God Forbid"	2:17
2.	"Thermals"	4:15
3.	"Swim"	5:04
4.	"Reservoir"	2:07
5.	"Stream Dream"	2:35
6.	"Mush"	2:41
Total length:		19:00

== Personnel ==
- Erik Kase Romero – bass and vocals
- Jeff Lane – guitar, keys and vocals
- Michael Mendonez – guitar
- Natalie Newbold – drums and vocals
