= Sleeping Patterns (EP) =

EP by Toy Cars
- Released: 16 November 2016
- Genre: Indie rock
- Length: 14:15
- Labels: Sniffling Indie Kids, Counter Intuitive Records
- Producer: Erik Kase Romero

Toy Cars chronology
Letters (2015)	Sleeping Patterns (2016)	Paint Brain (2018)

Sleeping Patterns is the third studio EP from the American rock band Toy Cars.

== Content ==
The five-track EP was released on 16 November 2016 on compact disc, tape and vinyl with Sniffling Indie Kids and Counter Intuitive Records. It was engineered and produced by Erik Kase Romero, at Lakehouse Recording Studios in Asbury Park, New Jersey, mixed by Tim Pannella and Kase Romero, and mastered by Pannella. Album artwork is by Alex Brown Creative. A Pirate! press release describes Sleeping Patterns as "music that makes you feel alive because the only way to feel sadness in such depths is to have known a joy in equal measure," and the EP draws comparison to the music of Preoccupations, Titus Andronicus, Desaparecidos, and Against Me!. The opening track and lead single "Bjork" is a tongue-in-cheek tribute to the Icelandic alt-rock icon. For the fourth song "Stone," Toy Cars explains that it was "originally a track that we didn't think would end up on this record [but] it ended up becoming one of our favorites, both to play live and to record."

== Reception ==
Substream Magazine describes Sleeping Patterns as "energetic rock with hints of pop-punk, emo, and Americana all woven into a tidy little mix that should appeal to fans of everything from Moose Blood, to the Gaslight Anthem, to Arcade Fire." Bob Makin in Courier News says that the "five-track release is another great production from the dynamic team at Asbury Park's Lakehouse Recording Studios," and WMCX calls Sleeping Pattern "one hell of a record." Consequence of Sound editor Alex Gailbrath says the song "Stone" is a "propulsive monster of a track with catchy turns of phrase that wouldn't seem out of place scrawled on the front of a notebook."

== Track listing ==
No.	Title	Length
1.	"Bjork"	3:23
2.	"Books"	2:05
3.	"Dull"	2:20
4.	"Stone"	3:25
5.	"Albatross"	3:02
Total length:		14:15

== Personnel ==
- Chris Beninato – bass
- Matt Caponegro – guitar and vocals
- Matteo DeBenedetti – vocals and guitar
- Mike Linardi – drums and vocals
