= Paint Brain =

Studio album by Toy Cars
- Released: 12 January 2018
- Genre: Alternative rock, indie rock
- Length: 32:05
- Label: Self-released
- Producer: Erik Kase Romero

Toy Cars chronology
Sleeping Patterns (2016)	Paint Brain (2018)

Paint Brain is the debut studio album from the American rock band Toy Cars.

== Content ==
The twelve-track album was self-released on compact disc and digital download, on 12 January 2018. It was produced and engineered by Erik Kase Romero, at Lakehouse Recording Studios in Asbury Park, New Jersey, mixed by Tim Pannella at Cedar Sound Studios, and mastered by Drew Lavyne at All Digital Mastering. The album artwork is by Lora Ann Poulin. In an interview with The Pop Break, Matt DeBenedetti explains Paint Brain is a "slightly different artistic direction [and] we experimented with some newer stuff we have never touched upon previously and the result was a few songs on this record that we think stand out artistically more than the others." The song "Iron Me Out" is about "learning to get through the feeling of complicity and not get caught up with getting too comfortable." "Iron Me Out" and "Erie" were featured in the January 2018 editions of Alternative Press' Songs You Need to Hear.

The record release party for Paint Brain was on 19 January 2018, at House of Independents in Asbury Park, New Jersey, with latewaves, Halogens, DRMCTCHR, and Well Wisher.

== Reception ==
Paint Brain is described as having a "classic indie-rock feel, occasionally throwing in keyboards and plucked string instruments into the guitar-bass-drums mix that is traditional to indie rock [and a] go-to record to listen to on long drives with the windows down" by The Daily Targum. The Spill Magazine rated the album three-and-a-half out of five stars, saying "Toy Cars brings the youthful exuberance of independence," and add that the album "ventur[es] into the realms of spacious Americana-influenced indie [with] willingness to shed comparison to early-2000s-inspired New Jersey emo." A review of the song "Iron Me Out" in Impose says it "drives with propulsive rhythms, searing guitars, waves crashing breakdowns and a soaring chorus as a classic NJ theme is examined; getting unstuck."

== Track listing ==
No.	Title	Length
1.	"Paint Brain"	2:05
2.	"Cold"	2:54
3.	"Cobwebs"	3:28
4.	"Truth Be Told"	3:18
5.	"Leaving A/B"	3:18
6.	"Iron Me Out"	3:19
7.	"Track 7"	3:08
8.	"Swim"	2:20
9.	"Erie"	2:43
10.	"Jimmy & Quinn"	1:13
11.	"Tread"	2:01
12.	"Sarah 1908"	2:18
Total length:		32:05

== Personnel ==
- Chris Beninato – bass
- Matt Caponegro – guitar and vocals
- Matteo DeBenedetti – vocals and guitar
- Mike Linardi – drums and vocals

=== Additional musician ===
- Jenna Murphy – vocals on Leaving A/B," "Iron Me Out" and "Erie"
- Natalie Newbold – "Leaving A/B"
- Erik Kase Romero – keyboards, plucked piano and Hammond B3 on "Leaving A/B," "Iron Me Out," "Erie" and "Jimmy & Quinn"
