= Going Grey =

Studio album by The Front Bottoms
- Released: October 13, 2017
- Length: 37:41
- Label: Fueled by Ramen

The Front Bottoms chronology
Back on Top (2015)	Going Grey (2017)	Ann (EP) (2018)

Professional ratings
Aggregate scores
Source	Rating
Metacritic	78/100
Review scores
Source	Rating
AllMusic	3.5/5 stars
Exclaim!	8/10
Pitchfork	5.8/10

Going Grey is the fourth studio album by American folk punk band The Front Bottoms. It was released on October 13, 2017 through Fueled by Ramen.

== Track listing ==
No.	Title	Length
1.	"You Used To Say (Holy Fuck)"	4:00
2.	"Peace Sign"	3:12
3.	"Bae"	2:56
4.	"Vacation Town"	3:45
5.	"Don't Fill Up On Chips"	3:04
6.	"Grand Finale"	3:19
7.	"Trampoline"	3:37
8.	"Raining"	3:03
9.	"Far Drive"	3:12
10.	"Everyone But You"	3:30
11.	"Ocean"	4:03
Total length:		37:34

== Charts ==
Chart	Peak position
US Billboard 200	47
US Top Alternative Albums (Billboard)	6
US Top Rock Albums (Billboard)	8
