= YJY =

American indie rock band

- Origin: Hightstown, New Jersey, U.S.
- Genres: Indie rock
- Years active: 2014–2017
- Labels: Sniffling Indie Kids
- Members: Tim Fitzpatrick; Ricky Lorenzo; Dave Sachs; Steve Sachs

YJY was an American indie rock band from New Jersey.

== History ==
YJY is a four-piece indie rock group from Hightstown, New Jersey, that in formed 2014. The name is a symbol, with the Y's as crying eyes, and the J as a nose. YJY's first release, the five-track EP Couch Surfin USA, was released with Sniffling Indie Kids, on July 7, 2015. It was recorded in two days at 1989 Recordings. Described as "fuzz-indie pop laced with humor and emotion," it won The Deli's Best of 2015 Open Submission Poll. YJY contributed the song "Somebody Take My Phone" for the 2nd annual charity compilation 24 Hour Songwriting Challenge. Their second release, the four-track EP The Same Noise, was released on August 19, 2016. Jim Testa calls the EP "chimey indie pop that combines cocky, youthful vocals with reverb-y guitars and infectious melodies." They performed at the 2016 North Jersey Indie Rock Festival.

The full-length album, entitled The Enduring YJY, was released on June 17, 2017. It was listed in Jersey Beat's 2017 Best Albums. YJY played their final show at Asbury Park Music Foundation, with Avery and The Man Devils, Jeff Lane, Julian Fulton and the Zombie Gospel, and NGHTCRWLRS, on June 17, 2017.

== Members ==
- Tim Fitzpatrick – bass
- Ricky Lorenzo – vocals and guitar
- Dave Sachs – drums
- Steve Sachs – vocals and guitar

== Discography ==
Albums

- The Enduring YJY (2017)

EPs

- Couch Surfin USA (2015)
- The Same Noise (2016)

Appearing on

- Second Annual 24 Hour Songwriting Challenge (2015)
