= This Is Fine =

This is Fine

Studio album by Well Wisher
- Released: 28 September 2018
- Genre: Indie pop
- Length: 30:06
- Label: 6131 Records
- Producer: Erik Kase Romero

This is Fine is the debut studio album from the American pop band Well Wisher.

== Content ==
The eleven-track album was released digitally and on vinyl with 6131 Records, on 28 September 2018. It was recorded in a rented home in the Poconos, and was produced and engineered by Erik Kase Romero, with additional engineering by Anthony Yebra, and mixing and mastering by Tim Panella at Cedar Sound Studios. Album photography is by Jenna Murphy, and design by SPR and the New Language. The album cover of a burning doll is a reference to the breakup of Newbold's former band, dollys. This is Fine is described as blending punk sonics and pop melodies, and it draws comparison to the music of Julien Baker, Joyce Manor, Thin Lips, and Kississippi.

The song "Believe" was released on 12 September 2018, and Newbold explains it is about "realizing that friends who don't champion you are not worth your time [and] it's so important to surround yourself with friends who want to support you." In anticipation of This is Fine, Well Wisher released the single "I Know Better" a week before the album release, and it is described as "catchy and fun." The band says the song "is about doing everything you can to try and be the bigger person even if it means taking in some pretty hard blows."

The record release show was on 6 October at Asbury Park Brewery, with ManDancing, latewaves, and Slingshot Dakota.

== Reception ==
Music journalist Bob Makin says he "love[s] the way the band stop[s] on a dime to accentuate a certain part of a song, and also the way some songs build from a sweet, soft start into a magnificent mash-up reminiscent of Nirvana." He notes the song "Half Bad" is a "pop groove underneath a sense of melancholy, like a cross between the Jam and the Smiths." Bobby Olivier of NJ.com ranks the album at No. 17 in his New Jersey's 18 best albums of 2018, and writes "[this] was one of my most anticipated releases of 2018 and this crunchy, hook-loaded debut was just as good as advertised. Pop-punk and emo fans alike will find tracks to love here." New Noise rates This is Fine four-and-a-half out of five stars, saying "like summer, [the album] flies by, leaving pleasant memories and a longing for a return of that sweet warmth," adding it has a "poppy sound, deeply personal subject matter, and variety of composition[s] [that] make for a phenomenal debut." A review in Riff says that "Well Wisher puts everything on the table and proves its not afraid to wear its heart and influence on its sleeve."

The song "I Know Better" is listed in The Asbury Park Press's 12 best Jersey songs of 2018, who describe it as "a raw, fuzzed-out punk thing that'll drop the chorus in your head for a couple of days." Speak Into My Good Eye calls the song "an immediately catchy piece of indie-pop-punk as Newbold rebukes an ex who says one thing and does another." Substream Magazine says "Believe" has "one of the most satisfying riffs you've heard this year [and] Newbold's verses float along melodically, punctuated by a perfectly dense and punchy chorus that hits the listener straight in the chest."

== Track listing ==
No.	Title	Length
1.	"Believe"	2:30
2.	"Sweet"	2:54
3.	"Why Not You"	3:00
4.	"Sad Like Me"	3:40
5.	"I Know Better"	2:30
6.	"Right as Rain"	3:28
7.	"Leave Me Like You Do"	2:34
8.	"All My Love"	3:22
9.	"Half Bad"	3:13
10.	"Waste My Time"	2:53
Total length:		30:06

== Personnel ==
- Anthony D'Arcangelo – drums, percussion and gang vocals
- Lucas Dalakian – guitar, drones and gang vocals
- Natalie Newbold – guitar, vocals and keys
- Lynsey Vandenberg – bass and background vocals
