= The Front Bottoms =

American rock band

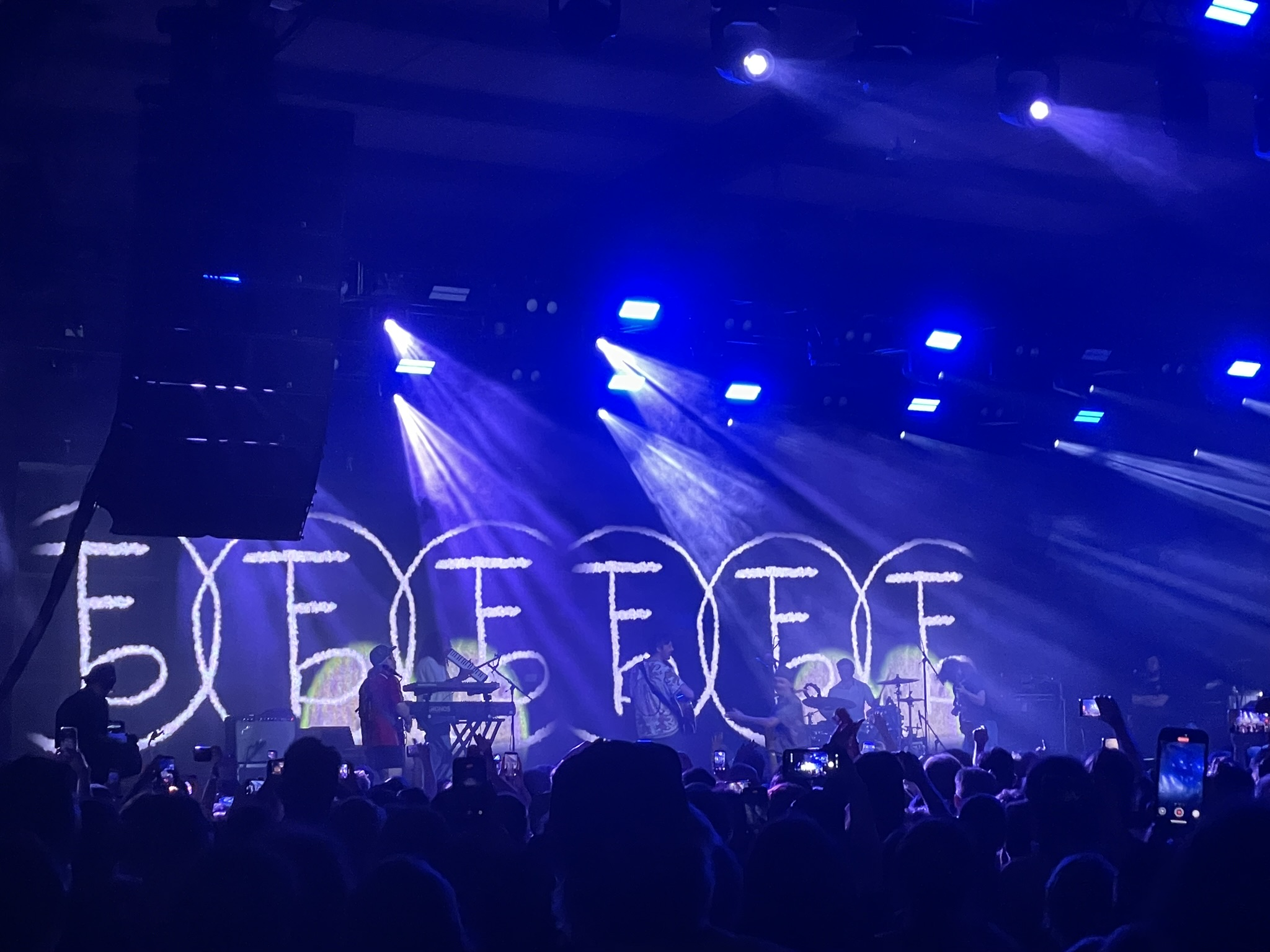
- The Front Bottoms performing at the Outbreak Festival in Manchester in 2026

Background information
- Origin: Woodcliff Lake, New Jersey, U.S.
- Genres: Folk punk; folk rock; indie rock; Midwest emo
- Years active: 2006–present
- Labels: Bar/None; Fueled by Ramen; Elektra
- Members: Brian Sella; Mathew Uychich
- Past members: Brian Uychich; Ciaran O'Donnell
- Website: thefrontbottoms.com

The Front Bottoms are an American rock band from Woodcliff Lake, New Jersey, formed in 2006. They are currently a duo consisting of lead vocalist and guitarist Brian Sella and drummer Mat Uychich. During live performances, they are currently accompanied by touring members, including guitarist and backing vocalist AJ Peacox, bassist and backing vocalist Natalie Newbold, and bassist, guitarist and backing vocalist Erik Kase Romero.

Their music has also been described as rock, indie rock, folk punk and, according to Sella, indie pop or acoustic pop. Lyrically, their music has also been described as being adjacent to Midwest emo.

== History ==
=== Early years (2006–2010) ===
The group formed in 2006 in Woodcliff Lake, New Jersey. In August 2007, after Brian Sella (vocals, guitar, lyricist) finished his first year at Ramapo College, he and childhood friend Mathew Uychich (drums) began playing together under the name The Front Bottoms. Soon after, Uychich's brother, Brian Uychich, (keyboard, vocals) began sitting in on their practices. Brian asked to join the band, playing an old keyboard he found in the Uychich family attic. This completed the original lineup, with which the first two albums and EP were recorded. The band's name is a reference to the film Sexy Beast, in which Ben Kingsley’s character claims he was sexually assaulted by someone who touched his “front bottom.” Frontman Sella said of it, "This is our name. If you don't like it then you don't like it."

They spent the next few years playing locally around New Jersey and eventually doing extensive tours around the country. In between tours, Sella worked at the Shop Rite in Ramsey, New Jersey and Uychich worked in landscaping. During this time, they put out a self-released album, I Hate My Friends, in 2008. Then they released an EP, Brothers Can't Be Friends, the same year. They released a second album in 2009, My Grandma vs Pneumonia. Additionally, a five-song cassette, Calm Down and Breathe, was handmade by the band in 2009, and limited to 30 copies. They were part of the New Brunswick-based artist collective Tiny Giant.

=== Independent years (2010–2015) ===
Around 2010, the band started writing material for what would become their self-titled album. They released an EP called Slow Dance To Soft Rock which contained six tracks later remastered for the LP. A second EP, Grip N' Tie, was planned to be released later that year but was canceled. The songs that were on it were instead combined with the previous EP to produce an entire album. In late 2010, the band filmed a music video for "Maps", after being contacted through Myspace by an anonymous filmmaker, which gave them more exposure. On June 2, 2011, the band had announced that they signed with Bar/None Records and would release their self-titled debut studio album on September 6, 2011.

As of late 2010, Brian Uychich left the band to concentrate on school full-time. The Front Bottoms replaced Uychich with a new touring musician, Drew Villafuerte, who played bass in addition to keyboards. In 2012, Villafuerte stopped touring with the band as well, citing the extensive touring as too difficult. He was replaced by Tom Warren and Ciaran O'Donnell.

In March 2013, the band released a video for "Twin Size Mattress" on YouTube in the promotion of their next record. Their second studio album, Talon of the Hawk, was released on May 21, 2013.

On June 17, 2014, the band released a six-song EP, Rose. The EP was named for Mathew Uychich's grandmother Rosemary, who is depicted in the cover art. The music video for "Twelve Feet Deep" shows the band, along with audience members at a live show, wearing masks of Rosemary's face as depicted on the album cover.

On April 18, 2015, Run for Cover and Bar/None Records released two songs by the band, and two songs by rapper GDP on Liberty and Prosperity, a split EP.

=== Fueled by Ramen (2015–present) ===
In June 2015, it was announced they had signed to the label Fueled by Ramen. The Front Bottoms released their third studio album Back on Top on September 18, 2015, via Fueled by Ramen.

On March 7, 2016, they released a new song, "Noodle Monster", on the Fueled by Ramen YouTube Channel. On June 26, 2016, Pitchfork released a music video for the song "Ginger" from Back on Top. The video was directed by Marlon Brandope and shot in Cranston, Rhode Island.

Preceded by the single "Raining", the band released their fourth studio album, Going Grey, on October 13, 2017.

In an interview in February 2018, Sella confirmed the release of the Ann EP, the second in the 'Grandma series'. The EP was released on May 18, 2018, via Fueled by Ramen, and a music video for its final song, "Tie Dye Dragon", was released on March 16.

On December 20, 2019, they released the song "Camouflage" and an accompanying music video. This was followed by the song "Everyone Blooms" and its video on April 17, 2020.

On July 3, 2020, the band announced their album In Sickness & in Flames and released the song "Montgomery Forever" with its video. On August 14, 2020, they released the song "Fairbanks, Alaska", and the album on August 21, 2020. Reviews of In Sickness and in Flames, were mixed. Reviewing for NME, Samantha Maine praises the band's work, calling the album "a sharp and unflinching collection that harks back to the magic of their 2011 self-titled debut. The New Jersey folk-punk band took a creative risk with 2017's synth-packed 'Going Grey', and 'In Sickness & In Flames' finds them returning to more familiar territory, confirming their ability to mine millennial angst with verve." Pitchfork Media reviewer Julia Gray, on the other hand, argues, "The album is twee and punk and neither of those things. It's understandable that the Front Bottoms, a band whose legacy revolves around post-adolescent growing pains, have lost some of the spark that fueled their first six albums."

On September 2, 2022, the band released the Theresa EP via Elektra Records, with five re-recorded versions of unreleased fan favorites and oldies that serve as the third installment of the band's popular Grandma EP series.

On April 17, 2023, the band released the song "Outlook", along with an accompanying music video. At the same time, the band announced their next album, You Are Who You Hang Out With, would be released on August 4, 2023. On April 25, they announced a tour for the album, starting on August 1, 2023, including an album release show at Red Rocks Amphitheatre the night of the album release. Supporting acts include Kevin Devine & the Goddamn Band.

The band also released two new music videos for two new songs, one on June 8, 2023, called Punching Bag, and one on July 13, 2023, called Emotional. Both songs were from the upcoming album, “You Are Who You Hang Out With”, which released on August 4, 2023. The album was met with mostly positive reviews. Many reviews identified the pop undertones, critic Quinn Gill noted that some fans feel as though the band is out of its golden age, but followed by writing “the duo has proven that it would rather try a million new things than grow stagnant”.

It was also announced that The Front Bottoms will be opening for Zach Bryan for his 3 shows at MetLife Stadium in July 2025, along with Kings of Leon. Originally, the shows, spanning from July 18 to July 20, were only slated to have Kings of Leon opening; however, it was announced via Zach Bryan’s Instagram story that The Front Bottoms would be opening as well. Bryan has stated his admiration for the band in the past, as he previously posted on X “[sic] bro after my record deal I’m making a good midwest punk record, that is the best music in my opinion” with which he included a picture of the album cover for The Front Bottom’s second album, Talon of the Hawk.

== Inspirations ==
Sella has stated that the band's inspirations are Blink-182, Say Anything, Bright Eyes, The Mountain Goats, and New Jersey itself. According to Uychich, their only inspiration is their friends. The band is also influenced by Senses Fail and other mid-2000s pop-punk bands.

== Band members ==
Current members
- Brian Sella – vocals, guitar (2007–present)
- Mathew Uychich – drums (2007–present)

Current touring members

- Erik Kase Romero – bass, guitar, backing vocals (2017–present)
- Natalie Newbold – bass, backing vocals (2020–present)
- AJ Peacox – guitar, backing vocals (2022–present)
- Roshane Karunaratne – keys, melodica, keytar (2017–present)

Former touring musicians

- Brian Uychich – keys, backing vocals (2007–2010)
- Drew Villafuerte – bass, keys (2010–2012)
- Ciaran O'Donnell – guitar, trumpet, keys (2012–2017)
- Tom Warren – bass guitar, vocals (2012–2017), guitar, vocals (2017–2019)
- Jenn Fantaccione – violin, trumpet, cello, backing vocals (2017–2019)

Timeline

== Discography ==
=== Studio albums ===
List of studio albums, with selected chart positions, showing other relevant details
Title	Details	Peak chart positions			
Title	Details	US	US Alt	US Indie	US Rock
I Hate My Friends	Released: 2008; Label: Self-released; Formats: Digital download	–	–	–	–
My Grandma vs. Pneumonia	Released: 2009; Label: Self-released; Formats: Digital download	–	–	–	–
The Front Bottoms	Released: September 27, 2011; Label: Bar/None; Formats: LP, 2x10-inch vinyl, CD, digital download, streaming	–	–	–	–
Talon of the Hawk	Released: May 21, 2013; Label: Bar/None, Antique; Formats: LP, CD, cassette, digital download, streaming	181	–	30	47
Back on Top	Released: September 18, 2015; Label: Fueled by Ramen; Formats: LP, CD, digital download, streaming	32	6	–	10
Going Grey	Released: October 13, 2017; Label: Fueled by Ramen; Formats: LP, CD, digital download, streaming	47	6	–	8
In Sickness & in Flames	Released: August 21, 2020; Label: Fueled by Ramen; Formats: LP, CD, digital download, streaming	– (Note: In Sickness & in Flames did not enter the Billboard 200 but peaked at number 41 on the Top Album Sales component chart.)	–	–	–
You Are Who You Hang Out With	Released: August 8, 2023; Label: Fueled by Ramen; Formats: LP, CD, digital download, streaming	– (Note: You Are Who You Hang Out With did not enter the Billboard 200 but peaked at number 51 on the Top Album Sales component chart.)	–	–	–

=== Extended plays ===
List of studio albums, with selected chart positions, showing other relevant details
Title	Details	Peak chart positions		
Title	Details	US	US Indie	US Rock
Brothers Can't Be Friends	Released: 2008; Label: Self-released; Formats: Digital download	–	–	–
Slow Dance to Soft Rock	Released: February 27, 2010; Label: Self-released; Formats: Digital download	–	–	–
Summer of Steroids	Released: October 24, 2011; Label: Bar/None; Formats: 7-inch vinyl	–	–	–
Rose	Released: June 17, 2014; Label: Bar/None; Formats: 12-inch vinyl, CD, digital download, streaming	195	28	47
Liberty and Prosperity (with GDP)	Released: August 18, 2015; Label: Bar/None, Run for Cover; Formats: 7-inch vinyl, digital download, streaming	–	–	–
Needy When I'm Needy	Released: October 14, 2016; Label: Fueled by Ramen; Formats: 7-inch vinyl, cassette, digital download, streaming	–	–	–
Ann	Released: May 18, 2018; Label: Fueled by Ramen, Wuakaskole, Screwball Enterprise; Formats: 12-inch vinyl, digital download, streaming	– (Note: Ann did not enter the Billboard 200 but peaked at number 70 on the Top Album Sales component chart.)	–	–
Devinyl Splits No. 12 (with Kevin Devine)	Released: March 29, 2019; Label: Bad Timing, Many Hats Distribution; Formats: 7-inch vinyl, digital download, streaming	–	–	–
Ukulele Versions	Released: June 19, 2020; Label: Self-released; Formats: digital download	–	–	–
IS&IF Demos	Released: April 24, 2021; Label: Self-released; Formats: digital download	–	–	–
Theresa	Released: September 2, 2022; Label: Elektra; Formats: digital download, streaming	–	–	–

=== Singles ===
List of studio albums, with selected chart positions, showing other relevant details
Title	Year	Peak chart positions	Album
Title	Year	US Alt	Album
"Cough it Out"	2015	–	Back on Top
"West Virginia"	2015	–	Back on Top
"Help"	2015	–	Back on Top
"Laugh Till I Cry"	2015	–	Back on Top
"Summer Shandy"	2015	–	Back on Top
"Get Numb"	2017	–	Non-album single
"Vacation Town	2017	–	Going Grey
"Peace Sign"	2018	36	Going Grey
"End of Summer (Now I Know)"	2018	–	Non-album single
"Allentown" (Manchester Orchestra)	2018	–	Non-album single
"Camouflage"	2020	–	In Sickness & in Flames
"Everyone Blooms"	2020	–	In Sickness & in Flames
"Voodoo Magic"	2021	–	Non-album single
"Loverboy"	2021	–	Non-album single
"More Than it Hurts You"	2022	–	Theresa
"Outlook"	2023	-	You Are Who You Hang Out With
"Punching Bag"	2023	-	You Are Who You Hang Out With
"Emotional"	2023	-	You Are Who You Hang Out With

=== Music videos ===
- "Maps" (2010)
- "Swimming Pool" (2011)
- "Flashlight" (2011)
- "Christmas Wrapping" (2011)
- "Mountain" (2013)
- "Twin Size Mattress" (2013)
- "Skeleton" (2013)
- "Funny You Should Ask" (2013)
- "Backflip" (2014)
- "12 Feet Deep" (2014)
- "West Virginia" (2015)
- "Cough It Out" (2015)
- "HELP" (2015)
- "Laugh Till I Cry" (2015)
- "Summer Shandy" (2015)
- "Ginger" (2016)
- "2YL" (2016)
- "Raining" (2017)
- "Vacation Town" (2017)
- "Peace Sign" (2017)
- "Everyone But You" (2018)
- "Lonely Eyes" (2018)
- "Tie Dye Dragon" (2018)
- "camouflage" (2019)
- "everyone blooms." (2020)
- "montgomery forever" (2020)
- "Fairbanks, Alaska" (2020)
- "Voodoo Magic" (2021)
- "Emotional" (2023)
- "Paris" (2023)
