= Talon of the Hawk =

Studio album by The Front Bottoms
- Released: May 21, 2013
- Genres: Indie rock, folk punk, emo
- Length: 42:26
- Label: Bar/None
- Producers: Chris "Frenchie" Smith, Sean Rolie

The Front Bottoms chronology
The Front Bottoms (2011)	Talon of the Hawk (2013)	Back on Top (2015)

Professional ratings
Review scores
Source	Rating
AllMusic	4/5 stars
Absolute Punk	9/10 stars
Under the Gun Review	9/10

Talon of the Hawk is the second studio album by American rock band The Front Bottoms, released on May 21, 2013 on Bar/None Records.

== Album title ==
The album's title is partly inspired by the character, Hawk, from the television series, Twin Peaks. Vocalist and guitarist Brian Sella stated: "I have this thing with pocket knives; I think they’re kind of cool. I was sitting in the van and drew this pocket knife. My girlfriend and I were watching Twin Peaks, and there’s this police officer on the show that’s called Hawk. I thought it was a badass nickname. So on the picture with the pocket knife, I wrote underneath it “Talon Of The Hawk,” just because it popped into my head and thought it was kind of cool. As it was getting close to the time we needed to make a decision on the album name, I found the picture with the pocket knife that I had drawn in the van coming back from recording. I just said the name and everyone kind of just agreed, and that's how it came up."

== Special edition ==
On February 22, 2023, a 10-year celebratory special edition vinyl was announced alongside an album specific tour. This edition features the original artwork Sella created as the cover art.

== Track listing ==
All tracks are written by The Front Bottoms.

No.	Title	Length
1.	"Au Revoir (Adios)"	1:48
2.	"Skeleton"	3:35
3.	"Swear to God the Devil Made Me Do It"	3:31
4.	"Twin Size Mattress"	4:24
5.	"Peach"	3:05
6.	"Santa Monica"	4:07
7.	"The Feud"	3:14
8.	"Funny You Should Ask"	3:33
9.	"Tattooed Tears"	3:51
10.	"Lone Star"	3:50
11.	"Backflip"	3:45
12.	"Everything I Own"	3:43
Total length:		42:26

== Personnel ==
The Front Bottoms

- Brian Sella – vocals, guitar
- Mat Uychich – drums
- Tom Warren – bass
- Ciaran O'Donnell – keys, trumpet, guitar

== Charts ==
Chart (2013)	Peak position
US Billboard 200	181
US Independent Albums (Billboard)	30
US Indie Store Album Sales (Billboard)	17
US Top Album Sales (Billboard)	36
US Top Rock Albums (Billboard)	47

2023 weekly chart performance
Chart (2023)	Peak position
US Americana/Folk Albums (Billboard)	20
US Vinyl Albums (Billboard)	12
