= Oh, Please (album) =

Studio album by dollys
- Released: June 19, 2015
- Studios: Lakehouse Recording Studios, Asbury Park, New Jersey
- Genres: Indie pop, indie rock
- Length: 26:09
- Label: Sniffling Indie Kids
- Producer: Erik Kase Romero

Dollys chronology
EP1 (2013)	Oh, Please (2015)	low year (2016)

Oh, Please is the debut studio album from the American rock group dollys.

== Content ==
The nine-track album was released in June 2015. It was recorded at Lakehouse Recording Studios in Asbury Park, New Jersey. The recording was made using analog tape and did not use any pitch correction or digital enhancement.

== Reception ==
Oh, Please was listed in the Asbury Park Press' top nine New Jersey indie albums of 2015, who described it as "fey indie-pop delivered with reverb and charm". Phil Sheppard of Speak Into My Good Eye wrote that there is a "pure and energetic innocence within this nine song album. Drifting melodies along with a very dreamy and ethereal quality. Indie pop with undertones of the 1960s." Joseph Hess of the Riverfront Times praised the album's simple composition, "strong leads and special attention to texture".

== Track listing ==
No.	Title	Length
1.	"Shameful"	2:48
2.	"Oh, Please"	2:42
3.	"Bottles"	2:57
4.	"Lilypad"	3:14
5.	"Heavy Head"	3:20
6.	"Anywhere"	3:23
7.	"Garden Path"	2:34
8.	"Waiting"	2:46
9.	"Puddles"	2:25
Total length:		26:09

== Personnel ==
- Erik Kase Romero – bass and vocals
- Jeff Lane – guitar, keys and vocals
- Michael Mendonez – guitar
- Natalie Newbold – drums and vocals
