= Well Wisher =

American indie pop band

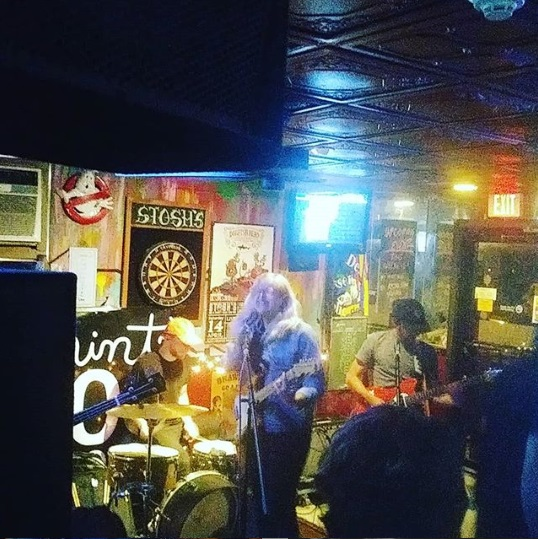
- Well Wisher at Stoshs on 13 April 2018.

Background information
- Origin: Asbury Park, New Jersey, U.S.
- Genres: Indie, pop rock
- Years active: 2016–current
- Labels: Sniffling Indie Kids, 6131 Records
- Spinoff of: dollys
- Members: Lucas Dalakian; Natalie Newbold; Lynsey Vandenberg; Matt Viani
- Website: www.wellwishernj.com

Well Wisher is an American indie pop group from New Jersey.

== History ==
Well Wisher is a four-piece from Asbury Park, New Jersey, that formed in 2016. Natalie Newbold and Erik Kase Romero of dollys were rehearsing songs, along with Michael Linardi, and after the disbandment of dollys in 2017, they formed Well Wisher. Newbold explains in an interview with The Pop Break that following the breakup of dollys, "I started each day by writing for an hour" for Well Wisher. They are described as "mak[ing] very catchy indie-punk[;] sound[ing] like the middle ground between Joyce Manor and Julien Baker" by BrooklynVegan. Phil Sheperd of Speak Into My Good Eye says of a 2017 performance, Well Wisher is a "prime trio [that] represents all that is good in the world." Newbold cites musical influences for Well Wisher from the Beatles, Brian Wilson, Elliott Smith, Built to Spill, Superchunk and the Pixies. They released the single "i'll go" with "rumours," on 13 November 2016.

=== This is Fine ===
In anticipation of their debut album, This is Fine, the song "I Know Better" was released on 21 September 2018, and it is described as "catchy and fun, making light of stressful issues." Well Wisher commented that the song "is about doing everything you can to try and be the bigger person even if it means taking in some pretty hard blows." In reference to Newbold's prior band, the album artwork for This is Fine features a Barbie doll engulfed in flames. The album is listed at No. 17 in NJ.com's New Jersey music's 18 best albums of 2018, and the editor writes it "was one of my most anticipated releases of 2018 and this crunchy, hook-loaded debut was just as good as advertised. Pop-punk and emo fans alike will find tracks to love here." Well Wisher performed at the 2019 South by Southwest music festival.

== Discography ==
Albums

- This is Fine (2018)

Singles

- "i'll go" (2016)

== Members ==
- Lucas Dalakian – guitar and vocals
- Natalie Newbold – vocals and guitar
- Lynsey Vandenberg – bass and backing vocals
- Matt Viani – drums

Past members

- Anthony D'Arcangelo – drums
- Kwame Korkor
- Chris Loporto
- Biff Swenson – drums
