= GDP (musician) =

American rapper

- Born: Matthew Miller
- Origin: West Orange, New Jersey
- Genre: Hip-hop
- Years active: 2008–present
- Website: g6d6p6.bandcamp.com

Matthew Miller, better known by his stage name GDP, is an American hip-hop recording artist from West Orange, New Jersey.

== History ==
GDP began in 2008 with the release of a split with Dirty Money. The following year he released his debut full-length album, titled Realistic Expectations via Say-10 Records. In 2010, GDP released his first cassette titled Magic Bullet via Ride The Fury Records.

In 2011, GDP released his second full-length album titled Useless Eaters via Run For Cover Records.

In 2013, GDP released a Vinyl with The Wrong Address, titled Holla via Run For Cover.

In 2014, GDP released a compilation album titled Collectibles via Smokers Cough and Ride The Fury. In March 2014, The Front Bottoms announced at the South by Southwest music festival plans to release a split with GDP sometime in the future. The 7" split was officially announced the following year and was released on April 18, 2015 (Record Store Day).

== Discography ==
Studio albums

- Realistic Expectations (2009) (Say-10)
- Useless Eaters (2011, Run For Cover)
- Holla (2013, Run For Cover)

EP's

- Involvement (2007, Division East Records)
- Makeup Smearing Python (2012, Smokers Cough)
- Magic Bullet 2 (2016, Ride The Fury)

Vinyl / Splits

- GDP, Dirty Money 7" (2008, Division East)
- The Front Bottoms, GDP 7" (2015, Bar/None Records, Run For Cover Records)
- Holla (2013, Run For Cover Records)

Cassettes

- Magic Bullet cassette (2009, Ride The Fury Records)
- Tunnel Buddies cassette (2012, Ride The Fury Records)

Compilations

- Instrumental Installations Vol. 1 (Bandcamp exclusive)
- Collectibles (2014, Smokers Cough, Ride The Fury)
