= Deal Casino =

American alternative rock band

- Origin: Sparta Township, New Jersey, U.S.
- Genres: Alternative rock; pop rock; indie rock
- Years active: 2013–2020
- Past members: Joe Parella; Jozii Cowell; Jon Rodney; Christopher Donofrio
- Website: dealcasinomusic.com

Deal Casino was an American alternative rock band formed in Sparta, New Jersey in 2013. The band consisted of members Joe Parella (lead vocals, guitar), Jozii Cowell (guitar), Jon Rodney (bass), and Christopher Donofrio (drums).

== History ==
The members of Deal Casino originally started playing together in elementary school, eventually forming a band called Something About January. After dropping their original name and changing their approach to music, the band found itself with an opportunity to play the 2012 Bamboozle Music Festival in Asbury Park, New Jersey. The band had to pick up their artist passes for the festival at the Deal Casino Beach Club in Deal, New Jersey. "The band didn’t have a name at the time, so the people running the show over there didn’t believe we were the band we said we were, so we ended up waiting seven hours to get our passes. A few months later, we started recording our first EP, and at that point we really needed a band name. Deal Casino seemed fitting."

Originating from Sparta, New Jersey, all four bandmates formed the group in their early twenties. Shortly after forming in 2013, the quartet decided to move to, live, and work in the heart of the Asbury Park music scene. Joe Parella worked at the recording studio where the band practiced, and the others worked in restaurants and a flower shop. Deal Casino played The Saint for 12 weeks in the Summer of 2014. The shows were recorded, and the band reportedly watched them the next day, taking notes, analyzing them, and planning their improvement like a sports team would. By December 2014, Deal Casino dominated the Asbury Park Music Awards, drawing comparisons with early Smashing Pumpkins and winning more awards than any other group, including Best Pop/Rock Band, Best Vocalist, and Best Live Performance. From their formation in 2013 to 2015, Deal Casino averaged a show a week.

On July 14, 2017, the band released their debut self-titled album, Deal Casino. In November 2018, Deal Casino released their second studio album, LLC. Before recording the record, the band decided they wanted to leave their comfort zones and "get out of Asbury Park". As a result, the album was recorded at a studio in North Carolina. Shortly after the release of LLC, the group toured with The Wrecks.

In 2019, drummer Christopher Donofrio exited the band. In September 2020, Parella announced via a post on the band's official Instagram page that, as of early 2020, Deal Casino was no longer a band, with Cowell and Rodney going separate ways, albeit "on good terms and as friends". Parella continues to make music independently.

Parella, who performs under the name Joe P, released an EP titled Emily Can't Sing in 2021. The fifth track, "Off My Mind”, sits at over 44 million streams on Spotify.

== Musical Style ==
The band's sound has been described as "urgent, groove-heavy" and "boisterous, bouncing rock sound not so far from Neon Trees or Young the Giant," though some object to this characterization. Parella's style has been described as similar to Trees vocalist Tyler Glenn. The band kept their sound very raw to achieve a live, stark, but polished sound. Their early sound was characterized by contrasts between subdued, mellow, and loud, anthem-like sounds. Their lyrics have been described as raw, confessional, and picturesque, similar to those of Arcade Fire and Klaxons. Deal Casino has been described as "an explosive live act, ramping up and tearing around the stage as if possessed."

== Personnel ==
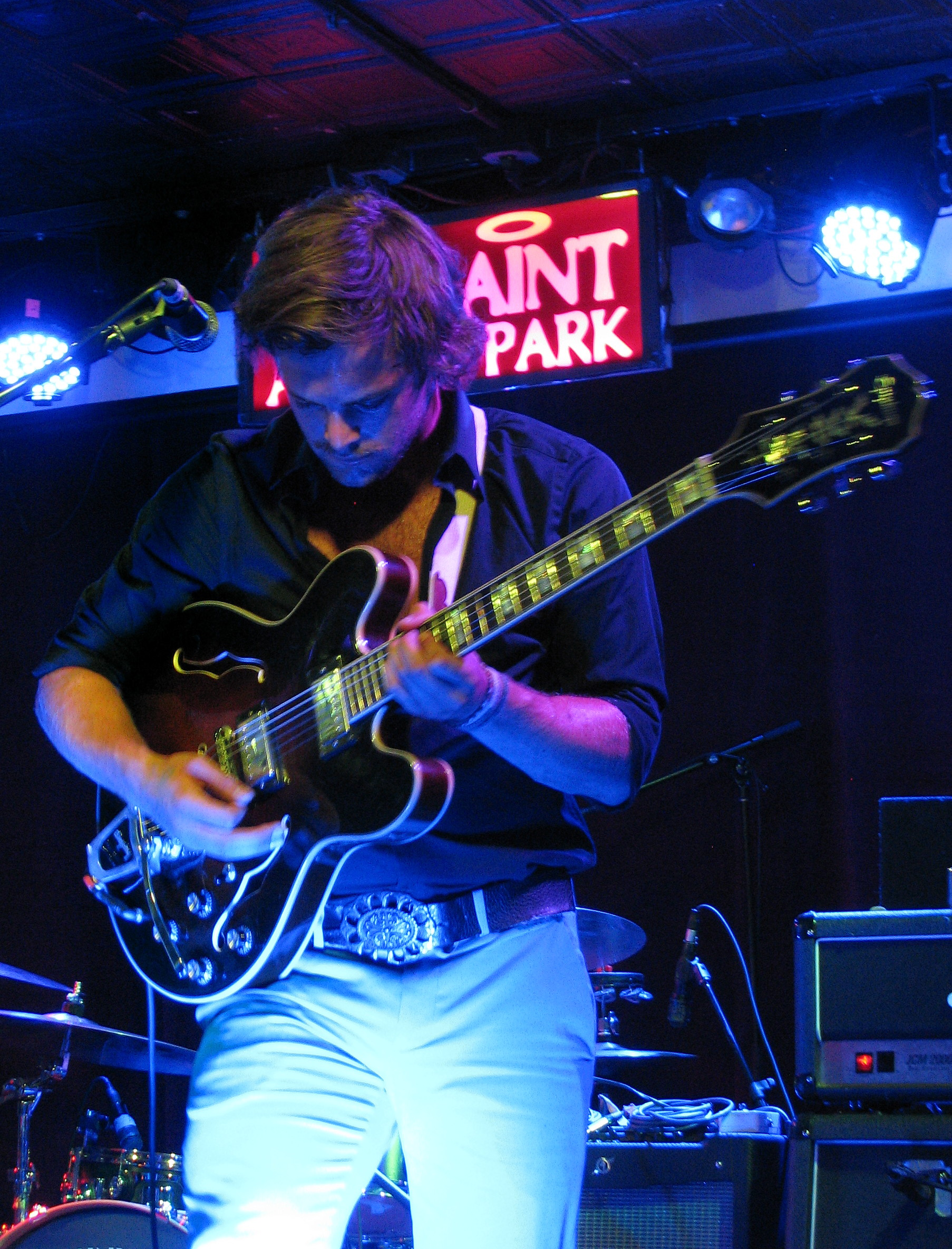
Deal Casino on stage on July 21, 2014.

- Joe Parella — lead vocals, guitar (2013–2020)
- Jozii Cowell — guitar (2013–2020)
- Jon Rodney — bass (2013–2020)
- Christopher Donofrio — drums (2013–2019)

== Discography ==
Studio albums

- Deal Casino (2017)
- LLC (2018)

EPs

- Cocaine Love (2013)
- The Runaways (2013)
- Heck (2014)
- Nika (2015)
- Human Cannonball (2016)
- Isadora Duncan (2018)
- Woof (2020)
