= Jackson Pines =

American folk rock band

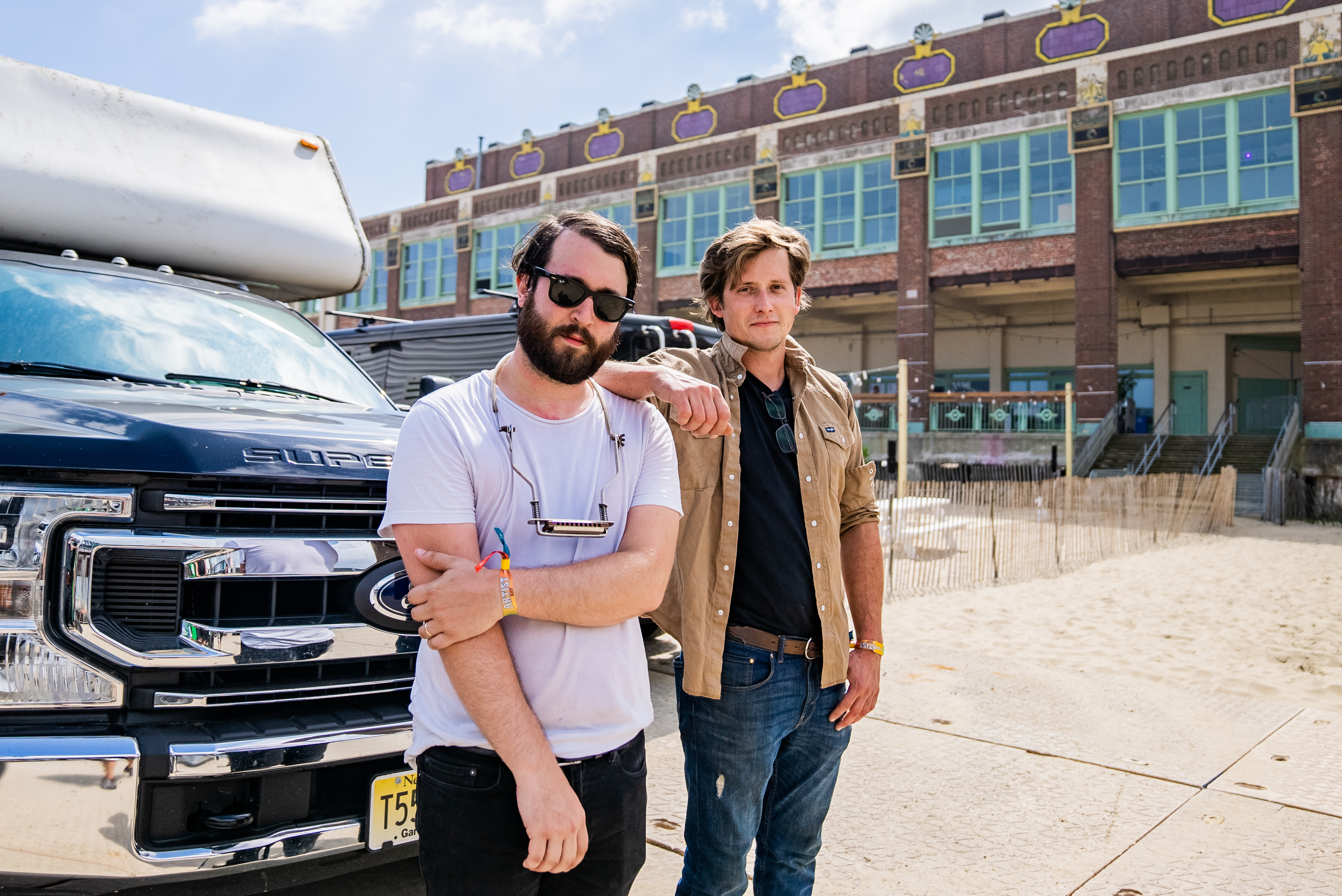

Background information
- Origin: Jackson, New Jersey, U.S.
- Genres: indie folk, Americana, Alt-Country, American Folk
- Years active: 2016–present.
- Members: Joe Makoviecki; James Black; Cranston Dean; Max Carmichael; James Herdman
- Website: www.jacksonpines.com

Jackson Pines is an American folk rock band from New Jersey.

== History ==
Jackson Pines is an indie folk duo from Jackson, New Jersey, consisting of Joe Makoviecki and James Black. Both members previously played together in the group Thomas Wesley Stern. Their debut LP, entitled Purgatory Road, contains 10 original songs recorded in a barn by Simone Felice (The Felice Brothers, The Lumineers) in Palenville, New York. A review from Speak Into My Good Eye calls the EP a "beautiful collection of songs [that] establishes Jackson Pines' warm, natural aesthetic with Makoviecki's voice echoing and honoring the great songwriters. The title track tells the story of a woman pregnant with her first child, and a preacher scared the world is going to end, with Makoviecki explaining in The Aquarian Weekly that "I don't write any songs that don't have at least one foot in my real experience." Billboard called their Lost & Found (EP) a "mash-up of James Taylor and Tom Petty -- with serious focus on acoustic guitar."

The Gas Stations Blues & Diamond Rings (EP) was released in 2019, and Bob Makin in New Jersey Stage says the duo "prove themselves to be one of New Jersey's best examples of those kinds of sounds and stories [of] American roots music." That year, they were featured on the PBS program State of the Arts. It followed Joe and James from Jackson to Asbury Park.

In 2020, Jackson Pines released Half Light as a bedroom recording for the Co-Mission Compilation, which raised money for out of work touring musicians during the early pandemic. They played a live virtual set in Jackson, NJ for the 59th Philadelphia Folk Festival.

In 2021, Jackson Pines recorded their second full-length record. It was produced by Ro Karunaratne and features him and Santo Rizzolo as the backing band. It spawned the singles Anna Lee, Cry All The Time, and Never Gonna Bury Me. It came out Summer 2021 and was premiered at the Sea Hear Now Festival in September, where they opened for Dr. Dog and Ani DiFranco one of the main stages.

In 2022, Jackson Pines toured "Close To Home" and began working on the Ridgway family repertoire and other folk material that would become "Pine Barrens Volume One". In December, the new backing band of Cranston Dean and Max Carmichael would join them, along with James Herdman, to record Pine Barrens Volume One.

On January 1, 2023, Mt. Holly Jail, a 19th-century Pine Barrens folk song, was released ahead of "Pine Barrens Volume One". On February 27, the whole record came out and was released on vinyl and CD, as well as digitally and on streaming. The band toured the region preserving and highlighting the connection between their music and the folk music from their home, playing at Steelstacks, WXPN, and headlining the New Jersey Folk Festival at Rutgers University.

Jackson Pines then appeared on various podcasts, including New Jersey Is The World and American Songcatcher; NPR stations such as Prairie Public Radio, KBCS, and WXPN and were featured on their own episode of PBS's "Here's The Story", highlighting their music and special connection to Albert Music Hall, the "Opry of the East".

"Pine Barrens Volume One" was named 2023 Album of the Year by The Aquarian Weekly.

== Members ==
- James Black (stand up bass, banjo)
- Joe Makoviecki (vocals, guitar, harmonica)

Backing musicians:

- Cranston Dean (drums, vocals, mandolin)
- James Herdman (fiddle)
- Max Carmichael (octave mandolin, banjo, flute, guitar)
- Santo Rizzolo (drums)
- Roshane Karunaratne (keyboard instruments, guitar)

== Discography ==
Albums

- Purgatory Road (2017)
- Close To Home (2021)
- Pine Barrens Volume One (2023)
- Pine Barrens Volume Two (2024)

EPs

- NY-23A (2016) [now lost]
- Lost & Found (2017)
- Gas Stations Blues & Diamond Rings (2019)

Singles

- Even When I'm Gone (2017)
- Lost & Found (2017)
- Thinking About It (2019)
- Half Light (2020)
- Anna Lee (2021)
- Cry All The Time (2021)
- Never Gonna Bury Me (2021)
- Mt. Holly Jail (2023)
- The Unquiet Grave (Child Ballad No. 78) (2023)
- Wheel (2023)
- Hammer (2023)
- Control Burn (2024)
- Julie Jane (2024)
