= Toy Cars =

American rock group

- Origin: Asbury Park, New Jersey, U.S.
- Genres: Indie rock, rock
- Years active: 2014–2020
- Labels: Sniffling Indie Kids, Counter Intuitive Records
- Members: Chris Beninato; Matt Caponegro; Matteo DeBenedetti; Mike Linardi

Toy Cars was an American rock band from Asbury Park, New Jersey.

== History ==
Toy Cars was a four-piece indie punk rock band from Asbury Park, New Jersey, that formed in 2014. Prior to Toy Cars, Chris Beninato and Matteo DeBenedetti played in the band Monterey, Caponegro played in Hodera, and Linardi played in Deal Casino. Their music is described as "middle ground between the New Brunswick basement dwelling punk rock they were born out of and emotionally exposed folk music," and they draw comparison to the music of Kevin Devine, early Brand New, Desaparecidos and Against Me!. Their first release was the song "Luck," which is described as "raspy, pop-punk eschewing vocals and understated, troubadour strumming," on 11 September 2014, followed the four-track EP Red Hands, on 28 September 2014. Toy Cars second EP, entitled Letters, was released on 11 August 2015.

Their third EP, entitled Sleeping Patterns, was released in September 2016 with Counter Intuitive Records and Sniffling Indie Kids. Toy Cars performed at the 2016 North Jersey Indie Rock Festival, and shortly after, with the Menzingers at Crosswoods in Garwood, New Jersey. Their debut album, the twelve-track Paint Brain, was self-released on 12 January 2018. A review by The Spill Magazine says that "Toy Cars brings the youthful exuberance of independence," adding the album "ventur[es] into the realms of spacious Americana-influenced indie [with] willingness to shed comparison to early-2000s-inspired New Jersey emo." The songs "Iron Me Out" and "Erie" were featured in the January 2018 editions of Alternative Press' Songs You Need to Hear.

== Members ==
- Chris Beninato – bass
- Matt Caponegro – guitar and vocals
- Matteo DeBenedetti – vocals and guitar
- Mike Linardi – drums and vocals

== Discography ==
Albums

- Paint Brain (2018)

EPs

- Red Hands (2014)
- Letters (2015)
- Sleeping Patterns (2016)
- EP 4 (2019)

Singles

- "Luck" (2014)
- "Trimming the Family Tree" (2015)
- "Remission" (2018)
- "Julian" (2019)
