= The Deli =

Independent music magazine

- Editor: Paolo De Gregorio
- Categories: Music magazine
- Frequency: Quarterly
- Publisher: Paolo De Gregorio
- Founder: Charles Newman
- Founded: 2000
- Company: Independent/DIY
- Country: United States
- Based in: New York, New York
- Language: English
- Website: thedelimagazine.com

The Deli was a Brooklyn-based independent music magazine, with both print and online editions, as well as a blog (still active) that covers local music scenes and their emerging artists.

== Magazine ==
In its print version, The Deli was a quarterly publication launched in 2004 by Paolo De Gregorio as an overhaul of an earlier, local fanzine founded by Charles Newman, a music producer and studio owner in New York City. It was published in print until 2019 and survives online to this day as a blog. Its main focus is emerging independent artists in various locales and scenes: New York, Los Angeles, Chicago - it previously covered also San Francisco, Nashville, Portland, Austin, Kansas City, Philadelphia and the New England area.

Its editions have further versions tailored to specific locales, yet otherwise have similar sections: editorials on the current music scene, interviews of music bands and of industry insiders, reviews of albums and of equipment, and classified ads. (In 2011, the magazine's gear reviews ceased syndication, by limited partnership, from the music-production website SonicScoop, and began occurring through The Deli technology blog Delicious Audio.)

== Activities ==
Since 2005, The Deli website has included blogs, polls, charts, and live listings updated daily. (On its website, The Deli used to code music genres with respective icons: a hamburger for rock, a hash brownie for psychedelic, a fish for electronic, and a soup can for ambient, etc.) The Deli also hosted live music events, mainly The Deli's Best of NYC Fest, which, occurring in the spring, is preceded by the magazine's Best of NYC Yearly Poll, whose jury is comprised by New York booking agents, bloggers and scenemakers.
