= Badlands: A Tribute to Bruce Springsteen's Nebraska =

2000 compilation album by various artists

Compilation album by Various artists
- Released: November 7, 2000
- Genre: Rock, folk
- Length: 55:27
- Label: Sub Pop
- Producer: Jim Sampas

Professional ratings
Review scores
Source	Rating
Allmusic	3/5 stars

Badlands: A Tribute to Bruce Springsteen's Nebraska is a tribute album containing songs by artists inspired and influenced by Bruce Springsteen's 1982 album, Nebraska. It was released by Sub Pop Records in November 2000.

A portion of the worldwide sales of this record were donated to the Nobel Prize-winning organization Médecins Sans Frontières.

The album received a favorable review from PopMatters, which wrote that it "succeeds because the original work was so strong. The people in these songs live. They walk our streets, put gas in our car, and cry alone at night. The artists that allow the voices of the characters to dominate the song, instead of overshadowing with their own persona, come out the best." AllMusic said "This is more successful than most tribute albums ... though like virtually all tribute albums, it's uneven."

== Track listing ==
All tracks are written by Bruce Springsteen

No.	Title	Performed by	Length
1.	"Nebraska"	Chrissie Hynde and Adam Seymour	4:20
2.	"Atlantic City"	Hank Williams III	4:41
3.	"Mansion on the Hill"	Crooked Fingers	4:39
4.	"Johnny 99"	Los Lobos	3:46
5.	"Highway Patrolman"	Dar Williams	6:12
6.	"State Trooper"	Deana Carter	3:46
7.	"Used Cars"	Ani DiFranco	3:25
8.	"Open All Night"	Son Volt	3:46
9.	"My Father's House"	Ben Harper	4:48
10.	"Reason to Believe"	Aimee Mann and Michael Penn	4:12
11.	"I'm on Fire"	Johnny Cash	3:05
12.	"Downbound Train"	Raul Malo	3:40
13.	"Wages of Sin"	Damien Jurado and Rose Thomas	5:06
