= Electric Nebraska =

Studio album by Bruce Springsteen
- Released: October 24, 2025 (as part of Nebraska '82: Expanded Edition)
- Recorded: January 3, 1982, to May 1982 in Colts Neck, New Jersey, Power Station Studios, and The Hit Factory in New York
- Genre: Rock; heartland rock
- Label: Columbia
- Producer: Bruce Springsteen

Bruce Springsteen chronology
Nebraska (1982)	Electric Nebraska (2025)	Born in the U.S.A. (1984)

Bruce Springsteen and the E Street Band chronology
The River (1980)	Electric Nebraska (2025)	Born in the U.S.A. (1984)

Electric Nebraska is the name commonly given to the Bruce Springsteen and the E Street Band recordings of the tracks that would eventually comprise the Nebraska album and to some extent the Born in the U.S.A. album, as well as a few compilation albums. The original intent with the album was to record and release the tracks in a traditional rock arrangement with the E Street Band. However, due to the personal, somber, and folksy nature of the demos Springsteen had already recorded and felt the band could not recreate, Springsteen decided to scrap the full band album and release the tracks as they were, without the rock arrangements. Besides the future Nebraska tracks, the sessions also spawned eight tracks that would eventually find their way to the follow-up album Born in the U.S.A. as well as a few released tracks not included on that album and a few that were left unreleased.

The Electric Nebraska sessions are included in the reissue of Nebraska, entitled Nebraska '82: Expanded Edition, which was released on October 24, 2025.

== History ==
Bruce Springsteen recorded the demos for the album on a 4-track cassette recorder at his home in a time frame of 1981-1982. Unlike the later Electric Nebraska recordings, the demos were sparse, using only acoustic guitar, electric guitar (on "Open All Night"), harmonica, mandolin, glockenspiel, tambourine, organ, synthesizer (on "My Father's House") and Springsteen's voice. The songs also have sparse composition, and many are simple three-chord songs.

Following the completion of the demos, Springsteen brought the demos down to the studio with the intention of turning them into proper E Street Band recordings, commonly referred to as Electric Nebraska to differentiate them from the demos, however, Springsteen and Jon Landau felt the E Street Band recordings could not duplicate the raw, deeply personal, and haunting folk essence of the home tapes. While the Electric Nebraska album was scrapped, eight tracks would later find their way to the Born in the U.S.A. album, released in 1984, a few as stand-alone singles, and a few remaining unreleased in any form to this day. Tracks from these sessions that were included on Born in the U.S.A. include: "Born in the U.S.A.", which was completed on May 3, 1982; "Downbound Train", recorded April 28, 1982; "Cover Me", recorded at the Hit Factory, New York on January 25, 1982; "I'm on Fire", recorded at the Power Station on May 11, 1982; "Glory Days", recorded at the Power Station on May 5, 1982; "Darlington County", recorded at the Power Station on May 13, 1982; "Working on the Highway", recorded April 30 and May 6, 1982, and "I'm Going Down", recorded on May 12 or 13, 1982.

Fifteen tracks were recorded on January 3, 1982. These were: "Starkweather" ("Nebraska"), "Atlantic City", "Mansion on the Hill", "Johnny 99", "Highway Patrolman", "State Trooper", "Used Cars", "Wanda" ("Open All Night"), "Reason to Believe", "Born in the U.S.A.", "Downbound Train", "Child Bride", "Losin' Kind", "My Father's House" (May 25, 1982), and "Pink Cadillac", a total of 15 songs; 10 of these tracks would make the Nebraska album while the "Born in the U.S.A." demo would later appear on the Tracks compilation album. The remaining four demos have circulated amongst Springsteen fans with two of these, "Downbound Train" (Born in the U.S.A.) and "Pink Cadillac" (Tracks) being officially released in a band format leaving "Child Bride" and "Losin' Kind" as unreleased outside of their demo versions. There was also another demo, "The Big Payback" recorded later in spring 1982, and "Johnny Bye-Bye", which Springsteen confused with a live version recorded July 1981, that was actually never recorded during this period, that brings the total to the often-cited 17.

== Release ==
Due to the realization that the folk recordings of Nebraska worked better than the band recordings, Electric Nebraska (and its briefly floated double-album plan featuring both the folk and electric recordings) was shelved. Springsteen fans speculated on whether the album would eventually be released, but most of the tracks, save for nine that remain unreleased, have been released either on the Nebraska album, Born in the U.S.A. album, or as a stand-alone single or part of a compilation album. In a 2006 interview, Jon Landau said that Electric Nebraska's release was unlikely stating that "the right version of Nebraska came out".

Over the years, members of the E Street Band confirmed the album exists; however, their memories of the recordings differ from each other. In a 2010 interview, Max Weinberg discussed the album by saying, "The E Street Band actually did record all of Nebraska and it was killing. It was all very hard-edged. As great as it was, it wasn't what Bruce wanted to release. There is a full band Nebraska album, all of those songs are in the can somewhere." Roy Bittan was asked in 2015 about recording the album and how many songs existed. "I don't know offhand. My vague memory tells me it was maybe a majority of the songs? I think we actually rehearsed those songs in the living room of my house. I had a really high-ceilinged living room with lots of glass and wood, and it actually sounded great in there. I think we cut...not cut, I think we rehearsed quite a number of those songs. I don't have a good handle on what was maybe written later." Bittan was informed by the interviewer how many fans would love to hear it, to which Bittan replied, "I'd like to hear it, too. There may be a tape around somewhere. I'm not sure."

In June 2025, Springsteen gave a lengthy interview to promote his upcoming box set Tracks II: The Lost Albums (a full 18-song album recorded by Springsteen in between Nebraska and Born in the U.S.A. and titled LA Garage Sessions '83 is part of the box set). He denied the existence of Electric Nebraska. "I can tell you right now, it doesn't exist. We tried to do a few songs with the band for a few minor electric versions of Nebraska, maybe something else, I'm not sure. But that record simply doesn't exist. There is no electric Nebraska outside of what you hear us performing on stage." He was further pressed by the interviewer, who mentioned that both Weinberg and Bittan confirmed it existed. "I have no recollection of it, but I can tell you there's nothing in our vault that would amount to an electric Nebraska", Springsteen said. A month following the interview, Springsteen texted the interviewer to confirm that he was actually wrong. "Just wanted to give you a heads up. I checked our vault and there IS an electric Nebraska record, though it does not have the full album of songs."

On October 24, 2025, the recordings were released as part of the box set Nebraska '82: Expanded Edition. The set includes the original album remastered, the previously unreleased Electric Nebraska recordings, and a new performance film.

== Track listing ==
=== Electric Nebraska (CD/LP 2) ===
1. "Nebraska"
2. "Atlantic City"
3. "Mansion on the Hill"
4. "Johnny 99"
5. "Downbound Train"
6. "Open All Night"
7. "Born in the U.S.A."
8. "Reason to Believe"

== Personnel ==
- Bruce Springsteen – vocals, electric guitar, harmonica
- Roy Bittan – piano
- Clarence Clemons – saxophone
- Danny Federici – organ, synthesizer
- Garry Tallent – bass guitar
- Steven Van Zandt – acoustic and electric guitar
- Max Weinberg – drums

The sessions were produced by Springsteen, Van Zandt, and Jon Landau, and engineered by Toby Scott with assistant engineers Zoe Yanakis and Jeff Hendrickson, mixing engineer Rob Lebret, and mastering engineers Bob Jackson and Brian Lee.
