= Brendan Byrne Arena, New Jersey 1984 =

Live album by Bruce Springsteen & the E Street Band
- Released: May 13, 2015
- Recorded: August 5, 1984
- Genre: Rock
- Length: 3:15:46
- Label: https://live.brucespringsteen.net
- Producer: Toby Scott, David Bianco, Jim Scott

Bruce Springsteen & the E Street Band chronology
| Nassau Coliseum, New York 1980 (2015) | Brendan Byrne Arena, New Jersey 1984 (2015) | LA Sports Arena, California 1988 (2015) |

Brendan Byrne Arena, New Jersey 1984 is a live album by Bruce Springsteen & the E Street Band, released in May 2015 and was the fifth official release through the Bruce Springsteen Archives. The show was originally recorded live at the Brendan Byrne Arena in East Rutherford, New Jersey on August 5, 1984.

== Background ==
The release is the first officially released complete recording from Bruce Springsteen's historic Born in the USA Tour. This was the E Street Band's first tour with Nils Lofgren on guitar (Steven Van Zandt had left the band) and Patti Scialfa on vocals and percussion.

== Track listing ==
All songs by Bruce Springsteen, except as noted.

=== Set One ===
1. "Born in the USA" – 5:42
2. "Out in the Street" – 5:19
3. "Tenth Avenue Freeze-Out" – 5:00
4. "Atlantic City" – 5:13
5. "Johnny 99" – 4:30
6. "Highway Patrolman" – 6:25
7. "Prove It All Night" – 6:26
8. "Glory Days" – 10:16
9. "The Promised Land" – 6:28
10. "Used Cars" – 6:16
11. "My Hometown" – 6:01
12. "Badlands" – 5:28
13. "Thunder Road" – 6:47

=== Set Two ===
1. "Hungry Heart" – 5:07
2. "Dancing in the Dark" – 5:47
3. "Cadillac Ranch" – 5:14
4. "Sherry Darling" – 5:55
5. "No Surrender" – 5:35
6. "Pink Cadillac" – 6:53
7. "Growin' Up" – 8:56
8. "Bobby Jean" – 4:10
9. "Backstreets – 10:30
10. "Rosalita (Come Out Tonight)" – 17:05

=== First Encore ===
1. "Jersey Girl" – 5:37 (Tom Waits)
2. "Jungleland" – 12:38

=== Second Encore ===
1. "Born to Run" – 4:43
2. "Detroit Medley" – 4:05
  - "Devil With a Blue Dress On" (Stevenson/Long)
  - "See See Rider" (Rainey/Lena Arant)
  - "Good Golly Miss Molly" (Blackwell/Marascalco)
  - "Jenny Take a Ride" (Crewe/Johnson/Penniman)
3. "Travelin' Band" – 5:03 (John Fogerty)
4. "Twist and Shout" – 8:41 (Phil Medley, Bert Berns)

== Personnel ==
- Bruce Springsteen – lead vocals, guitars, harmonica
- Clarence Clemons – saxophone, congas, percussion, background vocals
- Garry Tallent – bass guitar
- Danny Federici – organ, glockenspiel, piano, synthesizer
- Roy Bittan – piano, synthesizer, background vocals
- Max Weinberg – drums
- Nils Lofgren – guitars, background vocals
- Patti Scialfa – background vocals, synthesizer, tambourine
