= Born in the U.S.A. Tour =

1984–85 concert tour by Bruce Springsteen

- Tour by Bruce Springsteen and the E Street Band
- Promotional poster for the show of June 15, 1985 in Frankfurt
- Associated album: Born in the U.S.A.
- Start date: June 29, 1984
- End date: October 2, 1985
- Legs: 4
- No. of shows: 122 in North America; 8 in Australia; 8 in Asia; 18 in Europe; 156 in total

Bruce Springsteen and the E Street Band concert chronology
- The River Tour (1980–81); Born in the U.S.A. Tour (1984–85); Tunnel of Love Express Tour (1988)

The Born in the U.S.A. Tour was the supporting concert tour of Bruce Springsteen's Born in the U.S.A. album. It was his longest and most successful tour to date. It featured a physically transformed Springsteen; after two years of bodybuilding, the singer had bulked up considerably. The tour was the first since the 1974 portions of the Born to Run tours without guitarist Steven Van Zandt, who decided to go solo after recording the album with the group. Van Zandt, who was replaced by Nils Lofgren, would appear a few times throughout the tour and in some of the music videos to promote the album. It was also the first tour to feature Springsteen's future wife, Patti Scialfa.

The tour started in June 1984 and went through the United States and to Canada. In March 1985 the tour went to Australia, Japan and Europe. It then headed back for a second leg of the U.S. tour in which Springsteen and the E Street Band played to sold-out professional football stadiums. The tour finished in October 1985 in Los Angeles.

Springsteen had consistently pushed for improvements to the usual concert sound systems during his tours, wishing to provide the best experience for every audience member, and by the time of the Born in the U.S.A. Tour, the resulting eight rows of delay speakers suggested by Bruce Jackson, his live sound engineer during this period, brought greater audio fidelity to even the furthest "nosebleed" seats. This new development set a higher standard for concert sound, but it was more expensive to implement, and it became a factor in driving up the cost of concert tickets for artists who sought the same sound quality that Springsteen had demonstrated.

The tour grossed $80–90 million overall. Of that, $34 million came from Springsteen's summer 1985 stadium dates in North America. The Born in the U.S.A. album was inside the top 10 of the Billboard 200 during the entire tour. Springsteen also was enjoying a hit single from the album (there were seven in total) during any moment of the tour. The album along with Springsteen's previous album, Nebraska, which he did not tour to promote, were performed in their entirety throughout the tour. Total attendance was 3.9 million.

== Tour highlights ==
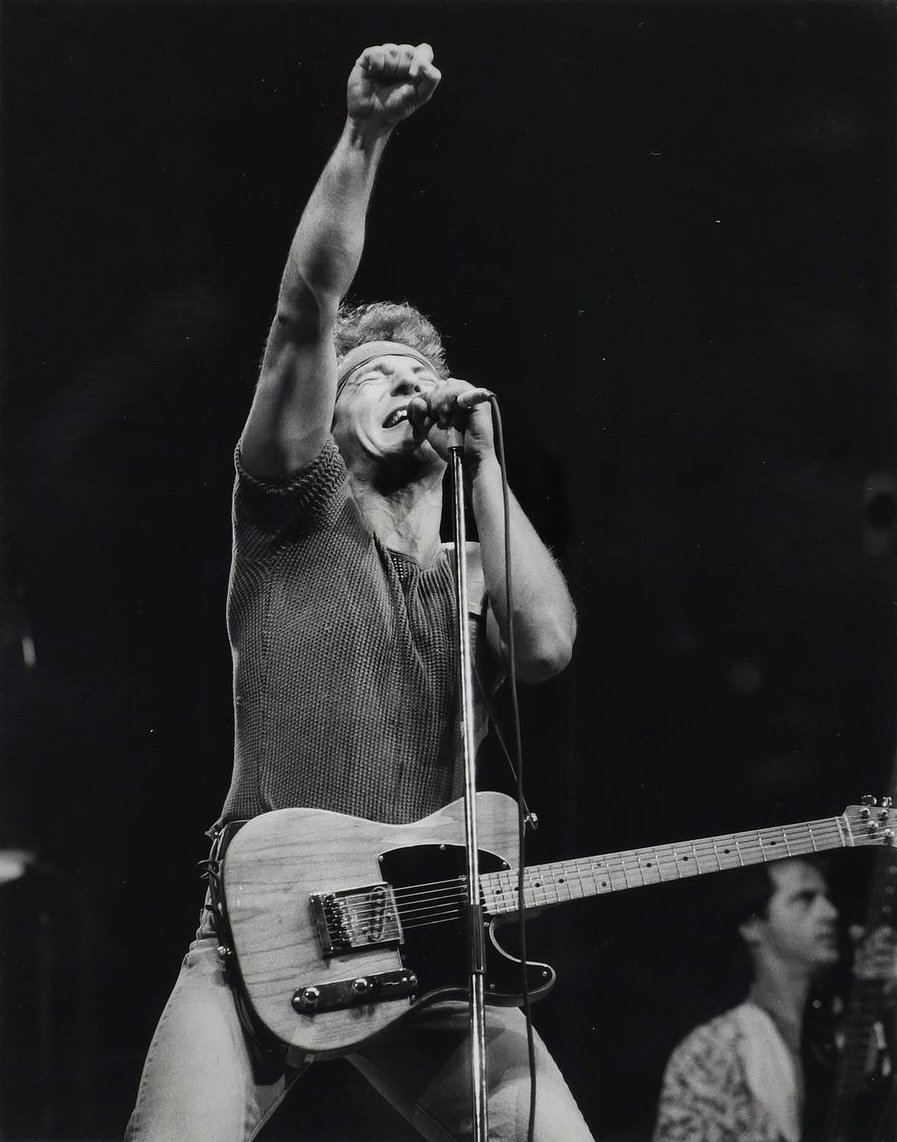
Springsteen performing at the tour in 1985.

- June 29, Saint Paul, Minnesota–First show of the tour, including the filming of the iconic "Dancing in the Dark" music video. Patti Scialfa and Nils Lofgren make their E Street Band debuts.
- July 12, East Troy, Wisconsin–A Born in the U.S.A. outtake called "Man at the Top" was played live for the first time. It would be officially released 14 years later, on the Tracks album, in a different arrangement.
- August 5, East Rutherford, New Jersey–Springsteen played the first show of a ten-night stand at the Brendan Byrne Arena.
- August 6, East Rutherford, New Jersey–The versions of "Nebraska" and "No Surrender" played here appeared on Live/1975-85.
- August 19, East Rutherford, New Jersey–"Reason to Believe" appeared on Live/1975-85.
- August 20, East Rutherford, New Jersey–"Tenth Avenue Freeze-Out", with the Miami Horns, appeared on Live/1975-85. Steve Van Zandt also made his first appearance with Springsteen since leaving the E Street Band, playing on the song "Two Hearts" and a cover of "Drift Away".
- August 25–29, Landover, Maryland–Springsteen played four shows over six nights here. "Be True" made its first live appearance on August 26. George Will attended one of these shows, inspiring him to write a column extolling Springsteen as an exemplar of patriotic values.
- September 14, Philadelphia–Springsteen played the first show of a six-night stand at the Spectrum.
- October 15, Vancouver, British Columbia–The show had to be stopped temporarily when unruly fans rushed the stage.
- October 19, Tacoma, Washington–For the first time since 1974, the Springsteen classic "Rosalita" was not played. It would be played infrequently on the rest of the tour.
- October 25, Los Angeles–First of seven concerts at the Los Angeles Memorial Sports Arena.
- November 16, Ames, Iowa–The Born in the U.S.A. outtake, "Sugarland", made its debut. Its only other appearance on the tour (and in concert overall) came two nights later in Lincoln, Nebraska.
- December 6, Birmingham, Alabama–The Birmingham, Alabama show at the BJCC Coliseum is notable for being the only show of the entire Born in the U.S.A. tour to not sell out.
- December 14, Memphis, Tennessee–Steve Van Zandt once again played on "Two Hearts".
- January 18, Greensboro, North Carolina–Gary U.S. Bonds and Robbin Thompson made an appearance on "Twist and Shout".
- January 26, Syracuse, New York–Springsteen played his first true stadium show at the Carrier Dome, in the final U.S. show until August.
- March 21, Sydney, Australia–Springsteen played the first of eight Australian concerts.
- March 31, Brisbane, Australia–Springsteen played his first outdoor stadium show at QE2 Stadium.
- April 10, Tokyo, Japan–The first of eight Japanese shows, the only time Springsteen and the E Street Band have fronted a tour in Japan.
- June 1, Slane Castle, Ireland–The first European show of the tour included the one and only time Springsteen has covered "When I Grow Up (To Be a Man)" by the Beach Boys.
- July 4, Wembley Stadium, London– Springsteen starts with a solo performance of "Independence Day".
- August 5, Washington, D.C.–Springsteen began his first stadium tour at Robert F. Kennedy Memorial Stadium "Man at the Top" was played for the second and final time on the tour after premiering one month and one year earlier at the Alpine Valley Music Theatre, before it reappeared nearly 30 years later on the closing night of the European leg of the Wrecking Ball World Tour in 2013.
- August 11, Pittsburgh, Pennsylvania–The show at Three Rivers Stadium was seen by 65,935 fans, the largest concert in Pittsburgh history.
- August 18, East Rutherford, New Jersey–Springsteen played his first concert at Giants Stadium, a venue he would visit many more times throughout his career, and which would eventually become the subject of his song "Wrecking Ball" 25 years later. This show was the first of six at the stadium on this tour.
- August 19, East Rutherford, New Jersey–The performances of "Working on the Highway", "Born to Run", "Johnny 99", and "I'm on Fire" all appeared on Live/1975-85.
- August 21, East Rutherford, New Jersey–The performances of "Bobby Jean" appeared on Live/1975-85.
- September 27, Los Angeles–A four-night stand at the Los Angeles Memorial Coliseum began. "Janey, Don't You Lose Heart" and "War" were played for the first time, with the performance of "War" being included in the Live/1975-85 set and released as a single in 1986.
- September 30, Los Angeles–The performances of "Born in the U.S.A.", "Seeds", "The River, "Darlington County", "The Promised Land", "Cover Me", and "My Hometown" all appeared on Live/1975-85.
- October 2, Los Angeles–Final show of the tour.

== Broadcasts and recordings ==
Nearly half of Live/1975-85 consists of songs from the Born in the U.S.A. Tour, incorporating songs from the August 6, August 19, and August 20 shows in 1984, and the August 19, August 21, and September 30 shows in 1985.

Several shows have been released as part of the Bruce Springsteen Archives:

- Brendan Byrne Arena, New Jersey 1984 released on May 13, 2015
- Brendan Byrne Arena, August 20, 1984 released on March 2, 2018
- Los Angeles Memorial Coliseum, Sept 27, 1985 released on April 5, 2019
- Brendan Byrne Arena, August 6, 1984 released on September 18, 2020
- Giants Stadium, August 22, 1985 released on July 23, 2021
- Brendan Byrne Arena, August 19, 1984 released on August 5, 2022

== Tour dates ==
Date	City	Country	Venue	Attendance	Revenue
North America
June 29, 1984	Saint Paul	United States	St. Paul Civic Center	—N/a	—N/a
July 1, 1984	Saint Paul	United States	St. Paul Civic Center	—N/a	—N/a
July 2, 1984	Saint Paul	United States	St. Paul Civic Center	—N/a	—N/a
July 5, 1984	Cincinnati	United States	Riverfront Coliseum	—N/a	—N/a
July 6, 1984	Cincinnati	United States	Riverfront Coliseum	—N/a	—N/a
July 8, 1984	Richfield	United States	Richfield Coliseum	37,512 / 37,512	$562,680
July 9, 1984	Richfield	United States	Richfield Coliseum	37,512 / 37,512	$562,680
July 12, 1984	East Troy	United States	Alpine Valley Music Theatre	—N/a	—N/a
July 13, 1984	East Troy	United States	Alpine Valley Music Theatre	—N/a	—N/a
July 15, 1984	Rosemont	United States	Rosemont Horizon	54,550 / 54,550	$779,325
July 17, 1984	Rosemont	United States	Rosemont Horizon	54,550 / 54,550	$779,325
July 18, 1984	Rosemont	United States	Rosemont Horizon	54,550 / 54,550	$779,325
July 21, 1984	Montreal	Canada	Montreal Forum	—N/a	—N/a
July 23, 1984	Toronto	Canada	CNE Stadium	68,187 / 68,187	$1,279,420
July 24, 1984	Toronto	Canada	CNE Stadium	68,187 / 68,187	$1,279,420
July 26, 1984	Toronto	Canada	CNE Stadium	68,187 / 68,187	$1,279,420
July 27, 1984	Saratoga Springs	United States	Saratoga Performing Arts Center	30,000 / 30,000	—N/a
July 30, 1984	Detroit	United States	Joe Louis Arena	39,430 / 39,430	—N/a
July 31, 1984	Detroit	United States	Joe Louis Arena	39,430 / 39,430	—N/a
August 5, 1984	East Rutherford	United States	Brendan Byrne Arena	210,840 / 210,840	$3,373,440
August 6, 1984	East Rutherford	United States	Brendan Byrne Arena	210,840 / 210,840	$3,373,440
August 8, 1984	East Rutherford	United States	Brendan Byrne Arena	210,840 / 210,840	$3,373,440
August 9, 1984	East Rutherford	United States	Brendan Byrne Arena	210,840 / 210,840	$3,373,440
August 11, 1984	East Rutherford	United States	Brendan Byrne Arena	210,840 / 210,840	$3,373,440
August 12, 1984	East Rutherford	United States	Brendan Byrne Arena	210,840 / 210,840	$3,373,440
August 16, 1984	East Rutherford	United States	Brendan Byrne Arena	210,840 / 210,840	$3,373,440
August 17, 1984	East Rutherford	United States	Brendan Byrne Arena	210,840 / 210,840	$3,373,440
August 19, 1984	East Rutherford	United States	Brendan Byrne Arena	210,840 / 210,840	$3,373,440
August 20, 1984	East Rutherford	United States	Brendan Byrne Arena	210,840 / 210,840	$3,373,440
August 25, 1984	Landover	United States	Capital Centre	76,608 / 76,608	$1,158,752
August 26, 1984	Landover	United States	Capital Centre	76,608 / 76,608	$1,158,752
August 28, 1984	Landover	United States	Capital Centre	76,608 / 76,608	$1,158,752
August 29, 1984	Landover	United States	Capital Centre	76,608 / 76,608	$1,158,752
September 4, 1984	Worcester	United States	Worcester Centrum	—N/a	—N/a
September 5, 1984	Worcester	United States	Worcester Centrum	—N/a	—N/a
September 7, 1984	Hartford	United States	Hartford Civic Center	32,000 / 32,000	$503,583
September 8, 1984	Hartford	United States	Hartford Civic Center	32,000 / 32,000	$503,583
September 11, 1984	Philadelphia	United States	The Spectrum	109,250 / 109,250	$1,748,000
September 12, 1984	Philadelphia	United States	The Spectrum	109,250 / 109,250	$1,748,000
September 14, 1984	Philadelphia	United States	The Spectrum	109,250 / 109,250	$1,748,000
September 15, 1984	Philadelphia	United States	The Spectrum	109,250 / 109,250	$1,748,000
September 17, 1984	Philadelphia	United States	The Spectrum	109,250 / 109,250	$1,748,000
September 18, 1984	Philadelphia	United States	The Spectrum	109,250 / 109,250	$1,748,000
September 21, 1984	Pittsburgh	United States	Civic Arena	34,517 / 34,517	—N/a
September 22, 1984	Pittsburgh	United States	Civic Arena	34,517 / 34,517	—N/a
September 24, 1984	Buffalo	United States	Buffalo Memorial Auditorium	34,800 / 34,800	$499,045
September 25, 1984	Buffalo	United States	Buffalo Memorial Auditorium	34,800 / 34,800	$499,045
October 15, 1984	Vancouver	Canada	Pacific Coliseum	—N/a	—N/a
October 17, 1984	Tacoma	United States	Tacoma Dome	—N/a	—N/a
October 19, 1984	Tacoma	United States	Tacoma Dome	—N/a	—N/a
October 21, 1984	Oakland	United States	Oakland–Alameda County Coliseum Arena	27,267 / 27,267	$436,272
October 22, 1984	Oakland	United States	Oakland–Alameda County Coliseum Arena	27,267 / 27,267	$436,272
October 25, 1984	Los Angeles	United States	Los Angeles Sports Arena	111,139 / 111,139	$1,694,674
October 26, 1984	Los Angeles	United States	Los Angeles Sports Arena	111,139 / 111,139	$1,694,674
October 28, 1984	Los Angeles	United States	Los Angeles Sports Arena	111,139 / 111,139	$1,694,674
October 29, 1984	Los Angeles	United States	Los Angeles Sports Arena	111,139 / 111,139	$1,694,674
October 31, 1984	Los Angeles	United States	Los Angeles Sports Arena	111,139 / 111,139	$1,694,674
November 2, 1984	Los Angeles	United States	Los Angeles Sports Arena	111,139 / 111,139	$1,694,674
November 4, 1984	Los Angeles	United States	Los Angeles Sports Arena	111,139 / 111,139	$1,694,674
November 8, 1984	Tempe	United States	Arizona State University Activity Center	—N/a	—N/a
November 11, 1984	Denver	United States	McNichols Sports Arena	—N/a	—N/a
November 12, 1984	Denver	United States	McNichols Sports Arena	—N/a	—N/a
November 15, 1984	St. Louis	United States	St. Louis Arena	—N/a	—N/a
November 16, 1984	Ames	United States	Hilton Coliseum	—N/a	—N/a
November 18, 1984	Lincoln	United States	Bob Devaney Sports Center	13,910 / 13,910	$219,744
November 19, 1984	Kansas City	United States	Kemper Arena	17,672 / 17,672	$280,150
November 23, 1984	Austin	United States	Frank Erwin Center	17,959 / 17,959	$271,603
November 25, 1984	Dallas	United States	Reunion Arena	37,516 / 37,516	$647,482
November 26, 1984	Dallas	United States	Reunion Arena	37,516 / 37,516	$647,482
November 29, 1984	Houston	United States	The Summit	33,392 / 33,392	$580,744
November 30, 1984	Houston	United States	The Summit	33,392 / 33,392	$580,744
December 2, 1984	Baton Rouge	United States	LSU Assembly Center	14,715 / 14,715	$241,305
December 6, 1984	Birmingham	United States	Birmingham-Jefferson Convention Center	—N/a	—N/a
December 7, 1984	Tallahassee	United States	Leon County Civic Center	12,970 / 12,970	$207,520
December 9, 1984	Murfreesboro	United States	Murphy Center	—N/a	—N/a
December 11, 1984	Lexington	United States	Rupp Arena	23,292 / 23,292	$369,632
December 13, 1984	Memphis	United States	Mid-South Coliseum	23,257 / 23,257	$364,516
December 14, 1984	Memphis	United States	Mid-South Coliseum	23,257 / 23,257	$364,516
December 16, 1984	Atlanta	United States	The Omni	34,170 / 34,170	$525,408
December 17, 1984	Atlanta	United States	The Omni	34,170 / 34,170	$525,408
January 4, 1985	Hampton	United States	Hampton Coliseum	—N/a	—N/a
January 5, 1985	Hampton	United States	Hampton Coliseum	—N/a	—N/a
January 7, 1985	Indianapolis	United States	Market Square Arena	35,396 / 35,396	$601,732
January 8, 1985	Indianapolis	United States	Market Square Arena	35,396 / 35,396	$601,732
January 10, 1985	Louisville	United States	Freedom Hall		
January 13, 1985	Columbia	United States	Carolina Coliseum	12,389 / 12,389	$206,142
January 15, 1985	Charlotte	United States	Charlotte Coliseum	11,439 / 11,439	$381,735
January 16, 1985	Charlotte	United States	Charlotte Coliseum	11,439 / 11,439	$381,735
January 18, 1985	Greensboro	United States	Greensboro Coliseum	—N/a	—N/a
January 19, 1985	Greensboro	United States	Greensboro Coliseum	—N/a	—N/a
January 23, 1985	Providence	United States	Providence Civic Center	26,848 / 26,848	$443,037
January 24, 1985	Providence	United States	Providence Civic Center	26,848 / 26,848	$443,037
January 26, 1985	Syracuse	United States	Carrier Dome	72,000 / 72,000	—N/a
January 27, 1985	Syracuse	United States	Carrier Dome	72,000 / 72,000	—N/a
Asia/Australia
March 21, 1985	Sydney	Australia	Sydney Entertainment Centre	50,000	—N/a
March 23, 1985	Sydney	Australia	Sydney Entertainment Centre	50,000	—N/a
March 24, 1985	Sydney	Australia	Sydney Entertainment Centre	50,000	—N/a
March 27, 1985	Sydney	Australia	Sydney Entertainment Centre	50,000	—N/a
March 28, 1985	Sydney	Australia	Sydney Entertainment Centre	50,000	—N/a
March 31, 1985	Brisbane	Australia	Queen Elizabeth II Stadium	45,000	—N/a
April 3, 1985	Melbourne	Australia	Royal Melbourne Showgrounds	50,000	—N/a
April 4, 1985	Melbourne	Australia	Royal Melbourne Showgrounds	50,000	—N/a
April 10, 1985	Tokyo	Japan	Yoyogi National Gymnasium	25,000	—N/a
April 11, 1985	Tokyo	Japan	Yoyogi National Gymnasium	25,000	—N/a
April 13, 1985	Tokyo	Japan	Yoyogi National Gymnasium	25,000	—N/a
April 15, 1985	Tokyo	Japan	Yoyogi National Gymnasium	25,000	—N/a
April 16, 1985	Tokyo	Japan	Yoyogi National Gymnasium	25,000	—N/a
April 19, 1985	Kyoto	Japan	Kyoto Furitsu Taiikukan	5,000	—N/a
April 22, 1985	Osaka	Japan	Osaka-jo Hall	10,000	—N/a
April 23, 1985	Osaka	Japan	Osaka-jo Hall	10,000	—N/a
Europe
June 1, 1985^{[A]}	Slane	Ireland	Slane Castle	—N/a	—N/a
June 4, 1985	Newcastle	England	St. James' Park	—N/a	—N/a
June 5, 1985	Newcastle	England	St. James' Park	—N/a	—N/a
June 8, 1985	Gothenburg	Sweden	Ullevi Stadium	126,000 / 126,000	—N/a
June 9, 1985	Gothenburg	Sweden	Ullevi Stadium	126,000 / 126,000	—N/a
June 12, 1985	Rotterdam	Netherlands	Feijenoord Stadium	—N/a	—N/a
June 13, 1985	Rotterdam	Netherlands	Feijenoord Stadium	—N/a	—N/a
June 15, 1985	Frankfurt	West Germany	Waldstadion	53 000	—N/a
June 18, 1985	Munich	West Germany	Olympiastadion	37 000	—N/a
June 21, 1985	Milan	Italy	San Siro	65,000	—N/a
June 23, 1985	Montpellier	France	Stade Richter	20 000	—N/a
June 25, 1985	Saint-Étienne	France	Stade Geoffroy-Guichard	25 000	—N/a
June 29, 1985	Paris	France	Parc de La Courneuve	60 000	—N/a
June 30, 1985	Paris	France	Parc de La Courneuve	60 000	—N/a
July 3, 1985	London	England	Wembley Stadium		—N/a
July 4, 1985	London	England	Wembley Stadium		—N/a
July 6, 1985	London	England	Wembley Stadium		—N/a
July 7, 1985	Leeds	England	Roundhay Park		—N/a
North America
August 5, 1985	Washington, D.C.	United States	Robert F. Kennedy Stadium	52,866 / 52,866	$925,155
August 7, 1985	Cleveland	United States	Cleveland Stadium	71,808 / 71,808	$1,256,640
August 9, 1985	Chicago	United States	Soldier Field	71,222 / 71,222	$1,228,500
August 11, 1985	Pittsburgh	United States	Three Rivers Stadium	65,150 / 65,150	$1,140,125
August 14, 1985	Philadelphia	United States	Veterans Stadium	108,000 / 108,000	-
August 15, 1985	Philadelphia	United States	Veterans Stadium	108,000 / 108,000	-
August 18, 1985	East Rutherford	United States	Giants Stadium	396,936 / 396,936	$6,946,380
August 19, 1985	East Rutherford	United States	Giants Stadium	396,936 / 396,936	$6,946,380
August 21, 1985	East Rutherford	United States	Giants Stadium	396,936 / 396,936	$6,946,380
August 22, 1985	East Rutherford	United States	Giants Stadium	396,936 / 396,936	$6,946,380
August 26, 1985	Toronto	Canada	Exhibition Stadium	137,171 / 137,171	$2,771,257
August 27, 1985	Toronto	Canada	Exhibition Stadium	137,171 / 137,171	$2,771,257
August 31, 1985	East Rutherford	United States	Giants Stadium	(Note: The score data is representative of the all shows at the Giants Stadium on August 18–19, 21-22, 31, and September 1 respectively.)	
September 1, 1985	East Rutherford	United States	Giants Stadium	(Note: The score data is representative of the all shows at the Giants Stadium on August 18–19, 21-22, 31, and September 1 respectively.)	
September 4, 1985	Pontiac	United States	Pontiac Silverdome	69,844 / 69,844	$1,222,270
September 6, 1985	Indianapolis	United States	Hoosier Dome	52,127 / 52,127	$899,938
September 9, 1985	Miami	United States	Miami Orange Bowl	146,458 / 146,458	$2,563,015
September 10, 1985	Miami	United States	Miami Orange Bowl	146,458 / 146,458	$2,563,015
September 13, 1985	Dallas	United States	Cotton Bowl	126,707 / 126,707	$2,194,492
September 14, 1985	Dallas	United States	Cotton Bowl	126,707 / 126,707	$2,194,492
September 18, 1985	Oakland	United States	Oakland–Alameda County Coliseum	100,279 / 100,279	$1,754,873
September 19, 1985	Oakland	United States	Oakland–Alameda County Coliseum	100,279 / 100,279	$1,754,873
September 23, 1985	Denver	United States	Mile High Stadium	133,400 / 133,400	$2,347,840
September 24, 1985	Denver	United States	Mile High Stadium	133,400 / 133,400	$2,347,840
September 27, 1985	Los Angeles	United States	Los Angeles Memorial Coliseum	331,892 / 331,892	$5,688,445
September 29, 1985	Los Angeles	United States	Los Angeles Memorial Coliseum	331,892 / 331,892	$5,688,445
September 30, 1985	Los Angeles	United States	Los Angeles Memorial Coliseum	331,892 / 331,892	$5,688,445
October 2, 1985	Los Angeles	United States	Los Angeles Memorial Coliseum	331,892 / 331,892	$5,688,445

Festivals and other miscellaneous performances
^{A} This concert was part of Slane Concert

== Songs performed ==
Originals

Greetings from Asbury Park, N.J.

- "Growin' Up"
- "Spirit in the Night"

The Wild, the Innocent & the E Street Shuffle

- "Rosalita (Come Out Tonight)"

Born to Run

- "Backstreets"
- "Born to Run"
- "Jungleland"
- "Night"
- "Tenth Avenue Freeze-Out"
- "Thunder Road"

Darkness on the Edge of Town

- "Badlands"
- "Candy's Room"
- "Darkness on the Edge of Town"
- "Factory"
- "The Promised Land"
- "Prove It All Night"
- "Racing in the Street"

The River

- "Cadillac Ranch"
- "Hungry Heart"
- "I'm a Rocker"
- "Independence Day"
- "Out in the Street"
- "Point Blank"
- "Ramrod"
- "The River"
- "Sherry Darling"
- "Stolen Car"
- "Two Hearts"
- "Wreck on the Highway"

Nebraska

- "Atlantic City"
- "Highway Patrolman"
- "Johnny 99"
- "Mansion on the Hill"
- "My Father's House"
- "Nebraska"
- "Open All Night"
- "Reason to Believe"
- "State Trooper"
- "Used Cars"

Born in the U.S.A.

- "Bobby Jean"
- "Born in the U.S.A."
- "Cover Me"
- "Dancing in the Dark"
- "Darlington County"
- "Downbound Train"
- "Glory Days"
- "I'm Going Down"
- "I'm on Fire"
- "My Hometown"
- "No Surrender"
- "Working on the Highway"

Other

- "Be True"
- "Because the Night"
- "Fire"
- "Follow That Dream"
- "Janey, Don't You Lose Heart"
- "Johnny Bye Bye"
- "Man at the Top"
- "Pink Cadillac"
- "Sad Eyes"
- "Seeds"
- "Shut Out the Light"
- "Stand on It"
- "Sugarland"

Cover songs

- "California Sun"
- "Can't Help Falling in Love"
- "Detroit Medley"
- "Do You Love Me?"
- "Drift Away"
- "High School Confidential"
- "I Don't Want to Go Home"
- "I Fought the Law"
- "I Hear a Train"
- "I'm Bad, I'm Nationwide"
- "Jersey Girl"
- "Kansas City"
- "Louie Louie"
- "Memphis Tennessee"
- "My Old Kentucky Home"
- "Mystery Train"
- "New Orleans"
- "Raise Your Hand"
- "Rave On!"
- "Rockin' All Over the World"
- "Santa Claus is Comin' to Town"
- "Street Fighting Man"
- "Sweet Soul Music"
- "Tallahassee Lassie"
- "Theme from The Good, The Bad and the Ugly"
- "This Land is Your Land"
- "Trapped"
- "Travelin' Band"
- "Twist and Shout"
- "Wabash Cannonball"
- "War"
- "When I Grow Up (To Be a Man)"
- "Who'll Stop the Rain"
- "A Woman's Got the Power"
- "Wooly Bully"

Soundchecked/on setlist but not performed

- "Across the Borderline"
- "Bad Moon Rising"
- "Beneath the Floodline"
- "Blinded by the Light"

== Personnel ==
- Bruce Springsteen – lead vocals, guitars, harmonica
- Clarence Clemons – saxophone, congas, percussion, background vocals
- Garry Tallent – bass guitar
- Danny Federici – organ, glockenspiel, piano, synthesizer
- Roy Bittan – piano, synthesizer, background vocals
- Max Weinberg – drums
- Nils Lofgren – guitars, background vocals
- Patti Scialfa – background vocals, synthesizer, tambourine

=== Special guests ===
- Courteney Cox (6/29/84 – danced with Springsteen on "Dancing in the Dark" which was captured in the music video)
- J.T. Bowan (8/9/84)
- John Entwistle (8/11/84)
- Southside Johnny (8/12/84)
- Steven Van Zandt (8/20/84, 12/14/84, 12/16/84, 12/17/84, 7/3/85, 7/4/85, 7/6/85, 7/7/85, 8/22/85)
- The Miami Horns (8/19/84, 8/20/84, 9/14/84)
- Pamela Springsteen (10/22/84 – danced with Bruce on "Dancing in the Dark")
- Gary U.S. Bonds (1/18/85)
- Robbin Thompson (1/18/85)
- Eric Clapton (6/1/85)
- Pete Townshend (6/1/85)
- Jon Landau (9/29/85, 10/2/85)
- Julianne Phillips (10/2/85 – danced with Bruce on "Dancing in the Dark")

== See also ==
- List of highest grossing concert tours
- List of most-attended concert tours
