= Bruce Springsteen with The Sessions Band: Live in Dublin =

Live in Dublin

Live album by Bruce Springsteen
- Released: June 5, 2007
- Recorded: November 17–19, 2006 at Point Theatre
- Genre: Americana
- Length: 123:43
- Label: Columbia
- Producer: George Travis

Bruce Springsteen chronology
We Shall Overcome: The Seeger Sessions (2006)	Live in Dublin (2007)	Magic (2007)

Professional ratings
Review scores
Source	Rating
AllMusic	3.5/5 stars
Pitchfork	7.6/10
Rolling Stone	3.5/5 stars
Tom Hull	B+
Uncut	4/5

Bruce Springsteen with The Sessions Band: Live in Dublin is a 2007 video and audio offering that captures in-concert performances from the Bruce Springsteen with The Seeger Sessions Band Tour recorded in November 2006 at The Point Theatre in Dublin, Ireland. The release consists of a concert DVD, a Blu-ray Disc, and separate two-CD audio set. A "special edition" of the CD set includes the concert DVD as well. The album is dedicated to friend and Irish show-business giant, Jim Aiken.

The DVD does not capture any one show in full, but rather collects recordings from three different shows at The Point. Selections include fan favorites from the tour, radical "folk big band" reinterpretations of the Springsteen canon, and rare songs appearing for the first time on any Springsteen release. At the same time, a few set list regulars from the tour and shows are omitted.

Of note is the dropping of "Seeger" from the band's name for this release, a very belated effort to avoid the mistaken stereotyping the name brought towards the kind of music the outfit was playing.

The DVD debuted at number 1 on the Billboard Video Chart. The CD debuted at number 23 on the Billboard 200, selling 31,000 units, then fell to number 47 in its second week. As of July 11, 2007, it had sold 65,170 copies in the US.

== Track listing ==
All songs are written by Bruce Springsteen, except where noted. Songs 8-10 on disc two are bonus tracks.

Disc one
No.	Title	Writer(s)	Length
1.	"Atlantic City"		5:10
2.	"Old Dan Tucker"		3:31
3.	"Eyes on the Prize"		6:03
4.	"Jesse James"	Traditional	5:35
5.	"Further On (Up The Road)"		5:54
6.	"O Mary Don't You Weep"	Traditional	6:57
7.	"Erie Canal"	Traditional	4:34
8.	"If I Should Fall Behind"		5:13
9.	"My Oklahoma Home"	Bill Cunningham	8:25
10.	"Highway Patrolman"		5:47
11.	"Mrs. McGrath"	Traditional	5:03
12.	"How Can a Poor Man Stand Such Times and Live?"	Blind Alfred Reed	3:20
13.	"Jacob's Ladder"	Pete Seeger	6:59

Disc two
No.	Title	Writer(s)	Length
1.	"Long Time Comin'"		4:48
2.	"Open All Night"		8:04
3.	"Pay Me My Money Down"	Traditional	5:59
4.	"Growin' Up"		4:31
5.	"When The Saints Go Marching In"	Traditional	5:12
6.	"This Little Light Of Mine"	Traditional	3:08
7.	"American Land"		4:22
8.	"Blinded By The Light"		4:43
9.	"Love Of The Common People" (duet with Curtis King Jr.)	John Hurley, Ronnie Wilkins	4:39
10.	"We Shall Overcome"	Pete Seeger	5:46

(The DVD includes an uncredited backstage performance of "Cadillac Ranch".)

== PBS Edition bonus songs ==
A special edition given as a donation reward during PBS pledge drives includes performances of five extra songs:

1. "Bobby Jean"
2. "The Ghost of Tom Joad"
3. "Johnny 99"
4. "For You"
5. "My City of Ruins"

These songs were released on streaming platforms in February 2020.

== Personnel ==
- Bruce Springsteen – vocals, guitar, harmonica
- Sam Bardfeld – violin, vocals
- Art Baron – sousaphone, trombone, mandolin, penny whistle, euphonium
- Frank Bruno – acoustic guitar, vocals, field drum
- Jeremy Chatzky – bass guitar, double bass
- Larry Eagle – drums, percussion
- Clark Gayton – trombone, vocals, percussion
- Charles Giordano – accordion, piano, Hammond organ, vocals
- Curtis King Jr. – vocals, percussion
- Greg Liszt – banjo, vocals
- Lisa Lowell – vocals, percussion
- Ed Manion – tenor and baritone saxophones, vocals, percussion
- Cindy Mizelle – vocals, percussion
- Curt Ramm – trumpet, vocals, percussion
- Marty Rifkin – pedal steel guitar, dobro, mandolin
- Patti Scialfa – acoustic guitar, vocals
- Marc Anthony Thompson – acoustic guitar, vocals
- Soozie Tyrell – violin, vocals

== Charts ==
=== Weekly charts ===
Weekly chart performance for Bruce Springsteen with The Sessions Band: Live in Dublin
Chart (2007)	Peak position
Australian Albums (ARIA)	40
Austrian Albums (Ö3 Austria)	20
Belgian Albums (Ultratop Flanders)	8
Belgian Albums (Ultratop Wallonia)	49
Danish Albums (Hitlisten)	5
Dutch Albums (Album Top 100)	4
French Albums (SNEP)	27
German Albums (Offizielle Top 100)	11
Irish Albums (IRMA)	1
Italian Albums (FIMI)	4
New Zealand Albums (RMNZ)	11
Norwegian Albums (VG-lista)	2
Spanish Albums (Promusicae)	3
Swedish Albums (Sverigetopplistan)	2
Swiss Albums (Schweizer Hitparade)	28
UK Albums (Official Charts)	21
US Billboard 200	23

=== Year-end charts ===
Year-end chart performance for Bruce Springsteen with The Sessions Band: Live in Dublin
Chart (2007)	Position
Dutch Albums (Album Top 100)	60

== Certifications ==
Certifications for Bruce Springsteen with The Sessions Band: Live in Dublin
Region	Certification	Certified units/sales
Australia (ARIA) DVD	Platinum	15,000^{^}
United States (RIAA) DVD	Gold	50,000^{^}
^{^} Shipments figures based on certification alone.
