= My Father's House =

My Father's House may refer to:

- My Father's House (film), a 1947 British Mandatory Palestine-American drama film
- My Father's House (song), a song by Bruce Springsteen
- My Father's House (The Colbys), an episode of The Colbys
