= That's the Truth (Johnny Cash song) =

Song by Johnny Cash

Single by Johnny Cash

from the album Johnny 99
- B-side: "Joshua Gone Barbados"
- Released: 1984
- Genre: Country
- Label: Columbia 38-04428
- Songwriter: Paul Kennerley
- Producer: Brian Ahern

Johnny Cash singles chronology
"Johnny 99" (1983)	"That's the Truth" (1984)	"The Chicken in Black" (1984)

Audio
- "That's the Truth" on YouTube

"That's the Truth" is a song written by Paul Kennerley and originally recorded by Johnny Cash for his 1983 album Johnny 99.

Paul Kennerley is an Englishman and he wrote the Jesse James album of which I was a part of along with Emmylou Harris, Levon Helm and Charlie Daniels. Paul Kennerly is one of those unique writers who can write on assignment. You can tell him what you want written and he can write it. Like he wrote the Jesse James album, and he also wrote White Mansions that Waylon was on. But he's written all these songs, and these two of his that I recorded—"Brand New Dance" with June Carter, and "That's the Truth"—we didn't ask him for 'em, but we had about six or eight Paul Kennerley songs to pick from. He's got some really good songs that I have on hold—course a lot of other people do, too, because he's such a great writer.

— Johnny Cash on Paul Kennerley and the album Johnny 99

Released in 1984 as a single (Columbia 38-04428, with "Joshua Gone Barbados" on the B-side) from that album, the song reached number 84 on U.S. Billboard's country chart for the week of May 19.

== Track listing ==
7" single (Columbia 38-04428, 1984)
No.	Title	Writer(s)	Length
1.	"That's the Truth"	P. Kennerley	2:45
2.	"Joshua Gone Barbados"	E. Von Schmidt	5:06

== Charts ==
Chart (1984)	Peak position
US Hot Country Songs (Billboard)	84
