= Nebraska (album) =

1982 studio album by Bruce Springsteen

Studio album by Bruce Springsteen
- Released: September 30, 1982
- Recorded: December 17, 1981 – January 3, 1982; (except May 25, 1982, for "My Father's House")
- Studio: Springsteen's home in Colts Neck, New Jersey
- Genre: Folk
- Length: 41:02
- Label: Columbia
- Producer: Mike Batlan (engineer) (Note: Nebraska's LP sleeve does not list an official producer, instead crediting Mike Batlan as the recording engineer. Speaking to Warren Zanes, Springsteen's manager, Jon Landau, explained that due to the album's "special way of coming into being", giving Springsteen a producer credit "didn't feel right to Bruce". Landau believed Springsteen was the only one worthy of the title but he "didn't take it for himself": "So there's no producer". Other sources list Springsteen as the producer.)

Bruce Springsteen chronology
| The River (1980) | Nebraska (1982) | Born in the U.S.A. (1984) |

Singles from Nebraska
- 1. "Atlantic City" Released: October 1982 (Europe and Japan only); 2. "Open All Night" Released: November 22, 1982 (Europe only)

Nebraska is the sixth studio album by the American singer-songwriter Bruce Springsteen, released on September 30, 1982, through Columbia Records. Springsteen recorded the songs unaccompanied on a four-track recorder in the bedroom of his home in Colts Neck, New Jersey. He had intended to rerecord the tracks with the E Street Band but decided to release them as they were, after deeming the full-band renditions to be unsatisfactory. The tape contained 17 songs, of which 10 were used for Nebraska; the others appeared in full-band renditions on the follow-up album Born in the U.S.A. (1984) or as B-sides.

Living isolated in Colts Neck, Springsteen was influenced by folk music, American literature, and film when writing the lyrics. The short stories of Flannery O'Connor particularly inspired him to write about his childhood memories. The album contains a stark, lo-fi sound, as the tracks tell the stories of blue-collar workers who try to succeed in life but fail at every turn, while searching for a deliverance that never comes. Some of the lyrics are in the voice of outlaws and criminals, including the killer Charles Starkweather on the title track. The album's artwork is a 1975 photograph by David Michael Kennedy which depicts a black-top road under a cloudy sky through the windshield of a car.

Nebraska stylistically stood apart from other releases in 1982. Commercially, it charted within the top 10 in Australia, Canada, Japan, the Netherlands, New Zealand, Norway, Sweden, the United Kingdom, and the United States. The album was accompanied by two European singles—"Atlantic City" and "Open All Night"; the former supported by Springsteen's first music video. He did not do promotional work for the record, believing listeners should experience it for themselves. Critics praised the album as brave and artistically daring, considering it Springsteen's most personal record up to that point. Negative reviews felt that the songs stylistically merged, and their dark themes would appeal only to fans. The album appeared on several year-end lists.

Retrospectively, critics regard Nebraska as a timeless record and one of Springsteen's finest works. The album has appeared on numerous lists of the greatest albums of all time. It is recognized as one of the first do it yourself (DIY) home recordings by a major artist and has had a significant influence on the indie rock and underground music scenes. Numerous artists have paid tribute to the album and have cited its impact on their music. A biographical film based on the album's creation, titled Springsteen: Deliver Me from Nowhere, was released on October 24, 2025. An expanded edition of the album, featuring Electric Nebraska, was released the same day.

== Background and development ==
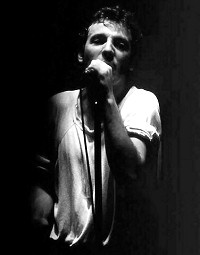
Springsteen in 1981

Bruce Springsteen's fifth studio album The River (1980) was his most commercially successful album to that point. However, the newfound media attention from the album and The River Tour supporting it led him to reconsider his role as an artist. He explained that The River's success led to "very conflicted feelings about being so separate from the people that I'd grown up around and that I wrote about". At the end of the tour, he retreated to his newly-rented ranch in Colts Neck, New Jersey, in September 1981.

Living in rural Colts Neck, Springsteen immersed himself in American history, books and film in search of stories to use for his songs. He read books such as Joe Klein's Woody Guthrie: A Life (1980), Howard Zinn's A People's History of the United States (1980), Allan Nevins and Henry Steele Commager's A Pocket History of the United States, and Ron Kovic's autobiography Born on the Fourth of July (1976). He was inspired by films such as John Ford's adaptation of The Grapes of Wrath (1940), Terrence Malick's Badlands (1973), John Huston's adaptation of Wise Blood (1979), and Ulu Grosbard's True Confessions (1981). Springsteen reflected on his childhood and studied the romans noirs (dark crime novels) of James M. Cain and Jim Thompson, the Southern Gothic short stories of Flannery O'Connor and the music of Guthrie, Bob Dylan, and Hank Williams. (Note: Springsteen had recently performed Guthrie's "This Land Is Your Land" throughout the River Tour.) PopMatters's Bill See says that from these sources, Springsteen retrieved "a humanity and a curiosity about why certain people lose connection with themselves, their families, their community, [and] their government".

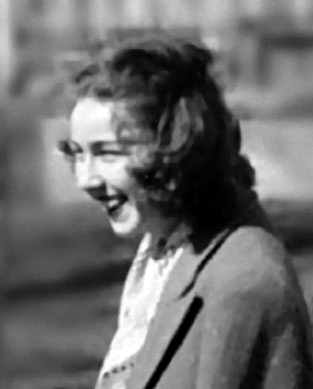
The short stories of Flannery O'Connor (pictured in 1947) influenced Springsteen when writing Nebraska.

O'Connor's writings became particularly influential. The author and critic Dave Marsh said that Springsteen became impressed by the "minute precision" of O'Connor's prose and believed that he had felt that his songwriting had been too vague, instead wanting to write songs that were more detailed and concrete, away from the "clash and babble of metaphor" found occasionally on his previous albums. O'Connor wrote some of her stories from a child's perspective, which inspired Springsteen to write songs in a similar manner. Springsteen himself stated that the songs from the period were more "connected" to his childhood than ever before. O'Connor's Catholicism was also an influence. Springsteen stated in his 2003 book Songs: "Her stories reminded me of the unknowability of God and contained a dark spirituality that resonated with my own feelings at the time." Songs written during the period featured stories ranging from Springsteen's childhood to ones about criminals and violence, as well as one about a Vietnam veteran returning home from the war to an unenthusiastic response.

== Recording ==
=== Colts Neck ===
Annoyed at how long it took him to record in the studio, Springsteen decided to record the new songs as solo demos, intending to rerecord them with the E Street Band—Roy Bittan (piano), Clarence Clemons (saxophone), Danny Federici (organ), Garry Tallent (bass), Steven Van Zandt (guitar), and Max Weinberg (drums)—at a later date. (Note: Attributed to multiple references:) He later told the author Warren Zanes: "The recordings were just meant to get us a jump start on work in the studio with the band. I'd always spent a lot of time writing in the studio. I was trying to be more efficient, I guess. Certainly trying to spend a little less money."

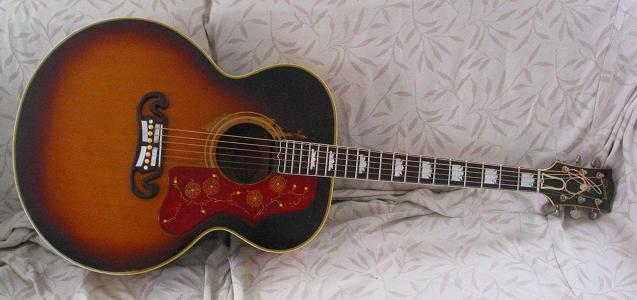
Springsteen played a Gibson J-200 acoustic guitar for Nebraska, similar to the one pictured here.

Springsteen tasked his guitar technician, Mike Batlan, with buying a simple tape recorder to work out some demos and tinker with arrangements. Batlan picked up a four-track TEAC 144 Portastudio recorder, a then-relatively new device that allowed musicians to perform a basic track first before adding additional parts on the remaining tracks. Springsteen believed these overdubbed instruments would help the band understand how the final track should sound. He and Batlan set the recorder up in the bedroom of his Colts Neck home. They connected the machine to two Shure SM57 microphones on stands. Springsteen played a Gibson J-200 acoustic guitar, overdubbing harmonica, percussion, mandolin, and glockenspiel. The demos were recorded between December 17, 1981, and January 3, 1982. (Note: Some commentators state the entire tape was recorded on January 3, 1982, although others place the recording between December 17, 1981, and January 3, 1982. According to Geoffrey Himes, Springsteen and Batlan "mixed the best songs from the new work the singer had been recording" on January 3.) Most of the basic tracks (vocals and acoustic guitar) were finished in four to six takes.

Springsteen and Batlan mixed the sound by plugging the recorder into an Echoplex, a tape delay effects machine, and using an old water-logged Panasonic boombox (Note: The boombox had fallen into a river while on a boating trip. The machine died but unexpectedly restarted a week later.) as a mix-down deck to bring the final mix onto a cassette tape. In Songs, Springsteen stated he recorded this way because he "found the atmosphere in the studio to be sterile and isolating". Fifteen songs appeared on the initial cassette tape: "Bye Bye Johnny", (Note: "Bye Bye Johnny" was a Chuck Berry cover. According to Warren Zanes, "Bye Bye Johnny" appeared on the tape, with a handwritten note by Springsteen stating "No explanation necessary". However, according to Clinton Heylin, it was the original "Johnny Bye-Bye" that appeared on the tape, which he believes was probably a live version from the River Tour rather than a newly recorded demo.) "Starkweather"/"Nebraska", "Atlantic City", "Mansion on the Hill", "Born in the U.S.A.", "Johnny 99", "Downbound Train", "The Losin' Kind", "State Trooper", "Used Cars", "Wanda (Open All Night)", "Child Bride", "Pink Cadillac", "Highway Patrolman", and "Reason to Believe".

After the tracks were mixed, Springsteen sent the tape to his manager-producer Jon Landau with two pages of handwritten notes about arrangements and mixes. According to the biographer Peter Ames Carlin, Landau was "impressed by the power of the songs' minimalist narratives" and the "yelping desperation in the performances". Springsteen recorded two more songs over the following months at Colts Neck: "The Big Payback" between March and April, (Note: Heylin states in the liner notes to the 2003 compilation album The Essential Bruce Springsteen that "The Big Payback" was recorded "shortly after" the Nebraska tape was completed.) and "My Father's House" on May 25.

=== Attempted rerecordings ===
In April 1982, Springsteen and the E Street Band rehearsed the demos at Bittan's house before regrouping at the Power Station in New York City to rerecord them for release on the next album. (Note: Springsteen and the E Street Band previously recorded The River at the Power Station.) The band spent two weeks attempting full-band arrangements of the Colts Neck tracks, but Springsteen and his co-producers—Landau, Van Zandt, and Chuck Plotkin—were dissatisfied with the results. Springsteen, in particular, felt many of the full-band versions failed to capture the spirit of the demos, while Plotkin blamed the studio's "tendency to conventionalize sounds". Other songs from the tape, including "Born in the U.S.A.", "Downbound Train", "Child Bride" (rewritten as "Working on the Highway"), and "Pink Cadillac" proved successful in full-band arrangements. Continuing into May, the band also recorded newly-written songs, including "Glory Days", "I'm Goin' Down", "I'm on Fire", "Wages of Sin", and "Johnny Bye-Bye". (Note: Originally titled "Come On (Let's Go Tonight)", "Johnny Bye-Bye" was an Elvis Presley tribute that was a partial rewrite of Chuck Berry's "Bye Bye Johnny". Springsteen had debuted it during the River Tour.)

Despite the band's productivity and excitement about the recorded material, Springsteen remained focused on the rest of the Colts Neck songs. Attached to the cassette's "authentic" sound, he carried it with him in his jeans pocket, unsure of what to do with the material. Throughout June, Springsteen and his co-producers began mixing and sequencing the acoustic and electric material as separate albums. At some point, a decision was made to release the acoustic demos as is. (Note: According to Zanes, Plotkin credits Landau with the idea of releasing the demos, Landau credits Springsteen, while Van Zandt believes it was his idea. Dave Marsh also credits Landau.) Springsteen briefly considered releasing a double album of acoustic and electric songs before deciding to release the acoustic ones on their own to give them "greater stature". (Note: Attributed to multiple references:) Van Zandt told Springsteen: "The fact that you didn't intend to release it makes it the most intimate record you'll ever do. This is an absolutely legitimate piece of art." The acoustic album, titled Nebraska, became Springsteen's first and only album he made without knowing he was making a record.

Springsteen's fans long speculated whether the full-band recordings of the Nebraska material, nicknamed Electric Nebraska, would ever surface. Having never appeared on bootlegs, it was among the most sought after of Springsteen's unreleased material. In a 1984 interview with Rolling Stone, Springsteen believed an official release was unlikely, saying: "A lot of [Nebraska's] content was in its style, in the treatment of it. It needed that really kinda austere, echoey sound, just one guitar—one guy telling his story." Decades later in a 2010 interview with Rolling Stone, Weinberg praised the full-band renditions as "killing" and "very hard-edged". After years of denying the project's existence, Springsteen confirmed in 2025 that Electric Nebraska does exist in his vault, though it "does not have the full album of songs". The recordings were officially released as part of the Nebraska '82: Expanded Edition box set on October 24, 2025.

=== Mastering ===
Springsteen tasked the engineer Toby Scott with mastering the recordings, which proved problematic due to how Springsteen and Batlan recorded them. According to Classic Rock Review, the demos were not recorded at optimal volume or with optimal noise reduction, meaning it was difficult to transfer the recordings to vinyl. For weeks, Plotkin and Scott attempted to transfer the recordings through the mixing console in the Power Station with no success. Attempts at remixing Springsteen and Batlan's original mixes also failed. Plotkin and Scott eventually took the tape to different mastering facilities, with failed attempts by the mastering engineers Bob Ludwig, Steve Marcussen, and Greg Calbi. After two months, the final master was made at New York City's Atlantic Studios by Dennis King, who was able to resolve the tape's low recording volume with noise reduction techniques. In a 2007 interview, Scott explained: "[W]e ended up having Bob Ludwig use his EQ and his mastering facility, but with Dennis [King's] mastering parameters. And that's the master we ended up using."

== Composition ==
I wanted black bedtime stories. I thought of the records of John Lee Hooker and Robert Johnson, music that sounded so good with the lights out. I wanted the listener to hear my characters think, to feel their thoughts, their choices. [...] If there's a theme that runs through the record, it's the thin line between stability and that moment when time stops and everything goes to black, when the things that connect you to your world–your job, your family, friends, your faith, the love and grace in your heart–fail you.

— Bruce Springsteen, Songs, 2003

Nebraska represented a major stylistic departure for Springsteen, although several songs from The River foreshadowed its direction, including "Stolen Car", "The River", and "Wreck On the Highway". Featuring only Springsteen, Nebraska is a minimalist folk record, with heartland rock, lo-fi, and country influences. (Note: See specific sources for attribution. Minimalist; folk; heartland rock; lo-fi; country.) Commentators have described its music and lyrics as stark, bleak, haunting, somber, and brutal. (Note: See specific sources for attribution. Stark; bleak; haunting; somber; depressing; brutal.) AllMusic's William Ruhlmann called the recordings themselves "unpolished" and sounding unfinished. Bill See and Martin Chilton commented on the numerous "imperfections" in the mix, including "the creaking of a chair, the 'P's' that pop, the over-modulated harmonicas and Jimmy Rogers-like howls that pin the VU meters". Joe Pelone of punknews.org argues that the album's lo-fi nature gives the songs a "hazy atmosphere" that "forces listeners to imagine more about what's going on, creating sounds that aren't there". Springsteen explained: "My Nebraska songs were the opposite of the rock music I'd been writing. These new songs were narrative, restrained, linear, and musically minimal. Yet their depiction of characters out on the edge contextualized them as rock and roll."

Nebraska tells the stories of ordinary, blue-collar workers who try to succeed in life but fail at every turn. Caught in the midst of existential crises, they realize that their lives are devoid of meaning and search for a deliverance that never comes. Their desperation and alienation pushes them to commit unspeakable acts. Bill See commented on the subservient role the working class characters have accepted through the use of the words "sir" and "son". In their analyses of the album, the writers Ryan Sheeler and David McLaughlin state that the songs dissect the vulnerability of the American Dream, offering a harsh look on life through the eyes of outlaws, poor folk, and estranged families, and what happens when the pillars of life – work, love, family and friends – crumble and there is nowhere left to run. Several commentators, including the critic Greil Marcus, interpreted the album's stories and themes as reflections of America during the presidency of Ronald Reagan, although Steven Hyden states that the songs were not "explicitly" or "implicitly" political, but were interpreted as such due to the timing of the album's release. In his 1985 book on Springsteen, Robert Hilburn said the Nebraska songs were simply "an extension of the social concerns he began expressing on The River Tour".

Stories told through the eyes of criminals include "Nebraska" and "Johnny 99", while Springsteen's own childhood memories are reflected on "Mansion on the Hill", "Used Cars", and "My Father's House". Several songs' lyrics center around automobiles. Compared to Springsteen's previous records, where the car represented escape (Born to Run) and a place where stories unfolded (Darkness on the Edge of Town and portions of The River), the car on Nebraska represents a chamber that keeps its characters isolated, or one they travel in while searching for some type of connection as the world passes them by.

=== Side one ===
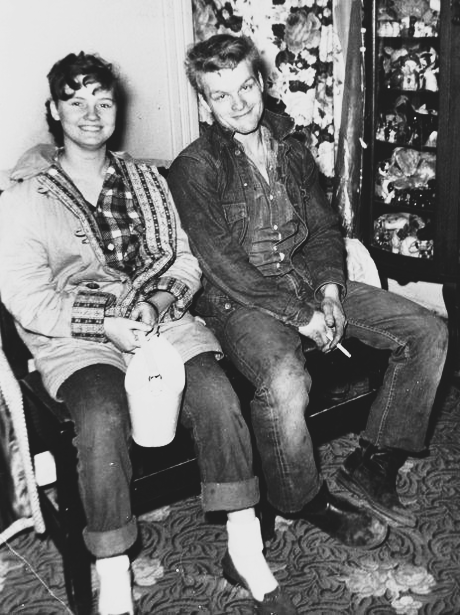
"Nebraska" is sung from the point-of-view of the killer Charles Starkweather, pictured here with his girlfriend Caril Ann Fugate in December 1957.

The opening track, "Nebraska", tells the story of the killer Charles Starkweather, who murdered ten people from 1957 to 1958 in Nebraska and Wyoming while traveling with his 14-year-old girlfriend Caril Ann Fugate. (Note: Attributed to multiple references:) After his capture, Starkweather is sentenced to death by electric chair. In the song's lyrics, the killer remains unrepentant, blaming his actions on the "meanness" of the world. (Note: This line is fictional. Springsteen took the quote from another killer in O'Connor's short story "A Good Man Is Hard to Find".) Springsteen wrote the song after watching Badlands, a film inspired by the couple, and reading the Ninette Beaver book Caril (1974). The song is sung from a first-person perspective; Springsteen said in 2005 that "everyone knows what it is like to be condemned". The song's music was described by Rolling Stone's Steve Pond as "gentle" and "soothing".

"Atlantic City" follows mob wars in the titular Atlantic City, New Jersey. At the time it was written, Atlantic City was controlled by corruption and had turned to gambling in hopes of revitalizing the city. In the song, a young man struggles to make an honest living, forcing him and his girlfriend to relocate to the city so he can join the mob. Springsteen mentions "the Chicken Man from Philly", which referred to the mafia boss Philip Testa, who was murdered in 1981. Margotin and Guesdon note the song's "dense atmosphere and the performance's feeling or urgency".

"Mansion on the Hill" evokes Springsteen's childhood memories, remembering a large mansion on top of a hill that piqued his curiosity and car rides with his father. Its title was taken from the Hank Williams song "A Mansion on the Hill" (1948). Like other songs on the album, the musical arrangement is minimal, with guitar and harmonica. Margotin and Guesdon note "a spellbinding, hypnotic atmosphere" that is "filled with emotion and restraint".

In "Johnny 99", the narrator loses his job at the Ford assembly plant in Mahwah, New Jersey, following its closure, and takes out his frustration by murdering a hotel clerk; he is captured and subsequently sentenced to 99 years in prison and begs for the death penalty. (Note: Attributed to multiple references:) Unlike the murderer in "Nebraska", the perpetrator on "Johnny 99" shows remorse for his action, saying he is "better off dead" due to his large debts and his house being foreclosed. Musically, it features a rock'n'roll/rockabilly rhythm with echoed vocals and an ambient atmosphere. AllMusic's William Ruhlmann describes Springsteen's performance as "raucous", one that starts with "lonely falsetto wails" and ends with "exuberant falsetto shouts".

"Highway Patrolman" contrasts the obligation to enforce the law with the familial loyalty tied to blood relations. It tells the story of an honest police officer named Joe Roberts who is given a choice of turning his own brother in for committing a crime or letting him go, ultimately going the latter. Springsteen argues in the song's chorus, "Man turns his back on his family/Well, he just ain't no good."

"State Trooper" is a lo-fi folk song led solely by vocals and guitar. Classic Rock Review describes the guitar line as emulating "the recurring sound of the road". Musically, the track was directly influenced by "Frankie Teardrop" by the synth-punk band Suicide. Lyrically, the song is told from the point-of-view of a car thief; he does not have a license or registration and becomes increasingly paranoid the farther he travels on a deserted highway. The verses end with the driver's plea to a state trooper—either real or imaginary—not to stop him as he drives through the night.

=== Side two ===
"Used Cars" describes Springsteen's childhood experiences with his father and differences in social classes growing up. Set to gentle music, the narrator watches his father purchase a used car as the family cannot afford a new one. The father, worn from years of manual labor and ashamed of his poor income, is unable to share his feelings with his son. The family shows off their "brand new used car" to the neighbors, after which the narrator clings to the hope that he can escape from this reality and win the lottery, vowing he is "never gonna ride in no used car again".

"Open All Night" has a more light-hearted mood compared to the rest of the album, being an up-tempo rock song with a Chuck Berry-style melody and rhythm. (Note: Attributed to multiple references:) The singer wants to be delivered from nowhere, but requests that rock and roll music accompany his long journey driving down the New Jersey Turnpike. The song was inspired by an unnamed short story by the novelist William Price Fox.

"My Father's House" is the final song on the album relating to Springsteen's childhood. It returns to a sadder mood, wherein the narrator has a dream in which, as a child, he is saved by his father from dark forces in a forest. Upon waking up, he decides to reconcile with his estranged father. When the narrator arrives at his father's house, the narrator finds he no longer lives there, with his dreams of making peace with his father crushed.

In the album's closing track, "Reason to Believe", Springsteen tells four short stories across four verses: a man hopes to revive a dead dog on the side of a highway by poking it; a woman waits at the end of a road for a man who never comes; a child is born and a man dies; and a groom waits for the bride who stood him up. The verses are unified by the singer's humorous outlook that individuals always find "some reason to believe". The author Rob Kirkpatrick argues that the song's point is that "people endure, that they struggle against all evidence to the contrary, because it's the only thing that they can do—or else they end up dead, spiritually or literally". According to the writer Irwin Streight, the song "seeks to resolve the litanies of meanness, desperation, hopelessness, and longing recounted in the preceding stories, and to resolve them in a decidedly Catholic fashion". Margotin and Guesdon describe the musical performance as emitting "sorrow and fatalism".

== Artwork and packaging ==
The cover artwork of Nebraska is a black-and-white photograph of a black-top road under a cloudy sky taken through the windshield of a car. The photograph was originally taken by the landscape photographer David Michael Kennedy during the winter of 1975. Springsteen did not want himself on the cover, instead envisioning a landscape. (Note: The cover is one of a small number of Springsteen's studio album covers to not feature his face, alongside Greetings from Asbury Park, N.J. (1973), Human Touch (1992), The Ghost of Tom Joad (1995), and Western Stars (2019).) Kennedy was hired by the art director Andrea Klein after showing Springsteen some of Kennedy's work. Kennedy provided various images before Springsteen selected the final one. Some commentators have agreed that the artwork matches the album's tone and mood perfectly. The singer's name and album title appear in bright red above and below the image, respectively, stylized in all caps. Springsteen said of the image:

"I liked the photograph [Klein] found and what was done with it, just the stark red-and-black, black-and-white layout, and the big letters. It was all just very bloody in its own way. I remember a lot of work, a lot of fussing over many of the album covers, but I don't remember Nebraska being one of them."

The back of the sleeve contains a photograph of Springsteen in a brightly lit room taken by Kennedy in his Brewster, New York, home. Springsteen said he wanted his presence both known and unknown: "The picture we used inside, it was kind of my ghost. It wasn't quite me. It was ... the earlier part of yourself that stays with you." The inside sleeve includes lyrics of the album's ten songs. The album title was not chosen until shortly before the album's release. Nearly half of the song titles were considered, including State Trooper, Used Cars, and Reason to Believe, before Springsteen settled on Nebraska after the first song on the album and the first one he recorded.

== Release ==
What I thought and knew was that we could put this tape out and it would be a sensational record. ... I didn't know what would happen to it—how many people would hear it, what room there was for it on radio. ... After all, even if we had gotten the band on all the Nebraska material, nobody thought that this was the most commercial stuff Bruce had ever written. That was not one of the reactions anybody had.

— Jon Landau, 1987

Columbia and its international arm CBS Records were ecstatic when Springsteen and Landau presented Nebraska to them. Columbia and CBS's presidents, Walter Yetnikoff and Al Teller respectively, believed the album would not sell as well as The River. However, they loved the music and felt it marked an artistic growth for Springsteen. Teller promised a more subdued advertising campaign compared to The River while anticipating sales of less than one million. The press advertisements proclaimed "Nobody but Springsteen can Tell Stories Like These".

Nebraska was released on September 30, 1982. In a year dominated by British synth-pop, the album stood apart from other releases in the year by pop artists such as A Flock of Seagulls, Lionel Richie, Olivia Newton-John and the Human League. Upon release, the album confused both casual and serious fans, but sold well, debuting on the US Billboard Top LPs & Tape chart at number 29, peaking at number three. By 1989, it had sold one million copies and was certified platinum by the Recording Industry Association of America (RIAA). Elsewhere, the album peaked at number two in Sweden, three in Canada, Norway, New Zealand, and the UK, seven in the Netherlands, eight in Australia, and ten in Japan. It reached number 18 in France and 37 in West Germany.

=== Singles and aftermath ===
Nebraska was supported by two singles. The first, "Atlantic City", with "Mansion on the Hill" as the B-side, was released in Europe and Japan in October 1982. Springsteen's first music video was produced for rotation on MTV. Directed by Arnold Levine, the "Atlantic City" video does not feature Springsteen himself, but contains black-and-white documentary-style footage of the titular city. Commentators have described the video as "bleak" and "atmospheric". "Open All Night" was released as the second single, again in Europe only, on November 22. Its B-side was "The Big Payback", a rockabilly song with lyrics related to working life.

Springsteen did not promote the album with interviews or a tour. In his 2016 autobiography Born to Run, he wrote that "it felt too soon after The River, and Nebraska's quiet stillness would take me a while longer to bring to the stage". He further stated that he wanted listeners to first experience the album for themselves: "I thought I could only hurt the project at that moment by trying to explain it ... if I could explain it." He first performed the Nebraska songs throughout the 1984–1985 Born in the U.S.A. Tour.

Following Nebraska's release, Springsteen vacationed on a road trip to California where he demoed new songs in a similar style to Nebraska. He returned to New York in April 1983 to continue recording with the E Street Band. Sessions lasted until February 1984, during which the band recorded between 70 and 90 songs. The follow-up to Nebraska, Born in the U.S.A., was released in June 1984. A rock and roll record, it featured full-band arrangements of three songs from the original Colts Neck tape: "Born in the U.S.A.", "Downbound Train" and "Working on the Highway" (reworked from "Child Bride"), while the electric versions of "Pink Cadillac" and "Johnny Bye-Bye" were released as the B-sides of the "Dancing in the Dark" and "I'm on Fire" singles, respectively. The crime tale "The Losin' Kind" was officially released as part of the Nebraska '82: Expanded Edition box set on October 17, 2025. (Note: Springsteen taped a new version of "The Losin' Kind" during the 1983 Los Angeles home sessions, which remains unreleased.)

== Critical reception ==
Professional ratings
Initial reviews
Review scores
| Source | Rating |
|---|---|
| Record Mirror | 4/5 stars |
| Rolling Stone | 4.5/5 stars |
| Smash Hits | 6½/10 |
| Sounds | 4/5 stars |
| The Village Voice | A− |

On its original release, critical reception to Nebraska was mostly positive. It was hailed by critics for its boldness and individuality, being called an unexpected, brave, and artistically daring record. Its stylistic departure from Springsteen's previous works came as a shock to some critics. Robert Hilburn compared the change in style to when Bob Dylan went electric, and called Nebraska "one of the most bold uncompromising artistic statements since John Lennon's Plastic Ono Band album in 1970".

Critics described Nebraska as Springsteen's most personal album up to that point; (Note: Attributed to multiple references:) the San Francisco Chronicle's Joel Selvin declared: "Never before has a major recording artist made himself so vulnerable or open." In The New York Times, Robert Palmer summarized: "It's been a long time since a mainstream rock star made an album that asks such tough questions and refuses to settle for easy answers – let alone an album suggesting that perhaps there are no answers." Rolling Stone's Steve Pond praised Nebraska as a "tactical masterstroke", positively compared it to Darkness on the Edge of Town (1978), and commended Springsteen's "sharp focus" and "insistence on painting small details so clearly and his determination to make a folk album firmly in the tradition". Trouser Press's Jon Young praised Springsteen's growth as an artist and felt he succeeded as a "guitar-strumming storyteller", saying: "He may have scaled down his attack, but Springsteen hasn't diminished his ambition one bit."

Several reviewers commented on the acoustic instrumentation. (Note: Attributed to multiple references:) In Record Mirror, Mike Gardner felt that critics who believed Springsteen's power came solely from the E Street Band would be proven wrong, and wrote that his "gift for making epic aural stories out of such material is turned on its head by the simple backing". Writing for Sounds magazine, Johnny Waller enjoyed the "new perspective" gained from listening to the material in a back-to-basics approach. Time magazine's Jay Cocks compared the sound to "a Library of Congress field recording made out behind some shutdown auto plant". Cocks noticed a recycling of lyrical themes from older records, but felt they worked to Springsteen's advantage: "he can get the same sort of mythic resonance from this setting that John Ford took out of Monument Valley." Commenting on the album's recording methods, The Boston Phoenix's Ariel Swartley said Nebraska is "the rock-and-roller's version of joining a monastery or running away to farm: solo, acoustic, old-fashioned, homemade."

Other critics were more negative. Some felt that, due to similar music and themes, the songs stylistically merged together. The Village Voice's Robert Christgau criticized the music, arguing that Springsteen lacked the vocal and melodic imagination to "enrich these bitter tales of late capitalism" with bare instrumentation. More negatively, The Washington Post's Richard Harrington said Nebraska "may be the most undynamic album of 1982", panning the "horrid" and "flat" sound quality and concluding: "One applauds Springsteen's commitment, but questions its ponderous and portentous execution." Musician magazine's Paul Nelson said the album sounded "demoralizing", "murderously monotonous", and "deprived of spark or hope", but in the end, he "found a road map that led to the right places". In Smash Hits, David Hepworth felt that due to the album's dark tone and "bleak pessimism", it would likely only be appreciated by fans. In Creem, Richard C. Walls enjoyed the album, but suspected that most listeners would find it "more admirable than likable".

In The Village Voice's annual Pazz & Jop critics poll, Nebraska was voted the third best album of 1982, behind Elvis Costello's Imperial Bedroom and Richard and Linda Thompson's Shoot Out the Lights. Rolling Stone included it in their list of the year's top 40 albums, while NME placed it at number 33 in their end-of-year list. Time included it in their list of the year's best albums.

== Retrospective reviews ==
Professional ratings
Retrospective reviews
Review scores
| Source | Rating |
|---|---|
| AllMusic | 5/5 stars |
| Chicago Tribune | 3/4 stars |
| The Encyclopedia of Popular Music | 4/5 stars |
| MusicHound Rock | 3.5/5 |
| New Musical Express | 7/10 |
| Pitchfork | 10/10 |
| Q | 2/5 stars |
| The Rolling Stone Album Guide | 5/5 stars |
| Tom Hull | B+ |

In later decades, Nebraska has been ranked as one of Springsteen's finest records. (Note: Attributed to multiple references:) Critics have called the record a masterpiece, (Note: Attributed to multiple references:) a classic, and one of the boldest albums ever released by a major artist. Margotin and Guesdon said that with Nebraska, Springsteen elevated himself amongst the best singers in American popular music. Bill See described Nebraska as "high art" on par with Guthrie, Steinbeck, and O'Connor. It has been called an outlier in Springsteen's discography, being released between the stadium rock records The River and Born in the U.S.A. It is also considered by Steven Hyden and Spin's Al Shipley as the album non-Springsteen fans enjoy the most.

Nebraska has been applauded for its storytelling, themes, and production. Martin Chilton and William Ruhlmann argue its unpolished nature and imperfections are a part of its charm. Pitchfork's Mark Richardson said the songs are "very good", but "their true meaning came out in the presentation". Sheeler commended Springsteen's ability to effectively weave himself as both narrator and character in the songs, wherein "the lines are blurred and each scene seems like a homespun conversation with each character" as they share their experiences. Mojo's Sylvie Simmons said it was "that nakedness and willingness to face the darkness head-on that made Nebraska a touchstone for a whole new wave of young American bands."

Nebraska may stand as Springsteen's most heroic moment. It may also be the album of his that will outlive the others, because of the timelessness of its style and its refusal to run away from the anguish of the human spirit.

— Robert Hilburn, Springsteen, 1985

Nebraska has been described as a timeless record, retaining all of its power and its themes remaining relevant decades after its release. Zanes argued the album's power was unveiled in the years following its initial release and listeners discovered it on their own time, being "passed around like a rumor". Hyden similarly said that the album's stories of suffering can translate to "whatever era [listeners] happen to live in". The Ringer's Elizabeth Nelson wrote that the stories of haunted highways and characters "still haunt the American psyche", while The Daily Telegraph's Ian Winwood said the album remains Springsteen's "most enduring" record: "The hard truths behind its cold stare have proved persistent to the point of immovability."

Not all the retrospective reviews have been positive. Q magazine's Richard Williams believed that Nebraska would have been a better record with the E Street Band and "a few more months in the studio". Consequence of Sound's Harry Houser and Bryan Kitching argue that due to its dark and heart-wrenching qualities, the stories were not easy-listening and lacked the ability to be played at parties or bars.

=== Rankings ===
Nebraska has appeared on multiple best-of lists. In 1989, it was ranked 43rd on Rolling Stone magazine's list of the 100 greatest albums of the 1980s. In 2003, it was ranked number 224 on Rolling Stone's list of the 500 greatest albums of all time, 226 in a 2012 revised list, and 150 in a 2020 reboot of the list. In 2006, Q placed the album at number 13 in its list of "40 Best Albums of the '80s". In 2012, Slant Magazine listed the album at number 57 on its list of "Best Albums of the 1980s". The following year, NME ranked it number 148 in their list of the 500 greatest albums of all time. Two years later, Ultimate Classic Rock included it in a list compiling the 100 best rock albums of the 1980s. In 2018, Pitchfork listed it as the 28th greatest album of the 1980s. In a 2022 list compiling the 50 best albums of 1982, Spin placed Nebraska at number 17. In 2024, Paste magazine placed it at number 223 in their list of the 300 greatest albums of all time. The album was also included in the book 1001 Albums You Must Hear Before You Die.

== Legacy ==
=== Later records by Springsteen ===
In the decades following its release, Springsteen has released two albums in a similar stripped-down acoustic style of Nebraska: The Ghost of Tom Joad (1995) and Devils & Dust (2005). With Ghost, Springsteen said that he wanted to "pick up where I'd left off with Nebraska, set the stories in the mid-'90s and in the land of my current residence, California". With Devils, Springsteen felt that his acoustic demos were superior to full-band renditions. Both albums contained downbeat themes, but unlike Nebraska, featured a handful of other musicians accompanying Springsteen on many tracks. A few critics believe that the two albums failed to match the power and consistency of Nebraska. Reflecting on Nebraska, Springsteen described it as his "most personal record": "It felt to me, in its tone, the most what my childhood felt like." Speaking in 2023, Springsteen called it his definitive album.

=== Impact on home recording ===
In the 21st century, Nebraska is regarded as a breakthrough in home recording. At the time of its release, the majority of musical artists, including smaller indie bands, primarily recorded in studios, while home demos were rarely available to the public. Nebraska has been credited as one of the first do it yourself (DIY) records by a major artist and subsequently sparked a DIY revolution. In the decades following its release, numerous artists began recording their own music at home. According to Warren McQuiston of Performer magazine: "The success of Nebraska strictly as a recording project was the 'emperor has no clothes' moment. You could make a record at home, a real one that, and if done right, could be good enough to be released on Columbia Records."

Nebraska further influenced the indie rock and underground music scenes, paving the way for releases by artists such as Ween, Neutral Milk Hotel, Iron & Wine, and Bon Iver. Matt Berninger, lead singer of the National, said: "It wasn't just the fact that it was a magical record in terms of its scenes and characters. It was the idea that a major rock star could make something just in his bedroom. It exploded so many of my received ideas and told me that, maybe I could be a musician." Nebraska is considered an essential home record, (Note: Attributed to multiple references:) the "most celebrated" lo-fi record by The Daily Telegraph's Neil McCormick, and was named the greatest home recording ever made by Paste magazine in 2012.

=== Tributes ===
Numerous artists have paid tribute to Nebraska since its release. Johnny Cash covered "Johnny 99" and "Highway Patrolman" for his 1983 album Johnny 99. A tribute album, Badlands: A Tribute to Bruce Springsteen's Nebraska, was released in 2000. Produced by Jim Sampas, it featured covers of the Nebraska songs recorded in a similar stripped-down spirit of the original recordings by artists including Cash, Hank Williams III, Los Lobos, Dar Williams, Deana Carter, Ani DiFranco, Son Volt, Ben Harper, Aimee Mann, and Michael Penn. The album also included covers of three other Springsteen tracks from the same period: "I'm on Fire", "Downbound Train", and "Wages of Sin".

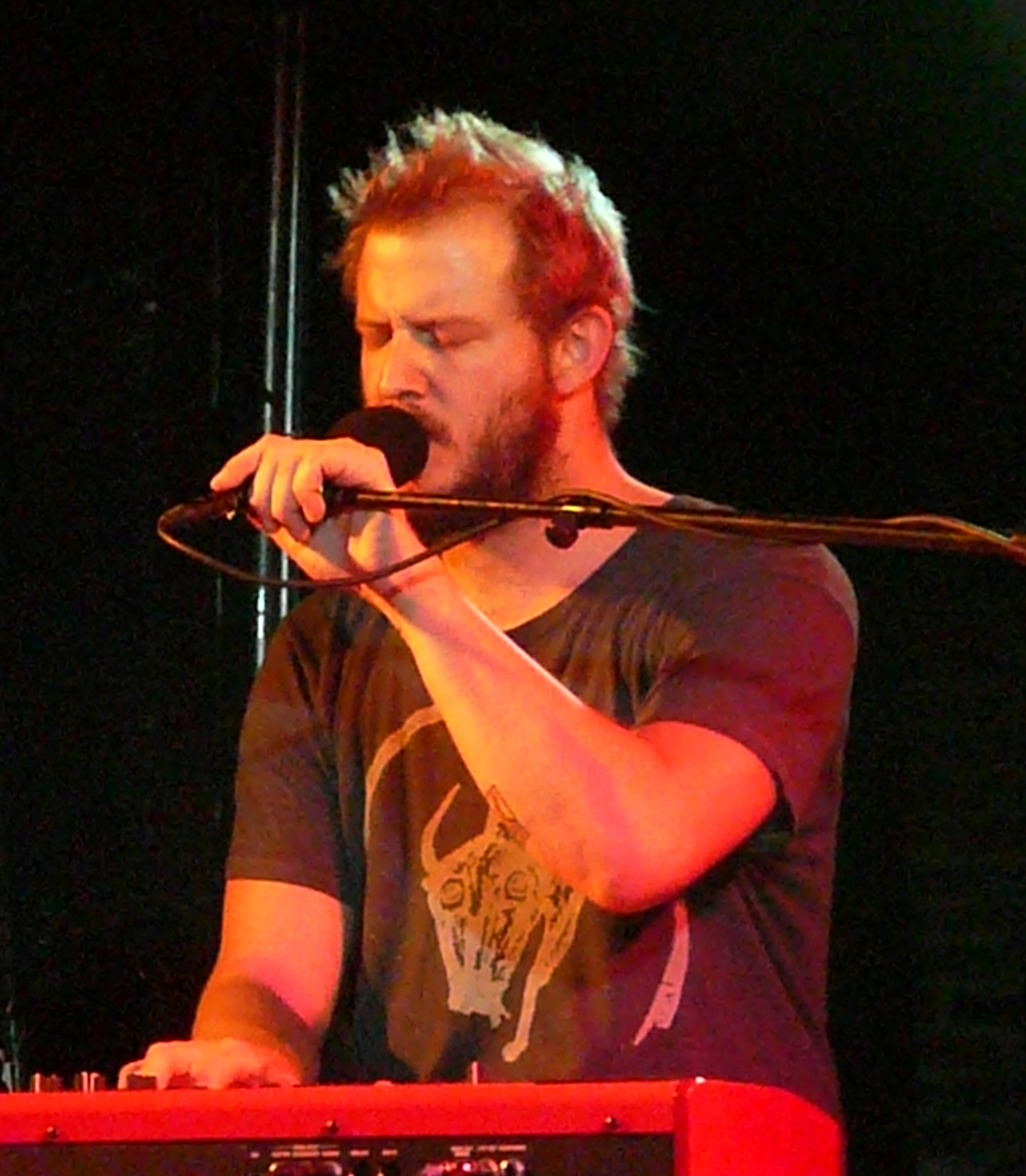
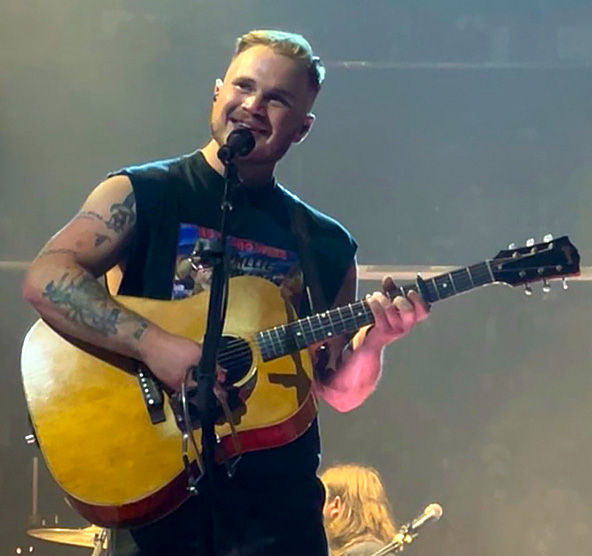
Artists who have cited Nebraska as an influence on their music include Justin Vernon (left, pictured in 2008) and Zach Bryan (right, in 2023).

Other artists have discussed Nebraska's impact on their music. Rage Against the Machine's guitarist Tom Morello said: "I didn't know there was music like that, that was as impactful and as heavy as Nebraska was. The alienation that I felt was for the first time expressed in music, and then I became a huge superfan." The singers Emmylou Harris, (Note: Harris also covered "My Father's House" for her 1986 album Thirteen.) Kelly Clarkson, Justin Vernon, and rock band the Killers cited Nebraska as an influence when making the albums The Ballad of Sally Rose (1985), My December (2007), For Emma, Forever Ago (2007), and Pressure Machine (2021), respectively. The singer-songwriters Aoife O'Donovan and Ryan Adams released full track-by-track covers of Nebraska in 2020 and 2022, respectively. O'Donovan performed the album live in its entirety several times throughout 2023. Zach Bryan named Nebraska as his favorite album ever written and used it as the recording template for his first two albums, DeAnn (2019) and Elisabeth (2020), with an additional nod in the lyrics to the title track of The Great American Bar Scene (2024). Nebraska was also a favorite of Richard Thompson, Rosanne Cash, and Steve Earle.

Outside of music, "Highway Patrolman" provided the inspiration for the 1991 film The Indian Runner. Written and directed by Sean Penn and starring David Morse and Viggo Mortensen, the film follows the same plot outline as the song, telling the story of a troubled relationship between two brothers, a deputy sheriff and a criminal. In literature, the short stories in Tennessee Jones's book Deliver Me from Nowhere (2005) were inspired by the themes of Nebraska. The book takes its title from a line in "Open All Night" and "State Trooper". David Burke's Heart of Darkness: Bruce Springsteen's Nebraska (2011), analyzed the album's influence decades after its release, while another book, Warren Zanes's Deliver Me from Nowhere (2023), delved into the album's making, featuring interviews between Zanes and Springsteen.

== In media ==
=== Springsteen: Deliver Me from Nowhere ===
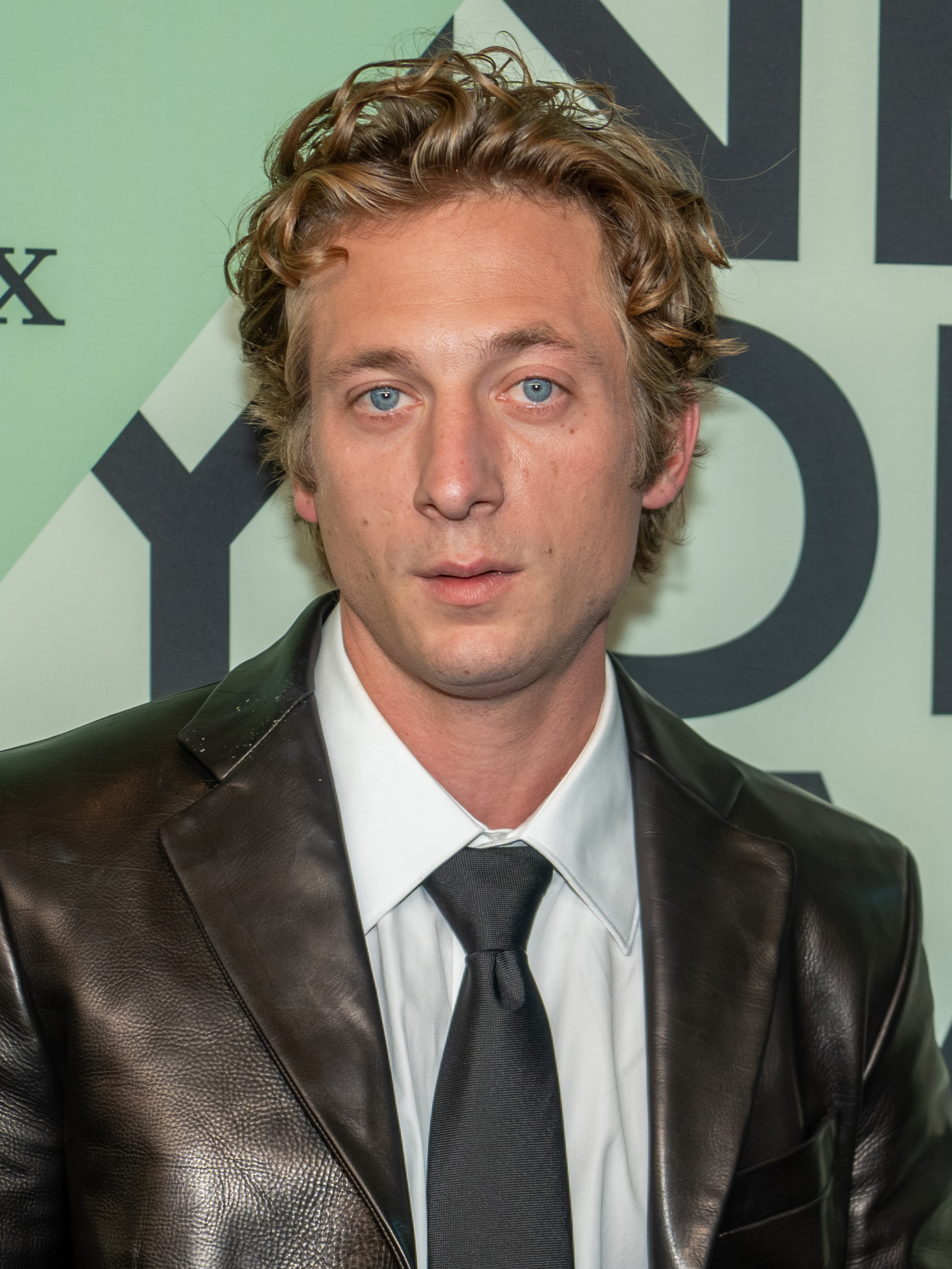
Jeremy Allen White portrays Springsteen in the biopic Springsteen: Deliver Me from Nowhere (2025).

A biographical film based on the making of Nebraska, produced by 20th Century Studios, was released on October 24, 2025. Titled Springsteen: Deliver Me from Nowhere, it was written and directed by Scott Cooper, and is based on Warren Zanes's book Deliver Me from Nowhere (2023). The plot follows Springsteen as he wrote and recorded the Nebraska songs while dealing with the personal struggles of becoming a superstar. The film stars Jeremy Allen White as Springsteen, with Jeremy Strong, Odessa Young, Paul Walter Hauser, Harrison Gilbertson, and Stephen Graham in supporting roles. Springsteen and Jon Landau were both heavily involved in the project. In an interview with NME, Strong named Nebraska as his favorite Springsteen album and spoke about its influence on him: "It just always spoke to me, there's a melancholy to it. I am doing [Deliver Me From Nowhere], but I'd always felt that way about that album. There's a narrative to it that comes from a very deep place in him, and you can feel that." Upon its release, Deliver Me from Nowhere divided film critics, although White's and Strong's performances received some praise.

=== PBS special ===
A television special celebrating Nebraska, titled Bruce Springsteen's Nebraska: A Celebration in Words and Music, aired on PBS on August 31, 2024. The special, hosted by Zanes, was filmed in Nashville on September 19, 2023, and features numerous musicians singing the album's songs, including Emmylou Harris, Noah Kahan and Lucinda Williams. Zanes wrote in a statement announcing the special that "the recording stayed with me over decades. Every time there was trouble in my life I reached for Nebraska. When I started doing events around the book's publication, I quickly realized the best of them had music."

== Reissues ==
Nebraska was released on CD in 1984. This was followed by an LP and CD reissue by CBS in 1988. Additional reissues followed in 2003 by Columbia, and in 2008 by Sony BMG. In 2015, Sony Music released a remastered version of the album on both LP and CD. To mark its 40th anniversary, Sony Music reissued the album in October 2022 on black smoke vinyl. The edition contains an original art print by Justin A. McHugh and a listening notes booklet by Springsteen's biographer Peter Ames Carlin.

=== Nebraska '82: Expanded Edition ===
Professional ratings
Expanded Edition
Aggregate scores
| Source | Rating |
|---|---|
| Metacritic | 85/100 |
Review scores
| Source | Rating |
| Classic Rock | 4.5/5 stars |
| Clash | 8/10 |
| The Guardian | 2/5 stars |
| Pitchfork | 8.8/10 |
| Rolling Stone | 3.5/5 stars |
| Uncut | 5/5 stars |

A deluxe edition, titled Nebraska '82: Expanded Edition, was released on October 24, 2025, to coincide with the release of Springsteen: Deliver Me from Nowhere. Containing five discs, the box set includes a remaster of the Nebraska album, the Electric Nebraska recordings, and various acoustic outtakes, including "Child Bride", "The Losin' Kind", and the never-bootlegged songs "Gun in Every Home" and "On the Prowl". Also featured is a new live performance of Springsteen playing the album in its entirety for the first time, recorded at the Count Basie Theater in Red Bank, New Jersey. In a press release, Springsteen said of the live performance: "I think in playing these songs again to be filmed, their weight impressed upon me. I've written a lot of other narrative records, but there's just something about that batch of songs on 'Nebraska' that holds some sort of magic."

According to the review aggregator Metacritic, the box set received "universal acclaim" based on a weighted average score of 85 out of 100 from 10 critic scores. In a perfect five out of five star rating for Uncut magazine, Peter Watts wrote that the electric recordings affirmed that Springsteen chose the right version of Nebraska to release. He believed that the album would have been "incredible" with some of the electric versions included, "but it wouldn't be Nebraska – a mood, concept and statement". Writing for Pitchfork, Sam Sodomsky stated that the expanded edition "completes the story" of Nebraska, giving listeners insight to why Springsteen chose to release it the way he did. In a more mixed review for The Guardian, Caryn Rose believed the long-awaited electric recordings were a disappointment, considering most of them inferior to the released acoustic ones, ultimately saying Springsteen released the right version at the right time.

== Track listing ==
All tracks are written by Bruce Springsteen.

Side one
| No. | Title | Length |
|---|---|---|
| 1. | "Nebraska" | 4:27 |
| 2. | "Atlantic City" | 3:54 |
| 3. | "Mansion on the Hill" | 4:03 |
| 4. | "Johnny 99" | 3:38 |
| 5. | "Highway Patrolman" | 5:39 |
| 6. | "State Trooper" | 3:15 |

Side two
| No. | Title | Length |
|---|---|---|
| 1. | "Used Cars" | 3:05 |
| 2. | "Open All Night" | 2:55 |
| 3. | "My Father's House" | 5:43 |
| 4. | "Reason to Believe" | 4:09 |
| Total length: | | 41:02 |

== Personnel ==
According to the liner notes and the authors Philippe Margotin and Jean-Michel Guesdon:

- Bruce Springsteen – vocals, guitars; harmonica (1–5, 7, 9–10); mandolin (1–3, 5); glockenspiel (1, 7); synthesizer (9)

Technical

- Mike Batlan – recording engineer
- Dennis King – mastering
- Bob Ludwig, Steve Marcussen – mastering consultants
- Andrea Klein – design
- David Michael Kennedy – photography (copyrighted 1975)

== Charts ==
=== Weekly charts ===
1982 weekly chart performance
| Chart (1982) | Peak position |
|---|---|
| Australian Albums (Kent Music Report) | 8 |
| Canada Top Albums/CDs (RPM) | 3 |
| Dutch Albums (Album Top 100) | 7 |
| French Albums (SNEP) | 18 |
| Japanese Oricon LPs Chart | 10 |
| New Zealand Albums (RMNZ) | 3 |
| Norwegian Albums (VG-lista) | 3 |
| Swedish Albums (Sverigetopplistan) | 2 |
| UK Albums Chart | 3 |
| US Billboard Top LPs & Tapes | 3 |
| West German Media Control Albums (Gfk) | 37 |

2019 weekly chart performance
| Chart (2019) | Position |
|---|---|
| Swiss Albums (Schweizer Hitparade) | 73 |

2025 weekly chart performance
| Chart (2025) | Peak position |
|---|---|
| Australian Albums (ARIA) | 21 |
| Austrian Albums (Ö3 Austria) | 4 |
| Belgian Albums (Ultratop Flanders) | 3 |
| Belgian Albums (Ultratop Wallonia) | 3 |
| Canadian Albums (Billboard) | 86 |
| Croatian International Albums (HDU) | 16 |
| Danish Albums (Hitlisten) | 17 |
| Dutch Albums (Album Top 100) | 3 |
| Finnish Albums (Suomen virallinen lista) | 16 |
| French Albums (SNEP) | 21 |
| French Rock & Metal Albums (SNEP) | 1 |
| German Albums (Offizielle Top 100) | 3 |
| German Rock & Metal Albums (Offizielle Top 100) | 1 |
| Greek Albums (IFPI) | 60 |
| Italian Albums (FIMI) | 4 |
| Irish Albums (Official Charts) | 35 |
| Japanese Albums (Oricon) | 31 |
| Japanese Rock Albums (Oricon) | 6 |
| Japanese Top Albums Sales (Billboard Japan) | 32 |
| New Zealand Albums (RMNZ) | 28 |
| Portuguese Albums (AFP) | 100 |
| Scottish Albums (Official Charts) | 4 |
| Spanish Albums (PROMUSICAE) | 1 |
| Swiss Albums (Schweizer Hitparade) | 3 |
| UK Albums (Official Charts) | 14 |
| UK Americana Albums (Official Charts) | 1 |
| US Billboard 200 | 26 |
| US Americana/Folk Albums (Billboard) | 3 |
| US Top Rock & Alternative Albums (Billboard) | 6 |

=== Year-end charts ===
Year-end chart performance
| Chart (1982) | Position |
|---|---|
| Canadian Albums (RPM) | 32 |
| UK Albums Chart | 88 |

== Certifications ==
Sales certifications
| Region | Certification | Certified units/sales |
|---|---|---|
| Australia (ARIA) | Platinum | 70,000^{^} |
| Canada (Music Canada) | Gold | 50,000^{^} |
| United Kingdom (BPI) | Gold | 100,000^{^} |
| United States (RIAA) | Platinum | 1,000,000^{^} |
^{^} Shipments figures based on certification alone.

== See also ==
- List of 1980s albums considered the best
