= Johnny 99 =

1983 album by Johnny Cash

Studio album by Johnny Cash
- Released: August 29, 1983
- Recorded: April 1983
- Studio: Magnolia (Hollywood)
- Genre: Country
- Length: 35:05
- Label: Columbia
- Producer: Brian Ahern

Johnny Cash chronology
The Adventures of Johnny Cash (1982)	Johnny 99 (1983)	Koncert V Praze (In Prague–Live) (1983)

Singles from Johnny 99
- 1. "I'm Ragged but I'm Right" Released: August 1983; 2. "Johnny 99" Released: November 1983; 3. "That's the Truth" Released: April 1984

Professional ratings
Review scores
Source	Rating
AllMusic	4/5 stars

Johnny 99 is the 69th album by American country singer Johnny Cash, released on Columbia Records in 1983. It is notable for including two covers of Bruce Springsteen songs from Springsteen's 1982 album Nebraska, "Highway Patrolman" and "Johnny 99." "I'm Ragged but I'm Right," a George Jones song, was a minor hit, reaching No. 75.

== Track listing ==
No.	Title	Writer(s)	Length
1.	"Highway Patrolman"	Bruce Springsteen	5:17
2.	"That's the Truth"	Paul Kennerley	2:41
3.	"God Bless Robert E. Lee"	Bobby Borchers, Mack Vickery	3:40
4.	"New Cut Road"	Guy Clark	3:30
5.	"Johnny 99"	Bruce Springsteen	3:33
6.	"Ballad of the Ark"	Steven Rhymer	2:52
7.	"Joshua Gone Barbados"	Eric Von Schmidt	5:04
8.	"Girl from the Canyon"	Carolina Edwards, Jonathan Edwards	2:35
9.	"Brand New Dance" (with June Carter Cash)	Paul Kennerley	3:21
10.	"I'm Ragged but I'm Right"	George Jones	2:32

== Personnel ==
- Johnny Cash – vocals, acoustic guitar
- James Burton – electric guitar
- Bob Wootton – electric guitar
- Jerry Scheff – bass guitar
- Hal Blaine – drums
- Glen D. Hardin – keyboards
- Brian Ahern – gut-string guitar, 6-string bass, tambourine, arrangements
- Tim Goodman – electric guitar, acoustic guitar, slide guitar, 6-string bass, banjo
- Nick DeCaro – accordion
- Jo-El Sonnier – accordion
- David Mansfield – mandolin, mandocello, fiddle
- Marty Stuart – electric and acoustic guitar, mandolin
- Norton Buffalo – harmonica
- Hoyt Axton, Barbara Bennett, Donivan Cowart, Lynn Langham – vocals
- June Carter – vocals on "Brand New Dance"

Technical

- Jack Grochmal, Donivan Cowart, Brian Ahern – engineer
- John Seakwood – photography

== Charts ==
Singles – Billboard (United States)

Year	Single	Chart	Position
1983	"I'm Ragged but I'm Right"	Country Singles	75
