= The Chicken in Black =

Song by Johnny Cash

Single by Johnny Cash
- B-side: "Battle of Nashville"
- Released: 1984
- Genre: Country
- Label: Columbia Bros. 38-04513
- Songwriter: Gary Gentry
- Producer: Billy Sherrill

Johnny Cash singles chronology
"That's the Truth" (1984)	"The Chicken in Black" (1984)	"They Killed Him" (1984)

Music video
- "The Chicken in Black" on YouTube

"The Chicken in Black" is a novelty song written by Gary Gentry and originally recorded by Johnny Cash.

Released as a single in 1984 (Columbia 38-04513, with "Battle of Nashville" on the opposite side), the song reached number 45 on U.S. Billboard's country chart.

Cash was initially optimistic and pleased with the recording. However, his enthusiasm quickly faded. In his second autobiography, he described the song as "intentionally atrocious" after friends and family reacted poorly to the single and its accompanying video. Waylon Jennings told him he looked like a buffoon in the chicken costume, while his daughter, Rosanne Cash called the song the "nadir of his 1980s decline."

Cash later admitted that "The Chicken in Black" was the only thing he ever recorded that he "flat-out hated". Reflecting on the video, he called it "godawful." According to Wide Open Country, the song came to represent what critics and fans widely view as the lowest point of his 1980s output.

== Lyrics ==
A humorous story song, the lyrics relate how Cash visits his doctor due to persistent headaches and is told that his body has "outlived [his] brain". The doctor refers him to another doctor in New York City, who performs a brain transplant on Cash, replacing his brain with that of a dead bank robber. When Cash visits a bank, however, his new brain compels him to rob it, and when he performs at the Grand Ole Opry some time later, he robs the audience of their valuables. He calls his doctor and demands his old brain back, but the doctor informs him that it has been transplanted into a chicken. The song ends with Cash warning his friends that if they meet him he might rob them and noting that if they have ten dollars to spare they "ought to catch that Johnny Chicken Show".

== Track listing ==
7" single (Columbia 38-04513, 1984)
No.	Title	Writer(s)	Length
1.	"The Chicken in Black"	G. Gentry	2:58
2.	"Battle of Nashville"	J. R. Cash	3:17

== Charts ==
Chart (1984)	Peak position
US Hot Country Songs (Billboard)	45
