= Atlantic City (song) =

1982 single by Bruce Springsteen

Single by Bruce Springsteen

from the album Nebraska
- B-side: "Mansion on the Hill"
- Released: October 1982
- Recorded: January 3, 1982
- Studio: Thrill Hill East, Colts Neck, New Jersey
- Genre: Folk rock
- Length: 4:00
- Label: Columbia (album); CBS 2794 (UK single)
- Songwriter: Bruce Springsteen
- Producer: Bruce Springsteen

Bruce Springsteen UK singles chronology
"Point Blank" (1981)	"Atlantic City" (1982)	"Open All Night" (1982)

Music video
- "Atlantic City" on YouTube

"Atlantic City" is a song written and recorded by Bruce Springsteen, which first appeared on his 1982 solo album Nebraska. He has often played the song in a full band arrangement in concert.

== Recording background ==
Springsteen wrote in his Greatest Hits sleeve notes that he recorded "Atlantic City" in his bedroom "for $1,050 (the cost of the four-track Tascam recorder), mixed through an old Gibson guitar unit to a beat box". He provides the vocals, guitar, harmonica, and mandolin for the song.

Springsteen first recorded two demos of the song in April 1981 at his home in Colts Neck, New Jersey. Initially he titled the song "Fistful of Dollars" (after the Clint Eastwood movie A Fistful of Dollars). He recorded another demo in late 1981, this time changing the title to "Atlantic City". He recorded at least five takes on his Portastudio at Colts Neck during a two-week period, December 17, 1981, to January 3, 1982. The third take would be chosen for Nebraska. In a letter to Jon Landau, Springsteen noted that "this song should probably be done with the whole band really rockin' out". Springsteen spent three days trying to make a rock record out of the demo during the Electric Nebraska sessions with the E Street Band at the Power Station from April 26 to 28, 1982. Landau insisted on releasing the solo version: "No way was it as good as what he had goin' on that demo tape".

== Historical context and lyrical significance ==
The lyrics of "Atlantic City" concern a young couple's escape to Atlantic City, New Jersey, but the song also wrestles with rebirth and the inevitability of death. The man in the relationship intends to take a job in organized crime upon arriving in Atlantic City, due at least partly to desperation over his "debts".

The song's opening lines refer to the March 1981 killing of Philadelphia crime family boss Phil "The Chicken Man" Testa by a rival gangster who planted a nail bomb in his Philadelphia rowhouse: "Well, they blew up The Chicken Man in Philly last night / Now they blew up his house too".

While Atlantic City is considered the turf of the Philadelphia crime family, there was considerable in-fighting at the time among the Italian-American Mafia for dominance of the organized crime rackets in the city following the city's proposed legalization of gambling in 1976.

By the 1970s and early 1980s, Atlantic City experienced a significant decline from its heyday as a prominent resort town in the early 20th century, and the introduction of legal gambling was proposed as a potential means of reviving the economically struggling city. The song evokes the widespread uncertainty regarding legalized gambling during its early years in Atlantic City and its promises to resurrect the city. The young man's uncertainty about taking the less-than-savory job is referenced in the lyric, "Everything dies, baby, that's a fact, but maybe everything that dies someday comes back."

The song is included on Springsteen's Greatest Hits album, released in 1995, and on The Essential Bruce Springsteen, released in 2003.

=== In popular culture ===
"Atlantic City" was used in "8 Years", a 2006 episode of the police procedural Cold Case, along with eight other Springsteen songs.

In 2012, following Hurricane Sandy, New Jersey Governor Chris Christie quoted the song's chorus during a cameo on Saturday Night Live.

The song plays over the opening of "Chickentown", a 2019 episode of Billions, and a few scenes later, the character "Dollar" Bill Stern (Kelly AuCoin) sings its opening lines.

In September 2021, Rolling Stone ranked the song 289th on its list of the "500 Best Songs of All Time".

== Music video ==
The music video for "Atlantic City" was directed by Barry Ralbag. It received moderate play on MTV in the United States. Springsteen does not appear in the video, which features stark, black-and-white images of Atlantic City. The video also includes clips of the January 1979 demolition of the main dome of the Marlborough-Blenheim Hotel.

== Live performances ==
Beginning with the Born in the U.S.A. Tour, "Atlantic City" has made fairly regular appearances in Springsteen's band concerts, with a soft-hard-cycle arrangement similar to that of "Darkness on the Edge of Town". Live versions of "Atlantic City" appear on Springsteen's In Concert/MTV Plugged, released in 1993, and Bruce Springsteen & The E Street Band: Live in New York City, released in 2001.

For the 2006 Bruce Springsteen with the Seeger Sessions Band Tour, "Atlantic City" was drastically rearranged, featuring multiple outros. One of these versions appears on Bruce Springsteen with The Sessions Band: Live in Dublin, released in 2007.

In July 2025, Springsteen made a surprise appearance at Zach Bryan's concert in Metlife Stadium, where he sang Atlantic City together with Bryan and Kings of Leon

== Personnel ==
- Bruce Springsteen, vocals, guitar, harmonica, mandolin

== Other versions ==
- In 1993, The Band covered the song for their album Jericho. Rolling Stone called it a "clear highlight". After the Band split up, Levon Helm continued to play "Atlantic City" in his solo performances.
- In 1997, American singer-songwriter Kim Fox recorded the song for her album Moon Hut.
- In 2001, country singer John Anderson recorded the song for his album Nobody's Got It All.
- In 2002, Hank Williams III covered the song on his album Lovesick, Broke and Driftin'.
- In 2009, The Hold Steady covered the song for the charity album War Child Presents Heroes.
- In 2010, English singer-songwriter Jamie T released a cover of the song as a B-side to his single "Emily's Heart".
- In 2010, American singer-songwriter Justin Townes Earle covered the song for the first season of The A.V. Club's A.V. Undercover web series.
- In 2012, British folk rock band Mumford & Sons covered the song for a Daytrotter session.
- In 2017, Jason Isbell and the 400 Unit covered the song on their album Live from Welcome to 1979.
- In 2018, Sam Fender covered the song for YouTube.
- In 2018, country artist Riley Green covered the song on his EP County Line. He also covered the song on his 2024 EP Way Out Here.
- In 2019, Greensky Bluegrass performed the song live.
- In 2021, St. Louis-based folk duo River Kittens recorded the song and released an accompanying video.
- In 2022, Ryan Adams released a cover album of Nebraska, which includes "Atlantic City".
- On June 25, 2022, Goose performed a cover at Radio City Music Hall (https://www.youtube.com/watch?v=ABdHkzgI9WQ).
- In 2024, Boyish covered the song on their EP We're All Gonna Die, But Here Are Some Covers.
- In 2024, O.A.R. covered the song on their album Live in Boston.
