= Kim Fox (musician) =

American singer and songwriter

- Born: 1968 (age 57–58); Manhattan, New York
- Origin: New York City
- Genres: Modern adult contemporary, pop rock
- Instrument: Keyboards
- Years active: 1997-present
- Labels: DreamWorks, Franklin Castle

Kim Fox (born 1968 in Manhattan, New York) is an American singer, songwriter, and keyboardist based in New York City.

== Biography ==
Fox is the daughter of doo-wop singer Norman Fox, known for his band Norman Fox & The Rob-Roys. She attended Vassar College, where she majored in music composition and theory. While in college, she hoped to become an opera singer, but after seeing a performance by Suddenly, Tammy!, she decided to become a pop musician. She met producer Paul Mahern through a publishing deal with Bertelsmann Music Group; Mahern subsequently recorded her early demo tracks. She decided to move to Mahern's hometown of Bloomington, Indiana because she was taken with the city, and with Mahern's producing style.

Her debut album, Moon Hut, was released on September 9, 1997 on DreamWorks Records. The album was produced by Mahern and arranged by Mark Bingham. The first single from the album was "I Wanna Be a Witch", which was released to adult album alternative radio in late August 1997. Prior to the single's release, WXPN's Bruce Warren said that his station planned to put the single in heavy rotation once it was released. The album's second single, "Sweetest Revenge," was released in 1998.

All of the musicians who performed on Moon Hut lived in Bloomington at the time of recording. The album received positive reviews from critics, but was commercially unsuccessful, which prompted Fox to back out of her contract with DreamWorks. She subsequently moved to Los Angeles in 1998, and released her second album, Return to Planet Earth, in 2003 through Franklin Castle Recordings.

Since 2005, she has worked as a professional photographer. During the late 2010s, Fox began working on new music, and is planning to release a third studio album.

== Musical style ==
A 1997 review of "I Wanna Be A Witch" in Billboard described Fox as "a formidable young artist with a knack for combining irony and humor with acoustic-rock-rooted melodies that have a subtle Tin Pan Alley feel." Allmusic labelled her as being "natural for those who crave a certain level of intelligence with their pop hooks."

== Discography ==
- Moon Hut (DreamWorks, 1997)
- Return to Planet Earth (Oglio/Franklin Castle, 2003)
