= The Indian Runner =

1991 film directed by Sean Penn

- Theatrical release poster
- Directed by: Sean Penn
- Written by: Sean Penn
- Based on: "Highway Patrolman" by Bruce Springsteen
- Produced by: Don Phillips
- Starring: David Morse; Viggo Mortensen; Valeria Golino; Patricia Arquette; Jordan Rhodes; Dennis Hopper; Sandy Dennis; Charles Bronson
- Cinematography: Anthony B. Richmond
- Edited by: Jay Cassidy
- Music by: Jack Nitzsche; David Lindley
- Distributed by: Metro-Goldwyn-Mayer (North America); Columbia Tri-Star Film Distributors International (International)
- Release date: September 20, 1991
- Running time: 128 minutes
- Countries: United States
- Language: English
- Budget: $7 million
- Box office: $191,125

The Indian Runner is a 1991 American crime drama film written and directed by Sean Penn in his directorial debut. Based on Bruce Springsteen's song "Highway Patrolman", the film stars David Morse and Viggo Mortensen as brothers who find themselves on opposite sides of the law. The cast also features Valeria Golino, Patricia Arquette, Dennis Hopper, Charles Bronson, and Sandy Dennis in her final film role.

== Plot ==
In mid-1960s Cass County, Nebraska, Joe and Frank Roberts are two brothers with very different lives.

Before the events of the film, Joe had tried to farm for a living, but was unable to make ends meet, and the bank eventually foreclosed on his property. He became a deputy sheriff as a way to support his young wife, Maria, and child. Joe is a good, conscientious man, but has his own demons to fight with, feeling conflicted by killing in the line of duty. Meanwhile, Frank, who had been involved with run-ins with the law before going to Vietnam, is described by his father as plagued by "restlessness".

Upon his return to town, Frank breaks into his brother's home and is nearly shot by Joe's wife. The next day, Frank leaves town without ever stopping by his parents' home. As Joe states in the narration, Frank was correct in his assessment that his parents would understand, as they always seem to when he hurts those who love him.

Joe does not hear from his brother for some time, but eventually discovers from their father that he is in jail in another state. He had kept the information quiet to avoid upsetting their mother. Frank is then released from custody and returns to his hometown with his pregnant girlfriend, Dorothy. Joe's and Frank's mother dies and their father dies by suicide soon after.

Frank tries to settle down and works in construction, but keeps getting into trouble with the law, which puts him in conflict with Joe. When the time comes for Frank's wife to give birth, Frank is in a bar "drinking it down," which sparks a confrontation with Joe. After Joe leaves, Frank beats the bartender to death with a chair and drives out of town with Joe on his tail. The film concludes with Joe allowing Frank to escape across the state line.

== Cast ==
- David Morse as Joe Roberts
  - Trevor Endicott as 12-year-old Joe
- Viggo Mortensen as Frank Roberts
  - Brandon Fleck as 7-year-old Frank
- Valeria Golino as Maria Roberts
- Patricia Arquette as Dorothy
- Charles Bronson as Mr. Roberts
- Sandy Dennis as Mrs. Roberts
- Dennis Hopper as Caesar
- Jordan Rhodes as Randall

Additional cast members include Benicio del Toro as Miguel and Harry Crews and Eileen Ryan as the Bakers. Enzo Rossi, Patricia Arquette's son, plays Rafael.

== Production ==
The film was shot partially in Plattsmouth, Nebraska, Ralston, Nebraska, and Omaha, Nebraska.

Producer Don Phillips gave Penn's screenplay to two producers, who liked it but felt that the ending was not commercial enough to interest a Hollywood studio. Phillips' friend Thom Mount, who had his own production company and was a big fan of Penn's work, thought that they might interest a studio if they could get a movie star like Tom Cruise interested in appearing in the film. Penn spotted Mortensen in the film Fresh Horses and was drawn to the actor's "angularity, a severity to his handsomeness," that he thought would be perfect for the role of Frank.

Penn and Phillips sent Mortensen the script while he was making Young Guns II in Tucson, Arizona and flew there to meet with him. The actor agreed to star in Penn's film. Penn had Morse and Mortensen rehearse their pivotal scene in a bar for two weeks. The director had a bar set up in a gymnasium which allowed the actors to blow off steam by shooting baskets in between rehearsals. While making the film, Penn felt that Mortensen's "inherent kindness" was too visible and had him work with a member of the Hells Angels motorcycle club that the director knew in order to acquire an edginess that Penn felt necessary for the character.

The Indian Runner is the last film to feature Sandy Dennis, who died six months after it was released to cinemas. Viggo Mortensen said in an interview several years after her death that during post-production, Sean Penn cut a scene in which she had eight pages of dialogue. In the long scene, Joe and Frank visit their terminally ill mother and their father. Penn decided he could improve the movie if Frank seems cold enough to avoid visiting her even though she is dying, and cut the scene. Dennis appears in a short scene in which she and her husband, played by Charles Bronson, are visited by Joe only. Quoting Mortensen directly about Dennis,

"She was working on a level far above the rest of us. The concentration and vulnerability that she invested in the scene were remarkable. Heart-breaking. The fact that most of us knew that she was dying of ovarian cancer as she showed us the emotional disintegration of the character made the experience all the more poignant. I will always remember the three days we spent working on that ambitious scene: the sense of family, the pride in acting with her, the undercurrent of loss. She left Omaha and her native Nebraska, returning to New York the day after completing her job with us. That was the last time I saw her.”

Future US political strategist Steve Bannon was an executive producer.

== Reception ==
=== Critical response ===
The Indian Runner was, for the most part, positively received. It has a 'fresh' rating of 76% on Rotten Tomatoes from 17 reviews. Roger Ebert of the Chicago Sun-Times gave the film a positive review, writing that Joe and Frank represent not only the two sides of manhood in society, but also, possibly, the two sides of Sean Penn's own character.
