= Bobby Jean =

Song by Bruce Springsteen

from the album Born in the U.S.A.
- Released: June 4, 1984
- Recorded: July 28 & Oct 10, 1983
- Studio: Hit Factory, New York City
- Genre: Rock and roll
- Length: 3:46
- Label: Columbia
- Songwriter: Bruce Springsteen
- Producers: Jon Landau; Bruce Springsteen; Steven Van Zandt

"Bobby Jean" is a song written and performed by the American singer-songwriter Bruce Springsteen, from his 1984 album Born in the U.S.A. Although not released as a single, it reached number 36 on the Billboard Mainstream Rock Tracks chart.

== History ==
"Bobby Jean" was one of the last songs from the album to be recorded, and was considered a musical breakthrough for Springsteen during the recording, with its more accented rhythm and near dance groove.

The title character's name is somewhat gender ambiguous, allowing for various interpretations. Nonetheless, "Bobby Jean" is often considered to have been written about his long-time friendship with Steve Van Zandt, who was leaving the E Street Band at the time: for example, Swedish journalist Richard Ohlsson made the interpretation in his book Bruce Springsteen: 16 Album that the title contained both a male and a female name because "the friendship with Bobby Jean is so strong that it's almost a kind of love." When this song is played live with the E Street Band, close ups of Van Zandt are often shown on the bigscreens.

Now you hung with me, when all the others turned away ... turned up their nose
We liked the same music — we liked the same bands — we liked the same clothes
We told each other, that we were the wildest, the wildest things we'd ever seen ...

The lyric turns to deeper emotions, which Springsteen biographer Dave Marsh characterized as "lines that mingle love, grief, and rancor", with the chorus summing:

Now I wished you would have told me —
I wished I could have talked to you —
Just to say goodbye, Bobby Jean ...

At the conclusion, Springsteen imagines the song's subject hearing the very song in a motel room, as Roy Bittan's piano riff that drives the song yields to a saxophone coda from Clarence Clemons and the recording fades out. Marsh suggests that Springsteen was not singing a farewell just to Van Zandt, but also to his own depressed Nebraska self. Nevertheless, use of minor to major altered chord in the last parts of the chorus lend the song a spirit of generosity.

== Live performances ==
The song has become one of Bruce Springsteen's more popular concert staples, with over 700 performances through 2024.

During the 1984-85 Born in the U.S.A. Tour, "Bobby Jean" would frequently appear during the second set of the shows with a loud audience response. During the 1988 Tunnel of Love Express, the song appeared during the European leg. Making occasional appearances on the 1992-93 "Other Band" Tour, Bobby Jean lost its coda saxophone solo in favor of Springsteen’s vocal wailing. "Bobby Jean" appeared on the Ghost of Tom Joad Tour, where the song was turned into a four-minute acoustic guitar and harmonica performance. The full band version reappeared on the Reunion Tour and The Rising Tour.

By the Devils & Dust Tour, the acoustic version had returned. On the Sessions Band Tour, "Bobby Jean" appeared again in its acoustic form with additional big-band folk instrumentation. On subsequent E Street tours, starting with the Magic Tour and Working on a Dream Tour, "Bobby Jean" has appeared in its full band arrangement, usually being placed in the encores. Springsteen performed the song with Phish during their closing set at the 2009 Bonnaroo Music Festival. In 2010 a live version of the song appeared on the live DVD London Calling: Live in Hyde Park. The song was used frequently as the closer of the show on the 2016 River Tour.

Eddie Vedder from Pearl Jam made a surprise appearance on March 24, 2016 in Seattle when he joined Springsteen and the band for "Bobby Jean."

"Bobby Jean" has appeared throughout the Springsteen and E Street Band 2023-2025 Tour in the encores, usually alternating with Glory Days.

== Personnel ==
According to authors Philippe Margotin and Jean-Michel Guesdon:

- Bruce Springsteen – vocals, guitars
- Roy Bittan – synthesizer, piano
- Clarence Clemons – saxophone, tambourine
- Danny Federici – glockenspiel
- Garry Tallent – bass
- Max Weinberg – drums

== Covers ==
"Bobby Jean" was covered by Portastatic on their 2003 Autumn Was a Lark album.

"Bobby Jean" was covered by Buford Pope for the 2016 tribute album Keep On Dreaming (Tribute to Bruce Springsteen).

"Bobby Jean" was covered by CarterTown for their 2022 EP Bruce Synthsteen.

== In popular culture ==
In Hirohiko Araki's popular manga series, JoJo's Bizarre Adventure Part 9: The JoJoLands, Investigator Bobby Jean is the name of one of the supporting characters.
