= My Father's House (song) =

Song by Bruce Springsteen

from the album Nebraska
- Released: September 30, 1982
- Recorded: May 25, 1982
- Length: 5:08
- Label: Columbia
- Songwriter: Bruce Springsteen
- Producer: Bruce Springsteen

"My Father's House" is a song written and recorded by rock musician Bruce Springsteen, released on Springsteen's 1982 solo album Nebraska.

== Themes ==
"My Father's House" tells the story of a man who, in a dream one night, remembers being comforted by his father as a boy. The next day, he resolves to visit his father, from whom he has become estranged, and attempt to reconcile. When he arrives at his father's house, he discovers that it is too late: his father no longer lives there, and a stranger occupies the house. The narrator is left with no way to contact his father, and he cannot even know if his father is still alive.

Like much of the Nebraska album, "My Father's House" is a downbeat song with an unhappy, despairing narrator.

== History ==
Springsteen recorded the Nebraska album in his home in January 1982.

Springsteen had a troubled relationship with his father. Before a 1990 live performance of the song, he told his audience how he used to regularly drive by his father's former house in Freehold Borough, New Jersey at night, without knowing why, after his father had moved to California. His psychiatrist suggested that Springsteen was trying to right past wrongs, and then told him, "Well, you can't."

Emmylou Harris and Ben Harper recorded the song in 1986 and 2000, respectively.

== Personnel ==
According to authors Philippe Margotin and Jean-Michel Guesdon:

- Bruce Springsteen – vocals, guitar, harmonica
