= David Michael Kennedy =

American photographer

- Born: August 16, 1950 (age 75); United States
- Occupation: Photographer
- Children: Tymara Kennedy, Jesse William Kennedy

David Michael Kennedy (born August 16, 1950) is a photographer living and working in New Mexico. His career spans more than 50 years and includes an 18-year stint in New York City where he was known as a specialist in photography for the advertising and music industries, producing album covers and editorial spreads for artists that include Muddy Waters, Bruce Springsteen, Loverboy, Blondie and Bob Dylan. Although he has won numerous awards for his photography, he stated in early 2010 that he had not entered competitions since 1992.

In 1986 Kennedy moved to northern New Mexico and began documenting the Western landscape and Native American culture, and became involved in Native American causes. His photographs of Native Americans and their culture have been exhibited worldwide, William Zimmer writes that "the respectful Indian pictures bring to light aspects of [Native American] culture that are often hidden". Kennedy's works are held in many private and museum collections, including The National Portrait Gallery, The Smithsonian Institution, The New Mexico History Museum, The Wittliff Collections, The Southwestern & Mexican Photography Collection of Texas State University and The Harwood Museum of Taos, NM.
