= Moon Hut =

Studio album by Kim Fox
- Released: September 9, 1997
- Recorded: Bloomington, Indiana
- Genre: Alternative rock
- Length: 49:41
- Label: DreamWorks
- Producer: Paul Mahern

Kim Fox chronology
Moon Hut (1997)	Return to Planet Earth (2003)

Singles from Moon Hut
- 1. "I Wanna Be a Witch" Released: August 1997; 2. "Sweetest Revenge" Released: January 1998

Moon Hut is the debut studio album by American singer-songwriter Kim Fox, released in 1997 by DreamWorks Records. It spawned two singles: "I Wanna Be a Witch", and "Sweetest Revenge".

== Background ==
Fox grew up in the New York City area, later moving to Bloomington, Indiana, where Moon Hut was recorded. All musicians featured on the album were native to Bloomington, with producer Paul Mahern also originating from the city. She told Billboard in 1997, "the combination of music school musos and the locals makes Bloomington a pretty amazing place. You can see great music about every night. And the atmosphere is so relaxed. Living here, I've gained a new respect for music with a real simplicity."

== Music and recording ==
On the album, Fox was influenced by musical theater, as well as singer-songwriter and indie artists such as Liz Phair and Helium. It incorporates orchestral elements, including on the song "Bleed a Little Allison". The orchestral sound was inspired by the singer-songwriter Cindy Lee Berryhill, who Fox had seen live while in New York. For the album, Fox performed on piano, organ, vibraphone, glockenspiel, mellotron, concertina and acoustic guitar, and wrote all the string arrangements. The record was originally meant to have drumming from well-known session musicians such as Kenny Arnoff, with the drums done in Bloomington intended to be demo tracks for which the final drum tracks would be based on. However, Fox and Mahern decided to keep some of the original drum tracks since they were fans of the energy and vibe of them.

When the record was being made, Fox was in a relationship with Paul Mahern. Fox later recalled that, "a lot of the songs on there, when we recorded them, it would just be like him and I alone in the studio and it was very romantic and creative." Fox has labelled "Cowgirl's Lament" as her favorite track on the album. It was recorded during a thunderstorm in Bloomington, with these sounds being captured within the song itself.

The song "Jen" was written about a longtime friend of Fox, who said in 1998, "Jen, who hates being called Jen (which I do in the song for artistic license), has been a friend of mine since we were three. She is a very sensual, sexual person. She's an artist and a sculptor and a puppeteer. I wrote this song about her at a time when I was feeling really repressed. I looked at her as being someone who was free with her body and free in expression. At that time, I felt like I wasn't, so it was inspiring for me to break free and learn from her. A lot of people do take it as being either that I'm singing about a woman that I'm very attracted to or that it has more sexual connotations, which is perfectly fine. Why can't I admire another woman for being sensual and beautiful?".

== Release and promotion ==
It was originally scheduled to be released by DreamWorks on July 15, 1997, although it would end up being released on September 9, 1997. Shortly before the album's release, Fox performed at the inaugural edition of Lilith Fair, a festival centered around female artists. Fox has said that she felt starstruck since she was a fan of many of the artists who were performing at the event, including Beth Orton and Victoria Williams. Following the release of Moon Hut, Fox opened for Ben Folds Five during late 1997. In September 1998, she contributed a song called "The Murderess" to the DreamWorks compilation Songs of the Witchblade. The compilation was for the Image Comics series Witchblade.

In 2021, Geffen Records released the album to Spotify and other streaming services for the first time. Prior to this, only Fox's second independent album Return to Planet Earth had been available on streaming services. This was since the rights to Moon Hut remained with DreamWorks Records, who were absorbed into Geffen after folding in 2004.

== Reception ==
Professional ratings
Review scores
Source	Rating
AllMusic	4/5 stars
Houston Press	4/5 stars
Stereo Review	3/5 stars

It received a generally positive response from critics. Moon Hut received 4 stars out of 5 from AllMusic's Tom Schulte, who wrote that "potent lyrics and the bright decoration of glockenspiel, concertina and more makes Moon Hut an unforgettable album." Stereo Review gave the album 3 stars out of 5 in January 1998. They said that it suffered from too many midtempo numbers, but praised the "catchy piano-based balladry" and Fox's vocals, saying "Fox has a sweet voice, but she's believable when singing, 'All yesterday I imagined that I was a whore / Parading around in garters and hot pink pumps.'" Houston Press's Hobart Rowland gave it 4 out of 5 stars, describing it as "one of the most satisfying debuts of the year". In September 1998, the New York Daily News categorized her as being part of a group of more lighthearted female singer-songwriters, alongside Jill Sobule and Amy Rigby. In January 1998, the publication also named the album one of the most overlooked CDs of 1997, with writer Jim Farber commenting, "If Fox lacks the bite of Sobule, or the smarts of Rigby, she bests them all in sheer vulnerability. Her self-deprecation couldn't seem more sweet." In May 1998, the Gavin Report named the single "Sweetest Revenge" as "one of the most intelligently written breakup/makeup songs we've heard." In 1997, Billboard described the album as having a "charming mix of innocence and sophistication". They also said her "knack for combining humor with irony" differentiated her from other "hyper sensitive" female singer-songwriters like Fiona Apple and Sarah McLachlan. Robert Christgau, however, was less favorable, giving the album a "neither" rating, indicating that, according to him, it "may impress once or twice with consistent craft or an arresting track or two. Then it won't."

Monica Kendrick of the Chicago Reader gave the album a negative review in October 1997, writing "[it] finds her posing as a whip-smart Morissette-ette and sounding like a second-rate sex kitten. She's breathy and squeaky as a cracked piccolo, and the unbelievably cloying string-and-piano arrangements must be to hedge her bets with the adult-contemporary crowd. I cannot begin to describe how awful this record is; if the fact that she's sampled Ituri forest Pygmies for her baby-voiced cover of Springsteen's "Atlantic City" doesn't convince you, I am powerless."

== Track listing ==
No.	Title	Length
1.	"I Wanna Be a Witch"	3:21
2.	"Found a Penny"	4:12
3.	"Could Have Been a Saint"	3:13
4.	"Bleed a Little, Allison"	3:46
5.	"Say Anything"	4:19
6.	"Sweetest Revenge"	3:18
7.	"Flowers Have O's"	3:55
8.	"Cowgirl's Lament"	4:12
9.	"Jen"	3:20
10.	"I'm Discovered"	3:26
11.	"Daredevil"	5:26
12.	"Atlantic City" (Includes hidden track titled "Fool" starting at 4:07)	7:13
Total length:		49:41
