= Johnny 99 (song) =

Song by Bruce Springsteen

from the album Nebraska
- Released: September 30, 1982
- Recorded: January 3, 1982
- Genre: Blues, country, rock and roll, rockabilly
- Length: 3:38
- Label: Columbia Records
- Songwriter: Bruce Springsteen
- Producer: Bruce Springsteen

"Johnny 99" is a song written and recorded by rock musician Bruce Springsteen, which first appeared on Springsteen's 1982 solo album Nebraska.

== Performance and themes ==
In "Johnny 99" Springsteen sings about an auto worker who gets laid off in Mahwah, New Jersey and shoots and kills a night clerk while drunk and distraught. As a result, he is apprehended and is sentenced to 99 years in prison, but requests to be executed instead. On the song, Springsteen is accompanied only by his acoustic guitar, although he doubles on harmonica as well. Despite the bleakness of the song's themes - including unemployment, poverty, robbery, murder and possibly execution - the tune is ironically jaunty, with a shuffling rockabilly beat.

Like several other songs on the Nebraska album, "Johnny 99" is a song about complete despair. It has direct links with certain songs on Nebraska: the protagonist in "Johnny 99" notes that he has "debts no honest man could pay," repeating a line used by the protagonist in "Atlantic City", and, like the title song, "Johnny 99" is about a murderer — though rather than being a psychopath like the protagonist in the title song, "Johnny 99" is motivated by his economic circumstances.

== History ==
Like the rest of the Nebraska album, "Johnny 99" was recorded in January 1982 in a no-frills studio set up in Springsteen's home in Colts Neck, New Jersey. Most likely it was recorded on January 3, 1982, when most of the album tracks were recorded.

The background of the song is based on the real-life closure of the Ford Motor Company Mahwah Assembly plant, which had been operating from 1955 to 1980. The song also has antecedents in two folk songs that appeared on the box set Anthology of American Folk Music: Julius Daniels' "99-Year Blues" and Carter Family's "John Hardy Was a Desperate Little Man."

Despite its bleak themes, it has been a reasonably popular song in concert, with 421 live performances, the latest in August 2023. A live version was released on the album Live/1975–85. During a September 21, 1984 Born in the U.S.A. Tour concert in Pittsburgh, Springsteen used the introduction to "Johnny 99" to respond to President Reagan referencing the message of hope in Bruce Springsteen's songs, stating "The president was mentioning my name the other day, and I kinda got to wondering what his favorite album musta been. I don't think it was the Nebraska album. I don't think he's been listening to this one."

Other artists have recorded "Johnny 99". Most famously, Johnny Cash recorded it along with "Highway Patrolman", another Nebraska song, for an album Cash titled Johnny 99. The song has also been recorded for Bruce Springsteen covers albums by John Hiatt and Los Lobos. Punk rock band The Loved Ones covered the song on their EP, Distractions. Mark Erelli and Jeffrey Foucault also covered the song for Seven Curses, an album of murder ballads. The band Shovels & Rope covered the song as well and perform it occasionally live. It was also released as B-side of a 2006 single by UK rock band Mystic Knights of The Sea. The A-side of this single was an earlier Springsteen tune, "Cadillac Ranch."

== Critical reception ==
In praising the album Nebraska, "Johnny 99" is one of the songs that was singled out by Mikal Gilmore of the Los Angeles Herald Examiner. In discussing Springsteen's growth as a writer, he stated that "When Springsteen tells Charlie Starkweather and Johnny 99's tales, he neither seeks their redemption nor asks for our judgment. He tells the stories about as simply and as well as they deserve to be told - or about as unsparingly as we deserve to hear them - and he lets us feel for them what we can, or find in them what we can of ourselves."

Though never released as a single anywhere, "Johnny 99" garnered enough album oriented rock airplay to reach #50 on the U.S. Billboard Mainstream Rock Tracks chart.

== Personnel ==
According to authors Philippe Margotin and Jean-Michel Guesdon:

- Bruce Springsteen – vocals, guitar, harmonica
