= Open All Night (song) =

1982 single by Bruce Springsteen

Single by Bruce Springsteen

from the album Nebraska
- B-side: "The Big Payback"
- Released: November 1982
- Recorded: June 23, 1982
- Genre: Folk rock, rock and roll
- Length: 2:58
- Label: Columbia
- Songwriter(s): Bruce Springsteen

Bruce Springsteen singles chronology
"Atlantic City" (1982)	"Open All Night" (1982)	"Dancing in the Dark" (1984)

"Open All Night" is a song written and recorded by rock musician Bruce Springsteen, which first appeared on Springsteen's 1982 solo album Nebraska.

== History ==
Of the 10 songs on Nebraska, "Open All Night" is the only one to feature an electric guitar. With a Chuck Berry-style guitar riff, the song tells the story of an unnamed narrator's all-night drive across industrial New Jersey to reach his girl, Wanda, whom he met when she was a waitress at the Route 60 Bob's Big Boy.

"Open All Night" was released as a single in the UK, backed by "The Big Payback", but did not chart. It was also released as a single in The Netherlands and Spain. Though never released as a single in the United States, it garnered enough album oriented rock airplay to reach #22 on the U.S. Billboard Mainstream Rock Tracks chart.

Springsteen performed this song infrequently until the Sessions Band Tour of 2006, when it was transformed into an eight-minute "show-stopping rave-up" whose already surreal lyrics were made more strange by being rapped against a big band swing arrangement and a pseudo-Andrews Sisters female backing vocal trio. This is the version that appears on the Live in Dublin CD and DVD.

Jay Farrar of Son Volt recorded a version which was released in 2005 on A Retrospective: 1995–2000.

In November 2014 Pearl Jam covered the song in Lincoln, Nebraska.

== Personnel ==
According to authors Philippe Margotin and Jean-Michel Guesdon:

- Bruce Springsteen – vocals, guitar
