= Nebraska (song) =

1982 song by Bruce Springsteen

Promotional single by Bruce Springsteen

from the album Nebraska
- Released: 1982
- Recorded: January 3, 1982
- Genre: Folk; folk rock
- Length: 4:32
- Label: Columbia Records
- Songwriter: Bruce Springsteen
- Producer: Bruce Springsteen

"Nebraska" is the title song of Bruce Springsteen's 1982 album. The stark, moody composition sets the tone for the LP, the content of which consists mostly of songs about criminals and desperate people, accompanied only by acoustic guitar and harmonica. The song has been covered by other artists, including Steve Earle, Chrissie Hynde, and Aoife O'Donovan.

== Description ==
"Nebraska" is sung as a first person narrative of Charles Starkweather, who along with his teenage girlfriend Caril Ann Fugate murdered 11 people over an eight-day period in 1958. Springsteen sings of 10 deaths, as Starkweather had already killed one man prior to their meeting. The song begins with Starkweather meeting Fugate:

I saw her standin' on her front lawn just a twirlin' her baton
Me and her went for a ride, sir ... and 10 innocent people died

The economy of language in the opening is reminiscent of American writer Flannery O'Connor, whose work Springsteen had been reading prior to writing the songs for Nebraska. O'Connor's influence is heard throughout the song, with its confused characters who resort to violence. The song's last line, where the narrator gives his reason for the killings as "I guess there's just a meanness in this world" is similar to the ending of O'Connor's story "A Good Man Is Hard to Find", where the killer states "it's nothing for you to do but enjoy the few minutes you got left the best way you can -- by killing somebody or burning down his house or doing some other meanness to him. No pleasure but meanness." In another line from the song, the singer states that he isn't sorry for his actions and that "At least for a little while, sir, me and her we had us some fun." Springsteen has stated the last stanza, including the lines "into that great void my soul'd be hurled" and "there's just a meanness in this world" summarizes how he saw himself and all of humanity, as dogged by an existential doom.

Springsteen was inspired to write the song after seeing Terrence Malick's movie Badlands on television. The portrait in the opening lines of the girl standing on her front lawn twirling her baton was taken from the movie. He researched the Starkweather killings, including interviewing Ninette Beaver, who had written a book about the killings. Perhaps owing to artistic license, Springsteen did not create an entirely accurate account of the events. For example, Starkweather was not known to have attributed his actions to "a meanness in this world." However, many aspects of the song reflect history. The narrator hopes his "pretty baby is sittin' right there on my lap" when he is sent to the electric chair. In real life Starkweather did his best to take Fugate down with him (although she escaped execution). In a letter from prison to his parents, Starkweather wrote, "But dad I'm not real sorry for what I did cause for the first time me and Caril have (sic) more fun." This is reflected in the lyrics:

I can't say that I'm sorry for the things that we done
At least for a little while, sir, me and her we had us some fun

Springsteen recorded the entire album on a cassette tape deck in his bedroom on Jan. 3, 1982. Although intended as a demo for the E-Street Band, producer Jon Landau felt that the song would be best served by an arrangement with an acoustic bass, brushed drums and piano. However, the arrangement did not work. Neither did full-band arrangements of other songs from the original recording. Eventually, the demo version was released.

"Nebraska" has appeared on several Springsteen releases since its initial appearance. A live version with full instrumentation appeared on Live/1975-85. In 2003, the song was included on the compilation album The Essential Bruce Springsteen. The song also appears in a segment of the video VH1 Storytellers.

== Personnel ==
According to authors Philippe Margotin and Jean-Michel Guesdon:

- Bruce Springsteen – vocals, guitar, harmonica, mandolin, glockenspiel
