= Highway Patrolman =

Song by Bruce Springsteen

from the album Nebraska
- Released: 1982
- Recorded: January 1982
- Genre: Folk rock, folk
- Length: 5:40
- Label: Columbia
- Songwriter: Bruce Springsteen
- Producer: Bruce Springsteen

"Highway Patrolman" is a song written and recorded by the American singer-songwriter Bruce Springsteen and was first released as the fifth track on his 1982 album Nebraska.

The song tells the story of Joe Roberts, the highway patrolman of the title from whose viewpoint the song is written, and his brother, Frankie, and is set in the 1960s. Frankie is portrayed as unruly and frequently causing and encountering trouble, while Joe is the more mature and sensible brother who always comes to his aid.

In 1965, Frankie joins the United States Army (and presumably is sent to Vietnam, though this is not made explicit), while Joe takes a farm deferment and marries a girl called Maria (who, it is implied, had attracted the attentions of both brothers). Within three years, however, falling wheat prices cause Joe to leave the farm and take a job as a highway patrolman. Meanwhile, in 1968, Frankie leaves the army and returns home. One night, Joe receives a call and visits a bar where a boy has been attacked and appears to be in a serious condition ("on the floor looking bad, bleeding hard from his head"), with a witness ("a girl crying at a table") identifying his attacker as Frankie, who has fled. Joe chases Frankie through rural Michigan until they reach – and Frankie crosses – the Canada–US border, the implication being that Joe has allowed him to escape, as suggested by the lyrics "when it's your brother, sometimes you look the other way" and "I pulled over the side of the highway and watched his tail lights disappear."

Like the rest of the album, the song was recorded on Springsteen's four-track cassette recorder with the intention of it being performed for Nebraska with the E Street Band. However, it was felt that the demo version of the song was superior to the band version and it was released on the album in its original form. It features the same stark, bleak atmosphere as the other songs on the album, and it consists of only vocals, very quiet harmonica and acoustic guitar.

Springsteen featured the song only once on the "American Land" leg of his Sessions Band Tour, and the version is featured on the 2007 release Bruce Springsteen with The Sessions Band: Live in Dublin. This version was praised by Rolling Stone critic Andy Greene as the "fantastic, maybe definitive" version of the song.

== Artistic licenses ==
Throughout "Highway Patrolman", Springsteen employs fictional locations and details to create an evocative setting:

- The lyrics say Joe is "a sergeant out of Perrineville." The only American city with that name is Perrineville, New Jersey. There is, however, an unincorporated community called Perronville in Harris Township, Michigan.
- While the lyrics state, "I must have done a hundred and ten through Michigan county that night," there is no Michigan County anywhere in the United States.
- The refrain mentions a song called "The Night of the Johnstown Flood," but the song is probably fictitious. In the years after "Highway Patrolman" was released, several groups would record songs with that title.

== Legacy ==
Sean Penn based the screenplay of his 1991 directorial debut The Indian Runner on the song's story. Penn also directed a music video of the song that appeared on 2001 reissue of Video Anthology / 1978–88.

The song was covered by Johnny Cash on his 1983 album Johnny 99.

Dar Williams performed "Highway Patrolman" on Badlands - A Tribute to Bruce Springsteen's Nebraska.

Whitey Morgan covered the song on his 2014 album Grandpa's Guitar.

Croatian writer Jurica Pavičić was inspired by the song to write an eponymous novel about two brothers. Croatian Television made it into a 5-episodes TV Show Patrola na cesti (Highway Patrol) in 2015-16.

== Personnel ==
According to authors Philippe Margotin and Jean-Michel Guesdon:

- Bruce Springsteen – vocals, guitar, harmonica, mandolin
