= I'm Goin' Down =

Single by Bruce Springsteen

from the album Born in the U.S.A.
- B-side: "Janey, Don't You Lose Heart" (7-inch and 12-inch singles); "Held Up Without a Gun" (12-inch single only)
- Released: August 27, 1985
- Recorded: May 12–13, 1982
- Studio: Power Station, New York City
- Genre: Rock
- Length: 3:29
- Label: Columbia
- Songwriter: Bruce Springsteen
- Producers: Jon Landau; Chuck Plotkin; Bruce Springsteen; Steven Van Zandt

Bruce Springsteen singles chronology
"Glory Days" (1985)	"I'm Goin' Down" (1985)	"My Hometown" (1985)

"I'm Goin' Down" is a rock song written and performed by the American singer-songwriter Bruce Springsteen. It was released on August 27, 1985 by Columbia Records as the sixth single from his 1984 album Born in the U.S.A. The song was recorded with the E Street Band in May 1982 at the Power Station music studio in New York City, and co-produced by Springsteen, Jon Landau, Chuck Plotkin, and Steve Van Zandt. Although Springsteen had changing ideas about the songs to put on the album, "I'm Goin' Down" was ultimately selected for inclusion.

The recording is based on an energetic band performance that gives prominence to a heavy drum sound. The lyrics focus on sexual frustration in a deteriorating relationship. The single reached No. 9 in the United States and the top 30 in Sweden, Italy, and Canada. On the album's release, it was praised by critics for the band's musicianship and Springsteen's vocals and lyrics. Later it received favorable rankings in retrospectives of Springsteen's career, among which was an NME list calling it his fourth best song.

Springsteen has not often performed the song since the Born in the U.S.A. Tour. Between 2002 and 2023, it appeared on about 6.5 percent of the set lists published on his official website. "I'm Goin' Down" has been covered by Frank Black and the Catholics, Trampled by Turtles, Free Energy, Vampire Weekend, and other artists.

== Background and recording ==
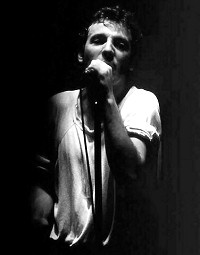
Springsteen performing in Drammen, Norway in 1981

Bruce Springsteen's fifth album, The River, was released in October 1980 and reached No. 1 in the Billboard Top LPs & Tape chart. His follow-up, Nebraska, began as a series of solo demo recordings, of which fifteen songs were mixed onto a cassette on January 3, 1982. That April, he began recording sessions at the Power Station music studio in New York City with the E Street Band—whose line-up then consisted of Roy Bittan, Clarence Clemons, Danny Federici, Garry Tallent, Steve Van Zandt, and Max Weinberg—with production by Springsteen, Van Zandt, Jon Landau, and Chuck Plotkin.

He at first recorded a number of full-band versions of Nebraska songs, including "Atlantic City", "Nebraska", and "Mansion on the Hill". However, he and his co-producers were dissatisfied with the recordings. To buy time to decide on the best approach for these songs, by May 1982 the band had begun to record other material he had written. "I'm Goin' Down" was recorded over May 12–13, with Toby Scott as the audio engineer, and Billy Straus one of his assistants. In 2012, Clinton Heylin wrote that throughout the ten recorded takes of the song, Springsteen let the band "vamp away, only to curtail them in the final mix". Eventually, Springsteen released solo recordings—mostly from the January cassette—as the Nebraska album, which came out in September 1982, and temporarily shelved "I'm Goin' Down" and other band tracks from May. (Note: Other band tracks from May 1982 that were not immediately released included "Born in the U.S.A.", "Glory Days", "Downbound Train", "Darlington County", "Working on the Highway", "I'm on Fire", and "Cover Me".)

In 1983, he recorded more songs with the E Street Band, but was considering using solo tracks for his next album, which eventually became Born in the U.S.A., as he had done for Nebraska. By the following year, Landau and Plotkin had convinced Springsteen to release band tracks, including several from May 1982 and a number of subsequently recorded songs. At one point, Springsteen was not going to include "I'm Goin' Down" on Born in the U.S.A., but later added it in place of "Pink Cadillac", which he used as the B-side for "Dancing in the Dark".

== Music, lyrics, and themes ==
=== Music ===
"I'm Goin' Down"
One critic has described the gibberish syllables near the end of the song as contributing to a "giddy" feel.

A rock song, "I'm Goin' Down" is described by Uncut contributor John Lewis as having a country music influence, and "sound[ing] in places like Johnny Cash". For other critics, the song contains rockabilly elements. It begins with a short two-phrase guitar line, followed by Weinberg's heavy drum beat, one of the most prominent components in the song. Music biographers Jean-Michel Guesdon and Philippe Margotin have commented on Bob Clearmountain's "signature" mixing of the track that makes the snare drum sound "[crack] like a whip". These instruments are supplemented by bass by Tallent, a Hammond B-3 organ part by Federici, and piano by Bittan. The song additionally includes a tenor saxophone solo by Clemons, and hand-clapping by the band. The music is based on a descending chord progression of A ("I'm goin")–E ("down, down down")–F♯m ("down, I'm goin")–D ("down"), which is played throughout the track, while the bass guitar plays around the root of E.

=== Lyrics and themes ===
Reviewers have commented on the contrast between the song's upbeat music and sad lyrics. The song explores themes of sexual or romantic frustration, loneliness, and grief resulting from unsuccessful relationships. Some reviewers have found humor in the lyrics, which describe incidents such as the narrator's girlfriend rejecting his attempts at intimacy and sighing with boredom, as well as the couple returning home fighting after a date. In concert, Springsteen has described "I'm Goin' Down" in jest as "one of my more insightful songs about men and women". In live performances in 1984, he sometimes used variations of the following introduction for the song: "[First] you're making love to 'em all the time, three or four times a day. Then you come back a little bit later, and, uh-oh ... it's like 'Are you gonna make love to me tonight, or are we gonna wait for the full moon again', y'know?"

In researcher Pamela Moss's feminist analysis of social class and gender in Springsteen's lyrics, she describes the singer's early-to-mid-1980s oeuvre as being filled with despair. Moss states that within this context, men fault women for not helping them achieve their dream of finding "a promised land". In "I'm Goin' Down", with the "deterioration of a desirable sexual relationship [the narrator] feels he is being 'set up' by the woman just so she will be able to reject him". According to Moss, the man sees the woman's rejection as interference holding back his attempt at a "liberation of the tedium of a working class existence".

== Release and reception ==
Born in the U.S.A. was released on June 4, 1984 by Columbia Records, and "I'm Goin' Down", the album's sixth single, on August 27, 1985. The 7-inch single version includes B-side "Janey, Don't You Lose Heart", while the 12-inch Maxi has "Janey, Don't You Lose Heart" and "Held Up Without a Gun". (Note: Originally written for and rejected by Stevie Nicks, "Janey, Don't You Lose Heart" was recorded on June 16, 1983 at the Hit Factory, in New York City, but features backing vocals by Nils Lofgren from a studio session in 1985. It has been described as "a gentle, encouraging love song" that would not seem out of place on the country music charts, and as a decidedly pop track with a pleasing chorus. The song was later released on 12" Single Collection (1985), Tracks (1998), and 18 Tracks (1999). Some reviewers have highlighted the value and collectible nature that non-album songs such as "Janey, Don't You Lose Heart", at the time only available on the single, represented for Springsteen fans. "Held Up Without a Gun" had also appeared as the B-side of "Hungry Heart" (1980), and was released on The Ties That Bind: The River Collection (2015). Sources list multiple recording dates in February and April 1980 for the song, which is 75 seconds in length, and has a punk rock influence. It tells the story of a "rocker who is cheated by his cigar-chomping manager", which some critics have interpreted as a likely reference to Springsteen's own struggles with his former manager Mike Appel of Laurel Canyon Productions.) In the United States, "I'm Goin' Down" entered the Billboard Hot 100 singles chart on September 7, and peaked at No. 9 on October 25. It was one of a record-tying seven top 10 singles to be released from a single album. (Note: Michael Jackson's Thriller and Janet Jackson's Rhythm Nation 1814 also each share this record.) It also charted in Canada, Australia, Italy, Sweden, and Germany. No music video was made for the song making this and "Cover Me" as the only singles from the album not to have a music videos. The track was additionally released on 12" Single Collection in 1985, and The Album Collection Vol. 1 1973–1984 in 2014. Writer Greg Kot has noted that despite the single's chart success, the song was not included on Springsteen's 1995 Greatest Hits compilation.

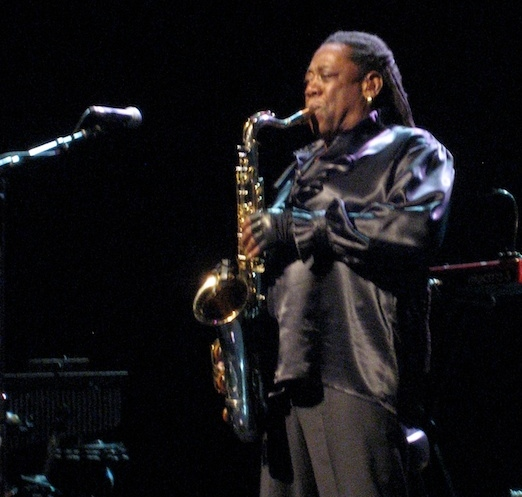
Critics have praised the saxophone solo by E Street Band member Clarence Clemons.

"I'm Goin' Down" was generally well received by critics at the time of the album's release. Some reviewers considered the song to be among the best on Born in the U.S.A., including Ken Tucker of The Philadelphia Inquirer, who called the track one of the "emotional centerpieces on the album, and perhaps [one of] the finest examples of Springsteen's songwriting to date". The Morning Call's Paul Willistein and The Cincinnati Enquirer's Cliff Radel similarly commended the songwriting. Willistein wrote that the composition "evidences vulnerability, sensitivity and wisdom". Among the musical components praised by critics were its percussion, vocals, and guitar, as well as Clemons' saxophone solo. The musicians' passion and the song's fun energy were other elements singled out by reviewers. Debbie Miller of Rolling Stone described the track as "wonderfully exuberant". Sounds critic Sandy Robertson, reviewing a pre-release version of Born in the U.S.A. on which the title was listed as "Down Down Down", characterized the song as "a hit single if I ever heard one" and "the core that justifies most of the hype dumped on [Springsteen]".

Some contemporary reviews were negative or neutral. The Vancouver Sun's Ian Gill dismissed the track as "simply a concession to the zit set". About the song's choice as the album's sixth single, critic Jan DeKnock called the release "the dud of the week" that was "an uninspired ... filler cut". David Hinkley of New York's Daily News considered it an unexceptional song on which Springsteen did not add much that was new to its common theme.

== Live performances ==
Springsteen has played "I'm Goin' Down" infrequently since the end of the Born in the U.S.A. Tour. For his tours between 2002 and 2023, many of the set lists have been published on his official website, Brucespringsteen.net. Of these, all of the singer's performances of the song are listed in the table below. (Note: This is based on set lists that were captured in archived versions of his website in November 2008 (for the 2002—2008 tours), May 2017 (for the 2009–2017 tours), and February 2024 (for the 2023 tour).)

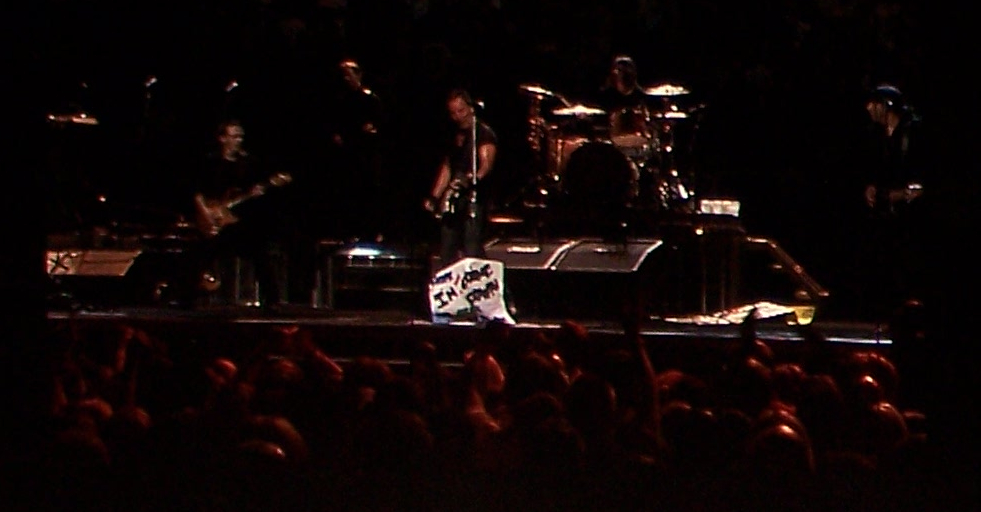
Springsteen with a sign from an audience member requesting "I'm Goin' Down" on May 21, 2009 in East Rutherford

Springsteen sometimes takes song requests at concerts by collecting signs from the audience, as he did for "I'm Goin' Down" on May 21, 2009 in East Rutherford, New Jersey, on February 27, 2016 in Rochester, New York, and on August 2, 2008 in Foxborough, Massachusetts—where he introduced the song as "rarely played and even more rarely requested".

A number of music critics have mentioned how live versions differ from the Born in the U.S.A. version. Describing a performance of the song at an August 25, 1984 show in Landover, Maryland, critic Geoffrey Himes wrote that the "lean, synth-dominated album arrangement was supplanted by a full-tilt rock 'n' soul version". Springsteen later admitted that the recorded version "had a swing ... we could never capture live".

2002–2023 performances of "I'm Goin' Down"
Tour or special performance	Year	Location and date	# of published "I'm Goin' Down" performances
The Rising Tour	2002	N/A	0/45 (0%)
The Rising Tour	2003	Philadelphia – August 11; Hartford – September 18; Detroit – September 21	3/75 (4%)
Devils & Dust Tour	2005	N/A	0/72 (0%)
Bruce Springsteen with the Seeger Sessions Band Tour	2006	N/A	0/27 (0%)
Magic Tour	2007	N/A	0/40 (0%)
Magic Tour	2008	Barcelona – July 20; Foxborough – August 2 Nashville – August 21	3/64 (4.7%)
Working on a Dream Tour	2009	Tulsa – April 7 Los Angeles – April 15; Boston – April 21; East Rutherford – May 21; Stockholm – June 4 Frankfurt – July 3 Carhaix – July 16; Mansfield – August 23; Chicago – September 20; East Rutherford – October 2 East Rutherford – October 3* East Rutherford – October 9* Philadelphia – October 20*	13/85 (15.3%)
Wrecking Ball World Tour	2012	Sevilla – May 13; Paris – July 5 Gothenburg – July 28; Chicago – September 7 Hamilton – October 21; Oakland – November 30	6/91 (6.6%)
Wrecking Ball World Tour	2013	Melbourne – March 27; Stockholm – May 11*; Munich – May 26*; Milan – June 3* Paris – June 29*; London – June 30*; Kilkenny – July 27*; Rio de Janeiro – September 21*	8/47 (17%)
High Hopes Tour	2014	Melbourne – February 15*; Hunter Valley – February 23; Auckland – March 1*	3/34 (8.8%)
Saturday Night Live	2015	N/A	0/1 (0%)
The River Tour	2016	Rochester – February 27; Seattle – March 24; Barcelona – May 14; San Sebastián – May 17; Glasgow – June 1 Oslo – June 29; East Rutherford – August 30; Philadelphia – September 9	8/72 (11.1%)
The River Tour	2017	Perth – January 27; Melbourne – February 4 Mount Macedon – February 11; Hunter Valley – February 18	4/14 (28.6%)
2023 Tour	2023	N/A	0/66 (0%)
Total			48/733 (6.5%)
*Indicates that Springsteen performed the entire Born in the U.S.A. album at this concert.

== Legacy and cover versions ==
"I'm Goin' Down" has received various ratings in overviews that consider all of Springsteen's songs. A 2017 article in NME calls it the fourth greatest Springsteen song of all time. A 2014 Rolling Stone article ranks "I'm Goin' Down" as the 52nd best Bruce Springsteen song ever, and it is included in writer June Skinner Sawyer's Tougher Than the Rest: 100 Best Bruce Springsteen Songs. By contrast, in Counting Down Bruce Springsteen: His 100 Finest Songs, Jim Beviglia puts "I'm Goin' Down" as the 131st best Springsteen track, calling it "a fun but relatively minor" work. A critic for NJ.com described it as the worst song of Born in the U.S.A., and placed it in the No. 164 position of 318 of the singer's works. In 2015, Uncut rated the song four stars out of five.

In the Billboard 2014 article "Bruce Springsteen's Born in the U.S.A. at 30: Classic Track-By-Track Album Review", Caryn Rose called it the album's "most underrated song" and "the kind of good-time party song that Springsteen and E Street do best, sliding easily through the verses with a ... bouncing rhythm ... and a fun, jumping end". The song is likewise described favorably in "Born in the U.S.A. has stood the test of time", a 2002 overview in New Jersey's Daily Record newspaper.

Following the September 11, 2001 terrorist attacks in the eastern United States, Clear Channel Communications—the owner at the time of over 1000 radio stations—issued a memorandum of songs to temporarily avoid playing, which included "I'm Goin' Down". The list comprised songs that were "too dark ... [or referred] to crashes ... or death", or that simply had "questionable" titles, which might depress listeners grieving from the attacks.

Various musicians have covered "I'm Goin' Down". In 1998, Frank Black and the Catholics—whose bandleader has expressed his admiration for the "brilliant ... structure" of Springsteen's recording—included a version on their "Dog Gone" single, and in 2015 on The Complete Recordings. Rancid frontman Tim Armstrong put out a cover in 2012 as part of his Tim Timebomb and Friends collection, while Dessa released a version on her 2013 album Parts of Speech. The following year, a recording with fiddles and banjos by bluegrass group Trampled by Turtles, who have frequently played "I'm Goin' Down" in concert, appeared on the multi-artist compilation album Dead Man's Town: A Tribute to Born in the U.S.A.

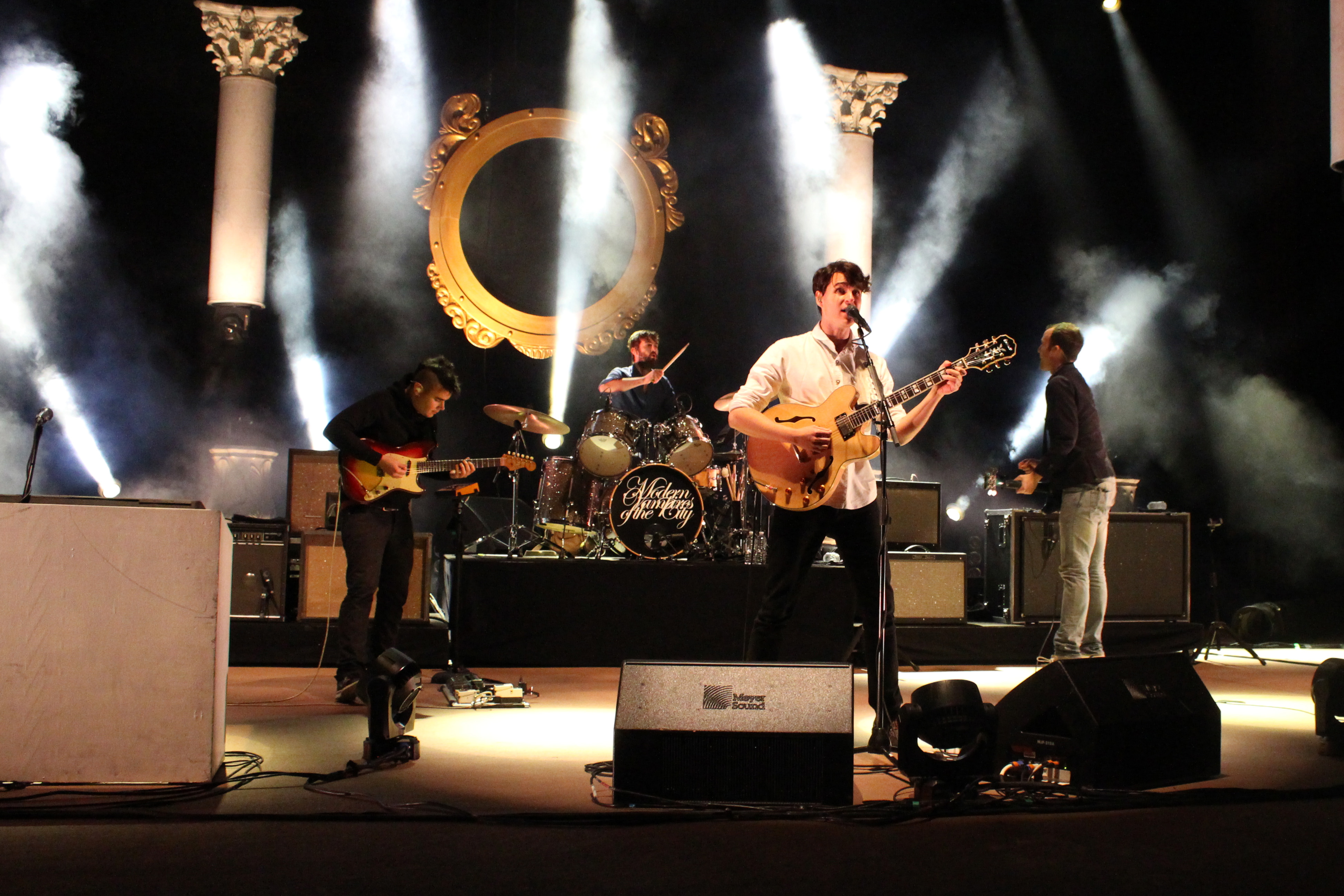
The band Vampire Weekend released versions of "I'm Goin' Down" in 2010 and 2019.

In September 2010, the online magazines Stereogum and Pitchfork noted how multiple bands had recently performed "I'm Goin' Down" in live settings within weeks of each other: Vampire Weekend played the song in concert in Vancouver and a few days later in early September on a radio show in Seattle, while Free Energy and Titus Andronicus performed it together later that month in Atlanta on their joint tour. Like Frank Black, members of Vampire Weekend have expressed their high regard for Springsteen's composition, among whom vocalist Ezra Koenig had previously listened to the song "constantly", and bassist Chris Baio cited Springsteen's "incredible melodies, incredible lyrics" that led the band to think "it would be exciting to put our spin on" the song. Free Energy and Vampire Weekend each released a recording of it on iTunes in 2010. Other releases include a Spotify single by Vampire Weekend in 2019.

== Formats and track listing ==
- 7-inch single
1. "I'm Goin' Down" – 3:29
2. "Janey, Don't You Lose Heart" – 3:23
- 12-inch single
1. "I'm Goin' Down" – 3:29
2. "Janey, Don't You Lose Heart" – 3:23
3. "Held Up Without a Gun" – 1:15

== Charts ==
Weekly chart performance for "I'm Goin' Down"
Chart (1985)	Peak position
Australian Kent Music Report Singles Chart	41
Canadian RPM Singles Chart	23
German Gfk Singles Charts	61
Italian Musica e Dischi Singles Chart	20
Quebec (ADISQ)	26
Swedish Sverigetopplistan Singles Charts	13
US Billboard Hot 100	9

== Personnel ==
The personnel listed below participated in the recording of "I'm Goin' Down":

Musicians:

- Bruce Springsteen – vocals, guitars
- Steve Van Zandt – guitars
- Clarence Clemons – saxophone, tambourine
- Roy Bittan – piano
- Danny Federici – organ
- Garry Tallent – bass
- Max Weinberg – drums
- The group – handclaps

Technical team:

- Bruce Springsteen – producer
- Jon Landau – producer
- Chuck Plotkin – producer
- Steve Van Zandt – producer
- Toby Scott – audio engineer
- John Davenport – assistant audio engineer
- Jeff Hendrickson – assistant audio engineer
- Bruce Lampcov – assistant audio engineer
- Billy Straus – assistant audio engineer
- Zoë Yanakas – assistant audio engineer
- Bob Clearmountain – mixing
- Bob Ludwig – mastering
