= Live 1975–85 =

Live/1975–85

Live album by Bruce Springsteen and the E Street Band
- Released: November 10, 1986
- Recorded: October 18, 1975 – September 30, 1985
- Venues: The Roxy, West Hollywood; Nassau Coliseum, Uniondale; Winterland Ballroom, San Francisco; Meadowlands Arena, East Rutherford; Arizona State University, Tempe; Giants Stadium, East Rutherford; Los Angeles Memorial Coliseum, Exposition Park
- Studios: (Additional recording): Right Track Recording, Manhattan; The Hit Factory, New York City; Record Plant, Los Angeles
- Genre: Rock
- Length: 216:13
- Label: Columbia
- Producers: Jon Landau; Chuck Plotkin; Bruce Springsteen

Bruce Springsteen and the E Street Band chronology
Born in the U.S.A. (1984)	Live/1975–85 (1986)	Tunnel of Love (1987)

Singles from Live/1975–1985
- 1. "War" Released: November 10, 1986; 2. "Fire" Released: January 1987

Live/1975–85 is a live album by Bruce Springsteen and the E Street Band, consisting of 40 tracks recorded at various concerts between 1975 and 1985, and released as a box set through Columbia Records on November 10, 1986. It broke the record for advance orders and based on Recording Industry Association of America (RIAA) certifications, is the second-best-selling live album in the US. Rolling Stone hailed it as "an embarrassment of riches", while The New York Times said it was "an unprecedented event in popular recording" and "monumental".

== Background ==
Springsteen writes in the liner notes, "Jon Landau sent a four-song cassette of "Born in the U.S.A.", 'Seeds', "The River" and "War" down to my house with a note attached saying he 'thought we might have something here'. Over the following months we listened to 10 years of tapes, the music did the talkin', and this album and its story began to emerge. We hope you have as much fun with it as we did. I'd like to thank Jon for his friendship and perseverance and the E Street Band for 1,001 nights of comradeship and good rockin'. They're all about the best bunch of people you can have at your side when you're goin' on a long drive."

== Release and performance ==
The album debuted at the top of the Billboard album chart, a then-rare occurrence that hadn't happened since Stevie Wonder's Songs in the Key of Life in 1976. Live 1975-85 also became the first five-record set to reach the Top 10, and the first to sell over a million copies. It was released as a box set of five vinyl records, three cassettes or three CDs. There was also an exclusive record club release of three 8-track cartridges. Being both long-awaited and highly anticipated, the album generated advance orders of more than 1.5 million copies, making it the largest dollar-value pre-order at the time. Despite some record stores opening early, they were still confronted with lines of fans. "We're selling them as fast as we can get them out of the box," said Don Bergentry, a New York retailer, adding, "This is the biggest thing I have ever seen in records."

Live/1975–85 is the second-best-selling live album in US history based on RIAA certification, which puts it at 13× platinum, trailing only Garth Brooks' Double Live. The box set's sales performance attracted considerable media attention at the time, immediately for setting records during the 1986 holiday shopping period, and subsequently for the sharp drop-off in sales in early 1987, leaving many retailers overstocked.

Two singles were released: "War" (a cover of the 1970 Edwin Starr hit), which reached No. 8 on the U.S. pop singles chart, and "Fire" (a Springsteen song that was a top 10 hit for the Pointer Sisters in 1979), which only reached No. 46, breaking Springsteen's string of eight consecutive Top 10 singles. Two non-album tracks — "Incident on 57th Street", recorded at Nassau Coliseum in December 1980, and "For You", taken from the July 1978 Roxy show — materialized on B-sides from the album's singles, and on a Japanese release, Live Collection. The music video for "War" was taken from the concert where it was recorded, while the video for "Fire" was from a completely unrelated 1986 acoustic performance at a Bridge School Benefit concert. A third video, for "Born to Run", was also released, which showed a melange of clips from the band's 1984–85 Born in the U.S.A. Tour.

== Critical reception ==
Professional ratings
Review scores
Source	Rating
Allmusic	4.5/5 stars
Chicago Tribune	3/4 stars
New Musical Express	7/10
Rolling Stone	positive
Smash Hits	7½/10
Tom Hull	B+
The Village Voice	A−

Most reviews were overwhelmingly positive. The New York Times found it to be the "equivalent of an epic American novel, its story told in the ungrammatical, rough-hewn vocabulary of rock", possessing an "historical resonance that goes beyond pop culture". Rolling Stone said it was "an extraordinary demonstration of how Springsteen’s telepathic command of a concert audience has increased in direct proportion to the size of his stage." It lauded Springsteen's "raw power, lyric honesty and spiritual determination". However, the magazine was not alone in highlighting the omission of several concert highlights, including "Prove It All Night" and Springsteen's rousing cover of John Fogerty's "Who'll Stop the Rain". Nor was it the only one to note that some superior unreleased songs, such as "The Fever", were ignored in favor of recent album tracks like "Darlington County".

== Track listing ==
=== Vinyl ===
All tracks are written by Bruce Springsteen, except where noted.

Side one
No.	Title	Recording date and location	Length
1.	"Thunder Road"	October 18, 1975, Roxy Theatre, West Hollywood, California	5:44
2.	"Adam Raised a Cain"	July 7, 1978, Roxy Theatre, West Hollywood, California	5:26
3.	"Spirit in the Night"	July 7, 1978, Roxy Theatre, West Hollywood, California	6:25
4.	"4th of July, Asbury Park (Sandy)"	December 31, 1980, Nassau Coliseum, Uniondale, New York^{[a]}	6:34

Side two
No.	Title	Recording date and location	Length
1.	"Paradise by the 'C'"	July 7, 1978, Roxy Theatre, West Hollywood, California^{[b]}	3:52
2.	"Fire"	December 16, 1978, Winterland, San Francisco^{[c]}	2:51
3.	"Growin' Up"	July 7, 1978, Roxy Theatre, West Hollywood, California	7:54
4.	"It's Hard to Be a Saint in the City"	July 7, 1978, Roxy Theatre, West Hollywood, California	4:39

Side three
No.	Title	Recording date and location	Length
1.	"Backstreets"	July 7, 1978, Roxy Theatre, West Hollywood, California^{[d]}	7:35
2.	"Rosalita (Come Out Tonight)"	July 7, 1978, Roxy Theatre, West Hollywood, California	10:00
3.	"Raise Your Hand" (writers: Steve Cropper, Eddie Floyd, Alvertis Isbell)	July 7, 1978, Roxy Theatre, West Hollywood, California	4:56

Side four
No.	Title	Recording date and location	Length
1.	"Hungry Heart"	December 28, 1980, Nassau Coliseum, Uniondale, New York	4:28
2.	"Two Hearts"	July 8, 1981, Meadowlands Arena, East Rutherford, New Jersey	3:06
3.	"Cadillac Ranch^{[e]}"	July 6, 1981, Meadowlands Arena, East Rutherford, New Jersey	4:52
4.	"You Can Look (But You Better Not Touch)"	December 29, 1980, Nassau Coliseum, Uniondale, New York	3:58
5.	"Independence Day"	July 6, 1981, Meadowlands Arena, East Rutherford, New Jersey	4:52

Side five
No.	Title	Recording date and location	Length
1.	"Badlands"	November 5, 1980, ASU Activity Center, Tempe, Arizona^{[f]}	5:17
2.	"Because the Night" (writers: Springsteen, Patti Smith)	December 28, 1980, Nassau Coliseum, Uniondale, New York^{[g]}	5:19
3.	"Candy's Room"	July 8, 1981, Meadowlands Arena, East Rutherford, New Jersey	3:19
4.	"Darkness on the Edge of Town"	December 29, 1980, Nassau Coliseum, Uniondale, New York	4:19
5.	"Racing in the Street"	July 6, 1981, Meadowlands Arena, East Rutherford, New Jersey	8:12

Side six
No.	Title	Recording date and location	Length
1.	"This Land Is Your Land" (writers: Woody Guthrie)	December 29, 1980, Nassau Coliseum, Uniondale, New York^{[h]}	4:21
2.	"Nebraska"	August 6, 1984, Meadowlands Arena, East Rutherford, New Jersey	4:18
3.	"Johnny 99"	August 19, 1985, Giants Stadium, East Rutherford, New Jersey	4:24
4.	"Reason to Believe"	August 19, 1984, Meadowlands Arena, East Rutherford, New Jersey	5:19

Side seven
No.	Title	Recording date and location	Length
1.	"Born in the U.S.A."	September 30, 1985, Los Angeles Coliseum	6:10
2.	"Seeds"	September 30, 1985, Los Angeles Coliseum	5:14
3.	"The River"	September 30, 1985, Los Angeles Coliseum	11:42

Side eight
No.	Title	Recording date and location	Length
1.	"War" (writers: Barrett Strong, Norman Whitfield)	September 30, 1985, Los Angeles Coliseum	4:53
2.	"Darlington County"	September 30, 1985, Los Angeles Coliseum	5:12
3.	"Working on the Highway"	August 19, 1985, Giants Stadium, East Rutherford, New Jersey	4:04
4.	"The Promised Land"	September 30, 1985, Los Angeles Coliseum	5:36

Side nine
No.	Title	Recording date and location	Length
1.	"Cover Me"	September 30, 1985, Los Angeles Coliseum	6:57
2.	"I'm on Fire"	August 19, 1985, Giants Stadium, East Rutherford, New Jersey	4:26
3.	"Bobby Jean"	August 21, 1985, Giants Stadium, East Rutherford, New Jersey	4:30
4.	"My Hometown"	September 30, 1985, Los Angeles Coliseum^{[i]}	5:13

Side ten
No.	Title	Recording date and location	Length
1.	"Born to Run"	August 19, 1985, Giants Stadium, East Rutherford, New Jersey	5:03
2.	"No Surrender"	August 6, 1984, Meadowlands Arena, East Rutherford, New Jersey	4:41
3.	"Tenth Avenue Freeze-Out"	August 20, 1984, Meadowlands Arena, East Rutherford, New Jersey	4:21
4.	"Jersey Girl" (writer: Tom Waits)	July 9, 1981, Meadowlands Arena, East Rutherford, New Jersey^{[j]}	6:30

Recording locations of the Live 1975–85 album.

Notes

- ^{^[a]} – Mistitled as "4th of July, Ashbury Park" on some CD box sets.
- ^{^[b]} – Song never released by Springsteen before; the version on this release omits Bruce saying "All you bootleggers out there in radioland, roll your tapes" right before the song.
- ^{^[c]} – The short spoken intro is from July 7, 1978, at the Roxy Theatre, West Hollywood, California
- ^{^[d]} – This version edits out a long interpolation near the end which includes an early version of "Drive All Night"
- ^{^[e]} – Mistitled as "Caddillac Ranch" on the CD box set
- ^{^[f]} – Performed night after the election of Ronald Reagan to the United States presidency.
- ^{^[g]} – Song never released by Springsteen before, although recorded by others most notably by Patti Smith and, later, 10,000 Maniacs
- ^{^[h]} – The date in the liner notes is incorrect; the performance actually dates from the following night, December 29.
- ^{^[i]} – This performance previously released as the music video for "My Hometown" single
- ^{^[j]} – This performance was released in 1984 as the B-side of the "Cover Me" single. The song was written by Tom Waits and originally released on his Heartattack and Vine album.

== Personnel ==
- Bruce Springsteen – vocals, electric guitar, harmonica, acoustic guitar on "No Surrender"

The E Street Band

- Roy Bittan – piano, synthesizer, backing vocals
- Clarence Clemons – saxophone, percussion, backing vocals
- Danny Federici – organ, accordion, glockenspiel, piano, synthesizer on "My Hometown", backing vocals
- Nils Lofgren (beginning in 1984) – electric and acoustic guitars, backing vocals
- Patti Scialfa (beginning in 1984) – backing vocals, synthesizer on "Born in the U.S.A."
- Garry Tallent – bass guitar, backing vocals
- Steve Van Zandt (through 1981) – electric guitar, acoustic guitar, backing vocals
- Max Weinberg – drums

Guest musicians

- Flo and Eddie (Howard Kaylan and Mark Volman) – backing vocals on "Hungry Heart"
- The Miami Horns – horns on "Tenth Avenue Freeze-Out"
  - Stan Harrison – tenor saxophone
  - Eddie Manion – baritone saxophone
  - Mark Pender – trumpet
  - Richie "La Bamba" Rosenberg – trombone

Technical

- Bruce Jackson – live sound engineer
- Toby Scott – engineer, recording engineer
- Jimmy Iovine - recording engineer
- Bob Clearmountain - mixing

== Charts ==
Weekly chart performance for Live 1975–85
Chart (1986–1987)	Peak position
Australian Albums (ARIA)	3
Austrian Albums (Ö3 Austria)	8
Canadian Albums (RPM)	1
Dutch Albums (Album Top 100)	1
European Albums (Music & Media)	5
German Albums (Offizielle Top 100)	8
Irish Albums (IRMA)	42
Italian Albums (Musica e Dischi)	8
New Zealand Albums (RMNZ)	11
Norwegian Albums (VG-lista)	3
Swedish Albums (Sverigetopplistan)	2
Swiss Albums (Schweizer Hitparade)	6
UK Albums (Official Charts)	4
US Billboard 200	1
Chart (2008)	Peak position
Finnish Albums (Suomen virallinen lista)	26
Spanish Albums (Promusicae)	72
Chart (2013)	Peak position
Belgian Albums (Ultratop Flanders)	66
Chart (2016)	Peak position
Portuguese Albums (AFP)	25

== Certifications ==
Certifications and sales for Live 1975–85
Region	Certification	Certified units/sales
Australia (ARIA)	Platinum	70,000^{^}
Finland (Musiikkituottajat)	Gold	32,402
France (SNEP)	Gold	100,000^{*}
Germany (BVMI)	Gold	250,000^{^}
Netherlands (NVPI)	Platinum	100,000^{^}
New Zealand (RMNZ)	Gold	7,500^{^}
Portugal (AFP)	Gold	20,000^{^}
Sweden (GLF)	Platinum	100,000^{^}
Switzerland (IFPI Switzerland)	Gold	25,000^{^}
United Kingdom (BPI)	Gold	100,000^{^}
United States (RIAA)	13× Platinum	4,333,329^{^}
^{*} Sales figures based on certification alone.^{^} Shipments figures based on certification alone.

== See also ==
- List of best-selling albums in the United States
