= Born in the U.S.A. =

1984 album by Bruce Springsteen

Studio album by Bruce Springsteen
- Released: June 4, 1984
- Recorded: January 1982 – March 1984
- Studios: Power Station and Hit Factory (New York City)
- Genres: Rock and roll; heartland rock; pop
- Length: 46:41
- Label: Columbia
- Producers: Bruce Springsteen; Jon Landau; Chuck Plotkin; Steven Van Zandt

Bruce Springsteen chronology
Nebraska (1982)	Born in the U.S.A. (1984)	Live 1975–85 (1986)

Bruce Springsteen and the E Street Band chronology
The River (1980)	Born in the U.S.A. (1984)	Live 1975–85 (1986)

Singles from Born in the U.S.A.
- 1. "Dancing in the Dark" Released: May 9, 1984; 2. "Cover Me" Released: July 31, 1984; 3. "Born in the U.S.A." Released: October 30, 1984; 4. "I'm on Fire" Released: February 6, 1985; 5. "Glory Days" Released: May 13, 1985; 6. "I'm Goin' Down" Released: August 27, 1985; 7. "My Hometown" Released: November 21, 1985

Born in the U.S.A. is the seventh studio album by the American singer-songwriter Bruce Springsteen, released on June 4, 1984, through Columbia Records. It was produced by Springsteen, Jon Landau, Steven Van Zandt, and Chuck Plotkin, and recorded in New York City with the E Street Band over two years between January 1982 and March 1984. Some of the songs originated from the demo tape from Springsteen's previous album Nebraska (1982). The recording sessions yielded between 70 and 90 songs; some were released as B-sides, others saw release on compilation albums, while a number remain unreleased.

Born in the U.S.A.'s sound is more pop-influenced than Springsteen's earlier albums. Its production is typical of mainstream 1980s rock music, with heavy use of synthesizers and a prominent snare drum. The lyrics contrast with the album's lively sound and continue the themes explored on previous records, particularly Nebraska. Topics include working-class struggles, disillusionment, patriotism, and personal relationships, although some tracks contain humorous lyrics. The cover photograph of Springsteen from behind against a backdrop of the American flag has appeared on lists of the best album covers.

The album was launched with an extensive promotional campaign that included seven singles, five music videos, and three dance remixes. It was a worldwide commercial success and became the best-selling album of 1985, topping the charts in nine countries, including the U.S. and the U.K. All of the singles, including "Dancing in the Dark", "Born in the U.S.A.", "I'm on Fire", and "Glory Days", reached the U.S. top ten. The album has sold over 30 million copies worldwide, making it Springsteen's best-selling album and one of the best-selling albums of all time. On its release, critics praised the album's storytelling and musical performances. Springsteen and the E Street Band supported the album on the worldwide Born in the U.S.A. Tour (1984–1985).

Born in the U.S.A. transformed Springsteen into a worldwide superstar. The album helped to popularize American heartland rock and influenced later artists who wanted to mimic its power and impact. In later decades, publications such as Rolling Stone and NME ranked it as one of Springsteen's best albums and of all time. Born in the U.S.A. was inducted into the Grammy Hall of Fame in 2012. However, Springsteen later expressed reservations about the album and the fame it brought him, and the lessons from its success have since influenced his career path and musical choices.

== Background ==
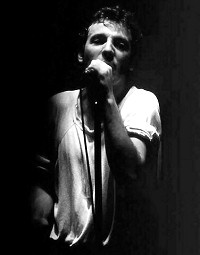
Springsteen in 1981

Following the conclusion of the River Tour in September 1981, Bruce Springsteen rented a ranch in Colts Neck, New Jersey, While there, he wrote new material, including the song "Vietnam" about a Vietnam veteran returning to an apathetic community. During the tour, Springsteen had read Born on the Fourth of July, a 1976 autobiography by Ron Kovic, an anti-war activist who was wounded and paralyzed during the Vietnam War. Kovic's story inspired Springsteen to meet with veterans of the war in Los Angeles, which in turn inspired several tracks that center on themes about the Vietnam War, including "Vietnam", "Shut Out the Light", "A Good Man Is Hard to Find (Pittsburgh)", "Highway Patrolman", and "Brothers Under the Bridges".

As Springsteen developed "Vietnam", the director Paul Schrader asked him to write music for a planned (but ultimately abandoned) film Born in the U.S.A. The screenplay centered on a Cleveland factory worker who plays guitar in a bar band at night. Springsteen revised the lyrics and music of "Vietnam", using the film's title to create "Born in the U.S.A." Schrader eventually made the film but retitled it Light of Day, which was released in 1987; Springsteen provided its title song.

Using a four-track tape recorder, Springsteen demoed tracks written in the bedroom of his Colts Neck house between December 17, 1981, and January 3, 1982. These included "Born in the U.S.A.", "Nebraska", "Atlantic City", "Mansion on the Hill", "Downbound Train", and "Child Bride". Between February and March, Springsteen demoed further tracks, including "Wages of Sin", "Your Love is All Around Me", "Baby I'm So Cold", and "Fade to Black".

== Recording history ==
=== Initial sessions and Nebraska ===
In late January 1982, weeks after recording the demos in Colts Neck, Springsteen and the E Street Band – Roy Bittan (piano), Clarence Clemons (saxophone), Danny Federici (organ), Garry Tallent (bass), Steven Van Zandt (guitar), and Max Weinberg (drums) – were at the Hit Factory in New York City recording a session for Gary U.S. Bonds' album On the Line, for which Springsteen had written seven songs and was co-producing with Van Zandt. During the session, the band recorded "Cover Me", a song Springsteen had written for Donna Summer. His manager-producer Jon Landau convinced Springsteen to keep it for his next album after hearing the finished recording; Springsteen subsequently wrote Summer another song, "Protection", and likewise recorded a version of that song with the E Street Band.

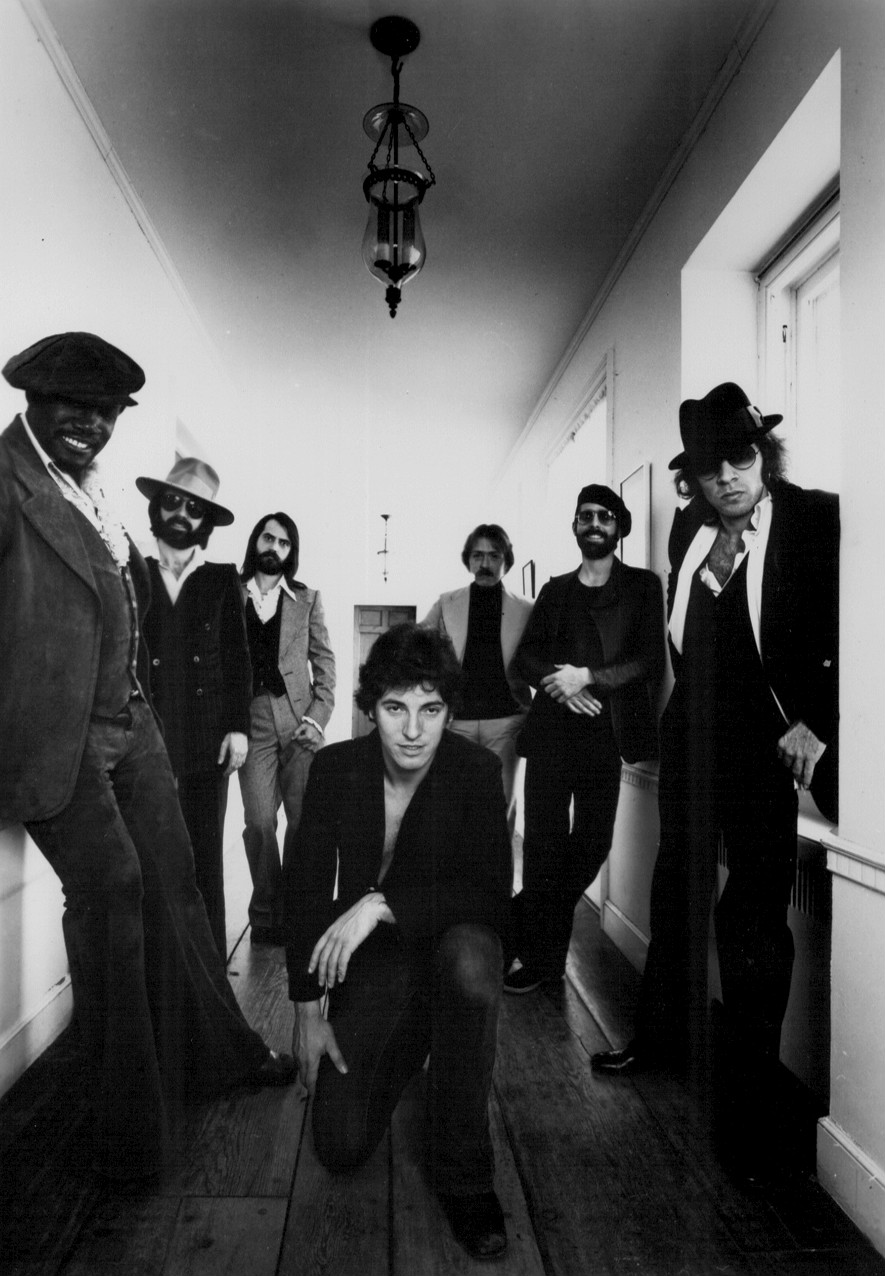
Springsteen (center, kneeling) and the E Street Band in February 1977

In April, Springsteen and the E Street Band regrouped at the Power Station in New York City, where The River (1980) had been recorded. There, he attempted to rerecord some of the Colts Neck demos as full-band versions for release on the next album. Production was handled by Springsteen, Landau, Van Zandt, and The River's mixer Chuck Plotkin, while Toby Scott returned from the Hit Factory sessions as engineer. The band spent two weeks attempting full-band arrangements of the Colts Neck tracks, including "Nebraska", "Johnny 99", and "Mansion on the Hill", but Springsteen and his co-producers were dissatisfied with the recordings. Plotkin has described the performances with E Street as "less meaningful ... less compelling ... less honest" than the demo recordings.

Other songs from the tape, including "Born in the U.S.A.", "Downbound Train", "Child Bride" (now rewritten as "Working on the Highway"), and "Pink Cadillac", proved successful in full-band arrangements. According to the author Dave Marsh, the night the band recorded "Born in the U.S.A." was when "they knew they'd really begun making an album". Over the next few weeks into May, the band's productivity increased as they recorded material absent from the Colts Neck tape, including "Darlington County", (Note: Originally written during the sessions for Darkness on the Edge of Town in 1978) "Frankie", "Glory Days", "I'm Goin' Down", "I'm on Fire", "Johnny Bye-Bye", "Murder Incorporated", "My Love Will Not Let You Down", "A Good Man Is Hard to Find (Pittsburgh)", "This Hard Land", "None but the Brave", and "Wages of Sin". (Note: Other songs included "Baby I'm So Cold", "Jesse James and Robert Ford", "Fade to Black", "True Love is Hard to Come By", "Your Love is All Around Me", "William Davis", "A Gun In Every Home", and "On the Prowl".) A new recording of "Cover Me" was also made. (Note: According to Margotin and Guesdon, the January recording was the take used for the final album, while Clinton Heylin states that Springsteen used one of the nine takes recorded on May 12.) According to Weinberg, these sessions featured little rehearsal as the band went through songs without knowing them fully, often in fewer than five takes.

Despite the band's productivity and excitement about the recorded material, Springsteen remained focused on the rest of the Colts Neck songs. Realizing the tracks would not work in full-band arrangements, he decided to release the demos as is. Springsteen briefly considered releasing a double album of acoustic and electric songs before deciding to release the acoustic ones on their own to give them "greater stature". (Note: The tentative tracklist for the E Street album, dated June 1982, was as follows: Side one: "Born in the U.S.A.", "Murder Incorporated", "Downbound Train", "Down Down Down" (an early title of "I'm Goin' Down"), "Glory Days", "My Love Will Not Let You Down" Side two: "Working on the Highway", "Darlington County", "Frankie", "I'm on Fire", "This Hard Land") The album, Nebraska, was released in September 1982. It featured nine songs from the original demo tape, and "My Father's House", recorded at Colts Neck in late May. The album sold well, reaching number three in the U.S. and the U.K. charts. According to the pop culture scholar Gillian G. Gaar, music critics praised the album as "a brave artistic statement". Springsteen did not promote the album; he conducted no interviews and, for the first time after an album release, did not tour, instead vacationing on a cross-country road trip to California.

=== Further demos and continued sessions ===
In late 1982, Springsteen and his guitar tech Mike Batlan built an eight-track studio in the former's new Los Angeles home. There, he spent time recording new demos that were similar in style to Nebraska, albeit with a drum machine. Songs demoed from January to April 1983 include "Shut Out the Light", "Johnny Bye-Bye", "Cynthia", "Unsatisfied Heart", "Sugarland", "The Klansman", "My Hometown", "Delivery Man", and "Follow That Dream", a reworking of the 1962 Elvis Presley single of the same name. (Note: Attributed to multiple references:) Like the Nebraska tracks, Springsteen felt the new material would not work in a band setting. While he considered releasing another solo acoustic album, he ultimately dismissed the idea. During this period, Springsteen made numerous lifestyle changes, including therapy and working on his physique with a weight-training program. At the end of April, he departed California and traveled back to New York to record more material with the E Street Band.

Springsteen and the E Street Band reconvened at the Hit Factory between May and June 1983. The sessions included re-recordings of recently demoed solo material ("Cynthia" and "My Hometown"), as well as new tracks such as "Pink Cadillac", "Car Wash", "TV Movie", "Stand on It", and "County Fair". These were the first sessions without Van Zandt, who departed the E Street Band in June the year prior and had started a solo career, performing under the name Little Steven. According to the author Fred Goodman, Van Zandt departed due to personal clashes with Landau, although other sources state Van Zandt had felt trapped in the E Street Band and was ready to perform solo. By the summer of 1983, Van Zandt was touring supporting his second solo album, Voice of America. Springsteen's friendship with Van Zandt inspired two new songs, "Bobby Jean" and "No Surrender".

By July 1983, Springsteen and his co-producers had over fifty tracks to choose from for the album, tentatively titled Murder Incorporated. (Note: This tracklist, dated July 1983, was as follows: Side one: "Born in the U.S.A.", "Cynthia", "None But the Brave", "Drop on Down and Cover Me" (a new version of "Cover Me"), "Shut Out the Light", "Johnny Bye-Bye" Side two: "Sugarland", "My Love Will Not Let You Down", "Follow That Dream", "My Hometown", "Glory Days", "Janey, Don't You Lose Heart") The recorded tracks encompassed numerous styles, including R&B ("Lion's Den", "Pink Cadillac"), rockabilly ("Stand on It", "Delivery Man"), hard rock ("Murder Incorporated", "My Love Will Not Let You Down"), and country and folk ("This Hard Land", "County Fair", "None but the Brave"). At the end of July, Springsteen asked Plotkin to develop a rough mix of the album that included "Born in the U.S.A.", "Glory Days", "My Hometown", "Downbound Train", "Follow That Dream", "Shut Out the Light", "My Love Will Not Let You Down", and "Sugarland". Plotkin dismissed the tentative list as "a conceptual mess"; he felt the album should begin with "Born in the U.S.A.", end with "My Hometown", and include "Working on the Highway" and "I'm on Fire".

=== Final recording and mixing ===
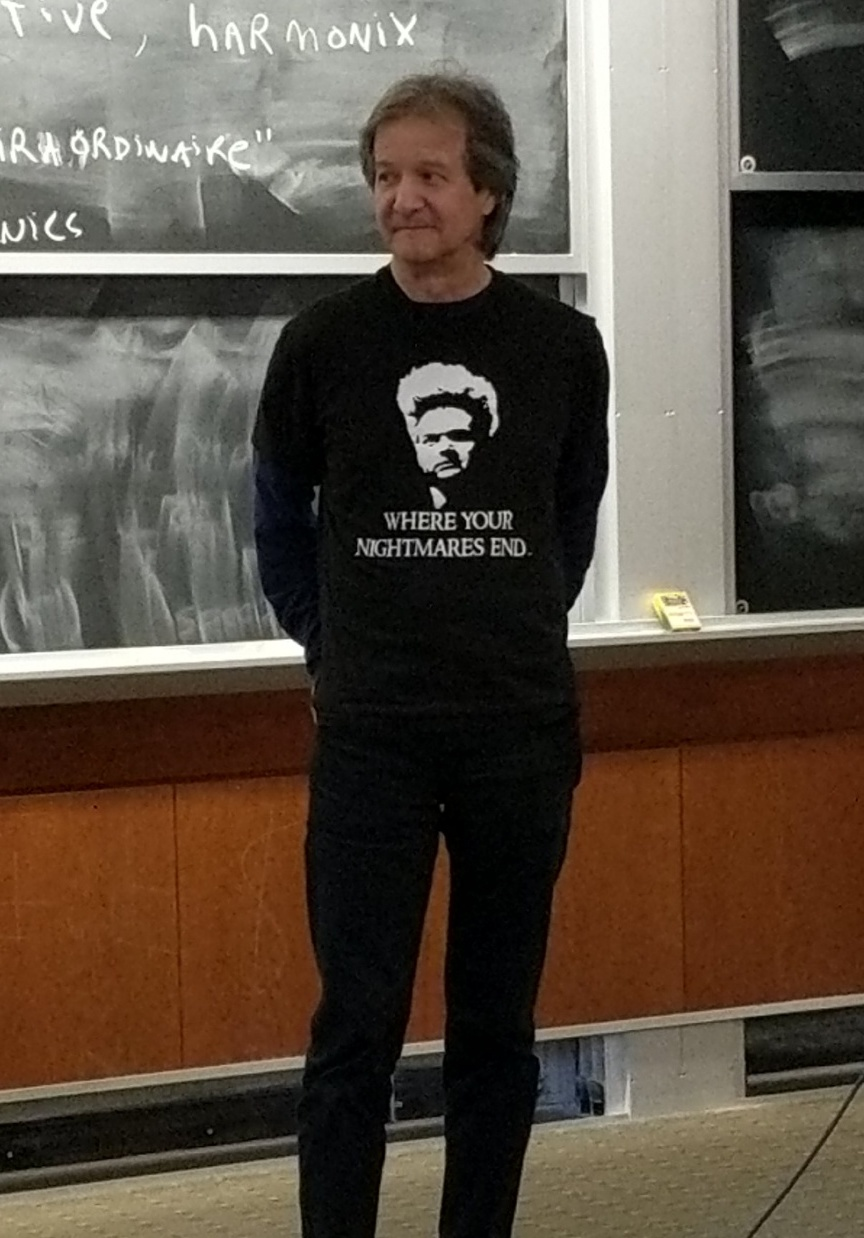
Born in the U.S.A. was mixed by Bob Clearmountain (pictured in 2017).

Springsteen was still unhappy with the recordings as the sessions continued into the new year. Mixing began with Bob Clearmountain, who had mixed The River's "Hungry Heart". The band recorded "Bobby Jean" and "No Surrender" in October 1983, and that November put down "Brothers Under the Bridge" and other unreleased songs, including "Shut Down" and "100 Miles From Jackson". Landau had grown tired of the prolonged recording sessions but remained supportive of Springsteen's vision. By December, Springsteen and his co-producers had tentatively settled on "Born in the U.S.A.", "Glory Days", "Downbound Train", and "This Hard Land" as final choices for inclusion. Born in the U.S.A. was decided upon as the album title by January 1984. The same month, the band recorded "Rockaway the Days" and "Man at the Top".

By February, Landau still felt the album was missing a lead single good enough to break Springsteen into the mainstream. After arguments with his producer, Springsteen introduced "Dancing in the Dark" the following day. The sessions ended in March. Springsteen struggled with the final track-list, but was convinced by Landau and Plotkin to stick with a selection of material largely from the May 1982 sessions. He wrote in his 2016 autobiography Born to Run that he had "recorded a lot of music ... But in the end, I circled back to my original groups of songs. There I found a naturalism and aliveness that couldn't be argued with." He had selected eleven songs by that April. When Van Zandt heard the final track listing, he urged Springsteen to include "No Surrender", as he felt it acted as a bridge between Springsteen's earlier and current works. Springsteen complied, bringing the final track count to twelve. The album was mastered by Bob Ludwig at Masterdisk in New York City.

=== Outtakes ===
After over two years of recording, the Born in the U.S.A. sessions yielded between 70 and 90 songs. Five were released as B-sides between 1984 and 1985: "Pink Cadillac", "Shut Out the Light", "Johnny Bye-Bye", "Stand on It", and "Janey, Don't You Lose Heart". All five later appeared on the 1998 compilation album Tracks. Other outtakes that appeared on Tracks included "A Good Man Is Hard to Find (Pittsburgh)", "Wages of Sin", "Cynthia", "My Love Will Not Let You Down", "This Hard Land", "Frankie", "TV Movie", "Lion's Den", "Car Wash", "Rockaway the Days", "Brothers under the Bridge" (titled "Brothers Under the Bridges '83"), and "Man at the Top". "Murder Incorporated" was released on Greatest Hits (1995), (Note: A re-recording of "This Hard Land" also appeared on Greatest Hits.) while "County Fair" and "None but the Brave" appeared on the limited edition bonus disc of The Essential Bruce Springsteen (2003).

The songs recorded in early 1983 in Springsteen's Los Angeles home that had previously appeared on bootlegs were officially released in June 2025 as part of the box set Tracks II: The Lost Albums. Titled LA Garage Sessions '83, the album features eighteen songs including "Sugarland", "Richfield Whistle", "Don't Back Down", "Follow That Dream", "Fugitive's Dream", "Seven Tears", "One Love", and "The Klansman".

== Music and themes ==
Born in the U.S.A. is a rock and roll, heartland rock, and pop album, with elements of folk and rockabilly. (Note: See specific sources for attribution: Rock and roll; heartland rock; pop; elements of folk and rockabilly.) The album's sound and production are characteristic of mid-1980s mainstream rock, featuring prominent synthesizers, "slamming" guitars, "massive" drums, and "front-and-center" vocals. (Note: Attributed to multiple references:) A number of contemporary reviewers noted that although Springsteen added electronic textures he retained his rock and roll roots. According to the author Geoffrey Himes, the album is unified by "pop pleasure", and that songs such as "Born in the U.S.A.", "Glory Days", "Dancing in the Dark", "I'm Goin' Down", and "I'm on Fire" were earworms, featuring melodies and rhythms that "resonated with emotions as basic as lust, loneliness, anger, and yearning and gave them shape". Most of the songs are built around only two or three chords.

My Born in the U.S.A. songs were direct and fun and stealthily carried the undercurrents of Nebraska.

— Bruce Springsteen, Born to Run, 2016

Critics have described a progression of the characters and their struggles on Born in the U.S.A. from those on his previous albums. AllMusic's William Ruhlmann argues that following their journeys through Springsteen's first six albums, from being passionate youths to centering their attention on work life to feeling discouragement on Nebraska, the characters on his seventh album were alive with a resolve to succeed. For the author Peter Ames Carlin, both Nebraska and Born in the U.S.A. describe troubled times, but on the latter there is more focus on themes including love and on seeking some kind of happiness. Springsteen's characters on the album are married, in their mid-'30s, and dealing with parenthood and recession. Ruhlmann and others have heard humor on Born in the U.S.A. or in its characters; like Carlin, Consequence of Sound's Gabriel Fine identifies overlapping thematic elements with Nebraska, such as working-class characters who face life challenges, but notes that humor distinguishes Born in the U.S.A. from its predecessor. By contrast, the main theme throughout Born in the U.S.A. for Stephen Holden is "the decline of small-town working class life in a post-industrial society". Holden opines that against the mostly upbeat music is "a sad and serious album about the end of the American dream – of economic hope and security, and of community – for a dwindling segment of our society."

=== Side one ===
"Born in the U.S.A."
The production of "Born in the U.S.A." is characteristic of mid-1980s rock, which emphasized synthesizers, pounding drums, and loud vocals. The song's lyrics, which dissect the mistreatment of Vietnam veterans upon their return home after the war, have been widely misinterpreted.

"Born in the U.S.A." is an energetic, rock and roll protest song driven by synthesizer and pounding drums. (Note: Attributed to multiple references:) The track dissects the mistreatment of Vietnam veterans upon their return home after the war. Its message is widely regarded as misunderstood, as many Americans, including president Ronald Reagan, interpreted it as a patriotic anthem; several critics also noted how the song could be misconstrued in favor of jingoism. Margotin and Guesdon discuss the juxtaposition of the verses, which convey "the somber reality of a soldier", with the chorus which "loudly and proudly proclaims the glory of American civilization". AllMusic's Mike DeGayne argued that while the song would have been effective as an acoustic ballad, similar to "My Hometown" or Nebraska's "Atlantic City", "it's the fervor and the might of Springsteen in front of a bombastic array of guitar and drums that help to drive his message home".

"Cover Me" is a straightforward rock song, with elements of pop, disco, and funk. Lyrically, it describes a love story wherein the narrator, suffering from post-traumatic stress disorder, pleas for his lover to stay with him and protect him from the outside world. "Darlington County" is an upbeat rock song that some critics compared to the music of Creedence Clearwater Revival. It tells the story of two New York friends who embark on a road trip. They come to Darlington, South Carolina to work, but end up spending much of their time with women. The author Rob Kirkpatrick said the song was "steeped in countrified blue-collarism".

The rockabilly "Working on the Highway" sets upbeat music against downbeat lyrics. It tells the story of a man who runs away to Florida with an underage girl against her father's wishes. When he gets there, he is arrested and sentenced to forced labor. Originally "Child Bride" from the Nebraska demo tape, the final track retains the same story and several lines from the original lyrics.

"Downbound Train" is a minimalist rock ballad featuring a synthesizer. The lyrics include themes of disillusionment and loss; Billboard's Caryn Rose called it the album's saddest song. It follows a man who has lost everything: after being laid off from his lumberyard job, his wife leaves him, after which he struggles to make a living working at a car wash. Distressed, he dreams of his now ex-wife. The song's narrator is similar to the ones on Nebraska and "Stolen Car" from The River.

"I'm on Fire" is a minimalist ballad whose instrumentation consists of picked guitar, synthesizer, and brushed drums. Musically inspired by Johnny Cash, the song is an ode to adulterous lust, in which the narrator expresses an obsessive and uncontrollable desire for the heroine. Analyzing the song's placement in the track listing at the end of side one, Fine wrote that the song leaves "a hushed, solemn interlude in the center of a mostly upbeat, ebullient album", further arguing that "it seems symbolic, both structurally and musically, as if marking a turning point in Springsteen's career from middle-America heartland rocker to synth- and dance-influenced mainstream star."

=== Side two ===
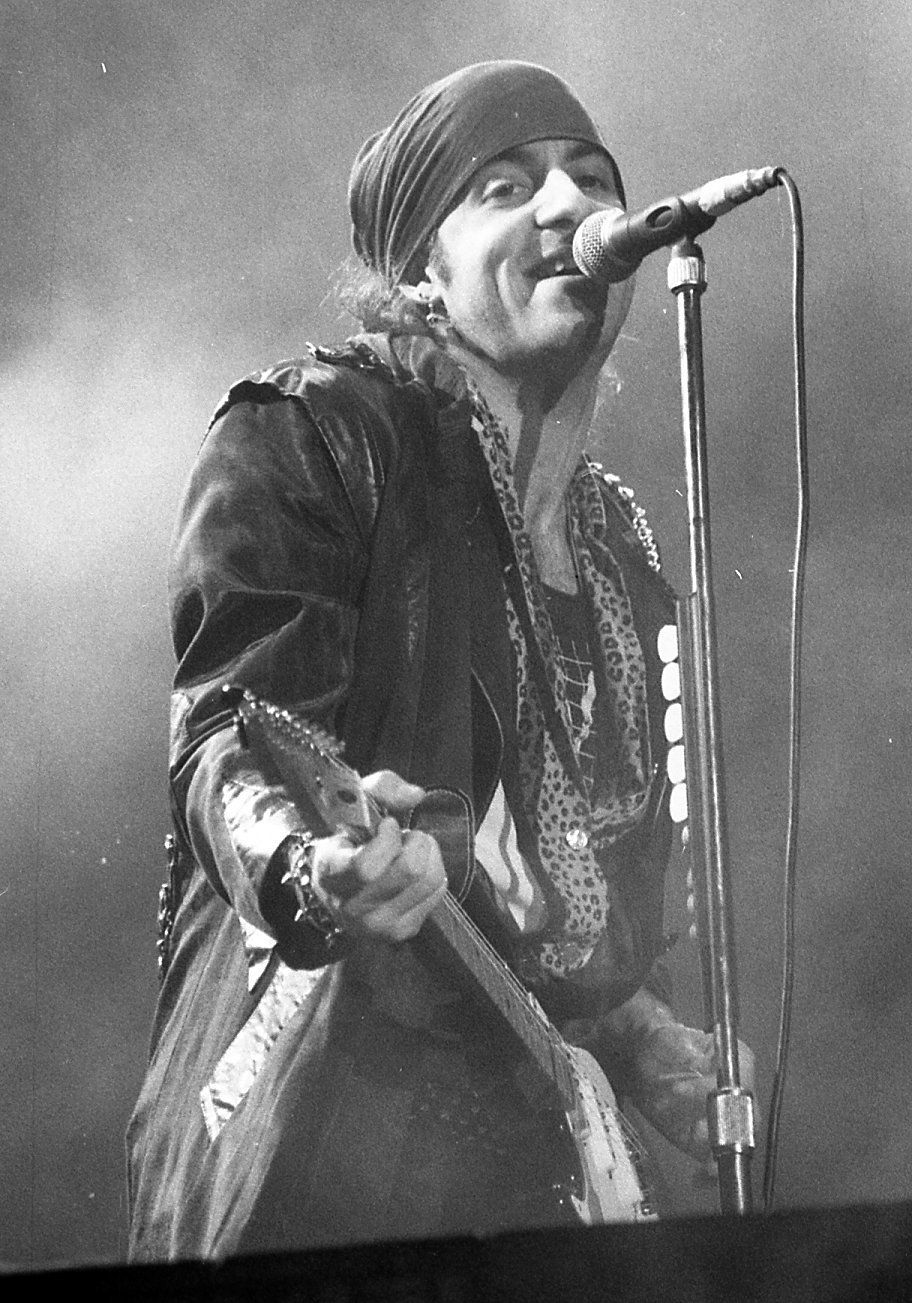
Springsteen wrote "No Surrender" and "Bobby Jean" as tributes to his friend, the guitarist Steven Van Zandt (pictured in 1983), who had departed the E Street Band in June 1982.

"No Surrender" is an upbeat 1950s/1960s-style rock song with a "dense, rich, and heavy sound". The lyrics are a statement of friendship, freedom, and in Kirkpatrick's words "youthful defiance with allusions to blood brotherhood and forced warlike metaphors". The song is complemented by "Bobby Jean", another song about friendship. In it, the narrator visits the childhood home of the title character, causing his memories of them to come back in a nostalgic tone. Commentators have interpreted the title character's gender as intentionally ambiguous; they could refer to any close friend the singer had known since he was a teenager. Musically, it is a rock and roll ballad with an accented rhythm and near-dance groove. (Note: Rock and roll; ballad; rhythm and near-dance groove.)

"I'm Goin' Down" is a rock song with elements of rockabilly. Its upbeat music contrasts with the lyrics, which tell a melancholic story about a couple on the verge of a break-up. The narrator's girlfriend has lost her passion and turned to indifference.

"Glory Days" is an energetic synth-rock song that follows a protagonist speaking with old high-school classmates – a former baseball star and a popular girl now divorced with two kids – in a bar reflecting on the "glory days" of their youth with sadness. It was partially based on a true story of Springsteen meeting an old friend at a bar who had had the potential to become a professional baseball player in the early 1970s. Some commentators have argued the song opposes nostalgia rather than embracing it, as the protagonist pities the former high school heroes.

"Dancing in the Dark" is an upbeat synth-pop and dance-rock song. (Note: Upbeat; synth-pop; Dance-rock.) Its protagonist struggles with life – he is bored with himself, cannot look at himself in a mirror, and feels trapped – and wants to change his daily routine by finding a spark that will reignite his imagination. Kirkpatrick has argued the song examines its author's creative process, showing Springsteen struggling to live up to expectations as both a songwriter and a performer. The song ends with a jazzy saxophone solo from Clemons.

"My Hometown" is a folk ballad driven by a synthesizer. Throughout its four verses, the narrator grows from child to adult and experiences hardship living in his hometown. Based on Springsteen's personal experiences growing up in the 1960s, the song returns to the social issues raised in the album's first side, with themes centered on working-class life, racial tensions, violence and economic strife. Pitchfork's Sam Sodomsky has argued the song "captures what Born in the U.S.A. failed to: the tragedy of the American dream, the brutality and injustice that is fundamental to American citizenship, and the complicated, intractable love for one's home that still manages to take root in the midst of it all."

== Artwork ==
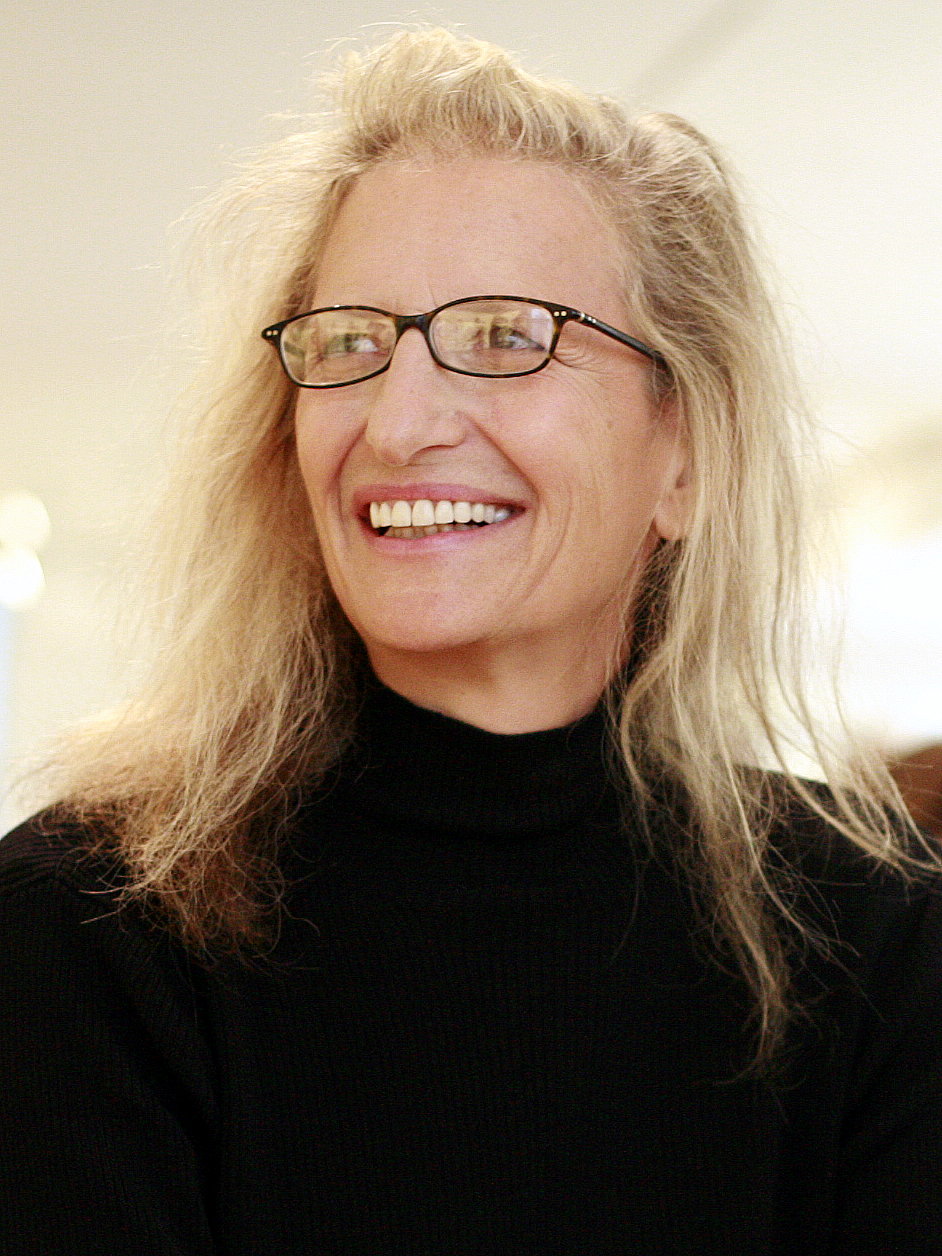
The cover photograph was taken by the photographer Annie Leibovitz (pictured in 2008).

The cover photograph shows Springsteen with his back to the camera against the stripes of an American flag. He wears a white T-shirt and jeans, with a red baseball cap tucked into his right back pocket. The cap belonged to the recently deceased father of his friend Lance Larson. Springsteen has said that the flag was included because the first track was called "Born in the U.S.A." and the song's overarching theme reflected his writing of the past six or seven years. The cover became controversial; some commentators believed Springsteen was urinating on the flag, which he denied, telling Kurt Loder in Rolling Stone that there was no "secret message" and that "the picture of my ass looked better than the picture of my face". The cover, designed by Andrea Klein, is one of the few of Springsteen's studio album covers that do not show his face.

The photograph was taken by the portrait photographer Annie Leibovitz. She did not like the photo, and viewed it as a "grab shot". Other photographs by Leibovitz were used for promotional material, such as the cover for "Dancing in the Dark" single (capturing Springsteen jumping mid-air wearing a blue shirt, black leather jacket, and black pants) and the Born in the U.S.A. tour program (depicting Springsteen jumping in front of the American flag, wielding a guitar in a Pete Townshend-like windmill pose).

The inner sleeve contains black-and-white photographs of Springsteen, the E Street Band, and song lyrics. It includes Springsteen's farewell words to Van Zandt in Italian: Buon viaggio, mio fratello, Little Steven ("Safe travels, my brother, Little Steven"). The cover has appeared on Billboard and Rolling Stone's lists of the 100 best album covers of all time at numbers 31 and 42, respectively.

== Release and promotion ==
Columbia Records released Born in the U.S.A. on June 4, 1984. The album was the first compact disc manufactured in the United States for commercial release. It was manufactured by CBS (Columbia's international distributor) and Sony Music at their newly opened plant, Digital Audio Disc Corporation, in Terre Haute, Indiana, in September; Columbia's CDs were previously manufactured in Japan.

Born in the U.S.A. debuted at number nine on the U.S. Billboard Top 200 Albums chart during the week of June 23, 1984, topping the chart two weeks later, on July 7. It stayed in the top 10 for 84 consecutive weeks and on the chart itself for almost three years. It was also a commercial success in Europe and Oceania. In the United Kingdom, the album entered the UK Albums Chart at number two on June 16, and after 34 weeks, on February 16, 1985, it reached number one and topped the chart for five non-consecutive weeks; it was present on the chart for 135 weeks. It also topped the album charts in Australia, Austria, Germany, the Netherlands, New Zealand, Norway, Sweden, and Switzerland. (Note: Attributed to multiple references:) The album reached number two in France, Italy, Spain, and on the European Top 100 Albums chart. It also reached number six in Japan.

Born in the U.S.A. was the best-selling album of 1985 and of Springsteen's career. It is one of the best-selling albums of all time, with worldwide sales of over 30 million copies. It was certified three times platinum by the British Phonographic Industry (BPI) in July 1985, denoting shipments of 900,000 units in the U.K. After the advent of the North American Nielsen SoundScan tracking system in 1991, the album sold an additional 1,463,000 copies, and in May 2022, it was certified seventeen times platinum by the Recording Industry Association of America (RIAA) for shipments of 17 million copies in the U.S.

=== Singles ===
By 1984, the music industry had become reliant on singles and music videos for success following the rise of MTV in the U.S. With the success of Michael Jackson's Thriller (1982), record labels wanted to turn albums into "mega-albums". The music industry historian Steve Kropper has said that Thriller created a "video-driven blueprint" to keep an album high in the charts for at least an entire year. Springsteen and Landau had only envisioned one or two singles from Born in the U.S.A. Feeling otherwise, Columbia planned "at least half a dozen" possible singles, each accompanied by dance remixes and music videos to broaden airplay, both on the radio and in clubs. Sodomsky later wrote: "MTV had evolved into a legitimate arm of the music industry, and Springsteen's new look [muscular with a bandana] helped him gain traction in an image-centric medium." Springsteen also conducted interviews with media outlets including People and Entertainment Weekly.

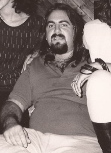
The producer Arthur Baker (pictured in 1984) created extended dance remixes of three of the album's seven singles.

Born in the U.S.A. was supported by a record-tying seven top ten singles. (Note: Tied with Michael Jackson's Thriller and Janet Jackson's Rhythm Nation 1814 (1989)) The first, "Dancing in the Dark" with "Pink Cadillac" on the B-side, was released on May 9, 1984. It peaked at number two on the U.S. Billboard Hot 100 and spent 21 weeks on the chart. Elsewhere, it topped the singles charts in Canada, the Netherlands, and Belgium, and also reached number four in the U.K. The 12" single featured three dance remixes of "Dancing in the Dark" by the producer Arthur Baker; it was the best-selling 12" single of the year. "Cover Me", featuring a 1981 live recording of Tom Waits' "Jersey Girl" as the B-side, was released as the second single on July 31. It spent 18 weeks on the Billboard Hot 100, reaching number seven, as well as number two on Billboard's Mainstream Rock chart. A dance remix by Baker appeared on a 12" single. "Born in the U.S.A.", backed by "Shut Out the Light", was issued as the third single on October 30. It spent 17 weeks on the Billboard Hot 100, reaching number nine. Elsewhere, it topped the charts in Ireland and New Zealand, and peaked at number two in Australia, and number five in the U.K. A dance remix by Baker appeared on a 12" single in January 1985.

"I'm on Fire", backed by "Johnny Bye-Bye", was released as the fourth single on February 6, 1985. It peaked at number six on the Billboard Hot 100 and remained on the chart for 20 weeks. "Glory Days" followed on May 13, with "Stand on It" as the B-side. It spent 18 weeks on the Billboard Hot 100, peaking at number five. The sixth single, "I'm Goin' Down", was issued on August 27, backed by "Janey, Don't You Lose Heart". It reached number nine on the Billboard Hot 100, and also charted in Sweden and Italy. The seventh and final single, "My Hometown", was released on November 21, with a 1975 live recording of the Christmas song "Santa Claus Is Comin' to Town" as the B-side. It reached numbers six and nine in the U.S. and the U.K., respectively. CBS compiled the three extended dance remixes, two other singles, the five exclusive B-sides, and several songs from Springsteen's previous albums for release on The Born in the U.S.A. 12″ Single Collection in the U.K. in 1985.

=== Music videos ===
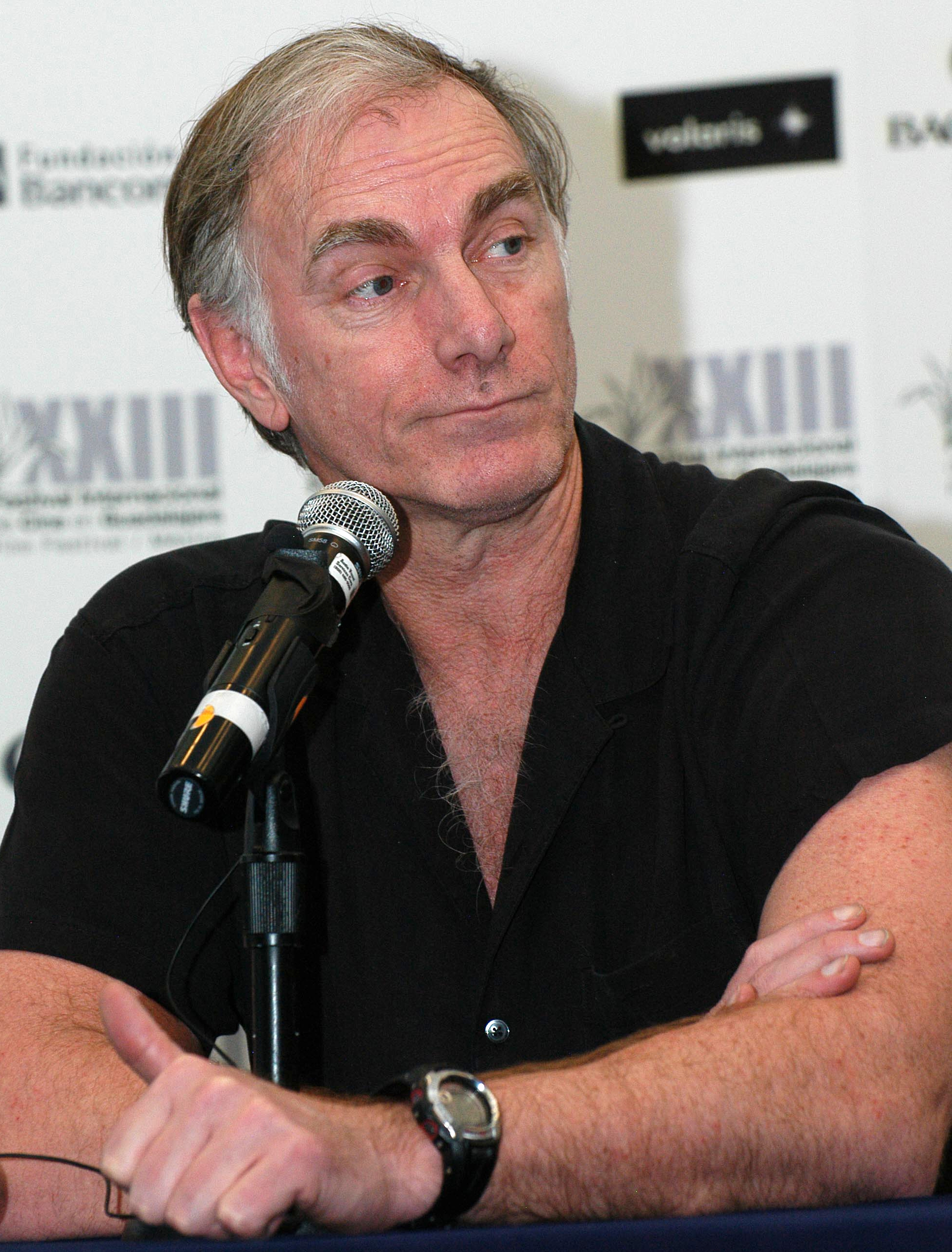
The filmmaker John Sayles (pictured in 2008) directed three of the album's five music videos.

Five of the album's seven singles were supported by music videos. "Dancing in the Dark" contains footage of a live performance at the St. Paul Civic Center in Saint Paul, Minnesota, on June 28 and 29, 1984. The video was directed by Brian De Palma, and contains a scene where Springsteen pulls a young fan, played by the then-unknown actress Courteney Cox, on stage to dance; Springsteen recreated the bit frequently with young female fans throughout the tour. De Palma's video introduced Springsteen to the MTV generation, helping Springsteen to reach a much wider audience. The filmmaker John Sayles directed the videos for "Born in the U.S.A.", "I'm on Fire", and "Glory Days". For the title track, Sayles interspersed concert footage of Springsteen singing the song, shot in Los Angeles in 1984, with footage of small-town America. (Note: The video featured a recreation of the Born in the U.S.A. cover photo.)

For the "I'm on Fire" video, Springsteen plays an auto mechanic captivated by a young woman in a white dress. The video won the award for Best Male Video at the 1985 MTV Video Music Awards. The video for "Glory Days" starred Springsteen as the song's titular baseball player, working on a construction site and practicing baseball pitches alone, reflecting on his "glory days". It transitions to a performance of the song at a club with the E Street Band, featuring both Steven Van Zandt and his replacement guitarist Nils Lofgren, alongside new backing vocalist Patti Scialfa. The video ends with Springsteen's character playing a game of catch with his son until his wife, played by Springsteen's first wife Julianne Phillips, picks them up. The video for "My Hometown" depicts a live performance of the song. It was directed by Arthur Rosato and was shot towards the end of the tour at the Los Angeles Memorial Coliseum.

=== Tour ===
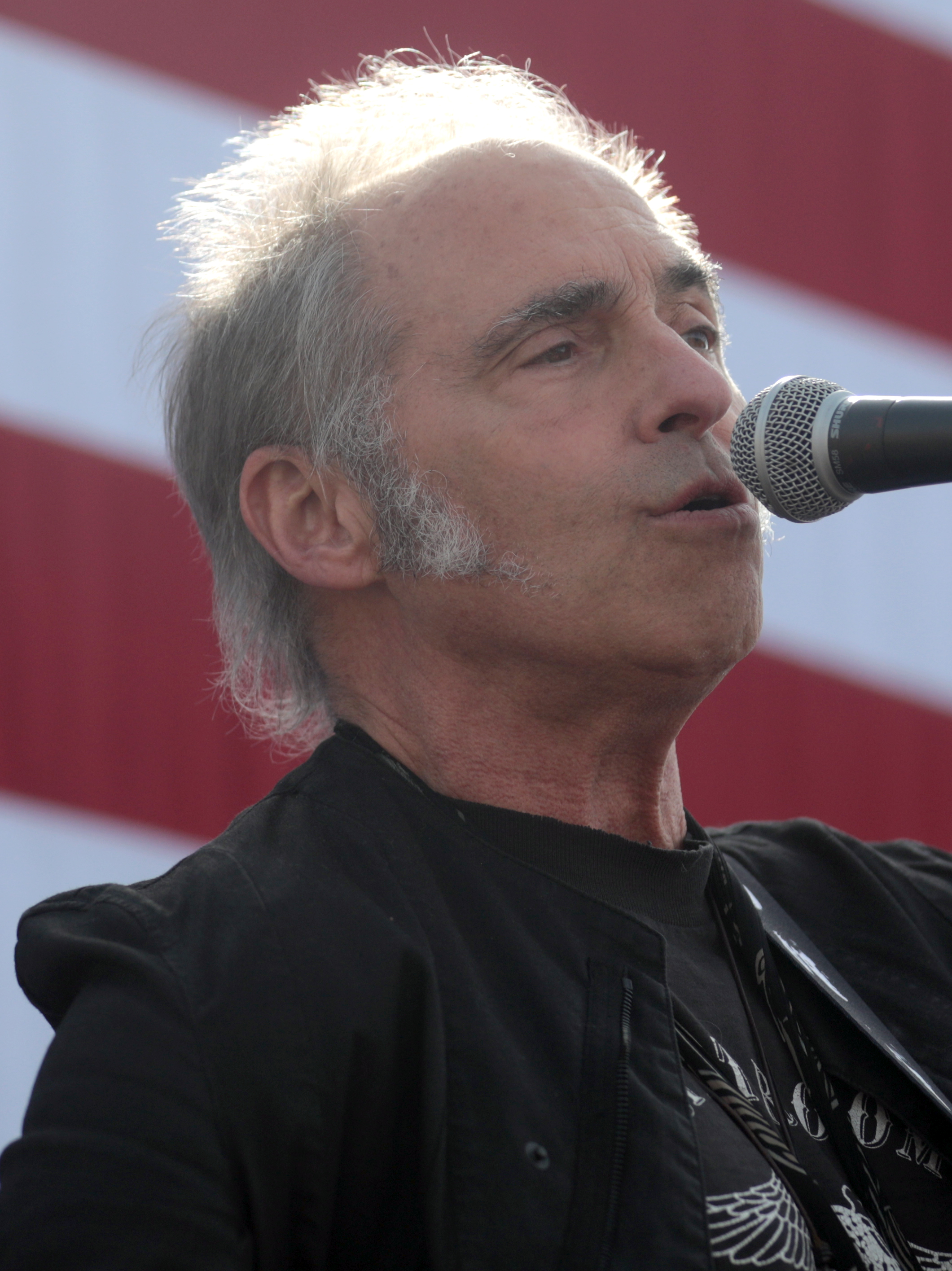
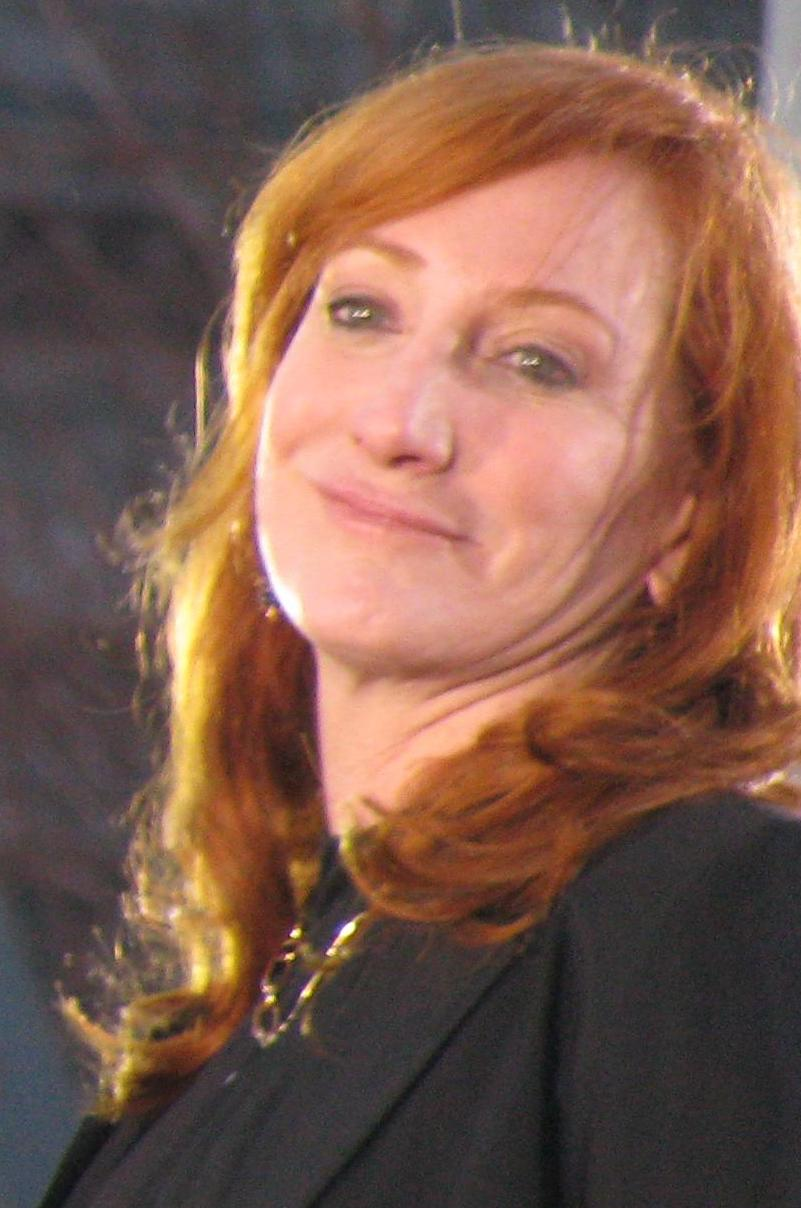
Following the departure of Steven Van Zandt, the Born in the U.S.A. Tour saw the additions of Nils Lofgren (left, in 2019) and Patti Scialfa (right, in 2008) to the E Street Band.

The Born in the U.S.A. Tour consisted of 156 dates between m June 29, 1984, and October 2, 1985. Rehearsals began in early May 1984 at a point when the E Street Band had not performed together in two and a half years. The lineup included returning members Bittan, Clemons, Tallent, Federici, Weinberg; Nils Lofgren (who replaced Van Zandt as a second guitarist) and Patti Scialfa, who was hired by Springsteen as a backing vocalist four days before the tour began. Springsteen reworked his image to be "highly masculinized"; he wore sleeveless shirts to show his new muscular physique, was clean-shaven and held his curly hair up with a bandana.

The tour began in Saint Paul, Minnesota, where the video for "Dancing in the Dark" was filmed. The shows consisted of material spanning Springsteen's whole career. He often opened the shows with tracks from "Born in the U.S.A." or "Thunder Road" (1975). The second set was primarily songs written after Nebraska's release, such as "Dancing in the Dark", "No Surrender", and "Bobby Jean". Unlike previous tours, the set lists for the Born in the U.S.A. Tour typically remained the same every night, with few exceptions.

Springsteen attracted political attention during the initial U.S. leg when the conservative political commentator George Will attended the show in Largo, Maryland, on August 25. Will published a column in The Washington Post about Springsteen the following month, wherein he praised the performer's work ethic and discussed his "presumed patriotism" with the usage of the phrase "born in the U.S.A." Less than a week after the column's publishing, President Ronald Reagan, in the middle of his reelection campaign, praised Springsteen's "patriotism" during a campaign rally in Hammonton, New Jersey. Springsteen responded dismissively to Reagan's comments two days later during a show in Pittsburgh, and from around this time he began taking time at his shows to talk about his political views. Starting in November, he donated some concert proceeds to local charities or community organizations.

The initial American leg of the tour ran through January 1985. The tour continued from late March to July around the world with shows in Australia, Japan, Europe, and the U.K. Springsteen married Phillips in May, between the Oceania and European legs. The European leg drew large crowds, including a 100,000 attendance in Ireland and three sold-out shows at Wembley Stadium in London. The final U.S. leg ran from August to October 2, ending with four consecutive shows at the Los Angeles Memorial Coliseum. The tour's massive success led to the creation of Springsteen's first live album, Live 1975–85, released in November 1986.

Springsteen and the E Street Band performed the full Born in the U.S.A. album during a show at the Hard Rock Calling Festival in London at Queen Elizabeth Olympic Park on June 30, 2013. A DVD of the full performance, titled Born in the U.S.A. Live: London 2013, was packaged with Amazon pre-orders of Springsteen's 18th studio album High Hopes in January 2014. Besides the 2013 London concert, Springsteen performed the entire Born in the U.S.A. album in 2009 at shows in East Rutherford, New Jersey, and Philadelphia, several other concerts in 2013 including in Munich, Milan, and Rio De Janeiro, and in 2014 in Melbourne and Auckland.

== Critical reception ==
Professional ratings
Initial reviews
Review scores
Source	Rating
Christgau's Record Guide	A (Note: Later ranked A+)
Los Angeles Times	4/4 stars
Record Mirror	2/5 stars
Rolling Stone	5/5 stars
Saturday Review	5/5 stars
Smash Hits	8/10
Sounds	5/5 stars

Born in the U.S.A. was very favorably reviewed on release. It was described as both accessible and containing new musical elements that critics such as Robert Hilburn and Sandy Robertson believed would both please longtime fans and attract a new audience. Writing for Shreveport, Louisiana's The Times, Marshall Fine wrote: "It's a superb effort, an album of rich musical and lyrical textures that can only enhance Springsteen's reputation as a rock 'n' roll original." Some critics described Born in the U.S.A. as a more commercial version of Nebraska, one that is more easily digestible for a wider audience. In Rolling Stone, Debby Miller said Born in the U.S.A. was as well thought-out as Nebraska, but with more sophistication and spirit.

Springsteen's storytelling drew particular attention; Miller saw Springsteen creating "such a vivid sense of these characters" by "[giving] them voices a playwright would be proud of". The trade magazine Cash Box predicted Born in the U.S.A. would find success on album-oriented rock radio due to Springsteen's "special" ability to convey the lyrical messages of every song. Saturday Review's John Swenson commended Springsteen for "championing traditional rock values at a time when few newer bands show interest in such a direction", while Robert Christgau of The Village Voice praised his evolution as an artist. In The New York Times, Stephen Holden highlighted Springsteen as "one of a very small number of rock performers who uses rock to express an ongoing epic vision of [America], individual social roots and the possibility of heroic self-creation." Others praised the instrumentation and vocal performances, and the performances of the E Street Band.

Not all reviews were positive. Several critics noted that the lyrics bore heavily thematic similarities to those on his earlier albums. Richard Harrington of The Washington Post wrote that the "problem is that Springsteen's taken us down these mean side streets and through these badlands all too often since 1978's Darkness on the Edge of Town." Robertson took less issue, arguing that Springsteen was "polishing and perfecting his craft", leading to his best work yet. Critics such as Harrington and the NME's Charles Shaar Murray were more negative and wrote that the music was "deadly dull" and "dry", respectively. According to Harrington, Springsteen had "become a brooding, boorish visionary, with no respite of working class advocacy or the resilient spirit of youth", while Murray argued that "by abandoning all that 'rebel triumphant' blabber'n smoke, Springsteen displays the kind of moral and artistic integrity that rock music rarely shows any more." He summarized: "No-one's going to get high on fantasy or rebellion from listening to Born in the U.S.A."

Born in the U.S.A. was voted the best album of the year in the 1984 Pazz & Jop critics poll. Christgau, the poll's creator, also ranked it number one on his list and in 1990 named it the ninth-best album of the 1980s. NME, in their end-of-the-year list, placed it at number two, behind Bobby Womack's The Poet II. In Rolling Stone, Springsteen and the E Street Band won artist and band of the year, album of the year for Born in the U.S.A., and single and music video of the year for "Dancing in the Dark". At the 27th Annual Grammy Awards in 1985, Born in the U.S.A. was nominated for the Grammy Award for Album of the Year, while "Dancing in the Dark" was nominated for Record of the Year and won the award for Best Rock Vocal Performance, Male. "Born in the U.S.A." was nominated for Record of the Year at the following year's ceremony.

== Legacy ==
Born in the U.S.A. made Springsteen a superstar and was his commercial and critical highpoint, touching off a wave of what the author Chris Smith termed "Bossmania". Although he was already well-known, the critic Larry Rodgers wrote that "it was not until he hit the gym to get buffed up and showed off his rear end in [the] cover photo" that he became an American pop icon". The author Bryan K. Garman suggested that this new image helped Springsteen popularize his persona, while tying him to certain political and socio-cultural issues at a time when Ronald Reagan was promoting prosperity and U.S. global influence "within a decidedly masculine framework". Stereogum's Ryan Leas later called the album "one of the defining records of the '80s".

Born In the U.S.A. changed my life, gave me my largest audience, forced me to think harder about the way I presented my music, and set me briefly at the center of the pop world.

— Bruce Springsteen, Born to Run, 2016

Despite Born in the U.S.A.'s commercial success, Springsteen was wary of his newfound fame. He later expressed reservations about the album, writing in his 2003 book Songs, "I put a lot of pressure on myself over a long period of time to reproduce the intensity of Nebraska ... I never got it." He felt the title track "more or less stood by itself" and that "the rest of the album contains a group of songs about which I've always had some ambivalence". Gabriel Fine argued that a "central" part of the album's legacy is the title track's misunderstood message and the "struggle" to make that message clear. According to Kirkpatrick, the album's legacy is complicated for longtime fans due to its large success and Springsteen's public image of "muscular patriotism" that surrounded its release and accompanying tour. The album also created a generational divide between new fans acquired from its success and fans of Springsteen's older works.

The album's success ultimately influenced Springsteen's career trajectory for the rest of the 1980s and 1990s. In response to his newfound fame, Springsteen attempted to scale himself back to be viewed as a "normal" middle-aged singer-songwriter. He later described the Born in the U.S.A. Tour as representing the end of the first phase of his career, believing he created an "icon" image that was not true to himself. For Tunnel of Love (1987), the follow-up to Born in the U.S.A., he recorded most of the parts himself using a synthesizer and wrote lyrics about love, romantic commitment, and married life. He used the E Street Band sparingly on the album before disbanding the group in 1989. In the 1990s, Springsteen ignored dominant music trends, such as grunge and alternative rock, as he created the music he wanted to make despite being aware of the potential commercial shortcomings. His albums during this period, Human Touch, Lucky Town (both 1992), and The Ghost of Tom Joad (1995), suffered commercially as a result. (Note: Human Touch and Lucky Town both sold well initially, peaking at number two and three, respectively, on the Billboard 200, but competition from other popular artists at the time led to both albums dropping off the charts quickly. The Ghost of Tom Joad was Springsteen's first album since The Wild, the Innocent & the E Street Shuffle (1973) to miss the top five on the Billboard 200, reaching number 11.) The author Steven Hyden argues that it was not until his and the E Street Band's Reunion Tour from 1999 to 2000, and the accompanying Live in New York City film and live album, that Springsteen re-established himself as a cultural icon. The following album, The Rising (2002), was his first full-length album with the E Street Band since Born in the U.S.A. and his first to top the Billboard 200 since Tunnel of Love.

=== Influence ===
Born in the U.S.A. further popularized American heartland rock. By 1985, the album had boosted the profiles of other heartland rock artists and their albums, such as John Mellencamp (Scarecrow), Tom Petty and the Heartbreakers (Southern Accents), Dire Straits (Brothers in Arms), and Bob Seger. Mellencamp, in particular, was accused at the time of being a pale imitation of Springsteen. Born in the U.S.A. helped establish synthesizers as a key component of 1980s rock. According to Hyden, "Born in the U.S.A." and the End of the Heartland which dissects the album and its impact forty years after its release, the album served as an influence for later rock bands who wanted to mimic the album's power and impact, such as the Killers with Sam's Town (2006), Arcade Fire with The Suburbs (2010), the War on Drugs with Lost in the Dream (2014), and Sam Fender with Hypersonic Missiles (2019).

=== Retrospective reviews ===
Professional ratings
Retrospective reviews
Review scores
Source	Rating
AllMusic	5/5 stars
Chicago Tribune	4/4 stars
The Encyclopedia of Popular Music	3/5 stars
The Gazette	2.5/5 stars
MusicHound Rock	4/5
Pitchfork	10/10
Q	2/5 stars
The Rolling Stone Album Guide	5/5 stars

In later decades, Born in the U.S.A. has generally been regarded as one of Springsteen's best records. (Note: Attributed to multiple references:) Sodomsky has called it "the bold, brilliant, and misunderstood apex of Bruce Springsteen's imperial era". To Hyden, Born in the U.S.A. remains Springsteen's most iconic album in the pop-culture zeitgeist and the one that defines his persona the most broadly. The music journalist Matty Karas described a "quintessential pop album that was also a perfect distillation of the anger and bitterness seething beneath the surface of Reagan-era America." Neil McCormick of The Daily Telegraph praised the way that Springsteen "deftly juxtaposed" this anger with a sense of celebration, often within the same track, while producing his most "tightly honed" work.

The album still attracts mixed assessments. While one critic opined the album aged well into the 2000s, others have felt its production dates it to the 1980s, including critics who maintain that this production was made up for by the quality of the songs, or otherwise added "historical value" to the album. More negatively, Q magazine's journalist Richard Williams has criticized Springsteen's exaggeration of his usual characters and themes in a deliberate attempt at commercial success, accusing the singer of irresponsibly using American patriotism and "clenched-fist bombast" to cover up the album's anti-war stance. In a 2003 overview of all the singer's albums, The Gazette's Bernard Perusse wrote of Born in the U.S.A. that "by [Springsteen's] standards, it was a weak batch of songs".

=== Rankings ===
Born in the U.S.A. has appeared on several best-of lists. In 1987 it was voted the fifth greatest rock album of all time in Paul Gambaccini's Critic's Choice poll of 81 critics, writers and radio broadcasters. Rolling Stone ranked it number 85 on their 2003 list of the 500 Greatest Albums of All Time, 86 in a 2012 revised list, and 142 in a 2020 revised list. In 2013, it was named the 428th greatest album in a similar list published by NME. It was included in the 2016 edition of the book 1001 Albums You Must Hear Before You Die.

The album was inducted into the Grammy Hall of Fame in 2012. The year Paste magazine described it as the fourth best album of the 1980s. In 2015, Ultimate Classic Rock included it on a list compiling the best rock albums of the 1980s.

== Reissues ==
Born in the U.S.A. was first reissued by Columbia on CD in 2000, followed by an LP and CD reissue by Sony BMG in 2007 and 2008, respectively. In 2015, Sony Music released a remastered version of the album on both LP and CD. On June 14, 2024, Sony Music reissued the album again on translucent red vinyl, featuring a booklet with new sleeve notes by Springsteen's archivist Erik Flannigan and a lithograph to mark its 40th anniversary.

== Track listing ==
All tracks are written by Bruce Springsteen.

Side one
No.	Title	Length
1.	"Born in the U.S.A."	4:39
2.	"Cover Me"	3:26
3.	"Darlington County"	4:48
4.	"Working on the Highway"	3:11
5.	"Downbound Train"	3:35
6.	"I'm on Fire"	2:36

Side two
No.	Title	Length
1.	"No Surrender"	4:00
2.	"Bobby Jean"	3:46
3.	"I'm Goin' Down"	3:29
4.	"Glory Days"	4:15
5.	"Dancing in the Dark"	4:01
6.	"My Hometown"	4:33
Total length:		46:41

== Personnel ==
According to the liner notes:

- Bruce Springsteen – lead vocals, guitar

The E Street Band

- Roy Bittan – synthesizer, piano, backing vocals
- Clarence Clemons – saxophone, percussion, backing vocals
- Danny Federici – Hammond organ, glockenspiel, piano ("Born in the U.S.A.")
- Garry Tallent – bass guitar, backing vocals
- Steven Van Zandt – acoustic guitar, mandolin, harmony vocals
- Max Weinberg – drums, backing vocals

Additional musicians

- Richie "La Bamba" Rosenberg – backing vocals ("Cover Me" and "No Surrender")
- Ruth Jackson – backing vocals ("My Hometown")

Technical

- Bruce Springsteen, Jon Landau, Chuck Plotkin, Steven Van Zandt – producers
- Toby Scott – engineer
- Bob Clearmountain – mixing
- John Davenport, Jeff Hendrickson, Bruce Lampcov, Billy Straus, Zöe Yanakis – assistant engineers
- Bob Ludwig – mastering
- Bill Scheniman – engineer ("Cover Me")
- Andrea Klein – art direction, design, cover design
- Annie Leibovitz – photography
- David Gahr – additional photography

== Charts ==
=== Weekly charts ===
1984–85 weekly chart performance for Born in the U.S.A.
Chart (1984–85)	Peak position
Australian Albums (Kent Music Report)	1
Austrian Albums (Ö3 Austria)	1
Canada Top Albums/CDs (RPM)	1
Dutch Albums (Album Top 100)	1
European Albums (European Top 100 Albums)	2
French Albums (SNEP)	2
German Albums (Offizielle Top 100)	1
Italian Albums (Musica e Dischi)	2
Japanese Albums (Oricon)	6
New Zealand Albums (RMNZ)	1
Norwegian Albums (VG-lista)	1
Spanish Albums (PROMUSICAE)	2
Swedish Albums (Sverigetopplistan)	1
Swiss Albums (Schweizer Hitparade)	1
UK Albums (Official Charts)	1
US Billboard 200	1
Zimbabwean Albums (ZIMA)	1

2003 weekly chart performance for Born in the U.S.A.
Chart (2003)	Peak position
Belgian Albums (Ultratop Wallonia)	37
Italian Albums (FIMI)	36

2006 weekly chart performance for Born in the U.S.A.
Chart (2006)	Peak position
Spanish Albums (Promusicae)	98

2017 weekly chart performance for Born in the U.S.A.
Chart (2017)	Peak position
Australian Albums (ARIA)	31

2019 weekly chart performance for Born in the U.S.A.
Chart (2019)	Peak position
Greek Albums (IFPI)	4

2023 weekly chart performance for Born in the U.S.A.
Chart (2023)	Peak position
Portuguese Albums (AFP)	22

2024 weekly chart performance for Born in the U.S.A.
Chart (2024)	Peak position
Croatian International Albums (HDU)	12

2025 weekly chart performance for Born in the U.S.A.
Chart (2025–2026)	Peak position
Norwegian Rock Albums (IFPI Norge)	5
US Top Rock & Alternative Albums (Billboard)	16

=== Year-end charts ===
Year-end chart performance for Born in the U.S.A.
Chart (1984)	Position
Australian Albums Chart	7
Canadian Albums Chart	1
Dutch Albums Chart	61
German Albums (Offizielle Top 100)	39
Japanese Albums Chart (Oricon)	53
New Zealand Albums (RMNZ)	2
UK Albums Chart	37
US Billboard Top 200 Albums	28

Chart (1985)	Position
Australian Albums Chart	2
Austrian Albums Chart	3
Canadian Albums Chart	7
Danish Albums Chart	5
Dutch Albums Chart	1
French Albums Chart	19
German Albums (Offizielle Top 100)	1
New Zealand Albums (RMNZ)	1
Swiss Albums Chart	4
UK Albums Chart	4
US Billboard Top Pop Albums	1

Chart (1986)	Position
Canadian Albums Chart	67
Spanish Albums Chart	11
US Billboard 200	16

Chart (2015)	Position
Swedish Albums (Sverigetopplistan)	94

Chart (2016)	Position
Swedish Albums (Sverigetopplistan)	75

Chart (2017)	Position
Swedish Albums (Sverigetopplistan)	96

Chart (2018)	Position
Swedish Albums (Sverigetopplistan)	98

Chart (2019)	Position
Swedish Albums (Sverigetopplistan)	82

Chart (2020)	Position
Swedish Albums (Sverigetopplistan)	63

Chart (2021)	Position
Belgian Albums (Ultratop Flanders)	157
Swedish Albums (Sverigetopplistan)	68

Chart (2022)	Position
Belgian Albums (Ultratop Flanders)	156
Swedish Albums (Sverigetopplistan)	92

Chart (2023)	Position
Belgian Albums (Ultratop Flanders)	142
Dutch Albums (Album Top 100)	72
Swedish Albums (Sverigetopplistan)	54

Chart (2024)	Position
Belgian Albums (Ultratop Flanders)	108
Dutch Albums (Album Top 100)	36
Swedish Albums (Sverigetopplistan)	26

Chart (2025)	Position
Belgian Albums (Ultratop Flanders)	144
Dutch Albums (Album Top 100)	53
Swedish Albums (Sverigetopplistan)	44

== Certifications and sales ==
Sales certifications for Born in the U.S.A.
Region	Certification	Certified units/sales
Australia (ARIA)	14× Platinum	980,000^{‡}
Belgium (BRMA)	Platinum	75,000
Brazil	—	100,000
Canada (Music Canada)	Diamond	1,000,000^{^}
Denmark (IFPI Danmark)	4× Platinum	80,000^{‡}
Finland (Musiikkituottajat)	2× Platinum	108,913
France (SNEP)	Platinum	300,000^{*}
Germany (BVMI)	2× Platinum	1,000,000^{^}
Italy (FIMI) sales since 2009	2× Platinum	100,000^{‡}
Italy	—	1,000,000
Japan (Oricon Charts)	—	212,700
Mexico (AMPROFON)	Platinum	250,000^{‡}
New Zealand (RMNZ)	17× Platinum	255,000^{‡}
Portugal (AFP)	Gold	20,000^{^}
South Africa	—	100,000
Spain (Promusicae)	Gold	50,000^{^}
Switzerland (IFPI Switzerland)	3× Platinum	150,000^{^}
United Kingdom (BPI)	3× Platinum	1,120,000
United States (RIAA)	17× Platinum	17,000,000^{‡}
Summaries
Worldwide	—	30,000,000
^{*} Sales figures based on certification alone.^{^} Shipments figures based on certification alone.^{‡} Sales+streaming figures based on certification alone.
