= Glory Days (Bruce Springsteen song) =

Single by Bruce Springsteen

from the album Born in the U.S.A.
- B-side: "Stand on It"
- Released: May 1985
- Recorded: May 5, 1982
- Studio: Power Station, New York City
- Genre: Rock; heartland rock
- Length: 4:15 (album version); 5:31 (alternate mix); 3:49 (single version)
- Label: Columbia
- Songwriter: Bruce Springsteen
- Producers: Jon Landau; Chuck Plotkin; Bruce Springsteen; Steven Van Zandt

Bruce Springsteen singles chronology
"I'm on Fire" (1985)	"Glory Days" (1985)	"I'm Goin' Down" (1985)

Music video
- "Glory Days" on YouTube

"Glory Days" is a song written and performed by American rock singer Bruce Springsteen. In 1985, it became the fifth single released from his 1984 album Born in the U.S.A.

The single peaked at #9 on the Cashbox Top 100 and #5 on the Billboard Hot 100 in the summer of 1985. It was the fifth of a record-tying seven Top 10 hit singles to be released from Born in the U.S.A.

== History ==
The song is a seriocomic tale of a man who now ruefully looks back on his so-called "glory days" and those of people he knew during high school. The lyrics to the first verse are autobiographical, recounting an encounter Springsteen had with former Little League baseball teammate Joe DePugh in the summer of 1973. On April 2, 2025, Springsteen announced the passing of DePugh. “Just a moment to mark the passing of Freehold native and ballplayer Joe DePugh, He was a good friend when I needed one. ‘He could throw that speedball by you, make you look like a fool’….Glory Days my friend” Springsteen said in a statement on his website and on his social media accounts.

The music is jocular, consisting of what Springsteen biographer Dave Marsh called "rinky-dink organ, honky-tonk piano, and garage-band guitar kicked along by an explosive tom-tom pattern".

=== Missing verse ===
An alternate mix of the song includes an extra verse about the narrator's father, who worked at the Ford auto plant in Metuchen, New Jersey, for twenty years and who now spends most of his time at the American Legion Hall, thinking about how he "ain't never had glory days." However, after Springsteen realized that this verse did not fit with the song's storyline, it was cut out.

== Reception ==
Cash Box described the single as "rowdy, raucous and set for good AOR and CHR airplay...with something for everybody and for all markets."

== Music video ==
The music video for the song was shot in late May 1985 in various locations in New Jersey, and was directed by filmmaker John Sayles, the third video he had done for the album. It featured a narrative story of Springsteen, playing the protagonist in the song, talking to his young son and pitching to a wooden backstop against an imaginary lineup (he eventually lost the game to Graig Nettles). The baseball field scene was shot at Miller Park Stadium in West New York, New Jersey. The field is inside a city block surrounded mostly by homes. Intercut with these were scenes of Springsteen and the E Street Band lip-synching the song in a bar. The bar performance scenes were filmed at Maxwell's in Hoboken, New Jersey.

Although he had left the band the prior year, Steven Van Zandt was invited back to perform in this video, but the two new members of the band, Nils Lofgren and Patti Scialfa, who had not been on the record at all, were also featured. Springsteen's then-wife Julianne Phillips made a cameo appearance at the baseball field at the end.

The video began airing on MTV in mid-June 1985 and went into heavy rotation. The music video received two MTV Video Music Awards nominations, Best Male Video and Best Overall Performance at the 1986 MTV Video Music Awards.

Clips of New York Mets pitcher Dwight Gooden striking out a couple of batters in real games appear in the video.

== Personnel ==
According to the album's liner notes, and authors Philippe Margotin and Jean-Michel Guesdon:

- Bruce Springsteen – vocals, guitars

E Street Band

- Steven Van Zandt – harmony and backing vocals, response vocals, guitars, mandolin
- Roy Bittan – piano
- Clarence Clemons – tambourine
- Danny Federici – organ
- Garry Tallent – bass
- Max Weinberg – drums

== Track listing ==
1. "Glory Days" – 4:15
2. "Stand On It" – 2:30

The B-side of the single, "Stand On It", was a rocker occasionally brought out for encores at concerts. It was a late 1980s hit for country singer Mel McDaniel, and was also featured in the 1986 film Ruthless People and its accompanying soundtrack album.

== Charts ==
=== Weekly charts ===
Weekly chart performance for "Glory Days"
Chart (1985–1986)	Peak position
Australia (Kent Music Report)	29
Austria (Ö3 Austria Top 40)	25
Belgium (Ultratop 50 Flanders)	15
Canada Top Singles (RPM)	17
Europe (Eurochart Hot 100)	18
Ireland (IRMA)	3
Italy (Musica e Dischi)	18
Netherlands (Dutch Top 40)	17
Netherlands (Single Top 100)	16
New Zealand (Recorded Music NZ)	34
Quebec (ADISQ)	36
South Africa (Springbok)	24
Sweden (Sverigetopplistan)	20
Switzerland (Schweizer Hitparade)	19
UK Singles (Official Charts)	17
US Billboard Hot 100	5
US Mainstream Rock Airplay (Billboard)	3
US Cash Box Top 100	9
West Germany (GfK)	27

=== Year-end charts ===
Year-end chart performance for "Glory Days"
Chart (1985)	Rank
US Billboard Hot 100	67
US Cash Box	63

== Certifications ==
Certifications and sales for "Glory Days"
Region	Certification	Certified units/sales
Australia (ARIA)	2× Platinum	140,000^{‡}
New Zealand (RMNZ)	2× Platinum	60,000^{‡}
United Kingdom (BPI)	Silver	200,000^{‡}
United States (RIAA)	Platinum	1,000,000^{‡}
^{‡} Sales+streaming figures based on certification alone.

== In Popular Culture ==
During their 2026 season, the Milwaukee Brewers used Glory Days as their theme song. After every home victory the song would be played throughout the stadium. The song was used heavily in Milwaukee media during their 2026 World Series run, including manager Pat Murphy referencing the song in an interview.
