= Cover Me (Bruce Springsteen song) =

Single by Bruce Springsteen

from the album Born in the U.S.A.
- B-side: "Jersey Girl" (live)
- Released: July 31, 1984
- Recorded: May 12, 1982
- Studio: Power Station, New York City
- Genre: Rock
- Length: 3:26
- Label: Columbia
- Songwriter: Bruce Springsteen
- Producers: Jon Landau; Chuck Plotkin; Bruce Springsteen; Steven Van Zandt

Bruce Springsteen singles chronology
"Dancing in the Dark" (1984)	"Cover Me" (1984)	"Born in the U.S.A." (1984)

Audio
- "Cover Me" on YouTube

"Cover Me" is a song written and performed by American rock singer Bruce Springsteen. It was the second single released from his 1984 album Born in the U.S.A. Springsteen wrote the song for Donna Summer. However, his manager, Jon Landau, decided the song had hit potential, and so he kept it for the upcoming Springsteen album. It has been certified Gold in the US.

== Background and recording ==
The song was first recorded on January 25, 1982 at the Hit Factory in New York City, as a demo version with the E Street Band, during sessions where Springsteen was doing recording for Gary U.S. Bonds' On the Line. Jon Landau's friend David Geffen had asked whether Springsteen could compose a song for Donna Summer (newly signed to Geffen Records), and Springsteen had written "Cover Me". However, Landau felt Springsteen's composition was too good to give away. Although Springsteen did not have a high opinion of the song at the time, he agreed to write and record another demo for Summer, resulting in "Protection". The singer re-recorded "Cover Me" on May 12 at the Power Station, also in New York City, for the version that would later appear on Born in the U.S.A.; he did nine takes. In the couple of years leading up to Born in the U.S.A.'s release, Springsteen recorded about 70 songs as the pool of tracks considered for the album.

== Release ==
The song peaked at No. 10 on the Cashbox Top 100 and No. 7 on the Billboard Hot 100 singles chart in October 1984. It was the second of a record-tying seven Top 10 hit singles to be released from a single album. No music video was made for the song making this and "I'm Goin' Down" as the only singles from the album not to have music videos.

Cash Box called the song "a driving, emotional display of classic Boss."

== Remixes ==
Continuing the club play goal started with "Dancing in the Dark", Arthur Baker created the 12-inch "Undercover Mix" of "Cover Me". This was a large-scale transformation: a new bass line was cut, an unused backing vocal by industry legend Jocelyn Brown was restored, and reggae and dub elements were introduced. It was released on October 15, 1984.

As with the previous effort, the result displeased some of Springsteen's more strait-laced fans, but did gain actual club play: the remix went to number 11 on Billboard's Hot Dance/Disco chart.

== Track listings ==
=== 7-inch single ===
1. "Cover Me" – 3:26
2. "Jersey Girl" – 6:15 with an edited spoken introduction, or at 6:10 without a spoken introduction.

The B-side of the single, "Jersey Girl", was a live performance of a Tom Waits song, recorded on July 9, 1981, at Meadowlands Arena. Springsteen had introduced the song earlier in that special River Tour homecoming stand that opened the arena, slightly rewriting it to replace a Waits line about "whores on Eighth Avenue" and adding a verse that included "that little brat of yours and drop[ping] her off at your mom's." This same recording would later be released as the closing track of Live 1975-85.

Differing pressings of the single had different lengths of "Jersey Girl", sometimes dropping most of a spoken introduction of 0:31 seconds in length. The UK 12-inch single contains the full-length version with the complete spoken introduction at 6:36. Both the sleeve and label erroneously state a playing time of 5:50.

=== 12-inch single ===
1. "Cover Me" (Undercover Mix) – 6:09
2. "Cover Me" (Dub 1) – 4:02
3. "Cover Me" (Radio Mix) – 3:46
4. "Cover Me" (Dub 2) – 4:15

=== CD single (1988) ===
1. "Cover Me" – 3:26
2. "Pink Cadillac" – 3:33

== Live performance history ==
Springsteen was unsure of how to play "Cover Me" in concert, and initially it appeared irregularly in the 1984–1985 Born in the U.S.A. Tour. Then, inspired by Arthur Baker's remix, he rearranged it to open and close with a quiet, ominous, extended, echoing segment as new E Street backup singer Patti Scialfa wailed a snippet of Martha & the Vandellas' "Nowhere to Run" (in her one spotlight role of the show) while her future husband reverbed "Cuh ... vuh ... me-ee-ee", after which the song ramped up into showcase guitar work for Springsteen and Nils Lofgren. "Cover Me" thus became a featured song on the tour, often opening the second set; such a performance was included on the 1986 Live 1975–85. "Cover Me" continued as a regular selection on the 1988 Tunnel of Love Express and Human Rights Now! Tours, and the 1992 leg of the "Other Band" Tour (now without Scialfa's part). After December 1992 it was dropped until Springsteen's first concert in Oslo on July 7, 2008. The song has turned up as a semi-regular on the Working On A Dream Tour, especially after Springsteen and the E Street Band began playing the entire Born in the U.S.A. album in New York and Philadelphia.

For his tours between 2002 and 2023, many of the set lists have been published on his official website, Brucespringsteen.net. Of these, all of the singer's performances of the song are listed in the table below. (Note: This is based on set lists that were captured in archived versions of his website in November 2008 (for the 2002—2008 tours), May 2017 (for the 2009–2017 tours), and February 2024 (for the 2023 tour).)

2002–2017 performances of "Cover Me"
Tour or special performance	Year	Location and date	# of published + performances
The Rising Tour	2002	N/A	0/45 (0%)
The Rising Tour	2003	N/A	0/75 (0%)
Devils & Dust Tour	2005	N/A	0/72 (0%)
Bruce Springsteen with the Seeger Sessions Band Tour	2006	N/A	0/27 (0%)
Magic Tour	2007	N/A	0/40 (0%)
Magic Tour	2008	Oslo – July 7 St. Louis – August 23	2/64 (3.1%)
Working on a Dream Tour	2009	East Rutherford – May 23; Tampere – June 2 Bergen – June 10; Vienna – July 5 Dublin – July 11; Glasgow – July 14; Fort Lauderdale – September 13; Chicago – September 20; East Rutherford – October 3* East Rutherford – October 9* Philadelphia – October 20*	11/85 (12.9%)
Wrecking Ball World Tour	2012	Bergen – July 23; Gothenburg – July 27; East Rutherford – September 22; Rochester – October 31; State College – November 1 Kansas City – November 17; Vancouver – November 26; Oakland – November 30	8/91 (8.8%)
Wrecking Ball World Tour	2013	Sydney – March 20; Oslo – April 30; Stockholm – May 11*; Munich – May 26*; Milan – June 3* Paris – June 29*; London – June 30*; Kilkenny – July 27*; Buenos Aires – September 14; Rio de Janeiro – September 21*	10/47 (21.3%)
High Hopes Tour	2014	Adelaide – February 12; Melbourne – February 15*; Auckland – March 1* Dallas – April 6	4/34 (11.8%)
Saturday Night Live	2015	N/A	0/1 (0%)
The River Tour	2016	Chicago – January 19; Hartford – February 10; Columbus – April 12; Lisbon – May 19; Madrid – May 21; Werchter – July 9	6/72 (8.3%)
The River Tour	2017	Perth – January 27; Melbourne – February 4	2/14 (14.2%)
2023 Tour	2023	N/A	0/66 (0%)
Total			43/667 (5.9%)
*Indicates that Springsteen performed the entire Born in the U.S.A. album at this concert.

== Personnel ==
According to authors Philippe Margotin and Jean-Michel Guesdon:

- Bruce Springsteen – vocals, guitars
- Roy Bittan – piano
- Clarence Clemons – maracas
- Danny Federici – organ
- Garry Tallent – bass
- Max Weinberg – drums
- Richie Rosenberg – backing vocals

== Charts ==
=== Weekly charts ===
Chart (1984)	Peak position
Australia (Kent Music Report)	17
Canada (RPM)	12
Canada (CHUM)	10
Finland (Suomen virallinen lista)	13
France (IFOP)	84
Ireland (IRMA)	6
New Zealand (Recorded Music NZ)	7
Quebec (ADISQ)	28
US Billboard Hot 100	7
US Mainstream Rock (Billboard)	2
US Hot Dance/Disco (Billboard)	11
US Cash Box Top 100	10

Chart (1985)	Peak position
Europe (Eurochart Hot 100)	52
Netherlands (Single Top 100)	30
Sweden (Sverigetopplistan)	15
UK Singles (Official Charts)	16

=== Year-end charts ===
Chart (1984)	Rank
Canada (RPM)	94
US Billboard Hot 100	67
US Cash Box Top 100	80

== Certifications ==
Region	Certification	Certified units/sales
Australia (ARIA)	Gold	35,000^{‡}
United States (RIAA)	Gold	500,000^{^}
^{^} Shipments figures based on certification alone.^{‡} Sales+streaming figures based on certification alone.
