= Pink Cadillac (song) =

Song by Bruce Springsteen

Song by Bruce Springsteen
- A-side: "Dancing in the Dark"
- Released: May 3, 1984
- Recorded: 1983
- Genre: Rock; rock and roll
- Length: 3:33
- Label: Columbia
- Songwriter: Bruce Springsteen
- Producers: Bruce Springsteen; Jon Landau; Chuck Plotkin; Steven Van Zandt

Bruce Springsteen singles chronology
| "Fade Away" (1981) | "Pink Cadillac" (1984) | "Cover Me" (1984) |

"Pink Cadillac" is a song by Bruce Springsteen released as the non-album B-side of "Dancing in the Dark" in 1984. The song received much airplay worldwide and appeared on the Billboard Top Tracks chart for 14 weeks, peaking at No. 27. The song was also a prominent concert number during Springsteen's Born in the U.S.A. Tour.

Bette Midler loved the song and recorded it for her 1983 No Frills album. But after it had been recorded, Springsteen legally stopped the release. "Pink Cadillac" had its highest-profile incarnation via an R&B interpretation by Natalie Cole, which became a top-ten single in 1988.

== Bruce Springsteen version ==
=== Background ===
Springsteen originally wrote "Pink Cadillac" as "Love Is a Dangerous Thing" in December 1981; this version was lyrically distinct from the eventual "Pink Cadillac" except for the line "Eve tempted Adam with an apple", which Springsteen decided to make the basis for a more lighthearted lyric. The first lyrics Springsteen wrote for "Pink Cadillac" were: "They say Eve tempted Adam with an apple but man I ain't going for that/ I know it was her pink Cadillac". The auto imagery was inspired by Elvis Presley's 1954 rendition of "Baby Let's Play House" in which Presley replaced the original lyric: "You may get religion" with: "You may have a pink Cadillac", a reference to the custom painted Cadillac that was then Presley's touring vehicle.

=== Recording ===
First recorded by Springsteen in an acoustic version in early January 1982 in the session whose tracks would comprise the Nebraska album, "Pink Cadillac" was not formally recorded by Springsteen until the sessions for his Born in the U.S.A. album, in the spring of 1983. At the end of one session, when most of the crew had left the studio, Springsteen impulsively cut a basic track of him singing "Pink Cadillac" to his guitar accompaniment; this track was completed with the E Street Band the following morning. Although not included on the completed Born in the U.S.A. album, being bumped from the track list that April in favor of "I'm Goin' Down", "Pink Cadillac" was released in 1984 as the B-side of the album's lead single, "Dancing in the Dark".

The track would appear as one of two songs (along with "Cover Me") on a CD3 released in 1988, but was not included on any Springsteen album until Tracks in 1998, and 18 Tracks in 1999, both these titles being anthologies of Springsteen's outtakes-and-B-sides.

Springsteen's version of "Pink Cadillac" is often compared to the Peter Gunn theme by Henry Mancini, which it resembles in its main riff and saxophone break.

In 2006, Springsteen appeared on a recording of "Pink Cadillac" by Jerry Lee Lewis on his album Last Man Standing.

=== In concert ===
Performing the song live, Springsteen explained the song as being "about the conflict between worldly things and spiritual health, between desires of the flesh and spiritual ecstasy," in a long tongue-in-cheek spoken introduction.

=== Personnel ===
According to authors Philippe Margotin and Jean-Michel Guesdon:

- Bruce Springsteen – vocals, guitar
- Clarence Clemons – saxophone
- Garry Tallent – bass
- Max Weinberg – drums

== Natalie Cole version ==
"Pink Cadillac"

Single by Natalie Cole

from the album Everlasting
- B-side: "I Wanna Be That Woman"
- Released: February 1988
- Genre: Dance-pop
- Length: 4:14 (Radio Mix); 4:28 (Album Version)
- Label: EMI-Manhattan
- Songwriter: Bruce Springsteen
- Producer: Dennis Lambert

Natalie Cole singles chronology
| "I Live for Your Love" (1987) | "Pink Cadillac" (1988) | "When I Fall in Love" (1988) |

In mid-1987, American singer-songwriter and actress Natalie Cole recorded "Pink Cadillac" at the suggestion of producer Dennis Lambert; Cole recalls: "I thought to myself, 'I'm too old to be doing this kind of stuff', but then I'd never worked with anyone quite like Dennis before. He was very passionate about his work [and] his enthusiasm gave me the confidence that I could pull [the song] off." The track was intended for an album release on the Modern label; that project was canceled and Cole's "Pink Cadillac" and another Lambert production: "I Live For Your Love", were picked up by EMI-Manhattan Records to appear on Cole's 1987 album Everlasting.

"Pink Cadillac" was released as that album's third single in March 1988. In May 1988, the song reached number five on both the Billboard Hot 100 and Cashbox Top 100, matching Cole's previous best with "I've Got Love on My Mind" and becoming her first top ten hit since 1978. "Pink Cadillac" also reached number nine on the R&B chart, number 16 on the A/C chart and, via a remix by David Cole (no relation) and Robert Clivilles, number one on Billboard Hot Dance Club Play chart. It became her first top ten hit in the United Kingdom by reaching number five on the UK Singles Chart, her first top forty hit there since 1977.

According to Cole, "word got back" to her that Springsteen "thought it was very cool that a woman could [sing "Pink Cadillac"] and it would come out so great". (Springsteen had vetoed a 1983 release of Bette Midler's version of the song as gender-inappropriate.)

=== Critical reception ===
Tony Reed from Melody Maker wrote, "Natalie struts her sassy stuff across a brass arrangement so punchy it runs Two Ton Tony Tubbs a close second, it's got a bottom end that should have the Wayne and Debbie clubs quaking, and an aesthetic mistake of a synth solo which, in kindness, we'll overlook. Think The Pointer Sisters circa "Neutron Dance", and you'll be on the right lines; a totally professional record her dad would be proud of, perfect MTV fodder, drive time music."

=== Music video ===
The music video for "Pink Cadillac" was directed by Maurice Phillips.

=== Personnel ===
==== Album version ====
Per the Everlasting album liner notes:

- Natalie Cole - lead vocals, all backing vocals
- Paul Jackson Jr. - guitar
- Claude Gaudette - keyboards
- Neil Stubenhaus - bass
- Mike Baird - drums

=== Charts ===
==== Weekly charts ====
Weekly chart performance for "Pink Cadillac"
| Chart (1988) | Peak position |
|---|---|
| Australia (ARIA) | 6 |
| Austria (Ö3 Austria Top 40) | 11 |
| Belgium (Ultratop 50 Flanders) | 16 |
| Canada Top Singles (RPM) | 4 |
| Canada Adult Contemporary (RPM) | 1 |
| Denmark (IFPI) | 7 |
| Europe (Eurochart Hot 100) | 15 |
| Finland (Suomen virallinen lista) | 9 |
| Ireland (IRMA) | 4 |
| Netherlands (Dutch Top 40) | 25 |
| Netherlands (Single Top 100) | 26 |
| New Zealand (Recorded Music NZ) | 4 |
| Switzerland (Schweizer Hitparade) | 2 |
| UK Singles (Official Charts) | 5 |
| US Billboard Hot 100 | 5 |
| US Adult Contemporary (Billboard) | 16 |
| US Dance Club Songs (Billboard) | 1 |
| US Dance Singles Sales (Billboard) | 5 |
| US Hot R&B/Hip-Hop Songs (Billboard) | 9 |
| US Cash Box Top 100 | 5 |
| West Germany (GfK) | 5 |

==== Year-end charts ====
Year-end chart performance for "Pink Cadillac"
| Chart (1988) | Position |
|---|---|
| Australia (ARIA) | 42 |
| Canada Top Singles (RPM) | 34 |
| Europe (Eurochart Hot 100) | 66 |
| New Zealand (RIANZ) | 18 |
| Switzerland (Schweizer Hitparade) | 13 |
| UK Singles (OCC) | 65 |
| US Billboard Hot 100 | 75 |
| US Hot Black Singles (Billboard) | 94 |
| US Dance Club Play (Billboard) | 5 |
| US Cash Box Top 100 | 47 |
| West Germany (Media Control) | 49 |

=== Certifications ===
Certifications and sales for "Pink Cadillac"
| Region | Certification | Certified units/sales |
|---|---|---|
| Canada (Music Canada) | Gold | 50,000^{^} |
^{^} Shipments figures based on certification alone.

== Jerry Lee Lewis version ==
"Pink Cadillac"

Single by Jerry Lee Lewis featuring Bruce Springsteen

from the album Last Man Standing
- Released: 2006
- Recorded: 2005
- Genre: Rock and roll; country rock; blues rock
- Length: 3:59
- Label: Shangri-La Records
- Songwriter: Bruce Springsteen

Jerry Lee Lewis featuring Bruce Springsteen singles chronology
| "Honky Tonk Women" (2006) | "Pink Cadillac" (2006) |

Jerry Lee Lewis covered the song on his 2006 album Last Man Standing with additional vocals by Springsteen himself. The single was released in 2006 on country music stations in the United States. The animated music video premiered on CMT in November 2006.

== Other versions ==
Singer Bette Midler added "Pink Cadillac" to the setlist for her 1982-83 De Tour tour and recorded the song for inclusion on her 1983 No Frills album; however, Springsteen blocked the release of Midler's version on the grounds that "Pink Cadillac" was not a "girl's song". According to the Midler biography Still Divine by Mark Bego, Midler was severely disappointed by Springsteen's veto, which forced her to record a new track ("Beast of Burden") for No Frills at considerable expense. Midler's August 1984 video release Art or Bust video - comprising footage from the two De Tour concerts at the University of Minnesota - included "Pink Cadillac" as the opening number.

Singer Aretha Franklin is sometimes mis-credited as a singer of "Pink Cadillac" as the imagery occurs in her 1985 comeback hit "Freeway of Love" with the same metaphoric sense as in the Springsteen original, the lyric being: "We're going riding on the freeway of love in my pink Cadillac".

Fictional girl group The Chipettes covered Natalie Cole's version for their 1988 album The Chipmunks and The Chipettes: Born to Rock.

"Pink Cadillac" has long been a staple of Melissa Etheridge's live repertoire; at a 2 October 1996 Milwaukee concert by Etheridge, Springsteen joined her onstage to close the show with a duet of "Pink Cadillac". Etheridge has never recorded "Pink Cadillac", although her live performance is widely available as a bootleg recording.

Singer Carl Perkins recorded a version of "Pink Cadillac" on his 1992 album Friends, Family & Legends.

Country rock band Southern Pacific released a version on their 1986 album, Killbilly Hill.

Singer Brian Conley recorded "Pink Cadillac" for his 1993 Brian Conley Sings album.

The 2003 album Light of Day: A Tribute to Bruce Springsteen includes a rendition of "Pink Cadillac" by Graham Parker.

It appeared on the 2004 album Live in Asbury Park, Vol. 2 by Clarence Clemons and Temple of Soul.

Dutch rock band WC Experience wrote an homage to the Opel Kaddett to the tune of this song

Country singer Bobby Mackey released it as a single in 2011.

Gaustad released a cover on in February of 2022.
