= Working on the Highway =

Song by Bruce Springsteen

from the album Born in the U.S.A.
- Released: June 4, 1984
- Recorded: May 6, 1982
- Studio: Power Station, New York City
- Genre: Rockabilly
- Length: 3:11
- Label: Columbia
- Songwriter(s): Bruce Springsteen
- Producer(s): Jon Landau; Chuck Plotkin; Bruce Springsteen; Steve Van Zandt

"Working on the Highway" is a 1984 song written and performed by Bruce Springsteen. It was released on the album Born in the U.S.A. and has remained a popular concert song for Springsteen and the E Street Band.

As with some of the other songs on the Born in the U.S.A. album, including "Downbound Train" and the title track, "Working on the Highway" was originally recorded on January 3, 1982, with the demo tracks that eventually became the Nebraska album. The acoustic version of the song had a working title of "Child Bride", and did not include the rock melody or the title refrain. The version of the song that was released on the album was recorded on May 6, 1982, at the Power Station, at the end of the "Electric Nebraska" sessions.

Although "Working on the Highway" was not one of the seven Born in the U.S.A. songs to be released as a single, it remained popular in concert, with 367 performances through 2016. It is nearly always paired with "Darlington County" in performance.

At a July 26, 1992 performance of the song, Springsteen's mother danced with her son towards the end of the song, prompting Springsteen to say "A boy's best friend is his mother," referencing a line from the Alfred Hitchcock film Psycho.

== Personnel ==
According to authors Philippe Margotin and Jean-Michel Guesdon, and the album's liner notes:

- Bruce Springsteen – vocals, guitars, handclaps

E Street Band

- Steven Van Zandt – acoustic guitar, handclaps
- Danny Federici – organ, handclaps
- Garry Tallent – bass, handclaps
- Max Weinberg – drums, handclaps
