= Downbound Train =

Song by Bruce Springsteen

from the album Born in the U.S.A.
- Released: June 4, 1984
- Recorded: May 6, 1982
- Studio: Power Station, New York City
- Genre: Heartland rock
- Length: 3:35
- Label: Columbia
- Songwriter: Bruce Springsteen
- Producers: Jon Landau; Chuck Plotkin; Bruce Springsteen; Steve Van Zandt

"Downbound Train" is a song that appears on the 1984 Bruce Springsteen album Born in the U.S.A. The song is a lament to a lost spouse, and takes on a melancholy tone. Author Christopher Sandford described the song as beginning "like a Keith Richards' riff" that ultimately moves to "one of those great country busted-heart lines, 'Now I work down at the car wash/where all it ever does is rain.'"

The song was recorded on May 6, 1982 at the Power Station at the end of the "Electric Nebraska" sessions. Like several other Born in the U.S.A. songs, including "Working on the Highway" and the title track, a solo acoustic version of "Downbound Train" was originally recorded on the demo that eventually became the Nebraska album. "Downbound Train" is one of the few tracks that was successfully recorded at the "Electric Nebraska" sessions.

Though it was not one of the seven singles released from the album, the song nevertheless gained some album-oriented rock radio airplay and was featured fairly regularly on the Born in the U.S.A. Tour. It has been performed sporadically in tours since. Overall, the song has been played in concert about 130 times through 2008.

== Reception ==
Author Robert Kirkpatrick contended that "Downbound Train" "might be the best song on the album", and Debby Bull called it "the saddest song [Springsteen]'s ever written." Springsteen biographer Dave Marsh, writing in Glory Days, did not agree, calling "Downbound Train" "the weakest song [Springsteen]'s released since the second album, ... incredibly sloppy ... The protagonist's three jobs in five verses are only symptomatic of its problems." Other observers analyzed it in retrospect as a harbinger, with naturalistic imagery lacing the song throughout in an approach that Springsteen would return to heavily in his Dylan-"Series of Dreams"-influenced early 1990s.

== Personnel ==
According to authors Philippe Margotin and Jean-Michel Guesdon and the album's liner notes:

- Bruce Springsteen – vocals, guitars
- Roy Bittan – synthesizer
- Garry Tallent – bass
- Max Weinberg – drums

== Cover versions ==
- The Smithereens contributed a cover of "Downbound Train" to the 1997 album, One Step Up / Two Steps Back – The Songs of Bruce Springsteen.
- Kurt Vile included a cover of "Downbound Train" on his EP, So Outta Reach.
- Badlands: A Tribute to Bruce Springsteen's Nebraska included a cover of "Downbound Train" by Raul Malo.

== See also ==
- List of train songs
