= I'm on Fire =

1985 single by Bruce Springsteen

Single by Bruce Springsteen

from the album Born in the U.S.A.
- B-side: "Johnny Bye Bye"
- Released: 1985
- Recorded: 1982
- Studio: Power Station, New York City
- Genre: Soft rock; rockabilly; country
- Length: 2:37
- Label: Columbia
- Songwriter: Bruce Springsteen
- Producers: Jon Landau; Chuck Plotkin; Bruce Springsteen; Steven Van Zandt

Bruce Springsteen singles chronology
"Born in the U.S.A." (1984)	"I'm on Fire" (1985)	"Glory Days" (1985)

Music video
- "I'm on Fire" on YouTube

"I'm on Fire" is a song written and performed by American singer Bruce Springsteen. Released in 1985, it was the fourth single from his seventh studio album Born in the U.S.A. (1984).

== History ==
"I'm on Fire" was first recorded in January 1982 during the first wave of Born in the U.S.A. sessions, but the album version and the single were cut on May 11, 1982, at The Power Station. This took place in impromptu fashion when Springsteen started making up a slow tune on guitar for some lyrics he had, some of which had been written for "Spanish Eyes", which would later surface on The Promise, and drummer Max Weinberg and keyboardist Roy Bittan, hearing it for the first time, created an accompaniment on the spot. The result was a moody number that merges a soft rockabilly beat, lyrics built around sexual tension, and synthesizers into an effective whole; it was one of the first uses of that instrument in Springsteen's music.

Cash Box said that the song is "at once a quiet and tense tune of pent up desire."

The song peaked at No. 8 on the Cash Box Top 100 and No. 6 on the Billboard Hot 100 chart in early 1985. It was the fourth of a record-tying seven Top 10 hit singles to be released from Born in the U.S.A. The single also reached No. 1 in the Netherlands for three weeks in July and August 1985, while two other Springsteen singles ("Dancing in the Dark" and "Born in the U.S.A.") were also in the top ten. This marked the first time an artist had as many as three singles inside the Dutch top ten since the Beatles did so in 1965.

== Music video ==
The music video for the song was shot in March 1985 in Los Angeles, and was directed by filmmaker John Sayles. Unlike the previous videos from the album, the video was not a performance clip, but rather a dramatic interpretation of the song's themes.

In it, Springsteen plays a working class automobile mechanic with an attractive, married, very well-to-do, mostly unseen female customer who brings her vintage Ford Thunderbird in for frequent servicing, always requesting that he does the work. She leaves a small bunch of keys with him when she leaves in her car, possibly including house keys implying that she wishes to start an affair with him, but declines his offer to bring the car out to her house when it is ready. Later that night, he drives the car up to her mansion high in the hills above the city. He looks to a second floor window with the light on and is about to ring the bell, when he thinks better of it and drops her keys in the mailbox next to the door. He smiles wistfully and walks away down towards the city lights below.

The video began airing in mid-April, received extensive MTV airplay, and later in the year won the MTV Video Music Award for Best Male Video.

== Track listing ==
1. "I'm on Fire" – 2:36
2. "Johnny Bye Bye" (Springsteen, Chuck Berry) – 1:50

== Personnel ==
According to authors Philippe Margotin and Jean-Michel Guesdon, and the album's liner notes:

- Bruce Springsteen – vocals, guitar
- Roy Bittan – synthesizer
- Max Weinberg – drums

== Charts ==
=== Weekly charts ===
Weekly chart performance for "I'm on Fire"
Chart (1985–1986)	Peak position
Australia (Kent Music Report)	12
Austria (Ö3 Austria Top 40)	10
Belgium (Ultratop 50 Flanders)	1
Canada Top Singles (RPM)	12
Canada Adult Contemporary (RPM)	18
Europe (European Hot 100 Singles) with "Born in the U.S.A."	5
Finland (Suomen virallinen lista)	9
Ireland (IRMA) with "Born in the U.S.A."	1
Italy (Musica e Dischi)	13
Netherlands (Dutch Top 40)	1
Netherlands (Single Top 100)	1
New Zealand (Recorded Music NZ)	10
Sweden (Sverigetopplistan)	20
Switzerland (Schweizer Hitparade)	15
UK Singles (Official Charts) with "Born in the U.S.A."	5
US Billboard Hot 100	6
US Adult Contemporary (Billboard)	6
US Cash Box Hot 100	8
West Germany (GfK)	16

=== Year-end charts ===
Year-end chart performance for "I'm on Fire"
Chart (1985)	Position
Australia (Kent Music Report)	86
Belgium (Ultratop)	25
Canada Top Singles (RPM)	90
Netherlands (Dutch Top 40)	13
Netherlands (Single Top 100)	9
US Billboard Hot 100	82
US Adult Contemporary (Billboard)	42
West Germany (Media Control)	60

== Certifications ==
Certifications for "I'm on Fire"
Region	Certification	Certified units/sales
Denmark (IFPI Danmark)	Platinum	90,000^{‡}
Germany (BVMI)	Gold	250,000^{‡}
Italy (FIMI)	Platinum	100,000^{‡}
New Zealand (RMNZ)	5× Platinum	150,000^{‡}
Spain (Promusicae)	Gold	30,000^{‡}
United Kingdom (BPI)	2× Platinum	1,200,000^{‡}
United States (RIAA)	2× Platinum	2,000,000^{‡}
^{‡} Sales+streaming figures based on certification alone.
