= Darlington County (song) =

Song by Bruce Springsteen

from the album Born in the U.S.A.
- Released: June 4, 1984
- Recorded: May 13, 1982
- Studio: Power Station, New York City
- Genre: Rock
- Length: 4:48
- Label: Columbia
- Songwriter: Bruce Springsteen
- Producers: Jon Landau; Chuck Plotkin; Bruce Springsteen; Steve Van Zandt

"Darlington County" is a 1984 song written and performed by Bruce Springsteen. It was released on the album Born in the U.S.A. and has remained a popular concert song for Springsteen and the E Street Band.

== Lyrics ==
The lyrics concern the protagonist and his buddy driving to Darlington County "looking for work on the county line", meeting girls along the way. In the song the protagonist tells girls that their fathers each own one of the "World Trade Centers". The actual Darlington County is in South Carolina.

== Background ==
Springsteen wrote "Darlington County" during the sessions for Darkness on the Edge of Town (1978). The version of the song that was released on Born in the U.S.A. was recorded on May 13, 1982, at the Power Station in one of the early recording sessions.

== Cover versions ==
Jeff Stevens and the Bullets took a cover version to No. 69 on the Hot Country Songs charts in 1987.

== Live performance history ==
"Darlington County" was played during every leg of the Born in the U.S.A. Tour. The song did not emerge again until four days after the breakup with the Other Band. During the 1999 Reunion Tour, the song was performed frequently. It has remained popular in concert, and is often paired with "Working on the Highway" in performance. When performing the song live, Springsteen frequently plays the first few bars of the Rolling Stones' "Honky Tonk Women" before the first verse.

== Personnel ==
According to authors Philippe Margotin and Jean-Michel Guesdon:

- Bruce Springsteen – vocals, guitars
- Steven Van Zandt – guitars, harmony vocals
- Roy Bittan – piano, backing vocals
- Clarence Clemons – saxophone, cowbell, maracas, backing vocals
- Danny Federici – organ
- Garry Tallent – bass, backing vocals
- Max Weinberg – drums, backing vocals
