= Chuck Plotkin =

American recording engineer and producer

- Born: Charles Richard Plotkin; September 8, 1942 (age 83); Los Angeles, California, U.S.
- Occupations: Record producer, film producer, audio engineer, mixing engineer
- Employer(s): Chuck Plotkin Productions, Inc., Clover Recorders

Charles Richard Plotkin (born September 8, 1942) is an American record producer, film producer audio engineer and mixing engineer, best known for his work with Bruce Springsteen and Bob Dylan.

== Recording engineer ==
Plotkin has recorded, engineered, mastered and produced albums by Bruce Springsteen, Bob Dylan and many other artists, starting with the Floating House Band in 1972. Just before hooking up with Springsteen for the mixing of Darkness on the Edge of Town, Plotkin produced the Cocaine Drain album by the Cowsills.

Among Plotkin's major achievements as an engineer was the mastering of Bruce Springsteen's Nebraska album. Springsteen recorded the album as a set of demonstration tapes on an inexpensive home cassette recorder. The task of turning the raw, unprocessed cassette tape (which had spent weeks in Springsteen's pants pocket) into a professional-sounding vinyl LP was a daunting one, and a major technical accomplishment.

He has been credited as a producer on several Springsteen albums.

== Film and record producer ==
Plotkin was credited as producer for the 1995 movie Mirage, and produced the soundtrack albums for several films including Dead Man Walking, Vietnam, Long Time Coming, Philadelphia, and Jerry Maguire.

== Other appearances ==
Plotkin was also featured in the 1996 documentary Blood Brothers: Bruce Springsteen and the E Street Band, which documented an E Street Band recording session the preceding year.
