= LA Sports Arena, California 1988 =

Live album by Bruce Springsteen & the E Street Band and The Horns of Love
- Released: July 8, 2015
- Recorded: April 23, 1988
- Genre: Rock
- Length: 3:20:31
- Label: http://live.brucespringsteen.net
- Producer: Toby Scott, Paul du Gré

Bruce Springsteen & the E Street Band and The Horns of Love chronology
Brendan Byrne Arena, New Jersey 1984 (2015)	LA Sports Arena, California 1988 (2015)	Schottenstein Center, Ohio 2005 (2015)

LA Sports Arena, California 1988 is a live album by Bruce Springsteen & The E Street Band with The Horns of Love, released in July 2015 and the sixth official release through the Bruce Springsteen Archives. The show was originally recorded live at the Los Angeles Sports Arena in Los Angeles, California on April 23, 1988 during the Tunnel of Love Express.

The concert is available on CD and digital download at http://live.brucespringsteen.net.

== Background ==
This is the first complete recording to be officially released from the tour, which was the first to feature a full horn section for the length of the tour. This was provided by The Miami Horns who were renamed The Horns of Love for the outing. This tour marked the last time Springsteen would go out with the E Street Band until their reunion tour in 1999.

== Track listing ==
All songs by Bruce Springsteen, except as noted.

=== Set One ===
1. "Tunnel of Love" – 7:59
2. "Be True" – 4:52
3. "Adam Raised a Cain" – 5:51
4. "Two Faces" – 4:39
5. "All That Heaven Will Allow" – 11:21
6. "Seeds" – 5:47
7. "Roulette" – 4:22
8. "Cover Me" – 7:31
9. "Brilliant Disguise" – 5:11
10. "Spare Parts" – 10:09
11. "War" – 2:59 (Whitfield/Strong)
  - Originally Recorded by Edwin Starr
12. "Born in the U.S.A." – 8:18

=== Set Two ===
1. "Tougher Than the Rest" – 6:02
2. "Ain't Got You" – 2:33
3. "She's the One" – 6:57
4. "You Can Look (But You Better Not Touch)" – 6:00
5. "I'm a Coward" – 9:42
6. "I'm on Fire" – 4:19
7. "One Step Up" – 5:49
8. "Part Man, Part Monkey" – 4:53
9. "Backstreets" – 7:52
10. "Dancing in the Dark" – 6:22
11. "Light of Day" – 7:36

=== First Encore ===
1. "Happy Birthday to Roy Orbison" – 3:06
2. "Born to Run" – 5:32
3. "Hungry Heart" – 5:00
4. "Glory Days" – 8:58
5. "Rosalita (Come Out Tonight)" – 10:26

=== Second Encore ===
1. "Have Love, Will Travel" – 5:47 (Berry)
  - Originally Recorded by Richard Berry
2. "Tenth Avenue Freeze Out" – 4:34
3. "Sweet Soul Music" (Conley/Redding)
  - Originally Recorded by Arthur Conley
4. "Raise Your Hand" (Cropper/Floyd/Bell)
  - Originally Recorded by Eddie Floyd

== Personnel ==
=== The E Street Band ===
- Bruce Springsteen – lead vocals, guitars, harmonica
- Roy Bittan – piano, synthesizer
- Clarence Clemons – saxophone, congas, percussion, background vocals
- Danny Federici – organ
- Nils Lofgren – guitars, background vocals
- Patti Scialfa – background vocals, some featured duet vocals, acoustic guitar, percussion
- Garry Tallent – bass guitar
- Max Weinberg – drums

=== The Horns of Love ===
- Mario Cruz – saxophone
- Eddie Manion – saxophone
- Mark Pender – trumpet
- Richie "La Bamba" Rosenberg – trombone
- Mike Spengler – trumpet
