= Chimes of Freedom =

Chimes of Freedom may refer to:

- "Chimes of Freedom" (song), a 1964 song written by Bob Dylan
- Chimes of Freedom (EP), a 1988 live Bruce Springsteen EP
- Chimes of Freedom: The Politics of Bob Dylan's Art, a 2003 book about Bob Dylan by Mike Marqusee
- Chimes of Freedom (album), a 2012 album compiling covers of Bob Dylan songs
- Chimes of Freedom (horse)
