= Video Anthology / 1978–88 =

Video by Bruce Springsteen
- Released: 1989/2001
- Recorded: 1978–1988
- Genre: Rock
- Length: 100 minutes
- Label: Columbia
- Director: Various

Bruce Springsteen chronology
Video Anthology / 1978–88 (1989)	In Concert/MTV Plugged (1992)

Bruce Springsteen's Video Anthology / 1978–88 is a collection of 18 music videos made on his behalf, released in VHS format on January 31, 1989. In March 1989, "Video Anthology / 1978–88" was certified 3× Platinum by the Recording Industry Association of America (RIAA) for shipment of 300,000 units. As of March 1989, the collection sold 340,000 copies in the United States.

It was reissued as The Complete Video Anthology / 1978-2000 by Sony in DVD on January 16, 2001, adding a second disc with 15 additional music videos or other clips.

== 1989 release ==
1. Rosalita (Live, from 8 July 1978, Veterans Memorial Coliseum, Phoenix, Arizona; directed by Arnold Levine, from the Darkness Tour; band intros edited out compared to original MTV version)
2. The River (1979; from No Nukes concert film; directed by Danny Goldberg, Julian Schlossberg, Anthony Potenza)
3. Thunder Road (1979; from No Nukes also)
4. Atlantic City (1982; directed by Arnold Levine)
5. Dancing in the Dark (1984; directed by Brian De Palma)
6. Born in the U.S.A. (1984; directed by John Sayles)
7. I'm on Fire (1985; directed by John Sayles)
8. Glory Days (1985; directed by John Sayles)
9. My Hometown (1985; directed by Arthur Rosato; from the Born in the U.S.A. Tour)
10. War (1986; directed by Arthur Rosato; from the Born in the U.S.A. Tour)
11. Fire (1986; acoustic performance from Neil Young's Bridge School Benefit)
12. Born to Run (1987; directed by Arthur Rosato)
13. Brilliant Disguise (1987; directed by Meiert Avis)
14. Tunnel of Love (1987; directed by Meiert Avis)
15. One Step Up (1988; directed by Meiert Avis)
16. Tougher Than the Rest (1987; directed by Meiert Avis)
17. Spare Parts (1988; directed by Carol Dodds)
18. Born to Run (1988; directed by Meiert Avis; acoustic rendition from the Tunnel of Love Express)

== 2001 second disc ==
1. Human Touch (1992; directed by Meiert Avis)
2. Better Days (1992; directed by Meiert Avis)
3. 57 Channels (and Nothin' On) (1992; directed by Adam Bernstein)
4. Leap of Faith (1992; directed by Meiert Avis)
5. Streets of Philadelphia (1993; directed by Jonathan Demme and Ted Demme)
6. Murder Incorporated (1995; directed by Jonathan Demme)
7. Secret Garden (1995; directed by Peter Care)
8. Hungry Heart (previously unreleased; 1995; produced and directed by "the Torpedo Twins" Rudi Dolezal & Hannes Rossacher)
9. Dead Man Walkin' (1996; directed by Tim Robbins)
10. The Ghost of Tom Joad (1996; directed by Arnold Levine, photographed by Pamela Springsteen)
11. The Ghost of Tom Joad (1995; The Tonight Show with Jay Leno performance)
12. Highway Patrolman (previously unreleased; 2000; directed by Sean Penn)
13. If I Should Fall Behind (previously unreleased; 2000; directed by Jonathan Demme; from the Reunion Tour)
14. Born in the U.S.A. (1998; The Charlie Rose Show solo acoustic rendition)
15. Secret Garden (previously unreleased; with strings; alternate version of the song from Blood Brothers documentary)

== Certifications and sales ==
Region	Certification	Certified units/sales
Australia (ARIA)	3× Platinum	45,000^{^}
Spain (Promusicae)	Gold	10,000^{^}
Sweden (GLF)	Gold	10,000^{^}
United States (RIAA)	3× Platinum	300,000^{^}
^{^} Shipments figures based on certification alone.
