= Spare Parts (song) =

1988 single by Bruce Springsteen

Single by Bruce Springsteen

from the album Tunnel of Love
- B-side: "Pink Cadillac"; "Spare Parts" (live); "Chimes of Freedom" (live)
- Released: September 12, 1988
- Recorded: January 22 – May 1, 1987
- Studio: Thrill Hill East
- Genre: Rock, country rock, blues rock
- Length: 3:44
- Label: Columbia
- Songwriter: Bruce Springsteen
- Producers: Jon Landau, Bruce Springsteen, Chuck Plotkin

Bruce Springsteen singles chronology
"Tougher Than the Rest" (1988)	"Spare Parts" (1988)	"Human Touch" (1992)

Music video
- Spare Parts on Youtube.com

"Spare Parts" is a song by the American singer-songwriter Bruce Springsteen from his 1987 Tunnel of Love album. It was released as a single in some countries, following "Brilliant Disguise", the title track and "Tougher Than the Rest", but was not released as a single in the United States.

== History ==
Like much of the Tunnel of Love album, "Spare Parts" was recorded in Springsteen's home studio, called Thrill Hill East, between January and May 1987 with several members of the E Street Band. The song has one of the largest backing bands on the album. On this song, Springsteen played several instruments and is backed by Danny Federici on organ, Max Weinberg on percussion, Garry Tallent on bass and James Wood (a non-E Street Band member) on harmonica.

"Spare Parts" is the most flat-out rock song on Tunnel of Love, but lacks the subtlety and understatement that highlights most of the album, although the theme of love as a lie sets up the middle section of the album. Musically, the song features an engaging, blistering guitar part and propulsive drum sound. The themes of the song include alienation and terror in love, the consequences of evading commitment, and the impossibility of living without commitment. Overall, the song is harrowing, bleak, abrasive and tough-minded.

The bitter, cold lyrics tell of an unwed mother who is abandoned by her boyfriend, who gives her nothing but empty promises. The opening lines are jarring, establishing the mood: "Bobby said he'd pull out/Bobby stayed in/Janey had a baby/It wasn't any sin/They were set to marry on a summer's day/Bobby got scared and ran away." She tries to support the child on her own, and hears of another young mother who committed infanticide. Although she considers doing the same by drowning her son, she ultimately accepts her responsibility and decides against, baptizing the boy instead.

Unlike the other videos of songs from Tunnel of Love, the video for "Spare Parts" was not directed by Meiert Avis. Rather, the video was directed by Carol Dodds.

== Live performance history ==
"Spare Parts" has been one of the most popular of the Tunnel of Love songs in live performances. From the Tunnel of Love Express Tour that supported the initial release of the album through July 2005, the song received 132 live performances in concert.

== Personnel ==
According to authors Philippe Margotin and Jean-Michel Guesdon:

- Bruce Springsteen – vocals, guitars, harmonica, drum machine programming (with Toby Scott)
- Danny Federici – organ
- Garry Tallent – bass
- Max Weinberg – percussion
- James Wood – harmonica

== Charts ==
Weekly chart performance for "Spare Parts"
Chart (1988–1989)	Peak
Australia (ARIA)	58
Europe (Eurochart Hot 100)	88
Ireland (IRMA)	12
Italy (Musica e Dischi)	10
Netherlands (Single Top 100)	78
Sweden (Sverigetopplistan)	16
UK Singles (OCC)	32
