= Tunnel of Love (album) =

1987 studio album by Bruce Springsteen

Studio album by Bruce Springsteen
- Released: October 9, 1987
- Recorded: January–July 1987
- Studios: New Jersey; A&M, Los Angeles; Kren, Hollywood; The Hit Factory, New York City
- Genres: Pop; rock; pop rock
- Length: 46:25
- Label: Columbia
- Producers: Bruce Springsteen; Jon Landau; Chuck Plotkin

Bruce Springsteen chronology
Live/1975–85 (1986)	Tunnel of Love (1987)	Chimes of Freedom (1988)

Bruce Springsteen and the E Street Band chronology
Live/1975–85 (1986)	Tunnel of Love (1987)	Chimes of Freedom (1988)

Singles from Tunnel of Love
- 1. "Brilliant Disguise" Released: September 1987; 2. "Tunnel of Love" Released: November 1987; 3. "One Step Up" Released: February 1988 (US); 4. "Tougher Than the Rest" Released: June 1988 (EU); 5. "Spare Parts" Released: September 1988 (EU)

"Brilliant Disguise"
A 25-second sample of "Brilliant Disguise"

Tunnel of Love is the eighth studio album by the American singer-songwriter Bruce Springsteen, released on October 9, 1987. Although members of the E Street Band occasionally performed on the album, Springsteen recorded most of the parts himself, often with drum machines and synthesizers. Tunnel of Love is not officially regarded as an E Street Band album, as The Rising (2002) was marketed as his first studio album with the E Street Band since Born in the U.S.A. (1984).

In 1989, the album was ranked No. 25 on Rolling Stone magazine's list of the "100 Best Albums of the Eighties" while in 2012, Rolling Stone ranked it at No. 467 on their list of the 500 greatest albums of all time. "Brilliant Disguise", "Tunnel of Love", "One Step Up", "Tougher Than the Rest", and "Spare Parts" were all released as singles. "Tunnel of Love" won Best Rock Vocal Performance, Solo at the 1988 Grammy Awards.

== Background ==
The New York Times writer Jon Pareles said that Springsteen "turned inward" on this album, writing about "love gone wrong" in response to changes in his personal life, particularly his crumbling marriage to Julianne Phillips. Pareles said that most of the songs on the album were about the difficulty of mature love rather than Springsteen's earlier arena rock anthems to the working man. Tunnel of Love songs were described as "midtempo ballads or pop-rock hymns". "Brilliant Disguise" has been called "a heart-wrenching song about never being really able to know someone".

On the B-sides of vinyl and cassette singles, outtakes like "Lucky Man", "Two for the Road" and a 1979 track, "Roulette" were included. On the EP that accompanied the 1988 tour, Springsteen included album cut "Tougher Than the Rest", but included another River outtake, "Be True" a rearranged, acoustic "Born To Run", and a cover of Bob Dylan's "Chimes of Freedom".

Commercially the album went triple Platinum in the US on April 19, 1988, with "Brilliant Disguise" being one of his biggest hit singles, peaking at No. 5 on the Billboard Hot 100, "Tunnel of Love" also making the top 10, reaching No. 9, and "One Step Up" reaching the top 20 at No. 13. The 1988 Springsteen and E Street Band Tunnel of Love Express Tour would showcase the album's songs, sometimes in arrangements courtesy of the Miami Horns.

Amusement park tunnel of love memorabilia was provided by the National Amusement Park Historical Association to be used on the record sleeve of the Tunnel of Love single. A cover of "All That Heaven Will Allow" was a minor hit single for country band the Mavericks in 1995.

== Music videos ==
Irish filmmaker Meiert Avis directed the music videos for "Brilliant Disguise", "One Step Up", "Tougher Than the Rest", and "Tunnel of Love". The videos were shot on location in New Jersey, including Asbury Park. The intensely personal "Brilliant Disguise" video broke new ground on MTV, being a single shot without edits. The video of the title track was nominated for five MTV Video Music Awards, including Video of the Year, and Best Editing.

== Critical reception ==
Professional ratings
Review scores
Source	Rating
AllMusic	5/5 stars
Chicago Tribune	4/4 stars
Encyclopedia of Popular Music	4/5 stars
MusicHound Rock	4/5 stars
Pitchfork	9.5/10
Q	4/5 stars
Rolling Stone	5/5 stars
The Rolling Stone Album Guide	5/5 stars
Tom Hull	A
The Village Voice	A

In a contemporary review for Playboy, music critic Robert Christgau wrote that, apart from the humorous opening track and the clichéd track that follows, Tunnel of Love is "convincing, original stuff—it zeroes in on fear of commitment as a pathology and battles it." He particularly praised the album's introspective second half in his consumer guide for The Village Voice, saying that it showed Springsteen's decency and ability for self-examination. Rolling Stone magazine's Steve Pond said that Tunnel of Love is "a varied, modestly scaled, modern-sounding pop album" rather than a rock and roll album and felt that its unromantic tales of love are similar to Springsteen's socially conscious work about broken promises and dreams in America:

On Tunnel of Love, Springsteen is writing about the promises people make to each other and the way they renege on those promises, about the romantic dreams we're brought up with and the internal demons that stifle those dreams. The battleground has moved from the streets to the sheets, but the battle hasn't changed significantly.

In The Village Voice's annual Pazz & Jop critics poll, Tunnel of Love finished second in the voting for the year's best album. Christgau, the poll's creator, named it the third best album of the year in his own list. In 1989, the album was ranked No. 25 on Rolling Stone magazine's list of the "100 Best Albums of the Eighties" while in 2012, the same magazine ranked it at No. 467 on their list of the 500 greatest albums of all time. In 1998, Q magazine readers voted Tunnel of Love the 91st greatest album of all time.

Writing for America Magazine, Catholic priest and sociologist Andrew Greeley argued that this album exemplifies the American Catholic imagination. In a 2014 article for Grantland, Steven Hyden said Tunnel of Love remained Springsteen's "most underrated record" among fans but in his own opinion, Springsteen's best lyrically. "You really shouldn't be allowed to hear this record until you've been married for a few years", Hyden wrote, "though at that point it might strike a little too close to home. If Ingmar Bergman had been born in Freehold and cut his artistic teeth at the Stone Pony, he would've made this record in place of Scenes From a Marriage. Totally '80s production aside ... this album represents the heaviest blues of Springsteen's career. The songs are about men and women who flirt, have sex, fall in love, get married, get bored, have sex with other people, and wind up stuck in the middle of that dark night from the second disc of The River."

== Track listing ==
All tracks are written by Bruce Springsteen.

Side one
No.	Title	Length
1.	"Ain't Got You"	2:11
2.	"Tougher Than the Rest"	4:35
3.	"All That Heaven Will Allow"	2:39
4.	"Spare Parts"	3:44
5.	"Cautious Man"	3:58
6.	"Walk Like a Man"	3:45

Side two
No.	Title	Length
7.	"Tunnel of Love"	5:12
8.	"Two Faces"	3:03
9.	"Brilliant Disguise"	4:17
10.	"One Step Up"	4:22
11.	"When You're Alone"	3:24
12.	"Valentine's Day"	5:10
Total length:		46:25

=== Unreleased outtakes ===
While more than 80 songs were said to have been recorded for Springsteen's previous album, only 19 are known to have been recorded for Tunnel of Love, with 12 making the album's final cut. "Lucky Man" and "Two For the Road" were released as B-sides, and later on Tracks along with other outtakes such as "The Honeymooners," "The Wish" and "When You Need Me." "Part Man, Part Monkey" was also recorded during these sessions and played live on the Tunnel of Love Express Tour. Although that version remains unreleased, it would be re-recorded during future album sessions and eventually released. "Walking Through Midnight," the only other unreleased song, was co-written by Southside Johnny who recorded the song for his own album, 1988's Slow Dance.

- "Part Man, Part Monkey"
- "Walking Through Midnight"

== Personnel ==
Musicians

- Bruce Springsteen – lead vocals, backing vocals, guitars, mandolin, bass guitar, keyboards, harmonica, percussion, drum machine, sound effects on "Tunnel of Love"
- Roy Bittan – acoustic piano on "Brilliant Disguise" and synthesizers on "Tunnel of Love"
- Clarence Clemons – backing vocals on "When You're Alone"
- Danny Federici – Hammond organ on "Tougher Than the Rest", "Spare Parts", and "Brilliant Disguise"
- Nils Lofgren – guitar solo on "Tunnel of Love" and backing vocals on "When You're Alone"
- Patti Scialfa – backing vocals on "Tunnel of Love", "One Step Up", and "When You're Alone"
- Garry Tallent – bass guitar on "Spare Parts"
- Max Weinberg – drums on "All That Heaven Will Allow", "Two Faces", and "When You're Alone"; percussion on "Tougher Than the Rest", "Spare Parts", "Walk Like a Man", "Tunnel of Love", and "Brilliant Disguise"
- James Wood – harmonica on "Spare Parts"

Technical

- Toby Scott – engineering
- Tim Leitner, Roger Talkov, Squeek Stone, Rob Jacobs – engineering assistants
- Bob Clearmountain – mixing
- Mark McKenna – mixing assistant
- Jay Healy – mixing assistant on "Tunnel of Love"
- Bob Ludwig – mastering
- Heidi Cron – mastering assistant
- Sandra Choron – art direction
- Annie Leibovitz, Bob Adelman, Kryn Taconis, Elliott Erwitt – photography

== Charts ==
=== Weekly charts ===
Weekly chart performance for Tunnel of Love
Chart (1987–88)	Position
Australian Kent Music Report	5
Austrian Albums Chart	6
Canadian RPM Albums Chart	1
Dutch Albums Chart	4
European Albums (Music & Media)	2
French SNEP Albums Chart	5
Italian M&D Albums Chart	1
Japanese Oricon LPs Chart	3
New Zealand Albums Chart	6
Norwegian VG-lista Albums Chart	1
Spanish Albums Chart	1
Swedish Albums Chart	1
Swiss Albums Chart	2
UK Albums Chart	1
U.S. Billboard 200	1
West German Media Control Albums Chart	3
Zimbabwean Albums Chart	2

=== Year-end charts ===
1987 year-end chart performance for Tunnel of Love
Chart (1987)	Position
Australian Albums Chart	63
Canadian Albums Chart	16
Dutch Albums Chart	52
French Albums Chart	35
UK Albums Chart	49

1988 year-end chart performance for Tunnel of Love
Chart (1988)	Position
Dutch Albums Chart	36
Swiss Albums Chart	14
U.S. Billboard Year-End	16

== Certifications and sales ==
Certifications and sales for Tunnel of Love
Region	Certification	Certified units/sales
Australia (ARIA)	2× Platinum	140,000^{^}
Canada (Music Canada)	3× Platinum	300,000^{^}
Finland (Musiikkituottajat)	Gold	40,716
France (SNEP)	2× Gold	200,000^{*}
Germany (BVMI)	Gold	250,000^{^}
Italy	—	400,000
Japan	—	128,400
Netherlands (NVPI)	2× Platinum	200,000^{^}
New Zealand (RMNZ)	Platinum	15,000^{^}
Norway (IFPI Norway)	Platinum	100,000
Portugal (AFP)	Gold	20,000^{^}
Spain (Promusicae)	2× Platinum	200,000^{^}
Sweden (GLF)	Platinum	100,000^{^}
Switzerland (IFPI Switzerland)	Platinum	50,000^{^}
United Kingdom (BPI)	Platinum	300,000^{^}
United States (RIAA)	3× Platinum	3,000,000^{^}
^{*} Sales figures based on certification alone.^{^} Shipments figures based on certification alone.
