= Radrennbahn Weissensee =

Cycling track in Weißensee, Berlin, Germany

Coordinates: 52°33′52″N 13°27′28″E

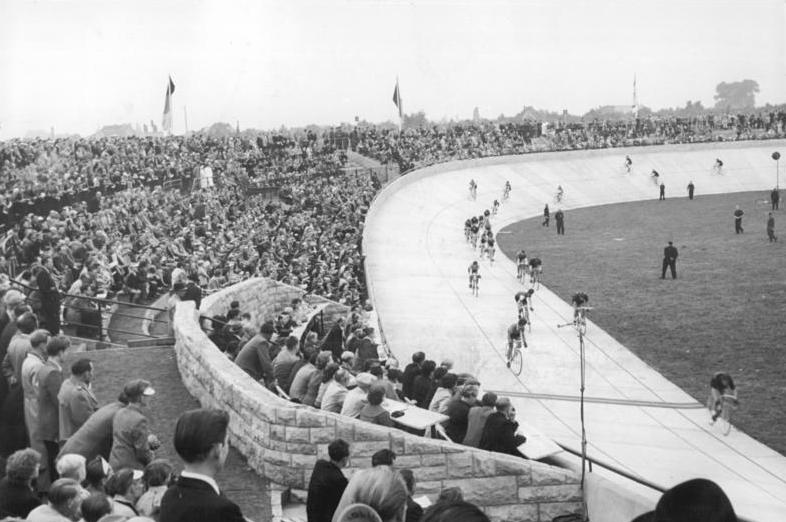
- Inauguration on 25 September 1955
- Interactive map of Radrennbahn Weissensee
- Address: Berlin; Germany
- Location: Weissensee

Construction
- Opened: 25 September 1955

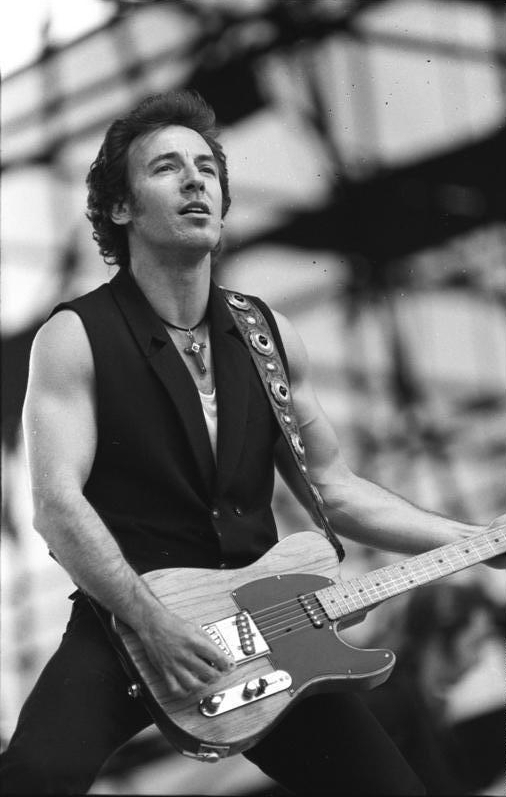
Bruce Springsteen performing on the Tunnel of Love Express Tour at the Radrennbahn Weißensee in East Berlin on July 19, 1988.

Radrennbahn Weissensee is a large cycling track located in the Weissensee district of Berlin. It is north of the park containing the Weisser See. It is also popular for inline skating and skateboarding.

== East German concert venue ==
During the time Radrennbahn Weissensee was part of East Berlin, it was also used as a concert venue. Acts such as James Brown and ZZ Top played there, in an attempt to satisfy the musical desires of East German youth. The most known concert held there, and the biggest concert in East German history, was the July 19, 1988, performance of Bruce Springsteen and the E Street Band on their Tunnel of Love Express tour. It attracted officially 160,000 fans (the actual number is said to be 500,000) and featured Springsteen introducing Bob Dylan's "Chimes of Freedom" by saying in German, "It's great to be in East Berlin. I want to tell you, I'm not here for or against any government. I came here to play rock-and-roll for you East Berliners in the hope that one day all the barriers will be torn down.” It subsequently hosted the Rolling Stones' Urban Jungle Tour in August 1990.
