= One Step Up =

1988 single by Bruce Springsteen

Single by Bruce Springsteen

from the album Tunnel of Love
- B-side: "Roulette"
- Released: February 1988
- Recorded: A May - June 1987; B April 3, 1979
- Studio: A - A&M, Hollywood; B - Power Station, New York City
- Genre: Rock, pop
- Length: A 4:17 / B 3:44
- Label: Columbia
- Songwriter: Bruce Springsteen
- Producers: Jon Landau, Bruce Springsteen, A - Chuck Plotkin, B - Steve Van Zandt

Bruce Springsteen singles chronology
"Tunnel of Love" (1987)	"One Step Up" (1988)	"Tougher Than the Rest" (1988)

Music video
- One Step Up on Youtube.com

"One Step Up" is a song by the American singer-songwriter Bruce Springsteen from his eighth studio album, Tunnel of Love (1987). It was released as the third single from the album, following "Brilliant Disguise" and the title track. It reached position #13 on the Billboard Hot 100 chart, #3 on the Adult Contemporary chart in the United States, and #23 in Canada. It also reached #2 on the U.S. Album Rock Tracks chart, giving Springsteen three straight top two tracks from the album. The song was only released as a single in America. One of the unreleased songs from 1980's The River, "Roulette", recorded April 3, 1979, was released as the b-side, using an alternate vocal mixed on April 12, 1980, that would also be used in 1998, when it was chosen for Tracks.

== History ==
Unlike much of the Tunnel of Love album, "One Step Up" was not recorded in Springsteen's home studio (Thrill Hill East). Rather, it was recorded at A&M Studios in Los Angeles, California, between May and June 1987. Springsteen plays all instruments, and future wife Patti Scialfa provided backing vocals. No other members of Springsteen's usual backing group, the E Street Band, played on the recording.

Like several other songs on the album, the song reflects the impending breakup of the marriage between Springsteen and then-wife Julianne Phillips. The song's lyrics are poetic, understated, emotional and eloquent. The song begins by describing a house with a broken furnace and a car that doesn't start, which serve as metaphors for the couple's relationship. Similar metaphors in the song are a bird that won't sing and church bells that won't ring for a new bride-to-be. Although the couple has been together for some time, they haven't learned from their experiences and continue to fight and slam doors. The lyrics refer to the couple's relationship as their "dirty little war." Finally, the singer finds himself at a bar wondering whether to hook up with another woman there, while remembering a dream he had the night before about dancing with his wife, with the dance poignantly echoing the song's title (one step up and two steps back). The singer is self-aware enough to recognize his share of responsibility for the couple's difficulties, as demonstrated in particular by the line: "When I look at myself I don't see/The man I wanted to be". Music critic Dave Marsh describes the song as being "as miserable a cheating song as even Nashville ever knew."

The music for the song has a bare arrangement, reflecting how personal the song is. It is a quiet ballad with a reassuring melody. The backing vocal provides a haunting echo to Springsteen's lead vocal. Although this is a song about a marriage breaking up, the backing vocals were sung by the woman who eventually became Springsteen's wife, Patti Scialfa.

== Reception ==
Cash Box said that "it's the interplay between the wistful message and [Springsteen's] plaintive music that makes this song, and the album such a wonderfully honest and insightful treatise on the state of the modem heart."

== Music video ==
Like several other videos from the Tunnel of Love album, including "Brilliant Disguise", "Tunnel of Love" and "Tougher Than the Rest", the video for "One Step Up" was directed by Meiert Avis. It was filmed on February 15, 1988, at The Wonder Bar, Asbury Park, NJ. The video intersperses scenes of Springsteen singing the song with images reflecting the song's narrative. The video was later released on the VHS and DVD Video Anthology / 1978-88.

== Live performances ==
Perhaps due to the personal nature of the song, it has rarely been performed live. The song was a staple on the 1988 Tunnel of Love Express Tour, however, it vanished from the setlists until Springsteen briefly revived the song for some performances on the 2005 Devils & Dust Tour. On May 6, 2014, the song was performed for the first time in 26 years with the E Street Band on their 2014 High Hopes Tour stop in Houston, Texas.

== Personnel ==
According to authors Philippe Margotin and Jean-Michel Guesdon:

- Bruce Springsteen – vocals, guitars, bass, synthesizers, percussion, drum machine programming (with Toby Scott)
- Patti Scialfa – backing vocals

== Cover versions ==
Cover versions of "One Step Up" have been recorded by Clive Gregson and Christine Collister, Kenny Chesney, Bad Radio, Martyn Joseph, The Seldom Scene, Paul Cebar and Eddie Vedder, among others.
