= Chimes of Freedom: The Politics of Bob Dylan's Art =

2003 book by Mike Marqusee

- Cover
- Author: Mike Marqusee
- Language: English
- Subject: Dylan, Bob, 1941- --Criticism and interpretation. Protest songs--United States--History and criticism.
- Publisher: The New Press
- Publication date: 2003-10-01
- Publication place: United States
- Media type: Hardcover
- Pages: 327
- ISBN: 1-56584-825-X
- OCLC: 51991566
- Dewey Decimal: 782.42164/092 21
- LC Class: ML420.D98 M166 2003

Chimes of Freedom: The Politics of Bob Dylan's Art is a major work on the music and politics of Bob Dylan, written by Mike Marqusee (New York, The New Press, 2003, ISBN 1-56584-825-X).

The book takes its title from the song "Chimes of Freedom", which is a transitional work between Dylan's earlier 'protest' style and his later more free-flowing obscure and poetic style.

Marqusee discusses Dylan's early influence by Woody Guthrie, his involvement with the protest movement, his ready youthful empathy with the Civil Rights Movement and with those in poverty within the US; and his increasing disillusionment in the mid-sixties with protest politics. This was paralleled musically by his moving away from the use of a simple acoustic guitar, to a full backing group; and lyrically, by his evolution of a highly complex poetic style which influenced popular music for a generation.
