= Brilliant Disguise =

1987 single by Bruce Springsteen

Single by Bruce Springsteen

from the album Tunnel of Love
- B-side: "Lucky Man"
- Released: September 17, 1987
- Recorded: February – March 1987
- Studio: Thrill Hill East (Springsteen's home studio)
- Genre: Pop rock
- Length: 4:13
- Label: Columbia
- Songwriter: Bruce Springsteen
- Producers: Jon Landau, Bruce Springsteen, Chuck Plotkin

Bruce Springsteen singles chronology
"Fire" (1987)	"Brilliant Disguise" (1987)	"Tunnel of Love" (1987)

Music video
- Brilliant Disguise on Youtube.com

"Brilliant Disguise" is a song by the American singer-songwriter Bruce Springsteen from his 1987 album Tunnel of Love. It was released as the first single from the album, reaching the No. 5 position on the Billboard Hot 100 chart and No. 1 on the Mainstream Rock chart in the United States. The follow-up single, "Tunnel of Love", also reached No. 1 on the Mainstream Rock Tracks chart, giving Springsteen two consecutive No. 1's. The single reached the top 10 in four additional countries including Canada and Ireland and the top 20 in Australia, Netherlands and the United Kingdom. "Brilliant Disguise" was nominated for Best Male Pop Vocal Performance at the 1988 Grammy Awards.

== History ==
Like much of the Tunnel of Love album, "Brilliant Disguise" was recorded by Springsteen at his home studio, called Thrill Hill East, in Rumson, New Jersey. On February 5, 1987, he recorded "Is That You", playing all instruments himself. He finished the song by month's end, retitling it "Brilliant Disguise". Several members of the E Street Band, including Roy Bittan on keyboards (where the 40th Roland D-50 internal patch "Rock Organ" was heard), Danny Federici on organ and Max Weinberg on drums, were recorded during March, and overdubbed to the master by engineer Toby Scott.

The lyrics of "Brilliant Disguise" represent a confession of self-doubt on the part of the singer. The emotions expressed in the song include confusion, jealousy and anxiety about whether the singer's wife has become a stranger to him. The song deals with the masks people wear and the bitterness that can ensue when we realize the darkness that may lie behind those masks. The parallels with Springsteen's personal life at the time are evident: he had recently married then-model and actress Julianne Phillips, and the two divorced in 1989. The references to marital problems are quite direct, as in the lyrics: "Oh, we stood at the altar / The gypsy swore our future was right / But come the wee wee hours / Well maybe, baby, the gypsy lied."

The song's quiet power builds slowly. The sound is scaled back from the typical E Street Band sound. The singer struggles to do things right, but it doesn't help. He can't trust either himself or his wife. Both he and his wife continue to play their roles – he of a "faithful man", she of a "loving woman", but the singer is nonetheless wracked with self-doubt. A key line towards the end of the song — "I wanna know if it's you I don't trust / Because I damn sure don't trust myself" — sums up the emotions that resonate throughout the song, and indeed the entire second side of the Tunnel of Love album. Cash Box called it "a pleasing sampling of pop/rock."

Springsteen stated "after '85 I'd had enough and turned inward to write about men, women and love, things that have previously been on the periphery of my work."

The song was later released on the compilation album The Essential Bruce Springsteen.

"Brilliant Disguise" has been listed as one of the all-time great songs in Toby Creswell's "1001 songs" and as one of the 7500 most important songs from 1944 through 2000 by Bruce Pollock. It was ranked as the No. 7 single of 1987 by the Village Voice and the No. 51 single of 1987 by the New Musical Express.

The photograph on the original release picture sleeve was taken by Springsteen's sister Pamela Springsteen.

== Video ==
Like several other music videos from the Tunnel of Love album, including "Tunnel of Love", "One Step Up" and "Tougher Than the Rest", the video for "Brilliant Disguise" was directed by Meiert Avis. It was filmed on October 8, 1987 at Fort Hancock, Sandy Hook, New Jersey.

The video of the song, shot in black and white, effectively reflects its emotions. The setting is the kitchen of a modest home, & the singer sits uncomfortably on the edge of a chair, facing the camera. He plays his guitar as he sings the lyrics about what it means to try to trust someone, looking straight into the camera, never flinching as it slowly pushes in, ending with an extreme close-up. This very personal performance can make it difficult to watch, but it effectively reflects the themes of the song.

Although the studio recording of the music was used in this video, Bruce Springsteen sang the vocal live, a technique used in later Springsteen music videos including "Better Days", "Streets of Philadelphia", and "Lonesome Day". The video was released on the VHS and DVD Video Anthology / 1978–88.

== Live performances ==
Despite the personal nature of the song, it has been reasonably popular in live performances. From the Tunnel of Love Express Tour that supported the initial release of the album through July 2005, the song received 184 live performances in concert, although most of these were in solo concerts rather than with the E Street Band.

== Personnel ==
According to authors Philippe Margotin and Jean-Michel Guesdon:

- Bruce Springsteen – vocals, guitars, keyboards, bass
- Roy Bittan – piano
- Danny Federici – organ
- Max Weinberg – percussion

== Charts ==
=== Weekly charts ===
Weekly chart performance for "Brilliant Disguise"
Chart (1987)	Peak position
Belgium (Ultratop 50 Flanders)	12
Canada Adult Contemporary (RPM)	1
Canada Top Singles (RPM)	9
Europe (Eurochart Hot 100)	12
Ireland (IRMA)	2
Italy (Musica e Dischi)	7
Italy Airplay (Music & Media)	7
Netherlands (Dutch Top 40)	15
Netherlands (Single Top 100)	15
New Zealand (Recorded Music NZ)	26
Norway (VG-lista)	1
Quebec (ADISQ)	7
Sweden (Sverigetopplistan)	3
Switzerland (Schweizer Hitparade)	16
UK Singles (Official Charts)	20
US Billboard Hot 100	5

=== Year-end charts ===
Year-end chart performance for "Brilliant Disguise"
Chart (1987)	Rank
Canada Top Singles (RPM)	62
US Billboard Hot 100	86

== Certifications ==
Certifications for "Brilliant Disguise"
Region	Certification	Certified units/sales
Australia (ARIA)	Gold	35,000^{‡}
^{‡} Sales+streaming figures based on certification alone.

== See also ==
- List of number-one hits in Norway
- List of number-one mainstream rock hits (United States)
