= Tunnel of Love (Bruce Springsteen song) =

1987 single by Bruce Springsteen

Single by Bruce Springsteen

from the album Tunnel of Love
- B-side: "Two for the Road"
- Released: November 1987
- Recorded: June – July 1987 at Thrill Hill East (Springsteen's home studio)
- Genre: Rock, pop
- Length: 5:10
- Label: Columbia
- Songwriter: Bruce Springsteen
- Producers: Jon Landau, Bruce Springsteen, Chuck Plotkin

Bruce Springsteen singles chronology
"Brilliant Disguise" (1987)	"Tunnel of Love" (1987)	"One Step Up" (1988)

Music video
- Tunnel of Love on Youtube.com

"Tunnel of Love" is the title song by the American singer-songwriter Bruce Springsteen from his 1987 Tunnel of Love album. It was released as the second single from the album, reaching #9 on the Billboard Hot 100 as well as #12 on the Cash Box Top 100 . Like the first single from the album, "Brilliant Disguise", "Tunnel of Love" reached number one on the Mainstream Rock Tracks chart and reached the top twenty in Canada peaking at #17. The music video received five MTV Video Music Awards nominations, including Video of the Year and Best Male Video.

== History ==
Engineer Toby Scott recorded "Tunnel of Love" in late June thru early July 1987, with Springsteen on all instruments, at his home studio in Rumson, New Jersey. All songs for a new, nameless album had been recorded by this time, with "Lucky Man" in the album sequence. Next, Scott was sent to an amusement park in Point Pleasant, New Jersey to record sounds of a family riding a roller coaster. Finally, several members of the E Street Band recorded instrumental tracks that Scott added, replacing Springsteen's. Roy Bittan played synthesizers, Nils Lofgren lead guitar, Max Weinberg drums, and Patti Scialfa provided backing vocals. "Tunnel of Love" became the title track of the album, replacing "Lucky Man", which was released as the b-side of the first single, "Brilliant Disguise".

The song uses a fairground funhouse ride as a metaphor for marriage. The relationship described in the song has three principals - the singer, his wife, and all the things they are scared of. The singer feels that marriage should be simple ("man meets woman and they fall in love"), but recognizes that along the way the ride can become difficult and unpredictable. The characters in the song laugh when they see each other in the funhouse mirrors, but it is not clear if they are laughing out of humor, or laughing at each other in derision. The song notes that it is all too easy for two people to lose each other on the "funhouse ride" of marriage.

The music of the song echoes the lyrics. The music is complex and has half of the E Street Band playing on the song. Lofgren's surging guitar sound has been likened to the sound of the bickering couple, and the percussion and synthesizer add to the carnival atmosphere. The chanted vocal bridge at 3:40 in the song borrows the melody from the bridge of the Moody Blues' song "New Horizons" (from their 1972 album Seventh Sojourn).

The song was later released on the compilation album The Essential Bruce Springsteen.

The song has been listed as the #20 Best Rock and Roll single by Jimmy Guterman in 1992 and as one of the 7500 most important songs from 1944 through 2000 by Bruce Pollock. It was also ranked as the #10 single of 1987 by the Village Voice and the Single of the Year in 1987 by Rolling Stone.

== Music video ==
Like several other videos from the Tunnel of Love album, including "Brilliant Disguise", "One Step Up" and "Tougher Than the Rest", the video for "Tunnel of Love" was directed by Meiert Avis. The video narrative reflects the fun house described in the song. It was filmed at Palace Amusements, Asbury Park, New Jersey over November 16–17, 1987. The video was later released on the VHS and DVD Video Anthology / 1978-88.

== Live performance history ==
Despite the personal nature of the song, it has occasionally been performed live. Between the Tunnel of Love Express Tour that supported the initial release of the album through July 2005, the song received 71 live performances in concert. It received renewed attention on the 2007–2008 Magic Tour as a showcase for Patti Scialfa's singing and Nils Lofgren's guitar work.

== Personnel ==
According to authors Philippe Margotin and Jean-Michel Guesdon:

- Bruce Springsteen – vocals, guitars, special effects, bass, drum machine
- Nils Lofgren – lead guitar
- Roy Bittan – synthesizer
- Max Weinberg – percussion
- Patti Scialfa – vocals

== Chart performance ==
Chart (1987–1988)	Peak position
Australia (Kent Music Report)	41
Canada Top Singles (RPM)	17
Ireland (IRMA)	22
Netherlands (Dutch Top 40)	38
Netherlands (Single Top 100)	39
New Zealand (Recorded Music NZ)	48
Quebec (ADISQ)	26
UK Singles (Official Charts)	45
US Cash Box Top 100	12
US Billboard Hot 100	9
US Mainstream Rock (Billboard)	1

== See also ==
- List of number-one mainstream rock hits (United States)
