= Tougher Than the Rest =

1988 single by Bruce Springsteen

Single by Bruce Springsteen

from the album Tunnel of Love
- B-side: "Roulette"
- Released: June 6, 1988 (UK)
- Recorded: Between January 1 and May 15, 1987
- Studio: Thrill Hill East, Rumson, New Jersey
- Genre: Rock
- Length: 4:35
- Label: Columbia
- Songwriter: Bruce Springsteen
- Producers: Jon Landau, Bruce Springsteen, Chuck Plotkin

Bruce Springsteen singles chronology
"One Step Up" (1988)	"Tougher Than the Rest" (1988)	"Spare Parts" (1988)

Music video
- Tougher Than the Rest on Youtube.com

"Tougher Than the Rest" is a song by the American singer-songwriter Bruce Springsteen from his 1987 Tunnel of Love album. It was released as a single in some countries, following "Brilliant Disguise" and the title track, but was not released as a single in the United States. It reached as high as No. 3 on the Swiss charts, and also reached the Top 20 in the United Kingdom, the Netherlands and Austria. While the song is not one of his most popular ones in the United States, it sold much better in the United Kingdom and is one of Springsteen's most beloved songs in Europe.

== History ==
Like much of the Tunnel of Love album, "Tougher Than the Rest" was recorded in Springsteen's home studio, Thrill Hill East, Rumson, New Jersey, between January and May 1987, with several members of the E Street Band. On this song, Springsteen played several instruments and is backed by Danny Federici on organ and Max Weinberg on percussion. Although it was originally written as a rockabilly song, the final version has a slower and more methodical rhythm.

On the Tunnel of Love album, "Tougher Than the Rest" is the second song, following the acoustic "Ain't Got You", and introduces the sound that will permeate the remainder of the album. The synthesizer sound is layered and melodic and the drum sound is moody, heavy and menacing. Springsteen's vocal is also menacing and boastful as he sings the simple but elegant lyrics detailing his infatuation.

Both the singer and the woman he is singing to appear to be on the rebound from prior relationships. The singer recognizes that he is not a "handsome Dan" or a "sweet talking Romeo" and admits that he has "been around a time or two". He is not bothered with the possibility that the woman may have "been around too." Although the singer knows how messy and rough love can be, he claims that he is ready for it, but insists that the woman must also be equally tough and willing to take chances. The song is in some ways reminiscent of Springsteen's earlier song "Thunder Road", in which the singer wants to take the woman away, even though he tells her that "you ain't a beauty but hey you're alright". But unlike the earlier song, in this song the singer's goals are more realistic – rather than looking to run away with the woman, here he just wants to ask the woman to dance. In the context of this song the phrase, 'There's another dance, all you have to do is say yes,' is an allusion to taking a chance and falling in love. This is echoed in the song "Girls in their Summer Clothes" which includes the line "Love's a fools' dance, I ain't got no sense, but I've still got my feet."

The music video features live concert footage interspersed with vignettes of couples made at venues on his "Tunnel of Love Express" tour. The video includes both gay and lesbian pairs interspersed with heterosexual couples as representatives of the artist's fans. Springsteen included this explicitly homosexual imagery with neither fanfare nor exploitation. Like several other music videos from the Tunnel of Love album, including "Brilliant Disguise", "Tunnel of Love" and "One Step Up", the video for "Tougher Than The Rest" was directed by Meiert Avis. The video was later released on the VHS and DVD Video Anthology / 1978–88.

== Live performance history ==
"Tougher Than the Rest" has been reasonably popular in live performances. Next to "Brilliant Disguise", this song is the only other song from the album to receive several appearances live. From the Tunnel of Love Express Tour (where it typically opened the second set) that supported the initial release of the album through July 2005, the song received 98 live performances in concert. A live version of the song, recorded on April 27, 1988 at Los Angeles Memorial Sports Arena was released on the EP Chimes of Freedom. That version runs 6:39. This is the version which is displayed in the music video.

== Personnel ==
According to authors Philippe Margotin and Jean-Michel Guesdon:

- Bruce Springsteen – vocals, guitars, harmonica, drum machine
- Danny Federici – organ
- Max Weinberg – snare drum, cymbals, maracas, tambourine

== Cover versions ==
- Emmylou Harris recorded the song for her 1990 album Brand New Dance.
- A cover by Chris LeDoux peaked at number 67 on the Billboard Hot Country Singles & Tracks chart in 1995.
- Other cover versions have been recorded by Title Tracks, Everything but the Girl, The Mendoza Line, Darren Hayes, Travis Tritt, Shawn Colvin, Angel Olsen, Camera Obscura, and Nation of Language.
- Cher performed the song during her 1990 Heart of Stone Tour and it is included in her Live at the Mirage DVD of that tour.
- We Are Augustines also covered the song, on their iTunes Session album.
- Midland covered the song as a B-side to "Burn Out", via Spotify, and regularly perform it in their live shows.
- Australian singer Jimmy Barnes covered the song for his 2019 studio album My Criminal Record.
- John Mayer performed an acoustic version at his live show in Dublin on October 16, 2019. Mayer said the song was a birthday present to himself as it is one of his "favourite songs in the world".

== Charts ==
=== Weekly charts ===
Weekly chart performance for "Tougher Than the Rest"
Chart (1988)	Peak position
Australia (ARIA)	35
Austria (Ö3 Austria Top 40)	11
Belgium (Ultratop 50 Flanders)	22
Europe (Eurochart Hot 100)	38
Ireland (IRMA)	10
Italy (Musica e Dischi)	13
Netherlands (Dutch Top 40)	13
Netherlands (Single Top 100)	17
Switzerland (Schweizer Hitparade)	3
UK Singles (Official Charts)	13
West Germany (GfK)	25

=== Year-end charts ===
Year-end chart performance for "Tougher Than the Rest"
Chart (1988)	Position
Netherlands (Dutch Top 40)	96

== Certifications ==
Certifications for "Tougher Than the Rest"
Region	Certification	Certified units/sales
Australia (ARIA)	Gold	35,000^{‡}
Denmark (IFPI Danmark)	Gold	45,000^{‡}
^{‡} Sales+streaming figures based on certification alone.
