= Chimes of Freedom (EP) =

EP by Bruce Springsteen
- Released: August 1, 1988
- Recorded: March 28 – July 3, 1988
- Genre: Rock
- Length: 24:11
- Label: Columbia
- Producer: Bruce Springsteen, Jon Landau, Chuck Plotkin

Bruce Springsteen chronology
Tunnel of Love (1987)	Chimes of Freedom (1988)	Human Touch (1992)

Bruce Springsteen and the E Street Band chronology
Tunnel of Love (1987)	Chimes of Freedom (1988)	Greatest Hits (1995)

Alternative covers
- US reissue cover

Professional ratings
Review scores
Source	Rating
Allmusic	2.5/5 stars
Pitchfork	6.4/10
The Village Voice	B−

Chimes of Freedom is a live EP by the American singer-songwriter Bruce Springsteen. It was released in 1988 to support the multi-artist Human Rights Now! Tour in benefit of Amnesty International. This tour was announced near the end of a first-set radio broadcast during Springsteen's July 3, 1988, show in Stockholm, Sweden, after which Bob Dylan's "Chimes of Freedom" was performed. The performance of "Chimes of Freedom" on this EP peaked at number 16 on the Mainstream Rock charts in mid-late 1988.

== Background ==
The other tracks were also recorded on earlier American stops of Springsteen and the E Street Band's 1988 Tunnel of Love Express Tour, which also featured the Miami Horns. Most notable is the slowed-down acoustic rendition of "Born to Run." "Be True" was originally released as a studio recording on a vinyl single as the B-side to "Fade Away" in 1980, and featured prominently as the second or third song of the shows.

== Release ==
The EP is certified gold in Canada in 1988, for over 50,000 copies sold.

In the original vinyl and cassette release, all tracks were at full length, while on compact disc (CD) "Chimes of Freedom" and "Tougher Than The Rest" were edited for length. The format used was the three-inch CD single, which limited the length that could be used. When re-released in the full size five-inch CD, the edited versions remained. Some later CD re-issues have restored it to full length, as well as the version released to iTunes

== Live performances ==
Springsteen performed the song in 1988 during the "Human Rights Now!" tour. During that tour, Springsteen led a group performance of "Chimes of Freedom" featuring the other artists on the tour: Tracy Chapman, Sting, Peter Gabriel, and Youssou N'Dour, with each taking turns on the song's verses. On July 19, 1988, Bruce Springsteen and the E-Street Band played the song live when performing a concert in East Berlin. Among the audience, many interpreted the song lyrics as wishing for the fall of the GDR.

Springsteen and the E Street Band performed the song for the first time in 37 years on May 14, 2025, to close out their show in Manchester on their "Land of Hope and Dreams Tour".

== Track listing ==
All tracks are written by Bruce Springsteen, except where noted.

No.	Title	Writer(s)	Length
1.	"Tougher Than the Rest" (Recorded April 27, 1988, at Los Angeles Memorial Sports Arena)		6:39
2.	"Be True" (Recorded March 28, 1988, at Joe Louis Arena in Detroit)		4:48
3.	"Chimes of Freedom" (Recorded July 3, 1988, at Stockholms Olympiastadion)	Bob Dylan	7:21
4.	"Born to Run" (Recorded April 27, 1988, at Los Angeles Memorial Sports Arena)		5:23

== Personnel ==
- Bruce Springsteen – lead vocals, guitar, harmonica
- Roy Bittan – synthesizer, piano
- Clarence Clemons – saxophone, percussion
- Danny Federici – organ
- Nils Lofgren – guitar
- Patti Scialfa – vocals, guitar
- Garry Tallent – bass guitar
- Max Weinberg – drums
- Mario Cruz – saxophone
- Eddie Manion – saxophone
- Mark Pender – trumpet
- Richie "La Bamba" Rosenberg – trombone
- Mike Spengler – trumpet
