= Be True =

Single by Bruce Springsteen
- A-side: Fade Away; Cadillac Ranch (France)
- Released: 1981
- Recorded: July 18, 1979
- Studio: Power Station, New York City
- Genre: Pop rock
- Length: 3:43
- Label: Columbia
- Songwriter: Bruce Springsteen
- Producers: Jon Landau, Bruce Springsteen, Steven Van Zandt

"Be True" is a song by Bruce Springsteen. It was recorded on July 18, 1979 at The Power Station in New York in one of the early recording sessions for Bruce Springsteen's album The River. It was not released on the album, but in 1981 it was released as the B-side to the single release of "Fade Away", a song taken from The River album. According to Springsteen, "Be True" was left off The River album in favor of the song "Crush on You", a decision he has a hard time understanding in retrospect. Springsteen was already second guessing his decision to exclude "Be True" from The River before the album was even released.

== Composition ==
"Be True" is a mid-tempo pop rock song. It had been slated to be included on The Ties That Bind, a single album Springsteen had submitted to his record company in 1979 but then pulled back to be replaced by The River. Music critic Clinton Heylin considers it one of the "centrepieces" of the would-be album. AllMusic critic Mark Deming notes that unlike many songs in which movies are used "as a symbol of people’s hopes and dreams," in "Be True" those dreams "stand in the way of a better reality." Its lyrics, which "contrast the romance of life in movies with the loneliness of real life" fit with one of the major themes of The River, that of the "conflict between dreams and reality." According to author Jane Skinner Sawyers, the lyrics of the refrain. "You be true to me/And I'll be true to you" ""sum up Springsteen's philosophy." Sawyer considers that its sweetness and tenderness would have made it a top hit had it been released in the 1960s.

== Recording history ==
"Be True" went through several versions before its final incarnation. The original version, recorded in the first half of 1979, was titled "Mary Lou", which was intended as a "really catchy three minute pop tune" which "moved lyrically" and "linked together in a certain way". In "Mary Lou", the singer sings to a woman he is interested in that she should not sell herself cheap but rather "be true to [herself] in some fashion." According to Springsteen, the theme was "how do you find yourself through the falseness of some of those things." The second version of the song, officially "Little White Lies", but also known as "White Lies" and "Don't Do It To Me", was recorded in June 1979. It contains an intro similar to that on the Rolling Stones' single "Paint It Black". Heylin claims that this version "explodes the moment the drums kick in" and that drummer Max Weinberg regards this version as one of his favorite E Street Band songs. The final incarnation of "Be True" was recorded on July 18, 1979.

== Release history ==
In France, it was released as the B-side of the "Cadillac Ranch" single, and in Spain it was released as the B-side of the "Sherry Darling" single. Although left off the album and released only as a B-side of a single, "Be True" reached #42 on the Billboard Mainstream Rock chart. A featured selection on the 1988 Tunnel of Love Express, a live version from that tour was included on the Chimes of Freedom EP. The live version also appeared on various different formats to promote the "Tougher Than The Rest" single release the same year. Eventually the studio version of "Mary Lou" and "Be True" were released on the Bruce Springsteen album Tracks, a 4-disc box set released in 1998. "Little White Lies" was released on The Ties That Bind: The River Collection in 2015, along with "Mary Lou" and "Be True"; however, there are two circulating versions of "Little White Lies" that share the same music, but are lyrically two completely different songs. The unofficial studio "bootleg" version uses the same lyrics found in "Mary Lou" and "Be True" and does not contain "little white lies" anywhere in the lyrics, whereas the first verse from the official studio version of "Little White Lies" released in 2015 later appeared in "Loose Ends".

== Personnel ==
According to authors Philippe Margotin and Jean-Michel Guesdon:

- Bruce Springsteen – vocals, guitars
- Roy Bittan – piano
- Clarence Clemons – saxophone, tambourine
- Danny Federici – organ, glockenspiel
- Garry Tallent – bass
- Steven Van Zandt – guitars, vocal harmonies
- Max Weinberg – drums
