= Toby Scott =

American record producer

- Born: Toby Warren Scott; October 30, 1948 (age 77)
- Education: Santa Barbara City College
- Occupations: Music recording engineer, mixer, record producer
- Employer: Thrill Hill Recording 1982-2017
- Organization(s): Cabin 6, Inc., Toby Scott Productions Inc
- Honours: 20 Platinum Records
- Website: tobyscottaudio.com

Toby Warren Scott is an American record producer, engineer and sound mixer. In addition to serving as an engineer on 18 Bruce Springsteen albums and numerous live performances, Scott has also recorded artists including Bob Dylan, Natalie Merchant, Steve Perry, Bette Midler, Blue Öyster Cult, Alison Goldfrapp, Tommy Tutone and Little Steven & The Disciples Of Soul.

== Early life and music career ==
Born in 1948, Scott attended high school in Santa Barbara, California, where he began playing guitar and piano, and he later joined a rock band as bass player on the local garage and party circuit. He became a music major in college while continuing to play in bands, and started managing and producing several local acts, acquiring contracts and recording their music in studios. Scott moved to Los Angeles in 1975, where he was hired at Clover Studios. After two years, he had become the Chief Engineer and Co-Manager of Clover.

== Association with Bruce Springsteen ==
A milestone in Scott's career occurred in Spring 1978, when Chuck Plotkin asked him to remix a song for one of his clients, Bruce Springsteen, for Darkness on the Edge of Town. "After we spent one or two days on it, we sequenced the record and had it mastered", Toby recounted. The song, "Prove It All Night", was also released as the first single. Springsteen returned to Clover Studios with co-producer Plotkin in May 1980, to mix his fifth album, The River. Twenty-five songs were mixed for the album, plus additional tracks designated as "b-sides" for single releases. After the album was released, Springsteen asked Scott to perform the remote recording for 30 shows during the course of his 1980-81 US tour. After mixing Gary U.S. Bonds' On the Line album in March 1982, for which Springsteen wrote seven songs and co-produced them with Steven Van Zandt, Scott was asked to fly to New York to mix Van Zandt's first album, Men Without Women, and to begin recording Springsteen's seventh album. "From noon until six, I was working at the Hit Factory, mixing Steve Van Zandt, and then from seven until one in the morning I was with Bruce at The Power Station, recording basic tracks", Scott explained. Eventually, Steve was so excited by the work Scott was doing with the mixes and the perspective, he wrote four more songs to record and mix, which extended Scott's trip to New York to four months. For the Nebraska album, Scott was tasked with transferring the Nebraska demos from a cassette Springsteen had carried in his pocket for three months, to a higher quality tape for mastering. "The album sounds the way it does because of all those factors, the multiple tapes, the dirty heads...it's all part of the overall atmosphere that Bruce liked about the songs", said Toby, after he had completed the task. Scott moved permanently to the Big Apple in the Fall of 1983. Recording sessions for Springsteen's seventh album extended to March 1984, finally released in June with the title, Born in the U.S.A.

Continuing independent projects in New York and Los Angeles, he also recorded many live Springsteen shows on tour during 1984–1985. In late 1986, Scott began putting together Thrill Hill Recording, a studio built inside a garage apartment in New Jersey. That was completed, and recording began on the Tunnel of Love in January 1987. By this time, both men acknowledged Scott's responsibilities were now devoted exclusively to Springsteen. While Springsteen took his band and entourage on the Tunnel of Love Express Tour in 1988, Scott headed to the Los Angeles and Beverly Hills to upgrade the Thrill Hill West facilities. Scott was responsible for selecting materials and electronics, hiring specialists, and jumping back on a plane anytime he was needed. On January 6, 1991, Scott established permanent residence in Whitefish, Montana, then continued commuting to the West or East Coasts to join Springsteen regularly. This association continued with his role evolving to include “Production Supervisor” on albums Springsteen used an alternate engineer. In addition, Scott continued directing the archiving of Springsteen's extensive audio and video catalog and mixing concerts for release as “The Archive Concert Series” for download from the Springsteen website.

== Current career ==
In late 2017, by mutual agreement, Scott parted company with Springsteen. Currently, Scott is a freelance engineer and mixer, working out of his Cabin 6 studio in Whitefish, Montana. He has recently mixed and recorded a number of artists in country, rock, pop, jazz and classical. He is currently involved in a film-scoring project that is soon to be completed at Skywalker Ranch.
