= Chimes of Freedom (song) =

1964 song by Bob Dylan

Song by Bob Dylan

from the album Another Side of Bob Dylan
- Released: August 8, 1964
- Recorded: June 9, 1964
- Studio: CBS 30th Street, New York City
- Genre: Folk
- Length: 7:10
- Label: Columbia
- Songwriter: Bob Dylan
- Producer: Tom Wilson

Audio sample
- file; help

"Chimes of Freedom" is a song written and performed by Bob Dylan and featured on his Tom Wilson-produced 1964 album Another Side of Bob Dylan. The song depicts the thoughts and feelings of the singer and his companion as they shelter from a lightning storm under a doorway after sunset. The singer expresses his solidarity with the downtrodden and oppressed, believing that the thunder is tolling in sympathy for them.

Initially, critics described the song as showing the influence of the symbolist poetry of Arthur Rimbaud, but more recent biographers of Dylan have linked the origins of the song to verses the songwriter had written as a response to the assassination of President Kennedy in 1963. Some commentators and Dylan biographers have assessed the song as one of Dylan's most significant compositions, and critic Paul Williams has described it as Dylan's Sermon on the Mount.

The song has been covered many times by different artists, including the Byrds, Jefferson Starship, Youssou N'Dour, Bruce Springsteen, and U2.

== Bob Dylan's version ==
"Chimes of Freedom" was written shortly after the release of Dylan's The Times They Are a-Changin' album in early 1964 during a road trip that he took across America with musician Paul Clayton, journalist Pete Karman, and road manager Victor Maymudes. It was written at about the same time as "Mr. Tambourine Man", which author Clinton Heylin has judged to be similarly influenced by the symbolism of Arthur Rimbaud. There are conflicting accounts about when during the trip this song was written. Some Dylan biographers state that he wrote the song on a portable typewriter in the back of a car the day after visiting civil rights activists Bernice Johnson and Cordell Reagon in Atlanta, Georgia. However, a handwritten lyric sheet from the Waldorf Astoria Hotel in Toronto, Canada that was reproduced in The Bob Dylan Scrapbook 1956-1966 indicates that this story cannot be entirely true, since Dylan was in Toronto in late January and early February, before the road trip on which the song was supposedly written occurred. So, although parts of the song may have been written on the road trip, Dylan had started working on the song earlier.

In his memoir, The Mayor of MacDougal Street, Dave Van Ronk gave his account of the song's origins:

Bob Dylan heard me fooling around with one of my grandmother's favorites, "The Chimes of Trinity", a sentimental ballad about Trinity Church, that went something like, Tolling for the outcast, tolling for the gay/Tolling for the [something something], long since passed away/As we whiled away the hours, down on old Broadway/And we listened to the chimes of Trinity. He made me sing it for him a few times until he had the gist of it, then reworked it into "Chimes of Freedom". Her version was better.

The first public performance of the song took place in early 1964, either at the Civic Auditorium in Denver on February 15, or at the Berkeley Community Theater in Berkeley, California, on February 22. "Chimes of Freedom" was an important part of Dylan's live concert repertoire throughout most of 1964, although by the latter part of that year he had ceased performing it and would not perform the song again until 1987, when he revisited it for concerts with the Grateful Dead and with Tom Petty and the Heartbreakers.

== Recording ==
With Dylan's commercial profile on the rise, Columbia was now urging Dylan to release a steady stream of recordings. Upon Dylan's return to New York, studio time was quickly scheduled, with Tom Wilson back as producer. The entire album Another Side of Bob Dylan was recorded in one long session on June 9, 1964, with Tom Wilson as producer. During the recording session, Dylan needed seven takes to get "Chimes of Freedom" right, though it was one of just three songs that Dylan recorded that day which he had previously performed in concert.

The entirety of the first (and only) recording session was held June 9 at Columbia's Studio A, located at 799 Seventh Avenue in New York City. According to Heylin, "while polishing off a couple of bottles of Beaujolais," Dylan recorded 14 original compositions, in a single three-hour session between 7pm and 10pm that night, 11 of which were chosen for the final album. The three that were ultimately rejected were "Denise Denise," "Mr. Tambourine Man," and "Mama, You Been on My Mind." Nat Hentoff's article on Dylan for The New Yorker, published in late October 1964, includes remarkable descriptions of the June 9 session. Hentoff describes in considerable detail the atmosphere in the CBS recording studio and Dylan's own asides and banter with his friends in the studio, with the session's producers, and Hentoff himself.

== Lyrics ==
The lyrics of the song are written in six stanzas of seven verses each. Each of the stanzas shares the same one verse refrain "An' we gazed upon the chimes of freedom flashing". The symbolism of the lyrics makes repeat use of a dual metaphor of freedom represented by the chimes or tolling of a bell on the one hand, and the enlightenment associated with freedom represented by thunder and lightning. The lyrics are located symbolically in the darkness after sunset (after "sundown") up until "midnight's" tolling of the chimes on the same evening. The initial verses of the song describe a fierce and unforgiving storm giving way at the end of the song to a partial lifting of the mist. The narrative of the song's lyrics has been described as depicting the point of view of the underprivileged and indigent seeking freedom.

== Release ==
Despite the song's appeal to cover artists, it has appeared sparingly on Dylan's compilation and live albums. It was, however, included on the 1967 European compilation album Bob Dylan's Greatest Hits 2. A very early live performance of the song, at London's Royal Festival Hall, in May 1964, was released in 2018 on Live 1962-1966: Rare Performances From The Copyright Collections. In 1993 Dylan played the song in front of the Lincoln Memorial as part of Bill Clinton's first inauguration as U.S. president.

A version sung by Dylan and Joan Osborne in 1999 appears on the original television soundtrack album of the film titled The 60's. A recording of Dylan performing the song at the 1964 Newport Folk Festival was included on the 2005 album The Bootleg Series Vol. 7: No Direction Home: The Soundtrack. The same performance can also be seen on the 2007 DVD The Other Side of the Mirror: Live at Newport Folk Festival 1963-1965. In 2009, Dylan continued to perform "Chimes of Freedom" in concert, although he did not play the song live during the 23 years between late 1964 and 1987.

Chimes of Freedom: The Songs of Bob Dylan Honoring 50 Years of Amnesty International is a 4-CD charity compilation album featuring new recordings of 73 compositions by Bob Dylan by multiple artists, released on January 24, 2012. The set includes Dylan's original 1964 recording of the title song. Proceeds from the album were donated to the human rights organization Amnesty International. It debuted in the U.S. at number 11 on the Billboard 200 with 22,000 copies sold.

== Personnel ==
- Bob Dylan – vocals, acoustic guitar, harmonica
- Tom Wilson – production

== Reception and critical comments ==
"Chimes of Freedom" has been widely discussed by Dylan's many interpreters, including biographers, journalists, academics and music historians.

Critic Paul Williams has described the song as Dylan's Sermon on the Mount. The song is a lyrical expression of feelings evoked while watching a lightning storm. The singer and a companion are caught in a thunderstorm in mid-evening and the pair of them duck into a doorway, where they are both transfixed by one lightning flash after another. The natural phenomena of thunder and lightning appear to take on auditory and ultimately emotional aspects to the singer, with the thunder experienced as the tolling of bells and the lightning bolts appearing as chimes. Eventually, the sights and sounds in the sky become intermixed in the mind of the singer, as evidenced by the lines:

As majestic bells of bolts struck shadows in the sounds,
Seeming to be the chimes of freedom flashing.

Over the course of the song, the sky and mist begin to partially clear and the lyrics can be interpreted as a proclamation of the hope that as the sky clears in the progress of the difficult night, that all the world's people will endure their setbacks and eventually proclaim their successful survival to the sound of the chimes of freedom.

In his 2003 book, Chimes of Freedom: The Politics of Bob Dylan's Art, Mike Marqusee notes that the song marks a transition between Dylan's earlier protest song style (a litany of the down-trodden and oppressed, in the second half of each verse) and his later more free-flowing poetic style (the fusion of images of lightning, storm and bells in the first half). In this later style, which is influenced by 19th century French symbolist poet Arthur Rimbaud, the poetry is more allusive, filled with "chains of flashing images." In this song, rather than support a specific cause as in his earlier protest songs, he finds solidarity with all people who are downtrodden or otherwise treated unjustly, including unwed mothers, the disabled, refugees, outcasts, those unfairly jailed, "the luckless, the abandoned and forsaked," and, in the final verse, "the countless confused, accused, misused, strung out ones and worse" and "every hung-up person in the whole wide universe." By having the chimes of freedom toll for both rebels and rakes, the song is more inclusive in its sympathies than previous protest songs, such as "The Times They Are A-Changin'", written just the prior year. After "Chimes of Freedom", Dylan's protest songs no longer depicted social reality in the black and white terms which he renounced in "My Back Pages", but rather use satirical surrealism to make their points.

In addition to Rimbaud's symbolism, Oliver Hopkins has suggested that the song also shows the influence of the alliterative poetry of Gerard Manley Hopkins, the poetic vision of William Blake, and the violent drama, mixed with compassionate and romantic language, of William Shakespeare. Dylan had used rain in a symbolic manner in earlier songs, notably "A Hard Rain's A-Gonna Fall".

Clinton Heylin has suggested the assassination of U.S. President, John F. Kennedy on November 22, 1963, as a possible inspiration for Dylan's song, although Dylan has denied that this is the case. Dylan drafted a number of poems after Kennedy's death on November 22, 1963. Heylin suggests one of those poems, a six-line piece, seems to contain the genesis of "Chimes of Freedom":

the colors of friday were dull/ as the cathedral bells were gently burnin'
strikin for the gentle/ strikin for the kind
strikin for the crippled ones/ and strikin for the blind.

Kennedy was killed on a Friday, and the cathedral bells in the poem have been interpreted as the church bells announcing his death. Heylin suggests that using a storm as a metaphor for the death of a president is comparable to Shakespeare's use of a storm in King Lear. By the time Dylan wrote the first draft of "Chimes of Freedom" the following February, it contained many of the elements of his poem from the end of Autumn after the death of the president, except that the crippled ones and the blind were changed to "guardians and protectors of the mind." In addition, the cathedral bells had become the "chimes of freedom flashing", as seen by two lovers who are sheltering in a cathedral doorway.

In his biography of Dylan, Bob Dylan in America, Sean Wilentz comments that shortly before Dylan met poet Allen Ginsberg, "Chimes of Freedom" started to come to form; later in 1964 and 1965, they would continue to influence each other. Wilentz states:

Dylan had already been experimenting with writing free verse, without intending that it would serve him as lyrics. Not long before he met Ginsberg, he poured out a poem about the day of Kennedy's murder... Pulled together, the lines would form part of what Dylan called the 'chain of flashing images' that soon went into 'Chimes of Freedom'—marking both Dylan's reconnection of those aesthetics and the transformation of those aesthetics into song. And in 1964 and 1965, Ginsberg and Dylan influenced each other as both of them recast their public images and their art.

Wilentz points out that Dylan's 1964 album Another Side of Bob Dylan, which included "Chimes", did not crack the Top 40 list; whereas The Times They Are A Changin, released earlier in 1964, reached number 20 on the album chart.

In Bob Dylan: Prophet, Mystic, Poet, Seth Rogovy called the song Dylan's "supreme poetic achievement." Rogovy described the song's "simple" scene:

[…] a couple takes refuge in a doorway of a church during a thurderstorm. Period. But never has a storm been so dynamically, so electrically, described. In six eight-line stanzas, Dylan paints a hallucinatory vision, a sensual display of lightning piercing darkness, revealing an unjust world and a world of redemption. Wrapped up in the song is all that has come before: the civil right symbolism of Blowin' in the Wind, the apolcalyptic surrealism of A Hard Rain's a- Gonna Fall, the tolling of a new day in The Times They Are a- Changin'.

Rogovy suggests an answer to one of the main questions asked in Dylan's lyrics by stating: "...The answer was blowin' in the wind out in the night in question; the answer is in poetry; the answer, my friend, is in a transcendent vision of universal freedom and justice for all".

In his 2012 book The Lives of Bob Dylan, Ian Bell follows Heylin in speculating that the genesis of "Chimes of Freedom" might lie in the verses Dylan wrote at the time of the Kennedy assassination, which contain the line "as cathedral bells were gently burnin". Bell also notes that the song echoes the imagery of "The Drunken Boat /Le Bateau ivre" by Arthur Rimbaud: "I know skies split by lightning, waterspouts/ And undertows, and tides: I know the night/ And dawn exulting like a crowd of doves".

Bell asserts that "Chimes" was "certainly something new, but also something flawed". He describes the song as both thrilling and "loosely and horribly overwritten". Bell suggests the theme of the song is that liberty took many forms, personal and political, civic and artistic, spiritual and physical. The significance of "Chimes" for Bell is that, although the song is too over-wrought and self-conscious to be a total success, it showed Dylan demolishing the barrier between poetry and song:

Anyone reading "Chimes" on the tyrannical page might pause before calling it a poem. Anyone listening would hesitate to call it just a song in the manner of "She Loves You" or anything written for the mass market in the 20th century . If it wasn't poetry, what was Dylan doing?

In In Search of the Real Bob Dylan, David Dalton, one of the founding editors of Rolling Stone magazine, commented that the song was written at the same time as "Mr Tambourine Man". Dalton gives a literary reading to the lyrics of "Chimes" as worthy of significant literary merit stating: "Dylan begins to type, 'Electric light still struck like arrows'... Lightning is an agent of change in classic American literature: it is the storm after which everything changes—the lightning storm in Moby-Dick, the storm in Huckleberry Finn, and the one in On the Road, just outside New Orleans. 'Lightning that liquifies the bones of the world,' William Burroughs called it." Dalton continues with a comparison of Dylan's writing of the lyrics in "Chimes" to Jack Kerouac and states: "The scenes in 'Chimes of Freedom' are lit up as if by strobe light—the way the Bible was written, they say, in brilliantly illuminated pictures. Dylan uses a cinematic method of writing, like Kerouac's—with slow motion jump cuts, and freeze frames."

In June 2026, CBS News included the song in its list of the 250 essential American songs of the past 250 years.

== Cover versions ==
=== The Byrds' version ===
"Chimes of Freedom"

Song by the Byrds

from the album Mr. Tambourine Man
- Released: June 21, 1965
- Recorded: April 22, 1965
- Studio: Columbia, Hollywood, California
- Genre: Folk rock
- Length: 3:51
- Label: Columbia
- Songwriter: Bob Dylan
- Producer: Terry Melcher

Audio sample
- "Chimes of Freedom": file; help

The Byrds released a version of "Chimes of Freedom" on their 1965 debut album, Mr. Tambourine Man. The song was the last track to be recorded for the album, but the recording session was marred by conflict. After the band had completed the song's instrumental backing track, guitarist and harmony vocalist David Crosby announced that he was not going to sing on the recording and was quitting the studio for the day. The reason for Crosby's refusal to sing the song has never been fully explained, but the fight between the guitarist and the band's manager, record producer Jim Dickson, ended with Dickson sitting on Crosby's chest, telling him, "The only way you're going to get through that door is over my dead body...You're going to stay in this room until you do the vocal." According to a number of people in the studio that day, Crosby burst into tears, but finally completed the song's harmony part with sterling results. Dickson himself noted in later years that his altercation with Crosby was a cathartic moment in which the singer "got it all out and sang like an angel."

The song went on to become a staple of the Byrds' live concert repertoire, until their breakup in 1973. The band also performed the song on the television programs Hullabaloo and Shindig!, and included it in their performance at the Monterey Pop Festival in 1967. The Byrds' performance of "Chimes of Freedom" at Monterey can be seen in the 2002 The Complete Monterey Pop Festival DVD box set.

The song was also performed by a reformed line-up of the Byrds featuring Roger McGuinn, David Crosby, and Chris Hillman in January 1989. In addition to its appearance on Mr. Tambourine Man, "Chimes of Freedom" has appeared on several Byrds' compilation albums, including The Byrds' Greatest Hits, The Byrds Play Dylan, The Very Best of The Byrds, and The Essential Byrds.

=== Bruce Springsteen version ===
"Chimes of Freedom"

Single by Bruce Springsteen
- Released: August 1, 1988
- Recorded: July 3, 1988
- Venue: Stockholm Olympic Stadium
- Genre: Rock
- Length: 7:21
- Label: Columbia
- Producers: Bruce Springsteen, Jon Landau, Chuck Plotkin

Bruce Springsteen singles chronology
| "Spare Parts" (1987) | "Chimes of Freedom" (1988) | "Human Touch" (1992) |

Bruce Springsteen & the E Street Band singles chronology
| "Fire" (1987) | "Chimes of Freedom" (1988) | "The Rising" (2002) |

Bruce Springsteen and the E Street Band first performed the song in 1978 but did not perform it again until 1988.

Springsteen's live cover version reached #16 on the Billboard Hot Mainstream Rock Tracks chart in 1988, though it was never released as a single. It was recorded in Stockholm on July 3, 1988, when Springsteen performed it during his Tunnel of Love Express tour. Springsteen used the performance to announce before a worldwide radio audience his role in the upcoming Human Rights Now! tour to benefit Amnesty International and mark the fortieth anniversary of the signing of the Universal Declaration of Human Rights. The song was subsequently released as the title track of the live Chimes of Freedom EP on August 1, 1988. Springsteen's performance has been described as rousing and fervent, transforming the song into a ringing anthem for the full E Street Band, without losing the power of the words evident in Dylan's solo performance. On the Human Rights Now! tour itself, Springsteen led a group performance of "Chimes of Freedom" featuring the other artists on the tour: Tracy Chapman, Sting, Peter Gabriel, and Youssou N'Dour, with each taking turns on the song's verses.

On July 19, 1988, Springsteen and the E Street Band played the song live when performing a concert in East Berlin. Among the audience, many interpreted the song lyrics as wishing for the fall of the GDR.

On May 21, 2025, Bruce Springsteen released the Land of Hope & Dreams EP. The four-track live recording features songs from the Land of Hope & Dreams Tour opener in Manchester on May 14, 2025, and includes a cover of "Chimes of Freedom", which Springsteen had not performed since 1988. Also included on the EP are Springsteen's remarks during the concert when he called President Donald Trump's administration "corrupt, incompetent, and treasonous". Trump responded by insulting Springsteen on social media and calling for a "major investigation" into him, Beyoncé, Oprah Winfrey, and Bono. On March 31, 2026, Springsteen and the E Street Band performed the song to close out the opening night of their 2026 Land of Hope and Dreams American Tour in Minneapolis.

=== Other covers ===
"Chimes of Freedom" has also been covered by artists as diverse as Phil Carmen, Jefferson Starship, Youssou N'Dour, Martyn Joseph, Joan Osborne, Starry Eyed and Laughing, Warren Zevon, and The West Coast Pop Art Experimental Band. Although U2 have never released a recording of the song, they played it live in concert during the late 1980s. The Senegalese musician Youssou N'Dour recorded a cover version of the song, in which he treats the song as an anthem for the many people in Africa struggling to survive. Jefferson Starship covered the song on their 2008 release, Jefferson's Tree of Liberty, with Paul Kantner, David Freiberg, and Cathy Richardson on vocals. The melody of "Chimes of Freedom" was deliberately borrowed by Billy Bragg for the song "Ideology", from his third album, Talking with the Taxman about Poetry, with Bragg's chorus "above the sound of ideologies clashing" echoing Dylan's "we gazed upon the chimes of freedom flashing". In addition, the Bon Jovi song "Bells of Freedom", from their Have a Nice Day album, is somewhat reminiscent of "Chimes of Freedom" in structure. Neil Young's song "Flags of Freedom" from his Living with War album mentions Dylan by name and melodically recalls the tune and verse structure of "Chimes of Freedom", though Young is listed as the song's only writer. The British band Starry Eyed and Laughing took their name from the opening line of the song's final verse.

"Chimes of Freedom" is one of seven Dylan songs whose lyrics were reset as a modern classical music arrangement for soprano and piano (or orchestra) by John Corigliano for his song cycle Mr. Tambourine Man: Seven Poems of Bob Dylan.

== Charts ==
| Year | Chart | Peak position |
|---|---|---|
| 1964 | US Billboard 200 | 43 |
| 1964 | UK Top 75 | 8 |

== See also ==
1964 in music
