= Bruce Pollock =

Canadian American academician and psychopharmacologist

Bruce Godfrey Pollock
- Born
- Occupations: Academician and psychopharmacologist

Academic background
- Education: BSc., Biological Sciences; MD; FRCPC., Psychiatry; PhD., Pharmacology
- Alma mater: University of Toronto; University of Pittsburgh

Academic work
- Institutions: University of Pittsburgh; University of Toronto

Bruce Godfrey Pollock is a Canadian American academician and psychopharmacologist. He is the professor emeritus of psychiatry and pharmacology at the University of Toronto.

Pollock's research focused on optimizing treatments for depression and dementia-related behavioral disturbances by studying neurochemical selectivity, pharmacokinetics, and age-related changes in drug metabolism and pharmacodynamics. He has been honored with awards for his work.

In 2008, Pollock was elected president of the American Association for Geriatric Psychiatry (AAGP). He is a Distinguished Life Fellow of the American Psychiatric Association (APA), a Distinguished Fellow of the Canadian Psychiatric Association (CPA), and a Member of the Order of Canada, appointed by the Governor General of Canada in 2023. He has also held editorial roles with journals such as the American Journal of Geriatric Psychiatry, Canadian Journal of Psychiatry, Clinical Pharmacology: Advances and Applications, and International Psychogeriatrics.

== Education and early career ==
After graduating from Upper Canada College, Pollock earned a B.Sc. in Biological Sciences in 1975 and an M.D. in 1979, both from the University of Toronto. In 1984, he concluded his postgraduate training with a Post-Doctoral Fellowship at the Western Psychiatric Institute and Clinic before receiving a Ph.D. in pharmacology from the University of Pittsburgh in 1987.

== Career ==
Pollock began his academic career at the University of Pittsburgh, as an assistant professor in the Departments of Psychiatry and Pharmacology from 1984 to 1990, later becoming an associate professor in 1991 and a professor from 1997 to 2011. He concurrently held the Sandra A. Rotman Chair in Neuropsychiatry at Baycrest's Rotman Research Institute from 2005 to 2010. In 2005, he joined the University of Toronto as a professor and director of the Division of Geriatric Psychiatry and was appointed the Peter and Shelagh Godsoe Endowed Chair in Late-Life Mental Health in 2019–2024 as well as co-chair of the Toronto Dementia Research Alliance in 2020. Since 2024, he has been serving as professor emeritus of psychiatry and pharmacology at the University of Toronto Faculty of Medicine.

Pollock worked as a medical professional, holding positions such as Attending Staff in the Mood Disorders Module and co-director of the Tourette's Syndrome Clinic at the Western Psychiatric Institute and Clinic. He was part of the Medical Staff at Presbyterian University Hospital's Division of Geriatrics and Neuropsychiatry from 1988 to 2009, and directed the Geriatric Psychopharmacology Program at Western Psychiatric Institute & Clinic from 1995 to 2009. In 2005, he joined Baycrest Hospital and the Centre for Addiction and Mental Health (CAMH), where he assumed the role of Vice President for Research from 2008 to 2020 and Director of the Campbell Family Mental Health Research Institute from 2012 to 2020, while also heading the Memory Clinic in the Geriatric Mental Health Program at CAMH from 2012 to 2018.

== Research ==
Pollock's research has centered on improving treatments for late-life depression and cognitive decline, emphasizing the impact of pharmacological factors and neuropsychological functioning in older adults and he also holds a patent for his work.

=== Pharmacodynamics, pharmacogenetics and pharmacokinetics of antidepressants in older adults ===
Pollock led studies on the use of metabolic testing for drug metabolism. His lab focused on understanding age-related shifts in drug metabolism essant and antipsychotic treatments for older populations, such as S-mephenytoin 4-hydroxylation (2C19) and debrisoquine hysdroxylations (CYP2D^). His work established that both major enzymes generally remain stable with age and that the majority of dysfunctional metabolism is due to interacting medications and medical conditions, with genetically slow and fast metabolizers persisting. Alongside colleagues, he explored escitalopram pharmacokinetics in depression patients, and noted that CYP2C19 genotype, age, and weight significantly impacted drug clearance. Moreover, he reviewed the effects of acute serotonin reuptake inhibition on amygdala function, learning that citalopram increased amygdala reactivity to salient stimuli, potentially explaining both antidepressant effects and agitation seen in early SSRI treatment.

Pollock also initiated research on the pharmacodynamic pharmacogenetics of antidepressants in older adults, analyzing the impact of allelic polymorphisms on response to antidepressants in the elderly and their effect on drug concentrations. He established that elderly patients with the ll genotype of 5-HTTLPR showed faster symptom reduction with paroxetine than those with the s allele, and that paroxetine concentration correlated with symptom improvement only in individuals with the short allele. Additionally, examining bupropion's metabolism in relation to CYP2D6, he found that it is neither metabolized by nor inhibits CYP2D6, though hydroxybupropion levels were higher in poor 2D6 metabolizers, potentially affecting its toxicity and effectiveness. Building upon this, he explored CYP2D6 gene variations and found that impaired enzyme activity in elderly patients led to higher nortriptyline plasma concentrations and lower required doses.

In a paper published in the Journal of Clinical Pharmacology, Pollock assessed the effect of estrogen replacement therapy on cytochrome P450 1A2-mediated caffeine metabolism in postmenopausal women, concluding that estradiol significantly reduced caffeine metabolic ratios, revealing CYP1A2 inhibition.

=== Efficacy and side effects of antidepressants in older patients ===
Pollock worked with Reynolds on several clinical trials, investigating the efficacy and side effects of antidepressants in older patients. In joint research with Benoit Mulsant, Jules Rosen, and Robert Sweet, he looked into the effects of SSRIs on platelet aggregation, cognitive function, balance, and sodium regulation, showing that paroxetineunlike nortriptyline, reduced elevated platelet activation markers in depressed patients with ischemic heart disease but also increased risk of gastrointestinal bleeding. He discovered that antidepressant treatment with paroxetine or nortriptyline improved mood in older depressed patients but did not restore cognitive function to normal levels. Evaluating the effect of nortriptyline and paroxetine on postural sway in elderly depressed patients, he found no change in postural sway after 6 weeks of treatment with either antidepressant. Furthermore, he determined the incidence and risk factors of paroxetine-induced hyponatremia in older patients, indicating that 12% developed hyponatremia, with lower body mass index and baseline sodium levels being significant risk factors.

=== Antipsychotics ===
Pollock emphasized the need for more geriatrics-focused clinical trials and advanced pharmacological methods to improve drug safety and personalization for elderly psychiatric patients. In collaboration with Robert Bies, he characterized the population pharmacokinetics of perphenazine in Clinical Antipsychotic Trials of Intervention Effectiveness (CATIE) patients, identifying that race and smoking status significantly influenced its clearance. In addition, he evaluated olanzapine concentration variability in patients with Alzheimer's and schizophrenia in CATIE, and observed that smoking status, sex, and race accounted for significant differences in drug clearance.

Comparing risperidone exposure consistency in Alzheimer's patients treated in psychiatric hospitals versus community care settings, Pollock showcased that exposure was more variable in the hospital setting. He further studied the relationship between risperidone and 9-hydroxy risperidone exposure and time to medication discontinuation, ascertaining that higher 9-hydroxy risperidone concentrations increased the risk of discontinuation due to inadequate effect or side effects.

=== Dementia management ===
Pollock questioned the common clinical practice of using antipsychotics for managing severe agitation or psychosis in dementia patients, leading controlled trials that demonstrated the benefits of serotonergic drugs for these symptoms instead. He developed and refined an assay to measure patients' serum anticholinergic burden from multiple medications, assessing its role in cognitive impairment and delirium in both healthy older adults and those with dementia.

== Awards and honors ==
- 2003 – Distinguished Scientist Award, American Association for Geriatric Psychiatry
- 2011 – Geriatric Psychiatry Research Award, American College of Psychiatrists
- 2014 – William B. Abrams Award in Geriatric Clinical Pharmacology, American Society for Clinical Pharmacology and Therapeutics
- 2015 – Distinguished Fellow, Canadian Psychiatric Association
- 2016 – Distinguished Life Fellow, American Psychiatric Association
- 2017 – Award for Outstanding Contributions in Geriatric Psychiatry, Canadian Academy of Geriatric Psychiatry
- 2021 – Mrazek Award in Psychiatric Pharmacogenomics, American Psychiatric Association
- 2023 – Member of the Order of Canada, Office of the Governor General of Canada

== Selected articles ==
- Laghrissi-Thode, F., Wagner, W. R., Pollock, B. G., Johnson, P. C., & Finkel, M. S. (1997). Elevated platelet factor 4 and β-thromboglobulin plasma levels in depressed patients with ischemic heart disease. Biological psychiatry, 42(4), 290–295.
- Roose, S. P., Laghrissi-Thode, F., Kennedy, J. S., Nelson, J. C., Bigger Jr, J. T., Pollock, B. G., ... & Gergel, I. (1998). Comparison of paroxetine and nortriptyline in depressed patients with ischemic heart disease. Jama, 279(4), 287–291.
- Pollock, B. G., Ferrell, R. E., Mulsant, B. H., Mazumdar, S., Miller, M., Sweet, R. A., ... & Kupfer, D. J. (2000). Allelic variation in the serotonin transporter promoter affects onset of paroxetine treatment response in late-life depression. Neuropsychopharmacology, 23(5), 587–590.
- Evans, D. L., Charney, D. S., Lewis, L., Golden, R. N., Gorman, J. M., Krishnan, K. R. R., ... & Valvo, W. J. (2005). Mood disorders in the medically ill: scientific review and recommendations. Biological psychiatry, 58(3), 175–189.
- Carnahan, R. M., Lund, B. C., Perry, P. J., Pollock, B. G., & Culp, K. R. (2006). The anticholinergic drug scale as a measure of drug‐related anticholinergic burden: associations with serum anticholinergic activity. The Journal of Clinical Pharmacology, 46(12), 1481–1486.
- Reynolds III, C. F., Dew, M. A., Pollock, B. G., Mulsant, B. H., Frank, E., Miller, M. D., ... & Kupfer, D. J. (2006). Maintenance treatment of major depression in old age. New England Journal of Medicine, 354(11), 1130–1138.
- Chew, M. L., Mulsant, B. H., Pollock, B. G., Lehman, M. E., Greenspan, A., Mahmoud, R. A., ... & Gharabawi, G. (2008). Anticholinergic activity of 107 medications commonly used by older adults. Journal of the American Geriatrics Society, 56(7), 1333–1341.
- Porsteinsson, A. P., Drye, L. T., Pollock, B. G., Devanand, D. P., Frangakis, C., Ismail, Z., ... & CitAD Research Group. (2014). Effect of citalopram on agitation in Alzheimer disease: the CitAD randomized clinical trial. Jama, 311(7), 682–691.
- Rajji, T.K., Bowie, C.R., Herrmann, N., Pollock, B.G., Lanctôt. K.L., Kumar, S., ... & PACt-MD Study Group. (2025) Slowing Cognitive Decline in Major Depressive Disorder and Mild Cognitive Impairment: A Randomized Clinical Trial. JAMA Psychiatry. Jan 1;82(1):12-21.
