= Arthur Conley =

American soul singer (1946–2003)

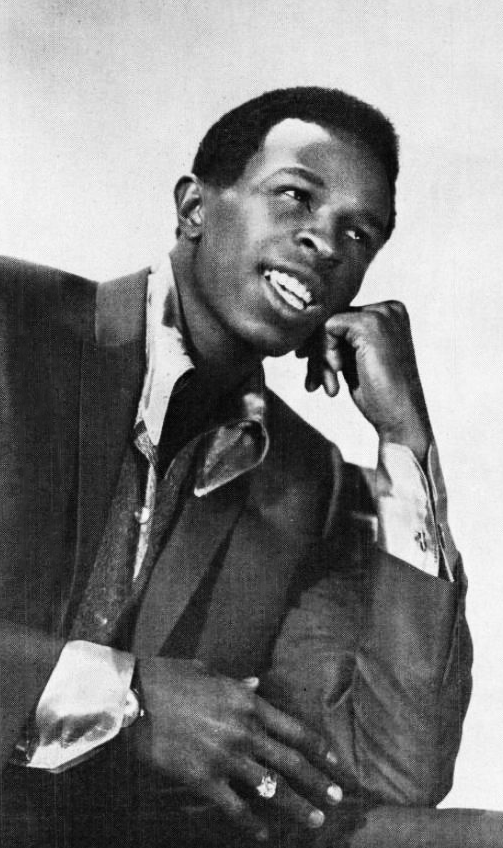
- Arthur Conley in 1967

Background information
- Also known as: Lee Roberts
- Born: Arthur Lee Conley; January 4, 1946; McIntosh County, Georgia, U.S.
- Died: November 17, 2003 (aged 57) Ruurlo, Netherlands
- Genre: Soul
- Occupation: Singer
- Years active: 1959–1988

Arthur Lee Conley (January 4, 1946 – November 17, 2003), also known in later years as Lee Roberts, was an American soul singer, best known for the 1967 hit "Sweet Soul Music".

== Early life ==
Conley was born in McIntosh County, Georgia, U.S., and grew up in Atlanta. He first recorded in 1959 as the lead singer of Arthur & the Corvets. With this group, he released three singles in 1963 and 1964—"Poor Girl", "I Believe", and "Flossie Mae"—on the Atlanta-based record label, NRC Records.

== Biography and career ==
In 1964, he moved to a new label (Baltimore's Ru-Jac Records) and released "I'm a Lonely Stranger". When Otis Redding heard this, he asked Conley to record a new version, which was released on Redding's own fledgling label Jotis Records, as only its second release. Conley met Redding in 1967. Together they rewrote the Sam Cooke song "Yeah Man" into "Sweet Soul Music", which, at Redding's insistence, was released on the Atco-distributed label Fame Records, and was recorded at FAME studios in Muscle Shoals, Alabama. It proved to be a massive hit, going to the number two position on the U.S. chart and the Top Ten across much of Europe. "Sweet Soul Music" sold over one million copies, and was awarded a gold disc.

After several years of hit singles in the early 1970s, he relocated to England in 1975, and spent several years in Belgium, settling in Amsterdam (Netherlands) in spring 1977. At the beginning of 1980 he had some major performances as Lee Roberts and the Sweaters in the Ganzenhoef, Paradiso, De Melkweg and the Concertgebouw, and was successful. At the end of 1980 he moved to the Dutch town of Ruurlo, legally changing his name to Lee Roberts—his middle name and his mother's maiden name. He promoted new music via his Art-Con Productions company. Among the bands he promoted was the heavy metal band, Shockwave, from The Hague. A live performance on January 8, 1980, featuring Lee Roberts & the Sweaters, was released as an album entitled Soulin in 1988.

== Personal life ==
Conley was gay, and several music writers have said that his homosexuality was a bar to greater success in the United States, and one of the reasons behind his move to Europe and his eventual name change. In 2014, rock historian Ed Ward wrote, "[Conley] headed to Amsterdam and changed his name to Lee Roberts. Nobody knew 'Lee Roberts,' and at last Conley was able to live in peace with a secret he had hidden—or thought he had—for his entire career: he was gay. But nobody in The Netherlands cared".

== Death ==
Conley died at the age of 57 from intestinal cancer in Ruurlo, Netherlands in November 2003. He was buried in Vorden.

== Discography ==
=== Albums ===
Conley released the following albums:

Year	Title	Peak chart positions	
Year	Title	US 200	US CB
1967	Sweet Soul Music	93	65
1967	Soul Directions	193	—
1968	Shake, Rattle & Roll	185	—
1969	More Sweet Soul	—	—

=== Singles ===
Year	Titles (A-side, B-side)	Peak chart positions				
Year	Titles (A-side, B-side)	US	US R&B	CB	UK	CA
1963	"I Believe" (as Arthur & the Corvets)	—	—	—	—	—
1963	"Flossie Mae" (as Arthur & the Corvets)	—	—	—	—	—
1963	"Poor Girl" (as Arthur & the Corvets)	—	—	—	—	—
1965	"Where He Leads Me" b/w "I'm A Lonely Stranger"	—	—	—	—	—
1966	"Who's Fooling Who" b/w "There's A Place For Us"	—	—	—	—	—
1966	"I Can't Stop (No, No, No)" b/w "In The Same Old Way"	—	—	—	—	—
1966	"I'm Gonna Forget About You" b/w "Take Me (Just As I Am)"	—	—	—	—	—
1967	"Sweet Soul Music" b/w "Let's Go Steady"	2	2	4	7	5
1967	"Shake, Rattle & Roll" b/w "You Don't Have To See Me"	31	20	47	—	39
1967	"Whole Lotta Woman" b/w "Love Comes And Goe"	73	—	92	—	76
1967	"Ha! Ha! Ha! Ha!" b/w "Keep On Talking"	—	—	—	—	—
1968	"Funky Street" b/w "Put Our Love Together"	14	5	19	46	18
1968	"Aunt Dora's Love Soul Shack" b/w "Is That You Love"	85	41	75	—	—
1968	"People Sure Act Funny" b/w "Burning Fire"	58	17	41	—	39
1968	"Ob-La-Di, Ob-La-Da" b/w "Otis Sleep On"	51	41	74	—	50
1969	"Star Review" b/w "Is That You Love" (with Tom Dowd)	—	—	—	—	—
1969	"They Call the Wind Maria" b/w "Hurt"	—	—	—	—	—
1969	"Run On" b/w "Speak Her Name"	115	—	—	—	—
1969	"Day-O" b/w "Nobody's Fault But Mine"	—	—	—	—	—
1970	"God Bless" b/w "(Your Love Has Brought Me) A Mighty Long Way"	107	33	91	—	84
1970	"All Day Singing" (Note: Single not released in the US) b/w "God Bless"	—	—	—	—	—
1971	"I'm Living Good" b/w "I'm So Glad You're Here"	—	—	—	—	—
1972	"Rita" b/w "More Sweet Soul Music"	—	—	—	—	—
1972	"Walking on Eggs" b/w "More Sweet Soul Music"	—	—	—	—	—
1974	"It's So Nice (When It's Someone Else's Wife)" b/w "Bless You"	—	—	—	—	—
1976	"I Got You Babe" b/w "Another Time"	—	—	—	—	—
