= Sweet Soul Music =

Single by Arthur Conley

from the album Sweet Soul Music
- B-side: "Let's Go Steady"
- Released: March 1967
- Recorded: January 1967
- Studio: FAME, Muscle Shoals, Alabama
- Genre: R&B; soul
- Length: 2:20
- Label: Atco
- Songwriters: Sam Cooke, Arthur Conley and Otis Redding

Arthur Conley singles chronology
"I'm Gonna Forget About You" (1966)	"Sweet Soul Music" (1967)	"Shake, Rattle & Roll" (1967)

"Sweet Soul Music" is a soul song first released by the American singer Arthur Conley in March 1967. Written by Conley and Otis Redding, it is based on the Sam Cooke song "Yeah Man" from his posthumous album Shake; the opening riff is a quote from Elmer Bernstein's score for the 1960 movie The Magnificent Seven.

== Overview ==
In the US, "Sweet Soul Music" reached the No. 2 spot on the Billboard Hot 100 (behind "The Happening" by The Supremes), and No. 2 on the Billboard R&B chart. Overseas, it peaked at No. 7 on the UK Singles Chart. "Sweet Soul Music" sold over one million copies, and was awarded a gold disc.

J.W. Alexander, Cooke's business partner, sued both Redding and Conley for appropriating the melody. A settlement was reached in which Cooke's name was added to the writer credits, and Redding agreed to record some songs in the future from Kags Music, a Cooke–Alexander enterprise.

== Lyrics ==
The song is an homage to soul music. The following songs are mentioned in the lyrics:

- "Going to a Go-Go", by the Miracles; the group is not explicitly mentioned.
- "Love Is a Hurtin' Thing", by Lou Rawls
- "Hold On, I'm Comin'", by Sam & Dave
- "Mustang Sally", by Wilson Pickett
- "Fa-Fa-Fa-Fa-Fa (Sad Song)", by Otis Redding. A brief instrumental version of the chorus for the song is quoted, after Conley says, "Hit it, Otis".

Additionally, James Brown is described as "the king of them all".

At the end of the song, Arthur Conley sings, "Otis Redding got the feeling."

== Certifications ==
Region	Certification	Certified units/sales
United Kingdom (BPI)	Silver	200,000^{‡}
^{‡} Sales+streaming figures based on certification alone.
