= Meiert Avis =

Irish film and music video director

- Born: Meiert Avis
- Occupations: Film director; music video director; television commercial director
- Years active: 1980–present
- Website: pushermedia.com

Meiert Avis is an Irish music video and commercial director.

== Career ==
Meiert Avis has directed videos for artists such as Bob Dylan, Bruce Springsteen, U2, Take That, Avril Lavigne, Paramore, Alanis Morissette, Flyleaf, Jennifer Lopez, New Found Glory, Josh Groban, and Ariana Grande.

His commercial clients include Toyota, Pioneer, Lexus, and The Los Angeles Times.

== Awards ==
Avis's awards and nominations include a Grammy Award for U2's "Where The Streets Have No Name" and MTV Music Video Awards for U2's "With or Without You" and Ryuichi Sakamoto and Iggy Pop's "Risky".

His work has received international recognition, most notably the Grand Clio and the Cannes Gold Lion.

== Filmography ==
=== Music videos ===
- The Ward Brothers - "Cross That Bridge (song)" (1984)
- U2 – "I Will Follow" (1980)
- U2 – "Gloria" (1981)
- U2 – "A Celebration" (1982)
- U2 – "New Year's Day" (1983)
- U2 – "Two Hearts Beat as One" (1983)
- U2 – "The Unforgettable Fire" (1984)
- In Tua Nua – "Somebody To Love" (1984)
- The Waterboys – "The Whole of the Moon" (1985)
- Killing Joke – "Kings and Queens" (1985)
- Thompson Twins – "Don't Mess with Doctor Dream" (1985) (with directors Godley & Creme)
- Thompson Twins – "Lay Your Hands on Me" (1985)
- Thompson Twins – "King for a Day" (1985)
- Thompson Twins – "Revolution" (1985)
- Thompson Twins – "Nothing in Common" (1985)
- Thompson Twins – "Long Goodbye" (1987)
- Clannad featuring Bono – "In a Lifetime" (1985)
- Jackson Browne – "Lives in the Balance" (1986)
- Cactus World News – "Worlds Apart" (1986)
- John Parr – "Blame It on the Radio" (1986)
- John Farnham - "You're the Voice" (1987)
- Ryuichi Sakamoto featuring Iggy Pop – "Risky" (1987)
- Bruce Springsteen – "Brilliant Disguise" (1987)
- U2 – "With or Without You" (1987)
- U2 – "Where the Streets Have No Name" (1987)
- Marc Jordan – "This Independence" (1987)
- Bruce Springsteen – "Tunnel of Love" (1988)
- Bruce Springsteen – "One Step Up" (1988)
- Bruce Springsteen – "Tougher Than the Rest" (1988)
- Marc Jordan – "Catch the Moon" (1988)
- Steve Earle – "Back to the Wall" (1988)
- Patti Smith – "People Have the Power" (1988)
- Herbie Hancock – "Keep the Vibe Alive" (1988)
- Bruce Springsteen – "Born to Run" (Version 2: Acoustic) (1988)
- Terence Trent D'Arby - "To Know Someone Deeply Is to Know Someone Softly" (1989)
- U2 – "All I Want Is You" (1989)
- Bette Midler – "Night and Day" (1990)
- David Baerwald – "Dance" (1990)
- Brent Bourgeois – "Can't Feel the Pain" (1990)
- Warrant – "Uncle Tom's Cabin" (1990)
- Hothouse Flowers – "Give It Up" (1990)
- Jeff Lynne – "Every Little Thing" (1990)
- Jeff Lynne – "Lift Me Up" (1990)
- Chris Whitley – "Dust Radio" (1991) – released 2007 on YouTube after Chris died
- Van Halen – "Top of the World" (Super8) (1991)
- Van Halen – "Runaround" (1991)
- The Psychedelic Furs – "Until She Comes" (1991)
- Chris Whitley – "Big Sky Country" (1991)
- Van Halen – "Top of the World" (Version 1) (1991)
- Bob Dylan – "Series of Dreams" (1991)
- Scorpions – "Send Me an Angel" (1991)
- Bruce Springsteen – "Better Days" (1992)
- Bruce Springsteen – "Human Touch" (1992)
- Warrant – "Machine Gun" (1993)
- Patti Scialfa – "As Long as I (Can Be With You)" (1993)
- Patti Scialfa – "Lucky Girl" (1994)
- Bonnie Raitt – "Love Sneakin' Up On You" (1994)
- Indigo Girls – "Touch Me Fall" (1994)
- Bonnie Raitt – "Blue for No Reason" (1998)
- The Calling – "Could It Be Any Harder" (2001)
- Audioslave – "Like a Stone" (2002)
- Michelle Branch – "Are You Happy Now?" (2003)
- The All-American Rejects – "Time Stands Still" (2003)
- Matchbox Twenty – "Unwell" (2003)
- Jennifer Lopez – "Baby I Love U!" (2003)
- The Calling – "For You" (2003)
- Elvis Presley – "Rubberneckin' (Paul Oakenfold Remix)" (2003)
- Truman – "Girl With a Pearl" (2003)
- Truman – "Morning Light" (2003)
- Trapt – "Echo" (2003)
- Something Corporate – "Me and the Moon" (2003)
- Josh Groban – "You Raise Me Up" (2003)
- Josh Groban – "Per Te"
- Josh Groban – "Confession"
- Josh Groban – "Remember When It Rained" (2004)
- Avril Lavigne – "My Happy Ending" (2004)
- Alanis Morissette – "Everything" (2004)
- New Found Glory – "All Downhill from Here" (2004) (co-directed with No Brain)
- New Found Glory – "Failure's Not Flattering" (2004)
- New Found Glory – "This Disaster" (2004)
- Counting Crows – "Accidentally in Love" (for Shrek 2) (2004)
- Seal – "Walk On By" (2004)
- Damien Rice – "Delicate" (2004)
- Peter Cincotti – "Saint Louis Blues" (2004)
- Bonnie McKee – "Somebody" (2004)
- Damien Rice – "The Blower's Daughter" – for Mike Nichols' Closer (2004)
- Alanis Morissette – "Crazy" (2005)
- Darren Hayes – "So Beautiful" (2005)
- HIM – "Wings of a Butterfly" (2005)
- Stewie/Family Guy – "Sexy Party" (2005)
- Gavin DeGraw – "We Belong Together" (2006)
- Zucchero – "Bacco Per Bacco" (2006)
- Zucchero – "Cuba Libre" (2006)
- Josh Groban – "You Are Loved (Don't Give Up)" (2006)
- Seether – "The Gift" (2006)
- P.O.D. – "Goodbye for Now" (2006)
- HIM – "The Kiss of Dawn" (2007)
- Papa Roach – "Forever" (2007)
- Jack's Mannequin and Mick Fleetwood – "God" (2007)
- Jibbs Featuring Melody Thornton – "Go Too Far" (2007)
- Macy Gray – "Finally Made Me Happy" (2007)
- HIM – "Bleed Well" (2007)
- HIM – "Digital Versatile Doom" (Live) (2008)
- Bryn Christopher – "The Quest" (2008)
- Take That – "Greatest Day" (2008)
- Chris Cornell – "Ground Zero" (2008)
- Mixi – "I Miss Those Days (Ghost)" (2008)
- New Kids on the Block – "2 in the Morning" (2009)
- New Found Glory – "Listen to Your Friends" (2009)
- Rise Against – "Hero of War" (2009)
- Flyleaf – "Again" (2009)
- New Found Glory – "Don't Let Her Pull You Down" (2009)
- Paramore – "Brick by Boring Brick" (2009)
- Boys Like Girls featuring Taylor Swift – "Two Is Better Than One" (2009)
- The Pretty Reckless – "Make Me Wanna Die" (2010)
- The Pretty Reckless – "Miss Nothing" (2010)
- The Pretty Reckless – "Just Tonight" (2010)
- Crystal Bowersox – "Farmer's Daughter" (2010)
- Evanescence – "What You Want" (2011)
- Bush – "The Sound of Winter" (2011)
- The Pretty Reckless - "You" (2012)
- The Pretty Reckless - "My Medicine" (2012)

* undated work is not chronological

=== Commercials ===
- Lexus – Tach
- Toyota – Tank of Gas
- THQ – THQ
- Yamaha – Amen
- Pioneer – Bridge
- Adidas – Runner
- ESPN – Three Act Play
- ESPN – Gameday
- Edwin – Rooftop
- KeyCorp – Line
- SeaWorld – Lost at Sea
- Toyota – Echo Chamber
- Toyota – Reflection
- Toyota – Reverb
- Sergio Tacchini – Tennis
- Universal – Street
- Atlantis Resorts – Cycle of H2O
- Coca-Cola – Orchestra
- Dr Scholl's – Nurse
- Pontiac – Scream

* undated work is not chronological

=== Films ===
- Far from Home (1989)
- Undiscovered (2005)
