= Bruce Springsteen 1992–1993 World Tour =

Bruce Springsteen World Tour 1992–1993
- Tour by Bruce Springsteen
- Associated album: Human Touch; Lucky Town
- Start date: June 15, 1992
- End date: June 26, 1993
- Legs: 3
- No. of shows: 107

Bruce Springsteen concert chronology
- Human Rights Now! (1988); Bruce Springsteen 1992–1993 World Tour (1992–93); Ghost of Tom Joad Tour (1995–97)

The Bruce Springsteen 1992–1993 World Tour was a concert tour featuring the American singer-songwriter Bruce Springsteen with a new backing band, that took place from mid-1992 to mid-1993. It followed the simultaneous release of his albums Human Touch and Lucky Town earlier in 1992. It was his first of four non-E Street Band tours, later followed by the Ghost of Tom Joad Tour (1995–97), the Devils & Dust Tour (2005), and the Seeger Sessions Tour (2006). The tour was not as commercially or critically successful as past tours, due to poor reception of Human Touch and Lucky Town as well as changes from previous tours. According to Springsteen biographer Dave Marsh, die-hard fans have informally referred to the backing band as "the Other Band" (and the tour as "The Other Band Tour").

== Itinerary ==
The tour was preceded by a June 5, 1992, U.S. "dress rehearsal" radio broadcast of the new band. Springsteen said, "I missed playing. I missed getting out. I missed the fans. I've been home a while. I've worked hard on the records." The tour's first leg was conducted in arenas in Western Europe, opening on June 15, 1992, at the Globen in Stockholm. Springsteen said, "It's nice to start the tour here. It's nice to be back among people who have always been hospitable." After 15 dates there, including five at London's Wembley Arena, the tour came home to the United States.

There, the second leg began in late July with a then-record 11 consecutive dates in New Jersey's Meadowlands Arena. It continued in arenas through the U.S. and Canada, for a total of 61 shows through mid-December.

Springsteen then took a three-month winter break, before starting up again in late March for the third leg, a longer stint in Western Europe that played 31 dates there, some in outdoor stadiums. The tour proper ended on June 1, 1993, in Oslo's Valle Hovin. Grossing US$78 million.

== The 1992–1993 Tour backing band ==
Springsteen had dissolved his long-time backing E Street Band in 1989, and had not used them on Human Touch and Lucky Town. This tour was his first time out with another group. Looking for a somewhat different sound, he assembled an outfit that gave him both more guitar-based arrangements and a more R&B-based feel with more backup singers; gone were the organ and saxophone key elements of the traditional E Street sound.

Keyboardist Roy Bittan was the only E Street Band member retained. Most of the rest of the touring band were experienced session musicians who were not well known to the general music audience. Better-known ace session drummer Jeff Porcaro, who had played on Human Touch, was supposedly offered $1 million to join the tour, but instead stayed with his band Toto.

Springsteen's new wife and previous E Street backup singer Patti Scialfa was not a regular member of this band, but made guest appearances at many shows to duet with Springsteen on some combination of "Brilliant Disguise", "Tougher Than the Rest", and "Human Touch".

== The show ==
Shows typically began with several selections from the new albums—typically the self-described happy songs "Better Days", "Local Hero", and "Lucky Town"—and emphasized the new material throughout. Slots for older songs were mostly given to numbers from his massively selling 1984 Born in the U.S.A. album.

Highlights from the new material included Springsteen crowd surfing during "Leap of Faith"; nature imagery motifs running through the show and culminating with frequent show closer "My Beautiful Reward"; a distortion-fest on "57 Channels (And Nothin' On)", one of several numbers where the band's sound verged on heavy metal; and the emotional peak of "Living Proof" with its U2-styled synthesizer settings.

The main set closer continued to be "Light of Day", a role that it had assumed in the Tunnel of Love Express Tour and here was elongated with an "I'm just a prisoner ... of rock and roll!" rap, while the band introductions song was "Glory Days" in the encores.

Springsteen 1970s classics that were heavily identified with the E Street Band sound were finessed either by rearranging them ("Thunder Road" was recast on acoustic guitar) or avoiding them (gone were the epics "Backstreets", "Jungleland", and "Racing in the Street"). Springsteen's biggest hit single, 1984's "Dancing in the Dark", was stripped down to near-solo electric guitar and given a tired, weary reading, before being dropped from the set lists altogether.

== Commercial and critical reaction ==
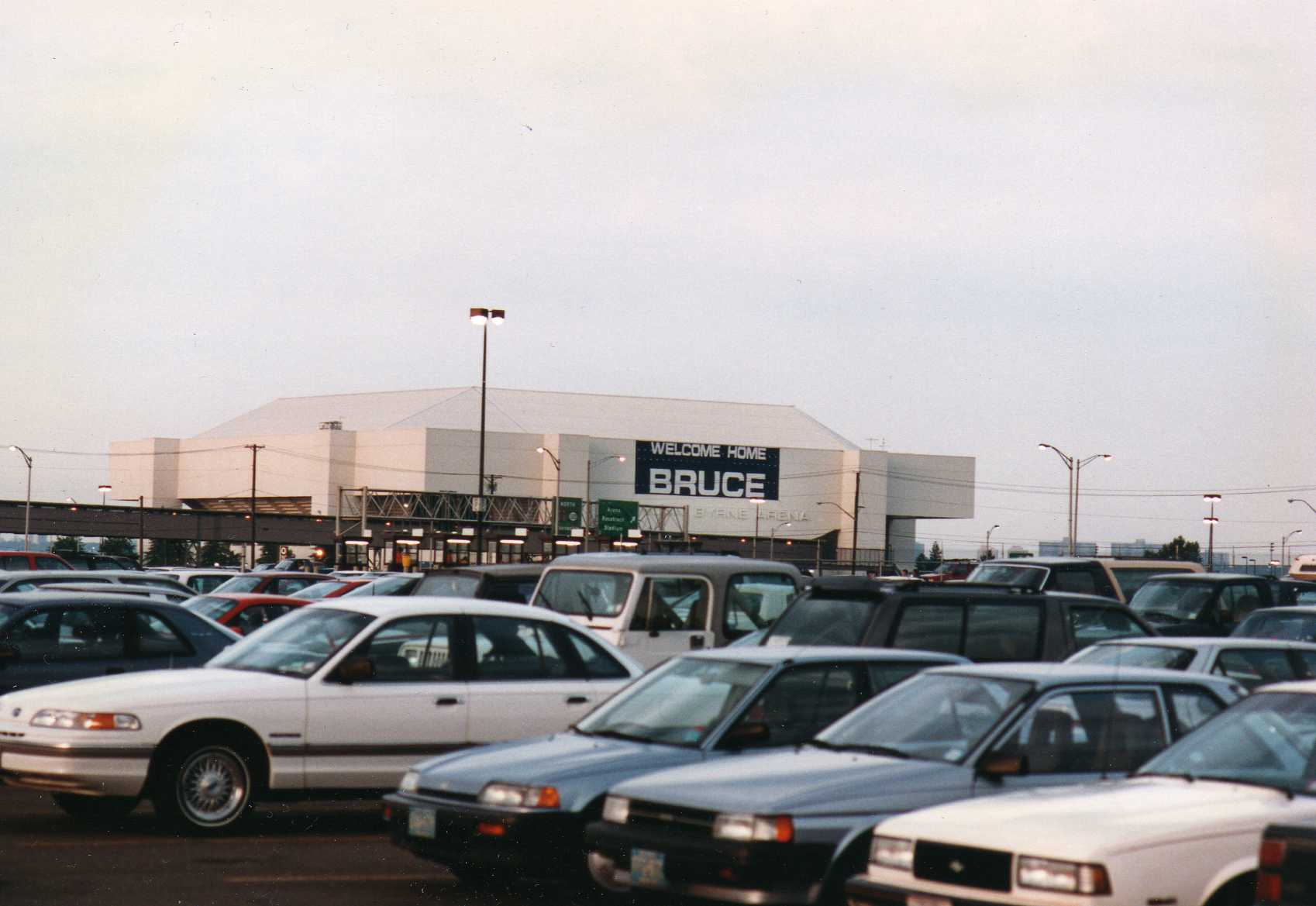
Meadowlands Arena officials placed a large sign on their structure for the opening of the North American leg of the tour. July–August 1992.

The tour played a large number of dates and sold many tickets. The eleven-show stint in the Meadowlands surpassed his 10-show run there in the first leg of the Born in the U.S.A. Tour, but ticket demand was much higher then; here, the shows were not actually sold out at start time. Ticket sales were strong along the Eastern Seaboard, but weaker in areas such as Cleveland and Detroit, a reflection of the two albums' lackluster sales performance and failure to generate much in the way of hit singles.

Critical reception of the tour was varied. Lars Lindström reviewed the opening Stockholm show for Back Beat and said, "the musicians have not yet become a band – and they lack the moments of total togetherness both musically and physically. Only singer and percussionist Crystal Taliefero [...] and singer Bobby King have the undisputed charisma." USA Today music writer Edna Gundersen thought very highly of the opening New Jersey show, saying that "for those doubting that such [domestic bliss and] inner contentment can co-exist with rebellious rock passion, Springsteen offers living proof: an emotionally resonating, downright rowdy 27-song rock 'n' roll shindig." She also said that the new band was "a cohesive force worthy of succeeding the crack E Street Band", and also called out Taliefero for praise. The New York Times's Jon Pareles, reviewing the same show, also commented about the show's themes of "the healing power and everyday complications of love", and said that "Mr. King brings a falsetto gospel to songs with a touch of 1960's soul music, while Ms. Taliefero is a sassy female foil." Matty Karas of the Asbury Park Press wrote that "The whole show seemed something of a monologue on what he's been up to: getting divorced, getting remarried, having children, changing bands, sorting out a rocky life, falling off the pop charts, realizing there are more important things in life than rock 'n' roll and realizing you need to rock 'n' roll anyway. Mirroring his real life, it was as directly autobiographical a show as he's ever performed."

Fan response fell roughly into three categories:

1. Those who welcomed the new sound and thought highly of the shows
2. Those who were open to a new sound but did not think that this particular band hit the mark
3. Those who were aghast at the very notion of departing from the E Street sound.

It is impossible to measure the relative proportion of these; among the Springsteen faithful, the most common verdict over time has been that they enjoyed the shows while they were there, but have not felt cause to revisit them (via bootleg or official recordings) since. However, Springsteen biographer Dave Marsh later wrote that the Springsteen hard-core fan base had rejected the tour because "its sound was somewhat blacker." Whatever the cause, certain new numbers such as "Big Muddy" and "If I Should Fall Behind" were completely ineffective in the United States, eliciting an exodus to the beer and bathroom lines and minimal applause afterward.

Several specific developments did annoy fans. One was the general discovery that Springsteen was using a Teleprompter to remember his words. It soon became clear that he was dependent upon the device, as for on long lyrics such as "Thunder Road" he would check the screen a good eight or nine times. A similar discovery was made by those seated behind the stage, that drummer Zachary Alford was using a red-LED metronome to keep proper time. Finally was the unexpected outcome of the band's MTV Unplugged appearance, where Springsteen lost confidence in the band and, after one acoustic song, did the rest of the concert in normal electric mode, thus violating the show's fundamental premise. This did result in the In Concert/MTV Plugged album release, which documents what the 1992–1993 Tour band sounded like.

In the end, the fact that this was still a rock band, with a still conventional instrumental line-up, meant that it would be directly compared with the E Street Band and thus find it hard to establish a significant identity of its own. Over a decade later, Springsteen would solve this problem in his next non-E Street Band, non-solo tour, the Sessions Band Tour, where the makeup of the band and of their sound was utterly different from anything before and thus impossible to compare.

== Broadcasts and recordings ==
As previously mentioned, a national radio rehearsal show and the abortive MTV Plugged show, the latter of which as In Concert/MTV Plugged was released in audio on CD and in video on VHS, Laserdisc, and later DVD formats.

Several shows have been released as part of the Bruce Springsteen Archives:

- Brendan Byrne Arena, New Jersey June 24, 1993, released on January 5, 2018
- Meadowlands, July 25, 1992, released on May 3, 2019
- Boston December 13, 1992, released on May 7, 2021
- ‘’Berlin May 14, 1993’’, released on April 1, 2022
- Meadowlands, July 31, 1992, released on November 12, 2026

== Tour dates ==
Date	City	Country	Venue	Attendance	Revenue
Europe
June 15, 1992	Stockholm	Sweden	Globe Arena	15,500 / 15,500	
June 17, 1992	Stockholm	Sweden	Globe Arena	16,337 / 16,337	
June 20, 1992	Milan	Italy	Forum di Assago		
June 21, 1992	Milan	Italy	Forum di Assago		
June 25, 1992	Frankfurt	Germany	Festhalle Frankfurt		
June 26, 1992	Frankfurt	Germany	Festhalle Frankfurt		
June 29, 1992	Paris	France	Palais Omnisports de Paris-Bercy		
June 30, 1992	Paris	France	Palais Omnisports de Paris-Bercy		
July 3, 1992	Barcelona	Spain	Plaza Monumental de Barcelona		
July 4, 1992 (Note: The concert on July 4, 1992, in Barcelona, was originally scheduled on July 2, 1992, before being postponed due to transport strikes in France.)	Barcelona	Spain	Plaza Monumental de Barcelona		
July 6, 1992	London	England	Wembley Arena		
July 9, 1992	London	England	Wembley Arena		
July 10, 1992	London	England	Wembley Arena		
July 12, 1992	London	England	Wembley Arena		
July 13, 1992	London	England	Wembley Arena		
North America
July 23, 1992	East Rutherford	United States	Brendan Byrne Arena	220,902 / 220,902	$6,295,707
July 25, 1992	East Rutherford	United States	Brendan Byrne Arena	220,902 / 220,902	$6,295,707
July 26, 1992	East Rutherford	United States	Brendan Byrne Arena	220,902 / 220,902	$6,295,707
July 28, 1992	East Rutherford	United States	Brendan Byrne Arena	220,902 / 220,902	$6,295,707
July 30, 1992	East Rutherford	United States	Brendan Byrne Arena	220,902 / 220,902	$6,295,707
July 31, 1992	East Rutherford	United States	Brendan Byrne Arena	220,902 / 220,902	$6,295,707
August 2, 1992	East Rutherford	United States	Brendan Byrne Arena	220,902 / 220,902	$6,295,707
August 4, 1992	East Rutherford	United States	Brendan Byrne Arena	220,902 / 220,902	$6,295,707
August 6, 1992	East Rutherford	United States	Brendan Byrne Arena	220,902 / 220,902	$6,295,707
August 7, 1992	East Rutherford	United States	Brendan Byrne Arena	220,902 / 220,902	$6,295,707
August 10, 1992	East Rutherford	United States	Brendan Byrne Arena	220,902 / 220,902	$6,295,707
August 13, 1992	Worcester	United States	The Centrum	28,531 / 28,531	$813,134
August 14, 1992	Worcester	United States	The Centrum	28,531 / 28,531	$813,134
August 17, 1992	Auburn Hills	United States	The Palace of Auburn Hills		
August 18, 1992	Auburn Hills	United States	The Palace of Auburn Hills		
August 21, 1992	Richfield	United States	Richfield Coliseum		
August 22, 1992	Richfield	United States	Richfield Coliseum		
August 25, 1992	Landover	United States	Capital Centre	36,563 / 36,563	$1,042,046
August 26, 1992	Landover	United States	Capital Centre	36,563 / 36,563	$1,042,046
August 28, 1992	Philadelphia	United States	The Spectrum	37,402 / 37,402	$1,065,958
August 29, 1992	Philadelphia	United States	The Spectrum	37,402 / 37,402	$1,065,958
September 2, 1992	Tinley Park	United States	World Music Theatre		
September 3, 1992	Tinley Park	United States	World Music Theatre		
September 24, 1992	Los Angeles	United States	Los Angeles Memorial Sports Arena	48,547 / 48,547	$1,383,590
September 25, 1992	Los Angeles	United States	Los Angeles Memorial Sports Arena	48,547 / 48,547	$1,383,590
September 28, 1992	Los Angeles	United States	Los Angeles Memorial Sports Arena	48,547 / 48,547	$1,383,590
September 29, 1992	San Diego	United States	San Diego Sports Arena	11,138 / 14,336	$328,571
October 2, 1992	Phoenix	United States	America West Arena	29,555 / 33,050	$711,813
October 3, 1992	Phoenix	United States	America West Arena	29,555 / 33,050	$711,813
October 6, 1992	Sacramento	United States	ARCO Arena		
October 13, 1992	Tacoma	United States	Tacoma Dome		
October 15, 1992	Vancouver	Canada	Pacific Coliseum		
October 17, 1992	Calgary	Canada	Olympic Saddledome	15,976 / 16,972	$408,439
October 18, 1992	Edmonton	Canada	Northlands Coliseum		
October 21, 1992 (Note: The concerts on October 21 and 22, 1992, in Mountain View, were originally scheduled on October 8 and 9, 1992, respectively, before being postponed due to illness.)	Mountain View	United States	Shoreline Amphitheatre	40,000 / 40,000	$1,008,000
October 22, 1992	Mountain View	United States	Shoreline Amphitheatre	40,000 / 40,000	$1,008,000
October 26, 1992	Denver	United States	McNichols Sports Arena		
October 30, 1992	Ames	United States	Hilton Coliseum		
October 31, 1992	Minneapolis	United States	Target Center	17,903 / 17,903	$447,575
November 3, 1992	Milwaukee	United States	Bradley Center	17,720 / 17,720	$443,000
November 5, 1992	Toronto	Canada	SkyDome	48,781 / 48,781	$1,300,361
November 6, 1992	Toronto	Canada	SkyDome	48,781 / 48,781	$1,300,361
November 9, 1992	Uniondale	United States	Nassau Veterans Memorial Coliseum	33,940 / 36,000	$967,290
November 10, 1992	Uniondale	United States	Nassau Veterans Memorial Coliseum	33,940 / 36,000	$967,290
November 13, 1992	Syracuse	United States	Carrier Dome	29,411 / 32,000	$735,275
November 15, 1992	Hartford	United States	Hartford Civic Center	15,673 / 15,673	$446,681
November 17, 1992	Chapel Hill	United States	Dean E. Smith Student Activities Center		
November 18, 1992	Charlotte	United States	Charlotte Coliseum		
November 23, 1992	Orlando	United States	Orlando Arena	14,822 / 14,822	$370,550
November 24, 1992	Miami	United States	Miami Arena	15,739 / 15,739	$393,475
November 30, 1992	Atlanta	United States	The Omni		
December 2, 1992	Dallas	United States	Reunion Arena	15,756 / 17,000	$385,329
December 3, 1992 (Note: The concert on December 3, 1992, in St. Louis, was originally scheduled on October 28, 1992, before being postponed due to sore throat.)	St. Louis	United States	St. Louis Arena	12,415 / 19,184	$282,325
December 5, 1992	Indianapolis	United States	Market Square Arena	14,000 / 17,000	
December 7, 1992	Philadelphia	United States	The Spectrum	36,119 / 36,119	$1,029,392
December 8, 1992	Philadelphia	United States	The Spectrum	36,119 / 36,119	$1,029,392
December 13, 1992	Boston	United States	Boston Garden	28,841 / 28,841	$821,969
December 14, 1992	Boston	United States	Boston Garden	28,841 / 28,841	$821,969
December 16, 1992 (Note: The concert on December 16, 1992, in Pittsburgh, was originally scheduled on December 11, 1992, before being postponed due to bad weather.)	Pittsburgh	United States	Civic Arena	15,710 / 15,710	$392,750
December 17, 1992 (Note: The concert on December 17, 1992, in Lexington, was originally scheduled on November 21, 1992, before being postponed due to illness.)	Lexington	United States	Rupp Arena	13,000 / 23,000	
Europe
March 31, 1993	Glasgow	Scotland	Scottish Exhibition and Conference Centre		
April 3, 1993	Dortmund	Germany	Westfalenhallen		
April 4, 1993	Dortmund	Germany	Westfalenhallen		
April 7, 1993	Zürich	Switzerland	Hallenstadion		
April 8, 1993	Zürich	Switzerland	Hallenstadion		
April 11, 1993	Verona	Italy	Stadio Marcantonio Bentegodi		
April 13, 1993	Lyon	France	Halle Tony Garnier		
April 15, 1993	Sheffield	England	Sheffield Arena	23,650 / 23,650	$734,108
April 16, 1993	Sheffield	England	Sheffield Arena	23,650 / 23,650	$734,108
April 19, 1993	Rotterdam	Netherlands	Rotterdam Ahoy Sportpaleis		
April 20, 1993	Rotterdam	Netherlands	Rotterdam Ahoy Sportpaleis		
April 23, 1993	Ghent	Belgium	Flanders Expo		
April 24, 1993	Ghent	Belgium	Flanders Expo		
May 1, 1993	Lisbon	Portugal	Estádio José Alvalade	60 000 / 65 000	
May 5, 1993	Madrid	Spain	Vicente Calderón Stadium		
May 7, 1993	Gijón	Spain	Estadio Municipal El Molinón		
May 9, 1993	Santiago de Compostela	Spain	Auditorio Monte do Gozo		
May 11, 1993	Barcelona	Spain	Estadi Olímpic de Montjuïc		
May 14, 1993	Berlin	Germany	Waldbühne		
May 16, 1993	Munich	Germany	Alter Flughafen Riem		
May 17, 1993	Mannheim	Germany	Maimarkthalle		
May 20, 1993	Dublin	Ireland	RDS Arena	40 000 / 40 000	
May 22, 1993	Milton Keynes	England	National Bowl	59 000 / 65 000	
May 25, 1993	Rome	Italy	Stadio Flaminio		
May 28, 1993	Stockholm	Sweden	Stockholm Olympic Stadium	32 000 / 32 000	
May 30, 1993	Gentofte	Denmark	Gentofte Sportspark		
June 1, 1993	Oslo	Norway	Valle Hovin		
North America
June 24, 1993	East Rutherford	United States	Brendan Byrne Arena		
June 26, 1993	New York City	United States	Madison Square Garden		

== Songs performed ==
Originals

Greetings from Asbury Park, New Jersey

- "For You"
- "Growin' Up"
- "Spirit in the Night"

The Wild, the Innocent & the E Street Shuffle

- "4th of July, Asbury Park (Sandy)"
- "Rosalita (Come Out Tonight)"

Born to Run

- "Born to Run"
- "Thunder Road"

Darkness on the Edge of Town

- "Badlands"
- "Darkness on the Edge of Town"
- "The Promised Land"
- "Prove It All Night"
- "Racing in the Street"

The River

- "Hungry Heart"
- "The River"
- "Sherry Darling"

Nebraska

- "Atlantic City"
- "Open All Night"

Born in the U.S.A.

- "Bobby Jean"
- "Born in the U.S.A."
- "Cover Me"
- "Dancing in the Dark"
- "Darlington County"
- "Downbound Train"
- "Glory Days"
- "I'm on Fire"
- "My Hometown"
- "Working on the Highway"

Tunnel of Love

- "Brilliant Disguise"
- "Tougher Than the Rest"

Human Touch

- "57 Channels (And Nothin' On)"
- "All or Nothin' at All"
- "Cross My Heart"
- "Gloria's Eyes"
- "Human Touch"
- "I Wish I Were Blind"
- "The Long Goodbye"
- "Man's Job"
- "Pony Boy"
- "Real Man"
- "Real World"
- "Roll of the Dice"
- "Soul Driver"
- "With Every Wish"

Lucky Town

- "Better Days"
- "The Big Muddy"
- "Book of Dreams"
- "If I Should Fall Behind"
- "Leap of Faith"
- "Living Proof"
- "Local Hero"
- "Lucky Town"
- "My Beautiful Reward"
- "Souls of the Departed"

Other

- "All the Way Home"
- "Because the Night"
- "Follow That Dream"
- "Light of Day"
- "Part Man, Part Monkey"
- "Red Headed Woman"

Cover songs

- "99 1/2 Won't Do"
- "Across the Borderline"
- "In the Midnight Hour"
- "Jersey Girl"
- "Many Rivers to Cross"
- "Ramblin' Gamblin' Man"
- "Rock Ballad"
- "Santa Claus is Comin' to Town"
- "The Star-Spangled Banner"
- "Toccata and Fugue in D minor"
- "Trapped"
- "Viva Las Vegas"
- "Who'll Stop the Rain"

Soundchecked/on setlist but not performed

- "Backstreets"
- "Bad Moon Rising"
- "Can't Help Falling in Love"
- "Chimes of Freedom"
- "Club Soul City"
- "Hey Tonight"
- "I Ain't Got No Home"
- "Let the Good Times Roll"
- "Mansion on the Hill"
- "It's All Right"
- "Let it Bleed"
- "People Get Ready"
- "Stand on It"
- "Twist and Shout"
- "When You Walk in the Room"

=== Notes ===
- During the April 3, 1993 concert in Dortmund, Jon Bon Jovi and Richie Sambora joined Springsteen to perform "Glory Days."

== Band members ==
- Bruce Springsteen – lead vocals, guitar & harmonica
- Shane Fontayne – guitar
- Tommy Sims – bass
- Zachary Alford – drums
- Roy Bittan – keyboards
- Crystal Taliefero – guitar, percussion & background vocals, saxophone on "Born to Run"
- Bobby King – background vocals
- Gia Ciambotti – background vocals
- Carol Dennis – background vocals
- Cleopatra Kennedy – background vocals
- Angel Rogers – background vocals
- Patti Scialfa – guest appearances for guitar & harmony vocals on "Brilliant Disguise", "Tougher Than The Rest", and "Human Touch"

== Sources ==
- Killing Floor's concert database supplies the itinerary and set lists for the shows, but unfortunately does not support direct linking to individual dates.
- Brucebase the same, with ticket and promotional images as well.
