= Greatest Hits (Bruce Springsteen album) =

Greatest hits album by Bruce Springsteen
- Released: February 27, 1995
- Recorded: 1974–1995
- Genre: Rock
- Length: 76:35
- Label: Columbia
- Producers: Bruce Springsteen; Mike Appel; Jon Landau; Steven Van Zandt; Chuck Plotkin; Roy Bittan

Bruce Springsteen chronology
In Concert/MTV Plugged (1993)	Greatest Hits (1995)	The Ghost of Tom Joad (1995)

Bruce Springsteen and the E Street Band chronology
Chimes of Freedom (1988)	Greatest Hits (1995)	Blood Brothers (1996)

Singles from Greatest Hits
- 1. "Murder Incorporated" Released: February 24, 1995 (EU); 2. "Secret Garden" Released: April 11, 1995; 3. "Hungry Heart '95" Released: October 1995

Professional ratings
Review scores
Source	Rating
AllMusic	3/5 stars
Entertainment Weekly	B+
NME	6/10
Rolling Stone	3/5 stars
Tom Hull	B

Greatest Hits is the first compilation album by the American singer-songwriter Bruce Springsteen, released February 27, 1995, on Columbia Records. It is a collection of some of Springsteen's hit singles and popular album tracks through the years along with four new songs at the end, mostly recorded with the E Street Band in 1995. The latter constituted Springsteen's first (albeit very partial) release with his backing band since the late 1980s. Some of the songs are shorter versions of the original album releases.

The recording of the new tracks was depicted in the 1996 documentary Blood Brothers. "Murder Incorporated" and "This Hard Land" were outtakes from the 1982 sessions for Born in the U.S.A., with the latter being re-recorded more than a decade later, and both have been frequently performed by Springsteen in concert. "Blood Brothers", on the other hand, has been played on only four occasions, including as the opening number of the first concert following keyboardist Danny Federici's death in April 2008. "Secret Garden" became well-known when it was featured on the soundtrack of the 1996 film Jerry Maguire. Alternate versions of several of these new tracks were released on the 1996 Blood Brothers EP and the 1998 box set Tracks.

The compilation was commercially successful, hitting number one on the Billboard 200 and UK Albums Chart, and sold six million copies in the U.S.

== Critical reception ==
Greatest Hits received mixed reviews upon release, with critics pointing out the challenge of summarising a lengthy career with only one album, including both notable omissions and the inclusion of four new tracks that had been cut from earlier albums. William Ruhlmann pointed out that the timing of the release (the day before the Grammy Awards) was notable as "Streets of Philadelphia" was up for five awards.

David Browne of Entertainment Weekly referred to the liner notes when pointing out that some songs appeared to be "chosen for their chart success rather than for artistic merit" which means that several important songs were overlooked. He described the album as invigorating, but also felt that "Murder Incorporated" (a song about the 1930s organized crime group of the same name) was the only good new song on the album and that overall the album felt as if Springsteen did not believe in himself any more.

The Rolling Stone review of the album by Parke Puterbaugh is rather unfavorable. Parke felt that the songs on the collection belonged on their original LP releases, that songs from before Born to Run should have been included, and that the new songs weren't very good.

== Commercial performance ==
The album debuted at number one on the Billboard 200 the week of March 18, 1995, with more than 250,000 copies sold, it remained on the chart for 43 weeks. As of March 2009 it has sold over 4,092,000 copies in the United States according to Nielsen SoundScan. It was certified six times platinum by the Recording Industry Association of America (RIAA) on May 25, 2022, for shipments of 6 million copies

In the United Kingdom the album entered at number one on March 11, 1995, and topped the chart for two non-consecutive weeks. It was present on the chart for 134 weeks. It was certified four times platinum by the British Phonographic Industry (BPI) on March 21, 2014, denoting shipments of 1.2 million units.

== Track listing ==
All tracks are written by Bruce Springsteen.

No.	Title	Original album	Length
1.	"Born to Run"	Born to Run (1975)	4:30
2.	"Thunder Road"	Born to Run	4:48
3.	"Badlands"	Darkness on the Edge of Town (1978)	4:03
4.	"The River"	The River (1980)	5:00
5.	"Hungry Heart"	The River	3:20
6.	"Atlantic City"	Nebraska (1982)	3:56
7.	"Dancing in the Dark"	Born in the U.S.A. (1984)	4:03
8.	"Born in the U.S.A."	Born in the U.S.A.	4:41
9.	"My Hometown" (edit)	Born in the U.S.A.	4:12
10.	"Glory Days" (edit)	Born in the U.S.A.	3:49
11.	"Brilliant Disguise"	Tunnel of Love (1987)	4:15
12.	"Human Touch" (radio version)	Human Touch (1992)	5:10
13.	"Better Days" (edit)	Lucky Town (1992)	3:44
14.	"Streets of Philadelphia" (single edit)	Philadelphia soundtrack (1993)	3:16
15.	"Secret Garden"	New song: Recorded in January 1995 at The Hit Factory, New York City	4:27
16.	"Murder Incorporated"	New song: Recorded at the Power Station, New York City in April/May 1982	3:57
17.	"Blood Brothers"	New song: Recorded in January 1995 at The Hit Factory, New York City	4:34
18.	"This Hard Land"	New song: Recorded in January 1995 at The Hit Factory, New York City	4:50

== Personnel ==
Credits are adapted from the liner notes of Greatest Hits.

- Bruce Springsteen – vocals, guitars, harmonica on "Thunder Road", "This Hard Land", and "Blood Brothers"
- Steven Van Zandt – vocals and guitar on “Glory Days”, electric guitar on "Badlands”, acoustic guitar on "Murder Incorporated" and "Born in the U.S.A.", mandolin on "This Hard Land" and "Glory Days"
- Nils Lofgren – guitar on "Secret Garden", "Blood Brothers", and "This Hard Land"
- Garry Tallent – bass
- Roy Bittan – piano, synthesizer
- Danny Federici – organ, synthesizer, accordion
- Max Weinberg – drums
- Clarence Clemons – saxophone, percussion
- Patti Scialfa – harmony vocals on "Human Touch" and background vocals on "Better Days"
- Backing vocals ("Murder Incorporated") – all of the above except Nils Lofgren and Patti Scialfa
- Frank Pagano – percussion on "Blood Brothers" and "This Hard Land"

Production

- Produced by: Bruce Springsteen, Jon Landau and Chuck Plotkin (and by Steven Van Zandt on "Murder Incorporated")
- Recorded by: Toby Scott
- Mixed by: Bob Clearmountain
- Mastered by: Bob Ludwig
- Assistant engineers: Carl Glanville, Pete Keppler, Ryan Freeland, Jay Militscher and Tony Duino-Black
- Sequence editing: Brian Lee
- Recorded at The Hit Factory

== Charts ==
=== Weekly charts ===
Weekly chart performance for Greatest Hits
Chart (1995)	Peak position
Australian Albums (ARIA)	1
Austrian Albums (Ö3 Austria)	1
Belgian Albums (Ultratop Flanders)	1
Belgian Albums (Ultratop Wallonia)	2
Canada Top Albums/CDs (RPM)	1
Danish Albums (Nielsen Marketing Research)	2
Dutch Albums (Album Top 100)	2
European Albums (Music & Media)	1
Finnish Albums (Seura)	1
French Compilations (SNEP)	1
German Albums (Offizielle Top 100)	1
Hungarian Albums Chart	7
Irish Albums (IFPI)	1
Italian Albums (FIMI)	1
New Zealand Albums (RMNZ)	1
Norwegian Albums (VG-lista)	1
Portuguese Albums (AFP)	1
Spanish Albums (AFYVE)	1
Swedish Albums (Sverigetopplistan)	1
Swiss Albums (Schweizer Hitparade)	1
UK Albums (Official Charts)	1
US Billboard 200	1
Zimbabwean Albums (ZIMA)	1

=== Year-end charts ===
1995 year-end chart performance for Greatest Hits
Chart (1995)	Position
German Albums Chart	10

2019 year-end chart performance for Greatest Hits
Chart (2019)	Position
Irish Albums (IRMA)	49

2020 year-end chart performance for Greatest Hits
Chart (2020)	Position
Irish Albums (IRMA)	30

2021 year-end chart performance for Greatest Hits
Chart (2021)	Position
Irish Albums (IRMA)	25

== Certifications and sales ==
Certifications and sales for Greatest Hits
Region	Certification	Certified units/sales
Australia (ARIA)	10× Platinum	700,000^{‡}
Austria (IFPI Austria)	2× Platinum	100,000^{*}
Belgium (BRMA)	Platinum	50,000^{*}
Canada (Music Canada)	4× Platinum	400,000^{^}
Denmark (IFPI Danmark)	5× Platinum	100,000^{‡}
Finland (Musiikkituottajat)	Platinum	76,419
France (SNEP)	Platinum	300,000^{*}
Germany (BVMI)	2× Platinum	1,000,000^{^}
Ireland (IRMA)	Platinum	15,000^{^}
Italy 1995-1996 sales	—	350,000
Italy (FIMI) sales since 2009	Platinum	50,000^{‡}
Japan (RIAJ)	Platinum	200,000^{^}
Netherlands (NVPI)	2× Platinum	200,000^{^}
New Zealand (RMNZ)	4× Platinum	60,000^{‡}
Norway (IFPI Norway)	2× Platinum	100,000^{*}
Spain (Promusicae)	2× Platinum	200,000^{^}
Sweden (GLF) digipack	Platinum	100,000^{^}
Switzerland (IFPI Switzerland)	Platinum	50,000^{^}
United Kingdom (BPI)	5× Platinum	1,500,000^{‡}
United States (RIAA)	6× Platinum	4,092,000
Summaries
Europe (IFPI)	5× Platinum	5,000,000^{*}
^{*} Sales figures based on certification alone.^{^} Shipments figures based on certification alone.^{‡} Sales+streaming figures based on certification alone.

== See also ==
- List of best-selling albums in Australia
