= Secret Garden (Bruce Springsteen song) =

1995 single by Bruce Springsteen

Single by Bruce Springsteen

from the album Greatest Hits
- B-side: "Thunder Road" (live)
- Released: April 11, 1995
- Genre: Soft rock
- Length: 4:30
- Label: Sony
- Songwriter: Bruce Springsteen
- Producer: Bruce Springsteen, Jon Landau, Chuck Plotkin

Bruce Springsteen singles chronology
"Streets of Philadelphia" (1994)	"Secret Garden" (1995)	"The Ghost of Tom Joad" (1995)

Audio
- "Secret Garden" on YouTube

"Secret Garden" is a song by American musician Bruce Springsteen. It was originally released as a single from his Greatest Hits album on February 27, 1995, on Columbia Records. Upon its initial release, it peaked at number 63 on the US Billboard Hot 100. Two years later, after being featured on the soundtrack for the 1996 movie Jerry Maguire, it was re-released as a two-track single, which featured a live version of "Thunder Road". This re-issue returned the song to the Hot 100, where it peaked at number 19 and remains Springsteen's final top-40 hit in the United States to date. It also charted on the Adult Top 40 and Top 40 Mainstream, peaking at number 12 and number 15 respectively.

"Secret Garden" was also featured in the film Night at the Roxbury and the TV show It's Always Sunny in Philadelphia. The song was also synced with producer Gary Dell'Abate's 'Love Tape' to his ex-girlfriend on The Howard Stern Show. It was featured in the Cold Case episode, "Ravaged", in 2005, and was featured along with 10 other Springsteen songs in the HBO miniseries Show Me a Hero.

The song has been performed only a handful of times live. It was performed three times in 1995 in New York, and one time on the Reunion Tour in 2000. The song returned to the setlist once in 2013 when Springsteen performed it in the United Kingdom. After a three-year hiatus, Springsteen performed it twice in 2016 in New Jersey and Washington, D.C., and once in 2017 in Brisbane, Australia.

== Critical reception ==
Steve Baltin from Cash Box praised the song, noting that it's a ballad that follows in the footsteps of the softer material from his Human Touch and Lucky Town albums. He added that featuring the reunited E Street Band, "it is one of the prettier melodies Springsteen has ever come up with. Meaning that with his recent Grammy success and the success of previous ballads ('I'm on Fire'), this could be a monster hit. lt'd be hard to find a more deserving song than this one, as Springsteen once again puts the words and melody together to show why, despite the knocks he took in '92, he remains alone at the top."

In 1997, British magazine Music Week gave "Secret Garden" three out of five and named it a "melancholic track", noting that "this keyboard-led, introspective love song is low key, sparse and touching." Music & Media described it as "a ethereal song more in line with 'Streets of Philadelphia' and 'Tunnel of Love'." Dele Fadele from NME felt "the wounded undertow" of the song "carries a strain of machismo".

== Track listing ==
1. "Secret Garden" – 4:29
2. "Secret Garden - string version" – 4:38
3. "Murder Incorporated - live version" – 5:50
4. "Thunder Road - Live" – 5:29

== Personnel ==
According to album liner notes:

- Bruce Springsteen - vocals, guitar
- Roy Bittan - piano
- Clarence Clemons - saxophone, percussion
- Danny Federici - electric keyboards
- Nils Lofgren - guitar
- Garry Tallent - bass
- Max Weinberg - drums

== Charts ==
=== Weekly charts ===
Weekly chart performance for "Secret Garden"
Chart (1995–1997)	Peak position
Australia (ARIA)	9
Canada Top Singles (RPM)	7
Europe (Eurochart Hot 100)	47
Europe (European Hit Radio)	9
Finland (Suomen virallinen lista)	14
Germany (GfK)	66
Iceland (Íslenski Listinn Topp 40)	27
Ireland (IRMA)	14
Italy (Musica e dischi)	23
Netherlands (Dutch Top 40)	31
Netherlands (Single Top 100)	29
Quebec (ADISQ)	9
UK Singles (Official Charts)	17
US Billboard Hot 100	19
US Adult Contemporary (Billboard)	5
US Adult Pop Airplay (Billboard)	12
US Pop Airplay (Billboard)	15
US Cash Box Top 100	66

=== Year-end charts ===
Year-end chart performance for "Secret Garden"
Chart (1995)	Position
Canada Top Singles (RPM)	83

Chart (1997)	Position
US Billboard Hot 100	77

== Certifications ==
Certifications for "Secret Garden"
Region	Certification	Certified units/sales
Australia (ARIA)	Platinum	70,000^{‡}
New Zealand (RMNZ)	Gold	15,000^{‡}
United Kingdom (BPI)	Gold	400,000^{‡}
United States (RIAA)	Gold	500,000^{‡}
^{‡} Sales+streaming figures based on certification alone.
