= Streets of Philadelphia =

1994 single by Bruce Springsteen

Single by Bruce Springsteen

from the album Philadelphia Official Soundtrack
- B-side: "If I Should Fall Behind"
- Released: February 11, 1994
- Studio: Thrill Hill West (Beverly Hills, California)
- Genre: Soft rock; synth-rock
- Length: 4:12 (LP soundtrack version); 3:50 (CD soundtrack version); 3:15 (single edit)
- Label: Columbia
- Songwriter: Bruce Springsteen
- Producers: Bruce Springsteen; Chuck Plotkin

Bruce Springsteen singles chronology
"If I Should Fall Behind" (1992)	"Streets of Philadelphia" (1994)	"Secret Garden" (1995)

Music video
- Streets of Philadelphia on YouTube

"Streets of Philadelphia" is a song written and performed by American rock musician Bruce Springsteen for the 1993 film Philadelphia, starring Tom Hanks, an early mainstream film dealing with HIV/AIDS. Released as a single by Columbia Records in February 1994, the song was a hit in many countries, topping the singles charts of Austria, Canada, France, Germany, Iceland, Ireland, Italy, and Norway. In the United States, the single peaked at number nine on the Billboard Hot 100, becoming Springsteen's 12th and most recent top-10 hit as of 2026. Its music video depicted Springsteen walking along desolate city streets and was directed by Jonathan Demme, who directed Philadelphia, with his nephew Ted Demme.

The song received critical acclaim, including the Academy Award for Best Original Song and four Grammy Awards for Song of the Year, Best Rock Song, Best Male Rock Vocal Performance, and Best Song Written Specifically for a Motion Picture or Television. In 2004, it finished at number 68 on AFI's 100 Years...100 Songs survey of top songs in American cinema. The song is listed among the Rock and Roll Hall of Fame's 500 Songs that Shaped Rock and Roll.

== Background and release ==
In early 1993, Philadelphia director Jonathan Demme asked Springsteen to write a song for his film, adding "I want it to play in the malls." Springsteen replied, "Well, I'm interested, so I'd like to come up with a song for you. If you give me some time, I'll see, but I can't promise." Springsteen recalled adding, "I'm not very good at scores."

In late August 1993, following the conclusion of his 1992-93 world tour, Springsteen recorded a demo of his completed song at Thrill Hill, his home recording studio in Beverly Hills, California, including all the song's instrumentation. He mailed the tape to Demme, who later said, "my wife and I sat down and listened to it, and we were literally weeping by the end". Meanwhile, background vocals were added by Tommy Sims, who played bass on Springsteen's 1992-93 tour.

In October 1993, Springsteen recorded the song at A&M Studios in Los Angeles, with Sims, Ornette Coleman on saxophone, and vocals by "Little" Jimmy Scott. It was mixed by Bob Clearmountain, included in the soundtrack, and the video was recorded. In mid-December, Springsteen replaced the video with his home demo from August, re-shooting some video scenes to eliminate Scott. The four-man combo version can be heard in a brief scene in the film when Tom Hanks exits Denzel Washington's office, but it was Springsteen alone playing over the opening credits.

"Streets of Philadelphia" was released on February 11, 1994. It is the first single from the film's original soundtrack, with Springsteen singing and playing all the instruments with Sims on background vocal.

The song became a worldwide chart success. "Streets of Philadelphia" achieved greater popularity in Europe than in the United States. It peaked at number nine on the Billboard Hot 100 chart, but became a number-one single in Germany, France, and Austria. It peaked at number two in the United Kingdom, becoming Springsteen's highest charting hit in the UK. The song reached number four in Australia, and spent five weeks at number one in Ireland.

As of 2024, "Streets of Philadelphia" is Springsteen's most recent top ten hit in the United States. The song has been included in many subsequent Springsteen compilation albums, including Greatest Hits (1995), The Essential Bruce Springsteen (2003), and Best of Bruce Springsteen (2024). It was also included on the album All Time Greatest Movie Songs, released by Sony in 1999.

== Critical reception ==
Larry Flick from Billboard magazine wrote, "Springsteen's empathetic lyrics and performance zoom straight for the heart, traveling atop a slow and sturdy beat and pillowy synths. A powerful song with or without the image of the film to support it." Troy J. Augusto from Cash Box named it Pick of the Week, describing it as an "appropriately somber song," writing, "Written in the first person, this slow-moving ballad documents the struggle of a downtrodden and forgotten soul left to wander the dark streets, out of sight of an uncaring society. Like Hanks' character in the film, Springsteen's unfortunate draws on our sympathy, not because he asks for help but because he appears unable to help himself, an important distinction. One of The Boss’ best." Kent Zimmerman from the Gavin Report concluded, "Bruce Springsteen's custom-written theme is as scary a portrait of AIDS as you're likely to hear all year long. Combining the gruesome fears of urban abandonment coupled with the tragedy of a fatal disease in just one song is surely a miracle of subtlety." Robert Hilburn from the Los Angeles Times deemed it "a moving ballad about a man whose body is being destroyed by AIDS", and "a work that shows Springsteen, despite all the questions raised by changes in his life in recent years, can still write purposeful songs that connect on a deeply emotional level." He added, "Springsteen sings in a voice that expresses the helplessness and heartache of someone dying of AIDS as convincingly as Springsteen once conveyed the dreams and aspirations of youth."

In his weekly UK chart commentary, James Masterton said, "However good it may be the brooding ballad is hardly classic Bruce and can be expected to shuttle rapidly out next week". A reviewer from Music & Media commented, "The man who used to walk upon E-Street, now roams the Philly lanes. This synth-dominated track from the OST Philadelphia revives the "etherealism" of Tunnel Of Love." Stephen Dalton from NME wrote, "The Boss fights through eerie ambient mists and prowls in a buried, snaking backbeat as he pleads for human warmth in a freezing world. It's a heartbreaker, surpassing most of Brucie's recent chest-beating in its soulful understatement." Neil Spencer from The Observer felt Springsteen's "sombre" "Streets of Philadelphia" "reflects a dark night of the soul as the disease takes hold". Pete Stanton of Smash Hits gave the song a score of four out of five, writing, "This is far gentler, far lovelier and far nicer than anything he's done for ages. Taken from the excellent film [...], this should see Bruce back in the charts."

== Music video ==
The accompanying music video for the song, directed by Jonathan Demme and his nephew Ted Demme in December 1993, begins by showing Springsteen walking along desolate city streets, followed by a bustling park and schoolyard, interspersed with footage from the film. After a quick shot of Rittenhouse Square, it ends with Springsteen walking along the Delaware River, with the Benjamin Franklin Bridge in the background. Tom Hanks is also visible as Andrew Beckett, the lead character he plays in the film, looking on as Springsteen begins the final verse. One newspaper review called it "the saddest track cut this decade".

The vocal track for the video was recorded live with a hidden microphone, to a pre-recorded instrumental track. This technique, appropriate for emotionally intense songs for which conventional video lip-syncing would seem especially false, was used by John Mellencamp in parts of the video for his 1985 song "Rain on the Scarecrow", and by Springsteen himself in the video for his 1987 single "Brilliant Disguise", singing the song directly into the camera as he sits on the edge of his chair on a Sandy Hook, New Jersey sound stage.

== Live performances ==
Because of the song's many award nominations, Springsteen played the song live in three high-visibility, prime-time awards show broadcasts: at the 66th Academy Awards in March 1994, at the MTV Video Music Awards in September 1994, and at the 37th Annual Grammy Awards in March 1995. Between this, Philadelphia's strong box office performance, and the single being a top 10 pop hit, "Streets of Philadelphia" became one of Springsteen's best-known songs to the general music audience.

Springsteen went on to perform the song only sparingly in his concerts. In solo guitar form and missing the song's trademark synthesizers-and-drums feel, it was performed semi-regularly on the solo and stark Ghost of Tom Joad Tour between 1995 and 1997. After that, the song was performed only appearing a dozen times on the E Street Band Reunion Tour in 1999 and 2000. As of January 2016, the song has been played only a few times across the nine tours since then.

== Accolades ==
Award	Category	Result
Academy Awards	Best Original Song	Won
ASCAP Film and Television Music Awards	Most Performed Songs from Motion Pictures	Won
Golden Globe Awards	Best Original Song	Won
Grammy Awards	Record of the Year	Nominated
Grammy Awards	Song of the Year	Won
Grammy Awards	Best Male Rock Vocal Performance	Won
Grammy Awards	Best Rock Song	Won
Grammy Awards	Best Song Written Specifically for a Motion Picture or for Television	Won
MTV Movie Awards	Best Song from a Movie	Nominated
MTV Video Music Awards	Best Male Video	Nominated
MTV Video Music Awards	Best Video from a Film	Won

== Track listings ==
- CD, 7-inch, and cassette single
1. "Streets of Philadelphia" – 3:15
2. "If I Should Fall Behind" – 4:43
- CD maxi and maxi cassette
1. "Streets of Philadelphia" – 3:15
2. "If I Should Fall Behind" – 4:43
3. "Growin' Up" – 3:13
4. "The Big Muddy" – 4:11

The B-sides were selected from the previous year's live album In Concert/MTV Plugged.

== Personnel ==
According to authors Philippe Margotin and Jean-Michel Guesdon:

- Bruce Springsteen – vocals, keyboards, bass, drum machine, tambourine
- Tommy Sims, Jimmy Scott – background vocals

Technical

- Bruce Springsteen – producer
- Chuck Plotkin – producer
- Toby Scott – engineer
- Bob Clearmountain – mixer

== Charts ==
=== Weekly charts ===
Weekly chart performance for "Streets of Philadelphia"
Chart (1994)	Peak position
Australia (ARIA)	4
Austria (Ö3 Austria Top 40)	1
Belgium (Ultratop 50 Flanders)	2
Canada Retail Singles (The Record)	1
Canada Top Singles (RPM)	1
Canada Adult Contemporary (RPM)	6
Denmark (IFPI)	3
Europe (Eurochart Hot 100)	1
Europe (European AC Radio)	1
Europe (European Hit Radio)	1
Finland (Suomen virallinen lista)	3
France (SNEP)	1
Germany (GfK)	1
Iceland (Íslenski Listinn Topp 40)	1
Ireland (IRMA)	1
Israel (Israeli Singles Chart)	7
Italy (Musica e dischi)	1
Netherlands (Dutch Top 40)	6
Netherlands (Single Top 100)	5
New Zealand (Recorded Music NZ)	3
Norway (VG-lista)	1
Quebec (ADISQ)	1
Scottish Singles Sales (Official Charts)	2
Sweden (Sverigetopplistan)	3
Switzerland (Schweizer Hitparade)	2
UK Singles (Official Charts)	2
UK Airplay (Music Week)	3
Uruguay (UPI)	8
US Billboard Hot 100	9
US Adult Contemporary (Billboard)	3
US Dance Singles Sales (Billboard)	43
US Mainstream Rock (Billboard)	3
US Pop Airplay (Billboard)	13
US Cash Box Top 100	6

=== Year-end charts ===
Year-end chart performance for "Streets of Philadelphia"
Chart (1994)	Position
Australia (ARIA)	39
Austria (Ö3 Austria Top 40)	4
Belgium (Ultratop)	8
Brazil (Crowley)	86
Canada Top Singles (RPM)	4
Canada Adult Contemporary (RPM)	30
Europe (Eurochart Hot 100)	3
Europe (European Hit Radio)	4
France (SNEP)	5
Germany (Media Control)	3
Iceland (Íslenski Listinn Topp 40)	2
Italy (Musica e dischi)	2
Netherlands (Dutch Top 40)	13
Netherlands (Single Top 100)	31
New Zealand (RIANZ)	50
Sweden (Topplistan)	13
Switzerland (Schweizer Hitparade)	12
UK Singles (OCC)	22
UK Airplay (Music Week)	10
US Billboard Hot 100	54
US Adult Contemporary (Billboard)	18
US Cash Box Top 100	49

=== Decade-end charts ===
Decade-end chart performance for "Streets of Philadelphia"
Chart (1990–1999)	Position
Canada (Nielsen SoundScan)	52

== Certifications and sales ==
Certifications and sales for "Streets of Philadelphia"
Region	Certification	Certified units/sales
Australia (ARIA)	3× Platinum	210,000^{‡}
Austria (IFPI Austria)	Gold	25,000^{*}
Brazil	—	100,000
Denmark (IFPI Danmark)	Platinum	90,000^{‡}
France (SNEP)	Gold	250,000^{*}
Germany (BVMI)	Gold	400,000
Italy (FIMI)	Platinum	100,000^{‡}
New Zealand (RMNZ)	2× Platinum	60,000^{‡}
Norway (IFPI Norway)	Gold	
Spain (Promusicae)	Platinum	60,000^{‡}
United Kingdom (BPI)	Platinum	600,000^{‡}
United States (RIAA)	Platinum	1,000,000^{‡}
^{*} Sales figures based on certification alone.^{‡} Sales+streaming figures based on certification alone.

== Release history ==
Release dates and formats for "Streets of Philadelphia"
Region	Date	Format(s)	Label(s)	Ref.
United States	February 11, 1994	7-inch vinyl; CD; cassette	Columbia	
Australia	February 28, 1994	CD; cassette	Columbia	
United Kingdom	March 7, 1994	7-inch vinyl; CD; cassette	Columbia	
Japan	March 10, 1994	CD	Sony	

== Cover versions ==
The song has been covered live by Jack Folland, Tori Amos, Melissa Etheridge, David Gray, Waxahatchee and Lonely the Brave. Recorded covers have been released by Ray Conniff (on his 1997 album, I Love Movies), Casiotone for the Painfully Alone, Marah, Liv Kristine, Molly Johnson, Bettye LaVette, SALEM, Gregorian and I Muvrini with Anggun. Philadelphia rappers, Cassidy & the Larsiny Family have made a cover of this song on the Put Ya L in the Sky mixtape, in an effort to stop crime in the city. French artist Patrick Bruel and U2 covered the song, translating the lyrics into French while retaining the music.

After the movie Philadelphia was released, many artists covered it. In 1993, when Rhino Records assembled its box set, Academy Award Winning Songs (1934–1993), the same year, it was unable to license the Springsteen track and instead commissioned Richie Havens to record a cover version.

In 2010, the French string quartet Quatuor Ébène recorded a version on their album Fiction, with drummer Richard Héry, sung by the quartet's violist Mathieu Herzog.

The song is also covered by the Fray on their album Scars and Stories, released in 2012.

In 2011, the German group Gregorian released a Gregorian chant version of the song in their album Masters of Chant Chapter VIII.

Also in 2011, Idols South Africa season seven winner Dave van Vuuren performed the song on the show and recorded it on his album Free the Animals.

In 2009, it was covered by Luis Eduardo Aute in Catalan as "Els carrers de Philadelphia", for the CD of TV3's telethon La Marató.

In February 2013, Elton John performed the song at the National Academy of Recording Arts and Sciences tribute concert honoring Bruce Springsteen as the 2013 MusiCares Person of the Year.

Fat White Family's Saul Adamczewski and Childhood's Ben Romans-Hopcraft covered the song on their 2018 album, Karaoke for One: Vol 1, under the band name Insecure Men.

Waxahatchee covered the song in 2021 for the deluxe issue of her 2020 album Saint Cloud.

Jazz saxophonist Joshua Redman included a version on his 2023 album Where Are We, with vocals by Gabrielle Cavassa.

== See also ==
- "Streets of Minneapolis", 2026 song by Springsteen
- List of number-one hits of 1994 (Austria)
- List of number-one singles of 1994 (Canada)
- List of European number-one hits of 1994
- List of number-one singles of 1994 (France)
- List of number-one hits of 1994 (Germany)
- List of number-one singles of 1994 (Ireland)
- List of 1964–1994 number-one hits in Norway
