= Blood Sisters =

Blood Sisters may refer to:

== Film and television ==
- Sisters (1972 film) or Blood Sisters, a film by Brian De Palma
- BloodSisters (1995 film), a documentary by Michelle Handelman
- The Blood Sisters (TV series), a 2018 Filipino television series
- Blood Sisters (TV series), a Netflix original limited-series
- "Blood Sisters" (Star Wars Rebels)

== Literature ==
- Blood Sisters (novel), a 2005 novel by Barbara Keating and Stephanie Keating
- Blood Sisters, a 1981 novel by Valerie Miner
- Bloodsisters, a 1982 novel by John A. Russo
- "Blood Sisters", a short story by Greg Egan in Hackers (anthology), a 1991 collection

== See also ==
- Blood brother (disambiguation)
- Sisters Adorers of the Precious Blood, a religious order
- San Diego Blood Sisters
