= In Concert/MTV Plugged =

Live album by Bruce Springsteen
- Released: April 12, 1993
- Recorded: September 22, 1992
- Venues: Warner Hollywood Studios, Los Angeles
- Genre: Rock
- Length: 71:38
- Label: Columbia
- Producers: Bruce Springsteen, Jon Landau

Bruce Springsteen chronology
Lucky Town (1992)	In Concert/MTV Plugged (1993)	Greatest Hits (1995)

Singles from In Concert/MTV Plugged
- 1. "Lucky Town (Live)" Released: 1993

Professional ratings
Review scores
Source	Rating
AllMusic	3/5 stars
NME	6/10
Pitchfork	6.1/10
Tom Hull	B−

In Concert/MTV Plugged is a 1992 concert video and 1993 live album by Bruce Springsteen.

It is part of MTV's Unplugged series, recorded on September 22, 1992, at the Warner Hollywood Studios in Los Angeles near the start of Springsteen's tour for Human Touch and Lucky Town. The concert originally aired on MTV on November 11, 1992, with a one-hour Springsteen documentary beforehand.

Springsteen played one song, the previously unreleased "Red Headed Woman", solo on acoustic guitar, then he and his hired band (this was during the time the E Street Band was dissolved, although members Roy Bittan and Patti Scialfa continued to perform with Springsteen) used amplified instruments the rest of the show; hence, the concert was called MTV Plugged (sometimes written XXPlugged after the album cover art). Reportedly Springsteen had been unhappy with the touring band's rehearsals of acoustic arrangements, and this is what led him to break the Unplugged format. Commercially the album was certified Gold in the US.

== Album ==
The album had a moderate reception. "With E Street ringers focusing on Bruce's 'solo' material...," said Entertainment Weekly, "Well, we won't go there." The song played on the show were relatively intense renditions, as highlighted by Springsteen's vocals and much of the instrumental accompaniment. The sombre, folk-oriented "Atlantic City" was played in a rock setting, with a rhythm intro on electric guitar as well as Springsteen's solos on the outro. Springsteen played outro solos on most of the rock songs, including "Lucky Town". The album reached number 4 in a seven-week run on the UK chart.

In 1997, five years after the concert was recorded, the album was rereleased in the US and appeared for the first time on the US charts, peaking at number 189 on the Billboard 200. The recording of "Thunder Road" from the concert was nominated for a Grammy Award for Best Male Rock Vocal Performance.

=== Track listing ===
All songs written by Bruce Springsteen.

No.	Title	Length
1.	"Red Headed Woman" (previously unreleased)	2:51
2.	"Better Days"	4:27
3.	"Atlantic City"	5:38
4.	"Darkness on the Edge of Town"	4:40
5.	"Man's Job"	5:43
6.	"Human Touch"	7:30
7.	"Lucky Town"	5:08
8.	"I Wish I Were Blind"	5:14
9.	"Thunder Road"	5:28
10.	"Light of Day" (from the soundtrack to the film Light of Day – originally performed by Joan Jett & Michael J. Fox)	8:17
11.	"If I Should Fall Behind"	4:45
12.	"Living Proof"	6:05
13.	"My Beautiful Reward"	5:58

== Video ==
A VHS and Laserdisc release of the show preceded any audio release, coming on December 15, 1992, and running 120 minutes. More songs were present here than on the later audio incarnation and on what actually aired on MTV.

On November 9, 2004, a DVD reissuing of this performance was released.

=== Selection listing ===
1. "Red Headed Woman"
2. "Better Days"
3. "Local Hero"
4. "Atlantic City"
5. "Darkness on the Edge of Town"
6. "Man's Job"
7. "Growin' Up"
8. "Human Touch"
9. "Lucky Town"
10. "I Wish I Were Blind"
11. "Thunder Road"
12. "Light of Day"
13. "The Big Muddy"
14. "57 Channels (And Nothin' On)"
15. "My Beautiful Reward"
16. "Glory Days"

Bonus songs not included in the MTV show:

1. "Living Proof"
2. "If I Should Fall Behind"
3. "Roll of the Dice" (DVD Only)

== Personnel ==
- Bruce Springsteen – lead vocals, lead and rhythm guitar and harmonica

The Band's Musicians

- Zack Alford (as Zachary Alford) – drums
- Roy Bittan – keyboards
- Shane Fontayne – lead and rhythm guitar
- Tommy Sims – bass
- Crystal Taliefero – acoustic guitar, percussion and background vocals
- Gia Ciambotti – background vocals
- Carol Dennis – background vocals
- Cleopatra Kennedy – background vocals
- Bobby King – background vocals
- Angel Rogers – background vocals
- Patti Scialfa – acoustic guitar and harmony vocals on "Human Touch"

== Charts ==
=== Weekly charts ===
Weekly chart performance for In Concert/MTV Plugged
Chart (1993–1997)	Peak position
Austrian Albums (Ö3 Austria)	15
Dutch Albums (Album Top 100)	4
European Albums (Music & Media)	7
German Albums (Offizielle Top 100)	19
Italian Albums (Musica e Dischi)	8
Norwegian Albums (VG-lista)	3
Portuguese Albums (AFP)	1
Swedish Albums (Sverigetopplistan)	14
Swiss Albums (Schweizer Hitparade)	8
UK Albums (Official Charts)	4
US Billboard 200	189

Chart (2009)	Peak position
Spanish Albums (Promusicae)	88

=== Year-end charts ===
1993 year-end chart performance for In Concert/MTV Plugged
Chart (1993)	Position
Dutch Albums (Album Top 100)	98
Spanish Albums (AFYVE)	45

== Certifications and sales ==
Certifications and sales for In Concert/MTV Plugged
Region	Certification	Certified units/sales
Australia (ARIA) video	Platinum	15,000^{^}
Spain (Promusicae)	Gold	50,000^{^}
United States (RIAA) video	Gold	50,000^{^}
^{^} Shipments figures based on certification alone.
