= Blood Brothers =

A blood brother is a male who swears loyalty to another male.

Blood Brother, Blood Brothers, Bloodbrothers, or The Blood Brothers may also refer to:

== Film ==
- The Blood Brothers (1973 film), a Hong Kong film by Chang Cheh
- Blood Brothers (1974 film), an Italian film starring Claudia Cardinale
- Blood Brothers (1975 film), an East German film by Werner W. Wallroth
- Bloodbrothers (1978 film), an American film starring Richard Gere, based on a novel by Richard Price (see below)
- Blood Brothers (1993 film), a made-for-television film featuring Richard Yearwood
- Blood Brothers (film series), a 1993 Australian documentary series (four films)
- Blood Brothers (1996 film), a documentary about a Bruce Springsteen and The E Street Band reunion
- Blood Brothers (2004 film) (Jiang Hu), a Hong Kong gang film
- Bloodbrothers (2005 film), a Swedish film starring Sofia Helin
- Blood Brothers (2007 Chinese film), a Chinese film by Alexi Tan
- The Warlords or The Blood Brothers, a 2007 Chinese film
- Blood Brothers (2007 Indian film), an AIDS-awareness film produced by the Bill Gates foundation
- Blood Brothers (2011 film), an Australian TV film featuring Cariba Heine
- Blood Brother (2013 film), a 2013 Sundance Film Festival documentary
- Blood Brother (2018 film), a WWE film
- The Blood Brothers (2024 film), a Philippine film directed by Cesar Montano
- Blood Brothers (2025 film), a Malaysian film directed by Syafiq Yusof

== Literature ==
- Blood Brothers (comics), two Marvel Comics characters
- Bloodbrothers (Price novel), a 1976 novel by Richard Price
- Blood Brother (Traces novel), a novel by Malcolm Rose
- Blood Brother (Arnold novel), an Armed Services Edition by Elliott Arnold
- Blood Brothers (Fyle novel), a novel by Clifford Nelson Fyle
- Blood Brothers (Lumley novel), a 1992 novel by Brian Lumley
- Blood Brothers (Haffner novel), a 1932 novel by Ernst Haffner

== Music ==
- Blood Brothers (musical), a 1983 musical by Willy Russell
  - Blood Brothers (1995 album), a London cast recording of the musical
- The Blood Brothers (band), an American post-hardcore band

=== Albums ===
- Bloodbrothers (album), a 1978 album by The Dictators
- Blood Brothers (Kastro and E.D.I. album) (2002)
- Blood Brothers (OuterSpace album) (2006)
- Blood Brothers (Blind Channel album) (2018)
- Blood Brothers (EP), a 1996 EP by Bruce Springsteen & the E Street Band released with the documentary
- Bloodbrothers, an album by Gil Mantera's Party Dream

=== Songs ===
- "Blood Brother" (Tom Robinson song) (1990)
- "Blood Brothers", a song by Luke Bryan from Crash My Party
- "Blood Brothers", a song by Nicole Dollanganger from Curdled Milk
- "Blood Brothers", a song by Earth, Wind & Fire from Millennium
- "Blood Brothers", a song by Iron Maiden from Brave New World
- "Blood Brothers", a song by Ingrid Michaelson from Human Again
- "Blood Brothers", a song by Malevolent Creation from Eternal
- "Blood Brothers", a song by Manowar from Gods of War
- "Blood Brothers", a song by Papa Roach from Infest
- "Blood Brothers", a song by Amy Shark from Night Thinker

== Television episodes ==
- "Blood Brothers" (Casualty)
- "Blood Brother" (Conan the Adventurer)
- "Blood Brothers" (CSI: Miami)
- "Blood Brothers" (Law & Order: Special Victims Unit)
- "Blood Brothers" (M*A*S*H)
- "Blood Brothers" (MacGyver)
- "Blood Brothers" (Never the Twain)
- "Blood Brothers" (The Outer Limits)
- "Blood Brother" (Roswell)
- "Blood Brothers" (The Vampire Diaries)
- "Blood Brothers: The Joey DiPaolo Story", episode of Lifestories: Families in Crisis about Joey DiPaolo, an 11-year-old living with HIV

== Other uses ==
- Blood Brothers Machine Company, an American company
- Blood Brothers (Call of Cthulhu), a 1990 anthology of adventures for the role-playing game Call of Cthulhu
- Blood Bros., a 1990 arcade game

== See also ==
- Blood Sisters (disambiguation)
- Sworn Brothers (disambiguation)
- Bloody Brothers, an Indian web series
- Brother's Blood, a 2009 album by Kevin Devine
