= If I Should Fall Behind (song) =

Single by Bruce Springsteen

from the album Lucky Town
- B-side: If I Should Fall Behind (live); "One Step Up"; "Meeting Across the River"
- Released: 1992
- Genre: Rock
- Length: 2:55
- Label: Columbia
- Songwriter: Bruce Springsteen
- Producers: Jon Landau; Chuck Plotkin; Bruce Springsteen

Bruce Springsteen singles chronology
"57 Channels (And Nothin' On)" (1992)	"If I Should Fall Behind" (1992)	"Streets of Philadelphia" (1994)

"If I Should Fall Behind" is a song by the American singer-songwriter Bruce Springsteen from his tenth album, Lucky Town (1992). It was released by Columbia Records as a single in Europe and Australia, in both 7" and CD format, and either as a single-sided or maxi single.

The song is dedicated to Bruce Springsteen's second wife and bandmate Patti Scialfa; Springsteen himself considers it as one of his best songs about love.

== Reception ==
Despite not being a hit on the charts, "If I Should Fall Behind" is a fan-favorite and well-received. Rolling Stone ranks the song #41 among Springsteen's greatest songs, and describes it as "hushed and solemn as a hymn".

== Charts ==
Chart (1993)	Peak position
Australia (ARIA)	196

== Other releases ==
"If I Should Fall Behind" was released also as the B-side of Springsteen's hit single "Streets of Philadelphia"; live versions were released on the albums In Concert/MTV Plugged, Bruce Springsteen & The E Street Band: Live in New York City and even the live album with the Seeger Sessions Band Bruce Springsteen with The Sessions Band: Live in Dublin. All three versions have music videos, and the song was also re-recorded for another music video with the same arrangement as the NYC live version, featuring Van Zandt, Scialfa and Clemons on vocals. The song was also featured on the 2015 version of the compilation The Essential Bruce Springsteen.
