= Blood Brothers (EP) =

EP by Bruce Springsteen
- Released: March 1996
- Recorded: January/February 1995 at The Hit Factory, New York, NY and Tramps, New York City
- Genre: Rock
- Length: 23:01
- Label: Columbia
- Producer: Bruce Springsteen; Jon Landau; Chuck Plotkin

Bruce Springsteen chronology
The Ghost of Tom Joad (1995)	Blood Brothers (1996)	Tracks (1998)

Bruce Springsteen and the E Street Band chronology
Greatest Hits (1995)	Blood Brothers (1996)	Tracks (1998)

Professional ratings
Review scores
Source	Rating
Pitchfork	5.4/10

Blood Brothers is a five-song EP by Bruce Springsteen and the E Street Band, released in 1996. The EP was originally released along with a film, also titled Blood Brothers, which documented the 1995 temporary reuniting of Springsteen with the band to record extra tracks for his Greatest Hits release of that year. Long out of print, the EP was re-released in January 2014 to ITunes, Spotify and other download sites.

== Background ==
Four of the five songs on the EP were written and recorded in 1995 during the band's Greatest Hits sessions while "Murder Incorporated" was recorded live at Tramps, NYC in February 1995. The 1995 sessions marked the first time since 1984 that Springsteen and the entire E Street Band recorded together. Part of the band had worked on Springsteen's 1987 album, Tunnel of Love before Springsteen split from the E Street Band in 1989.

The title track was also released on the Greatest Hits album in an acoustic version. The studio version of "Murder Incorporated" can also be found on Greatest Hits along with the original version of "Secret Garden" minus strings. The live version of "Murder Incorporated" featured here is the same version used in the "Murder Incorporated" music video. "High Hopes" and "Without You" were featured on another single, which was rare and hard to find.

In 2013, Springsteen re-recorded "High Hopes" to be the first single off of his eighteenth studio album, High Hopes, which was released in January 2014.

== Track listing ==
All tracks are written by Bruce Springsteen, except where noted.

No.	Title	Writer(s)	Length
1.	"Blood Brothers (alternate rock version)"		4:02
2.	"High Hopes"	Tim Scott McConnell	4:20
3.	"Murder Incorporated (Live)"		5:47
4.	"Secret Garden (string version)"		4:27
5.	"Without You"		3:59

== Personnel ==
- Bruce Springsteen - guitar, vocals, harmonica
- Roy Bittan - piano, backing vocals
- Clarence Clemons - saxophone, backing vocals, percussion
- Danny Federici - organ, synthesizer, backing vocals
- Nils Lofgren - electric guitar, backing vocals
- Patti Scialfa - acoustic guitar, vocals
- Garry Tallent - bass, backing vocals
- Steve Van Zandt - guitar, backing vocals
- Max Weinberg - drums, backing vocals
- David Kahne - string arrangement and string synthesizer on "Secret Garden"
- Lisa Lowell - backing vocals on "High Hopes"
- Frank Pagano - percussion on "High Hopes," backing vocals on "Without You"
- Chuck Plotkin - backing vocals on "Without You"
- Soozie Tyrell - backing vocals on "High Hopes"
