= High Hopes (Tim Scott McConnell song) =

1985 song by Tim Scott McConnell, recorded in 1995 by Bruce Springsteen

Song by Bruce Springsteen and the E Street Band

from the album Blood Brothers (EP)
- Released: 1995
- Recorded: January 1995
- Genre: Rock
- Length: 4:20
- Label: Columbia
- Songwriter: Tim Scott McConnell
- Producers: Bruce Springsteen and Jon Landau

"High Hopes" is a song that was recorded by American musicians Bruce Springsteen and the E Street Band during their 1995 Greatest Hits sessions and eventually released on the Blood Brothers (EP) in 1996. The song was written and originally recorded in 1985 by Tim Scott McConnell. on his album High Lonesome Sound. The song was also released on a record with McConnell's band The Havalinas in 1990.

== 2013 re-recording ==
"High Hopes"

Single by Bruce Springsteen

from the album High Hopes
- Released: November 25, 2013
- Recorded: March 2013; Studios 301, Sydney
- Genre: Alternative rock, funk rock
- Length: 4:56
- Label: Columbia
- Songwriter: Tim Scott McConnell
- Producers: Ron Aniello and Bruce Springsteen

Bruce Springsteen singles chronology
"Death to My Hometown" (2012)	"High Hopes" (2013)	"Just Like Fire Would" (2014)

Music video
- "High Hopes" on YouTube

On November 25, 2013, Springsteen released a brand new recording of the song along with a music video which was the first single from his eighteenth studio album, High Hopes, released in January 2014.

=== Recording ===
I was working on a record of some of our best unreleased material from the past decade when Tom Morello (sitting in for Steve [Van Zandt] during the Australian leg of our [Wrecking Ball Tour] tour) suggested we ought to add "High Hopes" to our live set. I had cut "High Hopes," a song by Tim Scott McConnell of the LA based Havalinas, in the 90′s. We worked it up in our Aussie rehearsals and Tom then proceeded to burn the house down with it. We re-cut it mid tour at Studios 301 in Sydney.

— Bruce Springsteen

=== Charts ===
Weekly chart performance for "High Hopes"
Chart (2013–14)	Peak position
Belgium (Ultratip Bubbling Under Flanders)	36
Belgium (Ultratip Bubbling Under Wallonia)	30
France (SNEP)	145
Hungary (Stream Top 40)	3
Italy (Musica e Dischi)	48
Japan Hot 100 (Billboard)	39
Slovenia (SloTop50)	45
Spain (Promusicae)	33
Switzerland (Schweizer Hitparade)	64
US Adult Alternative Airplay (Billboard)	15
