= Hurry Up Sundown =

Hurry Up Sundown may refer to:

- "Hurry Up Sundown", a song by Bruce Springsteen from his 2014 EP American Beauty
- "Hurry Up Sundown", a song by The Balloon Farm
