= Blood Brothers (1996 film) =

- Film poster
- Directed by: Ernie Fritz
- Produced by: Jon Landau; Barbara Carr; Jack Gulick; Ernie Fritz; Lee Rolontz
- Starring: Bruce Springsteen; E Street Band; Jon Landau
- Cinematography: Ernie Fritz
- Edited by: Ernie Fritz; Kathy Dougherty
- Music by: Bruce Springsteen "High Hopes" written by Tim Scott McConnell
- Distributed by: Columbia Music Video
- Release date: March 3, 1996
- Running time: 90 minutes
- Country: United States
- Language: English

Blood Brothers is a 1996 documentary film directed by filmmaker Ernie Fritz that chronicles the brief reunion of Bruce Springsteen and the E Street Band in 1995.

In 1989, Springsteen had decided that he wanted to explore working with a different set of musicians and he placed the E Street Band on indefinite hiatus. Between 1989 and 1995, he recorded and toured with other musicians. In 1995, Springsteen decided to reconvene the E Street Band for a week of recording sessions as well as a couple of promotional concert appearances in New York City. The recordings were to add a few new tracks to Springsteen's upcoming Greatest Hits release. After the brief reunion, Springsteen went on his own way again. The next reunion was not until 1999's Reunion Tour and 2002's The Rising album.

Fritz documented the entire reunion, capturing Springsteen and manager/producer Jon Landau deciding what songs to put on the Greatest Hits album, working on the arrangement of the new songs, the recording sessions themselves, and the performances at the promotional shows.

Blood Brothers premiered on March 3, 1996 on the Disney Channel. It was released on Laserdisc on October 1, 1996, on VHS on November 19, 1996 (with the Blood Brothers EP in CD form), and on DVD on January 16, 2001.

Critical reaction to Blood Brothers was positive. TV Guide called it "superlative ... more than a record of a legendary band's reunion. It offers a glimpse of Springsteen that fans rarely see." In 1997, the film was nominated for a Grammy Award for "Best Music Video, Long Form", losing to The Beatles Anthology.
