= High Hopes (album) =

Studio album by Bruce Springsteen
- Released: January 14, 2014
- Recorded: March–June 2013
- Studios: Thrill Hill; Thrill Hill West; Stone Hill Studio; Southern Tracks Recording Studio; Studios 301
- Genre: Rock
- Length: 56:24
- Label: Columbia
- Producers: Ron Aniello, Brendan O'Brien, Bruce Springsteen

Bruce Springsteen chronology
Collection: 1973–2012 (2013)	High Hopes (2014)	American Beauty (2014)

Bruce Springsteen and the E Street Band chronology
Collection: 1973–2012 (2013)	High Hopes (2014)	American Beauty (2014)

Singles from High Hopes
- 1. "High Hopes" Released: November 25, 2013; 2. "Just Like Fire Would" Released: January 22, 2014

High Hopes is the eighteenth studio album by the American singer-songwriter Bruce Springsteen, released on January 14, 2014, by Columbia Records. It went to the top of the charts in eleven countries, and was Springsteen's eleventh No. 1 album in the United States, a record surpassed only by the Beatles and Jay-Z. It was his tenth No. 1 in the UK putting him on par with the Rolling Stones and U2. Rolling Stone named it the second-best album of 2014.

The album is a collection of cover songs, out-takes and re-imagined versions of tracks from past albums, EPs and tours. Springsteen's regular backing band, the E Street Band, perform along with guitarist Tom Morello. Contributions from deceased members Clarence Clemons and Danny Federici also feature.

== Background ==
Springsteen said that the new music was "some of our best unreleased material from the past decade" and among his best writing and deserved a proper studio recording. Work on the album started on December 9, 2012, when Springsteen called producer Ron Aniello to discuss some unfinished demos of older songs. Aniello began production on the album in Los Angeles while the band continued the Wrecking Ball Tour. Aniello said that Springsteen "was gone most of the time, so we weren't able to sit in a room and sort it all out" and that it "took the most part of a year for him to figure it out". In March 2013, the day before Springsteen flew to Australia to resume touring, he went to Los Angeles, where he and Aniello did mixes, and Springsteen posed for the album pictures. Springsteen was "working his ass off, just working his ass off", Aniello recalled. "I've never seen someone his age work like that. He put in a 15-hour day in the studio." While in Australia, with Tom Morello replacing Steven Van Zandt—who was off filming Lilyhammer—the band spent its off time recording new music, with no specific plans for a new album. Aniello said recording in Australia was a spontaneous decision that was possible because recording engineer Nick DiDia was there to work with the band. More recording took place at various studios around the US, including Springsteen's personal home studio in New Jersey, Atlanta, New York City and Nashville. While many critics found that the album lacked the cohesion typical of Springsteen's releases, Aniello insisted that Springsteen went "back and forth with sequences for months and months until he [got] it exactly where he [wanted] it." "We recorded a lot and at first it was a much longer record. Bruce did the same thing with Wrecking Ball", he recalled.

== Songs ==
High Hopes was Springsteen's first studio album composed entirely of covers, outtakes and reimagined versions of songs from past albums and tours. "The best way to describe this record," Springsteen said, "is that's it's a bit of an anomaly but not much. I don't really work linearly like a lot of people do." The title track was the album's first single, and was originally recorded in 1995 and released on the Blood Brothers EP the following year. According to Springsteen, Morello suggested they perform the song during the Wrecking Ball Tour, which ultimately led to it being re-recorded. "American Skin (41 Shots)" was originally written in 2000 in response to the death of Amadou Diallo. A live version was released on Live in New York City while the studio version was released on a rare promo CD. During the Wrecking Ball Tour, Springsteen started to perform the song again as a tribute to Trayvon Martin. "The Ghost of Tom Joad" was the first single from the 1995 album of the same name and had been performed many times, often featuring Morello on guitar and trading vocals with Springsteen. The track had also been covered by Morello's former band, Rage Against the Machine, in a 1997 video, and later appeared on their album Renegades.

"Harry's Place" was written in 2001 for The Rising; "Heaven's Wall", "Down in the Hole" and "Hunter of Invisible Game" date from 2002 to 2008. Springsteen wrote "The Wall" around 1998 based on an idea from Joe Grushecky. It tells the story of Springsteen's visit to the Vietnam Veterans Memorial in Washington, D.C., and memories of Walter Cichon, a New Jersey musician who did not return home from the war. "Walter was one of the great early Jersey Shore rockers, who along with his brother Ray (one of my early guitar mentors) led the Motifs. The Motifs were a local rock band who were always a head above everybody else. Raw, sexy and rebellious, they were the heroes you aspired to be", Springsteen explained. Morello also suggested two covers. "Just Like Fire Would", by Australian punk rock band The Saints, and "Dream Baby Dream" by protopunk band Suicide. A version of the latter was released in September 2013 as a music video tribute to the fans who attended the Wrecking Ball Tour. In 2005, Springsteen closed out shows on his solo Devils & Dust Tour performing the song on a pump organ.

"Cold Spot", "Hey, Blue Eyes", "American Beauty" and "Mary, Mary" were among the 20 songs recorded that did not make the final cut, some of which were released on the American Beauty EP.

== Release and promotion ==
The album was preceded by the single "High Hopes". A music video for "Just Like Fire Would" was released January 22, 2014. A music video for "The Wall" was aired during the 2014 HBO special, Bruce Springsteen's High Hopes. On July 9, 2014, Springsteen released a short film for "Hunter of Invisible Game" which marked his directorial debut. In April 2014, Springsteen released American Beauty, a four-track EP of songs that did not make the final cut of High Hopes.

On December 28, 2013, Amazon.com made the album available for purchase as individual MP3 files through their mobile application. Amazon quickly removed the files, but it was too late and the album leaked by mid-day.

On January 12, 2014, the television series The Good Wife featured snippets of three songs ("High Hopes", "Hunter of Invisible Game" and "The Ghost of Tom Joad") during the episode. Usage of Springsteen's songs was part of a deal between his label and the CBS television network to gain wider exposure for the album in an unconventional way and lure his baby boomer fans to the show and the network's website. Springsteen said, "This is music I always felt needed to be released. I felt they all deserved a home and a hearing" in a statement discussing the CBS deal.

On January 14, 2014, the entire episode of Late Night with Jimmy Fallon was dedicated to Springsteen. Springsteen and the E Street Band, with Tom Morello but without Steven Van Zandt (who was filming Lilyhammer), performed "High Hopes", "Heaven's Wall" and "Just Like Fire Would". The latter song was streamed online and was not shown on television. Springsteen and Fallon, both dressed as Springsteen from the Born in the U.S.A. era, performed a parody song to the theme of "Born to Run" titled "Gov. Christie Traffic Jam", poking fun at the Fort Lee lane closure scandal. Springsteen was also interviewed.

On April 4, 2014, HBO aired Bruce Springsteen's High Hopes, a 30-minute documentary on the making of High Hopes. In May 2014, Sony Music Netherlands released a 45-minute documentary to YouTube titled High Hopes in South Africa which documented Springsteen and the E Street Band's first-ever concerts in South Africa.

== Critical reception ==
Professional ratings
Aggregate scores
Source	Rating
AnyDecentMusic?	6.4/10
Metacritic	67/100
Review scores
Source	Rating
AllMusic	3.5/5 stars
The A.V. Club	C+
Chicago Tribune	2/4 stars
Entertainment Weekly	B
The Guardian	3/5 stars
The Independent	4/5 stars
NME	8/10
Pitchfork	4.0/10
Rolling Stone	4.5/5 stars
Slant	3/5 stars

High Hopes got a mixed reception from critics, with Metacritic giving it 67 / 100, based upon 37 reviews, a "generally favorable" response. Stephen Thomas Erlewine of AllMusic wrote that "it's rather thrilling to hear Springsteen revel in a mess of contradictions", as the "songs don't cohere into a mood or narrative", a contrast to Springsteen's "two decades of deliberate, purposeful albums". At Rolling Stone, David Fricke found that the "cumulative effect of this mass of old, borrowed, blue...is retrospect with a cutting edge". For Kyle Anderson of Entertainment Weekly it "crackles with immediacy, despite the cobbled-together nature of the material." At The Independent, Andy Gill also noted the lack of "thematic unity" but lauded how "Tom Morello has re-invigorated old material".

A rave review in NME proclaimed, "Still The Boss". Greg Kot of the Chicago Tribune noted "the singer's desire to update his sound", and praised "Just Like Fire Would", "Hunter of Invisible Game", and "The Wall", but described the album as "otherwise ho-hum". At The A.V. Club, David Anthony said that "Springsteen splashes his brightest colors against a canvas, crosses his fingers, and hopes they mesh." Jessica Hopper of Spin said that "the small tragedy of the uneven High Hopes [is] that it doesn't play like a Springsteen album." At Pitchfork, Stephen M. Deusner noted that "the thick arrangements distract from the good songwriting and conceal the bad".

PopMatters concluded that there "isn’t a lack of strong songs — there are plenty here. Rather, it’s the unusual surfeit of so-so songs that undercuts the album" which "lacks a sorely missed sense of scope and unity".

Jesse Cataldo of Slant Magazine saw Springsteen "[aligning] himself with a long tradition of folksingers" in tuning into "the deeper inequalities that inspire" the songs. At The Guardian, Ian Gittins saw the album as a stopgap, but "one assembled with tender, loving care." USA Today's Edna Gundersen's review ran under the headline, "Grab-bag material could hurt Springsteen's 'High Hopes'". It quoted Billboard magazine's Keith Caulfield who said, "Wrecking Ball did 196,000 its first week. It's safe to say this won't do that. But anything Bruce puts out sells respectably." Gundersen also reported Caulfield saying, of Springsteen's decision to allow his music to be used for The Good Wife, "He's doing what everyone's doing, reaching consumers that are going to buy their music."

In December 2014, Rolling Stone named High Hopes the second best album (behind only U2's Songs of Innocence) on their Top 50 Albums of 2014 list.

== Commercial performance ==
The album debuted at No. 1 on the Billboard 200 album chart on its first week of release, Springsteen's eleventh No. 1 and placing him third on the acts with the most No.1's behind the Beatles (with 19 No. 1s) and Jay-Z (with 13). The album sold around 99,000 copies in the US in its first week, and as of October 2015 had sold 213,000. The album also debuted at No. 1 in the UK, his tenth time to top that chart.

== Track listing ==
All tracks are written by Bruce Springsteen, except where noted.

No.	Title	Writer(s)	Length
1.	"High Hopes"	Tim Scott McConnell	4:57
2.	"Harry's Place"		4:04
3.	"American Skin (41 Shots)"		7:23
4.	"Just Like Fire Would"	Chris Bailey	3:56
5.	"Down in the Hole"		4:59
6.	"Heaven's Wall"		3:50
7.	"Frankie Fell in Love"		2:48
8.	"This Is Your Sword"		2:52
9.	"Hunter of Invisible Game"		4:42
10.	"The Ghost of Tom Joad"		7:33
11.	"The Wall"	Bruce Springsteen, Joe Grushecky (idea of song)	4:20
12.	"Dream Baby Dream"	Martin Rev, Alan Vega	5:00

Notes

- The album was also released on 180-gram vinyl as a double LP. The CD version of the album also came packaged with the LP.
- The deluxe version of the album included a limited edition DVD titled Born in the U.S.A. Live: London 2013, featuring the band performing the entire Born in the U.S.A. album in London, England, during the Wrecking Ball World Tour.

== Personnel ==
Adapted from the album's liner notes:

- Bruce Springsteen – lead vocals (all tracks), guitar (all tracks), mandolin (tracks 7, 8, 12), banjo (track 8), additional bass guitar (track 6), drums (track 11), vibraphone (track 1), percussion (tracks 1, 3, 7), percussion loop (track 6), synthesizers (tracks 6, 8, 12), organ (tracks 6, 7), piano (tracks 8, 12), harmonium (track 12)
- Roy Bittan – piano (tracks 1–4, 7, 8, 10–12), organ (track 8)
- Clarence Clemons – tenor saxophone (tracks 2, 5)
- Danny Federici – organ (tracks 5, 11)
- Nils Lofgren – guitar (tracks 1, 2, 4, 11), pedal steel (track 10), mandolin (track 10), backing vocals (track 3)
- Patti Scialfa – backing vocals (tracks 1, 3–6, 8, 11)
- Garry Tallent – bass guitar (tracks 1, 2, 4–6, 9, 11)
- Steven Van Zandt – guitar (track 3), backing vocals (tracks 3, 4, 7, 8)
- Max Weinberg – drums (except tracks 8 and 11), percussion (track 11)
- Tom Morello – guitar (tracks 1, 2, 4, 9, 10, 12), lead guitar (tracks 3, 6), lead vocals (track 10), backing vocals (track 3)
- Charles Giordano – organ (tracks 3, 4), accordion (tracks 1, 10)
- Ron Aniello – guitar (tracks 3, 7, 8, 12), 12-string guitar (track 4), bass guitar (tracks 3, 7, 8, 10, 12), drum loop (tracks 1, 3), vibraphone (track 3), percussion (track 3), percussion loop (tracks 6, 12), synthesizers (tracks 3, 6, 8, 10–12), organ (track 3), farfisa organ (track 6), accordion (track 11),
- Soozie Tyrell – violin (tracks 5, 10), additional violin (track 9), backing vocals (tracks 1, 3, 6, 8)
- Sam Bardfeld – violin (tracks 6–8)
- Jake Clemons – tenor saxophone solo (track 3), horns (track 4)
- Barry Danielian – horns (tracks 1, 3, 4, 12)
- Clark Gayton – horns (tracks 1, 3, 4, 12)
- Stan Harrison – horns (tracks 1, 3, 12)
- Ed Manion – horns (tracks 1, 3, 4, 12)
- Curt Ramm – horns (tracks 1, 3, 4, 12), cornet (track 11)
- Scott Tibbs – horn orchestration (track 3)
- Jeff Kievit – piccolo trumpet (track 4)
- Cillian Vallely – uilleann pipes, low whistle, tin whistle (track 8)
- Josh Freese – drums (track 8)
- Everett Bradley – percussion (tracks 1, 4, 6), backing vocals (tracks 1, 4)
- Curtis King – backing vocals (tracks 1, 3, 4, 6)
- Cindy Mizelle – backing vocals (tracks 1, 3, 4, 6)
- Michelle Moore – backing vocals (tracks 1, 4)
- Evan Springsteen – backing vocals (track 5)
- Jessica Springsteen – backing vocals (track 5)
- Samuel Springsteen – backing vocals (track 5)
- Tawatha Agee – backing vocals (track 6)
- Keith Fluitt – backing vocals (track 6)
- John James – backing vocals (track 6)
- Al Thornton – backing vocals (track 6)
- Brenda White – backing vocals (track 6)
- Atlanta Strings (tracks 2, 9):
  - Ed Horst – string arrangement, conductor
  - Justin Bruns, Jay Christy, Sheela Iyengar, John Meisner, Christopher Pulgram, William Pu, Olga Shpitko, Kenn Wagner – violins
  - Amy Chang, Tania Maxwell, Lachlan McBane – violas
  - Karen Freer, Charae Krueger, Daniel Laufer – celli
- NY Chamber Consort Strings (tracks 4, 6, 12):
  - Rob Mathes – string arrangement, conductor
  - Lisa Kim (concertmaster), Quan Ge, Hyunju Lee, Jessica Lee, Ann Lehman, Joanna Mauer, Suzanne Ornstein, Annaliesa Place, David Southorn, Jeannie Wynton, Sharon Yamada – violins
  - Maurycy Banaszek, Desiree Elsevier, Shmuel Katz, Robert Rinehart – violas
  - Maria Kitsopoulos, Alan Stepansky, Ru Pei Yeh – celli

Technical

- Ron Aniello, Bruce Springsteen – production (tracks 1, 3, 4, 7, 8, 10–12), co-production (track 6)
- Brendan O'Brien – production (tracks 2, 5, 6, 9)
- Ross Petersen, Toby Scott, Nick DiDia – recording engineering
- Rob Lebret, Kevin Mills, Geoff Sanoff, Bob Clearmountain, Dave Schiffman – additional recording
- Bob Clearmountain – mixing
  - Brandon Duncan, Sergio Ruelas Jr., Chris Lord-Alge – assistants (tracks 4, 6, 9, 11, 12)
  - Nik Karpen, Keith Armstrong, Brad Townsend, Andrew Schubert – assistants (tracks 1–3, 7, 8, 10)
- Brendan O'Brien – mixing (track 5)
  - Tom Syrowski, Karl Egsieker, Tom Tapley – assistants
- Bob Ludwig – mastering
- Karl Egsieker, Tom Tapley, Brendan Dekora, Alex Williams, Sean Astill, Tom Astill, Jordan Power, Jack Prest, Luke Yeoman, Daniel Zaidenstadt, Benjamin Rice, Phil Joly, John Horne, Joe Viscano, Mike Bauer, Ted Tuthill, Owen Mulholland – engineering assistants
- Kyle Hoffman, Brandon Duncan – assistants
- Billy Bowers – Pro Tools
- Toby Scott – production coordination
- Shari Sutcliffe – musician contractor
- Sandra Park, Patricia Horst – strings contractor
- Kevin Buell – guitars and technical services
- Michelle Holme – art direction, design
- Danny Clinch – photography
  - Edward Smith, Nyra Lang – assistants

== Charts ==
=== Weekly charts ===
Weekly chart performance for High Hopes
Chart (2014)	Peak position
Australian Albums (ARIA)	1
Austrian Albums (Ö3 Austria)	2
Belgian Albums (Ultratop Flanders)	1
Belgian Albums (Ultratop Wallonia)	2
Canadian Albums (Billboard)	1
Danish Albums (Hitlisten)	1
Dutch Albums (Album Top 100)	1
Finnish Albums (Suomen virallinen lista)	1
French Albums (SNEP)	2
German Albums (Offizielle Top 100)	1
Greek Albums (IFPI)	1
Hungarian Albums (MAHASZ)	12
Irish Albums (IRMA)	1
Italian Albums (FIMI)	1
Japanese Albums (Oricon)	8
New Zealand Albums (RMNZ)	1
Norwegian Albums (VG-lista)	1
Polish Albums (ZPAV)	6
Portuguese Albums (AFP)	4
Scottish Albums (Official Charts)	1
South African Albums (RISA)	6
Spanish Albums (Promusicae)	1
Swedish Albums (Sverigetopplistan)	1
Swiss Albums (Schweizer Hitparade)	1
UK Albums (Official Charts)	1
US Billboard 200	1
US Top Rock Albums (Billboard)	1

=== Year-end charts ===
Year-end chart performance for High Hopes
Chart (2014)	Position
Australian Albums (ARIA)	39
Austrian Albums (Ö3 Austria)	33
Belgian Albums (Ultratop Flanders)	21
Belgian Albums (Ultratop Wallonia)	58
Dutch Albums (Album Top 100)	22
German Albums (Offizielle Top 100)	40
Italian Albums (FIMI)	24
New Zealand Albums (RMNZ)	20
Spanish Albums (PROMUSICAE)	30
Swedish Albums (Sverigetopplistan)	25
Swiss Albums (Schweizer Hitparade)	21
UK Albums (OCC)	67
US Billboard 200	101
US Top Rock Albums (Billboard)	21

== Certifications ==
Certifications and sales for High Hopes
Region	Certification	Certified units/sales
Australia (ARIA)	Gold	35,000^{^}
Austria (IFPI Austria)	Gold	7,500^{*}
France (SNEP)	Gold	50,000^{*}
Germany (BVMI)	Gold	100,000^{^}
Italy (FIMI)	Platinum	50,000^{*}
New Zealand (RMNZ)	Gold	7,500^{^}
Spain (Promusicae)	Gold	20,000^{^}
Sweden (GLF)	Gold	20,000^{‡}
Switzerland (IFPI Switzerland)	Gold	10,000^{^}
United Kingdom (BPI)	Gold	100,000^{*}
^{*} Sales figures based on certification alone.^{^} Shipments figures based on certification alone.^{‡} Sales+streaming figures based on certification alone.
