= Sworn brother (disambiguation) =

Sworn brothers are males either siblings by birth or who have sworn loyalty to each other.

Sworn brother also refers to:

- Three Knights-Errant and Five Sworn Brothers, also translated as Three Heroes and Five Gallants, a novel based on Shi Yukun's plays about Bao Zheng, his subordinates and his allies
  - Little Five Sworn Brothers, also translated as Five Younger Gallants, a sequel of the novel above
- Sworn Brothers, 1987 Hong Kong film
- Rebels, Rogues & Sworn Brothers, a Lucero album

== See also ==
- Blood Brothers (disambiguation)
