= Blood Sisters (novel) =

2005 book

- First edition
- Author: Barbara Keating & Stephanie Keating
- Language: English
- Genre: Novel
- Publisher: Harvill Press
- Publication date: 6 October 2005
- Publication place: United Kingdom
- Media type: Print (Paperback)
- Pages: 608 pp
- ISBN: 1-84343-275-7
- OCLC: 62760061
- Followed by: A Durable Fire

Blood Sisters is a 2005 book by Barbara and Stephanie Keating. The book follows the lives of three girls through their early lives in Kenya to their later lives, each of which go into different directions.

== Synopsis ==
The novel concerns the life stories of three girls: the Irish Sarah Mackay, an Afrikaner Hanna Van der Beer and British Camilla Broughton Smith. The book follows their journey from being brought up in Kenya, until their lives diverge and their hopes and dreams are destroyed, and their bond almost with it.

== Publication ==
Blood Sisters was first published in paperback format in the United Kingdom on 6 October 2005 through Harvill Press. This was followed by an ebook publication in 2006 through Vintage.

The novel has been translated to multiple languages that include German, Turkish, and Italian.

== Trilogy ==
It is the first volume of the Langani Trilogy, followed by A Durable Fire (2007, ISBN 978-0099501695) and In Borrowed Light (2011, ISBN 978-0099520634).

== Reception ==
RTÉ's reviewer described it as "A fat, juicy, escapist read" which "captures the intoxicating beauty of Kenya and the danger that pulls all three girls back", while a reviewer in the South African Independent Online said "Sentimental nonsense. Stay away."
