= American Beauty (EP) =

EP by Bruce Springsteen
- Released: April 19, 2014
- Recorded: October 2013
- Genre: Rock; heartland rock; roots rock; power pop
- Length: 14:44
- Label: Columbia
- Producer: Ron Aniello, Bruce Springsteen, Brendan O'Brien ("Hey Blue Eyes")

Bruce Springsteen chronology
| High Hopes (2014) | American Beauty (2014) | The Album Collection Vol. 1 1973–1984 (2014) |

Bruce Springsteen and the E Street Band chronology
| High Hopes (2014) | American Beauty (2014) | The Album Collection Vol. 1 1973–1984 (2014) |

American Beauty is a four-song EP by Bruce Springsteen that was released on limited edition (7,500 copies) 12-inch vinyl exclusively for Record Store Day on April 19, 2014. A digital download version was also released on April 22, 2014. The four songs that appeared on the EP are outtakes from Springsteen's 2014 album High Hopes. Springsteen said of the four songs, "they're just good music that didn't get onto this record, and was sitting there. I thought it's a nice time to support the record stores, which are dwindling and get some new music out at the same time."

On April 22, 2014, Springsteen released a music video for the song "American Beauty" which was shot prior to his show on April 19, 2014, in Charlotte, North Carolina.

== Background ==
Springsteen had around 20 songs recorded during the High Hopes sessions that failed to make the final cut. Springsteen decided to go back with producer Ron Aniello and work on the music so they could give it a proper release. The EP's title track, "American Beauty", is a song left over from the demo tracks Springsteen didn't end up recording with producer Brendan O'Brien. Springsteen describes the song as "Exile meets E Street" and as being a song where he sings in a range he often doesn't visit. "Hurry Up Sundown", "a fun piece of modern power pop" according to Springsteen, was another demo track originally recorded with O'Brien. "Mary Mary" and "Hey Blue Eyes" were recorded during the Magic and Working on a Dream sessions, respectively. Springsteen said of "Mary Mary" that the song is "a lovely mystery, a small piece of heartbreak poetry that sneaks up on you with its slippery groove, punctuated string section and spectral lyrics". It was the closest of the four songs to making the High Hopes album. "Hey Blue Eyes" is one of Springsteen's darkest political songs. "Written during the Bush years, it’s a metaphor for the house of horrors our government’s actions created in the years following the invasion of Iraq. At its center is the repressed sexuality and abuse of power that characterized Abu Ghraib prison. I feel this is a shadow we as a country have yet to emerge from." Springsteen said. Tom Morello, who is featured prominently on High Hopes and its supporting tour with Springsteen, plans on covering "Hey Blue Eyes" for an upcoming project.

== Track listing ==
All tracks are written by Bruce Springsteen.

| No. | Title | Length |
|---|---|---|
| 1. | "American Beauty" | 4:06 |
| 2. | "Mary Mary" | 2:48 |
| 3. | "Hurry Up Sundown" | 3:17 |
| 4. | "Hey Blue Eyes" | 4:33 |

== Personnel ==
- Bruce Springsteen – lead vocals (tracks 1–4), background vocals (tracks 1, 3), 6-string acoustic guitar (tracks 1–4), 12-string acoustic guitar (track 1), electric guitar (tracks 1, 3), slide guitar (track 1), bass (tracks 2, 3), keyboards (tracks 1, 3), synth (track 2), pump organ (track 2), piano (track 3), organ (track 4), tambourine (track 1), percussion (tracks 2–4), glockenspiel (track 3)
- Roy Bittan – piano (track 4)
- Nils Lofgren – guitar (track 4), pedal steel guitar (track 4)
- Patti Scialfa – background vocals (tracks 2, 4)
- Garry Tallent – bass (track 4)
- Max Weinberg – drums (track 4)
- Charles Giordano – organ (track 1), farfisa organ (track 2)
- Soozie Tyrell – fiddle (track 4)
- Ron Aniello – bass (track 1), additional piano (track 1), synth (track 2)
- Josh Freese – drums (tracks 1, 3), timpani (track 1)
- Songa Lee – violin (track 2)
- Steve Richards – cello (track 2)
- Toby Scott – drum programming (track 2)
- Scott Tibbs – string arrangement and conductor (track 2)
- Patrick Warren – keyboards (track 4)

Technical

- Ron Aniello, Bruce Springsteen – production (tracks 1–3)
- Brendan O'Brien – production (track 4)
- Rob Lebret, Ross Petersen, Toby Scott – engineering (tracks 1–3)
- Dave Schiffman – drums engineering (tracks 1, 3), strings engineering (track 2)
  - Brendan DeKora – assistant
- Nick DiDia – engineering (track 4)
  - Tom Tapley – assistant
- Chris Lord-Alge – mixing (tracks 1, 3)
  - Andrew Schubert, Brad Townsend, Keith Armstrong, Nik Karpen – assistants
- Bob Clearmountain – mixing (track 2)
  - Sergio Ruelas Jr. – assistant
- Brendan O'Brien – mixing (track 4)
  - Nick DiDia, Tom Tapley – assistants
- Bob Ludwig – mastering
- Chris Bellman – vinyl cutting engineer
- Toby Scott – production coordination
- Shari Sutcliffe – musician contractor
- Kevin Buell – guitars and technical services
- Michelle Holme – art direction, design

== Chart performance ==
| Chart (2014) | Peak position |
|---|---|
| Spain (Promusicae) | 28 |
