= San Diego Blood Sisters =

Activist organization

- Formation: 1983
- Dissolved: 1993
- Purpose: HIV/AIDS
- Location: United States
- Key people: Wendy Sue Biegeleisen; Nicolette Ibarra; Barbara Vick

The San Diego Blood Sisters were an organization formed in 1983 in San Diego, California, by members of the Women's Caucus of the San Diego Democratic Club. Their purpose was to organize and sponsor lesbian blood drives in response to the AIDS epidemic. The Blood Sisters aimed to increase the blood supply for AIDS patients, many of whom were gay men requiring transfusions due to conditions like anemia. The organization operated until its gradual dissolution after 1993. The Blood Sisters' efforts faced frequent opposition, disruption, and cancellations from those concerned about the safety of the blood supply. Key figures included founding members Wendy Sue Biegeleisen, Nicolette Ibarra, and Barbara Vick.

== Formation ==
The San Diego Blood Sisters began organizing blood drives in response to the 1983 ban on blood donations from gay men in the United States. This ban was implemented despite a national blood shortage exacerbated by the epidemic. While gay men were prohibited from donating, lesbians were still permitted. This allowed the Blood Sisters to counteract the ban by hosting drives, providing HIV patients with blood transfusions necessary to treat anemia caused by the infection.

The group held its first blood drive on July 16, 1983, organized by founding members Wendy Sue Biegeleisen, Nicolette Ibarra, and Barbara Vick. It took place at the San Diego Blood Bank in Hillcrest, where nearly 200 women volunteered, resulting in approximately 130 donations.

== Backlash ==
=== National Gay Task Force 1984 Award ===
In spring 1984, the Blood Sisters received an award from the National Gay Task Force. This recognition prompted backlash from conservative groups who demanded that Edward Brandt, the Assistant Secretary of Health, be dismissed if he attended the award ceremony.

=== Orange County Blood Drive ===
On December 27, 1984, a Blood Sisters-organized drive scheduled for December 30 was cancelled due to anticipated public backlash. Dr. Benjamin Spindler, the medical director for the Orange County Red Cross chapter, cancelled the drive after learning of it in a newspaper and receiving a complaint. The Red Cross was concerned that if a blood drive was held at a gay community center, the public might believe donations were being accepted from gay men. The head of the greater Los Angeles-Orange County region chapter endorsed this decision, stating that the scheduling of the drive was an error made by an "inexperienced" employee.

This was not the first instance of lesbian blood drives facing opposition in Los Angeles; two previous drives had been denied bloodmobiles by the Red Cross because they were planned at the gay community center.

== Dissolution and legacy ==
The San Diego Blood Sisters actively operated for about four years before their organized efforts significantly decreased. Members generally attribute the organization's decline to President Ronald Reagan's eventual intervention in the AIDS crisis.

In addition to the medical community's concerns about public reaction to lesbian-sponsored blood drives, increased advocacy for AIDS patients also reduced the perceived need for the Blood Sisters' drives. Between 1983 and 1992, the Blood Sisters hosted twelve blood drives. The organization was dissolved in 1993.

In 1994, an initiative called the San Diego Lesbian Community Blood Drive attempted to restart the movement begun by the Blood Sisters but was unsuccessful. The San Diego Blood Bank, which had previously supported the Blood Sisters, became a primary obstacle to this new effort, taking issue with the proposed use of the word "lesbian" in the new organization's advertising. Many members of the San Diego Lesbian Community Blood Drive, some of whom were former Blood Sisters, sought legal intervention. The new group attempted to work with the San Diego Human Rights Commission to challenge the blood bank's decision but were unable to make progress.

In 1996, Delores Jacobs, then director of the San Diego LGBT Community Center, published an opinion piece alongside an anonymous article in San Diego Gay News. Both articles advocated for all members of the LGBTQ community to refuse blood donation until the San Diego Blood Bank stopped enforcing the FDA's ban on blood donation by men who have sex with men. Despite attempts to revive the Blood Sisters' work, these articles shifted local lesbian activism from organizing group blood drives towards encouraging outright refusal to donate blood, even individually.
