= 57 Channels (And Nothin' On) =

Song by Bruce Springsteen

Single by Bruce Springsteen

from the album Human Touch
- B-side: "Part Man, Part Monkey" (US); "Stand on It" (UK)
- Released: June 1992
- Genre: Rockabilly
- Length: 2:28
- Label: Columbia
- Songwriter: Bruce Springsteen
- Producers: Bruce Springsteen; Jon Landau; Chuck Plotkin; Roy Bittan

Bruce Springsteen singles chronology
"Better Days" (1992)	"57 Channels (And Nothin' On)" (1992)	"If I Should Fall Behind" (1992)

Music video
- 57 Channels (And Nothin' On) on Youtube.com

"57 Channels (And Nothin' On)" is a song written and performed by American musician Bruce Springsteen, appearing on his ninth album, Human Touch (1992). The song was released as a single in June 1992 by Columbia Records, charting in the top 100 in various countries. A video for the song was also released. The title is a reference to cable television, which carries more channels than terrestrial television.

== Music video ==
The accompanying music video for "57 Channels (And Nothin' On)" illustrates the song's narrative, culminating in a recreation of Ant Farm's infamous 1975 "Media Burn" stunt, wherein a speeding car crashes through a pyramid of television sets. The same art collective was also responsible for Cadillac Ranch, immortalized in the Bruce Springsteen song of the same name (from The River). Springsteen also plays a bass, which he also played in the recording.

In a September 2014 post on Facebook discussing the video, Springsteen wrote, "Shot back in the quaint days of only 57 channels and no flat screen TVs, I have no idea what we were aiming for in this one outside of some vague sense of 'hipness' and an attempt at irony. Never my strong suit, it reads now to me as a break from our usual approach and kind of a playful misfire."

== Personnel ==
According to authors Philippe Margotin and Jean-Michel Guesdon:

- Bruce Springsteen – vocals, bass
- Jeff Porcaro – drums, percussion
- Roy Bittan – keyboards

== Charts ==
Weekly chart performance for "57 Channels (And Nothin' On)"
Chart (1992)	Peak position
Australia (ARIA)	107
Canada Top Singles (RPM)	25
Europe (Eurochart Hot 100)	40
Ireland (IRMA)	26
Italy (Musica e dischi)	18
Netherlands (Dutch Top 40)	29
Netherlands (Single Top 100)	39
Norway (VG-lista)	9
Quebec (ADISQ)	46
Sweden (Sverigetopplistan)	32
UK Singles (Official Charts)	32
UK Airplay (Music Week)	20
US Billboard Hot 100	68
US Mainstream Rock Airplay (Billboard)	6
US Cash Box Top 100	62

== Release history ==
Region	Version	Date	Format(s)	Label(s)	Ref.
United States	Original	June 1992	7-inch vinyl; 12-inch vinyl; CD; cassette	Columbia	
Japan	Original	June 25, 1992	Mini-CD	Sony	
Australia	Original	June 29, 1992	CD; cassette	Columbia	
United Kingdom	Original	July 13, 1992	7-inch vinyl; CD1; cassette	Columbia	
United Kingdom	Original	July 20, 1992	CD2	Columbia	
Australia	Remixes	August 3, 1992	CD; cassette	Columbia	
Japan	Remixes	August 22, 1992	Maxi-CD	Sony	
