= Human Touch =

Studio album by Bruce Springsteen
- Released: March 27, 1992
- Recorded: September 1989 – March 1991
- Studios: A&M; Soundworks West; Ocean Way Recording; Westlake Recording Studios; Record Plant (Los Angeles)
- Genres: Rock; pop
- Length: 58:49
- Label: Columbia
- Producers: Bruce Springsteen, Jon Landau, Chuck Plotkin, Roy Bittan

Bruce Springsteen chronology
Chimes of Freedom (1988)	Human Touch (1992)	Lucky Town (1992)

Singles from Human Touch
- 1. "Human Touch" Released: March 1992; 2. "57 Channels (And Nothin' On)" Released: June 1992; 3. "Roll of the Dice" Released: November 1992 (Japan)

Human Touch is the ninth studio album by American singer-songwriter Bruce Springsteen. The album was released on March 27, 1992, the same day as Lucky Town. It was the more popular of the two albums, peaking at number two on the US Billboard 200 chart. Its lead single, "Human Touch" (released as a double A-side single with Lucky Town's "Better Days"), peaked at number one on the Mainstream Rock chart and number 16 on the Billboard Hot 100. Human Touch has since been certified Platinum by the Recording Industry Association of America (RIAA) for sales of over one million copies in the US, and it was nominated for Best Rock Vocal Performance at the 1993 Grammy Awards.

== Background ==
Shortly after Springsteen disbanded the E Street Band in October 1989, pianist Roy Bittan played three instrumental tracks he had written for Springsteen: "Roll of the Dice", "Real World", and "Trouble in Paradise". Springsteen later added lyrics to the compositions and liked them enough to begin writing and recording additional material. With the E Street Band dissolved—aside from Bittan, who played keyboards and co-produced the album—Springsteen assembled a group of studio musicians in Los Angeles, primarily utilizing bassist Randy Jackson and drummer Jeff Porcaro. A diverse group of background vocalists contributed to the project, including Sam Moore, Bobby Hatfield, and Bobby King. Ultimately, approximately 25 songs were recorded, though the exact number remains unknown.

The album was initially scheduled for a spring or summer 1991 release, after being pushed back from early 1991, but production was halted when Springsteen began recording Lucky Town later that year. Springsteen ultimately decided to release both albums on the same day, resulting in Human Touch debuting on March 27, 1992—more than two years after the project commenced.

Springsteen asked Porcaro to join the touring band for the subsequent promotional tour, but Porcaro declined due to prior commitments with his own band, Toto. Porcaro died of a heart attack a few months later while working in his garden.

== Critical reception ==
Professional ratings
Review scores
Source	Rating
AllMusic	2/5 stars
Chicago Tribune	1/4 stars
Christgau's Consumer Guide	(1-star Honorable Mention)
Entertainment Weekly	B−
NME	5/10
Pitchfork	5.8/10
Rolling Stone	4/5 stars
Tom Hull	B−

Human Touch debuted and peaked at No. 2 on the Billboard 200, selling 246,000 copies during its first week. The album was met with generally mixed reviews. Rolling Stone awarded it four stars, noting that the songs "explore the movement from disenchanted isolation to a willingness to risk love and its attendant traumas again." The review also stated that the title track "stands among Springsteen's best work." Conversely, Bill Wyman of The Chicago Reader gave the album a harsh review, calling it "the worst piece of [expletive] you can imagine coming from a talent on Springsteen's level." Out of the album's 14 tracks, Wyman found only "one passable Springsteen song, 'The Long Goodbye.' The lyrics don't make much sense...but it has a bruising musical onslaught that covers up a lot."

Although his initial review was more favorable, Greg Kot of the Chicago Tribune later wrote that "in retrospect, Human Touch tried to re-create the stadium-rocking aura of an E Street album, with session musicians unsuccessfully replacing the road-tested band." AllMusic retrospectively described the album as "generic pop" and "his first that didn't at least aspire to greatness."

The album is generally unpopular among Springsteen's fanbase, and in 2012, it was ranked last among his discography by the online magazine Nerve. Addressing the cool reception of Human Touch and Lucky Town among fans, Springsteen remarked: "I tried it [writing happy songs] in the early '90s and it didn't work; the public didn't like it."

== Track listing ==
All music and lyrics by Bruce Springsteen, except where noted

No.	Title	Writer(s)	Length
1.	"Human Touch"		6:31
2.	"Soul Driver"		4:39
3.	"57 Channels (And Nothin' On)"		2:28
4.	"Cross My Heart"	Springsteen; Sonny Boy Williamson (lyrics)	3:51
5.	"Gloria's Eyes"		3:46
6.	"With Every Wish"		4:39
7.	"Roll of the Dice"	Springsteen; Roy Bittan	4:17
8.	"Real World"	Springsteen; Bittan	5:26
9.	"All or Nothin' at All"		3:23
10.	"Man's Job"		4:37
11.	"I Wish I Were Blind"		4:48
12.	"The Long Goodbye"		3:30
13.	"Real Man"		4:33
14.	"Pony Boy"	Traditional, arrangement and additional lyrics by Springsteen	2:14

=== Unreleased outtakes ===
Springsteen's first album without the E Street Band generated numerous outtakes, many of which were later released. A cover of "Viva Las Vegas" was issued as a B-side and included on The Essential Bruce Springsteen; "Chicken Lips and Lizard Hips" appeared on a children's compilation album; and "30 Days Out" served as another B-side. "Part Man, Part Monkey"—a track originally recorded during the Tunnel of Love sessions and performed on that tour—was re-recorded and released as a B-side and on Tracks. Other outtakes included on Tracks include "Trouble In Paradise", "Sad Eyes", "Leavin' Train", "Seven Angels", "My Lover Man", "When the Lights Go Out", "Over the Rise", "Goin' Cali", and "Loose Change". "Trouble River" was subsequently released on 18 Tracks. Springsteen also recorded "Red-Headed Woman", a live version of which eventually appeared on the MTV Unplugged album. Additionally, he recorded "Secret Garden", which was later re-worked with the reunited E Street Band in 1995 for Greatest Hits, and "All the Way Home", a song Springsteen gave to Southside Johnny that he would not release himself until 2005's Devils & Dust.

- "Red Headed Woman"
- "Secret Garden"
- "All the Way Home"

== Personnel ==
- Bruce Springsteen – guitar, vocals (all tracks), bass on "57 Channels (And Nothin' On)"

Additional musicians

- Randy Jackson – bass
- Jeff Porcaro – drums, percussion (except on "With Every Wish")
- Roy Bittan – keyboards
- Sam Moore – harmony vocals on "Soul Driver", "Real World", and "Man's Job"
- Patti Scialfa – harmony vocals on "Human Touch" and "Pony Boy"
- David Sancious – Hammond organ on "Soul Driver" and "Real Man"
- Ian McLagan – piano on "Real Man"
- Bobby King – backing vocals on "Roll of the Dice" and "Man's Job"
- Tim Pierce – second guitar on "Soul Driver" and "Roll of the Dice"
- Michael Fisher – percussion on "Soul Driver"
- Bobby Hatfield – harmony vocals on "I Wish I Were Blind"
- Mark Isham – muted trumpet on "With Every Wish"
- Douglas Lunn – bass on "With Every Wish"
- Kurt Wortman – drums and dumbeck on "With Every Wish"

Technical:

- Bruce Springsteen, Jon Landau, Chuck Plotkin, Roy Bittan – production
- Toby Scott – engineering
- Robert "RJ" Jaczko – additional engineering and assistant engineering
- Greg Goldman, Randy Wine, Tom Hardisty, Clif Norrell, Craig Johnson, Buzz Burrows – assistant engineering
- Scott Hull, Dave Collins – digital editing
- Bob Clearmountain – mixing
- Bob Ludwig – mastering
- Sandra Choron – art direction
- Victor Weaver – typography design
- David Rose – cover photography, interior photography
- Annie Leibovitz, Harry Gruyaert – interior photography

== Singles ==
Year	Single	Peak chart positions												
Year	Single	US	US Main	US AC	UK	IRE	GER	SWI	AUT	NOR	SWE	NZ	AUS	NL
1992	"Human Touch"^{[A]}	16	1	8	11	4	15	4	19	1	4	12	17	3
1992	"57 Channels (And Nothin' On)"	68	6	—	32	26	—	—	—	9	32	–	—	39

Singles were released in both U.S. and UK/Europe, unless otherwise indicated:

- A Charted as double A-Side with "Better Days" when released in the United States.

== Charts ==
=== Weekly charts ===
Chart (1992)	Peak position
Australian ARIA Albums Chart	3
Austrian Albums Chart	1
Canadian RPM Albums Chart	2
Dutch Albums Chart	3
European Albums (Music & Media)	1
French SNEP Albums Chart	3
German Media Control Albums Chart	3
Italian M&D Albums Chart	1
Japanese Oricon Albums Chart	4
New Zealand Albums Chart	5
Norwegian VG-lista Albums Chart	1
Spanish Albums Chart	1
Swedish Albums Chart	1
Swiss Albums Chart	1
UK Albums Chart	1
US Billboard 200	2
Zimbabwean Albums Chart	2

=== Year-end charts ===
Chart (1992)	Position
Austrian Albums Chart	21
Canada Top Albums/CDs (RPM)	21
French Albums Chart	51
Swiss Albums Chart	19
UK Albums Chart	67
US Billboard 200	48

== Certifications ==
Region	Certification	Certified units/sales
Australia (ARIA)	Platinum	70,000^{^}
Austria (IFPI Austria)	Gold	25,000^{*}
Canada (Music Canada)	2× Platinum	200,000^{^}
Finland (Musiikkituottajat)	Gold	35,627
Germany (BVMI)	Gold	250,000^{^}
Japan (RIAJ)	Gold	116,000
New Zealand (RMNZ)	Gold	7,500^{^}
Norway (IFPI Norway)	Gold	25,000^{*}
Spain (Promusicae)	Platinum	100,000^{^}
Sweden (GLF)	Platinum	100,000^{^}
Switzerland (IFPI Switzerland)	Platinum	50,000^{^}
United Kingdom (BPI)	Gold	100,000^{^}
United States (RIAA)	Platinum	1,168,000
^{*} Sales figures based on certification alone.^{^} Shipments figures based on certification alone.
