= Lucky Town =

Studio album by Bruce Springsteen
- Released: March 27, 1992
- Recorded: September 1991 – January 1992
- Studio: Thrill Hill (Colts Neck, New Jersey); A&M (Hollywood, California)
- Genre: Blues rock; country rock; heartland rock
- Length: 39:38
- Label: Columbia
- Producer: Bruce Springsteen, Jon Landau, Chuck Plotkin, Roy Bittan (Note: Additional production on "Leap of Faith", "The Big Muddy" and "Living Proof")

Bruce Springsteen chronology
Human Touch (1992)	Lucky Town (1992)	In Concert/MTV Plugged (1993)

Singles from Lucky Town
- 1. "Better Days" Released: March 9, 1992; 2. "Leap of Faith" Released: October 12, 1992; 3. "If I Should Fall Behind" Released: December 15, 1992; 4. "Lucky Town" Released: March 29, 1993

Lucky Town is the tenth studio album by American singer-songwriter Bruce Springsteen. The album was released on March 27, 1992, the same day as Springsteen's ninth studio album, Human Touch. Lucky Town peaked at number three on the Billboard 200, with its lead single "Better Days" (a double A-side single with Human Touch's title track) peaking at number one on the U.S. Mainstream Rock chart and number 16 on the Billboard Hot 100. Lucky Town has since been certified Platinum by the Recording Industry Association of America (RIAA) for selling more than one million copies in the United States.

== Background ==
Springsteen began working on Human Touch with the intention of releasing it sometime in 1990, but the project took longer than anticipated. He shelved the project in early 1991, resuming work in September of that year. Intending to record just one more song for the album ("Living Proof"), he ended up writing and tracking ten new songs instead. Once the sessions concluded, he decided to compile the ten new songs into a separate album, which became Lucky Town, and release it simultaneously with Human Touch. While most of the songs from the album have been performed rarely since the reunion of the E Street Band, "If I Should Fall Behind" was featured at every show during the 1999–2000 Reunion Tour and was included on the Live in New York City CD and DVD releases.

== Themes ==
Compared to Human Touch, Lucky Town features a more stripped-down, folk-based sound and more personal lyrics. While Human Touch consists mostly of love songs, Lucky Town focuses on specific events in Springsteen's life. The opening track, "Better Days", expresses his desire for a fresh start following a difficult period in his personal life, including his divorce from his first wife. "Living Proof" was inspired by the birth of his first son, and "Local Hero" recounts an instance when he saw a photograph of himself in a store window, which the sales clerk described as a picture of "just a local hero". "Souls of the Departed" recalls "Born in the U.S.A." in its sonic structure and social commentary; the song was inspired by the Gulf War.

== Critical reception ==
Professional ratings
Review scores
Source	Rating
AllMusic	3/5 stars
Chicago Tribune	2/4 stars
Christgau's Consumer Guide	(neither)
Entertainment Weekly	B
NME	7/10
Pitchfork	6.8/10
Q	4/5 stars
Rolling Stone	4.5/5 stars
Tom Hull	B−

Upon its release, the album received generally positive reviews. Rolling Stone published a favorable combined review of *Lucky Town* and its companion album, *Human Touch*, but noted that the goals of the two records "would have been better realized by a single, more carefully shaped collection." In another mostly positive assessment, AllMusic wrote: "While Human Touch was a disappointing album of second-rate material, Lucky Town is an ambitious collection addressing many of Springsteen's major concerns and moving them forward."

Robert Christgau of The Village Voice called it a "ponderous, well-crafted disappointment, a shorter and by most accounts lighter piece of work than its more songful corelease Human Touch." Bill Wyman of the Chicago Reader compared it favorably to Human Touch, calling Lucky Town "obviously the superior work" and "a much more interesting beast, primarily because of the potency of the first three numbers [which] could have made a respectable anchor to a strong album." However, he added that "the record's illegitimate beginnings soon take their toll, and formula returns to the fore...What themes there are on the record - a sort of Catholic wonder and love of life alternating with the usual fears and worries of the characters in Springsteen's ongoing New Jersey gothic - never come alive." Greg Kot of the Chicago Tribune later wrote that Lucky Town was "highly underrated...containing some of the strongest songwriting of Springsteen's career and ranks as one of his most completely realized albums."

In The Village Voice's annual Pazz & Jop critics' poll, Lucky Town placed at number 17, finishing well ahead of Human Touch, which ranked at number 80.

== Track listing ==
All songs are written by Bruce Springsteen.

No.	Title	Length
1.	"Better Days"	4:05
2.	"Lucky Town"	3:24
3.	"Local Hero"	4:02
4.	"If I Should Fall Behind"	2:57
5.	"Leap of Faith"	3:22
6.	"The Big Muddy"	4:04
7.	"Living Proof"	4:44
8.	"Book of Dreams"	4:20
9.	"Souls of the Departed"	4:16
10.	"My Beautiful Reward"	3:55

=== Unreleased outtakes ===
Eleven songs were written during these sessions, with "Happy" serving as the sole outtake; it was eventually released on the Tracks box set.

== Personnel ==
- Bruce Springsteen – guitar, lead vocals, keyboards, bass, harmonica, percussion

Additional Musicians

- Gary Mallaber – drums
- Roy Bittan – keyboards on "Leap of Faith" and "Living Proof"; keyboard bass on "The Big Muddy"
- Patti Scialfa – backing vocals on "Better Days", "Local Hero", and "Leap of Faith"
- Soozie Tyrell – backing vocals on "Better Days", "Local Hero", and "Leap of Faith"
- Lisa Lowell – backing vocals on "Better Days", "Local Hero", and "Leap of Faith"
- Randy Jackson – bass on "Better Days"
- Ian McLagan – Hammond organ on "My Beautiful Reward"

Technical

- Bruce Springsteen, Jon Landau, Chuck Plotkin – production
- Roy Bittan – additional production on "Leap of Faith", "The Big Muddy", and "Living Proof"
- Toby Scott – engineering
- Greg Goldman, Robert "RJ" Jaczko, Randy Wine – assistant engineering
- Bob Clearmountain – mixing
- Bob Ludwig – mastering
- Scott Hull, Dave Collins – digital editing
- Sandra Choron – art direction
- Victor Weaver – typography design
- David Rose – cover photography, interior photography
- Pam Springsteen – interior photography

== Charts ==
=== Weekly charts ===
Weekly chart performance for Lucky Town
Chart (1992)	Peak position
Australian Albums (ARIA)	6
Austrian Albums (Ö3 Austria)	2
Canadian Albums (RPM)	3
Dutch Albums (Album Top 100)	7
European Albums (Music & Media)	2
German Albums (Offizielle Top 100)	4
Italian Albums (Musica e Dischi)	2
Japanese Albums (Oricon)	5
New Zealand Albums (RMNZ)	6
Norwegian Albums (VG-lista)	2
Spanish Albums (AFYVE)	2
Swedish Albums (Sverigetopplistan)	3
Swiss Albums (Schweizer Hitparade)	2
UK Albums (Official Charts)	2
US Billboard 200	3
Zimbabwean Albums (ZIMA)	4

=== Year-end charts ===
Year-end chart performance for Lucky Town
Chart (1992)	Position
Austrian Albums (Ö3 Austria)	26
Canada Top Albums/CDs (RPM)	33
Dutch Albums (Album Top 100)	65
French Albums Chart	80
German Albums (Offizielle Top 100)	45
Swiss Albums (Schweizer Hitparade)	33
UK Albums (OCC)	96
US Billboard 200	79

== Certifications ==
Certifications and sales for Lucky Town
Region	Certification	Certified units/sales
Australia (ARIA)	Platinum	70,000^{^}
Austria (IFPI Austria)	Gold	25,000^{*}
Canada (Music Canada)	2× Platinum	200,000^{^}
Finland (Musiikkituottajat)	Gold	28,642
Germany (BVMI)	Gold	250,000^{^}
Japan (RIAJ)	Gold	110,000
New Zealand (RMNZ)	Gold	7,500^{^}
Spain (Promusicae)	Platinum	100,000^{^}
Sweden (GLF)	Platinum	100,000^{^}
Switzerland (IFPI Switzerland)	Gold	25,000^{^}
United Kingdom (BPI)	Gold	100,000^{^}
United States (RIAA)	Platinum	1,000,000^{^}
^{*} Sales figures based on certification alone.^{^} Shipments figures based on certification alone.
