= Better Days (Bruce Springsteen song) =

1992 single by Bruce Springsteen

Single by Bruce Springsteen

from the album Lucky Town
- B-side: "Tougher Than the Rest" (live)
- Released: March 1992 (with "Human Touch"); May 11, 1992 (solo)
- Length: 4:08 (album version); 3:45 (radio edit)
- Label: Columbia
- Songwriter: Bruce Springsteen
- Producers: Jon Landau, Chuck Plotkin, Bruce Springsteen

Bruce Springsteen singles chronology
"Human Touch" (1992)	"Better Days" (1992)	"57 Channels (And Nothin' On)" (1992)

Music video
- "Better Days" on YouTube

"Better Days" is the first single from American singer-songwriter Bruce Springsteen's 10th studio album, Lucky Town (1992). In the United States, it was released by Columbia Records as a double A-side with "Human Touch" in March 1992, while "Better Days" by itself was issued in the United Kingdom on May 11, 1992. "Human Touch" / "Better Days" reached number 16 on the US Billboard Hot 100 while "Better Days" entered the top 10 in Italy, peaking at number four. "Better Days" was ranked at number 70 on Rolling Stone's list of the "100 Greatest Bruce Springsteen Songs.

== Track listings ==
- US and European 7-inch and CD single
1. "Human Touch" – 6:30
2. "Better Days" – 4:08
- US and European 12-inch and CD maxi-single
1. "Human Touch" – 6:30
2. "Better Days" – 4:08
3. "Souls of the Departed" – 4:16
- European 7-inch single
1. "Better Days" – 4:08
2. "Tougher Than the Rest" (live) – 6:30
- European 12-inch and CD maxi-single
1. "Better Days" – 4:08
2. "Tougher Than the Rest" (live) – 6:30
3. "Part Man, Part Monkey" – 4:29

== Personnel ==
Personnel taken from Lucky Town liner notes.

- Bruce Springsteen – vocals, all instruments except where noted
- Gary Mallaber – drums
- Randy Jackson – bass
- Patti Scialfa – backing vocals
- Soozie Tyrell – backing vocals
- Lisa Lowell – backing vocals

== Charts ==
Weekly chart performance for "Better Days"
Chart (1992)	Peak position
Australia (ARIA)	75
Belgium (Ultratop 50 Flanders)	28
Canada Top Singles (RPM)	36
Europe (Eurochart Hot 100)	41
Ireland (IRMA)	25
Italy (Musica e dischi)	4
Netherlands (Single Top 100)	29
Sweden (Sverigetopplistan)	23
Switzerland (Schweizer Hitparade)	39
UK Singles (Official Charts)	34
UK Airplay (Music Week)	20
US Billboard Hot 100 with "Human Touch"	16
US Mainstream Rock (Billboard)	2

== Release history ==
Release dates and formats for "Better Days"
Region	Version	Date	Format(s)	Label(s)	Ref.
United States	with "Human Touch"	March 1992	7-inch vinyl; CD; cassette	Columbia	
United Kingdom	Solo	May 11, 1992	7-inch vinyl; 12-inch vinyl; CD; cassette	Columbia	
Australia	Solo	June 1, 1992	CD; cassette	Columbia	
