= Human Touch (Bruce Springsteen song) =

1992 single by Bruce Springsteen

Single by Bruce Springsteen

from the album Human Touch
- B-side: "Souls of the Departed"
- Released: March 9, 1992
- Studio: A&M (Hollywood, California)
- Genre: Rock
- Length: 6:28; 5:09 (radio edit)
- Label: Columbia
- Songwriter: Bruce Springsteen
- Producers: Roy Bittan; Jon Landau; Chuck Plotkin; Bruce Springsteen

Bruce Springsteen singles chronology
"Sad Eyes" (1990)	"Human Touch" (1992)	"Better Days" (1992)

Music video
- "Human Touch" on YouTube

"Human Touch" is a song recorded by the American rock singer and songwriter Bruce Springsteen. It was the first single from his tenth studio album of the same name (1992) and was released on March 9, 1992 by Columbia Records. The song features Randy Jackson on bass guitar, and Toto's Jeff Porcaro on drums. In the United States, the song reached number 16 on the US Billboard Hot 100—charting as a double A-side single with "Better Days"—and topped the Mainstream Rock chart for three weeks.

The song reached number one in Denmark, Italy, Norway, and Spain and was a top-10 hit in several other countries, including Canada, Ireland, the Netherlands, Sweden, and Switzerland. "Human Touch" was nominated for Best Rock Song at the 1993 Grammy Awards. The music video, directed by Meiert Avis, received an MTV Video Music Awards nomination for Best Male Video.

== Track listings ==
- US and European 7-inch and CD single
1. "Human Touch" – 6:30
2. "Better Days" – 4:08
- US and European 12-inch and CD maxi-single
1. "Human Touch" – 6:30
2. "Better Days" – 4:08
3. "Souls of the Departed" – 4:16
- European 12-inch and CD maxi-single
1. "Human Touch" – 4:08
2. "Souls of the Departed" – 4:16
3. "Long Goodbye" – 3:26

== Personnel ==
According to authors Philippe Margotin and Jean-Michel Guesdon:

- Bruce Springsteen – vocals, guitar
- Randy Jackson – bass
- Jeff Porcaro – drums, tambourine
- Roy Bittan – keyboards
- Patti Scialfa – backing vocals

== Charts ==
=== Weekly charts ===
Weekly chart performance for "Human Touch"
Chart (1992)	Peak position
Australia (ARIA)	17
Austria (Ö3 Austria Top 40)	19
Belgium (Ultratop 50 Flanders)	3
Canada Top Singles (RPM)	2
Canada Adult Contemporary (RPM)	6
Denmark (IFPI)	1
Europe (Eurochart Hot 100)	2
Europe (European Hit Radio)	1
Finland (Suomen virallinen lista)	4
France (SNEP)	20
Germany (GfK)	15
Ireland (IRMA)	4
Italy (Musica e dischi)	1
Netherlands (Dutch Top 40)	5
Netherlands (Single Top 100)	3
New Zealand (Recorded Music NZ)	12
Norway (VG-lista)	1
Portugal (AFP)	2
Quebec (ADISQ)	5
Spain (AFYVE)	1
Sweden (Sverigetopplistan)	4
Switzerland (Schweizer Hitparade)	4
UK Singles (Official Charts)	11
UK Airplay (Music Week)	1
US Billboard Hot 100 with "Better Days"	16
US Adult Contemporary (Billboard)	8
US Mainstream Rock (Billboard)	1
US Cash Box Top 100	13
Zimbabwe (ZIMA)	8

=== Year-end charts ===
Year-end chart performance for "Human Touch"
Chart (1992)	Position
Belgium (Ultratop)	63
Canada Top Singles (RPM)	13
Canada Adult Contemporary (RPM)	62
Europe (Eurochart Hot 100)	31
Europe (European Hit Radio)	18
Germany (Media Control)	89
Netherlands (Dutch Top 40)	86
Netherlands (Single Top 100)	75
Sweden (Topplistan)	42
UK Airplay (Music Week)	75

== Certifications ==
Certifications for "Human Touch"
Region	Certification	Certified units/sales
Australia (ARIA)	Gold	35,000^{‡}
Norway (IFPI Norway)	Gold	
^{‡} Sales+streaming figures based on certification alone.

== Release history ==
Release dates and formats for "Human Touch"
Region	Date	Format(s)	Label(s)	Ref.
Australia	March 9, 1992	CD; cassette	Columbia	
United Kingdom	March 9, 1992	7-inch vinyl; CD; cassette	Columbia	
United Kingdom	March 16, 1992	CD picture disc	Columbia	
Japan	March 19, 1992	Mini-CD	Sony	

== See also ==
- List of number-one hits in Norway
- List of number-one mainstream rock hits (United States)
