= Jon Landau =

American music critic and record producer (born 1947)

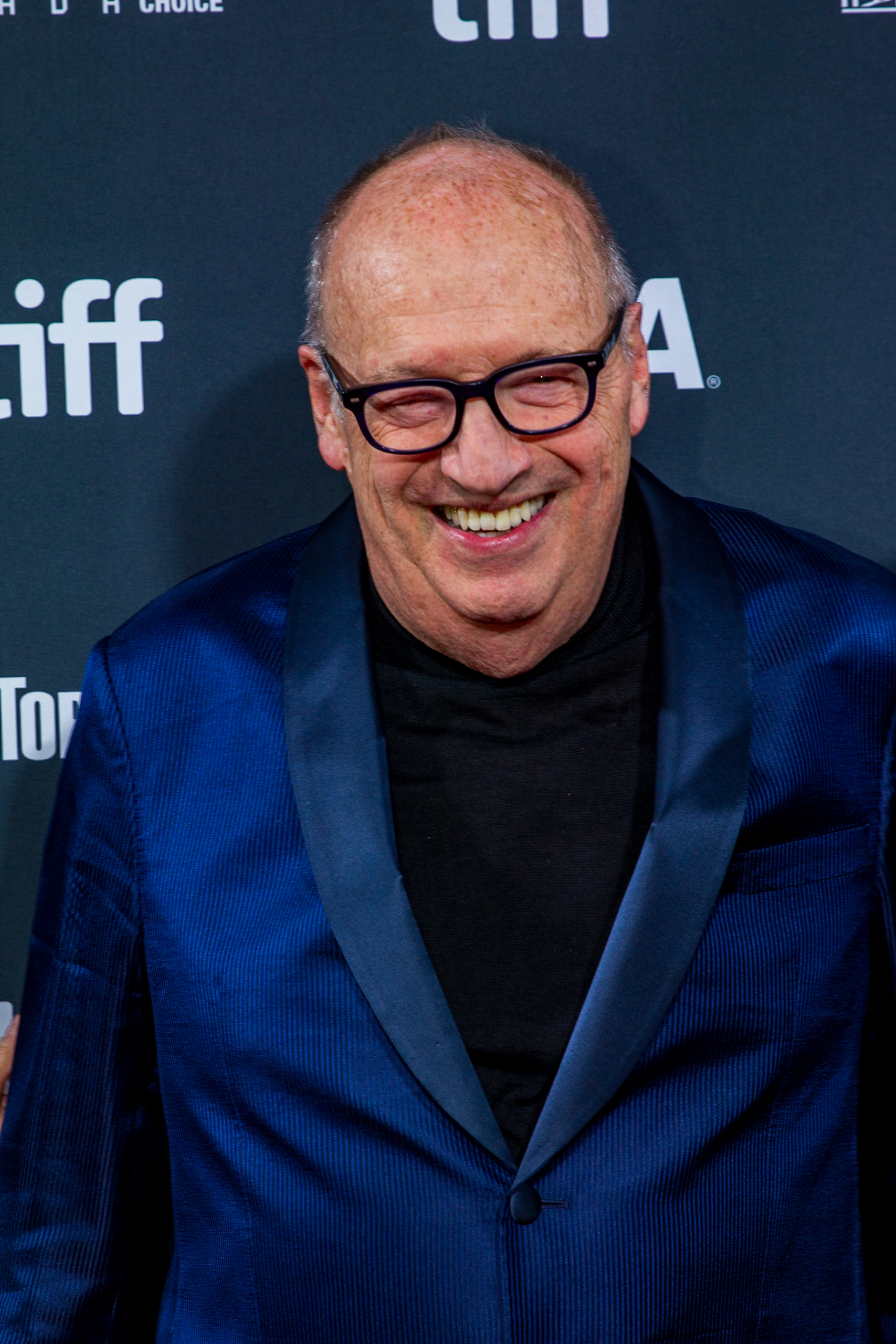
- Landau at the 2024 Toronto International Film Festival
- Born: May 14, 1947 (age 79); New York City, U.S.
- Occupations: Record producer, music critic
- Spouse(s): Janet Maslin; Barbara Downey
- Children: 2

Jon Landau (born May 14, 1947) is an American music critic, manager, and record producer. He is best known for his work with Bruce Springsteen. He is the head of the nominating committee for the Rock and Roll Hall of Fame, and received that institution's Ahmet Ertegun Award for Lifetime Achievement in 2020.

== Early life ==
Born in New York City to a Jewish family, Landau grew up in Bensonhurst, Brooklyn, and then in Queens before his family moved to the Boston suburb of Lexington, Massachusetts, when he was 12. He attended Lexington High School and then Brandeis University, where he earned a degree in history with honors.

Aligning himself with the growing underground culture of late-1960s Boston, Landau carved out a niche while writing for the music magazine Crawdaddy. Landau championed the straightforward rock and roll that he loved, and wrote scathing reviews of what he saw as the overblown, pretentious San Francisco scene.

As a critic, Landau wrote for Rolling Stone and for other publications. In Volume 1, Number 1 of Rolling Stone, published on November 9, 1967, Landau compared the debut albums of Jimi Hendrix (Are You Experienced) and Eric Clapton and Cream (Fresh Cream), both of whose tours had made huge splashes that summer. In the next few issues, Landau staked out more traditional R&B and soul territory with profiles of Aretha Franklin, and Sam and Dave, plus a posthumous appreciation of Otis Redding.

== Bruce Springsteen connection ==
Landau's 1974 article in The Real Paper, wherein he claimed, "I saw rock and roll's future and its name is Bruce Springsteen!," is credited by Nick Hornby with fostering Springsteen's popularity. Landau was then hired by Springsteen, and is cited as co-producer on Springsteen studio records from 1975's Born to Run through 1992's Human Touch and Lucky Town. Landau is considered to have influenced Springsteen artistically as well as professionally. He has occasionally joined Springsteen onstage to play guitar.

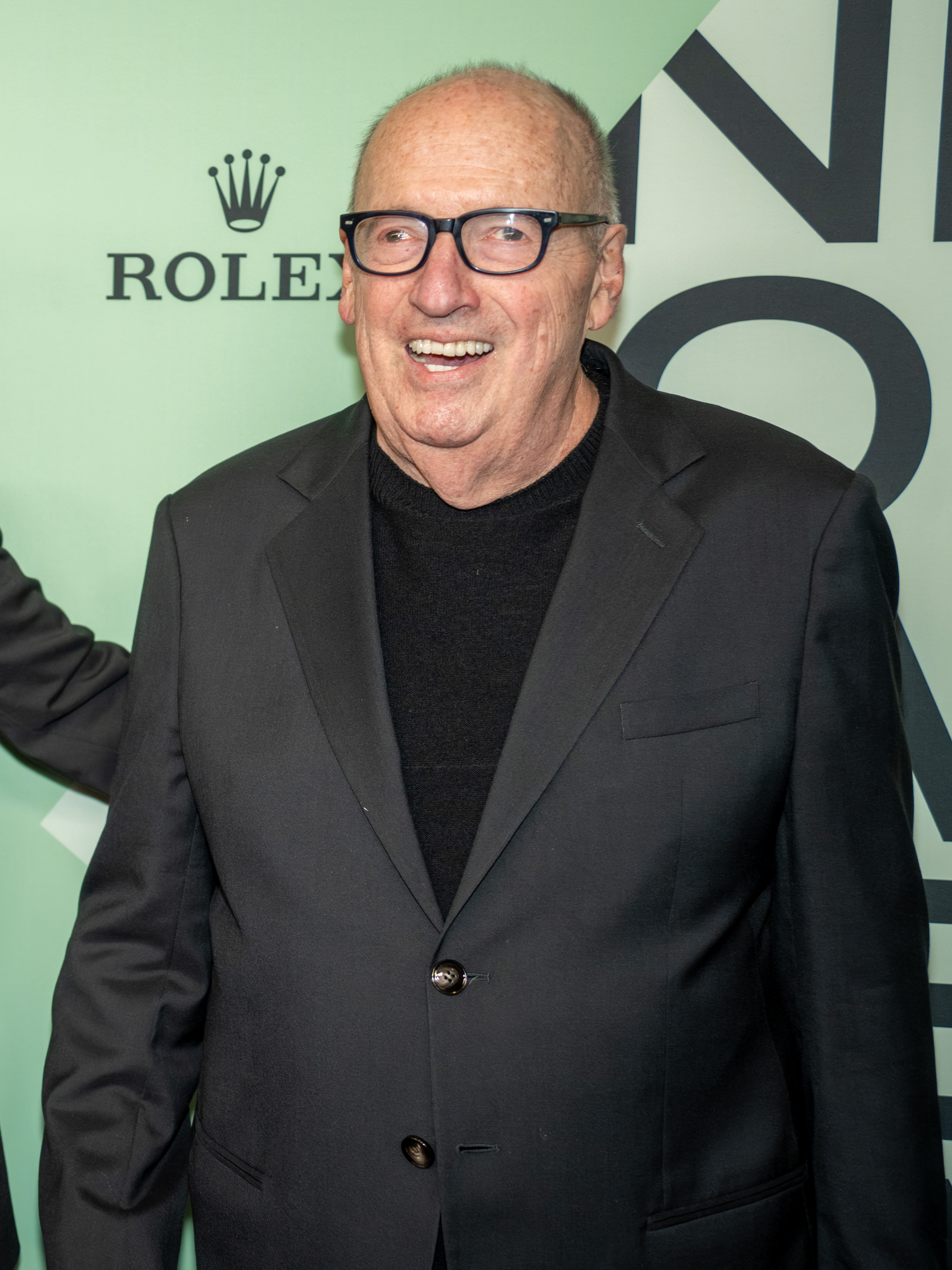
Landau at the New York Film Festival in 2025 for Springsteen: Deliver Me from Nowhere

In January 2024, it was announced that director and writer Scott Cooper would make a film based on the making of Springsteen's 1982 album Nebraska with involvement by Springsteen and Landau. The film, Springsteen: Deliver Me from Nowhere, is based on the 2023 book by Warren Zanes and produced by former Netflix Films chairman Scott Stuber for A24. Actor Jeremy Allen White plays Springsteen and Jeremy Strong plays Landau. It was later announced that 20th Century Studios had acquired the film in a bidding war with A24, joining the project as financier and distributor. The film was released in 2025.

== Other music projects ==
Other artists that Landau has managed or produced include MC5, Livingston Taylor, Jackson Browne, Natalie Merchant, Alejandro Escovedo, Train, and Shania Twain.

Landau has been responsible for the liner notes for The Atlantic Albums Collection by Aretha Franklin (2015), Soul Manifesto: 1964–1970 by Otis Redding (2015), and The Complete Atlantic Albums Collection by Wilson Pickett (2017).

== Personal life ==
Landau was once married to The New York Times film critic (and later book reviewer) Janet Maslin. He later married Barbara Downey, a former Rolling Stone editor. They have two grown children. In 2011, Landau had a growth in his brain surgically removed. The surgery resulted in the loss of sight in one eye.

Jon endowed a fine arts scholarship at Brandeis University in 1997. He received an honorary degree from Brandeis in 2019. He emphasized the importance of art in his speech: "I believe art is life," Landau said. "And, without art, there is no life. So let's all of us carry on – creating, seeking, searching and making art a part of our lives. It's art that brings out the human in all of us."

== Art collection ==
Landau and his wife Barbara own an art collection described by the Boston Globe as "the envy of the most serious and committed collectors." It includes works from Renaissance and Baroque artists such as paintings by Titian, Tintoretto, and Tiepolo; and sculptures by Donatello, Ghiberti, Verrocchio, della Robbia, and Pietro and Gian Lorenzo Bernini. It also includes works by the Old Masters: Italian painting and sculpture from the 13th through 17th centuries. The 19th-century Realist, Romantic, and Barbizon movements are represented by works from Géricault, Delacroix, Corot, and one of the largest private holdings of Courbet, with fifteen works (which took 20 years to amass), and English paintings.

With the exceptions of his family and work, collecting is reportedly Landau's greatest interest in life. He declared that if he went back to school, "I would study Renaissance art." Landau discussed his art collection on a panel at the Clark Institute in Williamstown, Massachusetts, in 2016. He also served on a Sotheby's panel called "Collecting Masters: The Auction, Museum & Individual" in 2017.

Works from the collection have been lent to leading museums, including The Metropolitan Museum of Art in New York, the Prado in Madrid, the Louvre in Paris, and the National Gallery in London. The couple has donated works to museums, including a Poussin to the Metropolitan, which they regard as "the greatest artistic institution in the country" and a Barocci sketch to the St. Louis Art Museum in 2020. They have promised a Théodore Rousseau landscape to the Metropolitan.
