= Steven Van Zandt discography =

Cataloging of published recordings by Steven Van Zandt

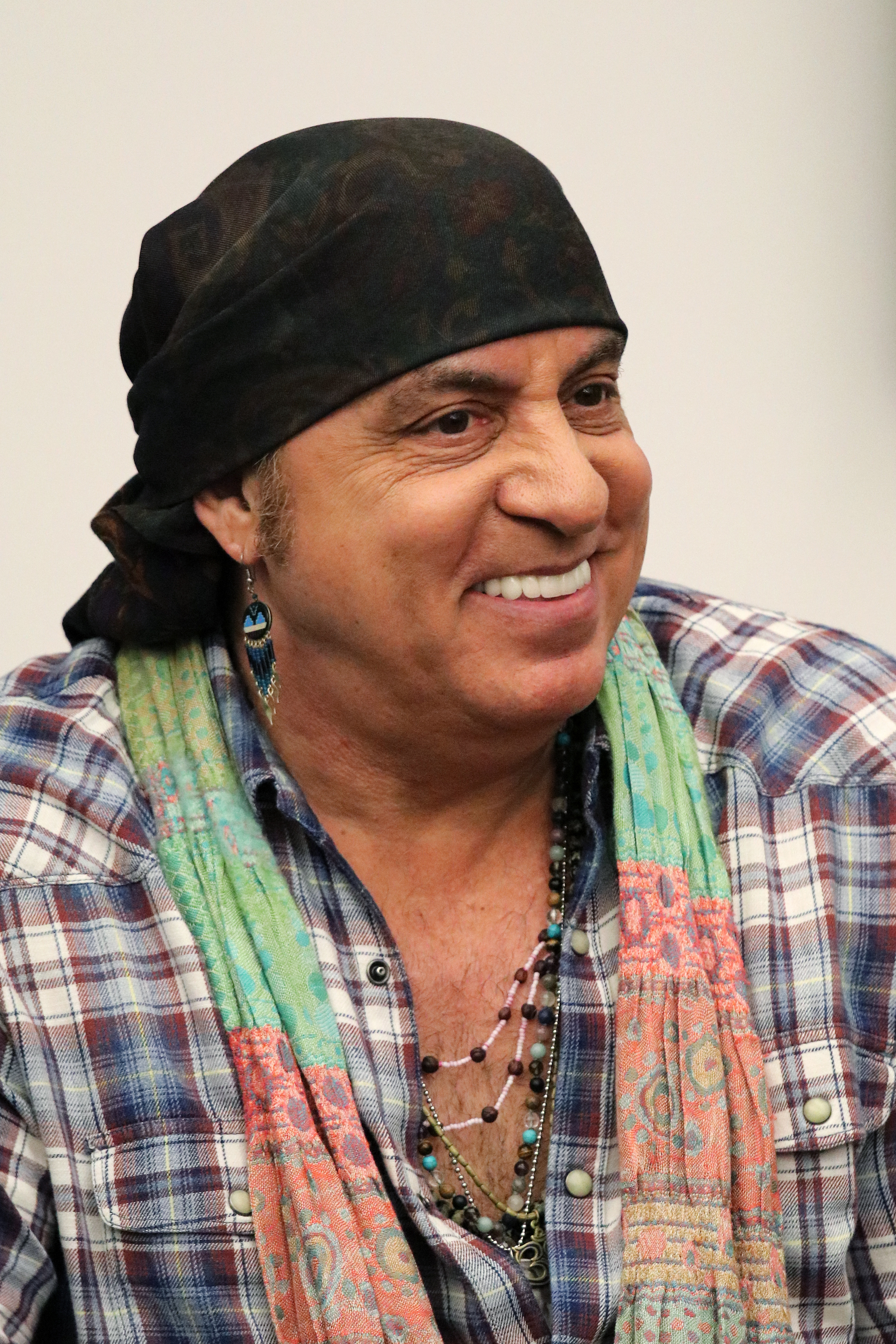
- Van Zandt at the 2018 Social Media Weekend in New York City
- Studio albums: 7
- Live albums: 1
- Compilation albums: 2
- Singles: 29
- Box sets: 1

This is the discography of Steven Van Zandt (also known as "Little Steven" or "Miami Steve"), an American songwriter, singer, musician, and actor. Van Zandt has been featured on records steadily since 1975 as a member of Bruce Springsteen's The E Street Band and Southside Johnny and the Asbury Jukes, as well as with his own band Little Steven and the Disciples of Soul.

== Albums ==
=== Studio albums ===
List of albums, with selected chart positions, and certifications
Title	Album details	Peak chart positions										Certifications
Title	Album details	US	AUS	CAN	GER	IRE	NLD	NZ	NOR	SWE	UK	Certifications
Men Without Women	Released: October 1, 1982; Label: EMI; Format: LP, Cassette, CD, Digital	118	—	—	—	—	—	—	—	26	73	
Voice of America	Released: May 7, 1984; Label: EMI; Format: LP, Cassette, CD, Digital	55	—	—	—	—	—	—	6	8	—	
Freedom – No Compromise	Released: March 20, 1987; Label: EMI; Format: LP, Cassette, CD, Digital	80	—	—	48	—	51	—	11	3	52	
Revolution	Released: 1989; Label: RCA; Format: LP, Cassette, CD, Digital	—	—	—	—	—	—	—	—	32	—	
Born Again Savage	Released: September 10, 1999; Label: Renegade Nation; Format: CD, Digital	—	—	—	—	—	—	—	—	—	—	
Soulfire	Released: May 19, 2017; Label: Wicked Cool Records, UMe; Format: 2 LP, CD, Digital	—	—	—	74	—	80	—	—	—	—	
Summer of Sorcery	Released: May 3, 2019; Label: Wicked Cool Records, UMe; Format: 2 LP, CD, Digital	—	—	—	39	—	—	—	—	—	94	
"—" denotes album that did not chart or was not released

=== Live albums ===
List of albums, with selected chart positions, and certifications
Title	Album details	Peak chart positions										Certifications
Title	Album details	US	AUS	CAN	GER	IRE	NLD	NZ	NOR	SWE	UK	Certifications
Soulfire Live!	Released: April 27, 2018 January 29, 2021 (Expanded Edition); Label: Wicked Cool Records; Format: 3 CD, 7 LP, digital	—	—	—	31	—	139	—	—	—	—	
Macca to Mecca! Live at the Cavern Club, Liverpool	Released: January 29, 2021; Label: Wicked Cool Records; Format: CD, digital	—	—	—	—	—	—	—	—	—	—	
Summer of Sorcery Live! At the Beacon Theatre	Released: July 9, 2021; Label: Wicked Cool Records; Format: 3 CD, 5 LP, digital	—	—	—	—	—	—	—	—	—	—	
"—" denotes album that did not chart or was not released

=== Soundtrack albums ===
List of albums, with selected chart positions, and certifications
Title	Album details	Peak chart positions										Certifications
Title	Album details	US	AUS	CAN	GER	IRE	NLD	NZ	NOR	SWE	UK	Certifications
Lilyhammer: The Score	Released: December 2014 (Digital); July 12, 2019 (CD, LP); Label: Wicked Cool Records, UMe; Format: 2 CD, LP, Digital	—	—	—	—	—	—	—	—	—	—	
"—" denotes album that did not chart or was not released

=== Compilation albums ===
List of albums, with selected chart positions, and certifications
Title	Album details	Peak chart positions										Certifications
Title	Album details	US	AUS	CAN	GER	IRE	NLD	NZ	NOR	SWE	UK	Certifications
Greatest Hits	Released: 1999; Label: EMI; Format: CD	—	—	—	—	—	—	—	—	—	—	
The Early Work	Released: November 1, 2019; Label: Wicked Cool Records, UMe; Format: Digital	—	—	—	—	—	—	—	—	—	—	
"—" denotes album that did not chart or was not released

== Box sets ==
List of albums, with selected chart positions, and certifications
Title	Album details	Peak chart positions										Certifications
Title	Album details	US	AUS	CAN	GER	IRE	NLD	NZ	NOR	SWE	UK	Certifications
Rock N Roll Rebel: The Early Work	Released: December 6, 2019 July 31, 2020; Label: Wicked Cool Records, UMe; Format: 7 LP, 4 CD 10 CD, 3 DVD	—	—	—	—	—	—	—	—	—	—	
"—" denotes album that did not chart or was not released

== Extended plays ==
List of albums, with selected chart positions, and certifications
Title	Album details	Peak chart positions										Certifications
Title	Album details	US	AUS	CAN	GER	IRE	NLD	NZ	NOR	SWE	UK	Certifications
Little Steven	Released: 1989; Label: Amiga; Format: 7"	—	—	—	—	—	—	—	—	—	—	
Vote!	Released: October 25, 2019; Label: Wicked Cool Records, UMe; Format: Digital	—	—	—	—	—	—	—	—	—	—	
Bitter Fruit	Released: November 29, 2019; Label: Wicked Cool Records, UMe; Format: Digital	—	—	—	—	—	—	—	—	—	—	
"—" denotes album that did not chart or was not released

== Singles ==
Title	Year	Peak chart positions											Certifications	Album
Title	Year	US	US Rock	AUS	CAN	GER	IRE	NLD	NZ	NOR	SWE	UK	Certifications	Album
"Forever / Caravan"	1982	63	39	—	—	—	—	23	—	—	—	—		Men Without Women
"I've Been Waiting"	1982	—	—	—	—	—	—	—	—	—	—	—		Men Without Women
"Save Me"	1982	—	—	—	—	—	—	—	—	—	—	—		Men Without Women
"Lyin' in a Bed of Fire"	1983	—	30	—	—	—	—	—	—	—	—	—		Men Without Women
"Solidarity"	1983	—	—	—	—	—	—	—	—	—	—	—		Voice of America
"Out of the Darkness"	1984	—	—	—	—	—	—	—	—	8	—	—		Voice of America
"Los Desaparecidos (The Disappeared Ones)"	1984	—	27	—	—	—	—	—	—	—	—	—		Voice of America
"Undefeated (Everybody Goes Home)"	1984	—	—	—	—	—	—	—	—	—	—	—		
"Vote!"	—	—	—	—	—	—	—	—	—	—	—			Non-album single
"Bitter Fruit"	1987	—	—	—	69	—	—	25	—	—	12	66		Freedom – No Compromise
"No More Party's"	1987	—	—	—	—	—	—	—	—	—	—	—		Freedom – No Compromise
"Trail of Broken Treaties"	1987	—	29	—	—	—	—	—	—	—	—	—		Freedom – No Compromise
"Revolution"	1989	—	—	—	—	—	—	73	—	—	—	—		Revolution
"Love and Forgiveness"	1989	—	—	—	—	—	—	—	—	—	—	—		Revolution
"Leonard Peltier"	1989	—	—	—	—	—	—	—	—	—	—	—		Revolution
"The Time of Your Life"	1995	—	—	—	—	—	—	—	—	—	—	—		Nine Months: Original Motion Picture Soundtrack
"Camouflage of Righteousness"	1999	—	—	—	—	—	—	—	—	—	—	—		Born Again Savage
"Salvation"	1999	—	40	—	—	—	—	—	—	—	—	—		Born Again Savage
"My Kind of Town"	2014	—	—	—	—	—	—	—	—	—	—	—		Lilyhammer: The Score
"Saint Valentines Day"	2017	—	—	—	—	—	—	—	—	—	—	—		Soulfire
"Soulfire"	2017	—	—	—	—	—	—	—	—	—	—	—		Soulfire
"Love on the Wrong Side of Town"	2017	—	—	—	—	—	—	—	—	—	—	—		Soulfire
"Blues Is My Business"	2017	—	—	—	—	—	—	—	—	—	—	—		Soulfire
"Groovin' Is Easy"	2017	—	—	—	—	—	—	—	—	—	—	—		Non-album single
"Merry Christmas (I Don't Want to Fight Tonight)"	2017	—	—	—	—	—	—	—	—	—	—	—		Non-album single
"Superfly Terraplane"	2019	—	—	—	—	—	—	—	—	—	—	—		Summer of Sorcery
"Communion"	2019	—	—	—	—	—	—	—	—	—	—	—		Summer of Sorcery
"A World of Our Own"	2019	—	—	—	—	—	—	—	—	—	—	—		Summer of Sorcery
"Love Again"	2019	—	—	—	—	—	—	—	—	—	—	—		Summer of Sorcery
"Tucson Train (Live)"	2019	—	—	—	—	—	—	—	—	—	—	—		Non-album single
"Can You Feel It"	2026	—	—	—	—	—	—	—	—	—	—	—		Non-album single
"—" denotes a title that did not chart, or was not released in that territory.

=== Promotional Singles/Other Charted Songs ===
Title	Year	Peak chart positions											Certifications	Album
Title	Year	US	US Rock	AUS	CAN	GER	IRE	NLD	NZ	NOR	SWE	UK	Certifications	Album
"Under the Gun"	1982	—	—	—	—	—	—	—	—	—	—	—		Men Without Women
"Checkpoint Charlie"	1984	—	—	—	—	—	—	—	—	—	—	—		Voice of America
"Fruta Amarga"	1987	—	—	—	—	—	—	—	—	—	—	—		Non-album single
"Freedom"	1987	—	—	—	—	—	—	—	—	—	—	—		Freedom – No Compromise
"—" denotes a title that did not chart, or was not released in that territory.

=== As featured artist ===
Title	Year	Peak chart positions											Certifications	Album
Title	Year	US	US Rock	AUS	CAN	GER	IRE	NLD	NZ	NOR	SWE	UK	Certifications	Album
"Sun City" (as part of Artists United Against Apartheid)	1985	38	—	4	10	17	8	4	4	—	3	21		Sun City
"Time to Take a Stand" (with Gone at Last and Claudia Scott)	1989	—	—	—	—	—	—	—	—	—	—	—		Non-album single
"Spirit of the Forest" (as part of Spirit of the Forest)	1989	—	—	—	—	—	—	—	—	—	—	—		Non-album single
"—" denotes a title that did not chart, or was not released in that territory.

Note: The single "Way Down (I Won't Cry No More)" featuring Van Zandt from Dion's Blues with Friends didn't chart (2020)

== Videography ==
=== Video albums ===
Year	Title
2005	Little Steven at Rockpalast: Released: May 30, 2005; Label: WDR Fernsehen, Studio Hamburg; Format: 2 DVD
2006	Little Steven Live at Full House: Released: October 30, 2006; Label: ARD Video; Format: DVD
2019	Soulfire Live!: Released: February 15, 2019; Label: Wicked Cool Records, UMe; Format: 2 Blu-ray
2021	Macca to Mecca! Live at the Cavern Club, Liverpool: Released: January 29, 2021; Label: Wicked Cool Records, UMe; Format: DVD
2021	Summer of Sorcery Live! At the Beacon Theatre: Released: July 9, 2021; Label: Wicked Cool Records, UMe; Format: Blu-ray

=== Music videos ===
Year	Title	Ref.
1982	"Forever"	
1983	"Out of the Darkness"	
1983-84	"Undefeated (Everybody Goes Home)"	
1987	"Trail of Broken Treaties"	
1987	"Bitter Fruit"	
1989	"Love and Forgiveness"	
1989	"Leonard Peltier"	
1989	"Revolution"	
1995	"The Time of Your Life"	
2014	"My Kind of Town"	
2017	"Merry Christmas (I Don't Want to Fight Tonight)"	
2018	"Can I Get a Witness" (Live at the Orpheum Theatre)	
2018	"Soulfire" (Live from the Soulfire Tour)	
2019	"I Saw Her Standing There" (feat. Paul McCartney) (Live at Roadhouse)	
2019	"Lyin' in a Bed of Fire" (Live from the Peppermint Lounge 1982)	
2019	"Save Me" (Live from the Peppermint Lounge 1982)	
2019	"Solidarity (Live)"	
2019	"I Am a Patriot (Live)"	
2019	"Love Again"	
2019	"Tucson Train" (Live at the Rialto Theatre)	

== Band member / guest appearances ==
- Bruce Springsteen
  - Born to Run (1975)
  - Darkness on the Edge of Town (1978)
  - The River (1980)
  - Born in the U.S.A. (1984)
  - Live/1975-85 (1986)
  - Greatest Hits (1995)
  - Blood Brothers (1996)
  - Tracks (1998)
  - 18 Tracks (1999)
  - Live in New York City (2001)
  - The Rising (2002)
  - The Essential Bruce Springsteen (2003)
  - Hammersmith Odeon London '75 (2006)
  - Magic (2007)
  - Magic Tour Highlights (2008)
  - Working on a Dream (2009)
  - The Promise (2010)
  - Wrecking Ball (2012)
  - High Hopes (2014)
  - Letter to You (2020)
- Southside Johnny & The Asbury Jukes
  - I Don't Want To Go Home (1976)
  - Live at the Bottom Line (1976)
  - This Time It's for Real (1977)
  - Hearts of Stone (1978)
  - Havin' a Party (1979)
  - Better Days (1991)
  - Jukebox (2007)
- Ronnie Spector & The E Street Band
  - "Say Goodbye to Hollywood" / "Baby Please Don't Go" (1977)
- Gary U.S. Bonds
  - Dedication (1981)
  - On the Line (1982)
  - Standing in the Line of Fire (1984)
- Artists United Against Apartheid
  - Sun City (1985)
- Iron City Houserockers
  - Have a Good Time But Get Out Alive! (1980)
- Meat Loaf
  - Welcome to the Neighborhood (1995)
- Jimmy Barnes
  - For The Working Class Man (1985)
- Davie Allan & The Arrows
  - Fuzz for the Holidays (2004)
- Darlene Love
  - "All Alone on Christmas" (1992)
  - Introducing Darlene Love (2015)
- Demolition 23.
  - Demolition 23. (1994)
