= Soulfire (Little Steven album) =

Studio album by Little Steven
- Released: May 19, 2017
- Recorded: November–December 2016
- Studios: Renegade Studios, NYC
- Genres: R&B, Rock, Blues, Soul
- Length: 57:11
- Labels: Wicked Cool Records; Big Machine Records; UMe
- Producers: Stevie Van Zandt; Geoff Sanoff; Marc Ribler

Little Steven chronology
Born Again Savage (1999)	Soulfire (2017)	Soulfire Live! (2018)

Singles from Soulfire
- 1. "Saint Valentine's Day" Released: February 9, 2017; 2. "Soulfire" Released: April 21, 2017; 3. "Love on the Wrong Side of Town" Released: May 5, 2017; 4. "Blues Is My Business" Released: May 12, 2017; 5. "Groovin' Is Easy" Released: 2017

Professional ratings
Review scores
Source	Rating
AllMusic	3.5/5 stars
American Songwriter	4/5 stars
antiMUSIC	4/5 stars
Classic Rock	3/5 stars
Get Ready to Rock!	4/5 stars
Glide Magazine	8.0
Maximum Volume Music	8.5
Paste	8.6

Soulfire is the sixth solo studio album by Little Steven, released on May 19, 2017. It marks his first studio album (excluding Lilyhammer: The Score) since 1999's Born Again Savage. The album consists of Van Zandt's versions of songs that he either wrote or co-wrote for other artists and describes it as "me covering me!" In June 2017, Rolling Stone ranked Soulfire number 28 on their list of the "50 Best Albums of 2017 So Far."

== Background ==
Little Steven and the Disciples of Soul returned from an 18-year hiatus by performing at London's Bluesfest at Indigo at The O2 on October 29, 2016. He reformed the Disciples of Soul with members Marc Ribler, Rich Mercurio, Jack Daley, Andy Burton, Lowell "Banana" Levinger, Stan Harrison, Clark Gayton, Ravi Best, Ron Tooley, Anthony Almonte, in addition to longtime member Eddie Manion and a female vocalist section consisting of Jessica Wagner, Sara Devine, and Tania Jones. Van Zandt then decided that since they took the time to learn the songs, they should make an album together. He stated that he "felt a bit guilty about having walked away from Little Steven the artist. I left that part of myself behind and I shouldn't have done that. I let the material down by not continuing to perform it. I betrayed the work and I want to fix that. I didn't give up on the material – there were a lot of other factors – but I do have a sense of wanting some redemption for it." The album was recorded and mixed in six weeks at Van Zandt's own Renegade Studios in New York City and mixing engineer Bob Clearmountain's Mix This! studio in Los Angeles.

Van Zandt debuted his new album at the annual Rock and Roll for Children event at the Fillmore Theater in Silver Spring, Maryland, on March 18, 2017. He debuted a doo-wop song called "The City Weeps Tonight." At the end of the show, he covered "Bye Bye Johnny" as a tribute to the late Chuck Berry.

Van Zandt admitted that it helped keep his songwriting active by writing songs for bands that he signed to his label, Wicked Cool Records. He co-wrote the title track with Anders Bruus from the Danish rock band the Breakers for their 2011 eponymous album, released on Van Zandt's label. "I'm Comin' Back" was a track Van Zandt wrote for Southside Johnny and the Asbury Jukes' 1991 release Better Days. Van Zandt said that "it's one of my favorite lyrics that I've ever written."

"Blues Is My Business" is a cover of the Etta James song from 2003. The band tried it out for their BluesFest performance and Van Zandt decided that he liked his arrangement enough to include it on the album. "I Saw the Light" was a song he started writing in the 2010s for Richie Sambora and Orianthi but did not finish, but rediscovered it while working on Soulfire and decided to finish it for himself. "Some Things Just Don't Change" is another one of Van Zandt's favorite tracks that he wrote for Southside Johnny that was originally released on This Time It's for Real in 1977. "Love on the Wrong Side of Town" was also on that album and Van Zandt co-wrote it with Bruce Springsteen.

"The City Weeps Tonight" was an outtake from his debut album, 1982's Men Without Women. "It was going to be the first song on my first solo album. I was going to do a chronological history of rock 'n' roll with my own records but the concept changed and I got political. It remained three-quarters finished all these years, but I always liked it. I love doo-wop so this was a great way to get that onto the record." Van Zandt also covered James Brown's "Down and Out in New York City" from 1973 but incorporated jazz elements into it. Since he never had a blues song on a record, he wanted to experiment with it. "Standing in the Line of Fire" is a song that Little Steven co-wrote with Gary U.S. Bonds for the 1984 album of the same name. He thought that he could not do better than the way it turned out on Bonds's album so he challenged himself to make a new arrangement of it.

"Saint Valentine's Day" is a cover of Norwegian rock band the Cocktail Slippers' 2009 hit, originally titled "St. Valentine's Day Massacre". The band, for whom Van Zandt produced their St. Valentine's Day Massacre album, was signed to his label. Van Zandt originally intended for the track to be for Nancy Sinatra, but the session never happened, so he did a similar arrangement for the Cocktail Slippers that is similar to how he intended it to be for Sinatra. Sopranos creator David Chase liked the song so much that they decided to do a rock and roll version of it for the soundtrack to the 2012 film Not Fade Away. "I Don't Want to Go Home" is a cover of the 1976 Southside Johnny track from album of the same name. It was the first song Van Zandt ever wrote. While he was performing with the Dovells in 1973, he intended to give the song to Ben E. King but did not have the courage to. The last track on the album, "Ride the Night Away," was written for Jimmy Barnes' 1985 album For the Working Class Man.

== Release ==
On February 9, 2017, Van Zandt released "Saint Valentine's Day" as a single. The song was repeatedly played on Van Zandt's Underground Garage radio show.

Preorders for Soulfire began on April 7, 2017, through PledgeMusic. Preorder exclusives included signed merchandise such as CDs, 2-LP vinyl, t-shirts, signed test pressings, posters, drumheads, turntable mats, as well as a handwritten lyrics sheet and custom voicemail. Pledgers could also purchase a ticket to an exclusive listening session with Q&A. All preorders included a digital download of the album and instant access to "Saint Valentine's Day."

"Soulfire" was released as a single on April 21, 2017, while "Love on the Wrong Side of Town" was released on May 5, 2017, and "The Blues Is My Business" on May 12, 2017.

A special vinyl-only single of the Electric Flag's "Groovin' Is Easy" (an outtake from the album sessions) backed with a live version of the Van Zandt song "The Time of Your Life" (originally from the soundtrack of Nine Months) was released as part of the VIP ticket package for the 2017 Soulfire Tour.

== Track listing ==
All tracks are written by Stevie Van Zandt, except where noted

No.	Title	Writer(s)	Length
1.	"Soulfire"	Van Zandt, Anders Bruus	4:34
2.	"I'm Coming Back"		4:19
3.	"Blues Is My Business"	Kevin Bowe, Todd Cerney	6:23
4.	"I Saw the Light"		4:26
5.	"Some Things Just Don't Change"		4:04
6.	"Love on the Wrong Side of Town"	Van Zandt, Bruce Springsteen	3:51
7.	"The City Weeps Tonight"		3:30
8.	"Down and Out in New York City"	Bodie Chandler, Barry De Vorzon	6:27
9.	"Standing in the Line of Fire"	Van Zandt, Gary Anderson, Laurie C. Anderson	4:34
10.	"Saint Valentine's Day"		5:22
11.	"I Don't Want to Go Home"		4:21
12.	"Ride the Night Away"	Van Zandt, Steve Jordan	5:20

== Personnel ==
Credits adapted from the album's liner notes.

=== Musicians ===
- Stevie Van Zandt – vocals, rhythm guitar, guitar solos, arranger
- Marc Ribler – acoustic guitar, electric guitar, wah-wah pedal on "Down and Out in New York City", music director
- Jack Daley – bass
- Rich Mercurio – drums
- Andy Burton – Hammond B3, piano, Wurlitzer, reference strings, organ solo on "Blues Is My Business"
- Daniel Sadownick – percussion
- Clifford Carter – piano
- Ed Manion – baritone saxophone, horn transcriptions, additional arranger
- Stan Harrison – tenor saxophone, flute, flute solo on "Down and Out in New York City"
- Steven Salcedo – tenor saxophone
- Steven Jankowski – trumpet, trumpet solo on "Standing in the Line of Fire"
- Kent Smith – trumpet
- John Martin – trumpet
- Dan Nissenbaum – trumpet, trumpet solo on "Down and Out in New York City"
- Michael Davis – trombone
- Ian Gray – trombone, trombone solo on "Down and Out in New York City"
- Jonathan Dinklage – violin, viola, strings transcriptions, additional arranger
- Tawatha Agee, Elaine Caswell, Cindy Mizelle, LaJuan Carter, Martha Redbone, Audrey Martells – background vocals
- The Persuasions – background vocals on "The City Weeps Tonight" and "I Don't Want to Go Home"

=== Technical ===
- Stevie Van Zandt – producer
- Geoff Sanoff – producer, engineer
- Marc Ribler – producer, photography
- Tony Stanziano – assistant engineer
- Evan Stark – assistant engineer
- Bob Clearmountain – mixing
- Sergio Ruelas Jr. – mixing assistant
- Bob Ludwig – mastering
- Paul Osmolskis – production coordinator, photography
- Devanshi Kapadia, Dennis Mortensen, Jeremy Tufano – additional assistance
- Louis Arzonico – artwork, design
- Jo Lopez – cover photography
- Joanne Jefferson, Kathie Maniaci, Laura Balducci, Debra L. Rothenberg – photography

== Charts ==
Chart performance for Soulfire
Chart (2017)	Peak position
Belgian Albums (Ultratop Flanders)	72
Dutch Albums (Album Top 100)	80
German Albums (Offizielle Top 100)	74
Italian Albums (FIMI)	59
Spanish Albums (Promusicae)	95
Swiss Albums (Schweizer Hitparade)	61
US Top Album Sales (Billboard)	57
US Tastemaker Albums (Billboard)	15
