= Summer of Sorcery =

Studio album by Little Steven and the Disciples of Soul
- Released: May 3, 2019
- Recorded: September–October 2018
- Studios: Renegade Studio, New York City
- Genres: R&B, rock, blues, soul
- Length: 59:53
- Labels: Wicked Cool Records; UMe
- Producers: Steven Van Zandt; Geoff Sanoff; Marc Ribler

Little Steven and the Disciples of Soul chronology
Soulfire Live! (2017)	Summer of Sorcery (2019)	The Early Work (2019)

Singles from Summer of Sorcery
- 1. "Superfly Terraplane" Released: March 8, 2019; 2. "Communion" Released: April 5, 2019; 3. "A World of Our Own" Released: April 12, 2019; 4. "Love Again" Released: April 26, 2019

Professional ratings
Aggregate scores
Source	Rating
Metacritic	71/100
Review scores
Source	Rating
AllMusic	3.5/5 stars
American Songwriter	3.5/5 stars
Classic Rock	3.5/5 stars
Maximum Volume Music	9.5/10
The Spill Magazine	4/5 stars

Summer of Sorcery is the seventh solo studio album by American singer-songwriter Little Steven, released under the name Little Steven and the Disciples of Soul. It was released on May 3, 2019 under Universal Music Enterprises. It is Little Steven's first album of new material since 1999's Born Again Savage. The album consists of 10 new songs plus a reworking of "Education" from his 1989 Revolution album, and the outtake "Suddenly You" from the Lilyhammer score.

== Critical reception ==
According to the review aggregator Metacritic, Summer of Sorcery received "generally favorable reviews" based on a weighted average score of 71 out of 100 from 6 critic scores.

== Track listing ==
All tracks are written by Steven Van Zandt.

No.	Title	Length
1.	"Communion"	6:02
2.	"Party Mambo!"	4:33
3.	"Love Again"	4:35
4.	"Vortex"	4:47
5.	"A World of Our Own"	4:37
6.	"Gravity"	5:26
7.	"Soul Power Twist"	4:38
8.	"Superfly Terraplane"	4:32
9.	"Education"	4:51
10.	"Suddenly You"	3:05
11.	"I Visit the Blues"	4:38
12.	"Summer of Sorcery"	8:09

== Personnel ==
Little Steven and the Disciples of Soul

- Steven Van Zandt – vocals, guitar, arranger
- Marc Ribler – electric guitar, acoustic guitar, music director
- Andy Burton – B3 Hammond organ, piano, synthesizer
- Lowell "Banana" Levinger – piano, Wurlitzer electric piano
- Jack Daley – bass
- Rich Mercurio – drums
- Anthony Almonte – percussion
- Eddie Manion – baritone saxophone, horn director
- Stan Harrison – tenor saxophone, flute
- Clark Gayton – trombone
- Ravi Best – trumpet
- Ron Tooley – trumpet
- Jessie Wagner – backing vocals
- Sara Devine – backing vocals
- Tania Jones – backing vocals
- The Disciples of Soul – additional backing vocals, handclaps

Additional musicians

- Yeissonn Villamar – piano, backing vocals (track 2)
- Jorge González – bongos, cowbell, backing vocals (track 2)
- Juan Gerena – guiro, backing vocals (track 2)
- Luisito Quintero – timbales, backing vocals (track 2)
- Ryan Celli – backing vocals (track 2)
- Jonathan Dinklage – violin, viola (tracks 3–5, 12)
- Anja Wood – cello (tracks 3–5, 12)
- Joel Feitzinger – synth programming, vibraslap (track 4)
- Gary Trew – backing vocals, handclaps (track 8)
- Michael Wolf – keyboards (track 10)
- Matt McDonald – trombone (track 11)
- Duane Eddy – guitar (track 12)
- Sergio Ruelas Jr. – guitar (track 12)

Technical

- Steven Van Zandt – producer
- Geoff Sanoff – co-producer
- Marc Ribler – co-producer
- Joel Feitzinger – assistant co-producer
- Bob Clearmountain – mixing
- Sergio Ruelas Jr. – mixing assistant
- Bob Ludwig – mastering
- Louis Arzonico – art direction, design
- Carlo Massarini – sleeve photography
- Jeff Ross – back cover photography
- Ryan Celli – gatefold photography

== Charts ==
Chart	Peak position
Belgian Albums (Ultratop Flanders)	131
Belgian Albums (Ultratop Wallonia)	200
German Albums (Offizielle Top 100)	39
Scottish Albums (Official Charts)	18
Spanish Albums (Promusicae)	94
Swiss Albums (Schweizer Hitparade)	40
UK Albums (Official Charts)	94
UK Album Downloads (Official Charts)	92
