= Rock N Roll Rebel: The Early Work =

Box set by Little Steven
- Released: December 6, 2019 (LP + CD); July 31, 2020 (CD + DVD)
- Recorded: 1973–2019
- Genre: R&B, Rock, Pop, Soul, World
- Label: Wicked Cool Records; UMe
- Producer: Steven Van Zandt; Jean Beauvoir; Steve Thompson; Arthur Baker

Little Steven chronology
The Early Work (2019)	Rock N Roll Rebel: The Early Work (2019)	Macca to Mecca! Live at the Cavern Club, Liverpool (2021)

Rock N Roll Rebel: The Early Work is a box set collection by Little Steven (Steven Van Zandt), released on December 6, 2019. The set contains Van Zandt's first five studio albums remastered from the original master tapes for the first time ever. The box set also features 51 bonus tracks, including demos, studio outtakes, b-sides, remixes, and live tracks, many of which are previously unreleased. The set also includes the 1985 album Sun City by Van Zandt's protest supergroup Artists United Against Apartheid.

The initial release of the set contains seven vinyl LPs of the studio albums along with four CDs containing the 51 bonus tracks. The set was reissued on July 31, 2020, on CD format containing 10 CDs and 3 DVDs. Each DVD contains a concert from a different live tour between 1982 and 1987.

== Bonus tracks ==
In 2021, Steven Van Zandt said of the box set, "I'd gone 25 years without remastering anything. So I had to really say, "Hold on — wait a minute! Lets' take care of all of this old business here and get everything remastered, and maybe we'll find some extra tracks." And we found over 50." Among the tracks found were songs that "were not quite finished, but finished enough to put on the album", Van Zandt said, like "Time" and "Rock N Roll Rebel". The latter was originally slated to be the title track of his second album before it became Voice of America. The set also includes a 1973 audience tape recording of the Little Walter song "Who Told You" by Southside Johnny and the Kid (Van Zandt), who performed as a blues duo for a couple of months. In the late 1970s, Van Zandt acted as songwriter and producer for Southside Johnny and the Asbury Jukes, and seven rehearsal recordings plus a live recording, all featuring Van Zandt, are included in the box set.

"Inside of Me" was recorded live on French TV in 1983. Van Zandt wrote in the box set liner notes, "I was doing a TV interview in Paris and the cat says, "we have a piano here, why don't you do a song?" So I did. Never did a solo performance before, haven't done one since." Having written "It's Been a Long Time" for Southside Johnny and the Asbury Jukes' 1991 album Better Days, Van Zandt wanted to end the box set with the song, as it summed up his early years. "But every version we looked at had some approval complication or something wrong somewhere, and I really hate asking anybody for anything," he wrote in the liner notes, "so I borrowed a guitar and just did it."

== Track listing ==
All tracks are written by Steven Van Zandt, except where noted.

=== Original albums ===
Men Without Women (1982)
No.	Title	Length
1.	"Lyin' in a Bed of Fire"	4:23
2.	"Inside of Me"	5:03
3.	"Until the Good Is Gone"	4:01
4.	"Men Without Women"	2:49
5.	"Under the Gun"	3:59
6.	"Save Me"	4:52
7.	"Princess of Little Italy"	5:14
8.	"Angel Eyes"	4:32
9.	"Forever"	3:56
10.	"I've Been Waiting"	3:54
Total length:		42:36

Voice of America (1984)
No.	Title	Length
1.	"Voice of America"	3:30
2.	"Justice"	3:18
3.	"Checkpoint Charlie"	4:37
4.	"Solidarity"	3:26
5.	"Out of the Darkness"	4:34
6.	"Los Desaparecidos (The Disappeared Ones)"	5:15
7.	"Fear"	4:43
8.	"I Am a Patriot (And the River Opens for the Righteous)"	3:26
9.	"Among the Believers"	3:54
10.	"Undefeated (Everybody Goes Home)"	3:40
Total length:		40:58

Sun City (Artists United Against Apartheid) (1985)
No.	Title	Writer(s)	Length
1.	"Sun City"		7:12
2.	"No More Apartheid"	Artists United Against Apartheid	7:10
3.	"Revolutionary Situation"	Artists United Against Apartheid	6:06
4.	"Sun City (Version II) (Edit)"		5:45
5.	"Let Me See Your I.D."	Artists United Against Apartheid	7:30
6.	"The Struggle Continues"	Artists United Against Apartheid	7:05
7.	"Silver and Gold"	Bono	4:42
Total length:			45:32

Freedom – No Compromise (1987)
No.	Title	Length
1.	"Freedom"	5:14
2.	"Trail of Broken Treaties"	6:05
3.	"Pretoria"	5:16
4.	"Bitter Fruit"	6:18
5.	"No More Party's"	5:40
6.	"Can't You Feel the Fire"	4:38
7.	"Native American"	5:38
8.	"Sanctuary"	6:04
Total length:		44:48

Revolution (1989)
No.	Title	Length
1.	"Where Do We Go From Here?"	5:54
2.	"Revolution"	5:25
3.	"Education"	4:40
4.	"Balance"	5:16
5.	"Love and Forgiveness"	4:48
6.	"Newspeak"	5:22
7.	"Sexy"	4:04
8.	"Leonard Peltier"	3:46
9.	"Liberation Theology"	4:50
10.	"Discipline"	6:16
Total length:		50:17

Born Again Savage (1999)
No.	Title	Length
1.	"Born Again Savage"	4:38
2.	"Camouflage of Righteousness"	5:01
3.	"Guns, Drugs, and Gasoline"	4:59
4.	"Face of God"	7:38
5.	"Saint Francis"	8:17
6.	"Salvation"	5:09
7.	"Organize"	2:13
8.	"Flesheater"	6:07
9.	"Lust for Enlightenment"	8:38
10.	"Tongues of Angels"	8:19
Total length:		60:59

=== Bonus discs ===
Tracks marked with an asterisk (*) are previously unreleased.

Disc one – Men Without Women (And Before)
No.	Title	Writer(s)	Performer	Length
1.	"Rock N Roll Rebel" (studio track, 1983) (*)		Little Steven	5:02
2.	"Who Told You?" (live at Gulliver's Pub, Red Bank, NJ, June 15, 1973) (*)	Bernard Roth	Southside Johnny and the Kid	3:12
3.	"That's How It Feels" (live at Stone Pony, Asbury Park, NJ, May 30, 1976) (*)	Bobby Womack, Don Covay	Southside Johnny and the Asbury Jukes	5:37
4.	"When You Dance" (rehearsal, 1976) (*)	Van Zandt, Bruce Springsteen	Southside Johnny and the Asbury Jukes	3:39
5.	"Little Darlin'" (Stone Pony rehearsal, 1977) (*)		Southside Johnny and the Asbury Jukes	4:09
6.	"Ain't No Lady" (Stone Pony rehearsal, 1977) (*)		Southside Johnny and the Asbury Jukes	5:12
7.	"Love on the Wrong Side of Town" (Stone Pony rehearsal, 1977) (*)	Van Zandt, Springsteen	Southside Johnny and the Asbury Jukes	4:29
8.	"Little Girl So Fine" (rehearsal, 1976) (*)	Van Zandt, Springsteen	Southside Johnny and the Asbury Jukes	3:12
9.	"Some Things Just Don't Change" (Stone Pony rehearsal, 1977) (*)		Southside Johnny and the Asbury Jukes	3:49
10.	"She Got Me Where She Wants Me" (Stone Pony rehearsal, 1977) (*)		Southside Johnny and the Asbury Jukes	4:16
11.	"Men Without Women Radio Spot" (1982)		Little Steven and the Disciples of Soul	1:15
12.	"Angel Eyes" (Britt Row version, 1982) (*)		Little Steven and the Disciples of Soul	4:29
13.	"Forever" (Britt Row version, 1982) (*)		Little Steven and the Disciples of Soul	3:39
14.	"Until the Good Is Gone" (Britt Row version, 1982) (*)		Little Steven and the Disciples of Soul	4:52
15.	"I've Been Waiting" (early version, 1982) (*)		Little Steven and the Disciples of Soul	3:57
16.	"Caravan" (7" single, 1982)	Juan Tizol, Duke Ellington	Little Steven and the Disciples of Soul	3:57
17.	"Save Me" (live at Peppermint Lounge, New York, NY, July 18, 1982) (*)		Little Steven and the Disciples of Soul	5:06
18.	"Time" (studio track, 1982) (*)		Little Steven and the Disciples of Soul	5:01
Total length:				75:05

Disc two – Voice of America
No.	Title	Writer(s)	Performer	Length
1.	"This Time It's for Real" (live at Marquee Club, London, UK, October 18, 1982 / live at Peppermint Lounge, New York, NY, July 18, 1982) (*)		Little Steven and the Disciples of Soul	5:26
2.	"It's Possible" (studio track, date unknown) (*)		Little Steven	4:23
3.	"Vote! (That Mutha Out)" (12" single, 1984)		Little Steven	4:36
4.	"Vote! Part II" (rap version, 1984) (*)		Little Steven	6:56
5.	"Vote! Part III (After World War III)" (rap version, 12" single, 1984)		Little Steven	6:25
6.	"Vote! Part IV (Instrumental)" (12" single, 1984)		Little Steven	4:36
7.	"Vote! Part V" (rap version, 1984) (*)		Little Steven	5:11
8.	"Caravan" (live at Marquee Club, London, UK, October 18, 1982) (*)	Tizol, Ellington	Little Steven and the Disciples of Soul	4:17
9.	"I Don't Want to Go Home" (live at Marquee Club, London, UK, October 18, 1982) (*)		Little Steven and the Disciples of Soul	4:35
10.	"US Festival Radio Spot" (1983)		Little Steven	0:21
11.	"Alive for the First Time" (writing session, the birth of a song, 1983) (*)		Little Steven	9:10
12.	"Voice of America Radio Spot" (1984)		Little Steven	1:07
13.	"Out of the Darkness" (12" single, 1984)		Little Steven	5:31
14.	"Inside of Me" (live on French TV, 1983) (*)		Little Steven	5:14
Total length:				67:50

Disc three – Sun City
No.	Title	Writer(s)	Performer	Length
1.	"Let Me See Your I.D. (Extended Mix)" (12" single, 1985)	Artists United Against Apartheid	Artists United Against Apartheid	9:51
2.	"Let Me See Your I.D. (Street Mix)" (12" single, 1985)	Artists United Against Apartheid	Artists United Against Apartheid	6:42
3.	"Let Me See Your I.D. (Beat and Scratch Mix)" (12" single, 1985)	Artists United Against Apartheid	Artists United Against Apartheid	5:14
4.	"Not So Far Away (Dub Mix)" (UK 12" single, 1985)	Artists United Against Apartheid	Artists United Against Apartheid	5:56
5.	"Sun City (Last Remix)" (UK 12" Single, 1985)		Artists United Against Apartheid	9:36
6.	"Soweto Nights" (studio track, 1985) (*)	Tony Williams	Artists United Against Apartheid	4:58
7.	"The Struggle Continues" (extra Miles Davis version, 1985) (*)	Artists United Against Apartheid	Artists United Against Apartheid	9:51
Total length:				52:15

Disc four – Freedom - No Compromise, Revolution (And Later)
No.	Title	Writer(s)	Performer	Length
1.	"Bitter Fruit (Cana No Mas Dub)" (with Rubén Blades, UK 12" single, 1987)		Little Steven	6:48
2.	"Bitter Fruit (No Pasaran Mix)" (with Rubén Blades, UK 12" single, 1987)		Little Steven	8:18
3.	"Bitter Fruit (Platano Quemado Mix)" (with Rubén Blades, UK 12" single, 1987)		Little Steven	6:54
4.	"Fruta Amarga" (with Rubén Blades, Spanish 12" single, 1987)		Little Steven	5:53
5.	"No More Party's (For Those About to Party...)" (rock mix, 12" single, 1987)		Little Steven	5:38
6.	"No More Party's (Funky Party Edit)" (R&B mix, 12" single, 1987)		Little Steven	4:18
7.	"Vote Jesse In" (Jesse Jackson campaign song, 1988) (*)		Little Steven	4:45
8.	"Revolution (Naked City Mix)" (UK 12" single, 1989)		Little Steven	9:46
9.	"Revolution (Naked City Mix Part 2 - Maceo's Thang)" (UK 12" single, 1989)		Little Steven	5:44
10.	"I Wish It Would Rain" (Vin Scelsa Hungerthon, 1995) (*)	Rodger Penzabene, Barrett Strong, Norman Whitfield	Little Steven, Southside Johnny, Rusty Cloud, Bobby Bandiera, and David Hayes	3:15
11.	"Princess of Little Italy" (Vin Scelsa Hungerthon, 1995) (*)		Little Steven, Southside Johnny, Rusty Cloud, Bobby Bandiera, and David Hayes	6:04
12.	"It's Been a Long Time" (solo acoustic, 2019) (*)		Little Steven	4:16
Total length:				71:40

=== Live concert DVDs ===
Rockpalast • Live at Grugahalle: Essen, Germany - October 16, 1982
No.	Title	Writer(s)	Length
1.	"Intro"
2.	"Lyin' in a Bed of Fire"
3.	"Save Me"
4.	"Forever"
5.	"Inside of Me"
6.	"Take It Inside"
7.	"Until the Good Is Gone"
8.	"Princess of Little Italy"
9.	"Caravan"	Juan Tizol, Duke Ellington
10.	"Under the Gun"
11.	"I Played the Fool"
12.	"I Don't Want to Go Home"
13.	"Angel Eyes"
14.	"This Time It's for Real"
15.	"Can I Get a Witness"	Brian Holland, Lamont Dozier, Eddie Holland
16.	"Closing Credits"
Total length:			79:31

Rockpalast • Live at Loreley: Sankt Goarshausen, Germany - August 25, 1984
No.	Title	Length
1.	"Peter Rüchel Intro"
2.	"Voice of America"
3.	"Justice"
4.	"Save Me"
5.	"Fear"
6.	"Lyin' in a Bed of Fire"
7.	"I Am a Patriot (And the River Opens for the Righteous)"
8.	"Solidarity"
9.	"Under the Gun"
10.	"Checkpoint Charlie"
11.	"Los Desaparecidos (The Disappeared Ones)"
12.	"Out of the Darkness"
13.	"Undefeated (Everybody Goes Home)"
14.	"Men Without Women"
15.	"Forever"
16.	"Princess of Little Italy"
17.	"Angel Eyes"
18.	"Closing Credits"
19.	"Peter Rüchel Interview with Little Steven"
Total length:		99:04

Live at the Ritz, New York, New York - October 8, 1987
No.	Title	Length
1.	"Freedom"
2.	"Sanctuary"
3.	"Under the Gun"
4.	"Los Desaparecidos (The Disappeared Ones)"
5.	"I Am a Patriot (And the River Opens for the Righteous)"
6.	"Pretoria"
7.	"Fear"
8.	"Trail of Broken Treaties"
9.	"Bitter Fruit"
10.	"Checkpoint Charlie"
11.	"Vote!"
12.	"No More Party's"
13.	"Undefeated (Everybody Goes Home)"
14.	"Native American" (featuring Bruce Springsteen)
15.	"Sun City" (featuring Bruce Springsteen)
Total length:		98:01

== Personnel ==
Adapted from the box set liner notes. See original albums for full credits.

Bonus discs

- Little Steven – producer, executive producer
- Steve Berkowitz – co-executive producer
- Louis Arzonico – co-executive producer, packaging, art, design
- Jean Beauvoir – co-producer (disc 2: tracks 3–7)
- Steve Thompson – co-producer (disc 2: tracks 4–7), mixing (disc 2: tracks 3–7, disc 4: tracks 1–4)
- Arthur Baker – co-producer (disc 3), mixing (disc 3: tracks 1–3), remixing (disc 3: tracks 4, 5)
- Paul Courtney – engineer (disc 1: track 2)
- Robert Bader – tape restoration, mixing, mastering (disc 1: track 2)
- Toby Scott – engineer (disc 1: tracks 12–14, 16, 17, disc 2: track 1)
- Bob Clearmountain – mixing (disc 1: tracks 12–17, disc 2: tracks 1, 13)
- Zoë Yanakis – engineer (disc 2: tracks 3–7)
- Steven Escallier – engineer (disc 2: tracks 3–7)
- Paul Ray – engineer (disc 2: tracks 3–7)
- Dominic Maita – engineer (disc 2: tracks 3–7)
- Michael Krowiak – engineer (disc 2: tracks 3–7)
- Greg Calbi – original mastering (disc 2: tracks 3–7)
- Chris Lord-Alge – mixing, additional engineer (disc 3: tracks 1–3), remixing (disc 4: tracks 1–4)
- Jay Burnett – mixing (disc 3: tracks 1–5), additional engineer (disc 3: tracks 1–3), remixing (disc 3: tracks 4, 5)
- Aldo Marin – mixing (disc 3: tracks 1–3), editing (disc 3: tracks 1–5)
- John Davenport – additional engineer (disc 3: tracks 1–3)
- Albert Cabrera – editing (disc 3: tracks 1–5)
- Keith LeBlanc – editing (disc 3: tracks 1–3)
- Herb Powers – original mastering (disc 3: tracks 1–3)
- Frank Filipetti – mixing (disc 3: tracks 4, 5)
- Michael Barbiero – mixing (disc 2: tracks 3–7, disc 4: tracks 1–4)
- Steven Rinkoff – mixing (disc 4: track 5)
- Bruce Forest – mixing (disc 4: track 6)
- Frank Heller – mixing (disc 4: track 6)
- David McNair – engineer, mixing (disc 4: tracks 8, 9)
- Greg Smith – engineer, mixing (disc 4: tracks 8, 9)
- Keith Freedman – engineer (disc 4: tracks 8, 9)
- Chris Shaw – additional mixing (disc 1: tracks 1, 12–15, 17, 18, disc 2: tracks 1, 8, 9)
- Bob Ludwig – remastering
- Holly Cara Price – archival producer
- Rich Russo – archival producer
- Glenn Korman – tape research, archiving
- Kevin Przybylowski – archival transfers, digitizing

DVDs

Rockpalast: Live at Grugahalle: Essen, Germany - October 16, 1982

- Little Steven – vocals, guitar
- Jean Beauvoir – bass
- Benjamin King – keyboards
- Dino Danelli – drums
- Richie "LaBamba" Rosenberg – trombone
- Crispin Cioe – baritone saxophone
- Arno Hecht – tenor saxophone, flute
- Paul Litteral – trumpet
- Nelson Bogart – trumpet
- Monti Louis Ellison – percussion
- Zoë Yanakis – oboe

Rockpalast: Live at Loreley: Sankt Goarshausen, Germany - August 25, 1984

- Little Steven – vocals, guitar
- Jean Beauvoir – guitar
- Gary Tibbs - bass
- David Rosenthal - keyboards
- Dino Danelli - drums

Live at the Ritz, New York, New York - October 8, 1987

- Little Steven – vocals, guitar
- Pat Thrall – guitar
- T. M. Stevens – bass
- Mark Alexander – keyboards
- Leslie Ming – drums
