= Voice of America (disambiguation) =

Voice of America is an American international radio and television network

Voice of America may also refer to:

- Voice of America (Frith, Ostertag and Minton album), 1982
- Voice of America (Little Steven album), 1984
- The Voice of America (album), a 1980 album by Cabaret Voltaire
- "Voice of America", a song by Asia from their 1985 album Astra
- The Voice of America, pre-production working title of The Voice (American TV series)

== See also ==
- VOA (disambiguation)
- America's Voice (disambiguation)
