= The Miami Horns =

US musical group

- Origin: New Jersey, U.S.
- Years active: 1976–present
- Members: Richie "La Bamba" Rosenberg (trombone); Mark Pender (trumpet); Eddie Manion (saxophones)
- Past members: Tenor Sax; Bob Malach, Stan Harrison, Jerry Vivino; Saxophone; Carlo Novi, Ed De Palma, Joey Stann, Mario Cruz, Bud Matlin, Frank Elmo; Trumpet; Rick Gazda, Deacon Earl Gardener, Tony Pallagrosi, Alan Chez , John Binkley, Steve Paraczky, Bob Mucklin, Nelson Bogart, Mike Spengler, Chris Anderson; Baritone Sax; Bill Zazagni; Trombone; Louie Parente, Dennis Orlock

The Miami Horns are an American horn section best known for touring and recording with Southside Johnny, Bruce Springsteen, Little Steven and The Max Weinberg 7. They have also toured, performed or recorded with, among others, Diana Ross, Gary U.S. Bonds, Robert Cray, Bon Jovi, Cissy Houston, Joe Cocker, Dave Edmunds, Darlene Love, The Allman Brothers Band, Eric Clapton, Sheryl Crow and Ricky Martin. As individuals, the various members have also worked with the likes of Aerosmith, David Bowie, Duran Duran, Power Station, Graham Parker, and They Might Be Giants.

The Miami Horns were first put together in 1976 by Steven Van Zandt as part of Southside Johnny and the Asbury Jukes. The connection with the city of Miami is only tenuous. Van Zandt had acquired the nickname Miami, due to his dislike of winter, and consequently the horn section also became known by that name. On occasions they have also been billed as The Jukes' Horns, La Bamba's Mambomen, The U.S. Horns, The J.A.M. Horns, The Tunnel Of Love Horns, The Horns of Love and The Late Night Horns. The line-up is very much impromptu and seems to depend on who is available at the time.

Many performers have come and gone, and even returned. However Richie "La Bamba" Rosenberg (trombone), Mark Pender (trumpet) and Eddie Manion (saxophone) have been the most consistent members. Other notable players have included Stan Harrison, Chris Anderson, Joey Stann and Mario Cruz, Alan Chez. . In 1991 Rosenberg, Pender, Manion and Harrison recorded an eponymous album as La Bamba & The Hubcaps.

== Southside Johnny and the Asbury Jukes ==
In January 1976, Steven Van Zandt set about finding a record deal for Southside Johnny and the Asbury Jukes. As well as being a full-time member of the E Street Band, Van Zandt also acted as a singer, guitarist, songwriter, manager, producer and arranger for the band, which he and Southside Johnny had co-founded in the early part of 1975. At the time, the Jukes horn section consisted of just one permanent member - sax player Carlo Novi. However, for the recording of their debut release, I Don't Want To Go Home, Van Zandt put together a horn section consisting of Rick Gazda (trumpet), Bob Malach (tenor sax), Deacon Earl Gardener (trumpet), Bill Zacagni (baritone sax) and Louie Parente (trombone). This quintet formed the original Miami Horns line up. However, with the exception of Rick Gazda, they all went their separate ways in March 1976 once the album had been finished. Bob Malach would briefly return in 1977 to play a solo on the second Jukes album, This Time It's for Real.

On May 30, 1976, the Jukes celebrated the release of I Don't Want To Go Home with a show at The Stone Pony. It was broadcast live on nine radio stations, including WMMR, and featured guest appearances by Ronnie Spector, Lee Dorsey, Bruce Springsteen, and various members of the E Street Band. By this time, a new Miami Horns line up consisted of Carlo Novi (tenor sax), Eddie Manion (baritone sax), Tony Pallagrosi (trumpet) and Rick Gazda (trumpet). They eventually grew into a five-piece with the arrival of Richie "La Bamba" Rosenberg (trombone) in November 1976 and went on to tour and record regularly with Southside Johnny during the 1970s. They featured prominently on the album Hearts of Stone. In 1991 they also featured on Better Days, effectively a Jukes reunion album, produced by Van Zandt. It also featured guest appearances by Springsteen, Jon Bon Jovi and honorary Jukes, Max Weinberg and Garry Tallent. The horns were provided by Rosenberg, Pender, Manion, Gazda, Joey Stann, Frank Elmo and for the first time, Jerry Vivino.

== Bruce Springsteen ==
The Miami Horns first toured with Bruce Springsteen & the E Street Band in 1976 and 1977 during the latter stages of the Born to Run tour. For many years it was assumed that that horns line-up for this tour was the same quintet that featured on I Don't Want To Go Home. However research by the Asbury Jukes historian, Mike Saunders, revealed that the horns were actually provided by two separate quartets, both billed as the Miami Horns. The first quartet consisted of Carlo Novi (tenor sax), Eddie Manion (baritone sax), Tony Palligrosi (trumpet) and Rick Gazda (trumpet). They made their debut with Springsteen on August 1 at the Monmouth Arts Centre in Red Bank, New Jersey. At the time Southside Johnny & The Asbury Jukes where temporarily inactive due to Southside Johnny suffering from an illness. However, by September, Southside was fully recovered and Novi, Manion, Palligrossi and Gazda rejoined the Jukes. A second Miami Horns was then recruited to accompany Springsteen and the E Street Band. This line up featured Ed De Palma (sax), Dennis Orlock (trombone), John Binkley (trumpet) and Steve Paraczky (trumpet) and were based out of Philadelphia. They made their debut with Springsteen at the Arizona Veterans Memorial Coliseum on September 26 and continued to tour with him until March 1977.

On the Born in the U.S.A. Tour the Miami Horns, featuring Richie "La Bamba" Rosenberg (trombone), Mark Pender (trumpet), Eddie Manion (baritone sax), Mike Spengler (trumpet) and Stan Harrison (tenor sax), made a guest appearance at the Meadowlands Arena on August 20, 1984; they featured prominently on Dobie Gray's "Drift Away", performed as a duet by Springsteen and Little Steven, and on "Tenth Avenue Freeze-Out". This version of the latter song was later featured on Live/1975-85. On August 22 Springsteen returned the favour when he guested with La Bamba & The Hubcaps during a show at The Stone Pony. The Tunnel Of Love Express Tour of 1988 featured a horn section much more prominently. Rosenberg, Manion, Pender, Spengler and Mario Cruz, sometimes referred to as The Tunnel Of Love Horns or The Horns of Love, accompanied Springsteen throughout the tour. On September 19, 1988 at the JFK Stadium they also made a guest appearance during the Human Rights Now! Tour. On June 24, 1993, during The "Other Band" Tour they also guested once again at Meadowlands Arena.

They have been featured on The Rising and We Shall Overcome: The Seeger Sessions. Rosenberg, Manion and Pender also toured with Springsteen as part of The Seeger Sessions Band and subsequently featured on Live In Dublin. They also played with Springsteen at the halftime show during Super Bowl XLIII.

A photo of The Miami Horns playing behind Springsteen and the E Street Band at the Boston Music Hall on March 24, 1977 can be found here:

In 2012, Eddie Manion joined Springsteen and the E Street Band's new horn section for their Wrecking Ball Tour as a replacement for the late Clarence Clemons. As of 2014, Manion still remains part of the recording and touring horn section for Springsteen.

== Little Steven ==
As well as arranging the horn parts when they toured and recorded with Southside Johnny and Bruce Springsteen, Steve Van Zandt has also used the Miami Horns when he produced for other artists. In 1981 he used them on Dedication, an album he produced for Gary U.S. Bonds, and they then featured prominently on his own debut Men Without Women. This was released under the name Little Steven & The Disciples Of Soul and the horns were credited as La Bamba's Mambomen. They also toured to promote the album. Van Zandt also used the horns on "All Alone on Christmas", a single he wrote and produced for Darlene Love which was also featured on the Home Alone 2: Lost in New York soundtrack.

== The Max Weinberg 7 and The Tonight Show Band ==
In 1993 Max Weinberg became music director for Late Night with Conan O'Brien and when putting together a band, he recruited Rosenberg, Pender and Jerry Vivino. The three played until 2009 as members of The Max Weinberg 7, which moved that year with Conan O'Brien to become the latest iteration of The Tonight Show Band. When not on TV, this trio has worked regularly as session musicians. In 2010, the trio toured North America as part of the Legally Prohibited Band (essentially The Tonight Show Band under a different name, with Weinberg's place taken by James Wormwood) in support of Conan O'Brien's 32-city "Legally Prohibited From Being Funny On Television" tour. They continued to be part of O'Brien's late night band as part of the Basic Cable Band on O'Brien's current show, Conan, until the band was removed from the show when O'Brien moved to a different format in 2019.

== Other artists ==
In the early 1980s Southside Johnny temporarily broke up The Asbury Jukes, and the Miami Horns, featuring Mark Pender for the first time, went on tour with Diana Ross. Touring with Springsteen raised the profile of The Miami Horns and led to more work, including sessions with Joe Cocker. In 1989 they also toured as part of Dave Edmunds' Rock 'n' Roll Review which also featured Graham Parker, Dion, Kim Wilson and Steve Cropper. In October 1991 they played at the Legends Of Guitar Festival in Seville, performing with such artists as Keith Richards, Bob Dylan, Jack Bruce, Robert Cray, Phil Manzanera, Robbie Robertson, Albert Collins, B.B. King, Bo Diddley and again with Edmunds and Cropper. The concert was broadcast live on TVE2 and some of the recordings also appeared on the Manzanera album Million Reasons Why. Manion and Pender also played and arranged horns on the acclaimed Robert Cray album, Shame + A Sin and between 1991 and 1994, Manion was a full-time member of The Robert Cray Band.

== Discography ==
- Southside Johnny & The Asbury Jukes
  - I Don't Want To Go Home (1976)
  - Live At the Bottom Line (1976)
  - This Time It's for Real (1977)
  - Hearts of Stone (1978)
  - The Jukes (1979)
  - Love Is a Sacrifice (1980)
  - Reach Up and Touch the Sky (1981)
  - Trash It Up! (1983)
  - In the Heat (1984)
  - At Least We've Got Shoes (1986)
  - Better Days (1991)
  - Messin' With the Blues (2000)
  - Goin' To Jukesville (2002)
  - Into the Harbour (2005)
- Southside Johnny & La Bamba's Big Band
  - Grapefruit Moon: The Songs of Tom Waits (2008)
- Bruce Springsteen
  - Live/1975-85 (1986)
  - Chimes of Freedom (1988)
  - Tracks (1998)
  - 18 Tracks (1998)
  - The Rising (2002)
  - We Shall Overcome: The Seeger Sessions (2006)
  - Live In Dublin (2007)
- Gary U.S. Bonds
  - Dedication (1981)
  - Standing In the Line of Fire (1984)
- Debbie Davies
  - Picture This (1993)
  - Loose Tonight (1994)
- Phil Manzanera
  - Manzanera Collection (1995)
  - Million Reasons Why (1997)
- Jon Spencer Blues Explosion
  - Talkin' About The Blues (1998)
  - Xtra Acme USA (1999)
  - Emergency Call From Japan (1999)
  - Magical Colours (2000)
- Selected Others
  - Various artists: The Sounds Of Asbury Park (1980)
  - Little Steven & The Disciples Of Soul: Men Without Women (1982)
  - Power Station: The Power Station (1985)
  - J.A.M: We've Got The Love / Save Love, Save Life (1986)
  - Joe Cocker: One Night Of Sin (1989)
  - La Bamba & The Hubcaps: La Bamba & The Hubcaps (1991)
  - Killer Joe: Scene Of The Crime (1991)
  - Tyler Collins: Tyler (1992)
  - Various artists: Home Alone 2: Lost in New York (1992) (soundtrack)
  - Robert Cray: Shame + A Sin (1993)
  - Bon Jovi: These Days (1995)
  - Cissy Houston: He Leadeth Me (1997)
  - New York Voices: The Songs Of Paul Simon (1997)
  - Joe Pesci: Vincent Laguardia Gambine (1998)
  - Various artists: Where Have All The Flowers Gone (1998)
  - Lucky Peterson: Lucky Peterson (1999)
  - Various artists: A Very Special Christmas Live (1999)
  - Son Seals: Lettin' Go (1999)
  - The Max Weinberg 7: The Max Weinberg 7 (2000)
  - Ricky Martin: Sound Loaded (2001)
  - Various artists: Autofocus (2002)(soundtrack)
  - Sherie Rene: Men I've Had (2002)
  - Various artists: Camp (2003)(soundtrack)
  - Sinner: There Will Be Execution (2003)
  - Joe D'Urso & The Stone Caravan: Both Sides Of Life (2003)
  - Bradley Cole: In Our Time (2004)
  - Sean Costello': Sean Costello (2004)
