= Soulfire Live! =

Live album by Little Steven and the Disciples of Soul
- Released: April 27, 2018 (digital edition); January 29, 2021 (expanded edition)
- Recorded: 2017
- Venue: Various venues in North America and Europe
- Genre: R&B, rock, blues, soul
- Length: 154:59
- Label: Wicked Cool Records
- Producer: Steven Van Zandt

Little Steven and the Disciples of Soul chronology
Soulfire (2017)	Soulfire Live! (2018)	Summer of Sorcery (2019)

Soulfire Live! is the first live album released by Little Steven and the Disciples of Soul in 2018. The album was recorded during various live performances on the Soulfire tour in 2017. While the initial April 2018 release of the album was digital-only, deluxe versions of the album were reissued on CD (three CDs) in August 2018 and vinyl (seven LPs) in February 2019, containing additional songs recorded during the tour. A Blu-ray edition was also released, containing video of all of the tracks present on the digital, CD, and vinyl editions. An "expanded edition" of the album containing four CDs of material was released on January 29, 2021.

== Track listing ==
=== Digital edition ===
No.	Title	Writer(s)	Length
1.	"Mike Stoller Intro"		2:05
2.	"Soulfire"	Steven Van Zandt, Anders Bruus	4:31
3.	"I'm Coming Back"	Van Zandt	4:17
4.	"Blues Is My Business (Intro)"		2:08
5.	"Blues Is My Business"	Kevin Bowe, Todd Cerney	9:04
6.	"Love on the Wrong Side of Town"	Van Zandt, Bruce Springsteen	4:02
7.	"Until the Good Is Gone (Intro)"		0:51
8.	"Until the Good Is Gone"	Van Zandt	9:30
9.	"Angel Eyes"	Van Zandt	5:04
10.	"Some Things Just Don't Change"	Van Zandt	6:41
11.	"Saint Valentine's Day (Intro)"		0:12
12.	"Saint Valentine's Day"	Van Zandt	5:48
13.	"Standing in the Line of Fire (Intro)"		0:12
14.	"Standing in the Line of Fire"	Van Zandt, Gary Anderson, Laurie C. Anderson	4:49
15.	"I Saw the Light"	Van Zandt	4:43
16.	"Salvation"	Van Zandt	6:15
17.	"The City Weeps Tonight (Intro)"		4:19
18.	"The City Weeps Tonight"	Van Zandt	4:19
19.	"Down and Out in New York City"	Bodie Chandler, Barry De Vorzon	12:16
20.	"Princess of Little Italy (Intro)"		2:41
21.	"Princess of Little Italy"	Van Zandt	6:12
22.	"Solidarity"	Van Zandt	6:26
23.	"Leonard Peltier"	Van Zandt	2:58
24.	"I Am a Patriot (And the River Opens for the Righteous)"	Van Zandt	4:11
25.	"Groovin' Is Easy"	Nick Gravenites	4:28
26.	"Ride the Night Away (Intro)"		0:16
27.	"Ride the Night Away"	Van Zandt, Steve Jordan	5:28
28.	"Bitter Fruit"	Van Zandt	8:20
29.	"Forever"	Van Zandt	4:32
30.	"Checkpoint Charlie (Intro)"		1:34
31.	"Checkpoint Charlie"	Van Zandt	4:52
32.	"I Don't Want to Go Home"	Van Zandt	4:37
33.	"Out of the Darkness (Intro)"		0:24
34.	"Out of the Darkness"	Van Zandt	5:34
Total length:			154:59

Note

- The CD and vinyl edition omits "Until the Good Is Gone (Intro)".

=== CD and vinyl bonus tracks ===
Bonus tracks!
No.	Title	Writer(s)	Length
1.	"Even the Losers" (October 26, 2017 - Fort Lauderdale, FL, WZFL Revolution Live)	Tom Petty	3:26
2.	"Can't Be So Bad" (feat. Jerry Miller, October 15, 2017 - Seattle, WA, Showbox SoDo)	Jerry Miller, Don Stevenson	5:20
3.	"You Shook Me All Night Long" (November 20, 2017 - Oslo, Norway, Rockefeller Music Hall)	Angus Young, Malcolm Young, Brian Johnson	3:53
4.	"Working Class Hero" (October 9, 2017 - Toronto, Canada, Danforth Music Hall)	John Lennon	4:06
5.	"We Gotta Get Out of This Place" (November 16, 2017 - Newcastle, England, O2 Academy)	Barry Mann, Cynthia Weil	4:14
6.	"Can I Get a Witness" (feat. Richie Sambora, October 19, 2017 - Los Angeles, CA, Orpheum Theatre)	Brian Holland, Lamont Dozier, Eddie Holland	6:08
7.	"It's Not My Cross to Bear (Intro)"		0:20
8.	"It's Not My Cross to Bear" (September 21, 2017 - Holmdel, NJ, Laid Back Festival, PNC Bank Arts Center)	Gregg Allman	5:16
9.	"Freeze Frame" (feat. Peter Wolf, December 21, 2017, Brooklyn, NY, Brooklyn Bowl)	Seth Justman, Peter Wolf	4:26
10.	"The Time of Your Life" (May 27, 2017 - Red Bank, NJ, Count Basie Theatre)	Van Zandt	6:25
11.	"Tenth Avenue Freeze-Out" (feat. Bruce Springsteen, September 21, 2017 - Holmdel, NJ, Laid Back Festival, PNC Bank Arts Center)	Bruce Springsteen	4:56
12.	"I Don't Want to Go Home" (feat. Bruce Springsteen, May 27, 2017 - Red Bank, NJ, Count Basie Theatre)	Van Zandt	4:53
13.	"Merry Christmas (I Don't Want to Fight Tonight)" (December 8, 2017 - Madrid, Spain, Palacio Vistalegre)	Joey Ramone	5:50
Total length:			59:28

=== Expanded edition CD and vinyl bonus tracks ===
Macca To Mecca!
No.	Title	Writer(s)	Length
1.	"I Saw Her Standing There (Intro)"		0:44
2.	"I Saw Her Standing There" (feat. Paul McCartney, November 4, 2017 - London, England, Roundhouse)	Lennon, Paul McCartney	4:06
3.	"Cavern Club Intro"		0:44
4.	"Magical Mystery Tour" (November 14, 2017 - Liverpool, England, The Cavern Club)	Lennon, McCartney	2:58
5.	"Boys" (November 14, 2017 - Liverpool, England, The Cavern Club)	Luther Dixon, Wes Farrell	3:43
6.	"Slow Down (Intro)"		1:31
7.	"Slow Down" (November 14, 2017 - Liverpool, England, The Cavern Club)	Larry Williams	3:26
8.	"Some Other Guy" (November 14, 2017 - Liverpool, England, The Cavern Club)	Jerry Leiber, Mike Stoller, Richard Barrett	2:38
9.	"Soldier of Love (Intro)"		0:39
10.	"Soldier of Love" (November 14, 2017 - Liverpool, England, The Cavern Club)	Buzz Cason, Tony Moon	2:52
11.	"Good Morning Good Morning" (November 14, 2017 - Liverpool, England, The Cavern Club)	Lennon, McCartney	2:24
12.	"Got to Get You Into My Life" (November 14, 2017 - Liverpool, England, The Cavern Club)	Lennon, McCartney	3:25
13.	"All You Need Is Love" (November 14, 2017 - Liverpool, England, The Cavern Club)	Lennon, McCartney	4:56
14.	"Birthday" (November 8, 2017 - Leeds, England, O2 Academy)	Lennon, McCartney	2:50
Total length:			36:50

== Personnel ==
Little Steven and the Disciples of Soul

- Steven Van Zandt – vocals, guitar, arranger
- Marc Ribler – guitar, slide guitar, music director
- Rich Mercurio – drums
- Jack Daley – bass
- Andy Burton – B3 organ, accordion, synthesizers
- Lowell "Banana" Levinger – piano, mandolin, esraj
- Eddie Manion – baritone saxophone, horn director
- Stan Harrison – tenor saxophone, alto saxophone, flute, oboe
- Clark Gayton – trombone
- Ravi Best – trumpet
- Ron Tooley – trumpet
- Anthony Almonte – percussion
- JaQuita May – backing vocals
- Sara Devine – backing vocals
- Tania Jones – backing vocals

Additional musicians

- Charley Drayton – drums (on "The Time of Your Life" and "I Don't Want to Go Home")
- Everett Bradley – percussion (on "The Time of Your Life" and "I Don't Want to Go Home")
- Jessica Wagner – backing vocals (on "The Time of Your Life" and "I Don't Want to Go Home")
- Erika Jerry – backing vocals (on "The Time of Your Life" and "I Don't Want to Go Home")
- Yahzarah – backing vocals (on "The Time of Your Life" and "I Don't Want to Go Home")

Guests

- Mike Stoller – introduction (on "Mike Stoller Intro")
- Jerry Miller – vocals, guitar (on "Can't Be So Bad")
- Richie Sambora – vocals, guitar (on "Can I Get a Witness")
- Peter Wolf – vocals (on "Freeze Frame")
- Bruce Springsteen – vocals (on "Tenth Avenue Freeze-Out" and "I Don't Want to Go Home")
- Paul McCartney – vocals, guitar (on "I Saw Her Standing There")

Technical

- Steven Van Zandt – producer
- Geoff Sanoff – assistant producer
- Richard Sharratt – engineer
- Bob Clearmountain – mixing
- Sergio Ruelas Jr. – mixing assistant
- Bob Ludwig – mastering
- Louis Arzonico – artwork, design
