= Freedom – No Compromise =

Freedom - No Compromise

Studio album by Little Steven
- Released: May 12, 1987
- Recorded: 1985–1986
- Studios: Shakedown Sound Studios, NYC; Atlantic Recording, NYC; Power Station, NYC; The Village Recorder, LA; Record Plant, LA; Rumbo Recorders, LA; Cherokee Studios, LA
- Genres: Dance-rock; world
- Length: 44:29
- Label: EMI
- Producer: Little Steven

Little Steven chronology
Voice of America (1984)	Freedom - No Compromise (1987)	Revolution (1989)

Singles from Freedom - No Compromise
- 1. "Bitter Fruit" Released: May 1987; 2. "No More Party's" Released: September 1987; 3. "Trail of Broken Treaties" Released: October 1987

Professional ratings
Review scores
Source	Rating
AllMusic	3/5 stars
Robert Christgau	C
Kerrang!	4/5 stars

Freedom – No Compromise is the third solo studio album by Little Steven, released in May 1987 by EMI.

Following on the moderate success of Artists United Against Apartheid's "Sun City" in 1985, Steven Van Zandt's next record was a full-on dance-rock record, verging in places on world music. Bruce Springsteen and Rubén Blades join Van Zandt on lead vocals on "Native American" and "Bitter Fruit", respectively. Politics were even more at the forefront than before, centering on U.S. transgressions in Central America, South Africa, and against Native Americans. By this time, the old Disciples of Soul band had almost completely disappeared.

In 2019, the album was remastered for release as part of Van Zandt's career-spanning box set Rock N Roll Rebel: The Early Work. The digital deluxe edition of the album was released on November 29, 2019 containing five bonus tracks, along with the reissued Bitter Fruit bonus EP.

== Background ==
Most of Freedom - No Compromise was written during the fall of 1984 and was recorded at seven different studios in New York City and Los Angeles between early 1985 and late 1986. Van Zandt took time out from the sessions for other projects, which included the Sun City album and film (The Making of Sun City), anti-apartheid and Amnesty International concerts, and the co-writing and co-production of Lone Justice's 1986 Shelter album. Freedom - No Compromise features contributions from a wide array of guests and session musicians.

Thematically, Freedom - No Compromise mostly deals with the struggles for freedom and self-determination in South Africa, Central America, and among Native Americans. Van Zandt wanted album opener "Freedom" to be really simple: "State the horror and oppression that surrounds us, speaking as a member of the oppressors, and do it in as few lyrics as possible," he said in a 1987 interview. "I like the album's overall theme to be very direct in the first song, and then get into specific things in the later songs." He said that the background context is the foreign policy of the United States, which he believes is "the underlying problem throughout most of the world."

"Trail of Broken Treaties" concerns the mistreatment of Native Americans and features long-time Tina Turner pianist and collaborator Kenny Moore singing all the harmony parts on the track. Van Zandt had seen him perform with Turner on her Private Dancer Tour in 1984: "And I'm hearing Tina, plus what sounds like another Tina, singing the harmony above her. When it came time to record I remembered him and we tracked him down in L.A." Van Zandt described "Native American" as the other side of "Trail of Broken Treaties." In "Native American", he tried to "capture a moment of the uncomplicated beauty and integrity of Native American people." The track features Bruce Springsteen on guest lead vocals. "He and I split up the lyric lines and I sang the high parts like I used to do when we sang together," Van Zandt said.

"Pretoria" is the South African situation from a different perspective emotionally, according to Van Zandt: "The dignity, patience, and integrity of these people survive somehow - and they manage not to be angry or bitter."

The title of "Bitter Fruit" is taken from Stephen Schlesinger and Stephen Kinzer's 1982 book Bitter Fruit: The Story of the American Coup in Guatemala, which Van Zandt read when he was doing research into U.S. foreign policy. He said in 1987, "[the book] dug into the 1954 coup in Guatemala, which the more I read about the more I realized was a good example of what we're continuing to do in Latin America — basically engaging in a conspiracy between the CIA, the U.S. State Department, multi-national corporations, and the military to overthrow a government talking about land reform, and selling it to the American public as policing a communist threat." The song describes the exploitation of workers by big business and features Panama-born singer Rubén Blades on guest lead vocals. When Blades came in to record his vocal part, he felt that the track needed one more percussion part. "So he picked up a mike stand and drumstick," Van Zandt recalled, "and tapped out this great rhythm, which is now a central part of the song."

On "Sanctuary," Van Zandt criticizes the U.S. for not living up to the ideals upon which the country was founded. The song is based upon the Sanctuary movement, a religious and political campaign in the U.S., who give sanctuary to Latin American political refugees who've been denied asylum in the U.S. "It's outrageous that these providers of sanctuary are being arrested and jailed for fulfilling something they believe is a sacred religious duty and a moral obligation," he said.

"No More Party's" introduces a change of pace emotionally. "My version of comic relief, you might say," Van Zandt said. The track is his attempt at providing perspective and presenting his idealistic view of the world, dealing with different political parties and ideologies. "I wanted to go into a broader sort of statement, having more to do with my own philosophy than any specific issue and have some fun with the double entendre." "Can't You Feel the Fire" is about motivation and, "in the end, hopefully motivational," Van Zandt explained. While "No More Party's" is more ideological, "Can't You Feel the Fire" is more emotional. Both songs make up an ongoing theme that is present in much of his work, according to Van Zandt: "We must stop letting other people do our thinking for us."

== Track listing ==
All songs written and arranged by Little Steven

1. "Freedom" - 5:14
2. "Trail of Broken Treaties" - 6:05
3. "Pretoria" - 5:16
4. "Bitter Fruit" - 6:18
5. "No More Party's" - 5:40
6. "Can't You Feel the Fire" - 4:38
7. "Native American" - 5:38
8. "Sanctuary" - 6:04

=== 2019 digital deluxe edition bonus tracks ===
9. "Bitter Fruit (Cana No Mas Dub)" (UK 12" single - 1987) - 6:48
10. "Fruta Amarga" (Spanish 12" single - 1987) - 5:53
11. "No More Party's (For Those About to Party...)" (Rock mix) (12" single - 1987) - 5:38
12. "No More Party's (Funky Party Edit)" (R&B Mix) (12" single - 1987) - 4:18
13. "Vote Jesse In" (Jesse Jackson Campaign Song - 1988) - 4:45

=== 2019 "Bitter Fruit" digital bonus EP ===
1. "Bitter Fruit (Cana No Mas Dub)" (UK 12" single - 1987) - 6:48
2. "Bitter Fruit (No Pasaran Mix)" (UK 12" single - 1987) - 8:18
3. "Bitter Fruit (Platano Quemado Mix)" (UK 12" single - 1987) - 6:54
4. "No More Party's (For Those About to Party...)" (Rock mix) (12" single - 1987) - 5:38
5. "No More Party's (Funky Party Edit)" (R&B mix) (12" single - 1987) - 4:18

== Personnel ==
Credits are adapted from the album liner notes.

Musicians

- Little Steven – lead vocals, guitar, dulcimer, drum programming
- Bruce Springsteen – additional lead vocals on "Native American"
- Rubén Blades – additional lead vocals and percussion on "Bitter Fruit"
- Kenny Moore – additional vocals on "Trail of Broken Treaties", background vocals
- Cobra Jones (Note: 'Cobra Jones' is a pseudonym for Little Steven, one he first used on the 1984 track "Vote! Part III (After World War III)".) – additional vocals on "No More Party's"
- Steve Jordan, David Beal, Keith LeBlanc – drums
- Romeo Williams, Doug Wimbish, T.M. Stevens – bass guitar
- Charlie Judge – keyboards
- Greg Phillinganes, Tommy Mandel, Richard Scher, Paul Shaffer, Bernie Worrell – additional keyboards
- Monti Louis Ellison, David Beal – percussion
- Hilario P. Soto – toyo
- Zoë Yanakis – bass flute
- Benjamin Newberry, David Beal – drum programming
- Will Downing, Craig Derry, Wendell Morrison, Floyd Westerman, Tina B., Audrey Wheeler, Brenda White-King, Steve Jordan, Oren Waters, Julia Waters, Luther Waters, Maxine Waters, Debra Byrd, Elicia Wright, Benjamin Newberry - background vocals
- Sechaba Cultural Singers, Zola Dube, Tshepo Tsotetsi, Moeketsi Bodibe, Tnemba Ntinga, Mweli Mzizi, South African Students Committee of UCLA, Abner Mariri, Mendiswa Mzamne, Ronald Kunene, Kindiza Ngubeni, Nonhlanhla Simelane, Motlole Moseki - additional background vocals

Technical

- Little Steven – production, art direction
- Zoë Yanakis, Benjamin Newberry – production assistance
- Tom Lord-Alge – mixing
- Robert de la Garza, Steven Rinkoff, John Rollo, Thom Panunzio, Bruce Lampcov, Allan Meyerson, Don Smith, Clyde Kaplan, Tom Nist – engineering
- Rob Jacobs, Claude Achille, Jeff Lord-Alge, Don Rodenback, Ed Garcia, Bill Dooley, Rob Paustin, Shizuko Orishige – assistant engineering
- Bob Ludwig – mastering
- Dino Danelli – cover design, package concept design, handcoloring, art direction
- Manhattan Design – art assistance, assembly
- Caroline Greyshock – front cover photography, insert photography
- Guido Harari – back cover photography, insert photography
- Dumile Feni – South African art on insert
- Oren Lyons – "Iroquois Maid of the Mist" on insert
- Carlos Sanchez Arias – "The Crucifixion of Nicaragua" on insert

== Reception ==
Freedom - No Compromise retrospectively received three out of five stars from John Franck of AllMusic. He claims that "...in 1987, Little Steven would release Freedom No Compromise - the E Street-er's third solo record to date. Synth-laden textures, samples, and programming aside, Freedom No Compromise is an ambitious if somewhat over-produced effort. Although, certainly not as accomplished as Steven's sensational debut Men Without Women, the album features some fair to very good material. Overall, a good effort, but not a great one. For a better taste of the artist, spend some quality time with Men Without Women."

== Charts ==
=== Album ===
Chart (1987)	Position
The Billboard 200	80
Dutch Albums Chart	51
Swedish Albums Chart	3
Norwegian Albums Chart	11
German Albums Chart	48

=== Singles ===
Year	Single	Chart	Position
1987	"Trail of Broken Treaties"	Hot Mainstream Rock Tracks	29
1987	"Bitter Fruit"	Dutch Singles Chart	25
1987	"Bitter Fruit"	German Singles Chart	69
1987	"Bitter Fruit"	Italy Airplay (Music & Media)	1
1987	"Bitter Fruit"	Norwegian Singles Chart	25
1987	"Bitter Fruit"	Swedish Singles Chart	12
1987	"No More Party's"	Italy Airplay (Music & Media)	1
