= Summer of Sorcery Live! At the Beacon Theatre =

Live album by Little Steven
- Released: July 9, 2021
- Recorded: 2019
- Venue: Beacon Theatre
- Genre: R&B, Rock, Blues, Soul
- Label: Wicked Cool Records
- Producer: Steven Van Zandt

Little Steven chronology
Macca to Mecca! Live at the Cavern Club, Liverpool (2021)	Summer of Sorcery Live! At the Beacon Theatre (2021)

Summer of Sorcery Live! At the Beacon Theatre is the third live album and video released by Little Steven in 2021. The album was recorded live in concert on November 6, 2019, during the band's "Summer of Sorcery" world tour at the Beacon Theatre in New York City. The performance was issued in 3 CD, 5 LP, and Blu-ray formats.

== Track listing ==
1. "Intro: Wavy Gravy" - 0:30
2. "Communion" - 6:28
3. "Camouflage of Righteousness" - 7:00
4. "Party Mambo!" - 5:52
5. "Love Again" - 8:12
6. "Education" - 11:08
7. "On Sir Francis Drake" - 1:14
8. "I Visit the Blues" - 4:43
9. "Gravity" - 5:42
10. "Los Desaparecidos" - 5:42
11. "Little Girl So Fine" - 6:57
12. "Trapped Again" - 4:24
13. "Love on the Wrong Side of Town" - 4:23
14. "A World of Our Own" - 6:35
15. "Suddenly You" - 3:30
16. "Vortex" - 5:03
17. "I Am a Patriot" - 7:19
18. "Superfly Terraplane" - 4:42
19. "Bitter Fruit" - 10:11
20. "Forever" - 5:32
21. "Summer of Sorcery" - 10:11
22. "Tucson Train" - 4:40
23. "Freeze Frame" (featuring Peter Wolf) - 4:32
24. "Sun City" (featuring Peter Wolf) - 5:30
25. "Soul Power Twist" - 7:48
26. "Out of the Darkness" - 8:47

=== Bonus Tracks ===
1. "Bristol Stomp" - 2:31
2. "Club A-Go-Go" - 4:36
3. "Groovin' Is Easy" (featuring Nick Gravenites) - 5:04
4. "(Ain't Nothin' But a) Houseparty" (featuring Peter Wolf) - 5:00
5. "Ride the Night Away" (featuring Jimmy Barnes) - 5:56
6. "Moon Tears" (featuring Nils Lofgren) - 9:37
7. "Sun City" (featuring Jimmy Barnes, Peter Garrett, Sam Fender, Courtney Hadwin, Jake Clemons, Garland Jeffreys, & Bruce Springsteen, - 5:50
