= VOA (disambiguation) =

Voice of America is a U.S. government-funded multimedia agency.

VOA may also refer to:

== Government ==
- Valuation Office Agency, an agency of the UK's HM Revenue and Customs
- Military Intelligence Agency (Serbian: Vojnoobaveštajna agencija), Serbia's military intelligence agency

== Music ==
- Visions of Atlantis, a symphonic power metal band from Austria
- VOA (album), a 1984 album and song by Sammy Hagar
- Voice of Asia, an annual music festival
- "Voa, Voa" ("Fly, Fly"), a song by Zé Ramalho from his 1978 album Zé Ramalho

== Organisations ==
- Viaggio Air (ICAO: VOA), a Bulgarian airline
- Volunteers of America, a nonprofit human services organization
- Vasa Order of America, a Swedish-American fraternal society

== Other ==
- Variable Optical Attenuator, a device to reduce the intensity of light.
- Verb–object–agent, a theoretical variant of verb–object–subject; a language-classification type
- Vertex operator algebra, an algebraic structure used in conformal field theory
- Visa on Arrival, a type of travel visa
- The Voice of Action, a 1942 Canadian documentary
- Voice of Africa (disambiguation), multiple media outlets
