= America's Voice =

America's Voice may refer to:

- National Empowerment Television, later known as America's Voice, a now-defunct cable TV network
- America's Voice, a liberal immigration reform group founded by Frank Sharry

== See also ==
- Voice of America (disambiguation)
- Real America's Voice
