= Sun City (album) =

Studio album by Artists United Against Apartheid
- Released: October 25, 1985
- Recorded: Summer 1985
- Studios: Shakedown Sound, NYC; The Hit Factory, NYC; Electric Lady, NYC; M&I Recording, NYC; Unique, NYC; Right Track, NYC; Soundworks, NYC; Power Station, NYC; Fallout Shelter, London; The Outpost, Los Angeles; Windmill Lane, Dublin; Cherokee, Los Angeles; Syncro Sound, Boston; Eel Pie Studios, Middlesex; Startling Studios, Ascot
- Genres: Rock; pop; hip hop; jazz
- Length: 45:33
- Label: EMI Manhattan
- Producers: Little Steven; Arthur Baker

Singles from Sun City
- 1. "Sun City" Released: 16 October 1985; 2. "Let Me See Your I.D." Released: 1985; 3. "Silver and Gold (promo)" Released: 1985

Professional ratings
Review scores
Source	Rating
AllMusic	3/5 stars
Christgau's Record Guide	A−
Rolling Stone	Not rated link

Sun City is the only studio album by Artists United Against Apartheid, released on October 25, 1985, by EMI Manhattan Records. The Little Steven–led project features contributions from more than 50 artists from the rock, hip hop, soul, funk, jazz, reggae, Latin, and world music genres. The album contains two versions of the "Sun City" protest song against apartheid in South Africa as well as other selections in the same vein from that project.

== History ==
Initially intending to record the song "Sun City" for his third solo album Freedom – No Compromise, Little Steven (real name Steven Van Zandt) instead approached producer Arthur Baker to help record a "We Are the World"-inspired anti-apartheid protest single. In the song, Van Zandt urges artists to boycott the Sun City resort in South Africa, where artists such as Queen, Elton John, Linda Ronstadt and Rod Stewart have accepted invitations to perform. Van Zandt's mission was to raise awareness of the racial segregation enforced by the white government in South Africa, and to encourage the cultural boycott the United Nations had imposed in the early 1980s. "I had been doing research on American foreign policies," Van Zandt said, "and South Africa was on my list of engagements we were involved with, which I felt our government was on the wrong side of. By then, I had heard Peter Gabriel's "Biko," which was just a terrific inspiration."

With assistance from ABC News journalist Danny Schechter, Van Zandt and Baker assembled a wide variety of artists from Bruce Springsteen, Bob Dylan and Lou Reed to Gil Scott-Heron, Miles Davis and Africa Bambaataa. Rock critic Dave Marsh called it "the most diverse line up of popular musicians ever assembled for a single session." However, the recordings quickly became an album-length project of its own, and the Sun City album was recorded in summer 1985 at 15 different recording studios in New York, Los Angeles, Boston, Dublin and London.

In addition to the title track, other songs were recorded at the time to complete an album's worth of material. Drummer-musician Keith LeBlanc and Danny Schechter came up with "Revolutionary Situation", an audio-collage set to music that took its title from the words of South Africa's then-interior minister Louis Nel condemning the state of the country. Amid a background of yapping police dogs, sounds of mayhem and revolt in the township, LeBlanc and Schechter mixed in angry declarations by activists like Alan Boesak, Bishop Archbishop Desmond Tutu and Nelson Mandela's daughter Zindzi, looped with what was at that time the most recent interview with her father, recorded in 1961.

"No More Apartheid" is an improvisational piece featuring Peter Gabriel and Indian violinist L. Shankar. "Peter Gabriel came in and just started chanting. Weird African chant, out of nowhere ... Then he started harmonizing with himself," Van Zandt recalled. Drummer Keith LeBlanc then added drums to the chant, and Van Zandt put down guitar and synthesizer parts.

Inspired by meetings with other artists who volunteered, Bono of U2 went back to his hotel room and wrote "Silver and Gold" the same evening. The song was quickly recorded, with guitarists Keith Richards and Ron Wood of the Rolling Stones, and drummer Steve Jordan. Wood's guitar work is notable for using Keith's switchblade as a slide. "Silver and Gold" was also distributed separately as a promotional single. A last-minute inclusion, the song was left off the track listings of the original 1985 album and cassette pressings and considered to be a hidden track. Bono later explained, in an appearance on the US syndicated radio show "Rockline" with Bob Coburn, that he submitted the tape of the song after the album's artwork had been printed by EMI Manhattan Records. When Razor and Tie reissued the album in 1993, the song was included on the track listings. U2 also recorded two versions of the song: a live version in the Rattle and Hum film and album, and a studio version on the B-side of "Where the Streets Have No Name".

"The scariest encounter of the Sun City project had to be Miles Davis," recalled Van Zandt. "I wrote the intro for him to play… He's just not friendly. He makes Lou Reed look like a pussycat… He came in, sat down and I played him the "Silver and Gold" tape. He's sitting next to me, and he talks real low and slow, and right in my ear: "Hey man, do you want me to fucking play or what?" So he does his take, and I asked him to redo it with the mute on. I went and reassembled his old quintet with Herbie Hancock, Ron Carter on bass and Tony Williams on drums."

"Let Me See Your I.D." – based on a line from Gil Scott-Heron's "Johannesburg" – features vocal contributions from Scott-Heron and various rappers and singers. All were told to feel free to express their feelings about the subject any way they wanted lyrically. Then audio from news footage, excerpts from Nelson Mandela's speeches, and sound effects were added, and turned into an anti-apartheid montage.

== Critical reception ==
Music critic Robert Christgau felt that each side of the album closes with "a well-meaning failure", writing that "Revolutionary Situation"'s "collage of indistinct South African voices over Keith LeBlanc humdrum is an object lesson in political correctness that might have made a collectible B, and Bono's country blues is simply ignorant." He added that Gil Scott-Heron's "superrap" on "Let Me See Your I.D." "is as astute and moving rhythmically as it is ideologically," and that "No More Apartheid" is a "worthy successor" to Peter Gabriel's "Biko." Christgau also highlighted the two versions of the title track, which he felt "can grow on you in a big way."

AllMusic's Stephen Thomas Erlewine wrote retrospectively that the album is "extremely listenable," saying, "it's one of the few charity or protest albums that stands up to repeated listenings, thanks to the extended instrumental workouts." Unlike Robert Christgau, Erlewine felt that "Silver and Gold" was "the finest moment" on the album. Trouser Press called the album "a powerful record given weight by the cause and the challenge."

== Release ==
Sun City was a modest success, reaching #31 on the Billboard 200 pop albums chart. It did much better in terms of critical reaction, placing at #5 on the Pazz & Jop Critics Poll for albums for that year. Sun City got the final spot on Rolling Stone's list of the best 100 albums of the 1980s in 1989 and 2016.

The album was issued on CD by Razor & Tie in 1993 – but, after the end of apartheid in 1994, eventually went out of print.

In 2019, the album was remastered for release as part of Van Zandt's career-spanning box set Rock N Roll Rebel: The Early Work. The digital deluxe edition of the album was released on December 6, 2019, containing four bonus tracks. The digital deluxe edition also includes the reissued Let Me See Your I.D. bonus EP.

== Track listing ==
Adapted from the 2019 reissue liner notes.

Side one
No.	Title	Writer(s)	Featuring	Length
1.	"Sun City"	Steven Van Zandt		7:12
2.	"No More Apartheid"	Artists United Against Apartheid	Peter Gabriel, L. Shankar	7:10
3.	"Revolutionary Situation"	Artists United Against Apartheid	Compiled and edited by Keith LeBlanc and The News Dissector	6:06

Side two
No.	Title	Writer(s)	Featuring	Length
4.	"Sun City (Version II)"	Van Zandt		5:44
5.	"Let Me See Your I.D."	Artists United Against Apartheid	Gil Scott-Heron, Miles Davis, Grandmaster Melle Mel, Peter Wolf, Sonny Okosuns, Malopoets, Duke Bootee, Ray Baretto, Peter Garrett	7:30
6.	"The Struggle Continues"	Artists United Against Apartheid	Miles Davis, Stanley Jordan, Herbie Hancock, Sonny Okosuns, Ron Carter, Tony Williams, Richard Scher	7:05
7.	"Silver and Gold"	Bono	Bono, Keith Richards, Ron Wood, Steve Jordan	4:42

== Personnel ==
Adapted from the 2019 reissue liner notes, except where noted.

Musicians

- Afrika Bambaataa, Stiv Bators, Pat Benatar, Big Youth, Rubén Blades, Kurtis Blow, Bono, Duke Bootee, Jackson Browne, Jimmy Cliff, George Clinton, Will Downing, Bob Dylan, the Fat Boys, Peter Gabriel, Peter Garrett, Bob Geldof, Daryl Hall, Nona Hendryx, Linton Kwesi Johnson, Kashif, Eddie Kendricks, Darlene Love, Malopoets, Grandmaster Melle Mel, Michael Monroe, John Oates, Bonnie Raitt, Joey Ramone, Lou Reed, David Ruffin, Run-DMC, Scorpio, Gil Scott-Heron, Bruce Springsteen, Via Afrika, Peter Wolf, Bobby Womack – vocals
- Ringo Starr – drums
- Zak Starkey – drums
- Keith LeBlanc – drums, drum programming
- Tony Williams – drums
- Steve Jordan – drums
- Little Steven – guitar, keyboards, drum programming
- Pete Townshend – guitar
- Stanley Jordan – guitar
- Keith Richards – guitar
- Ron Wood – guitar
- Doug Wimbish – bass
- Ron Carter – acoustic bass
- Herbie Hancock – keyboards
- Richard Scher – keyboards
- Robby Kilgore – keyboards
- Zoë Yanakis – additional keyboards
- Miles Davis – trumpet
- Clarence Clemons – saxophone
- L. Shankar – double violin
- Ray Barretto – conga, vocals
- Sonny Okosuns – talking drum, vocals
- Jam Master Jay – scratching
- DJ Cheese – scratching
- Benjamin Newman – drum programming
- B.J. Nelson – background vocals
- Lotti Golden – background vocals
- Tina B. – background vocals
- Daryl Hannah – additional background vocals
- Kevin McCormick – additional background vocals
- The Dunnes Stores Strikers – additional background vocals
- Annie Brody Dutka – additional background vocals
- Robert Gordon – additional background vocals
- Steve Walker – additional background vocals

Technical

- Little Steven – producer
- Arthur Baker – producer, mixing (bonus EP: tracks 1–3), remixing (tracks 10, 11)
- Zoë Yanakis – production assistance
- Keith LeBlanc – additional production assistance (track 3), editing (bonus EP: tracks 1–3)
- Robbie Kilgore – additional production assistance (track 2)
- Chris Lord-Alge – engineer, mixing, additional production assistance (track 2)
- Tom Lord-Alge – engineer, mixing, additional production assistance (track 2)
- John Davenport – engineer, mixing
- Peter Darmi – engineer, mixing
- Rob Paustin – engineer
- Jeff Hendrickson – engineer
- Andy Wallace – engineer
- James Geddes – engineer
- Steve Kahn – engineer
- George Tutko – engineer
- Bobby Cohen – engineer
- Pat McCarthy – engineer
- Michael Smith – engineer
- Mike O'Donnell – engineer
- Bill Price – engineer
- Gary Wright – engineer
- Steve Peck – engineer
- Roey Shamir – engineer
- Jamie Chaleff, Lenny Bernstein, Mark Russack, David Sussman, Steve Boyer, Ken Steiger, Scott Church, Rob Rushing, Bridget Daly, Chris Lunwinski, Mike Nicoletti, Ken Collins, Steve Antebi, Kevin Maloney, Tony Viamontes, Stephen Scharrott, Barbara Milne, Alan Friedman – assistant engineer
- Frank Filipetti – mixing
- Jay Burnett – mixing
- Aldo Marin – mixing (bonus EP: tracks 1–3), editing (tracks 10, 11, bonus EP: tracks 1–3)
- Albert Cabrera – editing (bonus EP: tracks 1–3)
- Bob Ludwig – mastering
- Herb Powers – original mastering (bonus EP: tracks 1–3)
- Tony Wright – cover art design
- Rosemary Intrieri/Koppel & Scher – art direction

== Charts ==
Chart (1985–1986)	Peak Position
Austrian Albums	25
Dutch Albums	23
German Albums	34
New Zealand Albums	34
Norwegian Albums	16
Swedish Albums	13
Swiss Albums	17
US Billboard 200	31
