= Voice of Africa =

The Voice of Africa may be:

- Voice of Africa Radio, an FM station in London
- Voice of Africa, A24 news channel, broadcasting from Kenya
- Voice of Africa (shortwave), the official Arabic broadcast of the government of Libya, formerly known as Radio Jamahiriya, closed 2011
- The Voice of Africa, book by Leo Frobenius
- The Voice of Africa (Miriam Makeba album), 1964
- The Voice of Africa (Kelly Khumalo album), 2020
