= Standing in the Line of Fire =

Studio album by Gary U.S. Bonds
- Released: September 1984
- Recorded: Kingdom Sound; Syosset, Long Island; Don Casale Studios; Westbury, Long Island
- Genre: Rock, Pop, R&B
- Length: 35:48
- Label: Phoenix Records
- Producer: Steven Van Zandt; Gary U.S. Bonds

Gary U.S. Bonds chronology
On the Line (1982)	Standing in the Line of Fire (1984)	Nothing Left to Lose (1996)

Professional ratings
Review scores
Source	Rating
AllMusic	2.0/5 stars
The Encyclopedia of Popular Music	2/5 stars

Standing in the Line of Fire is an album by Gary U.S. Bonds, released in 1984. It is credited to Gary U.S. Bonds and the American Men. The album was a followup to his two Springsteen/Van Zandt-produced albums Dedication and On the Line, though the only carry-over from the previous two albums was Steven Van Zandt, who wrote, sang backing vocals for, and played lead guitar on the title track.

The album contains a cover of Ritchie Valens's "Come On Let's Go." The title track was released as a single paired with "Wild Nights," but received little attention. The album remains unissued on CD.

== Track listing ==
- All songs written by Gary U.S. Bonds unless otherwise noted.
1. "Standing In the Line of Fire" (Steven Van Zandt) – 3:39
2. "Sneakin' Away" – 3:19
3. "I Wish I Could Dance Like Fred Astaire" – 3:15
4. "Working Man" – 4:08
5. "Wild Nights" – 3:52
6. "Dance" – 3:41
7. "Take a Chance" – 3:39
8. "City Lights" – 3:31
9. "Come On Let's Go" (Ritchie Valens) – 2:27
10. "You Are the One" – 5:03

== Personnel ==
Musicians:

- Gary U.S. Bonds – lead vocals
- Steven Van Zandt – guitar (lead "Standing In the Line of Fire"), background vocals ("Standing In the Line of Fire")
- The American Men:
  - Joe Martin – guitar, background vocals
  - Lucille Almond – guitar, background vocals
  - Rudy Richman – drums, background vocals
  - Steve Rossi – keyboards, background vocals
  - Joey Stann – saxophone, horns, background vocals
  - Larry Russell – bass, background vocals
- U.S. Horns:
  - Nelson Bogart
  - Mark Pender
  - Ed Manion
  - Bob Funk
  - Joey Stann
- Additional musicians:
  - Phil 'Teddy Bear' Grande – guitar
  - Gregg Meade – guitar, background vocals
  - Bob Cadway – guitar
  - Dean Bailin – guitar
  - Mike Macara – drums
  - Nicky Bear – keyboards
  - Frankie Vinci – keyboards, background vocals
  - Gene Kraus – keyboards
  - Alan Palanka – keyboards
  - George Ruiz – bass, background vocals
  - Gary Watkins – bass
  - Donna Cristy – background vocals
  - Donna Bach – background vocals
  - Avita Belmonte – background vocals

Production:

- Gary U.S. Bonds – producer, mixing
- Steven Van Zandt – producer (track 1), mixing
- Billy Civitella – producer (tracks 2–5), mixing
- John Apostol – executive producer
- John Devlin – mixing
- Tom Coyne – mastering
- Dino Danelli – art direction, design
- Jim Marchesi – photography
