= Born Again Savage =

Studio album by Little Steven
- Released: September 10, 1999 (Renegade Nation website); November 30, 1999 (stores)
- Recorded: 1994
- Studios: Avatar, New York City
- Genres: Rock, Hard rock
- Length: 1:01:01
- Labels: Renegade Nation; Pachyderm Records (limited promo)
- Producer: Little Steven

Little Steven chronology
| Revolution (1989) | Born Again Savage (1999) | Soulfire (2017) |

Singles from Born Again Savage
- 1. "Camouflage of Righteousness" Released: 1999; 2. "Salvation" Released: 1999

Professional ratings
Review scores
| Source | Rating |
|---|---|
| AllMusic | 3/5 stars |
| Entertainment Weekly | B− |

Born Again Savage is the fifth solo studio album by American musician Little Steven (stage name of Steven Van Zandt), released in September 1999 by Renegade Nation. It was his first album since 1989's Revolution.

Born Again Savage was a return to the raw, garage rock sound of his second album, Voice of America from 1984. The main topic of the album is religion. The rhythm section on all songs is bassist Adam Clayton (of U2) and drummer Jason Bonham. Jean Beauvoir, who was one of the original Disciples of Soul, sang background vocals on the album. After its release, Van Zandt returned to play with Bruce Springsteen and the E Street Band for 18 years until reforming the Disciples of Soul for the 2017 album Soulfire.

== Background ==
The songs on Born Again Savage were originally written by Van Zandt in 1989-1990 and were eventually recorded in 1994. After initially being rejected by his then current label, the album was finally released in November 1999 when Van Zandt started his own record label, Renegade Nation. To promote the album, there was a promotional single edit of "Camouflage of Righteousness" released through mp3.com, edited to 4:36; down from the album version's 5:01. Not as many copies of the album were sold as expected.

The album's main theme is the lack of religion and spiritual ideas in daily life. However, "Flesheater" deals with animal rights and vegetarianism, and "Guns, Drugs and Gasoline" touches upon the use of fossil fuel. "Politics, religion and sex interrelate throughout the album," Van Zandt said.

In 2019, the album was remastered for release as part of Van Zandt's career-spanning box set Rock N Roll Rebel: The Early Work. The digital deluxe edition of the album was released on November 22, 2019 containing one bonus track, a 2019 solo acoustic rendition of Van Zandt's song "It's Been a Long Time" originally recorded by Southside Johnny and the Asbury Jukes and released on their 1991 album Better Days.

== Liner notes ==
Little Steven wrote in the liner notes of the album:

This is the record I would have made in 1969 had I been capable.

It took 20 more years to write it and another 10 to get it out but chronological time is overrated anyway ain`t it? It is a tribute to the hard rock pioneers that kept me alive growing up. The Kinks, the Who, the Yardbirds and the three groups the Yardbirds spawned -- Cream, the Jeff Beck Group and Led Zeppelin. It is additionally a statement of profound gratitude to George Harrison, the Beatles, the Rolling Stones, and the Jefferson Airplane who first turned me on to Eastern melody and philosophy and forever expanded my cross-cultural consciousness. I must also thank Bob Dylan from whom all lyrics flow, and Allen Ginsberg for being a Buddhist among other things. This is the fifth and last of the political albums I outlined when I decided to make my own records. I wanted to learn about what was going on and write about it, talk about it, and hopefully learn something about myself in the process. After 5 albums and 7 years of traveling and studying and looking around I wrote the following liner notes intended for the original release of this record. We live in an insane asylum. A barbaric, merciless cesspool. And in this purgatory filled with disease and ugliness and violence and hatred and injustice and greed and lies and pain and frustration and confusion there are brief, fleeting moments of peace and love and truth and beauty. They are rare. They are years and miles apart. But they are so meaningful that they make life worth living. Those moments give you strength to face the insanity with your balance intact and your eyes focused and you endure and tolerate and survive. And if you`re lucky, real lucky, you can tap that strength and hold on to it long enough to, in your own small way, try to make it all a little bit better. Just a little bit more civil and just. To serve. And you don`t do it for anybody else because no one is going to thank you or reward you or even notice. Don`t kid yourself. You do it for you. For your own soul. Because in this world that`s all the salvation you`re ever gonna get

-Little Steven 1999

== Track listing ==
All tracks are written by Little Steven.

1. "Born Again Savage" - 4:38
2. "Camouflage of Righteousness" - 5:01
3. "Guns, Drugs, and Gasoline" - 4:59
4. "Face of God" - 7:38
5. "Saint Francis" - 8:17
6. "Salvation" - 5:09
7. "Organize" - 2:13
8. "Flesheater" - 6:07
9. "Lust for Enlightenment" - 8:38
10. "Tongues of Angels" - 8:19

2019 digital deluxe edition bonus track

11. "It's Been a Long Time" (solo acoustic, 2019 - previously unreleased) - 4:16
- "Camouflage of Righteousness" appears in The Sopranos episode "Whitecaps" and "Salvation" appears in the episode "Moe n' Joe".
- Tracks used in the series Lilyhammer co-produced and featuring Steven Van Zandt: "Guns, Drugs and Gasoline" (S3E3), "Flesheater" (S3E7)

== Personnel ==
Musicians

- Little Steven – vocals, guitars, arranger
- Adam Clayton – bass
- Jason Bonham – drums
- Steve Jordan – background vocals
- Jean Beauvoir – background vocals
- Ben Newberry – background vocals
- Frank Newberry – background vocals
- "Dizzy" Daniel Moorehead – saxophone

Technical

- Little Steven – producer
- Ben Fowler – engineer
- Zoe Thrall – engineer
- Scott Austin – assistant engineer
- Kevin Shirley – mixing
- Rich Alvy – mixing assistant
- Dan Gellert – additional engineer
- Andrea Yankovsky – additional assistant engineer
- George Marino – mastering (at Sterling Sound)
- Alex Ewen – art design
- Lorraine Cullin – art design assistant
- Gustave Doré – original wood engravings
- Ronnie Farley – photography

== Chart ==
| Single | Chart (2000) | Position |
|---|---|---|
| "Salvation" | Mainstream Rock | 40 |

- The Born Again Savage album itself did not chart.
