= Malopoets =

Malopoets were a musical group formed in the Republic of South Africa by Patrick Sefolosha and Kenny Mathaba in 1978 in Johannesburg. The group has produced three studio albums: Fire (1982), Malopoets (1985) and Life is for Living (1988).

== History ==
The Malopoets group was formed on July 17, 1978, the 11th anniversary of the death of John Coltrane. Patrick Sefolosha, the Malopoets' leader in the 1980s, described Coltrane as "the godfather of the group".

For a while during the 1980s the group was based in Switzerland. In mid-1980s the group included Patrick Sefolosha, Bruce Sosibo, Sam Shabalala, Pat Mokoka, Moss Manaka and Mervyn Africa. Malopoets released their second album, Malopoets, in 1985; the album was recorded in Paris. In 1985 they also released a single Sound of the People (through EMI).

The band broke up in early 1986.

== Sources ==
- Gwen Ansell (2005). Soweto Blues: Jazz, Popular Music, and Politics in South Africa. A&C Black. ISBN 9780826417534.
- Max Mojapelo (2008). Beyond Memory: Recording the History, Moments and Memories of South African Music. African Minds. ISBN 9781920299286.
- Colin Larkin, ed. (2006). Volume 5 of The Encyclopedia of Popular Music. MUZE. ISBN 9780195313734.
