= The Early Work =

Compilation album by Little Steven
- Released: November 1, 2019
- Recorded: 1973–1995
- Genre: R&B, Rock, Blues, Soul
- Label: Wicked Cool Records
- Producer: Steven Van Zandt

Little Steven chronology
Summer of Sorcery (2019)	The Early Work (2019)	Rock N Roll Rebel: The Early Work (2019)

The Early Work is a compilation album released by Little Steven in conjunction with his Rock N Roll Rebel: The Early Work box set in 2019. The album contains various live recordings featuring Steve Van Zandt recorded between 1973 and 1995. The early versions of "Love on the Wrong Side of Town" and "Little Girl So Fine" feature alternate lyrics than those heard on Southside Johnny and the Asbury Jukes original 1977 album This Time It's for Real.

== Track listing ==
1. "Who Told You?" (Live at Gulliver's Pub, Red Bank, New Jersey - June 15, 1973) - 3:12
2. "That's How It Feels" (Live at Stone Pony, Asbury Park, NJ - May 30, 1976) - 5:37
3. "When You Dance" (Rehearsal - 1976) - 3:39
4. "Little Darlin'" (Stone Pony rehearsal - 1977) - 5:12
5. "Ain't No Lady" (Stone Pony rehearsal - 1977) - 5:12
6. "Love on the Wrong Side of Town" (Stone Pony rehearsal - 1977) - 4:29
7. "Little Girl So Fine" (Rehearsal - 1976) - 3:12
8. "Some Things Just Don't Change" (Stone Pony rehearsal - 1977) - 3:49
9. "She Got Me Where She Wants Me" (Stone Pony rehearsal - 1977) - 4:16
10. "I Wish It Would Rain" (Vin Scelsa Hungerthon - 1995) - 3:15
- Track 1 recorded by Southside Johnny and the Kid
- Tracks 2–9 recorded by Southside Johnny and the Asbury Jukes
- Track 10 recorded by Little Steven, Southside Johnny, Rusty Cloud, Bobby Bandiera and David Hayes
