= Men Without Women (album) =

Studio album by Little Steven and the Disciples of Soul
- Released: October 1982
- Recorded: November 1981
- Studio: Power Station, New York City; Clover Studios, Los Angeles; The Hit Factory, New York City
- Genre: R&B, Rock
- Length: 42:32
- Label: EMI America
- Producer: Steven Van Zandt

Little Steven and the Disciples of Soul chronology
Men Without Women (1982)	Voice of America (1984)

Singles from Men Without Women
- 1. "Forever" / "Caravan" Released: October 1982; 2. "I've Been Waiting" Released: 1982; 3. "Under the Gun" Released: 1982; 4. "Save Me" Released: 1982; 5. "Lyin' in a Bed of Fire" Released: April 1983

Men Without Women is the debut solo studio album by American musician Steven Van Zandt, credited as Little Steven and the Disciples of Soul. It was released in October 1982 by EMI America. The title track was inspired by Ernest Hemingway's collection of short stories of the same name.

== Background ==
In 1980, Van Zandt produced Dedication, a comeback album for singer Gary U.S. Bonds. Gary Gersh, who was in charge of the Bonds album at EMI America Records, subsequently approached Van Zandt and indicated that the label would be interested in a Van Zandt solo project. In November 1981, Van Zandt began recording the album at The Power Station, using musicians from the E Street Band, the Asbury Jukes and the Miami Horns. Among the songs recorded at these sessions were "Inside of Me," "Princess of Little Italy" and "I've Been Waiting," the last of these originally written by Van Zandt for the Jukes album Hearts of Stone. Bruce Springsteen also took part in these sessions, providing backing vocals on "Angel Eyes," "Until The Good Is Gone" and "Men Without Women." Springsteen's contributions went uncredited but have been confirmed in interview by Van Zandt.

Before finishing Men Without Women, Van Zandt produced a second Bonds album, On the Line, and also began recording Born in the U.S.A. with Springsteen. By the summer of 1982, Van Zandt had recruited his own band, the Disciples of Soul, featuring drummer Dino Danelli and bassist Jean Beauvoir, and it was this line up that completed the album, recording "Under the Gun" and "Lyin' in a Bed of Fire." Van Zandt had also decided to adopt the pseudonym Little Steven, partly to distance himself from any Springsteen comparisons and partly as a tribute to Little Richard and Little Walter. On July 18, 1982, Little Steven and the Disciples of Soul made their live debut at the Peppermint Lounge in New York City. The concert was filmed for video release and as a companion to the album. On May 13 the film version of Men Without Women was given a European premiere at the Cannes Film Festival.

== Release ==
Men Without Women was released in October 1982. A feature-length film built around a live performance was also released alongside the album. "Forever" was the first single from the album. "Lyin' in a Bed of Fire" was also released as a single.

Professional ratings
Review scores
Source	Rating
AllMusic	4.5/5 stars
Billboard	(unrated)
Cash Box	(unrated)
Robert Christgau	B−

As a single, "Forever" spent nine weeks on the Billboard Hot 100, peaking at #63. The album did little better, reaching only #118 on the Billboard 200. The music videos for "Forever" and "Under The Gun" were played in heavy rotation on early MTV. "Inside of Me" was later featured on The Sopranos in which Van Zandt himself also starred.

On July 2, 2011, the album was performed in its entirety by Southside Johnny and the Asbury Jukes at the Stone Pony in Asbury Park, New Jersey. Richie La Bamba, Mark Pender, Ed Manion and Stan Harrison from the original Disciples of Soul were part of the horn section.

In 2019, the album was remastered for release as part of Van Zandt's career-spanning box set Rock N Roll Rebel: The Early Work. The digital deluxe edition of the album was released on October 18, 2019, containing 10 bonus tracks, including the previously unknown studio outtake "Time".

== Track listing ==
All songs written by Steven Van Zandt, except where noted.

1. "Lyin' in a Bed of Fire" – 4:23
2. "Inside of Me" – 5:03
3. "Until the Good Is Gone" – 4:01
4. "Men Without Women" – 2:49
5. "Under the Gun" – 3:59
6. "Save Me" – 4:52
7. "Princess of Little Italy" – 5:14
8. "Angel Eyes" – 4:32
9. "Forever" – 3:56
10. "I've Been Waiting" – 3:54

=== 2019 digital deluxe edition bonus tracks ===
11. "Men Without Women radio spot" (1982) - 1:15
12. "Angel Eyes" (Britt Row version, 1982 – previously unreleased) - 4:29
13. "Forever" (Britt Row version, 1982 – previously unreleased) - 3:39
14. "Until the Good Is Gone" (Britt Row version, 1982 – previously unreleased) - 4:52
15. "I've Been Waiting" (early version, 1982 – previously unreleased) (with Southside Johnny) - 3:57
16. "Caravan" (Juan Tizol, Duke Ellington) (live, 7" single, 1982) - 3:57
17. "Save Me" (live at Peppermint Lounge, New York, NY, July 18, 1982 – previously unreleased) - 5:06
18. "Time" (studio track, 1982 – previously unreleased) - 5:01
19. "Princess of Little Italy" (Vin Scelsa Hungerthon, 1995 – previously unreleased) - 6:04
20. "This Time It's for Real" (live at Marquee Club, London, UK, October 18, 1982/Live at Peppermint Lounge, New York, NY, July 18, 1982 – previously unreleased) - 5:26

== Personnel ==
=== Musicians ===
- Steven Van Zandt – lead vocals, guitar
- The Disciples of Soul
  - Jean Beauvoir – bass, backing vocals
  - Dino Danelli – drums on "Under the Gun" and "Lyin' in a Bed of Fire"
  - Monti Louis Ellison – percussion, berimbau, djembe
  - Zoë Yanakis – oboe solo on "Under the Gun"
- The E Street Band
  - Clarence Clemons – backing vocals
  - Danny Federici – organ, accordion
  - Garry Tallent – bass
  - Bruce Springsteen – backing vocals on "Angel Eyes", "Until the Good Is Gone" and "Men Without Women"
  - Max Weinberg – drums
- La Bamba's Mambomen
  - Mark Pender – trumpet
  - Mike Spengler – trumpet
  - Stan Harrison – tenor sax, flute
  - Richie "La Bamba" Rosenberg – trombone, backing vocals
  - Eddie Manion – baritone sax, solo on "Forever"
- Additional musicians
  - Manolo Badrena – percussion
  - Gary U.S. Bonds – backing vocals
  - John "J.T." Bowen – backing vocals
  - Felix Cavaliere – piano, organ
  - Rusty Cloud – organ
  - Sammy Figueroa – percussion
  - Kevin Kavanaugh – piano
  - Benjamin Newberry – chimes
  - Bob Werner – tambourine

=== Technical ===
- Steven Van Zandt – producer, arranger
- Bob Clearmountain – engineer, mixing on "Forever"
- Toby Scott – engineer on "Under the Gun", "Lyin' in a Bed of Fire" and "I've Been Waiting", mixing engineer
- Garry Rindfuss – additional engineer
- Zoë Yanakis – assistant engineer
- Josh Abbey – assistant engineer
- Malcolm Pollack – assistant engineer
- Dana Bisbee – assistant engineer
- Bobby Cohen – assistant engineer
- Wally Traugott – mastering (at Capitol Records, Los Angeles)
- Bill Burks – art direction
- Henry Marquez – art direction
- Dino Danelli – art direction assistance
- Mike Diehl – art direction assistance
- Jim Marchese – photography

== Charts ==
=== Album ===
Chart (1982)	Peak position
U.S. Billboard Top LPs & Tape	118
Swedish Albums Chart	26

=== Singles ===
Single	Chart (1982)	Position
"Forever"	U.S. Billboard Hot 100	63
"Forever"	US Top Rock Tracks	39
"Forever"	Norwegian Singles Chart	23
"Forever"	Dutch Singles Chart	23
"Lyin' in a Bed of Fire"	US Top Rock Tracks	30
