= Revolution (Little Steven album) =

Studio album by Little Steven
- Released: January 31, 1989
- Recorded: February–May 1988
- Studio: The Hit Factory, New York City
- Genre: Rock, pop, dance-rock
- Length: 50:15
- Label: RCA
- Producer: Little Steven

Little Steven chronology
Freedom – No Compromise (1987)	Revolution (1989)	Born Again Savage (1999)

Singles from Revolution
- 1. "Revolution" Released: 1989; 2. "Love and Forgiveness" Released: 1989; 3. "Leonard Peltier" Released: 1989

Professional ratings
Review scores
Source	Rating
AllMusic	3/5 stars
Star Pulse	2.5/5 stars

Revolution is the fourth solo studio album by Little Steven, released in 1989 by RCA Records. His backing band, the Disciples of Soul, were gone in all but name (although former Disciple/Young Rascals drummer Dino Danelli did the album art), and the music was largely electronic with a rock-soul-funk sound.

In 2019, the album was remastered for release as part of Van Zandt's career-spanning box set Rock N Roll Rebel: The Early Work. The digital deluxe edition of the album was released on November 15, 2019, containing two bonus tracks.

== Track listing ==
All songs written and arranged by Little Steven.

1. "Where Do We Go From Here?" - 5:53
2. "Revolution" - 5:25
3. "Education" - 4:39
4. "Balance" - 5:16
5. "Love and Forgiveness" - 4:48
6. "Newspeak" - 5:21
7. "Sexy" - 4:03
8. "Leonard Peltier" - 3:45
9. "Liberation Theology" - 4:49
10. "Discipline" - 6:16

=== 2019 digital deluxe edition bonus tracks ===
11. "Revolution (Naked City Mix)" (UK 12" single - 1989) - 9:46
12. "Revolution (Naked City Mix Part 2 - Maceo's Thang)" (UK 12" single - 1989) - 5:44

== Personnel ==
Credits are adapted from the album liner notes.

- Little Steven – vocals, guitar, drum programming
- Mark Alexander – MIDI programming, keyboards, background vocals
- Leslie Ming – drums, percussion, background vocals
- Warren McRae – bass, background vocals
- Craig Derry – background vocals
- Will Downing – background vocals
- Danny Madden – background vocals
- Mark Ladford – background vocals
- David Beal – percussion on "Where Do We Go From Here?"

Technical

- Little Steven – producer
- Mark Alexander – production assistance
- Warren McRae – production assistance
- David McNair – engineer, mixing
- Tom Lord-Alge – mixing on "Balance" and "Love and Forgiveness"
- Joe Perrera – assistant mixing engineer
- Bob Ludwig – mastering
- Dino Danelli – art director, designer, artist
- Veronica Sim – photography

== Charts ==
=== Album ===
Chart (1989)	Peak position
Swedish Albums Chart	32

=== Singles ===
Year	Single	Chart	Position
1989	"Revolution"	Dutch Singles Chart	73

- "Love and Forgiveness" and "Leonard Peltier" were also released as singles, however, they did not chart.
