= I Don't Want to Go Home =

Studio album by Southside Johnny and the Asbury Jukes
- Released: June 7, 1976
- Recorded: January – March 1976
- Studios: The Record Plant, New York City
- Genres: R&B, rock, soul
- Length: 35:00
- Label: Epic
- Producer: Steven Van Zandt

Southside Johnny and the Asbury Jukes chronology
I Don't Want to Go Home (1976)	This Time It's for Real (1977)

Singles from I Don't Want to Go Home
- 1. "I Don't Want to Go Home/The Fever" Released: June 1976 (US) / July 23, 1976 (UK); 2. "Got to Get You Off My Mind/It Ain't the Meat (It's the Motion)" Released: 1976 (Germany)

Professional ratings
Review scores
Source	Rating
AllMusic	4/5 stars
Christgau's Record Guide	B

I Don't Want to Go Home was the first album by New Jersey rock/R&B band Southside Johnny and the Asbury Jukes. The work helped establish the basis of the Jersey Shore sound. It was produced and arranged by manager Steven Van Zandt, who also sang, played guitar, wrote the title song, and elicited the contribution of two compositions by Bruce Springsteen, who also wrote the liner notes.

The album features two perennial standards for the band, Steve Van Zandt's "I Don't Want to Go Home" and "The Fever" by Bruce Springsteen. There were a number of guest artists and duets, a tradition that continued in their next album, This Time It's for Real. The track "How Come You Treat Me So Bad" features a duet with Lee Dorsey, while "Broke Down Piece of Man" features a duet with Steven Van Zandt, "It Ain't the Meat (It's the Motion)" features a duet with Kenny 'Popeye' Pentifallo, and finally "You Mean So Much To Me" features a duet with Ronnie Spector.

== Track listing ==
1. "I Don't Want to Go Home" (Steven Van Zandt) - 3:42
2. "Got to Get You Off My Mind" (Solomon Burke, J.B. Moore) - 3:13
3. "How Come You Treat Me So Bad" (Steven Van Zandt) - 3:23
4. "The Fever" (Bruce Springsteen) - 5:06
5. "Broke Down Piece of Man" (Steve Cropper, Joe Shamwell) - 3:28
6. "Sweeter Than Honey" (Steven Van Zandt) - 3:33
7. "Fanny Mae" (Waymon Glasco, Morris Levy, Clarence L. Lewis) - 3:22
8. "It Ain't the Meat (It's the Motion)" (Henry Glover) - 2:46
9. "I Choose to Sing the Blues" (Ray Charles, Billie Holiday) - 2:45
10. "You Mean So Much to Me" (Bruce Springsteen) - 3:44

== Personnel ==
Musicians

- Southside Johnny – lead vocals, harmonica
- Kenny 'Popeye' Pentifallo – drums, vocals (duet "It Ain't the Meat")
- Kevin Kavanaugh – keyboards, vocals
- Billy Rush – guitar
- Alan Berger – bass
- Carlo Novi - tenor saxophone
- Steven Van Zandt – guitar, vocals (duet "Broke Down Piece of Man")
- Clarence Clemons (credited as Selmon T. Sachs) - bass vocals ("The Fever")
- Lee Dorsey - duet vocals ("How Come You Treat Me So Bad")
- Ronnie Spector - duet vocals ("You Mean So Much To Me")
- The Miami Horns:
  - Rick Gazda – trumpet (mute solo "It Ain't the Meat")
  - Deacon Earl Gardner - trumpet, witness
  - Bob Malach - tenor saxophone
  - Louie 'The Lover' Parenti – trombone
  - Bill Zacagni - baritone saxophone
- Strings:
  - Charles Parker - violin
  - Robert Zelnick - violin
  - Naomi Anner - violin
  - Cathy Tait - violin
  - Nardo Poy - viola
  - Ken Dreyfus - viola
- Revelation (background vocals on "The Fever"):
  - Arnold McCuller
  - Arthur Freeman
  - Phillip Ballou
  - Benny Diggs

Production

- Steven Van Zandt - producer
- Jimmy Iovine - engineer
- Dave Thoener - assistant engineer
- Mitchel Funk - photography
- Paula Scher - designer
- Bud Copeland - stylist
