= Voice of America (Little Steven album) =

Studio album by Little Steven
- Released: May 7, 1984
- Recorded: 1983–1984
- Studio: The Hit Factory, New York City; Polar Studios, Stockholm; ICP Recording Studios, Brussels
- Genre: Rock
- Length: 40:51
- Label: EMI America
- Producer: Little Steven

Little Steven chronology
Men Without Women (1982)	Voice of America (1984)	Freedom – No Compromise (1987)

Singles from Voice of America
- 1. "Solidarity" Released: August 1983; 2. "Out of the Darkness" Released: May 1984; 3. "Undefeated (Everybody Goes Home)" Released: August 1984

Professional ratings
Review scores
Source	Rating
AllMusic	4/5 stars
Robert Christgau	C+

Voice of America is the second solo studio album by Little Steven & the Disciples of Soul released on May 7, 1984, four weeks before Bruce Springsteen released Born in the U.S.A.

This album traded in the horns and the R&B influences of the previous Men Without Women for a raw, garage rock sound. Politics came to the lyrical forefront, with the general theme being opposition to the Reagan Era's American foreign policy.

"Out of the Darkness", a synthesizer-led anthem with sweeping arena rock and hair metal atmosphere, garnered some airplay, as well as music video play on MTV, and was effective in concert, while the somewhat softer and evocative "Checkpoint Charlie" also received considerable radio airplay. "Los Desaparecidos" gained praise as an effective protest song on behalf of the 1970s and 1980s victims of state-sponsored forced disappearance in South America. On other songs, the political viewpointing became more strident and was criticized as somewhat artless.

"I Am a Patriot", which held roughly that dissent was not disloyalty, became a favorite song of Jackson Browne, who covered it on his 1989 album World in Motion, and who frequently performed it in his concerts. In 2004, the two would duet on the song during the last of the Vote for Change shows. Pearl Jam has covered the song as well.

In 2019, the album was remastered for release as part of Van Zandt's career-spanning box set Rock N Roll Rebel: The Early Work. The digital deluxe edition of the album was released on October 25, 2019, containing 10 bonus tracks, including the studio outtake "Rock N Roll Rebel", which was written following Van Zandt and Bruce Springsteen's 1983 removal from Disneyland due to their clothing being deemed inappropriate. The digital deluxe edition also includes the reissued Vote! bonus EP.

== Track listing ==
All tracks are written by Steven Van Zandt, except where noted.

No.	Title	Length
1.	"Voice of America"	3:30
2.	"Justice"	3:18
3.	"Checkpoint Charlie"	4:37
4.	"Solidarity"	3:26
5.	"Out of the Darkness"	4:34
6.	"Los Desaparecidos (The Disappeared Ones)"	5:15
7.	"Fear"	4:43
8.	"I Am a Patriot (And the River Opens for the Righteous)"	3:26
9.	"Among the Believers"	3:54
10.	"Undefeated (Everybody Goes Home)"	3:40
Total length:		40:51

1991 CD bonus tracks
No.	Title	Writer(s)	Length
11.	"Vote!" (non-album single, 1984)		3:59
12.	"Caravan" (live; B-side of "Forever", 1982)	Juan Tizol, Duke Ellington	3:56
Total length:			48:46

2019 digital deluxe edition bonus tracks
No.	Title	Writer(s)	Length
11.	"Voice of America radio spot" (1984)		1:07
12.	"Rock N Roll Rebel" (studio track, 1983 – previously unreleased)		5:02
13.	"Caravan" (live at Marquee Club, London, October 18, 1982 – previously unreleased)	Tizol, Ellington	4:17
14.	"I Don't Want to Go Home" (live at Marquee Club, London, October 18, 1982 – previously unreleased)		4:35
15.	"Alive for the First Time" (writing session, the birth of a song, 1983 – previously unreleased)		9:10
16.	"Out of the Darkness" (12" single, 1984)		5:31
17.	"Inside of Me" (live, French TV, 1983 – previously unreleased)		5:14
18.	"US Festival radio spot" (1983)		0:21
19.	"It's Possible" (studio track, mono, date unknown – previously unreleased)		4:23
20.	"Vote! (That Mutha Out)" (12" single, 1984)		4:36
Total length:			85:07

2019 "Vote!" digital bonus EP
No.	Title	Length
1.	"Vote! (That Mutha Out)" (12" single, 1984)	4:36
2.	"Vote! Part II" (rap version) (1984 – previously unreleased)	6:56
3.	"Vote! Part III (After World War III)" (rap version) (12" single, 1984)	6:25
4.	"Vote! Part IV" (instrumental) (12" single, 1984)	4:36
5.	"Vote! Part V" (rap version) (1984 – previously unreleased)	5:11
Total length:		27:44

== Personnel ==
Little Steven and the Disciples of Soul

- Little Steven – lead vocals, guitar, arrangements
- Jean Beauvoir – bass, vocals
- Dino Danelli – drums
- Monti Louis Ellison – congas, African talking drum, shekere, wind chimes, tambourine, timbales, backing vocals
- Pee Wee Weber – keyboards, backing vocals
- Zoë Yanakis – oboe, backing vocals, additional keyboards

Additional musicians

- Gary U.S. Bonds – backing vocals ("Among the Believers")

Technical

- Little Steven – producer, package design
- John Rollo – engineer, production assistance
- Leif Mases – engineer
- Jean Trenchant – engineer
- Bob Clearmountain – mixing
- Zoë Yanakis – production assistance, assistant engineer
- Peter Hefter – assistant engineer
- Malcolm Pollack – additional engineer, assistant mixing engineer
- Peter Millius – additional assistant engineer
- John Davenport – additional assistant engineer
- Mikael Hogstrand – additional assistant engineer
- Dave Greenberg – additional assistant engineer
- Bruce Lampcov – additional assistant engineer
- Wally Traugott – mastering
- Henry Marquez – art direction
- Dino Danelli – package design, song titles design
- Jim Marchese – photography
- Mark Weiss – photography
- CLE Print – reprographics

Bonus tracks

"Vote!"

- Little Steven – lead guitar, producer, arrangement
- Darlene Love – backing vocals
- Jean Beauvoir – co-producer
- Zoë Yanakis – engineer
- Steven Escallier – engineer
- Paul Ray – engineer
- Dominic Maita – engineer
- Steven Thompson – mixing
- Mike Barbiero – mixing
- Greg Calbi – mastering
- Recorded at Pantheon Studios (Arizona), Sunset Sound (Los Angeles), RPM Studios (New York City)

"Caravan", "I Don't Want to Go Home"

- Little Steven – vocals, guitar
- Jean Beauvoir - bas
- Benjamin King - keyboards
- Dino Danelli - drums
- Richie "LaBamba" Rosenberg - trombone
- Crispin Cioe - baritone saxophone
- Arno Hecht - tenor saxophone, flute
- Paul Litteral - trumpet
- Nelson Bogart - trumpet
- Monti Louis Ellison - percussion
- Zoë Yanakis - oboe

"Inside of Me"

- Little Steven – vocals, piano

== Charts ==
Album

Chart (1984)	Peak position
US Billboard 200	55
Norwegian Albums Chart	6
Swedish Albums Chart	8

=== Singles ===
Single	Chart (1984)	Position
"Los Desaparecidos (The Disappeared Ones)"	Mainstream Rock	27
"Out of the Darkness"	Norwegian Singles Chart	8
"Voice of America"	Norwegian Singles Chart	9

- "Vote!" was also released as a single but did not chart.
