= This Time It's for Real =

Studio album by Southside Johnny and the Asbury Jukes
- Released: April 1977
- Recorded: November 1976 – February 1977
- Studio: Columbia Recording Studio, New York, NY
- Genre: R&B, rock, soul
- Length: 43:00
- Label: Epic
- Producer: Sugar Miami Steven Van Zandt

Southside Johnny and the Asbury Jukes chronology
I Don't Want to Go Home (1976)	This Time It's for Real (1977)	Hearts of Stone (1978)

Singles from This Time It's for Real
- 1. "Little Girl So Fine/I Ain't Got The Fever No More" Released: 1977 March 11 (UK); 2. "Without Love/First Night" Released: 1977 April (US-UK); 3. "Love On The Wrong Side Of Town/Some Things Just Don't Change" Released: 1977 October (US)

Professional ratings
Review scores
Source	Rating
AllMusic	4.5/5 stars
The Rolling Stone Album Guide	3/5 stars

This Time It's for Real is the second album by New Jersey band Southside Johnny and the Asbury Jukes, featuring three compositions by Bruce Springsteen and Steven Van Zandt, as well as an additional five by the latter. Like their first album, I Don't Want To Go Home, there are a number of guest artists and duets, a trend that would be dropped for their next album, Hearts of Stone. "Check Mr. Popeye" features Kenny "Popeye" Pentifallo on vocals with The Coasters on background vocals. The track "First Night" features The Five Satins on background vocals and Steven Van Zandt on duet vocals. "Little Girl So Fine" features background vocals by the Drifters.

According to Van Zandt, the two new Springsteen/Van Zandt compositions ("Love on the Wrong Side of Town" and "Little Girl So Fine") were written, at least in part, during recording sessions at Columbia Recording Studio in December 1976. Versions of both songs with unfinished lyrics appear on Van Zandt's compilation album The Early Work, recorded in 1976-77. A third composition, "When You Dance", was written by the pair when they were both members of the Bruce Springsteen Band in 1971.

The front cover photograph of the band was taken at Minetta Street, Greenwich Village, New York City.

== Track listing ==
1. "This Time It's for Real" (Steven Van Zandt) - 4:07
2. "Without Love" (Carolyn Franklin, Ivory Joe Hunter) - 4:32
3. "Check Mr. Popeye" (Dolores Johnson) - 3:56
4. "First Night" (Steven Van Zandt) - 4:38
5. "She Got Me Where She Wants Me" (Steven Van Zandt) - 4:06
6. "Some Things Just Don't Change" (Steven Van Zandt) - 3:39
7. "Little Girl So Fine" (Bruce Springsteen, Steven Van Zandt) - 3:51
8. "I Ain't Got the Fever No More" (Steven Van Zandt) - 5:29
9. "Love on the Wrong Side of Town" (Bruce Springsteen, Steven Van Zandt) - 3:11
10. "When You Dance" (Bruce Springsteen, Steven Van Zandt) - 5:25

== Personnel ==
Musicians

- Southside Johnny – lead vocals, harmonica
- Al Berger - bass, vocals
- Eddie Manion - baritone saxophone, vocals
- Kevin Kavanaugh - piano, vocals
- Kenny "Popeye" Pentifallo - drums, tambourine, vocals ("Check Mr. Popeye")
- Billy Rush (credited as Little Willie Rush) - guitar, vocals
- Richie Rosenberg - trombone, vocals
- Tony Palligrosi - trumpet, vocals
- Carlo Novi - tenor saxophone, vocals
- Steven Van Zandt (credited as SMS) - guitar, vocals (duet "First Night")
- Ernest 'Boom' Carter - conga, tympani
- Bobby Malach - tenor saxophone ("Love On the Wrong Side of Town")
- The Drifters - background vocals ("Little Girl So Fine")
  - Charlie Thomas
  - Doe Greene
  - Ellsbury Hobbs
  - Don Thomas
- The Coasters - background vocals ("Check Mr. Popeye")
  - Carl Gardner
  - Earl Carroll
  - Jimmy Norman
  - Ronnie Bright
- The Five Satins - background vocals ("First Night")
  - Fred Parris
  - Richard Freeman
  - James Curtis
  - Nate Marshall
- Sugar's Strings:
  - Joe Parente - conductor
  - Florence Rosenwig - violin
  - Marion Head - violin
  - David Madison - violin
  - Chock Parker - violin
  - Barbara Sonies - violin
  - Diane Barnets - violin
  - Nardo Poy - viola
  - Pete Rosato - viola
  - Davis Barnett - viola

Production

- Steven Van Zandt - producer
- Don Meehan - engineer
- Ken Robertson - assistant engineer
- Stan Kalina - mastering
