= Ed Manion =

American saxophonist (born 1952)

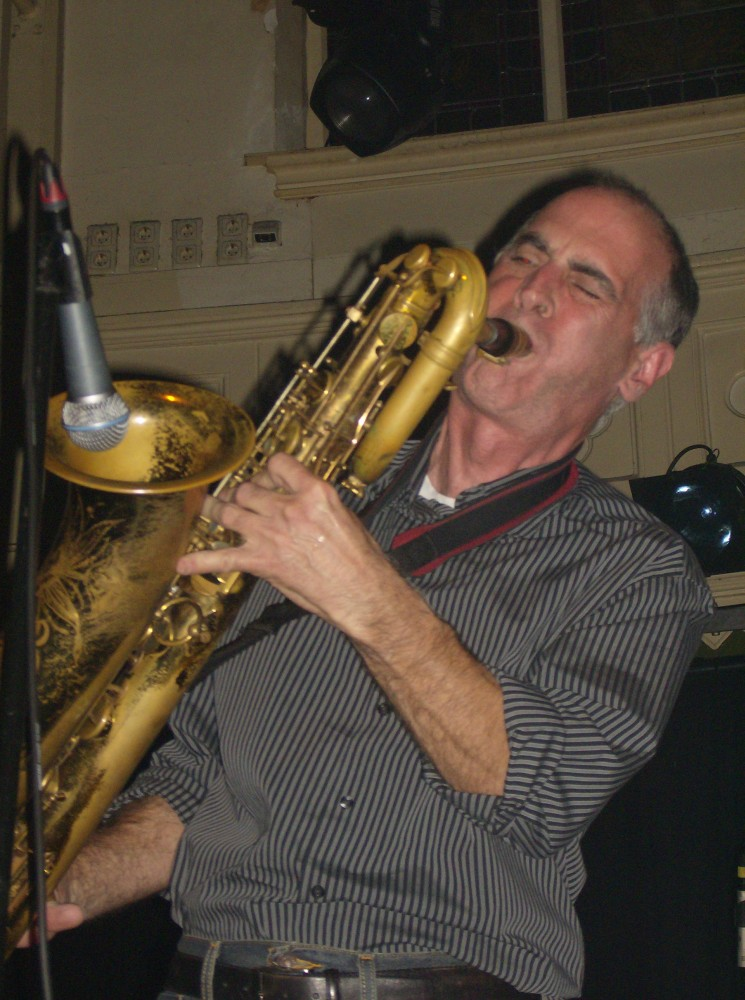
- Manion in 2006

Background information
- Origin: United States
- Occupation: Musician
- Instruments: Tenor sax; baritone sax
- Website: www.eddiemanion.com

Ed Manion (born February 28, 1952), also known as Eddie "Kingfish" Manion, is an American saxophonist, who plays both tenor and baritone sax. As a solo artist, he released his own instrumental album titled Nightlife in 2015. Manion is a recording and touring member of Little Steven and the Disciples of Soul. He is a touring member of the horn section for Bruce Springsteen and the E Street Band and also a member of Bruce Springsteen with The Seeger Sessions Band Tour, later called Bruce Springsteen with The Sessions Band. He is an original member of Southside Johnny and the Asbury Jukes, The Miami Horns, and Little Steven and the Disciples of Soul. As a session musician, he has recorded, toured, and/or performed with, among others, Bruce Springsteen and the E Street Band, Diana Ross, Gary U.S. Bonds, Bon Jovi, Willy DeVille, Dave Edmunds, Bob Dylan, Keith Richards, Darlene Love, Ronnie Spector, Dion, The Allman Brothers Band, Kim Wilson, and Graham Parker. As a solo artist, he released his own CD titled Follow Through in 2004.

== Early years ==
Manion attended Berklee College of Music after graduating from Lakewood High School in 1970 and as a youth played in several bar bands on the Jersey Shore. These included Lazarus who recorded an album in Nashville on the Shelby Singleton Label (Amazon Records) in 1970, The Dark Side and Little Joe and the Kokomo's. It was while playing with these bands along with his late night jamming at the infamous Upstage Club in the late sixties that he first met Southside Johnny and Bruce Springsteen.

== Southside Johnny and the Asbury Jukes ==
In 1976, together with trumpet player Tony Palligrosi, he auditioned and joined the Asbury Jukes. He subsequently became a permanent member of the band's horn section – The Miami Horns. He is featured prominently on the album Hearts of Stone, playing a baritone sax solo on the track "I Played The Fool". In the early 1980s, Manion was also featured on Van Zandt's solo album, Men Without Women, released under the name Little Steven & The Disciples Of Soul. He provided another baritone sax solo on the track "Forever".

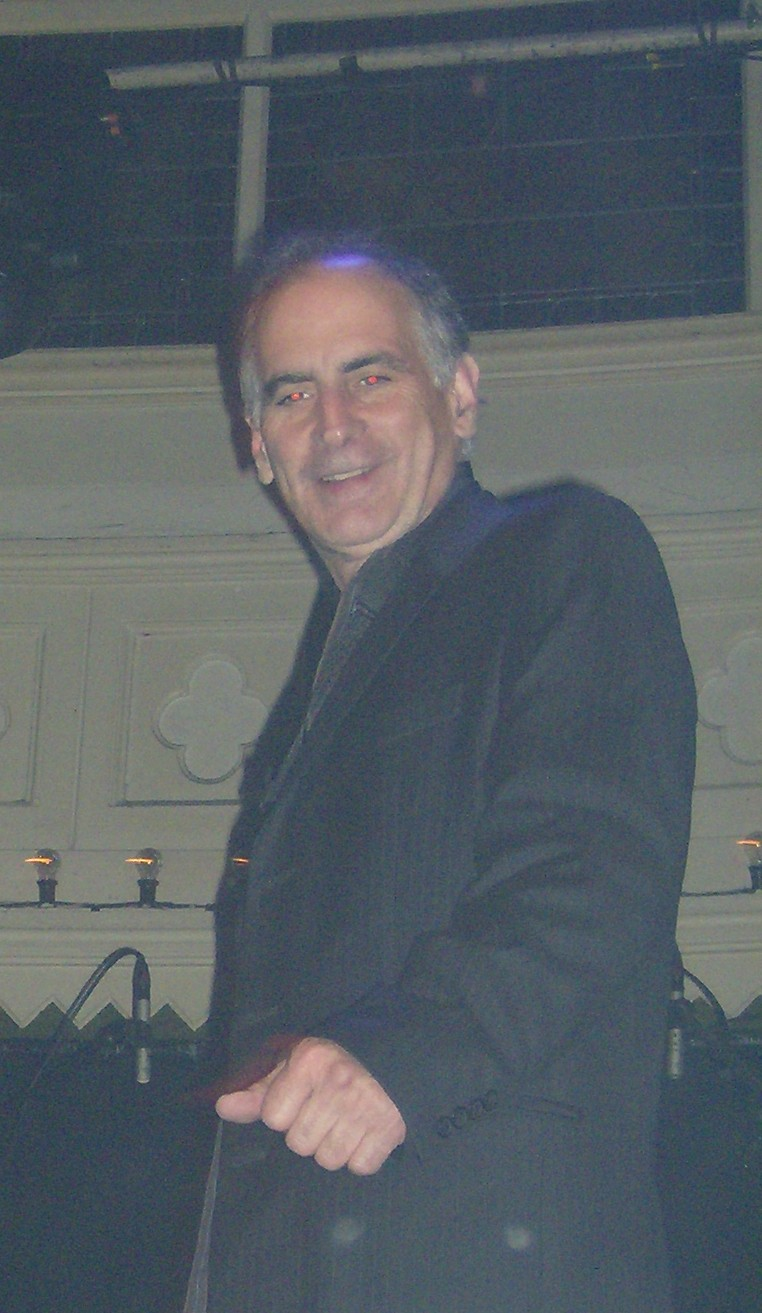
Manion in Amsterdam, 2007

== Bruce Springsteen and the E Street Band ==
On 2/1/09 Manion performed and played baritone sax as part of a 5-piece horn section with Bruce Springsteen and the E Street Band during the halftime show at Super Bowl XLIII in Tampa, Florida. He has also toured and recorded intermittently with Bruce Springsteen and the E Street Band. He first toured with Springsteen in August 1976 during the Born to Run tour. During the Born in the U.S.A. Tour, together with The Miami Horns, Richie "La Bamba" Rosenberg (trombone), Mark Pender (trumpet), Mike Spengler (trumpet) and Stan Harrison (tenor sax), Manion also made several guest appearances, most notably at Meadowlands Arena in August 1984; a version of "Tenth Avenue Freeze-Out" from that date is included on the Live/1975-85 album. The subsequent Tunnel of Love Express Tour of 1988, did however feature a horn section much more prominently. Manion together with Rosenberg, Pender, Spengler and Mario Cruz, sometimes referred to as The Tunnel Of Love Horns, accompanied Springsteen throughout the tour. They also made occasional guest appearances during the Human Rights Now! Tour. From 2012-2014, Manion was part of the E Street Horns appearing on the Wrecking Ball World Tour and High Hopes Tour. He once again joined Springsteen and the E Street Band for the 2023-2024 Tour as a part of the horn section.

== Robert Cray ==
Between 1991 and 1994, Manion was also a full-time member of The Robert Cray Band and played alongside B.B. King, Albert Collins and John Lee Hooker. Together with trumpet player Mark Pender, they played and arranged horns on the Grammy-nominated Cray album, Shame + A Sin.

== Discography ==
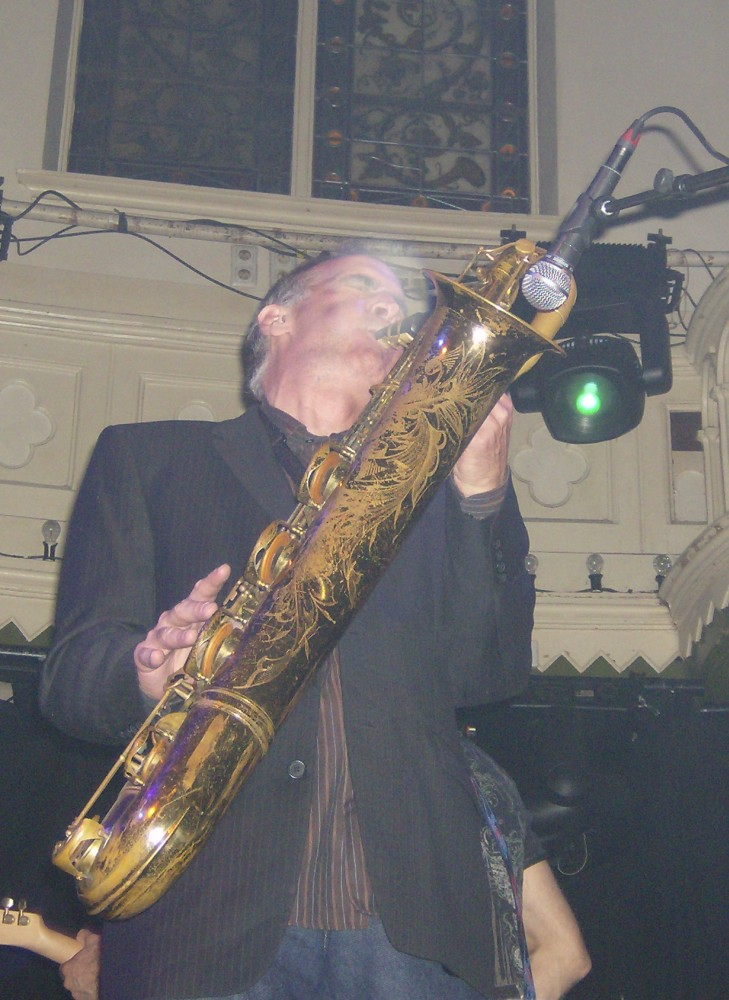
Manion performing with the Asbury Jukes in Amsterdam, 2007

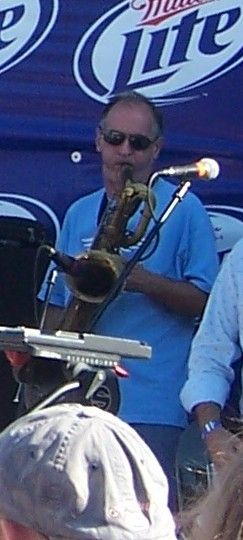
Manion performing with the Asbury Jukes in New Jersey, 2008

- Eddie Manion
- Nightlife (2015)
- Follow Through (2004)
- Southside Johnny & The Asbury Jukes
  - Live At The Bottom Line (1976)
  - This Time It's For Real (1977)
  - Hearts Of Stone (1978)
  - The Jukes (1979)
  - Love Is A Sacrifice (1980)
  - Reach Up and Touch The Sky (1981)
  - Better Days (1992)
  - Messin' With The Blues (2000)
  - Goin' To Jukesville (2002)
  - Into the Harbour (2005)
- Southside Johnny & La Bambas Big Band
  - Grapefruit Moon - The Songs of Tom Waits (2008)
- Bruce Springsteen
  - Live/1975-85 (1986)
  - Chimes Of Freedom (1988)
  - Tracks (1998)
  - 18 Tracks (1999)
  - The Rising (2002)
  - We Shall Overcome: The Seeger Sessions (2006)
  - Live In Dublin (2007)
  - Wrecking Ball (2012)
  - High Hopes (2014)
  - Western Stars (2019)
- Graham Parker
  - Burning Questions (1992)
  - No Holding Back (1996)
- Debbie Davies
  - Picture This (1993)
  - Loose Tonight (1994)
- Selected Others
  - Gary U.S. Bonds: Dedication (1981)
  - Little Steven & The Disciples Of Soul: Men Without Women (1982)
  - Various artists: Home Alone 2: Lost in New York (1992)(soundtrack)
  - Robert Cray: Shame + A Sin (1993)
  - Bon Jovi: These Days (1995)
  - Various artists: Where Have All The Flowers Gone (1998)
  - Various Artists: Every Woman's Blues (1998)
  - Culture Club : Greatest Moments - VH1 Storytellers Live (1998)
  - Various artists: A Very Special Christmas 5 (2001)
  - The Misfits: Project 1950 (2003)
