= Stan Harrison =

American saxophonist (born 1953)

- Born: December 8, 1953 (age 72)
- Instruments: Saxophone; French horn; flute; clarinet

Stan Harrison (born December 8, 1953) is an American saxophonist who is also accomplished in playing other woodwind instruments, namely the flute and clarinet, as well as the French horn. He has also written music for television. Harrison released his first solo album The Ties That Blind in 2000 on his own record label. In 2007, he released The Optimist, an album which was produced by G TOM MAC, on the EdgeArtists record label. In 2024, he released his third solo album Some Poor Soul Has a Fire on Adhyâropa Records on Bandcamp.

== Artists ==
The following are some of the prominent artists with whom Harrison has played and/or recorded:

- Bruce Springsteen
- Diana Ross
- David Bowie
- Duran Duran
- Gary Private
- Jewel
- Jonathan Coulton
- Lee Palmer
- Little Steven
- Mick Jagger
- Najma Akhtar
- Radiohead
- Serge Gainsbourg
- Southside Johnny
- Stevie Ray Vaughan
- Talking Heads
- They Might Be Giants

== Discography ==
- The Ties That Blind (2000)
- The Optimist (2007)
- Some Poor Soul has a Fire (2024)
