= Quincy Mumford =

American guitarist and singer-songwriter (born 1991)

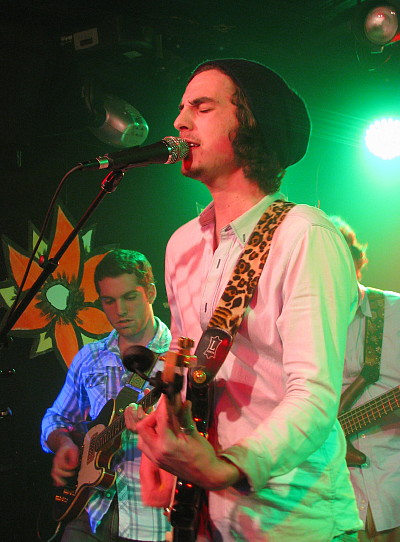
- Quincy Mumford and The Reason Why recording live album at The Saint, Asbury Park, NJ, March 2012

Background information
- Born: December 18, 1991 (age 34); Asbury Park, New Jersey, U.S.
- Genres: Rock, funk, soul, reggae, singer-songwriter, alternative, R&B
- Occupations: Singer-songwriter, bandleader
- Instruments: Guitar, vocals, bass
- Years active: 2008–present
- Label: Lifted Records
- Website: QuincyMumford.com

Quincy Mumford (born December 18, 1991) is an American guitarist and singer-songwriter. He has released several solo albums since his debut in 2008, and is also rhythm guitarist and frontman of the band Quincy Mumford & The Reason Why, a five-person group based in Asbury Park, New Jersey. Mumford's style has been described as "funk, soul and surf music, with a dash of reggae thrown in." After the release of his second album South Edgemere, he won three Asbury Music Awards in 2009, including Best Male Acoustic Act. That year MSNBC also named Mumford one of their "1 of 10 up and coming young artists."

He and the band were featured in the rockumentary Calm Before the Storm in 2012. The film was released in conjunction with the live album and DVD titled Live at the Saint, which was voted by WBJB 90.5 The Night as the No. 7 Top Album released in 2012. The band has performed at venues such as Gathering of the Vibes, Musikfest and Appel Farm and toured with artists including Slightly Stoopid, G-Love and Rusted Root.

== Early life ==
Quincy Mumford was born in Asbury Park, New Jersey in 1991 and grew up in the nearby seaside town of Allenhurst, New Jersey. His parents were both music lovers and exposed Mumford to a wide variety of genres in his youth, with artists including Talking Heads, Bob Marley, Peter Tosh, Pink Floyd, and Sublime.

"I started writing music so I could express my emotion, and put it to pen and paper. There is nothing more rewarding then a finished song. I write so that the people that listen can hear my stories and relate them to their own lives and feelings, in hopes that they reach a new light."
— Quincy Mumford in Highlight Magazine

Mumford was nine years old and in the fourth grade when his neighbor, future bandmate Brian Gearty, picked up bass and encouraged Mumford to learn guitar so they could form a punk band. By the age of eleven Mumford was engrossed in the pop punk scene, attending concerts for bands such as Blink-182. According to Mumford, "My parents were totally cool with it. I’d just show up, this little 12 year old with blue liberty spikes." He was educated in Ocean Township, New Jersey, playing trumpet in the school band and taking guitar lessons.

He was thirteen when he started singing and writing his own music, focusing on punk. However, after hearing Jack Johnson's album In Between Dreams he began taking songwriting more seriously, stating "I started listening to a lot more funk and soul music, just feel-good music. And the whole vibe changed." Around the age of fifteen he started performing at open mics around town.

Mumford attributes the development of his laid back style of pop, funk, rock, and reggae to growing up in Allenhurst, where his primary pastimes were surfing, skateboarding in the empty Allenhurst pool, and hanging out on the boardwalk or by the lagoons. Growing up in an urban environment, Mumford says he also leaned towards hip hop music, and has at times incorporated it into his music.

== Career ==
=== 2007–08: Debut and live band ===
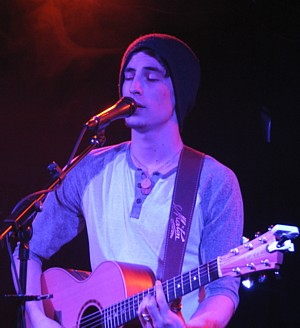
Mumford playing at The Saint in Asbury Park, NJ in 2011

When he was nearing the age of sixteen Mumford met producer Jon Leidersdorff of Lakehouse Music, and shortly afterwards they began recording Mumford's first album. Stated Mumford, "I wrote music all of the time, and finally found someone who was interested in recording me. They believed in me and taught me a lot about the industry and music." Mumford was sixteen when his debut album Quincy Mumford was released on June 10, 2008.

Soon after recording his first album Mumford formed a live band, which was a change from his usual habit of performing as an acoustic solo act in coffee shops and open mics. Brian Gearty joined first as bassist, and a drummer joined them shortly after. The band was named Quincy Mumford & The Reason Why, and Mumford stated the name was chosen because "There’s a reason for everything. The reason why we play music, the reason why people show up to see us, the reason why there’s good vibes, the list goes on." The group performed as a trio for around a year, frequently playing at The Stone Pony in Asbury Park.

Around 2009 the live band expanded to five members, with Karlee Bloomfield joining on keys. Mumford first met Bloomfield at a concert when he was opening for the band DeSol at age sixteen. Stated Mumford, "[Bloomfield]'s always been involved in the process of [The Reason Why], even before I released records with the band itself." The live band spent its first few years performing 3 to 4-hour sets at bars, and according to Mumford, "As a band it forced us to learn and create more songs. It also got us to become very tight together, and become better as a group."

=== 2009–11: South Edgemere and Speak ===
In 2009 Mumford self-released the full-length album South Edgemere, drawing the album cover himself. It was again produced by Jon Ledersdorff, who also produced Mumford's next release, Speak, in 2011. After the release of South Edgmere Mumford was the recipient of three Asbury Music Awards. He won Best Male Acoustic Act and him and his band, The Reason Why, won Album of the Year (for Sound Edgemere) and Song of the Year (for "Can’t Break Free") in 2009. Quincy Mumford & the Reason Why won the Asbury Park Music Award for Top Young Band Under 21 in 2010. That year MSNBC also named Mumford one of their "1 of 10 up and coming young artists."

Mumford's third album Speak was released in April 2011, which The Aquarian's John Pfeiffer says is "a high point for Mumford as it has separated him from that Dave Matthews, jammy high school vibe and purified his atmosphere with some truly memorable sounds, and stand out compositions of a seasoning writer." One of the songs featured singer-songwriter Glen Burtnik of Styx as a guest artist. Speak went on to rank number 10 in the top 90 albums of 2011 on 90.5 The Night's year end countdown. Quincy Mumford & the Reason Why won the Asbury Park Music Award for Top Pop Band in 2011. Overall, the band has been nominated for sixteen Asbury Music Awards.

=== 2012: Live at the Saint ===
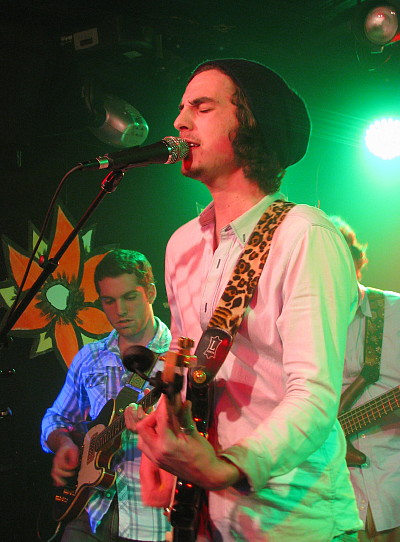
Quincy Mumford during the recording of his 2012 live album at The Saint.

As of March 2012 the band was working on a rockumentary about their live performances and their trip to Vermont to prepare for their tour. Released the following year and directed by Kyle Mumford, it was titled Calm Before the Storm. Also in March 2012 the band recorded both a live album and DVD in Asbury Park, their home town. It was the first recording to officially feature The Reason Why on the lead credits, and the footage and tracks were taken from three sold-out shows performed over two days at The Saint. The concerts also served as a fundraiser for Clean Ocean Action. The album, entitled Live at The Saint, was released May 25, 2012. It features versions of songs from their last three studio albums, and a DVD was also released in conjunction with the CD, including concert footage, band interviews, and a documentary about the band. Directed by Kyle Mumford, it was filmed by Lifted Pictures. The album was voted by WBJB 90.5 The Night as the No. 7 Top Album released in 2012.

=== 2012–13: Touring and television ===
Quincy Mumford and The Reason Why performed at the Appel Farm Arts and Music Festival with Jukebox The Ghost, Dawes, The Tedeschi Trucks Band, and others in June 2012. For their first few albums Mumford and the live band regularly toured down the east coast to Florida and along the northeast corridor to Vermont. In 2013 the band had begun touring the midwest as well, reaching states such as Michigan and Ohio.

Mumford has had several songs released on television; his single "Now That I Met You" was used on a commercial for Walt Disney World, and he has had music used on the Inside the Big East television show on ESPNU.

=== 2013–14: It's Only Change ===
"A Hard Place"
Excerpt from "A Hard Place"

In 2013 the band drove to Nashville to record their album It's Only Change with producer Ken Coomer, former drummer for the band Wilco. Mumford and Coomer had first met after Mumford mistakenly entered a funk song into a country songwriting contest. Coomer, judging the contest, took a liking to the song despite the error, and contacted Mumford about recording together. It's Only Change was the first album Mumford recorded outside of Asbury Park, with guest musicians including Jerry Roe, David Labruyere, and Aubrey Freed. On several tracks Coomer contributed drums. As the band had only ten days available to use the studio, they recorded on tape for 12 to 13 hours each day. It was mixed by Phil Nicolo (Bob Dylan, The Police) in Philadelphia's Studio 4.

It's Only Change was released on July 6, 2013, with a CD release party at Urban Nest in Asbury Park. On July 9, 2013, the song "A Hard Place," the first single from the album, was premiered on Guitar World. The CD was released on a national level on July 30. That summer Quincy Mumford & The Reason Why promoted the album with a tour of New Jersey, performing at FirstEnergy Park at the Jersey Shore Music Festival on July 20, 2013. By September they had toured as far south as Gainesville, Florida, ending the tour with a show at the Algonquin Theatre in Manasquan, New Jersey.

"In the past, I have written an album over the course of months or years, and compiled all of my songs into one list to choose from. Most of the songs had nothing to do with each other. For the first time, I really feel like this is a complete album. The songs...all come back to the idea of 'change.'"
— Quincy Mumford in 2013

External videos
- Quincy Mumford – Bring 'Em Home (official video) from 2013
- Quincy Mumford & The Reason Why – A Hard Place (Official Video) from 2013

It's Only Change incorporates the genres of rock, soul, jazz, funk and hip-hop, with CL Tampa writing that the album "employs a breezy free-for-all style of indie rock with a 1970s Jeff Beckian-groove that’s brightened up with funk, soul, R&B, jazz, reggae and hip-hop flavors, and Mumford’s warm and husky vocals sliding over top." Mumford describes it as his first concept album, stating "This record is like nothing I have ever done before. For the first time, I was able to mesh all of my influences into one complete piece of work." Also, "The record is kind of like a story. Every song relates to each other, and has the same constant theme of 'change.' Change is never an easy thing to go through, but we do it everyday [sic?] and we must learn to embrace it, and not let it overcome us." As inspiration for the theme and certain lyrics, Mumford has referenced a long-distance relationship he was maintaining at the time he was writing the songs. "Traveling back and forth for years, and it became very difficult, a lot of ‘wheres’ involved and money. That became a big focus of my life. And right before I went to record the album, [the girl] who is my wife now, finally moved over here [from Sweden], and moved in with me. And we finally got to put all that crap behind us, and start living our lives."

=== 2013–14: Recent touring ===
Mumford began touring heavily in 2009 with his live band, and by early 2014 had played over 400 shows. He has toured with artists such as Slightly Stoopid, Rusted Root, moe., Donavon Frankenreiter, and Tedeschi Trucks Band, and performed at festivals such as the Gathering of the Vibes and Musikfest. As of 2014 Quincy Mumford & The Reason Why continued to tour in support of It's Only Change. They headlined a six-week tour of the United States in the summer of 2014, playing over forty shows from June to August. The band also held what it dubbed a "super jam" at certain cities such as New Orleans, inviting local musicians to join them onstage for a jam session, covering songs from groups such as The Meters and James Brown. Quincy Mumford and the Reason Why started its "Keep it Lifted" tour in Buffalo on July 2, 2014.

== Band lineup ==
Quincy Mumford and the Reason Why
- Years active: 2008–present
- Members: Quincy Mumford, Nick Iannelli, PJ Corallo, Mike Zdeb, Davide Vossel
- Past members: Brian Gearty, Travis Lyon, Jeff Mann
- Website: The Reason Why at Facebook

Current as of 2014

- Quincy Mumford – front man, lead singer, rhythm guitar (2007–present)
- Brett Mayer – keys, backup vocals
- Nick Iannelli – bass, backup vocals
- Ian Thompson – Keys, percussion
- Davide "Sister Dave" Vossel – drums

Past

- Brian Greary – bass, vocals (2007–2013)
- Travis Lyon – guitar
- Jeff Mann – drums
- Karlee Bloomfield – keyboards

== Style and equipment ==
Instruments

Quincy Mumford as of 2012 primarily played an Australian-made Maton acoustic guitar, writing "I bought it after playing it a bunch in the studio. I fell in love with the tone and style of the guitar." He also is known to perform and record with a "50 anniversary Fender Strat."

Genre and style

Mumford's style has been described as "funk, soul and surf music, with a dash of reggae thrown in" by Jean Mikle of the Asbury Park Press. The Aquarian Weekly wrote in 2013 that "With a unique blend of reggae, rock, funk and other elements, [the band puts] on a show that gets everyone on their feet." About his genre combinations and songwriting, Mumford clarifies that "I get a big inspiration from reggae rusic, along with any kind of groove based music. Anywhere from hip-hop, to soul, to funk, to singer songwriter." Mumford has also expressed interest in recording a hip hop album, stating "I love hip hop so much, and occasionally spit raps in my songs live. I think it could be a killer side project."

According to Mumford, early influences on his sound included rock or R&B artists such as John Legend, John Mayer, Paul Simon, G. Love, Soulive, and as of 2013 he was avidly listening to artists such as funk band Lettuce and singer-songwriter Ryan Montbleau as well. He has also referenced singer-songwriter Ray Lamontagne as an influence concerning the mixing of genres.

== Personal life ==
As of 2014 Mumford continues to live in Asbury Park, New Jersey with his wife, who moved to the state from her native Sweden in 2012. Mumford was the co-founder of Lifted Apparel, a clothing re-branding company he co-founded with his brother Kyle. Now defunct, the company offered Chinese made T-shirts and hats printed with slogans and the Lifted logo. His family is still involved with his career, with his father managing him part-time and his brother shooting music videos. Mumford often volunteers for The Surfrider Foundation and other environmental causes such as Clean Ocean Action.

== Awards and nominations ==
Year	Award	Nominated work	Category	Result
2009	Asbury; Music Awards	Quincy Mumford	Best Male Acoustic Act	Won
2009	Asbury; Music Awards	Sound Edgemere	Album of the Year	Won
2009	Asbury; Music Awards	"Can’t Break Free"	Song of the Year	Won
2010	Asbury; Music Awards	The Reason Why	Top Young Band Under 21	Won
2011	Asbury; Music Awards	The Reason Why	Top Pop Band	Won
2013	Asbury; Music Awards	The Reason Why	Top Pop Band	Won
2014	Tri State Indie Music Awards	The Reason Why	Top New Jersey Band	Won

== Discography ==
=== Albums ===
Studio and live albums by Quincy Mumford
Year	Album title	Release details
2008	Quincy Mumford	Released: June 10, 2008; Label: Self-released; Format: CD, digital
2009	Sound Edgemere	Released: October 3, 2009; Label: Self-released; Format: CD, digital
2011	Speak	Released: April 1, 2011; Label: Self-released; Format: CD, digital
2012	Live at The Saint (with The Reason Why)	Released: May 19, 2012; Label: Self-released; Format: CD, digital
2013	It's Only Change (with The Reason Why)	Released: July 30, 2013; Label: Lifted Records; Format: CD, digital

=== Singles ===
Selected songs by Quincy Mumford
Year	Title	Album	Certifications
2008	"My Town"	Quincy Mumford	
2009	"Can’t Break Free"	South Edgemere	
2011	"Sunshine"	Speak	
2013	"A Hard Place"	Its Only Change	Exclusive to Guitar World

=== DVDs ===
Studio and live albums by Quincy Mumford
Year	Album title	Release details
2012	Live at The Saint (with The Reason Why)	Released: May 19, 2012; Label: Self-released; Format: Concert DVD w/documentary

=== Documentaries ===
- 2013: Calm Before the Storm directed by Kyle C. Mumford (Lifted Enterprises)

== See also ==
- List of singer-songwriters
