= Oxford Circus =

Road junction in London, England

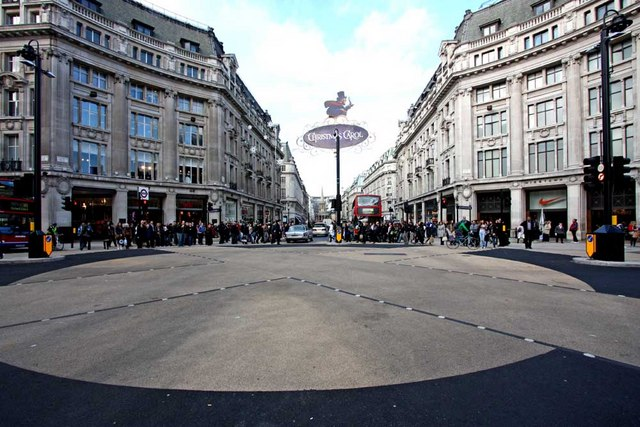
- Oxford Circus in November 2009
- Interactive map of Oxford Circus

Location
- West End of London
- Coordinates: 51°30′55″N 00°08′31″W
- Roads at junction: Oxford Street; Regent Street

Construction
- Type: Road junction
- Opened: November 1819
- Maintained by: Transport for London

Oxford Circus is a road junction connecting Oxford Street and Regent Street in the West End of London. It is also the entrance to Oxford Circus tube station.

The junction opened in 1819 as part of the Regent Street development under John Nash, and was originally known as Regent Circus North. After the original lease expired, it was redesigned around a series of four quadrant buildings by Henry Tanner between 1913 and 1928, the north-eastern of which has been used by Peter Robinson, Topshop, the BBC and the London Co-operative Society; these are now Grade II listed buildings.

Oxford Circus remains a busy junction for traffic, and a £5 million upgrade for pedestrians opened in 2009. It has also attracted attention as a place for demonstrations and protests, including several by Extinction Rebellion.

== History ==
=== 19th century ===
The Life Guards parading across Regent Circus North around 1840, past The London General Mourning Warehouse

The junction was designed as part of John Nash's work on Regent Street. Circuses had become popular in English architecture after George Dance the Younger had popularised them in the Minories in East London. Nash wanted to use extra land space so that vehicles could move around one another when turning, with a concave layout attracting shopkeepers and increasing the potential for land value. He originally intended the circus to be colonnaded, but when the New Street Bill was proposed to parliament, it was rejected, with one MP fearing the circus would "be a nuisance by day and something worse by night". He redesigned the circus so that the new Regent Street would meet the established Oxford Street at a near right-angle, with a smaller 164-foot (50 m) diameter reducing its land intake. Parliament approved the design, passing the New Street Act 1813 (53 Geo. 3. c. 121).

Construction of the circus began in 1816, with Nash working in association with Samuel Baxter. Work was complicated by the compulsory purchase of properties along Oxford Street. Eight houses on the north side and eleven on the south were demolished to make way for the junction. To avoid legal challenges, Nash attempted to rehouse existing tenants in the new buildings around the circus wherever possible. After John Richardson, proprietor of Richardson's silk shop on 118 Oxford Street died, Nash ensured his widow and surviving family and employees were all housed in a building on the circus's north-eastern section. After the family complained and demanded changes, Nash worked with Baxter to try to accommodate them as much as possible.

Most buildings around the circus were designed in a more disciplined manner than some of Nash's later work, and were based on Palladian architecture. They featured fluted Corinthian pilasters and artificial stone capitals. The pilaster order continued down Regent Street.

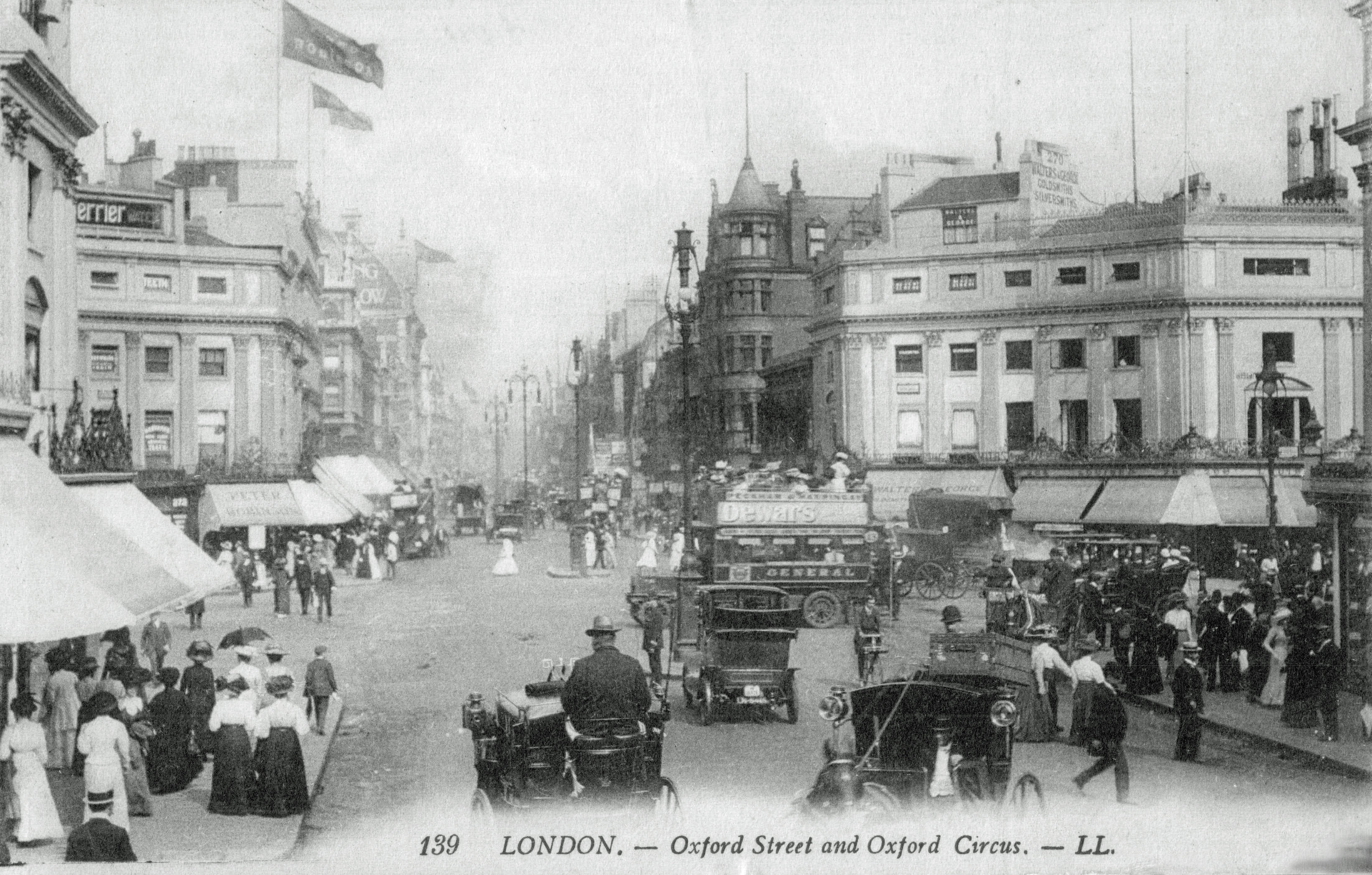
Oxford Circus in 1904, still showing John Nash's original design

The circus opened officially in November 1819. It was originally known as Regent Circus North, with the corresponding Piccadilly Circus named Regent Circus South. However, unlike Piccadilly Circus, Oxford Circus had no decorations and was designed as a straightforward traffic crossing. Fellow architect James Elmes described Nash's work on the circus as giving "an air of grandeur" and "as elegant in form as it is useful in application". The current name began to be used around 1836.

In 1842, the MP Joseph Hume proposed a commemorative obelisk should be constructed in the middle of the circus. Construction began in December 1842, but was quickly disrupted and abandoned after the Marylebone parish vestry realised they only had authority to clean and maintain the circus, and not to construct anything on top of it. The obelisk was eventually built in 1850 at Nunhead Cemetery to a slightly different design.

In the Victorian era, mourning was elaborate and expensive. This area had mourning warehouses, selling the clothes, fabrics and accessories required for this. The most important of these was The London General Mourning Warehouse, commonly known as Jay's. This was founded in Regent Street in 1841 and expanded north so that it occupied all of the SW quadrant of the circus by 1880.

=== 20th century ===
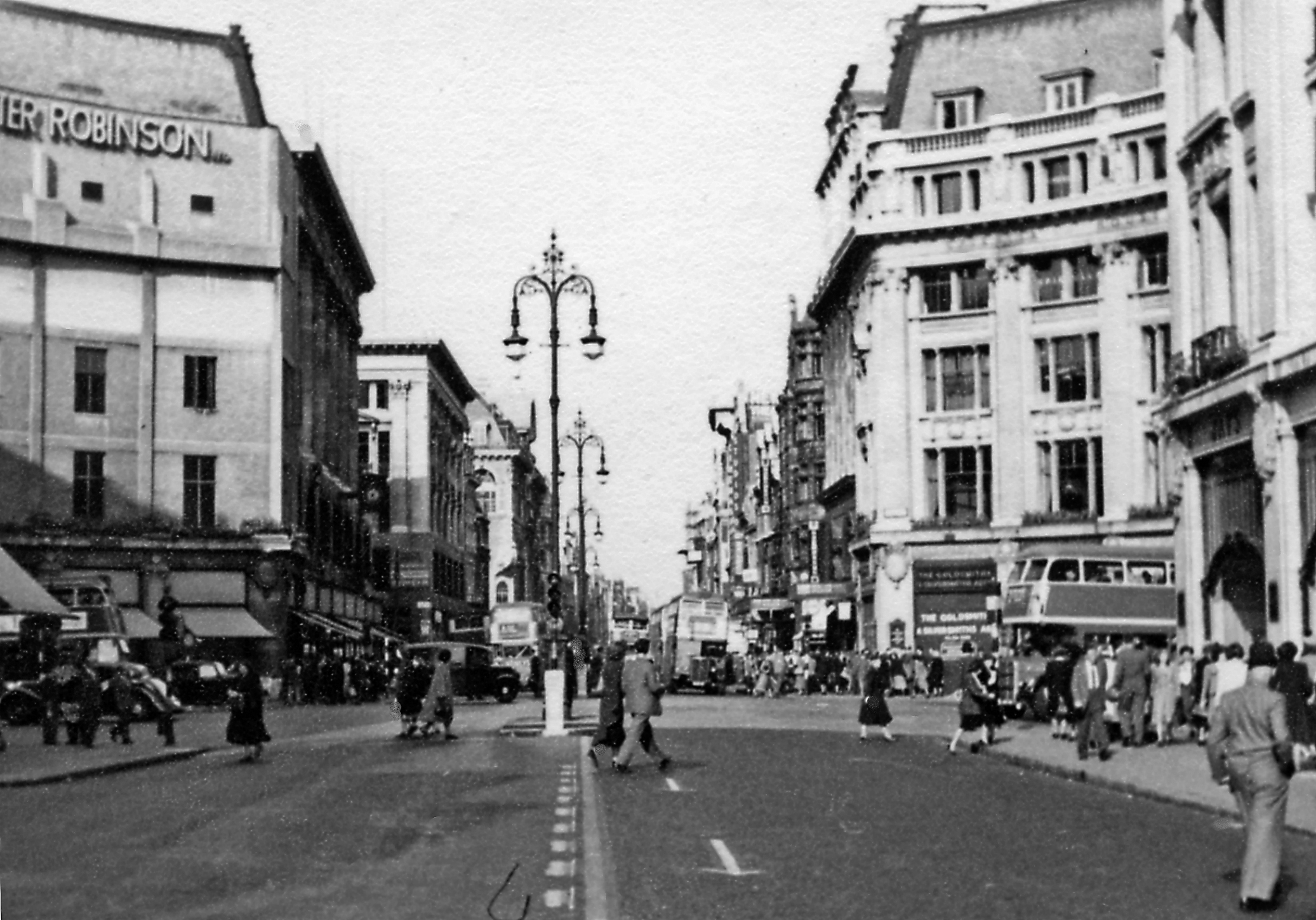
Oxford Circus in 1949 with temporary facade to the Peter Robinson building

The lease on the four quadrants around the interchange was due to expire in 1917, and it was determined they would need to be rebuilt. In 1904, the Commissioners of Woods and Forests outlined a plan to redevelop Regent Street, including Oxford Circus. In 1909, they invited proposals to redevelop the site. The new design was awarded in October 1910 to Henry Tanner, who saw off several rival designs, and was built in stages between 1913 and 1928. Tanner's design was inspired by 18th-century French architecture, particularly that of Ange-Jacques Gabriel. Each quadrant was designed to be symmetrical with the others.

The south-eastern quadrant was completed first in 1913, before work stopped at the beginning of World War I. The north-western quadrant opened in May 1922 as the London premises for the Magasins du Louvre. The store was never popular and closed in 1930. The south-western quadrant followed in 1925 and the north-eastern in 1928.

The new north-eastern quadrant was originally occupied by the Peter Robinson department store. An extension to the store was added to the original quadrant building in 1924. During World War II, it was badly damaged by bombs in September 1940 but survived owing to its steel frame construction and was quickly repaired to a high standard. The BBC requisitioned part of the block and it saw significant use in overseas broadcasting during the war. It was sold to the London Co-operative Society in 1944. In 1969, the fourth floor of the Peter Robinson department store was leased by producer George Martin's Associated Independent Recording company, which opened the first AIR Studios recording complex there the following year, with the studio operating in this location until 1991. Through a series of buyouts and mergers, Peter Robinson became Topshop, which occupied the site until 2020, after it went into liquidation. It was the flagship store of the franchise, covering four floors and attracting around 28,000 shoppers a day, half of whom would buy something.

The buildings are constructed of Portland stone with a cladding steel frame and slate roofs. They have been Grade II listed since 1973.

== Tube station ==
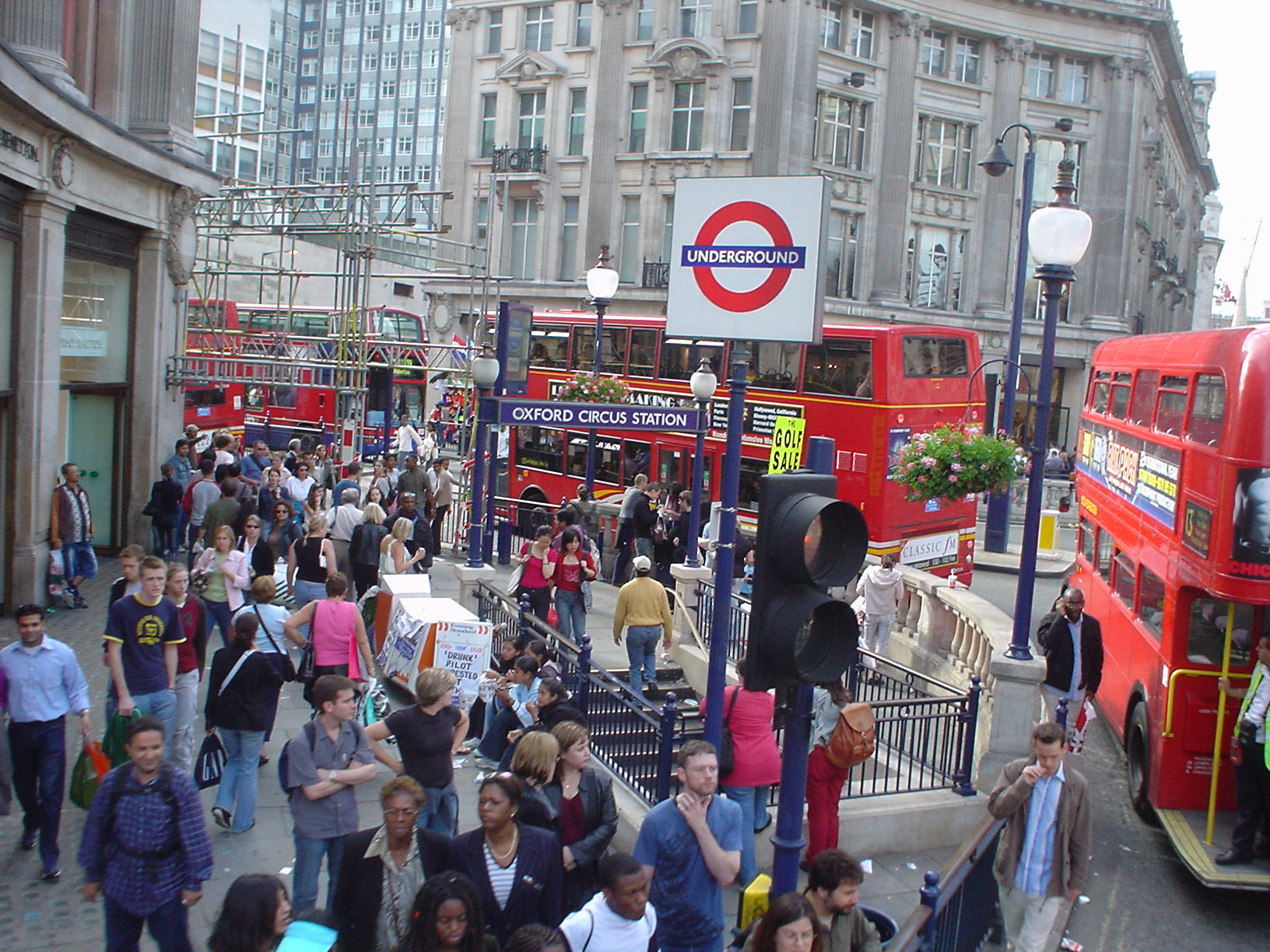
One of the entrances to Oxford Circus tube station

The tube station opened on 30 July 1900 when the first section of the Central line opened. A connection to the Bakerloo line opened on 10 March 1906; the station was modified below ground to accommodate this.

For five years from 1963 as part of connecting the tube station to the Victoria line, the road surface was carried on a temporary 850-ton umbrella bridge, accommodating all four directions of travel while work continued underneath. This was dismantled on 12 April 1968. In 1976, a 20-pound (9.1 kg) bomb planted by the Provisional IRA was detected at the station and successfully defused. The station was badly damaged by fire in November 1984, but there were no fatalities.

== Traffic ==
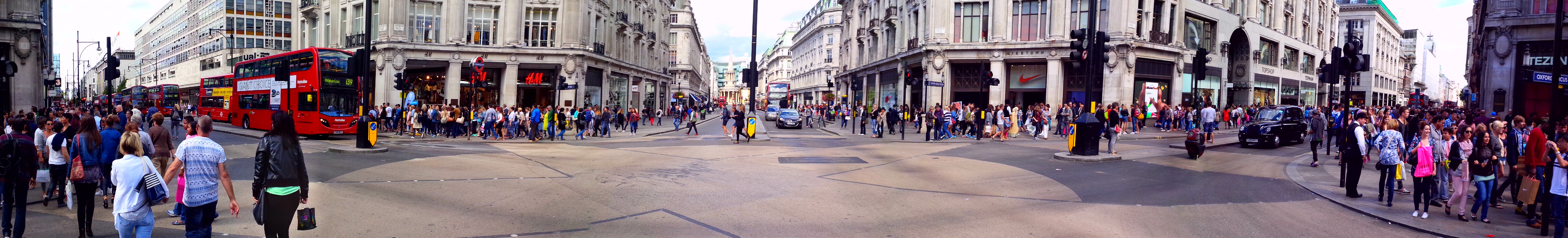
Panorama view of the Oxford Circus diagonal crossing, 2014

Oxford Circus is one of the busiest pedestrian crossings in London. In 1924, shipbuilder Alfred Yarrow proposed building a grade-separated junction to segregate traffic, paid for by his own funds. The offer was turned down by Westminster City Council. In 1935, Westminster City Council proposed fitting pedestrian guard rails at the junction, restricting crossing in order to improve safety.

At the end of the 2000s, Oxford Circus had the highest pedestrian volumes recorded anywhere in London. At the busiest times, over 40,000 pedestrians per hour pass through the junction, including those accessing the tube station. The average traffic flow is around 2,000 vehicles per hour during the week, and the junction operates at near capacity for most of the day with regular queues, particularly west along Oxford Street. 24 bus routes pass through Oxford Circus, and over 400 buses cross the junction on an average weekday. There are bus stops within 200 metres (660 ft) on every arm of the crossing.

In 2009, Transport for London redesigned the intersection to facilitate a pedestrian scramble. The crossing opened in November and cost around £5 million. It was inspired by street crossings in Tokyo, and opened by the Mayor of London, Boris Johnson, who called the scheme "a triumph for British engineering, Japanese innovation and good old fashioned common sense". The scheme added an additional 312 square metres (3,360 sq ft) of pedestrian space and removed the guard rail, adding 70% more capacity to the crossing.

== Events ==
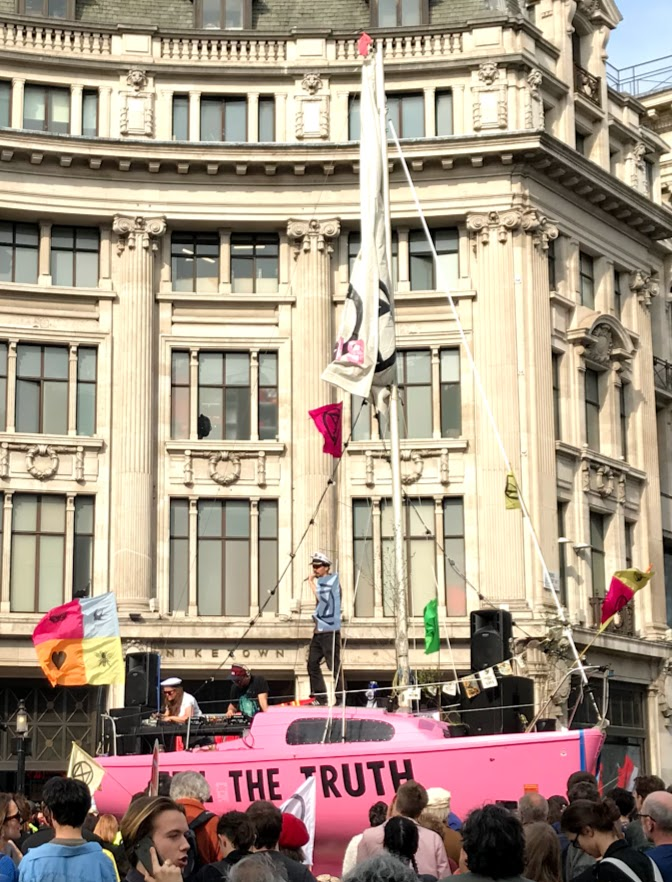
Extinction Rebellion protesting in Oxford Circus with the Berta Cáceres boat

In February 1872, a tripartite arch made of flowers and decorated with flags was erected in the middle of Oxford Circus, to commemorate the Prince of Wales's recovery from typhoid fever. Queen Victoria passed along the parade with the Prince to a crowd of cheering children.

On 20 December 1938, 50 people took part in an unemployment protest staged in Oxford Circus. Campaigners threw themselves into the road shouting "We want work, we want bread", before being restrained by police.

On 1 May 2001, an anti-capitalism demonstration converging on Oxford Circus broke into violence. Police attempted to contain the crowd in the circus, but 50–60 demonstrators broke free and started destroying property and set fire to a nearby shop. Along with 3,000 others, Lois Austin was kept kettled in the circus for around 7 hours. She later appealed to the European Court of Human Rights.

On 26 March 2011, around 500,000 protested against government public service cuts in London. At Oxford Circus, they clashed with riot police.

On Black Friday, 24 November 2017, the Oxford Circus panic broke out after a fight in Oxford Circus tube station turned into a mass stampede. The area was busy and commuters and shoppers took refuge in shops. The Metropolitan Police later announced it would stand down the response.

In April 2019, the environmental group Extinction Rebellion protested by blockading Oxford Circus. Protesters chained themselves to the road, and the Metropolitan Police drafted additional police officers to help clear the area, who helped tear down a pink boat named after the environmental activist Berta Cáceres. In October, protesters erected a giant wooden pyramid structure in the centre of the circus, which had to be dismantled by a JCB.

In August 2019, a protest against the imprisonment of far-right extremist Tommy Robinson at the circus descended into violence. A man was arrested for actual bodily harm.
