= Days Awake =

- Origin: Asbury Park, New Jersey, U.S.
- Genres: Alternative rock
- Years active: 2003–2009, 2016

Days Awake is an American rock band from Asbury Park, New Jersey. Collectively, they were the recipients of eleven Asbury Music Awards.

== Original Music ==
- Someday Somewhere
- Thanks But No Thanks (EP)
- My Life (EP)
- Day After Day (EP)
- Get Up Get Out (EP)
- Livin' a Lie (EP)
- Devil In Disguise (2006 demo)
- Livin' It Up (2006 demo)
- Scream Out Loud (2006 demo)
- Stand Up (2006)
- U4U (I'd Like to Thank You)
- Needs
- Would You Care
- Understand
- Padlock Box
- So Smooth
- Right Track
- Let's Get Together

== History ==
Days Awake appeared at The Saint in Asbury Park for two well attended reunion shows on 4 November 2008 and 6 April 2009. Days Awake also reunited for a night on stage at the House Of Independents on 30 September 2016. The 13 song setlist brought the band out of retirement after nearly 7.5 years.

== Lollapalooza's Last Band Standing ==
In the Summer of 2006, Days Awake was selected among hundreds of amateur bands by Perry Farrell as one of America's best 20 live performers. However, the band withdrew honorably from the contest in the final week of preliminary voting, citing apparent unfair voting practices via internet bots as being contrary to the spirit of the contest.

== The Rick Barry Era ==
From November 2006 through April 2007, core members of the Days Awake band performed a number of special appearances in Asbury Park and New York City together with lead vocalist Rick Barry.

== Days Awake and Lance Larson: Building a Bridge ==
Members of Days Awake performed multiple shows with Lance Larson in 2006 and 2007. They were involved in the recording of his album, Song for a Soldier, which was released in 2007.

== Lineup ==
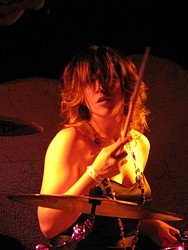
Sarah Tomek performing at the Asbury Park Music Awards at the Stone Pony during the November 2007 Ceremony

- Chuck Schoonmaker - - lead vocals, guitar, keyboards
- Jay Cagna - bass guitar
- Sarah Tomek - drums, percussion, backing vocals
- Jeremy Korpas - lead guitar, backing vocals
- Eric Safka - keyboards
- Dominic Lacquaniti - rhythm guitar, backing vocals, Lead Vocals on "Alright now"

=== Auxiliary members ===
- Rick Barry (musician) - (2006–2007) - lead vocals, guitar
- Lance Larson (musician) - vocals, guitar
- Dave Ferraro - (2006) - bass
- Darren Lambeth - saxophone
- James Dalton (musician) - harmonica, mouth harp
- G2

== Official music videos ==
1. "Day After Day"
