= Jeff Raspe =

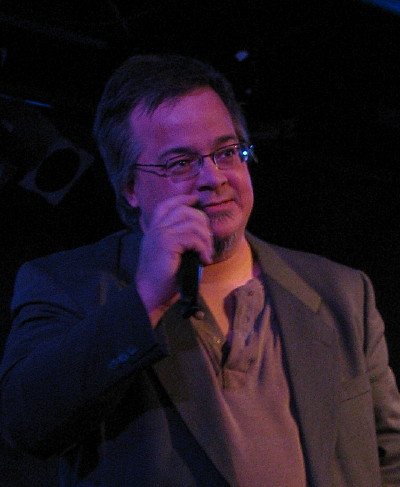
- WBJB Music Director Jeff Raspe hosting the Asbury Park Music Awards in 2012.
- Born: 1966 (age 59–60); U.S.
- Education: B.A., Communications, Hofstra University, 1988
- Occupations: Radio personality, Music Director at WBJB 90.5 The Night, Brookdale Public Radio in Lincroft, New Jersey.

Jeff Raspe is Music Director at NPR-affiliated, non-commercial, triple-A station WBJB-FM in Lincroft, New Jersey. WBJB-FM, Brookdale Public Radio, is also known as 90.5 The Night. Jeff Raspe, who began his career in radio on Halloween in 1988, is an avid music enthusiast who has received the Asbury Park Music Award for Top Radio Personality several years running.

== WHTG-FM ==
Prior to joining the WBJB staff, he was a DJ at modern rock radio station WHTG-FM, 106.3 FM, from October 1988 until March 2001. While there he hosted the new music radio show called "The Underground". In March 2001, the station was purchased by Press Communications, and he moved to WBJB.

== WBJB-FM ==
Raspe currently hosts two radio shows at WBJB, "Afternoons With Jeff" on weekday afternoons from 3:00 to 7:00 pm, and "Fresh Tracks", a new music show, at 11:00 pm on Tuesday. They can be heard over the radio in central New Jersey or at www.wbjb.org online. In the course of his time at WBJB, Raspe has interviewed such notable acts as Matthew Sweet, Jim Keller, The Saw Doctors, Rich Robinson, and Cowboy Junkies, among others.

== Absolute A Go Go Records and Miracle Management ==
Raspe also worked for independent record label, "Absolute A Go Go Records" whose artists have included Phish, The Vestrymen, Tiny Lights, The Figgs, and Black Sun Ensemble and "Miracle Management", whose artists include Miracle Legion, Shelleyan Orphan, and The Figgs.

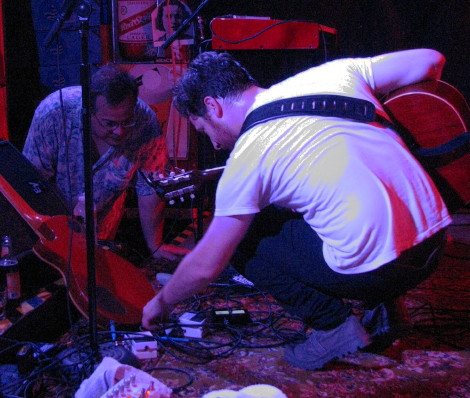
DJ Jeff Raspe helping Alex Dezen of The Damnwells with a technical problem at The Saint, September 2011

== Main Man Records ==
Raspe also coordinated and served as executive producer on a tribute album for the New Jersey band Winter Hours for Main Man Records called "A Few Uneven Rhymes" in 2008. Artists on the recording included Gordon Gano (Violent Femmes), The Ryan Brothers, (The Bogmen), Matthew Caws (Nada Surf), and several members of The Feelies. In 2011, Raspe was a co-producer on another Main Man Records project; a tribute to the band The Runaways called, "Take It Or Leave It: A Tribute To The Queens of Noise, The Runaways". The album, while controversial, was critically lauded and featured performances by artists such as The Donnas, The Dandy Warhols and original Runaways singer Cherie Currie.

== Personal life ==
Raspe is known to friends and fans as "Unkajeff". When not in the studio, he frequents local live music venues on the New Jersey Shore. Raspe has been quoted as saying "In other musical communities, you're lucky to have four or five good bands come out of it every few years. In Asbury, you'll have four or five good bands to see on a Tuesday." Raspe has served as the host of the Asbury Park Music Awards at The Stone Pony for several years, and has hosted shows co-sponsored by WBJB and The Saint in Asbury Park, NJ.

== Volunteer work ==
Raspe has served as volunteer emcee for the annual Light of Day shows to benefit Parkinson's disease. He has also served on the awards committee for the Jersey Acoustic Music Awards.
