= Jay's =

Jay's may refer to

- Jays Foods, snack food manufacturer
- Jay's Ltd., mourning warehouse
- Mrs. Jay's, restaurant
