= Wave Gathering =

Defunct annual music festival in New Jersey, US

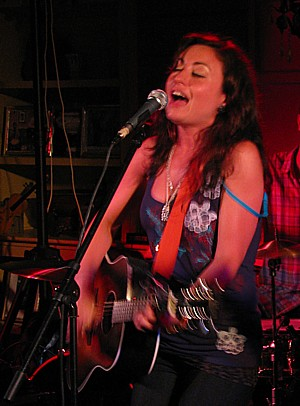
- Mieka Pauley performs at the 2009 Wave Gathering
- Genre: alternative, blues, folk, indie, electronic, rock, and other music genres; other performing arts as well
- Dates: Summer, specific dates vary
- Location: Asbury Park, New Jersey
- Years active: 2006–present
- Founders: Adam Weisberg, Scott Stamper, Gordon Brown, Larry Katz.

The Wave Gathering Music Festival was co-founded by Adam Weisberg, Scott Stamper, Gordon Brown, and Larry Katz. It was held in Asbury Park, New Jersey, USA. It was an annual American music festival modeled after South by Southwest and Austin City Limits Music Festival that was held across the entire town, spanning several days. During this time, cafes, restaurants, parks, shops, the boardwalk, nightclubs, and local vendors offer local and regional music, art, and food to the crowds. The Wave Gathering included approximately 16 stages on which approximately 150-160 local, regional, and national music acts play alternative, blues, folk, indie, electronic, rock, and other genres of music. Other performing arts were represented as well.

== See also ==
- Asbury Park Music Awards
- The Saint (music venue)
- North to Shore Festival
- Sea.Hear.Now
