= Raspe =

Raspe is a surname. Notable people with the surname include:

- Henry Raspe (1204–1247), Landgrave of Thuringia
- Jan-Carl Raspe (1944–1977), German urban guerilla
- Jeff Raspe (born 1966), American radio personality
- Rudolf Erich Raspe (1736–1794), German writer
