= Scott Stamper =

American businessman (born 1962)

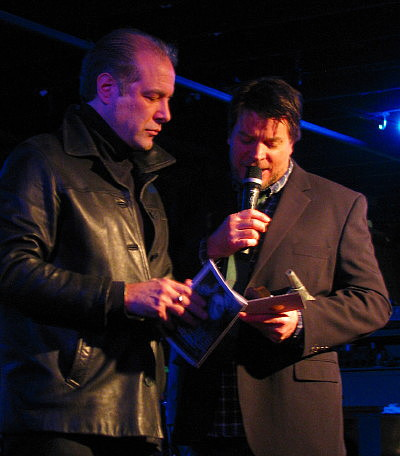
- Scott Stamper (on right) announcing awards at the 2012 Asbury Music Awards ceremony.
- Born: March 10, 1962
- Known for: Owner of The Saint (music venue) and the T-Bird Cafe; founder of the Asbury Music Awards and the Wave Gathering

Scott Stamper (born March 10, 1962) is an American club owner, booking agent, and talent scout. He was the owner of The Saint in Asbury Park, NJ and founder of the Golden T-Bird Awards, currently known as The Asbury Music Awards. Stamper also founded the Wave Gathering.

== Early years ==
Stamper grew up in Kearny, New Jersey. He attended Rutgers University in New Brunswick, New Jersey, where he worked as a DJ at the college's radio station, WRSU 88.7 FM Rutgers Radio. During that time, Stamper helped to raise funds to support the station. He also chose new artists to be played on the air, and worked with the staff and musicians to present benefit concerts on College Avenue in New Brunswick.

== T-Bird Cafe ==
Stamper later moved south to Belmar, New Jersey. Beginning in 1991, Stamper managed a small bar on Main Street in Asbury Park called T-Bird Cafe. Stamper started out booking shows for weekends, but within six month was booking five to seven shows a week. Many new bands found a home at T-Birds Cafe. When it closed after a few years, the family of artists moved down to the next corner on Main Street and played at the new club opened by Stamper and Adam Jon Weisberg, called The Saint.

== The Golden T-Bird Awards ==
In 1993, Stamper and Pete Mantas founded The Golden T-Bird Awards, to recognize the talent of musicians in the region. The awards were named after the T-Bird Cafe where the ceremony was first held. In 1995, the awards ceremony was moved to The Saint and was renamed "The Asbury Park Music Awards".

== The Saint ==
In November 1994 Stamper and Adam Jon Weisberg opened The Saint, another music venue located on the corner of Main Street and Monroe Avenue in Asbury Park, New Jersey. The Saint has been described by music critics as one of the top five rock clubs in New Jersey. Like The Cellar Door in Washington, DC, CB's 313 Gallery (next to the now defunct CBGB), and The Living Room in New York City, it offers live, original music, and serves as a recording studio for live concerts. Pallagrosi, former owner of the Starland Ballroom, and co-founder of Concerts East says that "the sound in The Saint is now awesome for a small venue." Stamper has been credited with helping to keep the local music scene alive through The Saint when newspapers were reporting that the heyday of live music was over, and even The Stone Pony was struggling to stay open. The Saint has been described as the bedrock of the Asbury Park music scene, and an important venue for introducing emerging artists. The Saint showcases a variety of new and well-known, local, national, and international acts that are touring through the region. The Saint has featured many famous musicians over the years. It was a starting point for the careers of such bands as Airborne Toxic Event, Nicole Atkins, Ben Folds Five, Cake, Creed, Hoobastank, Incubus, Jewel, Kings of Leon, The Ghost of a Saber Tooth Tiger, Kenny Wayne Shepherd, Tegan and Sara, and The The. The Saint closed its doors on November 18, 2022 after losing its liquor license.

== The Asbury Music Awards ==
In order to recognize the many talented musicians and others associated with the local and regional music scene, Stamper, and Pete Mantas founded the annual Asbury Park Music Awards (also called the Asbury Music Awards) in 1993.

The first award ceremony was held at the T-Bird Cafe, and the awards were originally titled "The Golden T-Bird Awards." When the awards ceremony was moved to The Saint in 1995, the honors were renamed "The Asbury Park Music Awards". Shortly thereafter the event's attendance exceeded The Saint's capacity, and the ceremony was then rotated among larger venues, including The Fastlane, The Tradewinds, and The Stone Pony. In recent years, the ceremony has been held at The Stone Pony. The awards ceremony's format is similar to that of the Grammy Awards. The presentation of the awards is interspersed with performances of live, original music and poetry.

== Suckdog Performances ==
Stamper promoted the Kentucky leg of Lisa Suckdog's 1998 tour. At their first show, Stamper allegedly threw a dead chicken on stage. He later refused to pay the band for their final performance, citing a previous show where the band didn't perform. The band insisted that Stamper had been unable to get the sound system working.

== The Wave Gathering ==
Stamper also co-founded The Wave Gathering Music Festival, an annual American music festival modeled after South by Southwest and Austin City Limits Music Festival that is held across the entire town of Asbury Park, NJ, spanning several days. During this time, cafes, restaurants, parks, shops, the boardwalk, nightclubs, and local vendors offer local and regional music, art, and food to the crowds.

The Wave Gathering includes approximately 16 stages on which approximately 150-160 local, regional, and national music acts play alternative, blues, folk, indie, electronic, rock, and other genres of music.

== See also ==
- Asbury Music Awards
- The Saint
- Wave Gathering
