= Appel Farm Arts & Music Center =

Regional arts center in New Jersey

Coordinates: 39.580141°N 75.199742°W

Appel Farm Arts & Music Center, located near Elmer, New Jersey, United States, was a multifaceted nonprofit regional arts center founded by musicians and art educators Albert and Clare Rostan Appel. Appel Farm Arts & Music Center was South Jersey's leading Arts Education organization. The center was founded in 1960 as a summer camp, became incorporated in 1978 and later expanded its programming to include on-site arts retreats, arts classes, outreach in the schools, professional development for teachers, and the South Jersey Arts Fest.

It announced its closure on 19th November 2026.

== History ==
The Arts and Music Center began in 1959 when musicians and arts educators Clare, a German-born refugee and her husband, New Jersey farmer Albert Appel, decided to turn their 176-acre (0.71 km^{2}) former farm into a day camp, merging their love for their children and their friends with their interest in music. The first group of campers arrived in the summer of 1960.

Over the years, as participation grew, a series of small wooden cabins were constructed in an area around the Appel home. Albert, a violinist, invited guest artists to perform and to instruct the children. Gradually, these activities expanded and full-time professional staff, as well as seasonal instructors, were hired and the camp became a residential program. The original camp bunks were converted chicken coops, and art instruction was held in a barn.

Appel Farm was incorporated as a 501(c)(3) non-profit organization in 1978 and, in 1987, Mark Packer, then Camp Director, became Appel Farm's Executive Director. Albert Appel officially became Director Emeritus but still actively participated in the organization's operations. An annual arts and music festival was introduced in 1989. While Clare Appel died in 1990, the legacy she and her husband founded continued to grow and diversify. Albert Appel died in 2020. In 2014, Cori Solomon was promoted to Executive Director after a year of interim directors that included Loren Thomas and Larry Schmidt. Ms. Solomon's vision to bring the organization back to its original roots as being an Arts Education organization came to fruition when the New Jersey State Council on the Arts reclassified the center as an "Arts Basic to Education" classification in their grant funding. With this status, Appel Farm has developed more partnerships with arts organizations, educational institutions, social service organizations and school systems. On-site arts education programming has since flourished to include multiple arts retreats for mothers/daughters, families and Girl Scouts. Annually, Appel Farm's programs serve a combined audience of approximately 25,000 people, including schoolchildren. It receives funding from a variety of public and private sources, including the New Jersey State Council on the Arts, Geraldine R. Dodge Foundation, New Jersey Cultural Trust, Salem Health & Wellness, Giving Opportunities to Others (GOTO), and individuals, among others. The landscape of the former farm has evolved as well with improved structures and facilities to accommodate the growth in programming.

Today, Appel Farm's facilities include the 250-seat Clare Rostan Appel Theatre; a 7,000-square-foot (650 m^{2}) Fine Arts Building with studios and gallery space; modern bunkhouses that serve as residential accommodations for conference and summer camp participants; classrooms; a dance studio; a dining hall; two outdoor stages; a swimming pool; practice rooms; photography darkrooms and video studios, and the main administration building. Appel Farm is also home to a wood-fired anagama/noborigama kiln, which was built in partnership with the Perkins Center for the Arts in 2000. Recently, the Center acquired additional land through New Jersey's Green Acres program, which enables this land to be preserved in perpetuity.

== Summer Arts Camp ==
The oldest of Appel Farm's programs, the residential Summer Arts Camp provides intensive arts education for children ages 7–17 in an educational and stimulating environment. In accordance with the Appels' belief that all children have innate artistic talent, admission to the Summer Arts Camp Program is based on interest rather than skill level.

Alumni of the Center’s Summer Arts Camp include designer Jonathan Adler; violist Toby Appel, soprano Amy Burton; film producer Marie Cantin; composer Michael Kaulkin; Broadway musical director Stephen Oremus; actor Connor Paolo; film executive and producer Karen Rosenfelt; multi-media designer Abigail Rudner; songwriter, performer and record producer Adam Schlesinger; musician Rami Perlman, son of renowned violinist Itzhak Perlman; actress Genevieve Angelson; singer/songwriter Bethany Yarrow, daughter of folksinger Peter Yarrow; Jewish leader Steven R Schimmel, actor William Youmans; musician Steve Berlin from Los Lobos, composer Chris DeBlasio, Broadway and television actor Daniel Jenkins, and Brett Loewenstern from American Idol.

== Concerts ==
For many years, the Center's Concert/Presenting Series offered year-round performances by artists from a variety of musical genres. In 2005, Appel Farm performances were expanded to include First Fridays @ the Gallery that featured emerging performers in an intimate, coffeehouse-type setting. Appel Farm, working in cooperation with Washington Township Live Arts, also held concerts and presentations at the 2,500-seat Commerce Bank Arts Center, located in Sewell, New Jersey. Past performers included Lonestar, Dave Koz, Sweet Honey in the Rock and the Russian folk dance group, the Moiseyev Dance Company.

The reach of Appel Farm's signature concert event, the annual Appel Farm Arts and Music Festival, extended beyond New Jersey, attracting audiences of upwards of 10,000 from the Eastern seaboard and beyond. Since its premiere in 1989, the Festival, held on the first Saturday of June, drew music enthusiasts from throughout the Northeastern corridor of the United States, and from as far away as Texas and California. The family-oriented, daylong event offered a lineup of as many as twelve musicians and musical groups, including both recognized as well as emerging artists, performing on two outdoor stages. The Festival also incorporated a Children's Village featuring children's theatre performances and arts activities and a juried Crafts Fair, which included exhibitions and demonstrations of artwork in an array of media.

After two years on hiatus, in 2015, Appel Farm launched its first-ever Music & Wine Festival, held on October 3, 2015.

The center has realigned its festival to focus further on its arts education mission for June 2018.

== Community Arts Programs ==
Appel Farm's Community Arts Outreach Programs, developed to meet the needs of residents of New Jersey's southwestern counties, continue to grow in size and scope as the needs and expectations of those communities change. Through the Public School Arts Education Programs, Appel Farm partners with elementary and middle schools in inner cities and underserved rural areas of southern New Jersey including Salem, Cumberland, Gloucester and Camden counties. The School Programs consist of Theater in the Schools, Music in the Schools, Visual Arts in the Schools, Dance in the Schools, and Student Theater and Dance Matinées. High School Programs include visual arts and music residencies and professional theatre performances. Over 20,000 schoolchildren are served by these programs annually. The Family Matinée Series presents a variety of children's performers at the Center's on-site theatre, and arts classes at Appel Farm offer instruction in a spectrum of arts media. These on-site programs draw audiences and participants predominately from within a 25-mile (40 km) radius.
