= Oxford Circus panic =

2017 human stampede in London

Coordinates: 51.515°N 0.141°W

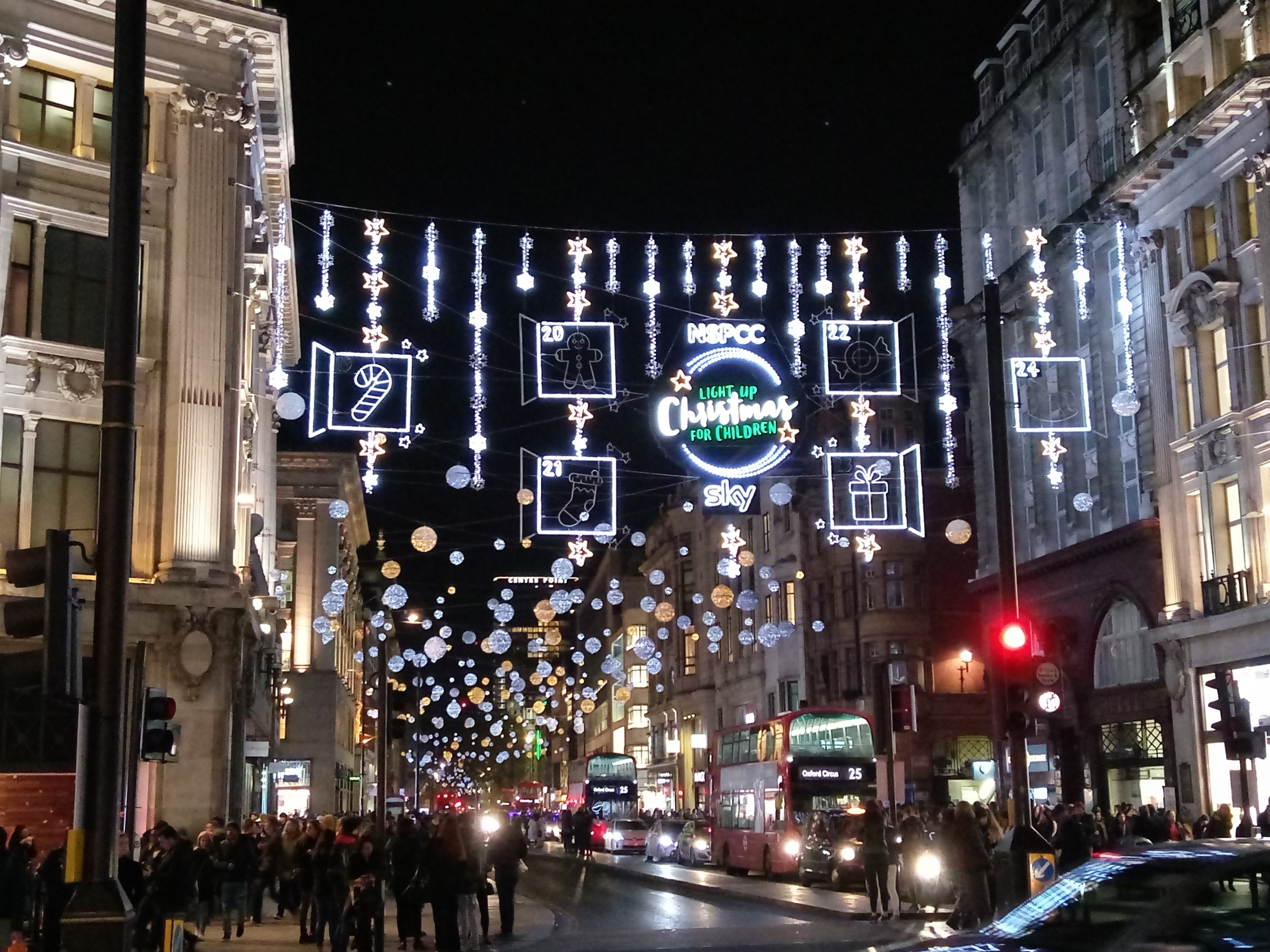
- Oxford Circus as seen one week before the incident
- Date: 24 November 2017
- Time: 16:38 GMT
- Location: Oxford Circus, London, United Kingdom
- Injuries: 16

The Oxford Circus panic, or Oxford Street panic, was a stampede in Oxford Circus tube station and surrounding streets in London, United Kingdom, around 16:38 GMT on Friday 24 November 2017 in which 16 people were injured.

The incident began with false reports of gunshots after a fight between two people on the Central line platform at Oxford Circus station. Since the panic coincided with Black Friday sales and the Christmas shopping season, the streets of Oxford Street and Regent Street were full of shoppers. Many shops barricaded their doors, and the police issued warnings for people in Oxford Street to seek shelter immediately.

In the resulting panic, several people were injured by falls and trampling, nine seriously enough to require hospital treatment. By 18:05 GMT, the police had declared that there had been no gunshots or terrorism, which ended the incident.

== Background ==
London had seen several terrorist attacks in 2017, including vehicle ramming attacks on Westminster Bridge in March and London Bridge in June and an attempted train bombing in September. The terror threat level was "severe" meaning an attack was considered highly likely.

Oxford Street and Regent Street are two of the UK's busiest shopping streets, and the incident occurred on one of the busiest shopping days of the year.

Ten days before the incident, a window cleaner had been injured in a fall from a building on Oxford Street onto a lorry parked beneath it. A Twitter post about the accident describing a lorry surrounded by blood stains would later be taken out of context during the panic as evidence of a non-existent vehicle attack.

== Incident ==
At 16:38 GMT, there was an altercation between two men on the westbound Central line platform at Oxford Circus station, with some witnesses reporting hearing bangs. People began to flee the station from an exit at the junction between Oxford Street and Regent Street. Seeing the rush, others on the street, including passengers on passing buses, began to panic and ran away through the streets and into nearby shops and restaurants. In the resulting stampede, 16 people were injured, including eight people who needed hospital treatment for minor injuries and one who suffered serious leg trauma.

Metropolitan Police, British Transport Police and City of London Police all deployed armed officers to the scene and closed Oxford Circus station as well as nearby Bond Street station. London Fire Brigade sent several fire engines in response to the incident. In a tweet, Metropolitan Police told those in buildings to stay inside and those on Oxford Street to seek shelter. Police went from building to building to search for shooters. At 18:05 GMT, the British Transport Police declared that there was no evidence of any gun shots and ended the state of emergency, but extra officers remained on the scene to reassure those caught up in the incident.

=== Media reporting and mass panic ===
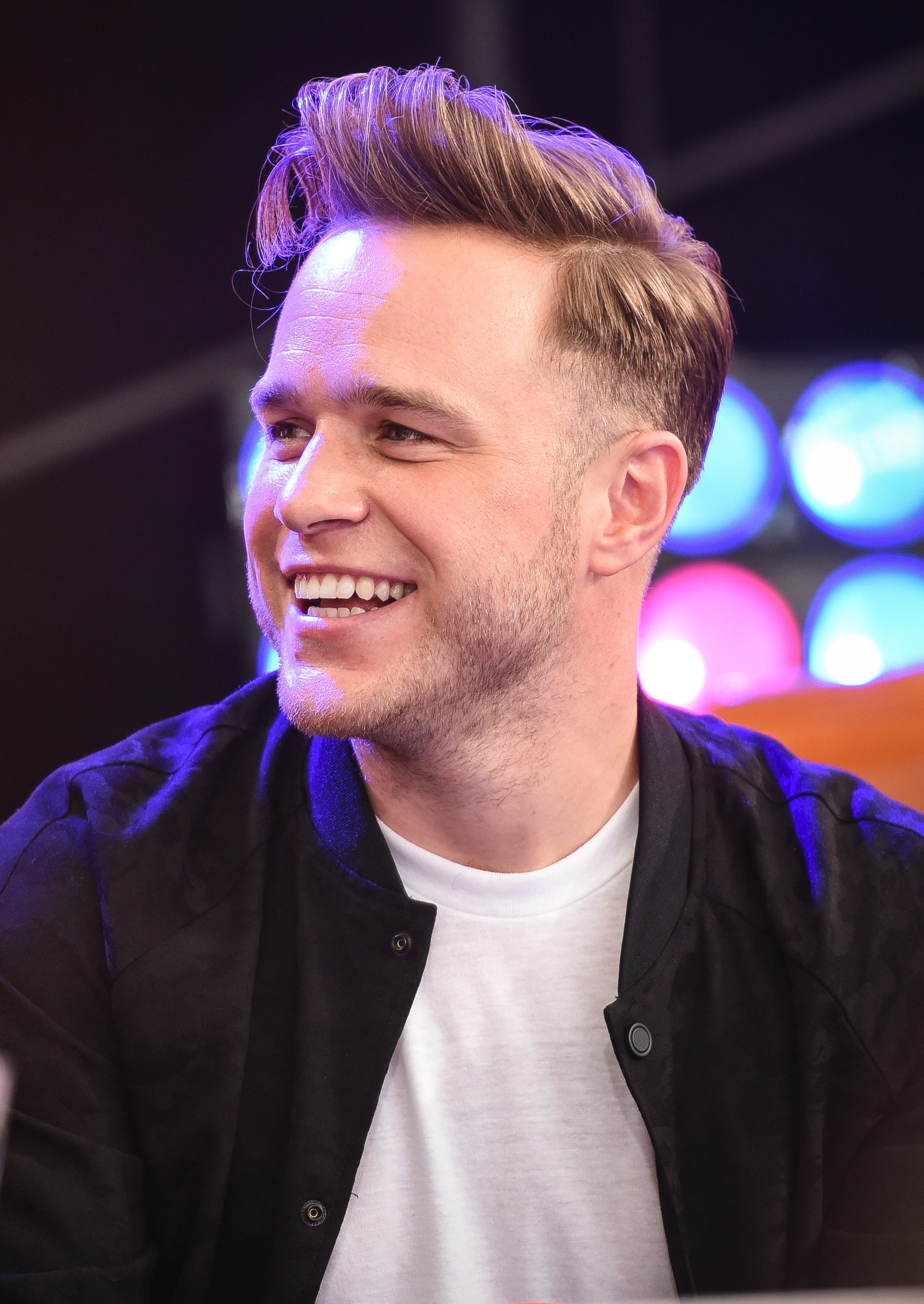
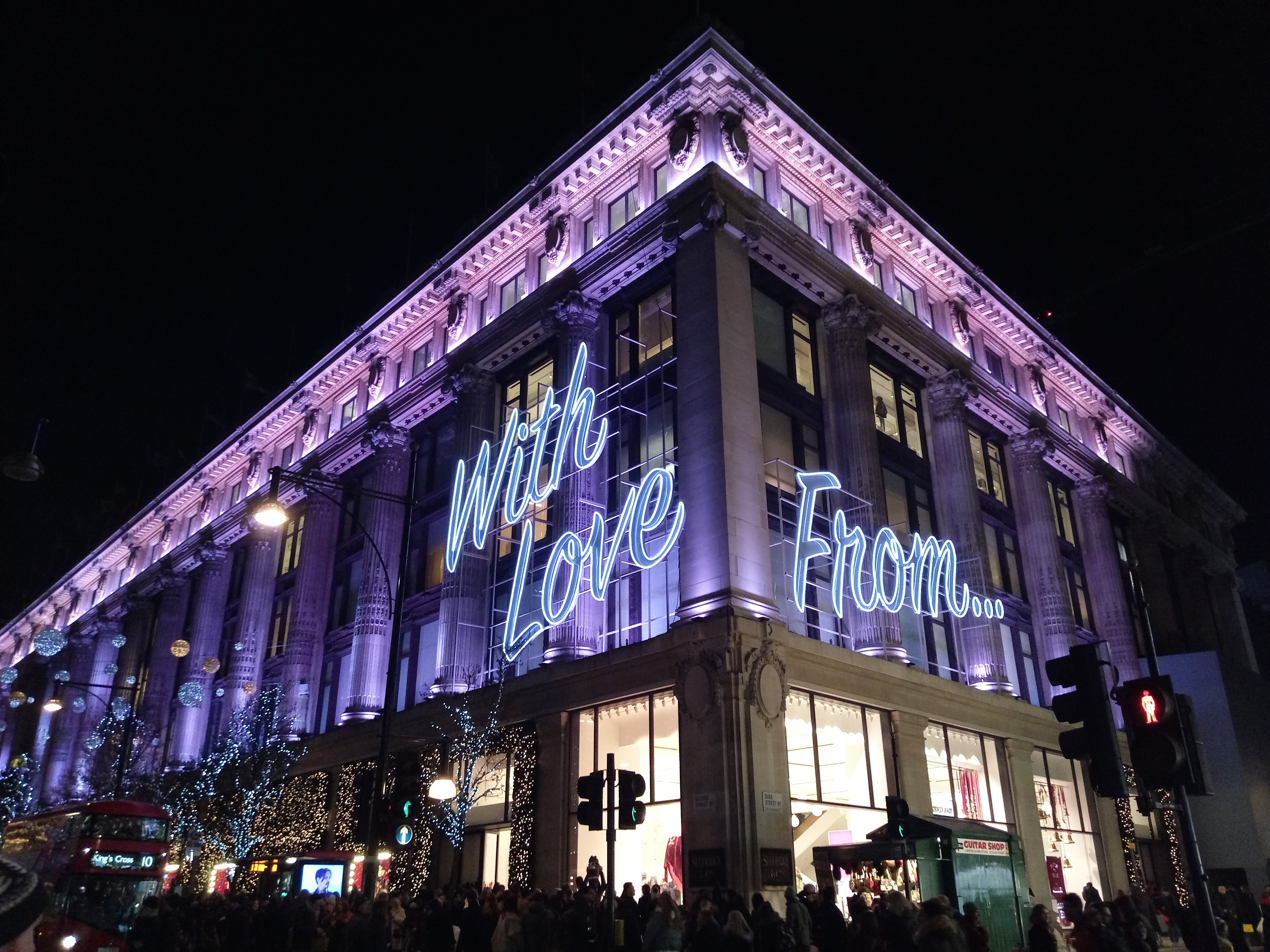
The pop star Olly Murs (left) was blamed for worsening the panic after spreading the false rumour that there was gunfire inside Selfridges department store (right).

After the first reports of apparent gunfire in Oxford Circus, news about an apparent terrorist attack spread rapidly, fuelled by both news media stories and social media postings. These posts are believed to have worsened the panic and caused it to spread further around the Oxford Circus area.

The pop star Olly Murs, who had been in Selfridges Oxford Street store at the time, was particularly criticised for tweeting to 7.8 million followers "Fuck everyone get out of Selfridges now gun shots!! I'm inside." Despite not hearing any gunfire or seeing any evidence of a terrorist attack, Murs continued to claim for months after the incident that there had been a shooting in Selfridges.

== Aftermath ==
The British Transport Police issued CCTV footage of two people wanted for questioning for the initial altercation. Two men aged 21 and 40 handed themselves in to police the next day. They were released without charge, with the Metropolitan Police declaring that they were not searching for any further suspects.

The incident has become a case study of mass delusions, the spread of misinformation on social media, and the need for clear information during serious incidents.
