= Peace, Love & Misunderstanding =

- Theatrical release poster
- Directed by: Bruce Beresford
- Written by: Christina Mengert; Joseph Muszynski
- Produced by: Brice Dal Farra; Claude Dal Farra; Lauren Munsch; Jonathan Burkhart
- Starring: Jane Fonda; Catherine Keener; Jeffrey Dean Morgan; Chace Crawford; Elizabeth Olsen
- Cinematography: Andre Fleuren
- Edited by: John David Allen
- Music by: Spencer David Hutchings
- Production company: BCDF Pictures
- Distributed by: IFC Films
- Release dates: September 13, 2011 (TIFF); June 8, 2012 (United States)
- Running time: 92 minutes
- Country: United States
- Language: English
- Box office: $542,762

Peace, Love & Misunderstanding is a 2011 American comedy-drama film directed by Bruce Beresford and starring Jane Fonda, Catherine Keener, Jeffrey Dean Morgan, Elizabeth Olsen, Nat Wolff, Chace Crawford, Kyle MacLachlan, and Rosanna Arquette. It was filmed in the town of Woodstock, New York, the same town in which the film is set.

Manhattan lawyer Diane and her teens head north to Woodstock to her estranged hippie mother after her husband demands a divorce, where they all change their life perspectives: poetry-reading Zoe becomes interested in the sensitive young butcher Cole, nerdy Jake works on his first film project, and Diane connects with carpenter/singer Jude, while ending the decades-long war with her mother Grace.

The film had a gala premiere at the Toronto International Film Festival on September 13, 2011. It was released to theaters on June 8, 2012, starting in limited release. It was released on DVD and Blu-ray Disc on October 2, 2012.

== Plot ==
Manhattan lawyer Diane Hudson's husband Mark demands a divorce, just before their dinner party with friends begins. Devastated, she sits silently through the evening. Later, Diane announces she and their teens Zoe and Jake are heading to Woodstock to stay with her estranged hippie mother.

Driving to the village in silence, Diane breaks the news upon arriving at Grace's. Her daughter Zoe is shocked, as she has been away at Columbia. However, Jake expresses relief because he has witnessed their parents' fights.

Entering the Bohemian home, with chickens wandering freely inside, they pass through a bead curtain, finding Grace at her pottery wheel. The eternal hippie dreamed about their coming. Not having seen each other for 20 years, the stiff Diane lets her mother hug her.

Inside, both Zoe and Jake ask questions, but he does while filming. It soon becomes evident that Diane is politically conservative, while Grace is the complete opposite. Although Diane has not revealed why she broke their 20-year silence, Grace is grateful. Diane requests her mother refrain from her usual activities, specifically with men. Grace promises to try.

On Saturday, the four head downtown, where Grace participates in a weekly anti-war protest. At first opportunity, Diane extracts herself and the kids from the demonstration to shop, entering a butcher's, which appalls Zoe, a vegetarian. The young butcher Cole is both organic and conscientious.

Grace invites the protesters over on Sunday. There, Diane meets Jude Fisher, Jake notices fellow teen Lucy and Zoe talks with Cole, who normally participates in the protest but had to work. As the film progresses, each of the Hudsons become connected with these Woodstock residents.

Zoe initially sees Cole as vastly different from herself. Uncomfortable he is a butcher, she believes he lacks compassion. However, their mutual admiration of several writers helps Zoe warm to him. They kiss, and eventually are intimate. However, Zoe is shocked when Cole hits a deer with his truck and has to shoot it dead. She barely acknowledges him when he drops her at Grace’s.

Diane and Jude take awhile to sync. Initially rebuffed, after taking her to a remote lake where he skinny dips, she jumps in with him. Diane tells Jude her kids convinced her to stay longer.

Performing onstage in Woodstock’s town center, Jude convinces Diane to sing a duet, which he finishes with a passionate kiss. Both of her children are surprised, but Zoe gets upset and leaves, so Cole follows. After she explains her parents are not divorced yet, he defends Diane. Zoe is mad he does not side with her.

When Zoe returns home, she refuses to listen to Diane, blaming her mother for the divorce. The next day, Grace tells her she was cruel to Diane the night before. One day Zoe will understand that sometimes things need to change and transform.

Diane goes to Jude's. He shows her some of his woodworking projects. They later give in to their mutual attraction, making love in his living room.

That night, Grace and Woodstock womenfolk celebrate a full moon circle, playing drums and chanting around a bonfire, occasionally howling at the moon. Diane at first does not participate, while Zoe does. Later, the daughter apologizes for being harsh the previous night, as she realizes she must accept her mother needs to move on.

The group plays "True or False" with tequila. Some tell mostly true, outrageous stories. When they insist Diana try, she does, but is terrible at lying. After Zoe leaves with Cole, a drunk Diane continues. She tells them the skinny-dipping story, then sleeping with him the next morning. Nobody believes it is true, so she names Jude, who she then discovers had previously slept with Grace.

Diane confronts Jude and her mother about their sleeping together. They explain it happened a long time ago, when Grace was grieving her husband's abandonment and mother's death, so Jude tried to help her cope.

Diane drives the children back to NYC in the morning, blaming Grace's egocentrism. Grace had sold marijuana at Diane’s wedding reception. Furious, Diane had called the police.

Back in New York, Diane's divorce is finalized. Jake stays in touch with Lucy while working on his film "Love in Woodstock". Accepted into the New York Youth Film Festival, everyone comes to see it. As it heals any bad feelings, a short time later, the Hudsons move to Grace’s in Woodstock.

== Cast ==
- Jane Fonda as Grace
- Catherine Keener as Diane
- Jeffrey Dean Morgan as Jude
- Elizabeth Olsen as Zoe
- Chace Crawford as Cole
- Nat Wolff as Jake
- Kyle MacLachlan as Mark
- Rosanna Arquette as Darcy
- Marissa O'Donnell as Tara
- Joyce Van Patten as Mariam
- Katharine McPhee as Sara

== Reception ==
Peace, Love & Misunderstanding received negative reviews from critics. As of June 2020, the film holds a 30% approval rating on Rotten Tomatoes, based on 70 reviews with an average rating of 4.7 out of 10. The website's critics consensus reads: "Peace, Love, & Misunderstanding produces many unintentional laughs with its absurdly contrived plot and cheery insistence that everything is just super".

== Soundtrack ==
A soundtrack has not been released for purchase.

1. "Being On Our Own", performed by Fruit Bats
2. "Scarborough Fair", performed by Jane Fonda
3. "Scarlet Begonias", performed by The Grateful Dead
4. "Loose Lucy", performed by The Grateful Dead
5. "Cactus Flower Rag", performed by Harper Simon
6. "False Hearted Lover Blues", performed by Levon Helm
7. "You're Not The First", performed by Gary Knox and the Streethearts
8. "The Shine", performed by Harper Simon
9. "Everyday", performed by Vetiver
10. "Stella Blue", performed by The Grateful Dead
11. "The Weight", performed by Jeffrey Dean Morgan and Catherine Keener
12. "Seems Like Yesterday", performed by Katharine McPhee
13. "Didj On The Mothership", performed by Sympatico Rhythm Unit
14. "Changing Colours", performed by Great Lake Swimmers
15. "What's Been Going On", performed by Amos Lee
16. "Hold On", performed by Angus & Julia Stone
17. "None The Wiser", performed by Dorie Colangelo
18. "The Devil's Got My Secret", performed by Mieka Pauley
19. "Peace Love and Understanding", performed by The Gaylads
20. "What'll We Do 'Till Dawn", performed by Jeffrey Dean Morgan
21. "Piano Sonata 22 in F", performed by Blair McMullen
22. "Tema con Variazioni", performed by Blair McMullen
