= Mourning warehouse =

Funeral related merchant

A mourning warehouse or maison de deuil was a shop which sold goods for funerals and the elaborate mourning of the Victorian era. These included dark clothing and fabric which might be required for years of wear after a death. These establishments could also provide large items such as coffins, a hearse and appropriate horses to draw it.

Large mourning warehouses were established in many American and European cities during the 19th century. In London, these included Peter Robinson's Family and General Mourning Warehouse in Oxford Street and The London General Mourning Warehouse, established by W. C. Jay in Regent Street in 1841. In Paris, the Grande Maison de Noir was established in the Rue du Faubourg Saint-Honoré.

In the 20th century, the fashion for elaborate funerals and mourning declined. The surviving establishments, such as Hanningtons of Brighton, tended to diversify by becoming more general department stores.
