= Appel Farm Arts and Music Festival =

Coordinates: 39.580144°N 75.199743°W

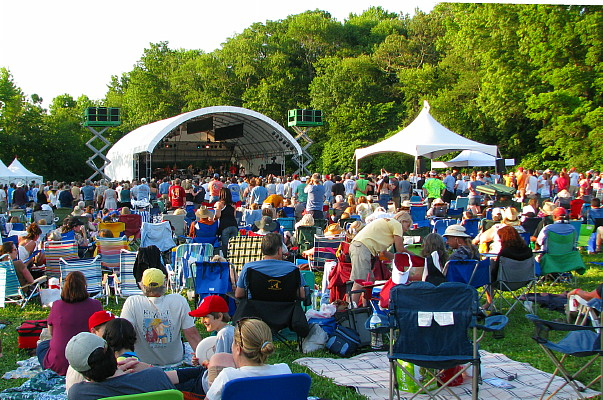
- Picture of one of two concert stages at the 2012 Appel Farm Arts and Music Festival.
- Genre: acoustic rock, alternative rock, blues, folk, indie, rock
- Dates: The festival was usually held in June
- Location: Elmer, New Jersey
- Years active: 1989-2012
- Founders: Appel Farm’s Executive Director, Mark Packer, and Sean Timmons, Artistic Director
- Website: www.appelfarm.org

The Appel Farm Arts and Music Festival was an annual one-day festival held the first Saturday in June at Appel Farm Arts and Music Center located near Elmer, in Salem County, New Jersey, United States. Appel Farm's signature concert event featured a juried crafts fair, a Children's Village with games and activities, and beer and wine tents. The festival's draw extended beyond New Jersey, attracting audiences of up to 10,000 from the entire mid-Atlantic region and beyond.

== History ==
In 1988, Appel Farm's Executive Director, Mark Packer, and Sean Timmons, Artistic Director, conceived of a one-day musical event to present acclaimed performers to audiences in a rural corner of New Jersey and to celebrate the 30 year anniversary of the Appel Farm Arts Camp. Both were familiar with other festivals but wanted their endeavor to have its own identity. Ultimately, they created a signature event celebrating the craft of the songwriter and showcasing high quality craft artists and children's activities.

“We focus on great songwriting,” said Timmons in a 2006 interview. “That’s really the thrust of what we’re about. They could be folk, country, rock, Latin, hip-hop, anything – we never feel our hands are tied.”

The first festival, held on May 13, 1989, at a 176-acre (0.71 km^{2}) site that was formerly a farm, set a precedent, presenting recognized artists alongside local and lesser-known performers. Singer/songwriters Don McLean, Tom Rush, and Livingston Taylor were headliners while The Taproom Band, Elaine Silver, the Pinelands Dulcimer Society and Shirley Keller provided a more regional flavor. Approximately 800 people attended that first festival, which grew to draw crowds of upwards of 10,000 while remaining true to the spirit of its founding principles. Over time, the Festival earned a reputation as the “Woodstock of South Jersey” for its eclectic variety of musicians and its rural setting.

The Festival was held on the first Saturday of June since 1990, drawing music enthusiasts from throughout the Northeastern corridor of the United States, and from as far away as Texas and California. The family oriented, daylong event offered a lineup of as many as twelve musicians and musical groups, including both recognized as well as emerging artists, performing on two outdoor stages. The Festival also incorporated a Children's Village featuring children's theater performances and arts activities and a juried Crafts Fair, which included exhibitions and demonstrations of artwork in an array of media by over 50 artists.

Artist Greg Nemec designed the iconic festival posters for the first twenty years.

Over its history, the event received several honors and awards, including two Governor's Awards for Tourism (2008 and 2004) and Philadelphia Magazine's “Best of Philly” Award in the category of Folk Festival in 1992. Appel Farm was voted “Best Performance Venue” in South Jersey Magazine's 2007 “Best of the Best” Awards. The Festival's Craft Fair was given a four-star (excellent) rating by the Montclair Craft Guild.

The Festival took a one-year hiatus in 2009 and roared back with a one-stage event featuring The Avett Brothers, Sharon Jones & The Dap-Kings, Enter The Haggis and more in 2010. In 2011, a full line up on two stages featured an eclectic line up including Gogol Bordello (acoustic), Josh Ritter & The Royal City Band, Ani DiFranco, Trombone Shorty & Orleans Avenue, Good Old War and more.

== Past Performers ==
2012: Tedeschi Trucks Band, Dawes, Carolina Chocolate Drops, Rodney Crowell, Jukebox the Ghost, Quincy Mumford and the Reason Why, Cheryl Wheeler, Sara Watkins, Brother Joscephus and the Love Revival Revolution Orchestra, Scrapomatic, and Mason Porter.

2011: Ani DiFranco, Gogol Bordello, Trombone Shorty, Nicole Atkins, Red Horse, Good Old War, David Wax Museum, Josh Ritter, Runa, Avi Wisnia, John Francis, and Napalm Da Bomb.

2010: The Avett Brothers, Sharon Jones & The Dap-Kings, Patty Griffin with Special Guest Buddy Miller, Enter The Haggis, Richard Shindell, 61 North, The Mayhem Poets and Napalm Da Bomb. Emcees: Gene Shay, Michaela Majoun.

2008: Marc Cohn, They Might Be Giants, Suzanne Vega, The Smithereens, Vienna Teng, Enter The Haggis, Lucy Kaplansky, Red Molly, Christina Courtin, Matt Duke, Alfred James Band, Nicole Reynolds. Emcees: Gene Shay, Michaela Majoun.

2007: Robert Randolph & The Family Band, Joan Armatrading, Amos Lee, North Mississippi Allstars, Chris Smither, Leon Redbone, Adrienne Young, Travis Sullivan's Bjorkestra, Sam Shaber, Hoots & Hellmouth, Kate Gaffney and Carsie Blanton. Emcees: Gene Shay, Michaela Majoun.

2006: Fountains of Wayne, Richard Thompson, Janis Ian, Duncan Sheik, David Jacobs-Strain, Slo-Mo, Daniela Cotton, Toad the Wet Sprocket, Crooked Still, James Hunter, Klezmatics, Birdie Bush, and Cabin Dogs. Emcees: Gene Shay, Michaela Majoun.

2005: Rufus Wainwright, Aimee Mann, Madeleine Peyroux, Mavis Staples, Stephen Kellogg and the Sixers, Loudon Wainwright III, Lucy Kaplansky, John Gorka, Phil Roy, Lori McKenna, John Francis, and Bet Williams. Emcees: Gene Shay, Michaela Majoun.

2004: Ani DiFranco, Jonatha Brooke, Shawn Colvin, Los Lonely Boys, Lizz Wright, Erin McKeown, John Hammond, Tempest, Ember Swift, The Kennedys, Slo-Mo, and Stargazer Lily. Emcees: Gene Shay, Michaela Majoun.

2003: Joan Armatrading, Rosanne Cash, Little Feat, Martin Sexton, Kim Richey, Jeffrey Gaines, Gaelic Storm, Vance Gilbert and Ellis Paul, 4 Way Street, Xavier Rudd, and Amos Lee. Emcees: Gene Shay, Michaela Majoun.

2002: Jackson Browne, Jonatha Brooke, Nerissa & Katryna Nields, Grey Eye Glances, Guy Davis, Kelly Joe Phelps, Entrain, Dave Carter & Tracy Grammer, Da Vinci's Notebook, 4 Way Street, and Patty Blee. Emcees: Gene Shay, Michaela Majoun.

2001: The Robert Cray Band, Lucinda Williams, BeauSoleil avec Michael Doucet, Dar Williams, Sarah Harmer, Ron Sexsmith, Phil Roy, Jess Klein, Oscar Lopez, Tom Landa & The Paperboys, Jeff Lang, and 4 Way Street. Emcees: Gene Shay, Michaela Majoun.

2000: Mary Chapin Carpenter, Richard Thompson, Jonatha Brooke, Moxy Früvous, Martin Sexton, John Gorka, Greg Brown, David Gray, Lucy Kaplansky, Willy Porter, The Asylum Street Spankers, Ben Arnold, and Vanida Gail. Emcees: Gene Shay, Michaela Majoun, Helen Leicht and David Dye.

1999: Arlo Guthrie, Bruce Cockburn, Susan Werner, The Nields, Olu Dara, Great Big Sea, Ann Rabson, Ellis Paul, Stacey Earle, and John Train. Emcees: Gene Shay, Helen Leicht.

1998: Indigo Girls, Iris DeMent, Moxy Früvous, Livingston Taylor, Grey Eye Glances, Vance Gilbert, Karen Savoca, Joseph Parsons, Big Bill Morganfield, Whirligig, and Michelle Nagy. Emcee: Gene Shay.

1997: John Prine, Madeleine Peyroux, Dar Williams, Richie Havens, Jeffrey Gaines, Martin Sexton, disappear fear, Richard Shindell, David Olney, June Rich & Nancy Falkow. Emcees: Gene Shay, Michaela Majoun and Keith Brand.

1996: Emmylou Harris, Leo Kottke, Janis Ian, Kips Bay, Catie Curtis, Moxy Früvous, Vance Gilbert, Garnet Rogers, Les Sampou, Charlie Zahm, Susan Piper. Emcees: Gene Shay, Michaela Majoun and Keith Brand.

1995: Shawn Colvin, Arlo Guthrie, Wolfstone, Cliff Eberhardt, Dar Williams, Vince Bell, Joseph Parsons Band (replaced Christine Lavin), Jennie Avila & Amy Torchia, John Flynn, Women's Sekere Ensemble and Karen Capaldi. Emcees: Gene Shay, Keith Brand, Chuck Elliott and Kathy O'Connell.

1994: Nanci Griffith, Laura Nyro, Chris Smither, Iain Matthews, Trout Fishing in America (band), Cheryl Wheeler, David Broza, Guy Davis, Ben Arnold, Sojourn (now Grey Eye Glances), Matt Sevier and Karen Farr. Emcees: Gene Shay, David Dye, Michaela Majoun and Kathy O'Connell.

1993: Randy Newman, Livingston Taylor, Patty Larkin, David Massengill, Greg Brown and Bill Morrissey, Ani DiFranco, Satan and Adam, Shirley Lewis Experee-ance, The Low Road, Joseph Parsons, Susan Werner and Jaime Morton. Emcees: Gene Shay, David Dye, Michaela Majoun and Kathy O'Connell.

1992: The Roches, Holly Near, John Gorka, Tom Chapin, Chris Smither, Don Henry, the story (featuring Jonatha Brooke & Jennifer Kimball), Ben Arnold, Beth Williams and Vance Gilbert. Emcees: Gene Shay, David Dye and Tom Gala.

1991: Kate & Anna McGarrigle, Livingston Taylor, John Sebastian, John Hammond, Rory Block, Jorma Kaukonen, Dave Van Ronk, Vassar Clements, Joseph Parsons and The Low Road. Emcee: Jim Albertson.

1990: Tom Paxton, Holly Near, Leon Redbone, Loudon Wainwright III, Bill Miller, Joseph Parsons, Cathy Fink & Marcy Marxer, Lew London Duo, Small Change and Endless Mountain Bluegrass Band. Emcee: Jim Albertson.

1989: Don McLean, Tom Rush, Livingston Taylor, The Taproom Band, Elaine Silver, Pinelands Dulcimer Society and Shirley Keller. Emcees: Tim Donald and Kevin Kelly.
