= Clean Ocean Action =

US non-profit organization

- Founded: 1984; 42 years ago
- Type: Non-profit, Interest group
- Tax ID no.: 22-2897204
- Headquarters: Long Branch, New Jersey
- Services: Research, public education, citizen action
- Fields: Protecting marine waters off the New Jersey/New York coast
- Members: Coalition of 125 businesses, groups and organizations
- Trustee President: Tom Fagan
- Executive Director: Cindy Zipf
- Website: https://cleanoceanaction.org/

Clean Ocean Action (COA) is a non-profit organization that works to protect the marine water quality in the New York Bight through extensive scientific analysis, public education, and resident activity endeavors as their core duty. It was formed in 1984 by a wide coalition of environmentally conscious businesses, groups, and organizations.

== History ==
New Jersey's Shore was filled with a large amount of trash that resulted in the closing of their beaches and being known as one of the largest ocean-dumping sites in 1984. After several concerns took place regarding the rise of trash on the site, Clean Action Ocean was established to help educate, advocate, and take action on cleaning along the coast to restore it to its natural state.

Since then, the Clean Ocean Action has shut down 8 ocean-dumping sites and continued to support the Clean Ocean Zone policy and the BEACH Act. During Clean Ocean Action's clean-up activities, the organization collects data to understand and identify the cause of harm to the environment by gathering littered trashes. Their research is displayed to federal and state programs in order to uphold heavier enforcement on protecting the ocean.

== Objectives ==
The Clean Ocean Action's objective is to prevent any harm that would potentially damage the debased water nature near the shores of New Jersey. The organization advocates for the protection of marine wildlife, clean beaches, and the preservation of all natural resources that would harm the environment by establishing several campaigns, programs, interactive events, active rallies, and teachings. The Executive Director, Cindy Zipf, suggests that citizens should practice utilizing reusable items, recycling, avoid littering, and participating in local clean-ups. These actions reduces the amount of pollution in the ocean and reduces the risk of endangering marine wildlife. Clean Ocean Action takes additional action by persuading public authorities to ensure the safety of the beaches and marine wildlife. Clean Ocean Action influences many citizens, from any age and background, to contribute to beach clean-ups and promotes the conservation of natural resources.

== Volunteer ==
Volunteers for Clean Ocean Action clean beaches with the goal of creating a clean environment and saving marine wildlife from danger. Volunteers consists of students, families, business, other non-profit organizations, and more. Children under the age of 12 are able to volunteer as long as they are accompanied by an adult. Millions of pieces of harmful debris has been removed from beaches and waterways by the volunteers.

== Programs ==
There are several programs that Clean Ocean Action organizers to educate citizens on the system of the environment and to take action. This includes the Clean Ocean Action's "Student Environmental Advocates and Leaders" (SEAL) program conducts pieces of training where students will brainstorm on how to create solutions through advocacy and campaigns on environmental studies. The organizations also organizes annual "beach sweeps" where volunteers gather at Raritan Bay where they clean the beaches, waterways, and underwater sites as they move along towards the Delaware Bay.

Additionally, Clean Ocean Action's Student Summit program allows middle schoolers to study about marine wildlife and the environment through several hands-on experience activities. The Clean Ocean Action Presentations teaches students about the issues of ocean pollution that arises in the world today. Lastly, the Clean Ocean Action Education Ambassador Program allows individuals with presentation skills to administer topics on ocean pollution for various communities.
