= HelenaMaria =

American indie pop rock group

HelenaMaria is an American indie pop-rock group from New Jersey composed of identical twins Helena and Maria Mehalis.

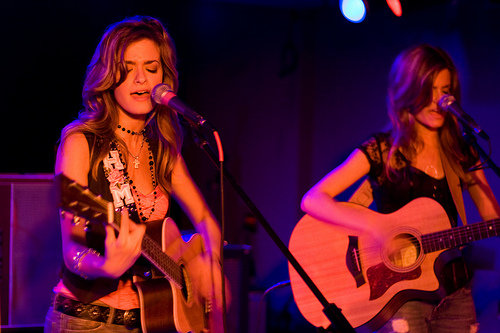
HelenaMaria in concert

== Biography ==
Born in New Brunswick, New Jersey, Helena and Maria grew up in a self described "free-spirited" environment promoting artistic expression. Since the age of 4 they took classical piano lessons and sang in their church choir. Also at the age of 4 they landed their first national commercial, later becoming members of the Screen Actors Guild. They were home-schooled until 7th grade. In their sophomore year in high school they learned to play the guitar, and songwriting soon followed. They later began performing at venues as much as possible all over New Jersey, New York City, and Pennsylvania.

Helena and Maria are identical twins, however Helena is right-handed and plays guitar fretting on the left hand and strumming on the right, while Maria is left-handed and plays it the opposite.

Helena and Maria write songs to reflect their life experiences. Maria explains: “Life experiences inspire me, but it's also observations of what others are going through, which could be completely irrelevant to my life, that somehow affect me, as well as my sister.”

Musically their skills on the piano and guitar are nearly identical, but they maintain that their songwriting style and vocals are slightly different.

In 2006, Helena and Maria recorded their first album, Serene, consisting of all original material.

Throughout 2009 and 2010, HelenaMaria have released cover versions and videos of popular songs for release on iTunes MP3 download and for viewing on YouTube. One of these videos to date has garnered attention from television and radio personality Ryan Seacrest.

HelenaMaria tried out for American Idol but were told to instead stick together as a duo by an executive producer of the show.

== Mainstream Success ==
In 2009, Helena and Maria appeared together as the actresses on Season 3 of Gossip Girl, beginning in episode 4, "Dan de Fleurette", which originally aired on October 5, 2009. They subsequently made at least 2 other small appearances on the show.

In May 2010, HelenaMaria's song for a Folgers coffee contest was selected as a finalist, and they got to appear in front of and meet American Idol judge Kara DioGuardi.

On August 18, 2010, television and radio personality Ryan Seacrest posted a HelenaMaria video on his blog asking his audience if HelenaMaria's cover of Eminem and Rihanna's "Love The Way You Lie" was better than the original. Saying he "got some really good feedback" on the video, Ryan Seacrest invited HelenaMaria onto his morning radio show. On August 23, 2010, HelenaMaria performed the song live on his show. Maria appeared on Season 6 of How I Met Your Mother.

== Other popular culture recognition ==
- HelenaMaria won Wrigley's Battle of the Bands to qualify for the mtvU Campus Invasion Tour 2007.
- HelenaMaria's song "Let Me Breathe" was featured on MTV's The Hills the week of 10/1/07.
- HelenaMaria were featured on mtvU's "Meet Or Delete".
- HelenaMaria were featured on CW11's "Spotlight On" series on 12/11/07. (WPIX New York)
- HelenaMaria are scheduled to have their song "Our Secret Place" featured in an upcoming movie, In My Sleep by Morning Star Pictures.
- HelenaMaria were featured on CBS-3's Verizon Sunday Kickoff Show. (CBS Philadelphia)
- HelenaMaria appear in the film "John Dies at the End" as Marconi's assistants.

== Line-up ==
=== Current members ===
- Helena Mehalis – Vocals, Keyboards, Guitar
- Maria Mehalis – Vocals, Keyboards, Guitar

== Discography ==
=== Studio albums ===
- “Serene” (2007)

=== iTunes/Amazon covers ===
- “The Climb (Miley Cyrus Cover)” (2009)
- “My Life Would Suck Without You (Kelly Clarkson Cover)” (2009)
- “Outta Here (Esmée Denters Cover)” (2009)
- “Love Story (Taylor Swift Cover)” (2009)
- “Forgive Me (Leona Lewis Cover)” (2009)
- "Telephone (Lady Gaga Cover)" (2010)
- "Love The Way You Lie (Eminem Cover)" (2010)
- "Rude Boy (Rihanna Cover) (2010)
- "Firework (Katy Perry Cover)" (2010)
- "Just The Way You Are (Bruno Mars Cover)" (2010)
- "Mine (Taylor Swift Cover)" (2010)
- " E.T - Futuristic Lovers (Katy Perry Cover )" (2011)
- "I Need A Doctor (Eminem Cover)" (2011)
- "Hold It Against Me (Britney Spears Cover)"(2011)
- "Titanium (David Guetta Featuring Sia Cover)" (2012)
- "We Are Never Ever Getting Back Together (Taylor Swift Cover)" (2012)
- "Blue Jeans (Lana Del Rey Cover)" (2012)
- "Live While We're Young (One Direction Cover)" (2012)
- "One More Night (Maroon 5 Cover)" (2012)
- "Diamonds (Rihanna Cover)" (2012)
- "Skyfall (Adele Cover)" (2012)
- "Stay (Rihanna Featuring Mikky Ekko Cover)" (2013)
- "Live Like A Warrior (Matisyahu Cover)" (2013)
- "Holy Grail (Jay Z Featuring Justin Timberlake Cover)" (2013)
- "Wake Me Up (Avicii Featuring Aloe Blacc Cover)" (2013)
- "Wrecking Ball (Miley Cyrus Cover)" (2013)
- "Timber (Pitbull Featuring Ke$ha Cover)" (2014)
- "Can't Remember to Forget You (Shakira Featuring Rihanna Cover)" (2014)
- "Magic (Coldplay Cover)" (2014)
- "Empire (Shakira Cover)" (2014)
- "Sing (Ed Sheeran Cover)" (2014)
