= Peter Robinson (department store) =

Former department store chain

Coordinates: 51°30′55.95″N 0°8′30.12″W

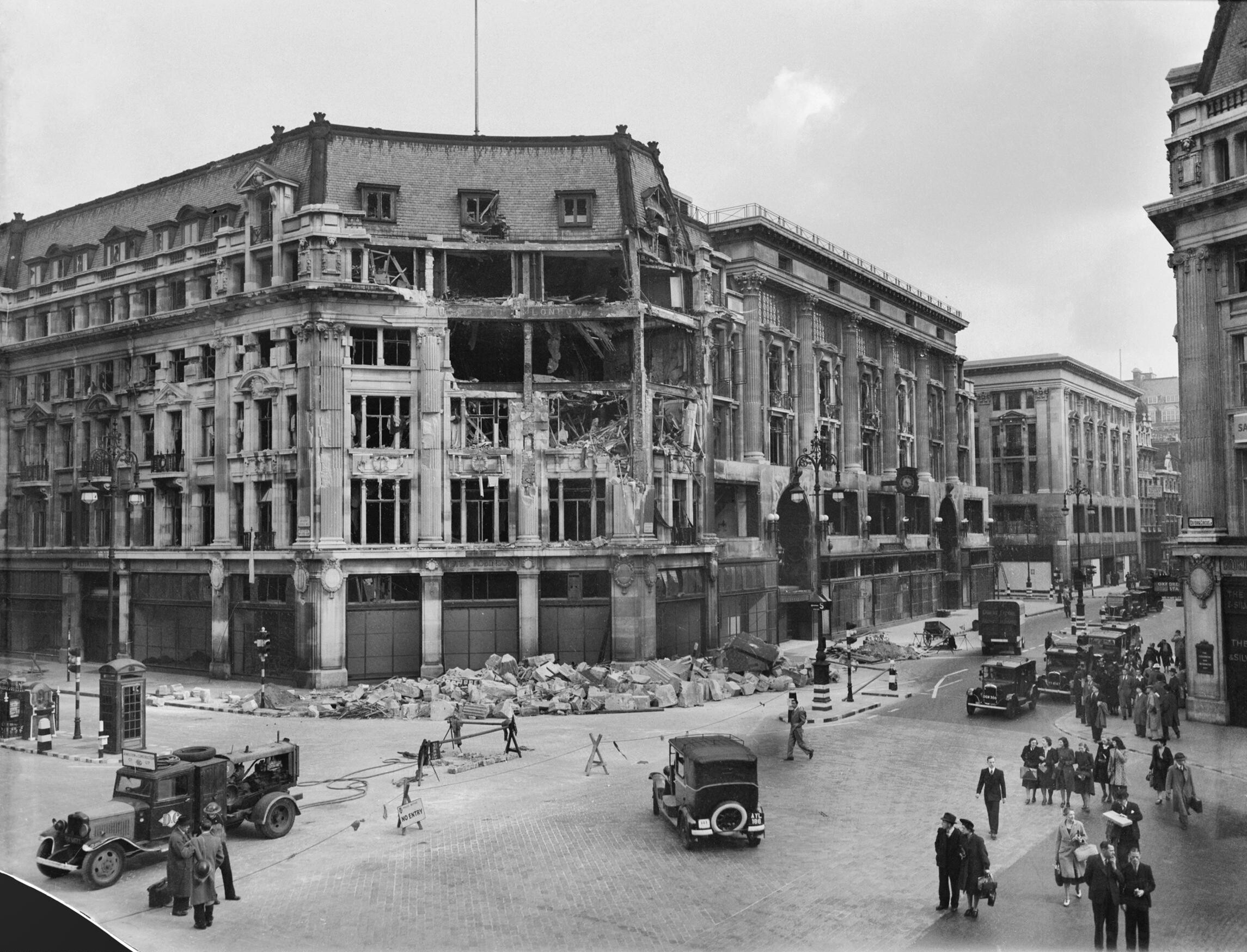
The flagship store at Oxford Circus, having suffered bomb damage in September 1940

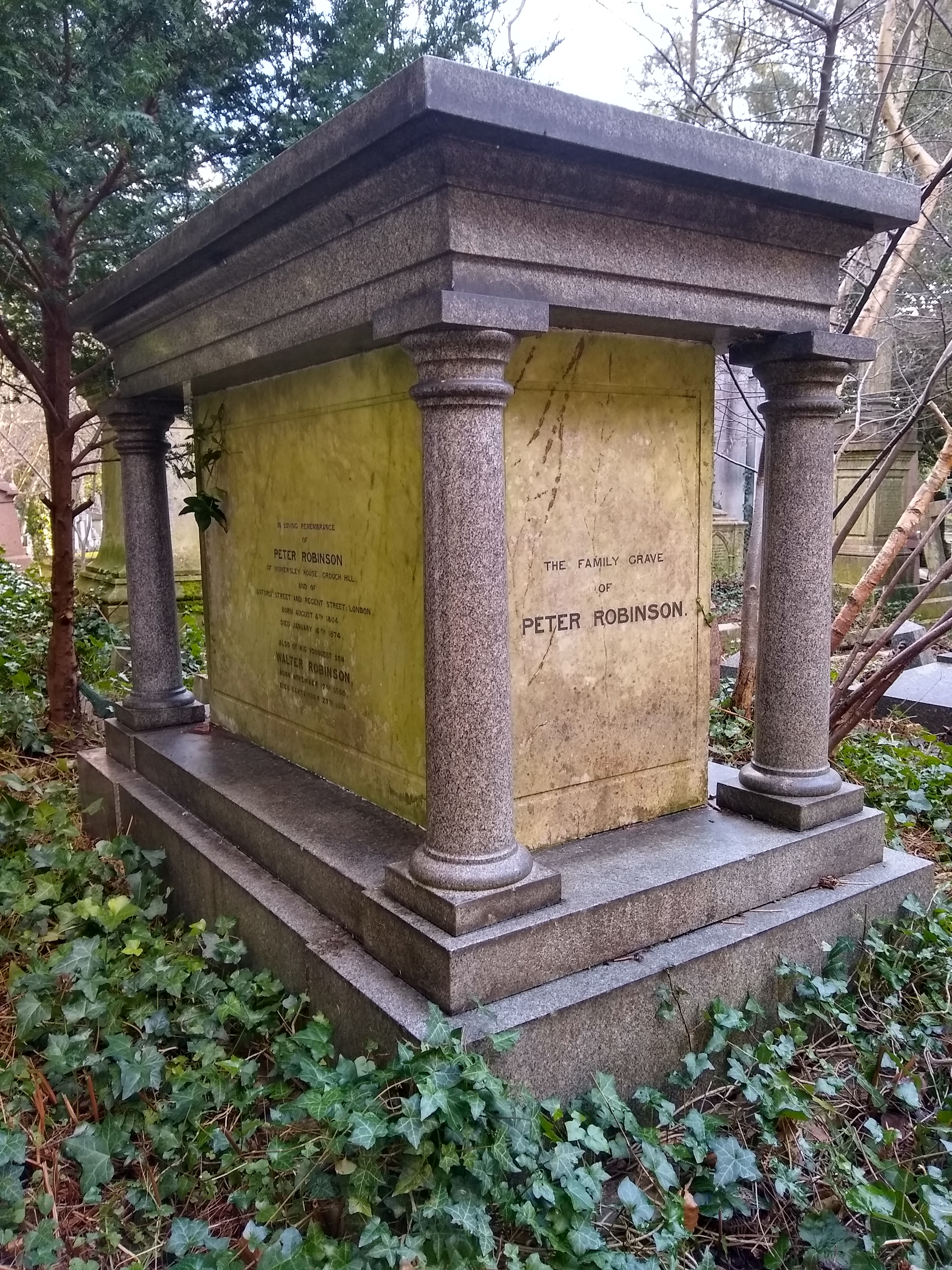
Family grave of Peter Robinson in Highgate Cemetery (west)

Peter Robinson was a chain of department stores with its flagship store being situated at Oxford Circus, London. Founded in 1833 as a drapery, Robinson bought up nearby shops on Oxford Street to create a department store. The Topshop chain debuted in 1964 as a section in a Peter Robinson branch. The shop building in Oxford Circus was completed in 1912 and is Grade II listed.

== History ==
Peter Robinson (1804–1874), a Yorkshireman, opened a linen drapery shop at 103 Oxford Street in 1833. By 1840, he had opened a Court & General Mourning House store at 247–249 Regent Street, which became known as "Black Peter Robinsons". They always had a brougham, harnessed with a coachman dressed in black and lady fitters sat inside, ready to hurry off to the home of a newly bereaved widow. He increased his store space in Oxford Street by buying up nearby shops, so by 1850 he was able to create a department store which was known for selling fashionable ladies clothes and accessories.

In 1865 he expanded further into Regent Street, buying Hodge and Lowman Linen drapers, which occupied 252–262 Regent Street.

During the 1850s, John Lewis, later the founder of a rival department store, worked for Peter Robinson, initially as a drapery assistant, but worked his way up to being the youngest silk buyer in London. In 1864 he was offered a partnership in the business, but declined. Instead, he opened his own drapery on Oxford Street. Peter Robinson, the founder is buried in a family grave at Highgate Cemetery. Robinson died in 1895 leaving the large sum of £ 1,119,660 in his will. (worth £ 113.5 million in 2022)

The current building at Oxford Circus was designed by architect Henry Tanner Junior. Being completed in 1912, it is Grade II listed. The building was substantially extended in 1923.

The business grew into a small chain of department stores and in 1946, Burton's (which became the Arcadia Group) took over the chain. The business continued to expand, with new stores opening across the United Kingdom, including Lime Street in Liverpool. Anglia Television televised the opening in 1961 of the Peter Robinson Store in Norwich (later a Topshop). At the height of the business Peter Robinson had 39 stores.

In 1964, to try to attract the younger buyer, Peter Robinson's Topshop was opened on the third floor of the Sheffield store (located in Angel Street). In 1965, the basement of the Oxford Circus store was converted to be a Peter Robinson Topshop.

In 1970, George Martin's Associated Independent Recording company opened the first AIR Studios recording complex on the top floor of the Oxford Circus building, where it remained in operation until 1992.

In 1974, Burton's Group, the parent company decided that Peter Robinson and Topshop should be separated, with Peter Robinson aiming for the over 25s. The number of stores was reduced from 22 to six. By the end of the 1970s the Peter Robinson brand had all but disappeared.
