= Steven R Schimmel =

American Jewish community leader

Steven Ralph Schimmel
- Born: August 23, 1983 (age 43); Conroe, Texas, U.S.
- Education: Manhattanville College, Rutgers University
- Occupation: Nonprofit executive
- Known for: Leadership in Jewish community organizations
- Title: Executive Director, Jewish Federation of Central Massachusetts

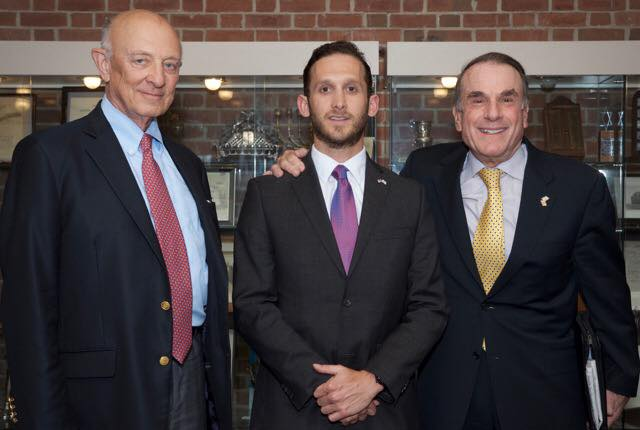
Steven Schimmel [center] with former CIA Director James Woolsey, left

Steven Ralph Schimmel (born August 23, 1983) is an American nonprofit executive and Jewish community leader. He is the Executive Director of the Jewish Federation of Central Massachusetts. Schimmel has been a visible figure in advocacy on issues of antisemitism, Israel, interfaith relations, and in Jewish cultural programming.

== Early life and education ==
Schimmel was raised in Vineland, NJ and attended Gloucester County Institute of Technology and was selected to the school's "Wall of Fame" in 2018. He attended Manhattanville College, where he studied history and political science, he was a visiting student at St Peters College, Oxford. Centre for Medieval and Renaissance Studies and has an MBA from Rutgers University. Schimmel's father was a survivor of the 1975 LaGuardia Airport bombing.

== Career ==
Schimmel began his professional career in Jewish advocacy work, working for Jewish Federation in Cumberland County NJ from 2010-2016 before becoming the Executive Director of the Jewish Federation of Central MA in 2016. At the time of his appointment as Director of Jewish Federation of Cumberland, Gloucester & Salem Counties, he was the youngest executive director among the 148 Jewish Federations in North America.

As director, Schimmel has overseen fundraising campaigns, security initiatives, Holocaust education, Israel advocacy, and interfaith programming. He led efforts to expand Holocaust education in local schools and created partnerships between the Jewish Federation and civic organizations across Central Massachusetts.

In 2011 he was named to Israeli Ministry of Foreign Affairs Young Jewish Diplomatic Seminar. He served as co-chair to the United States 40th Anniversary Commemoration of Operation Entebbe in 2016. In 2020, Schimmel was named to Worcester Business Journal’s *40 Under Forty* list, which recognized his leadership and community engagement. He was selected to the prestigious Leadership Worcester class of 2022.

== Public advocacy and media presence ==
Schimmel has been a frequent spokesperson on issues related to Israel, antisemitism, Jewish identity and the Gaza War. In 2023, he publicly criticized an anti-Israel rally in Worcester as "alarming" and described the rhetoric at the event as hostile to the Jewish community.

Following an increase in reported anti-Semitic incidents in Massachusetts, Schimmel was featured in Spectrum News. He stated that antisemitism had become more overt in recent years and called for greater awareness and unity against hatred.

In 2025, Schimmel joined a delegation of Jewish leaders from New England on a visit to Israel amid the release of hostages from Gaza. In interviews, he described the emotional impact of the trip and emphasized the importance of solidarity with Israeli families.

He has also spoken publicly about threats to Israeli diplomats, such as in the aftermath of a 2025 embassy shooting in Washington, D.C., where he urged public figures to avoid rhetoric that could inflame tensions.
