= Mrs. Jay's =

Restaurant in Asbury Park, NJ, US

- Interactive map of Mrs. Jay's

Restaurant information
- Location: 909-911 Ocean Avenue, Asbury Park, New Jersey, 07712, United States
- Coordinates: 40°13′11″N 74°0′3″W

Mrs. Jay's was a popular bar and restaurant located in Asbury Park, New Jersey.

It was founded by John and Ida Jacobs and was located on Ocean and Second Ave., the current location of The Stone Pony. John and Ida started by selling hot dogs to tourists in 1922 at the Second Avenue location, but with the help of their daughter Jeanette and son-in-law Murray Wiener, eventually purchased the seasonal snack bar along with the property and established a family restaurant, naming it Mrs. Jay's.

John and Ida also opened Mrs. Jay's Beer Garden located on Ocean Avenue to the left of the restaurant serving 2% beer until the end of prohibition in 1933. Starting in 1965, Mrs. Jay's Beer Garden briefly offered Go-Go dancing as entertainment, but a dancer’s see-through blouse resulted in a police raid and the quick demise of Go-Go at Mrs. Jay's.

The Wieners sold off the restaurant in the 1970s, keeping only the beer garden, which by this time had become a popular music scene and bikers hangout. In 1974, the new owners of the restaurant building converted it into the nightclub known as The Stone Pony.

Steven Adler from Guns N' Roses wore a Mrs. Jay's T-shirt during the "Paradise City" video. Many bikers drank here and a very large number of motorcycles can be seen parked in front of Mrs. Jay's Beer Garden in photos. Since Mrs. Jay's was an open-air establishment, it was open during the summer months. Mrs Jay's served mostly beer in pitchers or mugs and hotdogs and often featured live music.

After a change of ownership in the early to mid-1980s, Mrs. Jay's Beer Garden fell on hard times and eventually the venue closed around the end of the decade, a victim of the disintegrating Asbury Park beachfront area. During its existence until its final closing, it played host to many of the local scene's most popular bands and solo artists, capitalizing on the seaside shore town's nightlife scene. Bands such as the Tim Ryan Band, The Z Band, The Mango Brothers and The Acme Boogie Company were among the many local talents that regularly could be found on the stage there, with entertainment seven nights a week.

Sometime later, the beer garden structure was razed with the empty lot being acquired by the Stone Pony for use as an outdoor concert venue.
