= The Saint (music venue) =

Former nightclub in Asbury Park, New Jersey

Coordinates: 40.218888°N 74.012135°W

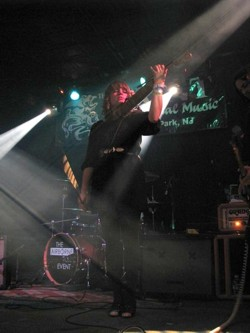
- The Airborne Toxic Event performing at the Saint
- Interactive map of The Saint
- Address: 601 Main Street
- Location: Asbury Park, New Jersey
- Owner: Scott Stamper
- Capacity: 175
- Type: Music venue
- Events: Acoustic rock, alternative rock, blues, electronic, folk, garage, groove, hard rock, indie, punk, reggae, rock, surf

Construction
- Opened: November 18, 1994
- Closed: November 18, 2022

Website
- www.thesaintnj.com

The Saint was a music venue located in Asbury Park, New Jersey. It was reminiscent of places like The Cellar Door in Washington, DC, CBGB, CB's 313 Gallery, and The Living Room in New York City, and featured live music. The Saint was founded by Adam Jon Weisberg along with business partner Scott Stamper, and opened its doors on November 18, 1994. Stamper bought out Weisberg in 2013 and became the sole owner. He is also a co-founder (along with Weisberg and Gordon Brown) of the Wave Gathering Music Festival. The club closed its doors on November 18, 2022, after losing its liquor license.

== Background ==
The Saint was an early site of the annual Asbury Park Music Awards ceremony founded by Stamper in collaboration with Pete Mantas. The awards ceremony, modeled after the Grammy Awards, features the presentation of awards between performances of live, original music. The event was originally called "The Golden T-Bird Awards" and was first held in 1993 at a small club on Main Street called the T-Bird Cafe. The awards ceremony was later moved to the Saint and renamed "The Asbury Music Awards" in 1995. When the event's attendance exceeded the Saint's capacity, the ceremony was rotated among larger venues, including The Fastlane, The Tradewinds, and The Stone Pony but the Saint remained a co-sponsor of the event.

The Saint has been credited with helping to keep the local music scene alive when newspapers said that the heyday of live music was over, and even The Stone Pony intermittently closed. It has been described as a landmark, the bedrock of the Asbury Park music scene, and an important venue for introducing emerging artists. It has also been called Asbury Park's "rock n’roll version of “Cheers,” where musicians and fans hang out together and everybody does know your name."

The Saint showcased a variety of new and well-known, local, national, and international acts that toured through the region. The club was describmed as more of a concert venue than a bar, and was described by music critics as one of the top five rock clubs in New Jersey.

The Saint had recording capability.

Some bands also performed on 90.5 The Night, Brookdale Public Radio before they performed at the Saint.

Shows designated as "Asbury Cafe" were acoustic, seated shows during which talking was not permitted while the acts were playing.

Age, attire, and nature of the audience varied with the bands, but was generally eclectic.

A 2020 GoFundMe campaign was started in an attempt to help ease COVID-19 shutdown struggles. On November 18, 2022, the owners of the Saint announced that they had lost their lease and liquor license, citing issues stemming from the COVID-19 pandemic. In April 2023, that owners stated their intent to reopen in a new location. However, as of November 2026, this has yet to happen.

== Notable acts ==
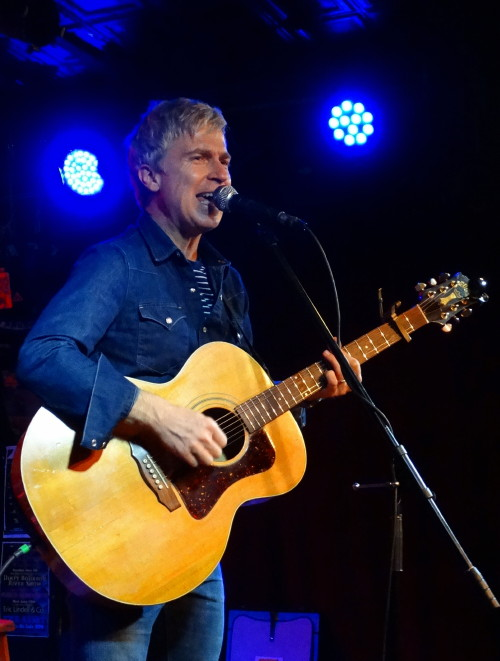
Nada Surf's Matthew Caws performing an acoustic show at the Saint in October 2017

Notable acts who have performed there include The Airborne Toxic Event, Nicole Atkins, Ben Folds Five, Bif Naked, Tracy Bonham, Buckethead, Cake, Cannibal Corpse, Ryan Cassata, Jen Chapin, Citizen Cope, Cowboy Mouth, Creed, The Dandy Warhols, Kimya Dawson, Deftones, Joe DeRosa, Dub Trio, The Duke Spirit, Everlast, Finger Eleven, Five for Fighting, The Ghost of a Saber Tooth Tiger, Green Jellÿ, Guster, John S. Hall, Robert Hazard, HelenaMaria, Hoobastank, Incubus, Jewel, Freedy Johnston, Joydrop, Kings of Leon, LP, The Lemonheads, Tony Levin, Toby Lightman, Lunachicks, Marcy Playground, Matthew Good Band, Anne McCue, Shannon McNally, Mindless Self Indulgence, Mod Fun, Modern English, Moe, Allie Moss, Moxy Früvous, Mucky Pup, Nada Surf, Leona Naess, Mieka Pauley, The Pierces, Rachel Platten, Queens of the Stone Age, Joey Ramone, Scars on 45, Maia Sharp, Kenny Wayne Shepherd, April Smith and the Great Picture Show, Bruce Springsteen, Stereophonics, The String Cheese Incident, Kasim Sulton, Tegan and Sara, The The, They Might Be Giants, The Trashcan Sinatras, Derek Trucks, Ween, Wussy, and Zebrahead.

== See also ==
- Wave Gathering
