= Mieka Pauley =

American singer-songwriter (born 1980)

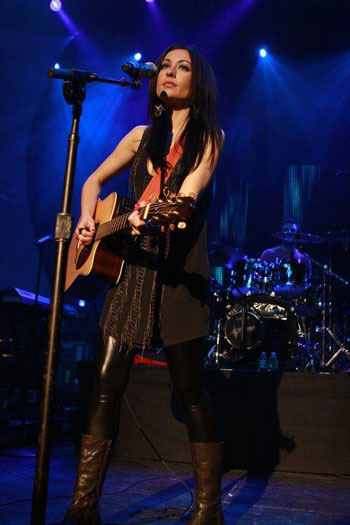
- Mieka Pauley at Terminal 5, 2008

Background information
- Born: Mary Dominica Pauley; October 22, 1980 (age 45); Boston, Massachusetts, U.S.
- Genres: Alt rock, Folk, Indie pop
- Occupation: Singer-songwriter
- Instruments: Voice, guitar
- Years active: 2000–present
- Website: mieka.com

Mary Dominica Pauley (born October 22, 1980), known professionally as Mieka Pauley, is an American singer-songwriter.

== Early life and education ==
Pauley was born in Boston and raised in Ohio, Kentucky, South Florida, and Colorado, where she attended Cherry Creek High School. She returned to Boston to attend Harvard University, where she entered the local music scene and began performing at coffeehouses and open-mic nights.

== Career ==
In 2005, she won the grand prize in the first Starbucks Emerging Artist competition. In 2008, she won the grand prize in both Cosmopolitan's StarLaunch and the New York Songwriters Circle Songwriting Competition, and she was nominated for a Boston Music Award.

She has appeared on Daytrotter, PRI Mountain Stage, BBC London, and Fox25 Boston. She has gone on tour with Citizen Cope and Edwin McCain.

== Personal life ==
She married Baratunde Thurston in July 2008. Pauley and Thurston divorced in 2010.

In 2010, Pauley started dating singer, songwriter, producer and DJ, Shane Maux, who also co-wrote her song, "Wreck". Pauley and Maux were married in 2016. They have two children together, twins Lilou Dominica Lynn and Luca Rain Orion, born in 2015.

== Discography ==
- In November 2007, she released Elijah Drop Your Gun. The budget of $17 thousand was financed by fans. In the summer of 2012, a song from this album, "Devil's Got My Secret" was featured in the Bruce Beresford film (starring Jane Fonda, Catherine Keener and Elizabeth Olsen) Peace, Love & Misunderstanding.
- In August 2009, she released an EP From the Mouth of Paris under the short-lived band name "The Mieka Canon" (since re-released under her own name) via Cosmopolitan Magazine's StarLaunch.
- In June 2012, she released The Science of Making Choices, financed completely by fans via PledgeMusic.
