= The London General Mourning Warehouse =

Merchant of funeral related products

Coordinates: 51.515°N 0.142°W

Jay's is on the left of this view of Regent Street around 1850

The London General Mourning Warehouse was a mourning warehouse on Regent Street. It was established by William Chickall Jay in 1841 and so it was commonly known as Jay's. It sold all types of goods needed for funerals and the elaborate mourning of the Victorian era.

== Gallery ==
Full page advertisement in The Illustrated London News, 8 September 1888

Around 1893

The 1922 plan for the reconstruction of Jay's by Sir Henry Tanner which was completed in 1925.
