= WBJB-FM =

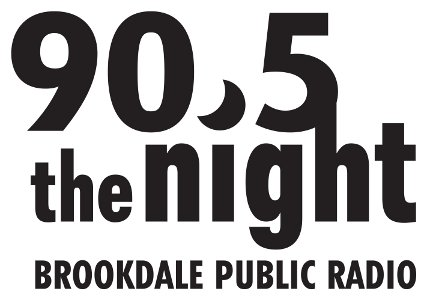
- Lincroft, New Jersey; United States
- Broadcast area: Monmouth County
- Frequency: 90.5 MHz (HD Radio)

Programming
- Format: Adult Album Alternative (AAA)
- Subchannels: HD2: Alternative Rock "Altrok Radio"; HD3: Free-form "Brookdale Student Radio"
- Affiliations: National Public Radio (NPR)

Ownership
- Owner: Brookdale Community College

History
- First air date: January 13, 1975
- Call sign meaning: Brookdale Jersey Blues

Technical information
- Licensing authority: FCC
- Facility ID: 7116
- Class: A
- ERP: 900 watts
- HAAT: 113.0 meters (370.7 ft)
- Transmitter coordinates: 40°19′19.00″N 74°7′57.00″W

Links
- Public license information: Public file; LMS
- Website: 90.5thenight.org

WBJB-FM (90.5 MHz "Brookdale Public Radio, 90.5 The Night"). is a non-commercial, listener-supported, public radio station, owned by Brookdale Community College and licensed to Lincroft, New Jersey. It serves Central Jersey with "The News You Need and the Music You Love."

WBJB-FM has an effective radiated power (ERP) of 900 watts as a Class A station. Its transmitter is located on Arena Drive on the campus of Brookdale Community College in Lincroft. The station broadcasts using HD radio technology. One digital subchannel carries alternative rock. Another subchannel airs "Brookdale Student Radio," which is free-form radio.

== Songwriters Concert Series ==
Brookdale Public Radio presents a "Songwriters Concert Series" each summer. The shows are free and open to the public. They are held, weather permitting, on the beach in Belmar, New Jersey and were formerly held at Riverside Gardens Park in Red Bank, New Jersey before moving to the 5th Avenue Beach in Belmar in 2013.

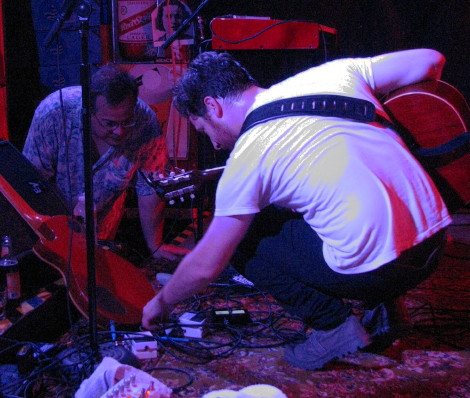
DJ Jeff Raspe helping Alex Dezen of The Damnwells with a technical problem at The Saint, September 2011

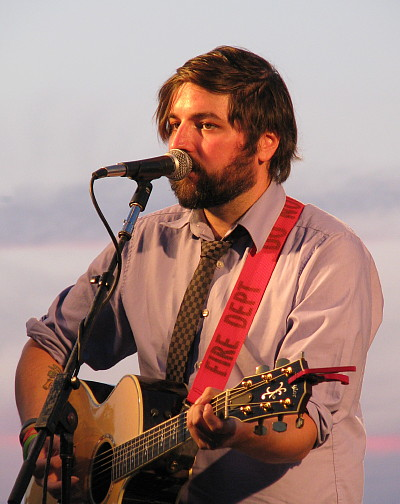
Rick Barry performing at the Songwriters in The Park series, sponsored by WBJB-FM Brookdale Public Radio on August 24, 2012.
