= The Stone Pony =

Music venue in Asbury Park, New Jersey

Coordinates: 40.21995°N 74.00058°W

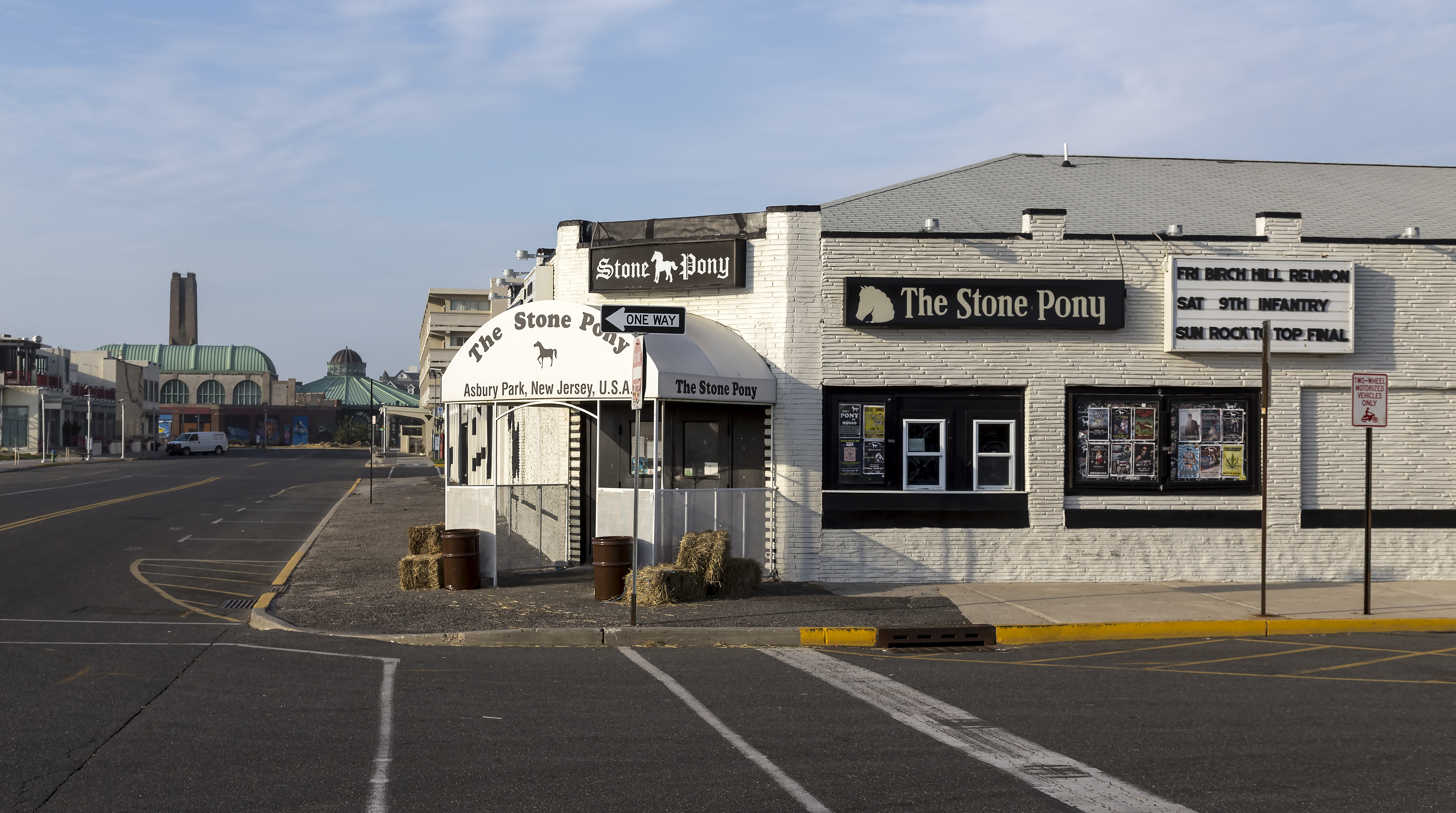
- The Stone Pony in Asbury Park, New Jersey in April 2016
- Interactive map of The Stone Pony
- Former names: Mrs. Jay's
- Address: 913 Ocean Ave; Asbury Park, New Jersey 07712-6221
- Location: Asbury Park Boardwalk
- Capacity: 850; 4,500 (outdoor Summer Stage)
- Public transit: NJ Transit at Asbury Park station North Jersey Coast Line NJT Bus: 830, 832, 836

Construction
- Opened: February 1974

Website
- Official website

The Stone Pony is a music venue in Asbury Park, New Jersey, known for launching the careers of several New Jersey music legends, including Bruce Springsteen, Jon Bon Jovi, and Southside Johnny and the Asbury Jukes. The club opened in 1974.

== History ==
=== 20th century ===
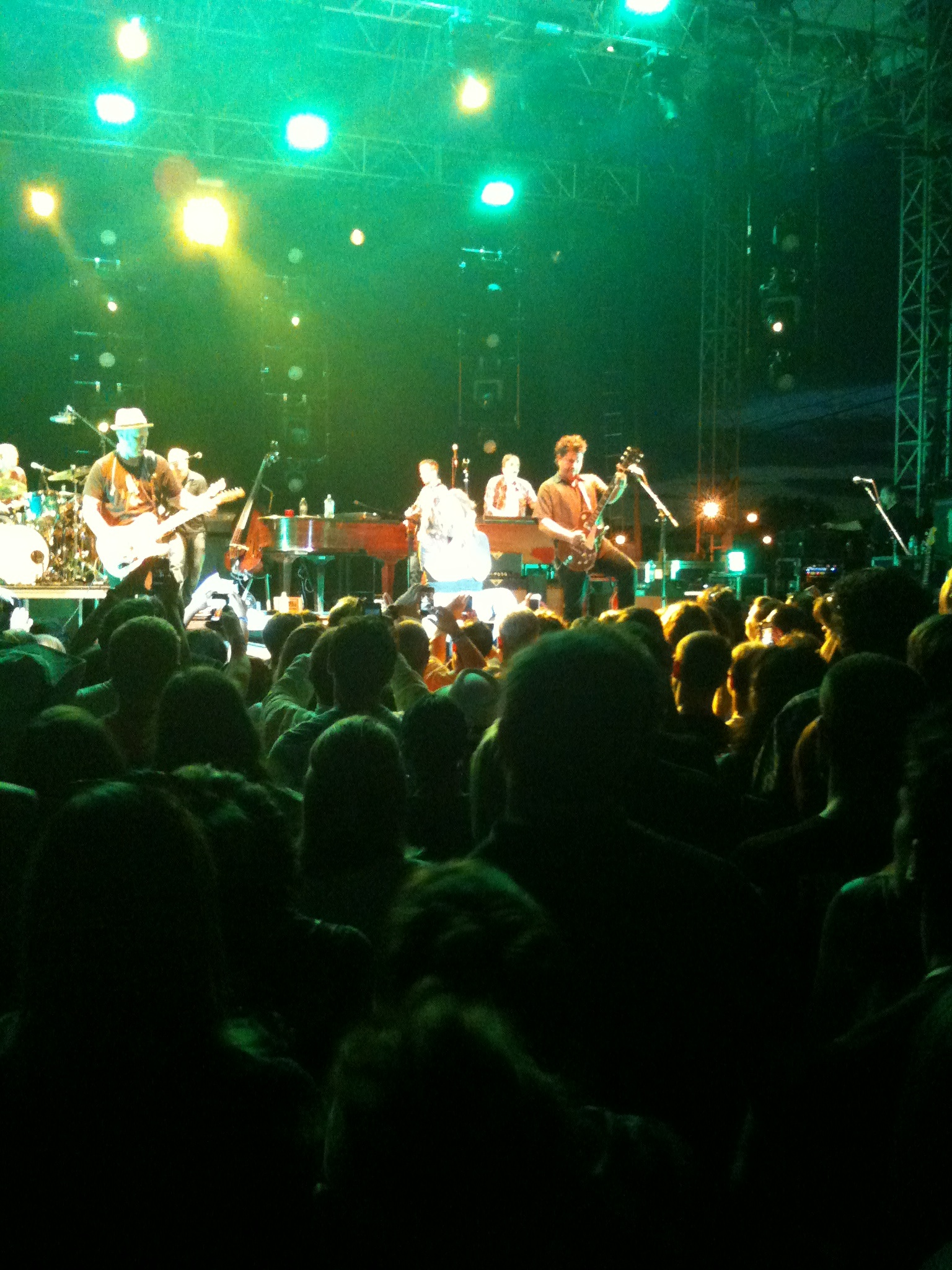
Counting Crows playing at The Stone Pony in June 2012

Before the Garden State Parkway made it easier to reach points further south, Asbury Park was a prominent shore vacation destination in New Jersey; since the late 1800s, many city establishments have offered live musical entertainment.

The building that would become the Stone Pony once housed a restaurant named Mrs. Jay's, later named Mrs. Jay's Beer Garden, that was frequented by a polyglot community of tourists, high school and college students, and bikers. During the mid-1960s, Mrs. Jay's management began to allow bands to perform. After the restaurant and beer garden went out of business in 1968, allegedly over a waitress wearing a see-through blouse, Mrs. Jay's reopened two doors south. The second incarnation of Mrs. Jays became a notorious biker hangout in its later days before being demolished in the late 1980s. Harley-Davidsons lined entire blocks after cruising the circuit.

The building that originally housed Mrs. Jay's reopened in fall 1973 as The Stone Pony. Many of the world's most popular musical artists have played on its stage. In 1991, The Stone Pony filed for bankruptcy after a series of drunk-driving lawsuits. However, the nightclub reopened in 1992. Because of its importance to the music world, there was a national outcry when there was talk of closing the Pony during the late 1990s. The Stone Pony was repeatedly opened and closed as developers targeted Asbury Park through the beginning of the new millennium, and musicians and patrons organized and rallied in support of The Stone Pony.

The annual Asbury Park Music Awards ceremony, founded in 1993 as "The Golden T-Bird Awards" and renamed "The Asbury Park Music Awards" in 1995, is usually held at The Stone Pony. The awards recognize excellence in the region's music community. The format for the ceremony is similar to that of the Grammy Awards. It features the presentation of awards between performances of live, original music and poetry. The event is jointly sponsored by The Stone Pony, The Saint, WBJB-FM, and The Aquarian Weekly.

=== 21st century ===
The club was renovated in 2000, preserving the character associated with its early years while adding a permanent exhibition of art and artifacts from the history of the city and the venue itself. State-of-the-art lighting and sound equipment were installed, and outside, facing the Atlantic Ocean, The Stone Pony Landing area was redone with a beach motif, tenting and food facility. Fans and artists continued to support the Pony, and the Asbury Park Music Awards returned to the Stone Pony.

Eventually, the music community prevailed, and a vibrant live music scene reemerged and crowds returned. "A visit to The Stone Pony has been considered a pilgrimage to rock 'n' roll fans around the world. "It is a place that is important not just to us, but to the world," New Jersey Governor Christine Todd Whitman said as she officially reopened the club on Memorial Day weekend 2000.

Before it reopened in 2000, The Stone Pony owners promised to become involved in the Asbury Park community. The club and the city co-sponsored a weekend-long Asbury Park Festival along the oceanfront. The festival was free to the public and featured local arts and crafts vendors as well as live music both inside and outside the club. The U.S. Postal Service created a special cancellation for the event, and hundreds of people lined up to have envelopes stamped for the occasion. The club was open in the evening, and part of the proceeds was donated to the Stephen Crane House on Fourth Avenue in the city, where the author of The Red Badge of Courage lived during much of his short life.

The Stone Pony has hosted events supporting Asbury Park-area community groups and charities. Proceeds from a concert entitled "Remembering Harry Chapin" benefited a charity that fights world hunger, and the club has been designated as an official drop-off point for the Food Banks of Monmouth and Ocean Counties. The club held a fundraising event for the Jersey Shore Jazz and Blues Foundation, the Acoustic Musicians Guild, sponsored a concert at which Bruce Springsteen appeared in support of the Parkinson's Disease Foundation, and held a benefit event for the family of a young man who lost his life in a motorcycle accident.

The club and the community offered the first Asbury Park showing of a photography exhibit spotlighting the city by students of the Rugby School at Woodfield for learning disabled and behaviorally challenged students. The Stone Pony's management also established "The Stone Pony Foundation" to promote music education at the elementary and high school levels. An amplifier was purchased for an aspiring teenage blues guitarist from the area, and the club was a sponsor for an event at another venue which benefited music and art education in Asbury Park schools.

== Stone Pony Summer Stage ==
Stone Pony Summer Stage is the May-to-October outdoor venue at the Stone Pony; its capacity of 4,500 is far larger than the club's indoor 850-person capacity. It is on the site of the former live music venue, beer garden and biker bar known as the second iteration of Mrs. Jay's.

== See also ==
- New Jersey music venues by capacity
- North to Shore Festival
- The Aquarian Weekly
- Music of Asbury Park
- The Turf Club
- Asbury Park Convention Hall
- Bruce Springsteen Center for American Music at Monmouth University
