= Hearts of Stone (Southside Johnny and the Asbury Jukes album) =

Studio album by Southside Johnny and the Asbury Jukes
- Released: October 13, 1978
- Recorded: January – June 1978
- Studio: Secret Sound Studios, New York, NY
- Genre: Rock, R&B
- Length: 34:48
- Label: Epic
- Producer: Steven Van Zandt

Southside Johnny and the Asbury Jukes chronology
This Time It's for Real (1977)	Hearts of Stone (1978)	The Jukes (1979)

Singles from Hearts of Stone
- 1. "Trapped Again/This Time Baby's Gone For Good" Released: 1978 (US-Canada); 2. "I Played the Fool/Light Don't Shine" Released: 1978 Nov 17 (UK); 3. "Talk To Me/This Time Baby's Gone For Good" Released: 1979 March 23 (UK)

Professional ratings
Review scores
Source	Rating
AllMusic	4.5/5 stars
Cherwell	4/5 stars
The Rolling Stone Album Guide	4/5 stars

Hearts of Stone is the third album by New Jersey rock band Southside Johnny and the Asbury Jukes, released in October 1978. The album peaked at number 112 on the Billboard 200 chart during the week of January 13, 1979. All of the album's songs were written by Southside Johnny, Bruce Springsteen, and E Street Band guitarist Steven Van Zandt. Van Zandt, the band's manager, also produced, arranged and played guitar.

== History ==
Work on the album began in January 1978 at the Record Plant in New York City. After recording approximately eight songs (see "Outtakes" section below), both Southside Johnny and Steve Van Zandt felt that the material was not meeting their standards, and as a result temporarily abandoned the album sessions. Several months later, after meeting to rehearse material at Carroll Music in Manhattan, sessions resumed at Secret Sound Studios in downtown NYC. The songs that became the final album were thereafter recorded during the short breaks between the Jukes' busy touring schedule, and were mixed by Van Zandt between appearances on Bruce Springsteen's Darkness on the Edge of Town tour.

Springsteen penned the title track and the radio-friendly "Talk To Me", and is credited along with Southside Johnny and Van Zandt on "Trapped Again", but Van Zandt takes solo credit for the remaining six tracks. More to the point, this record pointed the way to the kind of music the reincarnated "Little Steven" would begin making in the early 1980s. Van Zandt asked photographer Frank Stefanko to shoot the album cover art, after meeting during Springsteen's Darkness on the Edge of Town.

The first two tracks, the guitar-driven, syncopated rave-up "Got To Find a Better Way Home" and the horn-powered "This Time Baby's Gone for Good", are classic Van Zandt compositions, heavily anchored in '60s soul. The bouncy third track belies its lyric; "I Played the Fool" makes very good use of bass and horns to carve a distinctive sound. The title track was demoed by Springsteen and the E Street Band, along with "Talk To Me", at the Record Plant on October 14, 1977. Engineer Thom Panunzio dubbed them to cassette for Van Zandt (not present at the session), memorialized by a note reproduced in 2010's "The Promise: The Darkness on the Edge of Town Story". During 1978 sessions at Secret Sound Studios, he combined the base rhythm track from the tape with Southside's vocals, brass by the Miami Horns, and his own lead guitar. "Hearts of Stone" is soulful, almost wan, as it details the ache of lovers who cannot be together, while "Talk To Me", provided a bridge to the Jukes' familiar sound from their first two records. Pointing the way to the sound they would embrace on their next record, the record's final track, "Light Don't Shine", is light on horns and relies more on detailed guitar, alongside a soft-voiced, reflective Johnny. This song would, ironically, prove to be something of an epitaph.

The album was well received by critics upon its release. However, Lyon severely injured his hand on November 13, 1978, which impacted the band's touring schedule. In an interview from 2000, he recalled, "I had cut my arm on a glass during a show in Sacramento. I was supposed to be off the road for three months at least and we were back on the road in two weeks. We had a huge tour booked. We were going to be gone for a year. The record company had actually started to get into it, but as soon as I got hurt and was off the road, they kind of said 'That’s that' and moved on to other things. It was bitter for me then, but over time you learn that’s just the way this business is." In addition to being released by Epic Records, the group also parted ways with its manager and producer, Miami Steve Van Zandt. Their next album, The Jukes, would rely on songs written by members of the band. It was not until 1991's "Better Days" that Van Zandt and Springsteen would rejoin Southside Johnny for many of the tracks.

After Hearts of Stone, the Asbury Jukes released several other well-received albums. However, they failed to achieve commercial success and moved from label to label in the following decades, scratching out their existence in little-known bars not much higher in stature than the clubs they played on the way up. In 1987, Rolling Stone voted Hearts of Stone among the top 100 albums from 1967 to 1987 (#92). In 2000, The New York Times numbered it among the best albums the band had released, along with debut I Don't Want To Go Home, Reach Up and Touch the Sky and At Least We Got Shoes. Jon Bon Jovi claims that the title track, "Hearts of Stone", was the inspiration for his song "Never Say Goodbye".

== Outtakes ==
Additional songs were recorded for the album including "Inside of Me", "Princess of Little Italy", "Until the Good Is Gone", "Forever", "Angel Eyes" and "I've Been Waiting" which were not included on the final album release but were re-recorded by Steve Van Zandt for his first solo album Men Without Women. Versions of "Forever" and "Until the Good Is Gone" with Southside Johnny on vocals can be heard on his live album Hearts of Stone LIVE from 2009. Additionally, the track "Working Girl" was originally recorded during these sessions and appears on Southside's 2004 release Missing Pieces, which contains the recordings made during the lost 1982 sessions. The liner notes state the song is from the Hearts of Stone sessions and the track features the clear presence of Steven Van Zandt on harmony vocals. Early versions of the songs "Walking Through Midnight" (eventually re-recorded in 1988 for the Slow Dance album) and "Shake 'Em Down" (re-recorded for 1991's Better Days) were also recorded during the 1978 album sessions.

On July 2, 2011, Southside Johnny and the Asbury Jukes recorded a live performance of Van Zandt's entire Men Without Women album for release on CD, which includes all of the songs originally written and recorded for Hearts of Stone that were eventually passed over.

== Track listing ==
All tracks composed by Steven Van Zandt; except where indicated

1. "Got To Be a Better Way Home" - 3:23
2. "This Time Baby's Gone for Good" - 3:28
3. "I Played the Fool" - 3:29
4. "Hearts of Stone" (Bruce Springsteen) - 4:31
5. "Take It Inside" - 3:22
6. "Talk To Me" (Springsteen) - 4:02
7. "Next To You" - 3:39
8. "Trapped Again" (Springsteen, John Lyon, Van Zandt) - 4:21
9. "Light Don't Shine" - 4:33

== Personnel ==
- Southside Johnny – lead vocals
- Billy Rush – lead guitar, rhythm guitar
- Kevin Kavanaugh – keyboards
- Alan Berger – bass
- Max Weinberg – drums
- Steven Van Zandt – vocals, rhythm guitar (lead guitar on "Hearts of Stone")
- The Miami Horns
  - Bob Muckin – trumpet
  - Rick Gazda – trumpet
  - Stan Harrison - tenor saxophone
  - Richie Rosenberg – trombone
  - Ed Manion - baritone saxophone

Technical personnel

- Steven Van Zandt - producer, mixing
- Jack Malken – engineer, mixing
- Michael Barry – assistant engineer
- assistant engineer
- Southside Johnny – mixing
- Frank Stefanko – photography
- Bob Ludwig – mastering
