= Reach Up and Touch the Sky =

Live album by Southside Johnny and the Asbury Jukes
- Released: 1981
- Recorded: June–July 1980
- Genre: R&B, Rock, Pop
- Length: 67:23
- Label: Mercury
- Producer: Stephan Galfas, Johnny Lyon

Reach Up and Touch the Sky, sometimes called Reach Out and Touch the Sky, is a 1981 double live album by Southside Johnny and the Asbury Jukes. Released on Mercury Records in 1981 to satisfy the contract of the band, which had recently broken up, it was a moderate commercial success, charting in the United States and reviving the band's flagging sales. It was also critically well received. In 2003, the Rough Guide to Rock indicated that the album was the band's "defining moment".

== Background ==
In the early 1980s, the band was losing its commercial edge, which at least in the United Kingdom was related to the band's close connection with such then old-school rock as Bruce Springsteen in the era of punk rock. At the end of 1980, Southside Johnny broke up the band (though it later reunited), and the double live album was released in 1981 to complete the band's contract with Mercury Records. According to NME, the album at least temporarily put an end to the band's commercial decline. Although a moderate seller in the United Kingdom, the album charted in the United States, reaching #80 on Billboard's Pop Albums chart and #31 on Rock Albums.

== Critical reception ==
Professional ratings
Review scores
Source	Rating
Allmusic	4/5 stars
Rolling Stone	3.5/5 stars

The album has been critically well received. Rough Guides stated that the music itself was "[h]ot and sweaty" and "could not disappoint." Though noting that fans might miss Steve Van Zandt, who was not performing with the band at this time, Allmusic indicates that "this is still a storming document of a great act in their prime" featuring "most of the best selections from their Epic and Mercury albums, along with some superb covers." On its release in 1981, Rolling Stone described the album as "the penultimate party band playing unsurpassed party music."

In 1993, the Los Angeles Times described the album as "magnificent", and in 2000 the New York Times numbered it among the band's best albums, along with debut I Don't Want To Go Home, Hearts of Stone and At Least We Got Shoes. In that same year, PopMatters compared the album to then-current release Live at the Paradise Theater, finding Reach Up and Touch the Sky superior in sound quality, but preferring the "intensity and performance" of the newer release.

== Track listing ==
1. "I'm So Anxious" (Billy Rush) – 3:08
2. "Talk to Me" (Bruce Springsteen) – 6:03
3. "All I Want Is Everything" (John Lyon, Billy Rush) – 3:24
4. "Hearts of Stone" (Springsteen) – 4:28
5. "Take It Easy" (Jackson Browne, Glenn Frey) - 0:45**
6. "Trapped Again" (Lyon, Springsteen, Steven Van Zandt) – 5:14
7. "Why Is Love Such a Sacrifice" (Rush) – 6:33
8. "Restless Heart" (Lyon, Rush) – 3:42
9. "Vertigo" (Rush) – 4:05
10. "I Don't Want to Go Home" (Van Zandt) – 3:47
11. "The Fever" (Springsteen) – 7:07
12. "Stagger Lee" (Lloyd Price, Harold Logan) - 8:13**
13. "Sam Cooke Medley: Only Sixteen/(What A) Wonderful World/You Send Me/A Change Is Gonna Come" (Lou Adler, Herb Alpert, Sam Cooke) – 4:15
14. "Bring It on Home" (Cooke) – 3:26
15. "Havin' a Party" (Cooke) – 6:01
16. "Back in the U.S.A." (Chuck Berry) – 4:44
17. "Medley: Having a Party, Pt. 2/Roll Out the Barrel" (Lew Brown, Cooke, Wladimir Timm, Jaromír Vejvod, Vasek Zeman) – 1:26

Tracks marked with ** were not included on the original CD release, but were restored for subsequent CD reissues.

== Personnel ==
=== Performance ===
- Southside Johnny – harmonica, vocals
- Billy Rush – guitar, vocals
- Steve Becker – drums, vocals
- Gene Boccia – bass
- Rick Gazda – trumpet
- Joel Gramolini – guitar, vocals
- Lisa Lowell - vocals
- Patti Scialfa - vocals
- Soozie Kirschner - vocals
- Kevin Kavanaugh – keyboards, vocals
- Eddie Manion – tenor saxophone
- Richie Rosenberg – trombone, vocals
- Michael Spengler – trumpet
- Joey Stann – baritone saxophone, tenor saxophone

=== Production ===
- Stephan Galfas – producer
- Johnny Lyon – producer

Recorded by David Hewitt on the Record Plant Black Truck
