= Cats on a Smooth Surface =

American rock group

- Origin: New Jersey, USA
- Genres: Rock
- Years active: 1978 to present
- Label: unsigned
- Members: Vincent Daniele; Peter Schulle; Buck Kelly; Paul Riccio; Evelyn Riccio
- Past members: Bobby Bandiera; Glen Burtnick; Garry Grant; Harry Filkin; Hans Peter Schulle; Mike Bovenzi; Peter Gagen; John Micco; Joel Krauss

Cats on a Smooth Surface is an American rock group was the house band at The Stone Pony in Asbury Park, New Jersey starting in 1978 and continuing throughout the 1980s.

In the years 1981 and 1982, the band's lineup consisted of Bobby Bandiera on lead guitar and vocals, Harry Filkin on rhythm guitar and vocals, Peter Schulle on keyboards and vocals, John Micco on bass guitar and vocals, Pete Gagen on drums, and Ray Plante on saxophone. Other band members through the years have included Glen Burtnick, Garry Grant, Vincent Danielle, and Mike Bovenzi, Steff "Stiff Reed" Munter, Rich Ruggiero and Joel Krausse. The band is still in existence and performs regularly in New Jersey. In 1971, prior to founding "Cats", Harry Filkin and Bobby Bandiera were the key players in the Jersey shore band called Holme in Belmar NJ. Harry still plays as current member of Holme and with "Harry and Billy". Bobby Bandiera is now a 5-year member of the internationally famous Bon Jovi band as a vocalist and guitarist. He was also lead guitar with Southside Johnny and the Asbury Jukes and still makes occasional appearances with them.

Starting in the spring of 1982 Bruce Springsteen often performed with the band, particularly on Sunday nights when he would appear unannounced at the Stone Pony and jump up on stage with them. He often claimed to the press that they were his favorite band to jam with Recently Rachel Copeland has also begun to sing with the band.

== Discography ==
=== Albums ===
- Cats on a Smooth Surface (1992)
- Live 1982 With Bruce Springsteen: The Legendary Radio Broadcast (2018)

=== Singles ===
- "Mean Streets" / "No Right Time (To Say Goodbye)" (1988)
- "Midnight Romeo" / "What Do All the People Know" (1992)
