= Holme (band) =

American rock band

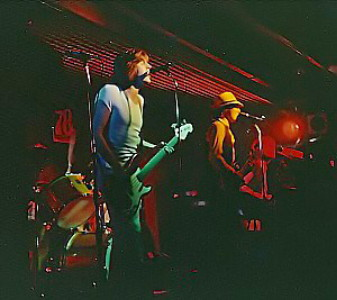
- Holme playing at the Royal Manor South in Wall, NJ in 1977

Background information
- Origin: West Orange, New Jersey, U.S.
- Genres: Pop rock; Rock; Alternative rock; Dance-rock
- Years active: 1970–present
- Label: Thin Ice
- Members: Bobby Bandiera (vocals, guitar); Billy Coleman (guitar, vocals); Kip Conner (lead vocals, bass); Frank "Puggy" DeRosa (vocals, guitar); Harry Filkin (vocals, guitar); Danny Gralick (vocals, keyboards); Joel Krauss (vocals, guitar); Tom Labella (saxophone); Mark Mazur (vocals, guitar); Billy Morris (guitar, vocals); Mike Peccatiello (guitar, vocals); Marc Ribler (guitar, vocals); Vinnie Santoro (keyboards); Peter Schulle (keyboard); Frank Sementa (drums)
- Website: Official Holme Website

Holme is a popular pop-rock band from West Orange, New Jersey, that played the New Jersey dance/rock club scene in the 1970s and 1980s. The band describes itself as a "mainstream" rock band and has been described as a "legendary bar band" and "legendary Shore party band."

Although the members' musical influences vary, most credit the Beatles as an important musical influence. Frank Sementa (drums), was influenced by watching Arthur Godfrey's TV show and listening to his parents' Glenn Miller and McGuire Sisters records. Keyboardist Danny Gralick, from Belmar and Philadelphia, who had played for Jim Croce for a time, was inspired by Buddy Greco. Guitarist Joel Krauss, who was from Brooklyn, originally played the French Horn, but switched to guitar because it was more popular with his peers. Krauss was a cab driver when he saw the ad for a guitarist. Krauss later quit the band for a while, but rejoined the band later.

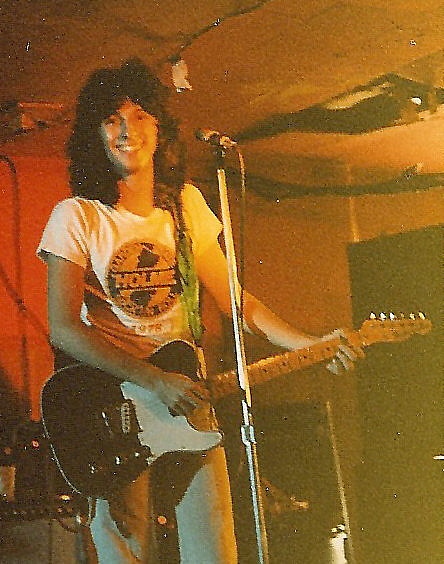
Bobby Bandiera playing with Holme in 1978, wearing T-shirt with band's logo.

Bobby Bandiera, who is also from Orange, NJ, and was already playing guitar nearly every night at the Jersey Shore, dropped out of school (but earned his GED) to join Holme when he was only 16 years old. He was soon making more money than his parents combined. Bandiera later joined Cats on a Smooth Surface, the Stone Pony's popular house band, which was founded by former Holme members Joel Krauss (father of Alexis Krauss, front women for Sleigh Bells) and Harry Filkin. Cats' other members included Glen Burtnick (who later joined Styx), Fran Smith (later in The Hooters), and Ray Andersen (who joined Meat Loaf). In addition, Springsteen sometimes jammed with Cats. Bandiera went on to play with Southside Johnny and Bon Jovi.

In its heyday, Holme would often play six nights a week at the Jersey Shore and in North Jersey. Venues played included major popular clubs such as D'Jais, Art Stock's Royal Manor (North and South), Jimmy Byrne's Sea Girt Inn, The Headliner, and the Stone Pony at the shore, and Mother's, Dodd's, the Soap Factory, and the Towpath up north. Back in the 1970s, playing the suburban rock club circuit was steady work and lucrative.

Primarily popular as a cover band, the band produced several singles, including the "Garden State Parkway Boogie" by band member Mark Mazur. The song was inspired by the fact that although they lived in Manasquan, the band often played in North Jersey. Similarly, most of their following, who lived in North Jersey, would drive to the shore to see them in the summer. They realized that they or their following was driving on the Parkway almost every night, and decided to write a song about it." The song is still a favorite among followers. They also designed their logo to look like the Parkway signs after checking to see if the New Jersey Highway Authority had any objections.

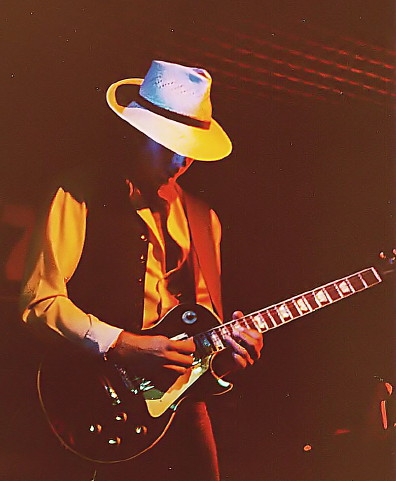
Mark Mazur playing with Holme in 1977.

For a while the band spent time visiting radio stations to promote their singles, recording demonstration tapes, and talking to record companies. In the early days, Danny Gralick, Mark Mazur, and Bobby Bandiera composed some songs individually and together. Mazur's brother Bret Mazur (not to be confused with Bret Epic Mazur) is also a songwriter and co-wrote the Brecker Brothers song "East River." Mazur eventually left to start his own band, Mark Mazur and the Targets, that included Mark Mesaros on bass, Dennis Diken on drums, and Dave Cogswell on keyboards. Mesaros and Diken later joined Pat DiNizio to form The Smithereens.

Holme had hoped to someday enjoy the success achieved by artists like Fleetwood Mac and Steve Miller. Conner told a reporter, "Artists like that pretty much call their own shots. When their contracts run their course, they can negotiate their new ones. The idea is to make six albums and in five years be in the same commanding position recording-wise that we have in the nightclubs right now." In the meantime, they formed a publishing company, "Shore Shot", and a record label, "Thin Ice." Although the elusive big contract did not materialize, Holme was immensely popular in New Jersey in the 1970s and 1980s. As of 2016, Holme was playing Monday nights at D'Jais (which Sementa and Conner, along with Holme's former manager, Bill Luddecke, have owned since 1979) in the summer, as well as at other events off season.

== Discography ==
Singles

- The Garden State Parkway Boogie (Mazur) / Ivy (Gralick) (1977)
- Feel This Record (Gralick/Mazur) / That's All Right Mama (Bandiera) (1978)
- Just a Matter of Time (Mazur/Ritchings) / Weekend (Ritchings/Mazur) (1981)

EPS

- Just a Matter of Time (1982)
