= Joey Stann =

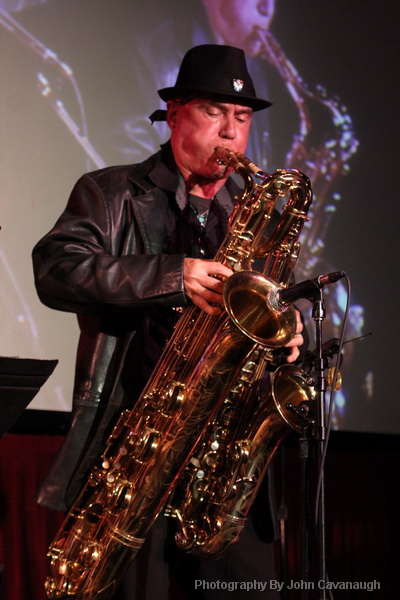
- Joey Stann performing at Gary U.S. Bonds birthday bash at BB Kings in NYC

Background information
- Origin: New York, United States
- Genres: Rock and roll, Pop rock
- Occupation(s): Musician, songwriter
- Instrument(s): Tenor saxophone, Baritone saxophone, Alto saxophone, Vocals, Keyboards
- Years active: 1975 – current

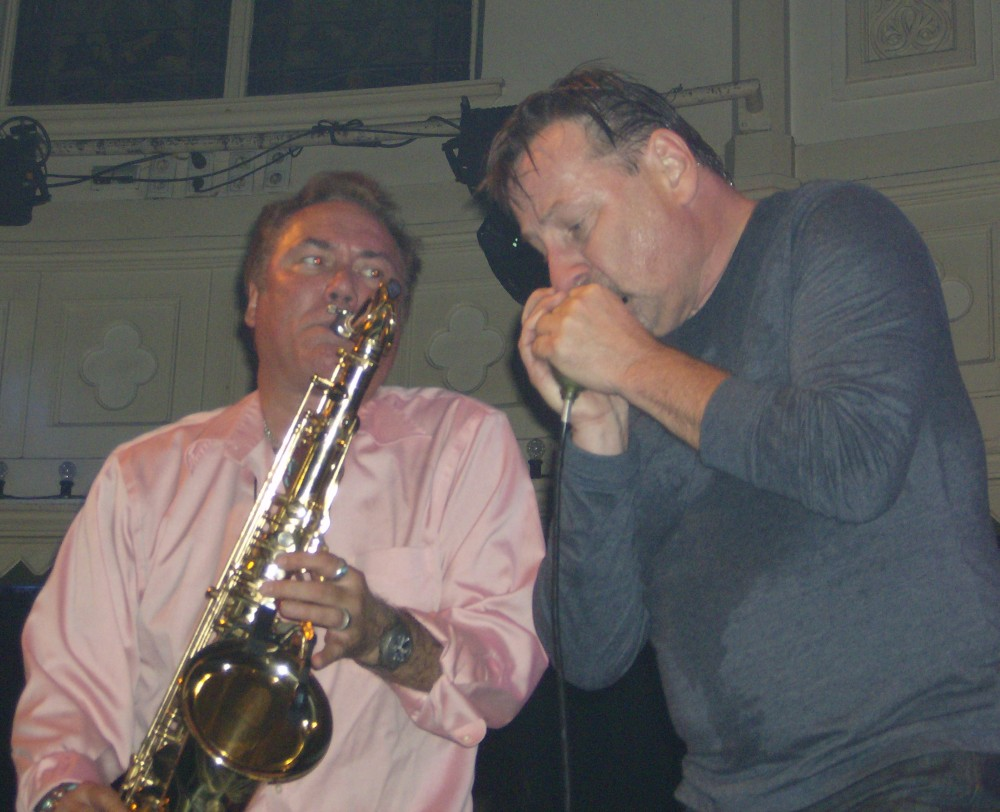
Joey Stann performing with Southside Johnny in 2007

Joey Stann is an accomplished saxophonist who has worked as a sideman and has recorded with a long list of rock and roll luminaries. Stann performs primarily on the tenor, Alto saxophone and baritone saxophone and has contributed vocals and has played and recorded the Hammond organ and piano on stage and in studios. A New York native, he is recognized for his lifelong association with Southside Johnny & The Asbury Jukes. Stann originally joined the band in 1980. He left to play with Gary U.S. Bonds from 1981 to 1985 before rejoining Southside Johnny. He currently freelances with other bands.

Also Joseph "Holistic Life Master" is an Integrative Energy Healer, Shaman, Reiki Master, Certified Clinical Hypnotherapist, Intuitive, Teacher, and Paranormal Investigator. Joseph’s interest in Holistic Healing began in the late 1960s, is organic, and was born out of personal experiences. At age 12, he had suffered a heart attack as a result of a cardiac birth defect. Several years later, early in his career as a professional musician, he began to experience painful arthritis which threatened his ability to perform, as well as making the rigors of touring more difficult. After unsuccessful attempts with traditional medicine, Joseph turned to Holistic Healing and successfully healed both his arthritis as well as his heart condition.

== Discography ==
- Southside Johnny & the Asbury Jukes, Into The Harbour (2005) – Saxophone
- Gary U.S. Bonds, Back In 20 (2004) – Saxophone
- Southside Johnny & the Asbury Jukes, Going To Jukesville (2002) – Saxophone
- Joey Stann, Family Tree (2001) – Saxophone
- Gary U.S. Bonds, King Biscuit Flower Hour Presents... (2001) – Saxophone
- The Other 99, At the Eleventh Hour (2000) – Saxophone
- Various Artists, One Step Up/Two Steps Back (1997) – Saxophone, Backing Vocals
- Southside Johnny & the Asbury Jukes, All I Want Is Everything: The Best of 1979 – 1991 (1993) Synthesizer, Saxophone, Vocals
- Southside Johnny & the Asbury Jukes, Better Days (1991) Sax (Tenor), Backing Vocals
- SOS Allstars, Greetings from New York (1989) – Sax (Baritone)
- Southside Johnny & the Jukes, At Least We Got Shoes (1986) – Sax (Baritone and Tenor)
- Neil Sedaka, Come See About Me (1984) – Sax (Tenor)
- The Stompers, One Heart for Sale (1984) – Saxophone
- Gary U.S. Bonds, On the Line (1982) – Saxophone, Vocals
- Southside Johnny & the Asbury Jukes, Reach Up & Touch the Sky: Live (1981) – Sax (Baritone and Tenor)
- Gary U.S. Bonds, Dedication (1981) – Sax (Baritone), Vocals
- Benny Mardones, Thank God for Girls (1978) – Saxophone
- Werewolves, Werewolves (1978) – Horn
- Stephen Dees, Hip Shot (1977) – Sax (Baritone)
- Aerosmith, Toys in the Attic (1975) – Sax (Baritone)
- Steve Satten, Whatcha Gonna Do for Me? (1975) – Sax (Baritone)
- Gary U.S. Bonds, "Christmas is ON!(Gary U.S.Bonds album)" (2012) -Saxophone
