= John Micco =

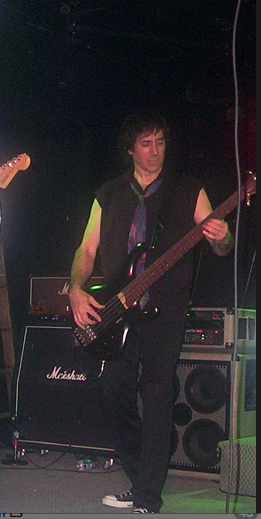
- John Micco in 2012

Background information
- Also known as: Micco
- Occupations: Musician, writer
- Instruments: Bass guitar, vocals
- Website: www.johnmicco.com

John Micco, aka Micco, is an American bass player, back-up vocalist, and songwriter.

Micco is best known as a member of the alternative rock band Crush from 1991 to 1993. Crush also included Paul Ferguson from the British post-punk/industrial group Killing Joke, John Carruthers from the British rock bands Siouxsie and the Banshees and Clock DVA, and NJ's Fred Schreck from The Ancients. They were signed to Atlantic Records where they recorded their eponymous first album Crush . This album was recorded in Wales and produced by Pat Moran (Robert Plant, Iggy Pop, Edie Brickell and the New Bohemians).

Micco's other major releases include Lloyd Cole's "Bad Vibes" produced by Adam Peters and mixed by Bob Clearmountain in 1993 and Robert Becker's "Shakeup" in 2001.

From 1995 to 2001, Micco was the house bassist/vocalist for the Brooklyn, N.Y. based indie label, Catatonic Records.

Micco was a member of Cats on a Smooth Surface, the house band at The Stone Pony in Asbury Park, NJ from 1981 to 1983. Bruce Springsteen would regularly jam with Cats at the Stone Pony on Sunday nights, and other top area musicians would sit in as well.

Notably, Micco has worked with Grammy award-winning engineer/producer Andy Wallace on several unreleased projects. He has also enjoyed recording and touring with artists: Joe Lynn Turner (Rainbow, Deep Purple) and Gary Corbett (Cinderella) as well as jamming with the following artists: Reeves Gabrels (Tin Machine, David Bowie), Clarence Clemons, and Eric Carr (KISS), and members from the following bands: Iron Maiden, Blue Öyster Cult, Asbury Jukes, and The News (The Huey Lewis band circa 1980s). His bands have opened for Chicago, Bryan Adams, The Go Go's and Twisted Sister.

In December 2013 one of his original bands, The Darrens played at Irving Plaza, opening up for Mark McGrath and his band Sugar Ray.

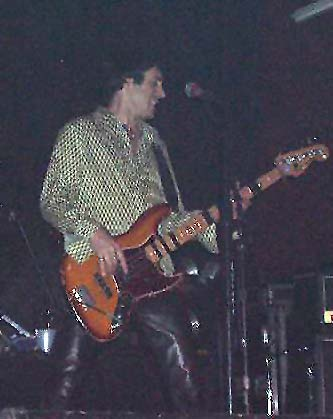
John Micco in 2011

== Discography ==
Year	Artist	Album
1993	Crush	Crush
1993	Lloyd Cole	Bad Vibes
2001	Robert Becker	Shakeup
