= Slow Dance (Southside Johnny album) =

Studio album by Southside Johnny
- Released: 1988
- Recorded: February–March 1988
- Studio: Nervous Music, Manhattan; House of Music, West Orange, NJ
- Genre: Soul, easy listening
- Label: Cypress
- Producer: John Lyon, Steve Skinner

Southside Johnny chronology
At Least We Got Shoes (1986)	Slow Dance (1988)	Better Days (1991)

Singles from Slow Dance
- 1. "Ain't That Peculiar" Released: 1988; 2. "On the Air Tonight" Released: 1989 (UK)

Slow Dance is an album by the American musician Southside Johnny, released in 1988. It was marketed as a solo endeavor, although a few Asbury Jukes played on the album.

The album peaked at No. 198 on the Billboard 200. The cover of "Ain't That Peculiar" was a minor radio hit. Southside Johnny promoted the album by again touring with the Asbury Jukes.

== Production ==
The album was recorded during a six-month period between Asbury Jukes commitments. Southside Johnny wrote five of its 10 songs; he wanted to focus more on his lyrics than he had in the past.

Bruce Springsteen contributed to "Walking Through Midnight", which was written in part in 1978. The Uptown Horns performed on a few songs. "Little Calcutta" was inspired by the plight of the homeless people who resided at the Port Authority Bus Terminal.

== Critical reception ==
Professional ratings
Review scores
Source	Rating
AllMusic	3/5 stars
The Encyclopedia of Popular Music	3/5 stars
The Record	2/4 stars
The Rolling Stone Album Guide	3/5 stars

The Globe and Mail wrote that "it's pleasant enough—Lyons has a smoky, soulful voice and writes a pretty fair song—but the production has rounded all the edges off the songs." The Orlando Sentinel deemed the album "an exceptional collection that combines the sheen of modern production techniques, eschewed by the Jukes, with the old-fashioned power of Lyon's heartfelt vocals." The Toronto Star labeled the album "pleasant" and "serviceable," but noted that Southside Johnny's "not quite special enough; his experience somehow works against him... He doesn't quite grab our attention."

The Ottawa Citizen determined that "Lyon can make soul ballads as powerful and assertive as an army of tough-slinging guitar players." The Kingston Whig-Standard opined that, "once again, without horns and their natural bluster, Southside Johnny sounds forced and, well, phony." The Record considered Slow Dance a "pleasant little album that will probably win him some new fans in the easy-listening ranks."

AllMusic called the album "a noble, but failed, experiment," writing that it was an "attempt is to take Southside out of the bar band, R&B, horn-filled Jukes style, and put him with contemporary synthesizer sounds and programmed drums."

== Track listing ==
No.	Title	Length
1.	"On the Air"
2.	"Sirens of the Night"
3.	"Ain't That Peculiar"
4.	"Little Calcutta"
5.	"Act of Love"
6.	"Slow Dance"
7.	"Your Precious Love"
8.	"No Secret"
9.	"When the Moment Is Right"
10.	"Walking Through Midnight"
