= Walk Like a Man (The Sopranos) =

- The Sopranos episode
- Episode no.: Season 6 Episode 17
- Directed by: Terence Winter
- Written by: Terence Winter
- Cinematography by: Phil Abraham
- Production code: 617
- Original air date: May 6, 2007
- Running time: 55 minutes

Episode chronology
← Previous "Chasing It"	Next → "Kennedy and Heidi"
- The Sopranos season 6

"Walk Like a Man" is the 82nd episode of the HBO television series The Sopranos, the fifth episode of the second half of the show's sixth season, and the 17th episode of the season overall. The episode centers around a power struggle between Christopher Moltisanti and Paulie Gualtieri, while Tony and Carmela Soprano attempt to help A.J. through a depression bout.

Written and directed by executive producer Terence Winter in his directorial debut, it originally aired on May 6, 2007. Leading the U.S. cable television ratings for the week, the episode was watched by 7.16 million viewers upon its premiere. Critics praised the character development, acting, and directing.

== Starring ==
- James Gandolfini as Tony Soprano
- Lorraine Bracco as Dr. Jennifer Melfi
- Edie Falco as Carmela Soprano
- Michael Imperioli as Christopher Moltisanti
- Dominic Chianese as Corrado Soprano, Jr.*
- Steven Van Zandt as Silvio Dante
- Tony Sirico as Paulie Gualtieri
- Robert Iler as Anthony Soprano, Jr.
- Jamie-Lynn Sigler as Meadow Soprano
- Aida Turturro as Janice Soprano Baccalieri
- Steve Schirripa as Bobby Baccalieri
- Dan Grimaldi as Patsy Parisi
- Carl Capotorto as Little Paulie Germani

* = credit only

=== Guest starring ===
- Tim Daly as J.T. Dolan
- Max Casella as Benny Fazio
- Cara Buono as Kelli Moltisanti
- Michael Countryman as Dr. Richard Vogel
- Michael Drayer as Jason Parisi
- Arthur J. Nascarella as Carlo Gervasi
- Dennis Paladino as Al Lombardo
- Joseph Perrino as Jason Gervasi
- Dania Ramirez as Blanca Selgado
- Matt Sauerhoff as Victor Mineo
- Matt Servitto as Agent Dwight Harris
- Danielle Di Vecchio as Barbara Soprano Giglione
- Michael Kelly as Agent Ron Goddard
- Greg Connolly as Stan
- Nolan Carley as Mike
- Frank Santorelli as Georgie
- Marianne Leone as Joanne Moltisanti
- Anthony J. Ribustello as Dante Greco
- John Cenatiempo as Anthony Maffei
- Frank John Hughes as Walden Belfiore
- William DeMeo as Jason Molinaro
- Mando Alvarado as Felix
- Ed Vassallo as Tom Giglione
- Lawrence Bingham as Construction Worker
- Madison Connolly as Alyssa Giglione
- Anthony Piccolo as Thomas "Tommy" Giglione, Jr.

== Synopsis ==
A.J. struggles with depression after his breakup with Blanca. He quits his job at the pizzeria, sulks around the house, and makes comments suggesting thoughts of suicide. Carmela persuades him to start therapy. Tony tells Dr. Melfi he was going to permanently quit therapy but decided against it in light of A.J.'s problems. He laments that his son has inherited his "rotten fucking putrid genes".

Tony persuades A.J. to attend a party at the Bada Bing with "the two Jasons" – Jason Gervasi and Jason Parisi. Carmela is angry at first, but is later satisfied to see that A.J. is socializing again. He begins to associate with a profitable sports betting business they are running at school. At a frat party, they use A.J.'s SUV to take a kid who owes them money into the woods. They pour sulfuric acid on his toes while A.J. helps hold him down.

Tony speaks to FBI Agents Harris and Goddard about Ahmed and Muhammad, who have stopped visiting the Bada Bing, and gives them the cellphone number one of them had used.

Christopher and Paulie are selling stolen power tools in a hardware store belonging to Christopher's father-in-law, and dividing the take. However, Christopher is seeing the other members of the crew less than before. At a barbecue that he and Kelli host, Tony tells him that his absence from Soprano family gatherings could be seen as a lack of commitment; Christopher reminds him that he is avoiding such meetings to keep his sobriety, as there is always alcohol around. He tells Tony that his father, Dickie Moltisanti, wasn't much more than "a fucking junkie."

Paulie sends Little Paulie and Jason Molinaro to break into the hardware store and steal some items, which they sell to Paulie's Cuban contacts in Miami. Christopher confronts Paulie and demands compensation; Paulie crudely rebuffs him. Tony brushes off Christopher's complaints. Christopher finds himself increasingly sidelined in the family, with Bobby apparently taking his position in Tony's inner circle. When Little Paulie steals again from the hardware store, Christopher tracks him down and throws him out of a second-floor window. He survives, but with six broken vertebrae. Paulie then vandalizes Christopher's landscaped front garden with his Cadillac CTS.

Tony makes peace between Christopher and Paulie, and the money situation is worked out. The two reconcile their differences at the Bing, where Christopher drinks with Paulie to mark the occasion. Christopher gets drunk and rambles affectionately about his daughter, causing Paulie to make some off-color jokes. Christopher thinks everyone is laughing at him, Tony most of all, and abruptly leaves. He goes straight to J.T.'s apartment, but J.T. cannot help him much as he is no longer Christopher's sponsor, he has work to do, and it is dangerous for him to hear the things Christopher starts to tell him. Rebuffing him, he says, "You're in the Mafia." After a few seconds, Christopher quietly says, "Fine," and begins to walk away, before turning around and killing J.T. with a shot to the head.

== First appearances ==
- Jason Parisi: son of Patsy Parisi and a friend of A.J. Soprano and Jason Gervasi. He attends Rutgers University and is part of a small-time crew that runs sports book operations at his college. He and Jason Gervasi are known as "The Jasons".
- Walden Belfiore: soldier in the Gervasi crew, seen at the Bada Bing! with the other mobsters.
- Dr. Richard Vogel: A.J.'s psychiatrist

== Deceased ==
- "J.T." Dolan: murdered by Christopher Moltisanti, after refusing to listen to his story about the Mafia.

== Title Reference ==
"Walk Like a Man" is a song by the Four Seasons, an American band from Newark, New Jersey. The song is about a young man who is experiencing a painful breakup with his girlfriend and is told by his father to "walk like a man", meaning he should forget about her and move on with his life.

== Production ==
- Carl Capotorto (Little Paulie Germani) is promoted to the main cast and billed in the opening credits but only for this episode.
- "Walk Like a Man" is the directorial debut of Terence Winter, a Sopranos writer and producer since the second season, who also wrote this episode. Winter, along with creator David Chase is one of only two screenwriters on the show to have both written and directed a single episode at the same time.
- Georgie the bartender of Bada Bing! returns in this episode for a brief final appearance, despite having been severely abused by Tony in "Cold Cuts", which led to Georgie's resignation, and his insistence for Tony to stay away from him. He was apparently later reasoned with and convinced to come back after a pay-off from Tony.
- The scene where Christopher observes mobsters laughing in slow-motion and looks for Tony's reaction, in particular, is similar to the scene from "All Happy Families..." where Tony observes the slowly laughing Mafiosi and gives most attention to Feech La Manna's reaction. Both Tony and Christopher seem to look for how these important people genuinely value them in the difficult-to-fake situation of immediate laughter.

== Music ==
- Tony sings a few lines from "Comfortably Numb" by Pink Floyd as he descends the stairs at the start of the episode.
- "White Flag" by Dido is playing at the pizza parlor when A.J. watches a couple kissing and breaks down in tears.
- The song playing while Tony is flirting with a stripper at the Bada Bing! is "Emma" by Hot Chocolate.
- While Jason Parisi is talking to Tony at the Bada Bing!, "Body Burn" by Cubanate and "Supermassive Black Hole" by Muse are played.
- The song played at the first frat party is "Salt Shaker" by Ying Yang Twins featuring Lil Jon and the East Side Boyz.
- The song playing at the party when Jason Parisi tells AJ about the financial benefits to be had taking sports bets from fellow students, and as a stripper offers AJ a lapdance (which he accepts, albeit with a marked lack of enthusiasm) is "Y.U.H.2.B.M.2" by Whitey.
- The song playing in the VIP room of the Bing when Christopher reconciles with Paulie is "Mood Indigo", performed by Keely Smith.
- The song played at the second frat party is "Hand On the Pump" by Cypress Hill.
- As Christopher exits the bar, El Michels Affair's version of Isaac Hayes' cover of "Walk On By" can be heard playing.
- Tony is listening to "Tom Sawyer" by Rush, as he arrives home from the bar.
- The song played over the end credits is "The Valley" by Los Lobos.

== Reception ==
On its premiere, "Walk Like a Man" had 7.16 million viewers, leading the Nielsen cable television ratings for the week ending May 6.

Television Without Pity graded the episode with an A−. Reviewer Kim Reed called A.J.'s attempt to reconcile with Blanca "pathetic" and Tim Daly's final scene "memorable". Lisa Schwarzbaum offered a different view regarding A.J.'s subplot, writing in Entertainment Weekly that A.J. showed "a rare, brave, direct, fully felt expression of emotion and need". IGN rated the episode 8.3 points out of 10, with Brian Zoromski noting that A.J. and Christopher confronted "the demons that their fathers struggled with" and Christopher showed "his best and...absolute worst". TV Squad rated the episode six points out of seven, with Tom Biro noting "how tense the discussions have become between doctor and patient" at Tony's therapy session with Dr. Melfi.

For the Los Angeles Times, Paul Brownfield noted the character development: "...Tony’s lieutenants have all produced junior scumbags and thugs, whereas A.J. will just get blown into the life while going about in pity for himself." Star-Ledger critic Alan Sepinwall found similarities with earlier episode "Remember When" for "parallel narratives about Tony's biological son (A.J.) and the person he's always treated like a son (Chris)" and praised Terence Winter's directing "the best therapy scene in a long time" between Tony and Dr. Melfi. Matt Zoller Seitz found the episode to have "one of the most complicated structures" of the series.
