= Kazee =

Kazee is a surname. Notable people with the surname include:

- Buell Kazee (1900–1976), American country and folk singer
- Damontae Kazee (born 1993), American football player
- Jeff Kazee, American musician and songwriter
- Steve Kazee (born 1975), American actor and singer
