= Jeff Kazee =

Rock and soul keyboardist

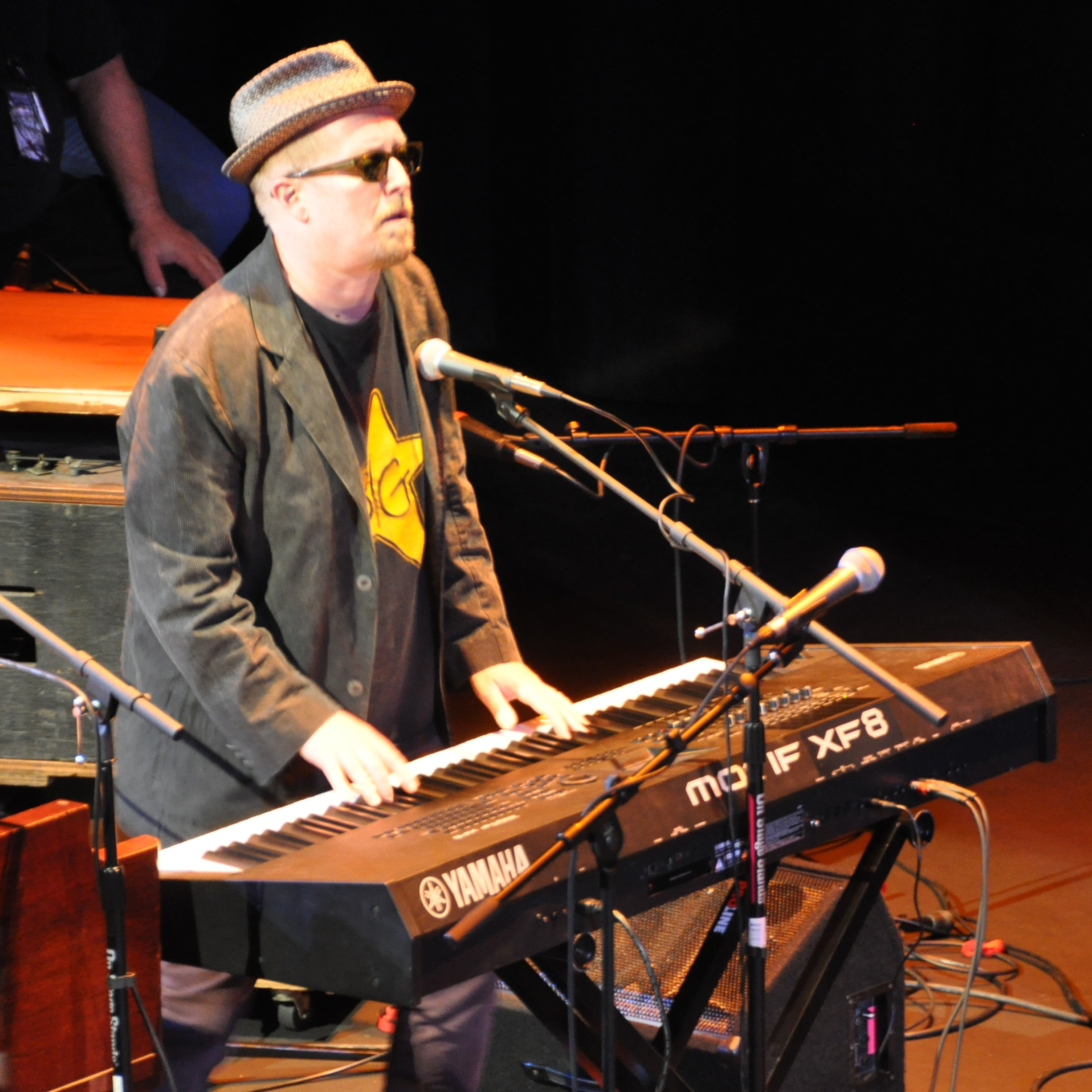
Kazee with Southside Johnny in 2013

Jeff Kazee is an American pianist, vocalist, songwriter and Hammond B3 organist for the Rock/Soul band Southside Johnny and the Asbury Jukes. He has also worked with Bon Jovi and with Jon Bon Jovi in his solo career.

Kazee hosts a concert series at The Cutting Room in New York City under the name of kazeedigs—featuring shows dedicated to the songs "in heavy rotation on Jeff Kazee's turntable, 8-track player, and iPod". The first two shows were titled Greats Of The 88's and Soulsville, NYC: Stax Rides The Subway. The shows featured such NYC-based artists as: John Conte, Rich Pagano, G.E. Smith, Southside Johnny, Craig Dreyer, Neal Pawley, Jack Morer, Shawn Pelton, Jeffrey Lee Campbell, Tony Tino, Chris Anderson, Art Hays, Christine Ohlman, and Billy Joel saxman Mark Rivera.

Kazee released the album No River in 1998.

== Family ==
Kazee was raised in Lima, Ohio, and is married with two daughters, Vassileia and Sophia. He resides in New York City, NY.

His great-uncle was the early country and folk singer Buell Kazee.

== Collaborations ==
A few of the many artists that Kazee has worked with include: Southside Johnny, Bon Jovi, Chocolate Genius, Dar Williams, The Blues Brothers, G.E. Smith, Gavin DeGraw. He occasionally filled in for bandleader Paul Shaffer on the Late Show with David Letterman. Kazee's presence as a keyboardist/vocalist/arranger has been seen and heard in "house bands" for many special events, backing such stars as James Taylor, The Band's Levon Helm, Bruce Springsteen, John Mayer and Snoop Dogg, among others.

He has performed on The Tonight Show with Jay Leno, The Today Show, Late Night with Conan O'Brien, Oprah, VH1, Larry King Live, CBS This Morning, Austin City Limits, MTV Unplugged and many other talk/music shows, award shows and specials.

In 2008-09, Kazee wrote and produced the theme song for the Garden Of Dreams Foundation (Madison Square Garden's charitable arm). Kazee shared the lead vocals with Robert Randolph on the original composition Give Some More, which is featured every night at each New York Knicks, Rangers and Lady Liberty home games at The Garden in New York City.

In 2009, Jeff joined Fab Faux drummer Rich Pagano and Asbury Juke bassist John Conte in an ongoing side project performing music selected from Elton John's Trio Years ('70-'72), entitled Early Elton.

In 2010, Southside Johnny and the Asbury Jukes released Pills and Ammo with most of the songs co-written by John Lyon and Jeff Kazee.

In 2010, Kazee, under the name of Kazeedigs, performed two shows celebrating the re-issue of the Rolling Stones' Exile on Main Street. The first performance was held at the Stone Pony in Asbury Park, New Jersey (Exile on Ocean Avenue) and again in New York City at The Canal Room (Exile on Canal Street) Among others joining Kazee onstage was Southside Johnny.

In February 2013, with (Southside) John Lyon, Kazee wrote and produced the debut album of Southside Johnny and The Poor Fools, Songs From The Barn.

In 2015, he again cowrote and produced another album Soultime!, with John Lyon, this time under the name of Southside Johnny and the Asbury Jukes.

== Bon Jovi ==
Kazee toured with Bon Jovi in 2003 during This Left Feels Right Live session and the Have a Nice Day Tour from 2005 until 2006.

In July 2010, Kazee and other members of the Asbury Jukes joined Bon Jovi onstage at Blossom Music Center (Cleveland) for a performance of the song "Treat Her Right."

Kazee filled in for David Bryan on keyboards and vocals for night five of Bon Jovi's 2010 London O2 Arena residency as Bryan was attending The Tony Awards in NYC.
