= Crush (rock band) =

American alternative rock band

- Also known as: Pleasurehead
- Genre: Alternative rock
- Years active: 1990–1993
- Labels: East West, Island
- Past members: Michael Bramon; John Valentine Carruthers; Paul Ferguson; John Micco; Frederick Schreck

Crush was an alternative rock band with East West Records from 1991 to 1993. Original members included singer-songwriter Michael Bramon, English guitarist-songwriter John Valentine Carruthers (formerly of Siouxsie and the Banshees), English drummer-songwriter Paul Ferguson (formerly of Killing Joke), and American bassist/backing vocalist/songwriter John Micco.

Crush was previously known as Pleasurehead on Island Records from 1990-1991. During this time, with producer Mark Opitz, they recorded an (unreleased) album at Electric Lady Studios with bassist Robert Burke Warren. Warren would leave before the album's completion. Bramon left Crush shortly before their 1993 release Crush, and was replaced by singer Frederick Schreck whose lead vocals would appear on the record. Bramon went on to work with guitarist-songwriter Tony "Bruno" Rey. Ferguson joined his former drum roadie, Alex Paterson of the Orb.
