= D'Jais =

Venue in New Jersey, United States

Coordinates: 40.170347°N 74.016308°W

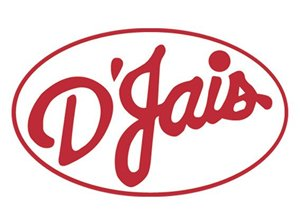
- Interactive map of D'Jais
- Location: 1801–1805 Ocean Ave, Belmar, New Jersey
- Owner: Frank Sementa, Bill Luddecke, and Kip Conner
- Type: Restaurant, Dance club, Music venue
- Events: Electronic dance music, electronic, rock, trance

Construction
- Opened: 1959
- Renovated: 1979

Website
- www.djais.com

D'Jais Bar & Grill is a popular dance club and restaurant in Belmar, New Jersey, United States. It has been called a landmark, "infamous", and one of the most famous bars along the Jersey Shore.

== Location and Name ==
D'Jais Bar & Grill is located at 1801-1805 Ocean Avenue, a street which runs north and south along the Belmar coastline. It is on the west side of the street, and the front entrance faces the beach and boardwalk. According to Frank Sementa, who has been the owner since 1979, the name "D'Jais" comes from the childhood nickname of the first owner of the club, Dominick Joseph DiSalvo, who was called "DJ".

== History ==
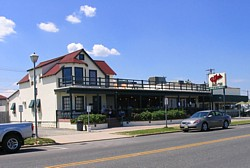
Southern view from the ocean side.

D'Jais was established in 1959. Locally, it has been called the most popular bar in town, and was busy from the start. D'Jais is still a popular spot and has been called a "Jersey shore institution for young people". During the 1970s, D'Jais was also regular spot for Bruce Springsteen, who also took part in softball games and picnics hosted by the establishment, as well as singer and guitarist Bobby Bandiera. During that era, it was considered "the most celebrated of the bars across from the boardwalk", and was popularized for offering five six-ounce pilsner glasses of beer for a dollar. Local bands also played at the venue during the 70s, including Holme, whose members included Bobby Bandiera, Frank Sementa, and Kip Conner. It was purchased by Sementa, Luddecke, and Conner in 1979. They converted it from a bar famous for its live bands and cheap beer to a trendy dance club with a DJ, theme nights, and a party atmosphere.

In 1984, Monmouth County officials adopted a uniform 2 am closing time to discourage patrons from driving to other towns to find bars open later; however in 1986, D'Jais began closing at 12 am. Around 1990, Sementa added the restaurant to the site. In 2005, a study was conducted at the request of neighboring residents by the ABC board to analyze the bars operations and occupancy levels. The residents believed patrons of D'Jais had violated Quality of Life conditions. Residents were cited as spotting multiple fights, as well as other disruptive behavior.

=== Restaurant and dance club ===
The appearance of D'Jais has changed since the 1970s. The outdoor portion of the restaurant is covered by rooftop, and provides patrons with oceanview seating. The interior features four full-sized bars, as well as one that sits upon the outside deck. During the summer, most nights D'Jais features a DJ and dance music. There are frequently theme nights and contests. On Monday nights in the summer, Holme, a New Jersey band whose popularity dates back to the 1970s, entertains the crowd.

== Notoriety ==
D'Jais is considered a landmark dance club and restaurant, and has been called many things, including "infamous" and "guido-central". D'Jais was named the best overall party spot and ranked 4th out of 100 in the 100 Best Bars at the Shore by Fun New Jersey. The club has attracted sports celebrities such as Kim Clijsters and Brian Lynch. Locally, it has been called the most popular bar in town, and a local hot spot.

== New Jersey Sand Castle Contest ==
D'Jais is the lead sponsor of the annual New Jersey Sand Castle contest at the 18th Avenue beach. This contest typically attracts over 350 entries and about 10,000 participants each year. D'Jais also participates in other local and regional charity events.

== See also ==
- New Jersey music venues by capacity

== Sources ==
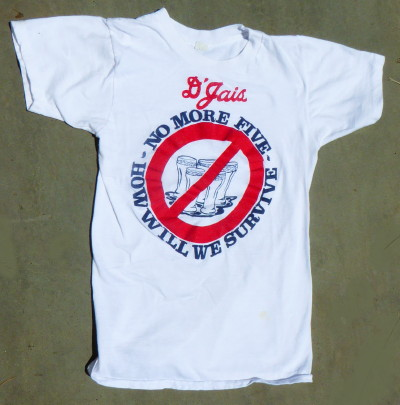
T-shirt from 1979 protesting the conversion of D'Jais from a beer joint with live music and 5 beers for $1, to a dance club.

- Ames, L. (7 May 1978). "The lively world of club circuit rock". The New York Times. p. NJ28.
- Africano, Lillian; Africano, Nina (2004). Insiders' Guide to the Jersey Shore (2 ed.). Globe Pequot. p. 72. ISBN 978-0-7627-3003-2.
- Blum, Bette (2007). Bradley Beach Treasures: Reflections of the Jersey Shore. The History Press. p. 36. ISBN 978-1-59629-299-4.
- The Borough of Belmar New Jersey. "Home movie of Belmar from the Summer of '59 Surfaces on YouTube". Belmar. Archived from the original on 21 November 2010 – via YouTube.
- Buckley, C. (3 June 2010). "Where the party is perpetual". The New York Times.
- Cowen, R. (2 September 2007). "Sun, sand, surf combine for a fine end to season". The Record, Bergen County, N.J. pp. 214–215.
- DeMasters, Karen (18 August 2002). "By the beach, a club and a club sandwich". The New York Times. pp. NJ12.
- Douglass College (1988). "New Jersey folklife". 13. American Studies Dept., Rutgers University: 44.
- Genovese, Peter (2007). New Jersey Curiosities: Quirky Characters, Roadside Oddities & Other Offbeat Stuff. Globe Pequot. pp. 250–251. ISBN 978-0-7627-4112-0.
- Lott, Kara (5 May 2005). "D'Jais bar put on notice by Belmar" (PDF). The Coast Star. Archived from the original (PDF) on 16 July 2011.
- Sandford, Christopher (1999). Springsteen: point blank. Da Capo Press. pp. 214–215. ISBN 978-0-306-80921-7.
