= Chasing It =

- The Sopranos episode
- Episode no.: Season 6 Episode 16
- Directed by: Tim Van Patten
- Written by: Matthew Weiner
- Cinematography by: Alik Sakharov
- Production code: 616
- Original air date: April 29, 2007
- Running time: 50 minutes

Episode chronology
← Previous "Remember When"	Next → "Walk Like a Man"
- The Sopranos season 6

"Chasing It" is the 81st episode of the HBO television series The Sopranos, the fourth episode of the second half of the show's sixth season, and the 16th episode of the season overall. The episode centers around Tony Soprano experiencing problems from multiple angles, from losing sports bets, owing Hesh Rabkin repayment on a loan, to intervening with Vito Spatafore Jr.'s behavior problems.

Written by executive producer Matthew Weiner and directed by Tim Van Patten, it originally aired on April 29, 2007, and was watched by 6.76 million viewers upon its premiere. Critical reception was generally positive.

== Starring ==
- James Gandolfini as Tony Soprano
- Lorraine Bracco as Dr. Jennifer Melfi
- Edie Falco as Carmela Soprano
- Michael Imperioli as Christopher Moltisanti
- Dominic Chianese as Corrado Soprano, Jr. *
- Steven Van Zandt as Silvio Dante
- Tony Sirico as Paulie Gualtieri
- Robert Iler as Anthony Soprano, Jr.
- Jamie-Lynn Sigler as Meadow Soprano
- Aida Turturro as Janice Soprano Baccalieri *
- Steven R. Schirripa as Bobby Baccalieri
- Frank Vincent as Phil Leotardo
- Dan Grimaldi as Patsy Parisi
- Max Casella as Benny Fazio

* = credit only

=== Guest starring ===
- Jerry Adler as Hesh Rabkin

==== Also guest starring ====
- Nancy Sinatra as herself
- Gregory Antonacci as Butch DeConcini
- Tom Aldredge as Hugh De Angelis
- Elizabeth Bracco as Marie Spatafore
- Arthur J. Nascarella as Carlo Gervasi
- Dania Ramirez as Blanca Selgado
- Suzanne Shepherd as Mary De Angelis
- Brandon Hannan as Vito Spatafore, Jr.
- Anthony J. Ribustello as Dante Greco
- Taleb Adlah as Ahmed
- Donnie Keshawarz as Muhammad
- John "Cha Cha" Ciarcia as Albie Cianflone
- Matthew Del Negro as Brian Cammarata
- Paulina Gerzon as Francesca Spatafore
- Geoffrey Cantor as Eli Kaplan
- Tracey Silver as Beth Kaplan
- Lanette Ware as Renata
- Joseph Perrino as Jason Gervasi
- John Cenatiempo as Anthony Maffei
- Mason Pettit as Ted Yacanelli
- Drew Wininger as Fan
- Kobi and Kadin George as Hector Selgado
- Heidi Dippold as Janine Cammarata
- Southside Johnny as himself

== Synopsis ==
Tony's losing streak in sports betting continues. When Hesh asks him about repayment of his previous $200,000 bridge loan, Tony pretends to have forgotten about it and offers to pay the vig. Hesh was not charging interest and is insulted that Tony treats the loan as a mere business transaction. Tony calls Hesh a "shylock" in front of his crew. Later, Hesh says to his son-in-law, "At what point is it cheaper for him to settle it another way?"

Carmela sells the spec house, with its sub-standard materials, to her cousin Brian Cammarata and his pregnant wife. She tells Tony that she has cleared $600,000, and he assumes that half the profit is his. Tony wants to bet it on a "sure thing", but Carmela refuses, and he yields to her. The "sure thing" wins, but he reveals to Carmela that he only had $10,000 to bet on it. This leads to an argument about money, during which he manhandles her, and she throws a Lladró figurine at him, breaking it. Later, the couple reconciles after Tony agrees to control his gambling. Carmela is worried about the many threats they are facing; Tony says he survived being shot: "Big picture-wise, I'm up, way up."

Vito's widow Marie asks Tony to help her son, Vito Jr., who has been acting out since his father's death. Marie requests $100,000 to move her family to Maine to start over; Tony is reluctant. Both he and Phil (Marie's second cousin) talk to Vito Jr., to no effect. When Vito Jr. is expelled for defecating in the school shower, Tony decides to pay for the relocation. However, he gambles away the $100,000 he had reserved for it. Instead, he offers to pay for Vito Jr. to be sent to a boot camp program in Idaho. He plays down Marie's worries about corporal punishment and says he will pay the $18,000 fee. Marie reluctantly accepts, and Vito Jr. is taken away against his will by the boot camp's staff, leaving his mother and sister in tears.

Driving by, Tony happens to notice Ahmed and Muhammad mingling with traditionally dressed Pakistanis and Arabs on a street.

A.J. proposes to Blanca, who reluctantly accepts, but she later breaks up with him.

Renata, Hesh's girlfriend, dies suddenly. He is grief-stricken. Tony visits him and speaks clichéd words of condolence. He presents a large paper bag, saying, "I brought your money."

== First appearance ==
- Jason Gervasi: Son of DiMeo capo Carlo Gervasi. He is seen greeting his father getting out of a car.
- Anthony Maffei: Soldier in Bobby's crew. He is seen at the casino and the pork store.

== Deceased ==
- Renata, girlfriend of Hesh Rabkin.

== Final appearances ==
"Chasing It" marks the final appearances in the series of these longtime recurring characters:

- Hesh Rabkin: Close associate of the Soprano/DiMeo crime family ever since the times of "Johnny Boy" Soprano.
- Hugh De Angelis and Mary De Angelis: The parents of Carmela Soprano.

== Production ==
- Max Casella (Benny Fazio) is promoted to the main cast of the series and billed in the opening credits but only for this episode.
- The character of Vito Spatafore Jr. was recast for this episode with Brandon Hannan replacing Frank Borrelli.
- John Cenatiempo, a stuntman on The Sopranos since its first season, joins the ranks of the show's actors as well, appearing as a mostly background Soprano crime family mobster character Anthony Maffei, beginning with this episode.
- This episode is unique in that it almost throughout its entirety employs the shaky camera style, with the exception of Dr. Melfi's scenes and scenes in Tony's car. The style may represent the episode's theme of Tony's feverish gambling and losing spree.
- The casino scenes were filmed at Atlantic City's Borgata Hotel and Casino.
- The headstone that Vito Jr. knocks over in the cemetery is for "David M. Hackel". Episode writer Matthew Weiner worked for David Hackel as a writer for the sitcom Becker.
- The harmonica player in Sinatra's band is Southside Johnny Lyon, an underground legend of New Jersey's music scene. He has worked extensively with Little Steven Van Zandt, who portrays the character of Silvio Dante. Van Zandt has written, produced and performed on four of Lyon's albums and was a founding member of his band, the Asbury Jukes, before leaving to join Bruce Springsteen's E Street Band. Both Springsteen and Van Zandt appear on the Asbury Jukes' Better Days album, on the song "It's Been a Long Time".
- The Tampa Bay-Buffalo football game being watched at the Bing that Tony loses money on is actually footage from the film The Replacements.

== Music ==
- Nancy Sinatra sings "Bossman", a track off her 2004 album Nancy Sinatra, to a gathering of the New York and New Jersey families celebrating Phil Leotardo becoming boss.
- The song played in the Bada Bing! when the football game is on TV is "Kernkraft 400" by Zombie Nation.
- The guitar instrumental "Cavatina" is playing in the restaurant when A.J. proposes to Blanca.
- The music A.J. listens to in his car, while driving to the Puerto Rican parade day, is "Rompe" by Daddy Yankee.
- The music heard in the background when Blanca breaks up with A.J. is an instrumental version of Ricky Martin's "Livin' La Vida Loca".
- Song playing when Tony is driving in the Escalade is Bill Doggett's "Honky Tonk."
- When Tony is in the back room of the Bing, talking to Silvio about Vito, Jr., "Peppermint Twist" (1961) is playing. It is by Joey Dee & The Starlighters (from New Jersey).
- The song played during the casino scene and over the end credits is "Goin' Down Slow" by Howlin' Wolf.

== Reception ==
The episode had 6.76 million viewers as estimated by Nielsen Media Research, about 90,000 fewer viewers than last week's episode. Television Without Pity graded the episode with a B. IGN graded it with 8.5 points out of 10, with Brian Zoromski finding it to be "grounded and well rounded" for showing "the truly ugly side of Tony Soprano". For Entertainment Weekly, Lisa Schwarzbaum found the Vito Jr. subplot to be an example of "love-hate struggle between fathers and sons that has always been one of The Sopranos' great themes."

Paul Brownfield of the Los Angeles Times found a lack of plot development in "Chasing It": "Five hours left and all we have so far is foreshadowing." Similarly, Alan Sepinwall noted in The Star-Ledger: "There may not be a lot of carnage (outside of Renata's peaceful passing, this was a completely bloodless hour), but doom is coming." For TV Squad, Tom Biro called this episode "the weakest" of the season, due to dialogue lacking plot relevancy.

George Vecsey commented about the episode plot in an essay for The New York Times: "Tony’s foray into gambling is a reminder that sports have a darker side than what innocents like me want to acknowledge."
