= Remember When (The Sopranos) =

- The Sopranos episode
- Episode no.: Season 6 Episode 15
- Directed by: Phil Abraham
- Written by: Terence Winter
- Cinematography by: Bill Coleman
- Production code: 615
- Original air date: April 22, 2007
- Running time: 58 minutes

Episode chronology
← Previous "Stage 5"	Next → "Chasing It"
- The Sopranos season 6

"Remember When" is the 80th episode of the HBO television series The Sopranos, the third episode of the second half of the show's sixth season, and the 15th episode of the season overall. In the episode, Tony Soprano and Paulie Gualtieri travel to Miami to elude an FBI investigation into Tony's first murder, while Junior Soprano encounters interpersonal conflicts while being mentally institutionalized.

Written by Terence Winter and directed by Phil Abraham, "Remember When" originally aired on April 22, 2007. and was watched by 6.85 million viewers on its premiere. Critical reception was generally positive, albeit with some criticisms of the writing. The episode was also an early role for Lin-Manuel Miranda, who discussed this role in a 2018 interview on Live with Kelly and Ryan.

== Starring ==
- James Gandolfini as Tony Soprano
- Lorraine Bracco as Dr. Jennifer Melfi *
- Edie Falco as Carmela Soprano
- Michael Imperioli as Christopher Moltisanti
- Dominic Chianese as Corrado Soprano, Jr.
- Steven Van Zandt as Silvio Dante
- Tony Sirico as Paulie Gualtieri
- Robert Iler as Anthony Soprano, Jr. *
- Jamie-Lynn Sigler as Meadow Soprano *
- Aida Turturro as Janice Soprano Baccalieri *
- Steven R. Schirripa as Bobby Baccalieri
- Frank Vincent as Phil Leotardo

* = credit only

=== Guest starring ===
- Jerry Adler as Hesh Rabkin

==== Also guest starring ====
- Vincent Pastore as "Big Pussy" Bonpensiero
- Ken Leung as Carter Chong
- Gregory Antonacci as Butch DeConcini
- Frank Albanese as Pat Blundetto
- Dan Conte as Faustino "Doc" Santoro
- Paul Herman as "Beansie" Gaeta
- Nashawn Kearse as Jameel
- Jen Araki as Anika
- Elizabeth Sung as Mrs. Chong
- Gaston Renaud as Ramon
- Herbert Rogers as Willie Overall
- Charles Morgan as Prof. Brian Lynch
- Stephen Singer as Dr. Mandl
- Serafin Falcon as Esteban
- Stink Fisher as Warren
- Joe Pucillo as Beppy Scerbo
- Donna Smythe as Gia Gaeta
- Joseph Adams as Larry
- Brian D. Coats as Itzhak
- Joseph Conti as "Doc" Santoro's bodyguard
- Kevin Kean Murphy as Ascot Man
- Joseph Siravo as "Johnny Boy" Soprano (photo)
- Rocco Sisto as Young Junior Soprano (photo)
- Lin-Manuel Miranda as Bellman

== Synopsis ==
The FBI recovers the body of bookie Willie Overall—Tony's first murder—based on information from Soprano family capo Larry Boy Barese. Tony and Paulie drive to Miami to lie low during the investigation. On the way down, Tony asks Paulie how Johnny heard about Ralphie's joke about his wife, the incident which nearly led to hostilities between New Jersey and New York, but Paulie says he does not know. While Paulie was Tony's role model growing up, Tony now doubts his loyalty and usefulness. In Miami, the two men meet Beansie's Cuban contacts and agree to trade in stolen goods. Tony also arranges a bridge loan of $200,000 from Hesh to cover a string of losing sports bets.

Larry tells the FBI that the late Jackie Aprile, Sr. killed Overall. Upon receiving this news, Tony rents a sport fishing boat to celebrate with Paulie. However, Paulie is uneasy as he remembers the killing of Big Pussy on a boat. On the open sea, Tony questions Paulie again about the joke leak; Paulie again denies involvement. Tony glances at a hatchet and some fishing knives, but the tension passes. That night, Paulie has a dream in which he sees Pussy and, in a panic, asks him how he would handle his own death. Back in New Jersey, Paulie sends Tony and Carmela a $2,000 espresso machine; Tony tells her that they owe their lifestyle to people like Paulie.

In New York City, Faustino "Doc" Santoro and his bodyguard are murdered in a hit arranged by Phil, who becomes the new boss of the Lupertazzi family.

Junior is visited at his mental care center by his former soldiers Pat Blundetto and Beppy Scerbo. Junior declares that he wants an apology from Tony for being accused of shooting him. He then asks them to help him escape, but he forgets about it as soon as they leave. He returns to his old mob habits, bribing an orderly and organizing an illicit poker game for other patients. Professor Lynch, a patient Junior teases, informs on him, and the game is ended. Junior finds an admiring follower in a young patient named Carter Chong, who has been institutionalized for his anger issues.

Junior assaults Professor Lynch and is given a new regimen of sedatives. Carter devises a plan to distract the orderlies handing the pills to Junior so that he can covertly throw them away. Some of the drugs were meant to combat Junior's incontinence, and he soon humiliatingly wets himself. The orderly is fired for taking bribes, and Junior is threatened with a transfer to a less pleasant, state-run facility if he does not take his medications. He complies with the treatment, much to Carter's disillusionment. Junior tries to make up with him but calls him "Anthony." At a piano recital, Carter starts throwing paper balls at the pianist; when Junior shows disapproval, Carter becomes enraged and ferociously attacks him.

Junior is next seen with the other patients (though not Carter) receiving animal-assisted therapy in the garden. He is in a wheelchair, with one arm in a cast, seemingly sedated, apart from the others.

== Deceased ==
- Willie Overall: A bookie shot dead by Tony Soprano with a revolver on orders from "Johnny Boy" Soprano. It was Tony's first murder at the age of 22 (shown in a flashback to Labor Day, 1982) in West Orange, New Jersey.
- Faustino "Doc" Santoro: Gunned down after leaving a massage parlor in New York City by a trio of gunmen on orders from Phil Leotardo to take over his Lupertazzi crime family boss's title and as a revenge for the Gerry Torciano murder.
- Doc Santoro's bodyguard: Gunned down alongside Doc Santoro.

== Production ==
- "Remember When" was the career directorial debut of Phil Abraham, a longtime Sopranos cinematographer ever since the first season of the show. Abraham initially started only as a camera operator for the TV series.
- Lin-Manuel Miranda, writer and future star of Hamilton and In the Heights, makes a brief appearance in this episode as the bellman with whom Tony and Paulie briefly converse from the car. It was Miranda's first television acting role: he later noted the scene demonstrates his overall lack of experience, as he is visibly looking for his mark as he enters the scene. Miranda discussed his Sopranos appearance in a 2018 interview on Live with Kelly and Ryan.
- This episode marked the last appearance of actor Vincent Pastore in his role of Salvatore Bonpensiero.

== Music ==
- The song playing on the radio as Tony and Paulie travel through the Fredericksburg, Virginia area (according to the station identification for WWUZ heard in this scene) was "Rock On", by David Essex.
- The instrumental piece played in the bar during Tony and Paulie's stop in Virginia is an instrumental version of "I Just Wanna Stop" by Gino Vannelli.
- The piano piece playing in the hotel canteen, when Tony tells Paulie off, is the theme for the movie Terms of Endearment, composed by Michael Gore. The song playing as they check-in beforehand is "Touch Me in the Morning" by Diana Ross.
- The song Junior sings with the other patients is "Take Me Home, Country Roads", a song made famous in 1971 by John Denver.
- The instrumental piece played over the end credits is "Sing, Sing, Sing (With a Swing)" by the Benny Goodman Orchestra.

== Reception ==
"Remember When" had 6.85 million viewers, significantly down from the 7.66 million watching the midseason premiere "Soprano Home Movies" two weeks earlier.

Television Without Pity graded the episode with a B−, with Kim Reed calling the subplot of Junior organizing poker games in the mental institution "a parody of real mob life". Reed also praised the scene of Junior writing a letter to Vice President Dick Cheney requesting clemency. However, Reed criticized the scenes of Tony and Paulie riding the boat, considering their discussion of Big Pussy's murder as "over the top" and redundant with past episodes and the camera work to be inconsistent.

For IGN, Dan Iverson rated the episode 9.0 out of 10 points, praising the episode's theme of how different characters approach aging. Iverson concluded: "While this episode had drama to spare, it wasn't just the multi-layered conversations which got our attention, as this episode had plenty of humor as well." Los Angeles Times critic Paul Brownfield regarded the Junior subplot as the most emotional part of the episode, "a comic-tragic portrayal of a once-proud mob boss". Alan Sepinwall of The Star-Ledger called the episode "sad" and "moving" and found an unintentional coincidence between the Asian-American patient in the mental facility for anger issues and the Virginia Tech shooting that happened days before the episode's premiere but months after the episode was written.

Entertainment Weekly had a more critical review, with Lisa Schwarzbaum commenting: "This relatively ungainly episode might just as well have flashed a sign announcing that the theme of the evening was Indignities and Old Men."
