= The Fever (Bruce Springsteen song) =

1973 song performed by Bruce Springsteen

- "The Fever" 1977 bootleg single

Song by Bruce Springsteen

from the album 18 Tracks
- Released: April 13, 1999
- Recorded: May 16, 1973
- Studio: 914 Sound Studios; Blauvelt, New York
- Genre: Rock, R&B, jazz rock
- Length: 7:41
- Label: Columbia
- Songwriter(s): Bruce Springsteen
- Producer(s): Mike Appel, Bruce Springsteen, Jim Cretecos

"The Fever" (legally published as "Fever for the Girl") is a song written and recorded by Bruce Springsteen in 1973. The song would not see formal release until the 1999 compilation 18 Tracks.

== Studio recordings and live performances ==
"The Fever" was recorded in a special session at 914 Sound Studios, Blauvelt, New York on Wednesday, May 16, 1973, in just one take. The musicians were Bruce Springsteen, Danny Federici, Garry Tallent, Clarence Clemons, and Vini Lopez. No additional work for this day was notated in studio logs, nor was any during the recording sessions for Springsteen's second album The Wild, the Innocent & the E Street Shuffle, or any future recording sessions since. It was not included in any of the proposed album sequence lists or included on the album.

It is believed the earliest known live performance was during a March 1973 residency at Oliver's in Boston, MA, though rumors of 1972 performances exist. No recordings from this era exist, so this remains unconfirmed. After May 1973, there is no record of it being played for the rest of the year. It was used as a demo by manager Mike Appel's Laurel Canyon publishing arm and legally registered as "Fever for the Girl".

In early 1974, Mike Appel, without permission and contrary to the wishes of Columbia Records, sent cassette tapes of “The Fever” to several US progressive rock radio stations, including DJs like Ed Sciaky in Philadelphia, and Kid Leo in Cleveland, all extremely pro-Springsteen, and the immediately began playing it regularly. "The Fever" had no record sales, no jukebox action, but its radio airplay numbers were through the roof. It became a hit in places like Houston, Phoenix and Boston. In Philadelphia, according to a listener, “the song exploded!” WMMR put it in their regular rotation, and it led the station in phone-in requests.

However, no place was as big as Houston, Texas, thanks to several March 1974 Liberty Hall shows, and two radio broadcasts. After a successful interview by KLOL-FM's Ed Beauchamp on March 8, Springsteen was invited back the next day with the E Street Band, for a lengthy afternoon radio performance that included highlights from his first two albums, plus a rendition of "The Fever" (first time he played it in a year). That night at Liberty Hall, after a fan yelled "The Fever!", Bruce responded with, "it's a weird thing 'The Fever'… that song 'Fever' we did as a demo tape about a year ago… I promise if we'll come back, we'll work it up for you." At the late show the next day, Springsteen introduced the song by saying: "We're gonna try something now, this is something… this is a song we haven't done in about a year, but we found out that they sent a demo down here…we're gonna give it a try for you, hope we'll remember… you know but I'm gonna send this to the boys out here…uh… David Sancious later said he had been under the impression it was an old Sam Cooke classic.

== Southside Johnny and the Asbury Jukes cover ==
"The Fever"
- The Fever b-side June 1976

Song by Southside Johnny and the Asbury Jukes

from the album I Don't Want To Go Home
- A-side: "I Don't Want To Go Home"
- Released: June 7, 1976
- Recorded: January – March 1976
- Studio: Record Plant; New York City, New York
- Genre: Rock, R&B
- Length: 4:45
- Label: Epic
- Songwriter(s): Bruce Springsteen
- Producer(s): Steven Van Zandt

In late 1975, Steven Van Zandt, feeling bad about leaving his friend John Lyon alone to run the band they created, Southside Johnny and the Asbury Jukes, agreed to be their manager, get them a recording contract, and produce an album. He came through on all these commitments, even though, until January 1976, he was on tour with the E Street Band. He also asked Springsteen to help out by donating two of his compositions to the effort, “You Mean So Much To Me” and “The Fever”. Springsteen, excited by the idea, created special arrangements, including a duet for “You Mean So Much To Me” with Lyon and Ronnie Spector. The songs were played live on May 30, 1976 at the Stone Pony, Asbury Park, New Jersey, at a party thrown by Epic Records, and broadcast by ten stations in the northeast and midwest. Springsteen joined the Jukes for their final encore, "Havin' A Party". The album, I Don't Want to Go Home, was released on June 7, 1976.

== Release ==
Regardless of fan support, Springsteen did not release "The Fever" and, for over 25 years, it could only be obtained on bootleg album compilations, and one 1977 EP release on "Bruce" records. When the 64-track compilation Tracks was released in 1998, some fans were upset and disappointed when "The Promise" and "The Fever" were both nowhere to be found. A few months later, Springsteen's version was officially released on 18 Tracks. Rehearsed during soundchecks for the 1999 / 2000 reunion tour, but performed only one time on the reunion tour on September 24, 1999 in Philadelphia, PA. "Southside [Johnny and the Asbury Jukes] did a great version of it, and it’s never been one of my favorites," he said. "So I said, 'Well, I’ll put this on a B side or something.'”

In an August 19, 1978 interview on WIOQ-FM in Philadelphia with Sciaky, Springsteen would explain the song's history:

Sciaky: Wait a minute—you didn't do “Fever” for about five years.
Springsteen: It was just a surprise, you know. We'd done it two or three times and the tape had gotten out through someone's help whose name I won't mention. So we did it a few times and we had to do it here. I used to have kids run up onstage and yell in my ear, “BRUCE! ‘FEVER’!” That was always a request.
Sciaky: You used to say you didn’t like the song, and a lot of people think it’s one of your best.
Springsteen: I don’t know. It was just something that I wrote so long ago. It was just an older song and never a real favorite of mine. I liked it. I always liked it. But just for myself. I liked [Southside] Johnny’s version—I liked what he did with it a lot. But we wanted to have something extra, so we pulled it out.

Except for the 1978 Darkness Tour, and occasional duets with Southside Johnny, Springsteen did not play "The Fever" again until 1999, after the 18 Tracks release.
