= Better Days (Southside Johnny & The Asbury Jukes album) =

Studio album by Southside Johnny and the Asbury Jukes
- Released: Oct 1991
- Recorded: 1991
- Genre: Rock, R&B
- Length: 56:30
- Label: Impact
- Producer: Steven Van Zandt

Southside Johnny and the Asbury Jukes chronology
At Least We Got Shoes (1986)	Better Days (1991)	Messin' With the Blues (2000)

Better Days is an album by Southside Johnny and the Asbury Jukes, released in 1991. It yielded minor hits "It's Been a Long Time" and "I've Been Workin' Too Hard". The song "It's Been a Long Time" features shared lead vocals by Southside Johnny, Steven Van Zandt, and Bruce Springsteen and is a reflection back on their early years together in the music business. "I've Been Working Too Hard" features a duet with Jon Bon Jovi. Eight of the eleven songs were written by Van Zandt, harkening back to the Jukes' first three albums which also featured Van Zandt writing, playing guitar, and singing harmony and sometimes duet vocals. One track, "All the Way Home", was written by Bruce Springsteen who later recorded his own version of it for his 2005 solo album Devils and Dust.

== Reception ==
The Allmusic review by Kit Kiefer awarded the album 4 stars and stated, "A comeback album that by all rights shouldn't be this good, Better Days reunites Southside Johnny with his old cohorts Springsteen and Van Zandt and some special guests (Jon Bon Jovi, Flo and Eddie) for 11 bittersweet originals capped by the gorgeous soul ballad "It's Been a Long Time." ".

Professional ratings
Review scores
Source	Rating
Allmusic	4/5 stars

== Track listing ==
All tracks written by Steven Van Zandt except where noted.

1. "Coming Back" – 3:59
2. "All I Needed Was You" – 5:06
3. "It's Been a Long Time" – 5:31
4. "Soul's On Fire (Intro)" (John Lyon, Van Zandt) – 1:04
5. "Soul's On Fire" (Lyon, Van Zandt) – 6:55
6. "Better Days (Intro)" – 0:58
7. "Better Days" – 5:04
8. "I've Been Working Too Hard" – 5:06
9. "Ride The Night Away" (Steve Jordan, Van Zandt) – 5:12
10. "Right To Walk Away" (Dennis Locorriere, Lyon, Leroy Preston) – 4:45
11. "All Night Long (Intro)" (Bobby Bandiera, Lyon) – 0:19
12. "All Night Long" (Bandiera, Lyon) – 5:25
13. "All the Way Home" (Bruce Springsteen) – 3:54
14. "Shake 'Em Down" – 3:12

== Personnel ==
- Bobby Bandiera – guitar ("Ride The Night Away," "I've Been Working Too Hard," "All Night Long," "Shake 'Em Down," "The Right To Walk Away," "All The Way Home"), backing vocals ("All Night Long")
- Jon Bon Jovi – vocals (duet on "I've Been Working Too Hard"), backing vocals ("Soul's On Fire")
- Rusty Cloud – organ, hammond organ, piano
- Barry Danielian – trumpet ("All Night Long," "Ride The Night Away")
- Charley Drayton – backing vocals ("It's Been A Long Time")
- Frank Elmo – baritone saxophone ("Right To Walk Away," "Soul's On Fire," "I've Been Working Too Hard")
- Flo – backing vocals ("Ride The Night Away")
- Frenchy Gauthier – art direction
- Rick Gazda – trumpet (all songs except where noted)
- Eddie – backing vocals ("Ride The Night Away")
- Steve Jordan – backing vocals ("It's Been A Long Time")
- Richie "La Bamba" Rosenberg – trombone (all songs except where noted), additional backing vocals, horn charts
- Jeff Lancaster – design
- Dan Levine – trombone ("I've Been Working Too Hard")
- Little Steven – guitar ("Coming Back," "It's Been A Long Time," "All I Needed Was You," "Better Days," "Soul's On Fire), vocals (shared lead on "It's Been a Long Time"), backing vocals ("Coming Back," "All I Needed Was You," "Better Days," "Ride The Night Away," "Right To Walk Away," "Shake 'Em Down," "I've Been Working Too Hard"), horn arrangements, producer
- Bob Ludwig – mastering
- Jill Lyon – production coordination
- Ed Manion – baritone saxophone (all songs except where noted)
- Dave McNair – associate producer, engineer, mixing
- Benjamin Newberry – photography
- Frank Ockenfels – photography
- Mark Pender – trumpet (all songs except where noted), additional backing vocals
- Michael Scalcione – assistant engineer
- Mick Seeley – additional backing vocals
- Southside Johnny – arranger, harmonica, vocals
- Bruce Springsteen – vocals (shared lead on "It's Been a Long Time"), backing vocals ("All The Way Home"), keyboards ("All The Way Home")
- Joey Stann – tenor saxophone (all songs except where noted), additional backing vocals
- Garry Tallent – bass
- Jerry Vivino Jr. – tenor saxophone ("Right To Walk Away")
- Max Weinberg – drums
- Carol Whaley – photography
- Zoe Yanakis – maracas, photography, production coordination, tambourine
