= At Least We Got Shoes =

Studio album by Southside Johnny and the Jukes
- Released: 1986
- Recorded: 1985–1986
- Studio: House of Music, West Orange, NJ
- Genre: R&B, rock, soul
- Label: Mirage
- Producer: John Rollo, John Lyon

Southside Johnny and the Jukes chronology
In the Heat (1984)	At Least We Got Shoes (1986)	Better Days (1991)

Singles from At Least We Got Shoes
- 1. "Walk Away Renee" Released: July 1986; 2. "Tell Me (That Our Love's Still Strong)" Released: October 1986; 3. "Hard to Find" Released: 1986 (UK); 4. "You Can Count on Me" Released: 1986 (UK)

At Least We Got Shoes is an album by the American band Southside Johnny and the Jukes, released in 1986. It was the band's final album for Mirage Records. At Least We Got Shoes peaked at No. 189 on the Billboard 200. Southside Johnny and the Jukes supported the album with a North American tour.

== Production ==
The album was produced by John Rollo and John Lyon. Southside Johnny thought that he was more attentive during the production of At Least We Got Shoes, and had resolved the personal problems that were present during the making of the band's previous two albums. Bobby Bandiera replaced guitarist Billy Rush prior to the recording sessions for the album. The band, which numbered nine members for the sessions, had tested many times in a live setting all of the album's songs. "Walk Away Renée" is a cover of the Left Banke song. "I Only Want to Be with You" is a version of the song made famous by Dusty Springfield.

== Critical reception ==
Professional ratings
Review scores
Source	Rating
AllMusic	3/5 stars
MusicHound Rock: The Essential Album Guide	2.5/5 stars

The Gazette wrote that "the world's unluckiest R&B band reaches for the brass ring, but grabs it only" on the cover songs. The Kingston Whig-Standard concluded that "the band's roots have been rediscovered on this album; the zesty horns are back... The result is perhaps the best Jukes' album ever." The Houston Chronicle determined that Southside Johnny "sounds happy, rejuvenated... The upbeat horn section polishes his New Jersey rock 'n' soul, updated only slightly by keyboard programs." The San Diego Union-Tribune deemed the album "straight-ahead beer-sweat bar rock," writing that "this white T-shirt and blue jeans stuff swings like a sledgehammer." The Omaha World-Herald noted that "the horn section, which continues to be the band's driving force, seems more focused than ever."

== Track listing ==
No.	Title	Length
1.	"Hard to Find"
2.	"Tell Me (That Our Love's Still Strong)"
3.	"Walk Away Renée"
4.	"Take My Love"
5.	"You Can Count on Me"
6.	"Till The End of Night"
7.	"I Only Want to Be with You"
8.	"Lorraine"
9.	"I Can't Wait"
10.	"Under the Sun"
