= Southside Johnny and the Asbury Jukes =

American musical group

Southside Johnny & the Asbury Jukes
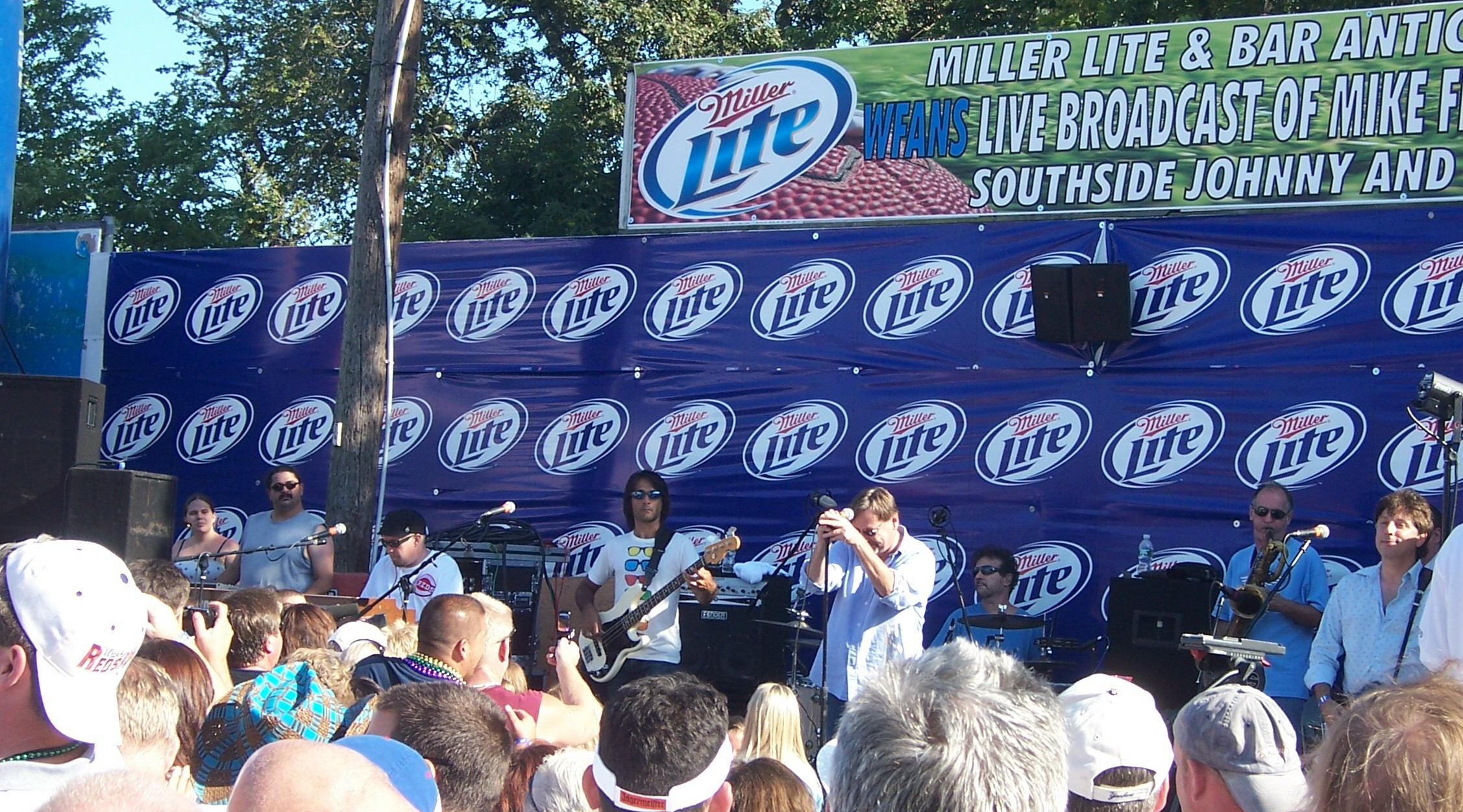
- Southside Johnny and the Asbury Jukes performing in Lake Como, New Jersey in 2008

Background information
- Also known as: Southside Johnny & the Jukes
- Origin: Asbury Park, New Jersey, U.S.
- Genres: Rock; heartland rock; Jersey Shore sound
- Years active: 1975–present
- Labels: Epic, Mercury, Mirage, Leroy
- Members: Glenn Alexander; Chris Anderson; John Conte; John Isley; Jeff Kazee; Neal Pawley; Thomas "Goose" Seguso
- Past members: Southside Johnny; Steven Van Zandt; Billy Rush; Bobby Bandiera; Joel Gramolini; Mick Seeley; Jon Bon Jovi; Ricky Byrd; Ralph Notaro; Billy Walton; Al Berger; Gene Boccia; Steve Buslowe; George L. Ruiz; Garry Tallent; David Hayes; Muddy Shews; Kenny Pentifallo; Steve Becker (deceased); Ernest Carter; Tom Major; David Beall; Joe Bellia; Louie Appel-Drums; David Longworth; Chucki Burke; Kevin Kavanaugh (deceased); Wes Nagy; Rusty Cloud; Jack Callahan; Carlo Novi; Bob Malach; Stan Harrison; Jerry Vivino; Frank Elmo; Tony Aiello; Joey Stann; Rick Gazda; Deacon Earl Gardener; Mark Pender; Tony Pallagrosi; Bob Muckin (deceased); Mike Spengler (deceased); Danny Stiles; Al Torrente; Barry Danielian; Jim Brady; Mitch guitar Kahl; Tony Perruso; Don Harris; Eddie Manion; Louie Parente; Bob Ferrel; Dan Levine; Richie "La Bamba" Rosenberg; Patti Scialfa; Soozie Kirschner; Lisa Lowell; 14 Karat Soul
- Website: www.southsidejohnny.com

Southside Johnny and the Asbury Jukes are an American musical group from the Jersey Shore formerly led by Southside Johnny. They have been recording albums since 1976 and are closely associated with Bruce Springsteen and the E Street Band. They have recorded or performed several Springsteen songs, including "The Fever" (1973) and "Fade Away" (1980). Springsteen has also performed with the band on several occasions. In 1991, Springsteen and the E Street band appeared on Southside Johnny's Better Days album.

During the band's formative years, Steven Van Zandt was the band's co-leader, guitarist, songwriter, arranger, and producer, and other members of the E Street Band, including Clarence Clemons, Max Weinberg, Garry Tallent, Ernest Carter, Patti Scialfa, and Soozie Tyrell performed, toured, or recorded with the Jukes.

The band's horn section, known as the Miami Horns, has also toured and recorded with Springsteen. More than one hundred musicians can claim to have been members of the Asbury Jukes, including Jon Bon Jovi who toured with the band as a special guest during 1990. Bon Jovi has also cited the band as an influence and Jukes' Bobby Bandiera and Jeff Kazee have also toured with Bon Jovi. Other notable band members include Mark Pender and Richie "La Bamba" Rosenberg who have played regularly with the Max Weinberg 7 on Late Night with Conan O'Brien and The Tonight Show with Conan O'Brien.

== History ==
=== 1970s ===
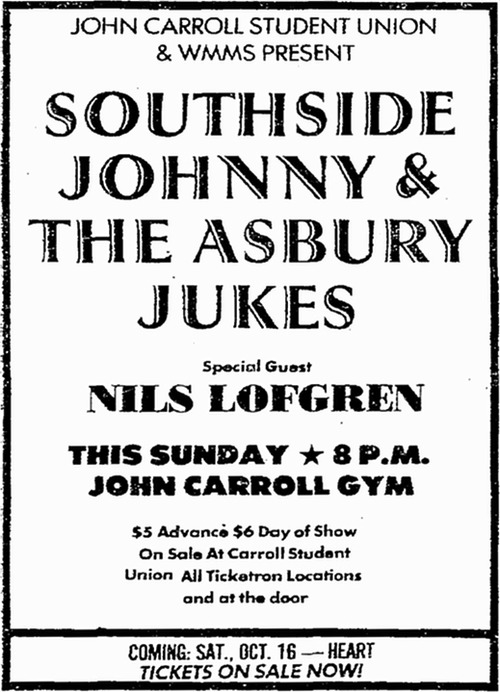
An advertisement by rock station WMMS in Cleveland, for the band's October 1976 performance with Nils Lofgren at John Carroll University in University Heights, Ohio

Southside Johnny and Steven Van Zandt, the two prime movers behind the formation of the Jukes, began playing together in various bands during the early 1970s. These bands, initially based out of The Upstage Club at 702 Cookman Avenue in Asbury Park, New Jersey, were usually short lived and often included Bruce Springsteen and various future members of The E Street Band. Funky Dusty & The Soul Broom, a short-lived 1970 band including Garry Tallent and Bobby Williams (drums), was among the first of these bands. The same quartet also acted as backing band for a local folksinger Jeannie Clark. Van Zandt was also a member of Steel Mill at the time, and Southside had just left one of his formative bands, Maelstrom. Following this, Steve Van Zandt & Friends was formed in January 1971, including Springsteen, Tallent, Williams, and Danny Federici.

By February 1971, Van Zandt and Southside, together with Tallent and David Sancious, were playing as Steve Van Zandt & The Big Bad Bobby Williams Band. In March 1971, Van Zandt and Southside also featured in a short-lived Springsteen band, The Friendly Enemies. The highlight of their brief existence was opening for The Allman Brothers. Other members of this band included Tallent, Sancious, Williams, and Vini Lopez. In April 1971, Van Zandt and Southside also began co-leading The Sundance Blues Band, a group whose line-up would also feature Springsteen, Lopez, Tallent, and Sancious. In May 1971, Springsteen also recruited all the members of The Sundance Blues Band to play in his very short-lived band, Dr. Zoom & The Sonic Boom. Among the many musicians to play with this group was Kevin Kavanaugh, a future Juke. Kavanaugh grew up in Middletown, New Jersey and was a childhood friend of Van Zandt. They had also played together in a band called The Shadows.

Beginning in July 1971, Van Zandt, Lopez, Tallent, and Sancious also began backing Springsteen as The Bruce Springsteen Band and they would eventually evolve into The E Street Band. Southside Johnny would also occasionally play with this band. 1972 would prove to be another active year for Van Zandt and Southside Johnny. As well as playing with The Sundance Blues Band, backing Springsteen, and performing as a duo, Southside Johnny & The Kid, together with Kavanaugh, they also played in bands such as Albee & The Hired Hands and the Bank Street Blues Band.

By 1974, Van Zandt was playing with Al Berger in The Dovells backing band and Southside Johnny began to play with the Blackberry Booze Band which Kenny Pentifallo had already been drumming for. It was this band that eventually evolved into the Asbury Jukes. The original BBB had been playing together since 1968 and by 1974 featured a line-up of Paul Green (harmonica, vocals), Paul Dickler (guitar), David Meyers (bass) and Kenny Pentifallo (drums).

They established themselves as the house band at The Stone Pony in Asbury Park, New Jersey. Green was the band's lead singer but he preferred to play harmonica. Southside Johnny was playing harmonica with the Bank Street Blues Band but had few opportunities to sing lead. Green and Southside Johnny effectively swapped bands and Southside Johnny soon emerged as the leader of BBB, firing Dickler and Meyers but keeping Pentifallo on the drums. He subsequently recruited Kevin Kavanaugh and Van Zandt, who in turn recruited Al Berger, and in June 1975, inspired by Little Walter & The Jukes they changed their name to the Asbury Jukes.

The original Jukes line-up was then completed with the addition of Mexican American Carlo Novi (tenor sax) and Billy Rush (guitar)

In July 1975, Steven Van Zandt joined Bruce Springsteen's E Street Band and subsequently accompanied him on the Born to Run tour. Meanwhile back in Asbury Park, the Jukes became Southside Johnny & the Asbury Jukes and continued to play as the house band at the Stone Pony. However Van Zandt maintained his association with the Jukes and produced a four-song demo at the Record Plant Studios that attracted the attention of Steve Popovich of Epic Records. This then led to Van Zandt producing their debut album, I Don't Want to Go Home, at the same studio. Van Zandt also wrote three songs for the album including "How Come You Treat Me So Bad?", which featured guest vocals from Lee Dorsey and the title track, which effectively became the band's signature tune. Other highlights on the album are two songs donated by Springsteen, "The Fever" and "You Mean So Much To Me". Clarence Clemons provided bass vocal on the former but is credited under the pseudonym Selmon T. Sachs while the latter was performed as a duet by Southside Johnny and Ronnie Spector.

During the 1970s, Van Zandt went on to produce two further albums with the Jukes. This Time It's For Real, released in 1977, saw Van Zandt write eight of the album's ten songs, including three co-written by Springsteen. It also featured guest appearances from The Drifters, The Coasters and The Five Satins. Their third album, Hearts Of Stone, released in 1978 was recorded without guest appearances and featured entirely original material. Van Zandt wrote seven of the nine songs including "Trapped Again", co-written with Southside Johnny and Springsteen. Springsteen also donated two further songs, the title track and "Talk to Me".

The band was also featured in the 1977 film Between the Lines which starred then unknown actors Jeff Goldblum, John Heard, Lindsay Crouse, Jill Eikenberry, and Stephen Collins. The band is shown performing "Sweeter Than Honey" and "Having a Party".

In 1979, Southside Johnny and the Asbury Jukes performed a homecoming concert in Asbury Park which was the subject of a documentary film directed and produced by Neal Marshad called Southside Johnny & the Asbury Jukes at the Asbury Park Convention Center. The film was first shown in January 1980 on Warner Cable's QUBE in Columbus, Ohio.

In August 1979, the band played at Knebworth Festival in England. The headline act at both their appearances at the festival, over two consecutive Saturdays on 4 and 11 August, were Led Zeppelin.

In 1979, Southside Johnny & the Asbury Jukes underwent several important changes. Their first three studio albums had only been moderate commercial successes, Lyon was injured and could not tour to support Hearts of Stone, and they were subsequently dropped by Epic Records. His commitments to Bruce Springsteen occurred as Steven Van Zandt ended his affiliation with the Jukes, leading Billy Rush to take over as the band's co-leader and principal songwriter. The next three Jukes albums were all released on Mercury Records. The Jukes was recorded at Muscle Shoals Sound Studio and produced by Barry Beckett. This was then followed by Love is a Sacrifice and a double live album Reach Up and Touch the Sky. On the live album, Stephan Galfas helped out with engineering and production and also featured a trio of backing singers, Patti Scialfa, Soozie Kirschner, and Lisa Lowell.

=== 1980s ===
In 1983, Trash It Up was released by Mirage Records and produced by Nile Rodgers while 1984's In the Heat saw Asbury dropped from the band's name. It also marked the end of Billy Rush’s association with the Jukes. After leaving the band, Rush went on produce for Taka Boom, Serge Gainsbourg, and Kacy Crowley.

In 1985, guitarist Bobby Bandiera replaced Rush. The following year, in 1986, the band released At Least We Got Shoes as Southside Johnny & the Jukes before becoming Southside Johnny & the Asbury Jukes again. In 1991 they released Better Days which yielded minor hits with "It's Been a Long Time" and "I've Been Workin' Too Hard" and included vocal contributions from Bruce Springsteen and Jon Bon Jovi. Bon Jovi even joined the band as a special guest on their 1990 tour.

The band released several more albums in the 1990s and 2000s and they changed membership several times. As of 2015 their lineup includes keyboardist Jeff Kazee and bassist John Conte.

In 1987, the band was in the film Adventures in Babysitting. They were featured in the college frat party scene singing two songs.

== 21st century ==
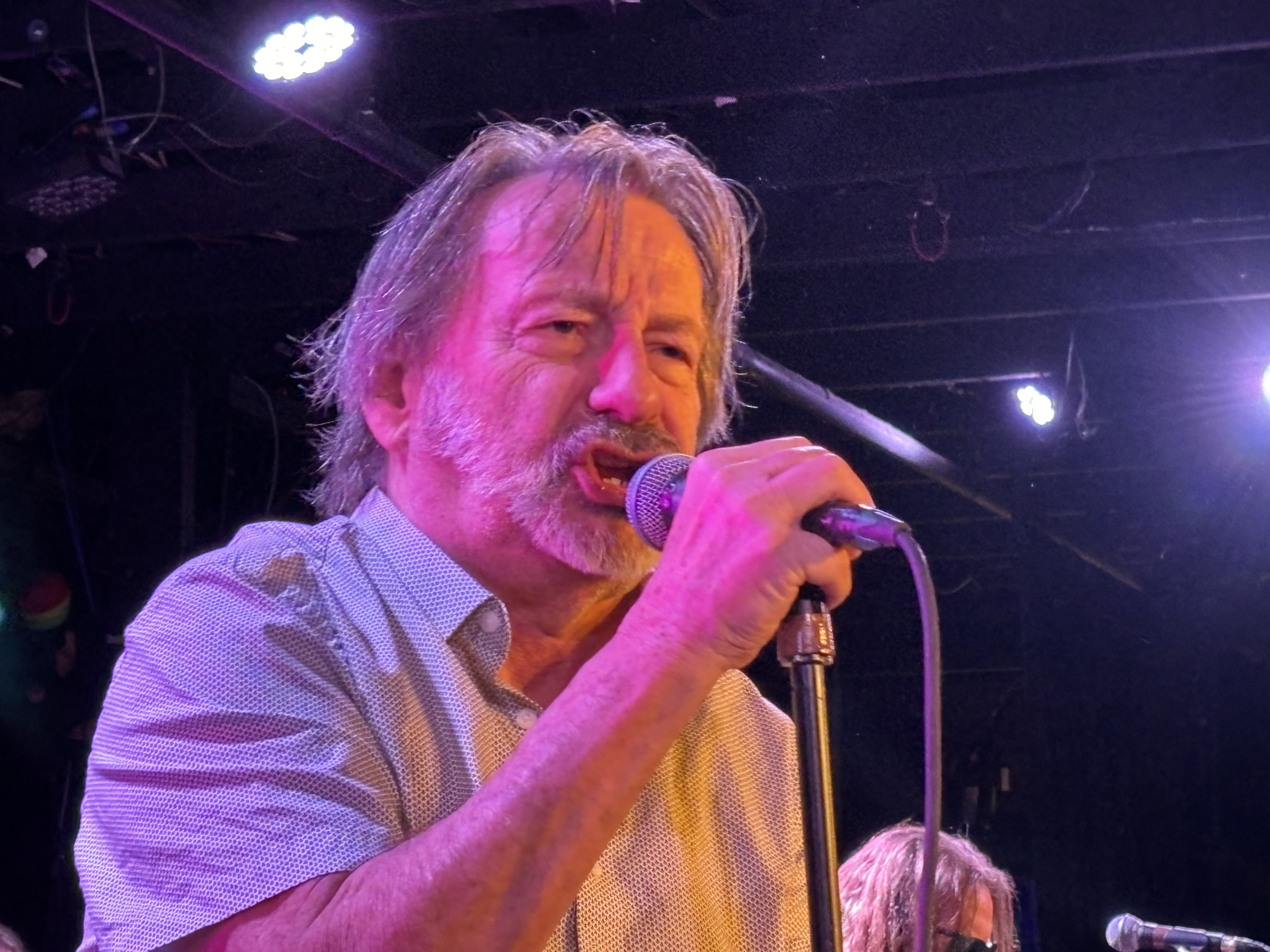
Southside Johnny performing at The Stone Pony in Asbury Park, New Jersey in the second show of a two night appearance to celebrate The Stone Pony's 50th anniversary

In 2010, the band released Pills and Ammo with songs written by Southside Johnny and Jeff Kazee. The Jukes continue to perform extensively throughout the northeast United States and annually in the UK and Europe.

In 2011, looking to expand his artistic opportunities, Southside Johnny and The Poor Fools were formed. Composed of musicians Jeff Kazee, John Conte, Tommy Brynes, and Soozie Tyrell, the ensemble plays largely an acoustic range of music from Bob Dylan, Mose Allison, Muddy Waters, NRBQ, Richard Thompson, Emmylou Harris, The Band, George Jones, and others, including some Asbury Jukes material in a stripped down format.

In February 2013, Southside Johnny and The Poor Fools released their debut studio album entitled Songs From the Barn, which was recorded in Jon Bon Jovi's converted horse barn studio in New Jersey. The album features twelve tracks, including six original songs written by John Lyon and Jeff Kazee, and includes covers the band had been playing live.

In August 2015, Southside Johnny and the Asbury Jukes released their first new album in five years, called Soultime! The album is described as a "collection of vintage-sounding contemporary soul", garnered positive reviews and the band began an extensive tour in fall 2015 in support of the album.

On February 16 and 17, 2024, Southside Johnny and the Asbury Jukes played two sold out shows at The Stone Pony to celebrate the venue's 50th anniversary. About an hour into the band's second show, Lyon told the crowd he wasn't feeling well but would try to go on. He then stumbled backwards, knocked over the mic stand and sat briefly on a bench on stage before being taken away for medical attention. The show continued with Kazee and Bandiera handling much of the vocals. It was later reported that Lyon suffered from dehydration.

On December 20, 2024, Southside Johnny announced his retirement from touring for health reasons. The announcement on the band's website reads: "After a hugely successful 50-year run with his band Southside Johnny and the Asbury Jukes, touring non-stop throughout the U.S and overseas, 'Southside Johnny' Lyon has made the decision to retire from touring in order to manage ongoing health issues."

== Members ==
Current

- Southside Johnny – lead vocals, harmonica (1975–present)
- Glenn Alexander – guitars, vocals (2010–present)
- Chris Anderson – trumpet, flugelhorn (1997–present)
- John Conte – bass (2008–present)
- John Isley – saxophone
- Jeff Kazee – piano, Hammond organ
- Neal Pawley – trombone
- Thomas "Goose" Seguso – drums (2010–present)

Former

- Steven Van Zandt – lead and rhythm guitar (1975–1980)
- Billy Rush – lead and rhythm guitar (1975–1986)
- Bobby Bandiera – vocals, lead and rhythm guitar (1986–2010)
- Joel Gramolini – guitar
- Mick Seeley – guitar, keyboards
- Jon Bon Jovi – guitar (1990)
- Ricky Byrd – guitar
- Jack Callahan – guitar
- Ralph Notaro – guitar
- Billy Walton – guitar
- Al Berger – bass, guitar (1975-???)
- Gene Boccia – bass
- Steve Buslowe – bass
- George L. Ruiz – bass
- Garry Tallent – bass
- David Hayes – bass
- Muddy Shews – bass
- Kelly Tyrrel – bass
- Kenny Pentifallo – Drums/Bass Vocals (1974–1978)
- Max Weinberg - drums ("Hearts of Stone")
- Steve Becker – drums (*7 November 1952; † 1 June 2014)
- Ernest Carter – drums
- Tom Major – drums
- David Beal – drums
- Joe Bellia – drums
- David Longworth – drums
- Chucki Burke – drums
- Kevin Kavanaugh – keyboards (*27 November 1951; † 4 June 2011)
- Wes Nagy – keyboards
- Rusty Cloud – keyboards
- Carlo Novi – tenor saxophone (1975-???)
- Bob Kalach – tenor saxophone
- Stan Harrison – tenor saxophone
- Jerry Vivino – tenor saxophone
- Frank Elmo – tenor saxophone
- Tony Aiello – tenor saxophone
- Joey Stann – tenor saxophone
- Rick Gazda – trumpet
- Deacon Earl Gardener – trumpet
- Mark Pender – trumpet
- Tony Pallagrosi – trumpet
- Bob Muckin – trumpet
- Mike Spengler – trumpet
- Danny Stiles – trumpet
- Al Torrente – trumpet
- Barry Danielian – trumpet
- Jim Brady – trumpet
- Tony Perruso – trumpet
- Don Harris – trumpet
- Eddie Manion – baritone saxophone
- Louie Parente – trombone
- Bob Ferrell – trombone
- Amedeo "Beef" Ciminnisi-trombone
- Dan Levine – trombone
- Richie "La Bamba" Rosenberg – trombone
- Patti Scialfa – backing vocals
- Soozie Kirschner – backing vocals
- Lisa Lowell – backing vocals
- 14 Karat Soul – backing vocals

== Discography ==
=== Studio albums ===
- Southside Johnny & The Asbury Jukes
  - I Don't Want to Go Home (1976)
  - This Time It's for Real (1977)
  - Hearts of Stone (1978)
  - The Jukes (1979)
  - Love Is a Sacrifice (1980)
  - Better Days (1991)
  - Messin' With the Blues (2000)
  - Going To Jukesville (2002)
  - Into the Harbour (2005)
  - Pills and Ammo (2010)
  - Soultime! (2015)
- Southside Johnny & The Jukes
  - Trash It Up (1983)
  - In the Heat (1984)
  - At Least We Got Shoes (1986)
- Southside Johnny
  - Slow Dance (1988)
  - Detour Ahead: The Music of Billie Holliday (2017)
- Southside Johnny with La Bamba's Big Band
  - Grapefruit Moon: The Songs of Tom Waits (2008)
- Southside Johnny and The Poor Fools
  - Songs From the Barn (2013)

=== Live recordings ===
- Southside Johnny & The Asbury Jukes
  - Live at the Bottom Line (1976)
  - Live: Reach Up and Touch the Sky (1981)
  - Live at the Paradise Theater (2000)
  - From Southside to Tyneside (2008)
  - 1978: Live in Boston (2008)
  - Hearts of Stone LIVE (2009)
  - Men Without Women LIVE (2012)
  - Live Bottom Line NYC 77 (2015)
  - Live From E Street (EP) (2017)
  - Asbury Park to Paris: Non-Stop (2017)
- Southside Johnny
  - Spittin' Fire (1997)
- Southside Johnny & Little Steven
  - Unplugged Live 1993
  - Unplugged vol. 2
  - Talk To Me Radio Broadcast - 1991

=== Compilations ===
- Southside Johnny and the Asbury Jukes
  - Havin' a Party With Southside Johnny (1979)
  - The Best of Southside Johnny & The Asbury Jukes (1992)
  - All I Want Is Everything – The Best of 1979 – 1991 (1993)
  - Ruff Stuff (EP) (1995)
  - Rockin’ With the Jukes (1998)
  - Restless Heart (1998)
  - More Ruff Stuff (EP) (2000)
  - Superhits (2001)
  - Found In a Closet (EP) (2003)
  - Missing Pieces (2004)
  - Collections (2006)
  - Jukebox (2007)
  - Fever! The Anthology 1976–1991 (2008)
  - Ruff Stuff 3 (EP) (2008)
  - Acoustic Ammo (EP) (2011)
  - Playlist: The Very Best of Southside Johnny & The Asbury Jukes ('76-'80) (2013)
  - The Fever: The Remastered Epic Recordings (2017)

=== Singles and remixes ===
- Southside Johnny & The Asbury Jukes
  - I'm So Anxious - (1979) Billboard Hot 100 #71
- Southside Johnny & The Jukes
  - Trash It Up - Divers Version Mix (1983)
  - Get Your Body On The Job - Version Short & Long Version (1983)
  - New Romeo - Dub Version (1984)
  - Love Is The Drug - Long Version (1984)
  - Captured - Long Version & Mix Version (1984)
  - Walk Away Renee - (1986) Billboard Hot 100 #98

Only available in Vinyl 45 Tour and 33 Tour
