= Bobby Bandiera =

American guitarist, singer, and songwriter

Robert Bandiera
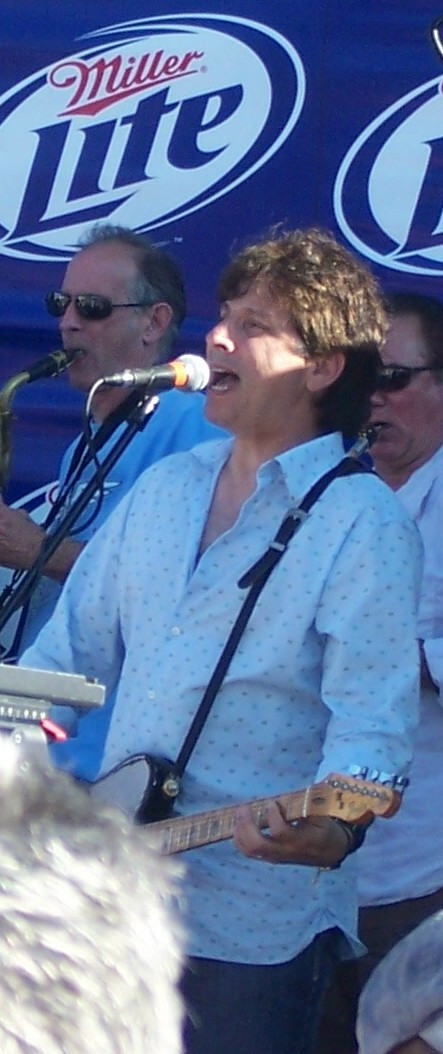
- Bandiera performing with Southside Johnny and The Asbury Jukes, Lake Como, New Jersey, 2008

Background information
- Also known as: Bobby
- Born: Robert Bandiera; October 19, 1953 (age 72)
- Genres: Rock, blues
- Occupation: Musician
- Instruments: Vocals, guitar, mandolin, bass guitar, banjo
- Years active: 1969–present
- Formerly of: Southside Johnny & The Asbury Jukes
- Website: bobbandiera.com

Robert Bandiera (born October 19, 1953) is an American rock guitarist, singer, and songwriter from New Jersey. Bandiera played rhythm guitar for Bon Jovi in live performances from 2005 until 2015 and for over two decades was lead guitarist for Southside Johnny and the Asbury Jukes. Bandiera and his band (The Bobby Bandiera Band) have backed Bruce Springsteen at benefit concerts.

== Biography ==
Bandiera began playing in clubs over 55 years ago at the age of 16. Originally, he was in a band called Holme from Orange, New Jersey. They debuted in 1970 and were the house band for years at Dodd's in Orange, New Jersey, as well as D'Jais in Belmar, New Jersey, where Bandiera still makes occasional appearances.

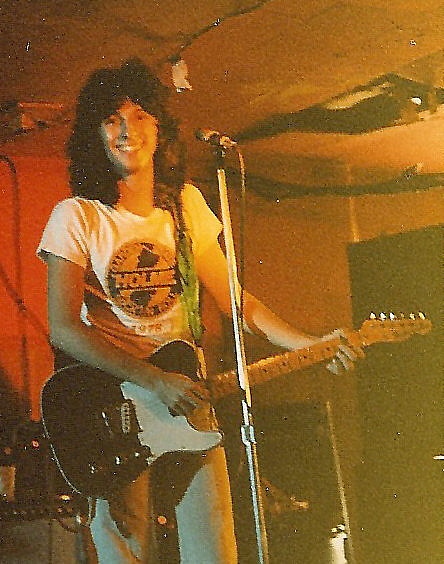
Bobby Bandiera playing with Holme at Art Stock's Royal Manor South in Wall, NJ, in 1978

A longtime presence on the Jersey Shore, Bandiera was associated with major acts. He was considered for the guitarist position in the E Street Band for the Born in the U.S.A. Tour in 1984, when Steven Van Zandt left the band, but this position went to Nils Lofgren. In 1985, Bandiera replaced Billy Rush as guitarist for Southside Johnny and the Asbury Jukes but in 2010 left the band.

In the mid-1990s, Bandiera and Southside Johnny made a number of shows as a duo. Bandiera has also played with Dave Edmunds and has his own band, The Bobby Bandiera Band, which performs regularly around the New Jersey shore area when Bandiera is not on tour. Bandiera has had an active solo career, releasing three albums and often playing during Springsteen's Asbury Park holiday shows of the early 2000s. His most famous song is "C'mon Caroline," which he co-wrote with Bob Burger, another talented Jersey shore musician. He also does studio musician work, and has appeared on albums by Cyndi Lauper, Patti Scialfa, and others.

In 2003, Bandiera toured with Bon Jovi during This Left Feels Right Live session. From 2005 until 2015, he played rhythm guitar in Bon Jovi's live performances. According to Jon Bon Jovi, he is on "permanent loan" to the band from Southside Johnny (having not played with the Jukes since 2010).

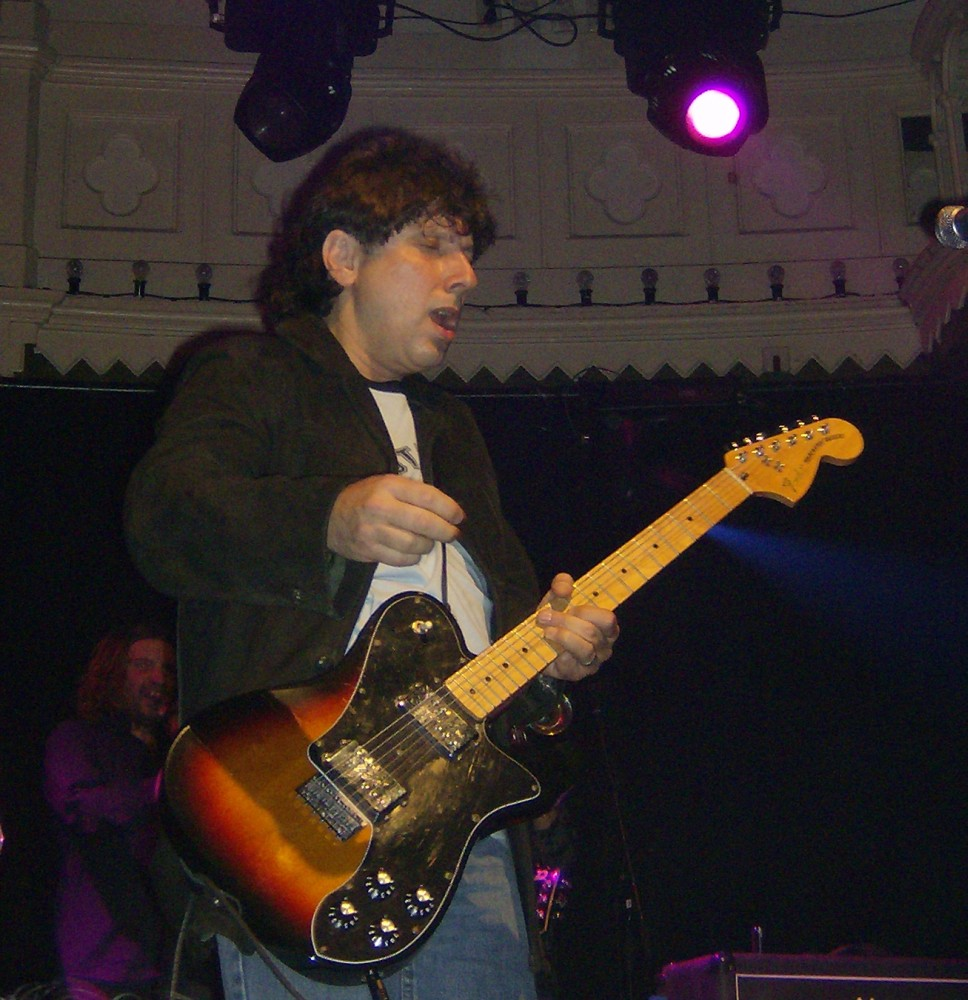
Bandiera performing in Amsterdam in 2006

== Discography ==
=== Albums ===
- Bandiera · (Released 1991)
- Dog Loves You · (Released 1995)
- Is My Father There · (Released 2005)
