= Southside Johnny =

American musician (born 1948)

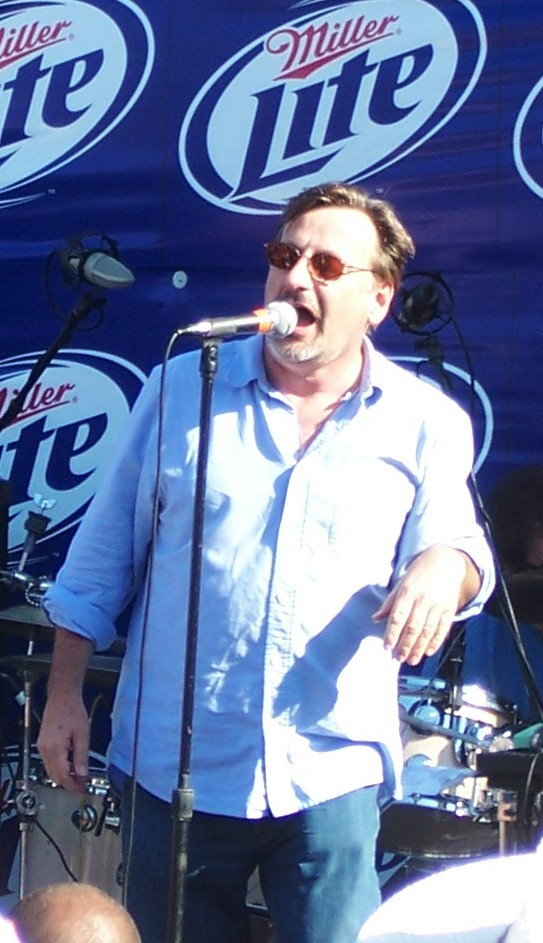
- Southside Johnny performing in 2008

Background information
- Born: John Lyon; December 4, 1948 (age 77); Neptune Township, New Jersey, U.S.
- Genres: Rock, blues, blue-eyed soul
- Occupations: Singer-songwriter, musician
- Instruments: Vocals, guitar, harmonica
- Years active: 1970–2024
- Labels: Epic Records, Mercury Records, Leroy Records, Mirage Records
- Website: SouthsideJohnny.com

John Lyon (born December 4, 1948), known professionally as Southside Johnny, is a retired American singer-songwriter who fronted the band Southside Johnny and the Asbury Jukes.

Southside Johnny has long been considered the Grandfather of "the New Jersey Sound." Jon Bon Jovi has acknowledged Southside Johnny as his "reason for singing." He is a member of the New Jersey Hall of Fame, Class of 2018.

== Biography ==
=== Early days ===
John Lyon was born in Neptune, New Jersey, and grew up in Ocean Grove, New Jersey. He grew up in a home full of music and with his parents' big record collection of blues and jazz; his father played bass in bands. "I grew up on music. We listened to Billie Holiday, T-Bone Walker, Muddy Waters and Big Joe Turner. My parents loved music, the louder the better. My father played in bands for years, and my mother went into labor with me at some seedy New Jersey club. I guess some things were just meant to be."

In 1967, Lyon graduated from Neptune High School with Garry Tallent and Vini Lopez who would both go on to play with him in the future.

=== 1975–1980 ===
Southside Johnny first achieved prominence in the mid-1970s as the second act to emerge from the Jersey Shore music scene and is considered part of the Jersey Shore sound, following Bruce Springsteen. Southside Johnny's first three albums, I Don't Want to Go Home (1976), This Time It's for Real (1977), and Hearts of Stone (1978), were Stax-influenced R&B, arranged and produced by the co-founder of the band and Springsteen confederate Steven Van Zandt, and largely featured songs written by Van Zandt and/or Springsteen. The Van Zandt-written "I Don't Want To Go Home" became Southside Johnny's signature song, an evocative mixture of horn-based melodic riffs and sentimental lyrics. Other notable songs included "The Fever", "Talk to Me", "This Time It's For Real", "Love on the Wrong Side of Town", and a cover of Springsteen's "Hearts of Stone".

In 1977, Southside Johnny and the Asbury Jukes were featured as a bar band in the movie Between the Lines.

On August 8, 1979, days after going down in a storm at the Knebworth Festival (on the same bill as Led Zeppelin’s homecoming first UK gig in four years), Southside Johnny and the Asbury Jukes performed a homecoming concert in Asbury Park that was the subject of a documentary film directed and produced by Neal Marshad called Southside Johnny & The Asbury Jukes at the Asbury Park Convention Center. The film was first shown in January 1980 on Warner Cable's QUBE in Columbus, Ohio.

=== 1980–1990 ===
In 1979, the band was dropped by its record company. Now working without Van Zandt, it released The Jukes in 1979 and Love is a Sacrifice in 1980. Neither of these achieved much success. The band's first official live release also came out in 1980, the double live album Reach Up and Touch the Sky.

In 1981, Southside Johnny and the Asbury Jukes appeared on the Canadian sketch comedy television show SCTV, featured as a wedding band. Johnny and the band played three full songs, including "The Fever", and performed many truncated versions of their other tunes. Johnny acted in one sketch, and the entire band was featured as a plot point in another.

In 1982 Rolling Stone voted the album Hearts of Stone among the top 100 albums of the 1970s and 1980s.

In 1983, Southside Johnny served as a technical advisor on the film Eddie and the Cruisers.

During the 1980s Southside Johnny's recording contracts continued to change almost by album, but he continued to release records: Trash It Up (1983), a Latin freestyle-influenced album written by Billy Rush and produced by Nile Rodgers; In the Heat (1984) an album trying to reach out to "Adult Contemporary" radio; and At Least We Got Shoes (1986), where guitarist and Jersey shore fixture Bobby Bandiera took over songwriting and guitar work from Billy Rush and led the Asbury Jukes back to its original sound. Songwriting credits on At Least We Got Shoes also contain a song co-written by Bandiera and singer Patti Scialfa, who was known as a Jukes collaborator since the 1980 album Love is a Sacrifice and who became a member of Bruce Springsteen's E Street Band in 1984.

In 1985, Southside Johnny contributed the title track of the film Tuff Turf.

In 1986, Southside contributed the track "Let Me at 'Em" to the soundtrack of the film Karate Kid II.

In 1987, Southside Johnny and the Jukes were featured in the film Adventures in Babysitting, performing at a college fraternity party. They performed the songs "Future in Your Eyes" and "Expressway to Your Heart".

In 1988, Southside Johnny released his first solo record Slow Dance containing ballads and love songs like "On the Air", but also "Little Calcutta", a rare political song, describing the life of the homeless in New York City.

=== 1990s ===
In the early 1990s, Johnny lived in Southern California in the beachside city of San Clemente.

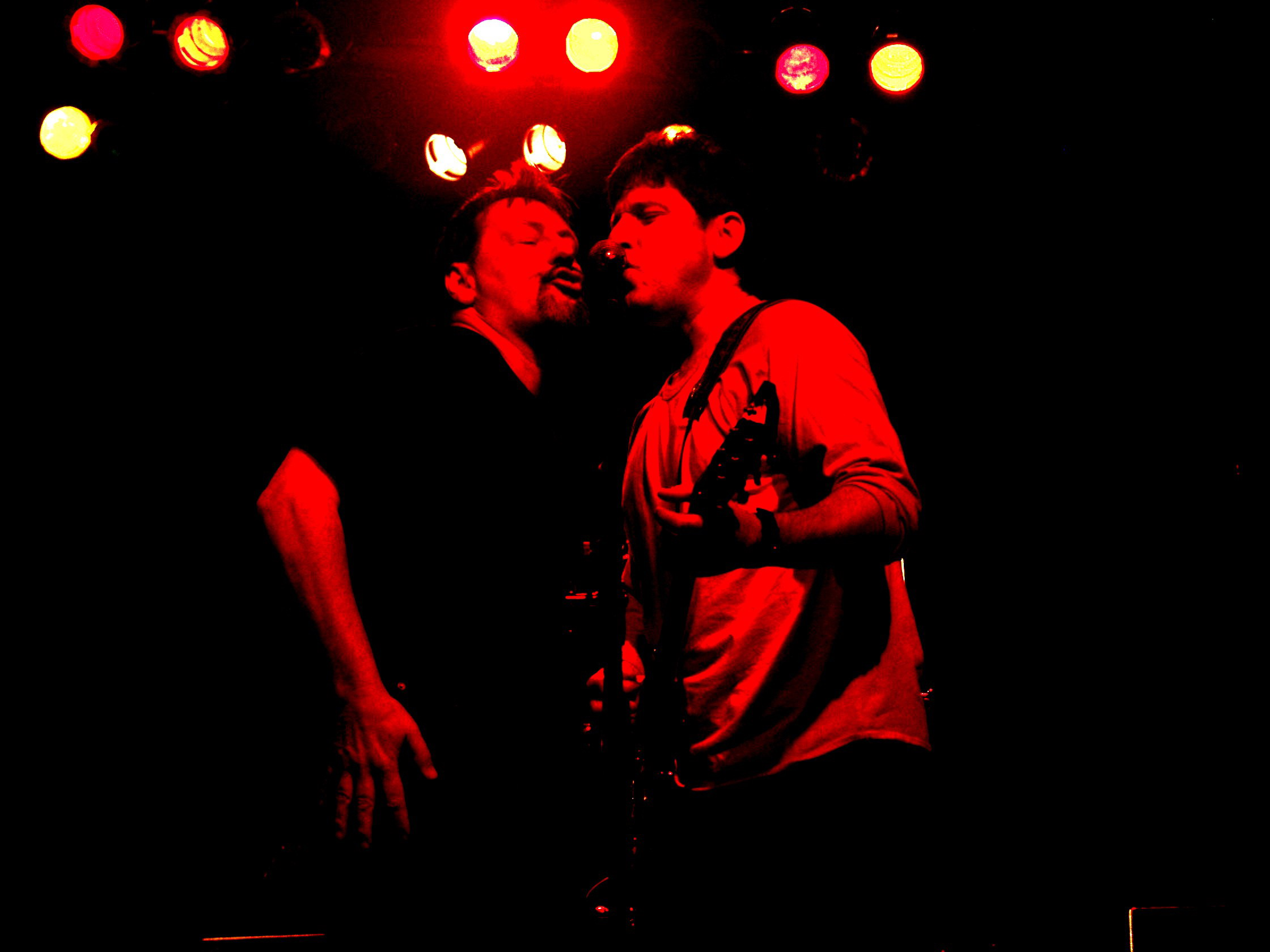
Southside Johnny & Bobby Bandiera in 2005

In 1990, Southside Johnny contributed the songs "Memories of You" and "Written in the Wind" to the film Captain America. Additionally, he performed the song "Please Come Home for Christmas" for the 1990 film Home Alone.

His recording career was re-launched with the album Better Days (1991), which featured production by Van Zandt, songs by Springsteen, and vocal performances from Van Zandt, Springsteen and Jon Bon Jovi. With Bobby Bandiera driving the band, the Jukes were gaining new energy for a worldwide tour supporting the album. But once again, Southside Johnny's bad luck with the industry was shown when the record label went bankrupt while the tour was still rolling.

Southside Johnny performed the theme song for the 1990s television sitcom Dave's World, a cover of Billy Joel's "You May Be Right."

In 1992, Johnny contributed the song "Shake 'Em Down" to the film The Mighty Ducks.

Southside Johnny eventually relocated to Nashville, Tennessee, taking a break from the music business. A few members of the Asbury Jukes would end up being part of The Max Weinberg 7 on the Late Night with Conan O'Brien television show, while some others went on tour and into the recording studio with artists such as Jon Bon Jovi, Mink DeVille, Graham Parker, and Robert Cray.

In 1998, Johnny came back into the spotlight with an independent release titled Spittin' Fire, a live record with a semi-acoustic Jukes lineup released in France containing a 20-song set recorded during a series of 10 shows at the Chesterfield Café in Paris, France.

=== 2000s ===
Since 2001 Southside Johnny and the Jukes have toured the UK and Europe as an annual event, their first since the 1992 Better Days tour, although Southside and Bobby Bandiera did some acoustic shows in 1995.

After a decade without a record contract Johnny finally founded his own record label in 2001 under the name of Leroy Records, and started releasing and distributing his new records fully under his own control: Messin' with the Blues (2000), Going to Jukesville (2002), Missing Pieces (2004), Into the Harbour (2005). Southside Johnny continued to perform, and maintained substantial audience followings as 2002's Live At The Opera House DVD, filmed at a sold-out performance in Newcastle upon Tyne, demonstrated.

In 2007, Southside Johnny appeared in an episode of The Sopranos TV show entitled "Chasing It", where he performed the song "Bossman" with Nancy Sinatra.

In 2008, Southside Johnny collaborated with long-time Asbury Jukes trombone player Richie "La Bamba" Rosenberg, for a break from the classic Asbury Jukes sound to classic Big-Band Jazz. Together with a 20-piece big band they recorded a cover album of songs written by Tom Waits, arranged and conducted by Rosenberg.

As of 2009, Southside Johnny lives again in his original hometown Ocean Grove.

In June 2010 The Jukes' album Pills and Ammo was released and received the most critical acclaim since Better Days. The songs were primarily written by Southside Johnny and Jukes keyboard player Jeff Kazee.

On September 24, 2010, Southside Johnny and the Jukes kicked off an international tour with a free performance at Overpeck Park in Ridgefield Park, New Jersey. Southside Johnny and the Asbury Jukes continued to be a fixture on the U.S. Northeast music scene including New York, New Jersey, Pennsylvania, Massachusetts and Maryland, as well as throughout the UK and Europe, until his retirement in 2024.

On July 2, 2011, Southside Johnny and the Jukes recorded a live performance of Stevie Van Zandt's Men Without Women album at the Stone Pony in New Jersey for release on CD. The material on Men Without Women was composed almost entirely of unused material originally recorded by Southside Johnny during the Hearts of Stone sessions, later re-recorded by Van Zandt as his first solo album.

In October 2011, with his band The Poor Fools, he recorded a version of "I'm Down" for The Beatles Complete on Ukulele.

In January 2013, he released a CD called Songs from the Barn with his side project, The Poor Fools. On May 4, 2014, Southside Johnny headlined at the Hoboken Arts and Music Festival with 300 artists and 30 musicians in Hoboken, New Jersey. Southside Johnny and the Jukes most recent album, called Soultime!, was released in September 2015.

In 2017, Southside Johnny and the Asbury Jukes appeared as themselves in the "Sic Transit Imperium" episode of the Showtime TV series Billions, performing "I Don't Want to Go Home" and "Looking for a Good Time."

On October 27, 2019, Southside Johnny was inducted into the New Jersey Hall of Fame at the Paramount Theatre in Asbury Park.

On July 11, 2020, Southside Johnny and the Asbury Jukes played the first major concert in New Jersey during the pandemic, playing a Drive-In Concert at Monmouth Racetrack in Oceanport, New Jersey. More than 1,000 vehicles attended, with patrons staying in their cars for the performance. In lieu of clapping, horns were honked in a show of appreciation of the music.

On December 20, 2024, Southside Johnny announced his retirement from touring for health reasons. The announcement on the band's website reads: "After a hugely successful 50-year run with his band Southside Johnny and the Asbury Jukes, touring non-stop throughout the U.S and overseas, 'Southside Johnny' Lyon has made the decision to retire from touring in order to manage ongoing health issues."

== Discography ==
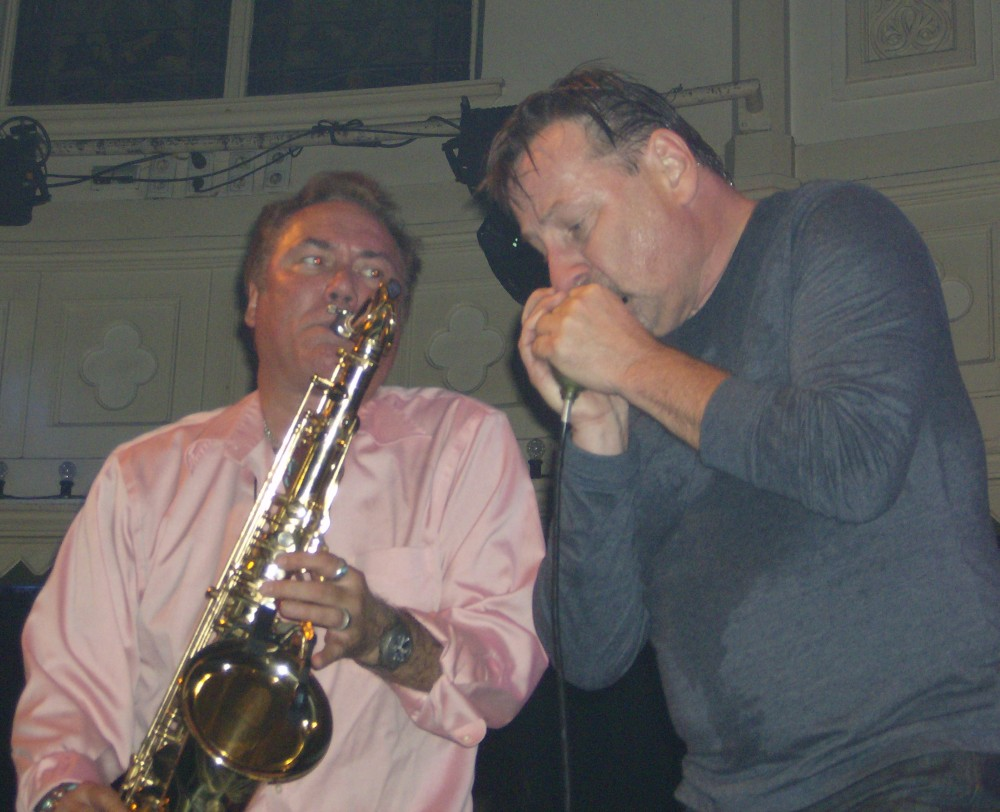
Southside Johnny and saxophonist Joey Stann in 2007

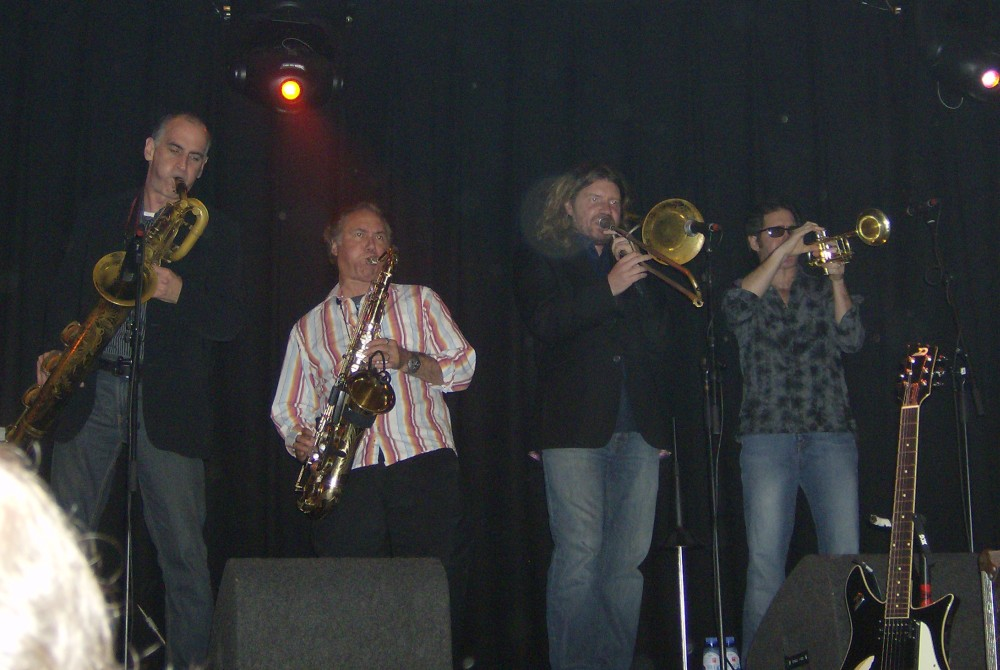
The horn section of the Asbury Jukes in 2006

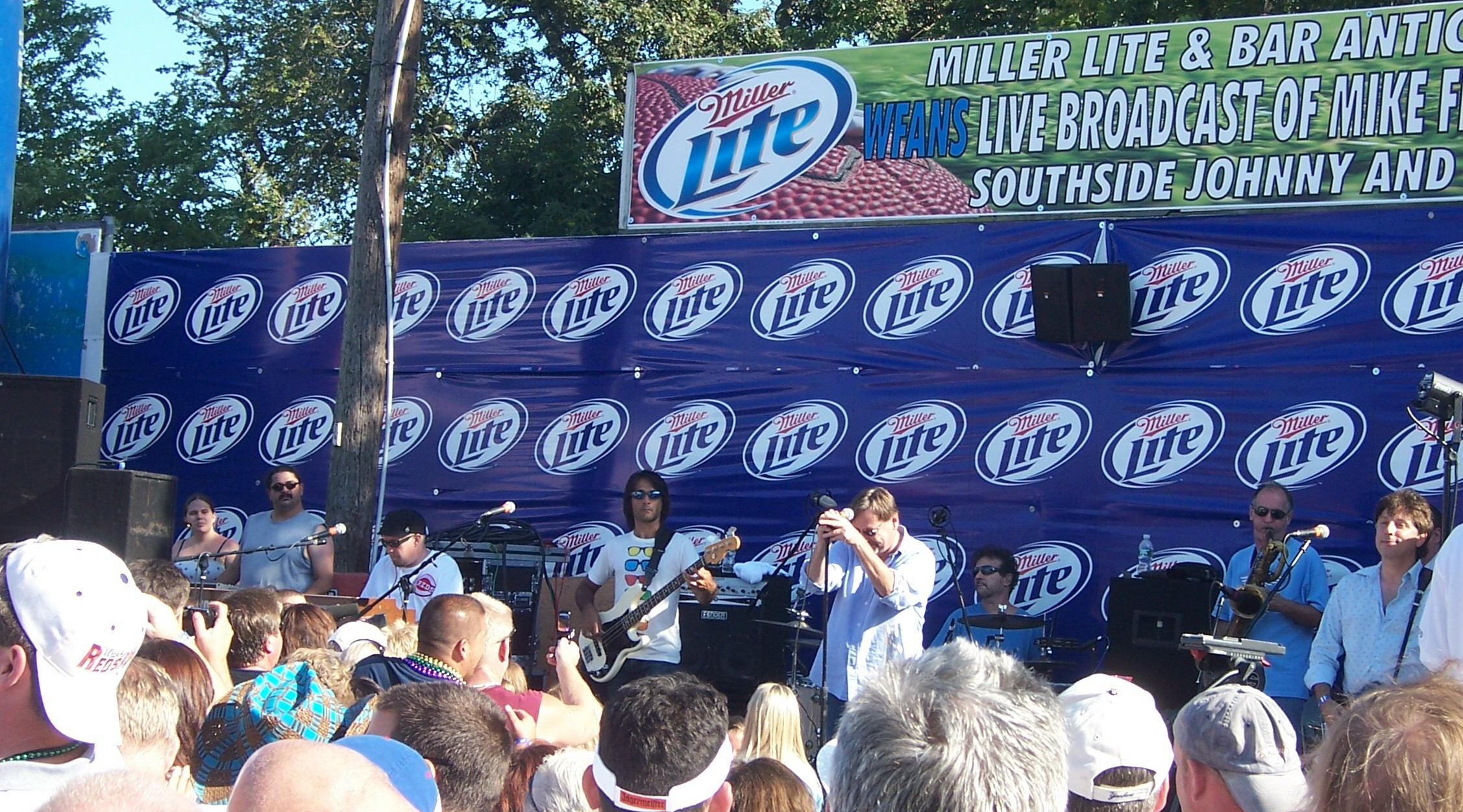
Southside Johnny and some more of the Asbury Jukes at their annual end-of-summer Bar A show, Lake Como, New Jersey, 2008

- Southside Johnny & the Asbury Jukes
  - I Don't Want to Go Home (1976)
  - Live at the Bottom Line (1976)
  - This Time It's for Real (1977)
  - Hearts of Stone (1978)
  - The Jukes (1979)
  - Havin’ a Party With Southside Johnny (1979)
  - Love Is a Sacrifice (May 26,1980)
  - Live: Reach Up and Touch the Sky (1981)
  - Trash It Up (1983)
  - In the Heat (1984)
  - At Least We Got Shoes (1986)
  - Better Days (1991)
  - Ruff Stuff (EP) (1995)
  - Live at the Paradise Theater (2000)
  - Messin' With the Blues (2000)
  - More Ruff Stuff (EP) (2000)
  - Going to Jukesville (2002)
  - Found in a Closet (EP) (2003)
  - Missing Pieces (2004)
  - Into the Harbour (2005)
  - Jukebox (2007)
  - Ruff Stuff 3 (EP) (2008)
  - From Southside to Tyneside (2008)
  - 1978: Live in Boston (2008)
  - Hearts of Stone LIVE (2009)
  - Pills and Ammo (2010)
  - Acoustic Ammo (EP) (2011)
  - Men Without Women LIVE (2012)
  - Soultime! (2015)
- Southside Johnny
  - Slow Dance (1988)
  - Spittin' Fire (1997) (live)
- Southside Johnny with La Bamba's Big Band
  - Grapefruit Moon: The Songs of Tom Waits (2008)
- Southside Johnny & the Poor Fools
  - Songs from the Barn (2013)
- Selected others
  - Jersey Artists for Mankind: "We Got the Love" / "Save Love, Save Life" (1986)
  - Soundtrack: Home Alone (1990)
  - Killer Joe: Scene of the Crime (1991)
  - Rusty Cloud: Walkin' the Night (1994)
  - Rattlesnake Guitar, The Music of Peter Green: Baby When the Sun Goes Down (1997)
  - Gary U.S. Bonds: Back in 20 (2004)
  - Southside Johnny & The Asbury Jukes - Live In England
