= Renegade Nation =

Music and entertainment company

- Industry: Music & entertainment
- Founded: 1999; 27 years ago
- Founder: Steven Van Zandt
- Headquarters: New York City, New York, United States
- Key people: Steven Van Zandt, (Chairman and CEO); Jean Beauvoir, (former CEO); Marc Brickman, (Artist Management)
- Parent: Renegade Nation
- Divisions: Wicked Cool Records; Renegade Radio; Renegade Circus; Renegade TV; Renegade Books; Renegade Management
- Website: undergroundgarage.com

Renegade Nation is a music and entertainment company founded by Steven Van Zandt in 1999. The company focuses on artist management, production, live events, and distribution. It is also the parent company of Van Zandt's independent record label, Wicked Cool Records, and distributes Little Steven's Underground Garage.

== History ==
After Van Zandt's 1989 album Revolution lacked attention, his then label, RCA, turned down the demos for his next album, Born Again Savage, stating that "rock music was over." By 1994, due to the shift in popularity from rock to pop music, and his lack of a recording contract, he started to record Born Again Savage with U2 bassist Adam Clayton, eventually resulting in the creation of his own record label.

After the success of the Underground Garage radio show, which first premiered on April 6, 2002, Van Zandt expanded the company to include radio, live events, TV, artist management, and a subsidiary record label, Wicked Cool Records.

Musician and longtime friend of Van Zandt, Jean Beauvoir, took a break to serve as CEO and Managing Director of the company for six and a half years, from 2004 to 2011, before returning to performing.

In July 2013, it was announced that Marc Brickman would become the head of Renegade Management. Van Zandt made the decision after hiring him to put together the lighting for The Rascals' Once Upon a Dream tour.

== Imprints ==
=== Wicked Cool Records ===
Van Zandt's record label, Wicked Cool Records, was created in 2004 with the purpose of supporting new rock bands, inspired by the Underground Garage radio show. The majority of the bands signed to the label have experience with smaller, independent labels, with rare exceptions. The label also reissues some albums that have not been previously commercially successful. In 2007, Wicked Cool had a partnership with retailer Best Buy so that albums heard on Underground Garage could be easily found in stores. The first album to be released by Wicked Cool Records was Davie Allan and the Arrows' Fuzz for the Holidays, released on December 14, 2004. Other early releases include Strange Magic by The Charms, The Mindbending Sounds of...The Chesterfield Kings, Mastermind by the Cocktail Slippers, and the tribute album CBGB Forever. The label is also known for its compilation albums Little Steven's Underground Garage presents The Coolest Songs in the World. Halloween and Christmas-themed compilations were also released beginning in 2008. In 2017, Van Zandt's album, Soulfire, was released, marking his first new solo album since 1999. Currently, the label has 29 artists signed to it, the newest of which is The Dollyrots, which signed with the label in 2018.

=== Renegade Radio ===
Renegade Radio focuses on publishing Underground Garage and SiriusXM's Outlaw Country.

=== Renegade Circus ===
Renegade Circus focuses on putting on live shows, including The Rascals' Once Upon a Dream, "Underground Garage A Go-Go," "Outlaw Country Cruise," and other various live shows related to Underground Garage.

=== Renegade TV ===
Renegade TV does television and streaming production services. They produced Van Zandt's original Netflix series, Lilyhammer, from 2012–2014, the MTV Underground Garage National Battle of the Bands, the VH1 special Cheap Trick or Treat Halloween Ball, and the first ESPN New Year's Eve Concert special.

=== Renegade Books ===
Renegade Books focuses on printing books for certain occasions, including a Soulfire songbook.

=== Renegade Management ===
This subsidiary focuses on artist management.

=== Renegade Theatre ===
Created in 2006, Renegade Theatre focuses on producing Broadway shows, including Eddie Brigati: After the Rascals, Vincent Pastore's play Crazy Horse, and This One's for Jack, a tribute to Renegade Theatre member Jack Ferry, who died at age 42. Van Zandt's wife, Maureen Van Zandt, is co-artistic director of Renegade Theatre.

=== Fuzztopia ===
Van Zandt also created a music website entitled Fuzztopia to let musicians help each other and dubbed it "the first international music website." Although the website no longer exists, its YouTube channel is still available.

== Wicked Cool Records roster ==
=== Current artists ===
- The Breakers
- Bobby Mahoney
- Brian Ray
- The Chesterfield Kings
- The Chevelles
- Cocktail Slippers
- The Contrast
- The Coolies
- Demolition 23
- The Dollyrots
- The Empty Hearts
- Ginger Wildheart
- The Jellybricks
- Jesse Malin
- Joy Buzzer
- Ko and the Knockouts
- Kris Rodgers and the Dirty Gems
- Kurt Baker
- The Launderettes
- The Len Price 3
- Little Steven and the Disciples of Soul
- The Maggots
- Marc Ribler
- Marc Valentine
- Michael Des Barres
- Mickey Leigh's Mutated Music
- Palmyra Delran
- Prima Donna
- Richard and the Young Lions
- Ryan Hamilton and the Harlequin Ghosts
- Soraia
- Spanking Charlene
- The Shadows of Knight
- Slim Jim Phantom
- Steve Conte
- The Urges
- The Nervous Eaters
- The Woggles
- Wyldlife

=== Previous artists ===
- The Charms
- Crown of Thorns
- Davie Allan and the Arrows
- The Grip Weeds
- Hawaii Mud Bombers
- Jarvis Humby
- Locksley
- The Novaks
- Outrageous Cherry
- The Rascals
- The Stabilisers
