= The Breakers (Danish band) =

Danish rock band

- Also known as: The Breakers DK
- Origin: Copenhagen, Denmark
- Genres: Rock, Soul, Alternative rock
- Years active: 2002–2012
- Labels: Wicked Cool Records
- Members: Toke Nisted; Anders Bruus; Jackie Larsen
- Past members: Lukas Scherfig; Mikkel Holtoug; Mikkel Hald; Daniel Hecht; Thomas Stølsvig
- Website: http://www.thebreakers.dk/

The Breakers was a rock band from Denmark consisting of Toke Nisted (vocals), Anders Bruus (guitar), and Jackie Larsen (bass). They were influenced by the music of the 1960s and 1970s, such as The Faces and The Rolling Stones.

== History ==
The Breakers was founded in Copenhagen, Denmark in 2002. Their first album, What I Want, was released in January 2004 on Sony Denmark. Their second album, Here For A Laugh, was released in Denmark in January 2006 on Good Guy's Recording Company and later in the US and Canada in May 2007 on Funzalo Records. The US/Canada release was sent out under the name "The Breakers DK", as they had to add the "DK" to differentiate themselves from other bands named "the Breakers".

The band performed at the Danish musical festival SPOT in 2005 (SPOT11), a festival renowned for showcasing the premier Danish musical talent.

In May 2007 Steven Van Zandt named the band's first US single "Dance the Go-Go" the Coolest Song in The World on his Underground Garage radio show. The Breakers signed a record contract in June 2008 with Wicked Cool Records run and owned by Steven Van Zandt.

The band performed at South by Southwest music festival in 2009. The band closed the second stage at Hard Rock Calling on June 27, 2010 right before Paul McCartney played the main stage.

The Breakers recorded their third album in May 2010 in Stratosphere Sound in New York. Steven Van Zandt has produced the album and co-written several tracks. The album is mixed by Bob Clearmountain and is released June 6, 2011.

Continuing with their relationship with Steven van Zandt, in 2012, The Breakers appeared in S1:E6 of Lilyhammer, a Norwegian television series that stars Van Zandt and lists him as an executive producer.

The band split up in late 2012.

== Discography ==
Release date	Album name
January 2004	What I Want
January 2006	Here for a Laugh
June 6, 2011	The Breakers
January 21, 2015	The Floss Sessions
