= Bruce Springsteen Center for American Music =

Museum in New Jersey

- Front entrance to the Bruce Springsteen Center for American Music
- Location: Monmouth University; 382 Cedar Avenue; Long Branch, New Jersey, U.S.
- Coordinates: 40.2812°N 74.0028°W
- Type: Music museum
- Collections: Archives of Bruce Springsteen
- Executive director: Bob Santelli
- Director: Eileen Chapman
- Curator: Melissa Kozlowski
- Architect: COOKFOX Architects
- Website: https://springsteencenter.org

The Bruce Springsteen Center for American Music (BSCAM) is a museum, research and education center, and performance venue located in West Long Branch, New Jersey, on the campus of Monmouth University. It is dedicated to the preservation of Bruce Springsteen's archives and the study and presentation of American music. The museum features "a comprehensive collection of artifacts and materials pertaining to American music" and is named in honor of New Jersey native and resident Bruce Springsteen. The center was founded by Robert Santelli, who serves as executive director.

== History ==
The project developed from Monmouth University's collection of Springsteen-related materials and from an initiative led by music historian Robert Santelli. In 2011, a donor gave the university a collection of Springsteen memorabilia, including posters and magazine clippings. The university later expanded the collection and sought to house Springsteen's personal archive in New Jersey.

In 2016, representatives connected with the collection approached Springsteen about donating his archive. Springsteen agreed and donated his personal archives to the university in 2017. The university committed to creating a dedicated facility for the materials. The institution was renamed the Bruce Springsteen Center for American Music in January 2026. Springsteen requested that the center address American music more broadly rather than focus only on his career. COOKFOX Architects won an invited competition to design the center in 2018.

A dedication ceremony was held on June 6, 2026, following a two-night concert series on June 4 and 5, featuring performances by Springsteen, Jon Bon Jovi, Public Enemy, Little Steven Van Zandt, Sheryl Crow, and Jackson Browne, among others. The center opened on June 13.

== Collections and exhibitions ==
The center's exhibitions address Springsteen's career, his creative process, and American popular music. Displays include Springsteen and E Street Band artifacts, thematic exhibitions, and interactive materials relating to songwriting, recording, and performance. The first special exhibition, Chimes of Freedom: Protest, Patriotism, and the Power of Song, covered protest songs and related American musical traditions.

== Building and grounds ==
The 30,000-square-foot building was designed by COOKFOX Architects of New York, and was completed at a cost of $50 million. It features multiple exhibit spaces, interactive experiences, archives, and a 241-seat soundstage.

The design echoes New Jersey industrial and coastal settings. The two-story building includes a weathering-steel facade, exposed mass-timber structure, a boardwalk-style entrance, and landscaped grounds with a native coastal meadow of grasses and flowers that serve as a pollinator habitat. A variety of native trees, including juniper, tupelo, oak, and maple, as well a central “Memory Tree” (a London plane) are part of the grounds. The facility contains galleries, archival areas, a rehearsal studio, a reading room, and an auditorium used for films, concerts, lectures, and public events.

== Programs and music education ==
The center offers concerts, lectures, film screenings, workshops, conferences, symposia, oral history events, and K-12 musical educational programs. It also provides research access to archival material related to Springsteen and American music.

A central purpose of BSCAM is to provide music education and outreach for K–12 students, including curriculum resources, school visits, workshops, and programs developed with educators. The center also partners with TeachRock, which provides free, music-based K–12 lesson plans and classroom materials integrating American music with subjects including history, social studies, and literature.

== Performance venue ==
The center has a 241-seat Dolby Atmos-certified theater with tiered seating and stage.

== Visiting ==
BSCAM is located at 382 Cedar Avenue in West Long Branch, New Jersey, on the campus of Monmouth University. Visiting hours, admission information, and ticketing details are published on the center's official website.

== See also ==
- List of museums in New Jersey
- Institute of Jazz Studies, described as world's largest jazz-related library and archive, at Rutgers University.
- List of New Jersey music venues by capacity
- Music of Asbury Park
- Mason Gross School of the Arts at Rutgers University
- North to Shore Festival
- The Aquarian Weekly
- The Turf Club
- Asbury Park Convention Hall
- The Stone Pony
