= Saint Valentine's Day massacre (disambiguation) =

The Saint Valentine's Day Massacre is a gang shooting that occurred on Saint Valentine's Day, February 14, 1929 in Chicago, USA.

St. Valentine's Day massacre may also refer to:

== Events ==
- The 1349 Strasbourg massacre, part of the Black Death persecutions
- The 1943 World War II attack on Kahili Airfield resulting in US loss of aircraft (Vought F4U Corsair#Marine Corps combat)
- The 1951 middleweight boxing match between Sugar Ray Robinson and Jake LaMotta, the sixth contest between the two
- The two-day firefight in 1970 during the Vietnam War that claimed the lives of 13 American soldiers and more than 30 North Vietnamese fighters
- The 1977 mass shooting in Hollandsburg, Indiana, U.S.
- The Behmai massacre in Uttar Pradesh, India on February 14, 1981.
- St. Valentine's Day Massacre: In Your House, a 1999 professional wrestling event
- 2008 Northern Illinois University shooting which occurred in a college in DeKalb, Illinois on February 14, 2008
- Parkland high school shooting, which occurred in Parkland, Florida on February 14, 2018
- 2019 Pulwama attack, which occurred in Pulwama, Jammu and Kashmir, on February 14, 2019
- 2024 Kansas City parade shooting, which occurred in Kansas City, Missouri on February 14, 2024
- 2025 United States federal mass layoffs, which impacted thousands of probationary employees in the federal government

== Entertainment ==
- St. Valentine's Day Massacre (band), formerly known as The Artwoods, a mid-1960s British band
- The St. Valentine's Day Massacre (film), a 1967 film
- St. Valentine's Day Massacre (EP), a 1981 EP by Motörhead and Girlschool
- The Massacre, originally called The St. Valentine's Day Massacre, a 2005 album by 50 Cent
- Saint Valentine's Day Massacre, a 2009 album by Cocktail Slippers
  - Saint Valentine's Day Massacre, the title track of the 2009 album by Cocktail Slippers
- "Valentine's Day Massacre" (Dawson's Creek), a 2000 television episode
- "Valentine's Day Massacre" (Grey's Anatomy), a 2010 television episode

== See also ==
- Valentine's Day (disambiguation)
