= The Launderettes =

Norwegian garage rock band

The Launderettes is an all girl garage rock band from Oslo, Norway. The band has been around since 1996, and over the years they have toured both the US and Europe, and released several albums and singles. Since 2007, the band has been signed to Steven Van Zandt's label, Wicked Cool Records.

Their genre was described by AllMusic as "driving, sexy, and high-energy revivalist garage rock".

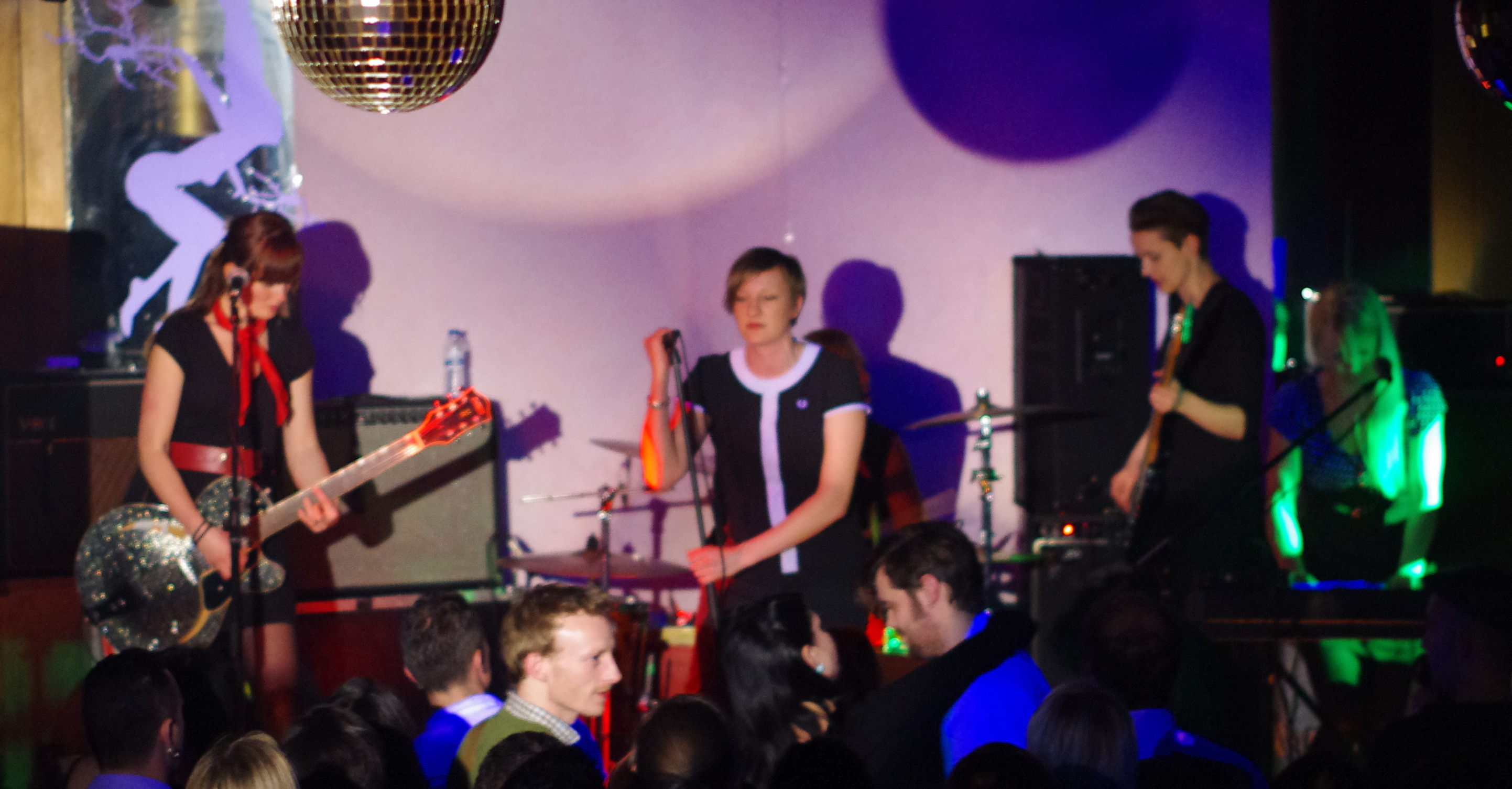
The Launderettes playing the States Club, Coimbra, 3 April 2011

Among their curious live jobs was an afternoon gig in Ila Prison in 2005.

== Reception ==
=== Shaken And Disturbed ===
Shaken And Disturbed was released by Big Dipper in May 2002. The record got some moderately positive reviews, including a dice throw of 4 in Østlendingen. Fredrik Wandrup praised the speed and energy. "The girls are confident within the mysteries of garage rock, and have a real clenched-fist drive of feminine punching power". Monotony towards the end of the record contributed to the grading being 4 out of 6 here as well. Aftenposten Aften concluded that Shaken and Disturbed might be "the perfect vorspiel record", but also deducted points for lack of variation, landing on a 4 too. Bad reviews came in Glåmdalen, with a dice throw of 2, citing "an embarrassing lack of good songs".

VG gave a dice throw of 3 as The Launderettes released Take Me to the Race in 2003, the reviewer citing a lack of "party factor" while "not having the greatest of songs".

=== Every Heart is a Time Bomb ===
The same grade was given to Every Heart is a Time Bomb. VG's reviewer felt The Launderettes failed in their attempts to be "innovative and exciting" on this record, and the songs were "uneven". There were some catchy and exciting songs, however. Though the album held a "high standard" musically speaking, the jettisoning of some of the rock characteristics, as well as vocals with "not enough attitude", gave the band less "authority", wrote Bergens Tidende. The band should be "sassier" and should "succeed better in finding an own sound". Avisa Nordland gave a dice throw of 3 to Every Heart Is A Time Bomb too, as did Moss Avis.

Several graded this record as 4 out of 6. Aftenposten's Asbjørn Bakke concluded that the band's garage rock was updated with somewhat more contemporary references, but that they were still constrained by having one foot in the 1960s. Compared to the previous album, The Launderettes were less scruffy and an "open, clear soundscape". The album opened with great songs, but had "a certain downward curve" later on. Contrary to many others, Varden wrote that the song "Connecting the Dots" was "too tame" and liked the tougher, rawer and more aggressive expressions. Telemarksavisa called it "vital" and "cheeky", and also gave a 4, as did Drammens Tidende and Dagsavisen. Another 4 out of 6 in Demokraten was motivated by the "1960s delicate details" in their music, though Shaken and Disturbed was better. Sarpsborg Arbeiderblad was very positive, however, stating that the only drawback was the track order. Asked the reviewer, "Why do The Donnas get so much attention when The Launderettes are so much better?"

Dagbladet gave a dice throw of 5, citing that the newly added elements of pop music and surf rock gave the band a more "grown-up" tinge. Production-wise, they had managed to produce a more "dynamic" sound, their soundscape "more open, cleaner and warmer".

== Members ==
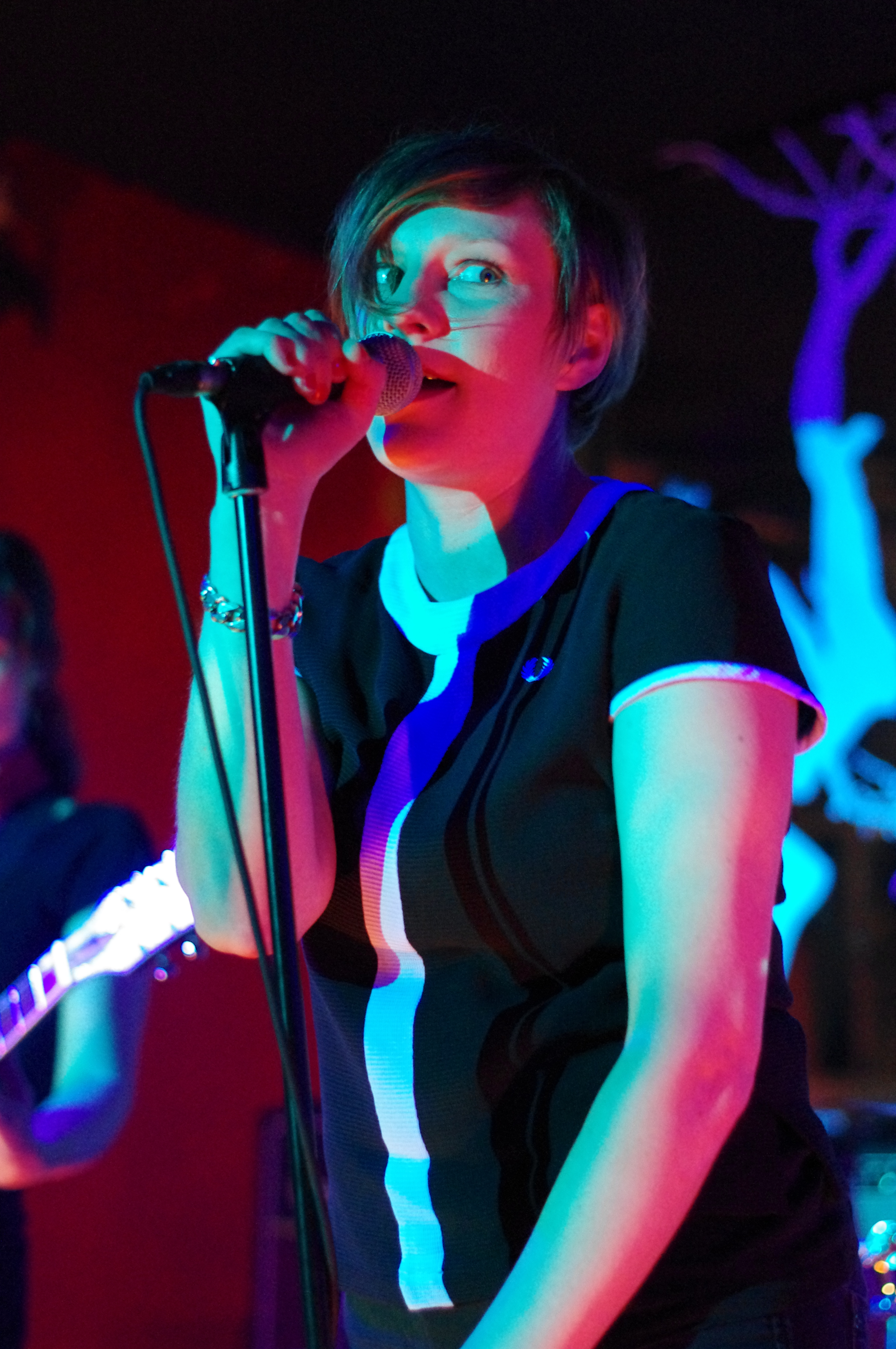
Ingvild Nordang (lead vocals)

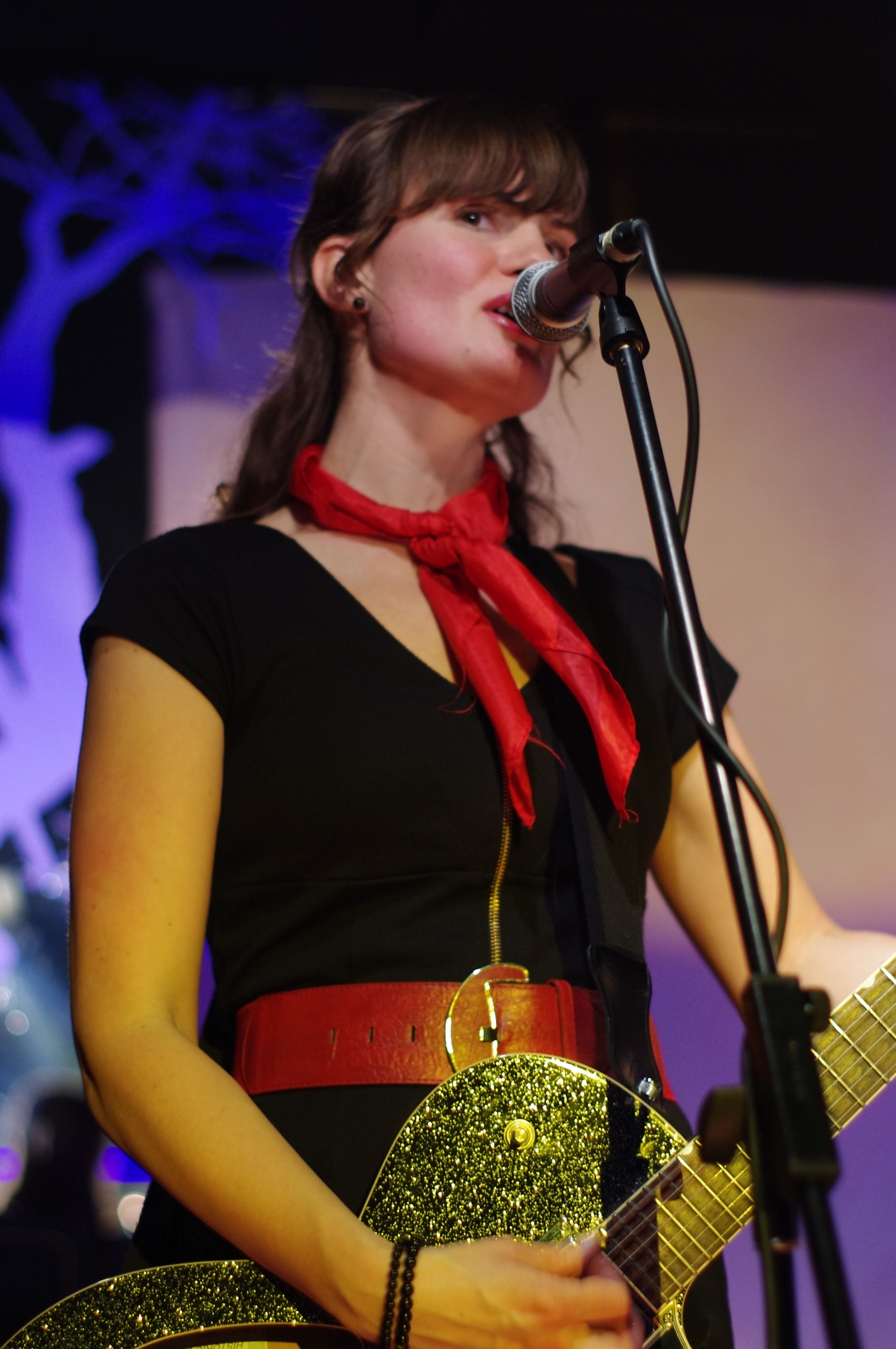
Linda Kastbakken (guitar, backing vocals)

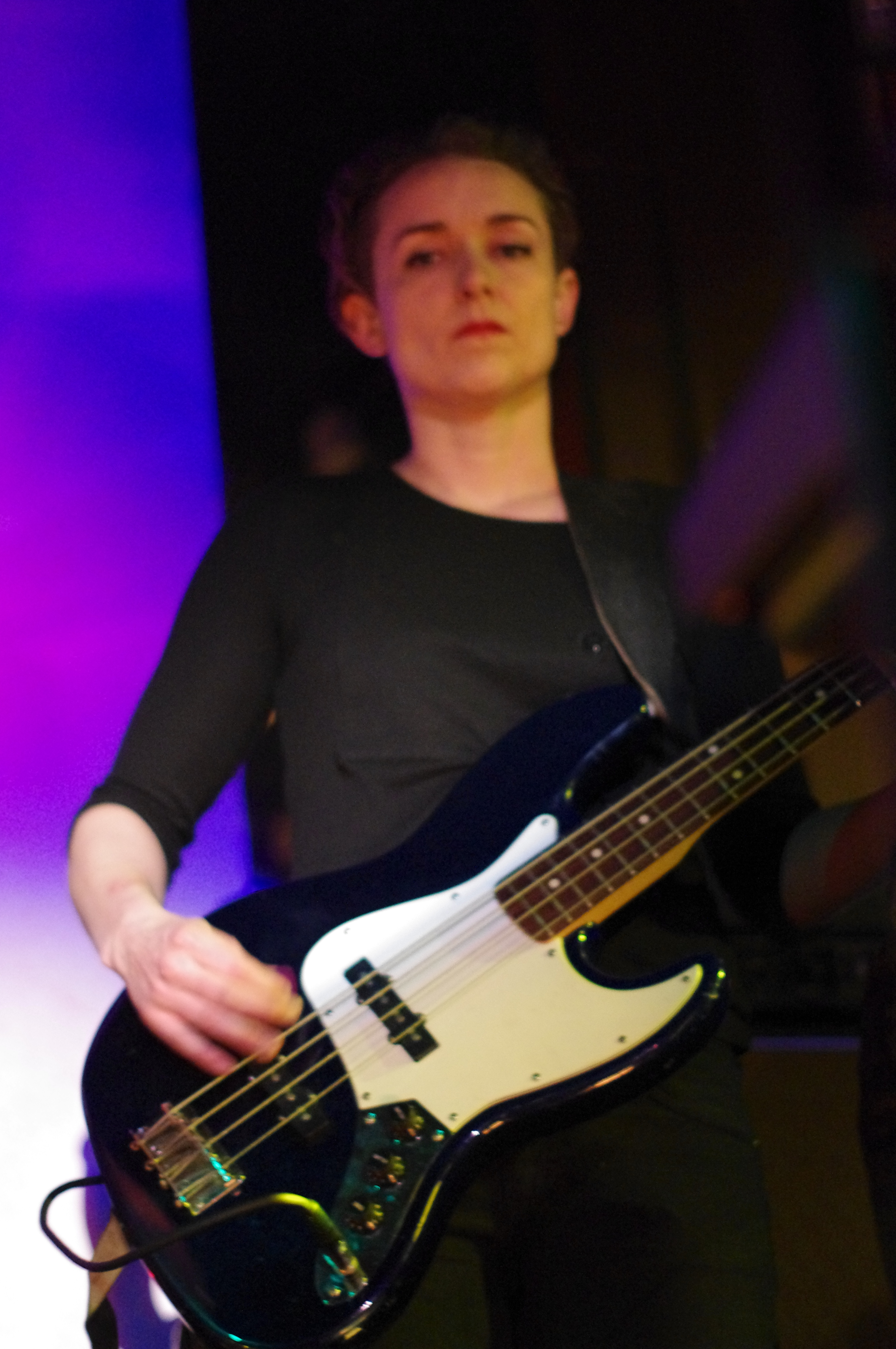
Johanne Hjorthol (bass)

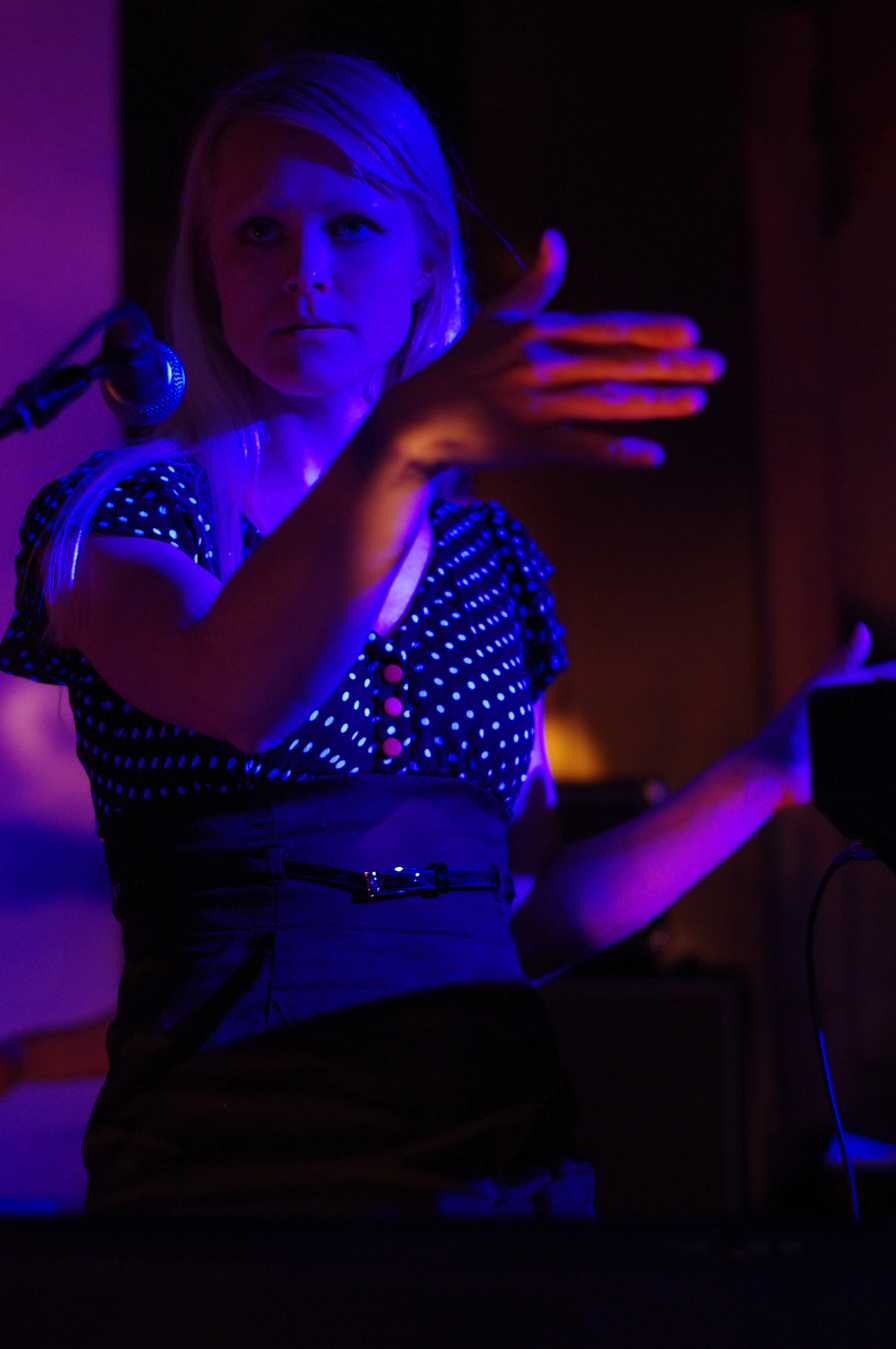
Mona Varpe Helleland (organ/piano/theremin/backing vocals)

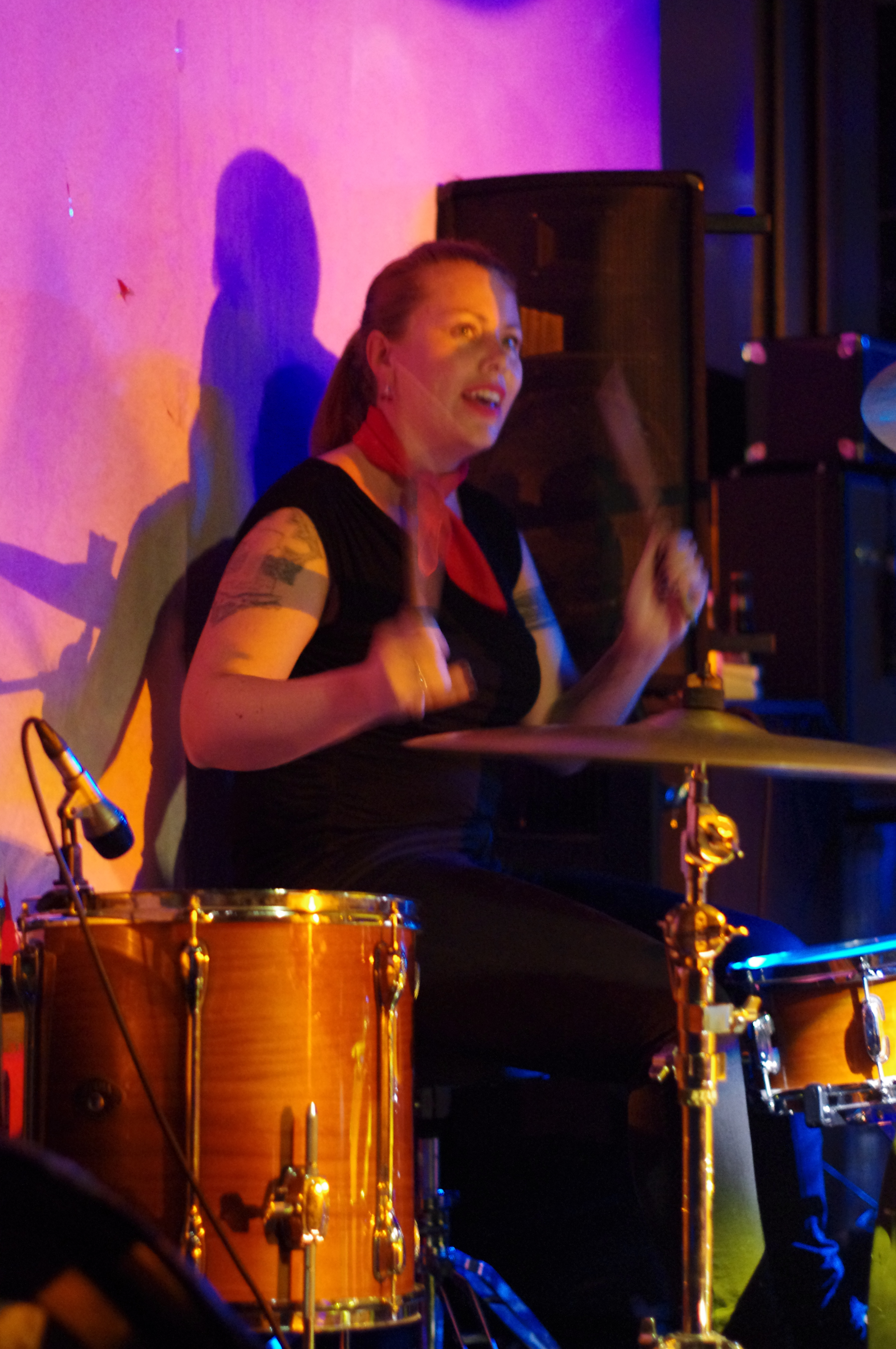
Cecilie Asker (drums)

== Discography ==
=== Albums and EPs ===
- Shaken And Disturbed (Big Dipper, 2002)
- Take Me To The Race EP (Big Dipper, 2003)
- Every Heart Is A Time Bomb (EP, Big Dipper, 2005)
- Fluff 'N' Fold – The Best Of The Launderettes (Wicked Cool Records, 2007)
- Getaway (Wicked Cool Records, 2013)

=== Singles ===
- Rebel Love (Sneakers Records, 2000)
- I Wanna Jump Your Bones (Thunderbaby Records, 2000)
- Live at Tikis (Launderama Records, 2001)
- Devil Dolls Tour 2001 (Low Impact Records, 2002)
- Red River (Wicked Cool Records, 2011)
- The Beat Dropped (Wicked Cool Records, 2011)
- Marks On My Map (Wicked Cool Records, 2012)

== Related Bands ==
Linda Kastbakken (alias Linderella) is the lead singer and guitarist in the all-girl power trio The High Tension Girls along with drummer Plingis from Mensen and bassist Lucky Lise from The Pumps (Oslo).
