= The Urges =

Irish psychedelic garage rock band

The Urges are a psychedelic garage rock music group from Dublin, Ireland.

== Group Members ==
- Jim Walters - Lead vocal, Guitar
- Peter Smith - Lead guitar & backing vocals
- Ken Mooney - Drums & backing vocals
- Ross McGee - Bass guitar
- Thomas D'Arcy - Organ

Past Members:

- Glen Lee Flynn
- Gary Clarke

== Band history ==
The Urges were formed in Dublin, Ireland in 2003. In 2004 they played the Oxegen festival's 'new band' stage and shortly afterwards recruited drummer Ken Mooney. Their debut single "Around and (Around Again)" was produced by Pete Holadai of The Radiators From Space. It reached number 20 in the Irish singles charts. The B-side "Jenny Jenny" was later included on the Parisian "Gloria Club" compilation alongside The Chesterfield Kings and The Hives.

In 2005, The Urges added organ playing to their sound and used reverb extensively. After scrapping their first attempts at a studio album, they began to record a number of lo-fi home recordings which grabbed the attention of promoters throughout Europe where they began to build a steady fanbase. In August 2006 The Urges were invited to play the Primitive festival of garage music in Rotterdam where they met Jorge Explosion of Circo Perrotti studios.

They started work on their debut LP, Psych Ward, at the end of November at Jorge's analogue studio in Gijon, Spain. After five days of recording and a rushed mix they played the Purple Weekend festival at the Estadio Hispánico in León, Spain alongside Kula Shaker and The Electric Prunes. After another mix the album was released in October 2007 on Screaming Apple, Off the Hip and Stomping Ground record labels to positive reviews worldwide.

On top of the success of Psych Ward The Urges went to New York to play the Cavestomp festival which saw the return of The Sonics and The Alarm Clocks. After Cavestomp they played a number of gigs across the city and traveled to New Jersey where they recorded a live radio session for Joe Belocks show on WFMU.

The Urges signed to Little Steven Van Zandt's Wicked Cool record label in New York in 2008. Psych Ward was re-released in September, featuring the "Jenny Jenny" the B-side of "Around and (Around Again)". The vinyl release featured a bonus CD containing the album plus "Around" and the previously unreleased "Don't Lead Me On" from the recordings of their scrapped album. They recorded a session for Dan Hegarty's 2FM radio show that summer followed by an appearance at The Electric Picnic which was also recorded for 2FM and recorded a session for Mark Lamarr's radio show on BBC2 in November.

In April 2012, the band released their single "Fire Burning" B/W "I've Been Here Before" on 7" vinyl and CD on Northern Irish based independent label Mersol Music. The single reached number 7 in a chart for physical singles sales.

In April 2015, The Urges released another single, taken from their forthcoming second album. "Passing Us By" B/W "Corners Of Her Mind" was released on a limited edition 7" vinyl format on the Mersol Music label as an official release for Record Store Day 2015 in the UK and Ireland. The release of this single brought the band considerable local media attention and reviews in many international music publications as well as having a high level of online coverage.

== Discography ==
- (Around &) Around Again Single 2005
  1. "Around and (Around Again)"
  2. "Jenny Jenny"
  3. "Goodbye"
- Psych-Ward LP (Screaming Apple Records) 2007
  Side 1
  1. "Read the Signs"
  2. "You're Gonna Find Out"
  3. "It's Ain't Right"
  4. "You Don't Look So Good"
  5. "Salvaje"
  6. "The 13th Floor"
  Side 2
  1. "The Urges Theme"
  2. "So Uptight"
  3. "I Gotta Wait"
  4. "Curse It All"
  5. "Psych Ward"
- Split single with Hollywood Sinners (Dirty Water Records) 2008
- Psych-Ward CD (Wicked Cool Records) 2008
  1. "Jenny Jenny"
  2. "I Gotta Wait"
  3. "You Don't Look So Good"
  4. "It's Ain't Right"
  5. "You're Gonna Find Out"
  6. "The 13th Floor"
  7. "Salvaje"
  8. "So Uptight"
  9. "The Urges Theme"
  10. "Read the Signs"
  11. "Curse It All"
  12. "Psych Ward"
- Time Will Pass LP 2016
  1. "Passing Us By"
  2. "Echoes Softly"
  3. "I've Been Here Before"
  4. "A Face Made for Sorrow"
  5. "In the End (The End is All)"
  6. "Find Another Way"
  7. "Now I See"
  8. "Strangers"
  9. "Meanwhile"
  10. "Time Will Pass"

== Tours ==
- US Tour 2007
- Spanish Tour 2008
- European Tour 2008
- US and Mexican Tour 2009 (including SXSW Festival)
- European Tour 2010
