= Palmyra Delran =

American musician

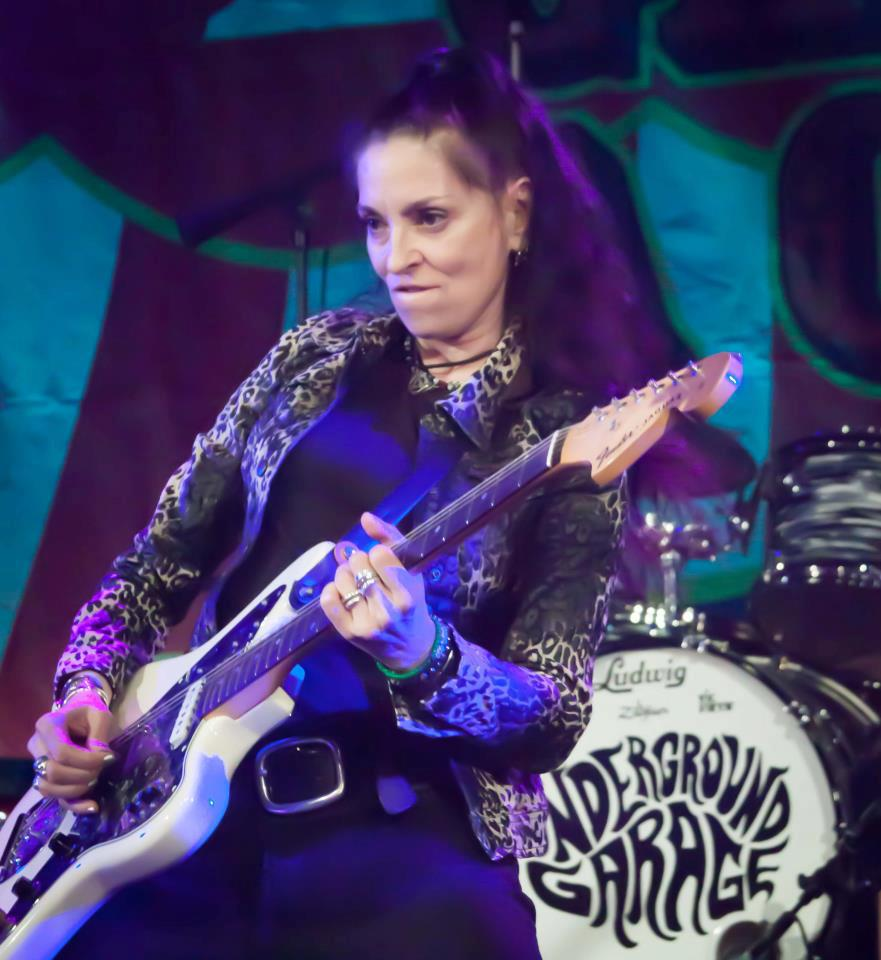

Background information
- Born: Princeton, New Jersey, June 2, 1965 United States
- Genres: Rock and roll, surf, trash-pop
- Occupations: Songwriter, singer, producer
- Instruments: Vocals, guitar, drums
- Years active: Late 1980s – present
- Labels: Apex Recording Service, Skyclad, Get Hip, Sympathy for the Record Industry, Apex East Recordings
- Website: www.palmyradelran.com

Palmyra Delran is an American rock and roll musician, songwriter, guitarist and producer who was born in Princeton, New Jersey, and later moved to Philadelphia. She played in seminal 1990s Philadelphia-area rock bands The Friggs and Pink Slip Daddy, as well as several of her own solo releases and recordings.

Little Steven Van Zandt was a reported fan of Delran's previous band, the Friggs, and attended their 2008 NYC reunion show. After striking up a conversation with Palmyra, he learned of her new six-track solo EP She Digs the Ride. He added it to the Little Steven's Underground Garage playlist, picking "Baby Should Have Known Better" as a "Coolest Song in the World This Week", followed by radio listeners voting it "Coolest Song in the World" for 2008, which gained Delran considerable attention for her efforts.

The EP was followed up in 2013 with You Are What You Absorb, Delran's first full-length solo effort. The album included the single "You’re My Brian Jones", featuring a music video directed by Daniel Henry, and shot on location in Nashville. Little Steven continued his support of Delran's work, voting "You're My Brian Jones" his No. 1 song of the year. In 2013, the songs "Shy Boy" and "Some Day Soon" ranked among favorites on Steven's and many Underground Garage DJ lists. Steven also voted the full album You Are What You Absorb as the No. 3 best record of 2013.

Delran tours the East Coast, Scandinavia, and the West Coast each year, and released a new single in spring/summer of 2014, "Run Now Baby" b/w "Yeah Yeah Yeah." The single was recorded in LA with Dave Klein & Bubble Gun, and features special guest Kim Shattuck from The Muffs.

== Previous Acts ==
=== Pink Slip Daddy ===
Delran was born in Princeton, New Jersey, and later moved to Philadelphia, where she met musician and rock critic Mike Ferguson, formerly of the group Sickidz!. The two began playing together under the name Das Yahoos, with Delran on drums, as well as members Robbie Rip-Rock (Rob Windfelder of the group Live Not On Evil) on guitar, and Clams Casino (Mark Fletcher) on bass. The band would break up in 1988, but Ferguson and Delran quickly formed a new band, called Pink Slip Daddy, adding Barb Dwyer on bass and Ben Vaughn (performing as Sal Mineo's Only Son) on guitar.

Pink Slip Daddy toured for several years, releasing a number of records on Apex East, Get Hip, and Sympathy for the Record Industry to critical praise before going on hiatus in 1993. The band reunited in 2013 for one show, and have indicated potential reunion dates in the future.

=== The Friggs ===
In 1991, Delran formed The Friggs, a project featuring Barb Dwyer, as well as guitarist, vocalist, and co-songwriter Jezebel. Playing a blend of sleaze-pop, rock, surf and punk, the band was critically and commercially embraced, touring almost non-stop for 10 years. The band has shared the bill with rock legends the Ramones, Cheap Trick, The Selecter, Dick Dale, The Fleshtones, Southern Culture on the Skids, and many more. Other members have included Petula Wilde, J. Whitey Smythe, Ginga Moon, Janey West, Suki Von Trapp, Kami, Lexi Plumm, Kitten LaChaCha, and Mitzi Dodge.

The Friggs’ music has appeared in a number of films, including Superbad, Jawbreaker, Prey for Rock and Roll, Lipstick and Dynamite, and The Treasures of Long Gone John.

After a number of EP's, 7 inch singles and compilations, the band released the album Rock Candy in 1997, and continued touring through 2001, when the band went on an indefinite break. In 2007, the band released Today is Tomorrow's Yesterday, a compilation of unreleased songs and past singles from the band.

== Various Projects ==
=== KinderAngst ===
Written in collaboration with fellow songwriter Rachelle Garniez, KinderAngst, an album of punk and rock 'n' roll songs for kids was released in 2012. The album, produced by Delran and Garniez, featured 14 songs dedicated to the stresses and challenges of being a child, and using music to express their feelings. KinderAngst also features an appearance by Debbie Harry of Blondie.

=== Booty Olympics/Santa Marias ===
Delran played drums in the Booty Olympics in the early 2000s, who released Boystyle in 2003. The band later changed their name to Santa Marias, and released a self-titled CD in 2007.

=== The Coolies ===
In 2019, Palmyra Delran co-founded the female pop-punk supergroup The Coolies alongside her longtime friends Kim Shattuck (frontwoman of The Muffs and bassist for The Pandoras) and Melanie Vammen (also of The Pandoras and formerly of The Muffs). The group released a six-song benefit EP titled Uh Oh! It’s… The Coolies, which was backed by Little Steven Van Zandt’s Wicked Cool Records and raised over $15,000 for ALS research in honor of Shattuck, who died later that year. The EP included some of Kim’s final recordings, making it a meaningful and memorable release for fans and collaborators alike.

=== Sirius XM Broadcasting ===
Palmyra has continued to champion garage rock and punk through her work as a host on Little Steven’s Underground Garage. Her show, Palmyra’s Trash-Pop Shindig, airs Mondays and Tuesdays from 4pm-7pm, Wednesdays and Thursdays from 8 pm to midnight ET and Saturdays 8am to 10 am, Sundays from noon until 2pm ET. In December 2019, she co-hosted a special live broadcast of Jesse Malin’s Sunset Kids album release show at New York’s Bowery Ballroom, alongside Outlaw Country’s Mojo Nixon. The event, which featured a performance of the album in its entirety and appearances by special guests including Grammy Award-winning artist Lucinda Williams, aired live on SiriusXM’s Underground Garage and Outlaw Country channels.

== Releases ==
=== Palmyra Delran Solo Releases ===
==== CDs ====
You Are What You Absorb – Produced by Palmyra Delran
Apex East Recordings – 12 track CD (2013)

She Digs the Ride – Produced by Palmyra Delran
Apex East Recordings – 6 Song EP (2008)

==== COMPILATIONS ====
Little Steven's Underground Garage Coolest Songs in the World, Vol 8
Wicked Cool – 1 song (2009)

=== The Friggs ===
==== CDs ====
Today Is Tomorrow's Yesterday – Produced by Ben Vaughn
Apex East Recording – 15 song CD (2007)

Rock Candy – Produced by Dave O'Donnell
e-vil records – 10 song CD (1997)

==== VINYL SINGLES & EP's ====
Juiced Up b/w Mama Blew a Hoody – Produced by Dave O'Donnell
Feralette Records – 7" single (1995)

America's Only Rock & Roll Magazine Parody 10" EP – Produced by Ben Vaughn
Sympathy for the Record Industry – 4 songs (1994)

Shake b/w Wild Love – Produced by Ben Vaughn
Sympathy for the Record Industry – 7" single (1992)

Bad Word for a Good Thing b/w Friggs Theme – Produced by Ben Vaughn
Telstar Records – 7" single (1992)

Come Now b/w Dance of Love – Produced by Ben Vaughn
Apex Recording Service – 7" single (1991)

==== COMPILATIONS ====
Music to Read Carbon 14 By vol. 1 compilation
C14 Records – 1 song (2005)

How Many Bands Does It Take to Screw Up a Blondie Tribute
Sympathy for the Record Industry – 1 song (2004)

Alright, This Time Just the Girls compilation
Sympathy for the Record Industry – 1 song (2004)

Their Sympathetic Majesties Request vol. 2 compilation
Sympathy for the Record Industry – 1 song (2003)

Jawbreaker Movie soundtrack CD
London Records – 1 song (1998)

Their Sympathetic Majesties Request vol. 1 compilation
Sympathy for the Record Industry – 1 song (1998)

Today's Top Girl Groups, Vol.1 – Produced by Ben Vaughn
Spinout Records – 1 song (1998)

Season's Greetings Philadelphia Christmas compilation
Record Cellar Records – 1 song (1997)

Turban Renewal – Sam the Sham tribute LP/CD – Produced by Bruce Bennett
Norton Records – 1 song (1994)

Carbon 14 Magazine Give Away EP – Produced by Ben Vaughn
C14 Records – 1 song (1994)

=== Pink Slip Daddy ===
==== LPs & CDs ====
Rock Damage and Other Love Songs – Produced by Ben Vaughn
Sympathy for the Record Industry – 13 song LP/CD (1993)

Antidisestablishmentarianism – Produced by Ben Vaughn
Apex Recording Service – 13 song LP /CD (1990)

Pink Slip Daddy – Produced by Ben Vaughn
Apex Recording Service – 10 song LP (1988)

==== VINYL SINGLES & EP's ====
L.S.D. 10" EP – Produced by Ben Vaughn
Apex Recording Service – 4 song 10" EP (1989)

Junkyard b/w Live Sex & Violence – Produced by Ben Vaughn
Sympathy for the Record Industry – 7" single (1991)

Rock Old Sputnik to the Moon b/w Shaggy Dog – Produced by Ben Vaughn
Get Hip Records – 7" single (1991)

=== With Bubble Gun ===
==== CD single ====
Run Now Baby b/w Yeah, Yeah, Yeah – Produced by Palmyra Delran & Dave Klein
9 Volt Jolt Records – 2 song CD (2014)

==== COMPILATIONS ====
Their Sympathetic Majesties Request vol.1 compilation – Produced by Ben Vaughn
Sympathy for the Record Industry – 1 song (1998)

the Singer Not the Song Alex Chilton Tribute CD – Produced by Ben Vaughn
Munster Records – 1 song (1992)

Bonograph Sonny Bono Tribute CD – Produced by Ben Vaughn
Bogus Records – 1 song (1991)

== Music videos ==
Lies For You – Created by John Valentine & eM*L*E
Shut Out – Created by John Valentine & eM*L*E
You’re My Brian Jones – Directed by Daniel Henry, Produced by Price Harrison, Cinematography by Dustin Lane
The Making Of You’re My Brian Jones – Created by Price Harrison
The Turtle – Created by Palmyra Delran

== Palmyra Delran Touring Bands ==
=== East Coast ===
Palmyra: Vocals, Guitar
Michael Lynch: Bass, Vocals
Bob Wojciechowski: Guitar, Vocals
Mark Brotter: Drums

=== West Coast ===
BUBBLE GUN
Palmyra: Vocals, Guitar
John Carlucci: Bass
Laura Carlucci: Keyboards, Vocals
Michelle Balderrama: Guitar, Vocals
Rikki Styxx: Drums, Vocals

=== Scandinavia ===
STUPIDITY
Palmyra: Vocals, Guitar
Erniz: Backing Vocals, Percussion
PA: Guitar, Vocals
Miss Anna: Bass
Tommy Boy: Drums
