= The Aquarian Weekly =

Newspaper in New Jersey, US

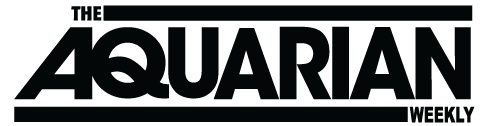
- Type: Alternative weekly
- Format: Tabloid
- Owner(s): Arts Weekly, Inc.
- Founder: James Rensenbrink
- Publisher: Diane Casazza, Chris Farinas
- Editor: Valentino Petrarca
- Founded: 1969
- Headquarters: Little Falls, New Jersey, U.S.
- Price: USD 2.00
- Website: theaquarian.com

The Aquarian Weekly is a regional alternative weekly newspaper based in Little Falls, New Jersey. Founded in 1969, it covers rock music and related news and events in New Jersey, New York City, and the Lehigh Valley region of eastern Pennsylvania.

From 1986 to 1992, it was called East Coast Rocker. After returning to its original title, the newspaper began including a pull-out section that retained the East Coast Rocker name, and which is now freely distributed throughout the region. The paper has remained independently owned and operated throughout its existence.

== History ==
Cover of the July 27, 1983 issue of The Aquarian Weekly

James Rensenbrink (1932–2013), a former employee of two New Jersey newspapers and one Louisiana newspaper, founded The Aquarian in 1969. The Aquarian initially concentrated on radical politics and uncompromising ecological writings, raging against media monopolies as well as antiquated marijuana laws.

In the beginning, The Aquarian promoted hippie culture and healthy lifestyles, dropping issues sporadically from 1969 to 1974 at the cost of 15 cents per issue in 1969, 10 cents by 1971, then becoming free by 1972. In 1973, The Aquarian hit stride, mixing its sociopolitical views and drug culture coverage with new popular music features, as well as covering underground nightspots like CBGB.

The October 1973 issue included a photo of Mick Jagger on its cover, an in-depth interview with the Eagles, and a review of the Allman Brothers Band at Trenton's State Fairgrounds. The February 20, 1974, issue had a pink-hued front cover, while the next issue on March 14, 1974, featured an out-of-shape man in blue and red Superman cape plus the first Classified section, bringing a stabilized 25-cent price to customers. By 1977, The Aquarian became a full-time weekly at a cost of 50 cents.

By January 5, 1983, East Coast Rocker provided full-time music coverage inside The Aquarian while the concurrent New York Arts Weekly concentrated on non-music items and poetry for its strictly New York City audience. On July 18, 1984, the first "Records in Review" section appeared, rating new recordings on a scale of 1 to 10. For issue 614, dated February 12, 1986, The Aquarian changed to a smaller, more accessible 8x12 size. By issue 623 (April 16, 1986), The Aquarian proudly boasted that it was currently "The Only Weekly Music Newspaper in the U.S."

An important historical date was July 16, 1986, when issue 637 temporarily marked the end of The Aquarian in favor of the more conveniently named East Coast Rocker, offering its first issue on July 23, 1986.

The publication changed back to its Aquarian Weekly handle on October 21, 1992, resuming at issue 638 following 326 weekly editions as East Coast Rocker.

In the wake of the coronavirus pandemic, Arts Weekly stopped print production of The Aquarian in 2020. Since then, they have been solely online at theaquarian.com.

In August of 2022, Valentino Petrarca took over as editor-in-chief of the magazine.

== Notable former staff ==
- Clifford Meth, contributing writer
- Vin Scelsa, fiction
- Jeff Tamarkin, "On the Island"

== See also ==
- New Jersey music venues by capacity
- Bruce Springsteen Center for American Music at Monmouth University
