= Underground Garage =

Sirius XM satellite radio channel

- Broadcast area: United States; Canada
- Frequencies: Sirius XM Radio 21; Dish Network 6021

Programming
- Format: FreeForm/Little Steven's Underground Garage

Ownership
- Owner: Renegade Nation

Technical information
- Class: Satellite Radio Station

Links
- Website: SiriusXM: Underground Garage

Underground Garage is the name of two different related radio outlets that present rock and roll and garage rock on radio: a syndicated show and a satellite radio station. Steven Van Zandt, best known as a guitarist in Bruce Springsteen's E Street Band, is the founder and supervisor of both outlets. Both play a mixture of past and current garage rock.

== Station overview, shows ==
=== Little Steven's Underground Garage ===
The weekly syndicated radio show broadcasts under the full title Little Steven's Underground Garage, and can be heard on over 200 terrestrial FM radio stations in 130 major cities in the United States, and outside the US. The two-hour show is written, hosted, and produced by Van Zandt. The program began in April 2002 on about 30 US radio stations, and it has since emerged as one of the fastest-growing syndicated music radio programs. It is heard by approximately one million listeners in the US each week, and is currently distributed by Premiere Networks.

=== Underground Garage radio channel ===
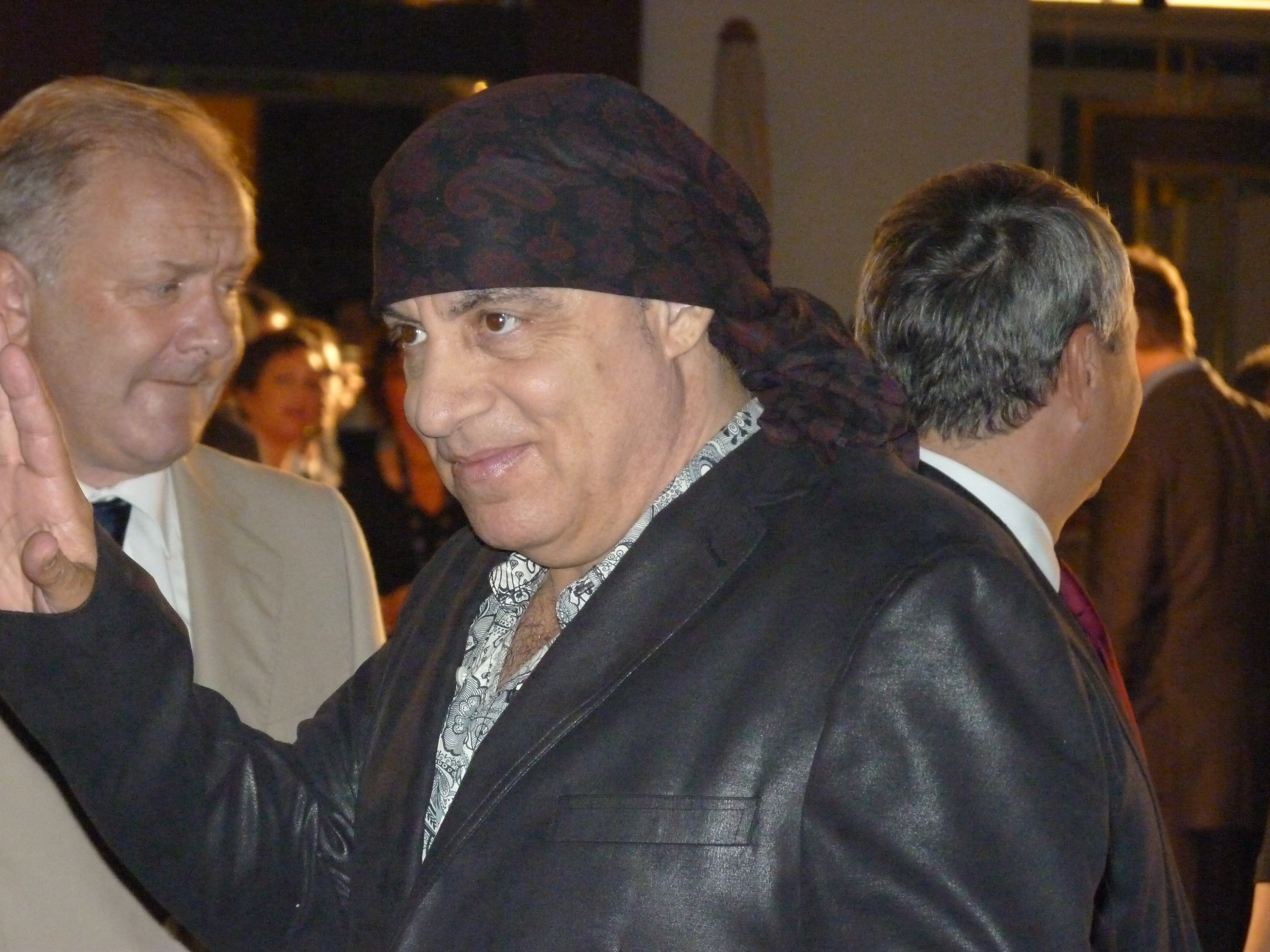
Host Steven Van Zandt, known as a guitarist and actor on The Sopranos

Underground Garage is a 24-hour satellite radio channel heard in the USA and Canada on Sirius XM Radio channel 21 and via Dish Network satellite TV, and heard worldwide on Sirius/XM Internet Radio. The radio channel is an extension of Van Zandt's own weekly radio show and shares the same philosophy.

The radio channel is programmed and run by Van Zandt, and hosted by a team of personalities hand picked by Van Zandt. On-air hosts on the channel have included original Rolling Stones manager/producer Andrew Loog Oldham, Mark Lindsay of Paul Revere and the Raiders, punk rock singer Handsome Dick Manitoba, Manfred Jones of the Woggles, Palmyra Delran of the Friggs, Stray Cats drummer Slim Jim Phantom, New York singer/songwriter Jesse Malin, television actor Michael Des Barres, Ko Melina of Ko and the Knockouts, Kelly Ogden of the Dollyrots, veteran FM radio DJs Rodney Bingenheimer, Kid Leo, and Bill Kelly, rock entrepreneur Kim Fowley, actor Drew Carey, and musician/producer Genya Ravan of Goldie & the Gingerbreads. "Chris Carter's British Invasion", hosted by Chris Carter, appears on the channel on weekends.

On March 24, 2023, Drew Carey experimented with an AI of his voice, using a beta version of ElevenLabs and ChatGPT-generated jokes. He concluded that the audience still prefers a genuine personality since the listeners complained that the voice sounded "soulless" and unlike the "real Drew".

=== Live shows ===
Little Steven's Underground Garage periodically co-sponsors shows, and two events in late April 2014 featured bands with "Coolest Songs", including the Connection, John & Brittany, the Jellybricks, and Palmyra Delran. The shows were hosted by Underground Garage DJ Handsome Dick Manitoba.

== Approach to music history ==
The music format of the weekly radio show and the 24/7 satellite radio channel is based on Van Zandt's approach to rock 'n' roll history. Van Zandt believes that rock 'n' roll is a continuum of the early 1950s sound onward and that it is artificial and counter-productive to isolate music by the decade it was created. The Underground Garage presents music from every decade since the beginnings of rock 'n' roll in the early 1950s to the present day. However, some would argue rock and roll was created before the term was coined in the 50's and instead created in the 1940s by pioneering artists like Sister Rosetta Tharpe and Buddy Jones in 1939.

Stylistically, the format's offerings span such genres and categories as garage rock, acid rock, girl groups, British Invasion, psychedelic music, rockabilly, surf rock, Motown, proto-punk, power pop and punk rock. The music is integrated for listeners to hear recordings by rock pioneers such as Chuck Berry, Bo Diddley, Little Richard and Elvis Presley juxtaposed with records by present-day garage bands like the Contrast as well as multiple artists from in-between.

Van Zandt has stated that he hopes to draw younger listeners to the historic acts that paved the way for today's rock, and older listeners to discover the modern artists in the genre. He has described the format playlist as featuring "the bands that influenced the Ramones, the bands that were influenced by the Ramones, and the Ramones".

== "The Coolest Song in the World This Week" ==
On both the Sirius XM channel and the syndicated show, one song is proclaimed as "The Coolest Song in the World This Week". At the end of 2006, listeners were invited to choose among the 52 songs to pick the year's best. The 2006 results are:

1. The Woggles: "It's Not About What I Want"
2. The Charms: "So Romantic"
3. Anderson Council: "Pinkerton's Assorted Colours"
4. Primal Scream: "Country Girl"
5. New York Dolls: "Dance Like A Monkey"
6. The Shys: "Never Gonna Die"
7. Joan Jett & The Blackhearts: "Everyone Knows"
8. The Raconteurs: "Steady, As She Goes"
9. The Maggots: "King Of The Freaks"
10. The Holograms: "Are You Ready For It"

The same concept was applied in 2009, with listeners voting at the end of the year for their favorite "Coolest Song in the World This Week". The 2009 results are:

1. The Noisettes: "Never Forget You"
2. Tinted Windows: "Take me Back"
3. The Doughboys: "I'm Not Your Man"
4. The Raveonettes: "Last Dance"
5. The Chesterfield Kings: "Up and Down"
6. Locksley: "There's a Love"
7. The Yum Yums: "Too Good to be True"
8. The Verbs: "Burnt Out Star"
9. Cocktail Slippers: "St. Valentine's Day Massacre"
10. The Silver Brazilians: "Kate Winslet"

In addition to selecting a "Coolest Song in the World This Week" and voting for "Coolest Song in the World This Year", at the end of 2009, Little Steven also posted his "25 Coolest Albums of the Decade" and "50 Coolest Songs This Decade". The top 10 Coolest Albums of the decade were:

1. The Beatles: The Beatles in Mono
2. Nuggets II: Original Artyfacts from the British Empire and Beyond, 1964–1969
3. Bruce Springsteen: Magic
4. The Chesterfield Kings: Psychedelic Sunrise
5. Primal Scream: Riot City Blues
6. Tinted Windows: Tinted Windows
7. Foxboro Hot Tubs: Stop, Drop and Roll
8. Cocktail Slippers: St. Valentine's Day Massacre
9. Iggy Pop: Skull Ring
10. Ray Davies: Other Peoples' Lives

The Top 10 "Coolest Songs of the Decade" were:

1. Joey Ramone: "Maria Bartiromo"
2. Bruce Springsteen & The E Street Band: "My Lucky Day"
3. Oasis: "Lyla"
4. Mick Jagger and John Lennon: "Too Many Cooks Spoil the Soup"
5. Foxboro Hot Tubs: "Stop Drop and Roll"
6. Locksley: "There's a Love"
7. Cocktail Slippers: "Don't Ever Leave Me"
8. Cheap Trick: "If It Takes a Lifetime'
9. Primal Scream: "Dolls"
10. Tinted Windows: "Nothing to Me"

== Listening to the Underground Garage ==
The weekly syndicated radio show

- On FM radio stations in USA – Station details (under "Radio Affiliates")
- On select radio stations in Europe/Asia Station details (under "Radio Affiliates")
- Worldwide via Voice of America Radio
- Norwegian radio channel P13

The 24/7 radio channel

- On satellite radio in North America: Sirius XM Satellite Radio channel 21
- On satellite TV in North America: DISH Network Channel 6025
- On the internet in North America: SiriusXM Radio

== Core artists ==
- The Stooges
- The White Stripes
- The Beatles
- The Who
- The Ramones
- The Rolling Stones
- Bo Diddley
- The Hives
- The Yardbirds
- The Byrds
- The Sex Pistols

== See also ==
- List of Sirius Satellite Radio stations
- List of XM Satellite Radio stations
