= Happy Valentine's Day (disambiguation) =

Happy Valentine's Day can refer to:

== Music ==
- "Happy Valentine's Day" a song by OutKast from the 2003 album Speakerboxxx/The Love Below
- "Happy Valentine's Day" a song played by Billy Boy On Poison
- "Happy Valentine's Day", a song by Psyopus from the 2007 album Our Puzzling Encounters Considered
- Happy Valentine's Day, a 2006 album by Phil Keaggy

== Films ==
- Happy Valentine's Day (film), a 2006 film that won a 28th Young Artist Award
- Happy Valentine's Day, a 2017 web series by Taiwanese actor Jay Shih

== See also ==
- Valentine's Day (disambiguation)
