= TeachRock =

Education initiative founded by Steven Van Zandt

TeachRock is an education initiative created by the Rock and Roll Forever Foundation, a nonprofit organization founded by musician, actor and activist Steven Van Zandt. The initiative is based in New York City and aims to provide free standards-aligned, arts-integration curriculum and professional development workshops to K-12 schools nationwide.

== History ==
TeachRock was founded in 2002 when Van Zandt began conversing with representatives from the National Association for Music Education, who claimed that by tying funding to testing that did not include arts, the No Child Left Behind Act had been devastating to art classes. Eventually, Van Zandt began recruiting a team of ethnomusicologists, educators and celebrity supporters to contribute to the organization. The Rock and Roll Forever Foundation's founder board includes Bruce Springsteen, Bono, Jackson Browne, and Martin Scorsese.

In December 2020, TeachRock held its second annual gala to support its mission as well as honor educators across the country who spent the year adjusting to virtual learning amid the COVID-19 pandemic. The virtual event included performances by Bruce Springsteen, Jackson Browne, Eddie Vedder, Margo Price and others.

In April 2021, Connecticut governor Ned Lamont announced that the state's education system would begin a partnership with TeachRock.

== Content and reach ==
As of March 2021, TeachRock had 193 teacher-facing lesson plans and 69 student-facing lesson plans. As an interdisciplinary curriculum provider, TeachRock's lessons cover a wide variety of subjects and topics to engage students including art, civics, math and geography. The lessons are taught using several music genres, ranging from classical to reggae.

According to TeachRock's annual report, the initiative reaches approximately 800,000 students per year and hosts over 45,000 online users. Additionally, TeachRock has partnered with several organizations to expand its reach, including the American Federation of Teachers, the National Education Association, the United Federation of Teachers, the Rock and Roll Hall of Fame, the California Department of Education, and the Grammy Museum.

The TeachRock Partner District and Schools Program supports school and district-wide adoption of the TeachRock curriculum through a rollout that features professional development and the sharing of arts-integration best practices. Current TeachRock partner districts and schools sites are as follows:

- 41 after school sites in New York City, in partnership with New York Edge
- Hopatcong Borough Schools, Hopatcong, NJ
- Milwaukee Public Schools, Milwaukee, WI
- Orangethrope Elementary, Fullerton, CA
- 36 after schools sites in Los Angeles, in partnership with ThinkTogether
- 3 partner sites in New Mexico, in partnership with TrueKids

== Associated events ==
In 2018, Steven Van Zandt and the Disciples of Soul announced a national tour in support of the TeachRock initiative. The tour included 28 shows which teachers were able to attend for free and also attend a pre-show TeachRock professional development workshop.

== See also ==
- Bruce Springsteen Center for American Music at Monmouth University
