= Unrequited Infatuations =

2021 memoir by Steven Van Zandt

- First edition
- Editor: Ben Greenman
- Author: Steven Van Zandt
- Language: English
- Genre: Memoir
- Publisher: Hachette Books
- Publication date: 2021

Unrequited Infatuations is a memoir written by Steven Van Zandt, edited by Ben Greenman, and published in 2021 by Hachette Books.
