= Valentine's Day (disambiguation) =

Valentine's Day is a holiday celebrated on February 14.

Valentine's Day may also refer to:

== Film and television ==
- Valentine's Day (2008 film), an Australian television comedy film
- Valentine's Day (2010 film), an American romantic comedy by Garry Marshall
- Valentine's Day (TV series), a 1964 American sitcom

=== Television episodes ===
- "Valentine's Day" (13 Reasons Why), 2020
- "Valentine's Day" (The Middle), 2010
- "Valentine's Day" (New Girl), 2012
- "Valentine's Day" (The Office), 2006
- "Valentine's Day" (Roseanne), 1991
- "Valentine's Day" (SpongeBob SquarePants), 2000
- "Valentine's Day" (Superstore), 2017

== Music ==
- Valentine's Day (soundtrack), a soundtrack album from the 2010 film
- Valentine's Day (John Zorn album), 2014
- "Valentine's Day" (song), by David Bowie, 2013
- "Valentine's Day", a song by ABC from The Lexicon of Love, 1982
- "Valentine's Day", a song by Betty Boo from Boomania, 1990
- "Valentine's Day", a song by Blood, Sweat & Tears from Blood, Sweat & Tears 4, 1971
- "Valentine's Day", a song by Bruce Springsteen from Tunnel of Love, 1987
- "Valentine's Day", a song by James Taylor from Never Die Young, 1988
- "Valentine's Day", a song by Klaus Nomi from Za Bakdaz, 2007
- "Valentine's Day", a song by LANY from Malibu Nights, 2018
- "Valentine's Day", a song by Linkin Park from Minutes to Midnight, 2007
- "Valentine's Day", a song by Marilyn Manson from Holy Wood (In the Shadow of the Valley of Death), 2000
- "Valentine's Day", a song by MisterWives from Superbloom, 2020
- "Valentine's Day", a song by Solange from Sol-Angel and the Hadley St. Dreams, 2008
- "Valentine's Day", a song by Steve Earle from I Feel Alright, 1996

== See also ==
- "Valentine Day", a song by Paul McCartney from McCartney, 1970
- Valentine Days, a Bollywood film of 2003
- "Valentine Days", a 2008 OVA episode of School Days
- Happy Valentine's Day (disambiguation)
- Saint Valentine's Day massacre (disambiguation)
  - Saint Valentine's Day Massacre, a 1929 gangland murder in Chicago
