= Steven Van Zandt =

American musician and actor (born 1950)

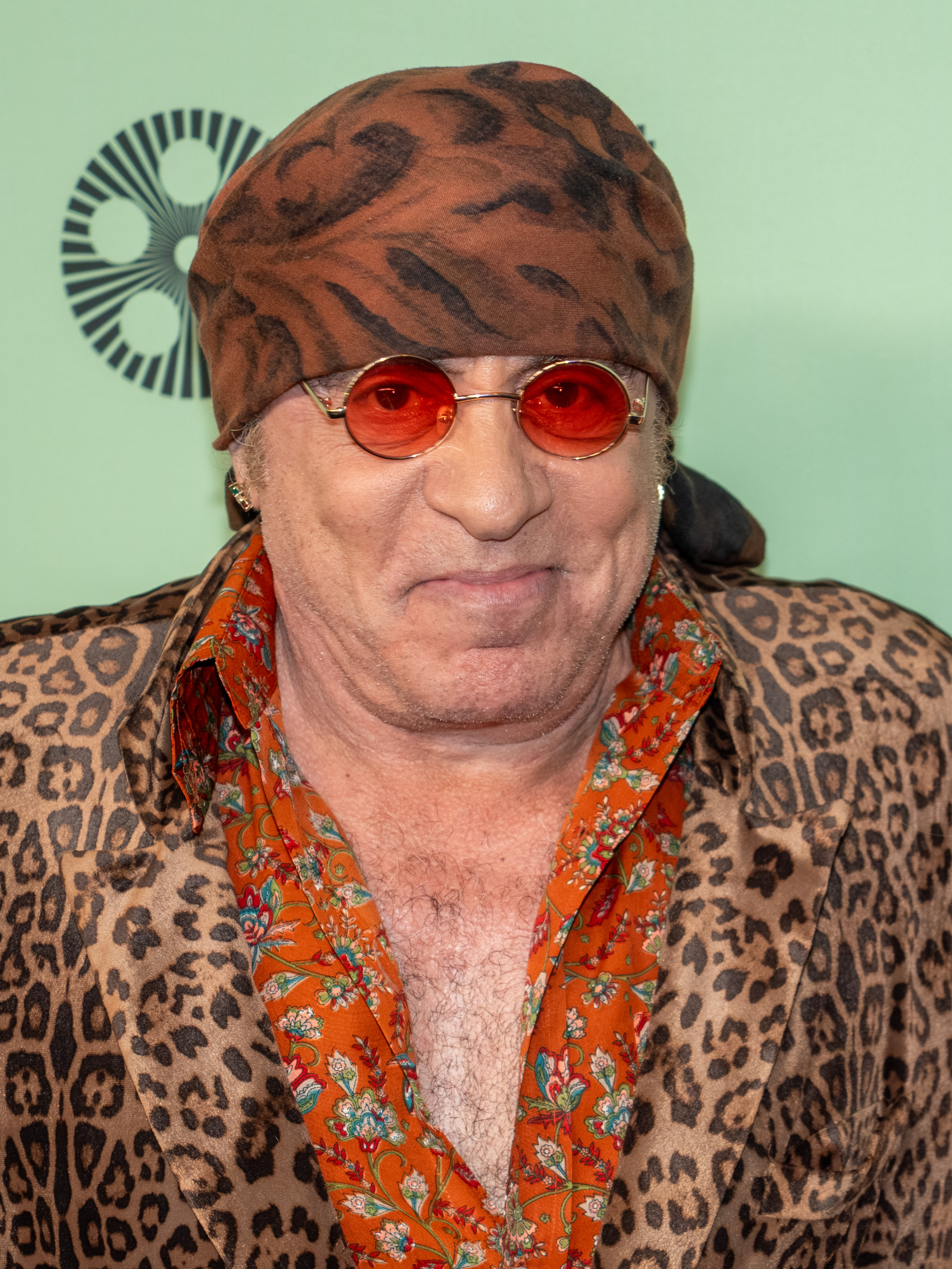
- Van Zandt in 2025

Background information
- Also known as: Little Steven; Miami Steve
- Born: Steven Lento; November 22, 1950 (age 76); Winthrop, Massachusetts, U.S.
- Origin: Middletown Township, New Jersey, U.S.
- Genres: Rock; heartland rock
- Occupations: Musician; singer; songwriter; producer; actor
- Instruments: Guitar; vocals
- Years active: 1968–present
- Labels: Columbia; Epic; EMI America; BMG; Manhattan; RCA; Rhino; Renegade Nation; Wicked Cool
- Member of: E Street Band
- Formerly of: Southside Johnny and the Asbury Jukes
- Spouse: Maureen Santoro (m. 1982)
- Awards: 2x SAG Award winner Grammy nominee (2025); Rutgers University Honorary Doctor of Fine Arts (2017)
- Website: littlesteven.com

Steven Van Zandt (né Lento; born November 22, 1950), also known as Little Steven or Miami Steve, is an American musician and actor. He is a member of Bruce Springsteen's E Street Band, in which he plays guitar and mandolin. He has appeared in several television drama series, including as Silvio Dante in The Sopranos (1999–2007) and as Frank Tagliano/Giovanni "Johnny" Henriksen in Lilyhammer (2012–2014). Van Zandt has his own solo band called Little Steven and the Disciples of Soul, intermittently active since the 1980s.

In 2014, Van Zandt was inducted into the Rock and Roll Hall of Fame as a member of the E Street Band. He has produced music, written songs, and had his own songs covered by Springsteen, Jackson Browne, Gary U.S. Bonds, Meat Loaf, Darlene Love, Ronnie Spector, Nancy Sinatra, Pearl Jam, Southside Johnny, Artists United Against Apartheid, and the Iron City Houserockers, among others.

== Early life ==
Van Zandt was born Steven Lento on November 22, 1950, in Winthrop, Massachusetts, to Mary Henrietta Lento and Vince Borello, and raised in Watertown, Massachusetts. He has Italian ancestry; one grandfather was from Calabria and one grandmother's parents were from Naples. His mother remarried in 1957, and he took the last name of his stepfather, William Brewster Van Zandt. Actor Billy Van Zandt is Van Zandt's half-brother and actress Adrienne Barbeau is his ex-sister-in-law. He also has a half-sister named Kathi, who is a writer. When he was seven, the family moved from Massachusetts to Middletown Township, New Jersey.

Van Zandt found his love for music at an early age, when he learned how to play the guitar. He watched the performances of the Beatles on The Ed Sullivan Show and the Rolling Stones on Hollywood Palace in 1964, and referred to the former as "The Big Bang of Rock n' Roll". He said that when he was 13, George Harrison was his favorite Beatle, and he later became friends with Paul McCartney and Ringo Starr.

Around August 1964, Van Zandt formed his first band, the Whirlwinds, which was short-lived. He later formed the Mates in 1965 and joined the Shadows in May 1966. He has cited British Invasion bands such as the Dave Clark Five, as well as Ravi Shankar and the culture of India, as early influences.

Van Zandt attended Middletown High School in Middletown Township, New Jersey, where he was expelled after refusing to cut his long hair. He later returned to school in 1968, largely to appease his mother. As a teenager, he was involved in a car accident that caused his head to go through the windshield, leaving several scars. To cover this up, he began wearing hats, and later, large bandanas, which has become his characteristic look.

== Career ==
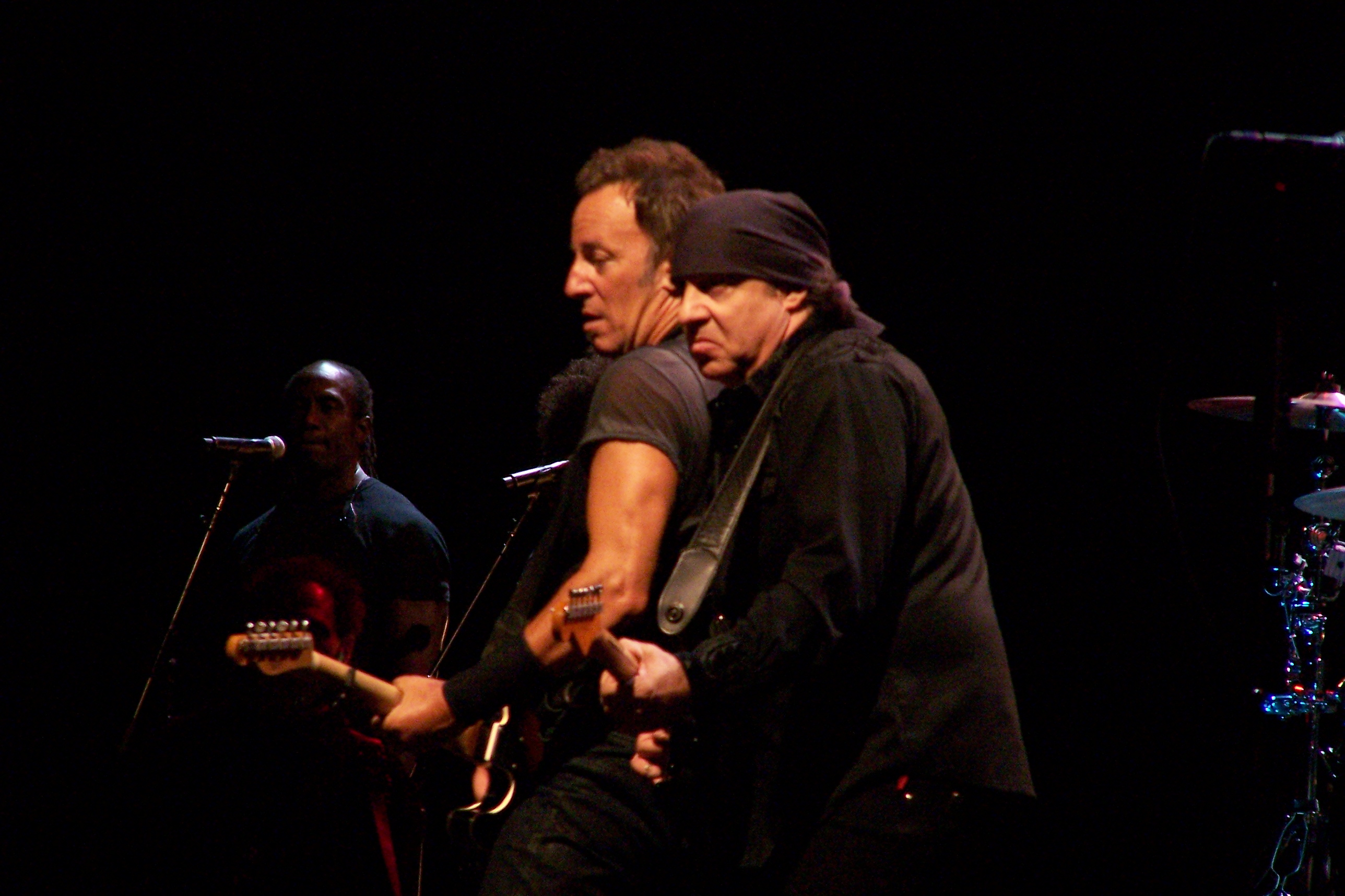
Van Zandt and Bruce Springsteen during the Working on a Dream Tour in Valladolid, Spain, in August 2009

Van Zandt grew up in the Jersey Shore music scene, and was an early friend of Bruce Springsteen, before the formation of the E Street Band. The two first met when Springsteen was at the Hullabaloo club in Middletown, New Jersey, and heard Van Zandt performing "Happy Together" with the Shadows. They performed together in bands such as Steel Mill and the Bruce Springsteen Band.

During the early 1970s, Van Zandt worked in road construction for two years before returning to show business.

In 1973, Van Zandt toured with the Dovells. The tour ended in Miami on December 31, 1974, with Dick Clark's Good Old Rock 'n' Roll Show at the Deauville Star Theater.

After returning to New Jersey, Van Zandt continued wearing Hawaiian shirts because he did not particularly like winter, which was how he got the nickname "Miami Steve".

=== Southside Johnny and the Asbury Jukes ===
Van Zandt co-founded Southside Johnny and the Asbury Jukes, in addition to the Miami Horns, who got their name from Van Zandt's nickname. He helped establish the rhythm and blues oriented style of music that the band performed. He also produced Southside Johnny's first three albums. Van Zandt wrote the bulk of the group's music, contributing substantially to its success.

=== E Street Band ===
Van Zandt then started to switch between writing for Southside Johnny and the Asbury Jukes and touring with the E Street Band. He confirmed in an interview on The Howard Stern Show that he arranged the horns on "Tenth Avenue Freeze-Out" in 1975 when Springsteen was at a loss, earning him a spot in the E Street Band shortly thereafter. In the Wings For Wheels documentary, Springsteen revealed that Van Zandt was partially responsible for the signature guitar line in "Born to Run," described as "Arguably Steve's greatest contribution to my music." Ultimately, Van Zandt officially joined the E Street Band on July 20, 1975, during the first show of the Born to Run Tour.

In those early years, Van Zandt supplied a great deal of the lead guitar work for the band in concert, as can be seen on the 1975 concert DVD within Born to Run 30th Anniversary Edition (later released as the CD Hammersmith Odeon London '75). In 1983, shortly before the start of the Born in the U.S.A. Tour, Van Zandt left the E Street Band to further his solo career. Despite leaving the band, he appeared as a special guest at several concerts in 1984 and 1985, and appeared in the music video for "Glory Days".

Van Zandt later returned to the E Street Band since 1999. By this time, his guitar playing had mostly been reduced to a background rhythm role, due to Nils Lofgren's position in the band and his capability as a lead guitarist. In addition, Springsteen had begun taking many more guitar solos as his music became more guitar-centered. Van Zandt said on the Howard Stern Show that he is okay with being second in command, especially since he has been in charge before with his solo music and his role in Lilyhammer.

Among E Street Band members, Van Zandt often had the second-most "face time" in concert after Clarence Clemons, frequently mugging and posing for the audience and sometimes delivering his unpolished, nasal backing vocals while sharing a microphone with Springsteen. His playing or singing is most prominently featured on the songs "Glory Days", "Two Hearts", "Long Walk Home", which featured a Van Zandt outro vocal solo during live performances "Land of Hope and Dreams", "Badlands", "Ramrod", and "Murder Incorporated", among others like the live versions of "Rosalita". He often trades vocals with Springsteen in live versions of "Prove It All Night". He features prominently in the video for "Glory Days", sharing the spotlight with Springsteen and Nils Lofgren during the choruses, while swapping lines with them during the (non)fade, and in live versions he does the same.

=== Songwriter, arranger, producer ===
Van Zandt became a songwriter and producer for fellow Jersey shore act Southside Johnny and the Asbury Jukes in 1974, penning their signature song "I Don't Want to Go Home", co-writing other songs for them with Springsteen, and producing their most-acclaimed record, Hearts of Stone. As such, Van Zandt became a key contributor to the Jersey Shore sound. He also produced two Gary U.S. Bonds albums. Van Zandt then went on to share production credits on the classic Springsteen albums The River and Born in the U.S.A. The first Springsteen song he co-produced was "Hungry Heart." In 1989, Jackson Browne covered the 1983 Van Zandt composition "I Am A Patriot" on his World in Motion album. Van Zandt has produced a number of other records, including an uncredited effort on the Iron City Houserockers' Have A Good Time (But Get Out Alive). Less successful was his work on Lone Justice's second album Shelter, which was a career-ending flop for the Los Angeles cowpunk band.

In 1989, Van Zandt wrote "While You Were Looking at Me" for Michael Monroe's album Not Fakin' It and co-wrote video hits "Dead, Jail or Rock'n Roll" and "Smoke Screen". He was an arranger and backing vocalist for a few songs on the album. In 1992, he produced Austin, Texas-based Arc Angels' debut album. In 1991 Van Zandt produced a successful album, Spirit of Love, for Nigerian superstar and reggae icon, Majek Fashek. In 1992, he wrote and produced "All Alone on Christmas" for the soundtrack of the Chris Columbus film Home Alone 2: Lost in New York, which yielded singer Darlene Love her first hit since "A Fine, Fine Boy" from 1963, thirty-one years earlier.

In 1994, Van Zandt produced the eponymous debut album of the punk rock band Demolition 23 which featured ex-Hanoi Rocks members Michael Monroe and Sami Yaffa. He co-wrote six songs for the album with Monroe and Jude Wilder. In 1995, Van Zandt aided Meat Loaf with the song "Amnesty Is Granted" off of his Welcome to the Neighborhood album. In 2004, he contributed the song "Baby Please Don't Go" to Nancy Sinatra's self-titled album.

=== Solo artist ===
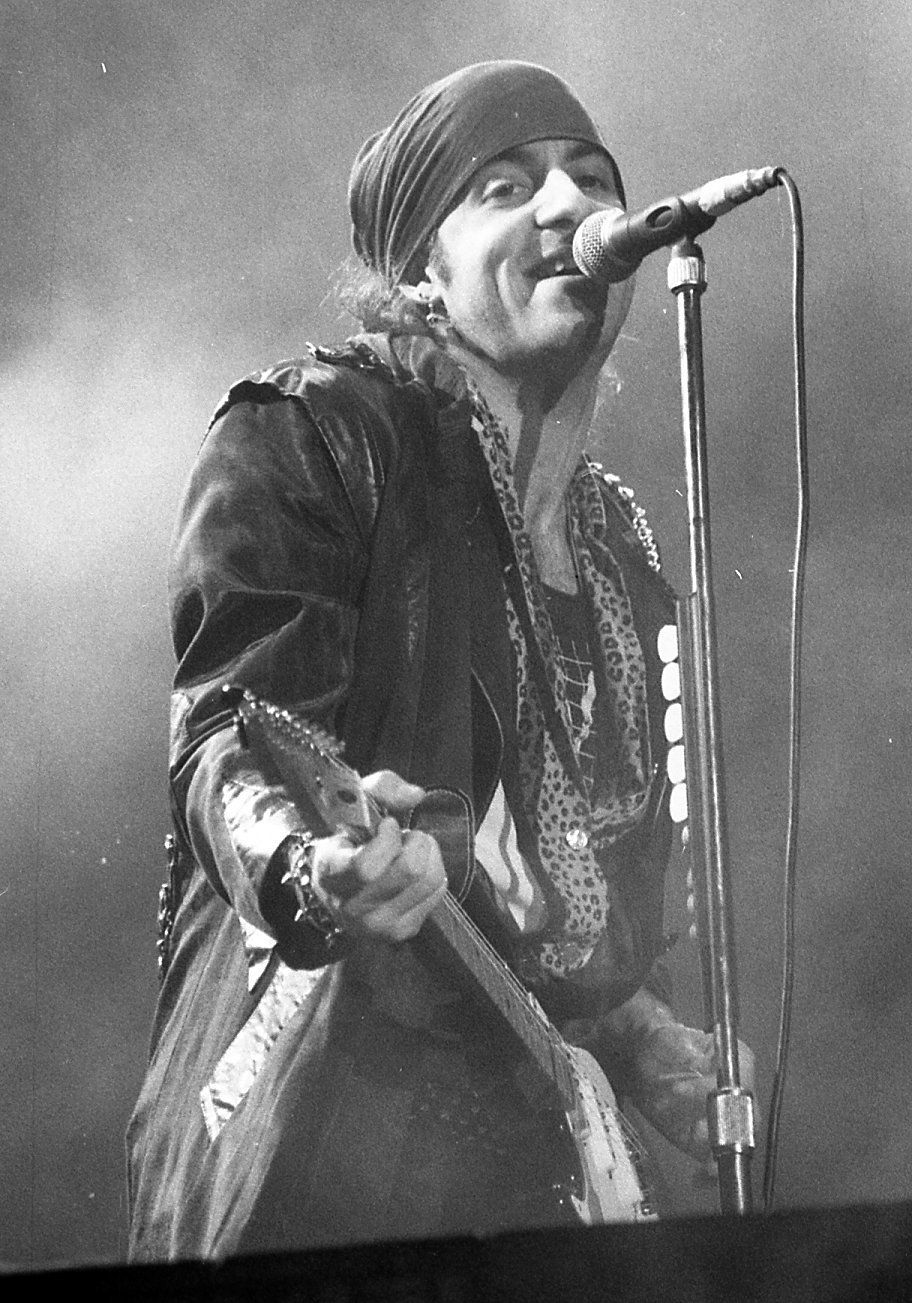
Van Zandt performing at the Reading Festival in 1983

During the summer of 1981, EMI-America approached Van Zandt with a record deal due to his success with the E Street Band, Southside Johnny and the Asbury Jukes, and Gary U.S. Bonds. He began fronting an on-and-off group known as Little Steven and the Disciples of Soul, while Springsteen was working on Nebraska. The band included Dino Danelli on drums, Jean Beauvoir on bass, and the Miami Horns. They made their live debut at the Peppermint Lounge on July 18, 1982. In October 1982, Van Zandt's debut album, Men Without Women, was released. This album earned the most critical praise and Jay Cocks of TIME magazine dubbed it one of the ten best albums of the year. He released four more solo albums, and has written that these albums are each elements in a five-part political concept cycle: the individual, the family, the state, the economy, and religion. These albums range from soul music to hard rock to world music. Van Zandt's second album, Voice of America, did the best on the U.S. albums chart, although none of his albums were much of a commercial success.

After touring with the E Street Band during The River Tour in 1980–81, Van Zandt realized and understood the perceptions of Americans held by people in other countries. He became interested in politics and, with Voice of America, his music became explicitly political. One of the album's leading singles, "Solidarity", is a general statement of international common ground. In April 1984, shortly before the release of Born in the U.S.A. and Voice of America, Van Zandt left the E Street Band, but rejoined in 1999.

In 1987, Van Zandt released the album Freedom - No Compromise, which continued the political messaging. Some U.S. appearances in that year as opening act for U2's arena-and-stadium Joshua Tree Tour continued in the same vein, but were not well received by some audiences. Both the record and his concerts were popular in Europe. He also performed at the Nelson Mandela 70th Birthday Tribute concert at Wembley Stadium in 1988.

Van Zandt's fourth album, Revolution (1989), attracted little attention. Later in 1989, he recorded another album, Nobody Loves and Leaves Alive with his garage band The Lost Boys. Although the album remains unreleased, several tracks from it were heard on the Sopranos and Lilyhammer television shows: including "Nobody Loves and Leaves Alive", "Affection", and "Come for Me". "Affection" appeared on The Sopranos: Peppers & Eggs (Music From the HBO Original Series).

Due to a loss of recording contract, Van Zandt's next album, Born Again Savage, which was recorded in 1994, was not released until 1999. In 1995, he wrote, produced, and sang "The Time of Your Life" for the soundtrack to the film Nine Months. He also toured with Bon Jovi during the first European leg of their These Days Tour.

Van Zandt's song "Under The Gun" was covered by Carla Olson & The Textones on their Detroit '85 Live & Unreleased album which was released in 2008. Another of his songs, "All I Needed Was You", appeared on the 2013 Carla Olson album Have Harmony, Will Travel.

On April 29, 2013, Van Zandt performed a cover of Frank Sinatra's "My Kind of Town" at a Springsteen concert in Oslo, Norway, during the Wrecking Ball Tour. Although the song was featured in the Lilyhammer season one episode "My Kind of Town," it was not released as a single until September 23, 2014, when it was "the Coolest Song in the World" on Underground Garage to help promote the show. It was released under the title "Frank Tagliano Sings! My Kind of Town" and the lyrics were changed to be about Lillehammer, Norway, instead of Chicago. Van Zandt performed the song on The Tonight Show Starring Jimmy Fallon on December 9, 2014, to help promote the series. He performed all the music for Lilyhammer from season 2 on and released Lilyhammer: The Score on December 16, 2014.

Van Zandt reformed his band, the Disciples of Soul, for the first time since 1990 to play their only European show of 2016 at the O2 Indigo Lounge in London for BluesFest on October 29, 2016. The new Disciples included Richie Sambora and Marc Ribler on guitar, Eddie Manion on saxophone, Hook Herrara on harmonica, Leo Green on tenor sax, Richard Mecurio on drums, Jack Daley on bass, Andy Burton on B3 organ, Clifford Carter on piano, Danny Sadownick on percussion, Tommy Walsh and Matt Holland on trumpet, Neil Sidwell on trombone, George Millard on flute, and a women's section called the Divas of Soul (Julie Maguire, Sarah Carpenter and Jess Greenfield) on backing vocals. They played a series of Van Zandt's own solo songs, songs he wrote for Southside Johnny and the Asbury Jukes, a song he co-wrote for the Breakers, cover songs, and "Goodbye", which he performed with the Lost Boys. His plans included a European tour during the summer of 2017 and a tour of the United States in the fall. Van Zandt insists that he is not leaving the E Street Band and he is only touring because the band is not on the road.

Van Zandt announced in November 2016 that he was in the process of remastering and reissuing his albums for a 2017 release, including the unreleased Lost Boys album. Additionally, Van Zandt has stated that he was planning on releasing a new cover album, including a cover of Etta James' "The Blues Is My Business", as well as new recordings of songs Van Zandt wrote for others, including Southside Johnny, that he describes as "me covering me." The album is a soul record, composed of a 15-piece band including 5 horns and 3 singers. Van Zandt revealed that Richie Mercurio plays drums on the album.

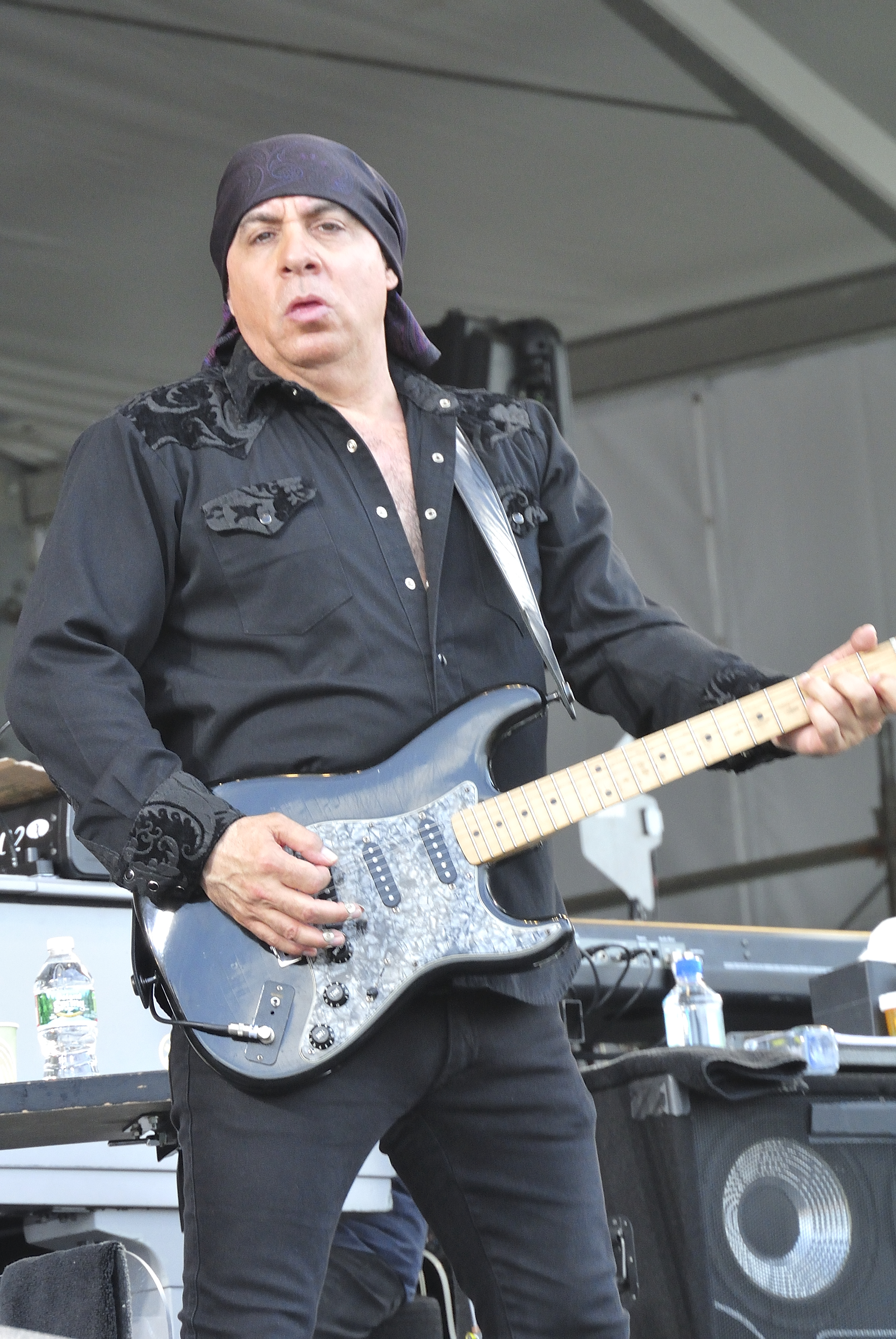
Van Zandt onstage during the New Orleans Jazz & Heritage Festival in 2012

On February 9, 2017, Van Zandt released "Saint Valentine's Day," a cover of the song, "Saint Valentine's Day Massacre," that he originally wrote for the Cocktail Slippers, as a single. The song was repeatedly played on the Underground Garage radio show.

Van Zandt debuted his new album at the annual Rock and Roll for Children event at the Fillmore Theater in Silver Spring, Maryland, on March 18, 2017. He debuted a doo-wop song called "The City Weeps Tonight," that was an outtake from Men Without Women. At the end of the show, he covered "Bye Bye Johnny" as a tribute to the late Chuck Berry. According to Backstreets, Van Zandt's new album was going to be called Soulfire, titled after the song he co-wrote for the Breakers. The album was officially released on May 19, 2017. Van Zandt was selected as the commencement speaker and received an honorary degree from Rutgers University in May 2017.

Van Zandt released his first official live album, Soulfire Live!, recorded with the Disciples of Soul during their 2017 tour of the same name, on April 27, 2018, via iTunes. A 7 LP vinyl box set, CD, and two-disc Blu-ray video were released on February 15, 2019, via Wicked Cool Records/UMe. Consisting of the best performances from their North American and European concerts, the collection feature Little Steven and his 15-strong band taking you on a musical history lesson as they blast through an arsenal of songs spanning rock, pop, soul, blues, funk, doo-wop, reggae and everything in between. Of note, is a performance of "I Saw Her Standing There" recorded at The Roundhouse in London with a special appearance by Paul McCartney.

Little Steven and the Disciples of Soul recorded a cover of Elvis Presley's "Santa Claus Is Back in Town", featuring actor Kurt Russell on lead vocals, for the 2018 film The Christmas Chronicles.

On March 8, 2019, Van Zandt announced the May 3, 2019, CD, digital and vinyl release of Summer of Sorcery via Wicked Cool/UME. It was written, arranged, and produced by him at his Renegade Studios in New York City and marks his first new album of original material in 20 years. A tour for the album began in May 2019, but was cancelled in September 2019 due to illness.

Van Zandt finally reissued his albums in the 7 LP and 4-CD box set, Rock N Roll Rebel: The Early Work, released on December 6, 2019. Limited to 1,000 copies, it includes the first United States pressing of 1989's Revolution, as well as the first vinyl release of Born Again Savage, originally released in 1999. The box set also includes rare outtakes and live performances. The Lost Boys album, however, remains unreleased. Van Zandt stated that the album contains his favorite songs that he recorded and wants to wait until the album can be "properly promoted."

=== Actor ===
Until 1997, Van Zandt had no professional acting experience. His main focus had been music, whether it was the multiple bands he participated in, groups he composed pieces for, or music he wrote on his own. Then, he was asked to play a part in The Sopranos. After, acting became part of Van Zandt's career.

==== The Sopranos ====
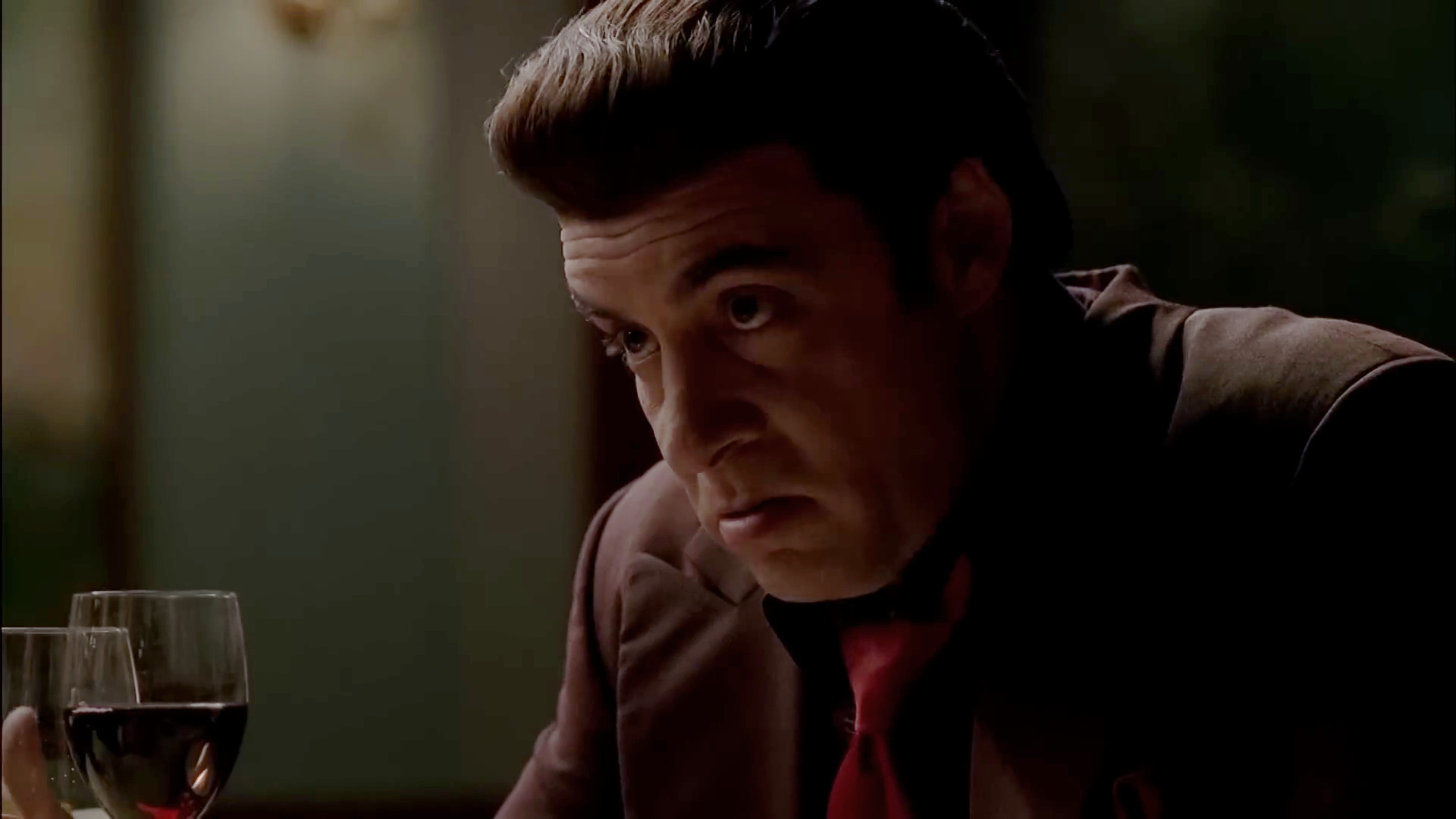
Van Zandt as Silvio Dante in The Sopranos

In 1999, Van Zandt took one of the lead roles in The Sopranos, playing level-headed but deadly mob consigliere and strip club owner Silvio Dante. The casting choice was made by series creator David Chase, who invited Van Zandt to audition after seeing him induct the Rascals at the 1997 Rock and Roll Hall of Fame and being impressed with his humorous appearance and presence. Though Van Zandt had never acted before, he auditioned for the role of Tony Soprano. HBO felt that the role should go to an experienced actor, however, so Chase wrote a part especially for Van Zandt. Van Zandt eventually agreed to star on the show as Silvio Dante, and his real-life spouse Maureen (née Santoro) was cast as his on-screen wife Gabriella. Van Zandt later said "Casting me was a ballsy move. David handed me a gift by making me an actor. It changed my career."

==== Tussles in Brussels ====
Van Zandt recorded the narration for the Hives's biography on their concert DVD Tussles in Brussels (2004).

==== Hotel Cæsar ====
In 2010, Van Zandt appeared as himself in the Norwegian soap opera Hotel Cæsar, broadcast on Norway's biggest commercial channel TV2 Norway.

==== Lilyhammer ====
In 2011, Van Zandt starred in, co-wrote, and was the executive producer for an English and Norwegian language series titled Lilyhammer, the first original Netflix series that was produced in collaboration with Norwegian broadcaster NRK. The name recalls the city of Lillehammer, which hosted the 1994 Winter Olympics. On the show, Van Zandt portrays a Sopranos-like role of an ex-mafioso who enters the witness protection program and flees to Norway to escape a colleague against whom he testified. The show premiered on NRK television on January 25, 2012, with an audience of 998,000 viewers (one fifth of Norway's population), and ran for three seasons before being cancelled in 2015.

==== The Irishman ====
Van Zandt appears in the Martin Scorsese-produced gangster epic The Irishman as singer Jerry Vale, lip-syncing Vale's Al Di La.

=== Radio host and entrepreneur ===
==== Radio host ====
Since 2002, Van Zandt has hosted Little Steven's Underground Garage, a weekly syndicated radio show that celebrates garage rock and similar rock subgenres from the 1950s to the present day. As of December 2006, the show is heard on over 200 US radio stations and in some international markets. For example, in Spain it has beamed through Rock & Gol since 2007 and later on Rock FM Radio in Finland; Radio Helsinki started beaming Little Steven's Underground Garage in August 2008.

On October 20, 2011, the program recorded its 500th show in front of a sold-out crowd at the Hard Rock Cafe in New York's Times Square. The guests included the band Green Day; Steve Buscemi, star of The Sopranos and Boardwalk Empire; Vincent Pastore, aka "Big Pussy Bonpensiero" from The Sopranos; actor and director Tim Robbins; and singer Debbie Harry.

==== Program director ====
Van Zandt is also the program director for two radio channels for the Sirius Satellite Radio network. The channels continuously broadcast on satellite radio in the US, and worldwide on Sirius Internet Radio. One channel, named Underground Garage, has the same philosophy and musical mandate as his own radio show. On-air hosts on the channel include original Rolling Stones manager/producer Andrew Loog Oldham, singer/guitarist Joan Jett, former record executive Kid Leo, punk rock singer Handsome Dick Manitoba and rock entrepreneur Kim Fowley. The second channel, named the Outlaw Country, presents the edgier side of country music, both roots and contemporary. On-air hosts for this channel included the late pop-culture satirist Mojo Nixon.

==== Record label ====
In December 2004, Van Zandt launched his own record label, Wicked Cool Records.

The first album released by Wicked Cool was Fuzz for the Holidays by Davie Allan and the Arrows, released on December 14, 2004. The first set of records released by Wicked Cool also included new albums from Underground Garage favorites the Charms, the Chesterfield Kings and the Cocktail Slippers; and CBGB Forever, a tribute to the famous, now-defunct venue. The label continues to release new albums from the next generation of garage rockers including the Cocktail Slippers as well as volumes of Little Steven's Underground Garage presents The Coolest Songs in the World, a compilation of selected songs from the Underground Garage radio show's popular feature, the "Coolest Song in the World This Week". In 2007, the label signed The Launderettes. The label's first Halloween and Christmas themed compilations were released in 2008. Lost Cathedral is a subsidiary label of Wicked Cool Records and home to the band Crown of Thorns.

=== Rock and Soul Forever Foundation ===
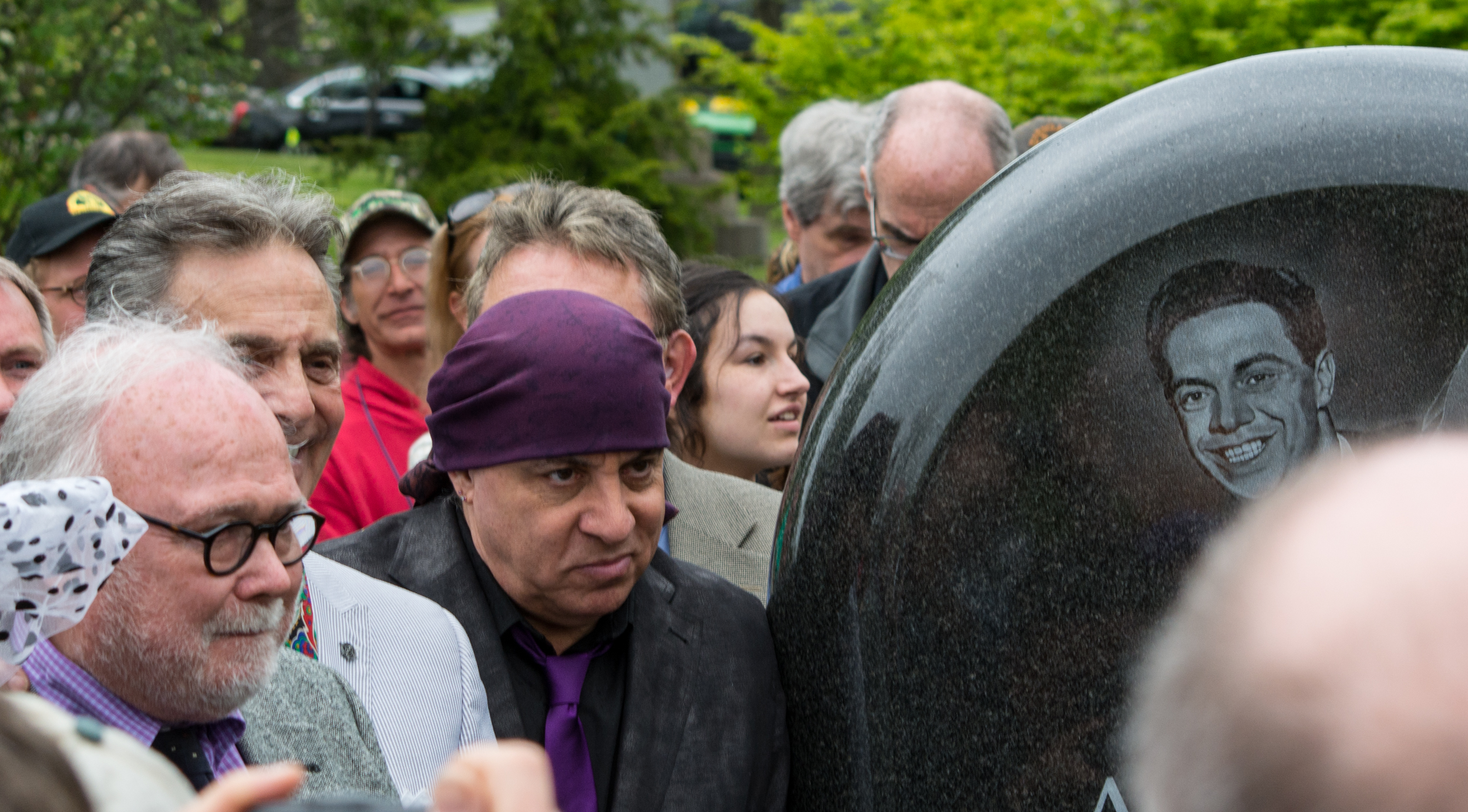
Van Zandt at the dedication of the Alan Freed memorial, celebrating the legacy of Alan Freed, at Lake View Cemetery in Cleveland Heights, Ohio, in May 2016

In 2007, Van Zandt launched the non-profit Rock and Soul Forever Foundation and its TeachRock project, which creates K-12 national curriculum. TeachRock includes interdisciplinary, arts-driven materials. The initiative features lesson plans covering topics in social studies, general music, language arts and media studies.

=== Musical director ===
In September 2006, Van Zandt assembled and directed an all-star band to back Hank Williams Jr. on a new version of "All My Rowdy Friends Are Coming Over Tonight" for the season premiere (and formal ESPN debut) of Monday Night Football. The all-star lineup included Little Richard, Rick Nielsen (Cheap Trick), Joe Perry (Aerosmith), Questlove (the Roots), Charlie Daniels, Bootsy Collins, Chris Burney (Bowling for Soup), and Bernie Worrell.

Since 2007, Van Zandt has been the director of a music selection committee for the video game Rock Band; he is in charge of selecting new music for the game.

=== Activist career ===
After leaving the E Street Band in 1984, Van Zandt used his celebrity as a musician to raise awareness of apartheid in South Africa. The following year, he created with record producer Arthur Baker the music-industry activist group Artists United Against Apartheid as an action against the Sun City resort in South Africa, which catered to wealthy white tourists. The resort upheld racist apartheid policies, yet many famous entertainers chose to perform there. Forty-nine recording artists including Springsteen, Peter Gabriel, Miles Davis, Bob Dylan, U2, Pete Townshend, Joey Ramone, Tom Petty, Afrika Bambaataa, Ringo Starr, and Run-DMC collaborated on a song called "Sun City", in which they pledged to never perform at the resort. The song was modestly successful, and played a part in the broad international effort to bring attention to apartheid, which the South African government later ended. He produced the award-winning documentary The Making of Sun City and oversaw the production of the book, Sun City by Artists United Against Apartheid, the Struggle for Freedom in South Africa: The Making of the Record, as well as the teaching guide.

The Sun City project was originally meant to only be one song, but other musicians contributed their own pieces which transformed it into a full-length album. Sun City was one of the first musical collaborations among major recording stars to support a political cause rather than a social cause. The album raised more than $1 million in support of anti-apartheid efforts. The primary goal of the album and foundation was to draw attention to South Africa's racist policy of apartheid and to support a cultural boycott of the country.

Van Zandt was a part of the 1989 charity single, "Spirit of the Forest", dedicated to saving the rainforests.

Later in his career, Van Zandt worked to raise awareness about the U.S. military interference in governments of Central America and other issues.

=== Author ===
Van Zandt's memoir Unrequited Infatuations was published September 28, 2021, by Hachette Books.

=== Tours with Bruce Springsteen & The E Street Band ===
- Born to Run tours, 1975–1977
- Darkness Tour, 1978–1979
- The River Tour, 1980–1981
- Reunion Tour, 1999–2000
- The Rising Tour, 2002–2003
- Vote for Change Tour, 2004
- Magic Tour, 2007–2008
- Working on a Dream Tour, 2009
- Wrecking Ball Tour, 2012–2013
- High Hopes Tour, 2014
- River Tour 2016/Oceania '17, 2016–2017
- Springsteen and E Street Band 2023 Tour, 2023
- Land of Hope and Dreams American Tour, 2026

== The Disciples of Soul Members ==
=== Current members ===
- Steven Van Zandt - lead vocals, guitar (1982–1989, 2016–present)
- Ed Manion - baritone saxophone, horn director (1982–1984, 2016–present)
- Stan Harrison - saxophone (1982–1984, 2016–present)
- Marc Ribler - guitar, backing vocals, musical director (2016–present)
- Andy Burton - keyboards, backing vocals (2016–present)
- Lowell "Banana" Levinger - keyboards, backing vocals (2016–present)
- Jack Daley - bass (2016–present)
- Rich Mercurio - drums (2016–present)
- Anthony Almonte - percussion, backing vocals (2016–present)
- Clark Gayton - trombone (2016–present)
- Ravi Best - trumpet (2016–present)
- Ron Tooley - trumpet (2016–present)
- Jessie Wagner - backing vocals (2016–present)
- Sara Devine - backing vocals (2016–present)
- Tania Jones - backing vocals (2016–present)

=== Former members ===
- Jean Beauvoir - bass, backing vocals (1982–1987)
- Dino Danelli - drums (1982–1987)
- Monti Louis Ellison - percussion (1982–1984)
- Mark Pender - trumpet (1982–1984)
- Richie "La Bamba" Rosenberg - trombone (1982–1984)

== Personal life ==
Van Zandt married actress Maureen Santoro in New York City on December 31, 1982. Later she portrayed his wife on The Sopranos. Bruce Springsteen was the best man at their wedding, Little Richard presided over it, and it featured Percy Sledge singing "When a Man Loves a Woman".

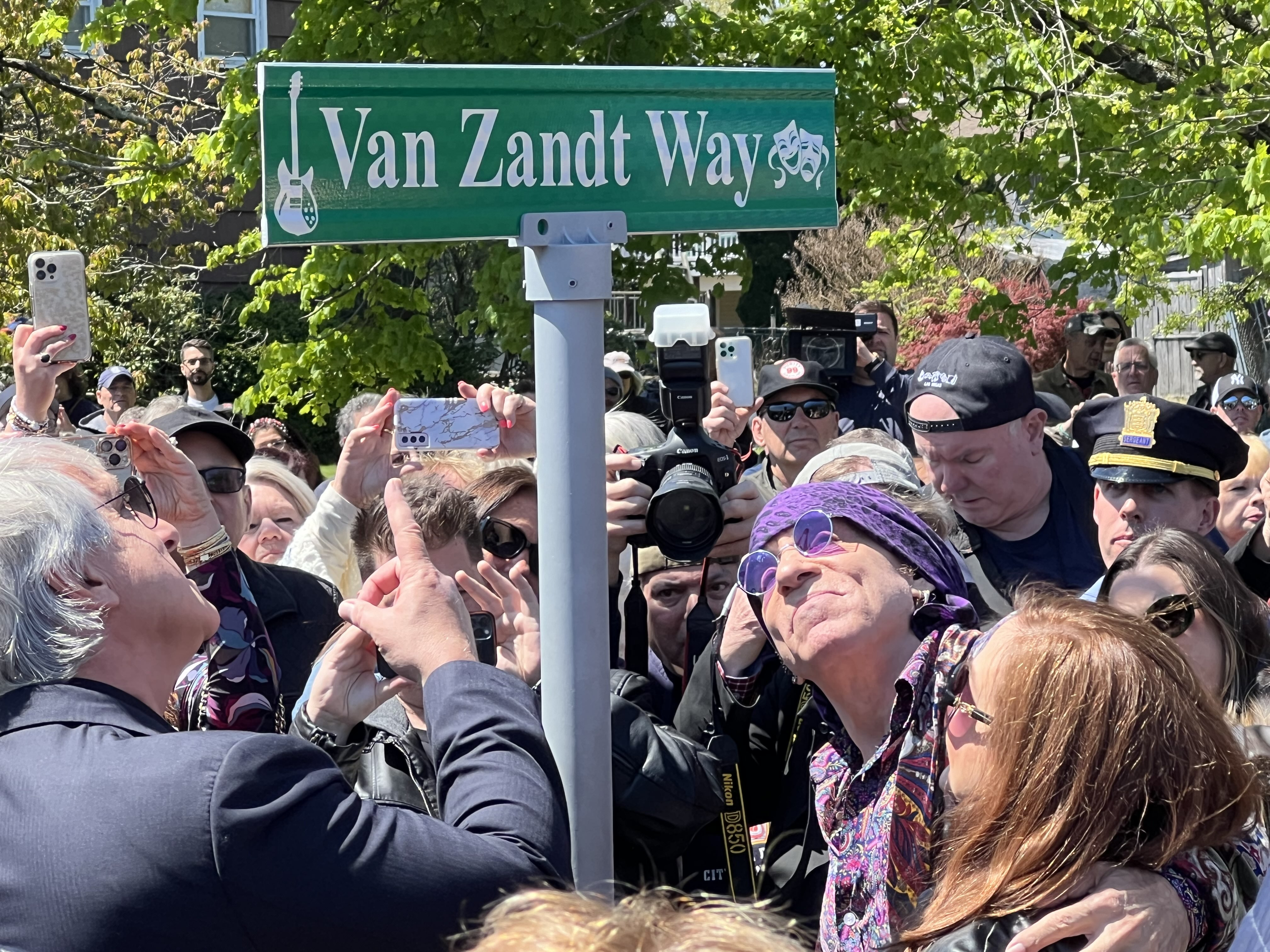
The Van Zandt Brothers admire the new sign in Middletown, NJ (2024)

On April 26, 2024, Van Zandt was honored by having the street his family lived on named after them, becoming "Van Zandt Way".

In June 2025, Van Zandt was forced to miss some shows on the Springsteen and E Street Band 2023–2025 Tour for what he assumed was food poisoning. He ended up needing emergency surgery in San Sebastián for what turned out to be appendicitis. The operation was a success.

== Philanthropy ==
Van Zandt is an honorary board member of Little Kids Rock. He was awarded the fourth annual "Big Man of the Year" award at the organization's 2013 Right to Rock Benefit Event.

Van Zandt and his wife Maureen also serve on the Count Basie Theatre's Board of Advisors, and were named as that organization's honorary capital campaign chairs in 2015.

Van Zandt, his wife Maureen, and Retired Detective Kevin Schroeder created a 501(C)(3) non-profit, Little Steven's Policeman's Ball; funds raised from the events go to The Detectives Endowment Association Widows and Children's Fund and NYPD With Arms Wide Open, a foundation that supports NYPD officers with children who have special needs.

== Discography ==
All albums are credited to "Little Steven".

- Men Without Women (1982)
- Voice of America (1984)
- Freedom – No Compromise (1987)
- Revolution (1989)
- Nobody Loves and Leaves Alive (1989 - unreleased)
- Born Again Savage (1999)
- Soulfire (2017)
- Summer of Sorcery (2019)

== Filmography ==
Year	Title	Role(s)	Notes	Ref.		
Year	Title	1985	Notes	Ref.	American Flyers	Cyclist
1999 - 2007	The Sopranos	Silvio Dante				
2012 - 2014	Lilyhammer	Frank Tagliano				
2016	American Dad!	Diner Owner				
2018	The Christmas Chronicles	Wolfie				
2019	The Irishman	Jerry Vale				
2023	Under the Boardwalk	Bruno				
2024	Stevie Van Zandt: Disciple	Himself	Documentary			
2024	The Trainer	Isaac Rabinowitz				
