= The Friggs =

Rock band from New Jersey

- Origin: Camden, NJ
- Genres: Garage rock, pop rock
- Years active: 1990–2000
- Labels: E-Vil Records, Sympathy for the Record Industry, Apex East, Telstar
- Members: Palmyra Delran, Jezebel
- Past members: Lexi Plum

The Friggs were a garage rock band from Camden, New Jersey active from 1990 to 2000. Its original members were Palmyra Delran (guitar) and Jezebel (singer/songwriter), the latter of whom was later replaced by Lexi Plumm.

== History ==
The band played its first show in Philadelphia on New Year's Eve 1991/1992, and released their first single, a cover of The Troggs' "Come Now," in 1991, before playing any live shows. This was followed by several more singles and an EP, America's Only Rock & Roll Magazine Parody. The cover of this 1994 EP, which was produced by Ben Vaughn, closely mimicked the cover of an old issue of Creem. Late that year, Jezebel left the band, whereupon she was replaced by Lexi Plumm. Delran decided to hire Plumm after she was impressed by the sound of motorcycles on her answering machine. The band released their only album, Rock Candy, in 1997 on E-Vil Records. It was also produced by Vaughn. Rock Candy received positive reviews, which led to the band opening for Beck and Cheap Trick. The band performed at SXSW in 1997 and broke up in 2000.

== Film appearances ==
The Friggs' song "Bad Word for a Good Thing" appeared in both the films Jawbreaker and Fuck. Their cover of Pat Benatar's song "Heartbreaker" also appeared in Jawbreaker, but was left off the soundtrack. Their song "Shake," from their second single release in 1991, appeared in the film Superbad. On the heels of this exposure, the band decided to reunite in 2008 for a few more performances.

== Style ==
The Friggs themselves have described their style as "trashy pop", and MTV News' Frank Tortorici concurred with this description. The Austin Chronicle has described the Friggs as "an all-female version of The Standells" and their music as "'60's-influenced trash-pop". Similarly, The Morning Call has praised the band for their "danceable retro-'60s sound."

== Discography ==
=== Singles ===
- "Bad Word For A Good Thing" / "Friggs Theme" Telstar Records TR 009 - 1993

=== Albums ===
- Rock Candy (1997) -E-Vil Records

=== EPs ===
- America's Only Rock & Roll Magazine Parody (1994) - Sympathy for the Record Industry

=== Compilations ===
- Today is Tomorrow’s Yesterday (2007) - Apex East
