= CBGB Forever =

Compilation album by Various artists
- Released: May 15, 2007
- Recorded: Various
- Genre: Punk rock, pop punk, alternative
- Length: 46:24
- Label: Wicked Cool Records
- Producer: Josh Abraham

CBGB Forever is a compilation album produced by Josh Abraham. It is named after the theater in New York, New York. It consists mainly of rare songs, hits, and covers. Artists include Green Day, Blondie, Foo Fighters, Ramones, U2, Talking Heads, Good Charlotte, Patti Smith Group, Rancid, The Damned, Audioslave, The Chesterfield Kings, Velvet Revolver, and The Dead Boys. It was released May 15, 2007 by Wicked Cool Records.

#	Title	Band	Time
1	Favorite Son	Green Day	2:12
2	Hanging on the Telephone	Blondie	2:20
3	Danny Says (Originally performed by Ramones)	Foo Fighters	2:58
4	My Brain is Hanging Upside Down (Bonzo Goes to Bitburg)	Ramones	3:55
5	Beat On the Brat (Originally performed by Ramones)	U2	2:35
6	Life During Wartime	Talking Heads	3:40
7	Mountain	Good Charlotte	4:31
8	Till Victory	Patti Smith Group	2:46
9	Time Bomb	Rancid	2:25
10	New Rose	The Damned	2:43
11	Cochise	Audioslave	3:42
12	I Don't Understand	The Chesterfield Kings	3:33
13	Do It for the Kids	Velvet Revolver	3:56
14	Sonic Reducer	The Dead Boys	3:08
