= Cocktail Slippers =

Norwegian rock band

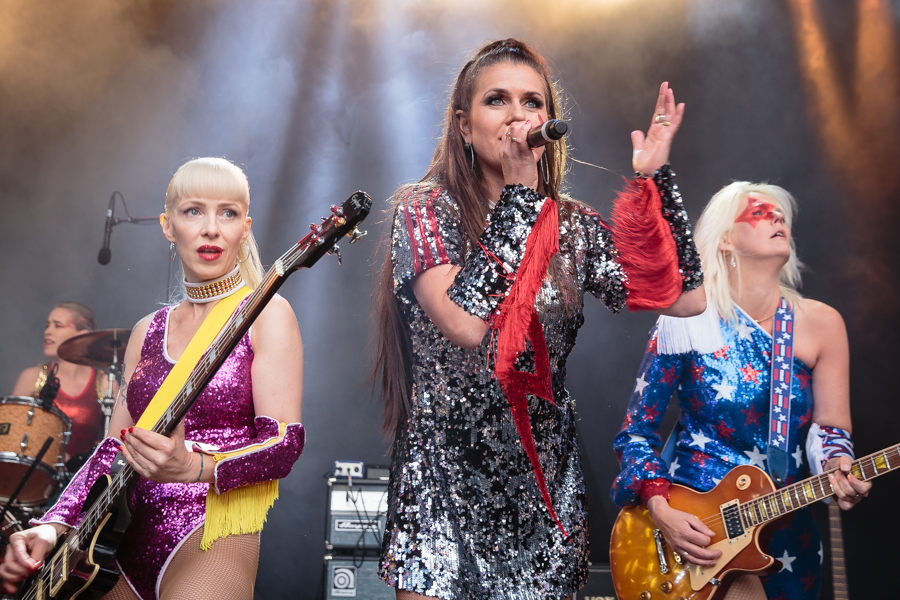
- Cocktail Slippers

Background information
- Origin: Oslo, Norway
- Genres: garage rock, rock and roll, power pop
- Years active: 2001–present
- Label: Wicked Cool Records
- Members: Rocket Queen (guitar); Vega (guitar); Sugar (bass); SMASH (drums); Flame (vocals)
- Past members: Miss A Okay (drums); Squirrel (guitar); Bella Donna (drums); Piper (keyboard); Aurora De Morales (bass); Tammy Lee Sticks (drums); Modesty Blaze (vocals/keyboard); Hope (vocals)
- Website: thecocktailslippers.com

Cocktail Slippers is a five-piece, all-female, garage rock/ power pop band from Oslo, Norway.

Cocktail Slippers was formed in 2001 and has since released five studio albums. They are known for their energetic live performances and have played alongside artists such as Nancy Sinatra, Crowded House, Elvis Costello and The Strokes. The band is continuously touring Europe and the US.

The band's main musical influences are 70's rock, like Black Sabbath and Led Zeppelin, as well as 90's Scandinavian rock.

== Background ==
Cocktail Slippers were formed in Oslo in early 2001, evolving out of the all-female band The Barbarellas. After the original group dissolved, several former members regrouped with a new drummer and adopted the name Cocktail Slippers. The band released its debut album Rock It! in 2001 on the Norwegian label MTG and quickly became known for its high-energy garage rock sound and frequent live performances in Norway.

The band’s second album Mastermind (2004) generated little commercial impact and led to limited national exposure, with no significant international breakthrough at the time.

In 2003, while touring Oslo with Bruce Springsteen, Steven Van Zandt discovered the band after buying their debut album in a local record store. He subsequently began playing their songs on his radio show Little Steven’s Underground Garage. Van Zandt later signed Cocktail Slippers to his label Wicked Cool Records, claiming that they were, in fact, the reason the record company came to be.

In 2009 the band released Saint Valentine’s Day Massacre, produced in collaboration with Van Zandt. Besides own material, the album holds two songs written by Little Steven: "Saint Valentine's Day Massacre" and "Heard You Got a Thing for Me", and features cover versions of Lesley Gore's "She's a Fool" and Connie Francis' "Don't Ever Leave Me". The album received strong reviews internationally and marked the band’s widest exposure to date, including festival appearances in Europe and the United States, among them repeated invitations to South by Southwest.

During the 2010s, Cocktail Slippers underwent several lineup changes and gradually shifted toward a more pop-oriented sound, most notably on their fourth album People Talk (2014). The band continued touring, appeared in the television series Lilyhammer, and took part in a range of live events and collaborations.

In 2012, they participated in the national finals of the Eurovision song contest, and performed alongside artists like Bruce Springsteen, Paul McCartney, and Iggy & The Stooges at Hard Rock Calling in Hyde Park, London.

The extended gap between People Talk and the band’s fifth album was caused by multiple lineup changes, parental leave among band members, and the COVID-19 pandemic. Cocktail Slippers returned with Shout It Out Loud! in 2021 on Wicked Cool Records. Since then, the band has resumed regular touring in the United States and Europe, released new recordings including the EP Talking About Love (2024), and remained active as a live act.

In January 2026, the band posted a call for a new vocalist after it became clear that Silje Hope would be leaving. Just weeks later, they announced Sandra Szabo as their new singer. She took the stagename "Flame".

== Visual style ==
The band has always been conscious of its visual expression, and over the years has experimented with different looks. They’ve performed as sailor girls, tennis players, and gangsters. More recently, they’ve collaborated with the designer Cårejånni Enderud, who has added glam and glitter to their costumes. The idea is to convey a sense of girl power, in a style reminiscent of WWE wrestling with exaggerated costumes – superheroes covered in glitter.

Camp is important both for their stage names and overall style. The band's name references the look of Alexis from the TV soap Dynasty, and they typically use that TV series' theme song to start their concerts.

== Personnel ==
=== Members ===
Current members

- Stine "Rocket Queen" Bendiksen – lead guitar, backing vocals (2001–present)
- Astrid "Sugar" Waller – bass, backing vocals (2001–2012, 2016–present)
- Maria "Smash" Storaas – drums, percussion (2022–present)
- Sara "Vega" Andersson – lead guitar, backing vocals (2018–present)
- Sandra "Flame" Szabo – vocals (2026–present)

Former members

- Ingjerd "Modesty Blaze" Sandven Kleivan (also "Lisa Farfisa") – lead and backing vocals, keyboards (2001–2011)
- Marianne "Tammy Lee Sticks" Otterstad – drums, percussion (2001–2008)
- Ann Kristin "Miss A-OK" Gåsbakk – drums, percussion (2019–2022)
- Lill "Aurora de Morales" Hallbakken– bass, backing vocals (2012–2016)
- Thea Sofie "Piper" Melberg – keyboards, backing vocals (2011–2016)
- Silje "Hope" Hope – lead vocals (2011–2026)
- Lene "Zomba" Vinje (also "Squirrel") – guitar, backing vocals (2005–2012, 2015–2018)
- Bente "Bella Donna" Larsen – drums, percussion (2008–2019)

== Discography ==
=== Albums ===
- 2001 - Rock It!, MTG Records, Norway (CD)
- 2004 - Mastermind, MTG Records, Norway (CD)
- 2007 - Mastermind, Wicked Cool Records, US (CD + digital download) – re-release with a new cover photo
- 2009 - Saint Valentine's Day Massacre, Wicked Cool Records, US (CD + digital download)
- 2009 - Saint Valentine's Day Massacre, Wicked Cool Records, US (vinyl w/2 bonus tracks: "Go Get It!" and "Good Luck Charm")
- 2009 - Rock It!, Wicked Cool Records, US (CD + digital download) re-release
- 2014 - People Talk, Wicked Cool Records, US (Vinyl, CD + digital download)
- 2021 - Shout It Out Loud!, Wicked Cool Records, US (Vinyl, CD + digital download)

=== EP, singles ===
- 2003 - Housewives From Hell, Attitude Records, Finland (limited 12" vinyl)
- 2004 - "Last Christmas"/"Kids In America", Flipside Records, Norway (limited CD single)
- 2009 - "Saint Valentine's Day Massacre", Wicked Cool Records, US (7" vinyl)
- 2009 - "Last Christmas", Wicked Cool Records, US (digital download) re-release
- 2012 - "Keeps on Dancing", Wicked Cool Records, US (digital download)
- 2012 - "Soul Salvation of Love", Wicked Cool Records, US (digital download)
- 2018 - "Excuse Me", Wicked Cool Records, US (single + digital download)
- 2020 - "Night Train", Wicked Cool Records, US (single + digital download)
- 2020 - "Like A Song Stuck In My Head", Wicked Cool Records, US (single + digital download)
- 2020 - "City On Fire", Wicked Cool Records, US (single + digital download)
- 2021 - "She Devil"/"Too Good To Be True", Wicked Cool Records, US (single + digital download)
- 2021 - "Be The One", Wicked Cool Records, US (single + digital download)
- 2021 - "I'll Be Here For You", Wicked Cool Records, US (single + digital download)
- 2023 - "Enda Mere Julepønk i Norge", Fucking North Pole Records (vinyl + digital download)
- 2023 - "Good Love", Wicked Cool Records, US (single + digital download)
- 2023 - "123", Wicked Cool Records, US (single + digital download)
- 2024 - "I Still Dream You", Wicked Cool Records, US (single + digital download)
- 2024: «The Renegade Sessions», Wicked Cool Records (7" single for exclusive sale at gigs)
- 2024: Talking About Love, Wicked Cool Records – EP
- 2025 - "Back Where You Belong", Wicked Cool Records, US (single + digital download)
- 2026 - "Joyride", Wicked Cool Records, US (single + digital download)

=== Appears on ===
- 2007 - Coolest Songs Of The World Vol. 2, Wicked Cool Records, US (compilation CD)
- 2008 - Christmas A Go-Go, Wicked Cool Records, US (compilation CD + digital download)
- 2010 - It's Christmas, Wicked Cool Records, US (digital download)
- 2015 - Deaf Before Compromise... A Volumen Brutale tribute to Backstreet Girls, Voices of Wonder, Norway (vinyl + digital download)
