= The Charms =

American garage rock band

- Origin: Somerville, Massachusetts, United States
- Genres: Garage rock, rock
- Years active: 2002–2015
- Labels: Red Car Records
- Members: Ellie Vee; Joe Wizda; Kat Kina; Jason Sloan
- Past members: Stu Yaffe; Pete Stone; Dennis Burke; Chris Farrell; Ethan Jon Kreitzer; Prince Frederick; Jason Meeker; Mark Nigro
- Website: Official website

The Charms are an American garage rock band from Somerville, Massachusetts, United States, who were formed in 2002. Following 8 straight years of releasing records and touring the band went on a hiatus and returned for a few one off shows before releasing the "Deep End Of The Dial" EP in 2015.They have performed on and off the last several years. The first single called "Gimme Your Love" recorded by Scott Riebling (Letters To Cleo) was well received. The most recent lineup consisted of Ellie Vee, Joe Wizda, Kat Kina, Mark Nigro, and Jason Sloan. The band teamed with local Boston based management company Twisted Rico Management (Steev Riccardo) and formed Red Car Records in 2003.

In September 2015, the band released the single "B.O.S.T.O.N", also recorded and mixed by Scott Riebling. Due to having children and other obligations, the band has been on a long break since but have not ruled out reuniting at some point.

== Discography ==
=== Albums ===
Year	Title	Label
2015	Deep End Of The Dial (EP)	Red Car Records
2007	Heroes and Villains (EP)	Red Car Records
2007	Strange Magic	Wicked Cool Records, licensed for reissue by Red Car Records
2006	Easy Trouble DVD	Red Car Records
2005	Pussycat	Red Car Records
2004	So Pretty (EP)	Primary Voltage, licensed for reissue by Red Car Records
2003	Charmed, I'm Sure	Red Car Records

=== Other releases ===
- 2004 Christmas with the Kranks soundtrack Hollywood Records
- 2011 The Scandalous Years compilation Twisted Rico Recordings
