= Ghost of Tom Joad Tour =

1995–97 concert tour by Bruce Springsteen

- Tour by Bruce Springsteen
- Associated album: The Ghost of Tom Joad
- Start date: November 21, 1995
- End date: May 26, 1997
- Legs: 7
- No. of shows: 128

Bruce Springsteen concert chronology
- Bruce Springsteen 1992–1993 World Tour (1992–93); Ghost of Tom Joad Tour (1995–97); Reunion Tour (1999–2000)

The Ghost of Tom Joad Tour was a worldwide concert tour featuring Bruce Springsteen performing alone on stage in small halls and theatres, that ran off and on from late 1995 through the middle of 1997. It followed the release of his 1995 album The Ghost of Tom Joad.

The tour represented Springsteen's first full-length, solo tour; he traveled with only an instrument technician and a sound engineer. As such it was a marked departure from the high-energy shows with the E Street Band that Springsteen had become famous for. The album itself was quiet, dark, and angry, and Springsteen presented it as such in the shows on the tour. Older songs from Springsteen's catalog, such as "Born in the U.S.A.," were presented in very different, often harsh re-arrangements.

The result, especially in the tour's first leg of shows, was an uncompromising portrayal of pessimism; Jon Pareles of The New York Times said that with the tour's performances, Springsteen "has taken his music to an extreme, a depressive's view of tedious, unending woe." Greg Kot of the Chicago Tribune wrote, "In contrast to past tours, which have been celebratory events tinged by introspection, Springsteen brought a sobering sense of solitude" to the shows of this tour. By some of the later shows of the tour, however, Springsteen relaxed the mood a bit by interweaving a few new songs with an almost comedic bent.

== Itinerary ==
The tour began on November 21, 1995, at the State Theatre in New Brunswick, New Jersey. The first group of shows ran through the end of the year in major media centers such as Los Angeles, the San Francisco Bay Area, Washington, D.C., Philadelphia, New York City, and Boston.

After a winter holiday break, the show visited other North American cities in January 1996, including a stop in Youngstown, Ohio, due to "Youngstown" being the album track most played on radio.

February and March saw shows in Western Europe, followed by a three-week break during which Springsteen attended the Academy Awards show in Los Angeles. The tour resumed in Europe through early May.

A family man with three small children at the time, Springsteen took off the summer of 1996 and then started again in the U.S. in mid-September, playing smaller markets and colleges, as well as local stops in Asbury Park and his old St. Rose of Lima School in Freehold, and finishing in mid-December.

Another winter holiday break was taken, then in late January 1997 Springsteen took the show to Japan and Australia for three weeks. In May the final leg started up; first Springsteen went to Stockholm to accept the Polar Music Prize, then he toured Central Europe, seeing Austria, Poland, and the Czech Republic, before concluding with additional shows back in Western Europe. The 128th and final show of the tour was on May 26, 1997, at the Palais des congrès in Paris and was attended by hundreds of fans from around the world.

== Show ==
While the Ghost of Tom Joad album was in the more acoustic, somber vein of his earlier Nebraska, it did contain some limited additional instrumentation and arrangements. Given that Springsteen was famous for his full-band, high-energy, crowd-rousing concerts, this tour was considered a surprising departure. Advertisements tried to make this clear, and all show tickets were printed with Solo Acoustic Tour on them to give audiences a firm understanding of what to expect.

== Critical and commercial reaction ==
Due to the small venues played on the tour, often in the 2,000–3,000 capacity range, tickets were often hard to get, creating a "ticket scalpers' heaven." Dave Marsh's Two Hearts biography assessed the tour as not expanding Springsteen's audience any, but helping to solidify it, especially in Europe.

The Asbury Park Press characterized a November 1995 Count Basie Theatre show as Springsteen "spinning his acoustic tales of desperation and hope ... he played with power and poise ... The lyrics are bleaker than usual for Springsteen and the music reflects the solemn mood." The New York Times said a December 1995 Beacon Theatre show "easily qualifies as the most earnest concert of the year," that "Where [Springsteen] once saw open highways, he now sees roads to nowhere," and that "Springsteen turned in a painstaking and convincing performance. But with that material, he has turned himself into nearly a one-note performer." The Washington Post, on the other hand, found a December 1995 DAR Constitution Hall performance showing strains of the "sense of triumph" that Springsteen's previous work had evoked, although his physical appearance made him "look more like the custodian at Constitution Hall than the star attraction."

The book Hard Travelin': The Life and Legacy of Woody Guthrie, edited by Robert Santelli and Emily Davidson, praised the tour, saying the album's songs gained onstage and that the shows, "although hushed and void of the anthemic rockers that made him the greatest performer that rock has ever known, managed to bring Woody Guthrie back to life again." Jimmy Gutterman's Runaway American Dream: Listening to Bruce Springsteen criticized the first leg of the tour for producing "the most dour performances of his career". However Guterman praised later legs that incorporated new material that was "sly, low-key, and funny."

== Broadcasts and recordings ==
Portions of the December 8 and December 9, 1995, shows at Philadelphia's Tower Theater were later broadcast on the syndicated Columbia Records Radio Hour on U.S. album-oriented rock stations.

Several shows have been released as part of the Bruce Springsteen Archives:

- Kings Hall, Belfast, Ireland, 19/03/1996, released on September 1, 2017
- Saint Rose of Lima School Gym, Freehold, New Jersey, USA, 11/08/1996, released on May 4, 2018
- Paramount Theater, Asbury Park, New Jersey, USA, 11/24/1996, released on November 1, 2019
- Palais des Congrès Acropolis, Nice, France, 18/05/1997, released on February 5, 2021
- Tower Theater, Pennsylvania, USA, 12/9/1995, released on February 4, 2022
- Paramount Theater, Asbury Park, New Jersey, USA, 11/26/1996, released on November 4, 2022
- EJ Thomas Performing Arts Hall, Akron, Ohio, USA, 25/09/1996, released on February 2, 2024

== Tour dates ==
Date	City	Country	Venue
North America
November 22, 1995	Red Bank	United States	Count Basie Theatre
November 26, 1995	Los Angeles	United States	Wiltern Theater
November 27, 1995	Los Angeles	United States	Wiltern Theater
November 29, 1995	Berkeley	United States	Berkeley Community Theatre
November 30, 1995	Berkeley	United States	Berkeley Community Theatre
December 3, 1995	Rosemont	United States	Rosemont Theatre
December 5, 1995	Washington, D.C.	United States	DAR Constitution Hall
December 6, 1995	Washington, D.C.	United States	DAR Constitution Hall
December 8, 1995	Upper Darby	United States	Tower Theater
December 9, 1995	Upper Darby	United States	Tower Theater
December 12, 1995	New York City	United States	Beacon Theatre
December 13, 1995	New York City	United States	Beacon Theatre
December 15, 1995	Boston	United States	Orpheum Theatre
December 16, 1995	Boston	United States	Orpheum Theatre
December 17, 1995	New York City	United States	Beacon Theatre
January 7, 1996	Montreal	Canada	Salle Wilfrid-Pelletier
January 8, 1996	Toronto	Canada	Massey Hall
January 10, 1996	Detroit	United States	Fox Theatre
January 11, 1996	Detroit	United States	Fox Theatre
January 12, 1996	Youngstown	United States	Stambaugh Auditorium
January 16, 1996	Cleveland	United States	Cleveland Music Hall
January 17, 1996	Cleveland	United States	Cleveland Music Hall
January 18, 1996	St. Louis	United States	Fox Theatre
January 22, 1996	New Orleans	United States	Saenger Theatre
January 23, 1996	Houston	United States	Jesse H. Jones Hall for the Performing Arts
January 25, 1996	Austin	United States	Austin Music Hall
January 26, 1996	Dallas	United States	Bronco Bowl
January 28, 1996	Atlanta	United States	Fox Theatre
Europe
February 12, 1996	Frankfurt	Germany	Alte Oper
February 14, 1996	Dresden	Germany	Kulturpalast
February 15, 1996	Munich	Germany	Rudi-Sedlmayer-Halle
February 17, 1996	Hamburg	Germany	Congress Centrum Hamburg Halle 1
February 18, 1996	Düsseldorf	Germany	Philipshalle
February 21, 1996	Paris	France	Le Zénith
February 22, 1996	Paris	France	Le Zénith
February 25, 1996	Rotterdam	The Netherlands	De Doelen
February 26, 1996	Amsterdam	The Netherlands	Koninklijk Theater Carré
February 28, 1996	Manchester	England	Manchester Apollo
February 29, 1996	Birmingham	England	Symphony Hall
March 2, 1996	Newcastle	England	Newcastle City Hall
March 3, 1996	Edinburgh	Scotland	Edinburgh Playhouse
March 13, 1996	Stockholm	Sweden	Cirkus
March 14, 1996	Oslo	Norway	Oslo Spektrum
March 16, 1996	Copenhagen	Denmark	Falkoner Salen
March 19, 1996	Belfast	Northern Ireland	King's Hall
March 20, 1996	Dublin	Ireland	Point Theatre
April 10, 1996	Rome	Italy	Auditorium Santa Cecilia
April 11, 1996	Milan	Italy	Teatro Smeraldo
April 13, 1996	Genoa	Italy	Teatro Carlo Felice
April 16, 1996	London	England	Royal Albert Hall
April 17, 1996	London	England	Royal Albert Hall
April 19, 1996	Berlin	Germany	ICC Berlin Halle 1
April 20, 1996	Antwerp	Belgium	Koningin Elisabethzaal
April 22, 1996	London	England	Royal Albert Hall
April 24, 1996	London	England	Brixton Academy
April 25, 1996	London	England	Brixton Academy
April 27, 1996	London	England	Royal Albert Hall
April 30, 1996	Strasbourg	France	Palais de la musique et des congrès
May 1, 1996	Brussels	Belgium	Palais des Beaux-Arts
May 2, 1996	Zürich	Switzerland	Kongresshaus Zürich
May 6, 1996	Barcelona	Spain	Teatro Tivoli
May 7, 1996	Barcelona	Spain	Teatro Tivoli
May 8, 1996	Madrid	Spain	Palacio de Congresos
North America
September 16, 1996	Pittsburgh	United States	Benedum Center
September 18, 1996	Wallingford	United States	Oakdale Theatre
September 19, 1996	Providence	United States	Providence Performing Arts Center
September 24, 1996	Kalamazoo	United States	James W. Miller Auditorium
September 25, 1996	Akron	United States	E.J. Thomas Performing Arts Hall
September 26, 1996	Ann Arbor	United States	Hill Auditorium
October 1, 1996	Normal	United States	Braden Auditorium
October 2, 1996	Milwaukee	United States	Riverside Theater
October 3, 1996	Minneapolis	United States	Northrop Auditorium
October 15, 1996	Salt Lake City	United States	Abravanel Hall
October 16, 1996	Denver	United States	Paramount Theatre
October 17, 1996	Denver	United States	Paramount Theatre
October 19, 1996	Albuquerque	United States	Kiva Auditorium
October 21, 1996	Tempe	United States	Grady Gammage Memorial Auditorium
October 22, 1996	San Diego	United States	Civic Theatre
October 23, 1996	Fresno	United States	William Saroyan Theatre
October 25, 1996	Santa Barbara	United States	Arlington Theatre
October 26, 1996	San Jose	United States	Event Center Arena
October 28, 1996	Portland	United States	Arlene Schnitzer Concert Hall
October 29, 1996	Seattle	United States	Paramount Theatre
November 8, 1996	Freehold	United States	Saint Rose of Lima School
November 12, 1996	Buffalo	United States	Shea's Performing Arts Center
November 13, 1996	Syracuse	United States	Landmark Theatre
November 14, 1996	Lowell	United States	Lowell Memorial Auditorium
November 19, 1996	Memphis	United States	Ellis Auditorium
November 20, 1996	Louisville	United States	The Louisville Palace
November 21, 1996	Indianapolis	United States	Murat Theatre
November 24, 1996	Asbury Park	United States	Paramount Theatre
November 25, 1996	Asbury Park	United States	Paramount Theatre
November 26, 1996	Asbury Park	United States	Paramount Theatre
December 2, 1996	Sunrise	United States	Sunrise Musical Theater
December 3, 1996	Sunrise	United States	Sunrise Musical Theater
December 5, 1996	Columbia	United States	Township Auditorium
December 6, 1996	Birmingham	United States	Birmingham-Jefferson Civic Center Concert Hall
December 10, 1996	Cincinnati	United States	Music Hall
December 11, 1996	Columbus	United States	National Veterans Memorial and Museum
December 12, 1996	Nashville	United States	Ryman Auditorium
December 14, 1996	Charlotte	United States	Ovens Auditorium
Japan
January 27, 1997	Tokyo	Japan	Kokusai Forum Hall
January 29, 1997	Tokyo	Japan	Kokusai Forum Hall
January 30, 1997	Tokyo	Japan	Kokusai Forum Hall
January 31, 1997	Tokyo	Japan	Kokusai Forum Hall
Australia
February 4, 1997	Brisbane	Australia	QPAC Concert Hall
February 5, 1997	Brisbane	Australia	QPAC Concert Hall
February 7, 1997	Sydney	Australia	Capitol Theatre
February 8, 1997	Sydney	Australia	Capitol Theatre
February 10, 1997	Sydney	Australia	Capitol Theatre
February 11, 1997	Sydney	Australia	Capitol Theatre
February 12, 1997	Sydney	Australia	Capitol Theatre
February 15, 1997	Melbourne	Australia	Palais Theatre
February 16, 1997	Melbourne	Australia	Palais Theatre
February 17, 1997	Melbourne	Australia	Palais Theatre
Europe
May 6, 1997	Vienna	Austria	Austria Center Vienna
May 7, 1997	Vienna	Austria	Austria Center Vienna
May 9, 1997	Warsaw	Poland	Sala Kongresowa
May 10, 1997	Warsaw	Poland	Sala Kongresowa
May 12, 1997	Prague	Czech Republic	Congress Center
May 15, 1997	Lyon	France	Maurice Ravel Auditorium
May 16, 1997	Montpellier	France	Berlioz Opera House
May 18, 1997	Nice	France	Acropolis
May 19, 1997	Toulon	France	Zénith Omega
May 21, 1997	Florence	Italy	Teatro Verdi
May 22, 1997	Naples	Italy	Teatro Augusteo
May 25, 1997	Paris	France	Palais des congrès de Paris
May 26, 1997	Paris	France	Palais des congrès de Paris

== Songs performed ==
Originals

Greetings from Asbury Park, New Jersey

- "The Angel"
- "Blinded By the Light"
- "Does This Bus Stop at 82nd Street?"
- "For You"
- "Growin' Up"
- "It's Hard to Be a Saint in the City"
- "Spirit in the Night"

The Wild, the Innocent & the E Street Shuffle

- "4th of July, Asbury Park (Sandy)"
- "Rosalita (Come Out Tonight)"
- "Wild Billy's Circus Story"

Darkness on the Edge of Town

- "Adam Raised a Cain"
- "Darkness on the Edge of Town"
- "The Promised Land"
- "Racing in the Street"

The River

- "I Wanna Marry You"
- "Independence Day"
- "Point Blank"
- "The River"
- "Two Hearts"
- "You Can Look (But You Better Not Touch)"

Nebraska

- "Atlantic City"
- "Highway Patrolman"
- "Johnny 99"
- "Mansion on the Hill"
- "My Father's House"
- "Nebraska"
- "Open All Night"
- "Reason to Believe"
- "State Trooper"
- "Used Cars"

Born in the U.S.A.

- "Bobby Jean"
- "Born in the U.S.A."
- "No Surrender"
- "My Hometown"
- "Working on the Highway"

Tunnel of Love

- "All That Heaven Will Allow"
- "Spare Parts"
- "Tougher Than the Rest"
- "When You're Alone"

Human Touch

- "Pony Boy"

Lucky Town

- "If I Should Fall Behind"

Greatest Hits

- "Murder Incorporated"
- "Streets of Philadelphia"
- This Hard Land"

The Ghost of Tom Joad

- "Across the Border"
- "Balboa Park"
- "Dry Lightning"
- "Galveston Bay"
- "The Ghost of Tom Joad"
- "Highway 29"
- "The Line"
- "My Best Was Never Good Enough"
- "The New Timer"
- "Sinaloa Cowboys"
- "Straight Time"
- "Youngstown"

Other

- "Brothers Under the Bridge"
- "Dead Man Walkin'"
- "The Hitter"
- "I'm Turning Into Elvis"
- "In Freehold"
- "In Michigan"
- "It's the Little Things That Count"
- "Long Time Comin'"
- "Pilgrim in the Temple of Love"
- "Red Headed Woman"
- "Seeds"
- "Sell It and They Will Come"
- "Shut Out the Light"
- "There Will Never Be Any Other for Me But You"
- "The Wish"

Cover songs

- "Blowing Down the Road (Old Dusty Road)"
- "Deportee (Plane Wreck at Los Gatos)"
- "Diamonds in the Yard"
- "Homestead"
- "I Don't Want to Go Home"
- "O Sole Mio"
- "Tom Joad (aka The Ballad of Tom Joad)"

Soundchecked/on setlist but not performed

- "I Wish I Were Blind"
- "Local Hero"
- "Souls of the Departed"
- "Thunder Road"

== Sources ==
- Guterman, Jimmy. Runaway American Dream: Listening to Bruce Springsteen. Cambridge: DeCapo Press, 2005.
- Marsh, Dave. Bruce Springsteen on Tour: 1968–2005. Bloomsbury USA, 2006. ISBN 1-59691-282-0.
- Santelli, Robert, "Beyond Folk: Woody Guthrie's Impact on Rock and Roll", in Robert Santelli and Emily Davidson, eds. Hard Travelin': The Life and Legacy of Woody Guthrie. Hanover: Wesleyan University Press, 1999.
- Santelli, Robert. Greetings From E Street: The Story of Bruce Springsteen and the E Street Band. San Francisco: Chronicle Books, 2006. ISBN 0-8118-5348-9
- Killing Floor's concert database supplies the itinerary and set lists for the shows, but does not support direct linking to individual dates.
- Brucebase the same, with ticket and promotional images as well.
