= Mary Queen of Arkansas =

Song by Bruce Springsteen

from the album Greetings from Asbury Park, N.J.
- Released: January 5, 1973
- Recorded: August–September 1972
- Studio: 914 Sound (Blauvelt, New York)
- Genre: Rock
- Length: 5:20
- Label: Columbia
- Songwriter: Bruce Springsteen
- Producers: Mike Appel; Jim Cretecos

Greetings from Asbury Park, N.J. track listing
- 9 tracks Side one: 1. "Blinded by the Light"; 2. "Growin' Up"; 3. "Mary Queen of Arkansas"; 4. "Does This Bus Stop at 82nd Street?"; 5. "Lost in the Flood"; Side two: 1. "The Angel"; 2. "For You"; 3. "Spirit in the Night"; 4. "It's Hard to Be a Saint in the City"

"Mary Queen of Arkansas" is a song by Bruce Springsteen from the album Greetings from Asbury Park, N.J., released in 1973. Springsteen played "Mary Queen of Arkansas" at his audition for John H. Hammond at CBS Records, who signed him to his first record contract on May 2, 1972, although Hammond was less impressed with this song than with "It's Hard to Be a Saint in the City" or with "Growin' Up". The day after signing the contract, Springsteen recorded "Mary Queen of Arkansas" as part of a 12-song demo for Hammond. The demo version of the song was released on the Tracks box set in 1998.

== Themes ==
The song is one of the slower tracks on Greetings from Asbury Park, N.J., played on acoustic guitar, and the lyrics of the song may be about a drag queen. Bruce confirmed this at a concert in Pittsburgh, Pennsylvania, at the Soldiers and Sailors Memorial Hall on May 22, 2014, while speaking to the audience. The lyrics are dense and reminiscent of Bob Dylan. "Mary Queen Of Arkansas" is a slow, quiet acoustic song with a faint country feel to it. The lyrics contain repeated references to the circus (a theme explored further on his album The Wild, the Innocent & the E-Street Shuffle, released in November the same year) as in "Well I'm just a lonely acrobat, the live wire is my trade" and "The big top is for dreamers, we can take the circus all the way to the border." It comes across as a love song dedicated to "Mary".

== Personnel ==
According to authors Philippe Margotin and Jean-Michel Guesdon:

- Bruce Springsteen – vocals, acoustic guitar, harmonica
