= The Angel (song) =

Song by Bruce Springsteen

from the album Greetings from Asbury Park, N.J.
- A-side: "Blinded By the Light"
- Released: January 5, 1973
- Recorded: 1972
- Studio: 914 Sound Studios, Blauvelt, New York
- Genre: Rock
- Length: 3:24
- Label: Columbia
- Songwriter: Bruce Springsteen
- Producers: Mike Appel; Jim Cretecos

Greetings from Asbury Park, N.J. track listing
- 9 tracks Side one: 1. "Blinded by the Light"; 2. "Growin' Up"; 3. "Mary Queen of Arkansas"; 4. "Does This Bus Stop at 82nd Street?"; 5. "Lost in the Flood"; Side two: 1. "The Angel"; 2. "For You"; 3. "Spirit in the Night"; 4. "It's Hard to Be a Saint in the City"

"The Angel" is a song by Bruce Springsteen from the album Greetings from Asbury Park, N.J. in 1973. It was also released as the B-side to Springsteen's "Blinded by the Light" single. The song was part of the demo that Springsteen recorded for John Hammond of CBS Records in advance of getting his first recording contract. At the time Greetings from Asbury Park, N.J. was released, Springsteen considered it his most sophisticated song. It has had very few live performances.

== Music and lyrics ==
The song is one of the slower tracks on Greetings from Asbury Park, N.J., played on piano. However, late in the recording sessions for Greetings from Asbury Park, N.J., Richard Davis overdubbed an upright bass part for the song. The lyrics of the song are about a motorcycle outlaw. The lyrics are full of automobile imagery. One line: "The interstate's choked with nomadic hordes" may have been later reworked into the classic line "The highway's jammed with broken heroes" on "Born to Run".

The lyrics describe a man referred to as "the angel" and a woman who is "Madison Avenue's claim to fame in a trainer bra with eyes like rain." This song has a fully developed automobile theme, including some lines such as "The interstate's choked with nomadic hordes/in Volkswagen vans with full running boards dragging great anchors/Followin' dead-end signs into the sores/The angel rides by humpin' his hunk metal whore". Another notable line refers to the "hubcap heaven." Springsteen took one of his early rare photos in front of this site in Howell, New Jersey. The referenced "Hubcap Heaven" is now known as "The Hubcap Farm" and is still in business. Aside from an October 6, 1973 performance in Radnor, Pennsylvania, Springsteen said he would never play this song live, and he went 23 years keeping that promise. In London, on April 22, 1996, during his acoustic Ghost of Tom Joad Tour, he played the song. Until late 2009, that had only been its second live performance. However, on November 22, 2009, in Buffalo, New York, which was the final 2009 show of his scheduled Working On A Dream Tour, he and the E Street Band performed the song, as part of the entirety of the Greetings from Asbury Park, N.J. album. It was the first performance of the song with the E Street Band.

== Personnel ==
According to authors Philippe Margotin and Jean-Michel Guesdon:

- Bruce Springsteen – vocals
- David Sancious – piano
- Richard Davis – double bass
