= Lost in the Flood =

Song by Bruce Springsteen

Song by Bruce Springsteen

from the album Greetings from Asbury Park, N.J.
- Released: January 5, 1973
- Recorded: August–September 1972
- Studio: 914 Sound Studios, Blauvelt, New York
- Genre: Rock
- Length: 5:17
- Label: Columbia
- Songwriter: Bruce Springsteen
- Producers: Mike Appel; Jim Cretecos

Greetings from Asbury Park, N.J. track listing
- 9 tracks Side one: 1. "Blinded by the Light"; 2. "Growin' Up"; 3. "Mary Queen of Arkansas"; 4. "Does This Bus Stop at 82nd Street?"; 5. "Lost in the Flood"; Side two: 1. "The Angel"; 2. "For You"; 3. "Spirit in the Night"; 4. "It's Hard to Be a Saint in the City"

"Lost in the Flood" is a song by the American singer-songwriter Bruce Springsteen. It was released on his debut album, Greetings from Asbury Park, N.J. in 1973.

== Music and themes ==
"Lost in the Flood" is a sparse, piano-driven song, seemingly about a Vietnam War veteran. This is the first of many epic Springsteen songs that elicit strong emotions, usually of despair, grief, and a small glimpse of hope. The treatment of veterans in the United States has always been a sore spot for Springsteen. The lyrics tell a loose story, invoking a series of images that tell three different stories for each of the three verses.

=== Lyrics ===
The first verse is about a "ragamuffin gunner" and has a recurring theme of religion, including references to the "hit-and-run" pleading for "sanctuary" and hiding beneath a "holy stone", while "breakin' beams and crosses with a spastic's reeling perfection" and "nuns run bald through Vatican halls, pregnant, pleading Immaculate Conception". Finally, "everybody's wrecked on Main Street from drinking unholy blood".

The second verse is about a "pure American brother", "Jimmy the Saint", perhaps the same person as the "ragamuffin gunner" from the first verse. This is the beginning of Springsteen's use of automobile themes (along with "The Angel"), as the pure American brother "races Sundays in Jersey in a Chevy stock Super Eight" and "leans on the hood telling racing stories". Eventually, Jimmy the Saint gets into some sort of accident (described as running "headfirst into a hurricane") and presumably dies since "there was nothing left but some blood where the body fell".

The third verse concerns a series of people on the streets of a city, presumably New York. They include "Eighth Avenue sailors in satin shirts", "some storefront incarnation of Maria", "Bronx's best apostle", "the cops", "the whiz-bang gang" and "some kid" who gets shot in the ensuing gun fight and holds "his leg, screaming something in Spanish".

== Personnel ==
Personnel according to Greetings from Asbury Park, N.J. liner notes, and authors Philippe Margotin and Jean-Michel Guesdon:

- Bruce Springsteen – vocals
- Vini "Mad Dog" Lopez – drums
- Garry Tallent – bass
- David Sancious – piano, organ
- Steven Van Zandt – explosion sound effect through amplifier in the beginning. (Uncredited and denied by Van Zandt)
