= 4th of July, Asbury Park (Sandy) =

1973 song by Bruce Springsteen

Single by Bruce Springsteen

from the album The Wild, the Innocent & the E Street Shuffle
- B-side: "The E Street Shuffle"
- Released: 1974 (Germany only)
- Recorded: 1973
- Studio: 914 Sound Studios in Blauvelt, New York
- Genre: Folk; rock
- Length: 5:36
- Label: Columbia
- Songwriter: Bruce Springsteen
- Producers: Mike Appel; Jim Cretecos

Bruce Springsteen singles chronology
"Spirit in the Night" (1973)	"4th of July, Asbury Park (Sandy)" (1974)	"Born to Run" (1975)

"Sandy (4th of July, Asbury Park)"

Single by The Hollies

from the album Another Night
- B-side: "Second Hand Hang-Ups"
- Released: May 1975
- Genre: Easy listening
- Label: Polydor
- Songwriter: Bruce Springsteen
- Producer: Ron Richards

The Hollies singles chronology
"I'm Down" (1974)	"Sandy (4th of July, Asbury Park)" (1975)	"Boulder to Birmingham" (1976)

"4th of July, Asbury Park (Sandy)", often known just as "Sandy", is a 1973 song by Bruce Springsteen, originally appearing as the second song on his album The Wild, the Innocent & the E Street Shuffle. It was released as a single from the album in Germany.

One of the best-known and most praised of his early efforts, the song remains one of his most popular ballads, and has been described as "the perfect musical study of the Jersey Shore boardwalk culture".

== Themes and recording ==
Set on, as the title suggests, the Fourth of July in Asbury Park, New Jersey, the song is a powerful love ballad, dedicated to one Sandy and describing the depressing atmosphere that threatens to smother the love between the singer and Sandy. Locals include the "stoned-out faces", "switchblade lovers" and "the greasers" who "tramp the streets or get busted for sleeping on the beach all night". The singer is tired of "hangin' in them dusty arcades" and "chasin' the factory girls".

The song begins with the line: "Sandy, the fireworks are hailin' over Little Eden tonight." Writer Ariel Swartley views the song's verses as depicting the narrator as something of an "adolescent loser ... [who's] ruining his chances with the girl: he can't stop telling her about the humiliations, about the girls who led him on, about the waitress that got tired of him." Nevertheless, Swartley observes the choruses to be warm, immediate, and portray an irresistibly romantic atmosphere.

You travel around [to] Nashville, Atlanta, Tennessee and [people say] 'Hey! What's Asbury Park like?' and I play them this number. This is a song based in New Jersey or actually anywhere along the coast.

— Bruce Springsteen, Concert, 3rd March 1974

Van Morrison's influence can be heard in this song, as "4th of July, Asbury Park (Sandy)" closely parallels his romanticization of Belfast in such songs as "Cyprus Avenue" and "Madame George" from the 1968 album, Astral Weeks.

"Sandy" showcases the wistful side of Springsteen; Los Angeles Times writer Robert Hilburn later wrote that "the verses [were] whispered as if he was singing into his girlfriend's ear." During recording of the song for the album, Springsteen wanted a children's choir to sing on it, but they did not show up for the session. Instead, he recorded the high, clear voice of Suki Lahav, overdubbing it repeatedly, to give a choir-like effect. Lahav, the wife of Springsteen's sound engineer at the time, would not be credited for her role, but would later join the E Street Band for six months as a violinist and singer.

No singles were released from The Wild, the Innocent & the E Street Shuffle. "Sandy" would, however, along with "Rosalita (Come Out Tonight)", become fan favorites from the album, and would garner progressive rock radio airplay during the ramp-up of Springsteen's visibility preceding the 1975 release of Born to Run. The song would be released as a single in Germany in mid-1975, with the title reversed into "Sandy (4th July, Asbury Park)". "Sandy" also attracted the attention of other musicians; it was one of the two Springsteen songs that drummer Max Weinberg knew when he auditioned for Springsteen's E Street Band in late 1974. Once Born to Run made Springsteen a major rock figure, "Sandy" received additional airplay on progressive and album oriented rock formats.

== Live performance history ==
"Sandy" was included on Springsteen and the E Street Band's best-selling 1986 box set Live/1975–85, in a 1980 Nassau Coliseum performance that nevertheless had a "club feel" to it. Its sequencing in the box set represented the opening stages of the journey that the core characters in Springsteen's work take; Springsteen said, "Then you get 'Sandy'. That's the guy and he's on the boardwalk, and I guess that was me then, when I was still around Asbury. And there's the girl.... Here it is. This is the beginning of the whole trip that's about to take place." It is also included on the 2003 compilation The Essential Bruce Springsteen. The song was a mainstay of Springsteen and the E Street Band's concert set lists during the early part of his career, and a 1975 performance is included on the 2006 Hammersmith Odeon London '75 audio and video release. It became much rarer to hear after the 1980–1981 River Tour, appearing only very sporadically, and then usually in New Jersey.

Within the E Street Band, the song was heavily identified with Danny Federici's accordion part, which is the main musical element. "Sandy" was played several times late on the first leg of the 2007–2008 Magic Tour, including Federici's final regular appearance in November 2007 before taking a leave of absence for melanoma treatment. When Federici made his only return to the stage after that, on March 20, 2008, appearing for portions of a Springsteen and E Street Band performance at Conseco Fieldhouse in Indianapolis, "Sandy" was the one song that he requested be performed. Following Federici's April 17, 2008 death, "Sandy" was performed in tribute to him, with Roy Bittan taking over the accordion part. In July 2008, the live EP Magic Tour Highlights was released, with the final Federici performance of "Sandy" the closing track. The song has been played live about 230 times.

== Personnel ==
- Bruce Springsteen - vocals, acoustic guitar, electric guitar, recorder
- Clarence Clemons - saxophone
- Danny Federici - accordion
- David Sancious - electric piano
- Garry Tallent - bass
- Vini "Mad Dog" Lopez - drums
- Suki Lahav - choir vocals

== Covers ==
The Hollies recorded a single of "Sandy" (under that title) in 1975, and included it on their Another Night album. Released on Epic Records in the U.S. in April 1975, it only achieved minor airplay, reaching number 85 on the U.S. pop singles chart. Nonetheless, Record World called it a "winning ballad." It had better success in New Zealand, reaching number 12 on their singles chart. Though released as a single, it did not reach the chart in the UK, though in London it made no.15 on Capital Radio's 'Capital Countdown' Top 40. While not a big hit unto itself, The Hollies' use of "Sandy" presaged other artists mining the early Springsteen songbook for material, a notion that would soon be exploited to much greater commercial success by Manfred Mann's Earth Band and others.

Air Supply recorded "Sandy" for their 1985 album Air Supply. Singer-songwriter Richard Shindell recorded what has been described as a "near-holy reading" of this song for his 2002 live album, Courier.

Jason Heath and the Greedy Souls recorded a version in Los Angeles, 2009 which is officially endorsed by Bruce Springsteen. The band line up features the original E Street Band keyboardist and accordion player Danny Federici's son, Jason Federici. The song was released through Springsteen's website and a video can be seen on YouTube.

Swedish artist Ulf Lundell made a Swedish version of the song called "Sanna, (Nyårsafton Åre 1983) (Sandy)". The song was dedicated to his daughter Sanna, and instead of taking place on 4th of July, it takes place on New Year's Eve.

Ben E. King covered the song on the 1997 tribute album One Step Up/Two Steps Back: The Songs of Bruce Springsteen.

New York hard rock band Kiss released a single titled "Shandi", from their 1980 album Unmasked, with the song title being inspired by Springsteen's Sandy according to Paul Stanley, the only member of Kiss to work on the recording of the song in the studio, although all four members of the group appeared in the song's promotional video clip.

Dutch group Theu Boermans en de groep covered this song in a Dutch language as Venlo'67

== Legacy ==
This song was chosen by Tony Blair as one of his Desert Island Discs, apparently because he listened to it many times when he was courting his future wife Cherie Booth.

== Madam Marie ==
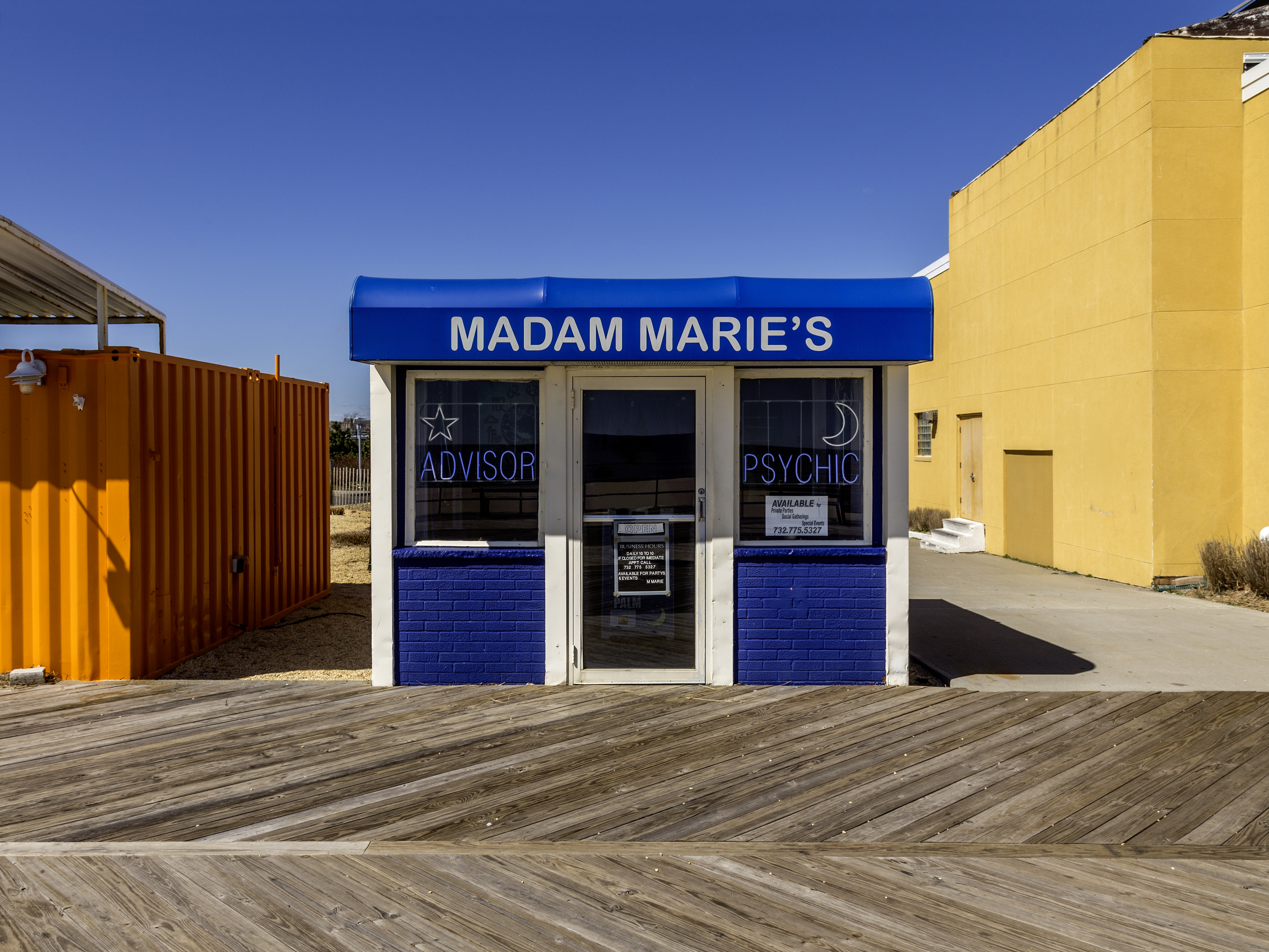
Madam Marie's Temple of Knowledge in 2016

One of the song's most famous lines is:

Did you hear, the cops finally busted Madam Marie,
for tellin' fortunes better than they do ...

The "Madam Marie" mentioned in the song was a real-life fortune teller on the Asbury Park boardwalk named Marie Castello, who died June 27, 2008, aged 93. Springsteen offered memories and condolences of her on his website, saying:

"Back in the day when I was a fixture on the Asbury Park boardwalk, I'd often stop and talk to Madam Marie as she sat on her folding chair outside the Temple of Knowledge. I'd sit across from her on the metal guard rail bordering the beach, and watched as she led the day trippers into the small back room where she would unlock a few of the mysteries of their future. She always told me mine looked pretty good – she was right. The world has lost enough mystery as it is – we need our fortunetellers. We send our condolences out to her family who've carried on her tradition. Over here on E Street, we will miss her."

Springsteen said some of the same remarks on stage during the next show on the Magic Tour, dedicating a performance of "Sandy" in Gothenburg, Sweden on July 4, 2008, to her. Similar dedication took place in Helsinki, Finland a few days later.

The dedication, word-by-word, from Gothenburg:

We always send this one out to Danny,
and just a few days ago, Madam Marie,
who was the gypsy teller in the Asbury Park
boardwalk passed away, she was 98,
that's a lot of fortune-telling.

There's enough mystery lost in the world,
we need all the fortune-tellers we can get,
so tonight we're gonna send this one out to
Madam Marie...

Springsteen incorrectly noted she died at 98; she was in fact 93. The song has always been dedicated to Danny Federici since his death on April 17, 2008, as this was "his" song, featuring a prominent accordion throughout the song.
