= Growin' Up (song) =

1973 song by Bruce Springsteen

Song by Bruce Springsteen

from the album Greetings from Asbury Park, N.J.
- Released: January 5, 1973
- Recorded: August–September 1972
- Studio: 914 Sound Studios, Blauvelt, New York
- Genre: Rock; folk rock; country rock
- Length: 3:05; 2:40 (acoustic version)
- Label: Columbia
- Songwriter: Bruce Springsteen
- Producers: Mike Appel; Jim Cretecos

Greetings from Asbury Park, N.J. track listing
- 9 tracks Side one: 1. "Blinded by the Light"; 2. "Growin' Up"; 3. "Mary Queen of Arkansas"; 4. "Does This Bus Stop at 82nd Street?"; 5. "Lost in the Flood"; Side two: 1. "The Angel"; 2. "For You"; 3. "Spirit in the Night"; 4. "It's Hard to Be a Saint in the City"

"Growin' Up" is a song by American singer Bruce Springsteen from his debut studio album Greetings from Asbury Park, N.J. (1973).

It is a moderately paced tune, concerning an adolescence as a rebellious New Jersey teen, with lyrics written in the first-person. The lyrics feature a chorus that is progressively modified as the song continues, with the first chorus being "I hid in the clouded wrath of the crowd but when they said 'Sit down,' I stood up," while the second chorus switches to "clouded warmth...'come down,' I threw up" and the third finishes the song with "mother breast...'pull down,' I pulled up."

An acoustic version of the song, part of Springsteen's 1972 audition for CBS Records, appears on Tracks, 18 Tracks, and Chapter and Verse.

During the Born to Run tours and following Darkness Tour, Springsteen often performed an extended version of this song, extending it with a long, sometimes exaggerated and/or fictional biographical narration of his youth and his passion for guitar playing.

The song was featured on the soundtracks of the films Big Daddy (1999) and Gracie (2007).

David Bowie recorded a version of this song in the early stages of the Diamond Dogs sessions with Ronnie Wood on lead guitar. In 1990 this was released as a bonus track on the Rykodisc reissue of his Pin Ups album, and in 2004 it appeared on the bonus disc of the 30th anniversary edition of Diamond Dogs. The song has also been covered by Any Trouble, John Hammond, Jr., Portastatic and Alvin Stardust. Pearl Jam and The Bouncing Souls have also played it live. Tori Amos recorded a version of it for her 2001 album Strange Little Girls but it was not included until the 2026 release of the album, as a bonus track.

== Personnel ==
Credits adapted from the Best of Bruce Springsteen liner notes.

- Bruce Springsteen – vocals, acoustic guitar
- Vini "Mad Dog" Lopez – drums
- Garry Tallent – bass
- David Sancious – piano
