= Does This Bus Stop at 82nd Street? =

Song by Bruce Springsteen

from the album Greetings from Asbury Park, N.J.
- Released: January 5, 1973
- Recorded: August–September 1972
- Studio: 914 Sound Studios, Blauvelt, New York
- Genre: Rock
- Length: 2:06
- Label: Columbia
- Songwriter(s): Bruce Springsteen
- Producer(s): Mike Appel; Jim Cretecos

Greetings from Asbury Park, N.J. track listing
- 9 tracks Side one: 1. "Blinded by the Light"; 2. "Growin' Up"; 3. "Mary Queen of Arkansas"; 4. "Does This Bus Stop at 82nd Street?"; 5. "Lost in the Flood"; Side two: 1. "The Angel"; 2. "For You"; 3. "Spirit in the Night"; 4. "It's Hard to Be a Saint in the City"

"Does This Bus Stop at 82nd Street?" is a song by Bruce Springsteen from the album Greetings from Asbury Park, N.J., released in 1973. The song was part of the demo that Springsteen recorded for John Hammond of CBS Records in advance of getting his first recording contract. This demo version was released on Tracks in 1998.

The song is loosely based on a bus ride Springsteen once took to visit a girlfriend in uptown Manhattan. As a result, the song is basically set in Spanish Harlem, although it contains some anomalous references, such as to actress Joan Fontaine. The characters are more thinly sketched than in other songs on Greetings from Asbury Park, N.J., but the song does contain the incongruous rhyming of other Springsteen songs of the period and is full of good humor. Springsteen only rarely plays "Does This Bus Stop at 82nd Street?" in concert, but when he does it is usually enjoyed by the fans.

== Structure and themes ==
"Does This Bus Stop at 82nd Street?" is a beat-style pastiche of a journey through city streets. It is fast-paced and has no chorus. One recognizable theme is a movement towards the sky, as in the lines "drink this and you'll grow wings on your feet", "interstellar mongrel nymphs" and "(Mary Lou) rides to heaven on a gyroscope."

== Personnel ==
According to authors Philippe Margotin and Jean-Michel Guesdon:

- Bruce Springsteen – vocals, acoustic guitars
- Vini "Mad Dog" Lopez – drums
- Gary Tallent – bass
- David Sancious – piano
