= It's Hard to Be a Saint in the City =

Song by Bruce Springsteen

from the album Greetings from Asbury Park, N.J.
- Released: January 5, 1973
- Recorded: 1972
- Studio: 914 Sound, Blauvelt, New York
- Genre: Rock
- Length: 3:13
- Label: Columbia
- Songwriter: Bruce Springsteen
- Producers: Mike Appel; Jim Cretecos

Greetings from Asbury Park, N.J. track listing
- 9 tracks Side one: 1. "Blinded by the Light"; 2. "Growin' Up"; 3. "Mary Queen of Arkansas"; 4. "Does This Bus Stop at 82nd Street?"; 5. "Lost in the Flood"; Side two: 1. "The Angel"; 2. "For You"; 3. "Spirit in the Night"; 4. "It's Hard to Be a Saint in the City"

"It's Hard to Be a Saint in the City" is a song written and performed by the American singer-songwriter Bruce Springsteen on his debut album Greetings from Asbury Park, N.J. in 1973. The song talks about a young man growing up on the streets of a city trying to stay good and do what he believes is right. It has been covered by David Bowie. John Sayles included this song in a high school lunchroom scene of his movie Baby It's You.

== Background ==
The song inspired record producer Mike Appel to quit his job to become Springsteen's manager, even though Springsteen did not have a record contract yet. It was also the first song Springsteen played at his audition at CBS Records for John Hammond, who eventually signed him to a record contract, on May 2, 1972. The following day, he recorded it as part of a 12-song demo for Hammond. The demo version of the song was released on Tracks in 1998. The version included on Greetings from Asbury Park, N.J. was recorded during the summer of 1972 backed by future E-Street Band members David Sancious on piano, Vini Lopez on drums and Garry Tallent on bass.

== Live performances ==
A 1975 live version can be found on the DVD of the Hammersmith Odeon concert that is included in the Born to Run (30th Anniversary Edition) and the Hammersmith Odeon London '75 CDs. A 1978 live version is also included in the Live/1975–85 set.

== David Bowie version ==
David Bowie recorded multiple cover versions of "It's Hard to Be a Saint in the City", most of which went unreleased. One version taped in late 1973 during the sessions for his album Diamond Dogs (1974) eventually surfaced on the 1989 box set Sound + Vision and was later included on The Best of David Bowie 1974/1979 (1998); both releases misidentify the track as an outtake from the Station to Station (1976) album sessions. Upon examination of the track, Tony Visconti suggested the drums were by Aynsley Dunbar, the bass was by Herbie Flowers, and the guitar was by Bowie himself, which would place the recording at the Diamond Dogs sessions in 1973. Visconti believes the string arrangements were his own and adjudged the track to have been recorded during the Diamond Dogs sessions but with added instruments, vocals, and mixing done years later.

Bowie had previously taped renditions of Springsteen's other Greetings songs "Growin' Up" and "Spirit in the Night". Bowie attempted another version of "It's Hard to Be a Saint in the City" in November 1974 during the sessions for Young Americans (1975); this rendition featured a guitar riff which was originally developed for another cover of the Flairs' "Footstompin'" before being incorporated into the original song "Fame". In 2025, archivist Max Ochester claimed to uncover the Young Americans version among a series of tapes purchased from a private collection in Philadelphia. Springsteen himself stopped by during the session at Sigma Sound Studios in Philadelphia. Bowie recalled that he struggled to relate to Springsteen due to his cocaine addiction at the time, and never played Springsteen his version because he was unhappy with it.

== Personnel ==
According to authors Philippe Margotin and Jean-Michel Guesdon:

- Bruce Springsteen – vocals, acoustic guitar
- Vini "Mad Dog" Lopez – drums
- Garry Tallent – bass
- David Sancious – piano
