= For You (Bruce Springsteen song) =

1972 song by Bruce Springsteen

Song by Bruce Springsteen

from the album Greetings from Asbury Park, N.J.
- A-side: "Spirit in the Night"
- Released: January 5, 1973
- Recorded: June 22, 1972
- Studio: 914 Sound Studios, Blauvelt, New York
- Genre: Rock
- Length: 4:40
- Label: Columbia
- Songwriter: Bruce Springsteen
- Producers: Mike Appel; Jim Cretecos

Greetings from Asbury Park, N.J. track listing
- 9 tracks Side one: 1. "Blinded by the Light"; 2. "Growin' Up"; 3. "Mary Queen of Arkansas"; 4. "Does This Bus Stop at 82nd Street?"; 5. "Lost in the Flood"; Side two: 1. "The Angel"; 2. "For You"; 3. "Spirit in the Night"; 4. "It's Hard to Be a Saint in the City"

"For You" is a song written and recorded by the American singer-songwriter Bruce Springsteen in 1972 for his debut album Greetings from Asbury Park, N.J., released in 1973. It was featured as a B-Side to his single "Spirit in the Night" and later included on the compilation album The Essential Bruce Springsteen. The song has been covered by Manfred Mann's Earth Band, The Format, and Greg Kihn.

== Lyrics and music ==
"For You" was recorded at 914 Sound Studios in Blauvelt, New York on June 27, 1972, the same day as the rest of the album except "Blinded by the Light" and "Spirit in the Night". Musicians participating in these sessions included future E Street Band members David Sancious, Garry Tallent and Vini Lopez. It is a climactic, percussion-driven song. Unlike many other songs on Springsteen's debut album, it takes the time to pace and build. The lyrics are about a woman who has attempted suicide. She does not need the singer's "urgency" even though her life is "one long emergency" as Springsteen sings in the chorus (along with "and your cloud line urges me, and my electric surges free"). The singer is committed to doing anything to save her, and admires her ability to hang on.

In many live concerts, including Hammersmith Odeon, London '75, Bruce transformed the song into a tender piano ballad without accompaniment.

== Cover versions ==
=== Greg Kihn version ===
"For You"

Song by Greg Kihn

from the album Greg Kihn Again
- Released: 1977
- Recorded: 1977
- Genre: Rock
- Length: 3:57 (album version); 3:04 (single version)
- Label: Beserkley
- Songwriter: Bruce Springsteen
- Producer: Matthew King Kaufman

The song was also covered by Greg Kihn on his 1977 album Greg Kihn Again. Kihn's cover received favorable comments from Springsteen. It was also included on the compilation album Best of Kihn.

=== Manfred Mann's Earth Band version ===
"For You"

Song by Manfred Mann's Earth Band

from the album Chance
- Released: October 10, 1980
- Genre: Pop rock; hard rock; progressive rock
- Length: 5:41 (album version); 3:53 (single version)
- Label: Bronze
- Songwriter: Bruce Springsteen
- Producers: Manfred Mann; Trevor Rabin

Like "Blinded By The Light" (on The Roaring Silence) and "Spirits in the Night" (on Nightingales & Bombers), this song was covered by Manfred Mann's Earth Band, appearing on their album Chance. As with Manfred Mann Earth Band's previous Springsteen covers, they used a more forceful, rocking arrangement in "For You" than Springsteen did. The Earth Band version built from a more temperate beginning to an explosion of sound in the bridge, and incorporates five guitars and a keyboard solo by Manfred Mann 3/4 of the way into the song. The song was also included on the compilation albums The Best of Manfred Mann's Earth Band and Blinded by the Light & Other Hits. Though the song received FM airplay, the single release did not achieve the success of their other Springsteen covers.

=== Other cover versions ===
This song was also covered by The Format for the Springsteen tribute album Light of Day. This version was also included on their B-Sides & Rarities album.

In 2005 The Disco Boys produced a dance version of the song, sampling the Manfred Mann's Earth Band cover.

== Personnel ==
According to authors Philippe Margotin and Jean-Michel Guesdon:

- Bruce Springsteen – vocals, acoustic guitar
- Vini "Mad Dog" Lopez – drums
- Garry Tallent – bass
- David Sancious – piano, organ

Technical

- Mike Appel – producer
- Jim Cretecos – producer
- Louis Lahav – recording engineer
