= Blinded by the Light =

1973 song by Bruce Springsteen

Single by Bruce Springsteen

from the album Greetings from Asbury Park, N.J.
- B-side: "The Angel"
- Released: February 1973
- Recorded: September 11, 1972
- Studio: 914 Sound Studios, Blauvelt, New York
- Genre: Folk rock; boogie rock; R&B
- Length: 5:06
- Label: Columbia
- Songwriter: Bruce Springsteen
- Producers: Mike Appel; Jim Cretecos

Bruce Springsteen singles chronology
"Blinded by the Light" (1973)	"Spirit in the Night" (1973)

Greetings from Asbury Park, N.J. track listing
- 9 tracks Side one: 1. "Blinded by the Light"; 2. "Growin' Up"; 3. "Mary Queen of Arkansas"; 4. "Does This Bus Stop at 82nd Street?"; 5. "Lost in the Flood"; Side two: 1. "The Angel"; 2. "For You"; 3. "Spirit in the Night"; 4. "It's Hard to Be a Saint in the City"

"Blinded by the Light" is a song written and recorded by Bruce Springsteen, which first appeared on his 1973 debut album Greetings from Asbury Park, N.J. A cover by English rock band Manfred Mann's Earth Band reached number one on the Billboard Hot 100 in the United States in February 1977 and was also a top ten hit in the United Kingdom, New Zealand, and Canada.

== History ==
The song was written after Columbia Records president Clive Davis, upon listening to an early version of Greetings from Asbury Park N.J., felt the album lacked a potential single. Springsteen wrote this song and "Spirit in the Night" in response. "Blinded by the Light" was the first single from Greetings from Asbury Park, N.J. to be released.

According to Springsteen, he wrote the song by going through a rhyming dictionary in search of appropriate words. The first line of the song, "Madman drummers, bummers, and Indians in the summers with a teenage diplomat" is autobiographical. "Madman drummers" is a reference to drummer Vini Lopez, known as "Mad Man" (later changed to "Mad Dog"), "Indians in the summer" refers to the name of Springsteen's old Little League team, "teenage diplomat" refers to himself. "As the adolescent pumps his way into his hat" recalls his aunt Dora Kirby claiming, "Bruce never took his baseball hat off." A "merry-go-round" is baseball slang for the situation in which when a pitcher keeps walking batters. The remainder of the song tells of many unrelated events, with the refrain of "Blinded by the light, cut loose like a deuce, another runner in the night". By Deuce, Springsteen meant a Deuce Coupe — a '32 Ford Hot Rod, running hot or fast.

Cash Box said that it was much like early Dylan, but especially like "My Back Pages", and that Springsteen lets loose with a lyrical barrage of images and pictures. Record World said that the song has some of the cleverest lyrics of all [Springsteen's] material" and that the tune should start Springsteen off towards a bright future.

== Personnel ==
According to authors Philippe Margotin and Jean-Michel Guesdon:

- Bruce Springsteen – vocals, acoustic and electric guitar, bass
- Vini "Mad Dog" Lopez – drums
- Clarence Clemons – saxophone, backing vocals
- Harold Wheeler – piano
- Unknown musicians – organ, tambourine

== Manfred Mann's Earth Band version ==
"Blinded by the Light"
- Side A of the 1976 UK single

Single by Manfred Mann's Earth Band

from the album The Roaring Silence
- B-side: "Starbird No. 2"
- Released: August 6, 1976
- Recorded: 1976, Workhouse Studios, London
- Genre: Progressive rock; hard rock
- Length: 7:08 (album version); 3:48 (single version)
- Label: Bronze (UK); Warner Bros. (USA)
- Songwriter: Bruce Springsteen
- Producers: Manfred Mann and Earth Band

Manfred Mann's Earth Band singles chronology
"Spirits in the Night" (1975)	"Blinded by the Light" (1976)	"Questions" (1976)

Manfred Mann's Earth Band released a version of the song on their 1976 album The Roaring Silence. Their version includes the "Chopsticks" melody played on piano near the end of the bridge of the song. The track reached No. 1 on both the Billboard Hot 100 and the Canadian RPM charts. Manfred Mann's Earth Band's recording of "Blinded by the Light" is Springsteen's only No. 1 single as a songwriter on the Hot 100.

Record World said, "After a synthesized intro reminiscent of 'Won't Get Fooled Again', the group is in full throttle." In 2024, Mann said that he was inspired by Supertramp, particularly "Dreamer", when it came to the synth hook.

=== Lyrics ===
"Blinded by the Light" by Manfred Mann
Chorus whose word "deuce" was mistaken as "douche"

Manfred Mann's Earth Band's recording of the song changes the lyrics. The most prominent change is in the chorus, where Springsteen's "cut loose like a deuce" is replaced with "revved up like a deuce". The lyric is a reference to the 1932 V8-powered Ford automobile, which enthusiasts dubbed the "deuce coupe" (the "deuce" coming from the 2 in 1932, the first year the V8 was available). Springsteen was fond of classic hot rods in his youth, hence the line about the deuce. As the line is a famous example of a mondegreen because it is frequently misheard as "wrapped up like a douche", Springsteen has joked about confusion over the lyrics, claiming that it was not until Manfred Mann rewrote the song to be about a feminine hygiene product that it became popular.

According to Manfred Mann, it was the idea of drummer Chris Slade to use the chords of "Chopsticks" (the tune had at that point already been integrated into the arrangement) as a transition between song parts. The "deuce"/"douche" confusion stems from technical problems (which can be confirmed by comparing to live recordings).

I don't think Springsteen liked our Blinded by the Light, 'cos we sang 'wrapped up like a douche', and it wasn't written like that and I screwed it up completely. It sounded like 'douche' instead of 'deuce', 'cos of the technical process—a faulty azimuth due to tape-head angles, and it meant we couldn't remix it.

Warners in America said, 'You've got to change 'douche', 'cos the Southern Bible belt radio stations think it's about a vaginal douche, and they have problems with body parts down there.' We tried to change it to 'deuce' but then the rest of the track sounded horrible, so we had to leave it. We just said, 'If it's not a hit, it's not.'

But in the end, it was No.1 in America, and so many people came up to us after and said, 'You know why it made No. 1?... Everyone was talking about whether it was deuce or douche.' Apparently Springsteen thought we'd done it deliberately, which we hadn't, so if I ever saw him I'd avoid him and cringe away like a frightened little boy.

— Manfred Mann, Record Collector interview (August 2006)

Manfred was given the album by a deejay in Philadelphia called Ed Sciaky [...] [H]e knew Manfred and loved Manfred's Earth Band and he just brought the record and gave it to him and said listen to this, I think you could do something with a couple of these tracks. When I joined the band, Manfred was fiddling around with "Blinded by the Light" and I never had heard Springsteen's version until I went and saw him live in 1977 in Montreal. So Manfred just sang me the song and said this is how it goes. I didn't want to listen to the original and be swayed by it in any way. So I never heard it at all, we just sat around a piano and Manfred said this is the way it goes. Then we worked it out with the band and the rest is history.

— Chris Thompson interview – Keys and Chords

=== Charts ===
==== Weekly charts ====
Chart (1976–1977)	Peak position
Australian Albums (Kent Music Report)	11
Belgium (Ultratop 50 Wallonia)	44
Canada Top Singles (RPM)	1
Netherlands (Single Top 100)	19
New Zealand (Recorded Music NZ)	8
UK Singles (Official Charts)	6
US Billboard Hot 100	1
US Cash Box Top 100	1
West Germany (GfK)	42

==== Year-end charts ====
Chart (1976)	Peak position
Australian Albums (Kent Music Report)	88

Chart (1977)	Peak position
Canada Top Singles (RPM)	28
US Billboard Hot 100	36
US Cash Box Top 100	52

=== Certifications ===
Region	Certification	Certified units/sales
United Kingdom (BPI)	Silver	200,000^{‡}
United States (RIAA)	Gold	1,000,000^{^}
^{^} Shipments figures based on certification alone.^{‡} Sales+streaming figures based on certification alone.

=== Personnel ===
- Manfred Mann – organ, piano, Minimoog, backing vocals, lead vocals
- Chris Hamlet Thompson – lead vocals, rhythm guitar
- Dave Flett – lead guitar
- Colin Pattenden – bass
- Chris Slade – drums, backing vocals

with

- Doreen Chanter – backing vocals
- Irene Chanter – backing vocals
- Susanne Lynch – backing vocals

=== 2007 remix ===
In 2007, Manfred Mann's Earth Band's version was remixed by German duo Michael Mind that reached No. 6 in Finland and No. 12 in Germany.

== See also ==
- Blinded by the Light (2019 film) – a 2019 British comedy-drama about an aspiring writer inspired by Bruce Springsteen songs
