= Greetings from Asbury Park, N.J. =

Studio album by Bruce Springsteen
- Released: January 5, 1973
- Recorded: June 7 – October 26, 1972
- Studio: 914 Sound in Blauvelt, New York
- Genre: Rock
- Length: 37:08
- Label: Columbia
- Producers: Mike Appel; Jim Cretecos

Bruce Springsteen chronology
Greetings from Asbury Park, N.J. (1973)	The Wild, the Innocent & the E Street Shuffle (1973)

Bruce Springsteen and the E Street Band chronology
Greetings from Asbury Park, N.J. (1973)	The Wild, the Innocent & the E Street Shuffle (1973)

Singles from Greetings from Asbury Park, N.J.
- 1. "Blinded by the Light" Released: February 1973; 2. "Spirit in the Night" Released: May 1973

Greetings from Asbury Park, N.J. is the debut studio album by the American singer-songwriter Bruce Springsteen. It was produced from June 7 to October 26, 1972, by Mike Appel and Jim Cretecos at the budget-priced 914 Sound Studios, based in Blauvelt, New York. The album was released on January 5, 1973, through Columbia Records, to average sales but a positive critical reception. The tracks "Blinded by the Light" and "Spirit in the Night" were released as the project's two singles, in February and May 1973 respectively, although both singles failed to chart.

Greetings from Asbury Park, N.J. first charted in the United Kingdom on June 15, 1985, in the wake of Springsteen's Born in the U.S.A. tour arriving in Britain; it remained in the top 100 for ten weeks. In 2003, the album was ranked at No. 379 in Rolling Stone's "500 Greatest Albums of All Time" list and in 2013 the same magazine listed Greetings from Asbury Park, N.J. as one of the "100 Greatest Debut Albums of All Time". On November 22, 2009, the album was played in its entirety for the first time by Bruce Springsteen and the E Street Band, at the HSBC Arena in Buffalo, New York, to celebrate the last show of the Working on a Dream tour.

== Recording ==
Springsteen and his first manager Mike Appel recorded the album at the low-priced, out-of-the-way 914 Sound Studios to save as much as possible of the Columbia Records advance, and cut most of the songs during the last week of June 1972. There was a dispute not long after the record was recorded—Appel and John Hammond preferred the solo tracks, while Springsteen preferred the band songs. As such, a compromise was reached—the album was to feature five songs with the band ("For You", "Growin' Up", "Does This Bus Stop at 82nd Street?", "It's Hard to be a Saint in the City", and "Lost in the Flood") and five solo songs ("Mary Queen of Arkansas", "The Angel", "Jazz Musician", "Arabian Nights" and "Visitation at Fort Horn").

However, when Columbia Records president Clive Davis heard the album submitted on August 10, 1972, he felt that it lacked a potential hit single, and rejected it. Springsteen quickly wrote "Blinded by the Light" and "Spirit in the Night", and recorded both on September 11, 1972. Because pianist David Sancious and bassist Garry Tallent were unavailable, a four-man band was used—Vini Lopez on drums, Harold Wheeler on piano, Springsteen on guitar, piano (on "Spirit in the Night" only), and bass, and the previously missing Clarence Clemons on saxophone. Columbia accepted the revised album, and Davis was personally pleased with Springsteen's response.

== Critical reception ==
Professional ratings
Review scores
Source	Rating
AllMusic	5/5 stars
Chicago Tribune	2.5/4 stars
Christgau's Record Guide	B+
Creem	B
Encyclopedia of Popular Music	4/5 stars
MusicHound Rock	2.5/5
New Musical Express	6/10
Q	3/5 stars
The Rolling Stone Album Guide	3/5 stars
Tom Hull – on the Web	B

Reviewing for Rolling Stone in July 1973, Lester Bangs hailed Springsteen as a daring new artist who sets himself apart from his contemporaries with songwriting that either has a serious meaning or showcases his uninhibited gift for verbose, overloaded lyrics and rhyme schemes. "Some of [his words] can mean something socially or otherwise", Bangs said, "but there's plenty of 'em that don't even pretend to, reveling in the joy of utter crass showoff talent run amuck and totally out of control". Peter Knobler wrote in Crawdaddy that "he sings with a freshness and urgency I haven't heard since I was rocked by 'Like a Rolling Stone' ... the album rocks, then glides, then rocks again. There is the combined sensibility of the chaser and the chaste, the street punk and the bookworm." Creem magazine's Robert Christgau said Springsteen's songs are dominated by the kind of mannered emotional transparency and "absurdist energy" that made Bob Dylan "a genius instead of a talent". In Christgau's Record Guide (1981), he wrote that despite the grandiloquent, unaccompanied "Mary Queen of Arkansas" and "The Angel", songs such as "Blinded by the Light" and "Growin' Up" foreshadow Springsteen's "unguarded teen-underclass poetry", while even the maundering "Lost in the Flood" is interesting.

In All Music Guide to Rock (2002), William Ruhlmann gave Greetings from Asbury Park, N.J. five stars and said that it combined the mid-1960s folk rock music of Bob Dylan, accessible melodies, and elaborate arrangements and lyrics: "Asbury Park painted a portrait of teenagers cocksure of themselves, yet bowled over by their discovery of the world. It was saved from pretentiousness (if not preciousness) by its sense of humor and by the careful eye for detail ... that kept even the most high-flown language rooted." In 2003, the album was ranked number 379 on Rolling Stone's list of the 500 greatest albums of all time. They ranked it 37th on their list of greatest debut albums.

== Track listing ==
All tracks are written by Bruce Springsteen.

Side one
No.	Title	Length
1.	"Blinded by the Light"	5:06
2.	"Growin' Up"	3:05
3.	"Mary Queen of Arkansas"	5:21
4.	"Does This Bus Stop at 82nd Street?"	2:05
5.	"Lost in the Flood"	5:17

Side two
No.	Title	Length
1.	"The Angel"	3:24
2.	"For You"	4:40
3.	"Spirit in the Night"	5:00
4.	"It's Hard to Be a Saint in the City"	3:13
Total length:		37:08

== Personnel ==
- Bruce Springsteen – lead vocals, backing vocals, acoustic guitar, electric guitar, harmonica, congas, handclaps, bass guitar on “Blinded by the Light” and “Spirit in the Night”, piano on “Spirit in the Night”

The E Street Band

- Clarence Clemons – saxophone, backing vocals, handclaps
- Vini "Mad Dog" Lopez – drums, backing vocals, handclaps
- David Sancious – piano, organ
- Garry Tallent – bass guitar

Additional musicians

- Richard Davis – double bass on "The Angel"
- Harold Wheeler – piano on "Blinded by the Light" and "Spirit in the Night"

Technical

- Mike Appel – producer
- Jim Cretecos – producer
- Louis Lahav – engineer
- Jack Ashkinazy – remixing
- John Berg – cover design
- Fred Lombardi – back cover design
- Steven Van Zandt reportedly provided sound effects on "Lost in the Flood", although Van Zandt denied having any involvement on his official Twitter page.

== Charts ==
Chart (1975)	Peak position
US Billboard 200	60

Chart (1985)	Peak position
Australian Albums (Kent Music Report)	71
Swedish Albums (Sverigetopplistan)	35
UK Albums (Official Charts)	41

Chart (2025)	Peak position
Greek Albums (IFPI)	42

== Certifications and sales ==
Region	Certification	Certified units/sales
Australia (ARIA)	Gold	35,000^{^}
France	—	8,000
Germany	—	100,000
United Kingdom (BPI)	Silver	60,000^{^}
United States (RIAA)	2× Platinum	2,000,000^{^}
^{^} Shipments figures based on certification alone.

== See also ==
- 1973 in music
- Asbury Park, New Jersey
- Greetings from Cairo, Illinois – a 2005 album from Stace England about Cairo, Illinois with a cover mimicking Greetings from Asbury Park, N.J.
- Greetings from... Jake – a 2019 album from Jake Owen with a cover mimicking Greetings from Asbury Park, N.J.
