= Spirit in the Night =

1973 single by Bruce Springsteen

Single by Bruce Springsteen

from the album Greetings from Asbury Park, N.J.
- B-side: "For You"
- Released: May 1973
- Recorded: September 11, 1972 with final dubs and mixing October 26, 1972
- Studio: 914 Sound Studios, Blauvelt, New York
- Genre: Rock; gospel
- Length: 5:00
- Label: Columbia
- Songwriter: Bruce Springsteen
- Producers: Mike Appel; Jim Cretecos

Bruce Springsteen singles chronology
"Blinded by the Light" (1973)	"Spirit in the Night" (1973)	"Born to Run" (1975)

Greetings from Asbury Park, N.J. track listing
- 9 tracks: 1. "Blinded by the Light"; 2. "Growin' Up"; 3. "Mary Queen of Arkansas"; 4. "Does This Bus Stop at 82nd Street?"; 5. "Lost in the Flood"; Side two: 1. "The Angel"; 2. "For You"; 3. "Spirit in the Night"; 4. "It's Hard to Be a Saint in the City"

"Spirit in the Night" is a song written and originally recorded by American singer-songwriter Bruce Springsteen for his debut album Greetings from Asbury Park, N.J. (1973). It was also the second single released from the album. A cover version performed by Manfred Mann's Earth Band using the title "Spirits in the Night" was released on the album Nightingales and Bombers and as a Top 40 single.

== Original version ==
The original version of "Spirit in the Night" was released on Bruce Springsteen's debut album, Greetings from Asbury Park, N.J. It was one of the last songs to be written and recorded. Springsteen and producer Mike Appel submitted the finished album to Columbia Records on August 10, 1972, but Clive Davis, president of the record label, was concerned that none of the tracks had the commercial appeal required to be released as a single. Springsteen quickly wrote, and on September 11 recorded, two additional songs, "Spirit in the Night" and "Blinded by the Light". Since recording sessions had been completed in late June, most of the band members had since become engaged elsewhere. As a result, the lineup for "Spirit in the Night" was limited to Vini Lopez on drums, and Springsteen on all other instruments, but featured the addition of Clarence Clemons on saxophone, adding a new dimension to the music.

Although most of the songs on Greetings from Asbury Park, N.J. were packed with lyrics to the extent that sometimes they overwhelm the musical arrangements, "Spirit in the Night" has been described as the one song on the album on which the music and narrative fit together. Clemons' sax playing and Lopez' drumming match the freedom and ebullience described in the lyrics. The lyrics themselves describe a group of teenagers—Wild Billy, Hazy Davy, Crazy Janey, Killer Joe, G-Man and Mission Man, who is the person in the song telling the story—going to a spot called "Greasy Lake" near "Route 88" for a night of freedom, sex, and drinking. But although their escape to the freedom of Greasy Lake is short lived, the emphasis is on the friends' togetherness. The lyrics of the song echo the Crazy Jane poems of Irish poet William Butler Yeats.

=== Live performances ===
Although the release of the song as a single was unsuccessful, "Spirit in the Night" was a favorite at Springsteen concerts into the 1980s. Live versions of the song have appeared on the 3-CD compilation Live/1975–85 and on both the CD and video versions of Hammersmith Odeon London '75, released in 2006. A version with Springsteen playing the song solo on piano appears on the 2003 DVD Live in Barcelona. This version is memorable as Springsteen has to start the third verse over again after playing the wrong chords on piano. The studio version of the song was released on the compilation album The Essential Bruce Springsteen in 2003.

With 572 live performances as of May 2020, "Spirit in the Night" is, behind "Growin' Up", by far the most frequently played song from Greetings from Asbury Park, N.J. The song live involves important crowd participation, with the audience singing the "all night" verse during the chorus while Springsteen interacts very closely with the front rows, sometimes even throwing himself into the pit. In the 1970s, the twenty-something Springsteen usually played "Spirits" third, and nightly ventured out into the audience, sometimes with Clarence Clemons in tow.

=== Personnel ===
Personnel according to Greetings from Asbury Park, N.J. liner notes, authors Philippe Margotin and Jean-Michel Guesdon:

- Bruce Springsteen – vocals, bass, piano, congas, handclaps, organ (?)
- Vini "Mad Dog" Lopez – drums, handclaps
- Clarence Clemons – saxophone, backing vocals, handclaps
- Harold Wheeler – piano

== Manfred Mann's Earth Band version ==
"Spirits in the Night"

Single by Manfred Mann's Earth Band

from the album Nightingales & Bombers
- B-side: "As Above So Below Part 2"
- Released: July 18, 1975
- Recorded: 1975
- Studio: The Workhouse, London
- Genre: Progressive rock
- Length: 6:27 (album version); 3:15 (single edit)
- Label: Bronze
- Songwriter: Bruce Springsteen
- Producers: Manfred Mann and the Earth Band

Manfred Mann's Earth Band singles chronology
"Be Not Too Hard" (1974)	"Spirits in the Night" (1975)	"Blinded by the Light" (1976)

Manfred Mann's Earth Band covered "Spirit in the Night" for their album Nightingales and Bombers, with the title "Spirits in the Night" on the European album and single releases, but "Spirit in the Night" on the U.S. and Canadian albums and singles. The Manfred Mann version differs from Springsteen's version mostly in its arrangement, relying heavily on keyboards and using different harmonies in the chorus. Billboard compared Manfred Mann's treatment to ELO. Cash Box said that it has "a more r&b-oriented formula than the original version while retaining a faithful recreation of the setting, a party in the night away from the city." Record World said that "the dynamics added to the Bruce Springsteen tune turns the song into an aggressive hard rocker." The album version, featuring Mick Rogers on vocals, peaked at number 97 on the Billboard Hot 100 in 1976. The following year, Manfred Mann's Earth Band again released the song as a single with the titles "Spirit in the Night" (U.S. and Australia) and "Spirits in the Night" (other parts of the world), this time with vocals by Chris Thompson. That version reached Billboard's Top 40, peaking at number 40. It only managed to reach number 59 on Cash Box. In Canada it reached #64. This version was released as a bonus track on the 2004 CD release of The Roaring Silence. Also available on 'blue' Roaring Silence LP in the 1970s. "Spirit in the Night" was to be the first of three songs from the Greetings from Asbury Park, N.J. album that Manfred Mann would cover—the others being their number-one hit "Blinded by the Light" and "For You".

=== Charts ===
Chart (1975)	Peak position
Netherlands (Single Top 100)	10
US Billboard Hot 100	97

== Greasy Lake ==
Greasy Lake, where the action takes place, may be a mythical place. Former E Street Band drummer Vini Lopez has stated that it is actually a composite of two locations that band members used to visit. One was Lake Carasaljo, near the intersection of U.S. Route 9 and New Jersey Route 88 in Lakewood, New Jersey. The other was an unnamed swampy lake near Garden State Parkway exit 88. However, "greasers" is the local slang term for the homeless, used by Springsteen in the second verse of another favorite, "4th of July, Asbury Park (Sandy), and "Greasy Lake", other locals insist, was near Howell, New Jersey, where people bathed and washed dishes. These homeless people were referred to as "Gypsy Angels" or "Spirits in the Night".

The Greasy Lake in the song inspired a short story named "Greasy Lake" by T. C. Boyle. Like Springsteen's characters, Boyle's characters are restless and looking to party, although they have a more dangerous edge than Springsteen's.
