= Conrad Hoffmann Jr. =

American missionary

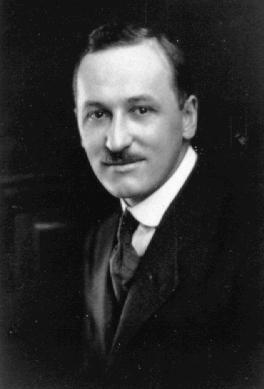
Conrad Hoffmann Jr. ca. 1915

Conrad Hoffmann Jr. (September 16, 1884 – August 12, 1958) was an American Christian missionary who aided war prisoners, European university students, and war refugees during both World Wars.

Hoffmann was born in Chicago, on September 16, 1884. He graduated from the University of Wisconsin in 1906, and received a PhD. from the same institution in 1910. He married Louise R. Bischoff in 1911, and they had one daughter and two sons.

Long affiliated with John R. Mott and the American YMCA, Hoffmann served as the Senior Secretary of the War Prisoners’ Aid in Germany from 1915 to 1919. While in Germany, he also served as a member of the German National Committee and coordinated the relief efforts of the International Red Cross, under the direction of Princess Margaret of Connaught, the Crown Princess of Sweden.

Hoffmann acquired camp visitation privileges, allowing him to interact directly with prisoners. He remained in Berlin after the United States broke diplomatic relations in February 1917, to ensure the continuation of reciprocal prisoner-of-war work. Despite the political upheavals in Germany, Hoffmann continued to work until his departure in June 1919.

After World War I, he accompanied the repatriation of Russian prisoners, working with the League of Nations and Fridtjof Nansen, the League's High Commissioner for Refugees. In 1920, he became the Executive Secretary of the European Student Relief under the auspices of the World Student Christian Federation (WSCF) in Geneva, Switzerland . He raised funds for needy university students in Soviet Russia and eighteen other countries. In 1922, he received an honorary degree from University of Graz, Austria, for his efforts as the Executive Director of the European Student Relief. In 1926, University of Tübingen in Germany granted him an honorary Ph.D. in Economics, in recognition of his work on behalf of university students.

Hoffmann recognized the increase in anti-Semitism and turned his attention to promoting better understanding between Christians and Jews. In 1930, the International Missionary Council appointed him head of its committee on the Christian Approach to the Jews. In 1936, the Board of National Missions of the Presbyterian Church appointed him Secretary-in-Charge of Jewish Work.

During World War II, he worked with German POWs and the YMCA's War Prisoners' Aid of Canada. Following the war, he helped relocate hundreds of refugees to the United States.

Hoffmann died in Blauvelt, New York on August 12, 1958.
