= Marie Castello =

Fortuneteller (1915–2008)

- Born: May 25, 1915
- Died: June 27, 2008 (aged 93)
- Other name: Madam Marie
- Occupation: Fortune Teller

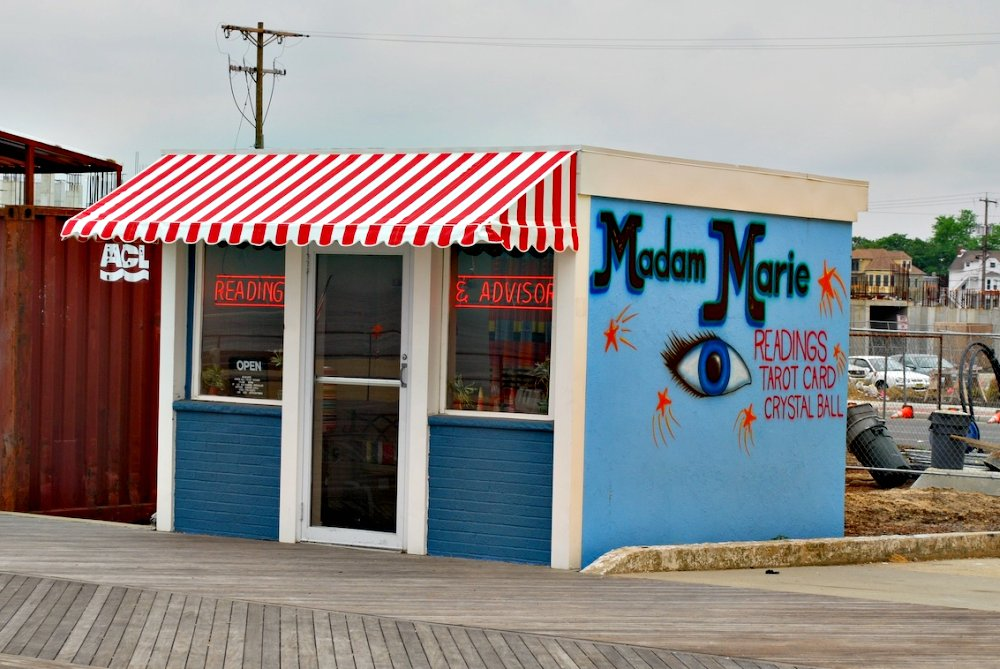
Madam Marie's Stand at boardwalk in Asbury Park, New Jersey (2008)

Marie Castello (May 25, 1915 – June 27, 2008), who was known as Madam Marie, was an American fortune teller and psychic reader who worked on the Asbury Park, New Jersey, boardwalk from 1932 until 2008. Madam Marie was the longest running tenant on the Asbury Park boardwalk.

Castello was a fixture in Asbury Park for decades, telling fortunes on and off at her tiny booth on the boardwalk which is nicknamed The Temple of Knowledge. She read the fortunes of celebrities ranging from Judy Garland to Bruce Springsteen. Castello reportedly told Springsteen that he would be a huge success. Springsteen later said that she told all her musician clients the same thing.

Springsteen mentioned Castello in his 1973 song "4th of July, Asbury Park (Sandy)", which earned her a certain amount of fame among his fans. Springsteen wrote in the song's lyrics of Castello: "Did you hear the cops finally busted Madam Marie for tellin' fortunes better than they do." Castello was cited in 1967 for telling fortunes, at the time a violation of the New Jersey disorderly conduct statute, and fined $50. Castello was never arrested during her career, according to Asbury Park deputy mayor Jim Bruno. Bruno added that "Springsteen turned her into an icon." Additionally, in Springsteen's 1987 single "Brilliant Disguise", a song about his failing first marriage, he sings, "As we stood at the altar the gypsy swore our future was bright, but come the wee-wee hours maybe baby the gypsy lied". Springsteen reportedly never forgot Madam Marie and often visited her when he was back in Asbury Park. "He always comes by to say hello...He knows where he came from," Castello told the Asbury Park Press in a May 2008 interview with reporter Bill Handleman.

== Life and career ==
=== Personal life ===
Marie Castello was born in Neptune City, New Jersey, on May 25, 1915. Her Irish father made a living building "things" (in an exact quote from Castello), including pots, hand fans and baskets. Her mother was from Canada, and her maternal grandfather was originally from Australia. "Quite a combination, ain't it?" said Castello in a May 2008 interview while referring to her ethnic heritage.

Castello and her husband, Walter Castello, a car salesman, were married for over seventy years. The Castellos, who "married young," had four children and fourteen grandchildren. Walter Castello died in the late 1990s. Castello claimed that her family surname Castello was the name given to her late husband's grandfather by American immigration officials when he passed through New York's Ellis Island from the Russian Empire during the 19th century. Castello was not sure what her family's name originally was.

=== Madam Marie ===
Madam Marie began telling fortunes at her small, twelve foot square booth called the Temple of Knowledge in 1932. She, and her small stand, would remain a popular Asbury Park fixture on the city's boardwalk for much of the next seven decades. According to Castello, when she opened her business in the 1930s the Asbury Park boardwalk was a much more formal place than it became in later decades, "You couldn't walk on the boardwalk without shoes. You couldn't go on the boardwalk in a bathing suit. And there was never any drinking." At the time, many of her customers wore dresses, evening gowns and tuxedos to walk the boardwalk.

During the 1960s, Madam Marie became popularly known as "the gypsy queen of the boardwalk." Castello did not know why people began calling her gypsy, but reportedly did not mind the nickname as she felt that mystery was good for a fortunetelling business. The nickname became especially popular with locals, especially teens who worked in the area, such as a young Bruce Springsteen. Springsteen began visiting Madam Marie, as Castello was known on the boardwalk, around the age of 17, and often played his guitar outside of her booth. According to stories told by Springsteen, Castello predicted that he would be famous. She would later be immortalized in his 1973 song, "4th of July, Asbury Park (Sandy)".

Castello gained a following among celebrities who often stopped at Asbury Park to perform at the nearby Asbury Park Convention Hall during her long career on the boardwalk, especially during the 1960s. Her famous clients included Ray Charles, Woody Allen, Perry Como, Diane Keaton, Elton John, The Rolling Stones, Elliott Gould, Gorilla Monsoon, Vic Damone and Diahann Carroll.

Castello continued to work on the boardwalk despite the decline of Asbury Park during the 1970s. She became one of the few businesses that remained on the boardwalk during the 1970s and 1980s as tourism in Asbury Park declined. She did not talk about the decline of Asbury Park during the 1970s stating, "It's something I want to forget," in a May 2008 interview.

Castello closed down her regular daily business on the boardwalk in 1997, which coincided with a decline in business in Asbury Park. She continued to read fortunes in nearby Ocean Township, New Jersey.

=== Return to Asbury Park ===
Madam Marie returned to fortunetelling at her Temple of Knowledge in Asbury Park on July 4, 2004, after a seven-year hiatus from the boardwalk, her longest absence since the 1930s. Her return coincided with renewed investment and a boom in new businesses in Asbury Park. She resumed giving fortune readings to customers on weekends only, charging between $5 and $35 for her predictions. Other family members worked the stand at other times, including her granddaughter, Sabrina.

Castello continued to work as a fortuneteller at her booth in Asbury Park until she died in 2008. She suffered from arthritis during her later years, which sometimes kept her away from her business. However, she remained mentally sharp throughout her life.

=== Death ===
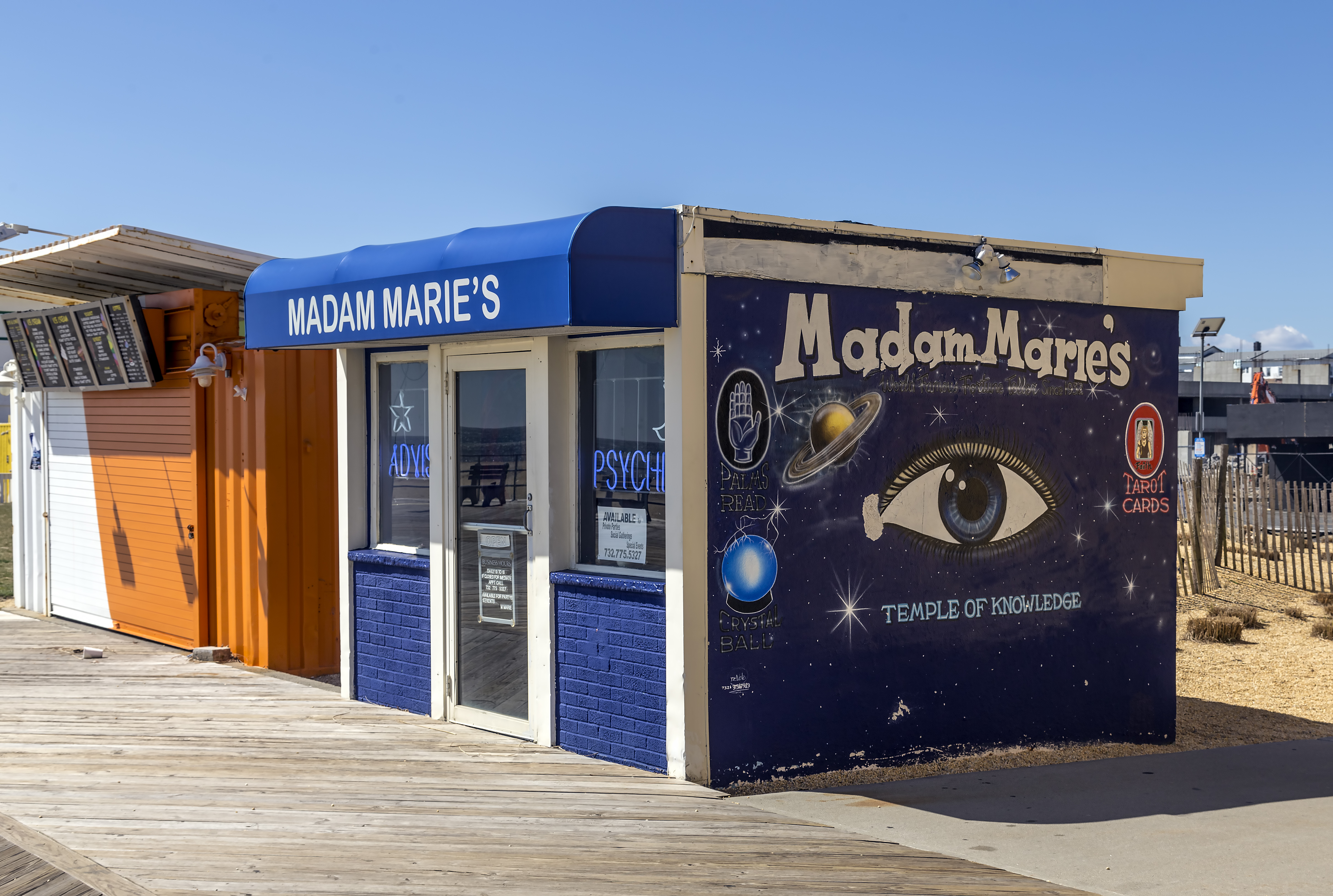
Madam Marie's in 2016

Marie Castello died unexpectedly on June 27, 2008, at the age of 93. According to Castello's great-granddaughter Sally Castello, "She really wasn't sick. She just wasn't feeling well. She was very, very strong until the day she died." The American flag at the Convention Hall-Paramount Theatre in Asbury Park was lowered to half staff in her honor.

Bruce Springsteen dedicated the July 4, 2008, performance of "4th of July, Asbury Park (Sandy)" in Gothenburg to Castello and subsequently issued memories and condolences on his website:

Back in the day when I was a fixture on the Asbury Park boardwalk, I'd often stop and talk to Madam Marie as she sat on her folding chair outside the Temple of Knowledge. I'd sit across from her on the metal guard rail bordering the beach, and watched as she led the day trippers into the small back room where she would unlock a few of the mysteries of their future. She always told me mine looked pretty good — she was right. The world has lost enough mystery as it is — we need our fortunetellers. We send our condolences out to her family who've carried on her tradition. Over here on E Street, we will miss her.

Castello's family continues to give readings from Castello's booth on the Asbury Park boardwalk.
