= The Wild, the Innocent & the E Street Shuffle =

Studio album by Bruce Springsteen
- Released: November 5, 1973
- Recorded: May 14 – September 23, 1973
- Studio: 914 Sound Studios, Blauvelt, New York
- Genre: Rock
- Length: 46:43
- Label: Columbia
- Producer: Mike Appel; Jim Cretecos

Bruce Springsteen chronology
Greetings from Asbury Park, N.J. (1973)	The Wild, the Innocent & the E Street Shuffle (1973)	Born to Run (1975)

Bruce Springsteen and the E Street Band chronology
Greetings from Asbury Park, N.J. (1973)	The Wild, the Innocent & the E Street Shuffle (1973)	Born to Run (1975)

Singles from The Wild, the Innocent & the E Street Shuffle
- 1. "4th of July, Asbury Park (Sandy)" Released: 1975 (Germany only); 2. "Rosalita (Come Out Tonight)" Released: 1979

The Wild, the Innocent & the E Street Shuffle is the second studio album by the American rock singer-songwriter Bruce Springsteen. It was recorded by Springsteen with the E Street Band at 914 Sound Studios in Blauvelt, New York, and released on November 5, 1973, through Columbia Records. It includes the song "Rosalita (Come Out Tonight)", the band's most-used set-closing song through 1985.

As with Springsteen's debut album released earlier in the year, Greetings from Asbury Park, N.J., The Wild, the Innocent & the E Street Shuffle was well-received critically but had little commercial success at the time. Locally, though, the album sold well, was played regularly on Northeast album-oriented rock stations and made Springsteen a local phenomenon. Once Springsteen achieved nationwide popularity with his subsequent album Born to Run (1975), several selections from this album became popular FM radio airplay and concert favorites. On November 7, 2009, Springsteen and the E Street Band played the album in its entirety for the first time during a concert at Madison Square Garden. In Rolling Stone's 2020 edition of its "The 500 Greatest Albums of All Time" list, the album was ranked at number 345.

== Recording ==
Recording began on May 14, 1973, with the day spent on "Circus Song", which would be finished on June 28, and re-titled "Wild Billy's Circus Story". Two days later, "The Fever" was recorded in one take, then discarded and not included on the album. Sessions did not resume until June 22, but all backing tracks and most of the album would be recorded by the end of the week. September 23, 1973, was the final day of sessions, with final touches applied to "Kitty's Back", the last verse of "4th of July, Asbury Park (Sandy)" overdubbed with new lyrics, "Rosalita (Come Out Tonight)" and a brand new song, "Incident on 57th Street", both recorded from scratch and completed. Along with these tracks, the album would be composed of "New York City Serenade", completed August 7, and "The E Street Shuffle", recorded on June 28 in one session.

== Musical style ==
According to biographer Peter Ames Carlin, Springsteen had developed a "renewed passion for full-band rock 'n' roll" with The Wild, the Innocent & the E Street Shuffle. Sputnikmusic critic Adam Thomas later wrote that the album departed from the folk influences of Springsteen's 1973 debut album Greetings from Asbury Park, N.J. and was instead characterized by "a grand fusion of nostalgic rock 'n' roll and soulful R&B".

== Artwork and name ==
The back photo for the album featured six members of Springsteen's backing E Street Band standing in a doorway of an antique store on Sairs Ave in the West End section of Long Branch, New Jersey. The building was across the street from West End Elementary School, and for years was Tommy Reed's bicycle repair shop and penny candy store; it has since been demolished and its former location is occupied by a parking lot.

The album was named in part after the 1959 Audie Murphy--Sandra Dee film, The Wild and the Innocent.

== Release ==
There is disagreement on The Wild, the Innocent & the E Street Shuffle's release date between official sources and third-party sources, including various Springsteen biographies covering the era. Springsteen's official website provides a release date of September 11, 1973; however, it is known that Springsteen was still in the studio recording for the album past this date. Indeed, September 23 was the final recording date, and after mixing and sequencing tweaks, the album was released on November 5, 1973. However, there was very little press, no advertisements in the trade papers and no release party, possibly because of Springsteen's deteriorating relationship with Columbia Records, and the departures of John Hammond and Clive Davis, the men who had signed him as a Columbia artist. This situation would continue, and would almost result in the termination of Springsteen's contract in 1974.

== Reception ==
Retrospective professional reviews
Review scores
Source	Rating
AllMusic	5/5 stars
Chicago Tribune	3/4 stars
Christgau's Record Guide	A−
Encyclopedia of Popular Music	4/5 stars
Goldmine	5/5 stars
MusicHound Rock	4/5
Q	4/5 stars
The Rolling Stone Album Guide	5/5 stars
Sputnikmusic	4.5/5
Tom Hull – on the Web	B

The Wild, the Innocent & the E Street Shuffle sold poorly when it was first released in 1973 but received acclaim from critics. Rolling Stone magazine's Ken Emerson said that its lengthy, vividly written songs make for a more challenging and romantic album than Greetings from Asbury Park, N.J., but still retain that album's ebullient music because of Springsteen and the E Street Band's masterful playing. In a less enthusiastic review for Creem, Robert Christgau wrote that it does not cohere as a whole, although its livelier songs make it "the kind of album that will be fun to go back to" if Springsteen improves upon it. According to him in Christgau's Record Guide: Rock Albums of the Seventies (1981), Springsteen eschewed the limiting folk conventions of his first album for a vibrant, quirky style of rock and roll that balances his celebrations of wild youth with a mature embrace of city life: "This guy may not be God yet, but he has his sleeveless undershirt in the ring."

The Wild, the Innocent and the E Street Shuffle made its first appearance on the British albums chart on June 15, 1985. In the wake of Springsteen's Born in the U.S.A. Tour arriving in Britain, the record hit number 33 and remained in the Top 100 for 12 weeks. The Rolling Stone Album Guide (1992) later called the album a "masterpiece", "cinematic in its sweep" and densely poetic with "vignettes of urban dreams and adolescent restlessness". Goldmine magazine's Rush Evans said it was not only a five-star album but also Springsteen's "most overlooked album ... to those who know its seven richly vivid songs, it is recognized as an innovative masterpiece." Reviewing it for AllMusic, William Ruhlmann felt the record epitomized Springsteen's romanticized songwriting and diversity as a composer, making it his best work and "one of the greatest albums in the history of rock & roll". In 2003, Rolling Stone ranked the record at number 132 on the magazine's list of the 500 greatest albums of all time, and 133 in a 2012 revised list. Writing in Hot Press, Pat Carty declared "if I want to beam like an idiot and remember why I fell in love with music in the first place, this is the Springsteen record I put on". Chicago Tribune critic Greg Kot was less enthusiastic and remarked only on how the record was highlighted by the beautiful three-song suite that ended it.

== Rejected songs ==
On November 4 and 5, 1997, eight tracks not included on The Wild, the Innocent and the E Street Shuffle were mixed and evaluated for inclusion on the Tracks box set, to be released in 1998. They included "Zero and Blind Terry", "Thundercrack", "Seaside Bar Song", "Santa Ana", "Bishop Danced", "Evacuation of the West" aka "No More Kings In Texas", "Phantoms" and "Fire on the Wing". The first five, which included a live version of "Bishop Danced", recorded on January 31, 1973, at Max's Kansas City, New York City, were included; "Phantoms", "Fire on the Wing" and "No More Kings/Evacuation" remain officially unreleased.

"The Fever", recorded in a single take on May 16, 1973, was also rejected and disliked by Springsteen. His manager at the time, Mike Appel, without informing Springsteen or Columbia Records, sent a cassette of the song to approximately forty disc jockeys across the US, including Ed Sciaky in Philadelphia, Kid Leo in Cleveland, and other DJs in Boston, New York, Houston, and Dallas. The song was then included on an endless stream of bootlegs, and was well known to Springsteen fans as one of his best songs. When it failed to appear on Tracks, along with "The Promise", another highly regarded unreleased song, a backlash occurred among fans on the Internet. In response, a second release, 18 Tracks, was hastily assembled and released on April 13, 1999, with both songs included.

== Track listing ==
All tracks are written by Bruce Springsteen.

Side one
No.	Title	Length
1.	"The E Street Shuffle"	4:31
2.	"4th of July, Asbury Park (Sandy)"	5:36
3.	"Kitty's Back"	7:09
4.	"Wild Billy's Circus Story"	4:47

Side two
No.	Title	Length
1.	"Incident on 57th Street"	7:45
2.	"Rosalita (Come Out Tonight)"	7:00
3.	"New York City Serenade"	9:55
Total length:		46:43

== Personnel ==
- Bruce Springsteen – lead vocals (all tracks), guitar (all tracks), maracas (track 1), recorder (track 2), harmonica (track 4), mandolin (track 4)

The E Street Band

- Clarence Clemons – tenor saxophone (tracks 1, 2, 3, 6, 7), backing vocals (tracks 1, 2, 3, 6, 7)
- Danny Federici – backing vocals (tracks 1, 2, 4, 6, 7), accordion (tracks 2, 4), organ (track 3), second piano (track 5)
- Garry Tallent – bass guitar (all tracks except 4), tuba (tracks 1, 4), backing vocals (track 3)
- David Sancious – piano (all tracks except 1, 4), organ, clavinet (track 1), soprano saxophone (track 1), electric piano (track 1), backing vocals (track 7), organ solo (track 3), Mellotron (track 7), string arrangement (track 7)
- "Mad Dog" Vini Lopez – drums, percussion (all tracks), backing vocals (tracks 1, 3, 7), cornet (track 1)

Additional personnel

- Richard Blackwell – percussion (tracks 1, 7)
- Albany "Al" Tellone – baritone saxophone (track 1)
- Suki Lahav – choir vocals (tracks 2, 5)

Technical

- Mike Appel & Jim Cretecos – record producers (for Laurel Canyon Ltd.)
- Louis Lahav – engineer
- Teresa Alfieri & John Berg – design
- David Gahr – photography

== Charts ==
Chart (1975)	Peak position
US Billboard Top LPs & Tape	59

Chart (1985)	Peak position
Australian Albums (Kent Music Report)	60
Swedish Albums (Sverigetopplistan)	34
UK Albums (OCC)	33

== Certifications and sales ==
Region	Certification	Certified units/sales
Australia (ARIA)	Gold	35,000^{^}
Germany	—	100,000
United Kingdom (BPI)	Silver	60,000^{^}
United States (RIAA)	2× Platinum	2,000,000^{^}
^{^} Shipments figures based on certification alone.
