= Tracks (Bruce Springsteen album) =

Box set by Bruce Springsteen
- Released: November 10, 1998
- Recorded: May 3, 1972 – August 24, 1998
- Genre: Rock
- Length: 254:58
- Label: Columbia
- Producer: Various

Bruce Springsteen chronology
Blood Brothers (1996)	Tracks (1998)	18 Tracks (1999)

Bruce Springsteen and the E Street Band chronology
Blood Brothers (1996)	Tracks (1998)	18 Tracks (1999)

Singles from Tracks
- 1. "I Wanna Be with You" Released: May 8, 1999; 2. "Sad Eyes" Released: June 8, 1999

Professional ratings
Review scores
Source	Rating
Tom Hull	B+
AllMusic	4/5 stars

Tracks is a four-disc box set by the American singer-songwriter Bruce Springsteen, released in 1998 containing 66 songs. This box set mostly consists of never-before-released songs recorded during the sessions for his many albums, but also includes a number of single B-sides, as well as demos and alternate versions of already-released material.

== History ==
The project began in February 1998, when Springsteen and his chief recording engineer, Toby Scott, began going through his massive collection of unreleased songs. Springsteen had been known as a very prolific songwriter (Darkness on the Edge of Town, The River, and Born in the U.S.A. each had more than 50 songs written for them), and by 1998 the number of unreleased songs was up to more than 350— 3/4 of all his recorded material. Scott had begun on a computerized database of Springsteen's archives in 1985 in order to allow Springsteen to find specific songs that hadn't been released yet, and it was understood by Scott and others since the 1980s that Springsteen would eventually compile a selection of these unreleased recordings into a box set.

Springsteen, engineer Chuck Plotkin and manager Jon Landau had considered releasing these songs in their current rough-mix form, going as far as mastering them in a test-run to get an idea of what they would sound like, but following a listening session in June, it was decided to mix them properly from the original multi-track tapes. Around this time, Sony Music was alerted that the project was in-progress, and they created their own timetable for promotion and release with a September 10 deadline for the final submission of the master tapes. According to Scott, they hadn't even completed a final list of songs by June, and the three-month schedule placed a lot of pressure on them to locate, remix and master the final track list in time to meet Sony's deadline.

Springsteen, Scott, and three sets of engineers spent the next three months going through Springsteen's massive song library, locating the multi-track reels with Scott's database, mixing songs and picking out the best of the unreleased material. Sometimes, a song would need extra parts added on, such as in the case of "Thundercrack", a song dating back to 1973. Springsteen called in then-former bandmates Danny Federici and Clarence Clemons, along with original drummer Vini Lopez, to fill in the missing pieces.

Though Springsteen already had a personal recording studio on his Jersey estate, the setup was awkward, using modest equipment in unconventional ways just to meet contemporary standards of professional recording. By the end of June, Scott was upgrading the facility into a far more sophisticated operation in order to meet the September deadline. Additionally, they began scheduling mix sessions across three different studios as the engineers' availability would be limited due to work with other clients. Springsteen's longtime engineer Bob Clearmountain would work remotely from Los Angeles, where he was already booked on other projects through August. Ed Thacker would mix at Springsteen's newly upgraded facility from July through September. Thom Panunzio would also mix at Springsteen's estate from the end of July through all of August, but he would work out of a mobile studio rented from the Record Plant as Thacker would be working out of Springsteen's studio at the same time. The material would also be divided up chronologically among the three engineers. For example, Panunzio would remix the earliest material as he had worked on many of those recordings when they were first made. Clearmountain mixed all of the material from the 1990s and Thacker mixed all of the material in-between as well as some of the earlier recordings. Up until early August, Scott would be coordinating the entire project by phone from his home in Whitefish, Montana, as he was expecting the birth of his first child, and engineer Greg Goldman would join the project as Scott's eyes and ears on the ground in Jersey where much of the team was located.

On a typical day in August, when all three engineers were working simultaneously, Panunzio and Thacker would generally set up a mix during the evening, returning the next morning to finish. Springsteen would call in during the afternoon and show up between 4 p.m. and 7 p.m. to listen to mixes and make any suggested changes. Plotkin would be present, adding his input, and he would also have his mixes played back in real time on a receiving unit set up in Springsteen's living room at the compound.

One of the most common changes between the new mixes and the vintage rough mixes was the difference in reverb. According to Thacker, Springsteen's vocals were originally "very big and sitting in the track surrounded by reverb," but Springsteen was now requesting him to "make the vocals drier than they might have been 20 years ago [and to] make them a little more personal."

By the end of June, they had a preliminary list of 128 songs selected for the box set, and the following July, they cut it down to 100 songs (six CDs worth). However, Springsteen eventually decided to cut the number to 66, leaving a total of four CDs. By then, Scott's wife had delivered and he was back on-site in Jersey. As the final mixes were approved, Scott loaded them on to a digital workstation and assembled them in sequence as they would appear in the final boxed set. This meant setting spacings, doing crossfades and other editing tasks that are often saved for the mastering stage if more time had permitted. These final sequences were outputted on to a hard drive and sent to Gateway Mastering in Portland, Maine where they were mastered in a week. After three days of listening tests, Scott, Plotkin and Springsteen signed off on the project and submitted the finished masters on schedule.

Even though the original intention was to cover material from all aspects of Springsteen's career, acoustic demos from 1972 (such as "Arabian Nights", "Jazz Musician", "Ballad of the Self-Loading Pistol", and "Visitation at Fort Horn") were not available for release, due to ongoing court proceedings surrounding the songs (concerning the attempted release of these songs by a different, European based label in 1993). Songs from the Electric Nebraska sessions, as well as songs from an unreleased 1994 album, were also missing.

== Song backgrounds ==
- "Roulette", "Be True", "Pink Cadillac", "Johnny Bye Bye", "Shut Out the Light", "Stand on It", "Janey Don't You Lose Heart", "Lucky Man", "Two for the Road", and "Part Man, Part Monkey" were all B-sides to singles. However, the take of "Stand on It" included on Tracks is a previously unknown alternate version that features an extra verse and a fully finished ending (as opposed to the fade-out on the original B-side).
- "Bishop Danced", "Santa Ana", "Seaside Bar Song", "Zero and Blind Terry", "Thundercrack", "Rendezvous", "So Young and in Love", "Man at the Top", "The Wish", "When the Lights Go Out", and "Brothers Under the Bridge" were all known from previous live performances.
- "Hearts of Stone" was previously recorded by Southside Johnny.
- A rerecorded "This Hard Land" was released on Greatest Hits, although the original recording did not appear until Tracks.
- "Linda Let Me Be the One", "Iceman", "Bring On the Night", "Don't Look Back", "Restless Nights", "Where the Bands Are", "Loose Ends", "Living on the Edge of the World", "Take 'Em as They Come", "Ricky Wants a Man of Her Own", "I Wanna Be with You", "Mary Lou", "Cynthia", "My Love Will Not Let You Down", "Frankie", "T.V. Movie", and "Back in Your Arms" had previously been unofficially released on bootlegs, sometimes under different titles.
- "A Good Man Is Hard to Find (Pittsburgh)" and "Lion's Den" were documented to exist, but had not been officially released.
- "Give the Girl a Kiss", "Dollhouse", "Wages of Sin", "Car Wash", "Rockaway the Days", "Brothers Under the Bridges ('83)", "When You Need Me", "The Honeymooners", "Leavin' Train", "Seven Angels", "Gave It a Name", "Sad Eyes", "My Lover Man", "Over the Rise", "Loose Change", "Trouble in Paradise", "Goin' Cali", and "Happy" were all unknown songs before Tracks.

== Reception, legacy, and follow-up ==
The box set was a minor success, peaking at #27 on the Billboard 200 album chart. It has been certified platinum in the U.S. and gold in Canada.

In a mostly positive review, AllMusic's music critic Stephen Thomas Erlewine opined that "If the end result isn't as revelatory as some may have expected (even the acoustic "Born in the U.S.A.," powerful as it is, doesn't sound any different than you may have imagined it), it's because Springsteen is, at heart, a solid craftsman, not a blinding visionary like Dylan. That's why Tracks is for the dedicated fan, where The Bootleg Series and The Basement Tapes are flat-out essential for rock fans."

Since its release, 44 of the songs on the set have been played live at least once, with "My Love Will Not Let You Down" receiving the most attention at over 100 plays.

The box set was later condensed into a single-disc album called 18 Tracks, with three songs ("Trouble River", "The Fever", and "The Promise") not on the 4-CD box set.

As a result of the project, Sony Music also created its own archive database, making extensive use of Scott's cataloging efforts over the previous decade.

In an interview with Rolling Stone in September 2020, Springsteen suggested that a follow-up box-set of unreleased material is in the works: "There's a lot of really good music left. You just go back there. It’s not that hard. If I pull out something from 1980, or 1985 or 1970, it's amazing how you can slip into that voice. It's just sort of headspace. All of those voices remain available to me, if I want to go to them," he told interviewer Brian Hiatt. Drummer Max Weinberg has overdubbed drum parts for over 40 songs since 2017 for potential inclusion in the next box-set and commented that "any other artist would kill to get these songs." Springsteen also hinted that he may release some "lost albums" in full from his vault, including "Electric Nebraska".

A follow-up to Tracks, Tracks II: The Lost Albums, was announced in April 2025, and released on June 27, 2025. The collection features seven full-length albums of unreleased material dating from 1983 to 2018, totaling 83 songs, 74 of which were previously unreleased.

== Track listing ==
All tracks are written by Bruce Springsteen, except where noted.

Disc one
No.	Title	Recording date and location	Length
1.	"Mary Queen of Arkansas" (Demo Version)	May 3, 1972; Columbia Records, 49 East 52nd Street, Studio E, New York, NY	4:27
2.	"It's Hard to Be a Saint in the City" (Demo Version)	May 3, 1972; Columbia Records, 49 East 52nd Street, Studio E, New York, NY	2:52
3.	"Growin' Up" (Demo Version)	May 3, 1972; Columbia Records, 49 East 52nd Street, Studio E, New York, NY	2:38
4.	"Does This Bus Stop at 82nd Street?" (Demo Version)	May 3, 1972; Columbia Records, 49 East 52nd Street, Studio E, New York, NY	1:58
5.	"Bishop Danced"	January 31, 1973; Recorded live at Max's Kansas City, NY	4:18
6.	"Santa Ana"	July 1, 1973; The Wild, the Innocent & the E Street Shuffle outtake	4:35
7.	"Seaside Bar Song"	July 24, 1973; The Wild, the Innocent & the E Street Shuffle outtake	3:33
8.	"Zero and Blind Terry"	August 7, 1973; The Wild, the Innocent & the E Street Shuffle outtake	5:56
9.	"Linda Let Me Be the One"	June 29, 1975 Born to Run outtake	4:24
10.	"Thundercrack"	August 9, 1973 + 1997; The Wild, the Innocent & the E Street Shuffle outtake	8:25
11.	"Rendezvous"	December 31, 1980; Recorded live at Nassau Coliseum, NY	2:48
12.	"Give the Girl a Kiss"	October 11, 1977; Darkness on the Edge of Town outtake	3:51
13.	"Iceman"	October 27, 1977; Darkness on the Edge of Town outtake	3:17
14.	"Bring On the Night"	June 13, 1979; The River outtake	2:36
15.	"So Young and In Love"	June 1, 1974; Born to Run outtake	3:47
16.	"Hearts of Stone"	October 14, 1977 + 1997 horns; Darkness on the Edge of Town outtake	4:29
17.	"Don't Look Back"	July 2, 1977; Darkness on the Edge of Town outtake	3:00

Disc two
No.	Title	Recording date and location	Length
1.	"Restless Nights"	May 2, 1980; The River outtake	3:44
2.	"A Good Man Is Hard to Find (Pittsburgh)"	May 6, 1982; Born in the U.S.A. outtake	3:15
3.	"Roulette"	April 12, 1980; The River outtake	3:51
4.	"Dollhouse"	August 21, 1979; The River outtake	3:31
5.	"Where the Bands Are"	October 9, 1979; The River outtake	3:43
6.	"Loose Ends"	July 18, 1979; The River outtake	4:00
7.	"Living on the Edge of the World"	December 3, 1979; The River outtake	4:17
8.	"Wages of Sin"	May 10, 1982; Born in the U.S.A. outtake	4:51
9.	"Take 'Em as They Come"	April 10, 1980; The River outtake	4:28
10.	"Be True"	July 18, 1979; The River outtake	3:39
11.	"Ricky Wants a Man of Her Own"	April 10, 1980; The River outtake	2:44
12.	"I Wanna Be with You"	May 31, 1979; The River outtake	3:21
13.	"Mary Lou"	July 13, 1979; The River outtake	3:21
14.	"Stolen Car" (alternate version)	September 24, 1979; The River outtake	4:26
15.	"Born in the U.S.A." (Demo Version)	January 3, 1982; Nebraska outtake	3:08
16.	"Johnny Bye-Bye" (writers: Chuck Berry, Springsteen)	January 4, 1983; Born in the U.S.A. outtake	1:49
17.	"Shut Out the Light"	January 19, 1983; Born in the U.S.A. outtake	3:51

Disc three
No.	Title	Recording date and location	Length
1.	"Cynthia"	June 15, 1983; Born in the U.S.A. outtake	4:13
2.	"My Love Will Not Let You Down"	May 5, 1982; Born in the U.S.A. outtake	4:28
3.	"This Hard Land"	May 11, 1982; Born in the U.S.A. outtake	4:46
4.	"Frankie"	May 14, 1982; Born in the U.S.A. outtake	7:22
5.	"TV Movie"	June 13, 1983; Born in the U.S.A. outtake	2:48
6.	"Stand on It" (alternative version)	June 16, 1983; Born in the U.S.A. outtake	3:05
7.	"Lion's Den"	January 25, 1982; Born in the U.S.A. outtake	2:18
8.	"Car Wash"	May 31, 1983; Born in the U.S.A. outtake	2:06
9.	"Rockaway the Days"	January 12, 1984; Born in the U.S.A. outtake	4:40
10.	"Brothers Under the Bridges '83"	September 14, 1983; Born in the U.S.A. outtake	5:06
11.	"Man at the Top"	January 12, 1984; Born in the U.S.A. outtake	3:19
12.	"Pink Cadillac"	May 31, 1983; Born in the U.S.A. outtake	3:33
13.	"Two for the Road"	February 1, 1987; Tunnel of Love outtake	1:57
14.	"Janey, Don't You Lose Heart"	June 16, 1983; Born in the U.S.A. outtake	3:24
15.	"When You Need Me"	January 20, 1987; Tunnel of Love outtake	2:54
16.	"The Wish"	February 22, 1987; Tunnel of Love outtake	5:14
17.	"The Honeymooners"	February 22, 1987; Tunnel of Love outtake	2:04
18.	"Lucky Man"	April 4, 1987; Tunnel of Love outtake	3:31

Disc four
No.	Title	Recording date and location	Length
1.	"Leavin' Train"	February 27, 1990; Human Touch outtake	4:05
2.	"Seven Angels"	June 29, 1990; Human Touch outtake	3:26
3.	"Gave It a Name"	August 24, 1998; Human Touch outtake, re-recorded for "Tracks"	2:47
4.	"Sad Eyes"	January 25, 1990; Human Touch outtake	3:47
5.	"My Lover Man"	December 4, 1990; Human Touch outtake	3:56
6.	"Over the Rise"	December 7, 1990; Human Touch outtake	2:38
7.	"When the Lights Go Out"	December 6, 1990; Human Touch outtake	3:05
8.	"Loose Change"	January 31, 1991; Human Touch outtake	4:18
9.	"Trouble in Paradise" (writers: Roy Bittan, Springsteen)	December 1, 1989; Human Touch outtake	4:37
10.	"Happy"	January 18, 1992; Lucky Town outtake	4:51
11.	"Part Man, Part Monkey"	January 1990; Human Touch outtake	4:28
12.	"Goin' Cali"	January 29, 1991; Human Touch outtake	2:59
13.	"Back in Your Arms"	January 12, 1995; Greatest Hits outtake	4:35
14.	"Brothers Under the Bridge '95"	May 22, 1995; The Ghost of Tom Joad outtake	4:55

== Personnel ==
=== Disc 1 ===
- Bruce Springsteen – guitar, lead vocals, piano
- Steve Van Zandt – guitar, background vocals (tracks 11–17)
- Garry Tallent – bass guitar, background vocals
- Roy Bittan – piano (tracks 9, 11–17)
- David Sancious – piano (tracks 6–8, 10)
- Max Weinberg – drums (tracks 9, 11–17)
- Vini Lopez – drums, background vocals (tracks 6–8, 10–1997)
- Danny Federici – organ, accordion
- Clarence Clemons – saxophone, tambourine, vocals
- Mario Cruz – tenor saxophone on "Hearts of Stone" 1997
- Ed Manion – baritone saxophone on "Hearts of Stone" 1997
- Richie Rosenberg – trombone on "Hearts of Stone" 1997
- Mike Spengler – trumpet on "Hearts of Stone" 1997
- Mark Pender – trumpet on "Hearts of Stone" 1997

=== Disc 2 ===
- Bruce Springsteen – guitar, lead vocals
- Steve Van Zandt – guitar, background vocals
- Garry Tallent – bass guitar
- Roy Bittan – piano
- Max Weinberg – drums
- Danny Federici – organ, glockenspiel
- Clarence Clemons – saxophone, tambourine
- Soozie Tyrell – violin on "Shut Out the Light"

=== Disc 3 ===
- Bruce Springsteen – guitar, lead vocals, bass guitar (tracks 13, 15–18), keyboards (tracks 13, 15–18)
- Steve Van Zandt – guitar, background vocals
- Nils Lofgren – guitar, background vocals on "Janey, Don't You Lose Heart"
- Garry Tallent – bass guitar (tracks 1–12, 14)
- Roy Bittan – piano (tracks 1–12, 14)
- Max Weinberg – drums (tracks 1–12, 14)
- Gary Mallaber – drums (tracks 13, 15–18)
- Danny Federici – organ, glockenspiel
- Clarence Clemons – saxophone, tambourine
- Mario Cruz – tenor saxophone on "Lion's Den" 1997
- Ed Manion – baritone saxophone on "Lion's Den" 1997
- Richie Rosenberg – trombone on "Lion's Den" 1997
- Mike Spengler – trumpet on "Lion's Den" 1997
- Mark Pender – trumpet on "Lion's Den" 1997

=== Disc 4 ===
- Bruce Springsteen – guitar, lead vocals, bass guitar, keyboards, percussion
- Randy Jackson – bass guitar ("Leavin' Train", "Seven Angels", "Sad Eyes", "Trouble in Paradise")
- Garry Tallent – bass guitar ("Back in Your Arms", "Brothers Under the Bridge")
- Roy Bittan – piano ("Seven Angels", "Trouble in Paradise", "Back in Your Arms")
- Jeff Porcaro – drums ("Leavin' Train", "Sad Eyes", "My Lover Man", "When the Lights Go Out", "Trouble in Paradise")
- Omar Hakim – drums on "Part Man, Part Monkey"
- Shawn Pelton – drums ("Seven Angels", "Happy")
- Max Weinberg – drums on "Back in Your Arms"
- Gary Mallaber – drums on "Brothers Under the Bridge"
- Michael Fisher – percussion on "Sad Eyes"
- David Sancious – keyboards ("Sad Eyes", "Part Man, Part Monkey")
- Danny Federici – organ ("Back in Your Arms", "Brothers Under the Bridge")
- Ian McLagan – organ on "Leavin' Train"
- Clarence Clemons – saxophone on "Back in Your Arms"

== Charts ==
Weekly chart performance for Tracks
Chart (1998–2020)	Peak position
Australian Albums (ARIA)	97
Belgian Albums (Ultratop Flanders)	31
Dutch Albums (Album Top 100)	36
European Albums (Music & Media)	20
Finnish Albums (Suomen virallinen lista)	18
French Albums (SNEP)	39
German Albums (Offizielle Top 100)	63
Italian Albums (FIMI)	8
Norwegian Albums (VG-lista)	4
Spanish Albums (Promusicae)	65
Swedish Albums (Sverigetopplistan)	11
UK Albums (Official Charts)	50
US Billboard 200	27

== Certifications ==
Certifications and sales for Tracks
Region	Certification	Certified units/sales
Belgium (BRMA)	Gold	25,000^{*}
Canada (Music Canada)	Gold	50,000^{^}
Spain (Promusicae)	Platinum	100,000^{^}
United Kingdom (BPI)	Silver	60,000^{‡}
United States (RIAA)	Platinum	250,000^{^}
^{*} Sales figures based on certification alone.^{^} Shipments figures based on certification alone.^{‡} Sales+streaming figures based on certification alone.
