= 18 Tracks =

Compilation album by Bruce Springsteen
- Released: April 13, 1999
- Recorded: May 3, 1972 – February 12, 1999
- Genre: Rock
- Length: 71:12
- Label: Columbia
- Producer: Bruce Springsteen

Bruce Springsteen chronology
Tracks (1998)	18 Tracks (1999)	Live in New York City (2001)

Bruce Springsteen and the E Street Band chronology
Tracks (1998)	18 Tracks (1999)	Live in New York City (2001)

Professional ratings
Review scores
Source	Rating
Allmusic	3.5/5 stars
Pitchfork	7.0/10
Tom Hull	B+

18 Tracks is a compilation album by Bruce Springsteen, released in 1999. All but three selections had been on the boxed set Tracks, released six months before. This single album was intended to capture more casual fans, and thus was oriented towards the shorter, more pop-oriented selections from Springsteen's vault.

"The Promise", a Darkness on the Edge of Town outtake that gained considerable reputation as Springsteen's ultimate tale of betrayal following live performances beginning in 1976 and even more so in 1978, was included in a newly recorded version among the three new numbers. "The Fever" had been recorded in 1973 but never seriously considered for inclusion on an album; instead, it became familiar to progressive rock radio listeners as manager Mike Appel released it to such stations in 1974 and it became an underground hit. It was also recorded by Southside Johnny and the Asbury Jukes. Obscure early-1990s Human Touch outtake "Trouble River" was the third previously unreleased cut exclusive to this compilation.

When Springsteen appeared on The Charlie Rose Show in November 1998 to promote Tracks, Charlie Rose asked him specifically about excluding "The Promise" and "The Fever." Springsteen responded that he was never happy about the way "The Promise" had been recorded and that "The Fever" was never one of his favorite songs. Though he would acquiesce and release both songs on 18 Tracks to appease his fans, he re-recorded "The Promise" rather than include any of the rejected outtakes he had in his archives. Though it had been recorded with the full E Street Band during the original sessions for Darkness on the Edge of Town, Springsteen returned to the solo piano arrangement that had been typically used for its earliest live performances, including its debut at Monmouth Arts Centre in Red Bank, New Jersey, on August 3, 1976. Jacob Nierenberg of Consequence of Sound would later write that "this stripped-down version [from 18 Tracks] is even better than the original [studio outtake]."

The new recording of "The Promise" would be nominated in 2000 for two Grammy Awards: Best Rock Song and Best Male Rock Vocal Performance.

Commercial goals for the album were not met, as it only reached No. 64 on the Billboard 200 album chart and became his first album not to receive a RIAA certification. It did modestly better on the UK charts.

== Track listing ==
No.	Title	Length
1.	"Growin' Up" (Demo Version)	2:38
2.	"Seaside Bar Song"	3:33
3.	"Rendezvous"	2:48
4.	"Hearts Of Stone"	4:29
5.	"Where The Bands Are"	3:43
6.	"Loose Ends"	4:00
7.	"I Wanna Be With You"	3:21
8.	"Born In The U.S.A." (Demo Version)	3:10
9.	"My Love Will Not Let You Down"	4:24
10.	"Lion's Den"	2:18
11.	"Pink Cadillac"	3:33
12.	"Janey Don't You Lose Heart"	3:24
13.	"Sad Eyes"	3:47
14.	"Part Man, Part Monkey"	4:28
15.	"Trouble River"	4:18
16.	"Brothers Under The Bridge"	4:55
17.	"The Fever"	7:35
18.	"The Promise"	4:48

== Personnel ==
- Bruce Springsteen – guitar, vocals, lead guitar, piano
- Danny Federici – organ, glockenspiel, accordion, keyboards
- Garry Tallent – bass
- Clarence Clemons – saxophone, percussion, background vocals
- Stevie Van Zandt – guitar
- Roy Bittan – piano, keyboards
- Max Weinberg – drums
- Vini Lopez – drums (2, 17)
- David Sancious – piano (2), organ (2), keyboards (13, 14)
- Jerry Vivino – tenor sax (4)
- Ed Manion – baritone sax (4, 10)
- Mark "The Loveman" Pender – trumpet (4, 10)
- Richie "LaBamba" Rosenberg – trombone (4, 10)
- Mike Spengler – trumpet (4, 10)
- Mario Cruz – tenor sax (10)
- Nils Lofgren – vocals (12)
- Michael Fisher – percussion (13)
- Randy Jackson – bass (13–15)
- Jeff Porcaro – drums (13, 15)
- Omar Hakim – drums (14)
- Gary Mallaber – drums (16)
- Marty Rifkin – pedal steel guitar (16), Dobro (16)
- Soozie Tyrell – violin (16)

== Charts ==
=== Weekly charts ===
Weekly chart performance for 18 Tracks
Chart (1999)	Peak position
Australian Albums (ARIA)	98
Austrian Albums (Ö3 Austria)	3
Belgian Albums (Ultratop Flanders)	34
Belgian Albums (Ultratop Wallonia)	41
Dutch Albums (Album Top 100)	69
European Albums (Music & Media)	7
French Albums (SNEP)	33
German Albums (Offizielle Top 100)	8
Italian Albums (FIMI)	13
Norwegian Albums (VG-lista)	2
Scottish Albums (Official Charts)	36
Swedish Albums (Sverigetopplistan)	1
Swiss Albums (Schweizer Hitparade)	11
UK Albums (Official Charts)	23
US Billboard 200	64

=== Year-end charts ===
Year-end chart performance for 18 Tracks
Chart (1999)	Position
German Albums (Offizielle Top 100)	98

== Certifications ==
Certifications and sales for 18 Tracks
Region	Certification	Certified units/sales
Spain (Promusicae)	Platinum	100,000^{^}
Sweden (GLF)	Gold	40,000^{^}
United Kingdom (BPI)	Silver	60,000^{^}
^{^} Shipments figures based on certification alone.
