= 914 Sound Studios =

Former recording studio in New York State

Coordinates: 41°3′53.6″N 73°56′56.5″W

914 Sound Recording Studios, Inc. was a recording studio in Blauvelt, New York, incorporated by Brooks Arthur on August 28, 1970. Some of the artists who recorded tracks and albums in the studio were Bruce Springsteen, Dusty Springfield, Ramones, Janis Ian, Blood, Sweat & Tears and Melanie. It was named after telephone area code 914, which served as the area code for Rockland County (where the studio was located) until 2000.

== History ==
914 Sound Studios was created by Brooklyn, New York-born Brooks Arthur (born Arnold Brodsky), a well-known sound engineer of the era, who lived in Rockland County. 914 Studios was 20 minutes north of Washington Heights by car and 5 minutes away from the state border with New Jersey. Arthur later explained its genesis: "I was living in Valley Cottage, New York which is down Route 303 from Blauvelt, back in 1971, and I thought it would be a great idea to have a workshop where artists and producers could hang out for a week at a time, relax and build a record at affordable rates. New York City by-the-hour pricing was already getting expensive, and I envisioned a place where artists like Janis, Dusty Springfield and, later, Bruce would be able to roost for a while and create an album. We built a football field behind the studio and the great Blauvelt Diner was within walking distance. Bruce loved that place!"

914 Sound Studios, which opened at a converted gas station in October 1970, was a subsidiary of A & R Recording. Arthur owned one-half, while the other half was split between A & R co-founder Phil Ramone, A & R executive Art Ward and engineer Don Frey.

Bruce Springsteen began recording at 914 Sound Studios once he signed his first record deal, with Columbia Records in 1972. Manager and producer Mike Appel chose it in order to economize in using the $25,000 advance they had been given; he saw it as "a top-notch facility" that allowed "high quality at reasonable rates" due to its out-of-the-way location. Recordings made at the studio during 1972 would make their way onto Springsteen's debut album Greetings from Asbury Park, N.J. and would also be used as demos for Appel's publishing company, Laurel Canyon Music Publishing. Some of these demos would later appear as radio-only releases ("The Fever") or on his late 1990s Tracks box set, or on innumerable bootleg recordings. All of Springsteen's second album, The Wild, the Innocent & the E Street Shuffle, was recorded at 914 Sound in 1973. Still short on money, some members of Springsteen's E Street Band slept in a tent in back of the studio rather than rent a hotel room or commute to the Jersey Shore. The membership of the band even changed temporarily due to the studio; Louis Lahav, the studio's resident sound engineer, provided the link whereby his wife, violinist and vocalist Suki Lahav, joined the band for six months.

The first song for Springsteen's next album, the classic "Born to Run", was also recorded at 914 Sound in 1974. A New Jersey fan and a personal friend of Springsteen at the time, Barry Rebo (who later became the chairman of Emerging Pictures, a national network of digital cinema theaters), used his black-and-white Super-8 film camera to record Springsteen at the 914 Sound Studio. Springsteen labored there for months, between playing club dates, over the four-and-a-half minutes of "Born to Run". However, new Springsteen producer and future manager Jon Landau characterized 914 Sound as a "beat-up old funky studio" where, among other things, the piano, which was at the core of the songs, would not stay in tune. Landau also felt that the studio owners had not invested in the most up-to-date equipment and that the sound of the studio was dull. He moved recording of the remainder of the Born to Run album to The Record Plant in New York City.

Dusty Springfield recorded the songs for her intended-to-be 1974 album Longing at the studio, with Brooks Arthur producing, but for various reasons the album was abandoned. The Ramones recorded tracks in 1975 at the studio for an alleged 1975 East Berlin EP, Judy's In The Basement - The 914 Sessions. Janis Ian teamed up with Brooks Arthur for three albums recorded at 914 Sound, including 1975's number-one Between the Lines, containing her hit "At Seventeen". Between the Lines was the final project at 914 that Arthur worked on.

The partners sold the studio in 1978, while the corporation (914 Sound Recording Studios, Inc.) formally dissolved in 1982.
