= Blauvelt, New York =

- Census-designated place
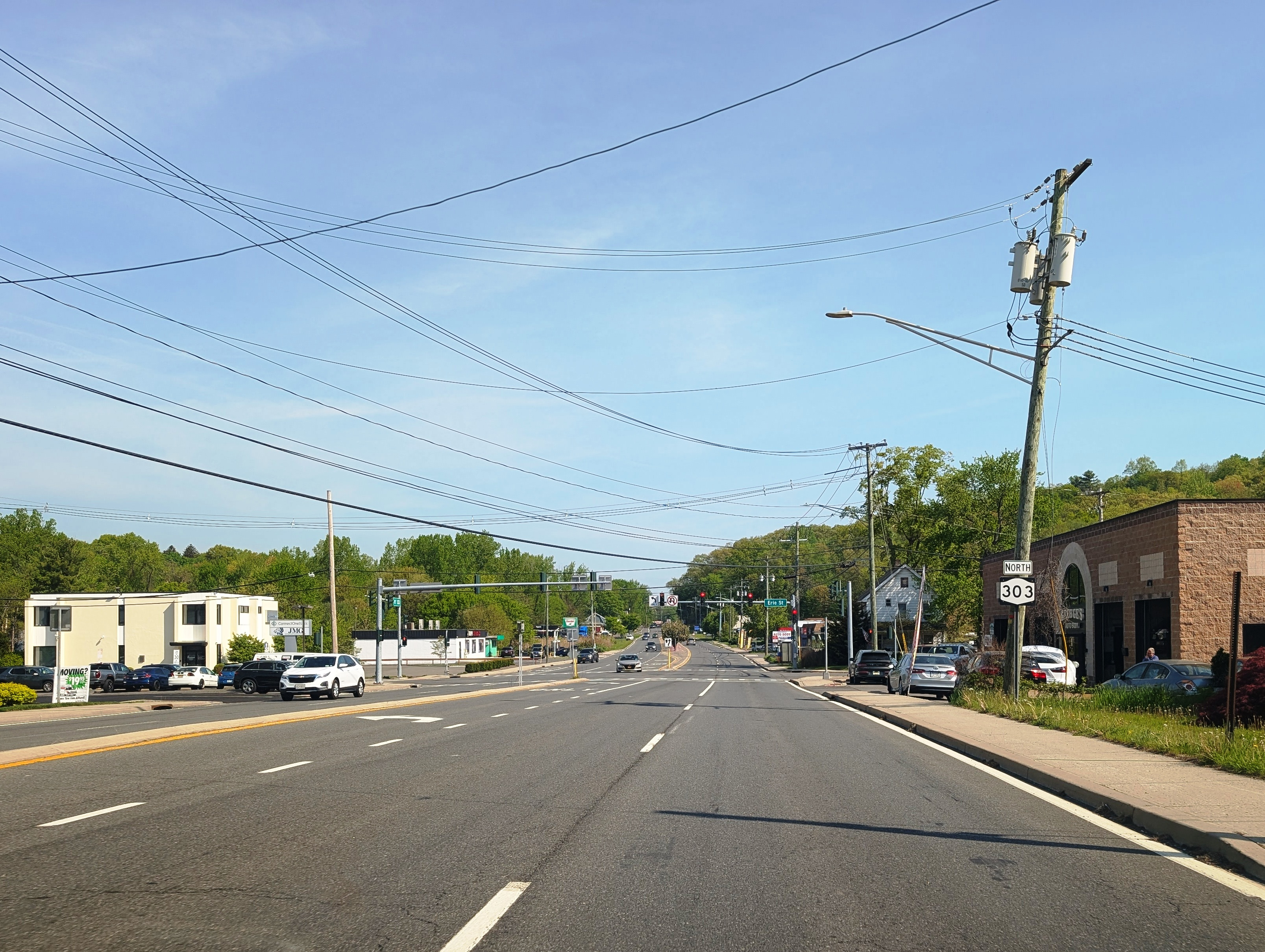
- NY 303 northbound in Blauvelt

- Location in Rockland County and the state of New York.

- Location within the state of New York
- Coordinates: 41°3′52″N 73°57′25″W
- Country: United States
- State: New York
- County: Rockland
- Town: Orangetown

Area
  - Total: 4.62 sq mi (11.96 km^{2})
  - Land: 4.51 sq mi (11.68 km^{2})
  - Water: 0.11 sq mi (0.28 km^{2})
- Elevation: 200 ft (61 m)

Population (2020)
  - Total: 5,548
  - Density: 1,230.1/sq mi (474.94/km^{2})
- Time zone: UTC-5 (Eastern (EST))
  - Summer (DST): UTC-4 (EDT)
- ZIP code: 10913
- Area code: 845
- FIPS code: 36-06860
- GNIS feature ID: 0944231

Blauvelt (English pronunciation: /ˈblɔːvɛlt/) is a hamlet, about 20 miles northwest of New York City. It is a census-designated place, formerly known as Greenbush and then Blauveltville, in Orangetown, Rockland County, New York, United States. It is located north of Tappan, east of Nauraushaun and Pearl River, south of Central Nyack, and west of Orangeburg. As of the 2020 census, Blauvelt had a population of 5,548.

== Geography ==
Blauvelt is located at 41°03′52″N 73°57′25″W (41.064396, -73.956881).

According to the United States Census Bureau, the CDP has a total area of 4.6 square miles (12 km^{2}), of which 4.6 square miles (12 km^{2}) is land and 0.1 square miles (0.26 km^{2}), or 1.52%, is water.

== Demographics ==
Historical population
Census	Pop.	Note	%±
2020	5,548		—
U.S. Decennial Census

=== 2020 census ===
As of the 2020 census, Blauvelt had a population of 5,548. The median age was 40.8 years. 20.7% of residents were under the age of 18 and 15.9% of residents were 65 years of age or older. For every 100 females there were 93.1 males, and for every 100 females age 18 and over there were 92.6 males age 18 and over.

100.0% of residents lived in urban areas, while 0.0% lived in rural areas.

There were 1,607 households in Blauvelt, of which 36.0% had children under the age of 18 living in them. Of all households, 68.5% were married-couple households, 11.0% were households with a male householder and no spouse or partner present, and 17.5% were households with a female householder and no spouse or partner present. About 13.2% of all households were made up of individuals and 8.7% had someone living alone who was 65 years of age or older.

There were 1,692 housing units, of which 5.0% were vacant. The homeowner vacancy rate was 2.0% and the rental vacancy rate was 8.4%.

Racial composition as of the 2020 census
Race	Number	Percent
White	4,293	77.4%
Black or African American	170	3.1%
American Indian and Alaska Native	15	0.3%
Asian	372	6.7%
Native Hawaiian and Other Pacific Islander	4	0.1%
Some other race	258	4.7%
Two or more races	436	7.9%
Hispanic or Latino (of any race)	769	13.9%

=== 2000 census ===
As of the census of 2000, there were 5,207 people, 1,564 households, and 1,313 families residing in the CDP. The population density was 1,144.4 inhabitants per square mile (441.9/km^{2}). There were 1,588 housing units at an average density of 349.0 per square mile (134.7/km^{2}). The racial makeup of the CDP was 88.42% White, 1.56% African American, 0.02% Native American, 7.34% Asian, 1.44% from other races, and 1.23% from two or more races. Hispanic or Latino of any race were 5.93% of the population.

There were 1,564 households, out of which 38.7% had children under the age of 18 living with them, 71.9% were married couples living together, 8.8% had a female householder with no husband present, and 16.0% were non-families. 13.6% of all households were made up of individuals, and 8.2% had someone living alone who was 65 years of age or older. The average household size was 3.08 and the average family size was 3.40.

In the CDP, the population was spread out, with 25.6% under the age of 18, 9.8% from 18 to 24, 25.9% from 25 to 44, 22.2% from 45 to 64, and 16.6% who were 65 years of age or older. The median age was 38 years. For every 100 females, there were 90.4 males. For every 100 females age 18 and over, there were 88.7 males.

The median income for a household in the CDP was $103,071, and the median income for a family was $104,944. Males had a median income of $90,125 versus $80,096 for females. The per capita income for the CDP was $94,211. About 1.9% of families and 3.5% of the population were below the poverty line, including 2.1% of those under age 18 and 11.5% of those age 65 or over.

== History ==
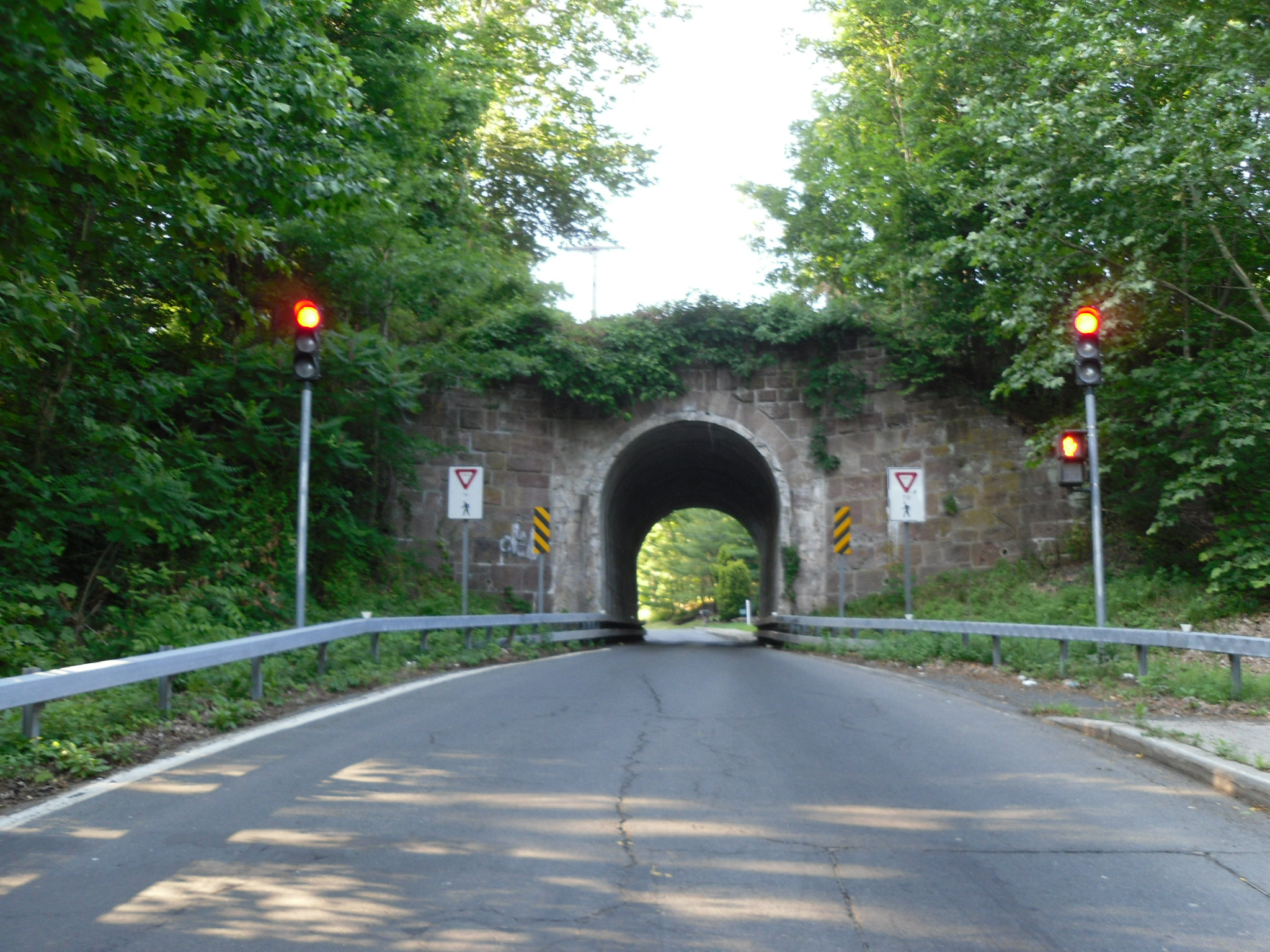
Rockland County Route 23 - New York

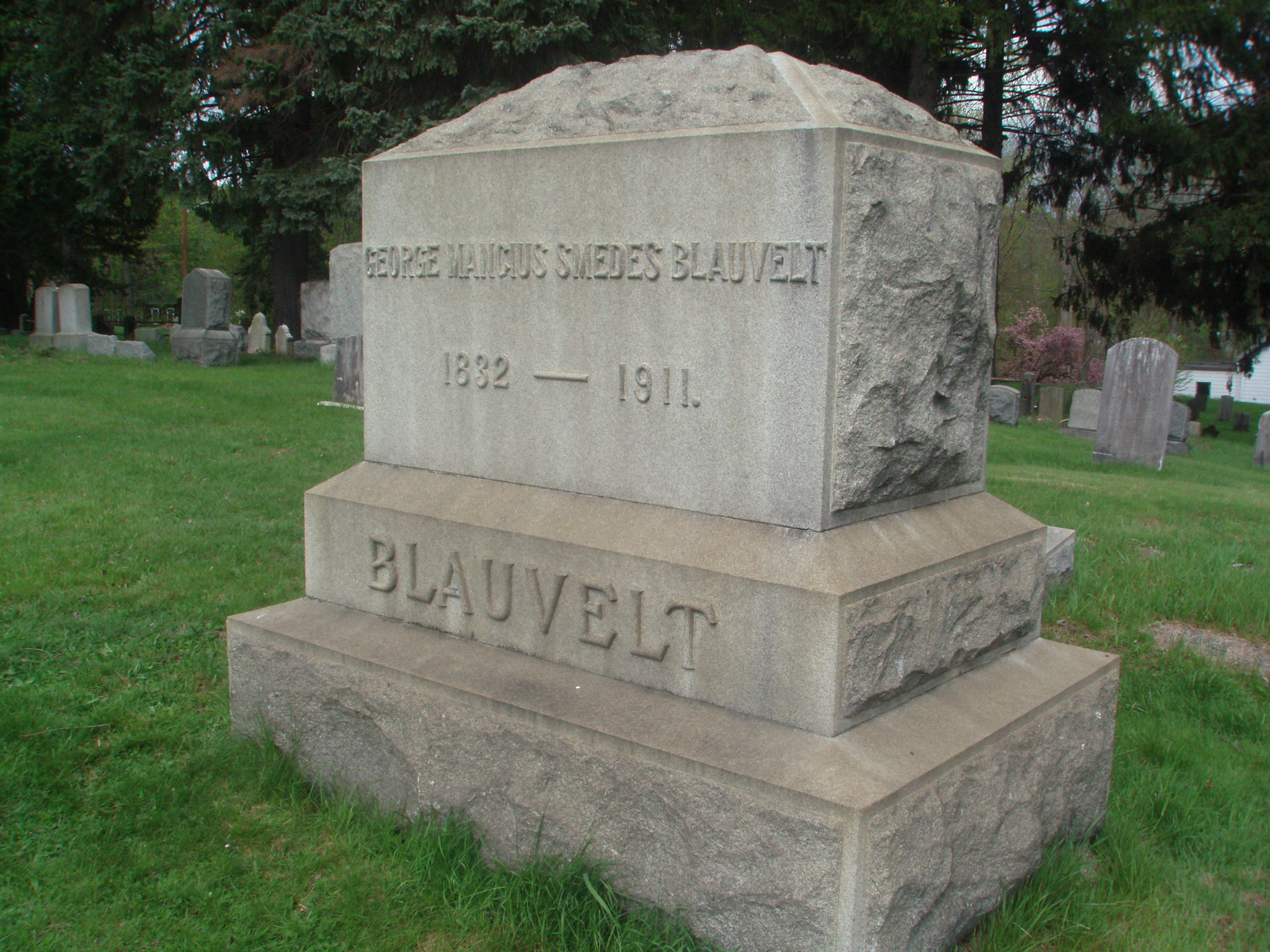
Gravestone of George Mancius Smeades Blauvelt, a descendant of Pieter Blauwveld

The name "Blauvelt", of Dutch origin, is that of a prominent family that settled in the area in the 17th century. The etymology of the name probably comes from the coat of arms adopted by the first Blauvelt, Pieter Blauwveld, a prominent trader in the Netherlands. Literally, it means "blue-field", or "blue pasture fields", likely a reference to the blue and yellow shields hung on Blauwveld's ships (a common 14th century Dutch method of identifying the owner). The first Blauvelt in America was a peasant farmer who cultivated tobacco on the estate of Kiliaen van Rensselaer, the first patroon of the Manor of Rensselaerswyck near Albany, New York, in 1638.

In 1909, New York State purchased property in Blauvelt to create Camp Bluefields, a large rifle range used to train members of the New York National Guard prior to World War I. The property was later used by the YWCA, ROTC, Columbia University and the U.S. Army for various purposes before being abandoned following World War II. The land is today the site of Blauvelt State Park.

In 1972, Robert Salvia and Professor Dr. Paul Olson of the Lamont–Doherty Earth Observatory, a research unit of Columbia University located on a 157-acre (0.64 km^{2}) campus in Palisades, New York, discovered several 200-million-year-old dinosaur tracks that were identified as being from the coelophysis. Some of these tracks were sent to the New York State Museum in Albany, New York for identification and preservation. The fossils date from the Triassic period and are claimed to be the only dinosaur tracks ever discovered in the state of New York.

The 914 Sound Studios was a musical recording studio in the 1970s. Several albums were recorded in Blauvelt, including the title track of Bruce Springsteen's album Born to Run in 1974.

== Tourism ==
=== Historical markers ===
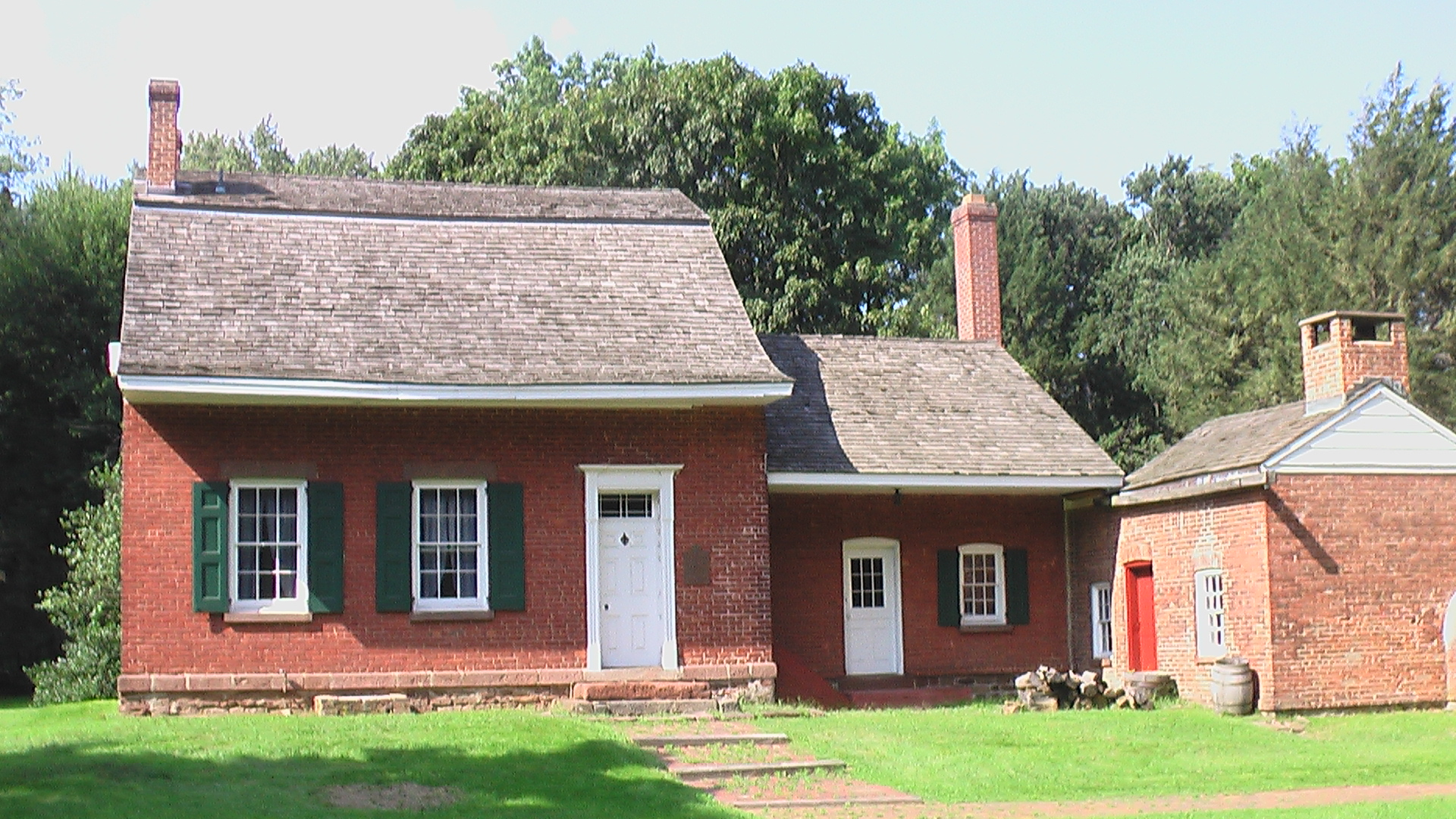
Jacob Blauvelt House In New City, NY

The Jacob J. Blauvelt house and its four remaining acres of land had been in the Blauvelt family since the time it was built, in 1832, up until when it was acquired by the Historical Society of Rockland County in 1970. The Blauvelt family first arrived in America in 1638, and first arrived in Rockland County in 1683. Their genealogy today contains more than 26,000 names.

- Johannes J. Blauvelt - 514 Western Highway - Jacob A. Blauvelt and family, the first of seven generations of Blauvelts to live on this farm, occupied a log structure nearby early in the 18th century. Jacob's son, Johannes J. Blauvelt, built the sandstone south wing of the home ca. 1755. The center section was added after the Revolutionary War, and the north wing ca. 1862. This house was used as an officers' club during World War II.
- Jacob J. Blauvelt (1757–1834) - 525 Western Highway
- Johannes Isaac Blauvelt - 820 Western Highway - Johannes (1743–1828) was a charter member of the Greenbush Church. His son David began Rockland County's first tobacco farm and business there. Abraham M. Blauvelt (gunsmith) repaired guns and watches here and rented boats on the Hackensack River in the rear. The Blauvelt family occupied these premises for 135 years. The Dutch farmhouse is located on the northwest corner of the Tappen Patent and contains many original construction features.
- Blauvelt-Norris-Burr House - 608 Western Highway - The main section and south kitchen of this Dutch home were built ca. 1790-1800, the north addition ca. 1840, on land previously owned by David Bogert. The first known occupant was Garret I. Blauvelt. In 1853 the farm was acquired by John S. Norris, an architect and builder. In 1885 it was purchased by the Burr family who owned it for 56 years. The south chimney of the main section of the house differs from the north, in that it contains three fireplaces off a center chimney, suggesting it is the remnant of a previous building. In checking with the Historical Society, there are two maps of early Rockland County homesteads — the earlier one dated 1750. The Blauvelt-Norris-Burr House appears on that map suggesting it was built before 1750. Also, the house is larger than most in the area, and the construction of the upper floor suggests it is not as old as the bottom. Photographs from the later part of the 1800s show the addition of a front porch, which explains the unusually large section of clapboard between the stone foundation and roof.

=== Landmarks and places of interest ===
- Greenbush Presbyterian Church - Western Highway - In October 1812, ten founders, nine of whom were Blauvelts, held their first organizational meeting for this new church. The first stone church was dedicated in 1824. It was destroyed by fire in 1835. A second church built on the old walls was dedicated in 1837. It burned in 1882. The present church, in the Gothic style, was dedicated in 1883, with the tower and bell erected in 1896. Many Blauvelts are buried in the cemetery

== Notable people ==
- Conrad Hoffmann Jr., Christian missionary, died in Blauvelt
- Amos Pollard, a defender of the Alamo
- Jim Rivera (1921–2017), Major League Baseball player
- Jo Anne Worley, actress and comedienne
