= The River Tour (2016) =

2016–17 concert tour by Bruce Springsteen and the E Street Band

- Tour by Bruce Springsteen and the E Street Band
- Location: Europe; North America; Oceania
- Associated album: The Ties That Bind: The River Collection
- Start date: January 16, 2016
- End date: February 25, 2017
- Legs: 4
- No. of shows: 89
- Box office: $306.5 million

Bruce Springsteen concert chronology
- High Hopes Tour (2014); The River Tour (2016–17); Springsteen on Broadway (2017–18; 2021)

The River Tour was a concert tour by Bruce Springsteen and the E Street Band in support of Springsteen's 2015 The Ties That Bind: The River Collection box set and in celebration of the 35th anniversary of Springsteen's 1980 album, The River. The River Tour ended in September 2016. Subsequently, the Summer '17 tour in Australia and New Zealand continued the tour using the same promotional image from the original legs.

The River Tour was the top grossing worldwide tour of 2016, pulling in $268.3 million globally, and was the highest-grossing tour since 2014 for any artist. Springsteen and the E Street Band also hold the biggest boxscore for 2016, with the May 27 and 29 shows at Dublin's Croke Park taking in $19,228,100 from 160,188 attendance for two sellout shows.

The tour marked the first tour in two years for Springsteen and the E Street Band. All shows on the first North American leg of tour and some shows from the second leg featured a full-length sequential performance of The River album. Other shows featured a large part of the album, albeit not always in album order. Many of the shows lasted over three and a half hours with around 33 songs performed. Springsteen's show on September 7, 2016, at Citizens Bank Park in Philadelphia clocked in at 4 hours and 4 minutes, his longest show in the United States and the second-longest ever in his career, at two minutes shy of his 2012 show in Helsinki.

The tour was attended by many notable celebrities including; Snoop Dogg (LA show) Aimee Soller (KFC Yum! Centre) Matt Damon (Albany Show)

== Background ==
The original River Tour began in October 1980 and continued through September 1981. With sets that regularly approached the four-hour range, the 140-date international tour firmly established a reputation for Bruce Springsteen and the E Street Band as marathon performers.

Springsteen released The Ties That Bind: The River Collection on December 4, 2015. The box set features the original 1980 The River album along with many outtakes from the album's sessions.

The tour was announced on December 4, 2015, with tickets going on sale seven days later. It came unexpectedly, as Springsteen was working on a new solo album and planned to tour in support of that. However, with it already having been two years since his last tour with the E Street Band, Springsteen chose not to delay the next band tour even further. In November 2015, Springsteen's manager, Jon Landau, suggested performing The River at a few small shows in New York City and Los Angeles; however, Springsteen said it would take too long to rehearse and suggested doing twenty shows. Drummer Max Weinberg said he got the call from Springsteen on Thanksgiving, a week before the tour was announced to the public. "In all of my professional engagements, I have what I call the Springsteen Clause. It's inviolate. It's my own version of force majeure. It's an act of God or Bruce Springsteen. And it works all the time," Weinberg said. Nils Lofgren had to change dates on his solo tour, while Gary Tallent had to postpone his.

This was the first Springsteen tour in which all dates featured the same album performed in its entirety. Unlike the previous few tours, the touring lineup was downsized and did not feature a full horn section or backing vocalists. "I knew the basis of the show was going to be The River, and that was a small rock group. The tighter lineup feels much more like the old days", Springsteen said. Like previous tours, Patti Scialfa was not present at every show due to her responsibilities as a mother supporting her daughter in her equestrian career. Due to Scialfa's not being present at every show, along with no choir, Garry Tallent, standing in her spot on stage, sang backup vocals on a consistent basis on the front line.

== Itinerary ==
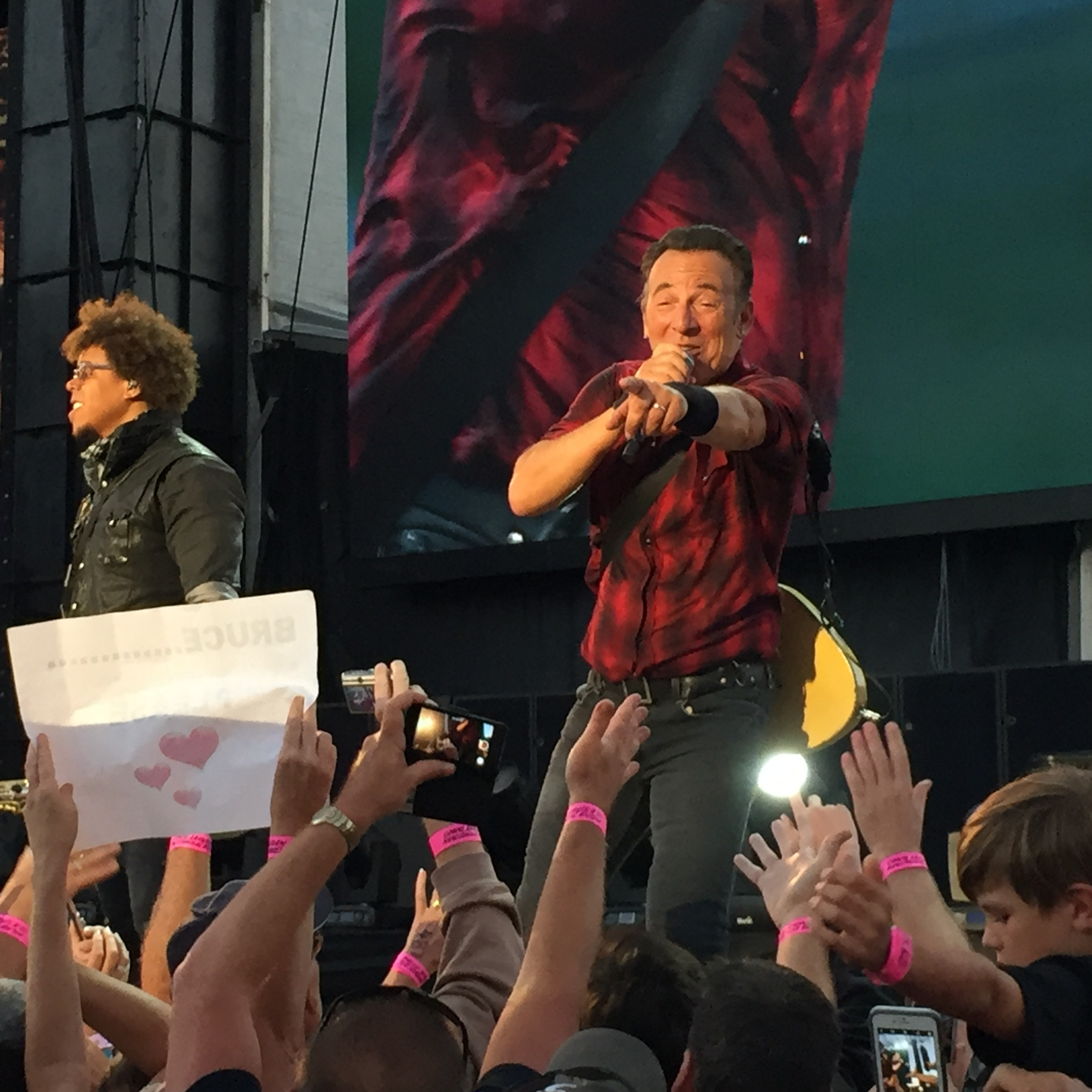
Springsteen performing during the final date of Summer '17, on February 25, 2017, at Mount Smart Stadium, Auckland

=== North American leg 1 ===
The tour got underway in Pittsburgh on January 16, 2016. Each show kicked off with "Meet Me in the City", followed by the full album performance of The River, and concluding with a twelve-song set featuring songs from the rest of Springsteen's catalog. The show usually finished with a cover of the Isley Brothers' "Shout". The show scheduled for January 24, 2016, at Madison Square Garden was postponed due to a record-setting snowstorm that hit the East Coast. The show was rescheduled for March 28. On April 23, 2016, at the first of two Brooklyn shows to end the first leg of the tour, Springsteen said that Brooklyn would mark "the last two nights we're officially playing The River from start to finish". That night he opened with "Purple Rain" in tribute to Prince, who had just died.

=== European leg ===
On July 13, 2016, for the first time since the end of the first North American leg of the tour, The River was performed in its entirety.

=== North American leg 2 ===
Springsteen and the E Street Band kicked off the second North American leg of the tour on August 23, 2016, in East Rutherford, New Jersey, at MetLife Stadium. The show opened with a performance of "New York City Serenade"; that song became the opener for all shows on this leg of the tour. The final MetLife Stadium performance on August 30 clocked in at over 4 hours and opened with a run of nine original songs written in 1973 or earlier, plus early live favorites Summertime Blues and Pretty Flamingo. The practice of playing a string of tracks from Greetings from Asbury Park, N.J., and The Wild, the Innocent, and the E Street Shuffle continued throughout the rest of this leg.

The show on September 3, 2016, in Virginia Beach was postponed until September 5, 2016, due to inclement weather. On September 7, 2016, at Citizens Bank Park in Philadelphia, Springsteen played for 4 hours and 4 minutes, his longest show in the United States and second-longest ever. Springsteen performed in Pittsburgh, Pennsylvania, on September 11, 2016, the 15th anniversary of the 9/11 terrorist attacks. The show featured six songs from Springsteen's 9/11 inspired album, The Rising. Springsteen wrapped up The River Tour 2016 on September 14, 2016, in Foxborough, Massachusetts.

=== Oceania leg / Summer '17 Tour ===
On September 12, 2016, a fourth leg of the tour was announced that included nine shows in Australia and New Zealand in early 2017, named Summer '17 but using the same promotional artwork as the 2016 tour.

Springsteen's concert in Christchurch on February 21, 2017, fell on the eve of the anniversary of the earthquake which devastated the city's center. In the weeks that followed the quake, Springsteen's song "My City of Ruins" was adopted by Christchurch as an unofficial anthem. Springsteen played the song during the concert, dedicating it to the people of the city.

== Record-breaking shows ==
Springsteen has been known for lengthy shows, and this tour continued that trend. The show on September 7, 2016, at Citizens Bank Park in Philadelphia, ran 4 hours and 4 minutes, which stands as Springsteen's longest show in the United States and second-longest ever after a 2012 show in Helsinki that ran two minutes longer.

== Ticket scalping ==
As with previous Springsteen tours, ticket scalpers were a major problem when it came to buying tickets. Tickets for Springsteen's New York City shows began popping up on resale sites such as StubHub and eBay on December 7, 2015, four days before they went on sale to the public. Scalpers were re-selling tickets not yet available for as much as $5,000. This prompted New York Attorney General Eric Schneiderman to launch an investigation into how this happened and to write a letter demanding that both companies immediately remove any listings for ticket sales. When tickets finally went on sale on December 11, many fans again were shut out from buying tickets as most venues sold out quickly; within minutes, tickets were appearing for hundreds to thousands of dollars more on resale sites. According to reports, Springsteen's shows sold out in record time. Springsteen's show in Newark, New Jersey, at the Prudential Center sold out in a few minutes. His previous 2012 show at the same venue took two hours to sell out.

== Recordings ==
All shows were professionally recorded and released on live.brucespringsteen.net. Many were also featured on E Street Radio.

== Set list ==
This set list is representative of the average setlist of the tour's first North American leg as conducted by Setlist.fm, which represents all concerts for the duration of the tour's first leg. The full album performance was dropped following the first leg, although it was resurrected for a few shows on the second leg of the tour.

1. "Meet Me in the City"

The River

2. "The Ties That Bind"
3. "Sherry Darling"
4. "Jackson Cage"
5. "Two Hearts"
6. "Independence Day"
7. "Hungry Heart"
8. "Out in the Street"
9. "Crush on You"
10. "You Can Look (But You Better Not Touch)"
11. "I Wanna Marry You"
12. "The River"
13. "Point Blank"
14. "Cadillac Ranch"
15. "I'm a Rocker"
16. "Fade Away"
17. "Stolen Car"
18. "Ramrod"
19. "The Price You Pay"
20. "Drive All Night"
21. "Wreck on the Highway"

Post-River

22. "Badlands"
23. "Lonesome Day"
24. "No Surrender"
25. "She's the One"
26. "Because the Night"
27. "The Rising"
28. "Thunder Road"

Encore

29. "Born to Run"
30. "Dancing in the Dark"
31. "Rosalita (Come Out Tonight)"
32. "Tenth Avenue Freeze-Out"
33. "Bobby Jean"
34. "Shout" (The Isley Brothers cover)

== Tour dates ==
List of concerts, showing date, city, country, venue, tickets sold, number of available tickets and amount of gross revenue
Date	City	Country	Venue	Opening Act	Attendance	Revenue
North America
January 16, 2016	Pittsburgh	United States	Consol Energy Center	—N/a	18,353 / 18,353	$2,412,020
January 19, 2016	Chicago	United States	United Center	—N/a	19,120 / 19,120	$2,756,475
January 27, 2016	New York City	United States	Madison Square Garden	—N/a	18,474 / 18,474	$2,508,528
January 29, 2016	Washington, D.C.	United States	Verizon Center	—N/a	18,093 / 18,093	$2,383,850
January 31, 2016	Newark	United States	Prudential Center	—N/a	16,539 / 16,539	$2,227,836
February 2, 2016	Toronto	Canada	Air Canada Centre	—N/a	18,134 / 18,134	$1,793,936
February 4, 2016	Boston	United States	TD Garden	—N/a	17,039 / 17,039	$2,062,417
February 8, 2016	Albany	United States	Times Union Center	—N/a	15,162 / 15,162	$1,966,730
February 10, 2016	Hartford	United States	XL Center	—N/a	14,672 / 14,672	$2,080,294
February 12, 2016	Philadelphia	United States	Wells Fargo Center	—N/a	19,411 / 19,411	$2,503,356
February 16, 2016	Sunrise	United States	BB&T Center	—N/a	18,658 / 18,658	$2,174,905
February 18, 2016	Atlanta	United States	Philips Arena	—N/a	16,713 / 17,450	$1,888,030
February 21, 2016	Louisville	United States	KFC Yum! Center	—N/a	15,730 / 16,900	$1,847,730
February 23, 2016	Cleveland	United States	Quicken Loans Arena	—N/a	19,071 / 19,071	$2,520,055
February 25, 2016	Buffalo	United States	First Niagara Center	—N/a	18,351 / 18,351	$2,186,795
February 27, 2016	Rochester	United States	Blue Cross Arena	—N/a	12,581 / 12,581	$1,712,080
February 29, 2016	Saint Paul	United States	Xcel Energy Center	—N/a	18,628 / 18,628	$2,576,190
March 3, 2016	Milwaukee	United States	BMO Harris Bradley Center	—N/a	17,653 / 17,653	$1,969,655
March 6, 2016	St. Louis	United States	Chaifetz Arena	—N/a	9,965 / 9,965	$1,334,370
March 10, 2016	Phoenix	United States	Talking Stick Resort Arena	—N/a	16,480 / 16,480	$2,050,630
March 13, 2016	Oakland	United States	Oracle Arena	—N/a	17,117 / 17,117	$2,245,715
March 15, 2016	Los Angeles	United States	Memorial Sports Arena	—N/a	49,302 / 49,302	$7,050,775
March 17, 2016	Los Angeles	United States	Memorial Sports Arena	—N/a	49,302 / 49,302	$7,050,775
March 19, 2016	Los Angeles	United States	Memorial Sports Arena	—N/a	49,302 / 49,302	$7,050,775
March 22, 2016	Portland	United States	Moda Center	—N/a	12,074 / 13,700	$1,639,915
March 24, 2016	Seattle	United States	KeyArena	—N/a	14,767 / 14,767	$1,929,695
March 28, 2016^{[A]}	New York City	United States	Madison Square Garden	—N/a	18,484 / 18,484	$2,508,003
March 31, 2016	Denver	United States	Pepsi Center	—N/a	16,770 / 18,540	$2,211,320
April 3, 2016	Oklahoma City	United States	Chesapeake Energy Arena	—N/a	12,603 / 14,332	$1,557,353
April 5, 2016	Dallas	United States	American Airlines Center	—N/a	15,563 / 16,961	$1,991,405
April 7, 2016	Kansas City	United States	Sprint Center	—N/a	12,286 / 13,813	$1,557,745
April 12, 2016	Columbus	United States	Schottenstein Center	—N/a	12,008 / 13,941	$1,568,810
April 14, 2016	Auburn Hills	United States	The Palace of Auburn Hills	—N/a	15,754 / 15,754	$1,949,443
April 18, 2016	University Park	United States	Bryce Jordan Center	—N/a	14,447 / 15,000	$2,038,548
April 20, 2016	Baltimore	United States	Royal Farms Arena	—N/a	14,124 / 14,124	$2,054,260
April 23, 2016	Brooklyn	United States	Barclays Center	—N/a	33,248 / 33,248	$4,641,260
April 25, 2016	Brooklyn	United States	Barclays Center	—N/a	33,248 / 33,248	$4,641,260
Europe
May 14, 2016	Barcelona	Spain	Camp Nou	—N/a	64,865 / 64,865	$6,014,054
May 17, 2016	San Sebastián	Spain	Anoeta Stadium	—N/a	41,100 / 41,100	$3,839,494
May 19, 2016^{[B]}	Lisbon	Portugal	Parque da Bela Vista	—N/a	—N/a	—N/a
May 21, 2016	Madrid	Spain	Santiago Bernabéu Stadium	—N/a	55,695 / 55,695	$5,359,310
May 25, 2016	Manchester	England	City of Manchester Stadium	—N/a	48,614 / 50,000	$5,785,157
May 27, 2016	Dublin	Ireland	Croke Park	—N/a	160,188 / 160,188	$19,228,100
May 29, 2016	Dublin	Ireland	Croke Park	—N/a	160,188 / 160,188	$19,228,100
June 1, 2016	Glasgow	Scotland	Hampden Park	—N/a	45,330 / 45,330	$5,314,504
June 3, 2016	Coventry	England	Ricoh Arena	—N/a	36,588 / 36,588	$4,523,864
June 5, 2016	London	England	Wembley Stadium	—N/a	68,696 / 68,696	$9,251,527
June 14, 2016	The Hague	Netherlands	Malieveld	—N/a	67,715 / 67,715	$5,980,218
June 17, 2016	Munich	Germany	Olympiastadion Munich	—N/a	54,119 / 54,119	$4,797,890
June 19, 2016	Berlin	Germany	Olympiastadion Berlin	—N/a	66,464 / 66,464	$5,932,416
June 22, 2016	Copenhagen	Denmark	Telia Parken	—N/a	50,178 / 50,178	$4,931,456
June 25, 2016	Gothenburg	Sweden	Ullevi	—N/a	124,734 / 124,734	$10,016,748
June 27, 2016	Gothenburg	Sweden	Ullevi	—N/a	124,734 / 124,734	$10,016,748
June 29, 2016	Oslo	Norway	Ullevaal Stadion	—N/a	30,283 / 30,283	$3,111,732
July 3, 2016	Milan	Italy	San Siro	—N/a	104,646 / 104,646	$8,998,967
July 5, 2016	Milan	Italy	San Siro	—N/a	104,646 / 104,646	$8,998,967
July 9, 2016^{[C]}	Werchter	Belgium	Werchter Festival Grounds	—N/a	—N/a	—N/a
July 11, 2016	Paris	France	AccorHotels Arena	—N/a	35,344 / 35,344	$4,103,898
July 13, 2016	Paris	France	AccorHotels Arena	—N/a	35,344 / 35,344	$4,103,898
July 16, 2016^{[D]}	Rome	Italy	Circus Maximus	—N/a	56,369 / 56,369	$5,258,043
July 20, 2016	Horsens	Denmark	CASA Arena Horsens	—N/a	29,423 / 29,423	$2,927,130
July 23, 2016	Gothenburg	Sweden	Ullevi	—N/a	64,622 / 64,622	$5,052,563
July 26, 2016	Trondheim	Norway	Granåsen	—N/a	36,994 / 36,994	$3,897,365
July 28, 2016	Oslo	Norway	Frogner Park	—N/a	37,126 / 37,126	$3,858,353
July 31, 2016	Zürich	Switzerland	Letzigrund	—N/a	36,728 / 36,728	$5,178,033
North America
August 23, 2016	East Rutherford	United States	MetLife Stadium	—N/a	153,930 / 153,930	$18,239,039
August 25, 2016	East Rutherford	United States	MetLife Stadium	—N/a	153,930 / 153,930	$18,239,039
August 28, 2016	Chicago	United States	United Center	—N/a	19,313 / 19,313	$2,459,600
August 30, 2016	East Rutherford	United States	MetLife Stadium	—N/a	– (Note: Boxscore combined with the boxscore from August 23–25, 2016.)	– (Note: Boxscore combined with the boxscore from August 23–25, 2016.)
September 1, 2016	Washington, D.C.	United States	Nationals Park	—N/a	36,463 / 36,463	$4,627,705
September 5, 2016^{[E]}	Virginia Beach	United States	Veterans United; Home Loans Amphitheater	—N/a	11,629 / 15,000	$1,082,764
September 7, 2016	Philadelphia	United States	Citizens Bank Park	—N/a	77,670 / 80,000	$10,048,796
September 9, 2016	Philadelphia	United States	Citizens Bank Park	—N/a	77,670 / 80,000	$10,048,796
September 11, 2016	Pittsburgh	United States	Consol Energy Center	—N/a	16,674 / 18,353	$2,117,125
September 14, 2016	Foxborough	United States	Gillette Stadium	—N/a	48,324 / 51,664	$5,439,521
Oceania
January 22, 2017	Perth	Australia	Perth Arena	—N/a	39,957 / 39,957	$5,914,782
January 25, 2017	Perth	Australia	Perth Arena	—N/a	39,957 / 39,957	$5,914,782
January 27, 2017	Perth	Australia	Perth Arena	—N/a	39,957 / 39,957	$5,914,782
January 30, 2017	Adelaide	Australia	Adelaide Entertainment Centre	—N/a	10,920 / 10,920	$1,612,374
February 2, 2017	Melbourne	Australia	Melbourne Rectangular Stadium	Jet	51,192 / 54,000	$7,384,735
February 4, 2017	Melbourne	Australia	Melbourne Rectangular Stadium	Jet; Diesel	51,192 / 54,000	$7,384,735
February 7, 2017	Sydney	Australia	Sydney SuperDome	—N/a	31,323 / 32,000	$4,546,210
February 9, 2017	Sydney	Australia	Sydney SuperDome	—N/a	31,323 / 32,000	$4,546,210
February 11, 2017	Mount Macedon	Australia	Hanging Rock	Jet; Diesel	19,644 / 19,644	$2,895,699
February 14, 2017	Brisbane	Australia	Brisbane Entertainment Centre	—N/a	25,220 / 25,220	$3,896,163
February 16, 2017	Brisbane	Australia	Brisbane Entertainment Centre	—N/a	25,220 / 25,220	$3,896,163
February 18, 2017	Hunter Valley	Australia	Hope Estate Winery	Jet; Diesel	19,722 / 19,722	$2,848,983
February 21, 2017	Christchurch	New Zealand	Rugby League Park	Jet; Marlon Williams	29,254 / 29,254	$4,106,197
February 25, 2017	Auckland	New Zealand	Mount Smart Stadium	Jet; Marlon Williams	33,952 / 40,000	$4,767,320
TOTAL					2,486,058 / 2,520,141 (98.6%)	$293,703,964

N/A

Festivals and other miscellaneous performances

^{A} This concert was rescheduled from the show originally scheduled on January 24 which was postponed due to snow.
^{B} This concert was part of the "Rock in Rio Lisbon"
^{C} This concert was part of "TW Classic"
^{D} This concert was part of the "Rock in Roma"
^{E} This concert was rescheduled from the show originally scheduled on September 3 which was postponed due to inclement weather caused by Tropical Storm Hermine.

== Cancelled/postponed shows ==
On April 8, 2016, Springsteen announced on his website that he was cancelling his concert, two days later, at the Greensboro Coliseum in North Carolina, in protest of the state legislature's new law, the HB2 (nicknamed the "Bathroom Bill"), which banned transgender people from using public restrooms of the gender with which they identify and overturned local laws that ban employers from discriminating against certain workers. "Some things are more important than a rock show", he remarked. Springsteen was forced to postpone his concert on September 3, 2016, in Virginia Beach due to inclement weather from Hurricane Hermine. The show was rescheduled for two days later.

List of cancelled and postponed concerts, showing date, city, country, venue and reason for cancellation or postponement
Date	City	Country	Venue	Reason/Additional Info
April 10, 2016	Greensboro	United States	Greensboro Coliseum	HB2 law in North Carolina
September 3, 2016	Virginia Beach	United States	Veterans United Home Loans Amphitheater	Postponed to September 5, 2016, due to inclement weather from Hurricane Hermine

== Songs performed ==
Originals/studio tracks/cover songs

Greetings from Asbury Park, N.J.

- "Blinded By the Light"
- "Does This Bus Stop at 82nd Street?"
- "For You" (solo piano)
- "Growin' Up"
- "It's Hard to Be a Saint in the City"
- "Lost in the Flood"
- "Spirit in the Night"

The Wild, the Innocent & the E Street Shuffle

- "4th of July, Asbury Park (Sandy)"
- "The E Street Shuffle"
- "Incident on 57th Street" (solo piano)
- "Kitty's Back"
- "New York City Serenade" (with string section)
- "Rosalita (Come Out Tonight)"

Born to Run

- "Backstreets"
- "Born to Run"
- "Jungleland"
- "Meeting Across the River"
- "Night"
- "She's the One"
- "Tenth Avenue Freeze-Out"
- "Thunder Road" (performed both with full band and solo acoustic)

Darkness on the Edge of Town

- "Adam Raised a Cain"
- "Badlands"
- "Candy's Room"
- "Darkness on the Edge of Town"
- "Factory"
- "The Promised Land" (performed both with full band and solo acoustic)
- "Prove It All Night" (performed both with and without 1978 intro)
- "Racing in the Street"
- "Streets of Fire"
- "Something in the Night"

The River

- "Cadillac Ranch"
- "Crush on You"
- "Drive All Night" (performed with and without "Dream Baby Dream" interlude)
- "Fade Away"
- "Hungry Heart"
- "I Wanna Marry You" (with "Here She Comes" intro)
- "I'm a Rocker"
- "Independence Day"
- "Jackson Cage"
- "Out in the Street"
- "Point Blank"
- "The Price You Pay"
- "Ramrod"
- "The River"
- "Sherry Darling"
- "Stolen Car"
- "The Ties That Bind"
- "Two Hearts"
- "Wreck on the Highway"
- "You Can Look (But You Better Not Touch)"

Nebraska

- "Atlantic City"
- "Johnny 99"
- "Mansion on the Hill"
- "Nebraska"
- "Reason to Believe"

Born in the U.S.A.

- "Bobby Jean"
- "Born in the U.S.A."
- "Cover Me"
- "Dancing in the Dark"
- "Darlington County"
- "Downbound Train
- "Glory Days"
- "I'm Goin' Down"
- "I'm on Fire"
- "My Hometown"
- "No Surrender"
- "Working on the Highway"

Tunnel of Love

- "Brilliant Disguise"
- "Tougher Than the Rest"
- "Tunnel of Love"

Human Touch

- "Human Touch"
- "Roll of the Dice"

Lucky Town

- "Better Days"
- "If I Should Fall Behind" (performed both with full band and solo acoustic)
- "Living Proof"
- "Lucky Town"
- "Leap Of Faith"

Greatest Hits

- "Blood Brothers"
- "Murder Incorporated"
- "Secret Garden"
- "Streets of Philadelphia"
- "This Hard Land" (solo acoustic)

The Ghost of Tom Joad

- "The Ghost of Tom Joad" (performed both with full band and solo acoustic)
- "Youngstown"

Tracks

- "Back in Your Arms"
- "Be True"
- "The Fever"
- "Frankie"
- "I Wanna Be With You"
- "Iceman"
- "Loose Ends"
- "My Love Will Not Let You Down"
- "Pink Cadillac"
- "Roulette"
- "Thundercrack"

The Rising

- "Into the Fire"
- "Lonesome Day"
- "Mary's Place"
- "My City of Ruins"
- "The Rising"
- "Waitin' on a Sunny Day"
- "You're Missing"

The Essential Bruce Springsteen

- "From Small Things (Big Things One Day Come)"
- "None But the Brave"

We Shall Overcome: The Seeger Sessions

- "Buffalo Gals" (partial performance in Buffalo, New York)

Magic

- "I'll Work for Your Love" (solo acoustic)
- "Long Walk Home" (solo acoustic)
- "Radio Nowhere"

Working on a Dream

- "My Lucky Day"
- "Working on a Dream"

The Promise

- "Because the Night"
- "Fire"
- "The Promise" (solo piano)
- "Rendezvous"
- "Save My Love"

Wrecking Ball

- "American Land"
- "Death to My Hometown"
- "Jack of All Trades" (with string section)
- "Land of Hope and Dreams"
- "Shackled and Drawn"
- "We Take Care of Our Own"
- "Wrecking Ball"

High Hopes

- "American Skin (41 Shots)"
- "Dream Baby Dream"

The Ties That Bind: The River Collection

- "Meet Me in the City"

Non-album/cover songs

- "Boom Boom" (John Lee Hooker cover)
- "Brown-Eyed Girl" (Van Morrison cover)
- "Detroit Medley"
- "Don't Hang Up" (The Orlons cover)
- "Follow That Dream" (Elvis Presley cover)
- "I Fought the Law" (The Bobby Fuller Four cover)
- "Jole Blon" (Harry Choates cover)
- "Jersey Girl" (Tom Waits cover)
- "La Bamba" (partial performance during "Twist and Shout") (Mexican folk song made popular by Ritchie Valens)
- "Light of Day"
- "Long Tall Sally" (Little Richard cover)
- "Lucille" (Little Richard cover)
- "Pretty Flamingo" (Manfred Mann cover)
- "Purple Rain" (tribute to Prince)
- "Rebel Rebel" (tribute to David Bowie)
- "Rockin' All Over the World" (John Fogerty cover)
- "Santa Claus Is Coming to Town" (Harry Reser and His Orchestra cover)
- "Seeds"
- "Seven Nights to Rock" (Moon Mullican cover)
- "Shout" (The Isley Brothers cover)
- "Summertime Blues" (Eddie Cochran cover)
- "Take It Easy" (solo acoustic) (Eagles cover; tribute to Glenn Frey)
- "Trapped" (Jimmy Cliff cover)
- "Travelin' Band" (Creedence Clearwater Revival cover)
- "Twist and Shout" (The Top Notes cover)
- "You Never Can Tell" (Chuck Berry cover)
- "Who'll Stop the Rain" (Creedence Clearwater Revival cover)

== Personnel ==
=== The E Street Band ===
- Bruce Springsteen – lead vocals, lead guitar, rhythm guitar, acoustic guitar, harmonica
- Roy Bittan – piano, synthesizer, accordion
- Nils Lofgren – rhythm guitar, lead guitar, pedal steel guitar, acoustic guitar, background vocals
- Patti Scialfa – background vocals, some duet vocals, acoustic guitar, tambourine (only appeared at selected shows throughout the tour)
- Garry Tallent – bass guitar, background vocals
- Steven Van Zandt – rhythm guitar, lead guitar, background vocals
- Max Weinberg – drums

with

- Jake Clemons – saxophone, percussion, background vocals
- Soozie Tyrell – violin, acoustic guitar, percussion, background vocals
- Charles Giordano – organ, accordion, electronic glockenspiel

and

- Sam Bardfeld string section – strings on "New York City Serenade" and "Jack of All Trades"

== Guest appearances ==
- Peter Wolf – provided vocals on "Shout" at shows in Boston on February 4, 2016, and Foxborough on September 14.
- Joe Grushecky and Johnny Grushecky – provided vocals on "Born to Run" during the show in Cleveland on February 23, 2016, and on "Light of Day" in Pittsburgh on September 11.
- Eddie Vedder – provided vocals on "Bobby Jean" in Seattle on March 24, 2016.
- Bob Seger – provided vocals on "Tenth Avenue Freeze-Out" and "Shout" during the show in Detroit on April 14, 2016.
- Bono – provided vocals on "Because the Night" during the show in Dublin on May 29, 2016.
- Elliott Murphy – played guitar on "Born to Run" in Paris on July 11, 2016.
- Tom Morello – played guitar on "Death to My Hometown", "American Skin (41 Shots)", "Badlands" and played guitar and provided co-lead vocals on "The Ghost of Tom Joad" during the show in East Rutherford on August 25, 2016.
- Rickie Lee Jones – provided vocals on "Spirit in the Night" in East Rutherford on August 30, 2016.
- Vini Lopez – performed "It's Hard to Be a Saint in the City" and "Spirit in the Night" in Philadelphia on September 9, 2016.
- Richie Sambora – performed on "Tenth Avenue Freeze-Out" and "Shout" in Adelaide on January 30, 2017

== Opening acts ==
- Counting Crows – (July 7, 2016)
- Jet – (Feb. 2, 2017; Feb. 11, 2017; Feb. 18, 2017; Feb. 21, 2017; Feb. 25, 2017)
- Diesel – (Feb. 11, 2017; Feb. 18, 2017)
- Marlon Williams and the Yarra Benders – (Feb. 21, 2017; Feb. 25, 2017)

== See also ==
- List of highest-grossing concert tours
