= Robbin Thompson =

American singer-songwriter (1949–2015)

- Born: Robert Wickens Thompson; June 16, 1949; Boston, Massachusetts, U.S.
- Died: October 10, 2015 (aged 66) Richmond, Virginia, U.S.
- Genre: Folk rock
- Occupation: Musician
- Instrument: Guitar
- Label: Out There Records
- Formerly of: Steel Mill
- Website: Official website

Robert Wickens "Robbin" Thompson (June 16, 1949 – October 10, 2015) was an American singer-songwriter based in Richmond, Virginia. Since 1976 he recorded several albums which included guest appearances by Melissa Manchester, Steve Cropper, Waddy Wachtel, Bruce Hornsby and Ellen McIlwaine, among others. He was a member of an early Bruce Springsteen band, Steel Mill, and co-wrote songs with Timothy B. Schmit, Phil Vassar and Butch Taylor and Carter Beauford of the Dave Matthews Band. He twice won the American Song Festival and in 1980 had a minor national hit with "Brite Eyes". He also wrote songs featured on the soundtracks of Gleaming the Cube and The Fighting Temptations. In March 2015, "Sweet Virginia Breeze", which Thompson co-wrote with Steve Bassett, became Virginia's second official state song (joining "Our Great Virginia").

== Career ==
=== Early years ===
Thompson was born in Boston, Massachusetts. From age seven he lived in Melbourne, Florida, where he graduated from Melbourne High School.

Between 1963-67 he was the lead singer and songwriter with several Florida-based bands including The Hanging Five, The Five Gents and The Tasmanians. The latter band even released a couple of singles in 1966. In 1968 he formed Transcontinental Mercy Flight before moving to Richmond, Virginia, initially to attend Virginia Commonwealth University. While at VCU he formed Mercy Flight in early 1969.

=== Steel Mill ===
On November 11, 1969, Mercy Flight opened for Steel Mill when they played a concert at VCU. Throughout early 1970 Mercy Flight continued to open regularly for Steel Mill and when Bruce Springsteen decided to add another vocalist he recruited Thompson. He made his debut with Steel Mill on August 29, 1970 at the 3rd Annual Nashville Music Festival, sponsored by WMAC.

Steel Mill was one of about twenty different acts to take part. Headliners included Roy Orbison, Brian Hyland, Ronnie Milsap, Bobby Bloom, Ballin' Jack, Ten Wheel Drive and The Illusion. During Thompson's time with Steel Mill they also opened for, among others, Ike & Tina Turner, Cactus and Black Sabbath. While Springsteen was Steel Mill's main songwriter, the band performed some Thompson songs, including "Train Ride". Thompson would release his own version of this song as a B-side in 1982 and then on a 1999 re-issue of Two B's Please. Steel Mill played their final show on January 23, 1971 at The Upstage Club in Asbury Park, New Jersey. While Thompson went on to establish his own career, the remaining members of the band – Vini Lopez, Danny Federici and Steve Van Zandt – would continue to play with Springsteen and eventually evolved into the E Street Band.

After the breakup of Steel Mill, Thompson and Springsteen occasionally guested at each other's concerts. On August 6, 1981 at the Bayou Club in Washington D.C., Thompson was joined onstage by Springsteen, Garry Tallent and Clarence Clemons for an eight-minute version of "Carol".

On March 3, 2003 at the Richmond Coliseum during The Rising Tour, Thompson, together with Bruce Hornsby, joined Springsteen on stage for the Hank Ballard song "Let's Go, Let's Go, Let's Go". According to Thompson they were going to try and perform a version of "He's Guilty (Send That Boy To Jail)", a Steel Mill-era song that Thompson had recorded. However, apparently nobody in the E Street Band could remember how it went.

=== Recording career ===
In 1976, Thompson launched his solo career with the release of an eponymous album on Nemperor Records. Among the album's highlights was the American Song Festival winner "Boy From Boston". The album featured guest appearances by Timothy B. Schmit, Melissa Manchester, Steve Cropper, Waddy Wachtel and Rick Roberts. Schmit would go on to provide harmony vocals on several of Thompson's albums. They co-wrote "Find Out in Time", which was recorded by Schmit with Poco on their 1977 album, Indian Summer. In 1978 Thompson released Together, a collaboration with another Richmond-based songwriter, Steve Bassett. Among the songs they co-wrote and recorded for this album was an early version of "Sweet Virginia Breeze".

Thompson had some commercial success with Two B's Please, released in 1980 and credited to The Robbin Thompson Band. Background vocals on the majority of the album were provided by Schmit and Roberts. The album would eventually sell 200,000 copies and included a re-recorded version of "Sweet Virginia Breeze" as well as "Candy Apple Red" and "Brite Eyes". All three songs were hits in the Southeastern United States. The latter song was also a minor national hit and spent nine weeks on the Billboard charts, peaking at No. 66. It spent six weeks on the Cash Box chart, reaching No. 78. The album included "Even Cowgirls Get the Blues", which was originally intended to be the theme song for a film based on the Tom Robbins novel of the same name. However, when a film was eventually made the song was not featured.

Thompson's 1985 album Better Late Than Never, which featured cover versions of "Fortunate Son" and "Be My Baby", was his first to be released on his own label Out There Records. It also included "Guilty", Thompson's version of "He's Guilty (Send That Boy To Jail)", originally written by Bruce Springsteen for Steel Mill. In 1997 this song was also included on the compilation One Step Up/Two Steps Back: The Songs Of Bruce Springsteen. Another highlight was "You're My Obsession" which was an American Song Festival winner in 1984. In 1988 Thompson released Since Grade School: A Robbin Thompson Anthology, which combined five new songs with eleven songs from his first four albums. Among the new songs was the title song for the film Gleaming the Cube. I Don't Need A Reason To Ride from 1991 featured Bruce Hornsby while Out on the Chesapeake from 1998 was the first of several collaborations with Butch Taylor of the Dave Matthews Band and saw Schmit once again provide backing vocals. In between Thompson was also involved in a collaboration with fellow songwriters Michael Lille and Lewis McGehee, recording an eponymous album as The Famous Unknowns.

In 2002 a second collection, The Vinyl Years, was basically a reissue of Robbin Thompson plus later songs such as the original version of "Sweet Virginia Breeze" and a reissue of "Guilty". His 2003 album, One Step Ahead of the Blues, again featured Schmit and Taylor, as well a song called "Orange Moon" that was recorded in Shanghai with traditional Chinese musical instruments. It included another Springsteen/Steel Mill song, "The Train Song". Live in Studio A was recorded at the in Your Ear Studios in Richmond, Virginia with an invited audience of eighty people over two nights. It features thirteen live tracks and stories about how some of the songs were written. Just A Blur in the Rearview featured a guest appearances by Ellen McIlwaine. The title song was co-written with Phil Vassar while "I Won't Quit" was co-written and recorded with Carter Beauford and Butch Taylor of the Dave Matthews Band. It was also featured on the soundtrack of The Fighting Temptations.

In early 2008, Thompson's Move on Down the Line won in The 7th Annual Independent Music Awards for Gospel Song.

=== Death ===
Thompson was first diagnosed with cancer in 2000 but survived until October 10, 2015, finally succumbing at age 66 after a long battle with a rare gastrointestinal stromal tumor.

== Discography ==
=== Albums ===
- solo:
  - Robbin Thompson (1976, Nemperor 440 0698)
  - Better Late Than Never (1985, Out There Records 585)
  - Since Grade School: A Robbin Thompson Anthology (1988, Out There Records 1188)
  - I Don't Need a Reason to Ride (1991, Out There Records 6591)
  - Out on the Chesapeake (1998, Out There Records 0898)
  - The Vinyl Years (2002, Out There Records)
  - One Step Ahead of the Blues (2003, Out There Records 31003)
  - Live in Studio A (2006, Out There Records 92305)
  - Just a Blur in the Rearview (2007, Out There Records 2207)
  - A Real Fine Day (2013, Out There Records)
- Robbin Thompson and Steve Bassett
  - Together (1978, Richmond Records 1001)
- The Robbin Thompson Band
  - Two B's Please (1980, Ovation 1759)
  - Live at the National (2010, Out There Records)
- The Famous Unknowns (with Michael Lille and Lewis McGehee)
  - The Famous Unknowns (1994, Out There Records 33194)

=== Singles ===
  - "Boy from Boston/Another Cup of Coffee and a Cigarette" (1976, Nemperor Records 010)
  - "Boy from Boston (mono)/Boy from Boston (stereo)" (1976, Nemperor Records 010)
  - "Dream On Melinda/It's My Turn" (1976, Nemperor Records 011)
  - "Dream On Melinda (mono)/Dream On Melinda (stereo)" (1976, Nemperor Records 011)
- The Tasmanians
  - "Baby/Love, Love, Love" (1966, Conda Records 101)
  - "I Can't Explain This Feeling/If I Don't" (1966, Power Records 4933)
- Robbin'
  - "What Am I Gonna Do?/Changes" (1972, Colpar Records 1007S)
- Robbin Thompson and Steve Bassett
  - "Sweet Virginia Breeze/Virginia in the Springtime" (1978, Richmond Records 1002)
  - "Looking for a Sunny Day/Let's Do One Together" (1978, Richmond Records 1003)
  - "Sweet Virginia Breeze/Virginia Is for Lovers" (1986, Virginia Is for Lovers 605061XA)
- The Robbin Thompson Band
  - "Brite Eyes/That's Alright" (1980, Ovation Records 1157)
  - "Candy Apple Red/Barroom Romance" (1980, Richmond Records 500)
  - "Movin' On Up/Train Ride" (1982, Short Pump Records RR502)

=== Album appearances ===
  - "Guilty" on One Step Up/Two Steps Back: The Songs of Bruce Springsteen (1997, Capitol Records)
  - "Wouldn't Want to Be You" on United We Stand (2001, Capitol Records)
