= Wreck on the Highway (Bruce Springsteen song) =

1980 song by Bruce Springsteen

Song by Bruce Springsteen

from the album The River
- B-side: "Cadillac Ranch"
- Released: October 1980
- Recorded: March–April 1980
- Studio: Power Station, New York City
- Genre: Rock
- Length: 3:54
- Label: Columbia Records
- Songwriter: Bruce Springsteen
- Producers: Jon Landau, Bruce Springsteen, Steven Van Zandt

"Wreck on the Highway" is a song written and performed by the American singer-songwriter Bruce Springsteen. It was originally released as the final track on his fifth album, The River. The version released on The River was recorded at The Power Station in New York in March–April 1980. As well as being the last track on The River, it was the last song recorded for the album.

A melancholic song with a false ending, "Wreck on the Highway" features prominent organ and acoustic guitar parts. The song is structured as a folk ballad with four verses of five lines each. The rhyme scheme of the verse endings is generally ABCCB, but this is not followed absolutely strictly. The lyrics describe a man who witnesses a hit-and-run auto accident on a rainy, isolated highway, and is subsequently haunted by the vision and unable to sleep. After the first three verses focus on the specific incident, the last verse broadens the theme to encompass more universal themes of life and death. The singer thinks about the life that was lost, and the people who may have loved him, and he knows he will be haunted by the incident for the rest of his life. Springsteen has explained the theme by stating that after seeing the crash, the singer "realizes that you have a limited number of opportunities to love someone, to do your work, to be part of something, to parent your children, to do something good." It is directly inspired by Roy Acuff's country song of the same name and similar theme from the 1940s, which is a cover version of the 1938 recorded song, "I Didn't Hear Nobody Pray", by the Dixon Brothers. While Springsteen's song has elements of a country arrangement, its music is more haunting and less sentimental.

Along with the title track, "Independence Day" and "Point Blank", it is one of the verse-chorus songs on The River that was essentially a short story or character sketch. "Wreck on the Highway" and a few other songs on The River, such as the title track and "Stolen Car", mark a new direction in Bruce Springsteen's songwriting: these ballads imbued with a sense of hopelessness anticipate his next album, Nebraska, as well as a turn towards pessimism in his overall artistic and personal world-view. Springsteen himself has noted that "Wreck on the Highway" is one of the songs reflecting a shift in his songwriting style, linking The River to Nebraska.

A slow-tempo song, "Wreck on the Highway" has not been particularly common in concert, with about 100 performances in Bruce Springsteen concerts through 2008. Nearly all of those performances occurred during the 1980–1981 River Tour. The song was revived occasionally for electric piano performances on the 2005 solo Devils & Dust Tour. Naturally, the song was played every night during the 2016 "River Tour" during which the entire album was played at the outset of each show.

In the UK, it was released as the B-side of the single "Cadillac Ranch".

== Literary reception ==
Author Patrick Humphries describes the song as distilling "the essence of what makes Bruce Springsteen great: a looping, loping and involving melody, heartfelt vocal and acutely visual lyrics." June Skinner Sawyers describes it as "a perfect song, a masterpiece in miniature, and a haunting meditation on mortality and what it means to be alive." Music critic Clinton Heylin described the version that was released on the album as a "near-cataleptic coda to 'Drive All Night,'" the previous song on the album, although Heylin felt that an earlier version of the song, with a faster, "countrabilly" arrangement, was more interesting. Heylin also described the song as Springsteen's "semi-ironic farewell to albums about cars and girls." Music critic Dave Marsh describes the song as an appropriate closer for The River as it "pares down the situation from 'Drive All Night'" of the singer and his lover trying to ignore the distractions around them down "to one man facing the world again." To Marsh, the singer in "Wreck on the Highway" may well have been the hero from other songs on The River such as "Ramrod," "Cadillac Ranch," "The River" or "Stolen Car," or even the heroes from earlier Springsteen albums such as Born to Run and Darkness on the Edge of Town, but regardless Marsh feels that "he sees and speaks and sings for all of them."

== Personnel ==
According to authors Philippe Margotin and Jean-Michel Guesdon:

- Bruce Springsteen – vocals, guitars
- Roy Bittan – piano
- Clarence Clemons – tambourine
- Danny Federici – organ
- Garry Tallent – bass
- Steven Van Zandt – guitars
- Max Weinberg – drums
