= Delores Holmes =

American singer (1946–2010)

- Born: Delores Holmes; July 18, 1946
- Origin: Matawan, New Jersey
- Died: April 16, 2010 (aged 63)
- Genres: R&B; Soul; Rock and roll
- Occupations: Backing vocalist singer
- Instrument: Vocals

Delores Holmes (July 18, 1946 – April 16, 2010) was an American soul singer. She was best known for her years as backup singer for the Bruce Springsteen Band during 1969 to 1972, the last grouping before the E Street Band. The Bruce Springsteen Band included David Sancious, Vini Lopez, Garry Tallent and Steven Van Zandt, among others.

== Biography ==
From Matawan, New Jersey, Holmes grew up singing in a gospel family. Later the Jersey Shore singer performed with choirs and girl groups. In the 1960s and the 1970s, she performed with a number of rock bands, including Hot Ice, with fellow Springsteen back-up singer Barbara Dinkins. She sang with a number of Shore bands and was also a member of Gabrielle Roth's group, The Mirrors, for several years. Holmes also recorded or performed backgrounds for many artists and producers, including Garry Tallent, Danny Federici, Bill Chinnock, Neal Coty, Steve Delopoulos of Burlap to Cashmere and Fernando Saunders of Lou Reed's Band.

Holmes auditioned for the Bruce Springsteen Band through a newspaper advertisement asking for singers with a "gospel sound". She spent several years performing and touring the Eastern Seaboard with the band, including a concert at the University of Virginia, and the Jersey Shore's own Brookdale College, The Student Prince, Sunshine Inn, among others.

In 2001, she appeared on the internationally televised Tribute to Heroes 9/11 telethon as a backup singer for Springsteen with Clarence Clemons, Little Steven, Patti Scialfa, Soozie Tyrell and Lisa Lowell. She would later perform at New York's Beacon Theatre with Phoebe Snow, Beth Nielsen Chapman, and Bar Scott in a concert to honor rescue workers.

Holmes formed a soul music trio with her daughter, Layonne Holmes, and Debbie Vaughn called Rain, while continuing to perform and record with local bands. She was also a member of Holiday Express, a charity group of local New Jersey shore musicians and volunteers.
