= Flemington =

Flemington may refer to:

== Places ==
=== Australia ===
- Flemington, New South Wales, a suburb of Sydney, also known as “Homebush West”
  - Sydney Markets, market complex commonly known as Flemington Markets
  - Flemington railway station, Sydney
- Flemington, Victoria, a suburb of Melbourne
  - Flemington Racecourse, home of the Melbourne Cup
  - Electoral district of Essendon and Flemington
  - Electoral district of Flemington

=== New Zealand ===
- Flemington, Canterbury
- Flemington, Hawke's Bay

=== United Kingdom ===
- Flemington, South Lanarkshire, Scotland

=== United States ===
- Flemington, Florida
- Flemington, Georgia
- Flemington, Missouri
- Flemington, New Jersey
- Flemington, Pennsylvania
- Flemington, West Virginia

== Music ==
- Flemington (album), by Danny Federici
