= Big Man's West =

Coordinates: 40.3487°N 74.0716°W

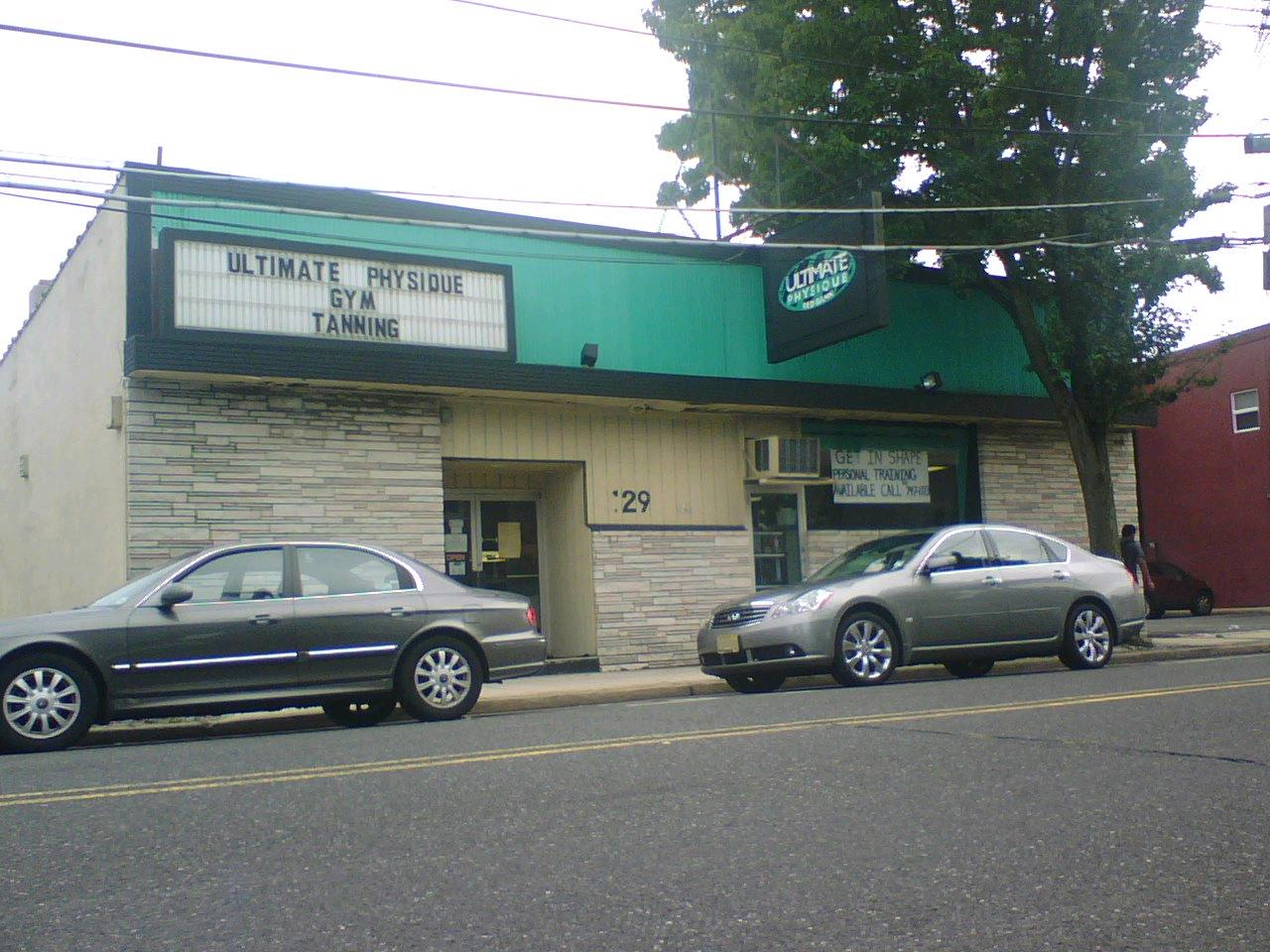
- Interactive map of Big Man's West
- Location: Red Bank, New Jersey
- Owner: Clarence Clemons
- Type: Night club
- Event: Rock

Construction
- Opened: 1981
- Closed: 1983

Big Man's West was a nightclub at 129 Monmouth Street in Red Bank, New Jersey. It was owned by Clarence "Big Man" Clemons of Bruce Springsteen's E Street Band and managed by Terry Magovern and George McMorrow. Although the club operated only from 1981 to 1983, it helped revive the Jersey Shore music scene during the early 1980s, along with The Fast Lane and The Stone Pony.

The club opened on July 11, 1981, with a set by Nemperor recording artists and local band The Proof, They were followed by its house band, Clarence Clemons & The Red Bank Rockers. They were joined on stage by Springsteen and Gary U.S. Bonds for a set that included "Ramrod", "Around and Around", "Summertime Blues", "Jole Blon", "You Can't Sit Down" and "Cadillac Ranch". Springsteen made at least 18 guest appearances at the club; in 1982 alone, he performed there with Junior Walker & The Allstars, Beaver Brown, John Eddie & The Front Street Runners, Southside Johnny, Sonny Kenn, Bill Chinnock, Iron City Houserockers and Dave Edmunds. Other acts that performed at the club included Joan Jett, Steve Forbert, Jon Bon Jovi, Bonnie Raitt and Little Steven & The Disciples of Soul The club also feature popular Jersey Shore acts such as The Midnight Thunder Band fronted by Jobonanno, The Jim Davison Band, The George Theiss Band and The Diamonds. Theiss was a former member of The Castiles, one of Bruce Springsteen’s earliest bands. The Diamonds, featuring former members of Cats On A Smooth Surface, made their debut opening for Little Steven at Big Man's West on December 16, 1982.

Clemons closed the club on January 8, 1983, citing health and safety regulations and financial difficulties. On the final night, Clemons, Springsteen, Max Weinberg, and Garry Tallent joined Larson to play "Rockin' All Over the World" and "Lucille". In May 1984, Springsteen and the E Street Band, with new recruit Nils Lofgren, used the now-defunct club to rehearse for the Born in the U.S.A. Tour.
