= Point Blank (Bruce Springsteen song) =

1981 single by Bruce Springsteen

Single by Bruce Springsteen

from the album The River
- B-side: "Ramrod"
- Released: 1981
- Recorded: August 25, 1979
- Studio: Power Station, New York City
- Genre: Rock
- Length: 6:06
- Label: Columbia
- Songwriter: Bruce Springsteen
- Producers: Bruce Springsteen, Jon Landau, Steven Van Zandt

Bruce Springsteen singles chronology
"Cadillac Ranch" (1981)	"Point Blank" (1981)	"Atlantic City" (1982)

"Point Blank" is a song written by Bruce Springsteen and first released on Springsteen's 1980 album The River. In Europe, it was also released as a single in 1981, backed by another song from The River, "Ramrod". Although it was not released as a single in the US, it did reach #20 on the Billboard Mainstream Rock Tracks chart.

== Lyrics and music ==
"Point Blank" is recorded in the key of B minor with a soft rock tempo of 116 beats per minute with Springsteen's vocals ranging from B3 to A5, while the song follows a chord progression of Bm-G-A-F♯m-F♯7. The song was written in 1978, and was the first song Springsteen wrote after completing the Darkness on the Edge of Town album. "Point Blank" had its live premiere on July 7, 1978, in a concert on the Darkness Tour at the Roxy Theatre in West Hollywood, California, at which "Independence Day" was also premiered. In its 1978 incarnation, the lyrics dealt with the singer's girlfriend's drug addiction. A live 1978 performance from Houston, Texas is included on a DVD in The Promise box set. After several lyrical revisions, Point Blank was recorded on August 23–25, 1979 at the Power Station recording studio, New York City, New York.

In 2015, Springsteen stated that he regards "Point Blank", "Stolen Car", "Independence Day", and the title track as being "the heart and soul" of The River album. "Point Blank", along with the title track, "Wreck on the Highway", and "Independence Day", is one of the verse-chorus songs on The River that was essentially a short story or character sketch. As with "The River" and "Independence Day", this song deals with the disappointments of working-class family life. The emotions covered by the song include disappointment, fear, loneliness and desperation. With The River, Springsteen created an album on which happy songs like "Sherry Darling" could co-exist with painful songs like "Point Blank".

"Point Blank" is also one of several songs on the album dealing with the conflict between dreams and reality. The singer dreams that he is still with his former girlfriend and they are dancing together. But waking up, he realizes he saw the girlfriend standing in the doorway trying to stay out of the rain, looking "like just another stranger waitin' to get blown away." The ex-girlfriend is the subject of the song's narrative. She grew up fast, but rather than getting the life she wanted, she ended up on welfare. The singer sings that:

I was gonna be your Romeo you were gonna be my Juliet
These days you don't wait on Romeos
You wait on that welfare check

This was the third reference to a Romeo in a Springsteen-penned song, earlier ones being "Incident on 57th Street" from the 1973 album The Wild, the Innocent & the E Street Shuffle, and "Fire", which was covered by Robert Gordon in 1978.

== Themes ==
Author Rob Kirkpatrick describes the theme of the "Point Blank" as "you're born dying." Jeffrey Symynkywicz described the theme as being that "there is an inexorable decline that is carved at the heart of life." Springsteen has stated that one of the themes of the song is the fact that if you ease up as you get older, you effectively cease to exist. When introducing the song at a 1981 concert, Springsteen stated:

A song ain't no good until somebody hears it. By yourself you can't have an effect. You have to reach out. This is a song about someone who loses that power, which is the most powerful thing in the world – your ability to affect your friends' lives ... and my life ... and maybe I can do somethin' for you. So ... this is called "Point Blank."

There are at least two theories as to the origin of the title. One theory is that it comes from the 1967 Lee Marvin movie Point Blank. Another is that it came from a comment made by an ex-girlfriend during the heat of an argument.

== Critical reception ==
Rolling Stone Magazine critic Dave Marsh described the song as "portentous." Author June Skinner Sawyers described the song as "a song of shadows, of lives going nowhere, of broken relationships, and broken promises."

== Personnel ==
According to authors Philippe Margotin and Jean-Michel Guesdon:

- Bruce Springsteen – vocals, guitars
- Roy Bittan – piano
- Clarence Clemons – triangle, guiro
- Danny Federici – organ
- Garry Tallent – bass
- Steven Van Zandt – guitars, vocal harmonies
- Max Weinberg – drums
