= Live Collection =

EP by Bruce Springsteen
- Released: 1987
- Recorded: July 1978 – December 1980
- Genre: Rock
- Length: 28:05
- Label: CBS Records, Sony
- Producer: Jon Landau, Chuck Plotkin

Bruce Springsteen chronology
Live/1975-85 (1986)	Live Collection (1987)	Tunnel of Love (1987)

Live Collection is a Japanese 1987 four song live Bruce Springsteen EP. The EP features two tracks that did not make it into the Live/1975-85 collection: "For You" and "Incident on 57th Street". The River Tour performance of "Incident on 57th Street" released on this EP was the song's last outing until their 1999 reunion tour and has helped make this song a live favorite. The original LP included a fold-out color poster, and lyric sheet with the lyrics to all four tracks in English, and Japanese. The album has since been re-released starting in 2001.

== Track listing ==
Side one
No.	Title	Date and place	Length
1.	"Rosalita (Come Out Tonight)"	July 7, 1978, The Roxy Theatre	9:57
2.	"Fire"	December 16, 1978, Winterland Ballroom	2:56

Side two
No.	Title	Date and place	Length
3.	"Incident on 57th Street"	December 29, 1980, Nassau Veterans Memorial Coliseum	10:00
4.	"For You"	July 7, 1978, The Roxy Theatre	5:06

== Personnel ==
The E Street Band

- Roy Bittan – synthesizer, piano
- Clarence Clemons – saxophone, percussion
- Danny Federici – organ
- Steve Van Zandt – guitar
- Bruce Springsteen – lead vocals, guitar, harmonica
- Garry Tallent – bass guitar
- Max Weinberg – drums
