= Bill Chinnock =

American singer and songwriter

- Born: William Chinnock; November 12, 1947; Newark, New Jersey, US
- Died: March 7, 2007 (aged 59) Yarmouth, Maine, US
- Genres: Blues; Rock; Country
- Instruments: Vocals; Guitar; Harmonica; Keyboards
- Years active: 1967–2007
- Labels: Paramount Records; Atlantic Records; Rounder Records; Epic Records; East Coast Records
- Formerly of: E Street Band; Roberta Flack
- Spouse: Terry Curless
- Website: www.billchinnock.com

William Chinnock (November 12, 1947 – March 7, 2007), also referred to as Bill Chinnock or Billy Chinnock, was an American singer-songwriter and guitarist. Born in Newark, New Jersey, Chinnock grew up in the nearby Essex County communities of East Orange and Millburn. He was a prominent member of the Jersey Shore music scene during the late 1960s, leading bands that included future members of the E Street Band.

He subsequently moved away from the Shore and spent time in New York City and Nashville, Tennessee, before eventually settling in Yarmouth, Maine. In 1987 he won an Emmy Award after his song "Somewhere in the Night" was used as the theme on Search for Tomorrow. "Hold On To Love", a duet he recorded with Roberta Flack, was also featured as a theme song on Guiding Light.

== Jersey Shore bandleader ==
In 1967 Chinnock was living in Millburn, NJ and leading a band called The Storytellers which also featured Jim Meltzer (lead vocals), Bill Wolf (bass) and Chip Gallagher (drums). They later recruited Danny Federici (keyboards) and Vini Lopez also auditioned to join this band. The Storytellers released a single, "Cry With Me" / Little Boy Sad", on Kama Sutra Records which was a hit on the Jersey Shore. It led to regular gigs at the Hullabaloo clubs in Freehold, Middletown and Asbury Park and local TV appearances. Next Chinnock led the Downtown Tangiers Band which also featured Federici, Lopez and Wendell John (bass). In 1968 they recorded an album with Koppelman & Rubin Records but the producer allegedly disappeared with the recordings and it remains unreleased. Among the songs believed to be recorded were Chinnock originals "Snake Bite", "Burn Baby Burn" and "Crown Liquor". They also played the Electric Circus and toured with the Joshua Light Show. Towards the end of the band's lifetime Johns was replaced by Garry Tallent but the band broke up when Chinnock briefly moved to Maine. Federici and Lopez subsequently formed Steel Mill with Bruce Springsteen and Vinnie Roslin. Among the songs Steel Mill played in concert was Chinnock's "Crown Liquor". By 1969 Chinnock had returned from Maine and formed a new band, Glory Road, with Tallent, Bobby Williams (drums) and Danny Mansolino (keyboards). On June 21, 1970, they played at the Clearwater Swim Club in Atlantic Highlands, New Jersey, opening for Steel Mill. Mansolino was later replaced in the band by a young David Sancious but they eventually broke up after Chinnock got hepatitis and mono. He was confined to bed for eight months and nearly died. Meanwhile, Tallent and Sancious, together with Lopez and Federici, went on to play together in several short lived bands based out of The Upstage in Asbury Park, New Jersey. They included Bruce Springsteen & The Friendly Enemies, The Sundance Blues Band, Dr. Zoom & The Sonic Boom and The Bruce Springsteen Band. These bands would eventually evolve into the E Street Band. Although Chinnock later moved away from the Shore, he would return to play there regularly throughout his recording career, appearing at The Stone Pony and The Fast Lane. On June 26, 1982, while playing at Big Man's West he was joined onstage by Springsteen for a rendition of "Lucille".

== Recording career ==
After recovering from illness, Chinnock left the Jersey Shore and briefly moved to New York City before settling in Maine. He was eventually signed to Paramount Records on the recommendation of John H. Hammond. Hammond had earlier signed Bruce Springsteen to Columbia Records. He released his debut album Bill Chinnock Blues in 1975. He also recorded a second album, Road Master, with Paramount that was produced by Tom Dowd, which to date remains unreleased. In 1976 he released an EP, Alive At The Loft, on the North Country label. In 1977 Chinnock released Badlands, his third full-length LP, on his own label, North Country Records. The album featured performances from Vini Lopez, Randy Brecker, Michael Brecker, and a young Irene Cara providing some backing vocals. Shortly after its release, Chinnock ignited a battle between several major record labels looking to sign him. After signing with Atlantic Records, the label insisted on remixing the album, adding strings, additional studio musicians, and backing vocalists. Many fans were disappointed with Atlantic's "sweetening" of the "raw and gutsy" sound that made the original so special. Unfortunately for Chinnock, the album's major-label re-release coincided with the release of Bruce Springsteen's hit album Darkness on the Edge of Town, which also featured a song called "Badlands", which negatively impacted the reception of Chinnock's album. The original 1977 mix of the album was reissued on remastered CD form for the first time since its initial release in 2019. His 1980 album Dime Store Heroes was released on the Atlantic, North Country and Rounder Records labels and saw him work with, among others, David Sanborn, Howie Wyeth, Will Lee, Tony Levin and Andy Newmark.

During the early 1980s Chinnock moved to Nashville, Tennessee to work with producer Harold Bradley who subsequently produced his next two albums. Originally released by a Nashville-based label, Alliance Records, his 1985 Rock & Roll Cowboys was subsequently re-mixed and re-released by Epic Records. Among the guest musicians was Max Weinberg. The 1987 Epic release Learning To Survive In The Modern Age produced a minor hit single with "Somewhere In The Night". The song was also used as the theme song for the soap Search for Tomorrow, resulting in Chinnock winning an Emmy Award in 1987. Despite this Chinnock subsequently found himself dropped by Epic and his next album, Thunder In The Valley saw him return to Atlantic. The 1990 album was credited to Billy & The American Suns, a group that included Craig Krampf (drums), Steve Hill (bass), Rex Stemn (guitar) and Clayton Ivy (piano). Like his two previous albums, it was recorded in Nashville. The song "Just Another Falling Star" was originally performed by Chinnock with the Downtown Tangiers Band.

In 1991 Chinnock returned to Maine and the following year released Out On The Borderline on his own label, East Coast Records. Among the guest musicians was Michael Hossack of The Doobie Brothers who also co-wrote the song "Take This Heart of Mine". In 1988 Backstreets, a Springsteen fanzine, reported that Chinnock had actually joined the Doobie Brothers as a replacement for Michael McDonald ! In 1992 Chinnock, Danny Federici and Garry Tallent also attempted to revive the Downtown Tangiers Band and recorded some sessions but nothing has been released to date. Chinnock's final album Livin' In The Promised Land was released in 2003 again on East Coast Records. One of Chinnock last recording's was "No Christmas in New Orleans", a re-working of Phil Ochs' "No Christmas in Kentucky", recorded in 2005 in aid of Hurricane Katrina victims.

== Later years ==
Towards the end of his life Chinnock believed that he suffered from chronic Lyme disease, a diagnosis not supported by mainstream doctors.

On March 7, 2007, it was reported that Chinnock had died. His manager, Paul Pappas, later told WCSH-TV that Chinnock had committed suicide.

Chinnock was survived by his wife, Terry, and sons William and John. His mother, who lived with Chinnock, had died ten days before.

In April 2010, a remastered version of Dime Store Heroes CD was released. The CD contained four never before released live tracks from Chinnock's 2003 concert at The Stone Pony. It also contained a limited edition DVD career retrospective. Two CD release concerts were held, one in March 2010 at the Stone Pony and the other in April 2010 in Portland, Maine to celebrate the life and music of Bill Chinnock.

== Discography ==
- Bill Chinnock
  - Bill Chinnock Blues (1974)
  - Road Master (1975 - Unreleased)
  - Alive at the Loft (EP) (1976)
  - Badlands (1977 - Reissued 1978)
  - Dime Store Heroes (1980)
  - Rock & Roll Cowboys (1985)
  - Learning to Survive in the Modern Age (1987)
  - Out on the Borderline (1992)
  - Livin in the Promised Land (2003)
- Billy & the American Suns
  - Thunder in the Valley (1990)
- The Storytellers
  - "Cry to Me" / "Little Boy Sad" (1968)
