= Wesley Asbury Wilkerson =

Wesley Asbury Wilkerson (February 13, 1844 - August 8, 1915) was a teacher, Baptist minister, justice of the peace, and state legislator. He served in the Florida House of Representatives in 1881, 1883, and 1885.

The Home Mission Society documented his work in an 1889 report. It listed statistics on his and other Baptist leaders sermons preached, meetings held, literature distributed and other church work. His field is described as "Colored People".

He attended the February 5, 1884 State Conference of Colored Men of Florida in Gainesville.

In 1903, the Ocala Evening Star noted he and his wife were in Ocala from Flemington, Florida.

== See also ==
- African American officeholders from the end of the Civil War until before 1900
