= Independence Day (Bruce Springsteen song) =

Promotional single by Bruce Springsteen

from the album The River
- A-side: "The River"
- Released: May 1981
- Recorded: April 24–25, 1980
- Studio: Power Station, New York City
- Length: 4:50
- Label: Columbia Records
- Songwriter(s): Bruce Springsteen
- Producer(s): Jon Landau, Bruce Springsteen, Steven Van Zandt

"Independence Day" is a song written and performed by the American singer-songwriter Bruce Springsteen. It was originally released on his fifth album, The River, in 1980. It was recorded at The Power Station in New York, on April 24–25, 1980.

== Content ==
In 2015, Springsteen stated that he regards "Independence Day," "Point Blank," "Stolen Car" and the title track as being "the heart and soul" of The River album. "Independence Day", along with the title track, "Wreck on the Highway" and "Point Blank", is one of the verse-chorus songs on The River that was essentially a short story or character sketch. It is one of the darker hued songs on The River. The lyrics are about a home that can no longer hold both father and son. The song is sung by the son to the father, opening with the line "Papa go to bed now, it's getting late", reversing the usual command of a father to a son. The son recognizes that despite their similarities, the father and son would never agree but just continue to argue constantly, and so it was time for the son to leave home. AllMusic critic William Ruhlmann said "Independence Day is an unusually sad, beautiful and private song, with a slow piano and a languid saxophone solo, as well as delicate organ and acoustic guitar work". The song has been described as Springsteen's best recorded vocal, with an unerring sincerity which fuels the song.

Although released on The River in 1980, "Independence Day" was written in 1977 and was originally played in the Darkness on the Edge of Town tour. "Independence Day" has been a reasonably popular concert song, with 199 performances through 2015. A concert version of "Independence Day" was released on the live album Live/1975–85.

"Independence Day" was released as the B-side on the single release of "The River" in several countries and as the B-side of "Sherry Darling" in others.

== Personnel ==
According to authors Philippe Margotin and Jean-Michel Guesdon:

- Bruce Springsteen – vocals, guitars
- Roy Bittan – piano
- Clarence Clemons – saxophone, tambourine
- Danny Federici – organ
- Garry Tallent – bass
- Steven Van Zandt – guitars
- Max Weinberg – drums
