= The River (Bruce Springsteen song) =

- European single picture sleeve

Single by Bruce Springsteen

from the album The River
- B-side: "Independence Day" (UK); "Ramrod" (France); "I'm a Rocker" (AUS)
- Released: April 1981
- Recorded: August 26 & 29, 1979
- Studio: Power Station, New York City
- Genre: Folk rock; heartland rock; soft rock; Americana
- Length: 4:59
- Label: Columbia
- Songwriter: Bruce Springsteen
- Producers: Jon Landau; Bruce Springsteen; Steven Van Zandt

Bruce Springsteen UK singles chronology
"Sherry Darling" (1980)	"The River" (1981)	"Cadillac Ranch" (1981)

"The River" is a song written and recorded by Bruce Springsteen, accompanied by the E Street Band, in 1979. The title track of his fifth album, it was a hit single in parts of Europe in 1981; reaching No.24 in Ireland, No. 25 in the Netherlands, and the top 10 in both Sweden and Norway. Its B-side was either "Independence Day" or "Ramrod", depending on the country of release.

== Composition ==
"The River" was originally intended to be included on an earlier, one-record version of The River, tentatively called The Ties That Bind. The song itself was recorded at The Power Station in New York City on August 26 and 29, 1979. In the first live performance of the song in 1979, Springsteen cited the inspiration as "my brother-in-law and my sister". The 2012 biography Bruce by Peter Ames Carlin includes an interview with Springsteen's sister Ginny, in which she plainly states that the song is a precise description of her early life with her husband Mickey, to whom she is still married. In his 2016 autobiography Springsteen confirmed that he wrote the song as a tribute to his sister and his brother-in-law.

"The River" makes use of a haunting harmonica part, and in some ways is a foreshadowing of the style of his next album, Nebraska. The imagery of the chorus and the end of the song were inspired by lines from Hank Williams' 1950 hit "Long Gone Lonesome Blues". The song's depiction of how economic difficulties are interlaced with local culture also presaged the 1980s popularity of heartland rock:

I come from down in the valley,
Where mister when you're young –
They bring you up to do, like your daddy done

I got a job working construction, for the Johnstown Company
But lately there ain't been much work, on account of the economy
Now all them things that seemed so important –
Well mister, they vanished right into the air

Writer Robert Hilburn described the song as "a classic outline of someone who has to re-adjust his dreams quickly [, facing] life as it is, not a world of his imagination."

In 2015, Springsteen stated that he regards "The River", "Point Blank", "Independence Day" and "Stolen Car" as being "the heart and soul" of The River album. "The River", and a few other songs on the album such as "Wreck on the Highway" and "Stolen Car", are said to mark a new direction in his songwriting: these ballads imbued with a sense of hopelessness anticipate his next album, Nebraska. Springsteen himself has noted that "Wreck on the Highway" is one of the songs reflecting a shift in his songwriting style, linking The River to Nebraska.

== Release and reception ==
"The River" was not released as a single in the U.S., but it was released as a single in April 1981 in several countries in western Europe. It placed number 35 on the UK Singles Chart. It also reached number 24 on the Irish Singles Chart, number 10 in Sweden's singles chart, number 6 in the Danish Top 20 and had its best showing with a number 5 placement on Norway's singles chart. In the U.S., it gained considerable album-oriented rock airplay and became one of Springsteen's best-known songs. It was included on both his 1995 Greatest Hits and 2003 The Essential Bruce Springsteen compilations. The song was also incorporated in the European edition of the 2009 Bruce Springsteen & The E Street Band Greatest Hits.

In 2018, Rolling Stone ranked the song number five on their list of the 100 greatest Bruce Springsteen songs.

Later on, the song reached number 1 in Israel, and the live version from No Nukes reached number 3 in Portugal.

== Live performance history ==
The song was first performed in public at the Musicians United for Safe Energy concerts at Madison Square Garden in September 1979, and was featured in the subsequent 1980 film No Nukes three months before The River's release. During the River Tour of 1980–81, the song was frequently preceded by a piano rendition of the theme from Once Upon a Time in the West, with a similar outro segueing into the following song.

"The River" became a centerpiece of shows on some Springsteen tours. During the 1984–85 Born in the U.S.A. Tour, it was often preceded by a long, intense story from Springsteen about his battles with his father growing up, that would sometimes conclude positively and sometimes not; the silence after the story would then be interrupted by the start of the harmonica part. One such story and performance, that also touched on the Vietnam War, was included on the 1986 Live/1975–85 set.

On later tours, especially in Europe, the song's outro was extended to great length, with audiences mass singing the wordless "oooh" parts at the end. On the 1999–2000 Reunion Tour, "The River" was cast in a different arrangement that featured a Clarence Clemons saxophone part; one such rendition was included on the subsequent Live in New York City album and DVD. The song has been performed almost 700 times as of 2023; since June 16, it was included in the 2023 tour while initially absent from the setlist.

== Personnel ==
According to authors Philippe Margotin and Jean-Michel Guesdon:

- Bruce Springsteen – vocals, guitars, harmonica
- Roy Bittan – piano
- Clarence Clemons – tambourine
- Danny Federici – organ
- Garry Tallent – bass
- Steven Van Zandt – guitars, harmony vocals
- Max Weinberg – drums

== Certifications ==
Region	Certification	Certified units/sales
Australia (ARIA)	Platinum	70,000^{‡}
Denmark (IFPI Danmark)	Gold	45,000^{‡}
New Zealand (RMNZ)	Platinum	30,000^{‡}
Spain (Promusicae)	Gold	30,000^{‡}
United Kingdom (BPI)	Silver	200,000^{‡}
United States (RIAA)	Gold	500,000^{‡}
^{‡} Sales+streaming figures based on certification alone.
