= Incident on 57th Street =

- Label to release as B-side of "War" in Europe in 1986

Song by Bruce Springsteen

from the album The Wild, the Innocent & the E Street Shuffle
- Released: September 11, 1973
- Recorded: 1973
- Studio: 914 Sound Studios in Blauvelt, New York
- Genre: Heartland rock
- Length: 7:45
- Label: Columbia Records
- Songwriter: Bruce Springsteen
- Producer: Mike Appel

"Incident on 57th Street" is a song written by the American singer-songwriter Bruce Springsteen that was first released on his 1973 album The Wild, the Innocent & the E Street Shuffle. It has been described by critics as a key development in Springsteen's songwriting career and regarded by fans as one of his greatest songs.

== Writing and recording ==
"Incident on 57th Street" was the last song Springsteen recorded for The Wild, the Innocent & the E Street Shuffle. As with the rest of the album, it was recorded at 914 Sound Studios in Blauvelt, New York. Springsteen had been working on it under the working title "Puerto Rican Jane." It was one of the first songs on which Springsteen felt like an "observer," writing whatever came out of him rather than self-consciously trying to write something specific. On the album, the piano solo at the end of the song segues directly into the guitar opening of the following song, "Rosalita (Come Out Tonight)."

== Lyrics and music ==
According to Springsteen, the theme of "Incident on 57th Street" is "redemption," a theme he would return to again many times. The story is set in New York City and tells the story of "Spanish Johnny" and "Puerto Rican Jane." It has parallels to Leonard Bernstein's West Side Story in telling a Romeo and Juliet-like story with Latin American characters set in New York. Johnny is explicitly referred to as "a cool Romeo" and Jane as "a late Juliet".

Johnny comes to midtown Manhattan after getting beat up while trying to work as a male escort. Although rejected by everyone else, he finds redemption when Jane sympathizes with him, saying "Johnny don't cry." They sleep together, but when his old companions call to him asking him to join them in making "some easy money," he leaves Jane to join them. Jane tells him that "you can leave me tonight but just don't leave me alone." Johnny agrees to return to her tomorrow, although he doesn't actually know if he will be able to, telling her that "We may find it out on the street tonight, baby/Or we may walk until the daylight maybe." Springsteen leaves the ending ambiguous, leaving to the listener's imagination whether Johnny's adventure that night meets with a tragic end, or whether the lovers actually do get away.

The music starts quietly, with David Sancious on piano with some support from Springsteen on guitar. The song proceeds at a moderate tempo, supported by what music writer Jim Beviglia describes as "hiccuping" from Vini Lopez' drumming. But upon Jane's line of "Johnny don't cry," the music becomes more lively, with Danny Federici's organ taking prominence. After Johnny wakes up from their night of lovemaking, the music dies down again to a solo bass guitar part by Garry Tallent. There are three statements of the line "We may find it out on the street tonight, baby/Or we may walk until the daylight maybe" at the end of the song. Beviglia describes the first as "a whisper," the second as being "more assertive" and the last as "a maelstrom of sound" as Springsteen sings "with majestic desperation as the band crashes all around him." Finally, the song ends with Sancious again on solo piano, which Beviglia interprets as depicting Jane waiting for Johnny to return. The song's harmonies are based primarily on tonic, dominant and subdominant, and the subdominant is often played with a major seventh chord.

As with many of Springsteen's early songs, "Incident on 57th Street" has a complex, extended structure. There are three verses, each in three parts, although the second verse skips the second part. The refrain appears after the first verse, but is skipped at the end of the second verse. At the point at which the second refrain is expected, the music slows down to the solo bass part leading directly to the third verse. After the third verse, a suspended chord on Federici's organ generates a return of the refrain, which is then repeated three additional times as the intensity builds. On the album, after slowing and quieting down to Sancious' ending solo piano part, the music segues into the driving guitars of "Rosalita (Come Out Tonight)."

== Personnel ==
- Bruce Springsteen – lead vocals, guitar

The E Street Band

- Danny Federici – second piano
- Garry Tallent – bass guitar
- David Sancious – piano, organ
- "Mad Dog" Vini Lopez – drums, percussion

== Reception ==
Music writer Patrick Humphries describes "Incident on 57th Street" as "the moment when Springsteen the writer came into his own." Music critic Clinton Heylin called it "an early masterpiece, it is the kinda epic song [Springsteen] has spent his youth imagining and the [previous] 18 months working towards. Rolling Stone critic Dave Marsh calls it one of the "few precious moments in rock when you can hear a musician overcoming both his own limits and the restrictions of the form." Beviglia calls it "the bridge from the 1973 Bruce to the one who has been near or atop the rock-and-roll world for about 40 years now. He goes on to say that "Incident" was a critical step towards Springsteen's being able to create Born to Run, calling it a "dry run that came out perfect."

In 2014, Beviglia rated "Incident on 57th Street as Springsteen's 3rd greatest song. In 2013, a Rolling Stone panel rated it Springsteen's 17th greatest song.

Humphries sees an influence from "Incident on 57th Street" on the structure of Dire Straits' 1980 song "Romeo and Juliet." Rolling Stone viewed it as a precursor to the "expansive urban storytelling" of Springsteen's 1975 classic song "Jungleland." According to Springsteen's saxophone player Clarence Clemons, the introduction to "Jungleland" evolved from the piano and violin introduction to the version of "Incident on 57th Street" that Springsteen had been playing live. Springsteen himself has suggested that the lyrics of "Jungleland" may tell what happened after "Incident on 57th Street," with Johnny becoming "Jungleland"'s Magic Rat.

== Other appearances ==
The first live performance of "Incident on 57th Street" occurred on January 23, 1974, at Muther's Music Emporium in Nashville, Tennessee. In live performances Springsteen rarely performed it directly before "Rosalita" as it is sequenced on the album. "Incident" was one of several songs for which Springsteen hired violinist Suki Lahav to join the E Street Band for live performances in 1974 and 1975. By the late 1970s and early 1980s, "Incident on 57th Street" had fallen to only occasional inclusion in live set lists.

A 10-minute live version of "Incident on 57th Street," recorded at the Nassau Coliseum on December 28, 1980, was released on the 1987 EP Live Collection. The live performance was also released as the B-side of Springsteen's release of the 12" single "War" in Europe in 1986; despite its exceptional length, it also appeared as the B-side of the US release of the "Fire" 7" single. Another live performance was included on the 2003 video Live in Barcelona, with Springsteen on solo piano.
