= The Upstage Club =

Former music venue and coffeehouse in Asbury Park, New Jersey

Coordinates: 40.215516°N 74.012357°W

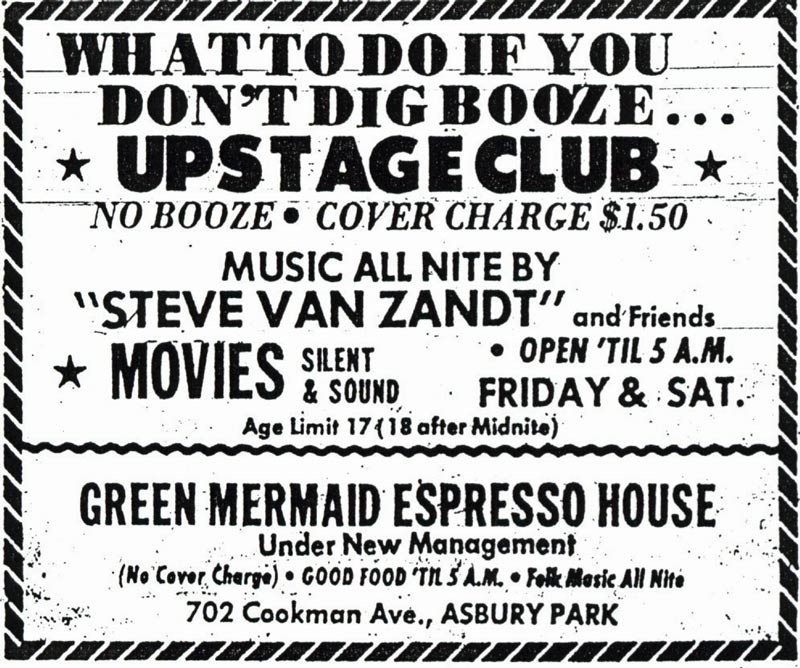
- A June 1969 flyer promoting an appearance of Steven Van Zandt at The Upstage Club
- Interactive map of The Upstage Club
- Location: 700 Cookman Avenue, Asbury Park, New Jersey, U.S.
- Owner: Tom and Margaret Potter
- Type: Music venue, Coffeehouse, Afterhours club
- Events: Blues, blues rock, rhythm and blues, singer-songwriters, rock, folk, heavy metal

Construction
- Opened: 1968
- Closed: 1971

The Upstage Club was a music venue, coffeehouse and afterhours club in Asbury Park, New Jersey. The club is featured in the Rock and Roll Hall of Fame. Influential musicians such as Bruce Springsteen, Bill Chinnock, Southside Johnny (John Lyon), David Sancious, Steven Van Zandt, Garry Tallent, Vini Lopez, and Danny Federici first honed their live performance skills at the club. It was where the Asbury Jukes, Steel Mill, and the Blackberry Blues Band were formed.

== History ==
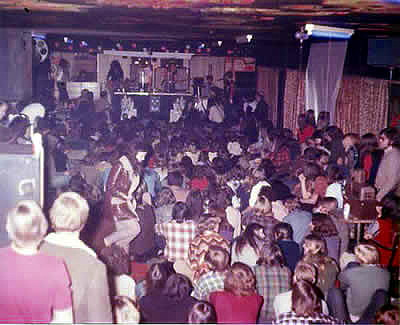
A performance and the audience at The Upstage Club

Although Asbury Park, New Jersey, is currently associated with the sounds of rock and roll from the 1960s and 1970s, its music history did not begin or end there. Since the turn of the century, its music community has included John Philip Sousa, Artie Shaw, and various Broadway theater lyricists and contemporary artists. In its heyday, there were at least 10 elegant supper clubs and jazz joints lining Springwood Avenue.

The Upstage Club was opened by Tom and Margaret Potter in 1968 at Cookman Avenue & Bond Street, Asbury Park, New Jersey, above a Thom McAn shoe store. The venue predated longstanding music venues such as the Stone Pony and The Saint. When it opened, the Green Mermaid Café (a coffee shop) was on the second floor and a music room was on the third floor. Potter insisted that the bands played original music, not cover songs. The music room was decked out with fluorescent paintings and black lighting. The club was alcohol-free, and musicians would jam there all night until around 5 am.

In his 2006 book about the Asbury Park music scene, Beyond the Palace, Gary Wien wrote, "This is where it all began...Musicians gathered each night at a club on the corner of Cookman Avenue and Bond Street that was set on top of a Thom McAn shoe store. The Upstage brought the sights of San Francisco psychedelia and the sounds of Greenwich Village together in an endless array of all night jam sessions, which attracted the best young musicians in the area."

In 1970, shortly after the Club opened, riots tore through Asbury Park, damaging the musically rich Springwood Avenue area, and drug use increased. According to Don Stine, president of the Asbury Park Historical Society, there was an integration of races, cultures, and musical styles at the Upstage. Up to that point in Asbury's history, Black bands did not play the boardwalk clubs, and it was rare for white musicians to perform in the African-American music scene of Springwood Avenue on the West Side. Garry Tallent, future E Street Band bassist, was an exception. In 1969, Clarence Clemons joined Norman Seldin's Joyful Noyze, and eventually, musicians of all colors were jamming at the Upstage. The Upstage was a refuge from the chaos. A sign on the door read, "Leave your anger and hate outside with your booze and drugs."

The Upstage Club has been said to have helped develop the Jersey Shore sound or "Asbury Sound," though musicians and others closely involved with the regional music scene object to the concept and see each band as having a personality and style of their own. According to Richie "La Bamba" Rosenberg, "If the sound that developed at the Shore in the 70s was unique, it was because you could play traditional blues and rock-and-roll. At the same time, audiences were open to experimentation. We mingled everybody's' styles."

The musicians frequenting the Upstage Club formed several influential bands. In the late 1960s, Bruce Springsteen played at the Upstage Club with John Lyon, Steven Van Zandt, Garry Tallent, Danny Federici, David Sancious, and Vini Lopez. The Asbury Jukes', the E Street Band's, and the Hubcap's roots extend to he Upstage Club. Richie "La Bamba" Rosenberg said, "When we started, it was usually me convincing a club owner we had a band that played pop tunes...He'd hire us, and then I'd run to the Upstage club in Asbury Park and whoever was there at the time became the band. We used to call it 'the band of the week.' " Rosenberg said that the Hubcaps consisted mostly of Jukes who were not busy when he was recruiting for the Hubcaps. Van Zandt, Garry Tallent, Federici, Lopez and Sancious, all later joined Springsteen in the E Street Band.

The Upstage Club closed in 1971. In 2014, the site was listed for sale for $1.8 million, which included a $750,000 New Jersey liquor license.

== Media ==
A documentary about the club called "Just Before the Dawn" that tells the story of the Upstage Club was released on April 21, 2017, during the Asbury Park Music & Film Festival. The film was originally going to focus solely on the Upstage Club but its scope was later expanded to include the societal context in which the club was created, and how the music community helped Asbury Park survive. The film was directed by Tom Jones. It reflects on Asbury Park during the 1970s, the impact of race riots, and the emergence of its unique sound. The film features interviews with musicians who played during the era of the Upstage. In the film, Southside Johnny says, "I learned almost everything I know about performing and singing from those three years, two and a half years, at the Upstage because it was like our college." There is also a book about The Upstage Club by Carrie Potter-Devening entitled, "For Music's Sake. Asbury Park's Upstage Club and Green Mermaid Cafe. The Untold Stories", whilst Albee Tellone's "Upstage, Springsteen and Me" gives substantial insights into life in the club.

== See also ==
- List of New Jersey music venues by capacity
