= Cadillac Ranch (Bruce Springsteen song) =

- UK cover

Single by Bruce Springsteen

from the album The River
- B-side: "Wreck on the Highway" (UK); "Be True" (France)
- Released: August 1981
- Recorded: April–June 1980
- Genre: Rock, rockabilly, country rock, heartland rock
- Length: 3:03
- Label: Columbia
- Songwriter: Bruce Springsteen
- Producers: Bruce Springsteen, Jon Landau, Steve Van Zandt

Bruce Springsteen singles chronology
"The River" (1981)	"Cadillac Ranch" (1981)	"Point Blank" (1981)

"Cadillac Ranch" is a song written by Bruce Springsteen that was first released on Springsteen's 1980 album The River. In 1981 it was released as a single in Europe, backed by "Be True" in France and by "Wreck on the Highway" in the UK. Although it was not released as a single in the US, it did reach #48 on the Billboard Mainstream Rock Tracks chart. A favorite in concert, a live version was included on Live/1975–85. A version was also included on the documentary film Blood Brothers.

== Music and lyrics ==
"Cadillac Ranch" is an exuberant, playful rocker with rockabilly influences. According to music critic Dave Marsh, it "made dinosaurs dance." It is highlighted by Clarence Clemons' saxophone solo. Author June Skinner Sawyers called the song "pure rowdy fun" and listed it as one of Springsteen's ten funniest songs. John Cruz of Sputnik Music called the song "just plain fun," noting its infectious beat. However, the theme of the song is "the transitoriness of all existence" and the inevitability of death. Marsh called the song "one of the smartest songs ever about the inevitability of death". Marsh further noted that although the protagonist of "Cadillac Ranch" seems similar to the protagonists of earlier Springsteen records, in this song he appears naive and vulnerable rather than bold and innocent.

The song's title comes from Cadillac Ranch in Amarillo, Texas. Cadillac Ranch is a sculpture showing ten Cadillac automobiles with their hoods buried in the ground. Springsteen used Cadillac Ranch as a metaphor for his theme; that these once elite cars are now expendable.

Burt Reynolds, Junior Johnson, and James Dean are namechecked in the song.

== Personnel ==
According to authors Philippe Margotin and Jean-Michel Guesdon:

- Bruce Springsteen – vocals, guitars
- Roy Bittan – piano, backing vocals
- Clarence Clemons – saxophone, backing vocals
- Danny Federici – organ
- Garry Tallent – bass
- Steven Van Zandt – guitars, vocal harmonies, backing vocals
- Max Weinberg – drums

== Covers ==
Warren Zevon covered "Cadillac Ranch" during his 1982 tour and the song was featured in an MTV broadcast from the Capitol Theatre in Passaic, New Jersey on October 1, 1982.

The Nitty Gritty Dirt Band covered the song on their 1984 album Plain Dirt Fashion as well as the 1991 live album Live Two Five. The Nitty Gritty Dirt Band version has become particularly popular as a line-dancing song in Alberta, Canada.

Rick Trevino's version appears on the compilation albums NASCAR: Runnin' Wide Open (1995) and Highway Fever: All Time Greatest Country Road Songs (2006).

Daniel Johnston's song "Funeral Home" takes its melody from "Cadillac Ranch".

In 2023, country music artist Brett Kissel released a cover of "Cadillac Ranch" on his album The Compass Project - South Album.

== Charts ==
Chart (1981)	Peak position
UK Singles Top 100 (Record Business)	70
