= Steel Mill =

American rock band (1969–1971)

- Also known as: Child (1969)
- Origin: New Jersey, U.S.
- Genres: Rock
- Years active: 1969–1971
- Spinoffs: E Street Band
- Past members: Bruce Springsteen; Vini Lopez; Danny Federici; Vinnie Roslin; Steve Van Zandt; Robbin Thompson

Steel Mill was an early Bruce Springsteen band. Other members of the band included three future members of the E Street Band, Vini Lopez, Danny Federici, and Steve Van Zandt. As well as playing on the Jersey Shore, Steel Mill also played regularly in Richmond, Virginia and played gigs in California and a festival in Nashville, Tennessee. They opened for acts such as Chicago, Boz Scaggs, Grand Funk Railroad, Roy Orbison, Ike & Tina Turner, and Black Sabbath. Since 2004 Vini Lopez has led Steel Mill Retro which has performed and recorded original Springsteen songs from the Steel Mill era.

== History ==
=== Early bands ===
Three of the band's founding members, Bruce Springsteen, Vini Lopez, and Vinnie Roslin met for the first time on April 22, 1966, at a battle of the bands competition at the Matawan-Keyport Roller Drome in Matawan, New Jersey. Roslin was one of the judges while Springsteen and Lopez competed in the competition with their respective bands, The Castiles and Sonny & The Starfires. However, before coming together to form Steel Mill, both Springsteen and Lopez went on to play in other bands. Springsteen formed Earth with fellow Ocean County College students John Graham (bass) and Michael Burke (drums). They would later be joined by another former Castile, Bob Alfano (organ). Lopez, meanwhile, played with the Downtown Tangiers Band, which also included Bill Chinnock, Danny Federici and Garry Tallent, and then in Moment of Truth with Tallent, Federici and Ricky DeSarno (guitars).

=== Child ===
In 1968, The Upstage Club was opened at 702 Cookman Avenue in Asbury Park, New Jersey. The club would subsequently play a central role in the history of both Bruce Springsteen and the E Street Band and Southside Johnny & The Asbury Jukes. On February 14, 1969, Lopez, looking to recruit a guitarist for a new band, saw Springsteen play with Earth at the Italian American Mens Association Clubhouse in Long Branch, New Jersey.

On February 21, Lopez, Springsteen, Federici, and Roslin got together at the Upstage and formed a new band called Child. Carl "Tinker" West, a surfboard designer and concert promoter originally from California, became the band's manager.

From March 1969 on, Child played regularly at the Pandemonium in Wanamassa, New Jersey. On May 28 they opened for James Cotton at this venue. Child also played there on July 20, 1969, the night of the Apollo 11 first crewed Moon landing. The club installed several TV monitors especially for the occasion. During the show the audience stopped watching the band and turned their attention to Neil Armstrong. As a result, the band fell out with the club management and never played there again. On November 1, 1969, the band played their last show using the name Child at Virginia Commonwealth University in Richmond, Virginia.

Shortly after, they discovered that another band from Long Island was also using the name and had just released an album under that name on Roulette Records. Roslin has stated that they were actually mistaken for the other Child during shows in Richmond, Virginia.

=== Steel Mill ===
To avoid confusion with the other Child, the band changed their name to Steel Mill, a name suggested by Chuck Dillon, a friend of Lopez. On November 21, 1969, at Randolph-Macon College in Ashland, Virginia, the band opened for Chicago and the following night they opened for Iron Butterfly at the same venue. In early 1970 Steel Mill visited San Francisco and performed at The Matrix and Fillmore West, and played on the same bill as Elvin Bishop, Boz Scaggs and Grin. Two unexpected incidents occurred on January 13. Scheduled headliner Boz Scaggs called in sick, and San Francisco Examiner music critic Philip Elwood was in the audience to review Boz Scaggs' performance. Elwood was astonished by Steel Mill's performance, scribing, "I have never been so overwhelmed by a totally unknown talent.”

On February 22, the band recorded three songs, "Goin’ Back To Georgia", "The Train Song" and "He’s Guilty (Send That Boy To Jail)", at Pacific Recording Studio in San Mateo, California for Bill Graham. Graham had just formed Fillmore Records and offered Steel Mill a contract. However the band rejected it. Shortly after returning from San Francisco, Roslin left Steel Mill. He played his last gig with the band at Virginia Commonwealth University on February 28, 1970. He was subsequently replaced by Steve Van Zandt. Roslin was let go by the band due to disagreement over rehearsal time and effort put in.

On their return from California, Steel Mill continued to play regularly on the Jersey Shore and in Richmond, Virginia. On June 13, 1970, they opened for Grand Funk Railroad at the Ocean Ice Palace in Bricktown, New Jersey. On June 21, they played at the Clearwater Swim Club in Atlantic Highlands, New Jersey, where their opening act was Glory Road, a band whose line up included Garry Tallent and Bill Chinnock.

In August, the band added Robbin Thompson as lead vocalist. Thompson had been the lead singer with Mercy Flight, a Richmond-based band that had regularly opened for Steel Mill. He made his debut with Steel Mill on August 29 at the 3rd Annual Nashville Music Festival, sponsored by WMAC. Steel Mill was one of about twenty different acts to take part. Headliners included Roy Orbison, Brian Hyland, Ronnie Milsap, Bobby Bloom, Ballin' Jack, Ten Wheel Drive and The Illusion. Steel Mill was one of only a handful of acts on the bill without a record contract - some college students with connections on the festival's organizing committee had seen Steel Mill perform previously in Richmond and helped the band gain a slot on the bill.

On September 11, they played another show at the Clearwater Swim Club. Among the opening acts was a local folk singer, Jeannie Clark, whose backing band consisted of Steve Van Zandt, Garry Tallent and Southside Johnny. Steel Mill's lineup for this show included guest drummer Dave Hazlett of Mercy Flight. Lopez had earlier been detained in Richmond after getting caught up in a police raid. The show was put on in order to raise money for their drummer. Steel Mill kept playing after curfew, causing police officers to come to the stage to end the gig, cutting the power in the process. Protests were heard and Danny Federici allegedly dropped some sound equipment on the police in front of the stage, then managed to disappear into the crowd as riots broke out between the crowd and the police. Federici escaped arrest and earned the nickname "Phantom", which would stay with him.

On October 11, they opened for Ike & Tina Turner at The Mosque in Richmond. On November 27, they played on a triple bill with Cactus and Black Sabbath at the Sunshine Inn in Asbury Park, New Jersey.

On Thanksgiving, November 25, 1970, they played on a bill with The Institution at Newark State College, now Kean University. The Institution was a seminal New Jersey garage band founded in 1965 by Philip Rubin, J. Howard Duff, Richard Lester, and Marvin Coopersmith, whose members also included Joey Kramer, later of Aerosmith.

Steel Mill played their final show on January 23, 1971, at The Upstage. During the early 1970s Springsteen, Lopez, Federici and Van Zandt would go on to play together in several short-lived bands based out of the Upstage. These included Bruce Springsteen & The Friendly Enemies, The Sundance Blues Band, Dr. Zoom & The Sonic Boom, which once opened for the Allman Brothers at the Sunshine Inn in Asbury Park, and The Bruce Springsteen Band, which often played at the Student Prince in Asbury Park. These bands eventually evolved into the E Street Band.

=== Steel Mill Retro ===
Since 2004, Vini Lopez has led Steel Mill Retro, a band which has played and recorded Bruce Springsteen songs from the Steel Mill era. Lopez was a veteran of numerous Jersey Shore bands, several of which had featured Steel Mill songs in their set lists. In 1989, Lopez was playing with Live Bait, a band led by singer/songwriter Laura Crisci. The band also included two early Springsteen songs in its setlist, "Goin' Back To Georgia" and "Cowboys of the Sea", which were performed by The Bruce Springsteen Band. Its setlists included an original song written by Steve Clark, "Whatever Happened to Asbury Park?" Lopez performed lead vocals on both songs.

During the 1990s, Lopez led his own bar band, Maddog & The Disco Rejects. Members of the band included John Luraschi (bass) and Ricky DeSarno (guitars). The band also performed early Springsteen songs in its setlist, By 2002 Lopez was playing with Cold Blast and Steel which also included John Luraschi and Rick DeSarno. and eventually developed into Steel Mill Retro, which included Ricky DeSarno.

In 2007, they released "The Dead Sea Chronicles", an album that featured Steel Mill era songs. In September 2008 Steel Mill Retro also played at a Springsteen fan convention in Rotterdam, organised by the Dutch fan club Roulette. They were accompanied to the convention by Carl "Tinker" West, the original manager of Steel Mill. The current line-up of the band features Lopez, Steve Lusardi and Adam Glenn (keyboards), Ed Piersanti (bass) and John Galella (guitar).

== Discography ==
Both Robbin Thompson and Vini Lopez, as part of Steel Mill Retro, have recorded songs originally performed by the band.

- Robbin Thompson
  - "He’s Guilty (Send That Boy To Jail)" : Recorded as "Guilty" for the 1985 album Better Late Than Never. Also included on the 2002 Thompson collection The Vinyl Years. In 1997 it was also included on One Step Up/Two Steps Back: The Songs Of Bruce Springsteen.
  - "The Train Song" : featured on 2007 album One Step Ahead of the Blues
- Steel Mill Retro
  - The Dead Sea Chronicles (2007)
  - All Man the Guns for America (2009)
- Steel Mill
  - "He’s Guilty (Send That Boy To Jail)" : Released on Bruce Springsteen's 2016 compilation album Chapter and Verse

The January 13, 1970 performance was taped by radio station KSAN-FM and subsequently broadcast. It is available at the Internet Archive.
