= Stolen Car (Bruce Springsteen song) =

Song by Bruce Springsteen

from the album The River
- Released: October 1980
- Recorded: January 1980
- Studio: Power Station, New York City
- Genre: Rock
- Length: 3:54
- Label: Columbia Records
- Songwriter: Bruce Springsteen
- Producers: Jon Landau, Bruce Springsteen, Steven Van Zandt

"Stolen Car" is a song written and performed by the American singer-songwriter Bruce Springsteen. It was originally released on his fifth album, The River. The version released on The River was recorded at The Power Station in New York in January 1980. An alternative version recorded in July 1979 was released on Tracks in 1998.

== History ==
"Stolen Car" was written quickly and first recorded the day after "Hungry Heart. Music critic Clinton Heylin has suggested that it may have begun as a continuation of that song, as "Stolen Car" originally used similar language to explain the marriage failure: "We got married and promised never to part/Then I feel a victim to a hungry heart." "Stolen Car," along with a few other songs on The River including the title track and "Wreck on the Highway", mark a new direction in Bruce Springsteen's songwriting. These ballads, imbued with a sense of hopelessness, foreshadow his next album, Nebraska. Like "The River", "Stolen Car" is an inner-directed, psychological song that deals with a failing marriage. The protagonist of "Stolen Car" is driven by his loneliness to car theft, hoping to get caught but fearing to just disappear. Essentially, he wants to get arrested just to prove he exists. Author June Skinner Sawyers describes the theme of the song to be "the struggle to create meaning for oneself." She notes that it "just tells a story, honestly and simply, offering one of Springsteen's most precise lyrics." Patrick Humphries describes the effect as being similar to the Robert Mitchum film noir Build My Gallows High.

The recording uses minimal backing, with soft piano and synthesizer punctuated by tympani-like drums. Springsteen's biographer Dave Marsh wrote that the recording fades away "without a nuance of reluctance. There is nothing more here—just a waste of life and a man brave or stupid enough to watch it trickle away." Bruce Springsteen himself has noted that "Stolen Car" is one of the songs reflecting a shift in his songwriting style, linking The River to Nebraska. He noted that the protagonist "felt disconnected and felt that he was fading away, disappearing, felt invisible," just like Springsteen himself felt invisible while he was growing up. He has also stated that the protagonist was the character whose progress he would be following on the Tunnel of Love album, and that he served as the archetype for the male role in future songs Springsteen wrote about men and women. Springsteen would also develop themes from "Stolen Car" on other future songs, including "State Trooper" and "Highway Patrolman" from his 1982 Nebraska album and "Downbound Train" from his 1984 Born in the U.S.A. album.

In 2015, Springsteen stated that he regards "Stolen Car," "Point Blank," "Independence Day" and the title track as being "the heart and soul" of The River album. "Stolen Car" and another song from The River, "Drive All Night", played a key role in setting the tone of the 1997 film Cop Land. It has been listed as one of the all-time great songs in Toby Creswell's "1001 songs" and as one of the 7500 most important songs from 1944 through 2000 by Bruce Pollock.

== Alternate version ==
An alternate version of the song exists that was released on the album Tracks. This version, sometimes referred to as the "Son you may kiss the bride" version of the song, was recorded at The Power Station in July 1979. This version was originally intended to be released on a single album that was to be released in 1979 and called The Ties That Bind. This album was eventually scrapped and expanded to become the double album The River. In this process, "Stolen Car" was rerecorded in the version released on The River.

The version of the song on Tracks has additional verses and the instrumentation is not as dark as in the version released on The River. In the final verse, the song's protagonist dreams of his wedding day and the joy and hope he felt but as he dreams of kissing his bride at the end of the ceremony he feels everything slip away again. A subtle difference between this version and The River version is that whereas on The River version the singer fears he will disappear into the night, in this version he already has, like a ghost. The lyrics of this version also include river imagery used in some other songs on The River, including the title track and "Hungry Heart". In this version of the song, the singer—or his ghost—surrenders to the river similarly to the boy in the Flannery O'Connor story "The River," whose "fury and fear left him" drowns in the river he was intending to baptize himself in. Heylin referred to Springsteen replacing this version with the version released on The River as "an act of self-sabotage".

== Personnel ==
According to authors Philippe Margotin and Jean-Michel Guesdon:

- Bruce Springsteen – vocals, guitar
- Roy Bittan – piano
- Danny Federici – organ
- Garry Tallent – bass
- Max Weinberg – drums
