= Vinnie Roslin =

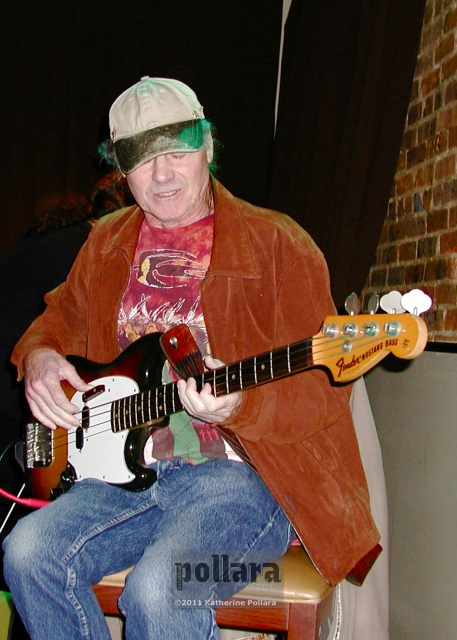
- Roslin in 2007 at Red Bank NJ

Background information
- Also known as: Little Vinnie
- Origin: Monmouth County, New Jersey, United States
- Genres: Rock
- Occupation: Musician
- Instrument: Bass
- Years active: 1964–2012
- Formerly of: Steel Mill

Vinnie Roslin (1946-2012) was an American bassist who was an original member of Steel Mill, an early Bruce Springsteen band. Other members of band included three future members of the E Street Band - Vini Lopez, Danny Federici and Steve Van Zandt.

== Early years ==
Roslin grew up in and around the Howell Township and the Freehold Borough areas of Monmouth County, New Jersey. In late 1964, then aged 17, together with George Theiss (rhythm guitar, vocals), Bart Haynes (drums, vocals) and Mike DeLuise (lead guitar), he formed a band called The Sierras. They spent most of their short life in rehearsal and in early 1965 Roslin quit this band to join The Motifs with Walter Cichon (lead vocals) and Murray Bauer. Theiss and Haynes would later go on to form The Castiles and in June 1965 they were joined in that band by Bruce Springsteen. The Motifs were managed by Norman Seldin, a local musician–entrepreneur whose own band, The Joyful Noyze, included Clarence Clemons. Under the management of Seldin, The Motifs released at least two singles which became local hits. "Molly" and "If I Gave You Love" were both released by Seldin's own label, Selsom Records. In 2008 both songs were reissued on an anthology, Asbury Park - Then And Now, put together by Seldin. The Motifs also opened for bands such as The Young Rascals and The Duprees. Roslin would continue to play with The Motifs until he was 21. They split up when Walter Cichon was conscripted. Cichon, together with Bart Haynes, one of Roslin's earlier bandmates, were both killed while serving in Vietnam.

== Steel Mill ==
Roslin met Bruce Springsteen and Vini Lopez for the first time on April 22, 1966, when Norman Seldin organized a battle of the bands competition at the Matawan-Keyport Roller Drome in Matawan, New Jersey. Roslin was one of the judges while Springsteen and Lopez competed in the competition with their respective bands, The Castiles and Sonny & The Starfires. In February 1969, following the breakup of The Motifs, Roslin got together with Springsteen, Lopez and Danny Federici at The Upstage on 702 Cookman Avenue in Asbury Park, New Jersey, and formed a new band. They initially played as Child, but in November 1969 changed their name to Steel Mill to avoid confusion with another band. The highlight of Roslin's time with the band came in early 1970 when Steel Mill visited San Francisco and performed at The Matrix and Fillmore West, playing on the same bill as Elvin Bishop, Boz Scaggs and Grin. On February 22, they also recorded a three-song demo at the Pacific Recording Studio in San Mateo, California, for Bill Graham. Graham had just formed Fillmore Records and actually offered Steel Mill a contract. However the band rejected it. Shortly after returning from San Francisco, Roslin left Steel Mill. He played his last gig with the band at the Virginia Commonwealth University on February 28, 1970, and he was subsequently replaced by Steve Van Zandt.

According to Springsteen biographer Peter Ames Carlin, Roslin was kicked out of Steel Mill. He enjoyed life in San Francisco a little too much, Carlin wrote, missing band meetings, rehearsals and sound checks. When he also expressed interest in the band signing away Springsteen's publishing rights to his songs for the sake of the $1,000 advance Graham was offering for a contract, Springsteen decided Roslin had to go.

== Later years ==
Since leaving Steel Mill, Roslin has played in several other Jersey Shore bands. He initially joined a reformed Motifs before playing in Maddog & The Shakes with Vini Lopez and Ricky DeSarno (lead guitar). The Shakes based their sound on Motown and Memphis and have been described as "one of the great unsigned Asbury Park bands of the mid-1970s". He later played with The George Theiss Band and in 1987 he teamed up again with Lopez in J.P. Gotrock. By 1998 he was playing with Red Bank Boogie which was then reformed as Blue Plate Special in late 2000. Roslin formed both bands with his girlfriend Robin Roselle. He regularly sat in at the local Blues jams and performed with local Blues bands such as Nine Below Zero.

== Death ==
Roslin died in February 2012 from complications related to heart surgery.

== Discography ==
- Blue Plate Special: Cookin’
- Stormin' Norman & Friends: Asbury Park - Then And Now (2008)
