= Flemington (album) =

Studio album by Danny Federici
- Released: 1997
- Genre: Pop/Rock, Jazz
- Length: 41:28
- Label: Musicmasters
- Producer: Danny Federici

Danny Federici chronology
Flemington (1997)	Danny Federici (2001)

Professional ratings
Review scores
Source	Rating
Allmusic	link

Flemington is the debut solo record from Bruce Springsteen's E Street Band keyboardist Danny Federici. It was first released in 1996 on Deadeye Records, a label Federici co-owned with Franklin Jenkins and Ben Arrington of Diamondback, then in 1997 picked up by Musicmasters Records (see 1997 in music). Federici himself produced the disc (as well as playing the accordion and all manner of keyboards), and wrote all the tracks, except one which was co-written by Tony Braunagel.

== Track listing ==
All Songs Written By Danny Federici except where noted.

1. "Flemington" 3:38
2. "Mingle-Mangle" 2:58
3. "My Little Cow" 3:50
4. "Mr. Continental" 3:25
5. "Carousel Breeze" 2:35
6. "Egg Beater" (Tony Braunagel, Federici) 3:38
7. "A Doorman's Life" 4:57
8. "Sea Bright" 3:20
9. "Round & Round" 3:15
10. "In The Next Five Minutes" 4:44
11. "Pennsylvania Avenue" 5:08

== Personnel ==
- Danny Federici - keyboards, synthesizers, organ, piano, accordion
- John DeFaria, Nils Lofgren - guitars
- Alfredo Fettucini, Garry Tallent - bass
- Joe Sublett - saxophone
- Tony Branaugel - drums, percussion

== Production ==
- Arranged & Produced By Danny Federici
- Engineered By Dennis Degher & Danny Federici
- Mixed By Dennis Degher
- Mastered By Bernie Grundman
