= Ramrod (Bruce Springsteen song) =

1980 song by Bruce Springsteen

Song by Bruce Springsteen

from the album The River
- B-side: The River; "Point Blank"
- Released: October 17, 1980
- Recorded: June 12, 1979
- Studio: Power Station, New York City
- Genre: Rock; rock and roll
- Length: 4:05
- Label: Columbia Records
- Songwriter: Bruce Springsteen
- Producers: Jon Landau, Bruce Springsteen, Steven Van Zandt

"Ramrod" is a song written and performed by the American singer-songwriter Bruce Springsteen for his fifth album, The River, released in 1980. It was recorded at The Power Station in New York on June 12, 1979. The song was written and originally recorded on September 12, 1977, for Springsteen's Darkness on the Edge of Town album, but that recording was not used for its release on The River.

Although "Ramrod" was never released as the A-side of a single, it reached #30 on the Billboard Hot Mainstream Rock Tracks chart in 1981. It has remained a popular song in concerts by Bruce Springsteen with the E Street Band, with about 410 performances through 2008, and appearing on both the CD and DVD versions of Live in New York City.

In the Netherlands, "Ramrod" was released as the B-side of the "Point Blank" single in 1981. In other countries it was released as the B-side of "The River".

== Personnel ==
According to authors Philippe Margotin and Jean-Michel Guesdon:

- Bruce Springsteen – vocals, guitars
- Roy Bittan – piano
- Clarence Clemons – saxophone, tambourine
- Danny Federici – organ
- Garry Tallent – bass
- Steven Van Zandt – guitars, vocal harmonies
- Max Weinberg – drums
- The band – handclaps
