= Flemington, Florida =

Unincorporated community in Florida, U.S.

Coordinates: 29°24′28″N 82°17′51″W

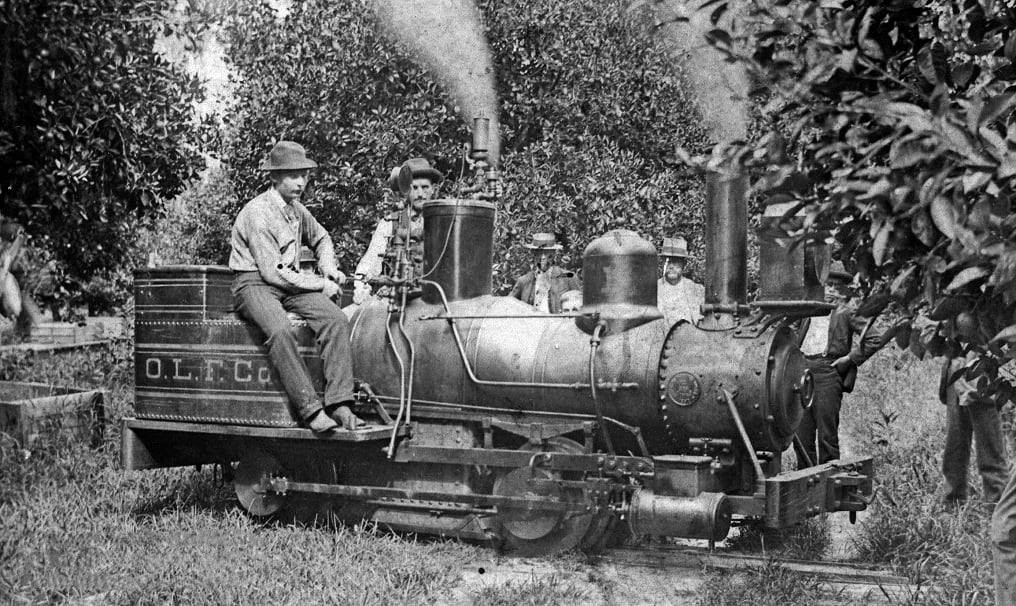
18-inch gauge steam locomotive on the 5 miles long tramway of the Orange Lake Fruit Company, from Orange Lake to Flemington. It was built by Lima Locomotive Works as No 386 on 26 March 1892. The tramway closed in 1896 after a hard winter freeze killed the fruit crop. The locomotive was then sold to the Richmond Cedar Works in Richmond, Virginia.

Flemington is an unincorporated community in Marion County, in the U.S. state of Florida.

A post office called Flemington was established in 1847, and remained in operation until it was discontinued in 1910. The community bears the name of John Fleming.
