= Vini Lopez =

American drummer (born 1949)

- Also known as: Mad Dog
- Born: Vincent Lopez; January 22, 1949 (age 77); Neptune Township, New Jersey, United States
- Origin: Monmouth County, New Jersey, United States
- Genre: Rock
- Occupation: Musician
- Instruments: Drums, percussion, piano, trumpet, cornet
- Years active: 1968–present
- Formerly of: E Street Band

Vincent Lopez (born January 22, 1949), nicknamed Mad Dog, is an American drummer. Between 1968 and 1974, he backed Bruce Springsteen in several bands, including Steel Mill and the E Street Band. He also played on Springsteen's first two albums, Greetings from Asbury Park, N.J. and The Wild, the Innocent and the E Street Shuffle. Both during and after his time with the E Street Band, Lopez played drums with numerous Jersey Shore bands.

In April 2014, Lopez was inducted by Springsteen into the Rock and Roll Hall of Fame as a member of the E Street Band.

== Early years ==
Vincent Lopez grew up in Neptune Township, New Jersey where he attended Neptune High School with future E Street Band bass player Garry Tallent and Southside Johnny. From 1956 to 1962, he played the soprano valve bugle in a Drum and Bugle Corps. Then, as a teenager, he taught himself the drums and began playing with Buzzy Lubinsky, a drummer/DJ based in Asbury Park. Lubinsky's father was Herman Lubinsky, owner of Savoy Records in Newark. Lubinsky would subsequently act as a mentor for the young Lopez. Starting in 1964, with encouragement from Lubinsky, he began to try out for local bands. After a failed audition for the Storytellers, a band which included Bill Chinnock and future E Street Band keyboardist Danny Federici, he successfully auditioned for the Blazers, led by Sonny Kenn. They subsequently became Sonny & The Sounds and then Sonny & The Starfires.

After graduating from high school in 1967, he continued to play with several local bands. These included the Downtown Tangiers Band, with Federici, Chinnock and Garry Tallent, and Moment of Truth with Tallent, Tom Worieo, and Ricky DeSarno (guitar). DeSarno and Lopez would become regular collaborators after Lopez left the E Street Band. In 1970, Lopez worked at Carvers boatyard in Point Pleasant, New Jersey.

=== The Upstage years ===
In 1968, The Upstage Club was opened at 702 Cookman Avenue in Asbury Park. The club would play a central role in the history of both Bruce Springsteen and the E Street Band and Southside Johnny & The Asbury Jukes. In February 1969, Springsteen and Lopez got together with Danny Federici and Vinnie Roslin at The Upstage and formed a new band. Vini got in touch with Carl “Tinker” West and he became the band's manager and mentor. They initially played as Child but in November 1969 changed their name to Steel Mill to avoid confusion with another band. Springsteen and Lopez had already met on several occasions. On April 22, 1966, they played with their respective bands, the Castiles and Sonny & The Starfires, in a battle of the bands competition at the Matawan-Keyport Roller Drome in Matawan, New Jersey.

During the early 1970s, Lopez and Springsteen would go on to play together in several short-lived bands based out of the Upstage. These included Bruce Springsteen & The Friendly Enemies, the Sundance Blues Band, Dr. Zoom & The Sonic Boom Band and the Bruce Springsteen Band. Most of these bands included a core membership of Danny Federici, Garry Tallent, David Sancious, Steve Van Zandt and Southside Johnny. The Bruce Springsteen Band also included Delores Holmes and Barbara Dinkins. Dinkins would later be replaced by Francine Daniels.

== E Street Band ==
In 1972, after Springsteen signed a recording contract with Columbia Records, he returned to The Upstage to recruit a band to record and then tour in support of his upcoming debut album, Greetings from Asbury Park, N.J.. Together with Danny Federici, Garry Tallent, David Sancious and Clarence Clemons, Lopez was a founding member of what eventually became the E Street Band. It was also around this time that Clive Davis first gave Lopez his "Mad Dog" nickname. By 1973, they had recorded a second album with Springsteen, The Wild, the Innocent and the E Street Shuffle. Other recordings from this era featuring Lopez would later be released on the compilations Tracks and 18 Tracks. Lopez left the band in acrimonious circumstances. He got into a fight with Steve Appel, the band's road manager and brother of then manager Mike Appel, and was fired by Springsteen. In a 2005 interview with The New York Times, Lopez said, "At that point, I didn't think the band was going to go too far and I didn't care either... I made a few mistakes, you know, everybody makes mistakes. I still thought it was my band."

== Reunions with Springsteen ==
Since his departure from the E Street Band, Lopez has reunited with Springsteen on multiple occasions. On September 8, 1974 at The Stone Pony, following a set by the Blackberry Booze Band, Springsteen, accompanied by Lopez and Garry Tallent, joined Southside Johnny for several songs, including a rendition of "Twist and Shout". Shortly afterwards, the Blackberry Booze Band, led by Southside Johnny and Steve Van Zandt, became Southside Johnny & The Asbury Jukes.

On January 18, 1989, Lopez, together with George Theiss, the leader of the Castiles, an early Springsteen band, and Patti Scialfa, was one of Springsteen's guests at the 4th Annual Rock and Roll Hall of Fame dinner at the Waldorf Astoria Hotel. Backstreets, a Springsteen fanzine, reported that Springsteen had invited Lopez on stage during the jam session and that he subsequently backed Little Richard, Stevie Wonder, Mick Jagger and Keith Richards as well as Springsteen himself during a performance of Roy Orbison's "Crying". On July 21, 2003, at Giants Stadium during the Rising Tour, Lopez also made a guest appearance, playing on "Spirit in the Night". Lopez made another guest appearance with the E Street band on October 20, 2009, backing Springsteen at the Wachovia Spectrum in Philadelphia on "Spirit in the Night". On September 19, 2012, Lopez made a guest appearance during Springsteen's first concert at the new MetLife Stadium, playing on "The E Street Shuffle".

On April 10, 2014, Lopez was inducted as a member of the E Street Band into the Rock and Roll Hall of Fame and performed three songs with the band during the ceremony. Lopez made a guest appearance in 2016 during a show on the River Tour 2016 in Philadelphia on September 9, 2016, performing on "It's Hard to Be a Saint in the City" and "Spirit in the Night".

== The Lord Gunner Group ==
In the 1970s, Lopez played with the Lord Gunner Group, one of the Jersey Shore's most popular unsigned groups. The power rock band was led by Lance Larson on lead vocals and Ricky DeSarno on lead guitar. In 1974, Lopez, Larson and DeSarno, together with John Luraschi (bass), played together in Cold Blast and Steel. Luraschi was an Upstage veteran and had been a fringe member of Dr. Zoom. Together with Southside Johnny & The Asbury Jukes, Cold Blast and Steel became one of the top two performing bands in New Jersey. However, by 1975 Lopez was leading his own band, Maddog & The Shakes, which featured Vinnie Roslin and DeSarno. The Shakes based their sound on Motown and Memphis and have been described as "one of the great unsigned Asbury Park bands of the mid-1970s". In 1977, Lopez briefly moved to Maine where he reunited with Bill Chinnock and played on the latter's Badlands album.

Meanwhile, back on the Jersey Shore, Larsen and DeSarno had formed the Lord Gunner Group. Lopez was the second of three notable drummers to play with the band. He succeeded Ernest Carter, who had earlier replaced Lopez in the E Street Band. When he left the band, Lopez was replaced by future Bon Jovi drummer Tico Torres. The band played original music and high-impact rock at their live shows. They became the house band at The Stone Pony and opened for acts such as David Johansen, Sly & The Family Stone and John Cafferty. They later played larger venues throughout the Eastern Seaboard and their opening acts included the Smithereens and Jon Bon Jovi and The Wild Ones. Although Lord Gunner never recorded an album of its own, they did feature on the compilation The Sounds of Asbury Park. Lord Gunner had several opportunities to be signed, but another incident involving Lopez and a manager ended one of its best chances. After self-financing and self-promoting a showcase at a club for several A&R representatives, Larson and Lopez discovered that, without consulting them, their manager had also booked an opening band, with the intention of trying to get them signed. An angry Lopez had to be escorted from the club by police. Larson played a few songs, then calmly approached the microphone to ask all of the A&R representatives to leave the first few rows and let the band's friends and fans sit down in their places. All the representatives then left the club and Lord Gunner lost their shot at a deal.

== Steel Mill Retro ==
After leaving the Lord Gunner Group, Lopez went on to play with several Jersey Shore bands led by Paul Whistler, formerly of the Blackberry Booze Band. These included the Wheels and the Asbury All-Stars. The latter band also featured Mike Scialfa, the brother of Patti Scialfa. In the mid-1980s he played in both Opus I and the Acme Boogie Company with vocalist-guitarist-bassist Sam Cooper. In 1987, he reunited with Vinnie Roslin in J.P. Gotrock. By 1989, Lopez was playing with Live Bait, a band led by singer-songwriter Laura Crisci. In addition to original Crisci songs, this band included two early Springsteen songs in its set list, "Goin' Back To Georgia", from the Steel Mill era, and "Cowboys of the Sea", which had been performed by the Bruce Springsteen Band. Lopez took lead vocals on both songs.

In the 1990s, Lopez led his own bar band, Maddog & The Disco Rejects. Members of the band included Sam Cooper, John Luraschi, Ricky DeSarno and Bob Alfano, who had played keyboards with two early Springsteen bands, the Castiles and Earth. This band also included early Springsteen songs in its set list.

By 2002, Lopez was playing with Cold Blast and Steel, which also included John Luraschi and Ricky DeSarno. Its setlists included an original song called "Whatever Happened to Asbury Park?", written by Steve Clark, and another Steel Mill song, "The Judge". By 2004, the band had developed into Steel Mill Retro, led by Lopez, and also featuring Ricky DeSarno. The band has performed and recorded original Springsteen songs from the Steel Mill era, and mentored emerging artists such as the Ries Brothers. In 2007, they released The Dead Sea Chronicles, an album that features Steel Mill-era songs. In September 2008, Steel Mill Retro played at a Springsteen fan convention in Rotterdam organized by the Dutch fan club Roulette. They were accompanied to the convention by Carl "Tinker" West, the original manager of Steel Mill. They have since released another album called All Man the Guns for America. The lineup currently includes Lopez on drums, John Galella on guitar, Ed Piersanti on bass, Steve Lusardi on B3 and Adam Glenn on keys.

== Personal life ==
Lopez lives in Hamilton, New Jersey with his fiancée, Dawn Bearce. He has a daughter Liz, who is an accountant, by his late wife Laurel, who died in 2004.

Away from his music career, Lopez has worked as a golf caddy for Mark McCormick for over 25 years. They played in the U.S. Open in 2012 and the U.S. Senior Open in 2017.

== Discography ==
- Bruce Springsteen
  - Greetings from Asbury Park, N.J. (1973)
  - The Wild, the Innocent and the E Street Shuffle (1973)
  - Tracks (1998)
  - 18 Tracks (1999)
- Steel Mill Retro
  - The Dead Sea Chronicles (2005)
  - All Man the Guns for America (2007)
- Bill Chinnock
  - Badlands (1978)
- Selected others
  - Various artists: The Sounds Of Asbury Park (as a member of The Acme Boogie Company) (1980)
