= Danny Federici =

American musician (1950–2008)

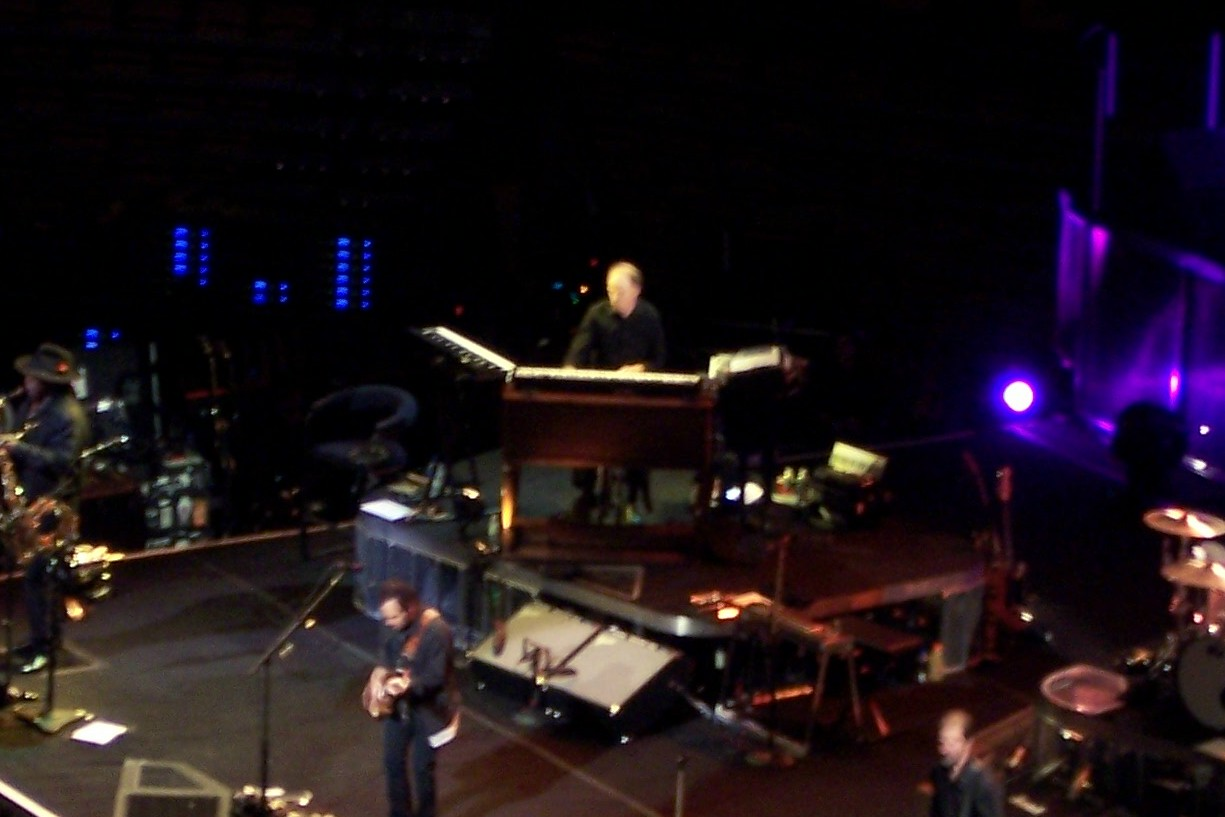
- Federici playing organ with the E Street Band, November 2007

Background information
- Also known as: Phantom Dan
- Born: January 23, 1950; Flemington, New Jersey
- Died: April 17, 2008 (aged 58) New York City, New York
- Genres: Rock, jazz
- Occupation: Musician
- Instruments: Keyboards, accordion, glockenspiel
- Years active: 1968–2008
- Labels: Hip-O Records, V2 Records, Music Masters Jazz, Columbia
- Formerly of: E Street Band

Daniel Paul Federici (January 23, 1950 – April 17, 2008) was an American musician, best known as a founding member of Bruce Springsteen's E Street Band, where he was its organist, accordionist and glockenspiel player. Federici appeared on ten of Springsteen's studio albums.

In 2014, Federici was posthumously inducted into the Rock and Roll Hall of Fame as a member of the E Street Band.

== Career ==
Federici started to play accordion when he was seven years old, which he learned from watching The Lawrence Welk Show. When he mastered classical music and polka, his mother booked him at parties, clubs and on radio. While he continued his studies in classical accordion, he gained an interest in jazz and blues, after he heard a professor at the Neupauer Conservatory of Music in Philadelphia play those styles on accordion.

During in-concert band intros, Springsteen often referred to him as "Phantom", sometimes said to be because of an incident in Asbury Park in the 1960s where Federici evaded a police crackdown that resulted in the arrest of numerous others. Federici attended Hunterdon Central High School in New Jersey. When he, along with Vini Lopez, started the band Child at the end of the 1960s, their choice for a singer was Springsteen; Federici also joined Springsteen in other early efforts such as Steel Mill.

Federici's organ fills are a key component in the E Street sound, and sometimes take on a more prominent role, such as on the hit "Hungry Heart". He pioneered the trademark E Street glockenspiel sound with a rare keyboard glockenspiel known as a Jenco Celestette, which Danny would perch atop his Hammond B3 Organ. The design is unique in that there are resonator tubes similar to those of vibes protruding vertically from the top in staggered lengths resembling calliope or organ pipes, amplifying the horizontal xylophone-like bell bars below which were struck by keyboard actuated hammers much like that of a piano. He subsequently used electronic keyboards to simulate the glockenspiel sound. Another notable performance is his accordion solo on "4th of July, Asbury Park (Sandy)". It was reported in an interview in Backstreets Magazine that Federici did not have the best working relationship while playing with pianist David Sancious in the early days of the E Street Band, because Sancious would comment on Federici's parts and constantly tell him what to play and what not to play. Keyboard Magazine published an article in 2008 detailing the instrumentation Danny used.

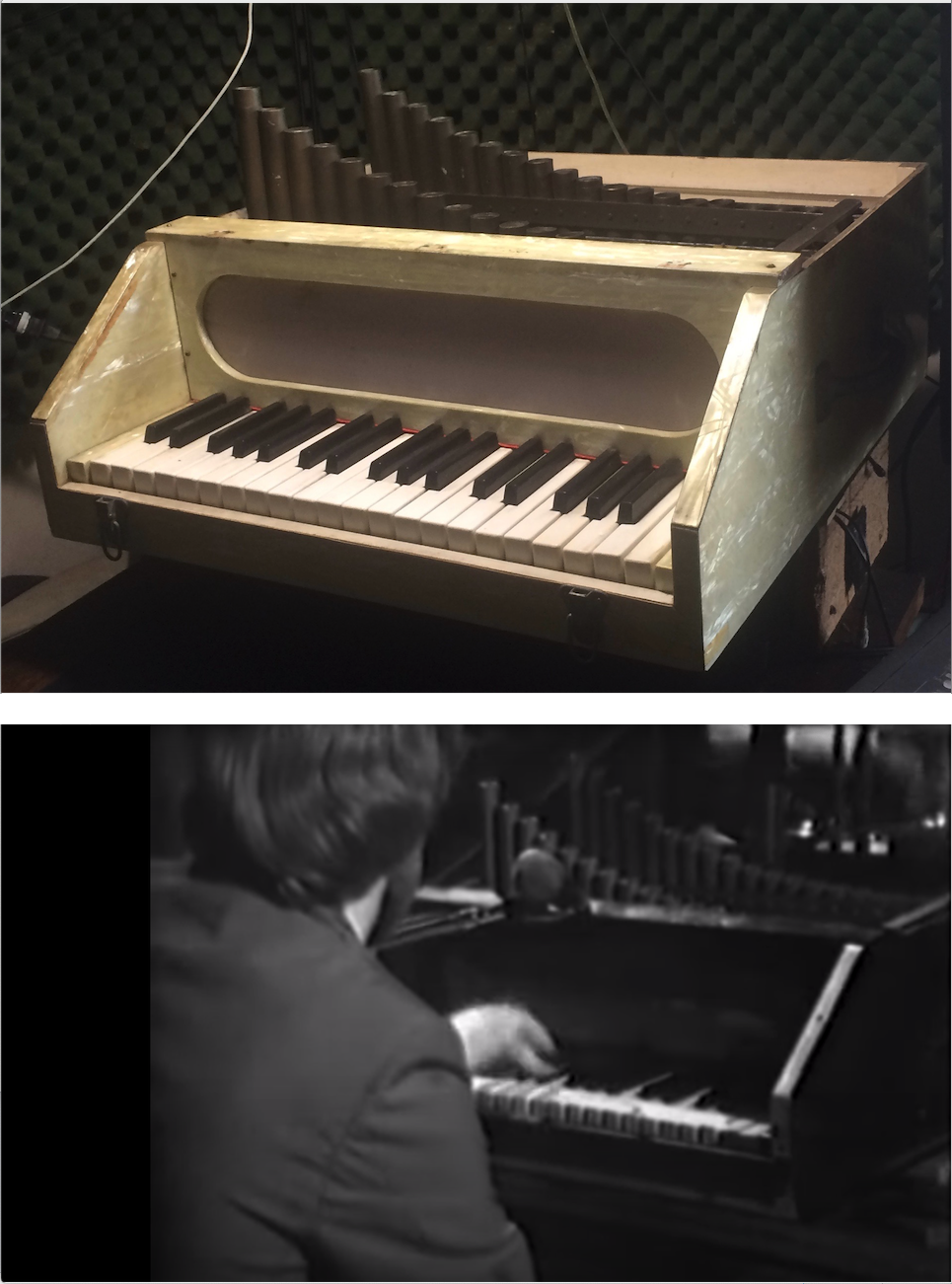
Jenco Celestette keyboard glockenspiel as used by Danny Federici

During the long time the E Street Band was inactive during the 1990s, Federici played with Country/Americana act Diamondback, releasing one record with Diamondback during this period, "Ragin Wind". Federici's haunting accordion and B3 work became an integral component of their Southern Rock sound, and he co-wrote several tracks with lead singer Franklin Jenkins. During this time Federici recorded a solo album of jazz instrumentals called Flemington, after his hometown of Flemington, New Jersey. E-Street bandmates, bassist Garry Tallent and guitarist Nils Lofgren supplied backup on the album. This was originally released on Deadeye Records (which he co-owned with Diamondback members Jenkins and Ben Arrington) then picked up by Music Masters Jazz label in 1997; it was later re-worked and re-issued as Danny Federici on Hip-O Records in 2001. Federici followed this up with a smooth jazz album Sweet, self-released on Backstreets.com in 2004; it was re-issued as Out of a Dream on V2 Records in 2005. Federici performed on other artists' records as well, including those of Joan Armatrading, Graham Parker, Gary U.S. Bonds and Garland Jeffreys.

== Illness and death ==
On November 21, 2007, it was announced that Federici would take a leave of absence from Springsteen and the E Street Band's ongoing Magic Tour to pursue treatment for melanoma, and was temporarily replaced by veteran musician Charles Giordano. Springsteen stated at the time: "Danny is one of the pillars of our sound and has played beside me as a great friend for more than 40 years. We all eagerly await his healthy and speedy return."

Federici made his only return to the stage on March 20, 2008, when he appeared for portions of a Springsteen and E Street Band performance at Conseco Fieldhouse in Indianapolis. Federici died on April 17, 2008, at the Memorial Sloan-Kettering Cancer Center in New York City, having suffered for three years with melanoma. Springsteen's album Working on a Dream is dedicated to him. Federici's final show with the band on November 19, 2007, was released as an archival recording on nugs.net. Federici was featured as soloist on organ and accordion more than he usually was, and Springsteen gives a special introduction to him, to great audience response.

== The Danny Federici Melanoma Fund ==
The Danny Federici Melanoma Fund was started after his death, and is dedicated to the research and development of treatments for melanoma through funding for clinical trials at Memorial Sloan-Kettering Cancer Center in New York. The fund also aims to help raise awareness for the disease.

On July 15, 2008, Bruce Springsteen and the E Street Band, through Columbia Records, released an EP of audio and video tracks for digital download, entitled Magic Tour Highlights, with all proceeds going to the fund. The tracks are taken from the Magic Tour, and feature a performance of "4th of July, Asbury Park (Sandy)" from Federici's final March 20 Indianapolis appearance with the band.

== Tours with Bruce Springsteen and the E Street Band ==
- Various tours, 1972–1974
- Born to Run tours, 1974–1977
- Darkness Tour, 1978–1979
- The River Tour, 1980–1981
- Born in the U.S.A. Tour, 1984–1985
- Tunnel of Love Express Tour, 1988
- Human Rights Now! Amnesty International Tour, 1988
- Bruce Springsteen and the E Street Band Reunion Tour, 1999–2000
- The Rising Tour, 2002–2003
- Vote for Change Tour, 2004
- Magic Tour, 2007–2008

== Discography ==
=== Solo releases ===
- Flemington (1997)
- Danny Federici (2001)
- Sweet (2004)
- Out of a Dream (2005)

=== Bruce Springsteen ===
- The Wild, the Innocent & the E Street Shuffle (1973)
- Born to Run (1975) (Title track only.)
- Darkness on the Edge of Town (1978)
- The River (1980)
- Born in the U.S.A. (1984)
- Live/1975–85 (1986)
- Tunnel of Love (1987)
- Chimes of Freedom (1988)
- Greatest Hits (1995)
- Blood Brothers (1996)
- Tracks (1998)
- 18 Tracks (1999)
- Live in New York City (2001)
- The Rising (2002)
- The Essential Bruce Springsteen (2003)
- Hammersmith Odeon London '75 (2006)
- Magic (2007)
- Magic Tour Highlights (2008) (Posthumous release)
- Working on a Dream (2009) (Posthumous release)
- The Promise (2010) (Posthumous release)
- High Hopes (2014) (Posthumous release)
