= Garry Tallent =

American musician, member of the E Street Band

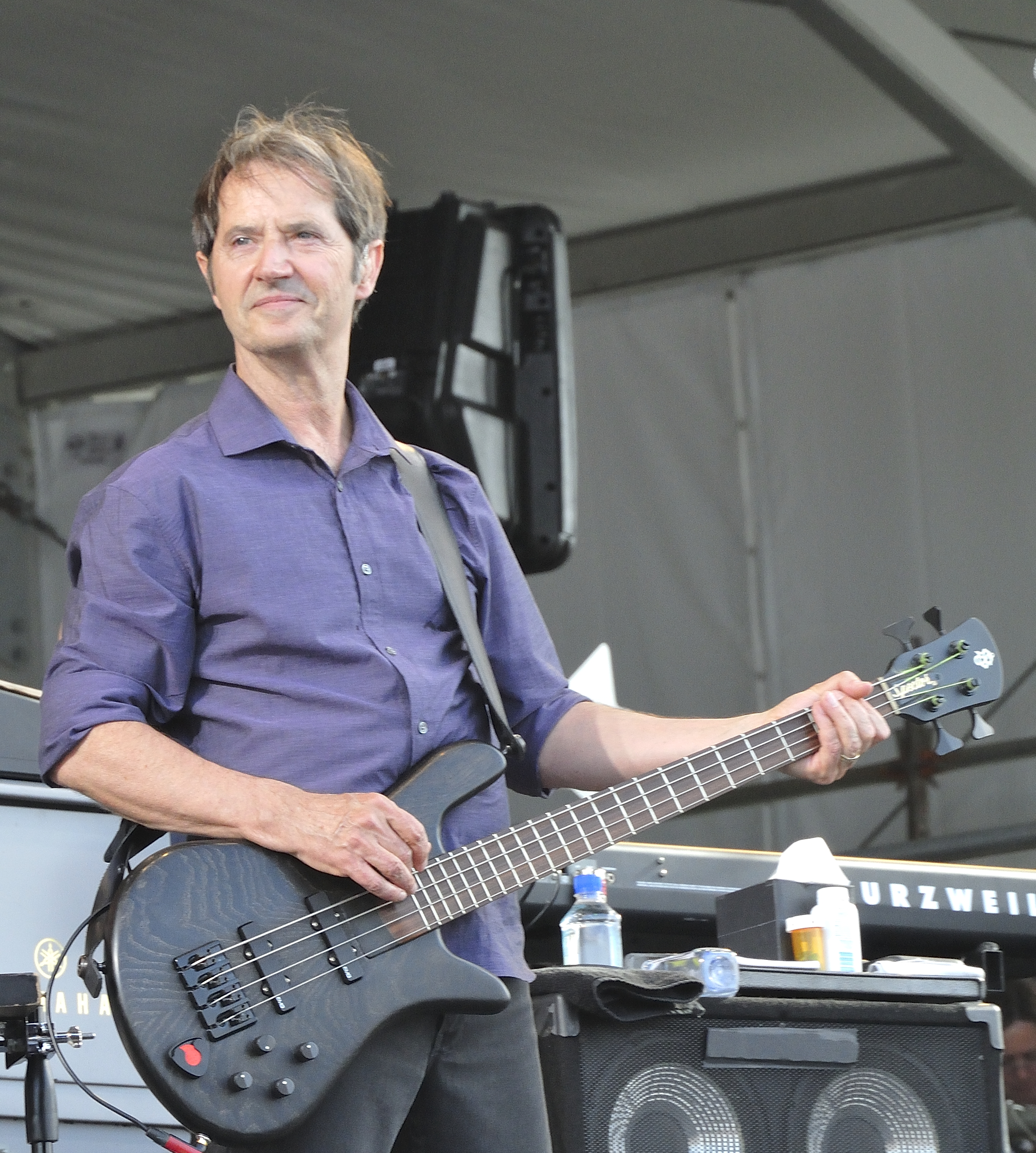
- Tallent at the 2012 New Orleans Jazz & Heritage Festival

Background information
- Born: October 27, 1949 (age 76)
- Genres: Rock
- Occupations: Musician, record producer
- Instrument: Bass guitar
- Member of: E Street Band

Garry Wayne Tallent (born October 27, 1949) is an American musician and record producer. Tallent is best known as the bass player for the E Street Band; he is a founding member of the band. In 2014, Tallent was inducted into the Rock and Roll Hall of Fame as a member of the E Street Band.

== Early life ==
Born October 27, 1949, Tallent grew up in Neptune City near the Jersey Shore. He first took up the tuba and then the bass. He attended Neptune High School along with future bandmates Southside Johnny and Vini Lopez.

== Career ==
Tallent was influenced by James Jamerson, Donald "Duck" Dunn, and Paul McCartney. He started playing with Springsteen in 1971 in two earlier bands and became a founding member of the E Street Band, which formed in 1972. Tallent is best known for being the bass player for the E Street Band.

In 1987, Tallent produced the song "Crying, Waiting, Hoping" for Marshall Crenshaw on the La Bamba soundtrack.

During the E Street Band's hiatus in the 1990s, Tallent moved to Nashville, having an affinity for country and western and rockabilly music. By that point, Tallent had already long been referred to by the nickname "The Tennessee Terror", a name given to him after once driving through Tennessee briefly on a roadtrip. There, he opened the MoonDog recording studio and helped start the D'Ville Record Group label. Tallent has produced such artists as Jim Lauderdale, Kevin Gordon, and Steve Forbert.

In 2014, Tallent was inducted into the Rock and Roll Hall of Fame as a member of the E Street Band.

In 2016, at the age of 66, Tallent released his first solo album. Entitled “Break Time,” the album was released on Tallent's D’Ville Records label.

On December 12, 2020, Springsteen and the E Street Band performed on Saturday Night Live. However, Tallent opted out of the performance due to COVID-19 pandemic concerns. This performance marked the first time that Tallent had missed a show with the E Street Band.
