= Jungleland =

1975 song by Bruce Springsteen

Song by Bruce Springsteen

from the album Born to Run
- Released: August 25, 1975
- Recorded: January 8, 1974 (first take); July 20, 1975 (completed)
- Studio: 914 Sound Studios, Blauvelt, New York; Record Plant, New York City
- Genre: Jazz rock; progressive rock
- Length: 9:33
- Label: Columbia
- Songwriter: Bruce Springsteen
- Producers: Bruce Springsteen; Mike Appel

"Jungleland" is a song by the American singer-songwriter Bruce Springsteen from his 1975 album Born to Run as its closing track. Over nine minutes in length, it contains one of the E Street Band saxophonist Clarence Clemons' most recognizable solos. It also features short-time E Streeter Suki Lahav, who performs the delicate 23-note violin introduction to the song, accompanied by Roy Bittan on piano in the opening.

== Recording ==
Though much is made of the six months it took to record the track "Born to Run", "Jungleland" was not completed until 19 months after its first rehearsal take on January 8, 1974, at 914 Sound Studios, Blauvelt, New York. It was on July 12, 1974, at The Bottom Line, New York, that Springsteen finally decided to debut it live; at this juncture it is still very much of a piece like other jazzed-up mini-operas from The Wild, The Innocent and the E Street Shuffle, influenced by David Sancious.

When the E Street Band assembled at 914 Sound Studios on August 1, 1974, it was to secure a usable basic track for "Jungleland", "already earmarked as the centrepiece of the album". The August 1 tape box suggests they cut two takes of "Jungleland", the second complete. Later that month, David Sancious and drummer Ernest "Boom" Carter gave their notice, replaced by Roy Bittan and Max Weinberg, and a violinist, Suki Lahav, who would make important contributions to "Jungleland". In the following months, "Jungleland" was played live regularly, losing its jazz influences, adding Suki's violin to the introduction, and Springsteen making many lyrical modifications.

On April 18, 1975, sessions moved to The Record Plant in New York City, with Jon Landau now co-producer, and his "keen young engineer" Jimmy Iovine, replacing Louis Lahav, who had returned to Israel with his wife, Suki, after her last show in March. Suki would appear on Born to Run by overdubs of her violin and background vocals. Final sessions took place on July 14, 19 and 20, as the lead guitar track, different vocals, and Clarence Clemons' sax solo were overdubbed. "All we could do was hold on. Smoke a lot of pot and try to stay calm," said Clemons, who spent sixteen hours playing and replaying every note of his "Jungleland" solo "in order to satisfy Bruce's bat-eared attention to sonic detail. It was time for big decisions. Like, what to do about the strings. He wisely decided, 'Once we got the guitars, I think I just wanted the thing more grittier, and the strings kinda took away some of the darkness.'"

In Born to Run, his 2016 autobiography, Springsteen describes "the album's climactic piece, the 9:23 epic "Jungleland." Here a violin prelude gives way to piano and the elegiac tale of the renegade Magic Rat and the Barefoot Girl. He writes, "From there it's all night, the city and the spiritual battleground of "Jungleland" as the band works its way through musical movement after musical movement. Then, Clarence's greatest recorded moment. That solo. One last musical ebb, and . . . "The poets down here don’t write nothing at all, they just stand back and let it all be . . . ," the knife-in-the-back wail of my vocal outro, the last sound you hear, finishes it all in bloody operatic glory. At record's end, our lovers from "Thunder Road" have had their early hard-won optimism severely tested by the streets of my noir city". Devoted Springsteen fan Melissa Etheridge praised the song to RollingStone.com, saying, "When Bruce Springsteen does those wordless wails, like at the end of 'Jungleland,' that's the definition of rock and roll to me. He uses his whole body when he sings, and he puts out this enormous amount of force and emotion and passion."

== Lyrics ==
The song in its lyrics mirrors the pattern of the entire Born to Run album, beginning with a sense of desperate hope that slides slowly into despair and defeat. The song opens with the "Magic Rat" "driving his sleek machine/over the Jersey state line" and meeting up with the "Barefoot Girl", with whom he "takes a stab at romance and disappears down Flamingo Lane". The song portrays some scenes of the city and gang life in which the Rat is involved, with occasional references to the gang's conflict with police. The last two stanzas, coming after Clemons' extended solo, describe the death of the Rat and his dream, which "guns him down" in the "tunnels uptown", and the end of the love between him and the Barefoot Girl. The song concludes with a description of the final fall of the Rat and the lack of impact his death has: "No one watches as the ambulance pulls away/Or as the girl shuts out the bedroom light," "Man, the poets down here don't write nothin' at all / They just stand back and let it all be."

Springsteen changed several lines that had been part of the song since early 1974, in the final month at the Record Plant, including, "there's a crazy kind of light tonight, brighter than the one that sparkles for prophets", which he changed in July 1975 to, "The midnight gang's assembled and picked a rendezvous for the night". Another from the second verse, was "The streets alive with tough-kid Jets in Nova-light machines, boys flash guitars like bayonets and rip holes in their jeans", until it became, "The street's alive as secret debts are paid, contacts made, they vanished unseen, Kids flash guitars just like switch-blades hustling for the record machine", also in July 1975. He changed the bridge and the final verse, "In the tunnel of machines you’ll hear the screams drowned out by the trains"; by October 1974, it became "In the tunnel of machines the magic Rat chases his dreams", and finally, by July 1975, "In the tunnels uptown, the Rat's own dream guns him down", killed by the runaway American dream.

== Accolades ==
In September 2004, Q rated "Jungleland" one of the "1010 songs you must own". In 2005, Bruce Pollock rated "Jungleland" as one of the 7,500 most important songs between 1944 and 2000. Additionally, the song is much beloved by fans and critics and continuously makes it onto lists of Springsteen's best songs.

It is ranked number 298 on Rolling Stone's list of The 500 Greatest Songs of All Time.

== Live performances ==
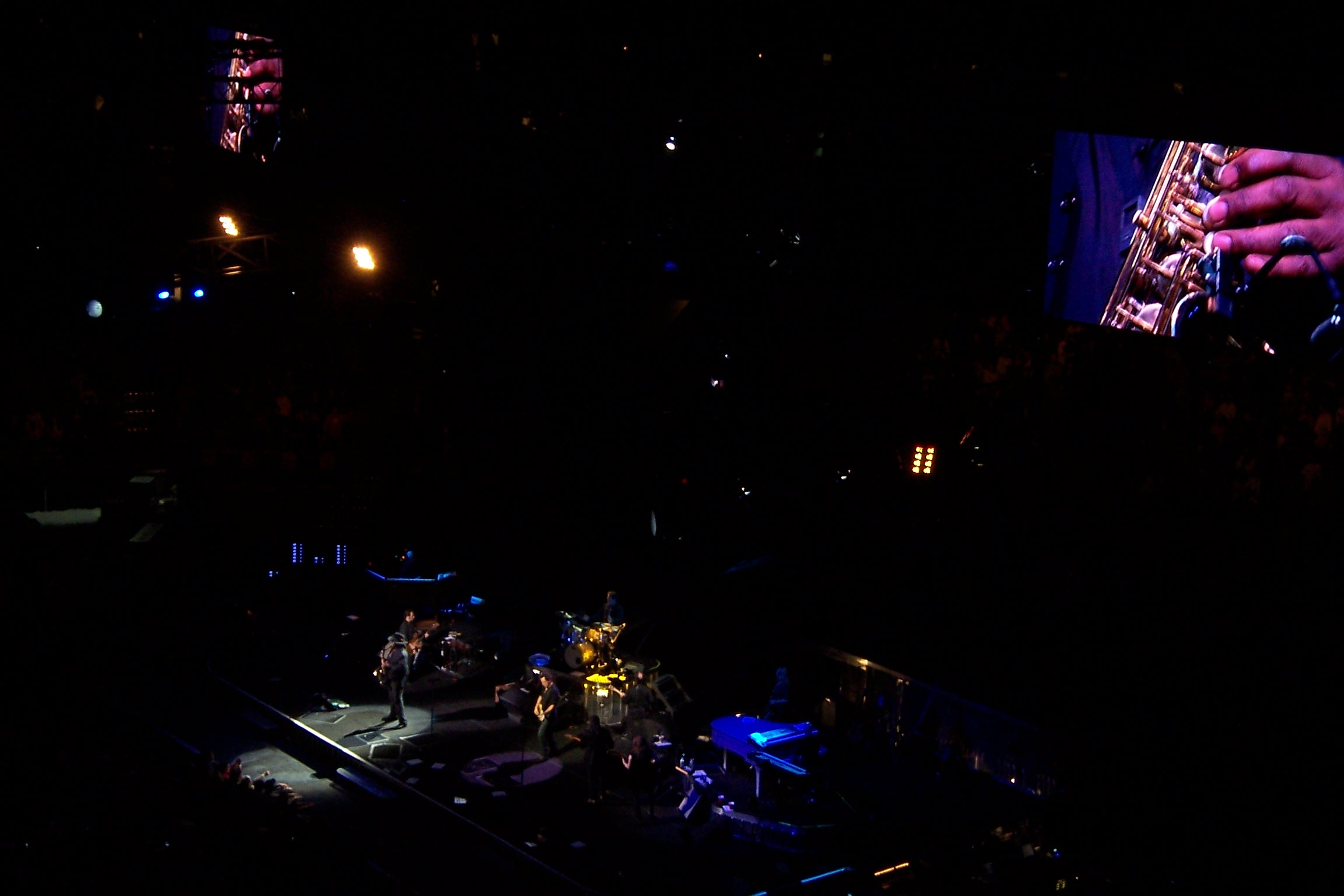
Clarence Clemons playing his signature saxophone solo on "Jungleland" at the TD Banknorth Garden, Boston, November 18, 2007 on the Magic Tour.

In concert, "Jungleland" is usually played towards the end of shows. During the E Street Band's reunion tour in 1999 and 2000, it was part of a revolving "epic" slot, alternating with "Backstreets" and "Racing in the Street". When played, it is sometimes preceded by its Born to Run predecessor, "Meeting Across the River". Its appearances were rarer during The Rising Tour. During the 2007–2008 Magic Tour, "Jungleland" was played periodically, often played every third or fourth show in a slot where it alternated with "Backstreets", "Rosalita", "Kitty's Back", or "Detroit Medley" and gaining in frequency as the tour ended. It also appeared intermittently during the 2009 Working on a Dream Tour. Its performances in 2009 became substantially more frequent later in the tour as the band began to play Born to Run in its entirety at most shows. Following the death of Clemons in 2011, the song was not played for a majority of the 2012 Wrecking Ball Tour. The song finally made its tour debut just before the end of the tour's second leg, during the second of two shows in Gothenburg, Sweden on July 28, 2012. In a hugely emotional moment Clemons' nephew Jake Clemons performed the signature saxophone solo, occupying Clarence's usual spot on the stage. After the song, both Springsteen and Roy Bittan gave Jake a hug.

== In popular culture ==
John Malkovich used the song, among a nearly all-Springsteen theatrical soundtrack, in his 1980s Steppenwolf Theater production of Lanford Wilson's play, Balm in Gilead. It served as the background for a choreographed tableau of street denizens miming a tragic slice-of-life.

The American educational children's program Sesame Street featured a parody of Springsteen about addition called "Born to Add", which though ostensibly a parody of "Born to Run", is more musically and lyrically reminiscent of "Jungleland".

The post-apocalyptic horror/fantasy novel The Stand by Stephen King opens with three epigraphs, one of which is the final lyrics from the song.

== Personnel ==
According to authors Philippe Margotin and Jean-Michel Guesdon:

- Bruce Springsteen – vocals, guitar
- Garry Tallent – bass guitar
- Max Weinberg – drums
- Roy Bittan – piano, organ
- Clarence Clemons – tenor saxophone
- Suki Lahav – violin
- Charles Calello – string arrangements
- Unknown musicians – strings
