= Night Moves (Bob Seger song) =

1976 single

- Picture sleeve for the 1976 West German single

Single by Bob Seger & The Silver Bullet Band

from the album Night Moves
- B-side: "Ship of Fools"
- Released: November 1976
- Recorded: 1976; Nimbus Nine Studios, Toronto, Ontario
- Genre: Heartland rock; soft rock
- Length: 5:25 (album version); 3:20 (single version)
- Label: Capitol
- Songwriter: Bob Seger
- Producers: Bob Seger; Punch Andrews

Bob Seger & The Silver Bullet Band singles chronology
"Nutbush City Limits" (1976)	"Night Moves" (1976)	"Mainstreet" (1977)

Alternative release
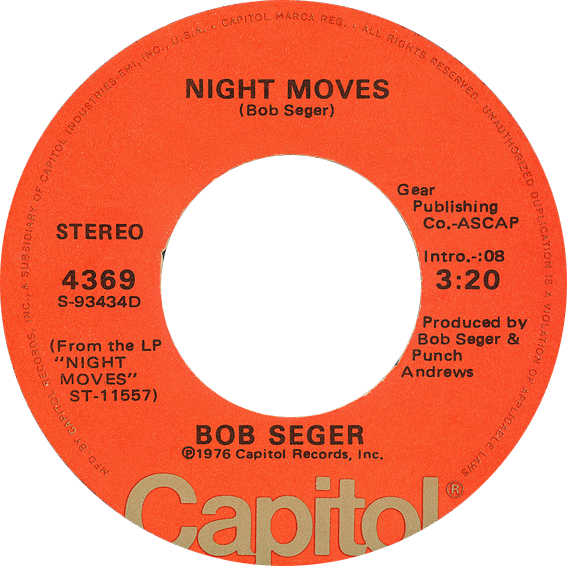
- Side A of the 1976 US single

Music video
- "Night Moves" (1994) on YouTube

"Night Moves" is a song by the American singer-songwriter Bob Seger. It was the lead single from his ninth studio album, Night Moves, (1976), released on Capitol Records. Seger wrote the song as a coming of age tale about adolescent love and adult memory of it. It was based on Seger's teenage love affair, which he experienced in the early 1960s. It took him six months to write and was recorded quickly at Nimbus Nine Studios in Toronto, Ontario, with producer Jack Richardson. As much of Seger's Silver Bullet Band had returned home by this point, the song was recorded with several local session musicians.

Released as a single in December 1976, it reached number four on the Billboard Hot 100, becoming Seger's first hit single since "Ramblin' Gamblin' Man" from 1969. It also charted at number five in Canada and was a top 25 hit in Australia. The song changed Seger from a popular regional favorite to a national star.

== Background ==
"Night Moves" has roots in Seger's adolescence; he wrote the song to capture the "freedom and looseness" he experienced during that period. At a certain point, he began socializing with a rougher crowd, who thought he was cool because he played music. The song's contents are largely autobiographical; for example, the group of friends would often hold parties they called "grassers", which involved going to a farmer's field outside Ann Arbor to dance. Through these, he met a woman—credited as Rene Andretti in the Encyclopedia of Great Popular Song Recordings—whose boyfriend was in the military and was away. "It's about this dark haired Italian girl that I went out with when I was 19, she was one year older than me," he later recalled. He pursued a romance with the woman, but eventually her boyfriend returned, and they married, leaving Seger broken-hearted. He later told journalist Timothy White that many of his early songs were written to impress the girl.

The song took Seger six months to complete writing. He had recently purchased a house due to the success of his first live album, Live Bullet, and he and the band would write and practice in its large basement. The ending lyrics were written first. The use of descriptive imagery was inspired by Kris Kristofferson's "Me and Bobby McGee" (1969), a song that Seger loved and which motivated him as he was developing his writing style. The catalyst for writing "Night Moves" came after he saw the 1973 film American Graffiti: "I came out of the theater thinking, 'Hey, I've got a story to tell, too! Nobody has ever told about how it was to grow up in my neck of the woods.'" He was inspired by the film's depictions of early 1960s car culture, of which he was a part. A 1996 article in The Detroit News claims that he wrote portions of the song while at an A&W drive-in restaurant in Ann Arbor, Michigan. He was inspired by the example of Bruce Springsteen's "Jungleland" to include two bridges in "Night Moves."

== Recording and production ==
"Night Moves"
A sample of "Night Moves", wherein Seger describes adolescent memories and sings the song's chorus.

"Night Moves" was recorded at Nimbus Nine Studios in Toronto, Ontario. Seger and the Silver Bullet Band had gone there for three days to record a few tracks with The Guess Who's producer Jack Richardson at the request of Seger's manager, who wanted him to produce a more "commercial" song. The band quickly recorded two Seger originals and a cover of the Motown hit "My World Is Empty Without You", but before Seger left on the third day, he composed a fourth song to record. He had been "waiting on the right moment" to record "Night Moves", as he feared a saxophone, performed by Alto Reed, would not complement it, and that lead guitarist Drew Abbott's playing would not be satisfactory. Richardson remembered Seger first playing the song at a piano in his office, though Seger did not feel it was good enough to record. Seger instead remembered that Richardson was not sold on the song at first. As the only members of the Silver Bullet Band still in Toronto were bassist Chris Campbell and drummer Charlie Allen Martin (plus Seger on acoustic guitar and piano), Richardson recruited Joe Miquelon to play electric guitar and Doug Riley to perform organ. At the same time, Sharon Lee Williams, Rhonda Silver, and Laurel Ward and Tracy Richardson sang the song's trademark backing vocals.

The song was completed in fewer than ten takes, with the session dispersing momentarily to record the bridge section that consisted solely of Seger and a guitar. Paul Cotton of Poco was brought in to record a guitar solo that was later edited out, though the last notes of it are faintly audible preceding the last verse. The team stayed at the studio until 2:30 in the morning to get the song right. After Richardson and engineer Brian Christian mixed the tracks, Richardson said he received a call from Seger's manager/producer Punch Andrews expressing dissatisfaction with the tracks. Andrews noted that Capitol Records had been equally disappointed. A few months later, when Richardson was talking to a Capitol A&R executive, he asked about the Seger sessions and was told "both tracks" were potential B-sides. It turned out that Seger and Andrews had never given "Night Moves" to Capitol, so Richardson did, and after hearing it, Capitol made it the title track of Seger's next album, as well as the first single.

== Composition ==
"I really liked the title because it was two-edged. It had a duality to it. "Workin' on our night moves"—our moves with girls—and "Ain't it funny how the night moves"—what you remember as you're getting older."

— Seger in 2015 reflecting on the song

"Night Moves" is a mid-tempo number that starts quietly with acoustic guitar. Bass and drums are introduced as the song's setting is described: 1962, cornfields, '60 Chevy. While Seger actually owned a 1962 Chevy, he felt "'60" flowed better in the song. Seger uses the word "points" in verse one to reference his pointed boots and his love interest's breasts. An intense summertime teenaged love affair is described as knowingly more sexual than romantic, with short instrumental lines breaking the evocative imagery, sometimes in mid-sentence. Piano, backing vocals, electric guitar, and organ are added as the song's emotional nostalgia builds momentum. Then suddenly, it stops, as the narrative flashes forward to some period in the future, where he hums a song from 1962. Seger has claimed in interviews that he was referencing the song "Be My Baby" by the Ronettes, though that song was released one year later. To a quiet acoustic guitar, the narrator, awakened by a clap of thunder and unable to fall back asleep, ponders a different sense of the title phrase. Seger said this passage was inspired by late-night self-analysis and "the uncertainty night represents": "I was thinking about the whole aura of nighttime, the four o'clock in the morning moment when you assess yourself, check your weaknesses." The rest of the instruments fall back in for an extended coda vamp of the chorus.

Richardson said that "the whole arrangement came together in the studio." The decision for an unusual bridge (consisting of three separate movements) was inspired by the Bruce Springsteen song "Jungleland". He credited that song, in addition to the Born to Run album, with helping him complete the song: "He had like a multiple bridge, he had various different things going on, and I thought to myself, 'That's how I'll finish 'Night Moves.'"

To Rolling Stone critic Dave Marsh, the coda after the false ending takes the song beyond the realm of nostalgia to turn it into a complete story covering both the past and the present. According to Marsh, the song could be "about the sexual discovery embodied in the verses, or the sense of loss and nostalgia captured in its coda. Or you could say that the Bob Seger story really took place in the long silence between them, from the moment he began to play to the moment, fifteen years later, when he was finally widely heard." Marsh also states that the characters in "Night Moves" are more realistic than those in American Graffiti in that the characters in "Night Moves" do not pretend to expect fidelity when pursuing sex, and that the coda reveals how "trivial such a crucial moment" becomes years later.

Seger described writing the song:

It was inspired by the movie American Graffiti. It was all about cars and peg pants and rolled-up T-shirts with a cigarette pack up here and stiletto pointed shoes. That's how I grew up, that was my high-school years. It was the easiest song in the world to write but the hardest song to finish. It took me six months to finish it. I had the first two verses. Then I'm listening to Born To Run and I notice in "Jungleland" Bruce had a double bridge. I never thought of two bridges in one song. So I have two bridges in "Night Moves." People at Capitol Records told me after they heard the song "Night Moves" that I had a 'career record". They said: "This is a song that you're gonna have to play for the rest of your life."

== Chart performance ==
"Night Moves" was a commercial success in the United States. It debuted on the Billboard Hot 100 chart during the week of December 11, 1976 at number 85, gradually rising over the ensuing weeks to a peak of number four on March 12, 1977, a position it held for two weeks. "Night Moves" was Seger's first single to chart in the top ten on the Billboard Hot 100. In total, it spent 21 weeks on the chart. In Canada, the song debuted on RPM's Top Singles chart at number 93 in the issue dated December 18, 1976, eventually rising over twelve weeks to a peak of number five on March 12, 1977.

The song also charted in Australasian territories: in Australia, it peaked at number 25 on the national charts, and in New Zealand, it reached a peak of number 39. The song did not chart in the United Kingdom until 1995, when it peaked at a position of 45 on April 30, 1995.

== Reception ==
"Night Moves" received critical acclaim. Timothy White of Crawdaddy felt "the genius of the song [...] is the way Seger changes the meaning of the phrase 'night moves,' from a reference to making out, to a comment on the passage of time." Billboard described "Night Moves" as having a similar feel and theme to Van Morrison's "Wild Night," stating that the theme was "the earthy yearnings of adolescence" and saying that Seger matched Bruce Springsteen and Rod Stewart in vocal expressiveness. Cash Box said that the song is "based on standard, emotive rock 'n' roll chords played on acoustic guitar, dressed up with keyboards, a soulful backing chorus and of course Seger's throaty voice." Los Angeles Times critic Robert Hilburn said that "this Van Morrison-influenced slice back-seat sensuality" may be the song to return Seger to the Top 10 after an 8 year absence. In his 1979 volume Stranded: Rock and Roll for a Desert Island, famed rock critic Greil Marcus selected the single "Night Moves" for inclusion on same, writing simply: "The mystic chords of memory." Paul Evans, in The New Rolling Stone Album Guide, writes: "[It] is not only Seger's best song, but one of rock's most moving exercises in elegy."

For his part, Seger has claimed that "Night Moves" is his favorite song he ever wrote, and he continued to try and replicate it years afterward.

=== Accolades ===
"Night Moves" was named by Rolling Stone as Best Single of the Year for 1977 and was included in their list of the 500 Greatest Songs of All Time at No. 301. The Rock and Roll Hall of Fame named it one of the 500 Songs That Shaped Rock and Roll, Seger's only such selection.

== Music video ==
Filmmaker Gary Weis produced an unofficial music video for "Night Moves" that aired on Saturday Night Live in January 1977.

In 1994, nearly 20 years after the original song was released, an official accompanying music video was released. Directed by Wayne Isham, it was set in a drive-in movie theater in the early 1960s; it interspersed footage of Seger performing in a present-day version of the drive-in (seemingly, now abandoned) with various vignettes featuring characters described in the song. Matt LeBlanc, a friend of Isham's, was in the starring role before his debut in Friends; he later claimed that he was drunk through the whole video, as Seger had shared a bottle of tequila with him in the musician's motorhome immediately before the shoot. Also featured in the video was Daphne Zuniga of Melrose Place. In the video, Zuniga's dark, edgy young woman becomes an object of visual fascination for LeBlanc's clean-cut young man. Johnny Galecki and Natasha Gregson Wagner also appear in the video as a young couple.

== Personnel ==
Credits are adapted from Mix and The Wall Street Journal.

- Bob Seger – lead vocals, acoustic guitar

The Silver Bullet Band

- Chris Campbell – bass
- Charlie Allen Martin – drums, tambourine, maracas

Additional musicians

- Paul Cotton – guitar solo (edited out of final mix)
- Joe Miquelon – electric guitar
- Doug Riley – piano, organ
- Rhonda Silver – backing vocals
- Laurel Ward – backing vocals
- Sharon Lee Williams – backing vocals

Production

- Jack Richardson – producer

== In popular culture ==
The rotoscope film American Pop concludes with the final main character, Pete Belinsky, portrayed by actor Ron Thompson, playing the song as his one opportunity to become a professional musician. The performance is a piano-oriented interpretation of "Night Moves" that has never been commercially released.

In 1995 and 1996, the song was used in the closing credits of TNN's broadcast of The Winston.

The song can be heard twice during the first season of The O.C. Bob Seger is one of the character, Julie's, favorite singers.

How I Met Your Mother, Season 5 episode 20 called Home Wreckers, the song is playing on the radio as Barney drives Ted's mother to the airport and seduces her.

"Night Moves" was referenced in the popular NBC sitcom 30 Rock in the nineteenth episode of Season Three. Liz Lemon sings "Workin' on my Night Cheese!" as she consumes a one-pound brick of what appears to be cheddar cheese. It has also been reported that the purchase of the broadcast rights to "Night Moves" was required for the scene, reportedly costing the network as much as $50,000.

The song is also featured in the video game Grand Theft Auto V, on one of the game's fictional radio stations, Los Santos Rock Radio.

The song also appeared in the TV series Supernatural in the fourth episode of Season Eleven entitled "Baby".

== Chart history ==
=== Weekly charts ===
Chart (1976–1977)	Peak position
Australia (Kent Music Report)	25
Canada RPM Top Singles	5
New Zealand (Recorded Music NZ)	39
US Billboard Hot 100	4
US Cash Box Top 100	6

=== Year-end charts ===
Chart (1977)	Rank
Canada	64
US Billboard Hot 100	55
US Cash Box	33

Chart (1995)	Peak position
Scottish Singles Sales (Official Charts)	34
UK Singles (Official Charts)	45

== Certifications ==
Region	Certification	Certified units/sales
New Zealand (RMNZ)	2× Platinum	60,000^{‡}
United States (RIAA)	2× Platinum	2,000,000^{‡}
^{‡} Sales+streaming figures based on certification alone.
