= Mainstreet =

Single by Bob Seger & The Silver Bullet Band

from the album Night Moves
- B-side: "Jody Girl" (US); "Come to Poppa" (UK)
- Released: April 1977
- Genre: Soft rock; heartland rock; pop rock
- Length: 3:43
- Label: Capitol
- Songwriter: Bob Seger
- Producers: Bob Seger, Muscle Shoals Rhythm Section

Bob Seger & The Silver Bullet Band singles chronology
"Night Moves" (1976)	"Mainstreet" (1977)	"Rock and Roll Never Forgets" (1977)

Colored vinyl issue
- Limited edition release

"Mainstreet" is a song written and recorded by Bob Seger & The Silver Bullet Band. It was released in April 1977 as the second single from the album Night Moves (1976). The song peaked at number 24 on the U.S. Billboard Hot 100 and has become a staple of classic rock radio; it also reached number one on the Canadian Singles Chart.

== Lyrics and music ==
Seger has stated that the street he was singing about is Ann Street, just off Main Street in Ann Arbor, Michigan, where he grew up. There was a pool hall there where they had girls dancing in the window and R&B bands playing on the weekends. He said, "Again, that's going back to the 'Night Moves' situation where I was writing about my high school years in Ann Arbor and what it was like — the discovery, the total naivete and fresh–faced openness that I went through. It was sort of an entire awakening of my life; before that I was kind of a quiet, lonesome kid."

Seger later expanded on the origins of the song:

Just like "Night Moves," that song rings true. What do they tell you about writing? They say you have to write about what you know. I grew up near that street corner. My older brother was a lot of trouble and I was not. My parents always called me "the good one" and they said: "You're the one we can trust." So at age 10, 11, 12 I was able to walk through Ann Arbor until midnight if I felt like it.

There was a club, and this blues band from Chicago named Washboard Willie was playing there. In the window of this club there were people dancing, and occasionally there would be a beautiful girl dancing in the window. And at my age you were starting to wake up to girls. I would sit out there and watch through the window and listen to this great R&B. I'm looking and I'm listening and thinking this is what I wanna do with my life.

The club was very lively, and to a 12, 13-year-old that was pretty cool. I loved the groove because it's Chicago blues, and the women are dancing and you're starting to think the women are looking pretty good. So all that stuff ended up becoming the elements for the song "Mainstreet."

Ultimate Classic Rock critic Jed Gottlieb cites "Mainstreet" as an example of Seger's love for "beautiful losers". He notes that Seger sings about a "dancer in a downtown dive" rather than the waitresses, prom queens, or college girls who would be the subject of other singers' songs. Gottlieb further notes that, unlike in their songs, the singer doesn't try to save or run away with the girl; he is content to just watch her walk on by him.

Billboard felt that the imagery used by the singer to remember his love for the bar dancer was reminiscent of Van Morrison. Billboard also found the organ counterpoint to be "clever". Cash Box compared it to "Night Moves" saying that "this haunting ballad hits home with the same emotive chording, expressive vocalization and dramatic close." Record World said that it focuses on "Seger's mellower, more introspective side."

Classic Rock History critic Janey Roberts rated it as Seger's 7th best song, calling it "an ode to the romantic backstreets of hope and despair found on Springsteen's classic 1975 work [Born to Run]."

It is in the key of E♭. During live performances, the iconic Pete Carr guitar intro was replaced with a sax intro.

== Personnel ==
Credits are adapted from the liner notes of Seger's 1994 Greatest Hits compilation.

- Bob Seger – lead vocals

Muscle Shoals Rhythm Section

- Barry Beckett – keyboards
- Pete Carr – lead guitar, acoustic guitar
- Roger Hawkins – drums, percussion
- David Hood – bass
- Jimmy Johnson – rhythm guitar

== Reception ==
Cash Box called the song a "haunting ballad" that "hits home with the same emotive chording, expressive vocalization and dramatic close" as "Night Moves". VH1's Mike McPadden selected "Mainstreet" as one of Seger's 10 most essential songs, describing it as "sad, sweet, soulful, and even spooky" for how it evokes the emotions of a hopeful but frustrated young man watching a woman he is too scared to approach. McPadden particularly praises the keyboard playing for how it complements the song's "melancholy" mood. Classic Rock History contributor Janey Roberts also selected "Mainstreet" as one of Seger's top 10 songs, particularly praising the opening guitar line and describing the song as an "ode to the romantic backstreets of hope and despair" found on Bruce Springsteen's Born to Run.

== Chart performance ==
=== Weekly charts ===
Chart (1977)	Peak position
Canadian RPM Singles	1
U.S. Billboard Hot 100	24
U.S. Cash Box Top 100	19

=== Year-end charts ===
Chart (1977)	Rank
Canada	52
U.S. (Joel Whitburn's Pop Annual)	152

== Certifications ==
Region	Certification	Certified units/sales
New Zealand (RMNZ)	Gold	15,000^{‡}
United States (RIAA)	Gold	500,000^{‡}
^{‡} Sales+streaming figures based on certification alone.
