= Suki Lahav =

Israeli violinist, vocalist and actress (1951–2026)

Tzruya "Suki" Lahav צרויה להב
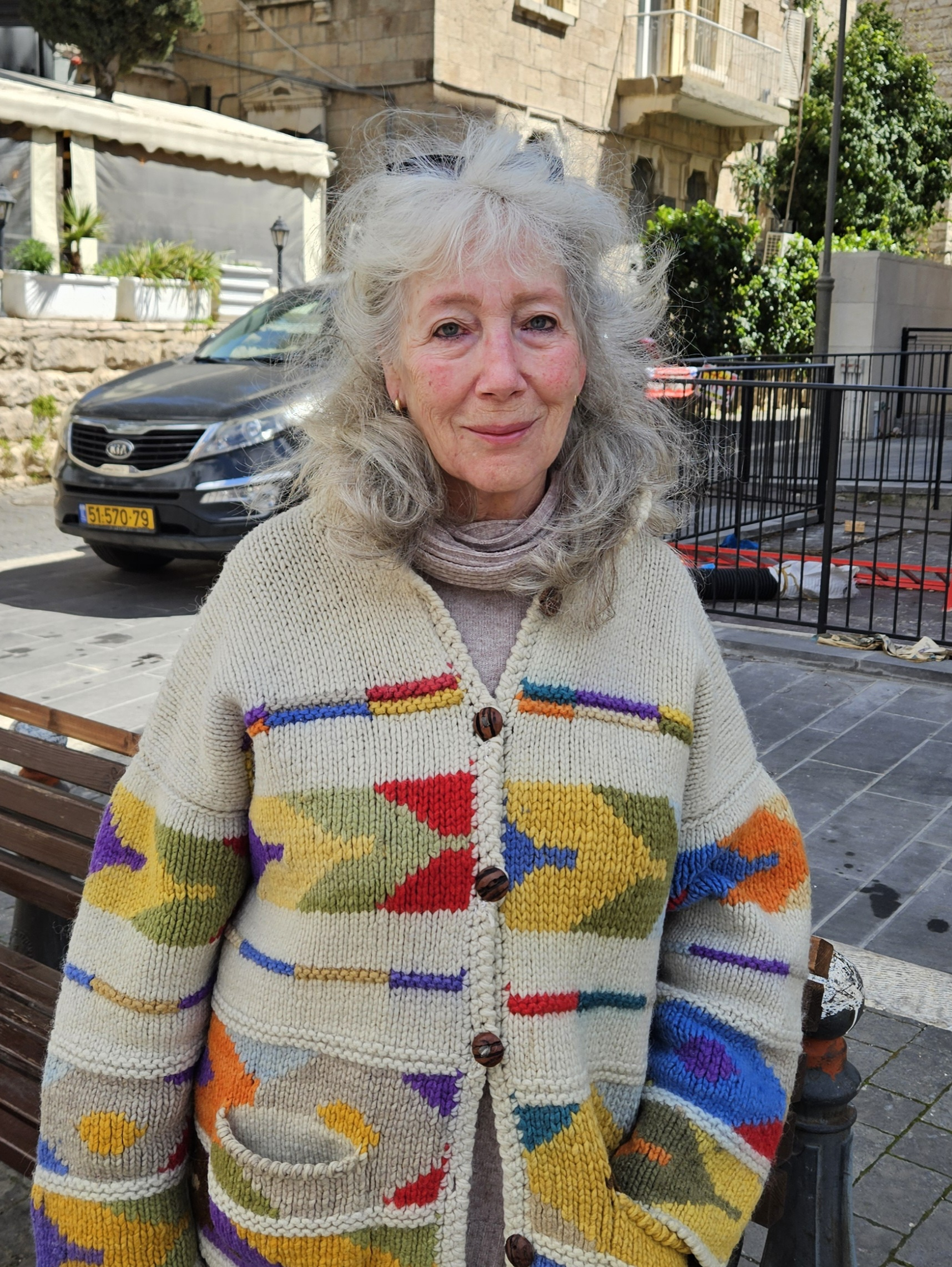
- Lahav near her home in Jerusalem in 2024

Background information
- Born: 16 July 1951; Ayelet HaShahar, Israel
- Died: 1 April 2026 (aged 74) Jerusalem, Israel
- Occupations: Violinist; vocalist; actress; lyricist; screenwriter; novelist
- Instruments: Violin; vocals
- Partner: Moshe Albalek
- Children: 2

Tzruya (or Tsruya) Hefri (later known as "Suki" Lahav) (Hebrew: צרויה להב; 16 July 1951 – 1 April 2026) was an Israeli violinist, vocalist, actress, lyricist, screenwriter, and novelist. She was a member of Bruce Springsteen's E Street Band from September 1974 to March 1975, then returned to Israel and found success there.

== Life and career ==
Tzruya Lahav was born in Ayelet HaShahar in northern Israel and grew up there playing kibbutz harvest music as well as classical music.

=== 1970s and 1980s ===
After her service in the Israeli military, she arrived in the United States in 1971 with her husband Louis Lahav, a recording engineer who in 1972 began working with Springsteen, who in turn was looking for a violinist. On record with Springsteen, most of Suki Lahav's parts did not make it to released form, but she sang the choir-like vocals on "4th of July, Asbury Park (Sandy)" from the album The Wild, The Innocent and The E Street Shuffle and played violin on "Jungleland" from the Born to Run album. In concert, her violin playing was a focal point of slow songs during Springsteen's shows of this time, and her "pale" "willowy" presence on stage contrasted with his. While Louis and Tzruya Lahav were in the U.S., their daughter, Tal was born. Tal was killed in a road accident at the age of three and a half. They returned to Israel in the spring of 1975.

The couple divorced in 1977. Tzruya Lahav, now known by her Hebrew name Tzruya (or sometimes transliterated as Tsruya), was briefly married to the actor Shabtai Konorti. After they divorced, she established a family with Moshe Albalek in Jerusalem. By 1985, she had two children and little involvement in the music industry. Then she began working as a violinist and violist, appearing with the Israeli Kibbutz Orchestra, and in parts as an actress.

=== 1990s and 2000s ===
Lahav became a successful lyricist, writing for prominent musicians and singers in Israel; "Shara Barkhovot" ("Singing in the Streets"), the Israeli entry in the Eurovision Song Contest 1990 performed by Rita, featured her words, and some of her songs are considered icons of Israeli music. She also recast existing song lyrics from other languages into Hebrew, such as the Leonard Cohen song "Famous Blue Raincoat" in 1993. In 1999, she wrote the lyrics for the multi-ethnic collaborative, Glykeria's recording "Tfilat Ha'imahot" ("The Mothers' Prayer"), which also featured Amal Murkus and Yehudit Tamir. In 2003, the album No Longer the Sea: A Collection Of Tzruya Lahav's Songs was released, featuring performances by Rita, Yehudit Ravitz, Meir Banai, Yehuda Poliker, and others. Her songs have also been performed by Israeli artists Gidi Gov, Rami Kleinstein, and Riki Gal. In 2004, a show of Lahav's songs was produced in Tel Aviv.

She wrote screenplays including Kesher Dam (1996) a crime film; and two novels: Andre's Wooden Clogs (Kinneret, 2002), based on the true-life story of a boy's survival of the Holocaust in the Netherlands (in Hebrew, also translated to Dutch and Italian ), and The Swamp Queen Does The Tango (Am Oved, 2004), an adult fairy tale (in Hebrew). Both books won many awards and prizes for literature including the Yad Vashem Prize and the Minister of Culture's prize for first work. She taught creative writing in Jerusalem, where she lived in the German Colony neighborhood.

=== Death ===
Lahav died in Jerusalem on 1 April 2026 at the age of 74. E Street Band drummer Max Weinberg paid tribute to Lahav, saying, "The bond we forged grew stronger and stronger as we toured throughout the U.S. Northeast and Midwest during the fall of 1974. Suki, Louie, and Tal, their beautiful young daughter who received her own nickname, Scooter, were there along with the rest of us striving to spread what Bruce has always called the 'Ministry of Rock and Roll,' E Street style." Springsteen released his own statement, saying, "Here on E Street, we're heartbroken over the passing of Suki Lahav. Her angelic voice shone on '4th of July, Asbury Park (Sandy)' and her beautiful violin brought great drama to the 'Jungleland' intro. She also blessed our stage with her beauty and grace in our early touring days."

== Sources ==
- Steven Allan; Interview with Suki Lahav; Backstreets magazine, December 1985
- Cross, Charles R.; Backstreets: Springsteen - The Man and His Music; Harmony Books, 1989/1992; ISBN 0-517-58929-X
- Graff, Gary; The Ties That Bind: Bruce Springsteen A to E to Z; Visible Ink Press, 2005; ISBN 1-578-59157-0
