= Meeting Across the River =

Song by Bruce Springsteen

from the album Born to Run
- A-side: "Born to Run"
- Released: August 25, 1975
- Recorded: July 18, 1975
- Studio: The Record Plant (New York City)
- Genre: Rock, jazz rock
- Length: 3:18
- Label: Columbia Records
- Songwriter: Bruce Springsteen
- Producers: Bruce Springsteen, Jon Landau and Mike Appel

"Meeting Across the River" is the seventh track on Bruce Springsteen's 1975 album, Born to Run; it also appeared as the B-side of "Born to Run", the lead single from that album. The song is often paired with "Jungleland" in concert, though without the Randy Brecker trumpet part from the record and with regular bass guitarist Garry Tallent.

== Description ==
The song is a dark character sketch featuring a soft, haunting trumpet played by Randy Brecker, piano backing from E Street Band member Roy Bittan and upright bass from jazz veteran Richard Davis. Brecker's jazz-inspired horn part adds poignancy to the song and suggests a film noir feel. The lyrical, understated track forms a bridge between the uptempo "She's the One" and the album's epic finale, "Jungleland". It also forms a bridge between the New Jersey–based songs throughout the Born to Run album and the New York City setting of "Jungleland". Presumably, the men in "Meeting Across the River" are heading through "the tunnel" under the Hudson River from New Jersey to New York to meet their connection.

The lyrics describe a low-level criminal, down on his luck but with one last chance at success for him and his friend, Eddie, that involves meeting a man across the river. Springsteen portrays his characters sympathetically. The narrator appears to be desperate; he needs to borrow some money and a ride from Eddie, and his girlfriend is threatening to leave because he has pawned her radio. The details are vague, but the consequences if they fail at their task seem to be very serious, and the song's sombre tone does not imply that they will succeed. The lyrics also imply that the man has never really been qualified for crime; however, the promise of a $2,000 payoff, and the thought that this might make his girlfriend stay with him, have caused him to get in over his head. Original pressings of Born to Run billed the song as "The Heist", suggesting the man across the river is paying the narrator and Eddie to commit a robbery. "Meeting Across the River" is in some ways similar in theme to The Velvet Underground's "I'm Waiting for the Man", which depicts a drug deal in New York City.

== Personnel ==
According to authors Philippe Margotin and Jean-Michel Guesdon:

- Bruce Springsteen – vocals
- Roy Bittan – piano
- Richard Davis – double bass
- Randy Brecker – trumpet

== Covers ==
The song was covered by Syd Straw in 1997.
