= Rock and Roll Never Forgets =

Single by Bob Seger & The Silver Bullet Band

from the album Night Moves
- B-side: "The Fire Down Below" (US); "Ship of Fools" (UK)
- Released: June 1977
- Genre: Heartland rock
- Length: 3:52 (album version); 3:27 (single version)
- Label: Capitol
- Songwriter: Bob Seger
- Producers: Bob Seger, Punch Andrews

Bob Seger & The Silver Bullet Band singles chronology
"Mainstreet" (1977)	"Rock and Roll Never Forgets" (1977)	"Still the Same" (1978)

"Rock and Roll Never Forgets" is a song written by American singer-songwriter Bob Seger. The song first appeared as the opening track on Seger's ninth studio album Night Moves (1976). The song was released in early 1977 as the third and final single from the album. The song peaked at No. 41 on the Billboard Hot 100, charting less successfully than the previous two singles. Nevertheless, "Rock and Roll Never Forgets" remains popular with Seger fans, and has become a staple of classic rock radio.

== Background ==
According to Seger, he wrote this song after attending a high school reunion. "I wanted to just write an honest appraisal of where I was at that moment in time," he said. "I was 31 years old and I was damn glad to be here." The song is accompanied by a mid-tempo sound and Seger's signature raspy vocals.

Seger expanded:

A song like "Rock 'n' Roll Never Forgets" is just slammin’. When we play that song live people go nuts. At that point in my life I was 31 years old. And the first 10 or 11 years in my career I was making six, eight grand a year and just doin’ it because I loved the music. So I’m writing for Night Moves and I just felt grateful; here I am and I’m starting to make it. You know, rock ’n’ roll never forgets. You build up goodwill over 10 years and you set the stage. "Rock 'n' Roll Never Forgets" is a grateful song. I’m grateful to all the people I played for in those small clubs, on the top of cafeteria tables, in gymnasiums and in hockey rinks. Suddenly all those people came out and bought my records and said: “I remember him. I saw him at the high school or hockey rink.”

The song is about aging and the ongoing power of rock music. The song advises the 31 year old listener to return to the rock 'n' roll she loved when she was 16. The song also serves as a tribute to Chuck Berry, who is mentioned in the line "Well all of Chuck's children are out there playing his licks/Get into your kicks/Come back baby rock and roll never forgets."

== Personnel ==
Credits are adapted from the liner notes of Seger's 2003 Greatest Hits 2 compilation.

- Bob Seger – lead vocals

The Silver Bullet Band

- Drew Abbott – guitar
- Chris Campbell – bass
- Charlie Allen Martin – drums
- Alto Reed – saxophone
- Robyn Robbins – piano, organ

== Reception ==
Rolling Stone praised the song as "no-bullshit, horn-slathered Silver Bullet crunch with a nod to Chuck Berry (who is name-checked in the last verse) – makes the case for rock's longevity as well as the lyrics do." Billboard said that the "standard riffs played at intense energy levels by the rhythm section make an almost ironic counterpoint to the Van Morrison-type lyrics about the funky fun of the golden days of young rock music." Cash Box said that it "rocks the hardest [among the Night Moves singles], without losing the melodic and harmonic interest" and that a "really catchy intro is icing on the cake as this record builds to an exciting close with rollicking horns and a turned-on lead vocal." Record World said that "it's infectious, fast-paced rock 'n' roll with a wistful message."

Classic Rock History critic Janey Roberts rated it as Seger's sixth best song, calling it "One of the greatest album-opening rock and roll songs ever released."
