= Transformation (The Speed of Love) =

Studio album by David Sancious and Tone
- Released: 1976
- Recorded: October and November 1975
- Studios: Caribou Ranch, Colorado
- Genres: Jazz fusion, progressive rock
- Length: 40:05
- Labels: Epic Records; PE 33939
- Producers: David Sancious, Bruce Botnick

David Sancious and Tone chronology
| Forest of Feelings (1975) | Transformation (The Speed of Love) (1976) | Dance of the Age of Enlightenment (1977) |

Transformation (The Speed of Love) is an album by keyboard player and guitarist David Sancious and his band Tone. It was recorded at Caribou Ranch in Colorado during October and November 1975, and was released by Epic Records in 1976. On the album, Sancious is joined by bassist Gerald Carboy and drummer Ernest Carter. Vocalist Gayle Moran also appears on one track.

== Reception ==
Professional ratings
Review scores
| Source | Rating |
|---|---|
| AllMusic | 5/5 stars |

The editors of AllMusic awarded the album a full five stars, and reviewer Thom Jurek wrote: "As an album, Transformation (The Speed of Love) is awe-inspiring, a work of progged-out jazz-rock that's as iconic as Birds of Fire, Blow by Blow, or Hymn of the Seventh Galaxy, yet stands alone for its artful ambition and emotional commitment."

Jon Davis, writing for Exposé Online, stated that the album "compares favorably with the classics of its time," although "Sancious plies his own path, with elements of Mahavishnu, but with some of the Eastern esoterica replaced by earthy American blues." He praised the rhythm section, stating that it "handles the varied moods and tempos very well, generating plenty of energy when the arrangement calls for it."

In a review for The Progressive Aspect, Bob Mulvey commented: "it is that spontaneous live feel that makes the music sound so fresh and invigorating – and the rhythm section are truly in empathy and act as the perfect foil for the bombast of David Sancious keyboards and guitar."

Louder Sound's Malcolm Dome wrote that the four extended tracks "[allow] the musicians... ample space to supplement basic ideas with their considerable imagination," and concluded: "At a time when jazz rock had some amazing protagonists, Sancious showed here why he was among the genre’s elite."

Paul Rigby, writing for The Audiophile Man, stated: "Sometimes experimental, often enlightening but always new and fresh, this is such a wide ranging album but, remarkably, it never loses its focus which is a testament to Sancious' ability to multi-task and to keep all of the tonal plates moving at the same time."

== Track listing ==
All compositions by David Sancious.

1. "Piktor's Metamorphosis" – 6:33
2. "Sky Church Hymn #9" – 8:49
3. "The Play and Display of the Heart" – 6:27
4. "Transformation (The Speed of Love)" – 18:07

== Personnel ==
- David Sancious – acoustic and electric piano, organ, synthesizer, clavinet, electric and acoustic guitars, bells, vocals
- Gerald Carboy – bass guitar, wind chimes
- Ernest Carter – drums, percussion, vocals
- Gayle Moran – vocals (track 4)
