= Tone (jazz-fusion band) =

Tone (also known as David Sancious and Tone) was a jazz-fusion band founded in 1974 by former E Street Band keyboardist David Sancious and drummer Ernest "Boom" Carter. They made half a dozen albums between 1974 and 1980, some of which were billed as Sancious solo projects.

== History ==
In August 1974 Sancious and Carter left the E Street Band and formed their own band Tone with bassist Gerald Carboy. At various times the band would feature Gail Boggs, Brenda Madison, Patti Scialfa, Gayle Moran (from Return To Forever and The Mahavishnu Orchestra), former Brian Auger, and future Santana vocalist Alex Ligertwood. Bruce Springsteen encouraged Sancious in his solo career and made sure music executives heard his demos, leading to a contract with Epic Records.

Tone's 1975 debut album Forest of Feelings was produced by Billy Cobham. Sancious' work with Tone was a radical departure from the music he played with Springsteen; Tone explored progressive rock, gospel chorus (Fade Away, Sound of Love), and instrumental jazz fusion and had more in common with Return to Forever than Sancious' former boss.

Another album, Transformation (The Speed of Love), followed in 1976, and a third album, Dance of the Age of Enlightenment, was recorded. However a dispute between Epic and Sancious' new label, Arista Records, over ownership rights meant it was shelved. It would not be released until 2004 (when it briefly appeared as a Japanese bootleg CD). One more Tone album, True Stories, came out in 1978 but the band subsequently broke up.

Sancious released two solo albums, Just As I Thought (1979) and The Bridge (1980), and then put his solo career on hold. On Sunday, December 14, 1980, during the ten minutes' silence organized in memory of the recently murdered John Lennon, Sancious performed an extended improvisation based upon Lennon's Across the Universe. Commissioned by New York radio station WNEW-FM, the solo piano performance was broadcast live, with no audience present, from the empty stage of the Capitol Theatre (Passaic).

== Discography ==
=== David Sancious and Tone ===
- Transformation (The Speed of Love) (1976)
- Dance of the Age of Enlightenment (1977)
- True Stories (1978)

=== David Sancious ===
- Forest of Feelings (1975)
- Just as I Thought (1979)
- The Bridge (1981)
