= Eric Meola =

American photographer (born 1946)

Eric Meola (born 1946 in Syracuse, New York) is an American photographer. He graduated from Syracuse University in 1968 and is self-taught in the art of photography. In New York he apprenticed under photographer Pete Turner, who influenced Meola's use of saturated color and graphic design. In 1971, Meola opened a studio and began working for popular magazines such as Life, Esquire, and Time, shooting editorial photos. His work has since appeared in museum collections including the National Portrait Gallery in Washington, DC, and in Munich's Museum of Modern Art. Meola's official website can be found below.

Meola has traveled throughout the world, and is recognized for the brilliant use of color in his photography. One of his most famous photos, Coca (Cola) Kid, was taken in Haiti. This photo appeared in the 1997 issue of Life magazine as one of the "100 Magnificent Moments of the Past 1,000 Years". Meola is also known for his photos of Bruce Springsteen, including the cover of Springsteen's album Born to Run. Several of Meola's Springsteen photographs appear in the thirtieth anniversary box-set edition of Darkness on the Edge of Town. Meola's clients include American Express, Jeep, AT&T, Porsche and BMW.

Meola received a Clio Award for his Timberland campaign and won "Photographer of the Year" from the American Society of Media Photographers. He has published several books; Last Places on Earth, published in 2004, and Born to Run: The Unseen Photos, published in 2006. In October 2008, a new, 272-page book entitled India: in Word and Image from Welcome Books compiles his color photography of India. Reviewer Pete Turner says, "Eric…has brought back a vision of color unmatched anywhere on earth."

Meola was among the 43 noted photographers invited to donate a print to "FOCUS: an auction of the finest photography to benefit City Harvest...." The fund-raiser on September 18, 2008 supported City Harvest, a food collection bank in New York City.
