= Live 1976–1977 =

Live album by Stanley Clarke

Live 1976-1977

Live album by Stanley Clarke
- Released: September 10, 1991
- Recorded: June 1976 – September 1977
- Genre: Jazz fusion
- Length: 64:25
- Label: Epic
- Producer: Stanley Clarke

Professional ratings
Review scores
Source	Rating
Allmusic	4/5 stars

Live 1976–1977 is the sixth album of the bassist Stanley Clarke. This is his first live album.

== Track listing ==
All tracks composed and arranged by Stanley Clarke

1. "School Days" — 7:01
2. "Lopsy Lu" — 7:25
3. "Quiet Afternoon" — 6:51
4. "Silly Putty" — 5:37
5. "Dayride" — 7:04
6. "Bass Folk Song No. 3" — 13:41
7. "The Magician" — 5:55
8. "Desert Song" — 7:29
9. "Vulcan Princess" — 3:22
- Tracks 1–4 recorded at the Roxy Theatre, Los Angeles, California, September 1977
- Track 5 recorded at Hammersmith Odeon, London, June 1977
- Tracks 6, 7, 9 recorded at Arlington Theater, Santa Barbara, California, December 1976
- Track 8 recorded at Electric Lady Studios, New York City, June 1976

== Personnel ==
- Stanley Clarke - electric bass guitar (1–5, 7, 9), acoustic bass (6, 8), piccolo bass (3)
- Gerry Brown — drums (1–5, 7, 9)
- Ray Gomez — electric guitar (1–5, 7, 9)
- Al Harrison — trumpet (1–5, 7, 9), flügelhorn (3), piccolo trumpet (7), slide whistle (7)
- Munyungo Jackson — percussion (8)
- Bob Malach — tenor saxophone (1–5), flute (3)
- John McLaughlin — acoustic guitar (8)
- Peter Robinson — Fender Rhodes electric piano, B-3 organ, ARP String Ensemble (1–5); Mini-Moog bass (1, 3, 4)
- David Sancious — piano (6); electric piano, B-3 organ, Mini-Moog synthesizer, Poly-Moog synthesizer, Fender Rhodes (7, 9)
- James Tinsley — trumpet (1–5, 7, 9), flügelhorn (3), piccolo trumpet (7), alarm clock (7)
- Alfie Williams — soprano (1, 3–5), alto (2) and baritone (4) saxophones, flute (3)

=== Production ===
- David Coleman — art direction
- Henry Diltz — photography
- Bernie Grundman — mastering
- Dan Humann — engineer, mixing
- Gary Ladinsky — engineer
- Steve Sykes — mixing
- Bruce Talamon — photography
- Ed Thacker — engineer
