= Shabtai Konorti =

Israeli actor (1943–2002)

- שבתאי קונורטי
- Born: 13 December 1943; Sofia, Bulgaria
- Died: 27 May 2002 (aged 58); Tel Aviv, Israel
- Occupation: Actor
- Years active: 1966–2001
- Spouse: Suki Lahav (divorced)
- Children: 1
- Relatives: Benny Desha (half-brother)

Shabtai Konorti (Hebrew: שבתאי קונורטי; 13 December 1943 – 27 May 2002) was an Israeli actor.

== Biography ==
Born in Sofia, Bulgaria, Konorti moved to Israel with his family at the age of six. He studied at the Municipal High School in Tel Aviv before serving in the IDF. He then went on to study acting at the Nissan Nativ Acting Studio. Konorti took an interest in stage acting and he was one of the people involved in the creation of the Jerusalem Khan Theatre. He also worked at the Ohel Theatre and the Habima Theatre where he starred in stage adaptations of Man Equals Man, The Government Inspector and more.

On screen, Konorti appeared several times on the satirical television program Zehu Ze!. He made several film appearances as well, including a short cameo appearance as a mechanic in the 1993 film Schindler's List directed by Steven Spielberg.

=== Personal life ===
Konorti was briefly married to the singer Suki Lahav during the 1970s and he also has one daughter from another relationship. His half-brother is the painter Benny Desha.

== Death ==
In August 2001, Konorti was involved in a severe car accident which left him mortally injured and placed in a coma. He succumbed to his injuries on May 27 the following year at the age of 58 and was interred at Yarkon Cemetery.

== Filmography ==
Year	Title	Role	Notes
1976	Joker	Oved	
1990	Hameyu'ad	Uzia	
1993	Schindler's List	Garage Mechanic	
1994	Hellbound	Farouk	
1997	Ha-Dybbuk B'sde Hatapuchim Hakdoshim	Tish	
