= Ernest Carter (drummer) =

American drummer (born 1952)

- Also known as: Boom Carter
- Born: Ernest Carter; September 7, 1952 (age 73); Asbury Park, New Jersey, U.S.
- Origin: Asbury Park, New Jersey
- Genres: Rock, jazz fusion
- Occupation: Musician
- Instruments: Drums, guitar, keyboards
- Formerly of: E Street Band, Southside Johnny and the Asbury Jukes

Ernest Carter (born September 7, 1952) is an American drummer. He has toured and recorded with, among others, Bruce Springsteen, David Sancious, Southside Johnny & The Asbury Jukes and Paul Butterfield. During his time with Springsteen, he played the drums on the song "Born to Run".

Carter was able to play all forms of rock, rhythm and blues, soul, and jazz. He was formally trained and blends a variety of styles into his drumming. His successor as the E Street Band's drummer, Max Weinberg, said that Carter devised a jazz fusion part for "Born to Run" that he could never reproduce in concert, and that he eventually stopped trying. Although best known as a drummer, Carter is also a guitarist, keyboardist, and vocalist. In 2001, he released a solo album, Temple of Boom, on which he sings and plays all the instruments.

== Early life ==
Carter was born and raised in Asbury Park, New Jersey. As a teenager he excelled in track and field as well as learning to become an accomplished drummer. He gained the nickname "Boom" when police were summoned to his basement after receiving a report of gunshots being fired. When they arrived on the scene, they found the young Carter practicing his drumming. He was a childhood friend of David Sancious. In the early 1970s, the two moved to Richmond, Virginia, where they worked as session musicians at Alpha Studios. They also performed in a band called Cinnamon and recorded some demos with Garry Tallent. Producer/songwriter Wes Farrell owned the rights to these demos and in 1976 he released them as David Sancious. After Sancious and Tallent were recruited by Bruce Springsteen to help record his debut Greetings From Asbury Park, N.J., Carter moved to Atlanta, and then toured with Little Royal & The Swing Masters, a James Brown-influenced band.

== Career ==
In February 1974 when Vini Lopez left the E Street Band, David Sancious helped recruit Carter as his replacement. He auditioned for the job in a house belonging to the parents of Garry Tallent and then made his debut with the band on February 23 during a concert at the Satellite Lounge in Cookstown, New Jersey. He accompanied Springsteen during an early part of the Born to Run tour, and in August 1974 he laid down the drum track on the song "Born to Run" at the 914 Sound Studios, his only appearance on a Springsteen album. He made his final appearance with the band on August 14 at the Carlton Theater in Red Bank, New Jersey.

In August 1974, David Sancious and Carter left the E Street Band and, together with Gerald Carboy (bass), formed their own jazz fusion band called Tone. At various times the band would also feature Patti Scialfa, Gayle Moran and Alex Ligertwood. They signed a recording contract with Epic Records and their 1975 debut album Forest Of Feelings was produced by Billy Cobham. Another album, Transformation (The Speed of Love), followed in 1976, and a third album, Dance Of The Age Of Enlightenment, was also recorded. However a dispute between Epic and new label, Arista Records, over ownership rights meant it would not be released until 2004. One more Tone album, True Stories, came out in 1978 but the band subsequently broke up.

During the late 1970s, Carter also played with several bands on the Jersey Shore, including Southside Johnny & The Asbury Jukes. He later played with the Lord Gunner Group, a power rock band led by Lance Larson (lead vocals, guitar) and Ricky DeSarno (lead guitarist). He was the first of three notable drummers to play with the band. He was succeeded by Vini Lopez who was in turn succeeded by Tico Torres. In 1978 Carter toured with the Paul Butterfield Blues Band and played with them on the German TV show Rockpalast. During the 1980s he performed and recorded with a Jersey Shore blues band, Billy Hector & The Fairlanes. In the early 1980s he performed with the Woodstock, N.Y. rock band, Brian Greene and Direct Drive. On August 14, 1987 Bruce Springsteen joined The Fairlanes as a guest during a performance at The Stone Pony in Asbury Park, New Jersey. The set included a version of "Savin’ Up", a Springsteen original recorded by Clarence Clemons. Carter later relocated to the San Francisco Bay Area where he worked with Harvey Mandel, Pete Sears, John Lee Hooker, Danny Click, J.C. Flyer, Clarence Clemons and even in early 2000's Chuck Prophet . He has also been the drummer in the house band at the BAM music award show, the Bammies .

== Discography ==
- Ernest Carter
  - Temple of Boom (2001)
- Bruce Springsteen
  - Born to Run (1975)
  - Greatest Hits (1995)
  - The Essential Bruce Springsteen (2003)
- David Sancious & Tone
  - Forest Of Feelings (1975)
  - Transformation (The Speed of Love) (1976)
  - True Stories (1978)
  - Dance Of The Age Of Enlightenment (2004)
- David Sancious
  - David Sancious (1977) (unauthorized)
  - Just As I Thought (1979)
  - The Bridge (1980)
- Southside Johnny & The Asbury Jukes
  - This Time It's For Real (1977)
  - Trash It Up (1983)
- Billy Hector & The Fairlanes
  - Hit The Road (1986)
  - All The Way Live (1987)
- Selected others
  - Various artists: The Sounds Of Asbury Park (1980)
  - Billy Squier: The Tale of the Tape (1980)
  - Little Bob Story: Too Young To Love Me (1984)
  - Jersey Artists for Mankind: We've Got The Love / Save Love, Save Life (1986)
  - Steve Forbert: Streets of This Town (1988)
  - Pete Sears: Long Haul (2001)
  - J.C. Flyer: Movin' On' (2002)
  - Howard Tate: Live (2006)
