= Born to Run (autobiography) =

2016 autobiography of Bruce Springsteen

- Author: Bruce Springsteen
- Language: English
- Genre: Autobiography, memoir
- Published: Simon & Schuster
- Publication date: September 27, 2016 (book), December 6, 2016 (audiobook)
- Publication place: United States
- Pages: 528
- ISBN: 978-1501141515

Born to Run is an autobiography of American songwriter-musician Bruce Springsteen that was released on September 27, 2016 (the audiobook, narrated by Springsteen, was released on December 6, 2016). The title is named after Springsteen's iconic 1975 album and song Born to Run. The book is a companion piece to Chapter and Verse, a career-spanning album featuring songs from all stages of Springsteen's career that was released four days before the book. On the date of the book's release, Springsteen embarked on a nine-date book tour in the United States.

== Background ==
The book's release was officially announced on August 25, 2016.

== Book tour ==
Springsteen embarked on a nine-date book tour which started on September 27, 2016, and concluded on October 10, 2016. The book tour then made its way to the United Kingdom and Germany in late October for two appearances. On October 27, Springsteen hosted another book-signing event in Toronto, Ontario, before interrupting the tour to take part in the annual Stand Up for Heroes concert, to appear in support of Hillary Clinton's presidential campaign, and to receive the Presidential Medal of Freedom. The tour resumed with a five-date North American leg, which was announced on November 21, 2016. This tour began in Chicago on November 28, 2016, and concluded in Kennesaw, Georgia, on December 2.

All events required fans to purchase a pre-signed copy of Springsteen's book. The free tickets for the bookstore appearances, much like his shows, sold out in minutes. Two of the appearances, October 5 in San Francisco and October 7 in New York City, featured interviews only with Springsteen and were conducted by Dan Stone and David Remnick. Springsteen also made appearances on CBS Sunday Morning on September 18, 2016, and on The Late Show with Stephen Colbert on September 23, 2016 (Springsteen's 67th birthday), to promote the book.

Date	City	Country	Venue
North America
September 27, 2016	Freehold	United States	Barnes & Noble
September 28, 2016	New York	United States	Barnes & Noble Union Square
September 29, 2016	Philadelphia	United States	Free Library of Philadelphia
October 1, 2016	Seattle	United States	Elliott Bay Book Company
October 3, 2016	Los Angeles	United States	Barnes & Noble at The Grove
October 4, 2016	Portland	United States	Powell's City of Books
October 5, 2016	San Francisco	United States	City Arts & Lectures
October 7, 2016	New York	United States	The New Yorker Festival
October 10, 2016	Cambridge	United States	The Harvard Coop
Europe
October 17, 2016	London	United Kingdom	Waterstones Piccadilly
October 20, 2016	Frankfurt	Germany	Frankfurt Book Fair
North America
October 27, 2016	Toronto	Canada	Indigo Books and Music
November 28, 2016	Chicago	United States	Books-A-Million
November 29, 2016	Cincinnati	United States	Joseph-Beth Booksellers
November 30, 2016	Denver	United States	Tattered Cover
December 1, 2016	Austin	United States	Book People
December 2, 2016	Kennesaw	United States	2nd & Charles

== Springsteen on Broadway ==
Springsteen performed an eight-week run in New York City from October–November 2017 titled Springsteen on Broadway where he performed his music, read from Born to Run, and performed other spoken reminiscences written for the show. The run was extended through December 15, 2018.

== Awards ==
In November 2017, Springsteen was nominated for the Grammy Award for Best Spoken Word Album. In 2018, Born to Run won Best Autobiography/Memoir at the 2018 Audie Awards.
