= David Sancious =

American musician (born 1953)

- Born: November 30, 1953 (age 72); Asbury Park, New Jersey, United States
- Genres: Alternative rock, jazz, jazz fusion, classical, blues rock, funk
- Occupation: Instrumentalist
- Instruments: Keyboards, guitar, bass guitar
- Formerly of: E Street Band
- Website: davidsancious.com

David Sancious (born November 30, 1953) is an American musician. He was an early member of Bruce Springsteen's backing group, the E Street Band, and contributed to the first three Springsteen albums, and again on Human Touch (1992), Tracks (1998), and Western Stars (2019). Sancious is a multi-instrumentalist but is best known as a keyboard player and guitarist. He left the E Street Band in 1974 to form his own band, Tone, and released several albums. He subsequently became a popular session and touring musician, most notably for Stanley Clarke, Narada Michael Walden, Zucchero Fornaciari, Eric Clapton, Peter Gabriel, Jack Bruce, and Sting among many others. In 2014, Sancious was inducted into the Rock and Roll Hall of Fame as a member of the E Street Band.

== Work with Bruce Springsteen ==
Sancious began to learn classical piano at seven and by eleven he had taught himself guitar. He was only in his teens when he first became involved in the Asbury Park music scene. In the late 1960s and early 1970s he played in various bands that included Springsteen and future members of The E Street Band, as well as Southside Johnny and Bill Chinnock. These bands included Glory Road, Dr. Zoom & The Sonic Boom, The Bruce Springsteen Band and The Sundance Blues Band.

From 1970 until the spring of 1973, Sancious divided his time between his native New Jersey and Richmond, Virginia, where he worked at Alpha Studios as a studio musician doing jingles and sessions. While working in Virginia, he met fellow New Jerseyan Ernest Carter. During those years, Springsteen played numerous gigs in and around Richmond. In June 1972, Sancious played keyboards on Springsteen's debut album, Greetings from Asbury Park, N.J. In July 1972, Sancious recorded some demos with Carter and E Street Band bassist Garry Tallent (who also divided his time between New Jersey and Virginia.) Producer/songwriter Wes Farrell owned the rights to these demos and in 1976 he released them under the title David Sancious, without Sancious's permission.

The E Street Band was named after the street where Sancious's mother lived. In the band's early days, Springsteen and his bandmates used her garage at 1107 E Street in Belmar, New Jersey as a rehearsal space. Springsteen began touring with the band in October 1972, but Sancious did not join the band full-time until June 1973.

From June 1973, Sancious began to tour regularly with the E Street Band. He added an extra dimension to the band's sound. Equally influenced by Mozart or Thelonious Monk, he would frequently use classical music or jazz during intros or instrumental breaks. Springsteen's second album, The Wild, The Innocent, & The E Street Shuffle, was a showcase for Sancious' talents. His most notable contributions include an organ solo on "Kitty's Back" and an evocative piano intro on "New York City Serenade". He is also credited with the string arrangement on the latter song, and even played soprano saxophone on "The E Street Shuffle" and was an important contributor to "Incident on 57th Street".

In February 1974, drummer Vini Lopez left the E Street Band and Sancious recommended his friend, Ernest Carter, as a replacement. Later in the year Sancious and Carter helped record the title track of Springsteen's third album, Born to Run before leaving the band. Ironically, the band formally adopted the "E Street Band" name only after the band member whose family lived on that street (i.e., Sancious) left the group.

Sancious was inducted into the Rock and Roll Hall of Fame as a member of the E Street Band on April 10, 2014. Sancious also joined Springsteen and the current lineup (along with Vini Lopez) for a performance of three songs. He also played two songs with Peter Gabriel, who was inducted on the same night.

In June 2023, Sancious said that he is set to appear on a follow-up to Springsteen's 2022 album Only the Strong Survive and that Bruce has completed 18 songs for the album. Sancious said he expects to tour with Springsteen to support the album in 2024.

== David Sancious and Tone ==
In August 1974 Sancious and Carter left the E Street Band and formed their own band Tone with bassist Gerald Carboy. At various times the band would feature Gail Boggs, Brenda Madison, Patti Scialfa, Gayle Moran (from Return To Forever and The Mahavishnu Orchestra), former Brian Auger, and future Santana vocalist Alex Ligertwood. Springsteen encouraged Sancious in his solo career and made sure music executives heard his demos, leading to a contract with Epic Records.

Tone's 1975 debut album Forest of Feelings was produced by Billy Cobham. Sancious' work with Tone was a radical departure from the music he played with Springsteen; Tone explored progressive rock, gospel chorus (Fade Away, Sound of Love), and instrumental jazz fusion and had more in common with Return to Forever than Sancious' former boss.

Another album, Transformation (The Speed of Love), followed in 1976, and a third album, Dance of the Age of Enlightenment, was recorded. However a dispute between Epic and Sancious' new label, Arista Records, over ownership rights meant it was shelved. It would not be released until 2004 (when it briefly appeared as a Japanese bootleg CD). One more Tone album, True Stories, came out in 1978 but the band subsequently broke up.

Sancious released two solo albums, Just As I Thought (1979) and The Bridge (1980), and then put his solo career on hold. On Sunday, December 14, 1980, during the ten minutes' silence organized in memory of the recently murdered John Lennon, Sancious performed an extended improvisation based upon Lennon's Across the Universe. Commissioned by New York radio station WNEW-FM, the solo piano performance was broadcast live, with no audience present, from the empty stage of the Capitol Theatre (Passaic) .

== Session and touring musician ==
In the 1970s, Sancious toured and recorded with Stanley Clarke, playing guitar and keyboards in a band that included John McLaughlin and Billy Cobham.

In 1977 Sancious guested on the debut album by Narada Michael Walden. This was the first of several collaborations with the producer/songwriter. In the 1980s Walden regularly used a group of session musicians that included Sancious, Randy Jackson, and Corrado Rustici. These musicians recorded sessions with, among others, Aretha Franklin, Patti Austin, and E Streeter Clarence Clemons, all produced by Walden. Rustici also established himself as a producer, most notably with fellow Italian, Zucchero Fornaciari. Sancious, Walden, and Jackson played on Zucchero's Rispetto, produced by Rustici. This was the first of several albums Sancious would record with Zucchero.

During the early 1980s, he linked up again with Billy Cobham as a member of Jack Bruce & Friends and played with the band on The Old Grey Whistle Test and Rockpalast. He was then reunited with Alex Ligertwood when both were members of Santana.

In 1981, Sancious rehearsed with the Rolling Stones at Long View Farm Studios in Massachusetts to become their keyboard player for the 1981 American tour. He only stayed a couple days; "...He just didn't fit in," said Bill Wyman.

In 1982, Sancious recorded and toured with Jon Anderson of Yes. Jon's Animation (1982) album features David extensively. On Jon's Spring and Summer 1982 US Animation tour, David played piano and synthesizer on several Yes tunes as well as Jon Anderson tunes. Anderson included one of David's solo works in the set. "The Play and Display of the Heart" (track 3 on David Sancious & Tone's Transformation (The Speed of Love) album) was a regular showstopper. You can hear an entire Animation concert at Wolfgang's Vault

By 1986, Sancious was a member of Peter Gabriel's touring band and he played with the singer during the Amnesty International Human Rights Now! Tour. This led to a mini-reunion with Springsteen and the E Street Band, with Sancious sitting in on several occasions throughout the tour. He also recorded some new sessions with Springsteen which were later released on Human Touch and Tracks.

He also recorded and performed with two of that tour's other headliners, Sting and Youssou N'Dour. He played keyboards on Sting's The Soul Cages and Ten Summoner's Tales albums and toured with Sting in support of both.

Other session and touring work Sancious has done includes Living Colour, Seal, Bryan Ferry, Julia Fordham, Robbie Dupree, Natalie Merchant, Eric Clapton, Jon Anderson of Yes, and Hall & Oates.

Sancious released Nine Piano Improvisations (2000) and Cinema (2005).

In 2005 Sancious would be interviewed for, and featured in, the Wings for Wheels documentary included on the Born to Run 30th Anniversary Edition re-release of the Springsteen song and album. Sancious teamed up with guitarist and singer/songwriter Francis Dunnery in 2006 to play keyboards and make several live appearances for Dunnery's The Gulley Flats Boys. In 2007, Sancious released LIVE in the now, a selection of recordings of live performances by Sancious featuring drummer Joe Bonadio on several tracks.

In 2007 and 2008 Sancious toured with Zucchero Fornaciari during the "Fly" and "All the Best" world tours. In 2009, Sancious toured Australia, New Zealand, and Japan on keyboards with Jeff Beck, who was accompanied by Vinnie Colaiuta on drums and Tal Wilkenfeld on bass. In 2010, Sancious toured the UK with Francis Dunnery "Fearless Tour", Tony Beard on drums, Jamie Bishop on bass & Dorie Jackson vocals.

In 2016, Sancious played with Peter Gabriel and Sting on a co-headlined tour.

== Discography ==
=== With Bruce Springsteen ===
- Greetings from Asbury Park, N.J. (1973)
- The Wild, The Innocent & The E Street Shuffle (1973)
- Born to Run (1975)
- Human Touch (1992)
- Greatest Hits (1995)
- Tracks (1998)
- 18 Tracks (1998)
- The Essential Bruce Springsteen (2003)
- Western Stars (2019)

=== David Sancious and Tone ===
- Transformation (The Speed of Love) (1976)
- Dance of the Age of Enlightenment (1977)
- True Stories (1978)

=== David Sancious ===
- Forest of Feelings (1975)
- David Sancious (1976)
- David Sancious – The Chelsea Demos (1977) (unauthorized bootleg)
- Just as I Thought (1979)
- The Bridge (1982, Elektra/Musician)
- Nine Piano Improvisations (2000)
- Cinema (2005)
- LIVE in the now (2007)
- Eyes Wide Open (2020)

=== With Jack Bruce and Friends ===
- I've Always Wanted to Do This (1980)

=== With Santana ===
- Beyond Appearances (1985) – rhythm guitar, keyboards, synthesizer, guitar. Co-writer of song "Brotherhood".

=== David Sancious / Zucchero ===
- Snackbar Budapest (soundtrack) (1988)

=== With Eric Clapton ===
- 2001 Reptile tour
- Clapton Live at Budokan (2001)
- One More Car, One More Rider (2002)

=== With Stanley Clarke ===
- Journey to Love (1975)
- School Days (1976)
- Live 1976–1977 (1976)
- Hideaway (1988)
- The Bass-ic Collection (1997)
- Guitar & Bass (2004)
- Trios (2004)

=== With France Gall ===
- Live at the Olympia in Paris (1996)
- Concert Privé M6 (1997)

=== With Zucchero Fornaciari ===
- Rispetto (1986)
- Blue's (1987)
- Oro Incenso & Birra (1989)
- Zucchero (1990)
- Live at the Kremlin (1991)
- Miserere (1992)
- Diamante (1994)
- Spirto DiVino (1995)
- The Best of Zucchero (1996)
- Shake (2001)
- Zucchero & Co (2004)

=== With Peter Gabriel ===
- Passion (1989)
- Us (1992)
- Up (2002)
- Long Walk Home (2002)
- Hit (2003)

=== With Sting ===
- The Soul Cages (1991)
- Ten Summoner's Tales (1993)
- Demolition Man live EP (1993)

=== With Jon Anderson ===
- Animation (1982)

=== With Francis Dunnery ===
- The Gulley Flats Boys (2006)

=== With Robbie Dupree ===
- Robbie Dupree with David Sancious (2003)
