= Billy Hector =

American musician (born 1956)

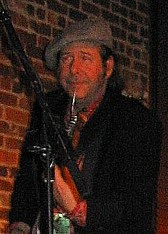
- Hector performing at Big Danny's wake at Red Fusion in Asbury Park, New Jersey, 2007

Background information
- Born: 1956 (age 68–69); Orange, New Jersey, U.S.
- Genres: Blues, rock, folk rock
- Occupation(s): Musician, singer-songwriter
- Instrument(s): Vocals, guitar
- Labels: Ghetto Surf Music
- Website: billyhector.com

Billy Hector (born 1956) is an American blues guitarist and singer-songwriter from Orange, New Jersey.

== History ==
Hector was initially lured into the music world after seeing the Beatles on the Ed Sullivan Show. He says this changed his world. He soon found himself drawn to the blues. He started taking guitar lessons at age 9, and later studied jazz guitar and music history at William Paterson University.

Hector started playing regularly in a blues band in 1985. He has been producing albums for over 20 years while performing primarily in small clubs.

Hector's guitar style is a combination of Jersey Shore blues and rock n roll.

As of 2013, his band consisted of Hector on guitar and vocals, Timmy Tindall on bass, and Dan Hickey on drums.

Hector received the Best Guitarist Award from music critic Bob Makin of The Aquarian Weekly's East Coast Rocker section twice. He is also the recipient of three Asbury Park Music Awards: "Best Guitarist", "Best Blues Band" and the "Living Legend." Hector and his band were billed alongside Bonnie Raitt at The Rock and Roll Hall of Fame's "Tribute to Muddy Waters".

Hector has played with B. B. King, Bo Diddley, Johnny Winter, Buddy Guy, Dr. John, and The Fabulous Thunderbirds, but is most at home in small clubs. He was the touring guitarist for Hubert Sumlin and Joe Louis Walker.

He appeared in the movie Hellhound on My Trail backing Sonny Landreth, and in One Way Out.

== Discography ==
- 1988 (45 rpm single) "Your Time Is At Hand" / "If You Love Me Like You Say (You Wouldn't Treat Me Like You Do)"
- 1989 All The Way Live
- 1993 Wild, Wild Beast
- 1993 And The Crowd Went Wild!!!
- 1994 Cold Wind
- 1997 Hard to Please
- 2000 What Can a Poor Boy Do?
- 2001 Duct Tape Life
- 2002 Busy Man
- 2002 Undertow
- 2003 Stonehenge
- 2003 Out of Order
- 2005 Alive and Kickin'
- 2007 Hard Rockin' Blues
- 2009 Traveler
- 2013 Choice Cuts
- 2014 Fire Within
- 2015 Old School Thang
- 2019 Someday Baby
- 2022 Rock Night in Jersey
