= The Album Collection Vol. 1 1973–1984 =

Box set by Bruce Springsteen
- Released: November 17, 2014
- Recorded: 1973–1984
- Genres: Rock and roll; heartland rock; folk rock; R&B
- Length: 5:38:11
- Labels: Columbia; Legacy
- Producers: Mike Appel, Jim Cretecos, Bruce Springsteen, Jon Landau, Steven Van Zandt, Chuck Plotkin

Bruce Springsteen chronology
| American Beauty (2014) | The Album Collection Vol. 1 1973–1984 (2014) | The Ties That Bind: The River Collection (2015) |

Bruce Springsteen and the E Street Band chronology
| American Beauty (2014) | The Album Collection Vol. 1 1973–1984 (2014) | The Ties That Bind: The River Collection (2015) |

The Album Collection Vol. 1 1973–1984 is a box set collection by Bruce Springsteen released on November 17, 2014. The 8 disc box set contains remastered versions of Springsteen's first seven studio albums and for the first time ever on CD, remasters of Greetings from Asbury Park, N.J., The Wild, the Innocent & the E Street Shuffle, The River, Nebraska and Born in the U.S.A. The box set features each album with recreations of their original packaging and also contain a 60-page book. All seven albums have also made their remastered debut on vinyl, and are available digitally at the iTunes Store.

The albums were remastered by engineers Bob Ludwig and Toby Scott using brand new transfers from the original analogue masters using the Plangent Process playback system.

== Albums ==
Greetings from Asbury Park, N.J.
| No. | Title | Length |
|---|---|---|
| 1. | "Blinded by the Light" | 5:02 |
| 2. | "Growin' Up" | 3:05 |
| 3. | "Mary Queen of Arkansas" | 5:21 |
| 4. | "Does This Bus Stop at 82nd Street?" | 2:05 |
| 5. | "Lost in the Flood" | 5:17 |
| 6. | "The Angel" | 3:24 |
| 7. | "For You" | 4:40 |
| 8. | "Spirit in the Night" | 5:00 |
| 9. | "It's Hard to Be a Saint in the City" | 3:13 |

The Wild, the Innocent & the E Street Shuffle
| No. | Title | Length |
|---|---|---|
| 1. | "The E Street Shuffle" | 4:31 |
| 2. | "4th of July, Asbury Park (Sandy)" | 5:36 |
| 3. | "Kitty's Back" | 7:09 |
| 4. | "Wild Billy's Circus Story" | 4:43 |
| 5. | "Incident on 57th Street" | 7:45 |
| 6. | "Rosalita (Come Out Tonight)" | 7:04 |
| 7. | "New York City Serenade" | 9:55 |

Born to Run
| No. | Title | Length |
|---|---|---|
| 1. | "Thunder Road" | 4:49 |
| 2. | "Tenth Avenue Freeze-Out" | 3:11 |
| 3. | "Night" | 3:00 |
| 4. | "Backstreets" | 6:30 |
| 5. | "Born to Run" | 4:31 |
| 6. | "She's the One" | 4:30 |
| 7. | "Meeting Across the River" | 3:18 |
| 8. | "Jungleland" | 9:34 |

Darkness on the Edge of Town
| No. | Title | Length |
|---|---|---|
| 1. | "Badlands" | 4:01 |
| 2. | "Adam Raised a Cain" | 4:32 |
| 3. | "Something in the Night" | 5:11 |
| 4. | "Candy's Room" | 2:51 |
| 5. | "Racing in the Street" | 6:52 |
| 6. | "The Promised Land" | 4:28 |
| 7. | "Factory" | 2:17 |
| 8. | "Streets of Fire" | 4:09 |
| 9. | "Prove It All Night" | 3:56 |
| 10. | "Darkness on the Edge of Town" | 4:30 |

The River
| No. | Title | Length |
|---|---|---|
| 1. | "The Ties That Bind" | 3:34 |
| 2. | "Sherry Darling" | 4:03 |
| 3. | "Jackson Cage" | 3:04 |
| 4. | "Two Hearts" | 2:45 |
| 5. | "Independence Day" | 4:46 |
| 6. | "Hungry Heart" | 3:19 |
| 7. | "Out in the Street" | 4:17 |
| 8. | "Crush on You" | 3:10 |
| 9. | "You Can Look (But You Better Not Touch)" | 2:37 |
| 10. | "I Wanna Marry You" | 3:30 |
| 11. | "The River" | 4:59 |
| 12. | "Point Blank" | 6:05 |
| 13. | "Cadillac Ranch" | 3:03 |
| 14. | "I'm a Rocker" | 3:36 |
| 15. | "Fade Away" | 4:41 |
| 16. | "Stolen Car" | 3:54 |
| 17. | "Ramrod" | 4:04 |
| 18. | "The Price You Pay" | 5:27 |
| 19. | "Drive All Night" | 8:33 |
| 20. | "Wreck on the Highway" | 3:54 |

Nebraska
| No. | Title | Length |
|---|---|---|
| 1. | "Nebraska" | 4:27 |
| 2. | "Atlantic City" | 3:54 |
| 3. | "Mansion on the Hill" | 4:03 |
| 4. | "Johnny 99" | 3:39 |
| 5. | "Highway Patrolman" | 5:39 |
| 6. | "State Trooper" | 3:15 |
| 7. | "Used Cars" | 3:05 |
| 8. | "Open All Night" | 2:53 |
| 9. | "My Father's House" | 5:07 |
| 10. | "Reason to Believe" | 4:11 |

Born in the U.S.A.
| No. | Title | Length |
|---|---|---|
| 1. | "Born in the U.S.A." | 4:39 |
| 2. | "Cover Me" | 3:27 |
| 3. | "Darlington County" | 4:48 |
| 4. | "Working on the Highway" | 3:11 |
| 5. | "Downbound Train" | 3:35 |
| 6. | "I'm on Fire" | 2:37 |
| 7. | "No Surrender" | 4:00 |
| 8. | "Bobby Jean" | 3:46 |
| 9. | "I'm Goin' Down" | 3:29 |
| 10. | "Glory Days" | 4:15 |
| 11. | "Dancing in the Dark" | 4:00 |
| 12. | "My Hometown" | 4:34 |
