= The River Tour =

1980–81 concert tour by Bruce Springsteen

- Tour by Bruce Springsteen and the E Street Band
- Associated album: The River
- Start date: October 3, 1980
- End date: September 14, 1981
- Legs: 4
- No. of shows: 140

Bruce Springsteen and the E Street Band concert chronology
- Darkness Tour (1978–79); The River Tour (1980–81); Born in the U.S.A. Tour (1984–85)

The River Tour was a concert tour featuring Bruce Springsteen and the E Street Band that took place in 1980 and 1981, beginning concurrently with the release of Springsteen's album The River.

== Itinerary ==
The first leg of the tour took place in arenas in the United States, comprising 46 shows beginning on October 3, 1980, in Crisler Arena in Ann Arbor, Michigan, and lasting through the end of the year. After a three-week holiday break, a second leg continued with 26 shows through early March in Canada and the U.S.

The third leg of the tour, during April through June 1981 (and pushed back three weeks from the original schedule, due to Springsteen's exhaustion from the first two legs), represented Springsteen's first real foray into Western Europe, and his first appearances at all there since his very short venture there following the release of Born to Run in 1975. In total 34 shows were played, including six nights at London's Wembley Arena. Ten countries were visited: West Germany, Switzerland, France, Spain, Belgium, the Netherlands, Denmark, Sweden, Norway, and the United Kingdom.

The final leg was billed as a "homecoming tour", visiting U.S. cities that had been special in Springsteen's career for multiple-night stands, beginning with six nights that opened his native New Jersey's Meadowlands Arena. After 34 shows in just 10 cities, this leg concluded on September 13 and 14 at Cincinnati's Riverfront Coliseum.

== The show ==
For the only time in his career, Springsteen opened some concerts with his signature song, "Born to Run". At the very first Ann Arbor show, he (in)famously was struck dumb and forgot the words to it; the audience's singing them helped him regain his bearings. In that show's encore, local hero Bob Seger appeared to duet with Springsteen on "Thunder Road".

Springsteen's performances on this tour were similar in nature to tours before, but extended in length. Thirty-song sets were often seen and shows ran up to four hours; it was during this tour that Springsteen's reputation for marathon performances really took hold.

The emotional temper of the concerts was assessed differently depending upon the goer, with some having a party and others reporting that after a string of depressing songs they felt like slitting their wrists. Certainly The River had material to illustrate both viewpoints—on it Springsteen had acknowledged that "life had paradoxes, a lot of them, and you've got to live with them"—and the tour followed in kind. A key difference now was that where before Springsteen had relied upon old 1960s R&B and pop numbers for his concerts' uptempo, lighter moments, he now had written them himself: "Out in the Street" "I'm a Rocker," "Ramrod," "Cadillac Ranch," "Crush on You" and "You Can Look (But You Better Not Touch)" would serve this role in this tour and in tours for years to come.

A couple of Springsteen concert traditions began during the tour. Near the end of the frat-rocker "Sherry Darling", Springsteen pulled a young female out of the front rows and danced with her on stage; this practice would become famous when he did it in the subsequent Born in the U.S.A. Tour during "Dancing in the Dark". And when playing his new (and first) Top 10 hit "Hungry Heart", Springsteen let the audience sing the first verse and chorus, a ritual that would be solidified on subsequent tours as well.

Two shows were noted at the time for their confluence with historical events. A November 5, 1980, show at Arizona State University followed the day after Ronald Reagan's electoral college landslide in the United States Presidential election. In a rare move for the time, Springsteen pronounced, "I don't know what you guys think about what happened last night, but I think it's pretty frightening", after which he and the band launched into a particularly fiery rendition of "Badlands". The performance of the song, but not the preceding remark, was included in the Live/1975-85 box set, and the performance was later included in full on a video release of the show in 2015. About a month later, on December 9, Springsteen went ahead with a scheduled concert at The Spectrum in Philadelphia the day after John Lennon was murdered, despite initial objections from sideman Steven Van Zandt. "It's a hard world that asks you to live with a lot of things that are unlivable", Springsteen announced before starting the show, "And it's hard to come out here and play tonight, but there's nothing else to do." He opened with an especially frenzied "Born to Run" and closed with a rendition of the Beatles' version of "Twist and Shout".

The most famous of the shows on the tour is probably the New Year's Eve 1980 concert at Nassau Coliseum on Long Island, New York. With a set list 38 songs strong, it was one of the longest Springsteen shows of all time.

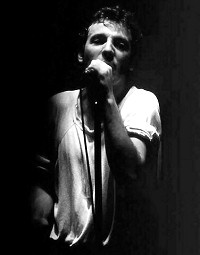
Springsteen in concert on The River Tour. Drammenshallen, Drammen, Norway. 5 May 1981.

The first European show in Hamburg, West Germany, started out stiffly, but in time language and cultural barriers were broken and the European leg of the tour was considered a great success in building a Springsteen following there. It concluded with two epic shows at Birmingham, England's NEC Arena, one of which featured the Who's Pete Townshend joining the encores.

Moreover, his time in these foreign countries exposed Springsteen to the world outside America, including talking to people who considered America a beacon of self-interest and greed, and gave him alternative views of societies and issues. He began to read books on American history, deepening his heretofore admittedly shallow political consciousness.

By the time the final leg of the tour took place back in the U.S., he was doing a benefit show for Vietnam Veterans of America in Los Angeles (which raised $100,000) and often singing a heartfelt acoustic version of Woody Guthrie's "This Land Is Your Land", presaging his much greater political involvement later in the 1980s. His on-stage stories and raps became longer and emotional, and he began asking for quiet before some of his more serious songs. He added the dour death-of-Elvis "Bye Bye Johnny" (later retitled "Johnny Bye Bye") and obscure Jimmy Cliff descent "Trapped" to his repertoire.

The July 1981 Meadowlands shows, while lauded for opening the arena (New Jersey's first), were marred by their proximity to the American Fourth of July and the firecrackers that were set off in the crowd during every show of the stand. Springsteen hated them (and had once been hit in the face with one), and angrily denounced the fans doing it.

This was also the final E Street Band tour performed in the classic all-male lineup before Patti Scialfa joined the band permanently from the Born in the U.S.A. Tour onwards.

== Songs performed ==
Originals

Greetings from Asbury Park, New Jersey

- "For You"
- "Growin' Up"
- "It's Hard to Be a Saint in the City"
- "Spirit in the Night"

The Wild, the Innocent & the E Street Shuffle

- "4th of July, Asbury Park (Sandy)"
- "Incident on 57th Street"
- "Rosalita (Come Out Tonight)"

Born to Run

- "Backstreets"
- "Born to Run"
- "Jungleland"
- "Meeting Across the River"
- "Night"
- "She's the One"
- "Tenth Avenue Freeze-Out"
- "Thunder Road"

Darkness on the Edge of Town

- "Badlands"
- "Candy's Room"
- "Darkness on the Edge of Town"
- "Factory"
- "The Promised Land"
- "Prove It All Night"
- "Racing in the Street"

The River

- "Cadillac Ranch"
- "Crush on You"
- "Drive All Night"
- "Fade Away"
- "Hungry Heart"
- "I Wanna Marry You" (with "Here She Comes" intro)
- "Independence Day"
- "Jackson Cage"
- "I'm a Rocker"
- "Out in the Street"
- "Point Blank"
- "The Price You Pay"
- "Ramrod"
- "The River"
- "Sherry Darling"
- "Stolen Car"
- "The Ties That Bind"
- "Two Hearts"
- "You Can Look (But You Better Not Touch)"
- "Wreck on the Highway"

Others

- "Because the Night"
- "Fire"
- "Held Up Without a Gun"
- "Johnny Bye-Bye"
- "Rendezvous"

Cover songs

- "Auld Lang Syne"
- "Ballad of Easy Rider"
- "Can't Help Falling in Love"
- "Deportee (Plane Wreck at Los Gatos)"
- "Detroit Medley"
- "Double Shot (Of My Baby's Love)"
- "Follow That Dream"
- "Good Rockin' Tonight"
- "Haunted House"
- "High School Confidential"
- "I Don't Want to Go Home"
- "I Fought the Law"
- "In the Midnight Hour"
- "Jersey Girl"
- "Jole Blon"
- "Kansas City"
- "Louie Louie"
- "Merry Christmas, Baby"
- "Mystery Train"
- "No Money Down"
- "On Top of Old Smokey"
- "Out of Limits"
- "Proud Mary"
- "Quarter to Three"
- "Raise Your Hand"
- "Rave On"
- "Rockin' All Over the World"
- "Run Through the Jungle"
- "Santa Claus Is Coming to Town"
- "Sea Cruise"
- "Shake"
- "Summertime Blues"
- "Sweet Little Sixteen"
- "Sweet Soul Music"
- "This Land Is Your Land"
- "This Little Girl"
- "Trapped"
- "Twist and Shout"
- "Waltz Across Texas"
- "War"
- "Who'll Stop the Rain"
- "The Yellow Rose of Texas"
- "You Can't Sit Down"

== Critical and commercial reception ==
By now tickets were very hard to get for many Springsteen concerts. As biographer Dave Marsh wrote, "Springsteen concert tickets sold out of all proportion to his popularity in the record stores or on Top Forty radio. He could sell out 20,000-seat sports arenas faster and more often than artists who sold four or five times as many records ... he was acclaimed as the greatest performer in rock." Thus, ticket scalping was a constant problem, as was fraud in mail-order lottery sales.

Critic Robert Hilburn wrote that the album and "the extensive U.S. tour that immediately followed its release made Springsteen not just a critical but also popular favorite with rock & roll fans across the country. No longer was he seen as merely an East Coast critical phenomenon." Music writer Robert Santelli wrote that, "Eager to please old fans and make disciples of new ones, Springsteen and the band pushed the limits nearly every night, with shows that went on for three—and sometimes four—hours. These marathon performances were exhausting for band and audience alike. The sheer number of songs played, the range of emotions explored, and the between-songs stories told by Springsteen ... took the shows far beyond the usual rock concert. Each night turned into a hard-driving demonstration of how and why Bruce Springsteen and the E Street Band had become the best rock act on the road."

== Broadcasts and recordings ==
As previously mentioned, no River Tour shows were broadcast live, and for nearly three and a half decades after the tour's completion, the sole documentation of the tour came from the Live/1975-85 box set's selections.

Partial video of the November 5, 1980, show in Tempe was released as part of The Ties That Bind: The River Collection, and audio of the missing songs was released through the Bruce Springsteen Archives as a free download on December 24, 2015.

Several shows have since been released as part of the Bruce Springsteen Archives:

- Nassau Coliseum, New York 1980 released on March 25, 2015, and re-mixed and re-released on July 5, 2019
- Wembley Arena, June 5, 1981 released on August 3, 2018
- Nassau Coliseum, New York 12/29/80 released on July 5, 2019
- Brendan Byrne Arena, July 9, 1981 released on May 1, 2020
- Nassau Coliseum, Dec 28, 1980 released on December 3, 2021
- London, June 4, 1981 released on June 3, 2022
- Brendan Byrne Arena, July 6, 1981 released on October 3, 2025

== Personnel ==
- Bruce Springsteen – lead vocals, guitars, harmonica
- Roy Bittan – piano, background vocals
- Clarence Clemons – saxophone, percussion, background vocals
- Danny Federici – organ, glockenspiel, background vocals
- Garry Tallent – bass guitar
- Steven Van Zandt – guitars, background vocals
- Max Weinberg – drums

== Tour dates ==
Date	City	Country	Venue	Attendance	Revenue
North America
October 3, 1980	Ann Arbor	United States	Crisler Arena	—N/a	—N/a
October 4, 1980	Cincinnati	United States	Riverfront Coliseum	16,336 / 17,000	$138,819
October 6, 1980	Richfield	United States	Richfield Coliseum	—N/a	—N/a
October 7, 1980	Richfield	United States	Richfield Coliseum	—N/a	—N/a
October 9, 1980	Detroit	United States	Cobo Hall	—N/a	—N/a
October 10, 1980	Chicago	United States	Uptown Theatre	—N/a	—N/a
October 11, 1980	Chicago	United States	Uptown Theatre	—N/a	—N/a
October 13, 1980	Saint Paul	United States	St. Paul Civic Center	—N/a	—N/a
October 14, 1980	Milwaukee	United States	MECCA Arena	11,714 / 11,714	$98,000
October 17, 1980	St. Louis	United States	Kiel Opera House	6,769 / 6,769	$71,074
October 18, 1980	St. Louis	United States	Kiel Opera House	6,769 / 6,769	$71,074
October 20, 1980	Denver	United States	McNichols Arena	15,932 / 15,932	$162,126
October 24, 1980	Seattle	United States	Seattle Center Coliseum	13,426 / 13,426	$154,550
October 25, 1980	Portland	United States	Memorial Coliseum	9,893 / 12,000	$95,453
October 27, 1980	Oakland	United States	Oakland–Alameda County Coliseum Arena	27,287 / 27,287	$271,630
October 28, 1980	Oakland	United States	Oakland–Alameda County Coliseum Arena	27,287 / 27,287	$271,630
October 30, 1980	Los Angeles	United States	Los Angeles Sports Arena	—N/a	—N/a
October 31, 1980	Los Angeles	United States	Los Angeles Sports Arena	—N/a	—N/a
November 1, 1980	Los Angeles	United States	Los Angeles Sports Arena	—N/a	—N/a
November 3, 1980	Los Angeles	United States	Los Angeles Sports Arena	—N/a	—N/a
November 5, 1980	Tempe	United States	ASU Activity Center	—N/a	—N/a
November 8, 1980	Dallas	United States	Reunion Arena	—N/a	—N/a
November 9, 1980	Austin	United States	Frank Erwin Center		
November 11, 1980	Baton Rouge	United States	LSU Assembly Center	12,926 / 12,926	$106,659
November 14, 1980	Houston	United States	The Summit	25,764 / 25,764	$270,776
November 15, 1980	Houston	United States	The Summit	25,764 / 25,764	$270,776
November 20, 1980	Rosemont	United States	Rosemont Horizon		
November 23, 1980	Landover	United States	Capital Centre	—N/a	—N/a
November 24, 1980	Landover	United States	Capital Centre	—N/a	—N/a
November 27, 1980	New York City	United States	Madison Square Garden	39,860 / 39,860	$465,000
November 28, 1980	New York City	United States	Madison Square Garden	39,860 / 39,860	$465,000
November 30, 1980	Pittsburgh	United States	Civic Arena	34,862 / 34,862	$339,905
December 1, 1980	Pittsburgh	United States	Civic Arena	34,862 / 34,862	$339,905
December 2, 1980	Rochester	United States	Rochester Community War Memorial	9,288 / 9,288	$87,084
December 4, 1980	Buffalo	United States	Memorial Auditorium	17,646 / 17,646	$165,648
December 6, 1980	Philadelphia	United States	The Spectrum	54,819 / 54,819	$614,230
December 8, 1980	Philadelphia	United States	The Spectrum	54,819 / 54,819	$614,230
December 9, 1980	Philadelphia	United States	The Spectrum	54,819 / 54,819	$614,230
December 11, 1980	Providence	United States	Providence Civic Center	13,000 / 13,000	$112,978
December 12, 1980	Hartford	United States	Hartford Civic Center	16,057 / 16,057	$155,002
December 15, 1980	Boston	United States	Boston Garden	31,000 / 31,000	$307,961
December 16, 1980	Boston	United States	Boston Garden	31,000 / 31,000	$307,961
December 18, 1980	New York City	United States	Madison Square Garden		
December 19, 1980	New York City	United States	Madison Square Garden		
December 28, 1980	Uniondale	United States	Nassau Coliseum	50,000 / 50,000	$600,000
December 29, 1980	Uniondale	United States	Nassau Coliseum	50,000 / 50,000	$600,000
December 31, 1980	Uniondale	United States	Nassau Coliseum	50,000 / 50,000	$600,000
North America
January 20, 1981	Toronto	Canada	Maple Leaf Gardens	—N/a	—N/a
January 21, 1981	Toronto	Canada	Maple Leaf Gardens	—N/a	—N/a
January 23, 1981	Montreal	Canada	Montreal Forum	—N/a	—N/a
January 24, 1981	Ottawa	Canada	Ottawa Civic Centre	—N/a	—N/a
January 26, 1981	South Bend	United States	Edmund P. Joyce Center	10,182 / 10,182	$104,929
January 28, 1981	St. Louis	United States	Checkerdome	9,975 / 15,000	$114,713
January 29, 1981	Ames	United States	Hilton Coliseum	14,158 / 14,158	$165,498
February 1, 1981	Saint Paul	United States	St. Paul Civic Center	—N/a	—N/a
February 2, 1981	Madison	United States	Dane County Memorial Coliseum	—N/a	—N/a
February 4, 1981	Carbondale	United States	SIU Arena	—N/a	—N/a
February 5, 1981	Kansas City	United States	Kemper Arena	—N/a	—N/a
February 7, 1981	Champaign	United States	Assembly Hall	—N/a	—N/a
February 12, 1981	Mobile	United States	Municipal Auditorium	7,932 / 10,000	$88,455
February 13, 1981	Starkville	United States	Humphrey Coliseum	—N/a	—N/a
February 15, 1981	Lakeland	United States	Lakeland Civic Center	—N/a	—N/a
February 16, 1981	Lakeland	United States	Lakeland Civic Center	—N/a	—N/a
February 18, 1981	Jacksonville	United States	Jacksonville Memorial Coliseum	7,829 / 10,000	$84,143
February 20, 1981	Pembroke Pines	United States	Hollywood Sportatorium	—N/a	—N/a
February 22, 1981	Columbia	United States	Carolina Coliseum	—N/a	—N/a
February 23, 1981	Atlanta	United States	The Omni	—N/a	—N/a
February 25, 1981	Memphis	United States	Mid-South Coliseum	—N/a	—N/a
February 26, 1981	Nashville	United States	Nashville Municipal Auditorium	9,546 / 9,546	$100,457
February 28, 1981	Greensboro	United States	Greensboro Coliseum	15,288 / 23,029	$170,151
March 2, 1981	Hampton	United States	Hampton Coliseum	—N/a	—N/a
March 4, 1981	Lexington	United States	Rupp Arena	17,332 / 17,332	$182,952
March 5, 1981	Indianapolis	United States	Market Square Arena	14,632 / 14,632	$153,081
Europe
April 7, 1981	Hamburg	West Germany	Congress Centre	—N/a	—N/a
April 9, 1981	West Berlin	West Germany	Internationales Congress Centrum Berlin	—N/a	—N/a
April 11, 1981	Zürich	Switzerland	Hallenstadion	—N/a	—N/a
April 14, 1981	Frankfurt	West Germany	Festhalle	—N/a	—N/a
April 16, 1981	Munich	West Germany	Olympiahalle	—N/a	—N/a
April 18, 1981	Paris	France	Palais des Sports de Saint-Ouen	—N/a	—N/a
April 19, 1981	Paris	France	Palais des Sports de Saint-Ouen	—N/a	—N/a
April 21, 1981	Barcelona	Spain	Palau d'Esports de Montjuïc	—N/a	—N/a
April 24, 1981	Lyon	France	Palais des Sports de Gerland	—N/a	—N/a
April 26, 1981	Brussels	Belgium	Forest National	—N/a	—N/a
April 28, 1981	Rotterdam	Netherlands	Ahoy	—N/a	—N/a
April 29, 1981	Rotterdam	Netherlands	Ahoy	—N/a	—N/a
May 1, 1981	Copenhagen	Denmark	Forum	—N/a	—N/a
May 2, 1981	Copenhagen	Denmark	Brøndby Hall	—N/a	—N/a
May 3, 1981	Gothenburg	Sweden	Scandinavium	—N/a	—N/a
May 5, 1981	Oslo	Norway	Drammenshallen	—N/a	—N/a
May 7, 1981	Stockholm	Sweden	Johanneshovs Isstadion	—N/a	—N/a
May 8, 1981	Stockholm	Sweden	Johanneshovs Isstadion	—N/a	—N/a
May 11, 1981	Newcastle	England	Newcastle City Hall	—N/a	—N/a
May 13, 1981	Manchester	England	Manchester Apollo	—N/a	—N/a
May 14, 1981	Manchester	England	Manchester Apollo	—N/a	—N/a
May 16, 1981	Edinburgh	Scotland	Edinburgh Playhouse	—N/a	—N/a
May 17, 1981	Edinburgh	Scotland	Edinburgh Playhouse	—N/a	—N/a
May 20, 1981	Stafford	England	New Bingley Hall	—N/a	—N/a
May 26, 1981	Brighton	England	The Brighton Centre	—N/a	—N/a
May 27, 1981	Brighton	England	The Brighton Centre	—N/a	—N/a
May 29, 1981	London	England	Wembley Arena	—N/a	—N/a
May 30, 1981	London	England	Wembley Arena	—N/a	—N/a
June 1, 1981	London	England	Wembley Arena	—N/a	—N/a
June 2, 1981	London	England	Wembley Arena	—N/a	—N/a
June 4, 1981	London	England	Wembley Arena	—N/a	—N/a
June 5, 1981	London	England	Wembley Arena	—N/a	—N/a
June 7, 1981	Birmingham	England	National Exhibition Centre	—N/a	—N/a
June 8, 1981	Birmingham	England	National Exhibition Centre	—N/a	—N/a
North America
July 2, 1981	East Rutherford	United States	Brendan Byrne Arena	125,922 / 125,922	$1,500,345
July 3, 1981	East Rutherford	United States	Brendan Byrne Arena	125,922 / 125,922	$1,500,345
July 5, 1981	East Rutherford	United States	Brendan Byrne Arena	125,922 / 125,922	$1,500,345
July 6, 1981	East Rutherford	United States	Brendan Byrne Arena	125,922 / 125,922	$1,500,345
July 8, 1981	East Rutherford	United States	Brendan Byrne Arena	125,922 / 125,922	$1,500,345
July 9, 1981	East Rutherford	United States	Brendan Byrne Arena	125,922 / 125,922	$1,500,345
July 13, 1981	Philadelphia	United States	The Spectrum	92,272 / 92,272	$1,127,187
July 15, 1981	Philadelphia	United States	The Spectrum	92,272 / 92,272	$1,127,187
July 16, 1981	Philadelphia	United States	The Spectrum	92,272 / 92,272	$1,127,187
July 18, 1981	Philadelphia	United States	The Spectrum	92,272 / 92,272	$1,127,187
July 19, 1981	Philadelphia	United States	The Spectrum	92,272 / 92,272	$1,127,187
July 29, 1981	Richfield	United States	Richfield Coliseum	—N/a	—N/a
July 30, 1981	Richfield	United States	Richfield Coliseum	—N/a	—N/a
August 4, 1981	Landover	United States	Capital Centre (Landover, Maryland)	55,925 / 55,926	$671,112
August 5, 1981	Landover	United States	Capital Centre (Landover, Maryland)	55,925 / 55,926	$671,112
August 7, 1981	Landover	United States	Capital Centre (Landover, Maryland)	55,925 / 55,926	$671,112
August 11, 1981	Detroit	United States	Joe Louis Arena	—N/a	—N/a
August 12, 1981	Detroit	United States	Joe Louis Arena	—N/a	—N/a
August 16, 1981	Morrison	United States	Red Rocks Amphitheatre	17,000 / 17,000	$233,844
August 17, 1981	Morrison	United States	Red Rocks Amphitheatre	17,000 / 17,000	$233,844
August 20, 1981	Los Angeles	United States	Los Angeles Sports Arena	—N/a	—N/a
August 21, 1981	Los Angeles	United States	Los Angeles Sports Arena	—N/a	—N/a
August 23, 1981	Los Angeles	United States	Los Angeles Sports Arena	—N/a	—N/a
August 24, 1981	Los Angeles	United States	Los Angeles Sports Arena	—N/a	—N/a
August 27, 1981	Los Angeles	United States	Los Angeles Sports Arena	—N/a	—N/a
August 28, 1981	Los Angeles	United States	Los Angeles Sports Arena	—N/a	—N/a
September 2, 1981	San Diego	United States	Sports Arena	—N/a	—N/a
September 8, 1981	Rosemont	United States	Rosemont Horizon	—N/a	—N/a
September 10, 1981	Rosemont	United States	Rosemont Horizon	—N/a	—N/a
September 11, 1981	Rosemont	United States	Rosemont Horizon	—N/a	—N/a
September 13, 1981	Cincinnati	United States	Riverfront Coliseum	31,289 / 31,289	$378,057
September 14, 1981	Cincinnati	United States	Riverfront Coliseum	31,289 / 31,289	$378,057

== Sources ==
- Fred Schruers, "Bruce Springsteen and the Secret of the World", Rolling Stone, February 5, 1981.
- Born in the U.S.A. Tour (tour booklet, 1984), Springsteen chronology.
- Hilburn, Robert. Springsteen. Rolling Stone Press, 1985. ISBN 0-684-18456-7.
- Marsh, Dave. Glory Days: Bruce Springsteen in the 1980s. Pantheon Books, 1987. ISBN 0-394-54668-7.
- Santelli, Robert. Greetings From E Street: The Story of Bruce Springsteen and the E Street Band. Chronicle Books, 2006. ISBN 0-8118-5348-9.
- Killing Floor's concert database gives valuable coverage as well, but also does not support direct linking to individual dates.
- Brucebase's concert descriptions even more valuable coverage
- Setlists statistics page, for River Tour retrieval queries
