= The Ties That Bind: The River Collection =

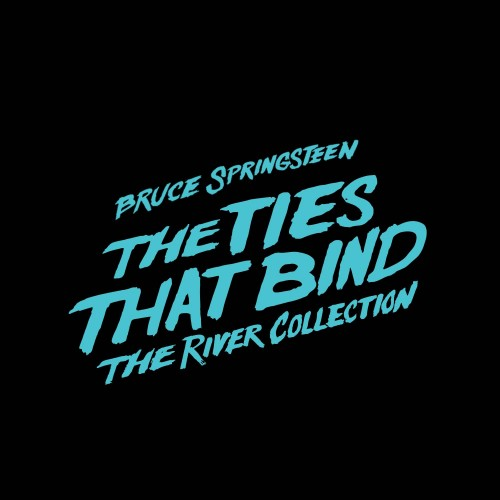

Box set by Bruce Springsteen
- Released: December 4, 2015
- Recorded: 1979–80, 2015
- Studios: Power Station, NY (1979–80) and Stone Hill Studio, NJ (2015)
- Genres: Rock; heartland rock
- Length: 197:47
- Label: Columbia
- Producer: Various

Bruce Springsteen chronology
| The Album Collection Vol. 1 1973–1984 (2014) | The Ties That Bind: The River Collection (2015) | Chapter and Verse (2016) |

Bruce Springsteen and the E Street Band chronology
| The Album Collection Vol. 1 1973–1984 (2014) | The Ties That Bind: The River Collection (2015) | Chapter and Verse (2016) |

Singles from The Ties That Bind: The River Collection
- 1. "Meet Me in the City" Released: October 16, 2015; 2. "Party Lights" Released: November 23, 2015

Professional ratings
Aggregate scores
| Source | Rating |
|---|---|
| Metacritic | 91/100 |
Review scores
| Source | Rating |
| AllMusic | 5/5 stars |
| American Songwriter | 5/5 stars |
| Consequence of Sound | A– |
| Exclaim! | 5/5 stars |
| The Independent | 4/5 stars |
| Paste | 8.0/10 |
| Pitchfork | 8.7/10 |
| Rolling Stone | 4.5/5 stars |

The Ties That Bind: The River Collection is a box set by the American singer-songwriter Bruce Springsteen. Released on December 4, 2015, the collection is an expanded edition of his 1980 album The River, containing 52 tracks on four CDs along with four hours of video on three DVDs or two Blu-ray discs. The first two CDs feature the remastered version of The River and the third CD contains the previously unreleased The Ties That Bind, a single LP originally intended for release in late 1979 before Springsteen expanded it to the final double LP. The fourth CD, The River: Outtakes, spans the entire The River sessions in 1979 and 1980 and contains eleven previously unreleased outtakes. The fifth disc (DVD or Blu-ray) contains a 60-minute documentary, The Ties That Bind, which was produced and directed by filmmaker Thom Zimny and features an interview with Springsteen as he reflects on writing and recording The River. The film transitions between Springsteen telling the stories behind the music—and illustrating them with solo acoustic guitar performances—interspersed with period concert footage and photos. The remaining disc(s) feature Bruce Springsteen & The E Street Band: The River Tour, Tempe 1980, a new film produced from footage professionally filmed in 1980 using four cameras and recorded in multitrack audio. The film features 23 of 33 songs performed, clocking in at 2 hours, 40 minutes on 2 DVDs (or one Blu-ray), from Springsteen's November 5, 1980, concert at Arizona State University in Tempe, Arizona. Also included is 20 minutes of footage from the late September 1980 River Tour rehearsals held in Lititz, Pennsylvania. The boxed set also includes a 148-page coffee table book featuring 200 rare or previously unseen photos and memorabilia, including a new essay by Mikal Gilmore.

On October 16, 2015, along with the announcement of the boxed set, "Meet Me in the City", one of the eleven unreleased outtakes, was released through Springsteen's website and on iTunes to promote the release of the boxed set. On November 23, 2015, "Party Lights" was released to promote the box set and made available through iTunes. Much like with The Promise, Springsteen recorded new vocals for some of the outtakes in the set.

Springsteen announced details for The River Tour 2016 on December 4, 2015. The tour began in January 2016 and features a full-album performance of The River at every show, as well as other songs from Springsteen's career. As of the end of the U.S. leg on April 25, 2016, "Meet Me in the City" opened all but one show; the song previously made its live debut when Springsteen and the E Street Band performed on the December 19, 2015, episode of Saturday Night Live.

On December 24, 2015, Springsteen released Arizona State University, Tempe 1980, a free download through the Bruce Springsteen Archives. The release contained the ten missing songs from the concert video featured in the boxed set.

== Track listing ==
All songs are written by Bruce Springsteen, except where noted.

CD 1. The River – Record One
| No. | Title | Length |
|---|---|---|
| 1. | "The Ties That Bind" | 3:33 |
| 2. | "Sherry Darling" | 4:02 |
| 3. | "Jackson Cage" | 3:04 |
| 4. | "Two Hearts" | 2:42 |
| 5. | "Independence Day" | 4:46 |
| 6. | "Hungry Heart" | 3:19 |
| 7. | "Out in the Street" | 4:17 |
| 8. | "Crush on You" | 3:10 |
| 9. | "You Can Look (But You Better Not Touch)" | 2:36 |
| 10. | "I Wanna Marry You" | 3:26 |
| 11. | "The River" | 4:59 |
| Total length: | | 39:54 |

CD 2. The River – Record Two
| No. | Title | Length |
|---|---|---|
| 1. | "Point Blank" | 6:05 |
| 2. | "Cadillac Ranch" | 3:02 |
| 3. | "I'm a Rocker" | 3:34 |
| 4. | "Fade Away" | 4:40 |
| 5. | "Stolen Car" | 3:53 |
| 6. | "Ramrod" | 4:04 |
| 7. | "The Price You Pay" | 5:27 |
| 8. | "Drive All Night" | 8:26 |
| 9. | "Wreck on the Highway" | 3:53 |
| Total length: | | 43:04 |

CD 3. The River: Single Album
| No. | Title | Length |
|---|---|---|
| 1. | "The Ties That Bind" | 3:36 |
| 2. | "Cindy" | 2:26 |
| 3. | "Hungry Heart" | 3:28 |
| 4. | "Stolen Car (Version 1)" | 4:31 |
| 5. | "Be True" | 3:54 |
| 6. | "The River" | 4:56 |
| 7. | "You Can Look (But You Better Not Touch) (Version 1)" | 2:09 |
| 8. | "The Price You Pay" | 5:51 |
| 9. | "I Wanna Marry You" | 3:28 |
| 10. | "Loose Ends" | 4:07 |
| Total length: | | 38:26 |

CD 4. The River: Outtakes
| No. | Title | Length |
|---|---|---|
| 1. | "Meet Me in the City" | 3:36 |
| 2. | "The Man Who Got Away" | 3:31 |
| 3. | "Little White Lies" | 2:29 |
| 4. | "The Time That Never Was" | 3:39 |
| 5. | "Night Fire" | 4:44 |
| 6. | "Whitetown" | 3:23 |
| 7. | "Chain Lightning" | 2:50 |
| 8. | "Party Lights" | 3:10 |
| 9. | "Paradise by the 'C'" | 3:11 |
| 10. | "Stray Bullet" | 6:10 |
| 11. | "Mr. Outside" | 2:16 |
| 12. | "Roulette" | 3:54 |
| 13. | "Restless Nights" | 3:46 |
| 14. | "Where the Bands Are" | 3:46 |
| 15. | "Dollhouse" | 3:33 |
| 16. | "Living on the Edge of the World" | 4:19 |
| 17. | "Take 'em as They Come" | 4:31 |
| 18. | "Ricky Wants a Man of Her Own" | 2:47 |
| 19. | "I Wanna Be with You" | 3:24 |
| 20. | "Mary Lou" | 3:23 |
| 21. | "Held Up Without a Gun" | 1:19 |
| 22. | "From Small Things (Big Things One Day Come)" | 2:42 |
| Total length: | | 76:23 |

DVD 1. The Ties That Bind (Documentary)
| No. | Title | Length |
|---|---|---|
| 1. | "Creative Life" |
| 2. | "Lost Boys" |
| 3. | "The River" |
| 4. | "Noisy Records" |
| 5. | "Searching for Something" |
| 6. | "The River Tour" |
| 7. | "Songs of Breadth and Depth" |
| 8. | "Personal Conversation" |
| 9. | "Credits" |
| Total length: | | 56:00 |

DVD 2. Thrill Hill Vault. The River Tour, Tempe 1980 Concert – Part 1
| No. | Title | Writer(s) | Length |
|---|---|---|---|
| 1. | "Born to Run" |
| 2. | "Prove It All Night" |
| 3. | "Tenth Avenue Freeze-Out" |
| 4. | "Jackson Cage" |
| 5. | "Two Hearts" |
| 6. | "The Promised Land" |
| 7. | "Out in the Street" |
| 8. | "The River" |
| 9. | "Badlands" |
| 10. | "Thunder Road" |
| 11. | "No Money Down" | Chuck Berry |
| 12. | "Cadillac Ranch" |
| 13. | "Hungry Heart" |
| 14. | "Fire" |
| 15. | "Sherry Darling" |
| 16. | "I Wanna Marry You" |
| 17. | "Crush on You" |
| 18. | "Ramrod" |
| 19. | "You Can Look (But You Better Not Touch)" |
| Total length: | | | 101:00 |

DVD 3. Thrill Hill Vault. The River Tour, Tempe 1980 Concert – Part 2
| No. | Title | Writer(s) | Length |
|---|---|---|---|
| 1. | "Drive All Night" |
| 2. | "Rosalita (Come Out Tonight)" |
| 3. | "I'm a Rocker" |
| 4. | "Jungleland" |
| 5. | "Detroit Medley" | Various |
| 6. | "Where the Bands Are (Credits)" |

Bonus: The River Tour Rehearsals
| No. | Title | Length |
|---|---|---|
| 7. | "Ramrod" |
| 8. | "Cadillac Ranch" |
| 9. | "Fire" |
| 10. | "Crush on You" |
| 11. | "Sherry Darling" |
| Total length: | | 57:00 |

== Unreleased outtakes ==
Springsteen wrote a large amount of music during album sessions, and even with the 2015 box set, many songs still remain unreleased. Songs such as "Held Up Without a Gun", "Be True", and "Roulette" were featured as B-sides, the first two on the album's singles and the last on a Tunnel of Love single. "Loose Ends", “Roulette”, "Restless Nights", "Where the Bands Are", "Dollhouse", "Living on the Edge of the World", "Take 'em as They Come", "Ricky Wants a Man of Her Own", "I Wanna Be with You", "Mary Lou" were released on the Tracks box set, while "From Small Things (Big Things One Day Come)" was released on The Essential Bruce Springsteen collection in 2003. An alternate version of "Stolen Car" was released on Tracks. During The River sessions, Springsteen also recorded demos of "Jole Blon", "Dedication", "Your Love", and "This Little Girl", in preparation for summer recording sessions he was co-producing for Gary U.S. Bonds. "Janey Needs a Shooter" was given to Warren Zevon, which he re-worked and recorded under the title "Jeannie Needs a Shooter;" Springsteen's own version of the song was later re-recorded for the 2020 album Letter to You. None of the demos recorded at Telegraph Hill Studios in Holmdel (the converted barn on Springsteen's property) in 1979 have ever been released, probably because of quality issues ("Night Fire" and "Meet Me In the City", on the outtakes disc, both featured 1979 Power Station backing and 2015 re-recorded vocals). Most can be found on the Lost Masters bootleg collection, released in the 1990s.

- "Janey Needs a Shooter"
- "Find It Where You Can"
- "Break My Heart"
- "Out on the Run (Looking for Love)"
- "Under the Gun"
- "I Don't Wanna Be"
- "Chevrolet Deluxe"
- "I Will Be the One (aka Slow Fade)"
- "Jole Blon"
- "Angelyne"
- "It's Okay"
- "A Thousand Tears (William Davis)"
- "Arnie
- "Tonight"
- "I'm Gonna Treat You Right"
- "Dedication"
- "Your Love"
- "This Little Girl"

== Personnel ==
Credits adapted from the box set liner notes.

CD 3

- Bruce Springsteen – lead vocals, guitar
- Roy Bittan – vocals, piano
- Clarence Clemons – percussion, saxophone
- Danny Federici – organ, keyboards
- Garry Tallent – bass
- Stevie Van Zandt – vocals, guitar
- Max Weinberg – drums
- Bruce Springsteen, Jon Landau, Stevie Van Zandt – production
- Neil Dorfsman, Bob Clearmountain – recording
- Bob Clearmountain – mixing
  - Jeff Hendrickson, Garry Rindfuss, Raymond Willhard, James Farber, Bill Scheniman – assistants
- Bob Ludwig – mastering

CD 4 (Note: unknown recording information on track 11)

- Bruce Springsteen – lead vocals, guitar
- Roy Bittan – vocals, piano
- Clarence Clemons – percussion, saxophone
- Danny Federici – organ, keyboards
- Garry Tallent – bass
- Stevie Van Zandt – vocals, guitar
- Max Weinberg – drums
- Bruce Springsteen, Jon Landau, Stevie Van Zandt – production
- Neil Dorfsman, Bob Clearmountain – recording (tracks 1–10)
- Toby Scott – additional recording (tracks 1–10)
  - Rob Lebret – assistant
- Neil Dorfsman – recording (tracks 12–22)
  - Jeff Hendrickson, Garry Rindfuss, Raymond Willhard, James Farber, Bill Scheniman – assistants
- Bob Clearmountain – mixing (tracks 1–10)
  - Sergio Ruelas Jr. – assistant
- Ed Thacker – mixing (tracks 12–20)
  - Ross Petersen – assistant
- Toby Scott, Chuck Plotkin – mixing (tracks 21, 22)
  - Dana Bisbee – assistant
- Bob Ludwig – mastering

DVD 1

- Thom Zimny – director, producer
- Zachary Russo – co-producer
- Bruce Springsteen, Jon Landau, Barbara Carr – executive producers
- Antonio Rossi – director of photography
- Barry Rebo – archival studio and performance footage original producer and director

DVD 2 & 3

- Bruce Springsteen – guitar, lead vocals, harmonica, maracas on "I Wanna Marry You"
- Roy Bittan – keyboards, backing vocals, organ on "I'm a Rocker"
- Clarence Clemons – saxophone, percussion, vocals
- Danny Federici – organ, keyboards on "I'm a Rocker"
- Garry Tallent – bass guitar, backing vocals on "I'm a Rocker"
- Stevie Van Zandt – guitar, vocals
- Max Weinberg – drums
- Thom Zimny – producer, editor
- Bruce Springsteen, Jon Landau, Barbara Carr, George Travis – executive producers
- Barry Rebo – archival performance footage original producer and director
- Zachary Russo – line producer
- Bob Clearmountain – mixing
- Bob Ludwig – mastering

Box set technical personnel

- Toby Scott – recording project supervisor, archival research, retrieval & restoration
- Jan Stabile – project coordinator
- Shari Sutcliffe – musician contractor
- Kevin Buell – guitars and technical services
- Michelle Holme – art direction and design
- Joel Bernstein, David Gahr, Lynn Goldsmith, Peter Howes, Lawrence Kirsch, Jim Marchese, Anastasia Pantsios, Jim Scott, Frank Stefanko, Jimmy Wachtel – photography
- Mikal Gilmore – "American River" (introductory essay)

== Charts ==
| Chart (2015–2016) | Peak position |
|---|---|
| Austrian Albums (Ö3 Austria) | 39 |
| Belgian Albums (Ultratop Flanders) | 13 |
| Belgian Albums (Ultratop Wallonia) | 92 |
| Danish Albums (Hitlisten) | 27 |
| Dutch Albums (Album Top 100) | 14 |
| Finnish Albums (Suomen virallinen lista) | 27 |
| German Albums (Offizielle Top 100) | 12 |
| Irish Albums (IRMA) | 24 |
| Italian Albums (FIMI) | 14 |
| Italian Albums (Musica e Dischi) | 39 |
| Norwegian Albums (VG-lista) | 8 |
| Spanish Albums (Promusicae) | 22 |
| Swedish Albums (Sverigetopplistan) | 5 |
| Swiss Albums (Schweizer Hitparade) | 20 |
| UK Albums (Official Charts) | 49 |
| US Billboard 200 | 31 |

== Certifications ==
| Region | Certification | Certified units/sales |
|---|---|---|
| United Kingdom (BPI) | Silver | 60,000^{‡} |
^{‡} Sales+streaming figures based on certification alone.
