= Mr. Outside =

Mr. Outside may refer to:

- Mr. Outside, a nickname of Glenn Davis (1924–2005), American football player
- Mr. Outside, a nickname of Jerry West (born 1938), American basketball player
- "Mr. Outside", a song by Bruce Springsteen on the 2015 album The Ties That Bind: The River Collection
- Mr. Outside, a character in the anime series Eden of the East
