= Arizona State University, Tempe 1980 =

Live album by Bruce Springsteen and the E Street Band
- Released: December 24, 2015
- Recorded: November 5, 1980
- Genre: Rock
- Length: 57:21
- Label: http://live.brucespringsteen.net
- Producer: Bob Clearmountain

Bruce Springsteen and the E Street Band chronology
The Ties That Bind: The River Collection (2015)	Arizona State University, Tempe 1980 (2015)	The Christic Shows 1990 (2016)

Arizona State University, Tempe 1980 is a live album by Bruce Springsteen and the E Street Band, released in December 2015 and was the ninth official release through the Bruce Springsteen Archives. The songs were performed on November 5, 1980, at the ASU Activity Center in Tempe, Arizona, during The River Tour. Unlike previous archive releases which contain full concerts, this ten-song collection includes only the songs that were missing from the live concert video release on Springsteen's 2015 box set The Ties That Bind: The River Collection.

== Track listing ==
All songs by Bruce Springsteen

=== Set One ===
1. "Darkness on the Edge of Town" – 5:08
2. "Independence Day" – 7:03
3. "Factory" – 3:16
4. "Racing in the Street" – 8:30
5. "Candy's Room" – 3:29
6. "The Ties That Bind" – 3:27
7. "Stolen Car" – 4:50
8. "Wreck on the Highway" – 4:56
9. "Point Blank" – 7:57
10. "Backstreets" – 8:29

== Personnel ==
- Bruce Springsteen – lead vocals, guitars, harmonica
- Roy Bittan – piano, background vocals
- Clarence Clemons – saxophone, percussion, background vocals
- Danny Federici – organ, electronic glockenspiel, background vocals
- Garry Tallent – bass guitar
- Steven Van Zandt – guitars, background vocals
- Max Weinberg – drums
