= Trapped (Jimmy Cliff song) =

Song performed by Jimmy Cliff

- Artwork for 1989 French vinyl release

Single by Jimmy Cliff
- B-side: "Struggling Man"
- Released: 1972
- Genre: Reggae
- Length: 3:48
- Label: Island
- Songwriter: Jimmy Cliff
- Producer: Cat Stevens

"Trapped" is a 1972 song written and recorded by reggae artist Jimmy Cliff and popularized by Bruce Springsteen in the 1980s.

== Cliff original ==
Cliff recorded "Trapped" as a single that was released in 1972. It was released on Island Records and backed with "Struggling Man", although some websites list the two reversed in some markets (the record saw release in areas that included the United Kingdom, Ghana, and the Caribbean region, but not the United States). Both songs were written during a downturn in Cliff's career that followed his 1960s hits and preceded the mid-1970s successes of the film The Harder They Come.

"Trapped" was arranged by Del Newman and produced by Cat Stevens. Cliff had recorded Stevens' "Wild World" a couple of years earlier, and here Stevens assembled a production recalling those found on his 1967 album Matthew and Son. The artist credit was billed on the 45-rpm label as being from Jimmy Cliff and Jamaica, the latter apparently being the backing group heard on the record.

Writer Dave Marsh has termed the lyrics "a cruel and vivid crescendo that build[s] to the point of snapping and end[s] each verse and chorus with an expostulated 'Trapped!'" In contrast, Lindsay Planer of AllMusic has termed the song "optimistic and funky".

Well it seem like I've been playin' the game way too long
And it seems the game I played has made you strong.
Well when the game is over, I won't walk out a loser,
And I know that I'll walk out of here again
And I know that someday I'll walk out of here again
But now I'm trapped, oh yeah! ...

In any case, in this original arrangement for Cliff, the lyrics are set against an up-tempo, perky reggae beat with organ, horns, and backing vocals.

The Cliff single did not attract much notice at the time and the song fell into obscurity. As Cliff later stated, "The single came out on the bottom of the British charts and fell out again. ... It wasn't put out on an album at all." In fact, it did not place at all on the UK Singles Chart.

"Trapped" was subsequently included on Cliff's mid-1970s compilation album Goodbye Yesterday but that record, too, soon became hard to find. The compilation version may have been edited to have a slightly shorter running time of 3:25.

== Bruce Springsteen version ==
"Trapped"

Song by Bruce Springsteen

from the album We Are the World
- Released: April 1985
- Recorded: 6 August 1984
- Venue: Meadowlands Arena in East Rutherford, New Jersey
- Genre: Rock
- Length: 5:11
- Label: Columbia
- Songwriter: Jimmy Cliff
- Producers: Bruce Springsteen; Chuck Plotkin

While on the European leg of The River Tour in Spring 1981, Springsteen purchased a cassette tape of Jimmy Cliff music in Amsterdam Airport Schiphol. He discovered "Trapped" on it and decided to incorporate it into his act, making an arrangement for the E Street Band that replaced the reggae rhythm with a straight rock one. He additionally substantially recast it as a slower, dirge-like piece framed by Roy Bittan's synthesizer punctuated by arena-style choruses.

Springsteen's take on the song was first performed on 29 May 1981, during the opening night of a six-show run at Wembley Arena in London; this was a crucial show for Springsteen in getting past his uncertain past in London dating to the Born to Run tours, and biographer Marsh has termed Springsteen's inclusion of an unknown song in such a show a mark of his artistic fortitude. "Trapped" remained in the set list during Springsteen's homecoming leg in the U.S. later in 1981.

"Trapped" remained in Springsteen's repertoire during the 1984–85 Born in the U.S.A. Tour. One such performance was at Meadowlands Arena in New Jersey on 6 August 1984, which was recorded and later released in April 1985 as one of the previously unreleased selections incorporated on the superstar charity recording for famine relief efforts in Ethiopia, the album We Are the World. The album became a chart-topper and sold several million copies, and thus "Trapped" gained considerable airplay, the most of any of the tracks on the album other than the title song. Among Springsteen audiences it became a favorite during later performances on the Born in the U.S.A. Tour and, with its Springsteen-like themes of both troubles and hope, has often been considered one of the show's anthems. Though Springsteen's rock version was not released as a single, it peaked at number one on the Billboard Top Rock Tracks chart.

Regarding Springsteen's version of the song, Cliff commented in 1988, "I look at it as a compliment. ... He's an artist in his own right and he's written a lot of good songs, too. It's good when an established artist does your work and does it in his way. I've also done other people's work. I recorded Cat Stevens' 'Wild World', a big hit in Europe, and I did it my way. From a commercial point of view, I didn't gain from ['Trapped']. All the royalties were donated to the cause and I gained in the moral sense that I have done something for the cause."

Critical response to Springsteen's "Trapped" was positive. Ken Tucker of Knight-Ridder Newspapers wrote that the Springsteen recording was "easily the most powerful music on We Are the World, and for a reason that seems to have eluded the creators of the album's title song: Springsteen understands that to make a donation (of money, of time, of talent) isn't enough; you have to make a statement as well, to let your audience know where you stand. Springsteen's choice is brilliant. Singing in the words of a black man who is railing eloquently about the political oppression closing in on him, leaving him 'trapped', Springsteen offers an exciting performance of a significant song."

Al Walentis of the Reading Eagle wrote that it was one of only two songs on the album that "showcase material that ranks with the singers' most potent", the other being Tina Turner's interpretation of the Motels' "Total Control", and said that it "starts off tense and edgy then revs up" in a manner that resembles Springsteen's "Backstreets".

Eric Thurm of The A.V. Club, writing in 2014, commented, "The album's best cut – Bruce Springsteen's live rendition of Jimmy Cliff's 'Trapped' – works because, in contrast to the rest of We Are The World, it's deeply specific. The song's narrator is the one who's 'wearing the same old chains,' rather than a faceless mass – he's channeling one person instead of millions, which is what renders most of the album devoid of personality."

== Later history ==
In the view of music writer Dave Thompson, the success of Springsteen's "Trapped" help improve Cliff's visibility, along with the Jamaican's direct involvement in the same year's Artists United Against Apartheid.

Cliff re-recorded "Trapped" for release on his 1989 album Images (which in the United Kingdom was called Save Our Planet Earth) on the label Cliff Sounds and Films. Here it was longer, with a running time of 4:33, and had vocal phrasings and emphases that more closely resembled Springsteen's, albeit still with a reggae beat. It was released as a 7-inch and 12-inch single, the latter of which also contained various remixes for radio and club use. This single did not chart.

Cliff performs the songs in his concerts, often sounding fairly close to the Springsteen version in some of his singing, although the music remains definitely his. In November 1989, Springsteen jumped onstage during a Cliff performance at the Stone Pony in Asbury Park, New Jersey, and the two performed a long version of "Trapped" together in a manner that more closely resembled Cliff's original than Springsteen's interpretation.

The original recording of "Trapped" was included on Cliff's 2003 Anthology compilation. A live performance is part of his 2013 release The KCRW Session.

Springsteen has continued to perform the song, including during the 1992–93 "Other Band" Tour, where the replacement of the E Street Band did not alter fan reaction to the number. Writer Daniel Cavicchi has analyzed the audience reaction to his arrangement as the "power of the moment" in the quiet portions in between when "everyone sang angrily, punching a fist in the air to punctuate the lines" of the chorus. "Trapped" has continued to make appearances during the 1999–2000 Bruce Springsteen and the E Street Band Reunion Tour and in the various E Street tours of the Reunion Era beyond.

The 1984 live "Trapped" was included as one of the items on the bonus disc of the 2003 compilation The Essential Bruce Springsteen. In 2014, "Trapped" was named by Rolling Stone magazine as one of the top ten best Bruce Springsteen "deep cuts", one which many do not realize is not a Springsteen original.
