= The School (Norwegian band) =

Former Norwegian rock band

- Origin: Trondheim, Norway
- Genres: Indie rock, Post-punk revival
- Years active: 2004—2010, 2019– (as NSB)
- Labels: Kong Tiki Records
- Members: Stig Førde Aarskog; Thor-Inge Hoddevik; Karl-Martin Hoddevik; Andreas Elvenes; Per Andreas "Puppy" Gulbrandsen

The School was a Norwegian indie rock and post-punk revival band from Trondheim, formed in 2004. After releasing two albums on the Oslo label Kong Tiki, they broke up in 2010. In 2019, they began collaborating with rapper Trond Wiger as NSB.

== History ==
The School formed in 2004. It was named after an unpublished novel written by one of the guitarists. The five members sang at funerals, played in military bands, and sold advertisements, among other jobs.

In January 2006, they released a self-produced EP titled Mädchen, recorded in a studio in Svartlamoen. It contained four tracks and was only available locally. They were a surprise success at by:Larm in Tromsø in 2006, leading to other live performances, including at Øyafestivalen and Quartfestivalen, and their signing by Kong Tiki Records.

Their first album, Espionage, was released by Kong Tiki in September 2006. It was produced at a Larsville studio in Stugudalen by John Fryer. To promote the album, a viral marketing attempt was made through a hidden page on their website that could be unlocked with a password printed in the album CD inlay and from which a bonus track called "Killing the Night" could be downloaded. The album was nominated for Spellemannprisen in the rock category.

The School recorded their second album, Destructive Sounds, in New York with Chris Ribando producing. It was released in September 2008 and was nominated for NRK Sogn og Fjordane's Luttprisen. The single "Radio Girl" was popular, and the band was described as "a blend of Franz Ferdinand and Queens Of The Stone Age", playing "good decadent dance rock", and as having "evolved from post-punk to post-post-punk, with a stricter focus on pop melodies and catchy choruses. Just like most other bands in the same genre ... [w]hich doesn't mean it isn't good."

After releasing "Minds Off" as a split single with Dog & Sky in 2010, The School broke up, with a farewell party held in November that year.

The band held a reunion concert in November 2016 to mark the anniversary of Espionage. They made a joint appearance with rapper Trond Wiger at Trondheim Calling 2019, and continued the collaboration as NSB, releasing a limited-edition four-song EP on cassettes in 2019 and an album, Kajsa Kajsa, in December 2020.

== Discography ==
=== EPs ===
- Mädchen (2006)

=== Studio albums ===
- Espionage (2006)
- Destructive Sounds (2008)
- Kajsa Kajsa (2020, as NSB)

=== Singles ===
- "Bad to the Bone" (2006)
- "Pick up the Phone" (2006)
- "Radio Girl" (2008)
- "Minds Off"(2010)

== Members ==
- Stig Førde Aarskog - Vocals / guitar
- Thor-Inge Hoddevik - Lead Guitar
- Karl-Martin Hoddevik - Bass
- Andreas Elvenes - Keyboards / backing vocals
- Per Andreas "Puppy" Gulbrandsen - Drums
