= Out in the Street =

1980 song by Bruce Springsteen

Song by Bruce Springsteen

from the album The River
- Released: October 1980
- Recorded: Between March and May 1980
- Studio: Power Station, New York City
- Genre: New wave; garage rock
- Length: 4:17
- Label: Columbia
- Songwriter(s): Bruce Springsteen
- Producer(s): Jon Landau; Bruce Springsteen; Steven Van Zandt

"Out in the Street" is a song written and performed by Bruce Springsteen from the 1980 album The River. It was recorded at The Power Station in New York between March and May 1980, as one of the last songs recorded for the album. Originally, Springsteen was going to keep the song off the album because it was so idealistic.

While the album is noted for the juxtaposition of dark emotional songs ("The River", "Independence Day") and upbeat pop songs ("The Ties That Bind", "Hungry Heart"), "Out in the Street" is a mixture of both themes. Along with "The Ties That Bind" and "Two Hearts", "Out in the Street" is one of the key songs on The River about the need for community. The lyrics are reminiscent of the girl/party theme, and also evoke empathy for the blue collar working class. However, there is a sense of freedom in the chorus when the protagonist of the song leaves work and walks "out in the street".

The song features an echoing piano line played by Roy Bittan and also features a saxophone solo from Clarence Clemons. The final coda features weaving vocals from Springsteen, Roy Bittan, and Steven Van Zandt. For one line, Springsteen stops singing, leaving just Steven Van Zandt singing the "meet me out in the street" refrain and sounding like a plea to be met, altering the tone of the song for that moment from its otherwise assertiveness. During the recording of "Out in the Street", Max Weinberg struggled with time-keeping, leading him to take lessons from the drummer Sonny Igoe.

"Out in the Street" has become a live favorite for E Street Band concerts and was performed at length during the 1999–2000 Reunion Tour, as captured on the Live in New York City album and video. During The River Tour, the vocal weaving was performed similar to the record. However, with Steve Van Zandt's absence on the Born in the U.S.A. Tour, the vocal weaving was occupied by Patti Scialfa and Nils Lofgren with Roy Bittan no longer singing. By the Reunion Tour, the vocal weaving was split between Springsteen, Van Zandt, Scialfa, Lofgren, and Clarence Clemons. Springsteen also has the audience join in.

CBS soap opera Guiding Light had one of its character Brandon/Lujack Luvonaczek Spaulding played by actor Vincent Michael Irizarry cover the song with a video in which it aired on its serial in the spring of 1985 as part of a storyline.

== Personnel ==
According to authors Philippe Margotin and Jean-Michel Guesdon, except where noted:

- Bruce Springsteen – vocals, guitars
- Roy Bittan – piano, backing vocals (during coda)
- Clarence Clemons – saxophone, tambourine
- Danny Federici – organ
- Garry Tallent – bass
- Steven Van Zandt – guitars, harmony and backing vocals
- Max Weinberg – drums
