= Frank Stefanko =

American fine art photographer

Frank Stefanko (born 1946) is an American fine art photographer with connections to New Jersey performers Patti Smith and Bruce Springsteen. Stefanko's early photographs, taken in the 1960s through the 1980s, reveal the emerging careers of the two young artists. Frank retains an ongoing working relationship with both Springsteen and Smith. A limited edition book was released in November 2017, entitled Bruce Springsteen: Further Up the Road. The book chronicles the 40-year working relationship between Stefanko and Bruce Springsteen. It contains personal stories and hundreds of Frank's photos from the 1960s to 2017, many never before seen.

== Early life ==
Stefanko was born in Philadelphia, Pennsylvania, United States, and has been absorbed by photography since he was given an old box-camera when about seven years of age. Frank Senior (an accomplished carpenter) built a darkroom for his son in their row-home basement in Camden, New Jersey. Among youthful Stefanko's early "teachers" and inspirations were stark, black-and-white film noir movies, cinematographers such as James Wong Howe, Fritz Lang, and reality photographers such as Diane Arbus, who shot every-day people in natural settings. Stefanko received fine-art training at Glassboro College (now Rowan University) in Glassboro, New Jersey.

It was at Glassboro State College, in the mid-1960s, that Stefanko met and became friends with Patti Smith. He began photographing her even before Robert Mapplethorpe did. Those Patti Smith photographs led to an introduction to Bruce Springsteen. Springsteen saw the portraits and inquired about the photographer. Later, Springsteen called Stefanko to set up a date for some trial photos.

== Photographing Bruce Springsteen ==
Stefanko was a resident of Haddonfield, New Jersey, for many years.

"Springsteen hadn't recorded anything in quite a while. The Darkness on the Edge of Town album that we worked on back in 1978... was kind of like his re-emergence. He had been kind of out of the loop for a few years and was coming back", quotes Stefanko. The two men spent several days shooting photos in and around Haddonfield and Camden, NJ, as well as in Stefanko's Haddonfield home. The album cover of Darkness, which features Springsteen lounging against pale-flowered, Cabbage Rose wall-paper, was taken in Stefanko's bedroom in 1978. The entire E-Street Band came down and were photographed in the same environs.

In Springsteen's autobiography, Born to Run, he describes Stefanko's photos as "...stark. He managed to strip away your celebrity, your artifice.... They were lovely and true.... he naturally intuited the conflicts I was struggling to come to terms with." In September 2016, when Springsteen released his autobiography, he chose Stefanko's 1978 photograph titled "Corvette Winter" to be on the cover. It depicts Springsteen leaning on the front of his Corvette, with a Haddonfield, New Jersey, home and porch behind him. The Corvette image also appears on the CD Chapter and Verse.

Stefanko's photographs of Springsteen also grace the album covers of Darkness on the Edge of Town and The River. Regarding the cover-art for The River, "... the back cover was "not thought out" — given not only Springsteen's penchant for overthinking, but also the thematic ties of Frank Stefanko's store window image, including its depiction of bride(s) and groom, and the first use of the American flag on a Springsteen album."

Stefanko's photos appear in Springsteen's Live 1975–1985 CD, in Tracks, Greatest Hits, in the book Greetings from E Street by Robert Santelli, American Madness by Julio Blanco, as well as in books by Dave Marsh and in BRUCE, by Peter Carlin. Stefanko also created the covers for Southside Johnny's Hearts of Stone album, the Shonde's album The Garden, and for Songs of Springsteen, to benefit Radio Station 105.7 "THE HAWK". Many of Stefanko's photos, including some never before seen, appear in the special edition, remastered thirtieth-anniversary box-set of Darkness and in the documentary The Promise, released in November 2010. Stefanko appears in a brief interview in The Promise.

His images have been shown in the exhibition "Springsteen: Troubadour of the Highway", which toured the US from 2002 to 2004, sponsored by the Frederick R. Weisman Art Museum in Minneapolis. Colleen Sheehy, curator of the production, is quoted as saying, "Frank Stefanko's photographs show a sublime convergence of singer and image at a critical point in Springsteen's career". The "Troubadour" show appeared at the Cranbrook Art Museum, The Experience Music Project, the Newark Museum of Art, and at Monmouth University.

Stefanko donated photos which will raise funds to benefit the Food Bank of North Jersey, for relief of Hurricane Sandy.

Some of Stefanko's Springsteen photographs, along with those taken by Danny Clinch, appeared at Philadelphia's National Constitution Center as part of the Rock and Roll Hall of Fame's exhibition "From Asbury Park to the Promised Land", in February through September 2012. Springsteen's 1960 Corvette, along with Stefanko's photo of Springsteen posing with that same Corvette, were at the entrance. Photos by Stefanko, Danny Clinch, Eric Meola (Born to Run), and Pam Springsteen are featured in the Grammy Museum's traveling show Bruce Springsteen, a Photographic Journey, which opened at the Woodie Guthrie Center, in Tulsa, Oklahoma, in April 2014. In 2015, the show toured other venues.

== Books ==
Days of Hope and Dreams: an intimate Portrait of Bruce Springsteen is Stefanko's first book, published in 2003. The black and white images taken from 1978 to 1982. The book contains recollections and anecdotes of the friendship between the two men. In the book's introduction, Springsteen says: "The cover shot of 'Darkness' was taken in Frank's bedroom, and any exterior shots were taken either in Frank's yard or on the streets of Haddonfield [NJ]. The pictures were raw. Frank had a way of stripping away any celebrity refuse you may have picked up along the way, and finding the you in you....Frank always shot your internal life. He let your external imperfections show. His photos had a purity and poetry...."

Patti Smith-American Artist (2006) contains intimate photographs, along with Stefanko's first-hand accounts, capture the period of cultural change from the mid-1960s to the late 1970s, when a new genre of music was being born. The book chronicles young Smith's emergence as a writer, painter, singer-songwriter, performer, poet, mystic, and political activist.

Bruce Springsteen: Further Up the Road, published in November 2017 by Wall of Sound Editions is limited to 1978 copies. It chronicles forty years of the collaboration between Springsteen and Stefanko.

== Publications ==
- Days of Hope and Dreams: An Intimate Portrait of Bruce Springsteen. Watson-Guptill, 2003. Insight, 2003. Watson-Guptill, 2003. ISBN 0-8230-8387-X. Second Edition, 2011, Insight. ISBN 1-60887-031-6.
- Patti Smith-American Artist. Insight, 2006. ISBN 1-933784-06-7.
  - Second edition. Insight, 2017. ISBN 978-1-68383-015-3.
- Bruce Springsteen: Further Up the Road. Wall of Sound, 2017.
