= The Ties That Bind (Bruce Springsteen song) =

1979 song by Bruce Springsteen

Song by Bruce Springsteen

from the album The River
- Recorded: April 9–11, 1979
- Studio: Power Station, New York City
- Genre: Rock; jangle pop
- Length: 3:34
- Label: Columbia Records
- Songwriter: Bruce Springsteen
- Producers: Jon Landau, Bruce Springsteen, Steven Van Zandt

"The Ties That Bind" is a song written and performed by the American singer-songwriter Bruce Springsteen. It is the opening song on his fifth album, The River. It was the second song recorded for 'The River', at The Power Station in New York on April 9–11, 1979. The recording engineer was Bob Clearmountain. After Springsteen injured himself driving an ATV, forcing a one-month halt, Neil Dorfsman became the chief engineer when sessions resumed. Springsteen wrote the song during September - October 1978, while on the road during the Darkness Tour. After introducing it on November 1, 1978, it was played every night during the final two months of the tour.

"The Ties That Bind" was sequenced as the title track of an album to be released in late 1979. After being mixed and mastered, Springsteen cancelled plans, and returned to recording. When sessions completed in May 1980, the project was expanded to become the double album The River. The contents of the 1979 album was eventually released on December 4, 2015, as part of The Ties That Bind: The River Collection. The box set contains a 60- minute documentary, The Ties That Bind by Thom Zimny and features an interview with Springsteen on writing and recording of The River. The film illustrates the music with solo acoustic guitar performances, period concert footage, and photos of Bruce and the band.

The songs on The River reveal a tension between the need for community and the need to be alone. "The Ties That Bind", along with "Two Hearts" and "Out in the Street", is one of the key songs on the album about the need for community. Author Rob Kirkpatrick describes the song as "a challenge to a hurt woman not to forsake love but rather to accept the ties of relationships. It is a theme Springsteen would later reuse in his 1992 single "Human Touch." Rolling Stone critic Paul Nelson cited the lyrics to "The Ties That Bind" as an example of "simple yet sturdy" lyrics that are "filled with an uncommon common sense and intelligence that could only have come from an exceptionally warmhearted but wary graduate of the street of hard knocks. It is a pulsing rocker that was influenced by Jackie DeShannon's "When You Walk in the Room", Creedence Clearwater Revival's "Who'll Stop the Rain" and by The Searchers.

The earliest known version of "The Ties That Bind" was performed as part of the soundcheck for a concert on September 20, 1978, at the Capitol Theatre in Passaic, New Jersey. In that version, the theme was reversed from the ultimate version; rather than being about the need for community it was about the need to be alone and for escape. Music critic Clinton Heylin regards this version as being "magnificent," "with a great pop hook set to a strong if undeveloped lyrical idea," with lyrics such as "No one at my side/There's just a cold, dark highway and a thin white line/Which will lead me to the ties that bind." By the time Springsteen began to perform it in concert in late autumn of 1978, the song had taken a form similar to its ultimate form, but Heylin regards the original version as being superior.

"The Ties That Bind" became a popular song in concert over the years, with over 300 performances through 2020. An encyclopedia about Bruce Springsteen took its name from the title of this song.

== Personnel ==
According to authors Philippe Margotin and Jean-Michel Guesdon:

- Bruce Springsteen – vocals, guitars
- Clarence Clemons – saxophone
- Garry Tallent – bass
- Steven Van Zandt – guitars
- Max Weinberg – drums
