= Fade Away (Bruce Springsteen song) =

1981 single by Bruce Springsteen

Single by Bruce Springsteen

from the album The River
- B-side: "Be True"
- Released: January 22, 1981
- Recorded: March 17 – June 23, 1980
- Studio: Power Station, New York City
- Genre: Rock; pop soul
- Length: 4:46
- Label: Columbia
- Songwriter: Bruce Springsteen
- Producers: Jon Landau; Bruce Springsteen; Steven Van Zandt

Bruce Springsteen US singles chronology
"Hungry Heart" (1980)	"Fade Away" (1981)	"I Wanna Marry You" (1981)

Bruce Springsteen UK singles chronology
"Hungry Heart" (1980)	"Fade Away" (1981)	"Sherry Darling" (1981)

"Fade Away" is a 1980 song written and performed by Bruce Springsteen, accompanied by the E Street Band. It is included on his album The River, and the second single released from it in the United States, reaching the top twenty in both the United States and Canada.

== History ==
The song was recorded at the Power Station in New York in March to June 1980, one of the last songs to be recorded for the album. Musically and lyrically it is a slow, pained lament:

Well now, you say you've found another man, who does things to you that I can't
And that no matter what I do, it's all over now between me and you girl
But I can't believe what you say
No, I can't believe what you say ...

Rock author Jimmy Guterman wrote that "Fade Away" is "certainly among his most pessimistic and helpless depictions of life and love gone wrong." Record World said that "Bruce expresses every man's fears with all the genuine emotional intensity that's come to make his ballads special."

This was the second single taken from The River, released in February 1981 in the U.S. and in Canada, Australia, and New Zealand. (In the UK and Europe, " The River" was released instead.) In the U.S., "Fade Away" was not as successful as the previous single from the album, "Hungry Heart", but still reached #20 on the U.S. pop singles chart. It was only performed sporadically on The River Tour, and not at all for nearly the first two months. The judgement behind its selection as the second single was questioned, considering the more radio-friendly songs on the record, and the choice was blamed for slowing down sales of the album. It was then dropped from Springsteen's concert repertoire completely, only rematerializing for a handful of solo renditions on the 2005 Devils & Dust Tour. E Streeter Steve Van Zandt has proclaimed "Fade Away" as one of his favorite Springsteen songs, but thinks that it is not played in band shows because it is too slow. Regardless, he says, "It's just one of those funny, lost little gems, you know?" It was finally given an E Street Band performance again at Stockholms Stadion on June 7, 2009, during the European second leg of the Working on a Dream Tour; Springsteen made reference on stage to Van Zandt's desire to hear it. The song was performed once on the Wrecking Ball Tour on July 20, 2013, at King's Hall in Belfast; Springsteen made reference on stage that it was Van Zandt's favorite song. The song was played nightly during the North American leg of Springsteen's 2016 River Tour, where The River was played in its entirety. When the tour reached Europe, the album presentation format of the tour was dropped, with the exception of a few shows. "Fade Away" has not been performed outside of the album format.

Meanwhile, Southside Johnny and the Asbury Jukes (old Van Zandt cohorts) had added "Fade Away" to his concerts from the 1980s on, and it would be included on his 1997 Spittin' Fire live album. Southside's renditions have often been of a slow, bluesy nature, accompanied only by bandmate Bobby Bandiera.

== Track listing ==
1. Fade Away – 4:46
2. Be True – 3:39

"Be True" is a track from The River sessions that continued the new Springsteen tradition of using songs that did not appear on his albums as B-sides. It was recorded on July 21, 1979, at the Power Station, in one of the first sessions for the album. According to Springsteen, "Be True" was left off The River album in favor of the song "Crush on You", a decision he has a hard time understanding in retrospect. Although left off the album and released only as a B-side of a single, "Be True" reached #42 on the Billboard Mainstream Rock chart. A featured selection on the 1988 Tunnel of Love Express, a live version from that tour was included on the Chimes of Freedom EP. The studio recording of "Be True" was eventually released on the Tracks box set in 1998.

== Personnel ==
According to authors Philippe Margotin and Jean-Michel Guesdon:

- Bruce Springsteen – vocals, guitars
- Roy Bittan – piano
- Clarence Clemons – tambourine, shaker
- Danny Federici – organ
- Garry Tallent – bass
- Steven Van Zandt – guitars, vocal harmonies
- Max Weinberg – drums

== Chart history ==
Chart (1981)	Peak position
U.S. Billboard Hot 100	20
Quebec (ADISQ)	17
