= Sherry Darling =

Single by Bruce Springsteen

from the album The River
- B-side: "Be True"
- Released: February 20, 1981
- Recorded: May–April 1980
- Studio: Power Station (New York City)
- Genre: Rock
- Length: 4:03
- Label: Columbia
- Songwriter: Bruce Springsteen
- Producers: Bruce Springsteen, Jon Landau, Steven Van Zandt

Bruce Springsteen singles chronology
"Fade Away" (1981)	"Sherry Darling" (1981)	"The River" (1981)

"Sherry Darling" is a song by American singer-songwriter Bruce Springsteen from his fifth studio album The River. Originally written for his previous album, 1978's Darkness on the Edge of Town, the song was rejected for not fitting that album's somber tone. The song's frat crowd noises were meant to evoke early rock and roll songs like "Louie, Louie," which similarly had loud incidental crowd noises.

Considered for single release sporadically since 1978, "Sherry Darling" was ultimately released as a single in the UK and Europe in 1981. Though not charting, the song has become a live favorite and has attracted positive reception from music writers.

== Background ==
"Sherry Darling" was first written and recorded in 1977 during the sessions for Springsteen's 1978 album Darkness on the Edge of Town. Footage of Springsteen performing an early version of the song on piano for Steven Van Zandt can be found in The Promise: The Making of Darkness on the Edge of Town; while the lyrics at this stage were incomplete, Van Zandt can be seen laughing at the song's comical lyrics. Ultimately, the song was left off because Springsteen thought it was too upbeat for the album. He explained:

How could a happy song like 'Sherry Darling' coexist with 'Point Blank' or 'Darkness on the Edge of Town'? I couldn't face that. I wasn't ready for some reason within myself to feel those things. It was too confusing, too paradoxical.

Springsteen chose to record several Darkness rejects for his next album The River, "Sherry Darling" among them, after realizing "life had paradoxes, a lot of them, and you've got to live with them." The studio recording on The River features cheering crowd noises, channeling what Springsteen described as the "fraternity rock" tradition of songs like "Louie, Louie" and "Farmer John" where "the audience was at least twice as loud as the band." Billboard opined that this party style contrasted humorously with the song's lyrics "about a guy stuck driving his girl’s pain-in-the-ass mother to the unemployment agency."

== Release ==
"Sherry Darling" had long been a contender for single release. At a 1978 show, he introduced the song saying, "This is called 'Sherry Darling.' It should've been a single, it should've been released in the summertime." In 1980, Springsteen again considered releasing the song as a single in the summer before the release of The River. In 1981, the song was ultimately released as a single in the UK and other European territories, with either "Be True" or "Independence Day" as the B-side. The single failed to chart in any country.

== Critical reception ==
Billboard wrote that Springsteen "nails the vibe" of the party records he sought to emulate. The Star-Ledger ranked the song as Springsteen's 24th best, commenting, "There are none better on The River's list of boisterous rock jams than 'Sherry Darling,' a fun-filled romp that curses Bruce's lover's mother and 'her big feet.'" Music writer Jim Beviglia ranked it as the 55th best Springsteen song, writing, "'Sherry Darling,' in uproarious fashion, retrieved the jovial jokester lurking beneath the earnest songsmith." Vulture ranked it as his 72nd best.

== Live history ==
"Sherry Darling" had been a live favorite for Springsteen in the years before its studio release, appearing on his setlist during the Darkness Tour while it was still a work in progress. Springsteen performed the song in 1979 for the No Nukes concerts, organized by MUSE. Before the live album for these concerts was released in 2021 as The Legendary 1979 No Nukes Concerts, the live concert video for "Sherry Darling" was released as a promo for the collection. The song has since become a live favorite over the course of several Springsteen tours to the present day. During performances for the River Tour, Springsteen would pick a girl from the front row, bring her to the stage, and dance with her. This act would be replicated in the music video for "Dancing in the Dark" with Courteney Cox.

== Personnel ==
According to authors Philippe Margotin and Jean-Michel Guesdon:

- Bruce Springsteen – vocals, guitars
- Roy Bittan – piano
- Clarence Clemons – saxophone, maracas
- Danny Federici – organ
- Garry Tallent – bass
- Steven Van Zandt – guitars, vocal harmonies
- Max Weinberg – drums
- The band – handclaps, backing vocals, party noises

== Charts ==
Chart (1981)	Peak position
UK Singles Top 100 (Record Business)	48
