= The River (Bruce Springsteen album) =

1980 album by Bruce Springsteen

Studio album by Bruce Springsteen
- Released: October 17, 1980
- Recorded: March 1979 – August 1980
- Studio: Power Station (New York City)
- Genres: Heartland rock; rock and roll; R&B; folk; country; pop
- Length: 82:58
- Label: Columbia
- Producers: Bruce Springsteen; Jon Landau; Steven Van Zandt

Bruce Springsteen chronology
Darkness on the Edge of Town (1978)	The River (1980)	Nebraska (1982)

Bruce Springsteen and the E Street Band chronology
Darkness on the Edge of Town (1978)	The River (1980)	Born in the U.S.A. (1984)

Singles from The River
- 1. "Hungry Heart" Released: October 21, 1980; 2. "Fade Away" Released: January 22, 1981; 3. "Sherry Darling" Released: February 1981; 4. "The River" Released: April 1981 (UK); 5. "Cadillac Ranch" Released: August 1981 (UK); 6. "Point Blank" Released: 1981 (Netherlands); 7. "I Wanna Marry You" Released: 1981 (Japan)

The River is the fifth studio album by the American singer-songwriter Bruce Springsteen, released as a double album on October 17, 1980, through Columbia Records. The album was Springsteen's attempt to capture the E Street Band's live sound on record. Co-produced by Springsteen, his manager Jon Landau, and bandmate Steven Van Zandt, the recording sessions lasted 18 months in New York City from March 1979 to August 1980. Springsteen originally planned to release a single LP, The Ties That Bind, in late 1979, before deciding it did not fit his vision and scrapped it. Over 50 songs were recorded, with outtakes being released as B-sides, or on compilation albums.

The River is a heartland rock and rock and roll record with a live garage-band sound, combining party songs with introspective ballads. The lyrics expand on the themes of Springsteen's previous albums Born to Run (1975) and Darkness on the Edge of Town (1978) and mainly focus on love, marriage, and family. Springsteen took inspiration from the writer Flannery O'Connor for the characterizations. The cover photograph of Springsteen was taken by Frank Stefanko, who also took the front cover photograph of Darkness on the Edge of Town.

The River became Springsteen's first album to top the Billboard Top LPs & Tape chart in the US and was his fastest-selling album yet. It was also a commercial success elsewhere, topping the chart in Canada and Norway, and reaching number two in the UK. It spawned several singles, including "Hungry Heart", a US top ten, "Fade Away", and "The River". Springsteen and the E Street Band supported the album on The River Tour from October 1980 to September 1981.

Upon release, music critics praised the songwriting, the performances of the E Street Band, and the lyrical evolution, while others believed Springsteen was recycling old material and lacking in creativity. In later decades, The River has been regarded as one of Springsteen's finest works, although many critics remain divided on the album's consistency. It has appeared on best-of lists, while several songs foreshadowed the direction Springsteen took on his next album, the solo effort Nebraska (1982). The River was reissued as an expanded box set in 2015, featuring the scrapped single LP, The Ties That Bind, and a documentary detailing the album's making.

== Background ==
Bruce Springsteen supported his fourth studio album Darkness on the Edge of Town on the Darkness Tour from May 1978 to January 1979, performing with the E Street Band – Roy Bittan (piano), Clarence Clemons (saxophone), Danny Federici (organ), Garry Tallent (bass), Steven Van Zandt (guitar), and Max Weinberg (drums). Upon the tour's completion, he began preparations for his next studio record. Having grown closer with the E Street Band during the tour, he wanted his fifth album to be a "band" album, one that captured the feel of the band playing on stage. Springsteen stated: "I wanted to cut some music that felt very explosive. I wanted a record that combined the fun aspect of what the band did along with the story I was telling. Find a way to combine those things and create a bigger picture of what we did out in front of the people."

Rehearsals took place with the E Street Band during the early months of 1979 at a studio inside Springsteen's home in Holmdel, New Jersey. Springsteen wrote both new material and had an assortment of pre-written tracks either already recorded in the studio during the Darkness sessions or performed live on the tour, including "Independence Day", "Point Blank", "The Ties That Bind", "Ramrod", "Drive All Night", and "Sherry Darling". Springsteen used the Byrds as the basis for several songs, specifically their use of harmony vocals to unite the band as a whole. According to the author Peter Ames Carlin, the new material picked up where Darkness left off, being influenced by early rock and roll and country records, with stories capturing "snapshots of the real world as viewed through the hopes, labors, fears, joys, and strugglers of the unheralded many". Songs that took shape during this time included "Be True", "Hungry Heart", "I Wanna Be with You", "Bring on the Night", and "Roulette", which was written as a response to the Three Mile Island accident and foreshadowed Springsteen's future as a politicized singer-songwriter.

== Recording history ==
=== Initial sessions ===
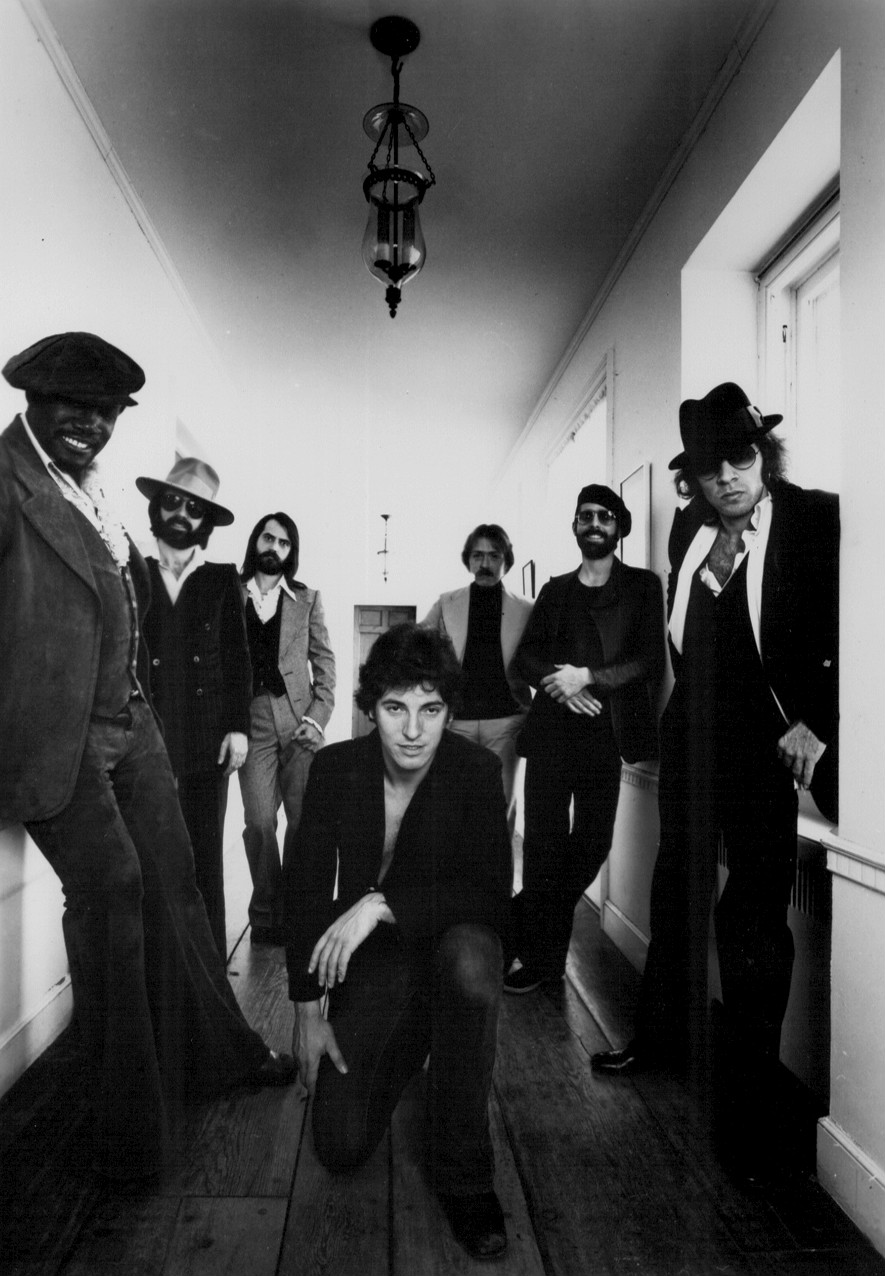
Springsteen (center, kneeling) and the E Street Band in February 1977

Recording sessions for the album began in March 1979 and took place at the Power Station in New York City. The venue was chosen after Weinberg, Tallent, and Bittan had recorded Ian Hunter's You're Never Alone with a Schizophrenic album there. Several different microphones were set up around the studio's large gymnasium-sized room designed to capture the live sounds of the band. Springsteen, Jon Landau, and Van Zandt acted as co-producers. Van Zandt exerted more control during these sessions after assisting with production during the Darkness sessions. He was tasked with giving the band a more "garage" and "rugged" sound to contrast with Born to Run (1975) and Darkness, and ensured the band was ready to play; Landau ensured progress was being made. Van Zandt later said: "The River was the first record where I felt comfortable enough to start capturing what the band was all about."

Springsteen's perfectionism from previous recording sessions remained, with the entire band recording numerous retakes of the same tracks. The Power Station's resident engineer Bob Clearmountain was taken aback by Springsteen's work ethic at first but was impressed by his material and dedication to achieving perfection. Songs were played based on the complexity of their chord structures. Springsteen taught the band the more complex ones in sections, while more simple ones began without the band knowing what they were playing entirely. Tallent remembered: "We'd hear the song for the first time while we were recording it." Tracks were mostly recorded live, apart from occasional vocal, guitar, or saxophone overdubs.

One of the first songs recorded was "The Ties That Bind". In May, the band attempted "Bring on the Night" and the Born to Run outtake "Janey Needs a Shooter", (Note: This recording of "Janey Needs a Shooter" appeared on the bootleg Son You May Kiss the Bride.) the latter of which Springsteen donated to Warren Zevon. (Note: Zevon's recording, titled "Jeannie Needs a Shooter", appeared on his 1980 album Bad Luck Streak in Dancing School.) Between May and mid-June, the band recorded "Sherry Darling", "Independence Day", "I Wanna Be With You", "Ramrod", "Bring on the Night", "Jackson Cage", "Be True", and "Hungry Heart", which Springsteen initially wrote for the Ramones, believing its poppy sound was out of place with the rest of the material, but Landau convinced him to keep it. Harmony vocals on the song were provided by Flo & Eddie (Howard Kaylan and Mark Volman, formerly of the Turtles). Anticipating a hit single, the mixer Chuck Plotkin sped the tape up to "give the vocal a more boyish lilt", after which Clearmountain mixed the song. Springsteen initially disliked the finished song before being convinced it fit on the album and would perform well as the lead single. In June, Springsteen attended the wedding of his lighting director Marc Brickman in Los Angeles, California, after which he wrote "Stolen Car" and other songs with marital and parental themes, including "The Price You Pay", "Loose Ends", "I Wanna Marry You", and "Cindy". Other songs, such as "You Can Look (But You Better Not Touch)" and "Ricky Wants a Man of Her Own", appeared by late July.

The sessions continued through August, during which Springsteen wrote "The River". By September, he had finalized a track list and was ready to release the album, to be titled The Ties That Bind, by Christmas 1979. (Note: The tracklist was as follows: Side one: "Cindy", "Hungry Heart", "Stolen Car", and "Be True". Side two: "The River", "You Can Look (But You Better Not Touch)", "The Price You Pay", "I Wanna Marry You", and "Loose Ends".) This version was engineered and mixed by Clearmountain. Nevertheless, Springsteen felt the album "wasn't enough" as he kept listening to it. (Note: Springsteen told Robert Hilburn shortly after The River's release that the single LP "wasn't personal enough", while he told Dave Marsh that the audience's response to the band's performance at the No Nukes concerts "made the [single] album seem inadequate". Springsteen wrote in his 2003 book Songs that The Ties That Bind "lacked the kind of unity and conceptual intensity I liked my music to have".) In his 2016 autobiography Born to Run, he explained that he was inspired by artists such as Van Morrison, Bob Dylan, and Marvin Gaye, who "created self-aware, self-contained worlds on their albums, and then invited their fans to discover them". After performing with the E Street Band at the No Nukes benefit concerts for Musicians United for Safe Energy at Madison Square Garden in mid-September, (Note: These shows appeared on a live album, No Nukes: The Muse Concerts for a Non-Nuclear Future, in November 1979, and an accompanying documentary, also called No Nukes, in May 1980. Springsteen's sets later appeared on The Legendary 1979 No Nukes Concerts live album and accompanying concert film in 2021.) Springsteen reconceptualized the album. He had debuted "The River" during the shows and wanted to write new material that reflected the song's darker themes.

=== Later sessions ===
I had an album of 13 songs finished a year ago September, but I didn't put the record out because it wasn't personal enough. This album seems much more personal to me.

— Bruce Springsteen on shelving The Ties That Bind, 1980

With The Ties That Bind scrapped, the recording sessions continued through the end of 1979 into 1980 as Springsteen kept writing new material, including "Crush on You", "Where All the Bands Are", "Party Lights", "I'm a Rocker", "Living on the Edge of the World", "Take 'em as They Come", "Out in the Street", and "Two Hearts". Discussing his long recording periods in the studio, Springsteen said: "I stopped feeling bad about ... spending a long time in the studio ... I said [to myself], That's me, that's what I do. I work slow, and I work slow for a reason: To get the results that I want." These sessions were engineered by Neil Dorfsman as Clearmountain departed for other commitments. (Note: Dorfsman ended up engineering all of The River aside from "Hungry Heart" and "The Ties That Bind", by Clearmountain, and "Drive All Night", by Born to Run and Darkness engineer Jimmy Iovine.)

Between January and April 1980, Springsteen continued writing new songs, such as "Restless Nights" and "Wreck on the Highway", and reintroduced already recorded material to re-record, including "Independence Day", "Point Blank", "Sherry Darling", "Drive All Night", "Stolen Car", and "Jackson Cage". Landau proposed making the record a double album to encompass everything Springsteen was trying to achieve. By the end of April, Springsteen had selected 22 tracks for the album, although recording continued. He later stated in the late 1990s: "It's never over until it's over. Everybody's telling you you're done and you take it home and it's just not right ... [But] my life at the time [of The River] was extremely focused, probably to the detriment of the records."

The sessions lasted until August 1980 for a total of 18 months, during which almost 50 songs were recorded. Of the outtakes, some were issued as B-sides ("Be True", "Held Up Without a Gun", and "Roulette"), while others later appeared on compilation albums such as 1998's Tracks ("Loose Ends" and "Ricky Wants a Man for Her Own") and 2015's The Ties That Bind: The River Collection ("Cindy" and "The Man Who Got Away"). Springsteen also gave songs to other artists, including "From Small Things (Big Things One Day Come)" to Dave Edmunds, who released his own version in 1982, as well as "Dedication" and "Your Love" to the singer Gary U.S. Bonds. Springsteen later admitted he left "an entire album ... [of] three [to] four-minute pop songs" in the vault.

=== Mixing ===
Mixing for the double album, now called The River, was done at Clover Studios in Los Angeles by Plotkin and Toby Scott. Reportedly lasting five months, mixing the 20 chosen recordings proved problematic; the studio's microphones used to record the live sound bled together, creating a "muddled and unclear" sound. Scott explained: "Neil [Dorfsman]'s recording of the room mics had been one of my problems when I mixed The River. There was so much cymbal in those room mics, I had to recreate the room by using the Clover studio and piping some of the drums back out over speakers into the studio to have them reverberate around, while also using reverb units." Plotkin and Scott attempted to make their own mix of "Hungry Heart" before deciding Clearmountain's mix was superior. Mastering was done by Ken Perry at Capitol Studios in Hollywood.

== Music and lyrics ==
After the unrelenting seriousness of Darkness, I wanted more flexibility in the emotional range of the songs I chose. Along with 'gravitas', our shows were always filled with fun, and I wanted to make sure, this time around, that didn't get lost.

— Bruce Springsteen, Born to Run, 2016

The River is a double album that contains 20 tracks. Its musical style has been characterized as heartland rock, rock and roll, R&B, folk, and country, with vocal hints at British punk rock and new wave. Kenneth Partridge of Billboard retrospectively described The River as Springsteen's "new wave album, but it's also his pop album". According to AllMusic's Mark Deming, the music was "leaner" and "more strongly rooted in rock & roll" than Born to Run and Darkness. Due to the nature in which the album was recorded, The River features a "garage band" and "live" sound throughout, which Springsteen said represented an effort "to provide fuel for our live show and to create a counterbalance to the ballads that began showing up more and more in my work". Carlin said the live performances give the songs a "barroom feel that trade the precision of 'Born to Run' and 'Darkness on the Edge of Town' with the power of the full band's instrumental wallop".

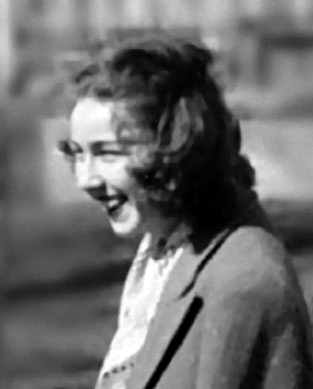
The writings of Flannery O'Connor (pictured in 1947) influenced Springsteen when writing the characterizations on The River.

Expanding on the themes of its two predecessors, The River's lyrics focus primarily on love, marriage, and family. Springsteen himself said the record "was my first attempt to write about the commitments of home and marriage." He was particularly influenced by the writer Flannery O'Connor for his characterizations, stating: "There was something in those stories of hers that I felt captured a certain part of the American character that I was interested in writing about." Paul Pearson of Treble stated that Springsteen stripped the storytelling of the album's two predecessors for in-depth character studies: "The characters on Born to Run and Darkness were ones everyone recognized. The characters on The River were ones we knew." The writers Larry David Smith and Jon Rutter split The River's songs into three storytelling styles: "frivolous" party songs ("Cadillac Ranch", "Ramrod"), songs detailing relationships ("The Ties that Bind", "Two Hearts", "I Wanna Marry You"), and "a systematic extension of Darkness themes via a series of life-is-hell songs" ("Independence Day", "The River", "The Price You Pay"). The album also deals with car themes extensively, particularly on sides three and four; on "Sherry Darling" and "Crush on You", the car represents "tedious responsibility" and "the arrival of lust", respectively. In his 2004 book Two Hearts, Dave Marsh summarized:

Springsteen's [double album] exists between two archetypes. Its first two sides are a chronicle of people awakening to the fact that they aren't young anymore, that their futures are no longer limitless... The last two sides, on the other hand, describe one version of how someone bred on rock and roll dreams comes to terms with the knowledge that he has aged.

=== Side one ===
The album opener, "The Ties That Bind", is an up-tempo track featuring saxophone. In it, the narrator addresses his heartbroken girlfriend who wants to live without thinking about other people. He challenges her not to forsake love but accept the ties of relationships. "Sherry Darling" is a "frat-rock" song with a live feel, featuring cheers and background singing. Based on 1960s songs like the Swingin' Medallions' "Double Shot of My Baby's Love" (1966), the lyrics are about a man who wants to be alone with his girlfriend in his car, but is stuck driving his rowdy mother-in-law to an unemployment agency. "Jackson Cage" is a rock and new wave song featuring organ. It is about a woman living a secluded life, which prevents her from achieving the American dream. Springsteen said of the song: "I never knew anybody who was unhappy with their job and was happy with their life. It's your sense of purpose. Now, some people can find it elsewhere. Some people can work a job and find it some place else."

"Two Hearts" is a garage rock song about searching for a lover and someone to help "whip this world" into a place worth living. "Independence Day" is a slow, introspective ballad featuring piano, acoustic guitar, and saxophone. A drama about a relationship between a father and son, the son has realized he and his father, despite their similarities, will never agree on anything, leaving him to declare his "independence" from his father and leave home. The song was inspired by Springsteen's relationship with his own father.

=== Side two ===
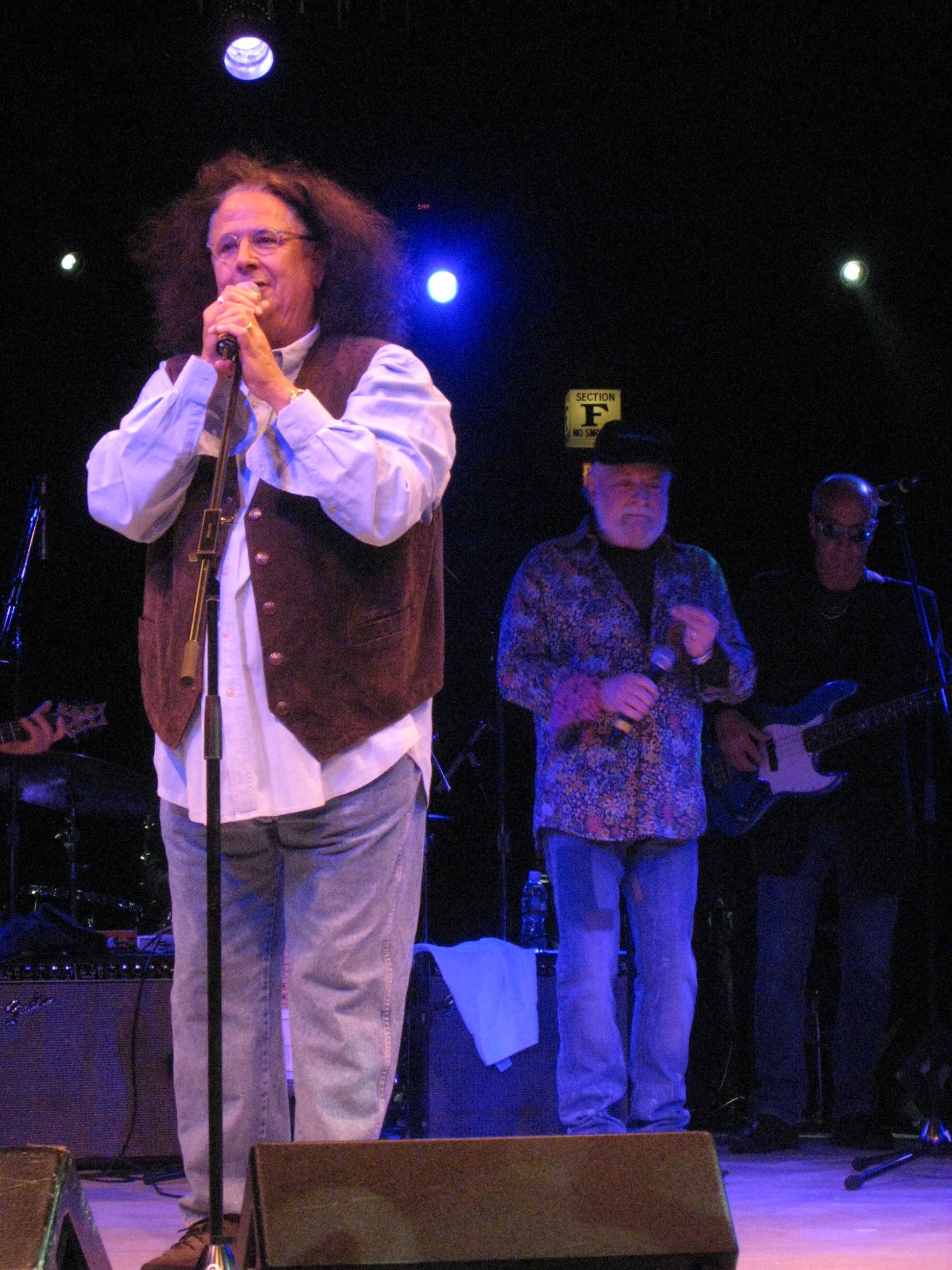
The duo Flo & Eddie (Mark Volman, left, and Howard Kaylan, right, in 2008) provided harmony vocals on "Hungry Heart".

Based on a piano riff from the Four Seasons' "Dawn (Go Away)" (1964), "Hungry Heart" is a pop rock song about a man who leaves his family. He reminisces about his relationship history, and by the song's end, he realizes he needs to return to a home life. Springsteen's vocals were sped up to sound more "boyish", while the duo Flo & Eddie provided harmony vocals. "Out in the Street" is a new wave and rock song led by piano. (Note: New wave; rock; led by piano.) Lyrically, it uses street parties as a getaway from the depressing, hard working life, with emphasis on asserting youthfulness. "Crush on You" is a Rolling Stones-esque dance song featuring slide guitar from Van Zandt. In the lyrics, the narrator sees the girl of his dreams and imagines what she is like, from her possible occupation as a waitress or a bank teller, to an heir to the Rockefeller family.

"You Can Look (But You Better Not Touch)" is a neo-rockabilly song compared by the authors Philippe Margotin and Jean-Michel Guesdon to the styles of Eddie Cochran and Duane Eddy. The song's subject is frustrated with commerce and his inability to express his sexual desires. Following a series of upbeat rock songs, "I Wanna Marry You" is a slower 1960s style pop ballad about romance. In it, a couple question their relationship responsibilities; the narrator promises to do the best for his girl. Margotin and Guesdon write that the song represents a return to the main theme throughout The River, that "only life as a couple allows you to overcome the misfortunes and failures of life".

The album's title track asks the album's central question: "Is a dream a lie if it [does not] come true, or is it something worse?" Inspired by the lives of Springsteen's own sister and brother-in-law, "The River" possesses themes of nostalgia and sadness, telling the story of a young man who has settled into life by his late teens, marrying his pregnant girlfriend, Mary, and getting a union construction job. The couple are bound to follow the same working class lives as their parents, as well as their grandparents. The song also describes the couple's unromantic courthouse wedding, the narrator losing his job due to the "economy", and the two's memories of swimming in a local watering hole referred to as "the river". The title has also been interpreted as a metaphor for the narrator's passions, which by the song's end has "gone dry". Musically inspired by "My Bucket's Got a Hole in It" (1949) by Hank Williams, "The River" is a mid-tempo folk and Americana ballad featuring harmonica.

=== Side three ===
"I'm a Rocker"
"I'm a Rocker" is one of The River's upbeat party songs. The authors Philippe Margotin and Jean-Michel Guesdon argued the song successfully captured Springsteen and the E Street Band's energy as a live act.

"Point Blank" is a downbeat, dark ballad with a melancholic atmosphere. It concerns a narrator telling the story of how the woman he loves is about to die, further describing past moments in their lives. "Cadillac Ranch" is a 1950s Chuck Berry-style rock song about the titular ranch located in Amarillo, Texas, with lyrically references to Junior Johnson, James Dean, and Burt Reynolds. "I'm a Rocker" is a humorous, playful, rockabilly-style rock song offering "an effective sideswipe at commercialism gone wrong", featuring cultural references to Batman, James Bond, Kojak, Columbo, Mission: Impossible, and more. Margotin and Guesdon write that tracks such as "I'm a Rocker" encapsulated the energy of the live songs, while others like "Point Blank" echoed the "austerity" of Darkness.

"Fade Away" is a pop-soul "retro ballad" wherein the narrator expresses his sadness after his ex-girlfriend falls in love with another man. The man's memories of her consumes him, as he does not want to disappear from her life. "Stolen Car" is a ballad with a "dense, dreamlike atmosphere" that describes a man being haunted by memories of an ended romance. Heartbroken, he turns to crime as he drives a stolen car through the night, causing the darkness as he has lost his love. Springsteen said of the track: "That song's character, drifting through the night, is the first to face the angels and devils that will drive him toward his love and keep him from ever reaching her." (Note: In his 2003 book Songs, Springsteen stated he explored more of the type of characters found on "Stolen Car" on his 1987 album Tunnel of Love.)

=== Side four ===
"Ramrod" is a rock and roll song that Partridge retrospectively compared to Springsteen's 1984 B-side "Pink Cadillac". The song's subject expresses passion for his car, a 1932 Ford with a Hemi engine and four gears. Carlin wrote that "the narrator has death on his mind, even as he pushes his automotive slang into the red zone of sexual metaphor." According to Margotin and Guesdon, the narrator is Springsteen himself reminiscing about his adolescence in New Jersey. "The Price You Pay" is a pop and rock ballad with musical and lyrics references to "The Promised Land" from Darkness. It is one of several tracks on the album that concern the human toll of economic and social inequality and contains a second-person proverb about facing the costs of life and love. In the song, the narrator recounts to a young woman on a beach the story of "the promised land", wherein the characters "crossed the desert sands" only to be turned away and "to face the price you pay".

"Wreck on the Highway"
"Wreck on the Highway" is one of The River's slow, introspection ballads. The song, which describes a man witnessing a car accident on a highway, foreshadowed the lyrics and themes of Springsteen's next album, Nebraska (1982).

"Drive All Night" is a slower song driven by "dark romanticism", featuring piano, organ, and saxophone. The song concerns a narrator who has lost his true love. He describes the pain he feels as he drives through the night, eventually urging his lost love to return to him, despite their relational problems, and fully embrace each other. "Wreck on the Highway" is a country-style ballad that took inspiration from the 1930s Roy Acuff country song of the same name. Taking place on a rainy night, the song concerns a man witnessing a car accident on the highway during his drive home from work. As an ambulance arrives to take the injured driver away, the narrator's emotions consume him as he thinks about the victim's significant other and her pain when she learns of the accident. Partridge said the song unifies the entire album by containing bouts of humor mixed with moments of sadness, representing "the randomness of the world". Springsteen said "Wreck on the Highway", as the album's final track, symbolized the closing of the highway: "It's a recognition of mortality."

== Packaging and artwork ==
The cover art of The River is a black-and-white close-up photograph of Springsteen taken by Frank Stefanko, who previously took the cover photograph for Darkness. According to Stefanko, the image was an outtake from the Darkness photo sessions, chosen by Springsteen while mixing The River. Springsteen wanted The River's cover photo to be "sober and serious". In it, he appears unshaven, dons a plaid shirt, and is looking into the camera. The authors Philippe Margotin and Jean-Michel Guesdon argue that the image signifies that The River is a record "from the American heartland of the countryside and small towns" and "an album recorded by blue-collar musicians". Springsteen's name and the album title are colored blue against a black background. The cover was designed by Jimmy Wachtel.

The album's back cover features various images, including five brides and a groom, a stack of paper cups, a bald eagle, and an American flag. On the album's original release, Robert Palmer of The New York Times argued that the back cover contributes to the album's "thematic thrust". The inside of the sleeve features photographs of Springsteen and the E Street Band and the lyrics of the 20 songs.

== Release and promotion ==
The River was released through Columbia Records on October 17, 1980. The album was a commercial success, becoming Springsteen's first album to reach number one on the Billboard Top LPs & Tape chart. It also became his fastest-selling album yet, selling 1.6 million copies in the US by Christmas 1980. The album was also a success elsewhere, topping the charts in Canada and Norway, and reached number two in the Netherlands, Sweden, and the UK, three in France, five in Spain, and eight in Australia. It also reached number 28 in Japan, 31 in Germany, and 36 in Switzerland. The River has since been certified quintuple platinum by the Recording Industry Association of America (RIAA) in the US, making it one of Springsteen's best-selling albums, and his highest certified studio release after Born in the U.S.A. (1984) and Born to Run.

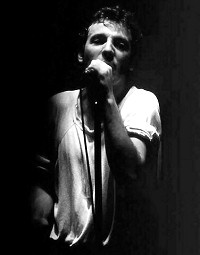
Springsteen performing in Norway on The River Tour in 1981.

"Hungry Heart" was released four days after the album on October 21, 1980, as the first single from The River, with "Held Up Without a Gun" as the B-side. It became Springsteen's first Billboard Hot 100 top ten hit single, reaching number five, eventually selling five million copies. In the UK, it reached number 44. "Fade Away" appeared as the second single in North America, Australia, and New Zealand on January 22, 1981, with "Be True" as the B-side. It reached number 20 in the US. "Sherry Darling", backed by "Be True", appeared in February, followed by "The River", backed by "Independence Day", in April in Europe and Australia only. It hit number 35 in the UK. "The River" was also nominated for Best Rock Vocal Performance at the 24th Annual Grammy Awards in 1982. "Cadillac Ranch", backed by "Wreck on the Highway", appeared as the next single in August 1981 in the UK only. Additional singles released in 1981 included "I Wanna Marry You", backed by "Be True", in Japan only, and "Point Blank", backed by "Ramrod", in the UK only.

Springsteen and the E Street Band supported The River on the River Tour, which ran 140 shows. The North American leg ran from October 3, 1980, to March 5, 1981. The band performed songs across Springsteen's career, as well as outtakes and numerous one-off covers, although Springsteen typically focused on The River's material. When asked by interviewers about the focus on new material, Springsteen said he wanted to play the new songs live and "[had] very little to do anymore with my first two, even three LPs". The shows themselves featured upwards of thirty songs and lasted over three hours in length. During a filmed show in Tempe, Arizona, in early November, Springsteen, who had remained politically conscious up to that point, made a rare political statement about the election of Ronald Reagan that occurred the day before. He later said his first trip to Europe led him to "step out of the United States and look back with a critical eye". Soon after, Springsteen began performing covers of songs that added social commentary to the shows, such as Woody Guthrie's "This Land Is Your Land" (1945) and Creedence Clearwater Revival's "Who'll Stop the Rain" (1970). A European tour ran from April to June 1981, followed by a final American leg from July to September, which opened with six sold-out shows at the Brendan Byrne Arena in East Rutherford, New Jersey.

== Critical reception ==
Professional ratings
Initial reviews
Review scores
Source	Rating
Christgau's Record Guide	A−
Record Mirror	5/5 stars
Smash Hits	9½/10
Sounds	5/5 stars

The River was greeted with the widest range of critical reviews of Springsteen's career up to that point. Among positive reviews, the album was hailed as his best work to date, one of the year's best records, and a "rock & roll milestone", offering "a full, panoramic screen of rock at its most glorious and passionate". It was described as a summary and extension of Springsteen's records up to that point, creating an album that encapsulates what Springsteen is about. In the Los Angeles Times, Steve Pond said The River has as strong a "cumulative impact" as Born to Run, and commended the record for successfully capturing the "gut-level punch and immediacy" of Springsteen's live performances.

Several critics highlighted the expanded lyrical themes from previous albums. Stephen Holden referred to The River as "Springsteen's dictionary, encyclopedia, and bible of rock and roll", arguing that its "lighter moments" give it the edge over Springsteen's earlier albums. Rolling Stone's Paul Nelson said the record possesses "weighty conclusions, words to live by" regarding "the second acts of American lives", conclusions "filled with an uncommon common sense and intelligence that could only have come from an exceptionally warmhearted but wary graduate of the street of hard knocks". In Melody Maker, Paolo Hewitt compared listening to The River to "taking a trip through the rock 'n' roll heartland as you've never experienced it". Springsteen's vocal performances and the musical performances of the E Street Band were also praised; High Fidelity's Sam Sutherland said the album "captur[es] both the skeletal power and impressionistic delicacy [the E Street] members have mastered in their years together".

More negatively, some believed Springsteen was recycling old material and had lost his "creative edge". In The New York Times, Robert Palmer said the album could have used trimming due to most of the tracks having similar tones and details throughout, on top of featuring similar themes and styles as Born to Run and Darkness. Writing for Trouser Press, Ira Robbins ridiculed the album for having repetitive lyrical themes, a "party atmosphere", poor vocals and "flawed" lyrics, equating to a "water-treading exercise" record that "neither upholds his standards of excellence nor explores any new avenues". In a very negative review for NME, Julie Burchill said The River is "great music for people who've wasted their youth to sit around drinking beer and [are] wasting the rest of their lives too". (Note: According to NME's Nick Kent, Burchill's negative review led to the cancellation of a planned interview between Springsteen and the publication, as well as NME having zero access to Springsteen during the European leg of The River Tour.)

Rolling Stone ranked The River the year's best album, Springsteen the best artist and singer, and "Hungry Heart" the best single. It was also voted the second-best album of 1980 in The Village Voice's annual Pazz & Jop poll, behind the Clash's London Calling. In an accompanying essay, the poll's supervisor Robert Christgau wrote: "All the standard objections apply—his beat is still clunky, his singing overwrought...but his writing is at a peak, and he's grown into a bitter empathy. These are the wages of young romantic love among those who get paid by the hour." Despite NME's negative review, the publication ranked The River the 12th best album of the year in their end-of-year list.

== Legacy ==
In the context of Springsteen's career, The River was a stepping stone between Darkness on the Edge of Town and Nebraska, a minimalist, folk-inspired solo effort released in September 1982. Springsteen recorded the songs as demo recordings at his newly rented home in Colts Neck, New Jersey, between December 1981 and January 1982, intending to re-record them with the E Street Band, but after poor test sessions he decided to release the recordings as is. The album chronicled dark hardships felt by everyday blue-collar workers, as well as bleak tales of criminals, law enforcement officers, and gang wars. Several songs on The River foreshadowed the direction Springsteen took for Nebraska, including "Stolen Car", "The River", and "Wreck On the Highway". The River also influenced the writing of Springsteen's 1987 album Tunnel of Love.

According to Margotin and Guesdon, The River, as a trilogy with Born to Run and Darkness on the Edge of Town, elevated Springsteen as a seminal chronicler of 1970s America, as Bob Dylan had done in the 1960s with Bringing It All Back Home (1965), Highway 61 Revisited (1965), and Blonde on Blonde (1966). The authors call The River an essential Springsteen record and one that is as revered as other double albums such as Blonde on Blonde, the Beatles' The Beatles (1968), the Rolling Stones' Exile on Main St. (1972), and Stevie Wonder's Songs in the Key of Life (1976). In 1987, The New York Times's Jon Pareles cited The River as the beginning of 1980s heartland rock.

=== Retrospective reviews ===
Professional ratings
Retrospective reviews
Review scores
Source	Rating
AllMusic	5/5 stars
Chicago Tribune	3.5/4 stars
The Encyclopedia of Popular Music	4/5 stars
MusicHound Rock	5/5
New Musical Express	7/10
The New Rolling Stone Album Guide (2004)	4/5 stars
Q	5/5 stars
Tom Hull – on the Web	A−

In later decades, commentators consider The River one of Springsteen's finest works. (Note: Attributed to multiple references:) Critics have praised the album's track sequencing, Springsteen's songwriting, and growing maturity. Mark Guarino of The Guardian wrote that although the album examines themes Springsteen had touched on before and since its release, The River is unique in that "it takes its time to explore the highs and lows of growing pains, as adolescence wrestles its way into adulthood". Grantland's Steven Hyden said that, despite being overshadowed by the records that surround it in Springsteen's discography, The River is "the most representative of his entire body of work". Critics have also praised the performances of the E Street Band, and the contributions of Van Zandt. Several agreed the album successfully captured the band's force as a live act.

Most critics remain divided on The River's consistency, (Note: Attributed to multiple references:) with several agreeing that it feels like two separate albums. Writing for AllMusic, Mark Deming found the first half stronger than the second, which contains songs that work well as standalone tracks rather than a cohesive whole. Billboard's Kenneth Partridge argued that the album would have been "more consistent" as a single LP, but as it stands, The River is "a summation of everywhere [Springsteen] had been and an indication he wasn't content to spin his wheels". Other critics described the album as "sprawling" and noted the presence of filler songs, although Dave Lifton of Ultimate Classic Rock argued the record's length "works to its advantage" as the combination of "fluff" and "more thoughtful" material "helps define Springsteen's ultimate philosophy: The world can be cold and unfair, but that doesn’t mean you can't let loose and dance through it." Stephen Thomas Erlewine also felt the "throwaways" gave the LP "cinematic scope", while Gillian G. Gaar stated the "mixture of joy and pain" gave The River "its richness and depth".

=== Rankings ===
The River has appeared on best-of lists. In 2003, Rolling Stone ranked it at number 250 on their list of the 500 greatest albums of all time, then was re-ranked at number 253 in the 2012 revised list. The following year, NME ranked it at number 484 in a similar list. In 2020 lists compiling the best albums of 1980, Paste placed it at number two, behind Talking Heads' Remain in Light, while Rolling Stone put it at number eight. Paste also ranked The River the 29th best album of the 1980s in 2012. The album also appeared in a list of the 100 best rock albums of the 1980s by Ultimate Classic Rock in 2015.

== Reissues ==
Professional ratings
The Ties That Bind: The River Collection
Aggregate scores
Source	Rating
Metacritic	91/100
Review scores
Source	Rating
AllMusic	5/5 stars
Paste	8.0/10
Pitchfork	8.7/10
Rolling Stone	4.5/5 stars

The River was first released on CD in 1988. This was followed by additional CD reissues by Sony BMG in 2003 and 2008. On December 4, 2015, The River was reissued as an expanded box set in celebration of the album's 35th anniversary. Titled The Ties That Bind: The River Collection, the set includes four CDs, three DVDs, and a coffee table book. The first two CDs feature a newly remastered version of The River and the third contains the previously unreleased The Ties That Bind single LP. The fourth CD collects 22 outtakes from The River sessions, including 12 previously unreleased ones and ones that had appeared on Tracks in 1998 and the bonus disc of The Essential Bruce Springsteen in 2003. Some previously released songs, including "Stolen Car" and "You Can Look (But You Better Not Touch)", appeared in different versions. The DVDs feature a documentary on the album's making, as well as a concert film of Springsteen and the E Street Band performing in Tempe, Arizona, during the River Tour in 1980. The Ties That Bind was critically acclaimed.

To celebrate the release of The Ties That Bind and The River's 35th anniversary, Springsteen and the E Street Band embarked on the River Tour from January 2016 to February 2017, performing in North America, Europe, and Oceania. Many of the shows featured The River performed in its entirety, and other songs from Springsteen's career.

== Track listing ==
All tracks are written by Bruce Springsteen.

Side one
No.	Title	Length
1.	"The Ties That Bind"	3:33
2.	"Sherry Darling"	4:02
3.	"Jackson Cage"	3:04
4.	"Two Hearts"	2:42
5.	"Independence Day"	4:46
Total length:		18:07

Side two
No.	Title	Length
1.	"Hungry Heart"	3:19
2.	"Out in the Street"	4:17
3.	"Crush on You"	3:10
4.	"You Can Look (But You Better Not Touch)"	2:36
5.	"I Wanna Marry You"	3:26
6.	"The River"	4:59
Total length:		21:47

Side three
No.	Title	Length
1.	"Point Blank"	6:05
2.	"Cadillac Ranch"	3:02
3.	"I'm a Rocker"	3:34
4.	"Fade Away"	4:40
5.	"Stolen Car"	3:53
Total length:		21:14

Side four
No.	Title	Length
1.	"Ramrod"	4:04
2.	"The Price You Pay"	5:27
3.	"Drive All Night"	8:26
4.	"Wreck on the Highway"	3:53
Total length:		21:50 82:58

== Personnel ==
Credits adapted from the album's liner notes, except where noted:

- Bruce Springsteen – vocals, electric 6- and 12-string guitars, harmonica, piano on "Drive All Night"

The E Street Band

- Roy Bittan – piano, organ on "I'm a Rocker" and "Drive All Night", background vocals
- Clarence Clemons – saxophone, percussion, background vocals
- Danny Federici – organ; glockenspiel on "Hungry Heart"
- Garry Tallent – bass guitar
- Steve Van Zandt – acoustic and electric guitars, lead guitar on "Crush on You", harmony vocals, background vocals
- Max Weinberg – drums

Additional vocals

- Flo & Eddie (Howard Kaylan and Mark Volman) – background vocals on "Hungry Heart"

Technical

- Bruce Springsteen, Jon Landau, Steven Van Zandt – production
- Neil Dorfsman – engineer
- Chuck Plotkin, Toby Scott – mixing
- Jeff Hendrickson, Garry Rindfuss, Dana Bisbee, Raymond Willhard, James Farber – engineering assistants
- Jim Bauerlein – digital operator
- Ken Perry – mastering
- Jimmy Iovine – engineer on "Drive All Night"
- Bob Clearmountain – engineer on "The Ties That Bind", mixing on "Hungry Heart"
- Jimmy Wachtel – art direction and design, photography
- Frank Stefanko – cover photography, other photography
- Joel Bernstein, Amanda Flick, David Gahr, Barry Goldenberg – photography

== Charts ==
=== Weekly charts ===
1980–81 weekly charts for The River
Chart (1980–81)	Peak position
Australian Albums (Kent Music Report)	8
Canada Top Albums/CDs (RPM)	1
Dutch Albums (Album Top 100)	2
French Albums (SNEP)	3
German Albums (Offizielle Top 100)	31
Japanese Oricon LPs Chart	28
New Zealand Albums (RMNZ)	2
Norwegian Albums (VG-lista)	1
Spanish Albums (PROMUSICAE)	5
Swedish Albums (Sverigetopplistan)	2
Swiss Albums (Schweizer Hitparade)	36
UK Albums (Official Charts)	2
US Billboard Top LPs & Tape	1

2015–16 weekly charts for The River
Chart (2015–16)	Peak position
Australian Albums (ARIA)	40
Spanish Albums (Promusicae)	68

=== Year-end charts ===
1980 year-end charts for The River
Chart (1980)	Position
Australian Albums (Kent Music Report)	63
Canadian Albums (RPM)	40
Dutch Albums Chart	100
French Albums Chart	4
UK Albums Chart	57

1981 year-end charts for The River
Chart (1981)	Position
Canadian Albums (RPM)	24
Dutch Albums Chart	27
UK Albums Chart	45
US Billboard Year-End	10

1985 year-end charts for The River
Chart (1985)	Position
New Zealand Albums (RMNZ)	35

== Certifications ==
Sales and certifications for The River
Region	Certification	Certified units/sales
Australia (ARIA)	3× Platinum	210,000^{^}
Canada (Music Canada)	2× Platinum	200,000^{^}
Denmark (IFPI Danmark)	Gold	10,000^{‡}
Finland (Musiikkituottajat)	Gold	25,000
France (SNEP)	2× Gold	200,000^{*}
Germany (BVMI)	Gold	250,000^{^}
Italy (FIMI) sales since 2009	Gold	25,000^{‡}
Netherlands (NVPI)	Gold	50,000^{^}
New Zealand (RMNZ)	Gold	7,500^{‡}
Sweden (GLF)	Gold	50,000
United Kingdom (BPI)	Platinum	300,000^{^}
United States (RIAA)	5× Platinum	5,000,000^{^}
^{*} Sales figures based on certification alone.^{^} Shipments figures based on certification alone.^{‡} Sales+streaming figures based on certification alone.
