= Scottrade Center, St. Louis, MO, 8/23/08 =

Live album by Bruce Springsteen and the E Street Band
- Released: April 14, 2017
- Recorded: August 23, 2008
- Venue: Scottrade Center, St. Louis, MO
- Genre: Rock
- Producer: John Cooper

Bruce Springsteen and the E Street Band chronology
HSBC Arena, Buffalo, NY, 11/22/09 (2016)	Scottrade Center, St. Louis, MO, 8/23/08 (2017)	Olympiastadion, Helsinki, July 31, 2012 (2017)

Scottrade Center, St. Louis, MO, 8/23/08 is a live album by Bruce Springsteen and the E Street Band, released on April 14, 2017. It is the twelfth official release through the Bruce Springsteen Archives. The show was originally recorded live at the Scottrade Center in St. Louis, MO on August 23, 2008, during the Magic Tour.

== Background ==
"On the 2007-08 Magic tour, fans began bringing song-request signs. Bruce seemed to revel in the challenge, while the suggestions also appeared to inspire him to resurrect songs he hadn’t played in decades. There’s no finer show to capture this fan-artist dynamic than this outstanding performance in St. Louis on 8/23/2008 including The Crystals’ "Then She Kissed Me" and Chuck Berry's "Little Queenie".

== Track listing ==
All songs by Bruce Springsteen, except where noted.

=== Set one ===
1. "Then She Kissed Me" – 4:53
  - written by Phil Spector, Ellie Greenwich and Jeff Barry and originally recorded by The Crystals
2. "Radio Nowhere" – 3:53
3. "Out in the Street" – 5:55
4. "Adam Raised a Cain" – 5:22
5. "Spirit in the Night" – 8:05
6. "Rendezvous" – 6:08
7. "For You" – 7:09
8. "Mountain of Love" – 4:34
  - written and originally recorded by Harold Dorman
9. "Backstreets" – 7:31
10. "Gypsy Biker" – 6:39
11. "Because the Night" – 6:17
12. "She's the One" – 6:13
13. "Livin' in the Future" – 6:25
14. "Cover Me" – 4:44
15. "Mary's Place" – 15:12
16. "Drive All Night" – 9:27
17. "The Rising" – 5:06
18. "Last to Die" – 4:26
19. "Long Walk Home" – 6:29
20. "Badlands" – 10:37
21. "Girls in Their Summer Clothes" – 5:28
22. "Jungleland" – 11:03
23. "Detroit Medley" – 4:52
  - written by Mitch Ryder originally recorded by Mitch Ryder and the Detroit Wheels
24. "Born to Run" - 5:39
25. "Dancing in the Dark" – 6:02
26. "American Land" – 9:30
27. "Thunder Road" – 6:10
28. "Little Queenie" – 7:39
  - written and originally recorded by Chuck Berry
29. "Twist and Shout" – 4:07
  - written by Phil Medley and Bert Berns and originally recorded by The Top Notes

== Personnel ==
The E Street Band

- Bruce Springsteen – lead vocals, electric guitar, acoustic guitar, harmonica
- Roy Bittan – piano, electric keyboard
- Clarence Clemons – saxophone, percussion, background vocals
- Nils Lofgren – electric guitar, acoustic guitar, pedal steel guitar, background vocals
- Garry Tallent – bass guitar
- Steven Van Zandt – electric guitar, mandolin, background vocals
- Max Weinberg – drums,

Additional musicians

- Charlie Giordano – organ, electric keyboards
- Soozie Tyrell – violin, acoustic guitar, background vocals
