= HSBC Arena, Buffalo, NY, 11/22/09 =

Live album by Bruce Springsteen and the E Street Band
- Released: December 23, 2016
- Recorded: November 22, 2009
- Venue: HSBC Arena, Buffalo, New York
- Genre: Rock
- Producer: John Cooper

Bruce Springsteen and the E Street Band chronology
| Chapter and Verse (2016) | HSBC Arena, Buffalo, NY, 11/22/09 (2016) | Scottrade Center, St. Louis, MO, 8/23/08 (2017) |

HSBC Arena, Buffalo, NY, 11/22/09 is a live album by Bruce Springsteen and the E Street Band, released in November 2016. It is the eleventh official release through the Bruce Springsteen Archives. The show was originally recorded live at the HSBC Arena in Buffalo, New York on November 22, 2009. It includes a complete performance of Springsteen's debut album, Greetings From Asbury Park, N.J. along with several other rarities. The show was the last to feature Clarence Clemons before his 2011 death and also was the last date on the Working on a Dream Tour.

== Track listing ==
All songs by Bruce Springsteen, except where noted.

=== Set one ===
1. "Wrecking Ball" – 6:23
2. "The Ties That Bind" – 3:40
3. "Hungry Heart" – 4:42
4. "Working on a Dream" – 9:12
5. "Blinded By the Light" – 5:32
6. "Growin' Up" – 7:42
7. "Mary Queen of Arkansas" – 4:30
8. "Does This Bus Stop at 82nd Street?" – 3:50
9. "Lost in the Flood" – 8:17
10. "The Angel" – 3:38
11. "For You" – 5:15
12. "Spirit in the Night" – 7:48
13. "It's Hard to Be a Saint in the City" – 5:15
14. "Waitin' on a Sunny Day" – 6:26
15. "The Promised Land" – 7:00
16. "Restless Nights" – 4:34
17. "Happy Birthday" – 1:03
18. "Surprise, Surprise" – 3:51
19. "Green Onions" – 4:34
  - written and originally recorded by Booker T. & the M.G.'s
20. "Merry Christmas, Baby" – 6:22
  - written by Lou Baxter and Johnny Moore and originally recorded by Johnny Moore's Three Blazers
21. "Santa Claus is Coming to Town" – 7:38
  - written by John Frederick Coots and Haven Gillespie
22. "(I Don't Want To) Hang Up My Rock and Roll Shoes" – 3:56
  - originally recorded by Chuck Willis
23. "Boom Boom" – 4:22
  - written and originally recorded by John Lee Hooker
24. "My Love Will Not Let You Down" – 5:05
25. "Long Walk Home" – 6:53
26. "The Rising" – 4:52
27. "Born to Run" – 5:53
28. "Tenth Avenue Freeze-Out" – 7:25

=== Encore ===
1. "I'll Work For Your Love" – 3:53
2. "Thunder Road" – 6:10
3. "American Land" – 8:35
4. "Dancing in the Dark" – 8:03
5. "Rosalita (Come Out Tonight)" – 8:04
6. "(Your Love Keeps Lifting Me) Higher and Higher" – 8:59
  - written by Gary Jackson and Carl Smith and originally recorded by Jackie Wilson
7. "Rockin' All Over the World" – 6:44
  - written and originally recorded by John Fogerty

== Personnel ==
=== The E Street Band ===
- Bruce Springsteen – lead vocals, electric guitar, acoustic guitar, harmonica
- Roy Bittan – piano, electric keyboard
- Clarence Clemons – saxophone, percussion, background vocals
- Nils Lofgren – electric guitar, acoustic guitar, pedal steel guitar, background vocals
- Garry Tallent – bass guitar
- Steven Van Zandt – electric guitar, mandolin, background vocals
- Max Weinberg – drums

and

- Charlie Giordano – organ, electric keyboards
- Soozie Tyrell – violin, acoustic guitar, percussion, background vocals

with

- Curtis King – background vocals, tambourine
- Cindy Mizelle – background vocals, tambourine
- Curt Ramm – trumpet
