= Magic Tour (Bruce Springsteen) =

2007–08 concert tour by Bruce Springsteen and the E Street Band

- Tour by Bruce Springsteen and the E Street Band
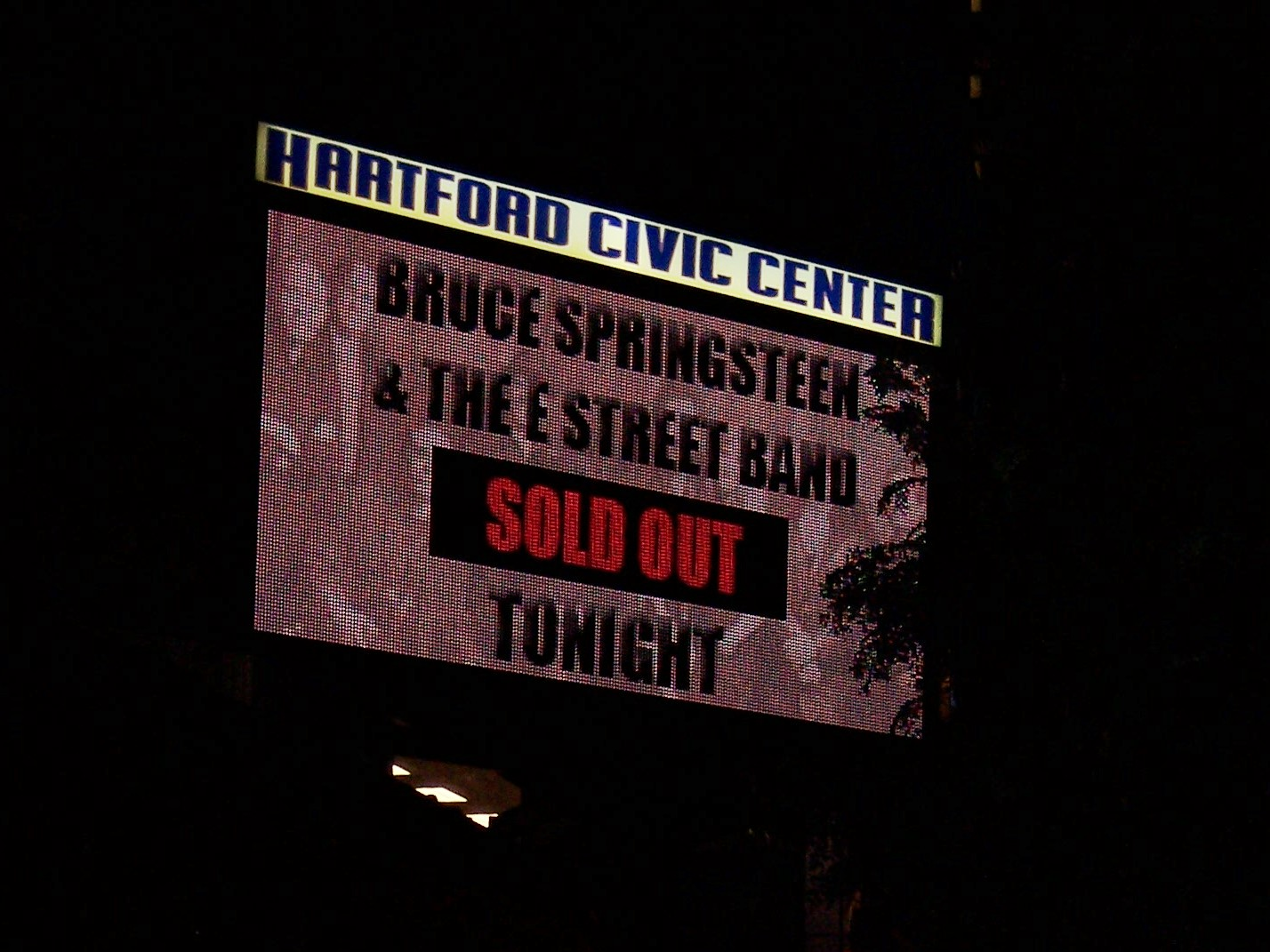
- Location: North America; Western Europe
- Associated album: Magic
- Start date: October 2, 2007
- End date: August 30, 2008
- Legs: 5
- No. of shows: 100
- Box office: US $235 million ($351.41 in 2025 dollars)

Bruce Springsteen and the E Street Band concert chronology
- Seeger Sessions Band Tour (2006); Magic Tour (2007–08); Working on a Dream Tour (2009)

The Magic Tour was Bruce Springsteen and the E Street Band's 2007–08 concert tour of North America and Western Europe.

The tour began October 2, 2007, in Hartford, Connecticut, and concluded August 30, 2008, in Milwaukee, Wisconsin. This was his first tour with the E Street Band since 2004's Vote for Change shows and the first prolonged outing with them since the 2002–2003 Rising Tour.

After the conclusion of the tour's first leg on November 19, 2007, organist Danny Federici took a leave of absence from the tour to pursue treatment for melanoma. He was replaced by Charles Giordano, who had played with Springsteen on the 2006 Sessions Band Tour. Federici made his only return to the stage on March 20, 2008, during the tour's third leg, when he appeared for portions of a show in Indianapolis. He died on April 17, 2008; the next two shows of the tour were postponed.

The Magic Tour was one of the biggest tours of the year and won the 2008 Billboard Touring Awards for Top Tour, Top Draw, and Top Manager (for Jon Landau). The Magic Tour had the second-highest gross worldwide for 2008 in Billboard's rankings, with $204.5 million and trailing only Bon Jovi's Lost Highway Tour. In Pollstar's calculus for North America, the Magic Tour had the sixth-highest gross for 2008 at $69.3 million. In any case, in total over its two years, the Magic Tour grossed more than $235 million.

== Itinerary ==
On August 28, 2007, it was announced on Bruce Springsteen's website that there would be a tour with the E Street Band immediately concurrent with the release of his album Magic. The two first-announced legs followed the practice established during the 2002–2003 Rising Tour, of quickly visiting cities in North America followed by the same in Western Europe. Possible lengthier engagements, or dates in areas outside the Northeastern United States, where Springsteen's commercial appeal had dimmed, were viewed as additional legs in 2008.

In an interview at the time of the tour's announcement, Springsteen made clear that this outing would be a return to expectations after the substantial stylistic departures of the solo, multi-instrumental 2005 Devils & Dust Tour and the big folk 2006 Sessions Band Tour: "Yeah — I'll be playing the rock music this time." Magic selections would be likely heavily featured, as they were written for playing in concert. And he shot down fan speculation that (with band members getting on in age and health and drummer Max Weinberg likely heading to Los Angeles when Conan O'Brien would take over The Tonight Show in 2009) this might be a farewell tour – "I envision the band carrying on for many, many, many more years. There ain't gonna be any farewell tour.... I'll never do that, man — you're only gonna know that when you don't see me no more" – as did band members the following year.

As per past Springsteen practice, the tour proper was preceded by a couple of weeks of the band holding closed rehearsals at Asbury Park Convention Hall – but now with loudspeakers playing local radio stations positioned outside the hall to foil the Springsteen faithful who gathered outside the building to hear a glimpse of the set lists and arrangements to come. This was followed by two rehearsal shows (which doubled as charity benefits) at Convention Hall on September 24 and 25, an early morning appearance on The Today Show's concert series on Rockefeller Plaza on September 28, and another, small-audience rehearsal at Continental Airlines Arena that night.

The first, North American leg began at the Hartford Civic Center on October 2, 2007, and played in arenas through two shows at the TD Banknorth Garden in Boston, concluding on November 19. The second, European leg began on November 25 at the Palacio de Deportes de la Comunidad de Madrid and finished at The O2 in London on December 19. As customary on some other Springsteen tours, a two-month winter holiday break was then taken.

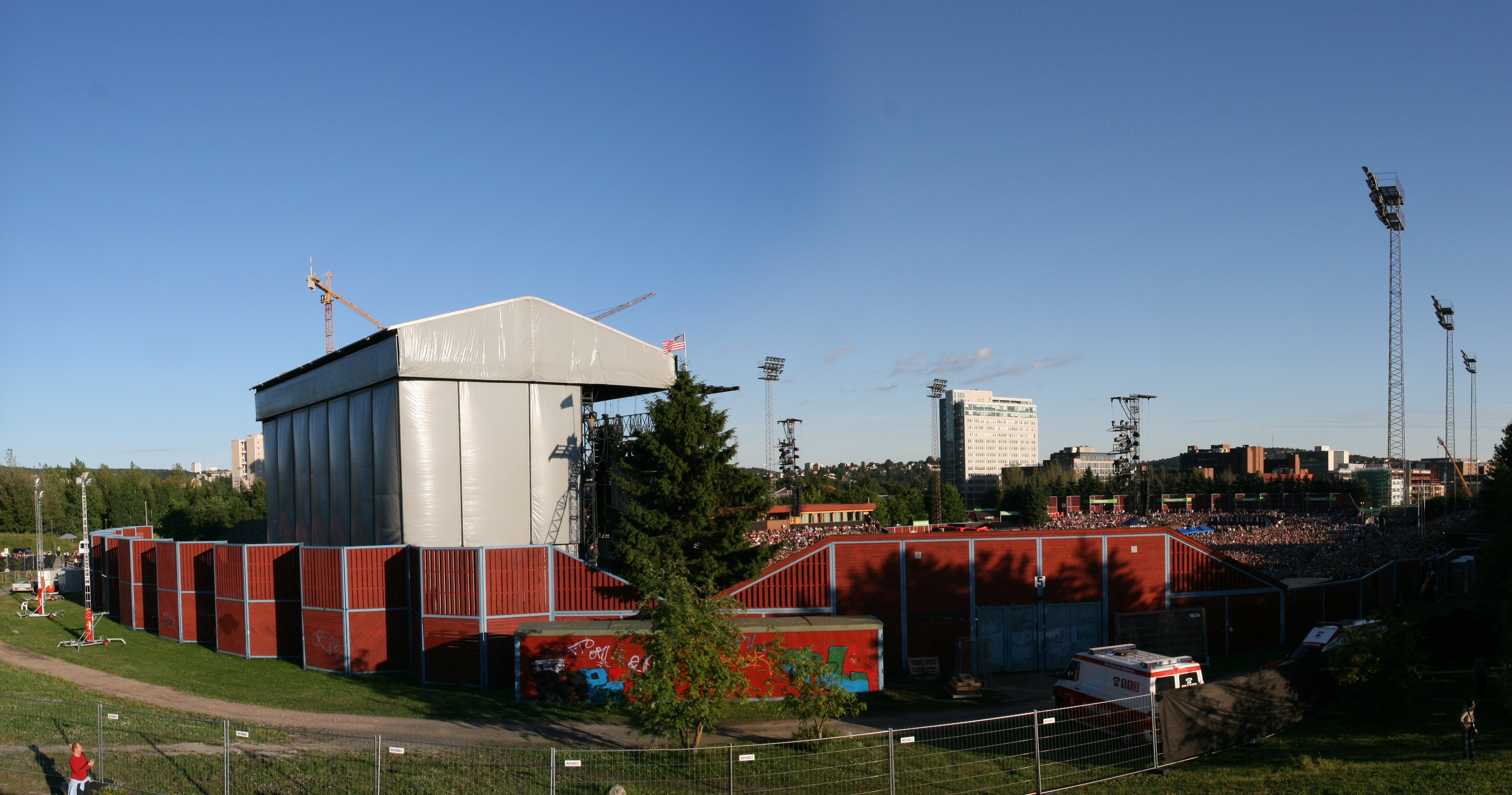
The scene outside a fourth-leg show at Oslo's Valle Hovin, July 8, 2008

The third, North American leg again started up at the Hartford Civic Center on February 28, 2008, playing both previously visited and unvisited markets, in arenas. It concluded on May 2, 2008, at BankAtlantic Center in Fort Lauderdale, Florida. (The leg's conclusion was followed by a special out-of-tour, very-high-priced benefit show May 7 for, and at, the Count Basie Theatre in Red Bank, New Jersey, where Springsteen's classic 1970s albums Darkness on the Edge of Town and Born to Run were played in sequence in their entirety.) Meanwhile, both arenas and stadiums were scheduled for a fourth, European leg to take place in mid-May through mid-July 2008, beginning at the RDS Arena in Dublin.

The fifth and final leg of the tour would return to North America for a few stadium and mostly arena or smaller outdoor venue shows, starting at Giants Stadium in New Jersey and visiting such places as Hershey, Pennsylvania, Richmond, Virginia, Nashville, Tennessee, and the like. The tour officially marked its end at the Harley-Davidson 105th Anniversary Celebration in Milwaukee on August 30, 2008, which Rolling Stone viewed as "a very odd way to end an epic tour."

A more extensive final leg, running into the autumn, was "in the works" but scrapped in mid-June 2008. Fans, however, still hoped for something after the Harley show, and were rewarded when plans were announced for Springsteen and the E Street Band to play the halftime show at Super Bowl XLIII, with strong speculation extending to a new album in early 2009 and a tour run before Max Weinberg went to California for The Tonight Show with Conan O'Brien.

== The show ==
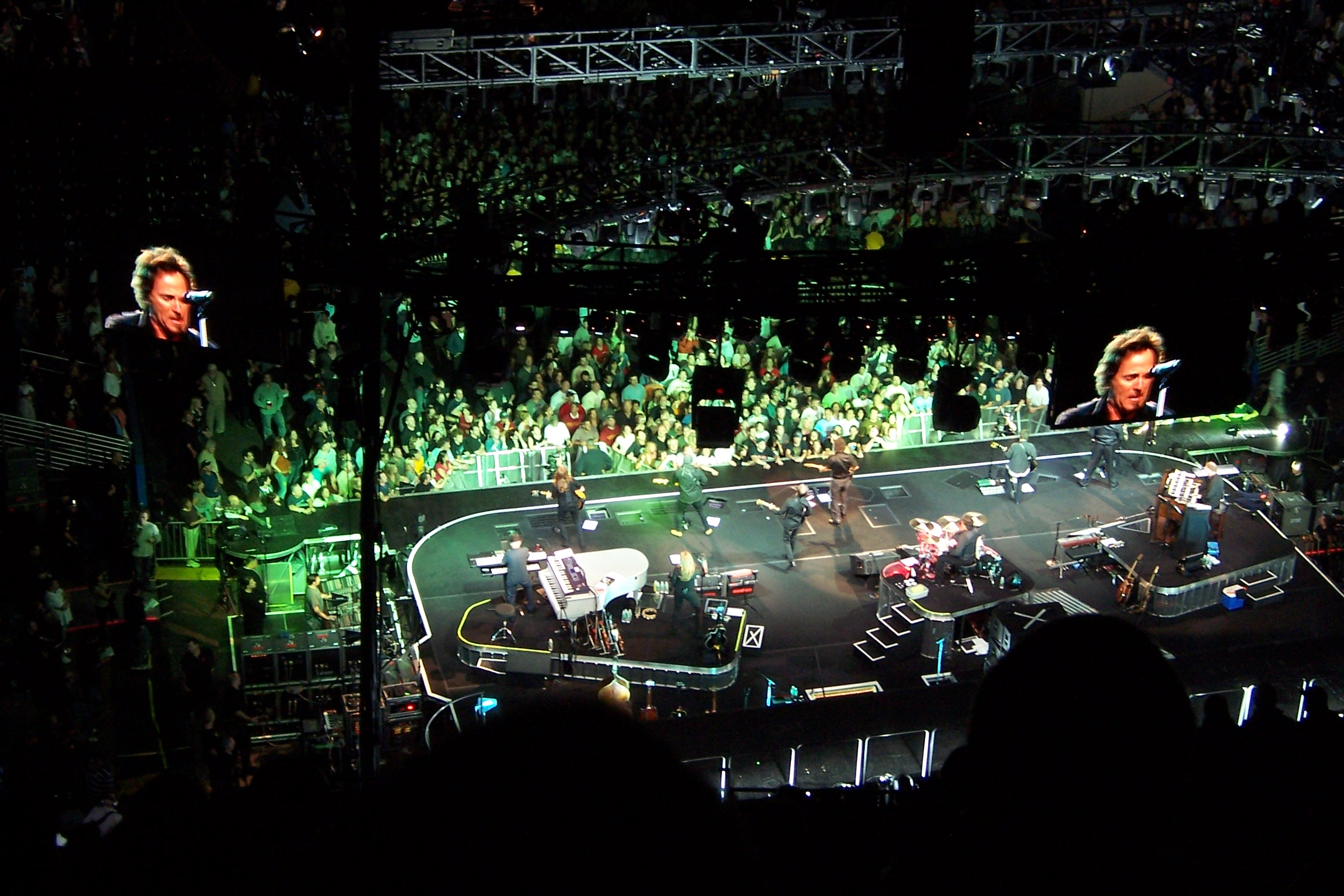
"Radio Nowhere" opens the tour at the Hartford Civic Center. October 2, 2007.

When the tour opened at the Hartford Civic Center, several things were immediately apparent. The show was clearly shorter than in years past, beginning at around 8:30 and ending at around 10:45. However, more songs were played than could be extrapolated from this time, given past practice, due to the omission of elongated numbers with stage hijinks, and in particular no long monologues or band intros. As guitarist Nils Lofgren said of the tour's start, "Bruce tried to do an experiment with condensing everything, covering all the emotional territory he needed to."

Soozie Tyrell, while now clearly not an official member of the E Street Band by analysis of publicity material, tour T-shirts and the like, was nonetheless a full member on-stage, appearing on every song with some combination of violin, acoustic guitar, and backing vocals. On the front line of the stage, age was taking its toll: on one side Clarence Clemons was once again sitting in a chair when not playing his saxophone or percussion parts and needing a steadying hand for getting on and off stage, while Danny Federici was also looking a little frail. On the other side, not only was Springsteen's teleprompter (a fixture since the early 1990s) still in view, but sidekick Steven Van Zandt had his own (for lyrics) as did wife and band member Patti Scialfa (for guitar chords). In the latter respect, however, the show featured a breakthrough: the first Scialfa song played in its entirety, the mid-set "A Town Called Heartbreak", which would continue to be played intermittently on the first leg of the tour. Drummer Max Weinberg also had a small teleprompter within his drum kit, showing lyrics, unusual in that Weinberg does not sing onstage.

The set list heavily leaned on Magic material, as might be expected, with The Rising initially also well represented. The 1970s were also featured, with a number of songs off Born to Run and Darkness on the Edge of Town. Thematically, the show was organized in recent Springsteen fashion, with certain fixed sequences that appeared every night, interspersed with "wild card" sequences in which a variety of recent or old songs might appear. Shows usually began with a calliope playing "The Daring Young Man on the Flying Trapeze" as the band took the stage, followed by several calls out from the darkness by Springsteen — "Is there anybody alive out there!?" Then, as might be expected, Magic's first single "Radio Nowhere" and its expression of social longing began the concert. This was followed by some older number, such as "The Ties That Bind" or "No Surrender", that supplied that social connection, and then by The Rising's "Lonesome Day" to balance the equation. The next part of the show brought out ''Magic'''s political undercurrents, first with a spoken introduction to "Magic" that made clear that song's understated lyric: "This is about living in times when the truth gets twisted into lies and lies get twisted into truth. So, it's not about magic. It's about tricks." Thus set up to follow was just that, a trick: yet another at-first-puzzling rendition of the always challenging "Reason to Believe". The Nebraska closer was transformed from a low-key acoustic number to a heavy-hitting, harmonica-driven, boogie-woogie blues rock version, with Springsteen pumping up the audience with phantom overhand throwing motions ... all for a song that represented, despite frequent misinterpretations, a void empty of hope; only a return of the Devils & Dust Tour's ultra-distorting "bullet mic" at the end served to reveal a bit of the deceit. An explicit public service announcement rap during "Livin' in the Future" listed Springsteen's complaints about developments in American during the George W. Bush administration, including extraordinary rendition, illegal wiretapping, voter suppression, no habeas corpus, New Orleans after Hurricane Katrina, and the continuing Iraq War. "The Promised Land" followed by wild card slots would then alleviate the mood.

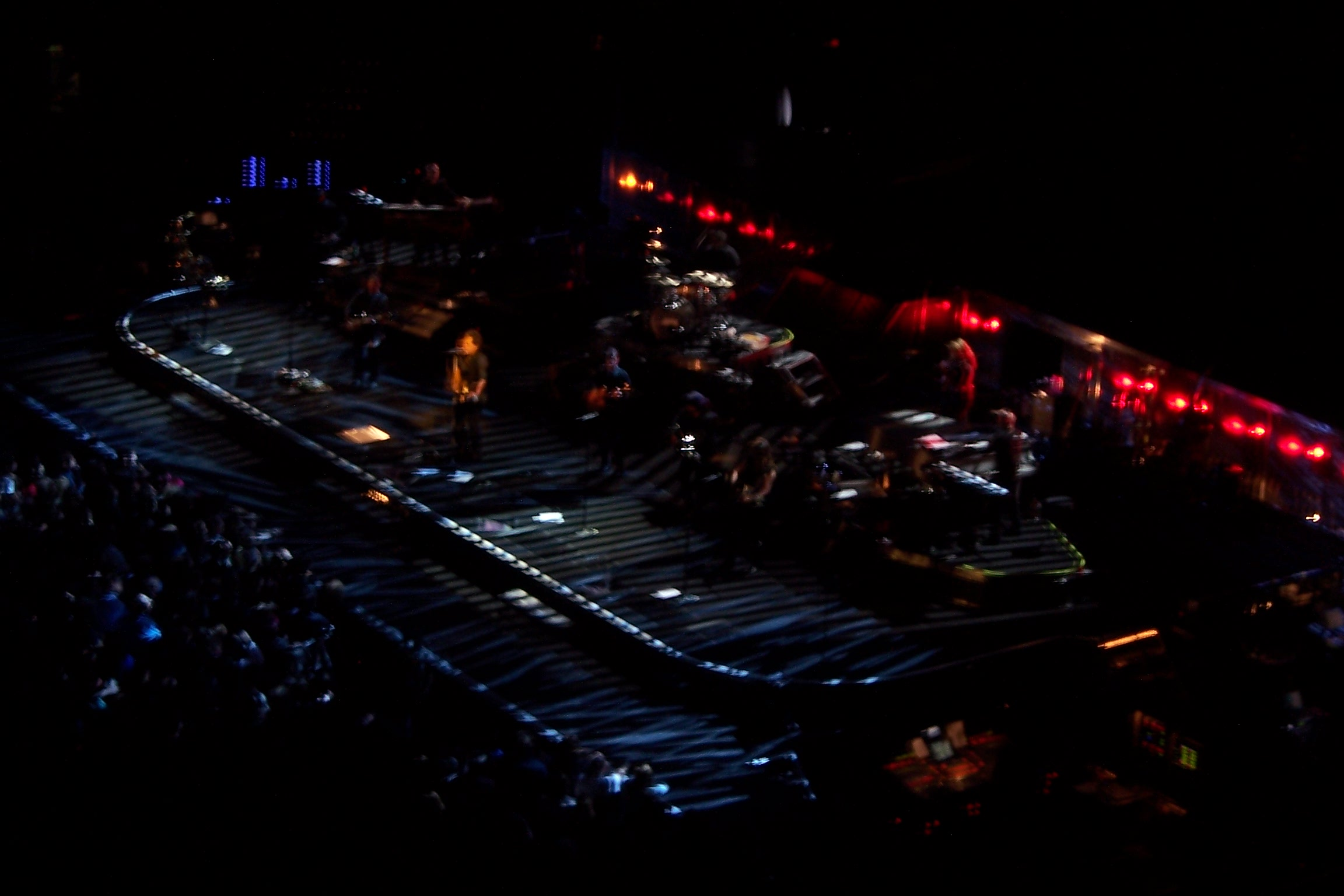
Pensive striped lighting on the stage with red accents alternating on Springsteen, the stage rear, and finally Weinberg's drum outro, illustrated performances of "Devil's Arcade". TD Banknorth Garden, Boston, November 18, 2007.

Another fixed, socio-political sequence occurred at the end of the main set, "Devil's Arcade" into "The Rising" into "Last to Die" into "Long Walk Home" into "Badlands". In an interview, Springsteen said of the transition out of "The Rising" and into "Last to Die", signalling the course of American society from the September 11 attacks to the Iraq War, "The whole night is going to turn on that segue. That's what we're up there for right now, that thirty seconds." Encores started with the relaxed lament of the new "Girls in Their Summer Clothes". This was followed by potluck back catalog choices, often involving one of his long epics, the inevitable "Born to Run", a celebratory "Dancing in the Dark", and as the show finalé, "American Land". This, the only holdover from the Sessions Band Tour, featured Clemons on pennywhistle, both Federici and Bittan on accordion and joining Tyrell and the others on the front stage line, in an up-tempo jig that sought to convey the whole tale of immigration to the United States. As such it careened wildly in purpose between a rousing closer and a message summation; these dual roles were found in the start with Springsteen's exclamation over drums, “It's your country, don't let anyone take it from you!” and was emphasized as the tour went on, when the large video screens above the stage began scrolling the lyrics as the song played, and then illustrated Springsteen's quick-paced band intro spiel with 1960s Batman-styled cartoon bursts: E! Street! Band!

The European second leg featured very enthusiastic crowds and shows lengthening towards two and a half hours, but also largely static set lists, possibly due to stand-in organist Charlie Giordano needing time to learn the Springsteen oeuvre. By the North American third leg, set lists were slightly loosened, with "Night" or other choices often preceding "Radio Nowhere" as the show opener. Oddball selections showed up more as wild cards or audibles, sometimes prompted by audience signs held up in the pit below the stage. The signs practice became more frequent starting in March, and eventually built up into a tradition that would carry over to the band's next tour. Clemons' chair was now comically upgraded to a gilded throne, with a tambourine placed next to it so he could play along on songs where he was catching a breather. His role overall was not diminished, however, as "Jungleland" and his longest and most famous saxophone solo began appearing more often in the encores. "Long Walk Home" gained more emphasis, with Nils Lofgren and especially Steve Van Zandt adding their own vocal parts during the coda.

Once the tour resumed following Federici's death, the existing structure began to break down. For the first seven shows, a video montage about Federici, set to past-tour-finale-song "Blood Brothers", was shown preceding the start. Many old songs were performed, both well known, such as "Growin' Up", and songs which had remained virtually unplayed for 20 years, such as "Wild Billy's Circus Story". Magic slots were reduced and its songs put on rotation; the middle of the set became extremely varied, with "Livin' in the Future" and "She's the One" the only constants. "The Promised Land", which had been a mid-set regular, was moved to various places in the set lists. Encore length varied, but again "Born to Run" and "American Land" remained the only constants. The band found that playing shows helped them to cope with the emotional effects of the loss of Federici.

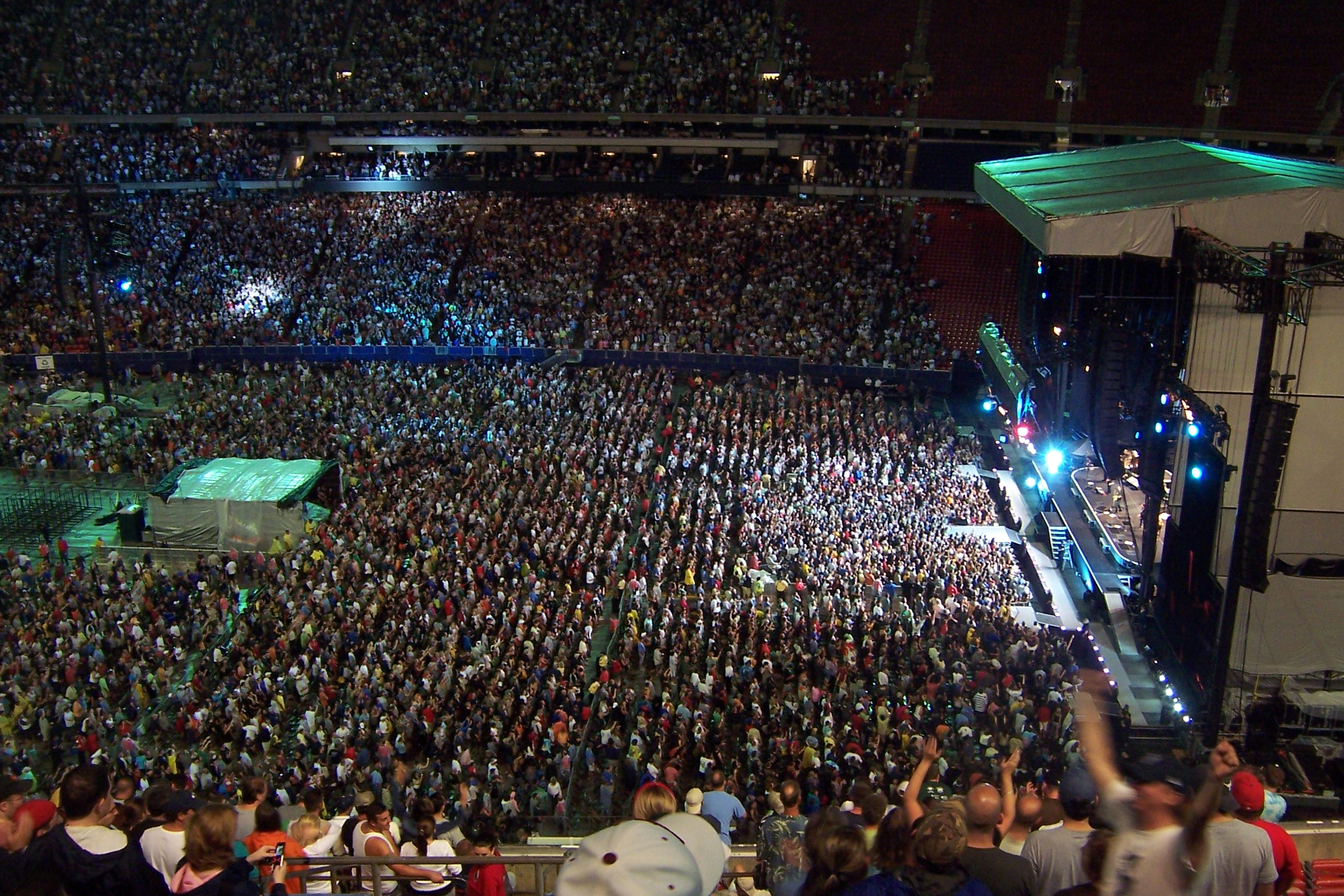
The Magic Tour goes outdoors. "Born to Run", Giants Stadium, New Jersey Meadowlands, July 27, 2008.

On the European outdoor summer's leg, where unlike in the U.S. Springsteen was still a stadium-level attraction, the shows became increasingly longer, a pattern that had been taking hold throughout the tour. The Helsinki Olympic Stadium show in Finland ran past three hours, containing 31 songs (in that metric, the longest show of Springsteen's since 1993 on the "Other Band" Tour and the longest with the E Street Band since 1988). As the tour left Helsinki, the group had played a total of 117 different songs over 87 shows, the list having been expanded in Europe with rarities like "I'm on Fire", "Held Up Without a Gun", "For You", "Drive All Night", "Rendezvous", "Summertime Blues", "Cover Me", and "None but the Brave". Front pit audience signs and Springsteen audibles from same were now a constant feature of every show; never having been done by the band before, the Springsteen official website said that "All of us have been enjoying the signs and banners with song requests," and requested that they be kept a reasonable size during the upcoming final American leg. In some cases, songs were audibled that the band had not rehearsed at all, and arrangements were made up on the spot. Clemons, Lofgren, and Weinberg all indicated they enjoyed the new unexpectedness of the shows. Magic selections, in contrast, were sometimes down to four from their original usual eight. E Streeter Nils Lofgren described the state of the show in an interview after the end of this European leg: "The band, musically, is in the best shape we've ever been, I think. The whole show has become one long improv/audible now; sometimes [Springsteen] changes the first song on the way to the stage, and usually by the second song he's calling audibles, so the set list is useless. It's fun to be part of something ... where a band leader can do that much improv and get away with it and have a band that'll deliver and make it work. So, it's all really a pretty historic run, from my perspective."

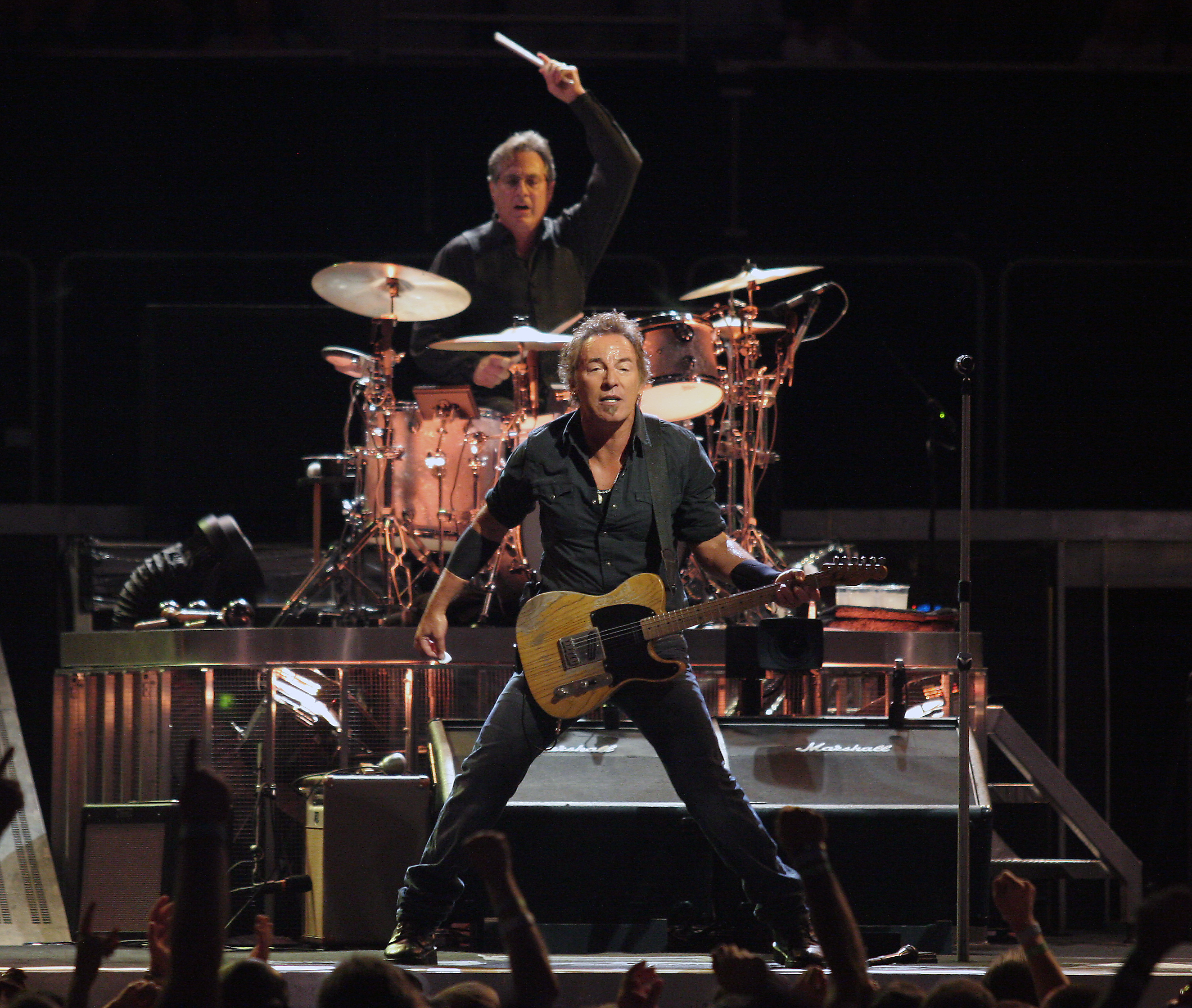
Max Weinberg keeps his eye on Springsteen at all times during a show. Veterans Memorial Arena, Jacksonville, Florida, August 15, 2008.

The fifth and final U.S. leg began with three shows at Giants Stadium, seen at the time as possibly Springsteen's last there. The opening "Tenth Avenue Freeze-Out" had the upper deck literally shaking, while Lofgren's impromptu somersault during "Because the Night" astounded everyone, especially since Lofgren was headed to double hip replacement surgery after the tour. The practice of longer shows and of songs played for sign requests continued. The latter was now cued by an extended drumbeat for "Summertime Blues" or "Light of Day" while Springsteen collected and assessed the many signs. The fourth and fifth legs also featured a new "Build Me a House" stage rap from Springsteen, located in 15-minute renditions of "Mary's Place"; the rap would carry over onto the next tour, albeit in a different song. Springsteen obscurities continued to be played, although the stadium audiences would be inattentive for quiet, intense numbers such as "Drive All Night". In other cases, the band would hash out onstage the key in which to play "It's Hard to Be a Saint in the City". The biggest surprise was "Crush on You", which had not been performed since The River Tour in 1980; Springsteen explained why by saying, "We firmly believe this is the worst song we ever put on a record." Show lengths and energy were such that Lofgren sometimes wondered whether the audience was up to handling extra songs in the encores.

Beginning with the Gillette Stadium show, one-off renditions of old 1960s songs that Springsteen had heard growing up, and that he and the band had played decades before, began showing up in set lists, sometimes taking up to as many five slots in a show. Such numbers included "Pretty Flamingo", "Little Latin Lupe Lu", "You Can't Sit Down", "Double Shot (Of My Baby's Love)", "Gloria", "I Fought the Law", "Then She Kissed Me", "Mountain of Love", "It's All Over Now" (with Soozie Tyrell taking her first lead vocal with the E Street Band), and "Boys" (with Max Weinberg surprisingly doing the same). In the final stretch of shows, Springsteen expressed the freedom to take on anything and everything. The tour's final performance at Harleyfest featured Danny Federici's son Jason playing accordion on "Sandy", followed by venue-thematic selections such as "Wooly Bully", "Gypsy Biker", "Racing in the Street", and a tour finale of "Born to be Wild". By the conclusion, some 144 to 148 different songs had been played, depending upon how snippets were counted.

At the conclusion of the Harley show, Springsteen told the audience, "We just had the greatest tour of our lives." Springsteen would later say that the Magic Tour constituted "some of the most exciting shows we've ever done." And Springsteen echoed the sentiment he expressed before the tour's start, that it was not a swansong for the band, at the final show of it, saying "We'll be seein' ya ... we're only just getting started."

== Critical and commercial reception ==
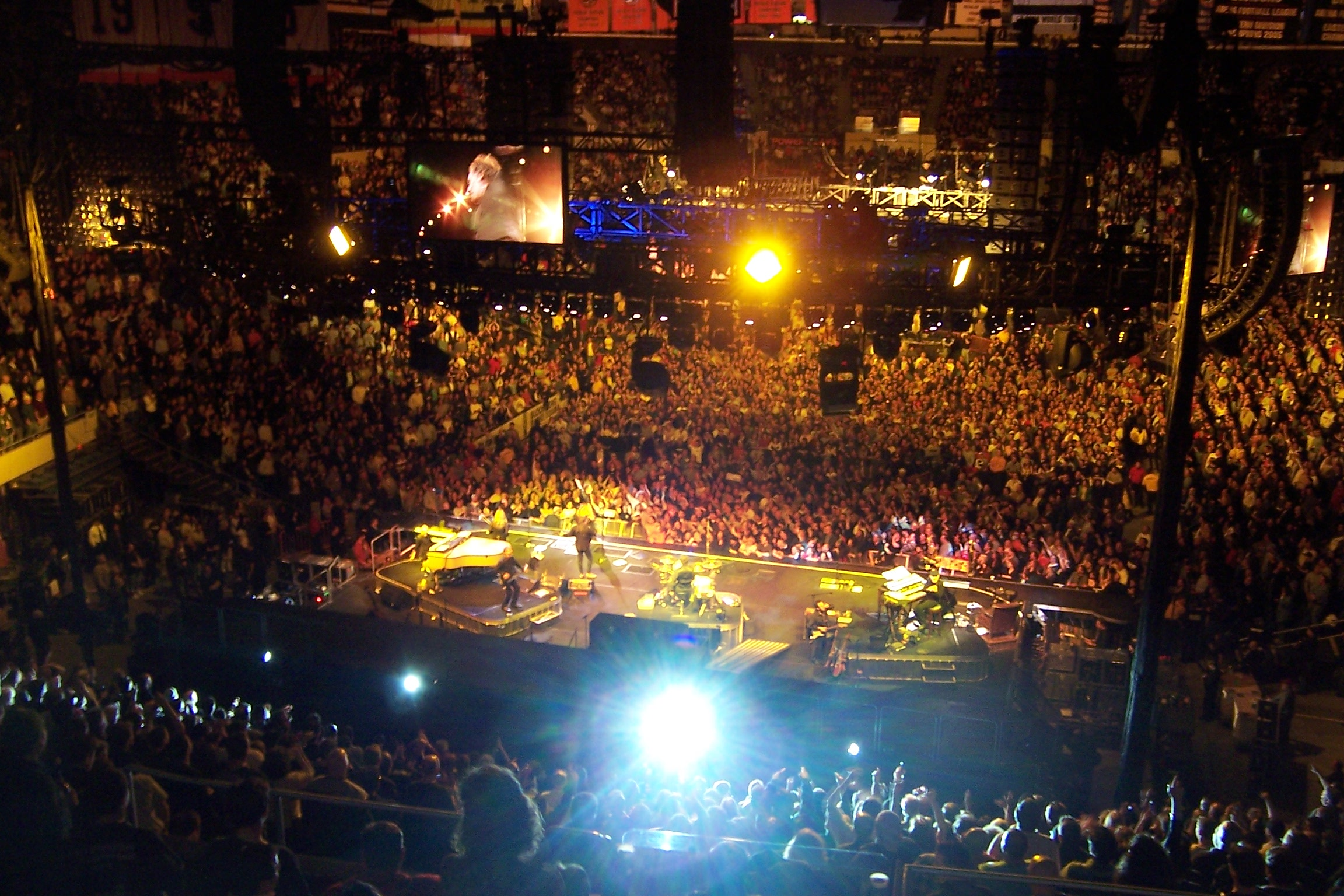
Searchlight-style effects challenge the audience during one of the show's most political numbers, "Livin' in the Future". Nassau Coliseum, March 10, 2008. The Clarence Clemons "throne" can be seen to the right of the organ position.

Reviews of the Magic Tour were generally favorable. The New Haven Register found the band "ripping through a spirited set" on opening night and judged Weinberg, Van Zandt, and Clemons as the main stars of the performance besides Springsteen. The paper also profiled fans who had come from nearby states to see the opener. A Jon Pareles review in The New York Times of a Madison Square Garden show two weeks later framed the performance thusly:

The sheer vitality of Mr. Springsteen, 58, belting an entire set of showstoppers straight from the gut and working the stage with his longtime band, provides all the hope the lyrics struggle to find. He's as serious as any public figure alive, but he leaves audiences euphoric — a paradox that only grows more profound as he endures.

The Syracuse New Times summed an Albany, New York, show late in the first leg as "a masterful presentation of Springsteen’s new album Magic and a few moments of his mumbling political cajoling, all wrapped up in a joyous rock’n’roll revival replete with his most famous hits going back to the 1970s."

North American ticket sales during the first leg were generally strong. Prime markets in the Northeast sold out in less than ten minutes. The faithful knew, as usual, that this was only the beginning of the ticket acquisition process, as the later secondary market — online ticket outlet drops of held-back allotments, later drops due to stage setup revelations, day of show drop lines, online forum exchanges, and eBay — all offered opportunities for success. The first, North American leg garnered $38.2 million in ticket revenues, making it the 14th biggest grossing concert tour in North America for 2007. Springsteen saw more younger fans appearing in America than in a decade, while in Europe younger fans were constantly replenishing his fan base.

Meanwhile, over in Europe, the London concert, which went on sale first on August 30, sold out in about ten minutes. The Belfast concert sold out in eight minutes, setting a venue record for The Odyssey; thousands left standing outside the venue, other ticket outlets, or phone or online users, were left quite frustrated. Most of the tickets were bought by major companies and sold on eBay or other websites for hundreds of pounds. The Belgian concert was sold out in a few minutes, the booking site having experienced constant lag.

On the show's third leg, the Rochester Democrat and Chronicle praised the show's concentration on newer material and detected implicit support for the presidential campaign of Barack Obama. In a USA Today interview Springsteen professed admiration for both Obama's effort and rival Hillary Rodham Clinton's campaign, although he seemed to have a greater affinity for the former: "I always look at my work as trying to measure the distance between American promise and American reality. And I think [Obama]'s inspired a lot of people with that idea: How do you make that distance shorter? How do we create a more humane society? We've lived through such ugly times that people want to have a romance with the idea of America again, and I think they need to." The Milwaukee Journal Sentinel saw the concert there as exemplifying Springsteen's ability to have "dark words ride along on a buoyant pop melody", terming the enterprise "an exercise in danceable agitation."

Commercially, though, the third leg was softer, with most of its shows not sold out. Moreover, when tickets went on sale in December 2007 for three hometown, summer 2008, fifth-leg Giants Stadium shows, they did not come close to selling out right away, and may never have. This paled in comparison to the fast sales and many added dates for The Rising Tour's Giants Stadium stand in 2003; theories advanced included poor sales timing before the holiday season and way in advance of the shows, a worsening U.S. economy, stagnant European second leg set lists, and aftereffects of Springsteen's Vote for Change explicit political stances and non-E Street Band tours. Nevertheless, the Giants Stadium stand grossed over $14 million, and was the fifth-highest concert stand gross for 2008. For the first half of 2008, the Magic Tour third leg was the second-highest grossing tour in North America, garnering $40.8 million, behind Bon Jovi's Lost Highway Tour for that period but ahead of the Van Halen 2007–2008 Tour. The European outdoor fourth leg was very strong commercially, selling out or nearly selling out its shows. The Billboard Boxscore Top Ten Concert Grosses report for the issue the week after the leg ended showed the first nine positions all held by Magic Tour shows; the highest grossing was the two nights at Barcelona's Camp Nou, where 143,804 total attendees brought in over $14 million gross.

By the tour's finishing fifth leg, critical reaction was again strong. Of the penultimate show in St. Louis, Billboard wrote that the band had "unleash[ed] an epic, loose show that wowed the unwowable and flapped the unflappable."

Ticketmaster Entertainment's TicketsNow portal reported that the average resale price of a 2008 Magic Tour ticket had been $235, sixth highest among touring acts for the year.

== Personnel ==
=== The E Street Band ===
Final frame of cartoon-style E! – Street! – Band! video screen sequence at the end of the tour's shows. Nassau Coliseum, March 10, 2008.

- Bruce Springsteen - lead vocals, lead guitar, rhythm guitar, acoustic guitar, harmonica, very occasional piano
- Roy Bittan – piano, synthesizer, accordion
- Clarence Clemons – tenor saxophone, baritone saxophone, percussion, pennywhistle, background vocals
- Danny Federici – organ, electronic glockenspiel, accordion (first leg, one appearance on third leg)
- Nils Lofgren – rhythm guitar, lead guitar, pedal steel guitar, acoustic guitar, background vocals
- Patti Scialfa - background vocals, some featured lead and duet vocals, acoustic guitar
- Garry Tallent – bass guitar, occasional background vocals
- Steven Van Zandt – rhythm guitar, lead guitar, mandolin, background vocals, occasional featured lead vocal
- Max Weinberg – drums, one surprise lead vocal

with:

- Charles Giordano – organ, accordion, piano (second and subsequent legs), very occasional background vocals
- Soozie Tyrell - violin, acoustic guitar, background vocals, some featured duet vocals when Scialfa absent, one lead vocal

guest musicians:

- The Arcade Fire
- Jon Bon Jovi
- Joe Ely
- Alejandro Escovedo
- Joe Grushecky
- Roger McGuinn

The beginning line-up was unchanged from the 2002–2003 Rising Tour.

Scialfa missed a number of shows in the North American first leg, and all the shows in the European second leg, due to family duties. She missed all but one of the shows in the North American third leg as well, with Springsteen giving different humorous explanations at each stop for her absence, all revolving around their teenage children misbehaving. Scialfa said she was staying home to enjoy the last year of all three children being together, and to be fully involved in their eldest child's college application and decision process. Despite vowing to attend the European fourth leg, she missed all of those shows as well, until the Spanish ones at the end of the leg. She was at the first four shows of the fifth leg, then missed the rest of those too.

== Broadcasts and recordings ==
Early on the first leg, the starting three songs (one more than planned) of the October 10, 2007, Continental Airlines Arena show were broadcast live over VH1 Classic. Throughout much of the tour, video clips of one performance from a show, usually cut down to a one- to two-minute excerpt, would be posted on Springsteen's official website.

On July 4, 2008, with much fanfare, Sirius Satellite Radio's E Street Radio channel broadcast selected songs from the show that day at the Ullevi in Gothenburg, Sweden, although in practice there was much more of host Dave Marsh talking with phone callers than there was of the concert.

On July 15, 2008, Springsteen released the live audio and video EP Magic Tour Highlights, which collected guest appearances from the third leg, including Federici's only return.

Several shows were released as part of the Bruce Springsteen Archives:

- Scottrade Center, St. Louis, MO, 8/23/08 released on April 14, 2017
- TD Banknorth Garden, Boston 11/19/07 released on April 6, 2018
- St. Pete Times Forum, Tampa, FL April 22, 2008 released on February 1, 2019
- Greensboro Coliseum Complex, Greensboro, NC April 28, 2008 released on November 6, 2020
- Indianapolis Consesco Fieldhouse March 20, 2008 released on October 22, 2021
- Nashville Sommett Center August 21, 2008 released on December 2, 2022
- Anyway Arena, Orlando, FL, April 23, 2008 released on April 11, 2025
- Oracle Arena, Oakland, CA-October 26, 2007 released on November 7, 2025

== Tour dates ==
Date	City	Country	Venue	Attendance	Revenue
North America
September 24, 2007	Asbury Park	United States	Convention Hall	—	
September 25, 2007	Asbury Park	United States	Convention Hall	—	
September 28, 2007	East Rutherford	United States	Izod Center	—	
October 2, 2007	Hartford	United States	Hartford Civic Center	15,290 / 15,290	$1,401,205
October 5, 2007	Philadelphia	United States	Wachovia Center	38,229 / 38,229	$3,616,172
October 6, 2007	Philadelphia	United States	Wachovia Center	38,229 / 38,229	$3,616,172
October 9, 2007	East Rutherford	United States	Izod Center	38,976 / 38,976	$3,604,315
October 10, 2007	East Rutherford	United States	Izod Center	38,976 / 38,976	$3,604,315
October 14, 2007	Ottawa	Canada	Scotiabank Place	13,616 / 13,616	$1,568,391
October 15, 2007	Toronto	Canada	Air Canada Centre	18,677 / 18,677	$2,113,450
October 17, 2007	New York City	United States	Madison Square Garden	37,735 / 37,735	$3,435,254
October 18, 2007	New York City	United States	Madison Square Garden	37,735 / 37,735	$3,435,254
October 21, 2007	Chicago	United States	United Center	35,697 / 35,697	$3,300,087
October 22, 2007	Chicago	United States	United Center	35,697 / 35,697	$3,300,087
October 25, 2007	Oakland	United States	Oracle Arena	34,859 / 34,859	$2,581,456
October 26, 2007	Oakland	United States	Oracle Arena	34,859 / 34,859	$2,581,456
October 29, 2007	Los Angeles	United States	Los Angeles Memorial Sports Arena	34,080 / 34,080	$2,949,650
October 30, 2007	Los Angeles	United States	Los Angeles Memorial Sports Arena	34,080 / 34,080	$2,949,650
November 2, 2007	Saint Paul	United States	Xcel Energy Center	18,970 / 18,970	$1,754,825
November 4, 2007	Cleveland	United States	Quicken Loans Arena	19,299 / 19,299	$1,644,179
November 5, 2007	Auburn Hills	United States	The Palace of Auburn Hills	19,555 / 19,555	$1,231,928
November 11, 2007	Washington, D.C.	United States	Verizon Center	36,256 / 36,256	$3,210,760
November 12, 2007	Washington, D.C.	United States	Verizon Center	36,256 / 36,256	$3,210,760
November 14, 2007	Pittsburgh	United States	Mellon Arena	16,883 / 16,883	$1,372,652
November 15, 2007	Albany	United States	Times Union Center	15,654 / 15,654	$1,462,460
November 18, 2007	Boston	United States	TD Banknorth Garden	33,379 / 33,379	$3,072,570
November 19, 2007	Boston	United States	TD Banknorth Garden	33,379 / 33,379	$3,072,570
Europe
November 25, 2007	Madrid	Spain	Barclaycard Center	15,000 / 15,000	
November 26, 2007	Bilbao	Spain	Bizkaia Arena	20,000 / 20,000	
November 28, 2007	Milan	Italy	DatchForum	12,500 / 12,500	
December 1, 2007	Arnhem	Netherlands	Gelredome	33,000 / 33,000	
December 2, 2007	Mannheim	Germany	SAP Arena	15,000 / 15,000	
December 4, 2007	Oslo	Norway	Oslo Spektrum	12,000 / 12,000	
December 8, 2007	Copenhagen	Denmark	Forum Copenhagen	10,000 / 10,000	
December 10, 2007	Stockholm	Sweden	Stockholm Globe Arena	15,895 / 15,895	
December 12, 2007	Antwerp	Belgium	Sportpaleis	17,826 / 17,826	
December 13, 2007	Cologne	Germany	Kölnarena	18,000 / 18,000	
December 15, 2007	Belfast	Northern Ireland	Odyssey Arena	14,000 / 14,000	
December 17, 2007	Paris	France	Palais Omnisports de Paris-Bercy	16,000 / 16,000	
December 19, 2007	London	England	The O_{2} Arena	15,000 / 15,000	
North America
February 28, 2008	Hartford	United States	XL Center	15,409 / 15,409	$1,415,280
March 2, 2008	Montreal	Canada	Bell Centre	15,238 / 15,238	$1,716,718
March 3, 2008	Hamilton	Canada	Copps Coliseum	18,229 / 18,229	$1,985,770
March 6, 2008	Rochester	United States	Blue Cross Arena	12,428 / 12,428	
March 7, 2008	Buffalo	United States	HSBC Arena	18,875 / 18,875	$1,364,855
March 10, 2008	Uniondale	United States	Nassau Coliseum	17,518 / 17,518	$1,488,769
March 14, 2008	Omaha	United States	Qwest Center Omaha	17,208 / 17,208	$1,608,720
March 16, 2008	Saint Paul	United States	Xcel Energy Center	17,002 / 17,002	$1,583,879
March 17, 2008	Milwaukee	United States	BMO Harris Bradley Center	16,104 / 16,104	$1,467,960
March 20, 2008	Indianapolis	United States	Conesco Fieldhouse		
March 22, 2008	Cincinnati	United States	U.S. Bank Arena	15,754 / 15,754	$1,090,969
March 24, 2008	Columbus	United States	Schottenstein Center	17,637 / 17,637	$1.479,571
March 28, 2008	Portland	United States	Rose Garden	15,999 / 15,999	$1,208,955
March 29, 2008	Seattle	United States	KeyArena	15,160 / 15,160	$1,357,190
March 31, 2008	Vancouver	Canada	General Motors Place	20,000 / 20,000	
April 4, 2008	Sacramento	United States	ARCO Arena	15,323 / 15,323	$1,255,625
April 5, 2008	San Jose	United States	HP Pavilion	16,002 / 16,002	$1,453,960
April 7, 2008	Anaheim	United States	Honda Center	35,102 / 35,102	$2,500,860
April 8, 2008	Anaheim	United States	Honda Center	35,102 / 35,102	$2,500,860
April 13, 2008	Dallas	United States	American Airlines Center	16,006 / 16,006	$1,424,650
April 14, 2008	Houston	United States	Toyota Center	16,585 / 16,585	$1,654,295
April 22, 2008	Tampa	United States	St. Pete Times Forum		
April 23, 2008	Orlando	United States	Amway Arena	9,600 / 16,368	$886,050
April 25, 2008	Atlanta	United States	Philips Arena	17,630 / 17,630	$1,666,489
April 27, 2008	Charlotte	United States	Charlotte Bobcats Arena	16,802 / 16,802	$1,556,444
April 28, 2008	Greensboro	United States	Greensboro Coliseum	13,813 / 15,199	$1,271,045
April 30, 2008	Charlottesville	United States	John Paul Jones Arena	13,893 / 13,893	$1,274,345
May 2, 2008	Sunrise	United States	BankAtlantic Center		
Europe
May 22, 2008	Dublin	Ireland	RDS Arena	115,500 / 115,500	$14,353,725
May 23, 2008	Dublin	Ireland	RDS Arena	115,500 / 115,500	$14,353,725
May 25, 2008	Dublin	Ireland	RDS Arena	115,500 / 115,500	$14,353,725
May 28, 2008	Manchester	England	Old Trafford Stadium	41,074 / 50,000	$4,307,628
May 30, 2008	London	England	Emirates Stadium	91,712 / 91,712	$9,733,778
May 31, 2008	London	England	Emirates Stadium	91,712 / 91,712	$9,733,778
June 14, 2008	Cardiff	Wales	Millennium Stadium	48,549 / 48,549	$4,866,576
June 16, 2008	Düsseldorf	Germany	LTU Arena	33,196 / 38,000	$3,282,790
June 18, 2008	Amsterdam	Netherlands	Amsterdam ArenA	36,257 / 36,529	$4,370,497
June 21, 2008	Hamburg	Germany	HSH Nordbank Arena	41,697 / 41,697	$4,168,176
June 23, 2008	Antwerp	Belgium	Sportpaleis	17,686 / 17,686	$1,940,010
June 25, 2008	Milan	Italy	San Siro	59,821 / 59,821	$4,225,418
June 27, 2008	Paris	France	Parc des Princes	40,661 / 45,067	$4,141,306
June 29, 2008	Copenhagen	Denmark	Parken	45,929 / 45,929	$5,298,725
July 4, 2008	Gothenburg	Sweden	Ullevi	115,720 / 115,720	$11,266,116
July 5, 2008	Gothenburg	Sweden	Ullevi	115,720 / 115,720	$11,266,116
July 7, 2008	Oslo	Norway	Valle Hovin Stadion	79,984 / 79,984	$9,220,272
July 8, 2008	Oslo	Norway	Valle Hovin Stadion	79,984 / 79,984	$9,220,272
July 11, 2008	Helsinki	Finland	Olympiastadion	42,552 / 42,552	$4,757,806
July 15, 2008	San Sebastián	Spain	Anoeta	44,384 / 44,384	$4,706,802
July 17, 2008	Madrid	Spain	Santiago Bernabéu	53,783 / 55,000	$5,546,856
July 19, 2008	Barcelona	Spain	Camp Nou	143,804 / 143,804	$14,182,722
July 20, 2008	Barcelona	Spain	Camp Nou	143,804 / 143,804	$14,182,722
North America
July 27, 2008	East Rutherford	United States	Giants Stadium	164,070 / 164,070	$14,201,938
July 28, 2008	East Rutherford	United States	Giants Stadium	164,070 / 164,070	$14,201,938
July 31, 2008	East Rutherford	United States	Giants Stadium	164,070 / 164,070	$14,201,938
August 2, 2008	Foxboro	United States	Gillette Stadium	50,000 / 50,000	$4,760,337
August 15, 2008	Jacksonville	United States	Jacksonville Arena	13,500 / 13,500	$1,222,190
August 16, 2008	North Charleston	United States	North Charleston Coliseum	11,971 / 11,971	$1,064,688
August 18, 2008	Richmond	United States	Richmond Coliseum	12,704 / 12,704	$1,201,404
August 19, 2008	Hershey	United States	Hersheypark Stadium	31,020 / 31,020	$2,995,575
August 21, 2008	Nashville	United States	Sommet Center	15,345 / 16,000	$1,105,669
August 23, 2008	St. Louis	United States	Scottrade Center	17,000 / 17,000	$1,445,159
August 24, 2008	Kansas City	United States	Sprint Center	17,004 / 17,004	$1,385,393
August 30, 2008	Milwaukee	United States	Harleyfest, The Roadhouse at the Lakefront	70,000 / 70,000	$5,243,002

== Songs performed ==
Originals

Greetings from Asbury Park, New Jersey

- "Blinded by the Light"
- "Does This Bus Stop at 82nd Street?"
- "For You"
- "Growin' Up"
- "It's Hard to Be a Saint in the City"
- "Lost in the Flood"
- "Spirit in the Night"

The Wild, the Innocent & the E Street Shuffle

- "4th of July, Asbury Park (Sandy)"
- "Incident on 57th Street"
- "Kitty's Back"
- "Rosalita (Come Out Tonight)"
- "The E Street Shuffle"
- "Wild Billy's Circus Story"

Born to Run

- "Backstreets"
- "Born to Run"
- "Jungleland"
- "Night"
- "Meeting Across the River"
- "She's the One"
- "Tenth Avenue Freeze-Out"
- "Thunder Road"

Darkness on the Edge of Town

- "Adam Raised a Cain"
- "Badlands"
- "Candy's Room"
- "Darkness on the Edge of Town"
- "The Promised Land"
- "Prove It All Night
- "Racing in the Street
- "Something in the Night"
- "Streets of Fire"

The River

- "Cadillac Ranch"
- "Crush on You" (last performed 1980)
- "Drive All Night (last E Street Band performance 1981)
- "Hungry Heart"
- "I'm a Rocker"
- "Independence Day"
- "Jackson Cage"
- "Out in the Street"
- "Point Blank"
- "Ramrod"
- "The River"
- "Sherry Darling"
- "The Ties That Bind"
- "Two Hearts"
- "You Can Look (But You Better Not Touch)"

Nebraska

- "Atlantic City"
- "Reason to Believe"
- "State Trooper" (last E Street Band performance 1984)

Born in the U.S.A.

- "Bobby Jean"
- "Born in the U.S.A."
- "Cover Me" (last performed 1992)
- "Dancing in the Dark"
- "Darlington County"
- "Downbound Train"
- "Glory Days"
- "I'm Goin' Down"
- "I'm on Fire"
- "My Hometown"
- "No Surrender"
- "Working on the Highway"

Tunnel of Love

- "Brilliant Disguise"
- "Tougher Than the Rest"
- "Tunnel of Love"

Lucky Town

- "If I Should Fall Behind"
- "Souls of the Departed" (last performed 2004)

Greatest Hits

- "Blood Brothers"
- "Murder Incorporated"
- "This Hard Land"

The Ghost of Tom Joad

- "The Ghost of Tom Joad"
- "Youngstown"

Tracks

- "Back in Your Arms"
- "Be True"
- "Cynthia"
- "Don't Look Back"
- "Janey, Don't You Lose Heart"
- "Loose Ends"
- "Part Man, Part Monkey"
- "Rendezvous"
- "Ricky Wants a Man of Her Own" (first ever performance)
- "Roulette"
- "So Young and in Love"
- "Stand on It"
- "Thundercrack"

The Rising

- "Lonesome Day"
- "Mary's Place"
- "The Rising"
- "Waitin' on a Sunny Day"

The Essential Bruce Springsteen

- "From Small Things (Big Things One Day Come)"
- "Held Up Without a Gun"
- "None But the Brave" (first E Street Band performance)

Devils & Dust

- "Devils & Dust"

We Shall Overcome: The Seeger Sessions

- "American Land"
- "Buffalo Gals" (partial song)

Magic

- "Devil's Arcade"
- "Girls in Their Summer Clothes"
- "Gypsy Biker"
- "I'll Work For Your Love"
- "Last to Die"
- "Livin' in the Future"
- "Long Walk Home"
- "Magic"
- "Radio Nowhere"
- "Terry's Song"
- "You'll Be Comin' Down" (first and only ever performance)
- "Your Own Worst Enemy"

Other (non-album songs)

- "Because the Night"
- "Fire"
- "Light of Day"
- "Code of Silence" (with Joe Grushecky)
- "Town Called Heartbreak" (performed by Patti Scialfa early in the tour)

Cover songs

- "Always a Friend" (with Alejandro Escovedo)
- "All Just to Get You" (with Joe Ely)
- "Boom Boom" (last E Street Band performance 1988)
- "Boys" (Max Weinberg on vocals)
- "Detroit Medley"
- "Double Shot (Of My Baby's Love)" (last performed 1981)
- "Gloria" (with Joe Gruschecky)
- "Good Rockin' Tonight"
- "I'll Fly Away"
- "I Fought the Law"
- "I Walk the Line" (partial song)
- "It's All Over Now"
- "Keep the Car Running" (with Arcade Fire
- "Little Latin Lupe Lu"
- "Mountain of Love" (Harold Dorman) (last performed 1975)
- "Mr. Tambourine Man" (with (Roger McGuinn)
- "Not Fade Away"
- "Pretty Flamingo"
- "Quarter to Three"
- "Rockin' All Over the World"
- "Santa Claus Is Coming to Town"
- "Save the Last Dance for Me"
- "Seven Nights to Rock"
- "Summertime Blues" (last performed 1981)
- "Then She Kissed Me"
- "Trapped"
- "Turn! Turn! Turn!" (w/ Roger McGuinn)
- "You Can't Sit Down"
- "Who'll Stop the Rain"
- "Wooly Bully"

== See also ==
- List of highest grossing concert tours
