= Magic Tour Highlights =

EP by Bruce Springsteen and the E Street Band
- Released: July 15, 2008
- Recorded: March/April 2008
- Genre: Rock, heartland rock
- Length: 24:44
- Label: Columbia Records

Bruce Springsteen and the E Street Band chronology
Magic (2007)	Magic Tour Highlights (2008)	Greatest Hits (2009)

Bruce Springsteen chronology
Magic (2007)	Magic Tour Highlights (2008)	Greatest Hits (2009)

Magic Tour Highlights is an EP by Bruce Springsteen and the E Street Band, which consists of four live audio tracks and their accompanying videos, and was released for digital download on July 15, 2008. The performances were recorded during the 2008 Magic Tour, and feature guest musicians, as well as Danny Federici's last performance with the group.

The proceeds from the sales will support the Danny Federici Melanoma Fund.

== Track listing ==
All songs are written by Bruce Springsteen, except where noted.

No.	Title	Writer(s)	Date and place	Length
1.	"Always A Friend" (Live Version)	Alejandro Escovedo, Chuck Prophet	April 14, 2008, Houston, Texas	4:49
2.	"The Ghost of Tom Joad" (Live Version)		April 7, 2008, Anaheim, California	8:39
3.	"Turn! Turn! Turn!" (Live Version)		April 23, 2008, Orlando, Florida	4:09
4.	"4th Of July, Asbury Park (Sandy)" (Live Version)		March 20, 2008, Indianapolis, Indiana	7:07

== Personnel ==
- Bruce Springsteen - guitar, vocals
- Roy Bittan – piano
- Clarence Clemons – saxophone, percussion
- Charlie Giordano – organ
- Nils Lofgren - guitar, backing vocals
- Garry Tallent - bass
- Soozie Tyrell - violin, backing vocals
- Steve Van Zandt - guitar, backing vocals
- Max Weinberg - drums
- Danny Federici - accordion
- Recording – John Cooper
- Mixing – Bob Clearmountain
- Mastering – Bob Ludwig
- Video Recording Director – Chris Hilson
- Video Editing – Thom Zinny
- Digital Booklet Design – Michelle Holme
