= Magic (Bruce Springsteen album) =

Studio album by Bruce Springsteen
- Released: September 25, 2007
- Recorded: March 12 – May 2007
- Studios: Southern Tracks, Atlanta, Georgia
- Genre: Rock
- Length: 47:47
- Label: Columbia
- Producer: Brendan O'Brien

Bruce Springsteen chronology
Bruce Springsteen with The Sessions Band: Live in Dublin (2007)	Magic (2007)	Magic Tour Highlights (2008)

Bruce Springsteen and the E Street Band chronology
Hammersmith Odeon London '75 (2006)	Magic (2007)	Magic Tour Highlights (2008)

Singles from Magic
- 1. "Radio Nowhere" Released: August 28, 2007; 2. "Girls in Their Summer Clothes" Released: January 15, 2008

Magic is the fifteenth studio album by the American singer-songwriter Bruce Springsteen, released by Columbia Records on LP on September 25, 2007, and on CD on October 2. It was his first with the E Street Band since The Rising in 2002, and topped the charts in six countries, including the US and UK, going triple platinum in Ireland. Two songs from the album – "Radio Nowhere" and "Girls in Their Summer Clothes" – won a total of three Grammys, making Magic the second of only two Springsteen albums with three wins, after The Rising. It ranked No. 2 on Rolling Stone's list of the Top 50 Albums of 2007.

== Background ==
Magic was announced on August 16, 2007, following months of speculation, and was characterized by Springsteen's manager Jon Landau as a "high energy rock" album with a "heavy E Street Band" sound. It consisted of new tracks, apart from "Long Walk Home", which had been performed once on the latter part of the 2006 Sessions Band Tour. Most songs had been written by the end of 2006, and Springsteen allowed Brendan O'Brien, who had also produced The Rising (2002) and Devils & Dust (2005), to pick the ones that worked the best. Recording commenced in March at Southern Tracks Recording Studio in Atlanta and took two months. It was complicated by the band members' schedules, especially drummer Max Weinberg's weekday commitments to taping Late Night with Conan O'Brien. The musicians did not record as a unit. During the week Springsteen worked on vocal tracks and production, and was joined on weekends by the core band of Weinberg, bassist Garry Tallent, and pianist Roy Bittan to record the basic tracks. The other band members overdubbed their parts under O'Brien's watch, apart from saxophonist and longtime foil Clarence Clemons, who worked directly with Springsteen due to "a whole dynamic that spans decades."

The lead-off single, "Radio Nowhere", had been slated for a September 4 release, but was leaked on August 22. The release of the CD on October 2 was preceded by a September 25 release on vinyl record, in order to qualify for the Grammy Awards. The album became available for pre-order on iTunes on August 28, with a promotion featuring "Radio Nowhere" as a free downloadable single, and the first legs of the accompanying Magic Tour were also announced.

== Themes ==
Several songs in Magic express disillusionment with the state of American society. Others, such as the title track ("I got a shiny saw blade/All I need's a volunteer/I'll cut you in half/While you're smilin' ear to ear") convey a more general sense of foreboding. "Girls in Their Summer Clothes" has been cited as a singularly "breezy" song on the album, although A. O. Scott of The New York Times notes that not even this track is "untouched by melancholy. Its narrator, after all, stands and watches as the girls of the title 'pass me by.'" Several sources have suggested that "Last to Die", with its chorus of "Who'll be the last to die for a mistake/Whose blood will spill, whose heart will break", was inspired by Vietnam Veterans Against the War representative John Kerry's 1971 testimony to the U.S. Senate, in which he asked "How do you ask a man to be the last man to die in Vietnam? How do you ask a man to be the last man to die for a mistake?". "Gypsy Biker" concerns the homecoming of a US soldier killed in action in Iraq, and Springsteen has said that "Livin' in the Future" references extraordinary rendition and illegal wiretapping. "Long Walk Home" is a metaphorical account of the narrator's sense that, in the artist's words, those people living at home "he thought he knew, whose ideals he had something in common with, are like strangers."

== Release and sales ==
Magic sold well, becoming Springsteen's seventh No. 1 in the UK, with first week sales of 77,692, making it his fastest-starting release of the 21st century. The album debuted at No. 1 on the US Billboard 200 chart, becoming Springsteen's eighth chart topper, and selling about 335,000 copies in its first week. After falling to No. 2 for one week, it retook the top slot, selling about 77,000 copies that week. Magic achieved its US sales despite receiving relatively little radio airplay. Fox News reported that media conglomerate Clear Channel had instructed its classic rock stations not to play any tracks from the album, while continuing to play Springsteen songs from the 1970s and '80s. Clear Channel responded by claiming that "in the first days after the CD's release" its stations had played the record more than others had. By January 2009, Magic had sold one million copies in the US.

== Critical reception ==
Professional ratings
Aggregate scores
Source	Rating
Metacritic	73/100
Review scores
Source	Rating
AllMusic	3.5/5 stars
Entertainment Weekly	A
Los Angeles Times	4/4 stars
Mojo	5/5 stars
Paste	4/5 stars
Pitchfork	6.8/10
PopMatters	8/10
Rolling Stone	5/5 stars
Spin	3.5/5 stars
Uncut	4/5 stars

Critics generally responded positively to the album. Pitchfork noted that it was "a surprisingly complex album that hides its disillusionment deep within its music, mingling it with a weary optimism that has not diminished with age." In The Village Voice's annual Pazz & Jop critics poll for the year's best albums, Magic ranked No. 9. It ranked No. 2 on Rolling Stone's list of the Top 50 Albums of 2007, and "Long Walk Home" was No. 8 on its list of the 100 Best Songs of 2007 The album was nominated for the Grammy Award for Best Rock Album but lost to the Foo Fighters' Echoes, Silence, Patience & Grace.

== Track listing ==
All tracks are written by Bruce Springsteen.

No.	Title	Length
1.	"Radio Nowhere"	3:19
2.	"You'll Be Comin' Down"	3:46
3.	"Livin' in the Future"	3:56
4.	"Your Own Worst Enemy"	3:19
5.	"Gypsy Biker"	4:32
6.	"Girls in Their Summer Clothes"	4:20
7.	"I'll Work for Your Love"	3:35
8.	"Magic"	2:46
9.	"Last to Die"	4:17
10.	"Long Walk Home"	4:35
11.	"Devil's Arcade"	5:08
12.	"Terry's Song" (Hidden track)	4:11

Two weeks after the album's initial announcement, which included an eleven-song track listing, "Terry's Song" was added. It is a memorial song for Springsteen's long-time assistant Terry Magovern, who died on July 30, 2007. Some pressings of the CD pre-ordered through Sony Music or other channels did not contain the extra track.

== Personnel ==
- Bruce Springsteen – lead and backing vocals, guitars, pump organ, harmonica, synthesizer, glockenspiel, percussion

The E Street Band

- Roy Bittan – piano, organ
- Clarence Clemons – saxophone, backing vocals
- Danny Federici – organ, keyboards
- Nils Lofgren – guitars, backing vocals
- Patti Scialfa – backing vocals
- Garry Tallent – bass
- Steven Van Zandt – guitars, mandolin, backing vocals
- Max Weinberg – drums

Additional musicians

- Soozie Tyrell – violin (tracks 3, 7–9), backing vocals (track 8)
- Jeremy Chatzky – upright bass (track 8)
- Daniel Laufer – cello (track 11)
- Patrick Warren – Chamberlin, tack piano (tracks 4, 6, 8, 10, 11)
- String section (tracks 4, 6):
  - Kenn Wagner, Jay Christy, Justin Bruns, William Pu, Cristopher Pulgram, John Meisner, Olga Shpitko, Sheela Lyengar – violins
  - Tania Maxwell Clements, Amy Chang, Lachlan McBane – viola
  - Karen Freer, Daniel Laufer, Charae Kruege – cello

Technical

- Brendan O'Brien – production, mixing
- Nick DiDia – recording
- Billy Bowers – additional engineering
- Tom Tapley – recording and mixing assistant
- Toby Scott – additional recording engineer
- Tom Syrowski, Matt Serrecchio, Glenn Pittman, Kevin Mills – additional recording assistants
- Bob Ludwig – mastering
- Eddie Horst – string arrangements (tracks 4, 6)
- Patti Horst, Shari Sutcliffe – string contractors (tracks 4, 6)
- Michelle Holme, Chris Austopchuk – album art direction
- Mark Seliger, Danny Clinch – photography
- Bea Nettles – disk icon

== Charts ==
=== Weekly charts ===
Weekly chart performance for Magic
Chart (2007)	Peak position
Australian Albums (ARIA)	2
Austrian Albums (Ö3 Austria)	1
Belgian Albums (Ultratop Flanders)	3
Belgian Albums (Ultratop Wallonia)	11
Canadian Albums (Billboard)	1
Czech Albums (ČNS IFPI)	11
Danish Albums (Hitlisten)	1
Dutch Albums (Album Top 100)	2
Finnish Albums (Suomen virallinen lista)	4
French Albums (SNEP)	3
German Albums (Offizielle Top 100)	3
Greek Foreign Albums (IFPI)	5
Hungarian Albums (MAHASZ)	9
Irish Albums (IRMA)	1
Italian Albums (FIMI)	1
New Zealand Albums (RMNZ)	2
Norwegian Albums (VG-lista)	1
Polish Albums (ZPAV)	13
Portuguese Albums (AFP)	12
Spanish Albums (Promusicae)	1
Swedish Albums (Sverigetopplistan)	1
Swiss Albums (Schweizer Hitparade)	4
UK Albums (Official Charts)	1
US Billboard 200	1
US Top Rock Albums (Billboard)	1

=== Year-end charts ===
2007 year-end chart performance for Magic
Chart (2007)	Position
Australian Albums (ARIA)	75
Austrian Albums (Ö3 Austria)	55
Belgian Albums (Ultratop Flanders)	56
Dutch Albums (Album Top 100)	34
French Albums (SNEP)	113
German Albums (Offizielle Top 100)	57
Irish Albums (IRMA)	18
Swedish Albums (Sverigetopplistan)	3
Swiss Albums (Schweizer Hitparade)	42
UK Albums (OCC)	77
US Billboard 200	72
US Top Rock Albums (Billboard)	11

2008 year-end chart performance for Magic
Chart (2008)	Position
Swedish Albums (Sverigetopplistan)	69
US Billboard 200	128

== Certifications and sales ==
Certifications and sales for Magic
Region	Certification	Certified units/sales
Australia (ARIA)	Gold	35,000^{^}
Austria (IFPI Austria)	Gold	10,000^{*}
Belgium (BRMA)	Gold	15,000^{*}
Denmark (IFPI Danmark)	Platinum	30,000^{^}
Germany (BVMI)	Platinum	200,000^{‡}
Italy	—	120,000
Ireland (IRMA)	3× Platinum	45,000^{^}
Netherlands (NVPI)	Gold	35,000^{^}
New Zealand (RMNZ)	Gold	7,500^{^}
Spain (Promusicae)	Platinum	80,000^{^}
Sweden (GLF)	2× Platinum	80,000^{^}
Switzerland (IFPI Switzerland)	Gold	15,000^{^}
United Kingdom (BPI)	Gold	100,000^{^}
United States (RIAA)	Platinum	1,000,000^{^}
Summaries
Europe (IFPI)	Platinum	1,000,000^{*}
^{*} Sales figures based on certification alone.^{^} Shipments figures based on certification alone.^{‡} Sales+streaming figures based on certification alone.
