= Girls in Their Summer Clothes =

Single by Bruce Springsteen

from the album Magic
- Released: January 15, 2008
- Recorded: March–April 2007
- Genre: Alternative rock, pop rock
- Length: 4:20
- Label: Columbia
- Songwriter: Bruce Springsteen
- Producer: Brendan O'Brien

Bruce Springsteen singles chronology
"Long Walk Home" (2007)	"Girls in Their Summer Clothes" (2008)	"Dream Baby Dream" (2008)

Music video
- "Girls in Their Summer Clothes" on YouTube

"Girls in Their Summer Clothes" is a song by American recording artist Bruce Springsteen, from his album Magic.

Matched with a pop-oriented melody, Springsteen's full-throated singing, and a pop-orchestral arrangement, the lyric portrays a series of warm small-town vignettes:

Frankie's Diner, an old friend on the edge of town,
The neon sign spinning round,
Like a cross over the lost and found.
Fluorescent lights flicker over Pop's Grill,
Shaniqua brings the coffee and asks "Fill?"
and says, "Penny for your thoughts now my boy, Bill"

"Girls in Their Summer Clothes" has been cited as a singularly "breezy" song on the album, though A. O. Scott of The New York Times notes: "Not that 'Girls in Their Summer Clothes' is untouched by melancholy. Its narrator, after all, stands and watches as the girls of the title 'pass me by.'" Jay Lustig of The Star-Ledger writes that the song "unfolds gradually and at its own eccentric pace, with the music, and Springsteen's vocals, getting progressively more intense." At the 51st Grammy Awards, the song was nominated for Best Rock Song and Best Solo Rock Vocal Performance, winning the former.

== Releases ==
It was released for iTunes digital download on January 15, 2008, as a single-like "bundle" consisting of two audio tracks and an accompanying video. As such the "Winter Mix" of the song was presented, which featured a single not doubled Springsteen vocal track, some added or enhanced percussion parts, and similar small changes. In addition to the Winter Mix, a live version was included. The release achieved minor chart success, reaching positions 95 on the Billboard Hot 100, 67 on the Pop 100, and 62 on Hot Digital Songs. It also hit 27 on Billboard's Mainstream Rock charts.

The music video for the song (entitled "Girls in Their Summer Clothes (Winter Mix)") was directed by Mark Pellington. Filmed on the Jersey Shore on a cold winter day, it showed girls and women of various ages, interspersed with shots of Springsteen strumming his vintage Gibson J-45 acoustic guitar. The backing E Street Band was not shown. Parts of the video mirrored the song's imagery, especially the diner scene.

== Live performances ==
"Girls in Their Summer Clothes" was regularly featured on the 2007–2008 Magic Tour, often as the first encore song, although it suffered being dropped during a number of shows in early portions of 2008. One such first leg of tour performance was recorded and included in the January 2008 digital download bundle.

Although the song's lush pop-orchestral production approach was extended on many of the tracks of Springsteen's 2009 album Working on a Dream, "Girls in Their Summer Clothes" was little played on Springsteen and the E Street Band's associated Working on a Dream Tour.

== Grammy nominations and award ==
In typically delayed fashion, the song garnered two nominations for the Grammy Awards of 2009: Best Rock Song and Best Solo Rock Vocal Performance. It won the first, but lost the second to John Mayer's "Gravity". Springsteen subsequently confessed that he had not been tracking this closely: "I didn't even know I was up for a Grammy! I opened the newspaper on Monday and saw that I had won, and thought, 'Well, that's great!'"

== Track listing ==
1. "Girls in Their Summer Clothes" (Winter Mix) - 4:20
2. "Girls in Their Summer Clothes" (Live) - 5:17
3. "Girls in Their Summer Clothes" (Video) - 4:21

== Charts ==
Weekly chart performance for "Girls in Their Summer Clothes"
Chart (2007)	Peak position
US Billboard Hot 100	95
US Adult Alternative Airplay (Billboard)	8
US Digital Song Sales (Billboard)	62

== Personnel ==
From album liner notes:

- Bruce Springsteen - vocals, guitar, pump organ, harmonica, synthesizer, glockenspiel, percussion
- Roy Bittan - piano, organ
- Clarence Clemons - saxophone, backing vocals
- Danny Federici - organ, keyboards
- Nils Lofgren - guitar, backing vocals
- Patti Scialfa - backing vocals
- Garry Tallent - bass
- Steven Van Zandt - guitar, mandolin, backing vocals
- Max Weinberg - drums

Additional musicians:

- Patrick Warren - Chamberlin, tack piano

String Section:

- Kenn Wagner, Jay Christy, Justin Bruns, William Pu, Cristopher Pulgram, John Meisner, Olga Shpitko, Sheela Lyengar - violins
- Tania Maxwell Clements, Amy Chang, Lachlan McBane - violas
- Karen Freer, Daniel Laufer, Charae Kruege - cellos
