= Radio Nowhere =

Single by Bruce Springsteen

from the album Magic
- Released: August 28, 2007
- Recorded: March–April 2007
- Genre: Rock
- Length: 3:20
- Label: Columbia
- Songwriter: Bruce Springsteen
- Producer: Brendan O'Brien

Bruce Springsteen singles chronology
"Pay Me My Money Down" (2006)	"Radio Nowhere" (2007)	"Long Walk Home" (2007)

Music video
- Radio Nowhere on Youtube.com

"Radio Nowhere" is the first single released from Bruce Springsteen's 2007 studio album, Magic. It was awarded Best Solo Rock Vocal Performance and Best Rock Song at the Grammy Awards of 2008.

== History ==
The song is an up-tempo, electric guitar-driven, modern rocker that features E Street Band members Max Weinberg on drums, Garry Tallent on bass guitar, Clarence Clemons on saxophone, Steven Van Zandt, Clemons and Patti Scialfa on background vocals, and Nils Lofgren on a guitar part underneath Clemons's sax solo.

"Radio Nowhere" was made available as a free, limited-timespan download "exclusively" from the iTunes Store starting on August 28, 2007 (although it was also available from Guardian Unlimited). The site also offered a pre-order of the new album. Sony BMG created a site, www.radionowheredownload.com, which offered the single for free for Springsteen's fan base in Europe in advance of the commercial release of the album.

Despite heavy promotion, the song was not a chart success in the United States. It failed to enter the Billboard Hot 100, although it reached number 2 on the Triple-A chart. The song performed significantly better in European countries, proving most successful in Norway and Ireland where it peaked at number 2 in both countries.

"Radio Nowhere" was included on Springsteen's 2009 Greatest Hits compilation.

== Music video ==
The music video for "Radio Nowhere", directed by Thom Zimny, was released on Amazon.com on September 4, 2007. It consists mostly of Springsteen and the E Street Band playing the song in a darkened studio, interspersed with filmed Manhattan street scenes and a few shots of a recent promotional photograph of Springsteen being torn.

== Live performance history ==
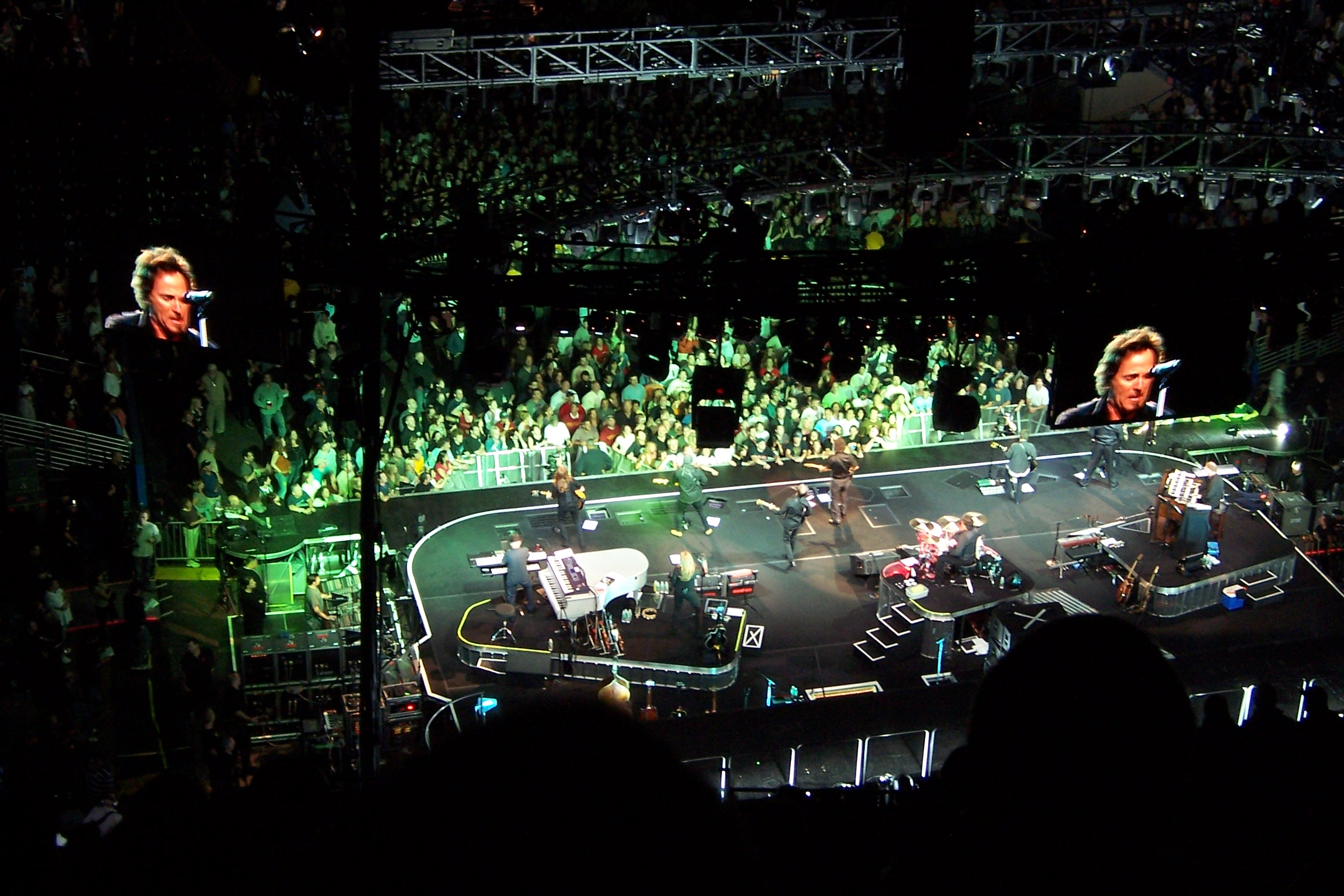
"Radio Nowhere" opens the Magic Tour at the Hartford Civic Center. October 2, 2007. The green lighting scheme became associated with the song.

"Radio Nowhere" was the set opener for Bruce Springsteen and the E Street Band's 2007–2008 Magic Tour during the first leg. It subsequently shifted to being the second song played, with various other choices ahead of it, but overall it was performed in every show of that tour but one.

On the 2009 Working on a Dream Tour, "Radio Nowhere" was the only song from Magic that was regularly performed. Its position on the setlist was often moved around to match the segment of the concert where 18-year-old Jay Weinberg substituted for his father on drums.

== Tommy Tutone controversy ==
"Radio Nowhere" features a set of guitar riffs and chord progression at the beginning that many fans considered particularly similar to "867-5309/Jenny", written by Alex Call and Jim Keller, lead guitarist for Tommy Tutone, although the lyrics and the tone of the two songs are quite different.

Tommy Tutone lead singer Tommy Heath was quoted as saying: "Everybody's calling me about it," and that, "I think it's close enough that if I wanted to [take legal action], I could work with it." Heath later clarified that he did not intend to take action and that he felt "really honored at a similarity, if any". Both songs were released on Columbia Records.

== Charts ==
Chart (2007)	Peak position
Canadian Hot 100 (Billboard)	55
Germany (Media Control Charts)	90
Ireland (IRMA)	24
Italy (Top Digital Download)	25
Norway (VG-lista)	2
Sweden (Sverigetopplistan)	60
Switzerland (Singles Chart)	87
UK Singles Chart	96
US Bubbling Under Hot 100 Singles (Billboard)	2
US Triple A (Billboard)	2

== Certifications ==
Certifications and sales for "Radio Nowhere"
Region	Certification	Certified units/sales
United States (RIAA)	Gold	500,000^{‡}
^{‡} Sales+streaming figures based on certification alone.
