= Long Walk Home =

Promotional single by Bruce Springsteen

from the album Magic
- Released: (United States) September 25, 2007 (vinyl record); October 2, 2007 (CD) (United Kingdom) October 1, 2007 (Australia) October 8, 2007 (Thailand) October 11, 2007
- Recorded: March – April/May 2007; Southern Tracks Recording Studio, Atlanta, Georgia
- Genre: Rock, alternative rock, heartland rock
- Length: 4:35
- Label: Columbia Records
- Songwriter: Bruce Springsteen
- Producer: Brendan O'Brien

Bruce Springsteen singles chronology
"Radio Nowhere" (2007)	"Long Walk Home" (2007)	"Girls in Their Summer Clothes" (2008)

Music video
- Long Walk Home on Youtube.com

"Long Walk Home" is a song written and performed by the American singer-songwriter Bruce Springsteen. It first appeared on his Sessions Band Tour of that year, in folk guise in the European leg of the tour in London for one performance only. Reworked with different and shorter lyrics, it was recorded by Springsteen and the E Street Band as a mid-tempo rocker and released on the 2007 Springsteen album Magic. This song was #8 on Rolling Stone's list of the 100 Best Songs of 2007. The song was released as a promo single. Springsteen had said that it was a song about how he felt in the times of George W. Bush. "In that particular song a guy comes back to his town and recognizes nothing and is recognized by nothing," Springsteen told The New York Times' A. O. Scott. "The singer in 'Long Walk Home,' that's his experience. His world has changed. The things that he thought he knew, the people who he thought he knew, whose ideals he had something in common with, are like strangers. The world that he knew feels totally alien. I think that's what's happened in this country in the past six years."

Although only released as a promotional single, the song was highlighted when a music video was made and released on 25 September 2007, the same day as the video for Magic first single "Radio Nowhere". The video featured real-life scenes from Springsteen's Jersey Shore interspersed with shots of Springsteen at Asbury Park Convention Hall and at Tony's diner on Main Street in Freehold.
