= Max Weinberg =

American drummer, member of the E Street Band (born 1951)

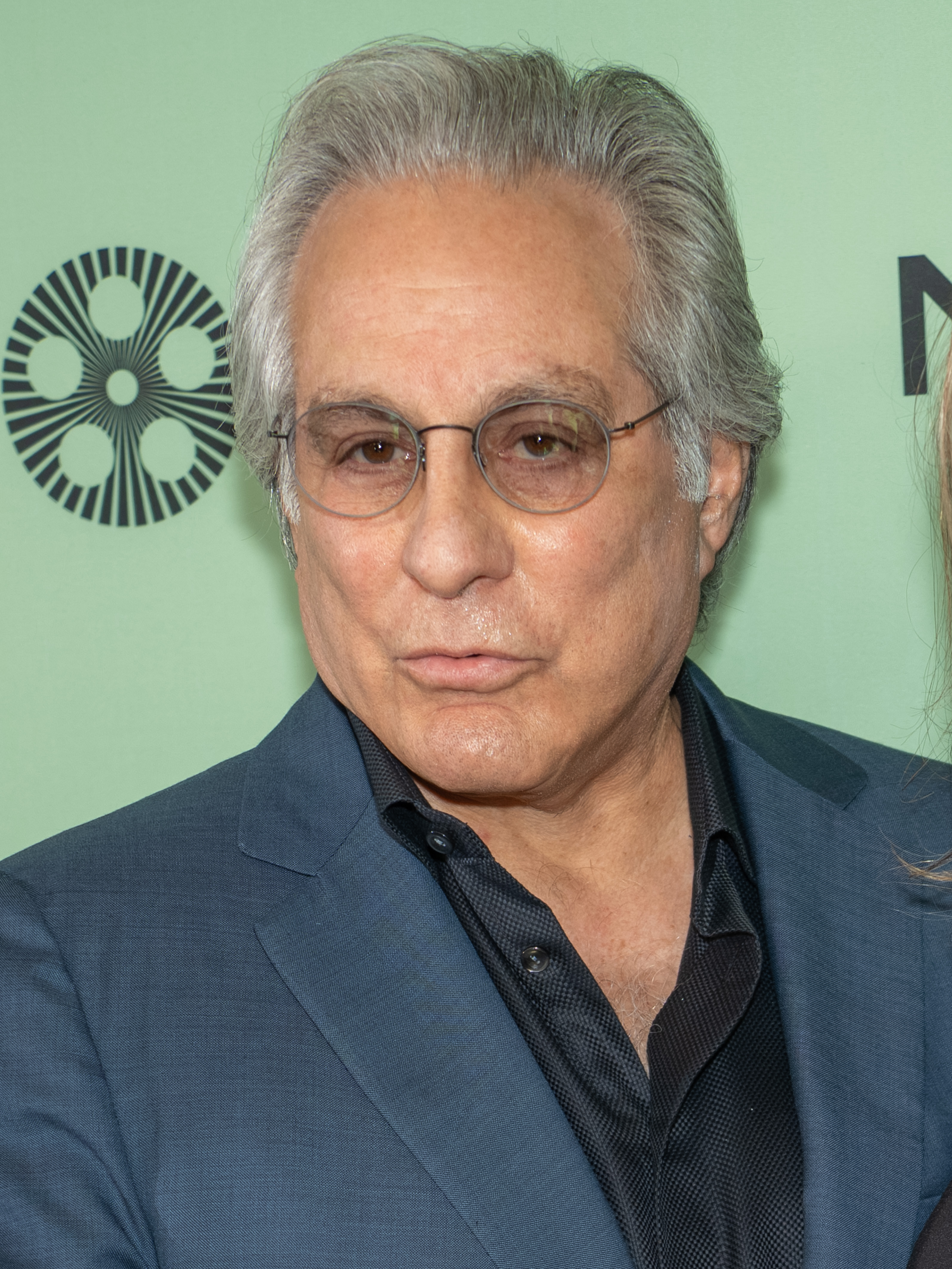
- Weinberg in 2025

Background information
- Also known as: Mighty Max
- Born: April 13, 1951 (age 75); Newark, New Jersey, U.S.
- Genres: Rock; jump blues; big band
- Occupations: Musician; bandleader; session musician
- Instrument: Drums
- Years active: 1964–present
- Label: Columbia
- Member of: E Street Band; The Max Weinberg 7; Max Weinberg and The Tonight Show Band
- Website: maxweinberg.com

Max Weinberg (born April 13, 1951) is an American drummer and television personality, most widely known as the longtime drummer for Bruce Springsteen's E Street Band and as the bandleader for Conan O'Brien on Late Night with Conan O'Brien and The Tonight Show with Conan O'Brien. He is the father of former Slipknot and Suicidal Tendencies drummer Jay Weinberg.

Weinberg grew up in suburban New Jersey and began drumming at an early age. He attended college planning to be a lawyer but got his big break in music in 1974 when he won an audition to become the drummer for Springsteen. Weinberg became a mainstay of Springsteen's long concert performances. Springsteen dissolved the band in 1989, and Weinberg spent several years considering a law career and trying the business end of the music industry before deciding he wanted to continue with drumming.

In 1993, Weinberg got the role as bandleader of the Max Weinberg 7 for Late Night with Conan O'Brien. Weinberg's drums-driven jump blues sound and his role as a comic foil prospered along with the show, giving him a second career. In 1999, Springsteen re-formed the E Street Band for a series of tours and albums; Weinberg worked out an arrangement that allowed him to play with both O'Brien and Springsteen. In 2009, Weinberg moved to the short-lived Tonight Show with Conan O'Brien as leader of Max Weinberg and The Tonight Show Band. Upon that program's conclusion, Weinberg declined to follow O'Brien to the new Conan show. Weinberg has continued playing with Springsteen, and in 2014 was inducted into the Rock and Roll Hall of Fame as a member of the E Street Band.

== Early life ==
Weinberg was born on April 13, 1951, to a Jewish family in Newark, New Jersey, to parents Bertram Weinberg, an attorney, and Ruth Weinberg, a high school physical education teacher. He has three sisters, Patty, Nancy and Abby. He grew up in Newark as well as in the neighboring suburban towns of South Orange and Maplewood.

Weinberg was exposed to music early on, attending Broadway shows weekly from the age of two and liking the big sound put forth by the pit orchestras. He then liked the rhythms of country and western music. He knew he wanted to be a drummer from the age of five, when he saw Elvis Presley and his drummer, D. J. Fontana, appear on The Milton Berle Show in April 1956. Decades later, Weinberg said, "I think anybody who wanted to develop a life in rock 'n' roll music had a moment. That was my moment," and Fontana became a major influence on him. Weinberg received a child's conga drum from his father after he watched a TV show featuring bandleader Xavier Cugat. In a 2020 article in The Wall Street Journal, Weinberg described the drum as having a "... a real calfskin head and a white strap. I played it all over the house."

Weinberg has also acknowledged the Ventures as a major influence on him in a TV interview in 1988 to celebrate that band's 30th anniversary and he actually sat in on drums during the performances.

Weinberg started playing at the age of six. His first public appearance came at the age of seven when he sat in on a bar mitzvah band playing "When the Saints Go Marching In". The bandleader, Herbie Zane, was the leading act for bar mitzvahs and weddings in the area; he was impressed with young Weinberg and brought him along on other engagements as a kind of novelty act. Weinberg thus became a local child star, drumming in a three-piece mohair suit. He gained an appreciation for showmanship and was a fan of Liberace and Sammy Davis, Jr. He grew to idolize drummer Buddy Rich and become a fan of Gene Krupa and saw drummer Ed Shaughnessy of Doc Severinsen's band on The Tonight Show Starring Johnny Carson as having an ideal job as well as admiring the level of playing and serious sartorial style of the Tonight Show musicians. Weinberg stayed with Zane until junior high school and learned rhythms such as cha-chas, merengues, polkas, and the hora and playing everything from Dixieland jazz to Acker Bilk's "Stranger on the Shore".

Weinberg attended Temple Sharey Tefilo-Israel, a Reform Judaism congregation in South Orange, where he was inspired by a local rabbi and had what he later described as "a wonderful Jewish background." He would later say that the Jewish concept of seder, meaning order, became key to his vision of how a good drummer serves his band's music. Witnessing his father lose two summer camps in the Poconos impressed upon him the fragility of economic success and led to a strong work ethic. His father's financial setbacks also provided a reason for Weinberg to find steady work as a drummer, while still in his teens and attending high school, to help his family pay bills.

When the British Invasion hit in 1964, the Beatles and their drummer, Ringo Starr, became a major influence on Weinberg. He began playing in local New Jersey rock bands, playing the music of The Rolling Stones, Mitch Ryder and the Detroit Wheels, and The Young Rascals. While a member of the Epsilons, he played at the 1964 New York World's Fair. He attended Columbia High School in Maplewood; there he knew Leigh Howard Stevens, who would become a famous percussionist in his own right. Weinberg graduated from Columbia High in 1969. Another band he was in, Blackstone, recorded an eponymous album for Epic Records in 1970.

Weinberg first attended Adelphi University, and later Seton Hall University, majoring in film studies. His general goal was to become a lawyer, but he was still most viscerally interested in a music career and kept his drum set in his car in case any chances to play arose. He performed at weddings, bar mitzvahs, and bars, then landed a job in the pit band for the Broadway musical Godspell.

== Success with the E Street Band ==
Weinberg was still living at home when he met Bruce Springsteen on April 7, 1974, when his band, The Jim Marino Band, were Springsteen's support at Seton Hall. Springsteen had parted ways with his drummer, Vini "Mad Dog" Lopez, earlier that year, and the replacement, Ernest "Boom" Carter, lasted only six months before leaving with pianist David Sancious to form Tone. Weinberg answered a Springsteen Village Voice newspaper ad that famously requested, "no junior Ginger Bakers," in reference to Ginger Baker's reputation for long drum solos. Weinberg auditioned with Springsteen and the core E Street Band in mid-late August of that year at the SIR studios in Midtown Manhattan, bringing a minimalist drum kit with him consisting only of hi-hats, a snare drum and a bass drum. He knew one Springsteen song from the Marino band, "Sandy", and played it. His drumming on the Fats Domino song "Let the Four Winds Blow" sealed the position as his. A week later, he was offered the $110 per week job (US$718 in 2025 dollars), and he quit college immediately, about six academic credits short of a degree. Weinberg's first public performance came on September 19, 1974, at The Main Point in Bryn Mawr, Pennsylvania.

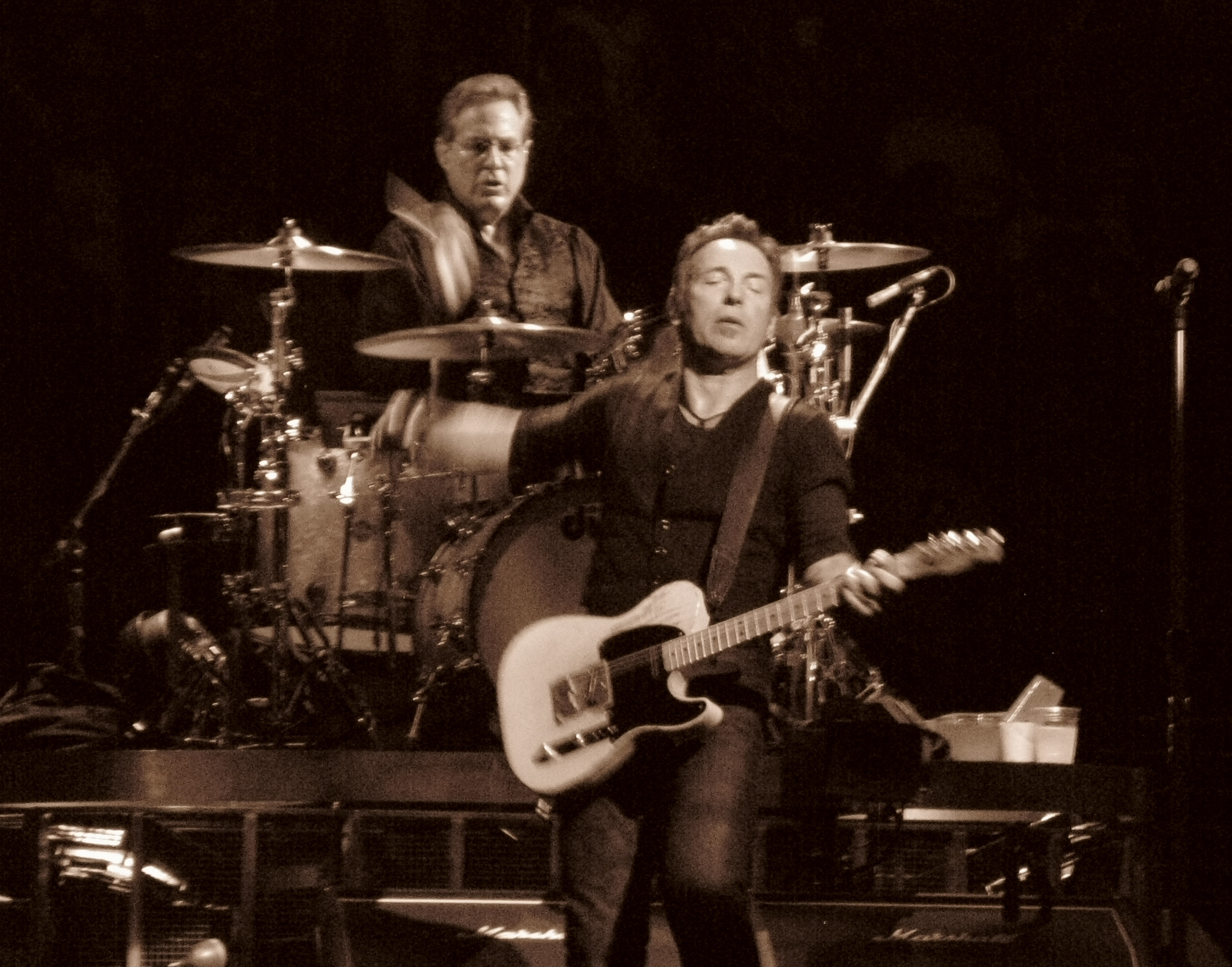
During his tenure with the E Street Band, Weinberg's gaze remains locked on Springsteen throughout each show.

Weinberg rose to success as the drummer for Springsteen's E Street Band, as his powerful yet controlled beat solved the E Street Band's drumming instabilities. On Born to Run (1975), Weinberg's drumming evoked two of his idols, Ringo Starr and Levon Helm, and he covered his snare drum with heavy paper towels to capture some of the Memphis soul sound. While travelling on tour, Weinberg became known for his exact requests, such as specifying the particular brand of paper towels to use for his drums or the standards for his hotel rooms. Weinberg never adopted the "rock and roll lifestyle"; he treated his music seriously and kept to the mantra, "Show up, do a good job, and give them more than their money's worth." One compromise Weinberg did have to make was sometimes playing on the High Holy Days. During shows, Springsteen built up the personas of his bandmates, and Weinberg was frequently referred to as "the Mighty Max". Weinberg started a long practice of keeping his eyes on Springsteen every moment during the show, even when Springsteen was behind the stage, as he never knew when Springsteen would change a tempo or suddenly deviate from the set list. Decades later, E Street guitarist Steve Van Zandt would say of Weinberg, "What nobody understands is that not only is Max a great drummer, Max reads Bruce's mind. You can't learn that." Weinberg bought a house overlooking the water in Atlantic Highlands, New Jersey, triggering a lifelong interest in real estate and home design.

Tempos slowed to an oft dirge-like pace on Darkness on the Edge of Town (1978); rehearsals and recording of the album stretched out over a long period, with Springsteen and bandmate and co-producer Steven Van Zandt experiencing a prolonged frustration over their inability to capture a more resonant drum sound. Weinberg soon regretted not playing faster on "Badlands", and tempos did speed up on that number and some others during the accompanying Darkness Tour. He did later say that "It was a ballsy thing to play a single stroke roll through the entirety of 'Candy's Room'" and that it was the kind of choice a session musician never would have tried.

Weinberg suffered an acknowledged "drumming slump" around 1980, and his time-keeping skills were criticized by Springsteen. What could pass unnoticed in concert became apparent on record, and Weinberg practiced drumming components for months in order to regain a fine sense of timing. Weinberg also suffered from repetitive stress injury and tendinitis, eventually requiring seven operations on his hands and wrists. He studied for a while with noted jazz drummer Joe Morello; Weinberg credited Morello for helping him to learn how to play with the tendinitis. Springsteen and the E Street Band's shows that opened New Jersey's Meadowlands Arena in 1981 as part of the River Tour became one of the highlights of Weinberg's career.

On June 22, 1981, Weinberg married Rebecca Schick, a Methodist who had grown up in Tinton Falls, New Jersey, and whom he had met through a mutual friend. Springsteen and the band played at their wedding, which was officiated by the same rabbi that Weinberg had while growing up. Becky Weinberg worked as a high school history teacher. They had two children, daughter Ali (born c. 1987) and son Jay (born 1990).

In 1984, they bought a 5-acre (2.0 ha) farm in Monmouth County; after feeling taken advantage of in the deal, Weinberg became a scrupulous researcher in real estate matters, often spending days at town halls looking over obscure zoning regulations. While on tour, he studied books about architecture, and dreamt of building houses in the style of Frank Lloyd Wright or Richard Meier.

Weinberg made a full recovery from his injuries in time for Born in the U.S.A. (1984), which featured an aerobics-timed beat on some tracks that also owed something to the popular Phil Collins drum sound. Weinberg's own experimentation since the Darkness days had also led to a more reverberant sound. Overall, Weinberg's more fluid drumming combined with Roy Bittan's use of synthesizers and better overall production to give Springsteen a more modern sound, resulting in the album becoming Springsteen's best-selling one ever and spawning a record-tying seven Top 10 hit singles. Springsteen later said of the album, "Max was the best thing on the record." Weinberg's most well-known drum part came on "Born in the U.S.A.", where his snare drum paired against Bittan's signature synthesizer riff on the opening and throughout the main part of the song. The recording then descends into improvised chaos; Springsteen had told Weinberg, "When I stop, keep the drums going." Upon the restart, intentional drum breakdowns matched bass swoops and guitar feedback; Springsteen subsequently said of the performance overall, "You can hear Max – to me, he was right up there with the best of them on that song." Weinberg said it was one of his most intense musical experiences.

On the subsequent Born in the U.S.A. Tour, Springsteen generally interspersed hard-rocking song sequences after every three or four numbers in order to give Weinberg's hands a chance to recover. Weinberg's wife Becky unintentionally triggered one of the tour's most celebrated episodes. She was a fan of the This Week with David Brinkley television program and invited panelist George Will to the Washington-area Capital Centre show. After seeing the band perform, Will became convinced that they were exemplars of hard-working patriotism and traditional American values; he wrote, "... consider Max Weinberg's bandaged fingers. The rigors of drumming have led to five tendonitis operations. He soaks his hands in hot water before a concert, in ice afterward, and sleeps with tight gloves on." Will further decided that Springsteen might endorse Ronald Reagan in the 1984 presidential campaign and talked to the campaign, which later led to Reagan's famous extolling of Springsteen at a stop in Hammonton, New Jersey, and Springsteen's subsequent negative response.

In 1984, Weinberg published The Big Beat: Conversations with Rock's Greatest Drummers, a series of interviews conducted over two years with drummers from various eras, including Starr, Helm, D. J. Fontana, Charlie Watts, Dino Danelli, Hal Blaine and others. The book captured drummers revealing more about their musical approaches than they normally did to the press and was thus considered an important addition to the rock literature. In 1986, Weinberg began taking a one-man show "Growing Up on E Street" to college campuses around the country. It contained some short films that Weinberg produced as well as a question-and-answer session.

For his efforts, Weinberg was named Best Drummer in the Playboy 1985 Pop and Jazz Music Poll and Best Drummer again in Rolling Stone's 1986 Critics Poll. The adulation got to him a bit as he aligned with the Mighty Max persona and went to fashionable parties.

Weinberg had a reduced role on Springsteen's 1987 album Tunnel of Love, replacing Springsteen's drum machine parts on a few tracks, but the full band was in place for the 1988 Tunnel of Love Express and Human Rights Now! tours. Weinberg called the latter tour's visiting of many third-world countries around the globe one of the most rewarding things the band had done.

Weinberg also played as a session musician, enjoying particular success in connection with songwriter and producer Jim Steinman. He drummed on the 1977 Meat Loaf album, Bat Out of Hell, playing on the Steinman-penned tracks "Bat Out of Hell", "You Took the Words Right Out of My Mouth" and "Paradise by the Dashboard Light". At a point in 1983, Weinberg was featured on the number one and number two songs on the Billboard Hot 100, Bonnie Tyler's "Total Eclipse of the Heart" and Air Supply's "Making Love Out of Nothing at All", both Steinman creations. Weinberg also recorded with Southside Johnny and the Asbury Jukes, Gary U.S. Bonds, Ian Hunter and Carole King.

On October 18, 1989, Springsteen unexpectedly called Weinberg to say he was dissolving the E Street Band. As Weinberg later said, "That's why they call him the Boss."

== Breakup and career choices ==
The news from Springsteen left Weinberg "a zombie for about six months". Even before the band's breakup, Weinberg had returned to school at Seton Hall University in early 1989. The band breakup occurred during his second semester at Seton Hall, on his way to completing the remaining 21 credits needed to obtain his bachelor's degree in communications. He graduated from there later in 1989. He then briefly attended Yeshiva University's Cardozo School of Law, but withdrew after six weeks. Weinberg asked Ringo Starr for advice on how to go on when the band that had made one's life had broken up. Weinberg and Springsteen remained on friendly terms during this period.

In 1990, Weinberg began offering motivational seminars oriented towards corporations to augment his one-person college show business. He received the HERO Award from Big Brothers Big Sisters of America in October 1990 for his work for that organization. The Big Beat was republished in 1991.

Weinberg thought his career as a musician was over and considered himself retired as a drummer. He went into the music business instead, joining a distribution company as a business partner. He worked as an executive for the Music Master label. He formed his own record company, Hard Ticket Entertainment, in 1990. In 1991, they issued an album that he produced by a group he formed, Killer Joe, called Scene of the Crime. He had sought out this career path because "I didn't want to continually be competing with 'Mighty Max'," but he found business life unfulfilling. Because of that, and for personal reasons as well, he needed to return to performing. Weinberg later reflected, "I felt at times, after the E Street Band broke up, so anonymous it was painful."

He looked through the Yellow Pages for jobs and played at bar mitzvahs for $125; he later said "[I] was glad to do it." Weinberg became the live drummer for 10,000 Maniacs in 1992 after their drummer Jerry Augustyniak was injured five days before a five-week tour. He went after that assignment once he heard it was open and later said, "I lived on a bus and had a roommate. Not exactly like the E Street Band, but I loved it. It reminded me that I am a drummer and I'm good. I was put here to play the drums. To turn my back on that ability was wrong." He played at the January 1993 inauguration of Bill Clinton. Weinberg auditioned in 1993 to be the principal drummer on the Broadway show The Who's Tommy, but was selected instead as the second substitute. Despite the very low pay, Weinberg was nevertheless happy: "I'd buried drumming so far into my psyche. I felt I'd resurrected it." Of Springsteen's work, Weinberg felt "that I would never get to play these songs again."

== Late Night with Conan O'Brien ==
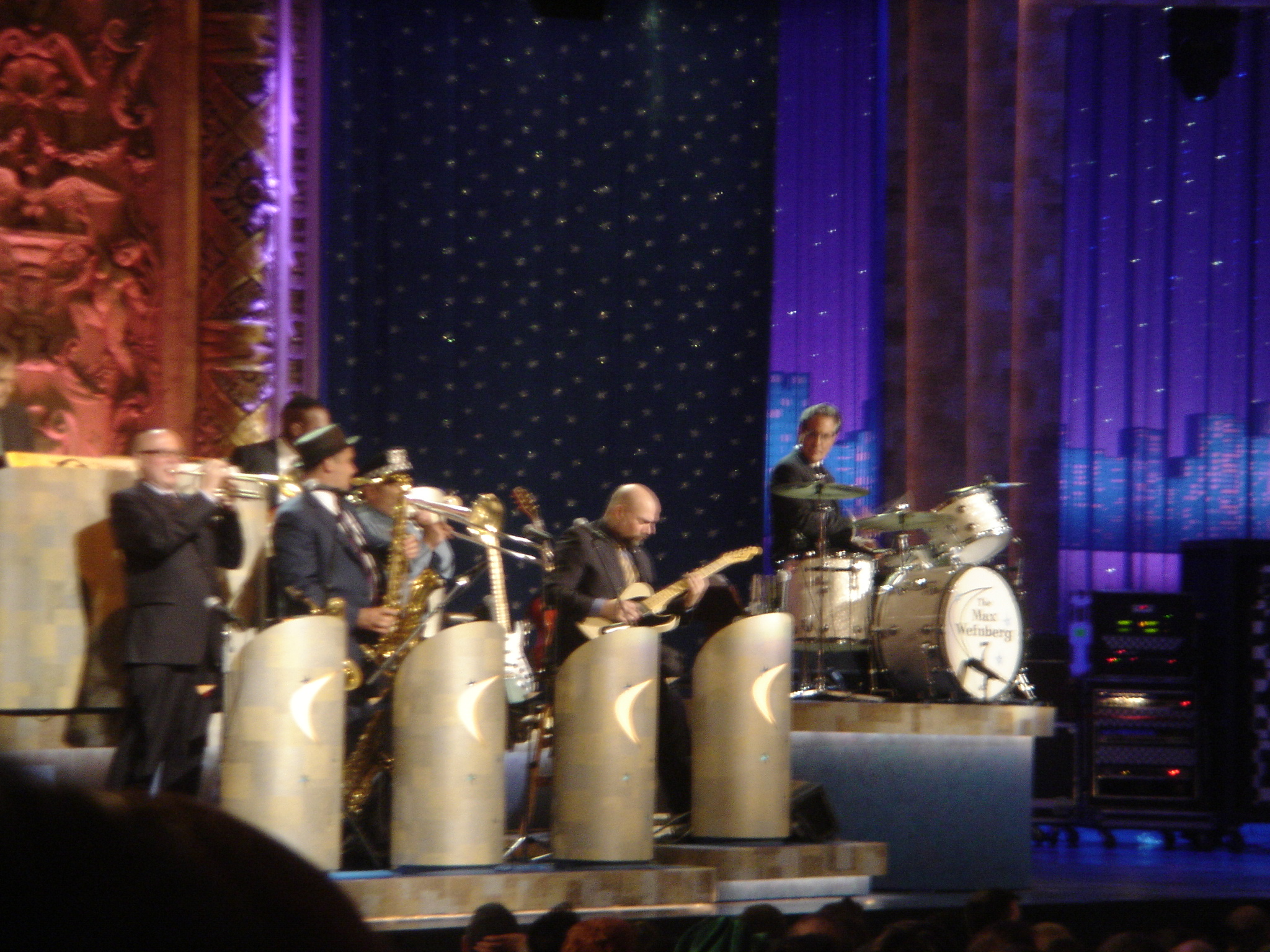
Weinberg leads The Max Weinberg 7 during a taping of Late Night with Conan O'Brien done on the road in Chicago in 2006.

In July 1993, Weinberg had a chance sidewalk meeting outside the Carnegie Deli with newly selected Late Night host Conan O'Brien, where Weinberg spoke about his ideas for music on the show. O'Brien promised Weinberg an audition. Within a few days, Weinberg put together the Max Weinberg 7, recruiting musicians he had worked with during his career, including on the Killer Joe project, starting with guitarist and arranger Jimmy Vivino. Weinberg decided a muscular, drums-driven jump blues vibe, partly derived from the Killer Joe sound, is what he would use as a starting point for the group's sound. At the early August audition, the outfit impressed O'Brien with their ability to play not just rock but also rhythm and blues, soul, jazz, pop, and big band swing; Weinberg was so anxious to land the job that he threw up afterward. After a final meeting with executive producer Lorne Michaels, they were hired as the house band. The band performed on the show every night since its premiere on September 13, 1993. O'Brien later said of the Weinberg choice, "The energy and enthusiasm of his music coincided with the show I wanted to do. Plus, his tan offset my ghostly complexion." Weinberg held the title of music director on the show, while Vivino did most of the arranging. Of his career rebound, Weinberg said simply: "I grabbed the brass ring twice."

In the early phases of the show, Weinberg was involved in occasional comedy bits, but mostly focused on his musical responsibilities, including the selection of walk-on music for guests. The band got a 30-second featured spot each night after O'Brien's opening monologue. O'Brien often received poor notices during the early years of Late Night, and Jon Pareles of The New York Times pronounced the Max Weinberg 7 as the "saving grace" of the show. Weinberg established an image by dressing in high-quality suits and a tie; he said, "I like us to look sharp and play sharp," and "I don't want to look like the audience, I want to look different." Weinberg became a television celebrity, and his visibility and stature grew from Late Night and established an image for him beyond Springsteen. Indeed, much of the show's young fan base, and some of the staff on the show itself, were unaware of Weinberg's past role in the E Street Band.

In 1994, Rhino Records released Max Weinberg Presents: Let There Be Drums, a three-volume set of CDs that highlighted drumming that Weinberg admired on songs from the 1950s through the 1970s. Recaps in 1998 of the first five years of Late Night concluded that the band had been an important element in the show surviving, with Weinberg's personality providing a foil to O'Brien's and with "the Max Weinberg 7 [leaving] television viewers wishing they were in the studio to hear more." Their sound also fit into the swing revival going on during the late 1990s.

In 2000, O'Brien sidekick Andy Richter left the show, and Weinberg became the "second banana". Weinberg continued to present an obvious visual foil: as O'Brien said, "If you looked at this guy you would never know he was the drummer in a huge rock 'n' roll band. You would say he was the guy who did the band's accounting. But Max is the authoritative, buttoned-down adult in the midst of all this madness." Weinberg reveled in O'Brien's youthful audience: "To be 49 and appreciated by 14-year-olds again? What a thrill!" Weinberg engaged in stare-downs with O'Brien and gave scripted screeds about newsmakers. Additionally, Weinberg was comically presented as a twisted character with sexual fetishes and homicidal tendencies in comedy bits. When O'Brien was host of Saturday Night Live on March 10, 2001, his monologue featured a visit from the SNL studio to the Late Night studio (only a few floors apart in the same building, 30 Rockefeller Plaza), where O'Brien discovers Weinberg engaged in sexual intercourse on his desk with a woman played by Max's real-life wife, Becky. Weinberg says of his comic persona: "[I]t's playing against type. I've been happily married for nearly 30 years, with two wonderful children. It's not what I portray on the show, and that's funny." Weinberg continued his one-man college shows, now titled E Street to Late Night: Dreams Found, Lost, and Found Again.

Weinberg returned to the E Street Band briefly when Springsteen re-grouped the band in early 1995 to record a few new songs for the Greatest Hits release. The regrouping was only temporary and the band returned to inactivity. Also in 1995, Weinberg drummed on two of Johnnie Johnson's songs: "I'm Mad" and "She Called Me Out of My Name", on Johnson's 1995 album Johnnie Be Back. Weinberg spent two years building an 8,900-square-foot (830 m^{2}) house in Middletown Township, New Jersey, that they moved into in 1999; he picked up many of the furnishings for it from locations around the world during subsequent tours.

The Max Weinberg 7 released a self-titled album in 2000 on Hip-O Records; Weinberg said he waited until then because "I wanted to change my style of playing and hone my style before I committed to a record." He was especially proud that the band had successfully backed Tony Bennett during a late 1990s appearance on Late Night: "Two years ago if you'd asked me if I could play with Tony Bennett, I would have said absolutely not. I'm not in his league. But we played with him the other night, and it was wonderful. We swung."

== Reformation of the E Street Band ==
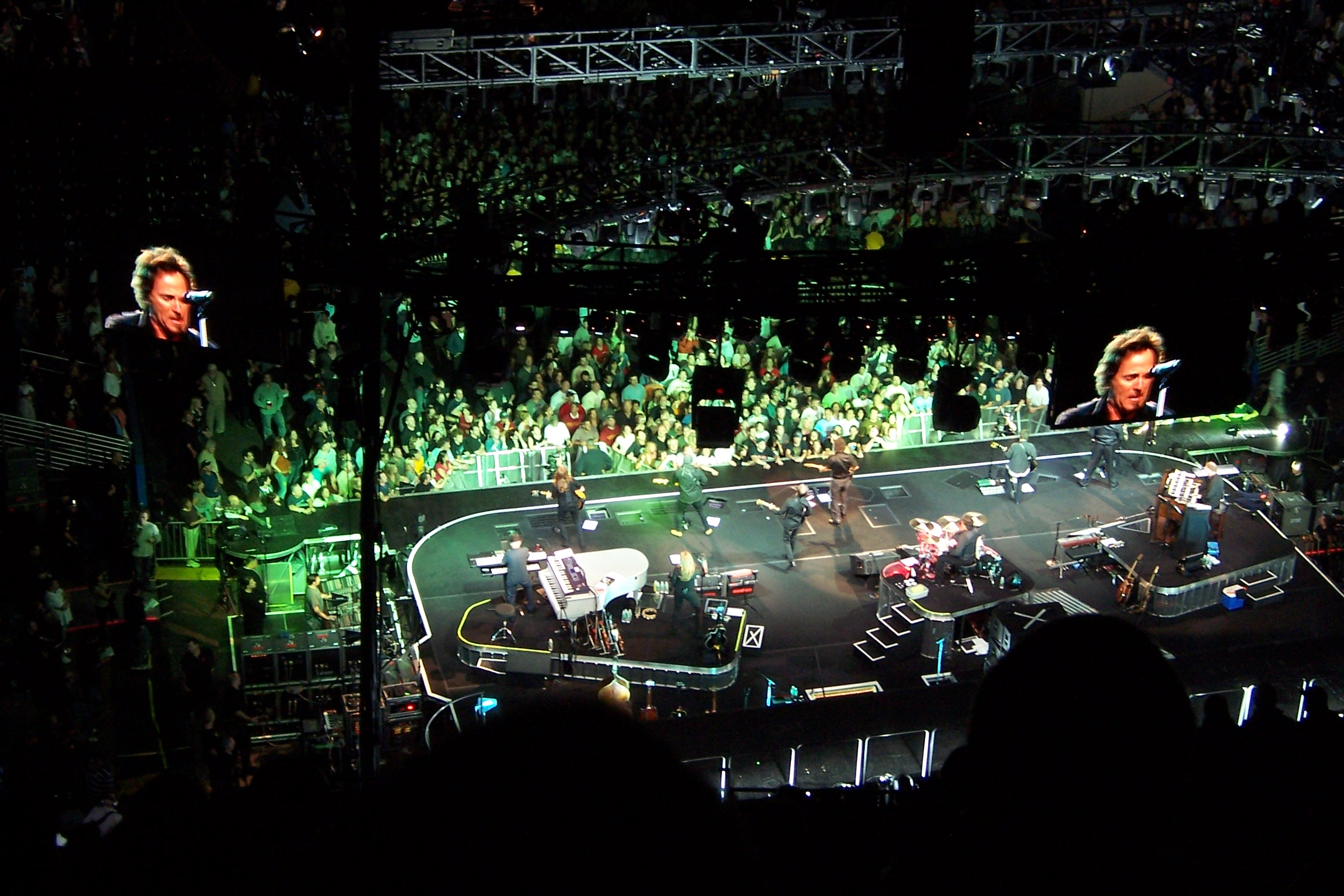
Weinberg behind the drums as "Radio Nowhere" opens the Magic Tour at Hartford Civic Center in 2007.

Springsteen reunited the E Street Band in 1999 on a more lasting basis, for the Bruce Springsteen and the E Street Band Reunion Tour. This posed a dilemma for Weinberg, whose greater loyalty was to O'Brien and NBC. Indeed, up until then Weinberg had never missed a Late Night show, appearing in over 1,000 in a row. However, allowing Weinberg to tour for one of the highest-profile reunions in rock history was thought to be of long-term benefit to the television show's appeal, and an arrangement was worked out wherein Weinberg took a leave of absence from Late Night in order to go out on this and subsequent tours. When he was tied up with Springsteen, drummer James Wormworth took his place, and the band was led by Jimmy Vivino ("Jimmy Vivino and the Max Weinberg 7"). When the Reunion Tour was extended in length, shows were generally restricted to weekends, so as to permit Weinberg to fulfill his Late Night responsibilities. At NBC, the coexistence between the drummer's two bosses was known as the Weinberg-Springsteen Rule, and was not typically extended to other talent at the network.

While Weinberg did not forget the breakup and long separation, he viewed it as "at the same time the most horrifying experience I've ever been through and the most liberating." In any case, he immediately felt comfortable playing with Springsteen once more: "Right from the first downbeat of the first rehearsal, it was there again." His drumming for the E Street Band was more relaxed and mature than before, showing more confidence and finesse, and his hands and fingers were in better shape for having done the daily Late Night work. When the tour concluded with ten shows at New York's Madison Square Garden, on several days Weinberg taped the Conan show at Rockefeller Center in the late afternoon, put his hands in ice and changed from his suit into jeans and a vest, and played with Springsteen at night. The experience of doing both left him "professionally speaking, as alive as I've ever felt." Of his position on the drum platform behind Springsteen, he says, "I have the best seat in the house." His energy level was no less, as he could be seen jumping a foot off his seat during some songs. His daughter Ali joined the band on keyboards several times during the tour.

Weinberg's steady drumming helped power Springsteen's 2002 comeback album, and the first E Street Band studio recording in 18 years, The Rising. Weinberg took more time off from the Conan show to participate in the long and successful 2002–2003 Rising Tour. In the early 2000s, Weinberg was at the center of annual holiday benefit shows at Asbury Park Convention Hall, billed as Bruce Springsteen, the Max Weinberg 7 and Friends.

Weinberg was a member of the board of trustees of the Monmouth Conservation Foundation and won a conservation award in 2002. Nevertheless, during 2002 and 2003, he got into a prolonged local controversy over his plans to subdivide a portion of his 65-acre (26 ha) Middletown Township, New Jersey, property into lots for new homes. Some of his neighbors strongly protested the move, and they and some in the press accused him of hypocrisy; Weinberg defended himself by saying the conservation foundation was not against all development, just thoughtless development. A scaled-down version of the plan was approved by the town's zoning board, and in 2008 Weinberg went ahead with plans to sell the lots. Weinberg generally avoids political comments, but did campaign for John Kerry in the 2004 United States presidential election.

Springsteen himself also made appearances on Late Night in 1999, 2002, and 2006. Weinberg participated in the 2004 Vote for Change tour then drummed on Springsteen's 2007 album Magic. There, he was part of a core rhythm section comprising himself, Springsteen, bassist Garry Tallent, and pianist Roy Bittan, who did the tracks first; other members' contributions were added later. Weinberg then took more time off from the Conan show to do the 2007–2008 Magic Tour. Weinberg repeated his role in the core section in recording Springsteen's Working on a Dream album. Weinberg also fulfilled a long-time dream by going to Super Bowl XLIII in February 2009 with Springsteen and the E Street Band's half-time performance, where he was joined by some of the other members of the Max Weinberg 7.

== Move to The Tonight Show ==
The ending of the O'Brien Late Night and beginning of The Tonight Show coincided with the start of Springsteen and the E Street Band's 2009 Working on a Dream Tour. O'Brien told a Variety reporter at the time of the announcement that he hoped that Weinberg would follow him to Los Angeles and that he also hoped an arrangement could be worked out to let Weinberg go on the road with Springsteen as had been done for past tours.

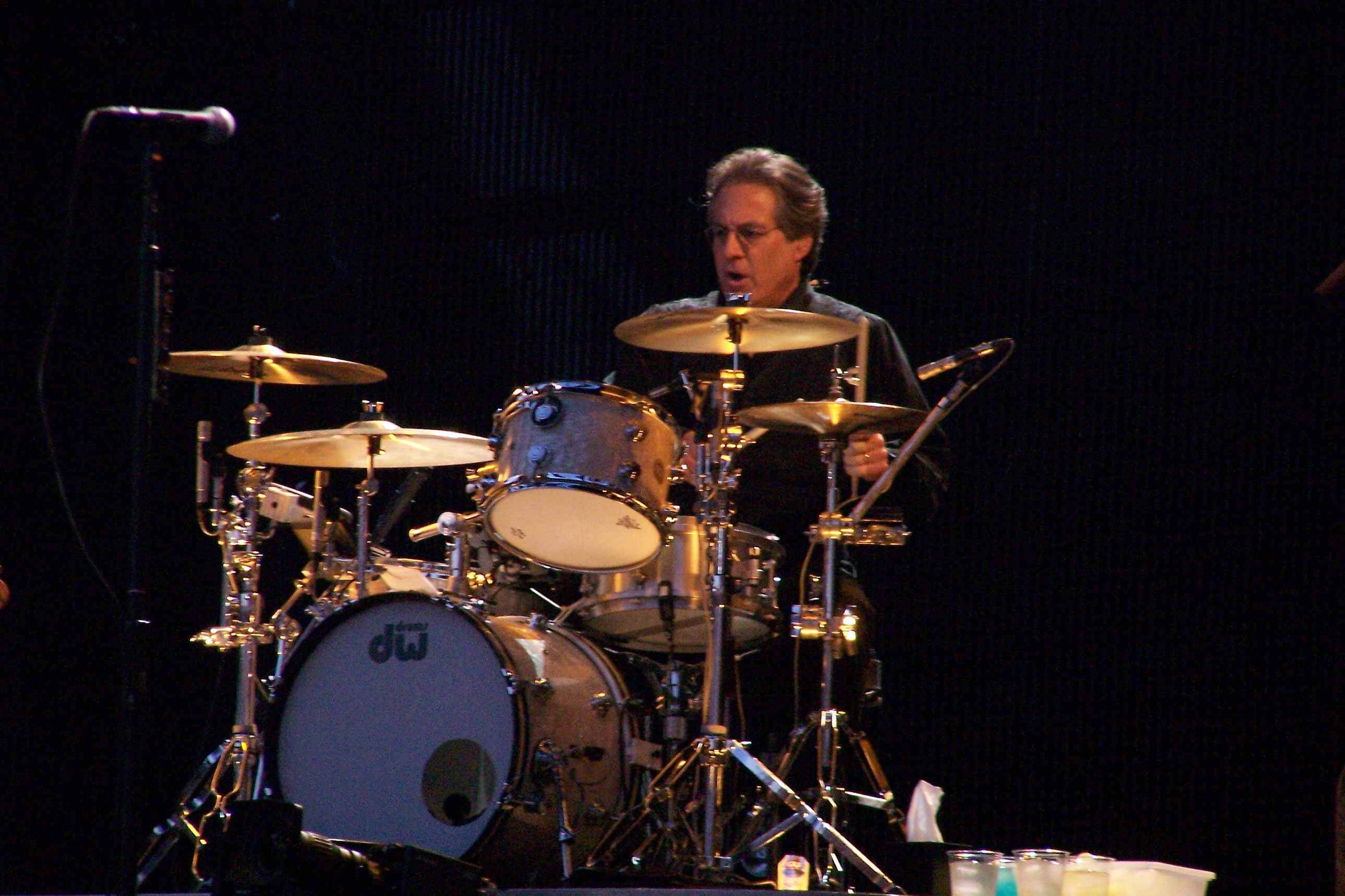
Weinberg performing in Valladolid, Spain on August 1, 2009, during one of the portions of the Working on a Dream Tour that he could attend.

Whether Weinberg would stay with O'Brien and move or not became a subject of conflicting news reports. Nevertheless, O'Brien confirmed on February 18, 2009, that Weinberg and the band were indeed coming with him. Weinberg had not missed an E Street Band show since joining the outfit in 1974, and E Streeter Van Zandt said that no amount of rehearsal by another drummer could replace Weinberg's "intuitive understanding" of Springsteen's performance gambits.

The conflict was resolved when son Jay became a substitute drummer for his father during parts of the Working on a Dream Tour that Max could not make due to commitments to the O'Brien show. Springsteen said, "Once again, I want to express my appreciation to Conan O'Brien, and everyone on his team, for making it possible for Max to continue to do double duty for both us and for him. We promise to return him in one piece." The younger Weinberg began playing during segments of the tour's shows, and got a very positive response from audiences and reviewers as a spark plug for the band. Max Weinberg said Jay's segments allowed him a "total out-of-body experience. For the first time in – I've been with Bruce for 35 years – I've been able to go out in the audience and enjoy a Bruce Springsteen and the E Street Band concert." In one case, Jay did one show of a two-night stand on the East Coast and Max then took a red-eye flight back from Los Angeles to do the second.

The Tonight Show with Conan O'Brien premiered on June 1, 2009, with the Max Weinberg 7 now expanded to eight and referred to as Max Weinberg and the Tonight Show Band. Andy Richter was back as an announcer, making Weinberg's role as a foil a little uncertain. Gradually, Weinberg and the band's roles in the comic aspects of the show began to assert themselves. On June 25, Weinberg departed The Tonight Show temporarily for four weeks to join Springsteen and band part-way through their European leg; this was conveyed on the show via a comedy bit that had his drum riser turn into a float that took him outside the studio and purportedly to the airport. Weinberg returned to the show on August 3, after flying back from a Springsteen show that had ended early into the same morning in Spain. Of being Tonight Show bandleader, he said, "I think one of the biggest thrills in my life was seeing my name in the same sentence as Doc Severinsen, who, in my view, is the gold standard for 'Tonight Show' bandleaders. There's never been anyone who did it quite near the class and the brilliance of Doc Severinsen in the original Tonight Show Band. I used to think when I was a kid what a great job that must be – you know, same place, every time, everyday. Lo and behold, here I am 40 years later, doing it. That sounds deep, deep, deep, deep, deeply satisfying to me." On September 25, Weinberg left The Tonight Show again for two months to join Springsteen and band for the final, American portion of the Working on a Dream Tour. The same drum-riser-to-float comedy bit was used, except this time the float was "hit" and demolished by a truck just outside the studio (and airing of the segment was delayed a few days due to O'Brien legitimately injuring himself during the same show). The tour wrapped on November 22, 2009, in Buffalo, New York; Weinberg was back on The Tonight Show the next day. With no E Street Band projects in sight for at least the next year or two, Weinberg was left to concentrate on his bandleader role.

Even though Weinberg was living in Los Angeles for The Tonight Show, he retained his home in New Jersey and considered that his permanent residence: "I'm not really moving. I'm living out here, but it's more like an extended road trip." Regarding his decision to stay in music rather than pursue the legal profession, he has had no regrets: "The world needs more drummers and fewer lawyers."

However, Weinberg's stint as Tonight Show bandleader was not to last long. The 2010 Tonight Show host and timeslot conflict erupted, and after an intense period of public turmoil, the last O'Brien show took place on January 22, 2010, finishing with Weinberg propelling a guest-filled seriocomic rendition of "Free Bird". While O'Brien negotiated a settlement deal with NBC for himself and his staff, Weinberg as well as Richter had to reach their own agreements with the network.

== Departure from O'Brien and start of own bands ==
In February 2010, Weinberg underwent a twelve-hour open heart valve repair surgery to correct a condition he had known about and had been monitoring since the mid-1980s. His recovery took place over three to five months, and Weinberg kept news about the operation private until an interview eight months later.

In April 2010, O'Brien began his The Legally Prohibited from Being Funny on Television Tour. While the rest of the group was part of the tour under the moniker The Legally Prohibited Band, Weinberg was not (except for a brief appearance at one show). Instead, he assembled and staged appearances by the Max Weinberg Big Band, a fifteen-piece ensemble with twelve horns that mostly plays the music of Frank Sinatra, Buddy Rich, Count Basie, and Maynard Ferguson. Weinberg's interest in the genre dated back to his childhood and the artists he had seen on televised variety shows.

It was initially unknown whether Weinberg would be part of O'Brien's new late night show on TBS that began in November 2010, as no specifics had been worked out for that show while O'Brien focused on his tour. In June 2010, the Max Weinberg Big Band Tour began with a show in Red Bank, New Jersey's Count Basie Theater. Weinberg said that he was booking appearances by his big band through 2011 and that with regard to O'Brien, "I literally have not thought about it. There have been no discussions. It's kind of an open question."

In September 2010, it was announced Weinberg would not be part of the show, now named Conan; Jimmy Vivino took over leadership of that band, with Wormworth replacing Weinberg full-time on drums. The split was stated as being mutual, with O'Brien saying, "Max has been a huge part of my life for the past 17 years and he is an incredible bandleader and musician," and Weinberg thanking his band and saying, "17 years – a lifetime on TV ... my association with Conan, his staff, and crew has been a deeply rewarding experience for me." Weinberg subsequently acknowledged that "we both wanted to go in different directions," but both looked forward to Weinberg occasionally stopping by to sit in on the new show. Weinberg said his health was better than ever but that the "life-changing experience emotionally and spiritually" of the surgery, a desire to remain in New Jersey with his family, and an interest in exploring new musical directions had all played a role in his departure from O'Brien.

Another health scare happened in June 2011 when he was diagnosed with prostate cancer. He had surgery for it the following month with a favorable outcome, but did not reveal publicly the news of this health situation for another six years.

In 2013, Weinberg again found himself in a real estate dispute, threatening legal action against Monmouth County in connection with its attempt to repair damage to the Henry Hudson Trail in Atlantic Highlands following damage caused by Superstorm Sandy. Weinberg claimed that the work done in creating that portion of the trail, augmented by Sandy, had caused significant damage to two properties he and his wife owned there. The issue was still ongoing in 2014.

Weinberg played on only a couple of tracks on Springsteen's March 2012 album Wrecking Ball, but resumed his normal role with the E Street Band on the subsequent 2012–2013 Wrecking Ball Tour, this time augmented by percussionist Everett Bradley, as well as on its 2014 continuation, the High Hopes Tour. In 2014, Weinberg was inducted into the Rock and Roll Hall of Fame as a member of the E Street Band. He said of the honor, "when you have that trophy in your hands, I've never experienced anything like that. ... You're walking around with this big heavy symbolic recognition of the work you've done." Meanwhile, he continued to play in a jazz idiom on his own, now with the Max Weinberg Quintet. In late October 2014, Weinberg sat in for a surprise guest appearance on Conan. In early 2015, Weinberg received the Humanitarian of the Year Award from Temple Rodeph Torah in Marlboro, New Jersey, in recognition of his volunteering in association with multiple local groups; he said he was humbled to be accepting an award that focused on tikkun olam.

Weinberg once again hit the road with Springsteen and the E Street Band for the River Tour in January 2016, which in its various phases lasted until February 2017. He appreciated the shows on the first leg of the tour, where they played the entire 20-song The River album in sequence, because "when you play something night after night you really get to dig into the material, just as an instrumentalist." He attributed his ability to keep playing during some of the longest shows in E Street Band history to his keeping in top physical condition, including exercise by swimming, and to his love of playing with Springsteen.

Once the tour was over, Weinberg said he would continue to appear with his various own bands, including doing weddings and bar and bat mitzvahs just as he had earlier in his career. He also liked to watch his son Jay play with Slipknot, although he conceded he did so from a safe zone where he would not get knocked down by the audience.

On December 14, 2021, Max Weinberg indicated that he felt a tour with Springsteen and the E Street Band was very likely in 2022 saying "Until the bus pulls up at my house, figuratively speaking, I'm not quite sure but I'm pretty convinced ... (that) myself, my colleagues and the people who are interested are going to be very pleasantly surprised in 2022. I don't make plans for Bruce Springsteen and the E Street Band but I feel very good about the next 18, 24 months."

== Equipment ==
For many years, Weinberg's gear included Slingerland Drums, Ludwig, Pearl Drums and Zildjian cymbals; he subsequently switched to DW Drums, but continues to use Zildjian cymbals. He also uses Remo heads and, previously having used Regal Tip drumsticks and brushes, he now uses Vater drumsticks, notably the 5A Nude wood tip model and Wire Tap brushes. His setup has always been simple, mostly consisting of a snare drum, mounted tom, bass drum and floor tom, while his usual cymbal setup consists of two crash cymbals, a ride cymbal and a pair of hi-hats, with an occasional third crash: "I've got four drums. Anything more is redundant. Besides, I tend to trip over things."

== Personal life ==
As of July 2020, Weinberg and his wife Becky live in Delray Beach, Florida. Among his valued possessions is the conga drum given to him by his father in 1957. During a 2020 interview with The Wall Street Journal, when asked why he still looks forward to touring with Springsteen, Weinberg said, "A chance to prove I still have it. Playing with Bruce and the E Street Band is the height of what I do."

Weinberg keeps strong ties to his native New Jersey. He and his family are fans of the New Jersey Devils, and played ice hockey on the 2-acre (0.81 ha) pond in front of their house. They were season ticket holders for the Devils until the children became too old and busy to attend games.

Weinberg's son Jay became a drummer as a teenager for local punk rock and metal bands without much instruction from his father but using Max's old gear. From 2015 to 2023, he was the drummer of the nu metal band Slipknot. Max's daughter Ali is a journalist, starting as an assistant to NBC News reporter Chuck Todd and later appearing on the MSNBC.com blog First Read. As of 2023, Ali is a foreign affairs producer for the PBS News Hour. Weinberg played drums on the first album recorded by his sister Nancy Winston, a professional pianist and singer in New York City, known for her regular appearances at Cafe Pierre.

== Tours with Bruce Springsteen ==
- Born to Run tours, 1974–1977
- Darkness Tour, 1978–1979
- The River Tour, 1980–1981
- Born in the U.S.A. Tour, 1984–1985
- Tunnel of Love Express Tour, 1988
- Human Rights Now! Amnesty International Tour, 1988
- Reunion Tour, 1999–2000
- The Rising Tour, 2002–2003
- Vote for Change Tour, 2004
- Magic Tour, 2007–2008
- Working on a Dream Tour, 2009
- Wrecking Ball World Tour, 2012–2013
- High Hopes Tour, 2014
- River Tour/Oceania '17, 2016–2017
- Springsteen and E Street Band 2023–2025 Tour, 2023–2025

Media offices
Preceded by Paul Shaffer	Late Night bandleader September 13, 1993 – February 20, 2009	Succeeded by Questlove
Preceded by Kevin Eubanks	The Tonight Show bandleader June 1, 2009 – January 22, 2010	Succeeded by Kevin Eubanks
