= Bruce Springsteen with the Seeger Sessions Band Tour =

2006 concert tour by Bruce Springsteen and the Sessions Band

- Tour by Bruce Springsteen with the Sessions Band
- Associated album: We Shall Overcome: The Seeger Sessions
- Start date: April 20, 2006
- End date: November 21, 2006
- Legs: 3
- No. of shows: 62

Bruce Springsteen with the Sessions Band concert chronology
- Devils & Dust Tour (2005); Seeger Sessions Band Tour (2006); Magic Tour (2007)

The Bruce Springsteen with the Seeger Sessions Band Tour, afterward sometimes referred to simply as the Sessions Band Tour, was a 2006 concert tour featuring Bruce Springsteen and the Sessions Band playing what was billed as "An all-new evening of gospel, folk, and blues", otherwise seen as a form of big band folk music. The tour was an outgrowth of the approach taken on Springsteen's We Shall Overcome: The Seeger Sessions album, which featured folk music songs written or made popular by activist folk musician Pete Seeger, but taken to an even greater extent.

== Itinerary ==
The tour began on April 20, 2006, with the first of four rehearsal shows at Asbury Park Convention Hall as well as a promotional appearance there on ABC's Good Morning America. Then came a successful performance before a non-Springsteen crowd at the New Orleans Jazz & Heritage Festival on April 30, in a city still recovering from the effects of Hurricane Katrina; Springsteen voiced discontent over government handling of the aftermath of Katrina, much to the satisfaction of the handkerchief-waving audience.

The tour's first proper leg then began in May with 10 regular concerts and one special television concert in Western Europe; the first was at the Point Depot in Dublin on May 5. A return to the United States for the second leg saw 18 concerts from late May to late June, ending at the PNC Bank Arts Center in Holmdel, New Jersey, on June 25.

Springsteen said in various languages during the latter stages of the European leg of the tour, "See you in the fall!" Accordingly, the tour's third leg consisted of 27 shows in Europe again, during October and November. This leg was sometimes dubbed The American Land Tour 2006, after a new Springsteen song that was being played as well as the We Shall Overcome: The Seeger Sessions – American Land Edition reissue of the album. It began on October 1 at the PalaMalaguti in Bologna, Italy, and concluded on November 21, 2006, at the Odyssey Arena in Belfast, Northern Ireland. No further American shows took place.

== The show ==
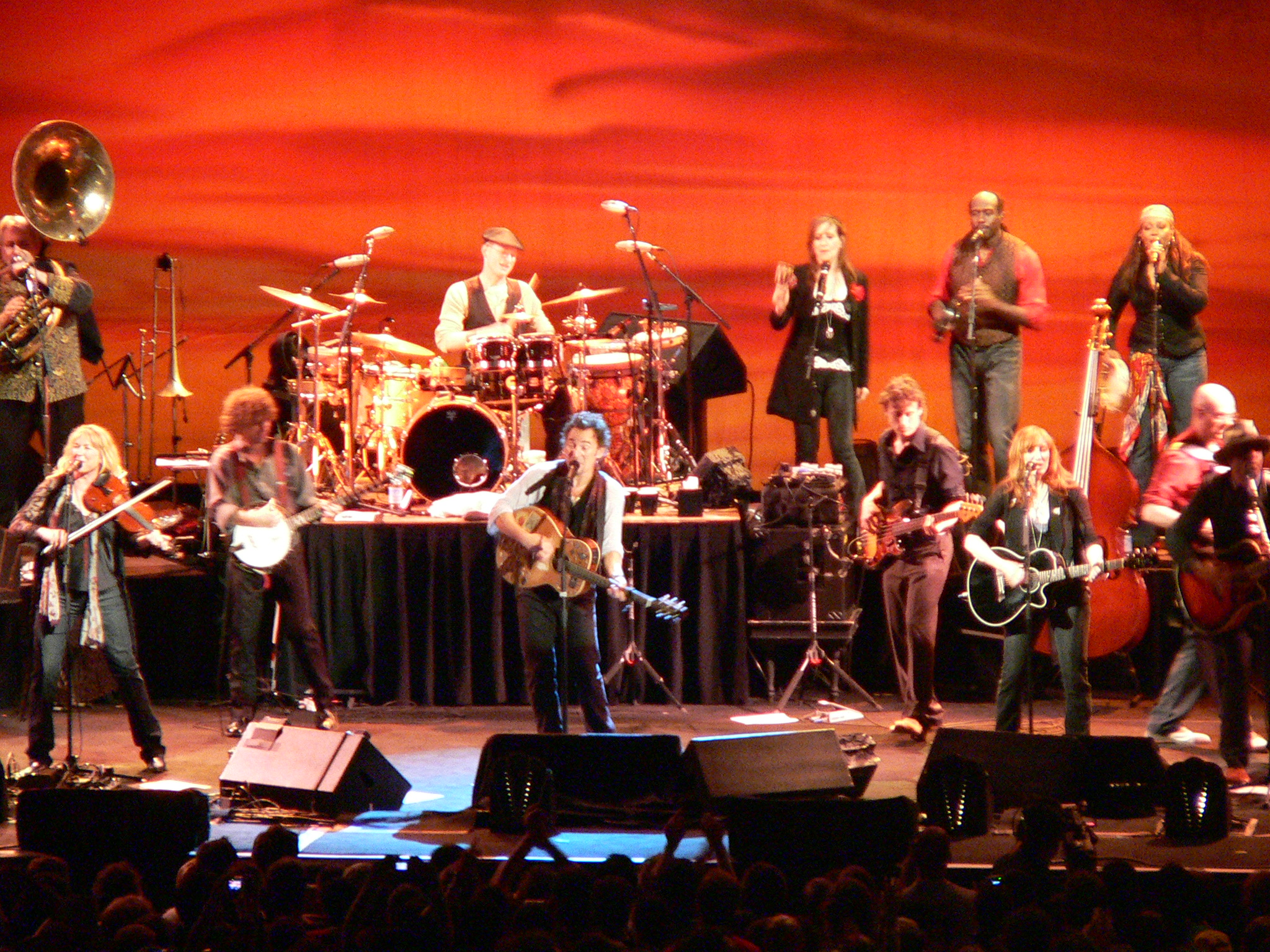
Springsteen and the band performing at the Fila Forum, Milan, Italy, on May 12, 2006. This was considered by fans to be one of the best shows of the first leg of the tour.

Material from the Seeger Sessions album dominated the set list of the 2½ hour shows. Especially in the numbers played first, such as "John Henry" and "O Mary Don't You Weep", the typically 18-strong band put up a huge sound, with a four-acoustic-guitar-led rhythm section creating a strong beat, punctuated by plenty of violin, banjo, and trumpet solos as well as multiple false endings. Audience participation was encouraged for the later "My Oklahoma Home" ("Blown away!") and sing-songey "Pay Me My Money Down", while "Jacob's Ladder" was musically illustrated by three or four key changes. The San Francisco Chronicle wrote, "[Springsteen] used every trick in the trade to make these 100-year-old songs sound bigger than life."

To these album numbers Springsteen added more songs from the same cloth, such as Seeger's "Bring 'Em Home" (cast towards the Iraq War rather than the original Vietnam) and Blind Alfred Reed's "How Can a Poor Man Stand Such Times and Live?" (with Springsteen writing new verses regarding New Orleans and Katrina).

On the first two legs, Springsteen also played from four to eight of his own songs per show. A few were straightforward versions of recent material, such as "Devils & Dust", "Long Time Comin'", and "My City of Ruins". Others were drastically re-arranged takes on old material, such as "Atlantic City", "If I Should Fall Behind" (changed into waltz time), and "Ramrod". The most remarked upon of these was Nebraska's "Open All Night", whose already surreal lyrics about New Jersey's industrial landscape were brought to the level of a "showstopping rave-up" by being rapped against a big band swing arrangement and a pseudo-Andrews Sisters female backing vocal trio.

On the third, European leg, the enormous reception the band had received earlier in the year was not lost in the larger shows, and with Springsteen's arrangements of over ten of his original works into folk-like performances to add to the ever-expanding repertoire of Seeger-influenced songs. "The Seeger Sessions Band [was] no longer the ragtag collection of fine individual players they were some months ago, but a tight unit here toward the end of the tour — a band", Backstreets.com reported. The shows were seen by many to be among Springsteen's absolute best. Late in the American leg, he had debuted the Irish jig-styled "American Land", which now closed many of the European shows. On November 11 at Wembley Arena, the band debuted a new Springsteen composition titled "A Long Walk Home", which was a ballad about the current state of American politics, which a special comments about the just-completed mid-term elections having restored "some semblance of sanity" to the country.

== Commercial and critical reaction ==
Both the album and the tour proved more popular in Europe than in the U.S. The first sign of domestic weakness came when the local Asbury Park rehearsal shows, placed in the very heart of Springsteen fandom, were not full; in the past, these had been extremely difficult tickets to get. European shows, on the other hand, did very well, with for example shows in London, Manchester, and Amsterdam all selling out in ten minutes or less. Some of Springsteen's most devoted fans were now overseas, and Milan and Barcelona provided especially fervent crowds, some of whom were mass singing the new album's songs even before the show started.

When the shows returned to the United States for the second leg, however, mediocre or poor ticket sales became quite noticeable; PopMatters talked of "the bizarre alternate universe that has swallowed Springsteen's strangely under-attended summer tour ... Rambling along languidly in almost clandestine fashion, it may take the prize for the Worst-Pitched Concert of the Summer." The shows were mostly booked in outdoor amphitheatres, and lawn areas as well as sections of seats were often deserted. Springsteen commented to the sparse crowd in Columbus, Ohio, "We are not great in numbers, but we are mighty!" The Indianapolis venue saw a "yawning green lawn (empty as it was)." A Milwaukee area venue, already cut down in size, was only about half full. For a show outside Chicago, the Chicago Tribune reported that "Springsteen faced a sea of empty seats ... The 11,000-seat pavilion was barely half full, and the 17,000-capacity lawn was barren."

Yet despite attendance woes, the U.S. shows received almost universal praise from critics and concert-goers. While they were without the E Street Band and did not include any of Springsteen's biggest hits such as "Born to Run", fans were consistently kept on their feet singing along.

David Hinckley of the New York Daily News wrote of the tour, "In Saratoga Monday night, Springsteen kept a full house on its feet pretty much the whole show. No one left wishing for 'Born to Run'." Joan Anderman of The Boston Globe said that the "homespun symphony of accordions and fiddles, pedal steel guitars, and joyful voices was filled with the irrepressible spirit that's the very essence of folk music." Dan Barry of The New York Times, writing as an old folk music follower, described how "music exploded from the stage: rock and bluegrass, jig and reel, spiritual and swing, honky-tonk and acoustic blues ... he raised his audience up with old songs and spirituals that he had infused with rocking urgency, then toyed with so that brass and guitar could harmonize, an accordionist could jam with the Boss, and a tuba player could know rock-concert adulation." The Chicago Tribune review quoted above went on to say, "The no-show Springsteen faithful missed a good one." Newsday said the show had both high points and stumbles. And Reuters' Erik Pederson wrote that even "without 'Born to Run' et al., this was Springsteen at his best – delivering impassioned, interactive, socially conscious music while never failing to entertain."

Explanations for the poor U.S. attendance varied, including two straight records without the E Street Band, aftereffects from the morose solo Devils & Dust Tour the year before, and backlash from the political stances of the Vote for Change tour the year before that. The most common reason offered was the title association with banjo-picking Pete Seeger, and the consequent (mistaken) impression that this tour was going to be dour folk music. As PopMatters said, "At first the idea of enduring a folk-powered evening of Pete Seeger songs made me want to sprint home and smooch my copy of Born in the U.S.A. ... And that's why this Seeger business is such an out-of-left-field surprise: against all odds, it's fantastically fun. Seeger's name is on the ticket, sure, but in Springsteen's hands the music gets an enormous, big-band, horn-powered treatment that can only be explained with commas: gospel, blues, folk, rock, and zydeco."

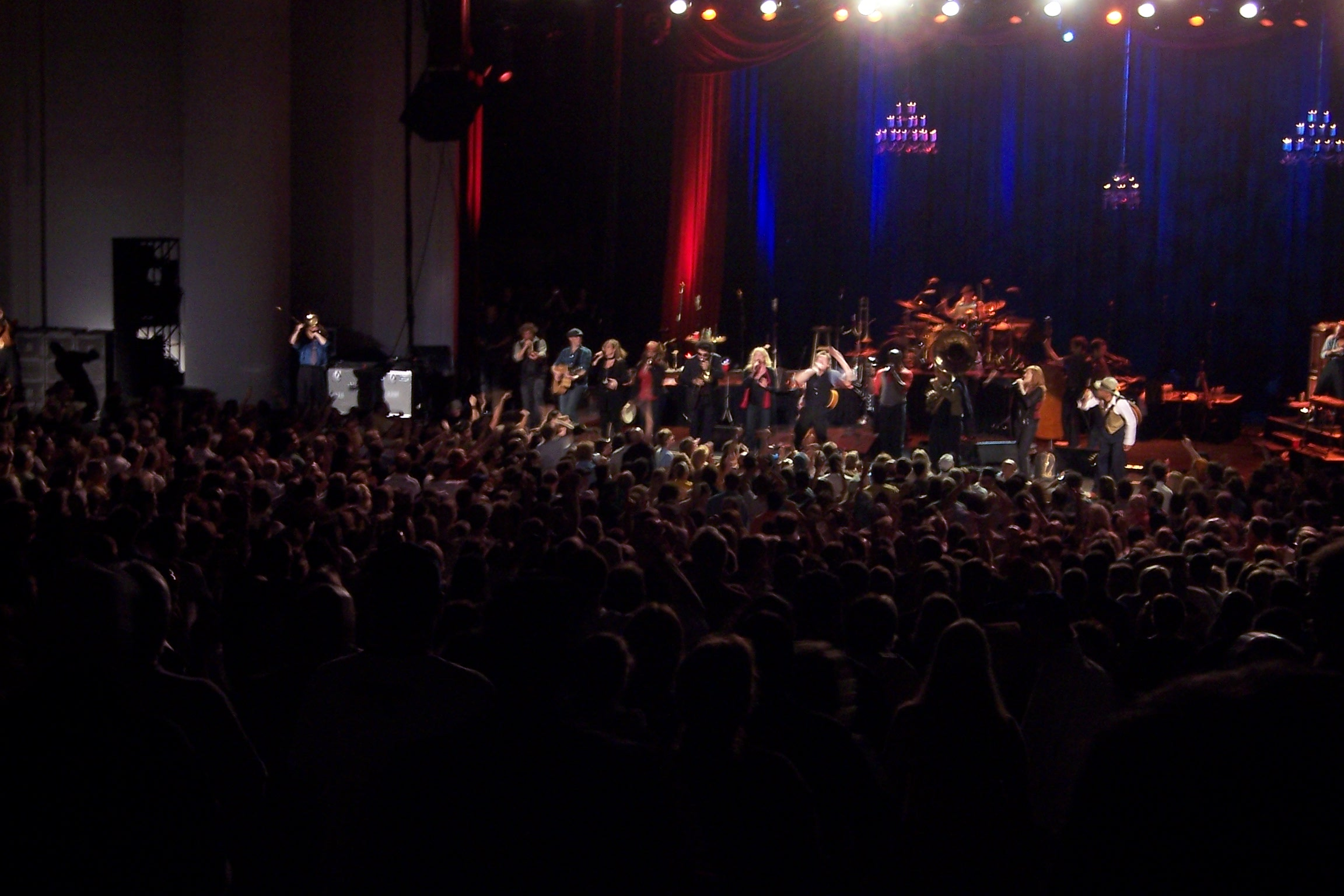
Everyone stage front, near the end of the show at the PNC Bank Arts Center on June 25, 2006. This was one of the few well-attended shows of the American leg of the tour.

In any case, by the conclusion of the leg, things rebounded. Crowds were bigger and knew the material, and the final two New Jersey shows (which had sold out, although not right away) contained very enthusiastic audiences. Springsteen appeared quite grateful, and thanked the fans for "taking a risk by coming out to see us." He closed out the last American show with a "song that explains what we're trying to do ... not what we're trying to do – what we're doing", the 19th-century circus ode and lament, "The Daring Young Man on the Flying Trapeze".

And, when tickets for third leg shows back in Europe went on sale in July, some shows such as those in Dublin sold out within minutes, and others sold out with unprecedented rapidity for music of this genre, usually unseen in arena formats, thus marking again a stark contrast in the tour's reception on the two sides of the Atlantic.

A year later, Springsteen rated the whole experience highly, saying that the Sessions Band were "a tremendous discovery, and just an amazing group of musicians", and saying that he looked forward to working with them again. "American Land" would retain prominence as the accordion-dominated show-closing jig in Springsteen's subsequent E Street Band Magic Tour.

== Broadcasts and recordings ==
Bruce Springsteen – The Seeger Sessions Live, a video recording of a May 9, 2006, performance in London's St Luke Old Street church, was filmed by the BBC and also broadcast in the U.S. by PBS.

In addition, performance sequences from the tour were included on the expanded DVD portions of the October 2006 We Shall Overcome: The Seeger Sessions album reissue.

Three late-in-tour shows at the Point Depot in Dublin were filmed, to materialize in June 2007 on the Bruce Springsteen with The Sessions Band: Live in Dublin DVD, Blu-ray, and CD, a release whose title represented a belated removal of the Seeger connotation from the venture (and one that has been kept since). A 90-minute theatrical version played in various U.S. major cities on June 4, 2007, the day before the commercial release of the DVD/CD.

Audio of the opening show of the tour, at the New Orleans Jazz and Heritage Festival, was released through the Bruce Springsteen Archives in December 2017; full video of this concert was later posted on Springsteen's YouTube channel in May 2019.

A recording of Wembley Arena on November 11 was also released as live archive on August 21, 2020.

The October 10, 2006 show in Rome was released as a live archive on September 2, 2022

== Tour dates ==
Date	City	Country	Venue	Attendance	Revenue
North America
April 30, 2006	New Orleans	United States	New Orleans Fairgrounds		
Europe
May 5, 2006	Dublin	Ireland	Point Theatre	8,384 / 8,384	$778,879
May 7, 2006	Manchester	England	Manchester Evening News Arena		
May 8, 2006	London	England	Hammersmith Apollo		
May 10, 2006	Paris	France	Palais Omnisports de Paris-Bercy		
May 12, 2006	Milan	Italy	Datch Forum		
May 14, 2006	Barcelona	Spain	Pavelló Olímpic de Badalona		
May 16, 2006	Amsterdam	Netherlands	Heineken Music Hall		
May 17, 2006	Frankfurt	Germany	Festhalle Frankfurt		
May 20, 2006	Oslo	Norway	Oslo Spektrum		
May 21, 2006	Stockholm	Sweden	Hovet		
North America
May 27, 2006	Mansfield	United States	Tweeter Center		
May 28, 2006	Bristow	United States	Nissan Pavilion		
May 30, 2006	Columbus	United States	Germain Amphitheater		
May 31, 2006	Noblesville	United States	Verizon Wireless Music Center		
June 3, 2006	Glendale	United States	Glendale Arena		
June 5, 2006	Los Angeles	United States	Greek Theatre		
June 6, 2006	Concord	United States	Sleep Train Pavilion		
June 10, 2006	Des Moines	United States	Wells Fargo Arena	4,421 / 7,046	$391,830
June 11, 2006	Saint Paul	United States	Xcel Energy Center		
June 13, 2006	Tinley Park	United States	First Midwest Bank Amphitheatre		
June 14, 2006	Milwaukee	United States	Bradley Center		
June 16, 2006	Cuyahoga Falls	United States	Blossom Music Center	6,505 / 6,505	$416,572
June 17, 2006	Clarkston	United States	DTE Energy Music Theatre	8,035 / 15,539	$547,400
June 19, 2006	Saratoga Springs	United States	Saratoga Springs Performing Arts Center	8,498 / 15,035	$566,556
June 20, 2006	Camden	United States	Tweeter Center at the Waterfront	11,422 / 23,313	$799,758
June 22, 2006	New York City	United States	Madison Square Garden	12,945 / 12,945	$1,027,015
June 24, 2006	Holmdel	United States	PNC Bank Arts Center	27,637 / 28,014	$1,724,637
June 25, 2006	Holmdel	United States	PNC Bank Arts Center	27,637 / 28,014	$1,724,637
Europe
October 1, 2006	Bologna	Italy	Palamalaguti		
October 2, 2006	Turin	Italy	Palaisozaki		
October 4, 2006	Udine	Italy	Villa Manin		
October 5, 2006	Verona	Italy	Verona Arena		
October 7, 2006	Perugia	Italy	Arena Santa Giuliana		
October 8, 2006	Caserta	Italy	PalaMaggiò		
October 10, 2006	Rome	Italy	PalaLottomatica		
October 12, 2006	Hamburg	Germany	Color Line Arena		
October 13, 2006	Rotterdam	Netherlands	Rotterdam Ahoy Sportpaleis		
October 19, 2006	Madrid	Spain	Plaza de Toros de Las Ventas		
October 21, 2006	Valencia	Spain	Estadi Ciutat de València		
October 22, 2006	Granada	Spain	Plaza de Toros de Granada		
October 24, 2006	Barcelona	Spain	Palau Sant Jordi		
October 25, 2006	Santander	Spain	Palacio de Deportes de Santander		
October 28, 2006	Copenhagen	Denmark	Parken Stadium		
October 29, 2006	Oslo	Norway	Oslo Spektrum		
October 30, 2006	Stockholm	Sweden	Globe Arena		
November 6, 2006	Cologne	Germany	Kölnarena		
November 7, 2006	Antwerp	Belgium	Sportpaleis	16,128 / 16,139	$1,514,231
November 9, 2006	Birmingham	England	National Exhibition Centre		
November 11, 2006	London	England	Wembley Arena		
November 12, 2006	London	England	Wembley Arena		
November 14, 2006	Sheffield	England	Hallam FM Arena		
November 17, 2006	Dublin	Ireland	Point Theatre	25,056 / 25,056	$2,360,668
November 18, 2006	Dublin	Ireland	Point Theatre	25,056 / 25,056	$2,360,668
November 19, 2006	Dublin	Ireland	Point Theatre	25,056 / 25,056	$2,360,668
November 21, 2006	Belfast	Northern Ireland	Odyssey Arena	9,794 / 9,794	$943,614

== Songs performed ==
Originals

Greetings from Asbury Park, New Jersey

- "Blinded By the Light"
- "Does This Bus Stop at 82nd Street?"
- "For You"
- "Growin' Up"

Darkness on the Edge of Town

- "Adam Raised a Cain"
- "Factory"
- "The Promised Land"

The River

- "Cadillac Ranch"
- "Ramrod"
- "The River"
- "You Can Look (But You Better Not Touch)"

Nebraska

- "Atlantic City"
- "Highway Patrolman"
- "Johnny 99"
- "Mansion on the Hill"
- "Open All Night"

Born in the U.S.A.

- "Bobby Jean"

Lucky Town

- "If I Should Fall Behind"

The Ghost of Tom Joad

- "The Ghost of Tom Joad"
- "Youngstown"

The Rising

- "Further On (Up the Road)"
- "Into the Fire"
- "My City of Ruins"

Devils & Dust

- "All the Way Home"
- "Devils & Dust"
- "Long Time Comin'
- "Maria's Bed"

We Shall Overcome: The Seeger Sessions

- "American Land"
- "Bring 'em Home"
- "Buffalo Gals"
- "Erie Canal"
- "Eyes on the Prize"
- "Froggie Went a Courtin'"
- "How Can a Poor Man Stand Such Times and Live?
- "How Can I Keep From Singing?"
- "Jacob's Ladder"
- "Jesse James"
- "John Henry"
- "Mrs. McGrath"
- "My Oklahoma Home"
- "O Mary Don't You Weep"
- "Old Dan Tucker"
- "Pay Me My Money Down"
- "Shenandoah"
- "We Shall Overcome"

Other

- "Land of Hope and Dreams"
- "Long Walk Home"

Cover songs

- "The Daring Young Man on the Flying Trapeze"
- "Dirty Water"
- "Long Black Veil"
- "Love of the Common People"
- "Mystery Train"
- "Rag Mama Rag"
- "Samson and Delilah"
- "This Little Light of Mine"
- "Valerie"
- "When the Saints Go Marching In"

Soundchecked/on setlist but not performed

- "Jesus Was an Only Son"
- "Leah"
- "My Father's House"
- "Turn! Turn! Turn!"

== Personnel ==
The band ranged in size from 17 and 20 members on stage, depending upon availability on a given night. About half the members had played on the Seeger Sessions album, while the other half were new.

- Bruce Springsteen – lead vocals, acoustic guitar, harmonica
- Marc "Chocolate Genius" Thompson – acoustic guitar, background vocals, some featured lead vocals
- Patti Scialfa – acoustic guitar, background vocals, some featured lead and duet vocals
- Frank Bruno – acoustic guitar, background vocals, occasional drums and washboard
- Soozie Tyrell – violin, background vocals
- Sam Bardfeld – violin
- Greg Liszt – banjo
- Marty Rifkin – pedal steel guitar
- Charles Giordano – piano, organ, accordion
- Jeremy Chatzky – upright bass, occasional electric bass
- Larry Eagle – drums
- Lisa Lowell – background vocals
- Curtis King Jr. – background vocals
- Cindy Mizelle – background vocals
- Art Baron – tuba, occasional trombone
- Eddie Manion – saxophone
- Mark Pender and/or Curt Ramm – trumpet
- Richie "La Bamba" Rosenberg and/or Clark Gayton – trombone

Scialfa missed a number of shows (especially in Europe) due to family duties.
Pender and La Bamba missed some shows, or parts of shows, due to Late Night with Conan O'Brien commitments.
