= We Shall Overcome: The Seeger Sessions =

Studio album by Bruce Springsteen
- Released: April 25, 2006
- Recorded: November 1997, March 19, 2005, January 21, 2006
- Studio: Thrill Hill Recording
- Genres: Americana, folk
- Length: 60:34
- Label: Columbia
- Producer: Bruce Springsteen

Bruce Springsteen chronology
Hammersmith Odeon London '75 (2006)	We Shall Overcome: The Seeger Sessions (2006)	Live in Dublin (2007)

We Shall Overcome: The Seeger Sessions is the fourteenth studio album by Bruce Springsteen. Released in 2006, it peaked at number three on the Billboard 200 and won the Grammy Award for Best Traditional Folk Album at the 49th Grammy Awards.

== Background ==
This is Springsteen's first album of entirely non-Springsteen material and contains his interpretation of thirteen folk songs made popular by activist folk musician Pete Seeger. Using songs written by others, Springsteen focused on popularizing and promoting the ethic of local, historical musical influences and recognizing the cultural significance that folk music embodies.

Springsteen's project began in 1997, when he recorded "We Shall Overcome" for the Where Have All the Flowers Gone: the Songs of Pete Seeger tribute album, released the following year. Springsteen had not known much about Seeger, given his rock and roll upbringing, and investigated Seeger's music. While playing one of Seeger's records in his house, Springsteen was given more reason to continue when his 10-year-old daughter said, "Hey, that sounds like fun."

Soozie Tyrell, the violinist in the E Street Band, connected with a group of lesser-known musicians from New Jersey and New York City, and they joined Springsteen to record in an informal setting in Springsteen's Colts Neck farm. The Miami Horns and Springsteen's wife, Patti Scialfa, participated. This group would become the Sessions Band. The subsequent Bruce Springsteen with the Seeger Sessions Band Tour expanded on the album's musical approach.

== Release ==
The album, like its predecessor Devils and Dust, has been released on DualDisc, in a CD/DVD double disc set, and as a set of two vinyl records.

For the DualDisc and CD/DVD sets, the full album is on the CD(-side), while the DVD(-side) side features a PCM Stereo version of the album and a short film about the making and recording of the album. Two bonus songs also appear on the DVD(-side).

On October 3, 2006, the album was reissued as We Shall Overcome: The Seeger Sessions - American Land Edition with five additional tracks (the two bonus tracks from before and three new tracks that had been introduced and heavily featured on the tour), new videos, an expanded documentary and liner notes. Rather than a DualDisc release, the American Land Edition was released with separate CD and DVDs. Added sales were minimal.

== Reception ==
Professional ratings
Review scores
Source	Rating
AllMusic	4.5/5 stars
The A.V. Club	B+
Entertainment Weekly	A−
The Guardian	4/5 stars
The Observer	4/5 stars
Pitchfork	8.5/10
Rolling Stone	4/5 stars
Spin	3/5 stars
Uncut	4/5 stars
The Village Voice	B

We Shall Overcome received widespread acclaim from music critics. At Metacritic, which assigns a normalized rating out of 100 to reviews from mainstream critics, the album received an average score of 82, based on 25 reviews. In his review for AllMusic, Stephen Thomas Erlewine praised Springsteen's modern take on Seeger's repertoire of folk songs and said that it is the liveliest album of his career: "It's a rambunctious, freewheeling, positively joyous record unlike any other in Springsteen's admittedly rich catalog." David Browne of Entertainment Weekly felt that Springsteen successfully imbues the songs with a "rock & roll energy" rather than an adherence to folk's blander musical aesthetic. Rolling Stone magazine's Jonathan Ringen believed that he relied on folk and Americana styles on the album in order to "find a moral compass for a nation that's gone off the rails", particularly on the implicitly political "Oh, Mary Don't You Weep", "Eyes on the Prize", and "We Shall Overcome". Gavin Martin of Uncut called it "a great teeming flood of Americana" and "a powerful example of how songs reverberate through the years to accrue contemporary meaning".

In a less enthusiastic review, Neil Spencer of The Observer wrote that the songs chosen for the album lack intrigue and edge, and are "mostly too corny to have much drama restored to them". Robert Christgau panned We Shall Overcome in his consumer guide for The Village Voice, wherein he gave it a "B", which is assigned to bad albums he reviews as the "dud of the month" in his column. He felt that Springsteen relies too much on a rural drawl and overblown sound when folk music requires subtlety and viewed the album as the worst case of his histrionic singing.

Seeger himself was pleased by the result, saying "It was a great honor. [Springsteen]'s an extraordinary person, as well as an extraordinary singer." We Shall Overcome was voted the 19th best album of the year in the Pazz & Jop, an annual critics poll run by The Village Voice. In 2007, it won the Grammy Award for Best Traditional Folk Album at the 49th Grammy Awards. By January 2009, the album had sold 700,000 copies in the United States. The RIAA certified it with gold record status.

== Track listing ==
All songs traditional or public domain with unknown songwriters and arranged by Bruce Springsteen, unless otherwise noted.

No.	Title	Writer(s)	Length
1.	"Old Dan Tucker"	Unknown, usually attributed to Dan Emmett	2:31
2.	"Jesse James"		3:47
3.	"Mrs. McGrath"		4:19
4.	"O Mary Don't You Weep"		6:05
5.	"John Henry"		5:07
6.	"Erie Canal"	Thomas S. Allen	4:03
7.	"Jacob's Ladder"	Traditional; Pete Seeger version	4:28
8.	"My Oklahoma Home"	Bill and Agnes "Sis" Cunningham	6:03
9.	"Eyes on the Prize"	Traditional; additional lyrics by Alice Wine	5:16
10.	"Shenandoah"		4:52
11.	"Pay Me My Money Down"		4:32
12.	"We Shall Overcome"	attr. Rev. Charles Tindley; musical and lyrical adaptation by Guy Carawan, Frank Hamilton, Zilphia Horton, Pete Seeger	4:53
13.	"Froggie Went A-Courtin'"		4:33

DualDisc bonus tracks
No.	Title	Writer(s)	Length
14.	"Buffalo Gals"		3:12
15.	"How Can I Keep from Singing?"	attr. Robert Wadsworth Lowry; additional lyrics and music adapted by Doris Plenn	2:19

American Land Edition bonus tracks
No.	Title	Writer(s)	Length
14.	"Buffalo Gals"		3:12
15.	"How Can I Keep from Singing?"	attr. Robert Wadsworth Lowry, additional lyrics and music adapted by Doris Plenn	2:19
16.	"How Can a Poor Man Stand Such Times and Live?"	Blind Alfred Reed; additional lyrics by Bruce Springsteen	3:22
17.	"Bring 'Em Home"	Pete Seeger with new verse by Jim Musselman & elements from "When Johnny Comes Marching Home"	3:35
18.	"American Land"	Springsteen, inspired by "He Lies In The American Land" by Andrew Kovaly/Pete Seeger	4:44

== Unreleased outtakes ==
A handful of outtakes went unreleased from the final cut of the album. Springsteen would later release some of these on the American Land version of the album while songs such as the instrumental "Once Upon a Time in the West" was released on the We All Love Ennio Morricone album, a cover of Pete Seeger's "Hobo's Lullaby" made its way onto the Give Us Your Poor charity album. A re-recorded version of Springsteen's "The Ghost of Tom Joad", which featured Pete Seeger, was released on the Sowing the Seeds charity album. A studio version of "Bring 'Em Home" was also released by Sony as an internet download. During these sessions Springsteen also first recorded "Long Walk Home". This version remains unreleased, although it was performed during this tour and would eventually be re-recorded for his next album, 2007's Magic. Two live versions of "American Land" were released; however, the studio recording from these sessions has yet to surface. Springsteen would re-record the song for his 2012 album, Wrecking Ball.

- "American Land"
- "Long Walk Home"
- "I Come and Stand At Every Door"
- "Pretty Boy Floyd"
- "Michael, Row Your Boat Ashore"
- "If I Had a Hammer"
- "Worried Man Blues"

== Personnel ==
Adapted from the liner notes:

Seeger Sessions Studio Band

- Bruce Springsteen – lead vocals, guitar, mandolin, B3 organ, piano, percussion, harmonica, tambourine
- Sam Bardfeld – violin (tracks 1–15), backing vocals (tracks 2, 8, 11)
- Art Baron – tuba (tracks 6, 7, 9, 10, 14)
- Frank Bruno – guitar (tracks 1–14), backing vocals (tracks 1, 2, 4, 6–8, 10, 11)
- Jeremy Chatzky – upright bass (tracks 1–15), backing vocals (tracks 8, 11)
- Mark Clifford – banjo (tracks 1, 2, 4–14), backing vocals (tracks 1, 8, 11)
- Larry Eagle – drums & percussion (tracks 1–15), backing vocals (tracks 8, 11)
- Charles Giordano – B3 organ (tracks 1, 7, 10), piano (tracks 3, 4, 7, 10, 12), accordion (tracks 2, 4–14), pump organ (track 15), backing vocals (tracks 8, 11)
- Eddie Manion – saxophone (tracks 1, 2, 4–15), backing vocals (tracks 11, 12)
- Mark Pender – trumpet (tracks 1, 4–7, 9–15), backing vocals (tracks 1, 2, 4, 6, 7, 9–12, 14, 15)
- Richie "La Bamba" Rosenberg – trombone (tracks 1, 2, 4–15), backing vocals (tracks 1, 2, 4, 6–12, 14, 15)
- Patti Scialfa – backing vocals (tracks 1, 4, 6, 7, 9–12, 14, 15)
- Soozie Tyrell – violin (tracks 1–15), backing vocals (tracks 1, 2, 4, 6–12, 14, 15)

Seeger Sessions Tour Band

- Bruce Springsteen – guitar, lead vocal
- Sam Bardfeld – violin (tracks 16–18)
- Art Baron – tuba (track 16), mandolin (track 17), penny whistle (track 18)
- Frank Bruno – guitar (tracks 16–18)
- Jeremy Chatzky – upright bass (tracks 16–18)
- Larry Eagle – drums, percussion (tracks 16–18)
- Clark Gayton – trombone (tracks 16–18)
- Charles Giordano – B3 organ (track 16), piano (track 16), accordion (tracks 17, 18)
- Curtis King Jr. – backing vocals (tracks 16–18)
- Greg Liszt – banjo (tracks 16–18)
- Lisa Lowell – backing vocals (tracks 16–18)
- Eddie Manion – saxophone (tracks 16–18)
- Cindy Mizelle – backing vocals (tracks 16–18)
- Mark Pender – trumpet (tracks 16–18)
- Curt Ramm – trumpet (track 18)
- Marty Rifkin – pedal steel (tracks 16, 17), dobro (track 18)
- Richie "La Bamba" Rosenberg – trombone (tracks 16–18)
- Patti Scialfa – guitar (tracks 16–18), backing vocals (tracks 16–18)
- Marc Anthony Thompson – guitar (tracks 17, 18), backing vocals (tracks 16–18)
- Soozie Tyrell – violin (tracks 16–18), backing vocals (tracks 16–18)

Technical

- Bruce Springsteen – production
- Toby Scott – recording (tracks 1–15)
- Kevin Buell, Ross Peterson – recording assistants (tracks 1–15)
- Richard Lowe – additional recording assistant (tracks 1–15)
- John Cooper – recording (tracks 16–18)
- John Bruey – recording assistant (tracks 16–18)
- Bob Clearmountain – mixing
- Brandon Duncan – mixing assistant
- Giancarlo Gallo – mixing assistant (track 16)
- Bob Ludwig – mastering
- Chris Austopchuk – art direction
- Michelle Holme – art direction, design
- Meghan Foley – design
- Danny Clinch – photography
- Shari Sutcliffe – contractor

== Charts ==
=== Weekly charts ===
Weekly chart performance for We Shall Overcome: The Seeger Sessions
Chart (2006–07)	Peak position
Australian Albums (ARIA)	21
Austrian Albums (Ö3 Austria)	3
Belgian Albums (Ultratop Flanders)	3
Belgian Albums (Ultratop Wallonia)	10
Canadian Albums (Billboard)	3
Croatian International Albums (HDU)	1
Danish Albums (Hitlisten)	1
Dutch Albums (Album Top 100)	2
Finnish Albums (Suomen virallinen lista)	6
French Albums (SNEP)	9
German Albums (Offizielle Top 100)	5
Hungarian Albums (MAHASZ)	23
Irish Albums (IRMA)	2
Italian Albums (FIMI)	1
New Zealand Albums (RMNZ)	12
Norwegian Albums (VG-lista)	1
Portuguese Albums (AFP)	22
Scottish Albums (Official Charts)	3
Spanish Albums (Promusicae)	2
Swedish Albums (Sverigetopplistan)	1
Swiss Albums (Schweizer Hitparade)	5
UK Albums (Official Charts)	3
US Billboard 200	3
US Top Rock Albums (Billboard)	3

=== Year-end charts ===
2006 year-end chart performance for We Shall Overcome: The Seeger Sessions
Chart (2006)	Position
Belgian Albums (Ultratop Flanders)	44
Dutch Albums (Album Top 100)	27
French Albums (SNEP)	147
German Albums (Offizielle Top 100)	73
Swedish Albums (Sverigetopplistan)	18
UK Albums (OCC)	115
US Billboard 200	100
US Top Rock Albums (Billboard)	20

2007 year-end chart performance for We Shall Overcome: The Seeger Sessions
Chart (2007)	Position
Swedish Albums (Sverigetopplistan)	67

== Certifications and sales ==
Certifications and sales for We Shall Overcome: The Seeger Sessions
Region	Certification	Certified units/sales
Canada (Music Canada)	Gold	50,000^{^}
Denmark (IFPI Danmark)	Platinum	40,000^{^}
Germany (BVMI)	Gold	100,000^{‡}
Ireland (IRMA)	2× Platinum	30,000^{^}
Italy 2006 sales	—	120,000
Spain (Promusicae)	Gold	40,000^{^}
Sweden (GLF)	Gold	30,000^{^}
United Kingdom (BPI)	Gold	100,000^{^}
United States (RIAA)	Gold	500,000^{^}
^{^} Shipments figures based on certification alone.^{‡} Sales+streaming figures based on certification alone.
