= Rumble Doll =

Studio album by Patti Scialfa
- Released: 1993
- Genre: Rock
- Length: 48:50
- Label: Columbia
- Producer: Mike Campbell, Bruce Springsteen

Patti Scialfa chronology
Rumble Doll (1993)	23rd St. Lullaby (2004)

Rumble Doll is the debut full-length album from singer-songwriter Patti Scialfa. It features twelve tracks, eleven by Scialfa and one co-written with Mike Campbell. It also features a number of guest stars in production and playing roles, namely Campbell and Bruce Springsteen, as well as Kenny Aronoff, Jim Keltner, Nils Lofgren, Jeff Porcaro and Benmont Tench.

== Critical reception ==
Professional ratings
Review scores
Source	Rating
AllMusic	3/5 stars

AllMusic's Tim Griggs called the album "a slow seduction". He called the title track "a gem", and praised the production, which he called "low-key compared to 60's girl singers produced by Phil Spector."

== Track listing ==
All tracks are written by Patti Scialfa, except where noted.

No.	Title	Writer(s)	Length
1.	"Rumble Doll"		3:26
2.	"Come Tomorrow"		3:54
3.	"In My Imagination"		4:22
4.	"Valerie"		4:59
5.	"As Long as I (Can Be with You)"		4:47
6.	"Big Black Heaven"		3:38
7.	"Loves Glory"		3:47
8.	"Lucky Girl"	Scialfa, Mike Campbell	4:08
9.	"Charm Light"		3:44
10.	"Baby Don't"		3:11
11.	"Talk to Me Like the Rain"		3:44
12.	"Spanish Dancer"		4:50

== Production ==
- Produced By Mike Campbell & Bruce Springsteen
- Engineers: Mike Campbell, Rob Jaczko, Dennis Kirk, Mark Linett
- Assistant Engineers: Martin Brumbach, Greg Goldman, Brandon Harris, David Knight, Tom Nellen, Mike Piersante, Richard Plank, Chuck Plotkin, Brian Soucy, Gabriel Sutter, Randy Wine
- Mixing: Bob Clearmountain
- Mastering: Stephen Marcussen

== Personnel ==
- Bass: Mike Campbell (tracks 3–5, 7–10)
- Drums: Zachary Alford (track 5), Kenny Aronoff (track 8), Jim Keltner (track 10), Russ Kunkel (track 7), Gary Mallaber (tracks 1, 4, 6, 9, 12), Jeff Porcaro (tracks 2, 11)
- Drum Programming: Mike Campbell (track 3), Patti Scialfa (track 3)
- Guitars: Mike Campbell (tracks 1–12), Nils Lofgren (track 4), Tim Pierce (track 11), Bruce Springsteen (tracks 6, 11)
- Keyboards: Roy Bittan (tracks 4, 7, 12), Patti Scialfa (tracks 1–4, 9–10, 12), Bruce Springsteen (tracks 6, 11), Benmont Tench (tracks 5, 7)
- Bass keyboard: Cliff Carter (track 2)
- Percussion: Zachary Alford (track 5), Kenny Aronoff (track 8), Bobbye Hall (tracks 1, 6, 12), Rob Jaczko (track 7), Jim Keltner (track 10), Gary Mallaber (tracks 3–4, 9), Jeff Porcaro (tracks 2, 11)
- Violin: Soozie Tyrell (track 1)
- Vocals, lead: Patti Scialfa (tracks 1–12)
- Vocals, backing: Lisa Lowell (tracks 1, 3), Patti Scialfa (tracks 1, 3), Soozie Tyrell (tracks 1, 3)
