= 23rd St. Lullaby =

23rd Street Lullaby

Studio album by Patti Scialfa
- Released: June 15, 2004
- Genres: Rock, Roots Rock, AOR
- Length: 12-track album 54:12, with live tracks 69:12
- Labels: Columbia, Sony
- Producers: Steve Jordan, Patti Scialfa

Patti Scialfa chronology
Rumble Doll (1993)	23rd Street Lullaby (2004)	Play It As It Lays (2007)

Professional ratings
Review scores
Source	Rating
allmusic	4/5 stars

23rd Street Lullaby is the second full-length album by singer-songwriter Patti Scialfa. Released in 2004, a full 11 years after her debut, Rumble Doll, it finds her writing all the songs by herself, as well as co-producing the disc with Steve Jordan.

== Reviews ==
Allmusic's Thom Jurek gave the disc four stars of five, saying that it is "a wise, grown-up record, yet it is guided by an untamed, wily heart." He praised the "deceptively simple and immediately accessible" melodies & lyrics, yet says that "they open into swirling wells of emotion carried in the cradle of reminiscence and the heart of desire."

== Track listing ==
All tracks are written by Patti Scialfa

No.	Title	Length
1.	"23rd Street Lullaby"	4:21
2.	"You Can't Go Back"	4:43
3.	"Rose"	5:11
4.	"City Boys"	2:43
5.	"Love (Stand Up)"	5:25
6.	"Yesterday's Child"	4:27
7.	"Stumbling To Bethlehem"	4:08
8.	"Each Other's Medicine"	2:58
9.	"Romeo"	5:11
10.	"State Of Grace"	4:21
11.	"Chelsea Avenue"	4:55
12.	"Young In The City"	4:29

=== Live tracks ===
There are three live tracks on a 2nd bonus disc (with limited edition copies)

1. "23rd Street Lullaby" 5:11
2. "Spanish Dancer" 4:55
3. "As Long As You Can Be" 5:14

== Production ==
- Produced By Steve Jordan & Patti Scialfa
- Engineers – Roger Moutenot, Toby Scott, Trina Shoemaker, Eric Tew
- Mixing – Bob Clearmountain
- Mastering – Bob Ludwig

== Personnel ==
- Steve Jordan - drums, percussion, drum loops
- Greg Cohen, Steve Jordan, Nils Lofgren, Willie Weeks - bass guitar
- Clifford Carter, Patti Scialfa, Bruce Springsteen - keyboards
- John Medeski - piano
- Bobby Bandiera, Larry Campbell, Nils Lofgren, Marc Ribot, Patti Scialfa, Bruce Springsteen - guitar
- Soozie Tyrell - violin
- Jane Scarpantoni - cello
- Tiffany Andrews, Steve Jordan, Michelle Moore, Antoinette Moore, Soozie Tyrell - backing vocals
