= Devils & Dust Tour =

2005 concert tour by Bruce Springsteen

- Tour by Bruce Springsteen
- Associated album: Devils & Dust
- Start date: April 21, 2005
- End date: November 22, 2005
- Legs: 4
- No. of shows: 76

Bruce Springsteen concert chronology
- Vote for Change (2004); Devils & Dust Tour (2005); Sessions Band Tour (2006)

The Devils & Dust Tour was a 2005 concert tour featuring the American singer-songwriter Bruce Springsteen performing alone on stage on a variety of instruments. It followed the release of his 2005 album Devils & Dust. The tour was named the Top Small Venue Tour of 2005 by the Billboard Touring Awards.

== Approach ==
The Devils & Dust album, while not using the E Street Band as a whole and being in the more acoustic, somber vein of his earlier Nebraska and The Ghost of Tom Joad works, was not without (sometimes substantial) instrumentation and arrangements.

Thus when Springsteen began rehearsals for the upcoming tour in Asbury Park's Paramount Theatre, he experimented with a small band line-up. Although the rehearsals were closed, a dozen or two diehard Springsteen fans would stand outside the theatre each day on the chilly early spring boardwalk, listening through walls to try to hear what was being played, a practice that had been going on since the E Street Band's Reunion Tour rehearsals in 1999. These fans reported that Springsteen was rehearsing with Nils Lofgren (guitar and keyboards), Danny Federici (organ), Soozie Tyrell (violin and vocals), and Steve Jordan (drums), all of whom had participated in recording the album.

After a week or two of this, however, Springsteen decided it was not what he wanted. The musicians disappeared, and Springsteen would perform on the tour all by himself. As he told Rolling Stone before the tour began, "Nils and some other folks came in for rehearsals to give me a sense of if I wanted to go with something bigger. But what tends to be dramatic is either the full band or you onstage by yourself. Playing alone creates a sort of drama and intimacy for the audience: They know it's just them and just you." He would further explain his challenge to Esquire during the tour: "I don't have a piano and a sax and drums behind me on this tour. So I had to re-approach the guitar as an instrument of solo accompaniment. It becomes a bit of a new land, and I'll play it in ways I've never played it before. I'm constantly asking myself, How can I wring as much music and meaning as possible out of those six strings? One thing I do know: With the correct playing style, you can summon up an orchestra."

== Itinerary ==
Tour advertisement, showing Springsteen at the pump organ

The tour began in April 2005 with two public rehearsal shows in Asbury Park's Paramount Theatre, as well as a promotional appearance in Red Bank for VH1's Storytellers.

The tour's first proper leg then began in late April with 14 concerts across the United States in mid-sized halls and partially curtained-off arenas; the opening show was April 25, the day of the album's release, in the Fox Theatre in Detroit, Michigan. Without a break the second leg commenced, visiting Western Europe from late May through the end of June for 20 shows across various countries. After a two-week break, the third leg comprised 17 shows across Canada and the U.S., sometimes now playing in full-sized arenas. In mid-August the tour took a two-month break off. The fourth leg then took place in October and November, playing mostly Springsteen hot spots along the U.S. Eastern Seaboard to give repeat concert-goers a chance to see how the tour had evolved; the final show was November 22 at Sovereign Bank Arena in Trenton, New Jersey.

== Show ==
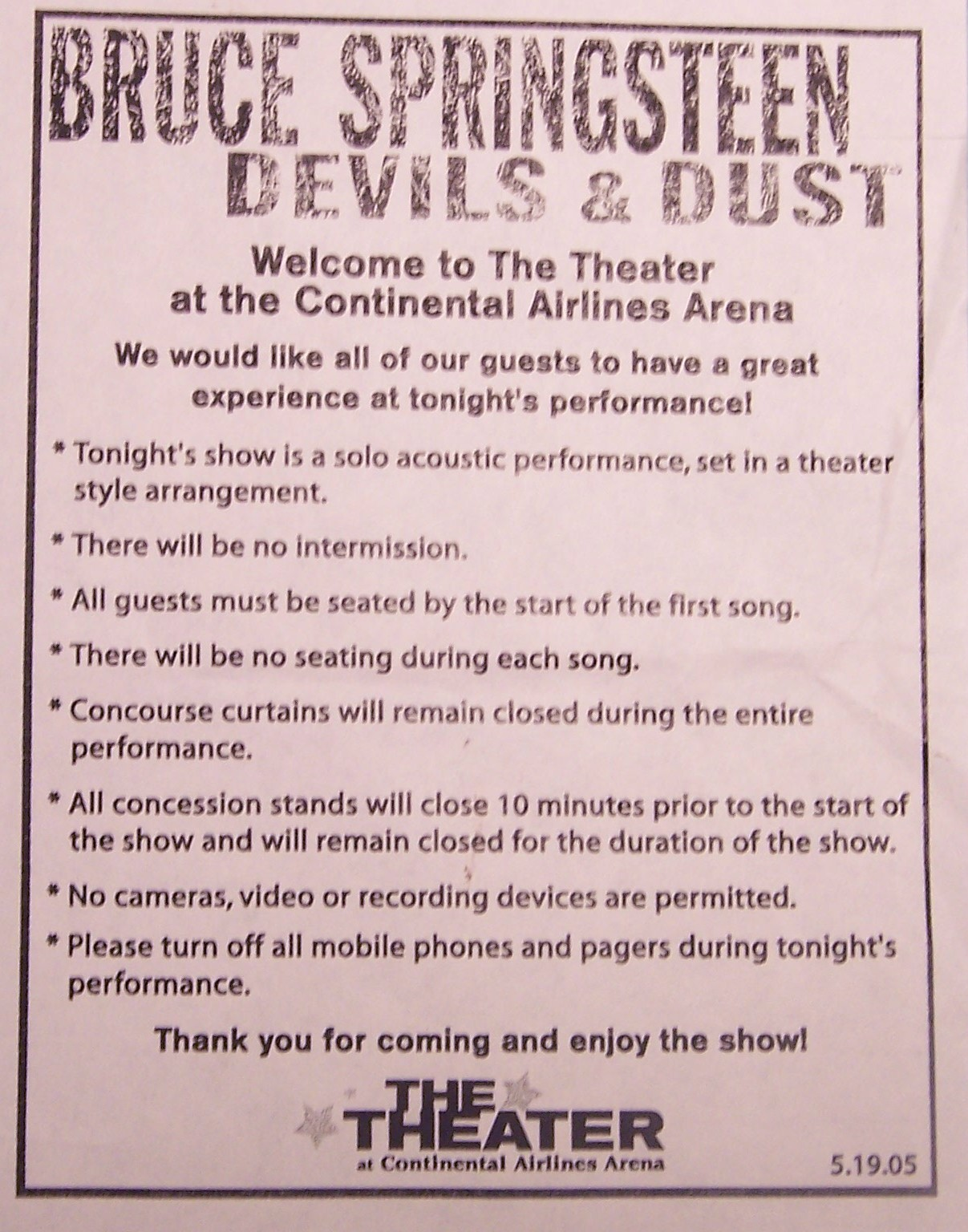
The paper handout.

Audience members at larger venues were often greeted by a paper handout, proclaiming that "Tonight's show is a solo acoustic [sic] performance, set in a theater style arrangement ... There will be no seating during each song ... All concession stands will close 10 minutes prior to the start of the show ..." The concert's stage set was sparse, with a few instrument stations laid out, a carpet and lamp, two reddish chandeliers, and darkish, subdued stage lighting.

The instrument stations were indeed a break with the past, for Springsteen's 1995–1996 solo Ghost of Tom Joad Tour has seen him only playing acoustic guitar and harmonica. On the Devils & Dust Tour, by contrast, he would not only play those two, but add piano, electric piano, pump organ, autoharp, ukulele, banjo, electric guitar, and stomping board, thus adding considerable variety to the solo sound. Furthermore, his guitar tech Kevin Buell and a mysterious "Mr. Fitz" would on some songs contribute hidden, off-stage acoustic guitar, synthesizer, and percussion. This ran against Springsteen's purely solo performance claim, but provided welcome instrumental coloring (and there was a precedent, as offstage keyboards had been used a bit on the Ghost of Tom Joad Tour as well). And while the tour was officially billed as "Solo & Acoustic", there were in fact two electric instruments onstage and one offstage.

The tone of the performance was set at the start, when Springsteen would ask for quiet during the performance and humorously threaten audience members with mayhem if their cell phones went off. Then a "song" would be performed using only an amplified "stomping board" and an ultra-distorting vocal "bullet microphone", two devices designed to render any words or melody utterly incomprehensible to all but the sharpest of ears. The work most frequently presented in this slot was "Reason to Believe", from the 1982 LP, Nebraska. Springsteen would then perform a few recent songs on guitar and harmonica, usually from Devils & Dust or The Rising.

Then would come two batches of piano or electric piano performances. These were either emotional classic favorites such as "The River" or "Backstreets" or "Racing in the Street", or surprises from his back catalog, including intense tracks from The River such as "Stolen Car", "Wreck on the Highway", and "Drive All Night" that had not been played live for over two decades. Later in the tour more obscure selections were dug up, such as "Iceman", "Santa Ana", and "Zero and Blind Terry", never released until appearing on the 1998 Tracks box set, as well as the truly obscure, such as "Song to the Orphans", never released at all and unplayed since the early 1970s (it was later released on 2020's Letter to You). Such numbers were often humorously dedicated by Springsteen — "This is a song for the people who know more about me than I do about myself" — and indeed received many positive reactions from the die-hard fans who knew, or at least knew of, them.

Springsteen is, by his own admission, not a fully fluid or confident piano player. After playing piano some in concert during the early-mid 1970s, he had generally avoided it since, with the exception of a one-time benefit performance for the Christic Institute in 1990. In the 2000s, he had begun to give it a try again, a couple of times on the final leg of the Reunion Tour, then in the relaxed environment of Asbury Park holiday shows, and then in occasional spots on the 2002–2003 Rising Tour. His lack of skills had been illustrated in the Live in Barcelona DVD from that tour, when a solo piano "Spirit in the Night" had completely broken down. Now, for the first time, he was doing it on a steady basis, and with nowhere to hide if he made mistakes; indeed this challenge may have in part the motivation for doing the tour solo. Verdicts on his playing were mixed: fans downloading bootlegged MP3s from the shows could sometimes hear clear mistakes, especially during instrumental breaks; one reviewer found power in his playing and another proficiency; The Arizona Republic wrote that "Springsteen showed off improved piano skills"; Runaway American Dream mused that "During an impromptu electric-piano 'All That Heaven Will Allow', Springsteen seemed delighted during the solo when he hit the right notes"; while HARP Magazine said "Springsteen's piano playing was perfectly imperfect." In any case, for the faithful the rarities and the frequent set list changes in the piano numbers seemed to more than make up for any technical deficiencies.

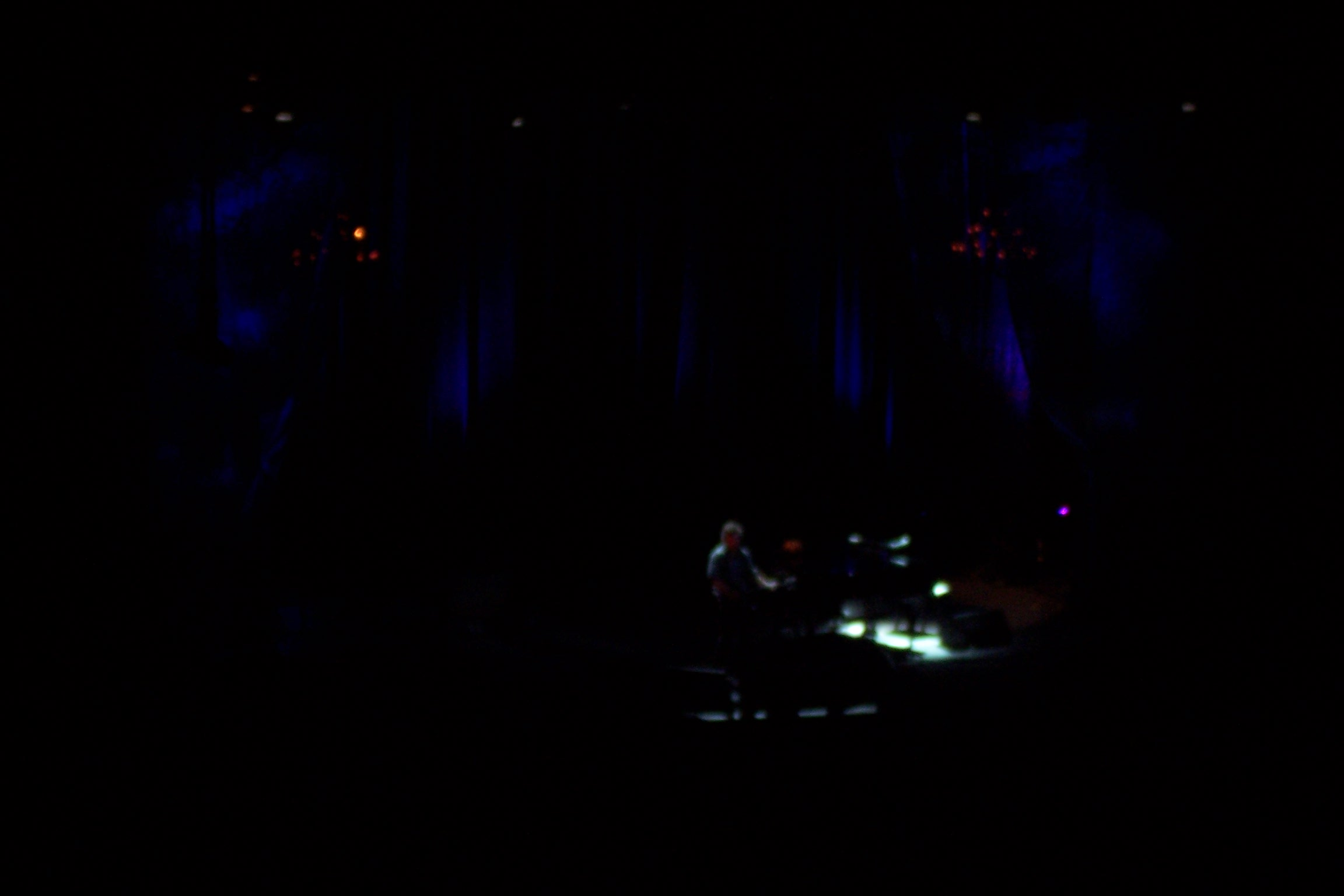
On a dark stage. Continental Airlines Arena, May 19, 2005.

The end of the regular set would always contain four or five of the dourest Devils & Dust numbers played in succession, concluding to silence with the difficult "Matamoros Banks" (the illegal immigrant protagonist starts the song dead under a river with turtles gnawing at him). For artist who had built a reputation for rousing set closers such as "Rosalita" and "Light of Day", this draining and unpleasant finale was more than a bit of a departure.

The encore would first feature some up-tempo liveliness, with high-energy guitar run-throughs of fan favorites such as "Ramrod", "Land of Hope and Dreams", or "Does This Bus Stop At 82nd Street?" But then would come an unearthly, distinctly non-anthemic rendition of his popular rallying cry "The Promised Land", built around a percussive vocalization and guitar slaps approach somewhat similar to his Ghost of Tom Joad Tour version. And then the final selection would be one of his most unusual ever—a modified version of 1970s cult band Suicide's obscure "Dream Baby Dream". Played on pump organ with a reverberating drone, assisted by an offstage synthesizer, Springsteen cycled around and around, minute after minute, through pieces of the simple yet disjointed lyrics – "Dream baby dream, I just want to see you smile, come on, dream baby dream" – until eventually he would get up from the organ and walk around the stage, the offstage music still coming, he still repeating through the lyrics, looking out over the audience as if he were giving them a puzzled benediction, then finally walking off stage still singing and without further remarks, the end. Some "Dream Baby Dream"s lasted eight minutes, nine, ten or more.

== Set list ==
Originals

Greetings from Asbury Park, New Jersey

- "Blinded By the Light"
- "Does This Bus Stop At 82nd Street?"
- "For You"
- "It's Hard to Be a Saint in the City"
- "Lost in the Flood"
- "Spirit in the Night"

The Wild, the Innocent & the E Street Shuffle

- "4th of July, Asbury Park (Sandy)"
- "Incident on 57th Street"
- "Wild Billy's Circus Story"

Born to Run

- "Backstreets"
- "Born to Run"
- "Meeting Across the River"
- "Thunder Road"

Darkness on the Edge of Town

- "Adam Raised a Cain"
- "Darkness on the Edge of Town"
- "The Promised Land"
- "Prove It All Night"
- "Racing in the Street"
- "Something in the Night"

The River

- "Cadillac Ranch"
- "Drive All Night"
- "Fade Away"
- "Hungry Heart"
- "I Wanna Marry You"
- "Indepencence Day"
- "Point Blank"
- "Ramrod"
- "The River"
- "Sherry Darling"
- "Stolen Car"
- "The Ties That Bind"
- "Wreck on the Highway"
- "You Can Look (But You Better Not Touch)"

Nebraska

- "Atlantic City"
- "Highway Patrolman"
- "Johnny 99"
- "Mansion on the Hill"
- "My Father's House"
- "Nebraska"
- "Open All Night"
- "Reason to Believe"
- "State Trooper"
- "Used Cars"

Born in the U.S.A.

- "Bobby Jean"
- "Born in the U.S.A."
- "Darlington County"
- "Downbound Train"
- "I'm on Fire"
- "My Hometown"

Tunnel of Love

- "Ain't Got You"
- "All That Heaven Will Allow"
- "Brilliant Disguise"
- "Cautious Man"
- "One Step Up"
- "Spare Parts"
- "Tougher Than the Rest"
- "Tunnel of Love"
- "Two Faces"
- "Valentine's Day"
- "Walk Like a Man"
- "When You're Alone"

Human Touch

- "I Wish I Were Blind"
- "Real World"
- "Roll of the Dice"
- "Soul Driver"

Lucky Town

- "Better Days"
- "Book of Dreams"
- "If I Should Fall Behind"
- "Leap of Faith"
- "Living Proof"
- "Local Hero"
- "Lucky Town"
- "My Beautiful Reward"

Greatest Hits

- "This Hard Land"

The Ghost of Tom Joad

- "Across the Border"
- "Dry Lightning"
- "Galveston Bay"
- "The Ghost of Tom Joad"
- "Highway 29"
- "The Line"
- "My Best Was Never Good Enough"
- "The New Timer"
- "Sinaloa Cowboys"
- "Straight Time"
- "Youngstown"

Tracks

- "A Good Man is Hard to Find (Pittsburgh)"
- "Back In Your Arms"
- "Be True"
- "Cynthia"
- "Frankie"
- "Iceman"
- "Janey, Don't You Lose Heart"
- "Part Man Part Monkey"
- "Sad Eyes"
- "Santa Ana"
- "Shut Out the Light"
- "Thundercrack"
- "Two For the Road"
- "The Wish"
- "Zero and Blind Terry"

18 Tracks

- "The Fever"
- "The Promise"

The Rising

- "Countin' on a Miracle"
- "Empty Sky"
- "Further (On Up the Road)"
- "Into the Fire"
- "Lonesome Day"
- "Mary's Place"
- "Nothing Man"
- "Paradise"
- "The Rising"
- "Waitin' on a Sunny Day"
- "You're Missing"

The Essential Bruce Springsteen

- "County Fair"
- "Lift Me Up"

Devils & Dust

- "All I'm Thinkin' About"
- "All the Way Home"
- "Black Cowboys"
- "Devils & Dust"
- "The Hitter"
- "Jesus Was a Only Son"
- "Leah"
- "Long Time Comin'"
- "Maria's Bed"
- "Matamoros Banks"
- "Reno"
- "Silver Palomino"

Other (non-album songs)

- "Because the Night"
- "Fire"
- "Land of Hope and Dreams"
- "Songs For Orphans"
- "The Wall"

Cover songs

- "Dirty Water"
- "Dream Baby Dream"
- "Homestead"
- "Idiot's Delight"
- "Oklahoma Hills"
- "Rumble"
- "Santa Claus is Coming to Town"

Soundchecked/on setlist not performed
- "American Skin (41 Shots)"
- "Car Wash"
- "Cover Me"
- "Cross My Heart"
- "Dancing in the Dark"
- "Happy"
- "Jackson Cage"
- "Kitty's Back"
- "Loose Ends"
- "Pony Boy"
- "Real Man"
- "Seven Angels"
- "T.V. Movie"
- "Worlds Apart"

== Tour dates ==
Date	City	Country	Venue	Attendance	Revenue
North America
April 25, 2005	Detroit	United States	Fox Theatre	4,775 / 4,775	$407,776
April 28, 2005	Grand Prairie	United States	Nokia Theatre at Grand Prairie	5,114 / 6,197	$433,310
April 30, 2005	Glendale	United States	Glendale Arena		
May 2, 2005	Los Angeles	United States	Pantages Theatre	5,457 / 5,457	$451,752
May 3, 2005	Los Angeles	United States	Pantages Theatre	5,457 / 5,457	$451,752
May 5, 2005	Oakland	United States	Oakland Paramount Theatre		
May 7, 2005	Denver	United States	Colorado Convention Center Lecture Hall		
May 10, 2005	St. Paul	United States	Xcel Energy Center	7,072 / 7,072	$691,569
May 11, 2005	Rosemont	United States	Rosemont Theatre	4,355 / 4,355	$366,195
May 14, 2005	Fairfax	United States	Patriot Center	6,909 / 6,909	$573,885
May 15, 2005	Cleveland	United States	Wolstein Center	7,384 / 7,384	$599,305
May 17, 2005	Upper Darby	United States	Tower Theater		
May 19, 2005	East Rutherford	United States	The Theater at Continental Airlines Arena		
May 20, 2005	Boston	United States	Orpheum Theatre		
Europe
May 24, 2005	Dublin	Ireland	Point Theatre		
May 27, 2005	London	England	Royal Albert Hall	8,538 / 8,538	$752,865
May 28, 2005	London	England	Royal Albert Hall	8,538 / 8,538	$752,865
May 30, 2005	Brussels	Belgium	Forest National	6,888 / 6,888	$691,569
June 1, 2005	Barcelona	Spain	Pavelló Olímpic de Badalona		
June 2, 2005	Madrid	Spain	Palacio de Deportes de la Comunidad de Madrid	7,109 / 7,109	$573,571
June 4, 2005	Bologna	Italy	Palamalaguti	8,500 / 8,500	$560,289
June 6, 2005	Rome	Italy	PalaLottomatica	7,117 / 7,117	$564,640
June 7, 2005	Milan	Italy	Datch Forum	7,954 / 7,954	$516,450
June 13, 2005	Munich	Germany	Olympiahalle	7,051 / 7,051	$691,569
June 15, 2005	Frankfurt	Germany	Festhalle	6,854 / 6,854	$603,635
June 16, 2005	Düsseldorf	Germany	Philipshalle		
June 19, 2005	Rotterdam	The Netherlands	Rotterdam Ahoy Sportpaleis	8,355 / 8,355	$775,174
June 20, 2005	Paris	France	Palais Omnisports de Paris-Bercy	8,072 / 8,072	$616,190
June 22, 2005	Copenhagen	Denmark	Forum København	6,580 / 6,580	$539,001
June 23, 2005	Gothenburg	Sweden	Scandinavium	8,231 / 8,231	$594,540
June 25, 2005	Stockholm	Sweden	Hovet	7,495 / 7,495	$547,981
June 27, 2005	Hamburg	Germany	Color Line Arena	7,835 / 7,835	$615,587
June 28, 2005	Berlin	Germany	ICC Berlin		
North America
July 13, 2005	Ottawa	Canada	Corel Center		
July 14, 2005	Toronto	Canada	Air Canada Centre		
July 16, 2005	Albany	United States	Pepsi Arena	8,325 / 8,325	$666,575
July 18, 2005	Buffalo	United States	HSBC Arena		
July 20, 2005	Bridgeport	United States	Arena at Harbor Yard		
July 23, 2005	Atlanta	United States	Philips Arena	6,541 / 10,597	$419,055
July 24, 2005	Charlotte	United States	Charlotte Coliseum		
July 26, 2005	Greensboro	United States	Greensboro Coliseum		
July 28, 2005	Pittsburgh	United States	Petersen Events Center		
July 31, 2005	Columbus	United States	Value City Theatre		
August 1, 2005	Cincinnati	United States	U.S. Bank Arena		
August 3, 2005	Grand Rapids	United States	Van Andel Arena	5,575 / 8,501	$460,610
August 6, 2005	St. Louis	United States	Fox Theatre		
August 7, 2005	Milwaukee	United States	Bradley Center	5,594 / 7,000	$463,920
August 10, 2005	Portland	United States	Rose Garden Theater of the Clouds		
August 11, 2005	Seattle	United States	KeyArena at Seattle Center		
August 13, 2005	Vancouver	Canada	Pontiac Theatre at GM Place		
October 4, 2005	Asbury Park	United States	Paramount Theatre		
October 6, 2005	Rochester	United States	Blue Cross Arena at the War Memorial		
October 7, 2005	Hartford	United States	Hartford Civic Center	6,295 / 7,525	$504,605
October 9, 2005	Uniondale	United States	Nassau Veterans Memorial Coliseum		
October 12, 2005	Minneapolis	United States	Northrop Auditorium	4,539 / 4,539	$366,195
October 13, 2005	Chicago	United States	United Center	7,856 / 7,856	$658,420
October 15, 2005	Madison	United States	Dane County Arena at Alliant Center	5,312 / 7,500	$388,700
October 20, 2005	Worcester	United States	DCU Center	8,757 / 10,209	$691,569
October 21, 2005	Providence	United States	Dunkin' Donuts Center		
October 24, 2005	Richmond	United States	Richmond Coliseum	5,712 / 5,712	$424,432
October 28, 2005	Boston	United States	TD Banknorth Garden	18,124 / 18,124	$1,482,110
October 30, 2005	Boston	United States	TD Banknorth Garden	18,124 / 18,124	$1,482,110
November 4, 2005	Tampa	United States	St. Pete Times Forum	8,433 / 13,604	$613,303
November 8, 2005	Philadelphia	United States	Wachovia Spectrum	16,117 / 16,117	$1,285,945
November 9, 2005	Philadelphia	United States	Wachovia Spectrum	16,117 / 16,117	$1,285,945
November 11, 2005	Norfolk	United States	Constant Convocation Center at Old Dominion University	6,283 / 6,283	$436,030
November 13, 2005	Atlantic City	United States	Boardwalk Hall	9,619 / 9,619	$763,015
November 16, 2005	East Rutherford	United States	Continental Airlines Arena		
November 17, 2005	East Rutherford	United States	Continental Airlines Arena		
November 19, 2005	Hollywood	United States	Hard Rock Live Arena		
November 21, 2005	Trenton	United States	Sovereign Bank Arena	13,878 / 14,341	$1,104,098
November 22, 2005	Trenton	United States	Sovereign Bank Arena	13,878 / 14,341	$1,104,098

== Critical and commercial reception ==
The show was definitely a challenge to its audience, especially when presented in a cavernous arena. Casual Springsteen fans, if they came at all, would leave a bit bewildered. The faithful often found the shows rewarding. In retrospect, however, some fans wondered if some of the limitations of the tour might have been overcome if Springsteen had stuck with his original small-band lineup. However, others believe the Devils and Dust tour was Springsteen at his best, creating some of the most exciting shows longtime fans have ever seen. Springsteen played a total of 140 different songs during the tour. Few artists have ever played such a large variety of songs during one tour. Springsteen showcased his musical talent and made fans want to follow him on tour from the excitement created by so many different songs being played each night. The Devils & Dust material had been the ones most using the offstage instruments, and these fans believed even more would have helped, as effective large-group versions of that album's "Devils & Dust" and "Long Time Comin'" proved on the following year's Sessions Band Tour.

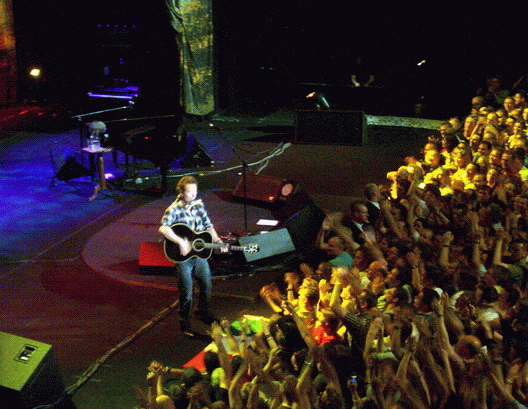
An acoustic guitar number at the Festhalle Frankfurt, June 15, 2005.

Critical reaction to the Devils & Dust Tour was generally favorable. Daily Variety reviewed a Los Angeles show by saying, "On a night that can be described as nothing short of magical, his solo show was a dream come true ... nearly every moment in the 2½-hour show resonated with truth." Billboard called the show "spare and pensive", noting that "the artist has consistently changed up the set list and reinvented dozens of songs from his more than three-decade career." The local Asbury Park Press portrayed Springsteen's attitude during the show as "[One who] has seen some things, heard some things and done some things — most of them terrible, some of them extraordinarily wonderful. [...] As the pilgrim stands before the crowd, he makes no grand pronouncements. He seems puzzled by both the evil and the beauty in the world." LA Weekly was less impressed, objecting to Springsteen's choice of unfamiliar material and that he "insists fans neither clap nor sing along." New Jersey's Upstage magazine liked the show in general, but felt that the use of off-stage musicians was unsettling, saying "the idea of a solo acoustic tour loses something when it features other musicians who are neither given credit for their work nor seen on stage." (In the final two shows of the tour, Springsteen brought out and introduced the off-stage keyboard player, Alan Fitzgerald, and played with him on-stage.) The Austin American-Statesman found the show uneven, with Springsteen unlikely to gain new fans from it.

Attendance was disappointing in a few regions where Springsteen's drawing power had gradually been showing weakness, and everywhere but in Europe tickets were easier to get than in the past. Nevertheless, the tour did well commercially overall. Billboard reported that "Springsteen's stripped-down Devils & Dust tour did big business in 2005, grossing more than $33.4 million from 65 shows reported to Billboard Boxscore, 46 of them sellouts."

The Devils & Dust Tour subsequently won the Billboard Roadworks '05 Touring Award for Best Small Venue Tour, an award based on sales.

== Broadcasts and recordings ==
The two Boston shows from October 2005 and the two tour closing shows from Trenton, New Jersey, in November 2005 were filmed with talk of a DVD release, which has not materialized as of 2025.

Several shows were released as part of the Bruce Springsteen Archives:

- Schottenstein Center, Ohio 2005, released on September 25, 2015
- Van Andel Arena, Michigan 2005, released on February 2, 2018
- Sovereign Bank Arena, Trenton, NJ 2005, released on March 1, 2019
- Hovet, Stockholm, Sweden, released on June 12, 2020
- Tower Theatre 2005, released on September 3, 2021
- Vancouver, BC 2005, released on February 7, 2025.
- Buffalo, NY 2005, released on August 7, 2026.

== Sources ==
- Springsteen's official website still has 2005 tour information on it.
- Backstreets.com's 2005 tour set lists and show descriptions capture the contents and feel of each show, and indicate what instruments were used to play each song; unfortunately, they are not structured as to allow direct linking to individual shows.
- Killing Floor's concert database gives valuable coverage to the pre-tour rehearsals as well, but also does not support direct linking to individual dates.
