= Play It as It Lays (album) =

Studio album by Patti Scialfa
- Released: September 11, 2007
- Recorded: Early 2007
- Genre: Rock, Roots rock, AOR
- Length: 39:06
- Label: Columbia, Sony
- Producer: Steve Jordan, Patti Scialfa, Ron Aniello

Patti Scialfa chronology
23rd St. Lullaby (2004)	Play It as It Lays (2007)

Professional ratings
Review scores
Source	Rating
AllMusic	4/5 stars

Play It as It Lays is the third full-length album by singer-songwriter Patti Scialfa.

== Track listing ==
All tracks are written by Patti Scialfa.

No.	Title	Length
1.	"Looking For Elvis"	3:59
2.	"Like Any Woman Would"	4:15
3.	"Town Called Heartbreak"	5:29
4.	"Play Around"	3:51
5.	"Rainy Day Man"	4:04
6.	"The Word"	5:44
7.	"Bad For You"	3:39
8.	"Run, Run, Run"	3:24
9.	"Play It as It Lays"	4:24
10.	"Black Ladder"	2:12

"The Word", "Town Called Heartbreak" and "Like Any Woman Would" use elements or samples of songs written or recorded by other artists. Used by permissions.

== Production ==
- Produced by Steve Jordan, Patti Scialfa, Ron Aniello
- Recorded by Dave O'Donnell at Thrill Hill Studios
- Mixed by Bob Clearmountain at Mix This!
- Additional Engineering by Toby Scott, Eddie Jackson, Trina Shoemaker, Ron Aniello, Roger Moutenot, Brandon Duncan
- Mastered by Bob Ludwig at Gateway Mastering

== Personnel ==
The Whack Brothers Rhythm Section

- Clifford Carter - keyboards
- Steve Jordan - drums, percussion, acoustic guitar 8
- Nils Lofgren - pedal steel, dobro slide
- Bruce Springsteen - B3 organ 4 and 9, acoustic guitars 1 and 3, electric guitar 5 and 9, harmonica 1
- Willie Weeks - bass

Additional musicians:

- Ron Aniello - guitar, keyboards
- Errol "Crusher" Bennett - percussion 2 and 3
- Jeremy Chatzky - bass 4 and 10
- Patti Scialfa - acoustic guitar, banjo, Wurlitzer
- Mark Stewert - cello 1, 6, 9, guitar 1, banjo 9
- Soozie Tyrell - violin 6 and 9
- Scott Tibbs - synth strings 9

Background Vocals

- Soozie Tyrell - 5, 6, 8 and 9
- Lisa Lowell - 5, 6, 8 and 9
- Michelle Moore - bridge vocal solo 2, background vocals 3 and 8
- Cindy Mizelle - 1, 3 and 8
- Curtis King - 1
