= Devils & Dust (song) =

Single by Bruce Springsteen

from the album Devils & Dust
- Released: March 28, 2005
- Recorded: March–August 2004
- Length: 4:58
- Label: Columbia
- Songwriter: Bruce Springsteen
- Producer: Brendan O'Brien

Bruce Springsteen singles chronology
"Waitin' on a Sunny Day" (2003)	"Devils & Dust" (2005)	"Pay Me My Money Down" (2006)

"Devils & Dust" is the title track on Bruce Springsteen's thirteenth studio album, Devils & Dust, and was released as a single in 2005. Concerning the Iraq War, the song gained critical praise as well as a Grammy Award for Song of the Year nomination.

== History ==
The song tells the story of a troubled American soldier who is presumably serving in the 2003 invasion of Iraq. The soldier questions his role and struggles to find guidance in his mission, all the while wary of the changes he is undergoing:

I got God on my side,
I'm just trying to survive -
What if, what you do to survive
Kills the things you love.
Fear's a powerful thing ...

Unsure of whom to trust in a time of tremendous moral ambiguity, the narrator's reliance upon God is tested when he sees his comrade and fellow soldier, Bobbie, dying in "a field of blood and stone." As the song concludes, the soldier maintains that he "wants to take a righteous stand" and will continue to search for a morally correct solution. It is thus not an anti-war song in a conventional sense. The line "I got God on my side" might be a reference to Bob Dylan's classic anti-war song "With God on Our Side".

Springsteen originally soundchecked the song with the E Street Band during The Rising Tour on April 11, 2003, at Pacific Coliseum in Vancouver, British Columbia, Canada. The song was again rehearsed on September 27 and 28, 2004, before the Vote For Change tour with the E Street Band.

As recorded for the Devils & Dust album, the song has a dynamic arrangement, belying the common image of the album being "acoustic" or "folk". "Devils & Dust" starts off quietly with Springsteen on acoustic guitar. Beginning in the second verse, a muted, ominous synthesizer-and-horns sound begins to be heard, joined in halfway through the verse by a more pronounced, cyclical strings line courtesy of the Nashville String Machine. After the second chorus, Springsteen plays a substantial harmonica solo, high in the mix, as drums and bass from Steve Jordan and producer Brendan O'Brien kick in. The third verse goes quiet again, before drums and percussion return; a reprise of the harmonica line carries the outro.

The single was released ahead of the album, initially appearing on AOL First Listen on March 28, 2005, then as a digital single on iTunes on March 29, then on radio as of April 4 and finally from other digital music providers as of April 5.

"Devils & Dust" saw scant radio airplay and peaked at #72 on the Billboard Hot 100, but the song received much more positive critical acclaim. The song was nominated for three Grammy Awards: Song of the Year, Best Rock Song, and Best Solo Rock Vocal Performance; Springsteen won only the last, losing both of the others to U2 songs.

== Music video ==
A music video of "Devils & Dust" was filmed at an empty Paramount Theatre in Asbury Park, New Jersey. It featured Springsteen on stage lip-synching the song on just acoustic guitar and harmonica. Appearance of the other instruments on the audio was unexplained, and no attempt was made to illustrate the setting or themes of the song, other than a held camera shot from behind the stage at the end as Springsteen put down his instruments and walked off, empty seats all to be seen.

== Live performance history ==
"Devils & Dust" was performed by Springsteen on several promotional television appearances, using just acoustic guitar and harmonica. When Springsteen eschewed accompanying musicians for the Devils & Dust Tour, which began in April 2005, a solo "Devils & Dust" it was to be. Opinions differed on whether the song benefited from the focused intensity of this treatment or suffered from its shifting themes no longer being illustrated by the arrangement. After the tour's completion, Springsteen returned to give another solo performance of the song in February 2006 at the Grammy Awards of 2006 show in Los Angeles; the performance was preceded by a glowing introduction from actor Tom Hanks and immediately followed by a brief editorial exclamation from Springsteen, "Bring 'em home!" making reference to his desire for withdrawal of U.S. troops from Iraq.

During the 2006 Sessions Band Tour, Springsteen played "Devils & Dust" intermittently, this time with something resembling the recording's arrangement but cast in the Sessions Band's "big folk" sound. Audience reaction was generally very strong.

"Devils & Dust" has made a few rare appearances in subsequent E Street Band shows: once during the Magic Tour in 2008 and twice (one performance in St. Paul being with the full band) during the Wrecking Ball Tour in 2012.

== Personnel ==
Personnel taken from Devils & Dust album liner notes.

- Bruce Springsteen – vocals, guitar, keyboards
- Brendan O'Brien – bass
- Steve Jordan – drums
- Nashville String Machine – strings
- Susan Welty – horns
- Thomas Witte – horns

== Charts ==
Weekly chart performance for "Devils and Dust"
Chart (2005)	Peak position
US Billboard Hot 100	76
US Adult Alternative Airplay (Billboard)	5

== See also ==
- List of anti-war songs
