= The Sessions Band =

American musical group

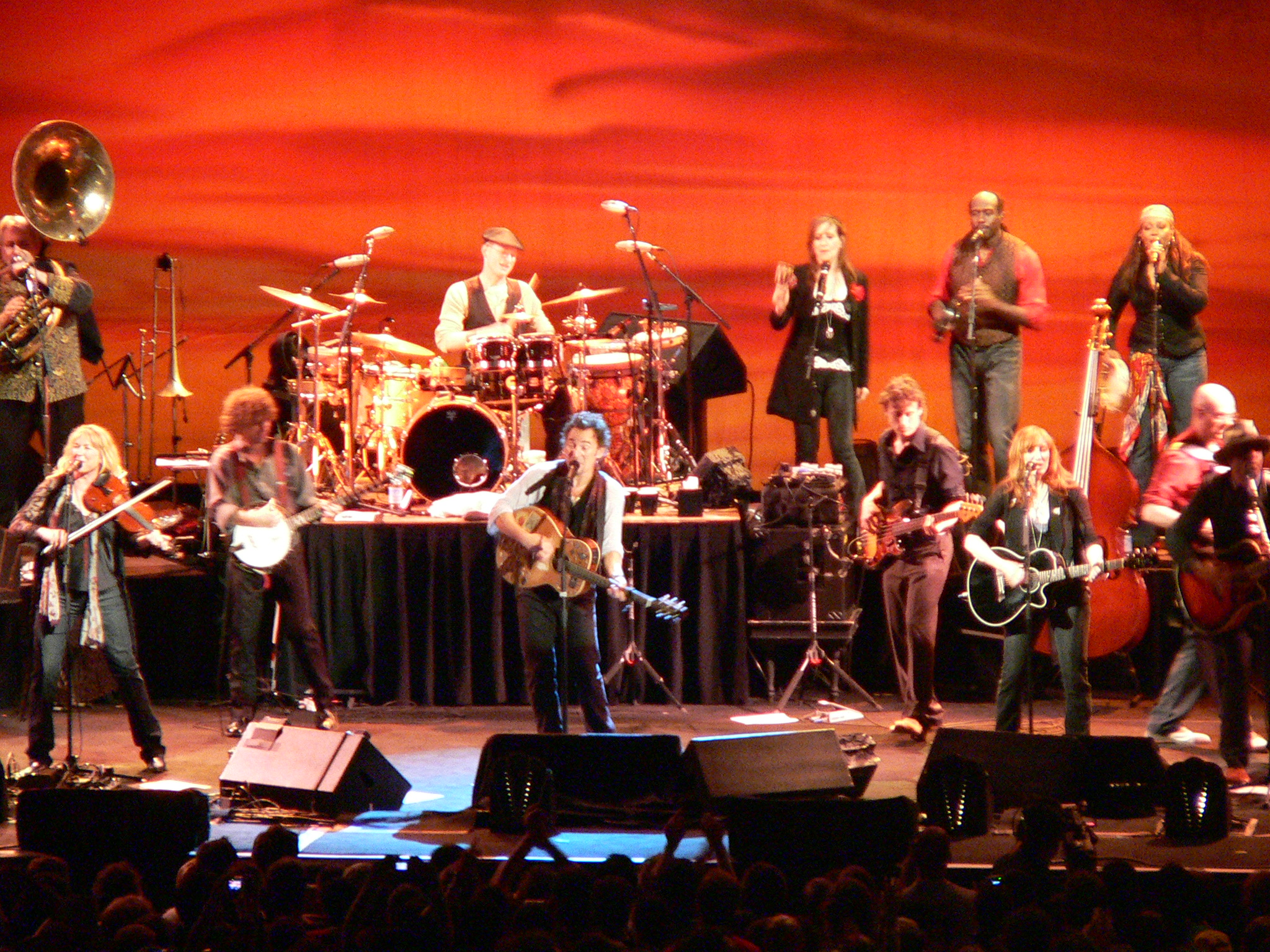
Bruce Springsteen and The Sessions Band performing in Milan in 2006

The Sessions Band is an American musical group that has periodically recorded and toured with American rock singer-songwriter Bruce Springsteen in various formations since 1997.

== History ==
The Sessions Band was first formed in October 1997. That September, Bruce Springsteen organized a fiesta-themed party at his Colts Neck, New Jersey farm and invited the New York–based band The Gotham Playboys to provide entertainment. The next month, Springsteen was invited to donate a recording to an upcoming tribute album to folk singer Pete Seeger. He re-contacted the Playboys and some additional musicians whom he knew through E Street Band violinist Soozie Tyrell, and recorded a number of songs on November 2, 1997. These included "We Shall Overcome", which was released on the 1998 tribute album, Where Have All The Flowers Gone: The Songs Of Pete Seeger.

The group was then disbanded for an extended period. In late 2004, while reviewing material for a possible follow-up to his Tracks box set, Springsteen stumbled upon these recordings and decided to release them as a stand-alone project. There was not enough material, however, so he reformed the band for what would become known as the Second Seeger Session on March 19, 2005. The third and, so far, final Seeger Session took place on January 21, 2006.

In April 2006, the album was released as We Shall Overcome: The Seeger Sessions (so titled as each of the album's thirteen songs had been previously recorded or performed by Pete Seeger). The subsequent Bruce Springsteen with The Seeger Sessions Band Tour took this musical approach even further, with a travelling group partly composed of musicians from the sessions.

In October 2006, the album was reissued as We Shall Overcome: The Seeger Sessions – American Land Edition with five additional tracks. The album won the Grammy Award for Best Traditional Folk Album at the 49th Grammy Awards held in February 2007, and had sold 700,000 copies in the United States by January 2009; the RIAA certified it with gold record status.

Members of the Sessions Band occasionally guested on Springsteen and the E Street Band's 2007–2008 Magic Tour. After E Street Band organist Danny Federici ceased touring with the band due to melanoma in November 2007, and his subsequent death in April 2008, Sessions Band member Charles Giordano joined the E Street Band for the remainder of the Magic Tour and has been with the band ever since.

On Springsteen's 2009 Working on a Dream Tour with the E Street Band, Giordano was joined in the touring band by Sessions Band members Cindy Mizelle and Curtis King, who sang backup vocals. Curt Ramm also toured with the E Street Band for much of the final leg of the tour, playing trumpet on select songs. On Springsteen's 2012 Wrecking Ball Tour, Giordano, Mizelle, and King were joined in full-time roles by Ramm on trumpet, Ed Manion on saxophone, and Clark Gayton on trombone. Other members of the band occasionally guested at shows on the Working on a Dream Tour. Sam Bardfeld along with a string section that he fronted, appeared at a few shows on Springsteen's The River Tour 2016. Springsteen has indicated he would like to do another project with the Sessions Band in the future.

On May 16, 2015, Springsteen reunited with a version of the Sessions Band for a four-song set at the Kristen Ann Carr Fund's "A Night To Remember" event in tribute to Thom Zimny at Tribeca Grill in New York City. The band, billed for the evening as the Tribeca Playboys, consisted of Charles Giordano on accordion, Jeremy Chatzky on upright bass, Larry Eagle on drums, Sam Bardfeld and Soozie Tyrell on fiddle, Losa Lowell on vocals and guitar, Ed Manion on saxophone, and Curt Ramm on trumpet; the group was also joined by guests Nils Lofgren on guitar, Curtis King on vocals, and restaurateur and venue host Drew Nieporent on washboard.

== Band members ==
=== Seeger Sessions Studio Band ===
- Bruce Springsteen – lead vocals, guitar, harmonica, B3 organ, and percussion
- Sam Bardfeld – violin
- Art Baron – sousaphone
- Frank Bruno – guitar
- Jeremy Chatzky – upright bass
- Mark Clifford – banjo
- Larry Eagle – drums and percussion
- Charles Giordano – B3 organ, piano, and accordion
- Ed Manion – saxophone
- Mark Pender – trumpet, backing vocals
- Richie "La Bamba" Rosenberg – trombone, backing vocals
- Patti Scialfa – backing vocals
- Soozie Tyrell – violin, backing vocals
- Lisa Lowell – backing vocals

=== Sessions Band (touring band) ===
The band ranged in size from 17 and 20 members on stage, depending upon availability on a given night. About half the members had played on the Seeger Sessions album, while the other half were new.

- Bruce Springsteen – lead vocals, acoustic guitar, occasional harmonica
- Marc "Chocolate Genius" Thompson – acoustic guitar, background vocals, some featured lead vocals
- Patti Scialfa – acoustic guitar, background vocals, some featured duet vocals
- Frank Bruno – acoustic guitar, some background vocals, occasional drums and washboard
- Soozie Tyrell – violin, background vocals
- Sam Bardfeld – violin
- Greg Liszt – banjo
- Marty Rifkin – pedal steel guitar
- Charles Giordano – accordion, piano, organ
- Jeremy Chatzky – upright bass, occasional electric bass
- Larry Eagle – drums
- Lisa Lowell – background vocals
- Curtis King – background vocals
- Cindy Mizelle – background vocals
- Art Baron – sousaphone, occasional trombone
- Eddie Manion – saxophones
- Mark Pender and/or Curt Ramm – trumpet
- Richie "La Bamba" Rosenberg and/or Clark Gayton – trombone

== Discography ==
- Where Have All The Flowers Gone: The Songs of Pete Seeger (1998)
- We Shall Overcome: The Seeger Sessions (2006)
- We Shall Overcome: The Seeger Sessions - American Land Edition (2006)
- Bruce Springsteen with The Sessions Band: Live in Dublin (2007)
- Give Us Your Poor (2007)
