= Taft Theatre =

Theater in Cincinnati, Ohio, United States

Coordinates: 39.101729°N 84.507732°W

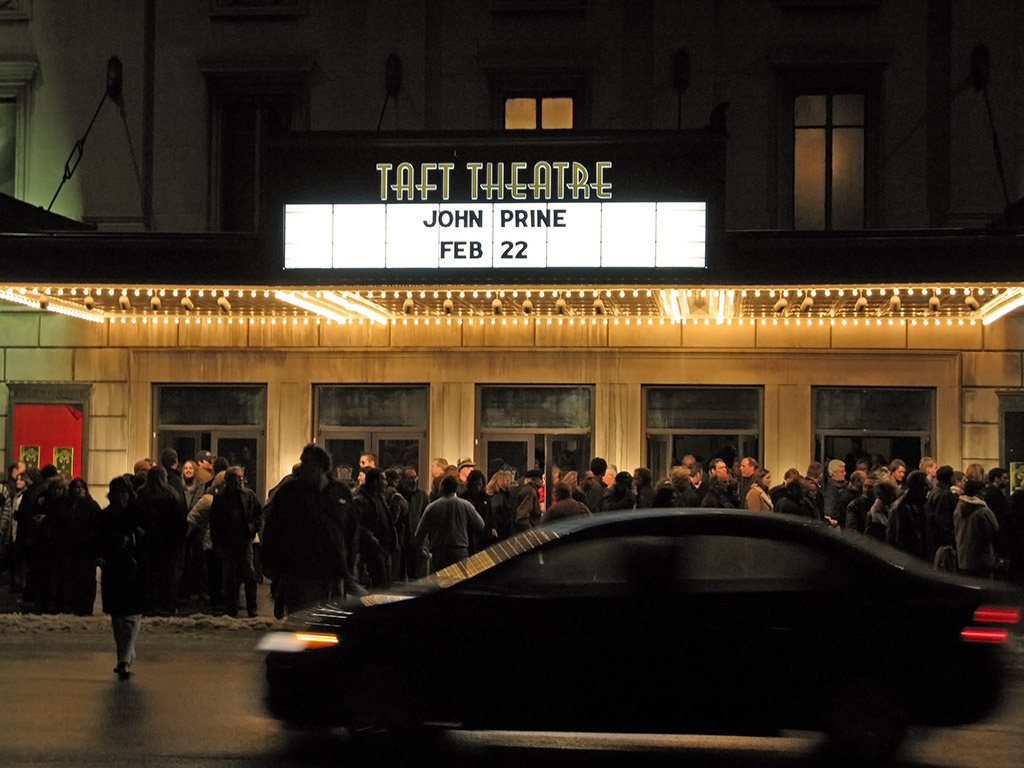
- Exterior of venue (c.2008)
- Interactive map of Taft Theatre
- Address: 317 E 5th St; Cincinnati, OH 45202-3309
- Location: Downtown Cincinnati
- Owner: Scottish Rite
- Operator: Music & Event Mgmt. Inc.; Cincinnati Symphony Orchestra
- Capacity: 2,261
- Designation: Cincinnati Landmark
- Public transit: Connector at 4th & Main

Construction
- Opened: 1928
- Renovated: 2010

Website
- Venue Website

The Taft Theatre is a theater, located in Cincinnati, Ohio. The theatre was built in 1928 with an Art Deco interior.

It is part of the Masonic Temple Building at Fifth and Sycamore streets. In 2010, Music & Event Management Inc., a subsidiary of Cincinnati Symphony Orchestra, took over operation of the theater. Music & Event Management Inc. leased the space from Scottish Rite of Freemasonry, the building's owners.

It is used for Broadway shows, concerts, comedy and other special events.

== Architecture ==
The theater is constructed in both Art Deco and neoclassical styles, and features a warm red-green color scheme inside. All seats are unobstructed, giving every seat a clear view of the stage.

== History ==
Construction on the theater began in 1925, and concluded in 1928. Named for Charles Phelps Taft, William Howard Taft's older brother, the theater hosted the Cincinnati symphony for its dedication in 1928.

Scottish Rite applied for demolition permits to destroy the building twice in the 1960s, although they were unsuccessful both times. They thought the theater was too expensive to renovate, and hoped to replace it with a parking garage.

In 2010, the theatre underwent $3.2 million worth of upgrades and renovations for air conditioning, seating, restroom improvements and other amenities. Funding primarily came from businessman Carl Lindner Jr. and his wife Edyth. The renovation reduced the overall number of seats in the venue from 2,500 to 2,261

== Notable events ==
Musicians including Bob Dylan, Wilco, George Gershwin, Merle Haggard, Vladimir Horowitz, and Marian Anderson have performed in the Taft.

The theatre played host to the politically motivated Vote for Change Tour on October 2, 2004, featuring performances by Keb' Mo', Bonnie Raitt and Jackson Browne.
