= Devils & Dust =

Studio album by Bruce Springsteen
- Released: April 26, 2005
- Recorded: 1996–1998, March–August 2004, January 2005
- Studios: Southern Tracks Recording Studio, Atlanta, Georgia; Thrill Hill Recording, Los Angeles and New Jersey
- Genres: Rock; country rock; folk rock
- Length: 50:55
- Label: Columbia
- Producers: Brendan O'Brien, Bruce Springsteen, Chuck Plotkin (Note: Springsteen and Plotkin only on "All the Way Home", "Long Time Comin'")

Bruce Springsteen chronology
The Essential Bruce Springsteen (2003)	Devils & Dust (2005)	Hammersmith Odeon London '75 (2006)

Singles from Devils & Dust
- 1. "Devils & Dust" Released: March 28, 2005; 2. "All the Way Home" Released: October 31, 2005

Devils & Dust is the thirteenth studio album by the American singer-songwriter Bruce Springsteen, and his third acoustic album (after Nebraska and The Ghost of Tom Joad). It was released on April 25, 2005, in Europe and the following day in the United States, where it debuted at No. 1 on the US Billboard 200 album chart.

== Background ==
Springsteen revealed that many of the songs from Devils & Dust dated back a decade or more. He wrote "All the Way Home" for Southside Johnny to use in his album Better Days (1991). "Long Time Comin'" and "The Hitter" were written and performed on Springsteen's 1996 solo Ghost of Tom Joad Tour. "Devils & Dust" featured in soundchecks during The Rising Tour in 2003. The following year it was on the set list for at least one Vote for Change show, but was swapped out at the last moment for a 12-string guitar rendition of the "Star Spangled Banner", which he would later release for free through his official website.

== Release and promotion ==
On March 28 the title track was featured as an exclusive preview on AOLmusic.com. The next day it was released on iTunes, and also on DualDisc, the DVD side of which featured Springsteen performing and commenting on five tracks: "Devils and Dust", "Long Time Comin'", "Reno", "All I'm Thinkin' About", and "Matamoros Banks". Springsteen embarked on a solo Devils & Dust Tour to promote the album.

Starbucks had been considered a possible retail outlet for the album, as it had accounted for about a quarter of all sales for the recently successful Ray Charles's Genius Loves Company. The company declined, with news coverage citing as reasons the song "Reno", with its reference to anal sex, and Springsteen's refusal to approve a co-branded disc and promotional deal that prominently featured the Starbucks name. "There were a number of factors involved. It [the lyrics] was one of the factors, but not the only reason," Ken Lombard, president of Starbucks Entertainment, told Reuters. At a concert at the Tower Theater in Philadelphia, Springsteen introduced "Reno" by joking that the album would be available "at Dunkin' Donuts and Krispy Kreme stores everywhere." Devils & Dust was Springsteen's first album to be released with a Parental Advisory warning, chiefly due to "Reno".

The album was Springsteen's seventh No. 1, and fourth No. 1 debut, on the Billboard albums chart, his second for an album containing only previously unreleased content, and his first ever without the E Street Band. It went gold in the US in 2006, where it had sold 650,000 copies as of November 2008.

== Critical reception ==
Professional ratings
Aggregate scores
Source	Rating
Metacritic	81/100
Review scores
Source	Rating
AllMusic	4/5 stars
Blender	4/5 stars
Christgau's Consumer Guide	A−
Entertainment Weekly	A−
Drowned in Sound	9/10
Los Angeles Times	4/4 stars
Mojo	5/5 stars
Pitchfork	7.4/10
PopMatters	9/10
Rolling Stone	4.5/5 stars

In a rave review, Rolling Stone lauded the album as being "in striking and affecting ways... Springsteen's most audacious record since the home-demo American Gothic of 1982's Nebraska". The songs are "rendered with a subdued, mostly acoustic flair that smells of wood smoke and sparkles in the right places like stars in a clear Plains sky", David Fricke wrote. "Shocked by the song about sodomy? Wait 'til you hear the Dylan impression" was how The Guardian opened its review, citing the "Reno" lyrics, "Two hundred dollars straight in, two-fifty up the ass", and which it reports Springsteen as having justified with the remark, "It's just what felt right". It found the album to be flawed, but praised that it "rarely does what you expect it to".

Devils and Dust received five Grammy Award nominations, three for the song "Devils & Dust"; Song of the Year and Best Rock Song. Springsteen was nominated for Best Solo Rock Vocal Performance, and the album for Best Contemporary Folk Album and Best Long Form Music Video. He took home the award for Best Solo Rock Vocal, which he had previously won for "Code of Silence" and "The Rising". During the February 8 Grammy telecast, Springsteen gave a live solo performance of "Devils & Dust", adding "Bring 'em home" at the finish, and then immediately turned and left the stage without staying to receive his partial standing ovation.

== Track listing ==
All songs are written by Bruce Springsteen.

No.	Title	Length
1.	"Devils & Dust"	4:58
2.	"All the Way Home"	3:38
3.	"Reno"	4:08
4.	"Long Time Comin'"	4:17
5.	"Black Cowboys"	4:08
6.	"Maria's Bed"	5:35
7.	"Silver Palomino"	3:22
8.	"Jesus Was an Only Son"	2:55
9.	"Leah"	3:32
10.	"The Hitter"	5:53
11.	"All I'm Thinkin' About"	4:22
12.	"Matamoros Banks"	4:00

== Personnel ==
Adapted from the liner notes:

- Bruce Springsteen – vocals, guitar, keyboards (tracks 1–12); bass (track 8), drums (tracks 8, 11), percussion (tracks 2, 5, 7, 9, 10), tambourine (track 3)
- Brendan O'Brien – bass (tracks 1, 2, 4–6, 11), tambora (tracks 2, 6), sitar (track 2), electric sarangi (track 2), hurdy-gurdy (track 6)
- Steve Jordan – drums (tracks 1, 2, 4, 6), percussion (track 5)
- Nashville String Machine – strings (tracks 1, 3, 5, 7, 10, 12)
- Soozie Tyrell – violin (tracks 4, 6), backing vocals (tracks 4, 6, 8, 11)
- Marty Rifkin – steel guitar (tracks 2, 4)
- Susan Welty – horns (tracks 1, 3, 5, 10)
- Thomas Witte – horns (tracks 1, 3, 5, 10)
- Brice Andrus – horns (tracks 3, 5, 10)
- Donald Strand – horns (tracks 3, 5, 10)
- Mark Pender – trumpet (track 9)
- Chuck Plotkin – piano (track 2)
- Danny Federici – keyboards (track 4)
- Patti Scialfa – backing vocals (tracks 4, 6, 8, 11)
- Lisa Lowell – backing vocals (tracks 8, 11)

Technical

- Brendan O'Brien – production (tracks 1–12), mixing (tracks 1–4, 6, 7, 10, 11)
- Bruce Springsteen, Chuck Plotkin – production (tracks 2, 4)
- Toby Scott – recording (tracks 1–12), mixing (tracks 5, 8, 9, 12)
- Nick Didia – recording
- Karl Egsieker – second engineer
- Billy Bowers – additional engineering
- Tom Tapley – additional recording assistant
- Eddie Horst – string & horn arrangements
- Bob Ludwig – mastering
- Chris Austopchuk – art direction
- Dave Bett, Michelle Holme – art direction, design
- Anton Corbijn – photography

== Charts ==
Weekly chart performance for Devils & Dust
Chart (2005)	Peak position
Australian Albums (ARIA)	10
Austrian Albums (Ö3 Austria)	1
Belgian Albums (Ultratop Flanders)	1
Belgian Albums (Ultratop Wallonia)	5
Danish Albums (Hitlisten)	1
Dutch Albums (Album Top 100)	1
Finnish Albums (Suomen virallinen lista)	3
French Albums (SNEP)	3
German Albums (Offizielle Top 100)	1
Hungarian Albums (MAHASZ)	16
Italian Albums (FIMI)	1
New Zealand Albums (RMNZ)	13
Norwegian Albums (VG-lista)	2
Portuguese Albums (AFP)	10
Scottish Albums (Official Charts)	1
Swedish Albums (Sverigetopplistan)	1
Swiss Albums (Schweizer Hitparade)	1
Spanish Albums (Promusicae)	1
UK Albums (Official Charts)	1
US Billboard 200	1

== Certifications and sales ==
Certifications and sales for Devils & Dust
Region	Certification	Certified units/sales
Australia (ARIA)	Gold	35,000^{^}
Austria (IFPI Austria)	Gold	15,000^{*}
Belgium (BRMA)	Gold	25,000^{*}
Canada (Music Canada)	Gold	50,000^{^}
Denmark (IFPI Danmark)	Gold	20,000^{^}
Germany (BVMI)	Gold	100,000^{‡}
Ireland (IRMA)	Platinum	15,000^{^}
Italy sales in 2005	—	120,000
Spain (Promusicae)	Gold	50,000^{^}
Sweden (GLF)	Gold	30,000^{^}
United Kingdom (BPI)	Gold	100,000^{^}
United States (RIAA)	Gold	500,000^{^}
^{*} Sales figures based on certification alone.^{^} Shipments figures based on certification alone.^{‡} Sales+streaming figures based on certification alone.
