= Give US Your Poor =

Give US Your Poor is a compilation album of 19 tracks by Bruce Springsteen & Pete Seeger, Jon Bon Jovi, Madeleine Peyroux, Bonnie Raitt, and other stars, many in collaboration with currently or formerly homeless musicians on benefit CD to fight homelessness.

Two years in the making, this fundraising CD created by Appleseed Recordings and the national Give US Your Poor organization at UMass Boston brings together established musicians, socially committed actors and currently or previously homeless musicians in a collection of mostly exclusive new recordings that address the ongoing crisis of homelessness in America. There are frequent collaborations between the stars, who donated their time and music, and their formerly or currently homeless brethren on songs that often reflect on existence without guaranteed lodging, food, and the simple necessities of human existence.

== Track listing ==
Track	Song title	Performer	Timing	Songwriter/composer
1	Land of 10,000 Homeless—Minnesota	(audio documentary set to music)	4:01	Maria Isa, Turpening, Andrew
2	Show Me the Way	Jon Bon Jovi, Mighty Sam McClain	3:40	Sam McClain, Scott Shetler
3	Baby Don't Let Me Go Homeless	Keb' Mo', Eagle Park Slim	3:14	Autry McNeace, "Eagle Park Slim"
4	There Is No Good Reason	Natalie Merchant	4:45	Nichole Cooper
5	Hobo's Lullaby	Bruce Springsteen and the Sessions Band with Pete Seeger	5:12	Goebel Reeves
6	So Lonely	Sonya Kitchell	5:40	Sonya Kitchell
7	Becky's Tune	Michelle Shocked, Michael Sullivan	3:44	Michael Sullivan
8	Walking the Dog	Bonnie Raitt, Weepin' Willie Robinson	3:48	Rufus Thomas
9	My Name Is Not "Those People" (Spoken, With Music)	Danny Glover	3:22	Julia K. Dinsmore, Andrew Turpening
10	I Think it's Going to Rain Today	Madeleine Peyroux	3:43	Randy Newman
11	Portable Man	Del Goldfarb, John Sebastian	2:52	Delmark Goldfarb
12	Boll Weevil	Dan Zanes, Kyla Middleton	4:09	Lead Belly, John A. Lomax
13	Ink Falling (Father Outside)	Buffalo Tom	3:54	Chris Colbourn, Bill Janovitz, Tom Maginnis, Nick Flynn
14	Stranger Blues	Sweet Honey In The Rock	5:38	Traditional
15	1,000 Miles Away	Jewel	3:50	Jewel Kilcher
16	Impossible Boulevard (spoken, with music)	Tim Robbins	4:38	Klaus Nielsen, Andrew Turpening
17	Feels Like Home	Mario Frangoulis	4:33	Randy Newman
18	When We Left Minneapolis (spoken, with music)	Danny Glover	1:12	Daniel R. Burke, Brian J.Casey, Julia K. Dinsmore
19	Here and Now	Mark Erelli	3:27	Catie Curtis/Mark Erelli
