= Pay Me My Money Down =

Song performed by the Weavers

"Pay Me My Money Down" (Roud 21449, also known as "Pay Me" or "Pay Me, You Owe Me") is a work song originated among the Black stevedores working in the Georgia Sea Islands. It was collected by Lydia Parrish and published in her 1942 book, Slave Songs of the Georgia Sea Islands:

Pay me, Oh pay me,

Pay me my money down.

Pay me or go to jail,

Pay me my money down.

The melody is much older and used in other songs.

It was performed by The Weavers during their influential 1955 Carnegie Hall concerts, and was further popularized by The Kingston Trio on tour starting in 1957. Capitalizing on the Weavers' folk success with the song, Robert Nemiroff and Burt D'Lugoff appropriated the melody unchanged for their pop song Cindy, Oh Cindy, originally recorded in 1956 by Vince Martin and The Tarriers, and quickly covered by Eddie Fisher.

Dan Zanes performed a children's version done calypso-style on his popular 2002 album Night Time.

== Bruce Springsteen version ==
"Pay Me My Money Down"

Single by Bruce Springsteen

from the album We Shall Overcome: The Seeger Sessions
- Released: 2006
- Studio: Thrill Hill Recording
- Genre: Americana, folk
- Length: 4:32
- Label: Columbia
- Producer: Bruce Springsteen

Bruce Springsteen singles chronology
"Devils & Dust" (2005)	"Pay Me My Money Down" (2006)	"Radio Nowhere" (2007)

Music video
- Pay Me My Money Down on Youtube.com

"Pay Me My Money Down" was the first single and video released from Bruce Springsteen's 2006 big band folk album, We Shall Overcome: The Seeger Sessions. It was one of the most popular songs played on Springsteen's subsequent Seeger Sessions Band Tour, where it usually closed out the main set amidst much on-stage hijinks and repetitions. On June 23, 2006, near the end of the American leg of that tour, Springsteen performed the song on Late Night with Conan O'Brien with his E Street Band, along with host Conan O'Brien, the show's band The Max Weinberg 7, and guests Thomas Haden Church and Jimmy Fallon. It was also the only Seeger song to date to return to regular play with the E-Street Band in the later stages of the 2013 Wrecking Ball Tour.

== Other Recordings ==
- "Pay Me You Owe Me" was recorded by the American quintet Bounding Main and released on their 2005 album Maiden Voyage.
