= Soozie Tyrell =

American musician (born 1957)

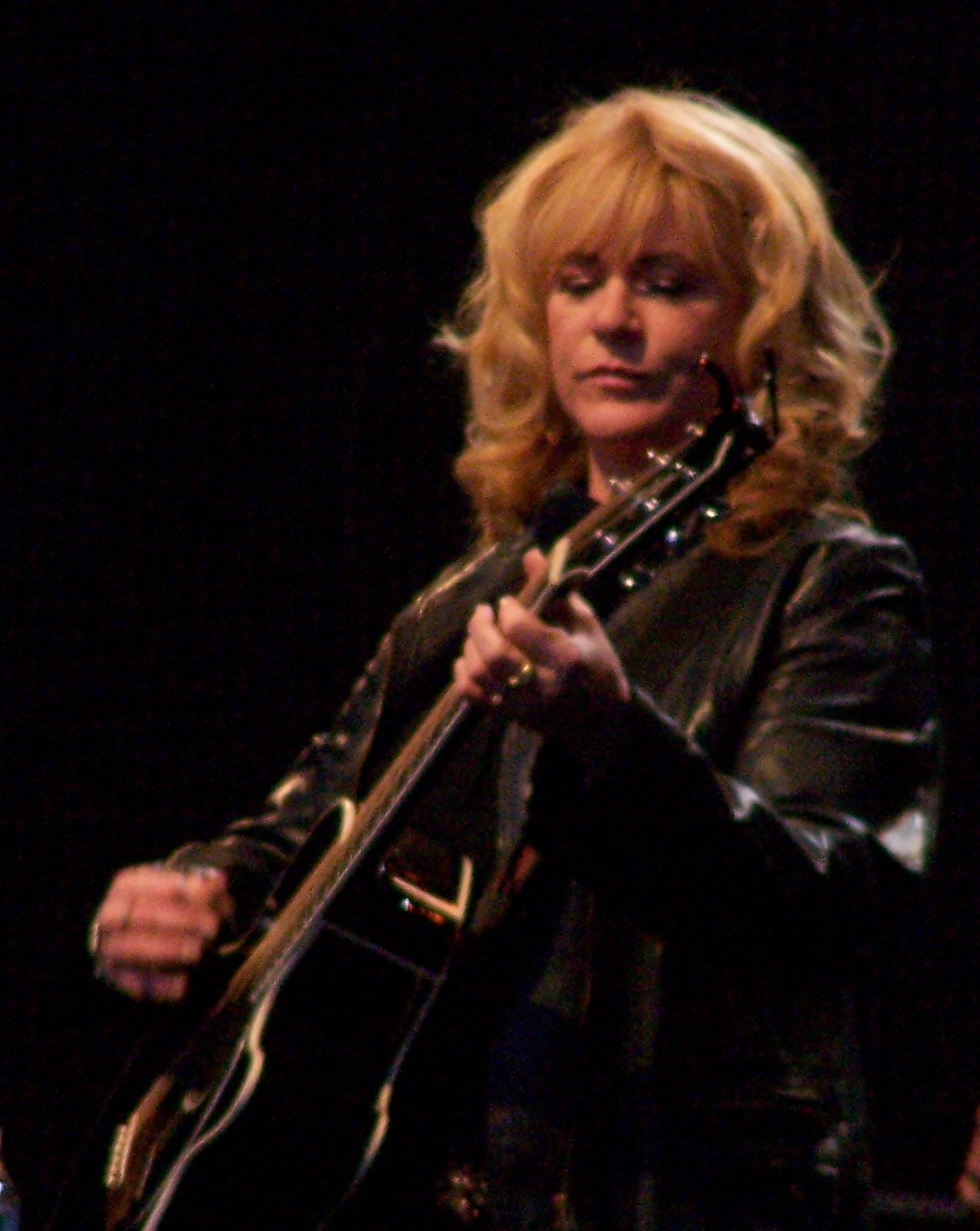
- Tyrell performing with Bruce Springsteen and the E Street Band in August 2009

Background information
- Also known as: Soozie Kirschner
- Born: May 4, 1957 (age 68); Pisa, Italy
- Genres: Rock; folk rock; country
- Instruments: Violin; guitar; vocals
- Labels: Columbia Records; Treasure Records
- Website: www.soozietyrell.com

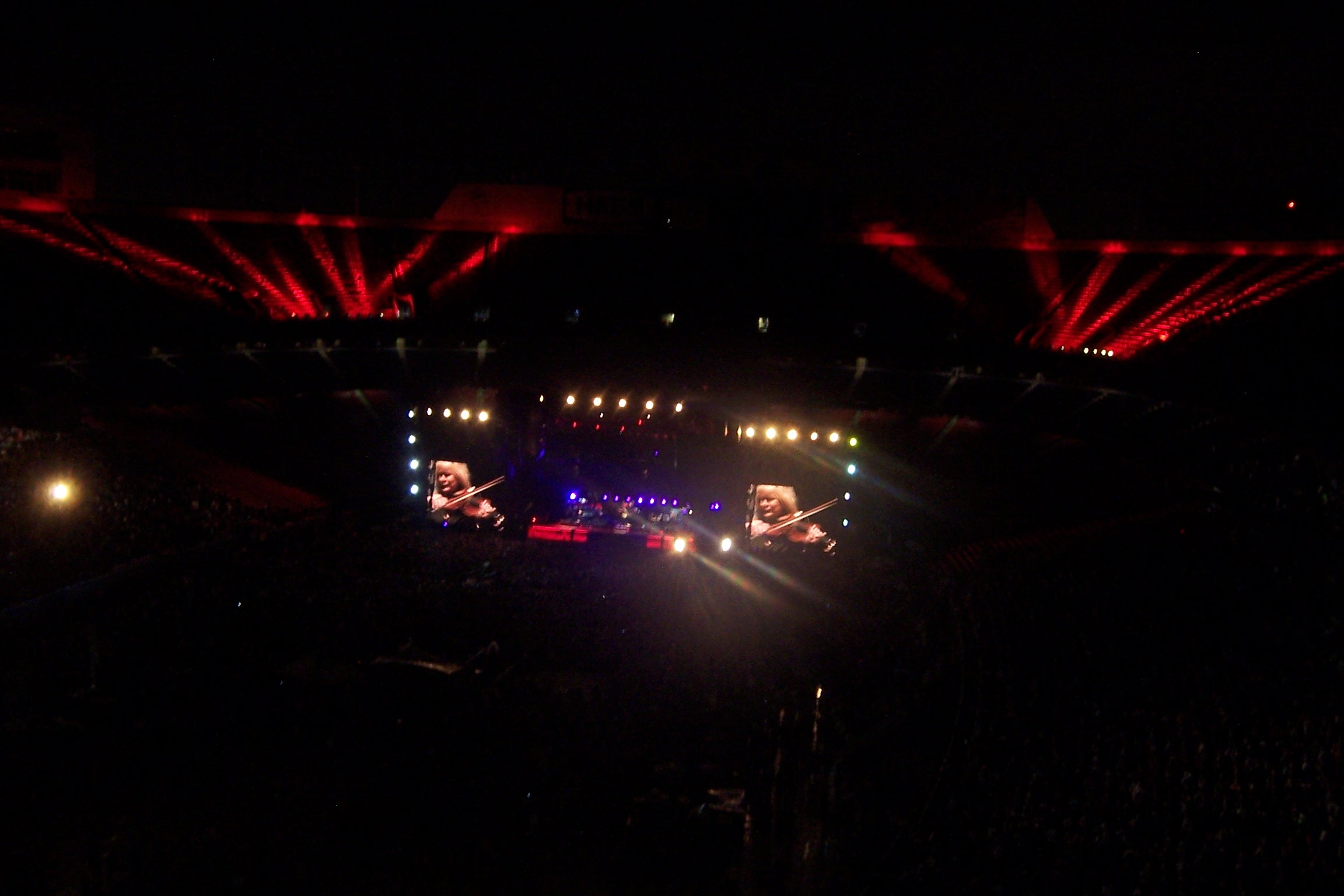
Tyrell's violin play is a crucial part of Springsteen's "The Rising", released in 2002; the song and album reflect on the impact of the September 11 attacks the year before.

Soozie Tyrell (born May 4, 1957), formerly known as Soozie Kirschner, is an American musician, most known for her work with Bruce Springsteen in the E Street Band and formerly the Sessions Band.

== Early life and education ==
Tyrell was born in Pisa, Italy, and as the daughter of a military serviceman travelled extensively, ultimately settling in Florida, where she briefly studied music theory at the University of South Florida in Tampa, Florida.

== Career ==
After leaving the University of South Florida, she relocated to New York City, where she became a street musician for many years. Together with Patti Scialfa and Lisa Lowell, she formed a street group known as Trickster.

Tyrell began appearing on records with Southside Johnny and The Asbury Jukes' Love is a Sacrifice in 1980. She then led her own country and western band, Soozie & High in the Saddle. Beginning in mid-1980s Tyrell worked with David Johansen and his Buster Poindexter alter-ego for fifteen years, appearing on six albums and a number of tours as well as collaborating on the musical Poet's Café. Tyrell, Scialfa and Lowell performed on David Johansen's stage named eponymous first Buster Poindexter album released in 1987 on RCA Records featuring the popular dance hall single, "Hot-Hot-Hot"; their friendship and mutual recording industry projects continue to the present.

Tyrell first appeared with Bruce Springsteen in 1992 on his Lucky Town album, as a backing vocalist. She subsequently performed on every Springsteen album of new studio material since that time, primarily as a violinist and backing singer, including the albums The Ghost of Tom Joad and Devils & Dust, which were not E Street Band albums, making her the musician who has performed on more Springsteen albums in the last twenty years than most of the other members of the E Street Band, with the exception of Patti Scialfa and Springsteen himself.

In 2002, her violin play was incorporated as a key part of the sound on Springsteen's album The Rising, and Tyrell joined the E Street Band for the subsequent 2002–2003 Rising Tour. She also played a prominent role in his non-E Street, big band folk-oriented 2006 album We Shall Overcome: The Seeger Sessions and the subsequent Sessions Band Tour.

She contributed to Springsteen's albums Magic (2007), Working on a Dream (2009), Wrecking Ball (2012), High Hopes (2014), Western Stars (2019) and Only the Strong Survive (2022) and the subsequent Springsteen and the E Street Band's Magic, Working on a Dream, and Wrecking Ball Tours, where she was onstage for every number, playing acoustic guitar in addition to violin, and singing some featured duet parts during absences of bandmate and Springsteen's wife Patti Scialfa. On both the Magic and Working On a Dream Tour, her spot on stage rotated between a riser beside Bittan and in Scialfa's spot when she was not present. Since the Wrecking Ball Tour, she has stood in Clarence Clemons’ vocal role.

In 2003, Tyrell's debut album White Lines was released on Treasure Records.

In 2014, Tyrell was featured on the compilation Songs from a Stolen Spring. On the album she performed "Danger Zone" - a Percy Mayfield song made famous by Ray Charles.

== Discography with Bruce Springsteen ==
- Lucky Town (1992)
- The Ghost of Tom Joad (1995)
- Blood Brothers (1996)
- The Rising (2002)
- The Essential Bruce Springsteen (2003)
- Devils & Dust (2005)
- We Shall Overcome: The Seeger Sessions (2006)
- Bruce Springsteen with The Sessions Band: Live in Dublin (2007)
- Magic (2007)
- Magic Tour Highlights (2008)
- Greatest Hits (2009)
- Working on a Dream (2009)
- The Promise (2010)
- Wrecking Ball (2012)
- High Hopes (2014)
- American Beauty (2014)
- Western Stars (2019)
- Only the Strong Survive (2022)

== Tours with Bruce Springsteen ==
- Guest musician during the 1992-1993 "Other Band" Tour, 1995-1997 Ghost of Tom Joad Tour, and 1999-2000 Reunion Tour
- The Rising Tour with the E Street Band, 2002-2003
- Vote for Change Tour with the E Street Band, 2004
- Seeger Sessions Tour with the Sessions Band, 2006
- Magic Tour with the E Street Band, 2007-2008
- Working On A Dream Tour with the E Street Band, 2009
- Wrecking Ball Tour with the E Street Band, 2012-2013
- High Hopes Tour with the E Street Band, 2014
- The River Tour 2016 with the E Street Band, 2016–2017
- Springsteen and E Street Band 2023 Tour, 2023
