= Vote for Change =

Political 2004 American concert tour

Vote for Change Tour
- Tour by MoveOn.org
- The tour poster, which shared characteristics with Captain America's shield.
- Location: United States
- Start date: September 27, 2004
- End date: October 13, 2004
- Legs: 1
- No. of shows: 40
Bruce Springsteen tour chronology
The Rising Tour (2002–03)	Vote for Change (2004)	Devils & Dust Tour (2005)
Dixie Chicks tour chronology
Top of the World Tour (2003)	Vote for Change (2004)	Accidents & Accusations Tour (2006)
Pearl Jam tour chronology
Riot Act Tour (2003)	Vote for Change (2004)	2005 North American/Latin American Tour (2005)

The Vote for Change tour was a political American popular music concert tour that took place in October 2004. The tour was presented by MoveOn.org to benefit America Coming Together. The tour was held in swing states and was designed to encourage people to register and vote. Though the tour and the organization were officially non-partisan, many of the performers urged people to vote against then-President George W. Bush and for John Kerry in the 2004 presidential election campaign. Bush would defeat Kerry in November 2004.

== Itinerary ==
Every region had a specific night during which the concerts would be held in that region. When concerts were held in the same city, they were at different venues.

== Results ==
The tour was generally successful in attracting audiences, generating media attention and raising approximately $10 million for America Coming Together.

In terms of the tour's effect on the 2004 election, none of the visited states went differently from what had been predicted in pre-election polls. Four of the eight ended up voting in favor of Kerry (Pennsylvania, Michigan, Minnesota, and Wisconsin) while the other four went to Bush (Missouri, Iowa, Florida, and Ohio). The states that had the heaviest tour presence (five or six shows) also split evenly. The result in Ohio was the most critical, as it decided the election in Bush's favor (despite six shows there).

== The shows ==
The Springsteen and E Street Band performances were compressed to two hours in length due to the multi-act nature of the concerts. Especially at the beginning of his sets, Springsteen accomplished this by stripping down the songs, removing elongated outros and false endings from the likes of "Born in the U.S.A." and "Badlands". In doing so, the style of the Vote for Change shows foreshadowed the next E Street outing, the 2007 Magic Tour, when Springsteen adopted a similar approach.

Originals

Greetings from Asbury Park, New Jersey

- "Lost in the Flood"

Born to Run

- "Born to Run" w/ Mike Mills and Peter Buck

Darkness on the Edge of Town

- "Badlands"
- "Darkness on the Edge of Town"
- "The Promised Land" w/ John Fogerty
- "Prove It All Night"
- "Racing in the Street" w/ Jackson Browne

The River

- "The River"
- "The Ties That Bind"

Nebraska

- "Johnny 99"

Born in the U.S.A.

- "Born in the U.S.A."
- "No Surrender"
- "My Hometown" w/ Tracy Chapman

Live/1975–85

- "Because the Night" w/ Michael Stipe

Lucky Town

- "Souls of the Departed" w/ Neil Young

The Ghost of Tom Joad

- "Youngstown"

The Rising

- "Lonesome Day"
- "Mary's Place"
- "The Rising"

Cover songs

- "All Along the Watchtower" w/ Neil Young
- "As Long As I (Can Be With You) w/ Patti Scialfa
- "Bad Day" w/ R.E.M.
- "Bad Moon Rising" w/ John Fogerty
- "Better Man" w/ Eddie Vedder
- "Centerfield" w/ John Fogerty
- "Deja Vu (All Over Again) w/ John Fogerty
- "Fortunate Son" w/ John Fogerty
- "Love (Stand Up)" w/ Patti Scialfa
- "Man on the Moon w/ R.E.M.
- "People Have the Power" w/ entire group of performers
- "Permanent Vacation" w/ R.E.M.
- "Proud Mary" w/ John Fogerty
- "Rockin' in the Free World" w/ Neil Young, R.E.M., John Fogerty, and Pegi Young
- "Running on Empty" w/ Jackson Browne
- "The Star Spangled Banner"
- "Travelin' Band" w/ John Fogerty
- "(What's So Funny 'Bout) Peace, Love and Understanding?" w/ R.E.M, John Fogerty, Bright Eyes, Dixie Chicks, Neil Young and Pegi Young

== Tour dates ==
Date	City	Country	Venue	Attendance	Revenue
North America
September 27, 2004	Seattle	United States	McCaw Hall		
September 29, 2004	Phoenix	United States	Cricket Pavilion		
October 1, 2004	Reading	United States	Sovereign Center		
October 1, 2004	Philadelphia	United States	Wachovia Center	19,353 / 19,353	$1,552,750
October 1, 2004	University Park	United States	Bryce Jordan Center	14,596 / 14,596	$716,562
October 1, 2004	Pittsburgh	United States	Heinz Hall for the Performing Arts		
October 1, 2004	Wilkes-Barre	United States	F.M. Kirby Center for the Performing Arts		
October 2, 2004	Cincinnati	United States	Taft Theatre		
October 2, 2004	Toledo	United States	Toledo Sports Arena		
October 2, 2004	Cleveland	United States	Gund Arena		
October 2, 2004	Cleveland	United States	State Theatre		
October 2, 2004	Fairborn	United States	Nutter Center		
October 2, 2004	Columbus	United States	Promowest Pavilion		
October 3, 2004	East Lansing	United States	Wharton Center for Performing Arts		
October 3, 2004	Walker	United States	DeltaPlex Arena		
October 3, 2004	Detroit	United States	Cobo Arena		
October 3, 2004	Detroit	United States	Fox Theatre		
October 3, 2004	Auburn Hills	United States	The Palace of Auburn Hills	13,181 / 13,181	$607,118
October 3, 2004	Kalamazoo	United States	Wings Stadium		
October 5, 2004	Kansas City	United States	Midland Theatre		
October 5, 2004	Saint Paul	United States	Xcel Energy Center		
October 5, 2004	Madison	United States	Kohl Center		
October 5, 2004	Iowa City	United States	Hancher Auditorium		
October 5, 2004	Milwaukee	United States	Riverside Theater		
October 5, 2004	St.Louis	United States	Fox Theatre		
October 6, 2004	St.Louis	United States	Fox Theatre		
October 6, 2004	Des Moines	United States	Civic Center of Greater Des Moines		
October 6, 2004	Asheville	United States	Asheville Civic Center		
October 6, 2004	Ames	United States	Hilton Coliseum		
October 8, 2004	Jacksonville	United States	Moran Theater		
October 8, 2004	Kissimmee	United States	Silver Spurs Arena		
October 8, 2004	Orlando	United States	TD Waterhouse Centre		
October 8, 2004	Gainesville	United States	O'Connell Center		
October 8, 2004	Clearwater	United States	Ruth Eckerd Hall		
October 8, 2004	Miami Beach	United States	Jackie Gleason Theater		
October 11, 2004	Washington, D.C.	United States	MCI Center	16,769 / 16,769	$1,714,865
October 13, 2004	East Rutherford	United States	Continental Airlines Arena	19,800 / 19,800	$1,687,750

== Performers ==
Performer	Seattle	Phoenix	Reading	Philadelphia	University Park	Pittsburgh	Wilkes-Barre	Cincinnati	Toledo	Cleveland
Babyface							Yes			
Ben Harper					Yes					
Bonnie Raitt	Yes	Yes						Yes		
Bright Eyes				Yes						Yes
Bruce Springsteen				Yes						Yes
Crosby, Stills, Nash & Young		Yes								
Dave Matthews Band					Yes					
Death Cab for Cutie			Yes						Yes	
Dixie Chicks						Yes				
Gob Roberts			Yes						Yes	
Jack Johnson		Yes								
Jackson Browne	Yes	Yes						Yes		
James Taylor						Yes				
John Fogerty				Yes						Yes
John Mellencamp							Yes			
Jurassic 5					Yes					
Keb' Mo'	Yes	Yes						Yes		
My Morning Jacket					Yes					
Neil Young									Yes	
Pearl Jam			Yes						Yes	
Peter Frampton									Yes	
R.E.M.				Yes						Yes

Performer	Fairborn	Cleveland (Theater)	Columbus	East Lansing	Walker	Detroit (Cobo)	Detroit (Fox)	Auburn Hills	Kalamazoo	Kansas City
Babyface			Yes						Yes	
Ben Harper	Yes							Yes		
Bonnie Raitt				Yes						Yes
Bright Eyes						Yes				
Bruce Springsteen						Yes				
Dave Matthews Band	Yes							Yes		
Death Cab for Cutie					Yes					
Dixie Chicks		Yes				Yes	Yes			
Gob Roberts					Yes					
Jackson Browne				Yes						Yes
James Taylor		Yes					Yes			
John Fogerty						Yes				
John Mellencamp			Yes						Yes	
Jurassic 5	Yes							Yes		
Keb' Mo'				Yes						Yes
My Morning Jacket	Yes							Yes		
Neil Young								Yes		
Pearl Jam					Yes					
R.E.M.						Yes				

Performer	St. Louis (October 5)	St. Louis (October 6)	Saint Paul	Madison	Iowa City	Milwaukee	Des Moines	Asheville	Ames	Jacksonville
Babyface						Yes				
Ben Harper				Yes					Yes	
Bonnie Raitt							Yes			Yes
Bright Eyes			Yes							
Bruce Springsteen			Yes							
Dave Matthews Band				Yes					Yes	
Death Cab for Cutie	Yes							Yes		
Dixie Chicks		Yes			Yes					
Gob Roberts	Yes							Yes		
James Taylor		Yes			Yes					
John Fogerty			Yes							
John Mellencamp						Yes				
John Prine							Yes			
Jurassic 5				Yes					Yes	
Keb' Mo'							Yes			Yes
My Morning Jacket				Yes					Yes	
Neil Young			Yes						Yes	
Pearl Jam	Yes							Yes		
R.E.M.			Yes							
Sheryl Crow										Yes

Performer	Kissimmee	Orlando	Gainesville	Clearwater	Miami Beach	Washington, D.C.	East Rutherford
Babyface					Yes	Yes	
Ben Harper			Yes				
Bonnie Raitt						Yes	
Bruce Springsteen		Yes				Yes	Yes
Dave Matthews Band			Yes			Yes	
Death Cab for Cutie	Yes						
Dixie Chicks				Yes		Yes	
Eddie Vedder							Yes
Gob Roberts	Yes						
Jackson Browne						Yes	Yes
James Taylor				Yes		Yes	
John Fogerty		Yes				Yes	Yes
John Mellencamp					Yes	Yes	
Jurassic 5			Yes			Yes	
Keb' Mo'						Yes	
Neil Young	Yes						
Patti Scialfa							Yes
Pearl Jam	Yes					Yes	
Peter Frampton	Yes						
R.E.M.		Yes				Yes	
Tracy Chapman		Yes					
