= Patti Scialfa =

American singer (born 1953)

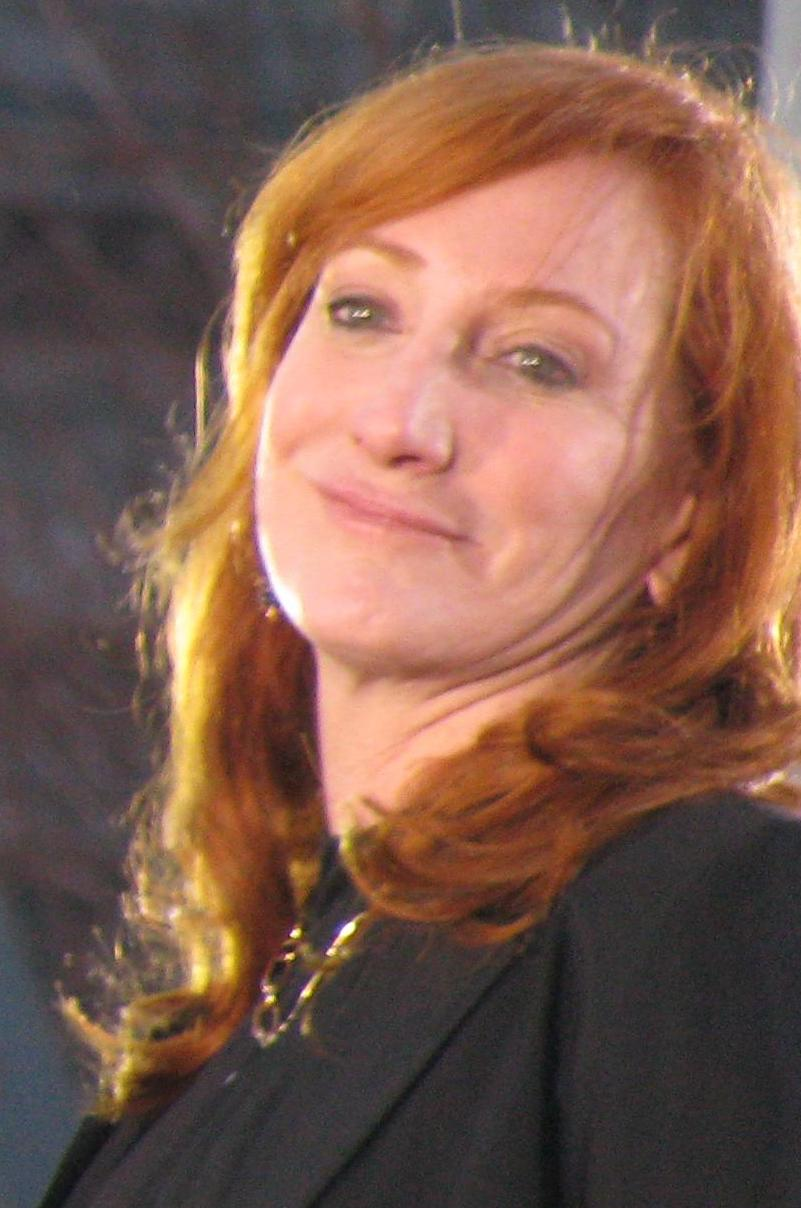
- Scialfa in 2008

Background information
- Born: Vivienne Patricia Scialfa; July 29, 1953 (age 73)
- Origin: Deal, New Jersey, U.S.
- Genres: Rock
- Occupations: Singer-songwriter, musician
- Instruments: Guitar, piano, vocals, percussions
- Years active: Late 1970s–present
- Label: Columbia
- Member of: E Street Band
- Spouse: Bruce Springsteen (m. 1991)

Vivienne Patricia Scialfa (/ˈskælfə/ SKAL-fə; born July 29, 1953) is an American singer-songwriter and guitarist. Scialfa has been a member of the E Street Band since 1984 and has been married to Bruce Springsteen since 1991. In 2014, Scialfa was inducted into the Rock and Roll Hall of Fame as a member of the E Street Band.

== Early life and education ==
Scialfa grew up in Deal, New Jersey, on the Jersey Shore. She was the middle child of Patricia (née Morris) Scialfa and Joseph Scialfa. Her mother is Irish; from Belfast, Northern Ireland. Her father was of Sicilian ancestry. She also has half-siblings from her father's second marriage. Her father was a successful local entrepreneur, who started a television store and became a real estate developer. Scialfa began writing songs at an early age.

She attended Asbury Park High School, where she graduated in 1971. Following high school, she first began working as a back-up singer for New Jersey bar bands.

She began college at the University of Miami's jazz conservatory at the Frost School of Music, and later transferred to New York University, where she earned an undergraduate degree in music.

In 1994, she told Lear's magazine that she had little talent for anything but music and that she attended college as a way to further her ambitions as a performer while also satisfying parental expectations.

== Career ==
While in college at the University of Miami and later at New York University, Scialfa began writing original music for other artists. However, none of her songs were recorded.

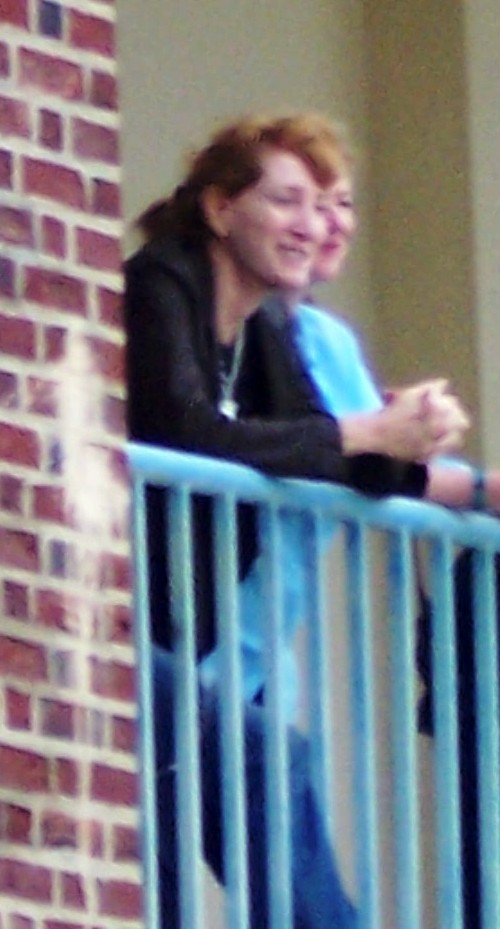
Scialfa and Soozie Tyrell at Asbury Park Convention Hall in September 2004

After her college graduation, she worked as a busker and waitress in Greenwich Village. Together with Soozie Tyrell and Lisa Lowell, she formed a street group known as Trickster. For many years, she struggled to make her way in the songwriting and recording industry in New York City and New Jersey before playing at Folk City and Kenny's Castaways in Greenwich Village and The Stone Pony in Asbury Park, New Jersey. Scialfa had a brief role in The Stone Pony's house band Cats on a Smooth Surface. These gigs won her notice and, eventually, recording work with Southside Johnny and David Johansen.

In 1984, Scialfa joined the E Street Band, three or four days before the opening show of the Born in the U.S.A. Tour. In 1986, she appeared on the Rolling Stones' Dirty Work album, leaving her vocal mark on "One Hit (To the Body)" as well as other tracks. She worked with Keith Richards on his first solo album Talk Is Cheap. Steve Jordan, who co-produced the Richards record, was a friend of Scialfa's from her Greenwich Village days.

Scialfa's music industry friendships with Soozie Tyrell and Lisa Lowell are long-standing, pre-dating their mutual work as background vocalists and musicians on the 1987 Buster Poindexter album, featuring a Soca song by Arrow, "Hot Hot Hot". Lowell and Tyrell have since worked on various Springsteen-Scialfa recording projects and Tyrell, a violinist, has recorded and toured with Springsteen and the E Street Band.

Scialfa has recorded three solo albums, 1993's Rumble Doll, 2004's 23rd Street Lullaby and 2007's Play It as It Lays. Her first two albums received four-star reviews from Rolling Stone, while the third received three and a half stars. Her records are a mix of confessional songwriting, impressive vocal range, and traditional country, folk and rock music. Springsteen and fellow E Street bandmates, like Nils Lofgren and Roy Bittan, have contributed to her albums. Following the release of Scialfa's second album, she played a series of club dates on the East Coast and was the opening act of the post-final night of the Vote for Change tour.

In 2009 and again in 2011, Scialfa confirmed that she had written most of the songs for her fourth album and was trying to find the time to record it.

== Personal life ==
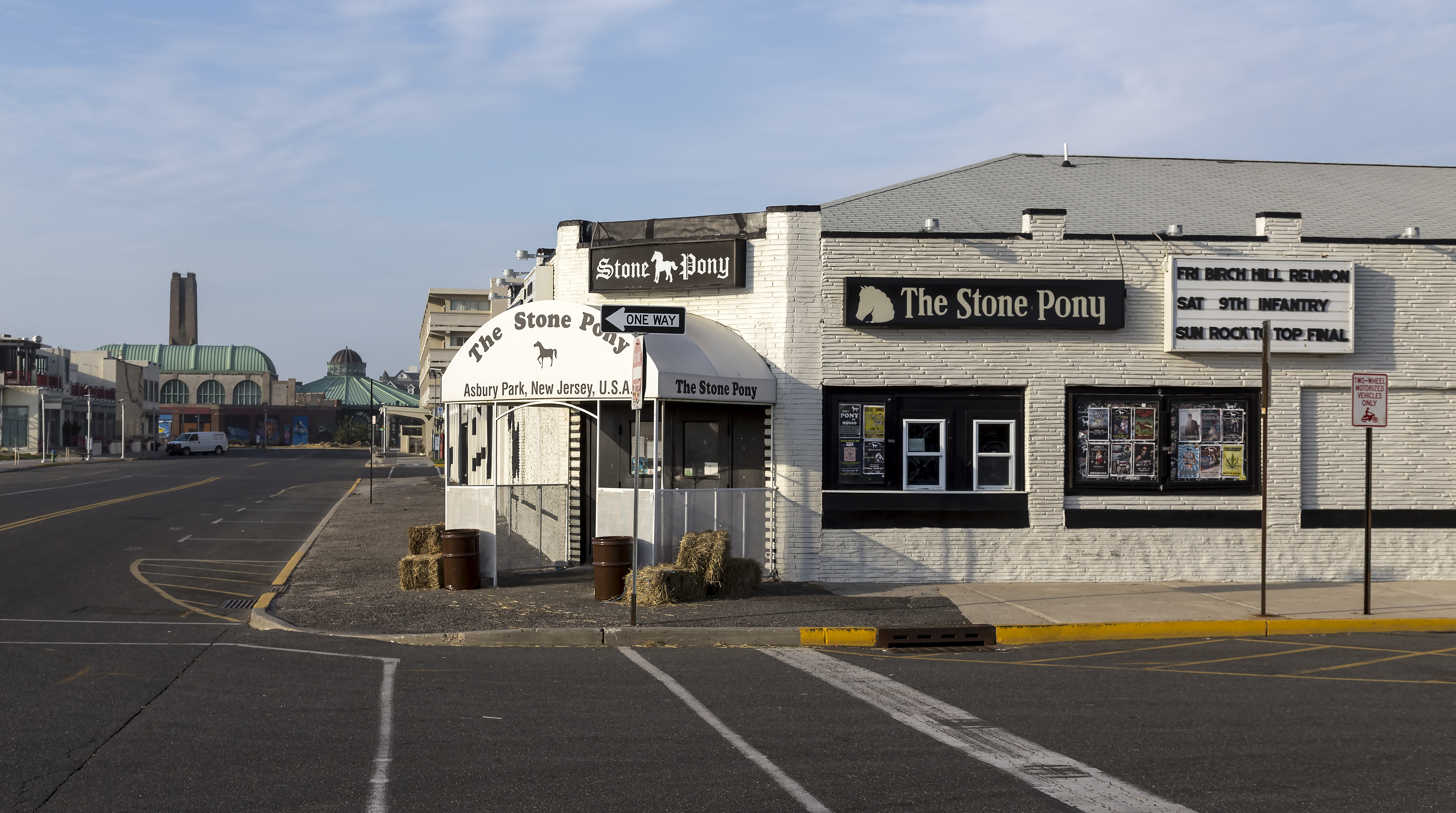
The Stone Pony, a live music club and bar in Asbury Park, New Jersey, where Scialfa first met Bruce Springsteen in the early 1980s

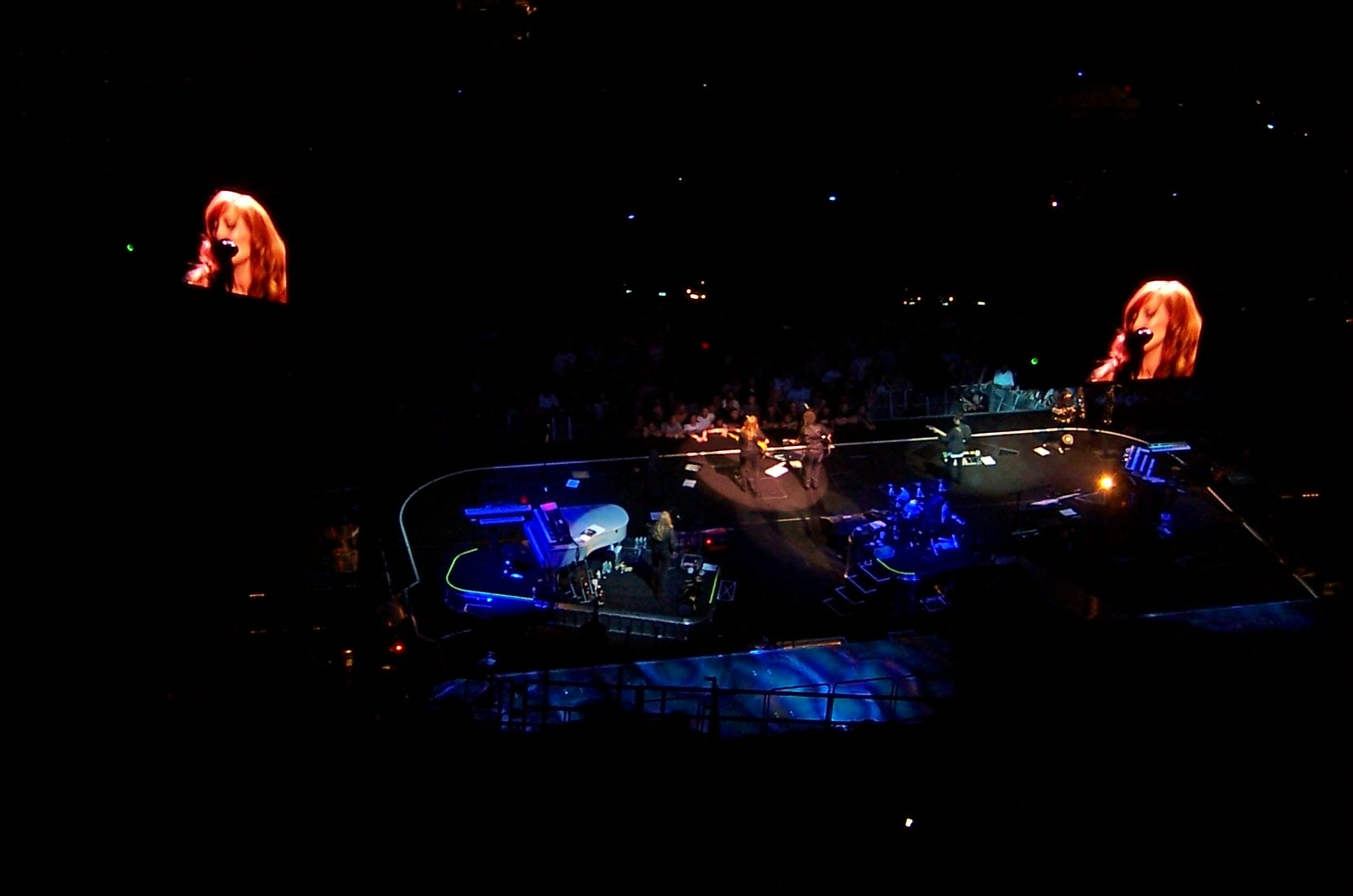
Scialfa performing with Springsteen and the E Street Band at Hartford Civic Center in October 2007

Scialfa first met Bruce Springsteen in the early 1980s at The Stone Pony, a music venue and bar in Asbury Park, New Jersey, where Springsteen and his band regularly played. In 1984, Scialfa postponed recording her solo record to join Springsteen's Born in the U.S.A. Tour. After the tour, Scialfa started a short-term relationship with actor Tom Cruise.

In August 1988, Springsteen's first wife Julianne Phillips filed for divorce, and Scialfa and Springsteen started living together afterward in New Jersey and later in New York City before relocating to Los Angeles, where they started a family. Springsteen and Phillips's divorce was finalized in 1989.

On July 25, 1990, Scialfa gave birth to the couple's first child, Evan James Springsteen. Scialfa and Springsteen married on June 8, 1991, at their Los Angeles home in a ceremony attended by family and close friends. Their second child, Jessica Rae Springsteen, was born December 30, 1991, and their third child, Samuel Ryan Springsteen, was born January 5, 1994. The family returned to New Jersey in the early 1990s and now lives in Colts Neck, New Jersey. They also own homes in Wellington, Florida, near West Palm Beach, and Los Angeles.

On July 17, 2022, Scialfa and Springsteen became first-time grandparents with the birth of their granddaughter Lily Harper Springsteen, daughter of their son Sam.

In September 2024, Scialfa revealed that she was diagnosed with multiple myeloma in 2018. On July 31, 2026, Springsteen revealed that she was in remission.

== Discography ==
- Rumble Doll (1993)
- 23rd Street Lullaby (2004) – (#152, US Billboard 200)
- Play It As It Lays (2007) – (#90, US Billboard 200)
- Contributed a song called "Children's Song" to the charity album Every Mother Counts, the song is a duet with her husband, Bruce Springsteen (2011)
- "Linda Paloma" (from the album Looking into You: A Tribute To Jackson Browne), a duet with Bruce Springsteen (2014).
