= Bruce Springsteen discography =

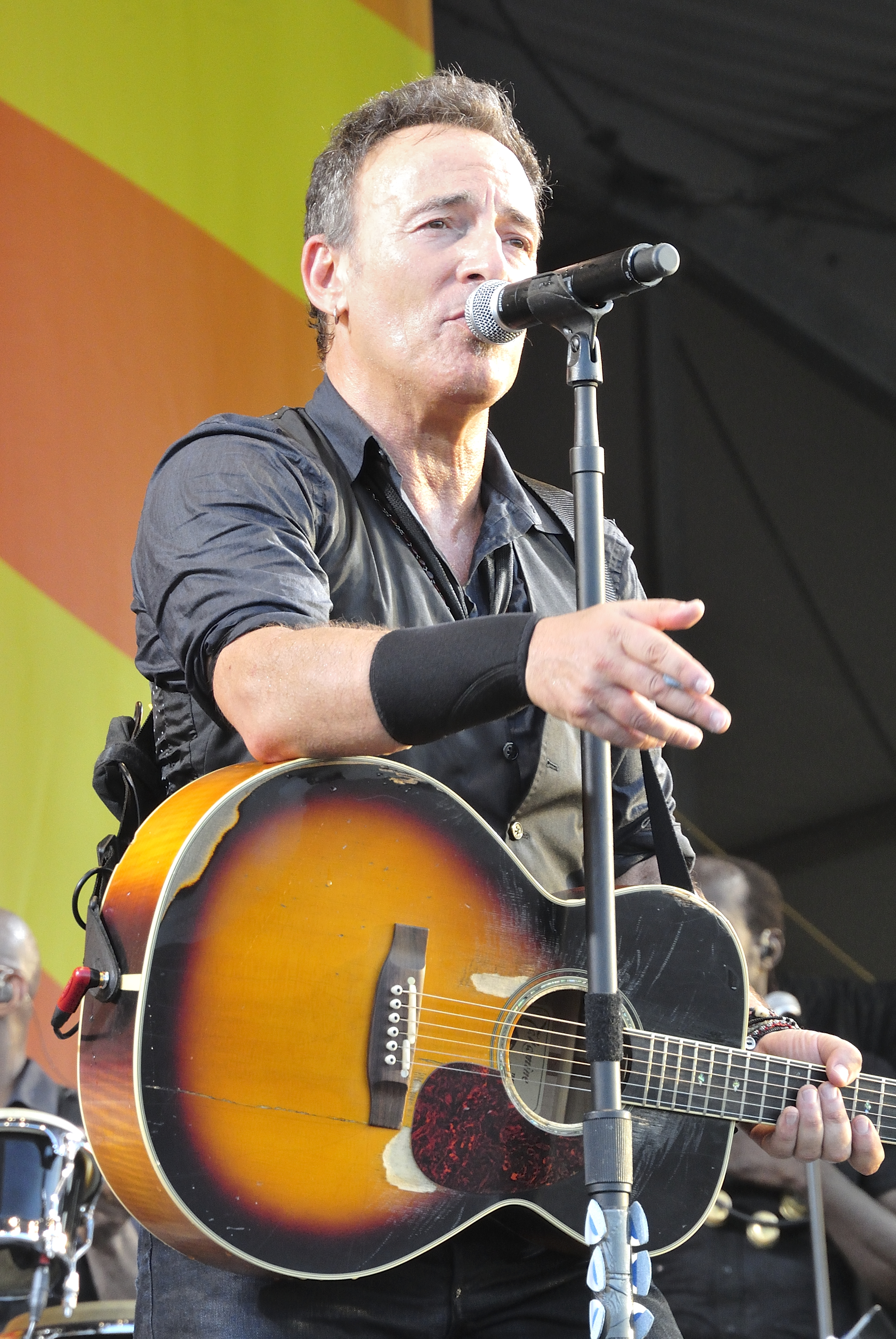
- Springsteen performing with The E Street Band at the New Orleans Jazz & Heritage Festival in 2012
- Studio albums: 21
- Extended plays: 9
- Soundtrack albums: 2
- Live albums: 121
- Compilation albums: 10
- Tribute albums: 17
- Singles: 76
- Video albums: 33
- Music videos: 68
- Box sets: 10

Referred to as "The Boss", Bruce Springsteen is one of the best-selling music artists in history with over 150 million records sold as of December 2021. Billboard ranked him as the 24th Greatest Artist of all time. According to Recording Industry Association of America, he has sold 65.5 million albums in the United States, making him the 7th best-selling male soloist of all time. Born in the U.S.A., the best-selling album of his career, sold more than 30 million copies around the world.

Springsteen has released records steadily since 1973, and is widely known for combining 1950s and 1960s rock 'n' roll musical styles with heartland rock, poetic lyrics, and American culture sentiments centered on his native New Jersey. The E Street Band has been Springsteen's primary backing band since 1972 and has appeared on a majority of his studio albums and live releases. Springsteen also released one studio and live album with the Sessions Band.

Springsteen's recordings have tended to alternate between commercially accessible rock albums and somber folk-oriented works. His most commercially successful period occurred between 1975's Born to Run and 1987's Tunnel of Love. 1984's Born in the U.S.A. launched Springsteen into superstardom and the album went on to become one of the biggest selling albums of all time. It produced seven top-10 hit singles, tied for the most ever with Michael Jackson's Thriller and Janet Jackson's Rhythm Nation 1814. Springsteen has steadily maintained a loyal audience since his 80s success and experienced a renewed commercial strength since 2002's The Rising, the first in a string of consecutive successful albums following a 1999 reunion with the E Street Band with whom he parted ways in 1989. 2014's High Hopes was Springsteen's eleventh No. 1 album placing him at third all-time for most No. 1 albums ever trailing only the Beatles (19) and Jay-Z (13). He achieved his eleventh No. 1 album in the UK with his next release, 2019's Western Stars, which saw him join Elvis Presley, David Bowie and Robbie Williams on eleven UK No. 1s, trailing only the Beatles (15) and Madonna (12). In October 2019, Springsteen released a theatrical film for Western Stars which marked his directorial debut. The film was accompanied by the Western Stars – Songs from the Film soundtrack. In 2020, Springsteen released his twentieth studio album Letter to You which was his first since 2014's High Hopes to feature the E Street Band. The album became Springsteen's twenty-first top ten album in the United States (the album made its debut at number two) making Springsteen the first artist ever with top five-charting albums in each of the last six decades. Springsteen's twenty-first and latest album, Only the Strong Survive, was released in 2022. In June 2025, Springsteen released the box set Tracks II: The Lost Albums, which features seven full length unreleased albums that were recorded from 1983 to 2018.

Overall, Springsteen has released 21 studio albums, 76 singles, 9 extended plays, 121 live albums, 10 box sets, 10 compilation albums, 2 soundtracks, 68 music videos and 32 home videos/video albums. In 2014, Springsteen opened the Bruce Springsteen Archives and announced that he will release various shows from his past that have been digitally restored and remastered and, unlike the bootleg releases, officially endorsed by Springsteen himself.

== Albums ==
=== Studio albums ===
List of albums, with selected chart positions, and certifications
Title	Album details	Peak chart positions										Certifications
Title	Album details	US	AUS	CAN	GER	IRE	NLD	NZ	NOR	SWE	UK	Certifications
Greetings from Asbury Park, N.J.	Released: January 5, 1973; Label: Columbia; Format: LP, cassette, CD, 8-track	60	71	—	—	—	—	—	—	35	41	US: 2× Platinum; AUS: Gold; UK: Silver
The Wild, the Innocent & the E Street Shuffle	Released: November 5, 1973; Label: Columbia; Format: LP, cassette, CD, 8-track	59	60	—	—	—	—	—	—	34	33	US: 2× Platinum; AUS: Gold; UK: Silver
Born to Run	Released: August 25, 1975; Label: Columbia; Format: LP, cassette, CD, MD, 15″ PS reel to reel, 8-track	3	7	31	—	20	7	28	26	7	17	US: 7× Platinum; AUS: 2× Platinum; CAN: 2× Platinum; NLD: Gold; NZ: Platinum; UK: Platinum
Darkness on the Edge of Town	Released: June 2, 1978; Label: Columbia; Format: LP, cassette, CD, MD, reel to reel, 8-track	5	9	7	—	73	4	11	12	9	14	US: 3× Platinum; AUS: Platinum; CAN: Platinum; NLD: Gold; NZ: Gold; UK: Gold
The River	Released: October 17, 1980; Label: Columbia; Format: 2 LP, cassette, 2 CD, 8-track	1	8	1	31	4	2	2	1	2	2	US: 5× Platinum; AUS: 3× Platinum; CAN: 2× Platinum; GER: Gold; NZ: 2× Platinum; UK: Platinum
Nebraska	Released: September 30, 1982; Label: Columbia; Format: LP, cassette, CD, 8-track	3	8	3	37	78	7	3	3	2	3	US: Platinum; AUS: Platinum; CAN: Gold; NZ: Platinum; UK: Silver
Born in the U.S.A.	Released: June 4, 1984; Label: Columbia; Format: LP, cassette, CD, MD, 8-track	1	1	1	1	11	1	1	1	1	1	US: Diamond (17× Platinum); AUS: 14× Platinum; CAN: Diamond; GER: 2× Platinum; NZ: 16× Platinum; UK: 3× Platinum
Tunnel of Love	Released: October 5, 1987; Label: Columbia; Format: LP, cassette, CD, MD, 8-track	1	5	1	3	55	4	6	1	1	1	US: 3× Platinum; AUS: 2× Platinum; CAN: 3× Platinum; GER: Gold; NLD: 2× Platinum; NZ: Platinum; SWE: Platinum; UK: Platinum
Human Touch	Released: March 27, 1992; Label: Columbia; Format: LP, cassette, CD, MD	2	3	2	2	1	3	5	1	1	1	US: Platinum; AUS: Gold; CAN: 2× Platinum; GER: Gold; NZ: Gold; SWE: Platinum; UK: Gold
Lucky Town	Released: March 27, 1992; Label: Columbia; Format: LP, cassette, CD, MD	3	6	3	4	2	7	6	2	3	2	US: Platinum; AUS: Gold; CAN: 2× Platinum; GER: Gold; NZ: Gold; SWE: Platinum; UK: Gold
The Ghost of Tom Joad	Released: November 21, 1995; Label: Columbia; Format: LP, cassette, CD, MD	11	27	15	22	14	17	47	4	3	16	US: Gold; AUS: Gold; CAN: Gold; NOR: Gold; UK: Gold
The Rising	Released: July 30, 2002; Label: Columbia; Format: 2 LP, CD, cassette	1	4	1	1	2	1	12	1	1	1	US: 2× Platinum; AUS: Platinum; GER: Platinum; NLD: Gold; NZ: Platinum; NOR: Platinum; SWE: 2× Platinum; UK: Platinum
Devils & Dust	Released: April 26, 2005; Label: Columbia; Format: 2 LP, CD, cassette	1	10	2	1	1	1	13	2	1	1	US: Gold; AUS: Gold; CAN: Gold; GER: Gold; IRE: Platinum; NZ: Gold; SWE: Gold; UK: Gold
We Shall Overcome: The Seeger Sessions	Released: April 25, 2006; Label: Columbia; Format: LP, CD	3	21	3	5	2	2	12	1	1	3	US: Gold; CAN: Gold; GER: Gold; IRE: 2× Platinum; SWE: Gold
Magic	Released: September 25, 2007; Label: Columbia; Format: LP, CD	1	2	1	3	1	2	2	1	1	1	US: Platinum; AUS: Gold; GER: Gold; IRE: 3× Platinum; NZ: Gold; SWE: 2× Platinum; UK: Gold
Working on a Dream	Released: January 27, 2009; Label: Columbia; Format: 2 LP, CD	1	3	1	1	1	1	1	1	1	1	US: Gold; CAN: Platinum; GER: Gold; IRE: 2× Platinum; NLD: Gold; SWE: Platinum; UK: Gold
Wrecking Ball	Released: March 6, 2012; Label: Columbia; Format: 2 LP, CD	1	2	3	1	1	1	1	1	1	1	US: Gold; AUS: Gold; CAN: Gold; GER: Platinum; SWE: Platinum
High Hopes	Released: January 14, 2014; Label: Columbia; Format: 2 LP, CD	1	1	1	1	1	1	1	1	1	1	AUS: Gold; IRE: Gold; NZ: Gold; SWE: Gold; UK: Gold
Western Stars	Released: June 14, 2019; Label: Columbia; Format: 2 LP, CD	2	1	4	1	1	1	1	1	3	1	GER: Gold; UK: Gold
Letter to You	Released: October 23, 2020; Label: Columbia; Format: 2 LP, CD	2	1	2	2	1	1	1	1	1	1	GER: Gold; UK: Gold
Only the Strong Survive	Released: November 11, 2022; Label: Columbia; Format: LP, CD	8	3	8	1	2	1	4	1	1	2	UK: Silver
"—" denotes album that did not chart or was not released

=== Live albums ===
List of albums, with selected chart positions, and certifications
Title	Album details	Peak chart positions										Certifications
Title	Album details	US	AUS	CAN	GER	IRE	NLD	NZ	NOR	SWE	UK	Certifications
Live/1975–85	Released: November 10, 1986; Label: Columbia; Format: 5 LP, 3 cassettes, 3 CD, 3 8-tracks	1	3	1	8	42	1	11	3	2	4	US: Diamond (13× Platinum); AUS: Platinum; GER: Gold; NLD: Platinum; NZ: Gold; SWE: Gold; UK: Gold
In Concert/MTV Plugged	Released: April 12, 1993; Label: Columbia; Format: 2 LP, cassette, CD, MD	189	—	—	19	5	4	—	3	14	4	AUS: Platinum; UK: Gold
Live in New York City	Released: April 3, 2001; Label: Columbia; Format: 2 CD, 2 SACD, 2 LP, cassette	5	30	19	9	22	31	—	3	3	12	US: Platinum; UK: Silver
Hammersmith Odeon, London '75	Released: February 28, 2006; Label: Columbia; Format: 2 CD	93	—	71	74	24	50	—	9	42	33	
Live in Dublin	Released: June 5, 2007; Label: Columbia; Format: 2 CD, 3 LP	23	40	31	11	1	4	11	2	2	21	US: Gold; IRE: Platinum
Springsteen on Broadway	Released: December 14, 2018; Label: Columbia; Format: 2 LP, 2 CD, download	11	4	36	7	4	2	12	8	4	6	UK: Silver
The Legendary 1979 No Nukes Concerts	Released: November 19, 2021; Label: Columbia; Format: 2 LP, 2 CD + DVD, 2 CD + Blu-ray, download	33	6	38	7	10	4	33	10	5	11	
Road Diary	Released: October 25, 2024; Label: Columbia; Format: download	—	—	—	—	—	—	—	—	—	—	
Nebraska '82:Expanded Edition:Count Basie Theatre, Red Bank, NJ - 2025	Released: October 24, 2025; Label: Columbia; Format: CD + Blu-ray	—	—	—	—	—	—	—	—	—	—	
"—" denotes album that did not chart or was not released.

==== Live archive releases ====
List of albums, with details
Title	LP details
Apollo Theater 3/09/12	Released: November 17, 2014; Label: live.brucespringsteen.net; Format: download, CD
The Agora, Cleveland 1978	Released: December 23, 2014; Label: live.brucespringsteen.net; Format: download, CD
Tower Theater, Philadelphia 1975	Released: February 10, 2015; Label: live.brucespringsteen.net; Format: download, CD
Nassau Coliseum, New York 1980	Released: March 25, 2015; Label: live.brucespringsteen.net; Format: download, CD
Brendan Byrne Arena, New Jersey 1984	Released: May 13, 2015; Label: live.brucespringsteen.net; Format: download, CD
LA Sports Arena, California 1988	Released: July 8, 2015; Label: live.brucespringsteen.net; Format: download, CD
Schottenstein Center, Ohio 2005	Released: September 25, 2015; Label: live.brucespringsteen.net; Format: download, CD
Ippodromo delle Capannelle, Rome 2013	Released: November 11, 2015; Label: live.brucespringsteen.net; Format: download, CD
Arizona State University, Tempe 1980	Released: December 24, 2015; Label: live.brucespringsteen.net; Format: download, CD
Brooklyn, April 23, 2016	Released: April 25, 2016; Label: live.brucespringsteen.net; Format: download, CD
The Christic Shows 1990	Released: June 1, 2016; Label: live.brucespringsteen.net; Format: download, CD
London, England, June 5, 2016	Released: July 31, 2016; Label: live.brucespringsteen.net; Format: download, CD
HSBC Arena, Buffalo, NY, 11/22/09	Released: December 24, 2016; Label: live.brucespringsteen.net; Format: download, CD
Scottrade Center, St. Louis, MO, 8/23/08	Released: April 17, 2017; Label: live.brucespringsteen.net; Format: download, CD
Olympiastadion, Helsinki, July 31, 2012	Released: May 23, 2017; Label: live.brucespringsteen.net; Format: download, CD
Wachovia Spectrum, Philadelphia, PA 10/20/09	Released: July 14, 2017; Label: live.brucespringsteen.net; Format: download, CD
Palace Theatre, Albany 1977	Released: August 4, 2017; Label: live.brucespringsteen.net; Format: download, CD
Auditorium Theatre, Rochester, NY 1977	Released: August 4, 2017; Label: live.brucespringsteen.net; Format: download, CD
King's Hall, Belfast March 19, 1996	Released: September 8, 2017; Label: live.brucespringsteen.net; Format: download, CD
The Summit, Houston, TX December 8, 1978	Released: September 20, 2017; Label: live.brucespringsteen.net; Format: download, CD
Madison Square Garden, New York July 1, 2000	Released: October 3, 2017; Label: live.brucespringsteen.net; Format: download, CD
Stockholms Stadion, Sweden 1988	Released: November 3, 2017; Label: live.brucespringsteen.net; Format: download, CD
Fair Grounds Race Course, New Orleans April 30, 2006	Released: December 1, 2017; Label: live.brucespringsteen.net; Format: download, CD
Capitol Theatre, Passaic, NJ September 20, 1978	Released: December 22, 2017; Label: live.brucespringsteen.net; Format: download, CD
Brendan Byrne Arena, New Jersey June 24, 1993	Released: January 5, 2018; Label: live.brucespringsteen.net; Format: download, CD
Van Andel Arena, Michigan 2005	Released: February 2, 2018; Label: live.brucespringsteen.net; Format: download, CD
Brendan Byrne Arena, NJ August 20, 1984	Released: March 2, 2018; Label: live.brucespringsteen.net; Format: download, CD
TD Banknorth Garden, Boston 11/19/07	Released: April 6, 2018; Label: live.brucespringsteen.net; Format: download, CD
Freehold, NJ 1996 Saint Rose of Lima School Gym	Released: May 4, 2018; Label: live.brucespringsteen.net; Format: download, CD
MSG November 8, 2009	Released: June 1, 2018; Label: live.brucespringsteen.net; Format: download, CD
The Roxy July 7, 1978	Released: July 6, 2018; Label: live.brucespringsteen.net; Format: download, CD
Wembley Arena June 5, 1981	Released: August 3, 2018; Label: live.brucespringsteen.net; Format: download, CD
Chicago September 30, 1999	Released: September 7, 2018; Label: live.brucespringsteen.net; Format: download, CD
Helsinki June 16, 2003	Released: October 5, 2018; Label: live.brucespringsteen.net; Format: download, CD
Leeds July 24, 2013	Released: November 9, 2018; Label: live.brucespringsteen.net; Format: download, CD
The Live Series: Songs of the Road	Released: November 28, 2018; Label: live.brucespringsteen.net; Format: download
The Roxy 1975	Released: December 7, 2018; Label: live.brucespringsteen.net; Format: download, CD
No Nukes 1979	Released: December 24, 2018; Label: live.brucespringsteen.net; Format: download, CD
Madison Square Garden 1988	Released: January 11, 2019; Label: live.brucespringsteen.net; Format: download, CD
The Live Series: Songs of Friendship	Released: January 25, 2019; Label: live.brucespringsteen.net; Format: download
St. Pete Times Forum, Tampa, Fl, April 22, 2008	Released: February 1, 2019; Label: live.brucespringsteen.net; Format: download, CD
Sovereign Bank Arena, Trenton, NJ 2005	Released: March 1, 2019; Label: live.brucespringsteen.net; Format: download, CD
The Live Series: Songs of Hope	Released: March 29, 2019; Label: live.brucespringsteen.net; Format: download
Los Angeles Memorial Coliseum September 27, 1985	Released: April 5, 2019; Label: live.brucespringsteen.net; Format: download, CD
Meadowlands July 25, 1992	Released: May 3, 2019; Label: live.brucespringsteen.net; Format: download, CD
East Rutherford, NJ 09.22.12	Released: June 7, 2019; Label: live.brucespringsteen.net; Format: download, CD
Nassau Coliseum, New York 12/29/80	Released: July 5, 2019; Label: live.brucespringsteen.net; Format: download, CD
Nassau Coliseum, New York December 31, 1980, Remix	Released: July 5, 2019; Label: live.brucespringsteen.net; Format: download, CD
Bridge School, October 19, 1986	Released: August 9, 2019; Label: live.brucespringsteen.net; Format: download, CD
The Live Series: Songs of Love	Released: August 23, 2019; Label: live.brucespringsteen.net; Format: download
Passaic, September 19, 1978	Released: September 9, 2019; Label: live.brucespringsteen.net; Format: download, CD
Los Angeles, October 23, 1999	Released: October 11, 2019; Label: live.brucespringsteen.net; Format: download, CD
The Live Series: Songs from Around the World	Released: October 24, 2019; Label: live.brucespringsteen.net; Format: download
Asbury Park 11/24/96	Released: November 1, 2019; Label: live.brucespringsteen.net; Format: download, CD
Winterland December 15, 1978	Released: December 20, 2019; Label: live.brucespringsteen.net; Format: download, CD
Winterland December 16, 1978	Released: December 20, 2019; Label: live.brucespringsteen.net; Format: download, CD
Nassau Coliseum 05.04.09	Released: February 7, 2020; Label: live.brucespringsteen.net; Format: download, CD
The Live Series: Songs Under Cover	Released: February 14, 2020; Label: live.brucespringsteen.net; Format: download
Joe Louis Arena, Detroit 1988	Released: March 6, 2020; Label: live.brucespringsteen.net; Format: download, CD
Gothenburg July 28, 2012	Released: April 3, 2020; Label: live.brucespringsteen.net; Format: download, CD
Brendan Byrne Arena 1981	Released: May 1, 2020; Label: live.brucespringsteen.net; Format: download, CD
The Live Series: Songs of Summer	Released: May 15, 2020; Label: live.brucespringsteen.net; Format: download
Stockholm 2005	Released: June 12, 2020; Label: live.brucespringsteen.net; Format: download, CD
First Union Center, Philadelphia September 25, 1999	Released: July 3, 2020; Label: live.brucespringsteen.net; Format: download, CD
The Live Series: Stripped Down	Released: July 17, 2020; Label: live.brucespringsteen.net; Format: download
Wembley Arena, November 11, 2006	Released: August 21, 2020; Label: live.brucespringsteen.net; Format: download, CD
Brendan Byrne August 6, 1984	Released: September 18, 2020; Label: live.brucespringsteen.net; Format: download, CD
Atlanta September 30, 1978	Released: October 8, 2020; Label: live.brucespringsteen.net; Format: download, CD
Greensboro, North Carolina April 28, 2008	Released: November 6, 2020; Label: live.brucespringsteen.net; Format: download, CD
London 11/24/75	Released: December 4, 2020; Label: live.brucespringsteen.net; Format: download, CD
MSG 11.07.09	Released: December 24, 2020; Label: live.brucespringsteen.net; Format: download, CD
St. Paul, MN Nov 12, 2012	Released: January 8, 2021; Label: live.brucespringsteen.net; Format: download, CD
Nice, France 1997	Released: February 5, 2021; Label: live.brucespringsteen.net; Format: download, CD
The Live Series: Songs Under Cover Vol.2	Released: March 5, 2021; Label: live.brucespringsteen.net; Format: download
MSG June 27, 2000	Released: March 12, 2021; Label: live.brucespringsteen.net; Format: download, CD
Los Angeles, April 1988	Released: April 2, 2021; Label: live.brucespringsteen.net; Format: download, CD
Boston 12/13/92	Released: May 7, 2021; Label: live.brucespringsteen.net; Format: download, CD
Berkeley, July 1, 1978	Released: June 18, 2021; Label: live.brucespringsteen.net; Format: download, CD
Giants Stadium, NJ August 22, 1985	Released: July 23, 2021; Label: live.brucespringsteen.net; Format: download, CD
Boston, MA August 15, 2012	Released: August 6, 2021; Label: live.brucespringsteen.net; Format: download, CD
Tower Theater 2005	Released: September 5, 2021; Label: live.brucespringsteen.net; Format: download, CD
Conseco Fieldhouse, Indianapolis, March 20, 2008	Released: October 21, 2021; Label: live.brucespringsteen.net; Format: download, CD
Nassau Coliseum December 28, 1980	Released: December 3, 2021; Label: live.brucespringsteen.net; Format: download, CD
Greenvale, NY 1975	Released: December 24, 2021; Label: live.brucespringsteen.net; Format: download, CD
Arrowhead Pond of Anaheim, CA 05/22/00	Released: January 7, 2022; Label: live.brucespringsteen.net; Format: download, CD
Tower Theater 1995	Released: February 4, 2022; Label: live.brucespringsteen.net; Format: download, CD
Cleveland 11.10.09	Released: March 4, 2022; Label: live.brucespringsteen.net; Format: download, CD
Waldbühne, Berlin Germany May 14, 1993	Released: April 1, 2022; Label: live.brucespringsteen.net; Format: download, CD
The Live Series: Songs of Location	Released: April 29, 2022; Label: live.brucespringsteen.net; Format: download
MSG 05/16/88	Released: May 6, 2022; Label: live.brucespringsteen.net; Format: download, CD
London June 4, 1981	Released: June 3, 2022; Label: live.brucespringsteen.net; Format: download, CD
July 4, 2012 Paris	Released: July 1, 2022; Label: live.brucespringsteen.net; Format: download, CD
July 5, 2012 Paris	Released: July 1, 2022; Label: live.brucespringsteen.net; Format: download, CD
Brendan Byrne 8/19/84	Released: August 5, 2022; Label: live.brucespringsteen.net; Format: download, CD
Rome, Italy October 10, 2006	Released: September 2, 2022; Label: live.brucespringsteen.net; Format: download, CD
Atlanta, Oct 1, 1978	Released: October 7, 2022; Label: live.brucespringsteen.net; Format: download, CD
Asbury Park 11/26/96	Released: November 4, 2022; Label: live.brucespringsteen.net; Format: download, CD
Nashville Aug 21, 2008	Released: December 2, 2022; Label: live.brucespringsteen.net; Format: download, CD
East Rutherford, NJ – July 18, 1999	Released: December 24, 2022; Label: live.brucespringsteen.net; Format: download, CD
The Live Series: Songs of Character	Released: April 21, 2023; Label: live.brucespringsteen.net; Format: download
The Live Series: Songs of Introspection	Released: July 28, 2023; Label: live.brucespringsteen.net; Format: download
The Live Series: Songs of New Jersey	Released: September 22, 2023; Label: live.brucespringsteen.net; Format: download
The Live Series: Songs on Keys	Released: November 24, 2023; Label: live.brucespringsteen.net; Format: download
Philadelphia 10.14.09	Released: December 9, 2023; Label: live.brucespringsteen.net; Format: download, CD
Continental Airlines Arena, East Rutherford, NJ – July 15, 1999	Released: December 22, 2023; Label: live.brucespringsteen.net; Format: download, CD
July 23, 2013 Cardiff	Released: January 12, 2024; Label: live.brucespringsteen.net; Format: download, CD
Akron, Ohio 1996	Released: February 2, 2024; Label: live.brucespringsteen.net; Format: download, CD
Passaic September 21, 1978	Released: March 8, 2024; Label: live.brucespringsteen.net; Format: download, CD
The Live Series: Songs of Celebration	Released: March 15, 2024; Label: live.brucespringsteen.net; Format: download
The Live Series: Songs from Around the World Vol. 2	Released: May 17, 2024; Label: live.brucespringsteen.net; Format: download
The Born in the U.S.A. Tour '84–'85	Released: June 4, 2024; Label: live.brucespringsteen.net; Format: download
The Reunion Tour '99	Released: July 26, 2024; Label: live.brucespringsteen.net; Format: download
The Live Series: Songs of Conscience	Released: September 20, 2024; Label: live.brucespringsteen.net; Format: download
The Live Series: Songs Under Cover Vol.3	Released: December 20, 2024; Label: live.brucespringsteen.net; Format: download
Toronto 1975	Released: December 20, 2024; Label: live.brucespringsteen.net; Format: download, CD
Vancouver 2005	Released: February 6, 2025; Label: live.brucespringsteen.net; Format: download, CD
Omaha NE Nov 15, 2012	Released: March 7, 2025; Label: live.brucespringsteen.net; Format: download, CD
Amway Arena, Orlando, FL, April 23, 2008	Released: April 11, 2025; Label: live.brucespringsteen.net; Format: download, CD
Oakland Arena, Oakland, CA, October 28, 1999	Released: May 10, 2025; Label: live.brucespringsteen.net; Format: download, CD
Brendan Byrne Arena 1981	Released: October 3, 2025; Label: live.brucespringsteen.net; Format: download, CD
Oracle Arena, Oakland, CA-October 26, 2007	Released: November 7, 2025; Label: live.brucespringsteen.net; Format: download, CD
Turku, FI 2013	Released: December 5, 2025; Label: live.brucespringsteen.net; Format: download, CD
Sydney 1997	Released: February 6, 2026; Label: live.brucespringsteen.net; Format: download, CD
Madison Square Garden, New York 06/22/2000	Released: March 6, 2026; Label: live.brucespringsteen.net; Format: download, CD
Buffalo, NY 2005	Rleased: August 7, 2026; Label: live.brucespringsteen.net; Format: download, CD
Stockholm, July 2, 1988	Rleased: September 4, 2026; Label: live.brucespringsteen.net; Format: download, CD
Barcelona Oct 16, 2002	Rleased: October 3, 2026; Label: live.brucespringsteen.net; Format: download, CD

=== Soundtrack albums ===
List of albums, with selected chart positions, and certifications
Title	Album details	Charts		
Title	Album details	US	AUS	UK
Blinded by the Light: Original Motion Picture Soundtrack	Released: July 8, 2019; Label: Columbia Records/Legacy Recordings; Format: CD, LP, download	—	—	—
Western Stars – Songs from the Film	Released: October 25, 2019; Label: Columbia; Format: CD, LP, download	141	45	11
"—" denotes album that did not chart or was not released

=== Compilation albums ===
List of albums, with selected chart positions, and certifications
Title	Album details	Peak chart positions										Certifications
Title	Album details	US	AUS	CAN	GER	IRE	NLD	NZ	NOR	SWE	UK	Certifications
Greatest Hits	Released: February 27, 1995; Label: Columbia; Format: CD, cassette, LP	1	1	1	1	1	2	1	1	1	1	US: 6× Platinum; AUS: 10× Platinum; CAN: 4× Platinum; GER: 2× Platinum; NLD: 2× Platinum; NZ: 3× Platinum; NOR: 2× Platinum; UK: 5× Platinum
Tracks	Released: November 10, 1998; Label: Columbia; Format: 4CD (box set), 4 cassettes	27	97	—	63	—	36	—	4	11	50	US: Platinum; CAN: Gold; UK: Silver
18 Tracks	Released: April 13, 1999; Label: Columbia; Format: CD, 2LP, cassette	64	98	58	8	20	69	—	2	1	23	UK: Silver; SWE: Gold
The Essential Bruce Springsteen	Released: November 11, 2003/August 26, 2008/October 23, 2015 (new version); Label: Columbia; Format: 3CD, 3 cassettes	14	41	—	—	5	22	—	4	2	15	US: 2× Platinum; AUS: 2× Platinum; NOR: Platinum; SWE: Gold
Greatest Hits	Released: January 13, 2009 (American edition) June 1, 2009 (European limited tour edition); Label: Columbia; Format: CD	43	17	21	25	2	4	3	3	1	3	IRE: Platinum; SWE: Platinum
The Promise	Released: November 16, 2010; Label: Columbia; Format: 2CD, 3LP	16	22	27	1	4	4	30	1	1	7	US: Gold; GER: Gold; IRE: Platinum
Collection: 1973–2012	Released: March 8, 2013 (Australian limited tour edition) April 15, 2013 (European edition); Label: Columbia; Format: CD	—	6	—	23	2	78	19	1	6	—	
Chapter and Verse	Released: September 23, 2016; Label: Columbia; Format: CD, vinyl	5	2	21	4	2	5	4	3	2	2	AUS: Gold; UK: Silver
Best of Bruce Springsteen	Released: April 19, 2024; Label: Columbia; Format: Digital download, streaming	121	32	—	6	3	12	20	—	23	15	UK: Silver
Lost and Found: Selections from The Lost Albums	Released: June 27, 2025; Label: Columbia; Format: CD, 2LP, download	—	—	—	5	—	9	—	57	—	—	
"—" denotes album that did not chart or was not released

== Box sets ==
List of albums, with selected chart positions, and certifications
Title	Album details	Peak chart positions							Certifications
Title	Album details	US	GER	IRE	NLD	NOR	SWE	UK	Certifications
The Born in the U.S.A. 12" Single Collection	Released: 1985 (UK only); Label: CBS; Format: 12" maxi single, 45 RPM	—	—	—	—	—	—	—	
The Collection	Released: November 15, 2004; Label: Columbia; Format: 3CD	—	—	85	—	—	—	157	
Born to Run: 30th Anniversary Edition	Released: November 15, 2005; Label: Columbia; Format: CD+2DVD	18	—	40	—	13	7	63	IRE: Gold
The Collection 1973–1984	Released: August 13, 2010; Label: Columbia; Format: 8CD	—	15	19	47	13	59	35	
The Promise: The Darkness on the Edge of Town Story	Released: November 16, 2010; Label: Columbia; Format: 3CD+3DVD	27	—	—	—	—	—	—	
The Album Collection Vol. 1 1973–1984	Released: November 17, 2014; Label: Sony Legacy; Format: 8CD, 8LP, download	82	34	95	78	38	32	128	
The Ties That Bind: The River Collection	Released: December 4, 2015; Label: Columbia; Format: 4CD+3DVD, 4CD+2Blu-ray	31	12	24	14	8	5	49	UK: Silver
The Album Collection Vol. 2 1987–1996	Released: May 18, 2018; Label: Sony Legacy; Format: 7CD, 10LP, download	—	—	—	—	—	—	—	
Tracks II: The Lost Albums	Released: June 27, 2025; Label: Columbia; Format: 7CD, 9LP, download	67	1	8	1	5	1	2	
Nebraska ’82: Expanded Edition	Released: October 24, 2025; Label: Columbia/Sony Music; Format: 4CD+Blu-ray, 4LP+Blu-ray, download	—	—	—	—	—	—	14	
"—" denotes album that did not chart or was not released.

== Extended plays ==
List of albums, with selected chart positions, and certifications
Title	EP details	Charts			Certifications
Title	EP details	US	AUS	UK	Certifications
Live Collection	Released: 1987; Label: Sony; Format: CD, LP, cassette	—	—	—	
Live Collection II	Released: 1987; Label: Sony; Format: CD, LP, cassette	—	—	—	
Chimes of Freedom	Released: August 1, 1988; Label: Columbia; Format: CD, LP, cassette	—	142	—	CAN: Gold
Blood Brothers	Released: March 3, 1996; Label: Columbia; Format: CD, cassette	—	—	—	
PBS Exclusive	Released: April 25, 2007; Label: Columbia; Format: CD	—	—	—	
Magic Tour Highlights	Released: July 15, 2008; Label: Columbia; Format: download	48	—	—	
Live from the Carousel	Released: April 16, 2011; Label: Columbia; Format: 10-inch vinyl, 45-rpm (limited edition)	—	—	—	
American Beauty	Released: April 19, 2014; Label: Columbia; Format: 12-inch vinyl (limited edition Record Store Day exclusive), download	31	—	124	
Land of Hope & Dreams	Released: May 21, 2025; Label: Format: streaming, digital download	—	—	—	
"—" denotes album that did not chart or was not released

== Singles ==
Title	Year	Peak chart positions										Certifications	Album
Title	Year	US	AUS	CAN	GER	IRE	NL	NZ	NOR	SWE	UK	Certifications	Album
"Blinded by the Light"	1973	—	—	—	—	—	—	—	—	—	—		Greetings from Asbury Park, N.J.
"Spirit in the Night"	1973	—	—	—	—	—	—	—	—	—	—		Greetings from Asbury Park, N.J.
"4th of July, Asbury Park (Sandy)"	1975	—	—	—	—	—	—	—	—	—	—		The Wild, the Innocent & the E Street Shuffle
"Born to Run"	1975	23	38	53	—	81	—	—	—	17	56 (Note: "Born to Run" UK chart position is from the official UK "Breakers List".)	US: 2× Platinum; AUS: 2× Platinum; NZ: 2× Platinum; UK: Platinum	Born to Run
"Tenth Avenue Freeze-Out"	1975	83	—	82	—	—	—	—	—	—	—		Born to Run
"Blinded by the Light" (European re-release)	1977	—	—	—	—	—	—	—	—	—	—		Greetings from Asbury Park, N.J.
"Prove It All Night"	1978	33	90	57	—	—	—	—	—	—	—		Darkness on the Edge of Town
"Badlands"	1978	42	—	44	—	—	—	—	—	—	—		Darkness on the Edge of Town
"The Promised Land"	1978	—	—	—	—	—	—	—	—	—	—		Darkness on the Edge of Town
"Rosalita (Come Out Tonight)"	1979	—	—	—	—	—	—	—	—	—	—	US: Gold	The Wild, the Innocent & the E Street Shuffle
"Hungry Heart"	1980	5	33	5	—	84	—	24	—	17	44	US: Gold; AUS: Platinum; NZ: Platinum; UK: Silver	The River
"Fade Away"	1981	20	—	19	—	—	—	—	—	—	—		The River
"I Wanna Marry You"	1981	—	—	—	—	—	—	—	—	—	—		The River
"Sherry Darling"	1981	—	—	—	—	—	—	—	—	—	—		The River
"The River"	1981	—	—	—	—	24	25	—	5	10 (Note: "The River" Swedish chart position from July 2008, when it entered the charts with download sales.)	35	US: Gold; AUS: Platinum; NZ: Platinum; UK: Silver	The River
"Cadillac Ranch"	1981	—	—	—	—	—	—	—	—	—	—		The River
"Point Blank"	1981	—	—	—	—	—	—	—	—	—	—		The River
"Atlantic City"	1982	—	—	49	—	—	—	—	—	—	—		Nebraska
"Open All Night"	1982	— (Note: In November 2003, "Open All Night"'s B-side, "The Big Payback", made it to number 13 on Billboard's Digital Tracks chart.)	—	—	—	—	—	—	—	—	—		Nebraska
"Dancing in the Dark"	1984	2	5	3	—	2	1	4	7	2	4	US: 4× Platinum; AUS: 9× Platinum; CAN: Platinum; GER: Gold; NZ: 7× Platinum; UK: 3× Platinum	Born in the U.S.A.
"Cover Me"	1984	7	17	12	—	6	30	7	—	15	16	US: Gold; AUS: Gold	Born in the U.S.A.
"Born in the U.S.A."	1984	9	2	11	16	1	5	1	20 (Note: "Born in the U.S.A." Norwegian chart position from July 2008, when it entered the charts with download sales.)	11	5	US: 3× Platinum; AUS: 3× Platinum; GER: Gold; NZ: 2× Platinum; UK: Platinum	Born in the U.S.A.
"I'm on Fire"	1985	6	12	12	16	1	10	1	20	20	5	US: 2× Platinum; GER: Gold; NZ: 5× Platinum; UK: 2× Platinum	Born in the U.S.A.
"Glory Days"	1985	5	29	17	27	3	16	34	—	20	17	US: Platinum; AUS: 2× Platinum; NZ: 2× Platinum; UK: Silver	Born in the U.S.A.
"I'm Goin' Down"	1985	9	41	23	61	—	—	—	—	13	—		Born in the U.S.A.
"My Hometown/Santa Claus Is Comin' to Town"	1985	6	47	16	—	6	24	28	—	20	9	US: Platinum; AUS: Gold; CAN: Gold; NZ: Gold; UK: Gold	Born in the U.S.A.
"War" (Bruce Springsteen & The E Street Band)	1986	8	38	11	27	2	8	42	2	4	18		Live/1975–85
"Fire" (Bruce Springsteen & The E Street Band)	1987	46	82	42	—	18	22	—	—	17	54	AUS: 5× Platinum	Live/1975–85
"Born to Run" (live) (Bruce Springsteen & The E Street Band)	1987	—	—	—	—	9	91	—	—	—	16		Live/1975–85
"Brilliant Disguise"	1987	5	17	9	38	2	15	26	1	3	20	AUS: Gold	Tunnel of Love
"Tunnel of Love"	1987	9	41	17	—	22	39	48	—	—	45		Tunnel of Love
"One Step Up"	1988	13	67	23	—	—	44	—	—	—	—		Tunnel of Love
"Tougher Than the Rest"	1988	—	35	—	25	10	17	—	—	—	13	AUS: Gold	Tunnel of Love
"Spare Parts"	1988	—	58	—	—	12	78	—	—	16	32		Tunnel of Love
"Human Touch"	1992	16	17	2	15	4	3	12	1	4	11	AUS: Gold	Human Touch
"Better Days"	1992	16	75	36	—	25	29	—	—	23	34		Lucky Town
"57 Channels (And Nothin' On)"	1992	68	107	25	—	26	39	—	9	32	32		Human Touch
"Leap of Faith"	1992	—	133	48	—	—	38	—	—	23	46		Lucky Town
"Lucky Town"	1992	—	—	—	—	—	—	—	—	—	—		Lucky Town
"If I Should Fall Behind"	1992	—	196	—	—	—	—	—	—	—	—		Lucky Town
"Lucky Town" (live)	1993	—	—	—	—	—	—	—	—	—	48		In Concert/MTV Plugged
"Streets of Philadelphia"	1994	9	4	1	1	1	5	3	1	3	2	US: Platinum; AUS: 3× Platinum; GER: Gold; NZ: 5× Platinum; UK: Platinum	Philadelphia (soundtrack)
"Murder Incorporated"	1995	—	—	5	—	—	—	—	—	—	—		Greatest Hits
"Secret Garden"	1995	63	92	7	66	—	33	—	—	—	44	US: Gold; NZ: Gold; UK: Gold	Greatest Hits
"Hungry Heart '95"	1995	—	—	—	62	—	46	—	—	—	28		Greatest Hits
"The Ghost of Tom Joad"	1995	—	—	34	—	—	—	—	—	—	26		The Ghost of Tom Joad
"Dead Man Walkin'"	1996	—	—	—	—	—	—	—	—	33	—		Dead Man Walking (soundtrack)
"Missing"	1996	—	—	—	83	—	—	—	15	22	—		The Crossing Guard (soundtrack)
"Secret Garden" (re-release)	1997	19	9	—	—	14	29	—	—	—	17	AUS: Platinum	Jerry Maguire (soundtrack)
"I Wanna Be With You"	1998	—	—	41	—	—	—	—	—	—	—		Tracks
"Sad Eyes"	1999	—	—	—	—	—	—	—	—	54	—		Tracks
"The Rising"	2002	52	—	8	49	—	39	—	5	10	94		The Rising
"Lonesome Day"	2002	—	—	—	92	39	51	—	—	47	39		The Rising
"Waitin' on a Sunny Day"	2003	—	51	—	85	46	46	—	—	15	—		The Rising
"Devils & Dust"	2005	72	—	—	—	—	—	—	—	—	—		Devils & Dust
"All the Way Home"	2005	—	—	—	—	—	—	—	—	—	—		Devils & Dust
"Radio Nowhere"	2007	— (Note: "Radio Nowhere" did not enter the Billboard Hot 100, but peaked at number two on the Bubbling Under Hot 100 Singles chart.)	—	55	90	24	—	—	2	60	96	US: Gold	Magic
"Santa Claus Is Comin' to Town" (re-release)	2007	— (Note: "Santa Claus Is Comin' to Town" did not enter the Billboard Hot 100, but peaked at number 31 on the Digital Song Sales chart.)	39	—	80	42	—	—	—	12	41	AUS: Gold; NZ: Gold; UK: Gold	non-album single
"Girls in Their Summer Clothes"	2008	95	—	—	—	—	—	—	—	—	—		Magic
"Dream Baby Dream"	2008	—	—	—	—	80	—	—	—	24	—		Alan Vega 70th Birthday Limited Edition EP Series
"Working on a Dream"	2008	95	—	91	—	—	65	—	9	37	133		Working on a Dream
"My Lucky Day"	2008	—	—	—	—	—	—	—	—	—	—		Working on a Dream
"The Wrestler"	2008	— (Note: "The Wrestler" did not enter the Billboard Hot 100, but peaked at number 20 on the Bubbling Under Hot 100 Singles chart.)	158	—	63	40	56	—	14	19	93		Working on a Dream
"What Love Can Do"	2009	—	—	—	—	—	—	—	—	—	—		Working on a Dream
"Wrecking Ball" (live) (Bruce Springsteen & The E Street Band)	2009	— (Note: "Wrecking Ball" did not enter the Billboard Hot 100, but peaked at number three on the Hot Singles Sales chart.)	—	—	—	—	—	—	—	36	—		London Calling – Live in Hyde Park
"Save My Love"	2010	— (Note: "Save My Love" did not enter the Billboard Hot 100, but peaked at number seven on the Hot Singles Sales chart.)	—	—	—	—	—	—	—	—	—		The Promise
"We Take Care of Our Own"	2012	— (Note: "We Take Care of Our Own" did not enter the Billboard Hot 100, but peaked at number six on the Bubbling Under Hot 100 Singles chart.)	—	—	—	41	73	—	—	—	111		Wrecking Ball
"Death to My Hometown"	2012	—	—	—	—	—	—	—	—	—	—		Wrecking Ball
"High Hopes"	2013	—	—	—	—	65	—	—	—	—	167		High Hopes
"Just Like Fire Would"	2014	—	—	—	—	—	—	—	—	—	—		High Hopes
"American Beauty"	2014	—	175	—	—	38	—	—	—	—	83		American Beauty
"Hello Sunshine"	2019	— (Note: "Hello Sunshine" did not enter the Billboard Hot 100, but peaked at number 41 on the Digital Song Sales chart.)	—	—	—	—	— (Note: "Hello Sunshine" did not enter the Netherlands' Single Top 100 but peaked on the Netherlands' Airplay Chart at number 40.)	—	—	— (Note: "Hello Sunshine" did not enter the Swedish Singellista Chart, but peaked at number 16 on the Swedish Heatseeker Chart.)	—		Western Stars
"Tucson Train"	2019	—	—	—	—	—	—	—	—	— (Note: "Tucson Train" did not enter the Swedish Singellista Chart, but peaked at number 20 on the Swedish Heatseeker Chart.)	—		Western Stars
"Letter to You"	2020	—	—	— (Note: "Letter to You" did not enter the Canadian Hot 100, but peaked at number 42 on the Canadian Digital Song Sales chart.)	—	52	— (Note: "Letter to You" did not enter the Netherlands' Single Top 100 but peaked on the Netherlands' Single Tip Chart at number 30.)	— (Note: "Letter to You" did not enter the NZ Top 40 Singles Chart, but peaked at number 38 on the NZ Hot Singles Chart.)	—	98	— (Note: "Letter to You" did not enter the UK Singles Chart, but peaked at number 45 on the UK Singles Downloads Chart.)		Letter to You
"Ghosts"	2020	—	—	—	—	—	—	—	—	—	— (Note: "Ghosts" did not enter the UK Singles Chart, but peaked at number 32 on the UK Singles Downloads Chart.)		Letter to You
"Do I Love You (Indeed I Do)"	2022	—	—	—	— (Note: "Do I Love You (Indeed I Do)" did not enter the German Singles Chart, but peaked at number 82 on the Deutsche Download Singles Chart.)	—	—	—	—	—	— (Note: "Do I Love You (Indeed I Do)" did not enter the UK Singles Chart, but peaked at number 20 on the UK Singles Sales Chart.)		Only the Strong Survive
"Nightshift"	2022	—	— (Note: "Nightshift" did not enter the Australian ARIA Singles Chart but peaked at number 30 on the ARIA Digital Track Chart.)	—	— (Note: "Nightshift" did not enter the German Singles Chart, but peaked at number 26 on the Deutsche Download Singles Chart.)	—	—	—	—	—	— (Note: "Nightshift" did not enter the UK Singles Chart, but peaked at number 52 on the UK Singles Sales Chart.)		Only the Strong Survive
"Don't Play That Song"	2022	—	—	—	— (Note: "Don't Play That Song" did not enter the German Singles Chart, but peaked at number 69 on the Deutsche Download Singles Chart.)	—	—	—	—	—	—		Only the Strong Survive
"Turn Back the Hands of Time"	2022	—	—	—	—	—	—	—	—	—	—		Only the Strong Survive
"Streets of Minneapolis"	2026	— (Note: "Streets of Minneapolis" did not enter the Billboard Hot 100, but peaked at number 6 on the Bubbling Under Hot 100 chart.)	—	—	—	86	— (Note: "Streets of Minneapolis" did not enter the Dutch Single Top 100, but peaked at number 12 on the Single Tip chart.)	— (Note: "Streets of Minneapolis" did not enter the NZ Top 40 Singles Chart, but peaked at number 14 on the NZ Hot Singles Chart.)	41	35	92		Non-album single
"—" denotes a title that did not chart, or was not released in that territory.

=== Promotional singles / Other charted and certified songs ===
Title	Year	Peak chart positions							Certifications	Album
Title	Year	US	US Rock	IRE	NZ	NOR	SWE	UK	Certifications	Album
"Thunder Road"	1975	—	—	—	—	—	—	—	US: Platinum; AUS: Gold; NZ: Gold; UK: Silver	Born to Run
"Be True"	1981	—	42	—	—	—	—	—		Fade Away (single)
"Ramrod"	1981	—	30	—	—	—	—	—		The River
"I'm a Rocker"	1981	—	42	—	—	—	—	—		The River
"Santa Claus Is Comin' to Town"	1981	—	—	—	—	—	—	—		In Harmony 2
"Johnny 99"	1982	—	50	—	—	—	—	—		Nebraska
"No Surrender"	1984	—	29	—	—	—	—	—		Born in the U.S.A.
"Bobby Jean"	1984	—	36	—	—	—	—	—		Born in the U.S.A.
"Pink Cadillac"	1984	—	27	—	—	—	—	—		"Dancing in the Dark" (single)
"Jersey Girl"	1984	—	—	92	—	—	—	—		"Cover Me" (single)
"Trapped" (Bruce Springsteen & The E Street Band)	1985	—	1	—	—	—	—	—		USA for Africa: We Are the World
"Stand on It"	1985	—	32	—	—	—	—	—		"Glory Days" (single)
"Because the Night" (Bruce Springsteen & The E Street Band)	1986	—	22	—	—	—	—	—		Live/1975–85
"All That Heaven Will Allow"	1988	—	5	—	—	—	—	—		Tunnel of Love
"Chimes of Freedom"	1988	—	16	—	—	—	—	—		Chimes of Freedom
"Roll of the Dice"	1992	—	6	—	—	—	—	—		Human Touch
"Pay Me My Money Down"	2006	—	—	—	—	8	—	—		We Shall Overcome: The Seeger Sessions
"Long Walk Home"	2007	—	—	—	—	—	57	—		Magic
"This Little Light of Mine"	2007	—	—	98	—	—	—	—		Live in Dublin
"American Land"	2008	—	—	43	—	—	—	—		We Shall Overcome: The Seeger Sessions
"Life Itself"	2008	—	—	—	—	—	—	—		Working on a Dream
"My City of Ruins"	2011	—	—	—	17	—	—	—		The Rising
"Rocky Ground"	2012	—	—	—	—	—	—	—		Wrecking Ball
"Meet Me in the City"	2015	—	—	—	—	—	—	—		The Ties That Bind: The River Collection
"Party Lights"	2015	—	—	—	—	—	—	—		The Ties That Bind: The River Collection
"Western Stars"	2019	—	—	87	—	—	—	—		Western Stars
"One Minute You're Here"	2020	—	—	69	—	—	— (Note: "One Minute You're Here" did not enter the Swedish Singellista Chart, but peaked at number 7 on the Swedish Heatseeker Chart.)	— (Note: "One Minute You're Here" did not enter the UK Singles Chart, but peaked at number 77 on the UK Singles Downloads Chart.)		Letter to You
"Burnin' Train"	2020	—	—	—	—	—	— (Note: "Burnin' Train" did not enter the Swedish Singellista Chart, but peaked at number 18 on the Swedish Heatseeker Chart.)	—		Letter to You
"The Power of Prayer"	2020	—	—	73	—	—	89	—		Letter to You
"I'll See You in My Dreams"	2021	—	—	—	—	—	— (Note: "I'll See You in My Dreams" did not enter the UK Singles Chart, but peaked at number 94 on the UK Singles Downloads Chart.)			Letter to You
"Sandpaper" (Zach Bryan featuring Bruce Springsteen)	2024	74	—	17	—	—	—	—	US: Gold; CAN: Platinum	The Great American Bar Scene
"Rain in the River"	2025	—	—	—	—	—	—	—		Tracks II: The Lost Albums
"Blind Spot"	2025	—	—	—	—	—	—	—		Tracks II: The Lost Albums
"Faithless"	2025	—	—	—	—	—	—	—		Tracks II: The Lost Albums
"Repo Man"	2025	—	—	—	—	—	—	—		Tracks II: The Lost Albums
"Adelita"	2025	—	—	—	—	—	—	—		Tracks II: The Lost Albums
"Sunday Love"	2025	—	—	—	—	—	—	—		Tracks II: The Lost Albums
"Born in the U.S.A. (Electric Nebraska)"	2025	—	—	—	—	—	—	—		Nebraska '82: Expanded Edition
"—" denotes a title that did not chart, or was not released in that territory.

== Various artists releases ==
Springsteen has also contributed a number of performances to various artists' collections that have not been included on his own albums.

=== Studio ===
Year	Contribution	Album
1988	"I Ain't Got No Home" and "Vigilante Man"	Folkways: A Vision Shared
1990	"Viva Las Vegas"	The Last Temptation of Elvis
1991	"Chicken Lips and Lizard Hips"	For Our Children
1994	"Gypsy Woman"	A Tribute to Curtis Mayfield
1999	"Lift Me Up"	Limbo
2002	"Give My Love to Rose"	Kindred Spirits: A Tribute to the Songs of Johnny Cash
2004	"My Ride's Here"	Enjoy Every Sandwich: The Songs of Warren Zevon
2007	"Once Upon a Time in the West"	We All Love Ennio Morricone
2007	"Hobo's Lullaby" (with Pete Seeger)	Give US Your Poor
2007	"The Ghost of Tom Joad" (with Pete Seeger)	Sowing the Seeds – The 10th Anniversary
2014	"Linda Paloma" (with Patti Scialfa)	Looking Into You: A Tribute to Jackson Browne
2026	"A Rainy Night in Soho"	20th Century Paddy - The Songs of Shane MacGowan

=== Live ===
Year	Contribution	Album
1979	"Stay" (with Jackson Browne and Rosemary Butler); "Devil with the Blue Dress Medley"	No Nukes
1981	"Santa Claus Is Comin' to Town"	In Harmony 2
1985	"Trapped"	We Are the World
1987	"Remember When the Music"	Harry Chapin Tribute
1987	"Merry Christmas Baby"	A Very Special Christmas
1996	"Shake, Rattle and Roll"; "Great Balls of Fire" and "Whole Lotta Shakin' Goin' On" (with Jerry Lee Lewis)	The Concert for the Rock and Roll Hall of Fame
2000	"Riding My Car" and "Deportee (Plane Wreck at Los Gatos)"	Til We Outnumber 'Em
2001	"My City of Ruins"	America: A Tribute to Heroes
2009	"The Rising" (with The Joyce Garrett Singers) "This Land Is Your Land" (with Pete Seeger, Tao Rodríguez-Seeger, and Inaugural Celebration Chorus)	The Official Inaugural Celebration (DVD)
2010	"The Ghost of Tom Joad" (with Tom Morello) "Fortunate Son" (with John Fogerty) "Oh, Pretty Woman" (with John Fogerty) "Jungleland" "A Fine Fine Boy" (with Darlene Love) "New York State of Mind" (with Billy Joel) "Born to Run" (with Billy Joel) "(Your Love Keeps Lifting Me) Higher and Higher" (with Love, Fogerty, Sam Moore, Joel and Morello) "Because the Night" (with U2, Patti Smith and Roy Bittan) "I Still Haven't Found What I'm Looking For" (with U2)	The 25th Anniversary Rock & Roll Hall of Fame Concerts
2010	"We Shall Overcome"	Hope for Haiti Now
2025	"Badlands" (with The Killers) "Dustland" (with The Killers) "Born to Run" (with The Killers and Jake Clemons)	The Killers & Bruce Springsteen: Encore at the Garden

== Guest appearances ==
=== Singles ===
Title	Year	Peak chart positions										Certifications	Album
Title	Year	US	AUS	AUT	CAN	FRA	NLD	NZL	SWE	SWI	UK	Certifications	Album
"We Are the World" (as part of USA for Africa)	1985	1	1	2	1	1	1	1	1	1	1	US: 4× Platinum; UK: Silver; CAN: 3× Platinum; FRA: Platinum	We Are the World
"Chinatown" (Bleachers featuring Bruce Springsteen)	2020	—	—	—	—	—	—	—	—	—	—		Take the Sadness Out of Saturday Night
"Dustland" (The Killers featuring Bruce Springsteen)	2021	— (Note: "Dustland" did not enter the Billboard Hot 100, but peaked at number 47 on the Digital Song Sales chart.)	— (Note: "Dustland" did not enter the Australian ARIA Singles Chart but peaked at number 34 on the ARIA Digital Track Chart.)	—	—	—	—	— (Note: "Dustland" did not enter the NZ Top 40 Singles Chart, but peaked at number 37 on the NZ Hot Singles Chart.)	—	—	— (Note: "Dustland" did not enter the UK Singles Chart, but peaked at number 29 on the UK Singles Downloads Chart.)		Non-album single
"Wasted Days" (John Mellencamp featuring Bruce Springsteen)	2021	—	—	—	—	—	—	—	—	—	—		Strictly a One-Eyed Jack
"History Books" (The Gaslight Anthem featuring Bruce Springsteen)	2023	—	—	—	—	—	—	—	—	—	—		History Books
"Hollow Man" (Bon Jovi featuring Bruce Springsteen)	2025	—	—	—	—	—	—	—	—	—	—		Forever (Legendary Edition)

=== Albums ===
Year	Artist	Album/single	Contribution	
1977	Ronnie Spector & The E Street Band	Say Goodbye to Hollywood / Baby, Please Don't Go	acoustic guitar	
1978	Robert Gordon with Link Wray	Fresh Fish Special	piano on "Fire"	
1978	The Dictators	Bloodbrothers	vocals on "Faster & Louder"	
1978	Lou Reed	Street Hassle	spoken word/monologue on "Street Hassle"	
1980	Graham Parker	The Up Escalator	backing vocals on "Endless Night" and "Paralyzed"	
1981	Gary U.S. Bonds	Dedication	producer, duet lead vocals on "Jolé Blon"; guitar and vocals on "This Little Girl"; wrote three songs	
1982	Gary U.S. Bonds	On the Line	co-produced with Steve Van Zandt wrote seven songs	
1982	Donna Summer	Donna Summer	guitars/guitar solo, backing vocals on "Protection"	
1982	Little Steven & The Disciples of Soul	Men Without Women	harmony vocals on "Men Without Women", "Angel Eyes" and "Until the Good Is Gone"	
1983	Clarence Clemons & The Red Bank Rockers	Rescue	rhythm guitar on "Savin' Up" producer/guitar on non-album B-side "Summer on Signal Hill"	
1985	Artists United Against Apartheid	Sun City	shared lead vocal on "Sun City"	
1986	Jersey Artists for Mankind	"We've Got the Love" / "Save Love, Save Life"	guitar solo on "We've Got the Love"	
1987	Little Steven	Freedom – No Compromise	duet lead vocal on "Native American"	
1989	Roy Orbison	A Black & White Night Live	backing vocals and guitar	
1989	L. Shankar with The Epidemics	Eye Catcher	harmonica on "Up to You"	
1990	Nils Lofgren	Silver Lining	backing vocal on "Valentine"	
1991	Southside Johnny & The Asbury Jukes	Better Days	shared lead vocal on "It's Been a Long Time" keyboards/guitars/backing vocals on "All the Way Home"	
1991	John Prine	The Missing Years	backing vocal on "Take a Look at My Heart"	
1993	Patti Scialfa	Rumble Doll	guitars and keyboards	
1995	Joe Grushecky & the Houserockers	American Babylon	produced album and provided backing on eight tracks; cowrote "Dark and Bloody Ground" and "Homestead"	
1995	Elliott Murphy	Selling the Gold	guest vocal on "Everything I Do (Leads Me Back to You)"	
1996	Joe Ely	Letter to Laredo	backing vocal on "All Just to Get to You" and "I'm a Thousand Miles from Home"	
1999	Joe Grushecky	Live: Down the Road Apiece	guitar and vocals on "Talking to the King", "Pumping Iron" and "Down the Road Apiece"	
1999	Mike Ness	Cheating at Solitaire	vocals and guitar on "Misery Loves Company"	
2000	Emmylou Harris	Red Dirt Girl	harmony vocals on "Tragedy"	
2000	John Wesley Harding	Awake	duet vocal on "Wreck on the Highway"	
2002	Marah	Float Away with the Friday Night Gods	backing vocal and guitar solo on "Float Away"	
2003	Soozie Tyrell	White Lies	Lead guitar on "White Lines"; Background vocal on "Ste. Genevieve"	
2003	Warren Zevon	The Wind	electric guitar and background vocals on "Disorder In The House" background vocals on "Prison Grove"	
2004	Clarence Clemons	Live in Asbury Park Vol. II	guitar and vocals on "Raise Your Hand"	
2004	Patti Scialfa	23rd Street Lullaby	electric guitar and electronic keyboards on "You Can't Go Back", "Rose" and "Love (Stand Up)"	
2004	Gary U.S. Bonds	Back in 20	guest vocalist with Southside Johnny on "Can't Teach an Old Dog New Tricks"	
2004	Jesse Malin	Messed Up Here Tonight	guitar and vocals on "Wendy"	
2006	Joe Grushecky	A Good Life	vocals and guitar on "Code of Silence", "Is She the One", "A Good Life" and "Searching for My Soul"	
2006	Sam Moore	Overnight Sensational	guest vocals on "Better to Have and Not Need"	
2006	Jerry Lee Lewis	Last Man Standing	backing vocals on "Pink Cadillac"	
2007	Jesse Malin	Glitter in the Gutter	vocals on "Broken Radio"	
2007	Patti Scialfa	Play It as It Lays	guitar	
2009	Bernie Williams	Moving Forward	guitar and vocals on "Glory Days"	
2009	Rosanne Cash	The List	vocals on "Sea of Heartbreak"	
2009	John Fogerty	The Blue Ridge Rangers Rides Again	vocals on "When Will I Be Loved"	
2010	Ray Davies	See My Friends	vocals on "Better Things"	
2010	Alejandro Escovedo	Street Songs of Love	vocals on "Faith"	
2011	Dropkick Murphys	Going Out in Style	duet vocals on "Peg o' My Heart"	
2012	Pete Seeger & Lorre Wyatt	A More Perfect Union	duet vocals on "God's Counting on Me... God's Counting on You"	
2012	Jimmy Fallon	Blow Your Pants Off	duet vocals on "Neil Young Sings 'Whip My Hair'"	
2013	Dropkick Murphys	Rose Tattoo: For Boston Charity EP	guest vocals on re-recording of Dropkick Murphys song "Rose Tattoo". All sales of the iTunes exclusive download go to victims of the Boston Marathon bombing	
2020	Dion	"Hymn to Him"	updated song from Dion's Velvet & Steel (1986) featuring Springsteen (guitar) & Patti Scialfa (vocals)	
2022	John Mellencamp	Strictly a One-Eyed Jack	electric guitar, vocals on "Did You Say Such a Thing" and "A Life Full of Rain"	
2023	The Gaslight Anthem	History Books	vocals on "History Books"	Sources:

== Videography ==
=== Video albums ===
Year	Title	Certification
1989	Video Anthology / 1978-88: Released: January 31, 1989; Label: Columbia Records	US: 3× Platinum
1992	In Concert/MTV Plugged: Released: December 15, 1992; Label: Columbia Records	US: Gold; AUS: Platinum; SPA: Gold
1996	Blood Brothers: Released: March 3, 1996; Label: Columbia Records	US: Gold
2001	The Complete Video Anthology / 1978-2000: Released: January 16, 2001; Label: Columbia Records	AUS: 3× Platinum
2001	Live in New York City: Released: November 6, 2001; Label: Columbia Records	US: 3× Platinum; AUS: 2× Platinum
2003	The Rising: Tour Edition: Released: April 28, 2003; Label: Columbia Records	
2003	Live in Barcelona: Released: November 18, 2003; Label: Columbia Records	US: 4× Platinum; AUS: 3× Platinum
2005	Devils & Dust - DualDisc: Released: April 26, 2005; Label: Columbia Records	
2005	VH1 Storytellers: Released: September 6, 2005; Label: Columbia Records	US: Gold; AUS: Platinum
2005	Wings For Wheels: The Making of Born To Run (Born to Run - 30th Anniversary Edition): Released: November 14, 2005; Label: Columbia Records	
2005	Hammersmith Odeon London '75 (Born to Run - 30th Anniversary Edition): Released: November 14, 2005; Label: Columbia Records	
2006	We Shall Overcome: The Seeger Sessions - DualDisc / American Land Edition: Released: April 25, 2006 / October 3, 2006; Label: Columbia Records	
2007	Live in Dublin: Released: June 5, 2007; Label: Columbia Records	US: Gold; AUS: Platinum
2009	Working on a Dream - Deluxe Edition: Released: January 27, 2009; Label: Columbia Records	
2010	London Calling: Live In Hyde Park: Released: June 22, 2010; Label: Columbia Records	AUS: 2× Platinum
2010	The Promise: The Making of Darkness on the Edge of Town: Released: November 16, 2010; Label: Columbia Records	
2010	Darkness On The Edge Of Town, Paramount Theatre, Asbury Park 2009 / Thrill Hill Vault 1976-1978 (The Promise: The Darkness on the Edge of Town Story): Released: November 16, 2010; Label: Columbia Records	
2010	Thrill Hill Vault Houston '78 Bootleg: House Cut (The Promise: The Darkness on the Edge of Town Story): Released: November 16, 2010; Label: Columbia Records	
2013	Springsteen & I: Released: July 22, 2013; Label: Black Dog Films	
2014	Born in the U.S.A. Live: London 2013 (High Hopes - Deluxe Edition): Released: January 14, 2014; Label: Columbia Records	
2014	A MusiCares Tribute to Bruce Springsteen: Released: March 25, 2014; Label: Columbia Records	
2014	Bruce Springsteen's High Hopes: Released: April 4, 2014; Label: HBO	
2014	High Hopes in South Africa: Released: May 10, 2014; Label: Sony Music Netherlands	
2015	The Ties That Bind (The Ties That Bind: The River Collection): Released: November 27, 2015 (TV) / December 4, 2015 (disc); Label: Columbia Records	UK: Silver
2015	Thrill Hill Vault: The River Tour, Tempe 1980 Concert (The Ties That Bind: The River Collection): Released: December 4, 2015; Label: Columbia Records	UK: Silver
2016	In His Own Words: Released: December 29, 2016; Label: BBC Select	
2018	Springsteen on Broadway: Released: December 16, 2018; Label: Netflix	
2019	Western Stars: Released: October 25, 2019 (theaters); December 19, 2019 (DVD/Blu-ray/digital/streaming); Label: Warner Bros.	
2020	Bruce Springsteen's Letter to You: Released: October 23, 2020; Label: Apple TV+	
2021	The Legendary 1979 No Nukes Concerts: Released: November 19, 2021; Label: Columbia Records	
2024	Road Diary: Bruce Springsteen and the E Street Band: Released: October 25, 2024; Label: Hulu/Disney+	
2025	Inside Tracks II: The Lost Albums: Released: June 20, 2025; Label: Columbia/Sony	
2025	Nebraska '82:Expanded Edition:Count Basie Theatre, Red Bank, NJ - 2025: Released: October 24, 2025; Label: Columbia; Format: Blu-ray	

=== Music videos ===
Year	Title	Director	Ref.
1982	"Atlantic City"	Arnold Levine	
1984	"Dancing in the Dark"	Brian De Palma	
1984	"Born in the U.S.A."	John Sayles	
1985	"I'm on Fire"	John Sayles	
1985	"Glory Days"	John Sayles	
1985	"My Hometown" (live)	Arthur Rosato	
1986	"War" (live)	Arthur Rosato	
1987	"Born to Run" (version 1)	Arthur Rosato	
1987	"Brilliant Disguise"	Meiert Avis	
1987	"Tunnel of Love"	Meiert Avis	
1988	"Born to Run" (version 2)	Meiert Avis	
1988	"One Step Up"	Meiert Avis	
1988	"Tougher Than the Rest" (live)	Meiert Avis	
1988	"Spare Parts" (live)	Carol Dodds	
1992	"Human Touch"	Meiert Avis	
1992	"Better Days"	Meiert Avis	
1992	"57 Channels (And Nothin' On)"	Adam Bernstein	
1992	"Leap of Faith" (live)	Meiert Avis	
1994	"Streets of Philadelphia"	Jonathan Demme and Ted Demme	
1995	"Murder Incorporated" (live)	Jonathan Demme	
1995	"Thunder Road" (live)	Milton Lage	
1995	"Secret Garden"	Peter Care	
1995	"Hungry Heart" (live)	The Torpedo Twins	
1996	"Dead Man Walkin'"	Tim Robbins	
1996	"The Ghost of Tom Joad"	Arnold Levine	
2000	"Highway Patrolman"	Sean Penn	
2000	"If I Should Fall Behind" (live)	Jonathan Demme	
2001	"American Skin (41 Shots)" (live in NYC)	Jonathan Demme	
2002	"Lonesome Day"	Mark Pellington	
2002	"The Rising" (live at the MTV VMAs)		
2002	"Waitin' On a Sunny Day"	Chris Hilson	
2005	"Devils & Dust"	Danny Clinch	
2006	"Bring 'em Home" (live)	Chris Hilson	
2006	"Pay Me My Money Down" (live)	Thom Zimny	
2006	"O Mary Don't You Weep" (live)	Thom Zimny	
2006	"American Land" (live)	Thom Zimny & Chris Hilson	
2006	"How Can a Poor Man Stand Such Times and Live" (live)	Chris Hilson	
2007	"Radio Nowhere"	Thom Zimny	
2007	"Long Walk Home"	Thom Zimny	
2008	"Girls in Their Summer Clothes" (Winter Mix)	Mark Pellington	
2008	"A Night with the Jersey Devil"		
2008	"Working on a Dream"		
2008	"My Lucky Day"		
2008	"Life Itself"		
2009	"The Wrestler"		
2010	"Save My Love"		
2010	"Ain't Good Enough for You"		
2011	"Rocky Ground"		
2012	"We Take Care of Our Own"	Thom Zimny	
2012	"Death to My Hometown" (live)		
2013	"Sólo le Pido a Dios" (live)		
2013	"Dream Baby Dream" (live)		
2013	"High Hopes"	Thom Zimny	
2014	"Just Like Fire Would"	Thom Zimny	
2014	"The Wall" (live)	Thom Zimny	
2014	"American Beauty" (live)	Thom Zimny	
2014	"Hunter of Invisible Game"	Thom Zimny	
2019	"Tucson Train"	Thom Zimny	
2019	"Western Stars" (live)	Thom Zimny	
2020	"Letter to You"	Thom Zimny	
2020	"Ghosts" (live)	Thom Zimny	
2020	"The Power of Prayer"	Thom Zimny	
2022	"Do I Love You (Indeed I Do)"	Thom Zimny	
2022	"Nightshift"	Thom Zimny	
2022	"Don't Play That Song"	Thom Zimny	
2022	"Turn Back the Hands of Time"	Thom Zimny	
2026	"Streets of Minneapolis"	Thom Zimny	
2026	"A Rainy Night in Soho" (Official Lyric Video)	Neel Panchal	
