= E Street Band =

Bruce Springsteen's backing band

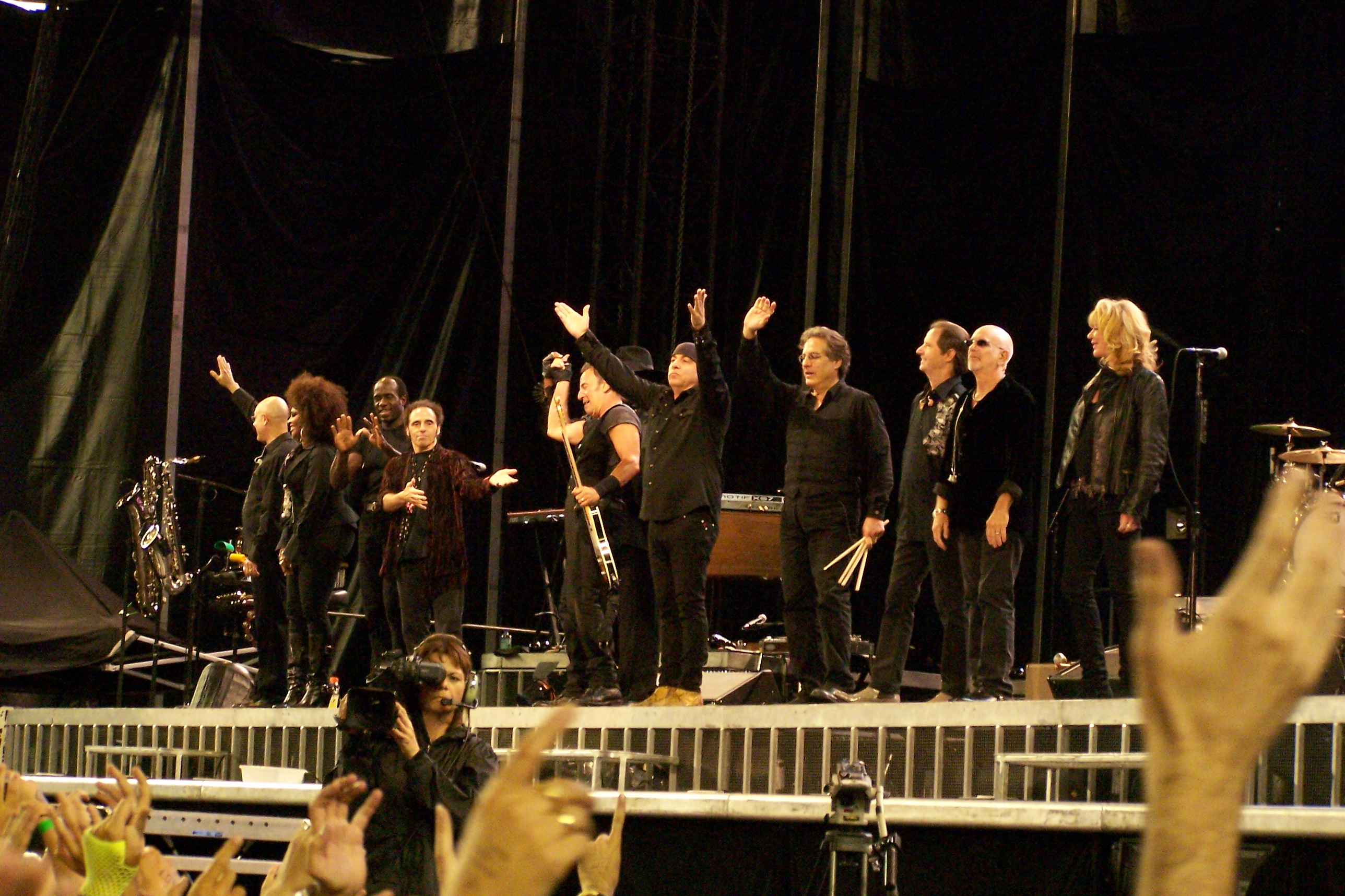
- Bruce Springsteen and the E Street Band at the end of a performance in 2009

Background information
- Origin: Belmar, New Jersey, U.S.
- Genres: Rock; rock and roll
- Years active: 1972–1989; 1995; 1999–present
- Label: Columbia
- Members: Bruce Springsteen; Garry Tallent; Roy Bittan; Max Weinberg; Steven Van Zandt; Nils Lofgren; Patti Scialfa; Soozie Tyrell; Charles Giordano; Jake Clemons
- Past members: Clarence Clemons; Danny Federici; Vini Lopez; David Sancious; Ernest Carter

The E Street Band is an American rock band that has been the primary backing band for rock musician Bruce Springsteen since 1972. For the bulk of Springsteen's recording and performing career, the band consisted of guitarists Steven Van Zandt, Nils Lofgren, and Patti Scialfa, keyboardists Danny Federici and Roy Bittan, bassist Garry Tallent, drummer Max Weinberg and saxophonist Clarence Clemons. In 2014, the E Street Band was inducted into the Rock and Roll Hall of Fame.

When not working with Springsteen, members of the band have recorded solo material and have pursued successful careers as session musicians, record producers, songwriters, actors and other roles in entertainment.

== History ==
=== Members ===
The E Street Band was founded in October 1972, but it was not formally named until September 1974. Springsteen has put together other backing bands during his career, but the E Street Band has been together more or less continuously since its inception.

The original lineup included Garry Tallent (bass), Clarence Clemons (saxophone), Danny Federici (keyboards, accordion), Vini "Mad Dog" Lopez (drums) and David Sancious (keyboards). The band took its name from the street in Belmar, New Jersey, where Sancious's mother lived; she allowed the band to rehearse in her garage. Tourists to the area seeking early Springsteen haunts often mistakenly believe the house was on the corner of E Street and 10th Avenue, perhaps due to the song "Tenth Avenue Freeze-Out" about the band's beginnings. The Sancious house was at 1107 E Street with the garage squeezed between the house and the southside fence.

Springsteen's debut Greetings from Asbury Park, N.J. was released in January 1973, and the band's first national tour began in October 1972. Sancious, even though he played on the album, missed that first tour. It was not until June 1973 that he began appearing regularly on stage with the band.

In February 1974, Lopez was asked to resign, and was briefly replaced by Ernest "Boom" Carter. A few months later, in August 1974, Sancious and Carter left to form their own jazz-fusion band called Tone. They were replaced in September 1974 by Roy Bittan (keyboards) and Max Weinberg (drums). Violinist Suki Lahav was briefly a member of the band before leaving in March 1975 to emigrate to Israel (where she would later find success as a songwriter and novelist). Steven Van Zandt (guitar, vocals), who had long been associated with Springsteen and had played in previous bands with him, officially joined the band in July 1975.

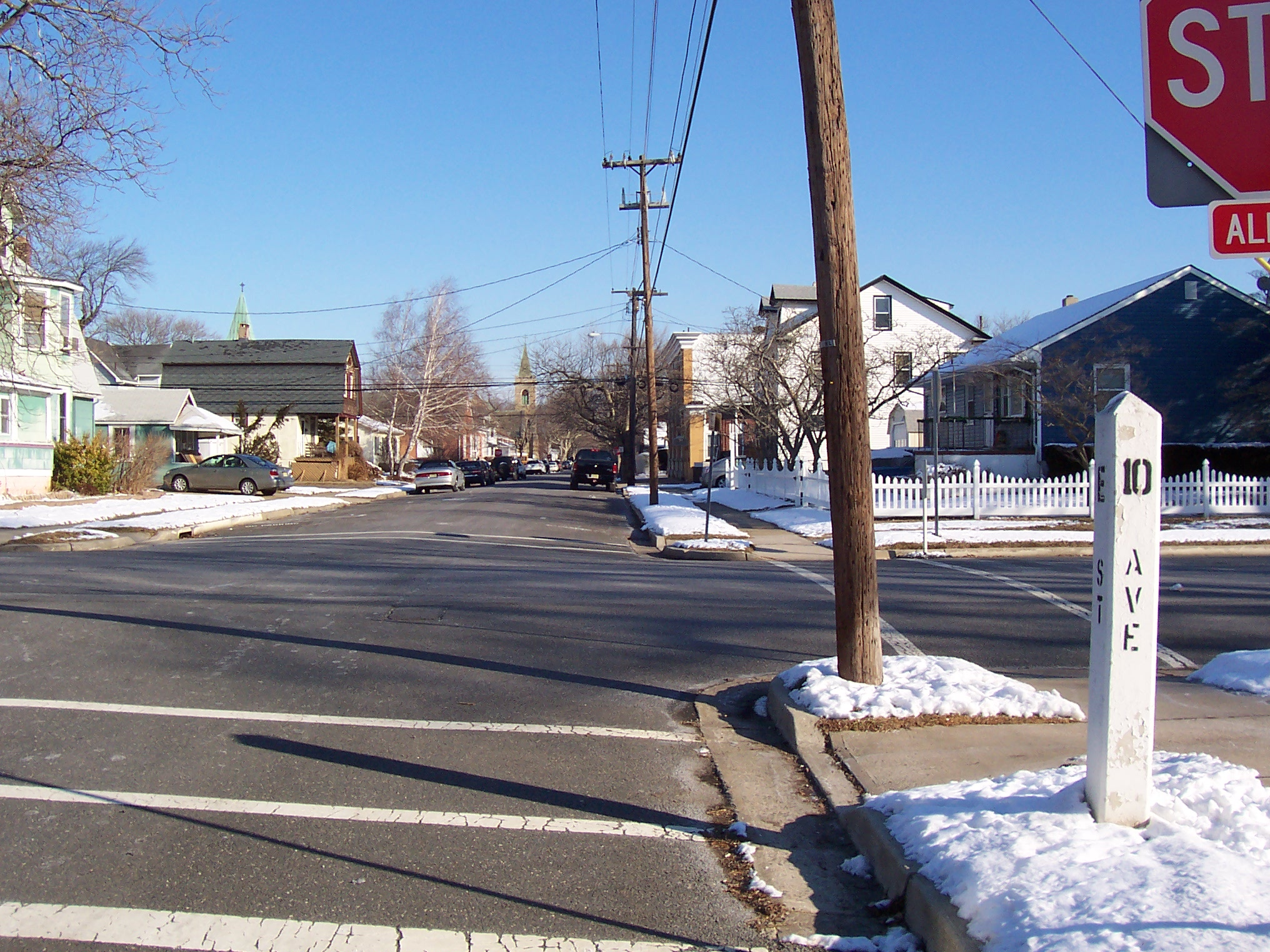
The intersection of E Street & 10th Avenue in Belmar, New Jersey

This lineup remained stable until the early 1980s when Van Zandt left to pursue his own career, a move that was announced in 1984. He would later rejoin the band in 1995. In June 1984, Nils Lofgren (guitar, vocals) was added to replace Van Zandt; Springsteen's future wife Patti Scialfa (vocals, later guitar) was also added to the lineup.

By 2002, the band also included Soozie Tyrell (violin, guitar, vocals). Tyrell had earlier worked with Scialfa touring with Southside Johnny and the Asbury Jukes and sporadically with Springsteen dating back to the early 1990s. Whether Tyrell became as full-fledged a member as the others remains unclear. Some press releases refer to her as a "special guest", the cover notes of Live in Barcelona list her as a "with" member, the liner notes of We Shall Overcome: The Seeger Sessions refer to her as "violinist with the E Street Band", and some press releases don't mention her at all. When asked about the lack of mention in a press release prior to the Magic Tour, Springsteen just said in response, "Soozie will be with us."

On November 21, 2007, it was announced that Danny Federici would take a leave of absence from Springsteen and the E Street Band's ongoing Magic Tour to pursue treatment for melanoma, and was temporarily replaced by veteran musician Charles Giordano. Springsteen stated at the time: "Danny is one of the pillars of our sound and has played beside me as a great friend for more than 40 years. We all eagerly await his healthy and speedy return." Federici made his only return to the stage on March 20, 2008, when he appeared for portions of a Springsteen and E Street Band performance at Conseco Fieldhouse in Indianapolis; he died on April 17 that year at the Memorial Sloan-Kettering Cancer Center in New York City, having suffered for three years with melanoma. Springsteen's album Working on a Dream is dedicated to him. Giordano has since become an unofficial member of the band.

Clarence Clemons suffered a stroke on June 12, 2011. While initial signs had been hopeful after his hospitalization and two subsequent brain surgeries, he reportedly took a turn for the worse later in the week and died on June 18. Clemons' nephew Jake has filled his role on the saxophone since 2012. Clemons' death left Springsteen, Sancious, Tallent, and Lopez as the four remaining original members.

On occasions (e.g. their Super Bowl XLIII performance) the lineup has been augmented by a horn section, sometimes referred to as the Miami Horns. Its most prominent members include Richie Rosenberg (trombone) and Mark Pender (trumpet).

=== Origins in Asbury Park ===
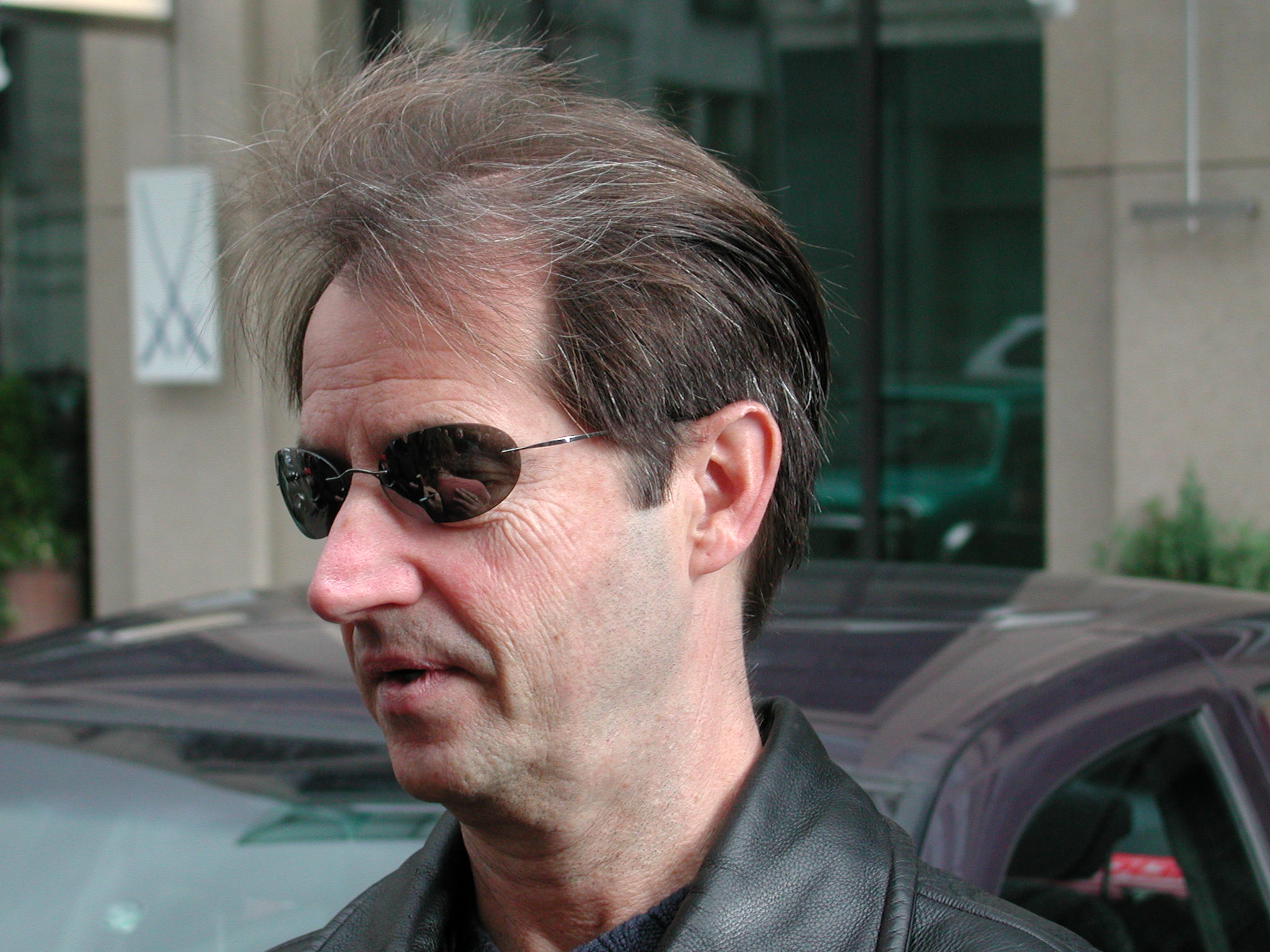
Garry W. Tallent

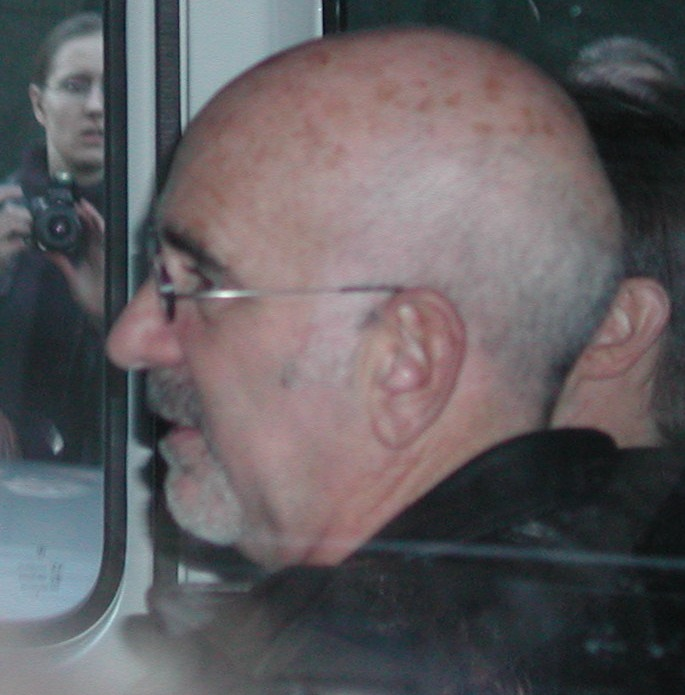
Roy Bittan

In the late 1960s and early 1970s, there was a vibrant music scene in and around the City of Asbury Park on the Jersey Shore. Prominent in this scene were Bruce Springsteen and Southside Johnny as well as the early members of the E Street Band. Clemons, Federici, Lopez, Sancious, Tallent and Van Zandt honed their skills in numerous bands, both with and without Springsteen. These included Little Melvin & the Invaders, the Downtown Tangiers Band, the Jaywalkers, Moment of Truth, Glory Road, Child, Steel Mill, Dr. Zoom & the Sonic Boom, the Sundance Blues Band, and the Bruce Springsteen Band. In 1972, when Springsteen gained a recording contract with CBS, he picked the cherries among Jersey Shore musicians to record — and to tour in support of — his debut album, Greetings from Asbury Park, N.J. By 1973, they had recorded a second album with Springsteen, The Wild, the Innocent and the E Street Shuffle.

=== Album credits ===
The E Street Band established its reputation among studio musicians in the 1970s and the 1980s with its significant contribution to the Springsteen albums Born to Run, Darkness on the Edge of Town, The River and Born in the U.S.A. However, unlike such backing bands as the Silver Bullet Band or the Heartbreakers, the E Street Band never received a full credit on a Springsteen studio album. Only individual band members were credited. Even though the band did all or nearly all of the playing on these albums, each was released solely under Springsteen's name. Indeed, the E Street Band is not even mentioned as such in any of the literature for these albums until an inside liner note for The River, and then a cover "Performed by" credit on Born in the U.S.A. Later albums such as Tunnel of Love and Greatest Hits did name the band and list the members.

Concerts were a different story. Live performances were almost always billed as Bruce Springsteen & the E Street Band, and Springsteen pointed the spotlight on the brand logo style of the band onstage. In each concert, Springsteen typically would extend one song (between 1974 and 1984, almost always "Rosalita") to involve an elaborate introduction of each member of the band, introducing nicknames, characterizing each player ("Professor" Roy Bittan, "Miami" Steve Van Zandt, "Phantom" Dan Federici, "Mighty" Max Weinberg, and Garry "W." Tallent), whipping the song and the audience into a frenzy for the final, over-the-top introduction of the "Big Man", Clarence Clemons. More substantially, Springsteen split concert revenues equally with the band members, a practice almost unheard of for backing bands in the music industry.

Thus in 1979 when Springsteen and the band featured on the No Nukes album and No Nukes film, the live performance was credited to both. The band received their first full credit on a Springsteen album with the release of Live/1975–85, which was credited to Bruce Springsteen & the E Street Band. All subsequent live recordings and concert DVDs have also been credited to both.

=== Southside Johnny, Ronnie Spector, and Gary U.S. Bonds ===
Van Zandt also began to establish himself a reputation as a producer/songwriter. Apart from helping out with production on Springsteen albums, he worked with his "other band", Southside Johnny & the Asbury Jukes, as well as with Ronnie Spector and Gary U.S. Bonds, before he launched his own solo career as Little Steven. The E Street Band and Springsteen regularly helped out on all these projects. In 1977, they recorded a single with Ronnie Spector featuring a cover of the Billy Joel song, "Say Goodbye to Hollywood", and a Van Zandt original, "Baby Please Don't Go". This was the first time the band received a full credit. In 1978, Weinberg became an "honorary Juke" when he recorded Hearts of Stone with Southside Johnny.

In the early 1980s, the E Street Band helped re-launch the career of Gary U.S. Bonds, when it provided backup on two albums, Dedication and On the Line. Van Zandt produced both with Springsteen. Each album featured songs by Springsteen and Van Zandt, and a cover of the Cajun classic "Jole Blon". The moderate success of these albums earned Van Zandt a solo recording contract with EMI. Initially without a band of his own, he simply borrowed Clemons, Federici, Tallent, Weinberg, and an assortment of Jukes, including Rosenberg and Pender, to record his 1982 debut Men Without Women. This was released under the name of Little Steven & the Disciples of Soul.

=== Courtesy of the E Street Band ===
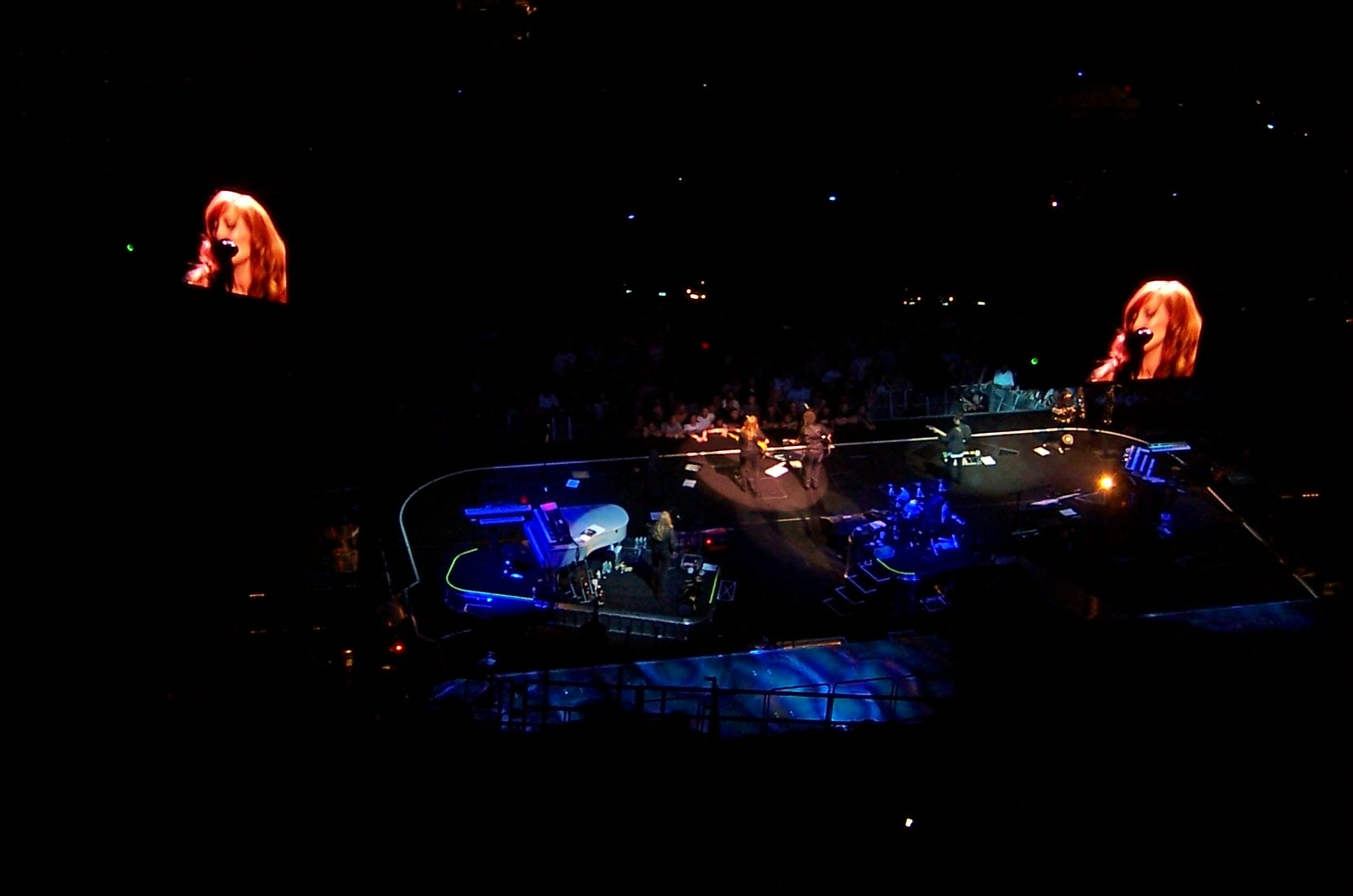
Patti Scialfa performs with the E Street Band, Hartford Civic Center, October 2, 2007

Other artists had also begun to recognize their talents and the band members were never out of work. Producer/songwriter Jim Steinman used Bittan and Weinberg on Meat Loaf's Bat Out of Hell and Dead Ringer; on his own Bad for Good project; Bonnie Tyler's Faster Than the Speed of Night and Secret Dreams and Forbidden Fire albums; and Greatest Hits from Air Supply, on the cut, "Making Love Out of Nothing at All" which featured an extra expansive Wall of Sound effect from Bittan & Weinberg. Also, Tallent, Bittan, and Weinberg, along with Mick Ronson, recorded an album with Ian Hunter titled You're Never Alone with a Schizophrenic. Bittan and Federici also provided keyboards for Garland Jeffreys on his Escape Artist, while the former would make notable contributions to albums by David Bowie, Dire Straits, Bob Seger and Stevie Nicks. Several of these albums acknowledged their contributions with a credit such as "courtesy of the E Street Band".

Throughout the 1980s, members of the band were involved with various other projects. In 1985, Bittan and Van Zandt recorded sessions with Bob Dylan for his Empire Burlesque album. Although not used at the time, the recordings later surfaced on Dylan's The Bootleg Series. In 1985, Van Zandt spearheaded Artists United Against Apartheid. An album and single featured Springsteen and Clemons, among others. Tallent also produced a single with Jersey Artists For Mankind which featured Springsteen, Lofgren, Clemons and Weinberg as well as Carter and Rosenberg. Clemons teamed up with Sancious both on his solo album Hero and on albums with Zucchero Fornaciari. Clemons and Lofgren also went on tour with Ringo Starr and his All-Starr Band in 1989.

=== Breakup ===
In 1989, Springsteen informed the E Street Band members that he would not be using their services for the foreseeable future. He had already recorded one completely solo album, Nebraska. The last full band activity had been autumn 1988's Human Rights Now! Tour. Band members started to go their separate ways and onto separate projects — Tallent to Nashville to work on record production, Federici to California, Clemons to Florida, Lofgren to Maryland to resume his long-time solo activities. Weinberg, besides a short attempt at law school, was putting together the band Killer Joe and recording an album. Scene of the Crime included a guest appearance from Little Steven, playing guitar on the Springsteen written instrumental "Summer On Signal Hill". In 1993, Weinberg became the band leader on Late Night with Conan O'Brien and remained such for its entire run. When O'Brien moved to The Tonight Show in 2009, Weinberg reprised his role as bandleader, and the show's house band — formerly called the Max Weinberg 7 — was redubbed Max Weinberg and the Tonight Show Band.

In 1992, the E Street Band and the Miami Horns backed Darlene Love on the single "All Alone on Christmas" written by Little Steven and featured on the soundtrack for Home Alone 2: Lost in New York.

Springsteen made guest appearances on solo albums by both Nils Lofgren and Clarence Clemons and he joined Max Weinberg, Garry Tallent and Little Steven when they reprised their role as "honorary Jukes" on Southside Johnny's Better Days in 1992.

Springsteen also continued to use assorted members of the band on his forthcoming albums and projects. Roy Bittan would be retained for both Human Touch and Lucky Town. The former included a guest appearance from David Sancious while the latter introduced Soozie Tyrell. Patti Scialfa also provided backing vocals on both. Little Steven produced and played guitar on a remix of the single "57 Channels". However, the majority of musicians used on these albums were session musicians. The E Street Band was not used on the subsequent Springsteen tour either, although Bittan was again retained and Scialfa occasionally added backing vocals; both were consequently featured on In Concert/MTV Plugged. The Ghost of Tom Joad saw Danny Federici, Garry Tallent, Tyrell and Scialfa provide backing on some tracks while Federici, Tyrell and Scialfa all turn up sporadically on Devils & Dust.

Although individual members of the band played on Human Touch, Lucky Town, In Concert/MTV Plugged, The Ghost of Tom Joad and Devils & Dust, none of these albums are regarded as E Street Band albums. Tunnel of Love falls into a grey area and its status is open to debate.

=== Reunion era, Hall of Fame induction, future with Springsteen ===
In 1995, Springsteen released Greatest Hits and the E Street Band was temporarily reunited to record four new songs. In 1998, he released Tracks, a box set collection of unreleased recordings dating back to 1972, many of which featured the band.

Finally in 1999, Springsteen and the E Street Band reunited on a more substantial basis, 10 years after he had dismissed them. They staged an extremely successful Reunion Tour, culminating in an HBO special and collection Live in New York City. With the exception of Weinberg and Van Zandt, the members of the band had not been in the public eye. There seemed to be no long-term animosity from the split.

In 2002, the reunion was continued with the release of new studio album The Rising and the long, successful Rising Tour. Another release from this era was The Essential Bruce Springsteen, another greatest hits package combined with more archival material.

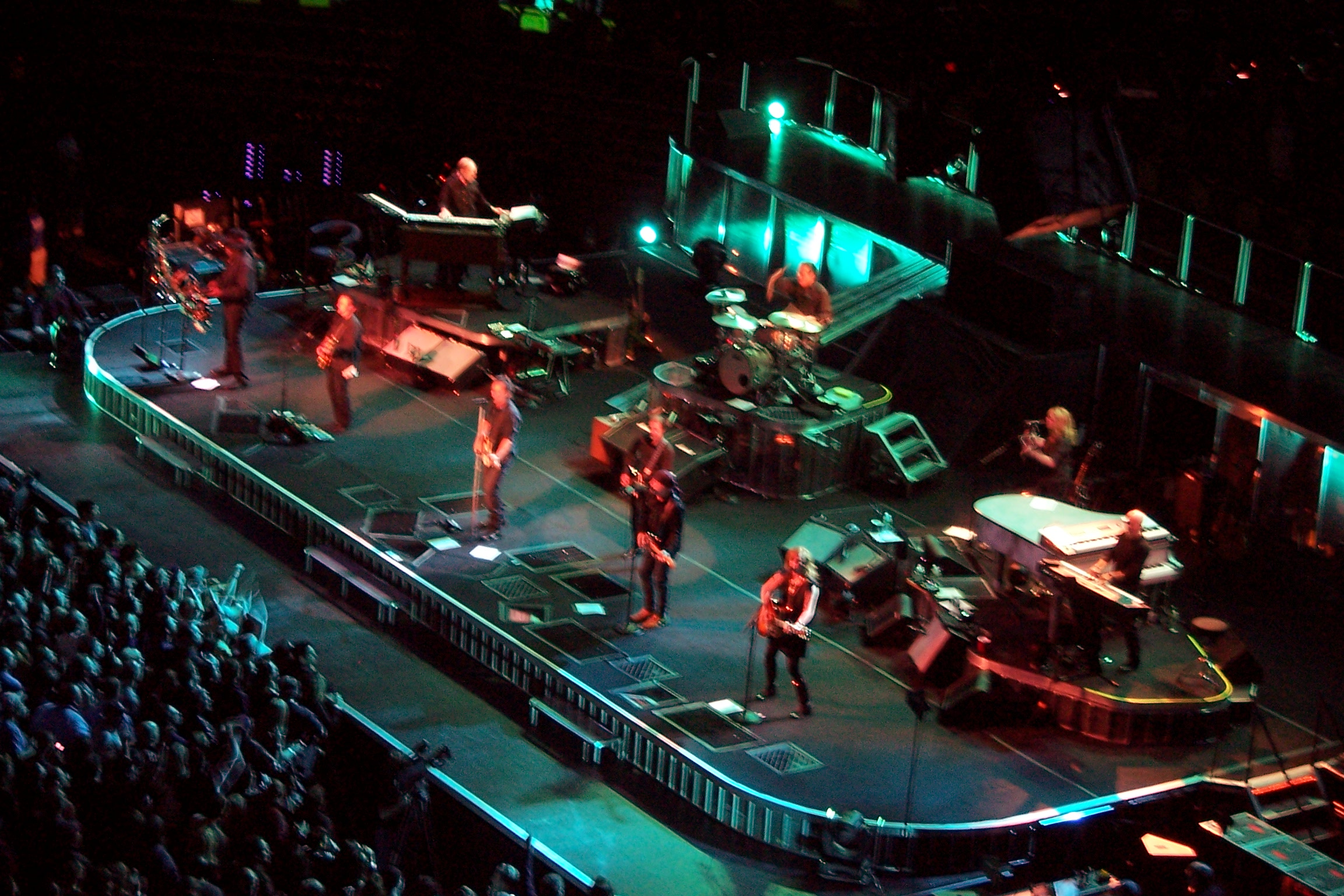
The E Street Band in performance in November 2007 during Magic Tour; this was the next-to-last full performance of Danny Federici.

The October 2004 Vote for Change tour was the last E Street Band effort for a while. The 2005 Devils & Dust album used scatterings of Federici, Scialfa, and Tyrell, while the 2006 Sessions Band Tour used Scialfa and Tyrell among the largely numbered backing musicians. During the latter, Springsteen mentioned he did plan to work with the E Street Band again in the future, but was vague about details.

Finally, in early 2007, E Street Band members separately traveled to Atlanta to contribute to Springsteen's Magic. Concurrent with the album's release in October 2007, the Magic Tour began. However, after the conclusion of the tour's first leg on November 19, 2007, Danny Federici took a leave of absence from the tour to pursue treatment for melanoma; he was replaced by Sessions Band member Charles Giordano. Federici made his only return to the stage on March 20, 2008, when he appeared for portions of a Springsteen and E Street Band performance in Indianapolis. He died on April 17, 2008.

Final frame of cartoon-style E! – Street! – Band! video screen sequence at the end of Magic Tour shows.

Springsteen had always given elaborate band introductions during shows, often incorporating humorous characterizations of band members or stories of how they had joined and always building up to an over-the-top introduction of "Master of the Universe" stage foil Clarence Clemons. Springsteen used the ending of the Reunion Tour's band intro song, "Tenth Avenue Freeze-Out", to introduce a more specially branded sequence to emphasize his view of the E Street Band's greatness. This practice continued on "Mary's Place" on The Rising Tour and at the end of the Magic Tour shows with "American Land". The exact wording varied, but generally was some form of the following:

[city]!
[city]!
You've just seen...the heart-stopping, pants-dropping, house-rocking, earth-quaking, booty-shaking, Viagra-taking, love-making –
Le-gen-dary E – Street – Band!

On the Magic Tour, the video screens around the stage added cartoon-like graphics to illustrate the final E! Street! Band! exclamation.

In the wake of the passing of Federici and then Clemons, Springsteen amended the introduction to "testifying, death-defying, legendary E Street Band!"

Bruce Springsteen and the E Street Band were the stars of the Super Bowl XLIII Halftime Show in Tampa, Florida, on February 1, 2009. Springsteen's "heart-stopping ..." rap was included in the promotional material aired on NBC in the two months leading up to the performance. The sequence then got its biggest audience immediately prior to Springsteen and the band taking the stage at halftime, when a prerecorded series of football players from the game saying each phrase in turn was aired by way of introducing the performance.

Prior to the game, on Thursday, January 29, Springsteen gave a rare press conference, where he promised a "twelve minute party". When asked if he would be nervous performing before such a large audience, Springsteen alluded to his recent January 18, 2009, appearance at the "We Are One" concert at the Lincoln Memorial, a celebration of Barack Obama's Presidential inauguration: "You'll have a lot of crazy football fans, but you won't have Lincoln staring over your shoulder. That takes some of the pressure off." The Super Bowl performance coincided with the release of a new album titled Working on a Dream, released on January 27, 2009. The band's set, which ran a little over the allotted 12 minutes, included the songs "Tenth Avenue Freeze-Out", "Born to Run", "Working on a Dream", and "Glory Days". The Miami Horns and a large choir, the Joyce Garrett Singers, joined the band onstage.

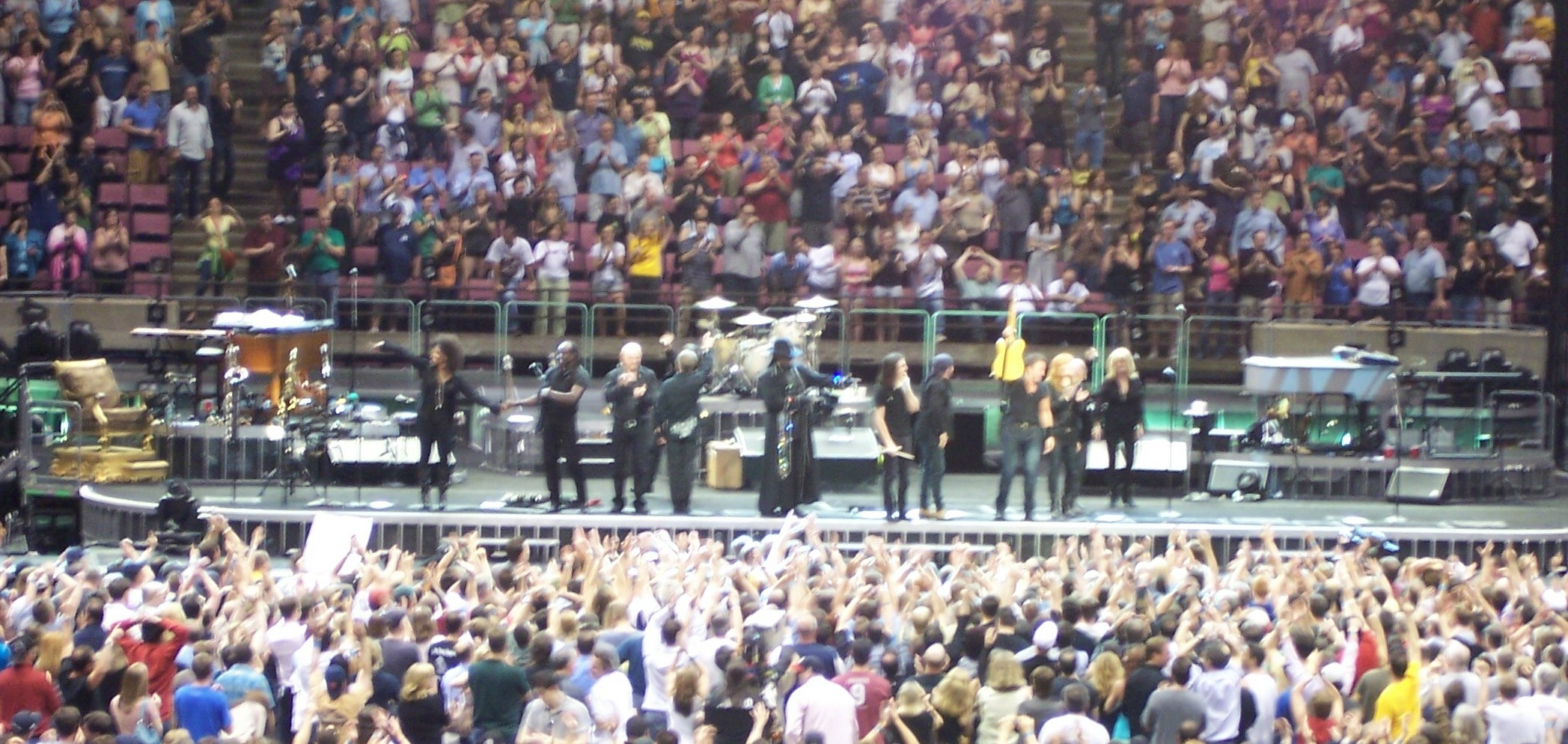
The E Street Band at the end of a Working on a Dream Tour show in May 2009. Jay Weinberg was subbing for his father on this show, and backing vocalists Curtis King and Cindy Mizelle augmented the lineup.

Nineteen-year-old Jay Weinberg filled in at drums for his father, Max, during portions of shows, or for some full shows, during the 2009 Working on a Dream Tour. This was due to the elder Weinberg's obligations for the debuting The Tonight Show with Conan O'Brien.

On June 12, 2011, Clarence Clemons suffered a stroke and died six days later from resulting complications, on June 18 at age 69. Steve Van Zandt wrote on his web site "We will continue to make music and perform. Let's face it, that's all we really know how to do. But it will be very different without him." On February 11, 2012, Springsteen announced that Jake Clemons, the nephew of Clarence Clemons, would tour with the E Street Band as the group's new saxophonist, splitting time with Eddie Manion. Augmented by a full horn section, an additional percussionist Everett Bradley, and an additional singer and rapper in Michelle Moore, the E Street Band that undertook the 2012–2013 Wrecking Ball Tour was the largest yet. Guitarist Tom Morello, best known for his work with Rage Against the Machine, filled in for Van Zandt on some of the dates.

On December 17, 2013, the Rock and Roll Hall of Fame announced that the E Street Band would be inducted in 2014 under The Award for Musical Excellence induction category. The band was inducted by Springsteen on April 10, 2014. Bittan, Clemons, Federici, Lofgren, Lopez, Scialfa, Sancious, Tallent, Weinberg, and Van Zandt were all inducted and each given time to speak, with the family of Federici and Clemons representing them. Following the induction, Springsteen and the E Street Band — with Lopez, Sancious and The E Street Horns — performed "The E Street Shuffle", "The River" and "Kitty's Back". "They should have figured it out before the band started passing away," grumbled Lofgren. "Clarence and especially Danny both took our exclusion hard, and neither is with us any more. So it was a bittersweet night."

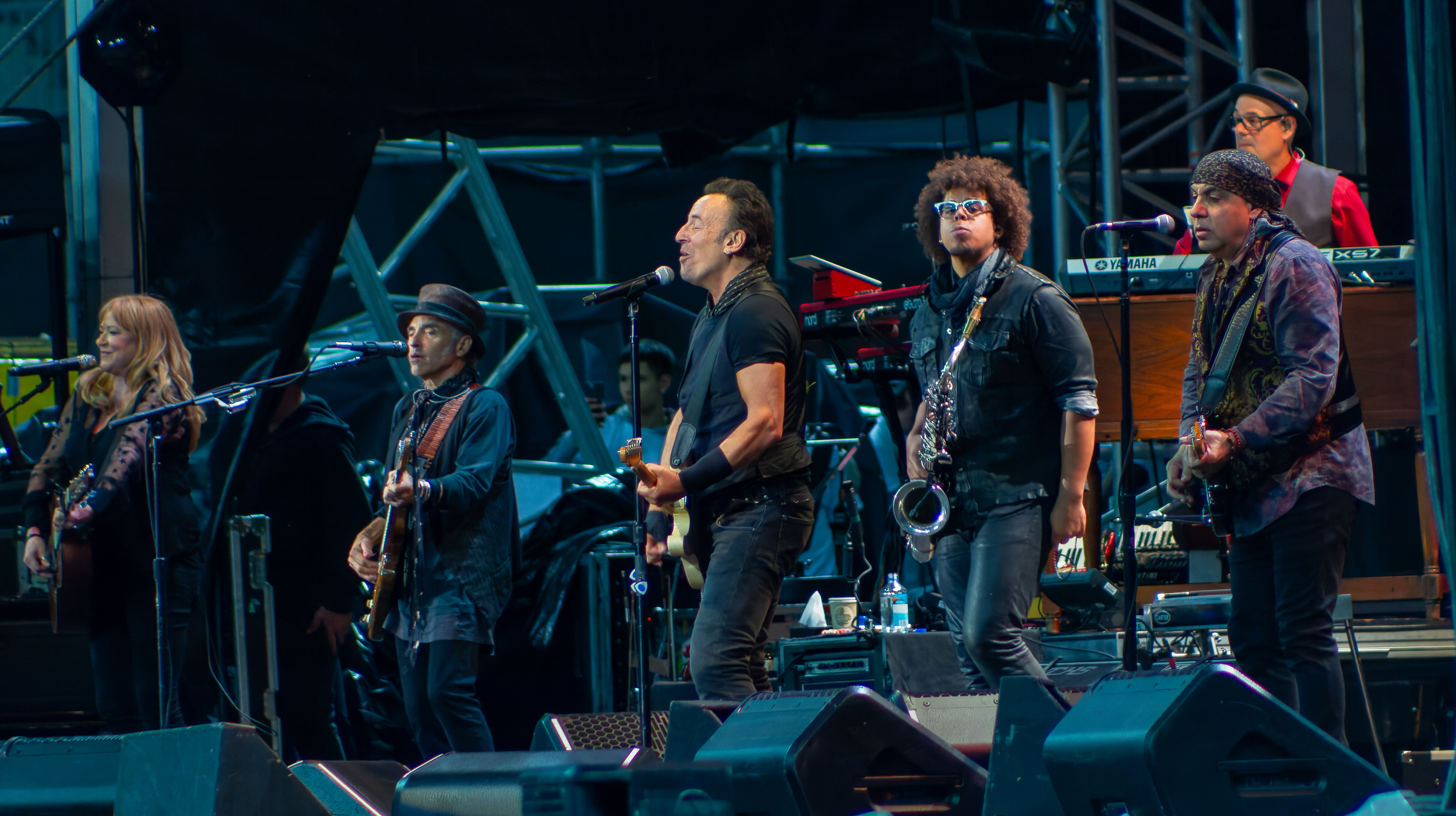
Springsteen and the E Street Band performing at Wembley Stadium in June 2016

The High Hopes Tour kicked off in January 2014 and concluded in May 2014. The band was again joined by the horn section and by Tom Morello for the entire tour. Van Zandt missed most of the North American leg due to filming his television series, Lilyhammer. The tour supported Springsteen's 2014 album, High Hopes. Jake Clemons' role in the band had been expanded and his interactions on stage with Springsteen were like those of his uncle. In 2015, Springsteen announced plans for The River Tour 2016. He had originally planned a solo tour, but felt that it would delay his next tour with the E Street Band for a few years. Envisaged as a short tour, it expanded to an eight-month outing from January to September 2016. The tour did not include Morello or the horn section, with the exception of Clemons. The band's second show in Philadelphia on September 9, 2016, was amongst the longest shows of Springsteen's career, clocking in at 4 hours and 4 minutes, two minutes shy of his longest show ever in 2012. An 11-date tour of Australia and New Zealand called Summer '17 took place in January and February 2017.

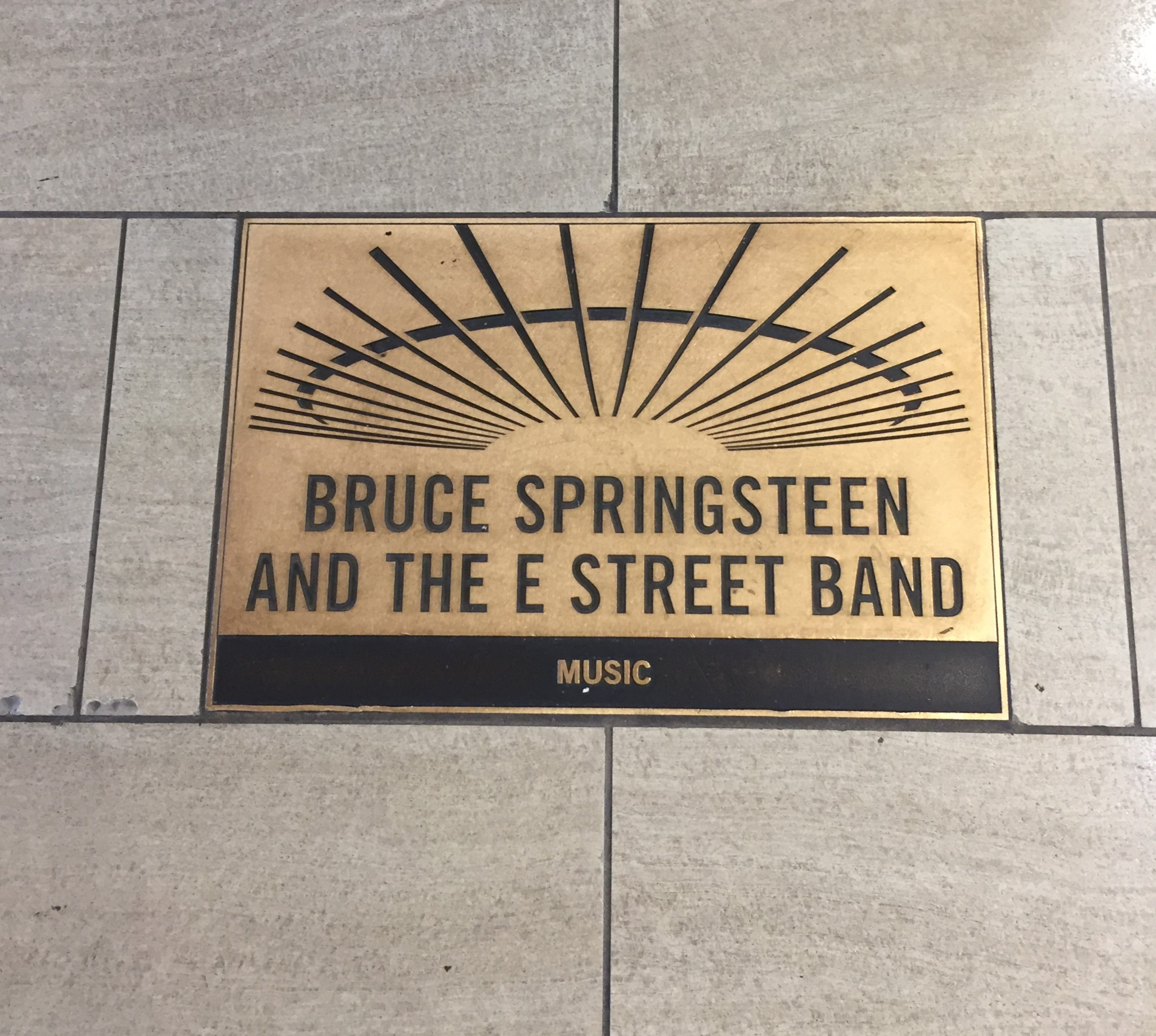
E Street Band's Madison Square Garden walk of fame plaque.

After the Summer '17 tour ended, Springsteen performed a solo concert residency on Broadway. Springsteen on Broadway ran from October 3, 2017, to December 15, 2018. He then announced that new music was on the way but the E Street Band would not be touring in 2019 because he was taking a break after his Broadway run and various recording projects. In April 2019 it was announced that Springsteen's next album, Western Stars, would be a solo release without the E Street Band. The COVID-19 pandemic then prevented any touring in 2020, but on October 23, 2020, Springsteen released his twentieth studio album, Letter to You. The album marked the first release featuring the E Street Band since 2014's High Hopes.

In June 2021, Springsteen announced that he was talked into resuming his Springsteen on Broadway performances by a "friend" in the summer of 2021, but he confirmed there would be an E Street Band tour in 2022. He stated, "It gives me something to do this summer so I won't be lazying around on the beach. I knew we were going to tour with the band next year so I said I'll take some time off." Springsteen also discussed future music releases, saying, "We have something coming out in the fall. I'm not sure if it's been announced yet. I got projects I've been working on basically that are slated for release either next year or in the fall. Not new records, but things I think the fans are going to be interested in."

A US and European tour was announced in May 2022 and began in February 2023. It later stretched into 2024 after various shows were postponed due to Springsteen's treatment for peptic ulcer disease and other members of the band having COVID-19. The tour ultimately extended into 2025.

On February 17, 2026, Springsteen and the E Street Band announced plans for a 20-date North American 2026 arena tour. The Land of Hope and Dreams American Tour began on March 31 in Minneapolis and is scheduled to conclude on May 30 in Philadelphia. The tour is in response to President Donald Trump. "We are living through dark, disturbing and dangerous times, but do not despair — the cavalry is coming! ... We will be rocking your town in celebration and in defense of America — American democracy, American freedom, our American Constitution and our sacred American dream — all of which are under attack by our wannabe king and his rogue government in Washington, D.C. Everyone, regardless of where you stand or what you believe in, is welcome — so come on out and join the United Free Republic of E Street Nation for an American spring of Rock 'n' Rebellion! I'll see you there!" Springsteen said in a video statement to announce the tour.Tom Morello will appear at all dates on selected songs.

Suki Lahav, who was a touring member on the 1974–1975 Born to Run tour and who performed violin on "Jungleland" and provided backing vocals on "4th of July, Asbury Park (Sandy)", died on April 1, 2026. Max Weinberg paid tribute to Lahav, saying, "The bond we forged grew stronger and stronger as we toured throughout the US Northeast and Midwest during the fall of 1974. Suki, Louie, and Tal, their beautiful young daughter who received her own nickname, Scooter, were there along with the rest of us striving to spread what Bruce has always called the 'Ministry of Rock and Roll,' E Street style." Springsteen issued his own statement, saying, "Here on E Street, we're heartbroken over the passing of Suki Lahav. Her angelic voice shone on '4th of July, Asbury Park (Sandy)' and her beautiful violin brought great drama to the 'Jungleland' intro. She also blessed our stage with her beauty and grace in our early touring days."

== Tours ==
- Born to Run tours, 1974–1977
- Darkness Tour, 1978–1979
- The River Tour, 1980–1981
- Born in the U.S.A. Tour, 1984–1985
- Tunnel of Love Express Tour, 1988
- Amnesty International Human Rights Now! Tour, 1988
- Reunion Tour, 1999–2000
- The Rising Tour, 2002–2003
- Vote for Change Tour, 2004
- Magic Tour, 2007–2008
- Working On a Dream Tour, 2009
- Wrecking Ball Tour, 2012–2013
- High Hopes Tour, 2014
- The River Tour 2016, 2016
- Summer '17, 2017
- Springsteen and E Street Band 2023–2025 Tour, 2023–2025
- Land of Hope and Dreams American Tour, 2026

== Band members ==
=== Current official members ===
- Bruce Springsteen – lead vocals, guitars, harmonica, keyboards (1972–1989, 1995, 1999–present)
- Garry Tallent – bass, backing vocals (1972–1989, 1995, 1999–present)
- Roy Bittan – piano, accordion, keyboards, backing vocals (1974–1989, 1995, 1999–present)
- Max Weinberg – drums, percussion, backing vocals (1974–1989, 1995, 1999–present)
- Steven Van Zandt – rhythm and lead guitars, harmony and backing vocals, mandolin (1975–1984, 1995, 1999–present)
- Nils Lofgren – lead and rhythm guitars, backing vocals, accordion (1984–1989, 1995, 1999–present)
- Patti Scialfa – harmony and backing vocals, rhythm guitar, keyboards, synthesizers (1984–1989, 1995, 1999–present) (in 2018, due to various health issues, Scialfa has cut back appearances with the band and no longer tours)

with

- Soozie Tyrell – backing vocals, violin, percussion, acoustic rhythm guitar (2002–present)
- Charles Giordano – organ, accordion, synthesizer (2008–present)
- Jake Clemons – saxophones, backing vocals, percussion (2012–present)

=== Current touring members ===
- Tom Morello - guitar, backing vocals (2013–2014, 2026, guest appearances 2008, 2009)

=== Current members of the E Street Horns and Percussion ===
- Ed Manion – tenor and baritone saxophone, percussion (1976, 1984, 1988, 2012–2014, 2023–present)
- Curt Ramm – trumpet, percussion (2009, 2012–2014, 2023–present)
- Barry Danielian – trumpet, percussion (2012–2014, 2023–present)
- Ozzie Melendez – trombone, percussion (2023–present)
- Anthony Almonte – percussion, backing vocals (2023–present)

=== Current touring members of the E Street Choir ===
- Curtis King – backing vocals, percussion (2009–2014, 2023–present)
- Michelle Moore – vocals (2012–2014, 2023–present)
- Lisa Lowell – vocals (2023–present)
- Ada Dyer – vocals (2023–present)

=== Former official members ===
- Clarence Clemons – tenor, baritone, and soprano saxophones, backing vocals, percussion (1972–1989, 1995, 1999–2011; his death)
- Danny Federici – organ, accordion, glockenspiel, backing vocals (1972–1989, 1995, 1999–2008; inactive from touring, 2007–2008; his death)
- David Sancious – piano, organ, keyboards, backing vocals (1972–1974, guest appearances 1988, 2014, 2025)
- Vini Lopez – drums, backing vocals (1972–1974, guest appearances 2003, 2009, 2012, 2014, 2016)
- Ernest Carter – drums (1974, guest appearance 2025)

=== Former touring members ===
- Suki Lahav – violin, backing vocals (1974–1975; died 2026)
- Jay Weinberg – drums (2009)

Period	Members	Studio releases
1972–1974	Bruce Springsteen – lead vocals, guitar, piano, harmonica; Clarence Clemons – tenor, baritone and soprano saxophones, backing vocals, percussion; Danny Federici – organ, accordion, backing vocals; David Sancious – piano, organ, keyboards, backing vocals; Garry Tallent – bass, tuba, backing vocals; Vini Lopez – drums, backing vocals	Greetings from Asbury Park, N.J. (1973); The Wild, the Innocent & the E Street Shuffle (1973)
1974	Bruce Springsteen – lead vocals, guitar, harmonica; Clarence Clemons – tenor, baritone and soprano saxophones, backing vocals, percussion; Danny Federici – organ, accordion, glockenspiel, backing vocals; David Sancious – piano, organ; Garry Tallent – bass, tuba; Ernest Carter – drums	
1974–1975	Bruce Springsteen – lead vocals, guitar, harmonica; Clarence Clemons – tenor, baritone and soprano saxophones, backing vocals, percussion; Danny Federici – organ, accordion, glockenspiel, backing vocals; Garry Tallent – bass, tuba; Roy Bittan – piano, organ, harpsichord, backing vocals; Max Weinberg – drums; Touring members: Suki Lahav – violin, backing vocals	Born to Run (1975)
1975	Bruce Springsteen – lead and backing vocals, guitar, harmonica, piano; Clarence Clemons – tenor, baritone and soprano saxophones, backing vocals, percussion; Danny Federici – organ, piano, accordion, glockenspiel, backing vocals; Garry Tallent – bass, backing vocals, percussion; Roy Bittan – piano, keyboards, backing vocals; Max Weinberg – drums, backing vocals	
1975–1983	Bruce Springsteen – lead and backing vocals, guitar, harmonica, piano; Clarence Clemons – tenor, baritone and soprano saxophones, backing vocals, percussion; Danny Federici – organ, piano, accordion, glockenspiel, backing vocals; Garry Tallent – bass, backing vocals, percussion; Max Weinberg – drums, backing vocals; Roy Bittan – piano, keyboards, backing vocals; Steven Van Zandt – guitar, mandolin, backing vocals	Darkness on the Edge of Town (1978); The River (1980); Electric Nebraska (Slated for 1982 but cancelled); Born in the U.S.A. (1984)
1983–84	Bruce Springsteen – lead and backing vocals, guitar, harmonica, piano; Clarence Clemons – tenor, baritone and soprano saxophones, backing vocals, percussion; Danny Federici – organ, piano, accordion, glockenspiel, backing vocals; Garry Tallent – bass, backing vocals, percussion; Max Weinberg – drums, backing vocals; Roy Bittan – piano, keyboards, backing vocals	
1984–1989	Bruce Springsteen – lead vocals, guitar, harmonica; Clarence Clemons – tenor and baritone saxophones, backing vocals, percussion; Danny Federici – organ, accordion, synthesizer, backing vocals; Garry Tallent – bass; Max Weinberg – drums, backing vocals; Roy Bittan – piano, synthesizer; Nils Lofgren – guitar, backing vocals; Patti Scialfa – vocals, synthesizer	Tunnel of Love (1987); Chimes of Freedom (1988)
band inactive 1989 to 1995		
1995–2001	Bruce Springsteen – lead and backing vocals, guitar, harmonica, piano, synthesizer, glockenspiel; Clarence Clemons – tenor and baritone saxophones, pennywhistle, backing vocals, percussion; Danny Federici – organ, accordion, keyboards, backing vocals; Garry Tallent – bass, backing vocals; Roy Bittan – piano, keyboards, backing vocals; Max Weinberg – drums, backing vocals; Nils Lofgren – guitar, pedal steel guitar, slide guitar, Dobro, banjo, backing vocals; Patti Scialfa – vocals, acoustic guitar; Steven Van Zandt – guitar, mandolin, backing vocals	Blood Brothers (1996)
2002–2008	Bruce Springsteen – lead and backing vocals, guitar, harmonica, piano, synthesizer, glockenspiel; Clarence Clemons – tenor and baritone saxophones, pennywhistle, backing vocals, percussion; Danny Federici – organ, accordion, keyboards, backing vocals; Garry Tallent – bass, backing vocals; Roy Bittan – piano, keyboards, backing vocals; Max Weinberg – drums, backing vocals; Nils Lofgren – guitar, pedal steel guitar, slide guitar, Dobro, banjo, backing vocals; Patti Scialfa – vocals, acoustic guitar; Steven Van Zandt – guitar, mandolin, backing vocals; Touring members: Soozie Tyrell – violin, backing vocals, percussion, acoustic guitar	The Rising (2002); Magic (2007); Working on a Dream (2009)
2008	Bruce Springsteen – lead vocals, guitar, harmonica, piano, synthesizer, glockenspiel; Clarence Clemons – tenor and baritone saxophones, pennywhistle, backing vocals, percussion; Danny Federici – organ, accordion, keyboards, backing vocals (one show only); Garry Tallent – bass; Roy Bittan – piano, keyboards, accordion, backing vocals; Max Weinberg – drums; Nils Lofgren – guitar, slide guitar, accordion, backing vocals; Patti Scialfa – vocals, acoustic guitar; Steven Van Zandt – guitar, mandolin, backing vocals; Touring members: Soozie Tyrell – violin, backing vocals, percussion, acoustic guitar; Charles Giordano – organ, accordion, synthesizer	
2009–2011	Bruce Springsteen – lead vocals, guitar, harmonica, piano, synthesizer, glockenspiel; Clarence Clemons – tenor and baritone saxophones, pennywhistle, backing vocals, percussion; Garry Tallent – bass; Roy Bittan – piano, keyboards, accordion, backing vocals; Max Weinberg – drums; Nils Lofgren – guitar, slide guitar, accordion, backing vocals; Patti Scialfa – vocals, acoustic guitar; Steven Van Zandt – guitar, mandolin, backing vocals; Touring members: Soozie Tyrell – violin, backing vocals, percussion, acoustic guitar; Charles Giordano – organ, accordion, synthesizer; with: Cindy Mizelle – vocals, percussion; Curtis King – vocals, percussion; Jay Weinberg – drums (substitute for his father during part of 2009 tour); Curt Ramm – trumpet (during final shows of 2009 tour)	
2012–2014	Bruce Springsteen – lead vocals, guitar, harmonica, piano, synthesizer, glockenspiel; Garry Tallent – bass; Roy Bittan – piano, keyboards, accordion, backing vocals; Max Weinberg – drums; Nils Lofgren – guitar, slide guitar, accordion, backing vocals; Patti Scialfa – vocals, acoustic guitar; Steven Van Zandt – guitar, mandolin, backing vocals; Touring members: Soozie Tyrell – violin, backing vocals, percussion, acoustic guitar; Charles Giordano – organ, accordion, synthesizer; with: Cindy Mizelle – vocals, percussion; Curtis King – vocals, percussion; Michelle Moore – vocals; Everett Bradley – percussion, vocals; Jake Clemons – tenor and baritone saxophone, percussion; Ed Manion – tenor and baritone saxophone, percussion; Curt Ramm – trumpet; Clark Gayton – trombone; Barry Danielian – trumpet; Tom Morello – guitar, vocals (filling in for Steve Van Zandt during the 2013 Australian leg, appeared on entire 2014 High Hopes Tour)	Wrecking Ball (2012); High Hopes (2014)
2015–2023	Bruce Springsteen – lead vocals, guitar, harmonica, piano, synthesizer, glockenspiel; Garry Tallent – bass, backing vocals; Roy Bittan – piano, keyboards, accordion, backing vocals; Max Weinberg – drums; Nils Lofgren – guitar, slide guitar, accordion, backing vocals; Patti Scialfa – vocals, acoustic guitar; Steven Van Zandt – guitar, mandolin, backing vocals; Soozie Tyrell – violin, backing vocals, percussion, acoustic guitar; Jake Clemons – tenor and baritone saxophone, percussion, backing vocals; Charles Giordano – organ, accordion, synthesizer	Letter to You (2020)
2023–present	Bruce Springsteen – lead vocals, guitar, harmonica, piano, synthesizer, glockenspiel; Garry Tallent – bass, backing vocals; Roy Bittan – piano, keyboards, accordion, backing vocals; Max Weinberg – drums; Nils Lofgren – guitar, slide guitar, accordion, backing vocals; Patti Scialfa – vocals, acoustic guitar; Steven Van Zandt – guitar, mandolin, backing vocals; Soozie Tyrell – violin, backing vocals, percussion, acoustic guitar; Jake Clemons – tenor and baritone saxophone, percussion, backing vocals; Charles Giordano – organ, accordion, synthesizer; and the E Street Horns and the E Street Choir: Anthony Almonte – percussion, vocals; Ed Manion – tenor and baritone saxophone, percussion; Curt Ramm – trumpet; Barry Danielian – trumpet; Ozzie Melendez – trombone; Curtis King – vocals, percussion; Michelle Moore – vocals; Lisa Lowell – vocals; Ada Dyer – vocals	

== Discography ==
=== Albums and singles featuring the E Street Band ===
- Bruce Springsteen & the E Street Band
  - Live/1975–85 (1986)
  - Live in New York City (2001)
  - Hammersmith Odeon London '75 (2006)
  - Magic Tour Highlights (2008)
  - Bruce Springsteen & The E Street Band Greatest Hits (2009)
  - Live from the Carousel (2011)
  - The Live Series: Songs of the Road (2018)
  - The Live Series: Songs of Friendship (2019)
  - The Live Series: Songs of Hope (2019)
- Bruce Springsteen
  - Greetings from Asbury Park, N.J. (1973)
  - The Wild, the Innocent & the E Street Shuffle (1973)
  - Born to Run (1975)
  - Darkness on the Edge of Town (1978)
  - The River (1980)
  - Electric Nebraska (Slated for 1982 but cancelled)
  - Born in the U.S.A. (1984)
  - The Born in the U.S.A. 12" Single Collection (1985)
  - Tunnel of Love (1987)
  - Chimes of Freedom (1988)
  - Greatest Hits (1995)
  - Blood Brothers (1996)
  - Tracks (1998)
  - 18 Tracks (1999)
  - The Rising (2002)
  - The Essential Bruce Springsteen (2003)
  - Born to Run: 30th Anniversary Edition (2005)
  - Magic (2007)
  - Working on a Dream (2009)
  - The Collection 1973–1984 (2010)
  - The Promise (2010)
  - The Promise: The Darkness on the Edge of Town Story (2010)
  - Wrecking Ball (2012)
  - Collection: 1973–2012 (2013)
  - The Album Collection Vol. 1 1973–1984 (2014)
  - High Hopes (2014)
  - American Beauty (2014)
  - The Ties That Bind: The River Collection (2015)
  - Chapter and Verse (2016)
  - Letter to You (2020)
- Ronnie Spector & the E Street Band
  - "Say Goodbye to Hollywood" / "Baby Please Don't Go" (1977)
- Gary U.S. Bonds
  - Dedication (1981)
  - On the Line (1982)
- Other albums/singles
  - Musicians United for Safe Energy: No Nukes (1979)
  - Various artists: In Harmony 2 (1981)
  - USA for Africa: We Are the World (1985)
  - Various artists: A Very Special Christmas (1987)
  - Various artists: Folkways - A Vision Shared (1988)
  - Darlene Love: "All Alone On Christmas" (1992)
  - Various artists: The Concert for the Rock & Roll Hall of Fame (1996)
  - Various artists: Enjoy Every Sandwich: The Songs of Warren Zevon (2004)

=== Albums and singles featuring two or more individual band members only ===
- Bruce Springsteen – Part 2

These albums are notable for not using the E Street Band; however, a few members of the band appeared on each of them, including singer Patti Scialfa who appeared on all of them.

  - Human Touch (1992) (Bittan, Scialfa, former-member Sancious)
  - Lucky Town (1992) (Bittan, Scialfa, member-to-be Tyrell)
  - In Concert/MTV Plugged (1992) (Bittan, Scialfa)
  - The Ghost of Tom Joad (1995) (Federici, Tallent, Scialfa, member-to-be Tyrell)
  - Devils & Dust (2005) (Federici, Scialfa, and Tyrell)
  - We Shall Overcome: The Seeger Sessions (2006) (Scialfa, Tyrell, member-to-be Giordano)
  - Wrecking Ball (2012) (Clemons, Scialfa, Van Zandt, Weinberg, and Tyrell and Giordano)
- Little Steven
  - Men Without Women (1982) (Van Zandt, Clemons, Federici, Tallent, Springsteen, Weinberg, Manion)
  - Freedom - No Compromise (1987) (Van Zandt, Springsteen)
  - Soulfire (2017) (Van Zandt, Manion, Mizelle, Springsteen)
  - Soulfire Live! (2018) (Van Zandt, Bradley, Manion, Springsteen)
- Meat Loaf
  - Bat Out of Hell (1977) (Bittan and Weinberg)
  - Dead Ringer (1981) (Bittan and Weinberg)
- Southside Johnny and The Asbury Jukes
  - This Time It's for Real (1977) (Manion, Van Zandt, Springsteen, Carter)
  - Hearts of Stone (1978) (Weinberg, Van Zandt, Miami Horns, Springsteen)
  - Reach Up and Touch the Sky (1981) (Springsteen, Van Zandt, Manion, Scialfa)
  - Better Days (1991) (Van Zandt, Manion, Springsteen, Tallent, Weinberg)
- Bonnie Tyler
  - Faster Than the Speed of Night (1983) (Bittan and Weinberg)
  - Secret Dreams and Forbidden Fire (1986) (Bittan, Weinberg, King, Mizelle)
- Patti Scialfa
  - Rumble Doll (1993) (Scialfa, Lofgren, Springsteen, Tyrell)
  - 23rd Street Lullaby (2004) (Scialfa, Lofgren, Springsteen, Tyrell, Moore)
  - Play It as It Lays (2007) (Scialfa, King, Lofgren, Mizelle, Moore, Springsteen, Tyrell)
- Clarence Clemons
  - Rescue (1983) (Clemons, Springsteen)
  - Hero (1985) (Clemons, Sancious)
  - Live in Asbury Park, Vol. 2 (2004) (Clemons, Springsteen)
- Other artists
  - Ian Hunter: You're Never Alone with a Schizophrenic (1979) (Bittan, Weinberg, Tallent)
  - Garland Jeffreys: Escape Artist (1980) (Bittan, Federici)
  - Jim Steinman: Bad for Good (1981) (Bittan, Weinberg)
  - Artists United Against Apartheid: Sun City (1985) (Van Zandt, Springsteen, Clemons)
  - John Eddie: John Eddie (1986) (Lofgren, Weinberg)
  - Jersey Artists For Mankind: "We Got the Love" / "Save Love, Save Life" (1986) (Weinberg, Springsteen, Clemons, Tallent, Manion, Carter)
  - Ringo Starr: Ringo Starr and His All-Starr Band (1990) (Lofgren, Clemons)
  - Nils Lofgren: Silver Lining (1990) (Lofgren, Clemons, Springsteen)
  - Killer Joe: Scene of the Crime (1991) (Van Zandt, Springsteen, Weinberg)
  - Bob Dylan: The Bootleg Series Volumes 1–3 (Rare & Unreleased) 1961–1991 (1991) (Bittan, Van Zandt)
  - Soozie Tyrell: White Lines (2003) (Tyrell, Springsteen, Scialfa)
  - Darlene Love: Introducing Darlene Love (2015) (Jake Clemons, Springsteen, Van Zandt, Manion, Ramm)
  - Marcos Cabanas: Racing With Rosie (2025) (Danielian, Melendez, Tallent)
