= The Born in the U.S.A. 12″ Single Collection =

The Born in the U.S.A. 12" Single Collection

Box set by Bruce Springsteen and the E Street Band
- Released: 1985
- Genre: Pop/rock
- Length: 73:38
- Label: CBS
- Producers: Bruce Springsteen; Chuck Plotkin; Jon Landau; Steven Van Zandt; Arthur Baker; Jim Cretecos; Mike Appel

Bruce Springsteen and the E Street Band chronology
The Born in the U.S.A. 12" Single Collection (1985)	The Collection (2004)

The Born in the U.S.A. 12" Single Collection is a box set of 12" singles from the album Born in the U.S.A. by rock artist Bruce Springsteen. It was released in the UK in 1985 courtesy of CBS Records to help promote the Born in the U.S.A. album. It originally came with a poster of Springsteen and a bonus 7" single previously unreleased in the UK. It contains all the singles from Born in the U.S.A. except for "My Hometown" and "Born in the U.S.A." (However "Born in the U.S.A. the Freedom Mix" appeared as one of the b-sides to "I'm on Fire".) All songs written by Springsteen and mixed by Bob Clearmountain except where noted.

== Track listings ==
=== Dancing in the Dark ===
==== Side A ====
1. Dancing in the Dark (Extended Remix) 6:00
- Produced by Bruce Springsteen, Chuck Plotkin, Jon Landau, and Steven Van Zandt
- Recorded by Toby Scott

==== Side B ====
1. Pink Cadillac 3:33
- Produced by Bruce Springsteen, Chuck Plotkin, Jon Landau, and Steven Van Zandt
- Recorded by Toby Scott

=== Cover Me ===
==== Side A ====
1. Cover Me (Undercover Mix) 6:05
2. Cover Me (Dub) 4:02
3. Shut Out the Light 3:52

===== Cover Me Undercover Mix and Dub =====
- 12" remix engineered by Toby Scott
- Produced by Bruce Springsteen, Chuck Plotkin, Jon Landau, and Steven Van Zandt
- Additional 12" remix producer - Arthur Baker
- Remixed at The Hit Factory
- Recorded by Bill Scheniman

===== Shut Out the Light =====
- Produced by Bruce Springsteen, Chuck Plotkin, Jon Landau, and Steven Van Zandt

==== Side B ====
1. Dancing in the Dark (Dub) 4:57
2. Jersey Girl (Live 7/9/81) 5:50

===== Dancing in the Dark (Dub) =====
- Remix Engineer - Chris Lord-Alge
- Produced by Bruce Springsteen, Chuck Plotkin, Jon Landau, and Steven Van Zandt
- Additional remix producer - Arthur Baker

===== Jersey Girl (Live 7/9/81) =====
- Produced by Bruce Springsteen, Chuck Plotkin, Jon Landau, and Steven Van Zandt
- Written by Tom Waits
- Recorded live at The Meadowlands July 9, 1981.

=== I'm on Fire ===
==== Side A ====
1. I'm on Fire 2:36
2. Rosalita (Come out Tonight) 7:02

===== I'm on Fire =====
- Produced by Bruce Springsteen, Chuck Plotkin, Jon Landau, and Steven Van Zandt
- Recorded by Toby Scott

===== Rosalita (Come out Tonight) =====
- Produced by Jim Cretecos and Mike Appel
- Originally released on the album The Wild, The Innocent and the E Street Shuffle

==== Side B ====
1. Born in the U.S.A. (The Freedom Mix) 7:20
2. Johnny Bye Bye 1:20

===== Born in the U.S.A. (The Freedom Mix) =====
- 12" remix engineer - Toby Scott
- Produced by Bruce Springsteen, Chuck Plotkin, Jon Landau, and Steven Van Zandt
- Additional 12" remix producer - Arthur Baker for Arthur Baker, Inc.

===== Johnny Bye Bye =====
- Produced by Bruce Springsteen, Chuck Plotkin, and Jon Landau
- Recorded by Toby Scott
- Written by Bruce Springsteen and Chuck Berry

=== Glory Days ===
==== Side A ====
1. Glory Days 4:15
2. Stand on It 2:30

===== Glory Days =====
- Produced by Bruce Springsteen, Chuck Plotkin, Jon Landau, and Steven Van Zandt
- Recorded by Toby Scott

===== Stand on It =====
- Produced by Bruce Springsteen, Chuck Plotkin, and Jon Landau
- Recorded and mixed by Toby Scott

==== Side B ====
1. Sherry Darling 4:02
2. Racing in the Street 6:52

===== Sherry Darling =====
- Produced by Bruce Springsteen, Jon Landau, and Steven Van Zandt
- Originally released on the album The River

===== Racing in the Street =====
- Originally released on the album Darkness on the Edge of Town

=== Bonus 7" Single: I'm Goin' Down ===
==== Side A ====
1. I'm Goin' Down 3:29
- Produced by Bruce Springsteen, Chuck Plotkin, Jon Landau, and Steven Van Zandt
- Recorded by Toby Scott

==== Side B ====
1. Janey, Don't You Lose Heart 3:23
- Produced by Bruce Springsteen, Chuck Plotkin, and Jon Landau
- Recorded by Toby Scott

== Review ==
Professional ratings
Review scores
Source	Rating
Allmusic	4.5/5 stars

The Born in the U.S.A. 12" Single Collection retrospectively received four and a half stars out of five from William Ruhlmann of Allmusic. He said that "The remixes were trendy at the time -- even Bob Dylan employed remixer Arthur Baker (who also served here) in the mid '80s -- though they now sound like curiosities. But the B-sides are nearly the equal of some of the released tracks on Born in the U.S.A., and the addition of songs like "Rosalita" make this box a comprehensive sampler of Springsteen's work up to 1985. The only problem is that you have to keep getting up and changing the records."
