= Meadowlands July 25, 1992 =

Live album by Bruce Springsteen
- Released: May 3, 2019
- Recorded: July 25, 1992
- Venue: Meadowlands Arena

Meadowlands July 25, 1992 is a live concert album by American singer-songwriter Bruce Springsteen recorded at Meadowlands Arena in East Rutherford, New Jersey, as part of the artist's 1992–93 World Tour. The album was released on May 3, 2019, as part of the Bruce Springsteen Archives.

== Track listing ==
No.	Title	Length
1.	"Better Days"	4:47
2.	"Local Hero"	6:08
3.	"Lucky Town"	4:35
4.	"Darkness on the Edge of Town"	5:57
5.	"Open All Night"	8:08
6.	"If I Should Fall Behind"	4:43
7.	"57 Channels (And Nothin' On)"	6:30
8.	"Badlands"	5:30
9.	"The River"	6:17
10.	"Living Proof"	8:43
11.	"My Hometown"	7:38
12.	"Leap of Faith"	4:28
13.	"Man's Job"	6:40
14.	"Roll of the Dice"	12:55
15.	"All or Nothin' At All"	6:28
16.	"Ninety-Nine and a Half (Won't Do)"	6:48
17.	"Real Man"	5:26
18.	"Cover Me"	6:25
19.	"Brilliant Disguise"	4:52
20.	"Tougher Than the Rest"	6:01
21.	"Souls of the Departed"	6:46
22.	"Born in the U.S.A."	5:21
23.	"Light of Day"	13:03
24.	"Glory Days"	13:40
25.	"Working on the Highway"	4:07
26.	"Bobby Jean"	3:51
27.	"Hungry Heart"	8:11
28.	"Thunder Road"	6:03
29.	"Born to Run"	5:32
30.	"My Beautiful Reward"	6:16
