= Farewell Song (Janis Joplin) =

Compilation album by Janis Joplin
- Released: February 1982
- Recorded: January 31, 1967 – June 28, 1970
- Genre: Rock and roll, soul
- Length: 32:56
- Label: Columbia

Janis Joplin chronology
Janis (1975)	Farewell Song (1982)	Janis (1993)

Professional ratings
Review scores
Source	Rating
Rolling Stone	3.5/5 stars
Robert Christgau	B−

Farewell Song is a 1982 collection of nine previously unreleased recordings of Janis Joplin with Big Brother and the Holding Company, the Kozmic Blues Band, and Full Tilt Boogie Band. Tracks include Cheap Thrills-era outtakes and live performances; "Misery 'N", "Farewell Song", and "Catch Me Daddy".

== Production ==
The recordings were enhanced through the use of devices such as the Lexicon 224 and the ADR Scamp Rack by producer Elliot Mazer, and the original bass by Peter Albin on "Farewell Song" was replaced with bass work by Mazer. Some members of Big Brother and the Holding Company were unhappy about some of these changes. The original versions can be found on the subsequent compilation Janis.

One Night Stand was produced by Todd Rundgren and performed with the Paul Butterfield Blues Band and became a minor hit upon release. Tell Mama is the only Full Tilt Boogie Band track.

== Track listing ==
1. "Tell Mama" (Live) (Marcus Daniel, Wilbur Terrell, Clarence Carter) – 5:46
2. "Magic of Love" (Live) (Mark Spoelstra) – 3:02
3. "Misery'N" (Peter Albin, James Gurley, Sam Andrew, David Getz, Janis Joplin) – 4:13
4. "One Night Stand" (Steve Gordon, Barry Flast) – 3:07
5. "Harry" (Peter Albin, James Gurley, Sam Andrew, David Getz, Janis Joplin) – 0:57
6. "Raise Your Hand" (Live) (Steve Cropper, Eddie Floyd, Alvertis Isbell) – 3:44
7. "Farewell Song" (Live) (Sam Andrew) – 4:36
8. "Medley: Amazing Grace/Hi-Heel Sneakers" (Live) – 2:35
9. "Catch Me Daddy" (Peter Albin, James Gurley, Sam Andrew, David Getz, Janis Joplin) – 4:50

== Personnel ==
- Janis Joplin – vocals
- Terry Clements – tenor saxophone
- Richard Kermode – organ
- Brad Campbell – bass
- Clark Pierson – drums
- Ken Pearson – organ
- Cornelius "Snookey" Flowers – baritone saxophone
- Richard Bell – piano
- David Getz – drums
- John Till – guitar
- Roy Markowitz – drums
- Sam Andrew – guitar
- Luis Gasca – trumpet
- Peter Albin – bass
- James Gurley – guitar
