= Janis (1993 album) =

Compilation album by Janis Joplin
- Released: November 23, 1993
- Recorded: December 1962 – September 26, 1970
- Genre: Blues rock, psychedelic rock, soul, blues
- Length: 195:50
- Label: Columbia Legacy

Janis Joplin chronology
Farewell Song (1982)	Janis (1993)	This Is Janis Joplin (1995)

Janis is a compilation album by Janis Joplin, released in 1993. The album features a broad overview of her career from her first recording in December 1962 to the last songs that she recorded during the sessions for Pearl just a few days before her death in October 1970.

== Critical reception ==
Professional ratings
Review scores
Source	Rating
AllMusic	4.5/5 stars
Entertainment Weekly	A+
Rolling Stone	4/5 stars
The Rolling Stone Album Guide	4.5/5 stars
The Village Voice	A

Janis was voted the seventh-best reissue of 1993 in The Village Voice's annual Pazz & Jop critics poll. Robert Christgau, the poll's supervisor, called the album "a smart, audiowise set that not only gets Joplin's achievement right but helps us understand it".

== Track listing ==
=== Disc one ===
1. "What Good Can Drinkin' Do" – 2:45 (recorded in 1962, previously unreleased; a different version was released on the 1975 Janis album)
2. "Trouble in Mind" – 3:03 (recorded in 1965, previously unreleased; a different version was released on the 1975 Janis album)
3. "Hesitation Blues" – 4:05 (recorded in 1965, previously unreleased)
4. "Easy Rider" – 2:24 (Big Brother & the Holding Company, 1967)
5. "Coo Coo" – 2:05 (Big Brother & the Holding Company, 1967)
6. "Down on Me" – 2:06 (Big Brother & the Holding Company, 1967)
7. "The Last Time" – 2:17 (Big Brother & the Holding Company, 1967)
8. "All Is Loneliness" – 2:19 (Big Brother & the Holding Company, 1967)
9. "Call on Me" – 3:37 (live, recorded in 1967, previously unreleased, original version released on Big Brother & the Holding Company)
10. "Women Is Losers" – 5:08 (live, recorded in 1967, previously unreleased, original version released on Big Brother & the Holding Company)
11. "Intruder" – 2:32 (Big Brother & the Holding Company, 1967)
12. "Light Is Faster than Sound" – 2:32 (Big Brother & the Holding Company, 1967)
13. "Bye, Bye Baby" – 2:39 (Big Brother & the Holding Company, 1967)
14. "Farewell Song" – 4:24 (previously unreleased, from the Cheap Thrills sessions)
15. "Flower in the Sun" – 3:13 (In Concert, 1972)
16. "Misery'n" – 4:09 (previously unissued alternate take, from the Cheap Thrills sessions)
17. "Road Block" – 6:12 (live, previously unreleased, from the Monterey Pop Festival, 1967)
18. "Ball and Chain" – 8:07 (live, previously unreleased, from the Monterey Pop Festival, 1967)

=== Disc two ===
1. "Combination of the Two" – 5:52 (Cheap Thrills, 1968)
2. "I Need a Man to Love" – 4:53 (Cheap Thrills, 1968)
3. "Piece of My Heart" – 4:28 (Cheap Thrills, 1968)
4. "Turtle Blues" – 4:30 (Cheap Thrills, 1968)
5. "Oh, Sweet Mary" – 4:16 (Cheap Thrills, 1968)
6. "Catch Me Daddy" – 4:56 (previously unreleased, from the Cheap Thrills sessions)
7. "Summertime" – 4:07 (previously unreleased alternate take, from the Cheap Thrills sessions)
8. "Kozmic Blues" – 4:24 (I Got Dem Ol' Kozmic Blues Again Mama!, 1969)
9. "Try (Just a Little Bit Harder)" – 3:58 (I Got Dem Ol' Kozmic Blues Again Mama!, 1969)
10. "One Good Man" – 4:11 (I Got Dem Ol' Kozmic Blues Again Mama!, 1969)
11. "Dear Landlord" – 2:33 (previously unreleased, from the I Got Dem Ol' Kozmic Blues Again Mama! sessions)
12. "To Love Somebody" – 5:19 (I Got Dem Ol' Kozmic Blues Again Mama!, 1969)
13. "As Good as You've Been to This World" – 5:27 (I Got Dem Ol' Kozmic Blues Again Mama!, 1969)
14. "Little Girl Blue" – 3:51 (I Got Dem Ol' Kozmic Blues Again Mama!, 1969)
15. "Work Me, Lord" – 6:38 (I Got Dem Ol' Kozmic Blues Again Mama!, 1969)
16. "Raise Your Hand" – 2:17 (live, from The Ed Sullivan Show, 1969)
17. "Maybe" – 4:07 (live, from The Ed Sullivan Show, 1969)

=== Disc three ===
1. "Me and Bobby McGee" – 4:49 (alternate version)
2. "One Night Stand" – 3:10 (alternate take)
3. "Tell Mama" – 5:48 (live, from Farewell Song, 1982)
4. "Try (Just a Little Bit Harder)" – 8:16 (live, from In Concert, 1972)
5. "Cry Baby" – 4:59 (previously unreleased, from the Pearl sessions)
6. "Move Over" – 3:42 (Pearl, 1970)
7. "A Woman Left Lonely" – 3:29 (Pearl, 1970)
8. "Half Moon" – 3:53 (Pearl, 1970)
9. "Happy Birthday, John (Happy Trails)" – 1:10 (previously unreleased, recorded for John Lennon)
10. "My Baby" – 3:45 (Pearl, 1970)
11. "Mercedes Benz" – 2:14 (Pearl, 1970, includes a previously unreleased longer spoken intro)
12. "Trust Me" – 3:17 (Pearl, 1970)
13. "Get It While You Can" – 3:25 (Pearl, 1970)
14. "Me and Bobby McGee" – 4:29 (Pearl, 1970)

== Certifications ==
Region	Certification	Certified units/sales
United States (RIAA)	Gold	500,000^{^}
^{^} Shipments figures based on certification alone.
