= Working on a Dream Tour =

2009 concert tour by Bruce Springsteen and the E Street Band

- Tour by Bruce Springsteen and the E Street Band
- Location: North America; Western Europe
- Associated album: Working on a Dream
- Start date: April 1, 2009
- End date: November 22, 2009
- Legs: 3
- No. of shows: 83
- Box office: $167 million ($250.62 in 2025 dollars)

Bruce Springsteen and the E Street Band concert chronology
- Magic Tour (2007–08); Working on a Dream Tour (2009); Wrecking Ball Tour (2012–13)

The Working on a Dream Tour was a concert tour by Bruce Springsteen and the E Street Band, which began in April 2009 and ended in November 2009. It followed the late January 2009 release of the album Working on a Dream. This was the first full E Street Band tour without founding member Danny Federici, who died during the previous tour in 2008, and the final tour for founding member Clarence Clemons, who died in 2011.

The tour was shorter than a typical Springsteen outing, but for the first time in his career, it placed an emphasis on performing at music festivals, especially in Europe. Even more unlike all his previous tours, the Working on a Dream Tour featured little of his new album. Instead, several trends from the latter stages of the previous year's Magic Tour were carried forward: a focus on topical content, this time the late-2000s recession; a repetition of some of the stage raps and antics; and most visibly, continuation of a 'signs' segment, in which audience members would hold up signs requesting rare Springsteen songs or decades-past oldies and the band would stage (sometimes impromptu) performances of them. The final leg of the tour often featured another first as Springsteen played one of his classic 1970s or 1980s albums all the way through. Critical reaction to the tour's shows was generally positive, although the absence of the new material was noted.

Max Weinberg was not available for parts of the tour due to his bandleader obligations to The Tonight Show with Conan O'Brien, which was just commencing. His 18-year-old son, Jay Weinberg, became his replacement for parts or all of a number of shows, to a mostly positive reception from the rest of the band, the audience, and critics. The tour also gave Springsteen a chance to bid farewell to two famous venues he had played many shows at – the Philadelphia Spectrum and New Jersey's Giants Stadium.

The tour was a commercial success, grossing over $167 million, being seen by over 1.9 million ticket holders, and finishing as the third-highest-grossing tour in the world for 2009 even though the tour faced some logistical issues. Ticket sales were botched by Ticketmaster, a situation further exacerbated by revelations of their holding seats back for their secondary market TicketsNow. Before long, legislatures and attorneys general of several states, as well as members of the U.S. Congress and federal regulatory agencies, were weighing in on the matter, with various lawsuits, settlements, and proposed laws as the result.

== Itinerary ==
The tour was envisioned by the Springsteen camp as not being "a total marathon", and was thus considerably shorter than usual for Springsteen, especially in North America, where only 26 stops were planned. It did include a date in Oklahoma, where Springsteen had not played in three decades and where officials at Tulsa's BOK Center had been trying to lure Springsteen for years.

On February 23, 2009, it was confirmed that Springsteen would be headlining the Saturday night at Glastonbury festival in June of the same year. Springsteen also signed up for the Pinkpop Festival in the Netherlands and the Bonnaroo Music Festival in the United States; playing such festivals was a departure from his normal routing, and challenged him with audiences that were not pre-selected with his fans.

One continuing subplot with the tour's scheduling was E Street drummer Max Weinberg's availability vis à vis his job as The Max Weinberg 7 bandleader for Conan O'Brien, given that during the first half of 2009 Late Night with Conan O'Brien in New York City was ending and The Tonight Show with Conan O'Brien in Los Angeles was beginning. The mid-January announcement that Late Night would continue until February 20 precluded any notion of starting the tour immediately following Springsteen's appearance at Super Bowl XLIII, in addition to the band feeling that they had just gotten off the Magic Tour and "Wait, let's stop a minute." Meanwhile, the June 1 start date of The Tonight Show posed problems for Weinberg's continued presence on the tour. O'Brien told a Variety reporter at the time of the announcement that he hoped that Weinberg would follow him to Los Angeles and that he also hoped an arrangement could be worked out to let Weinberg go on the road with Springsteen as had been done for past tours. At NBC, the coexistence between the drummer's two bosses was known as the Weinberg-Springsteen Rule, and was not typically extended to other talent at the network. In a high-profile Rolling Stone cover story interview, Springsteen was vague about the matter: "All I know is this – it's all gonna work out, one way or another. If people wanna come out and see the E Street Band, they'll be able to come out and see the E Street Band." And whether Weinberg would stay with O'Brien and move or not was a subject of conflicting news reports until O'Brien confirmed on February 18 that Weinberg and the band were indeed coming with him. A few days later, E Streeter Steven Van Zandt said of Weinberg's availability for the post-June 1, European leg: "We’re still figuring that out. We’ll see. I think Max will be there for most of it. ... I know he was very much trying to figure it out." Weinberg had not missed an E Street Band show since joining the outfit in 1974, and Van Zandt said that no amount of rehearsal by another drummer could replace Weinberg's intuitive understanding of Springsteen's performance gambits.

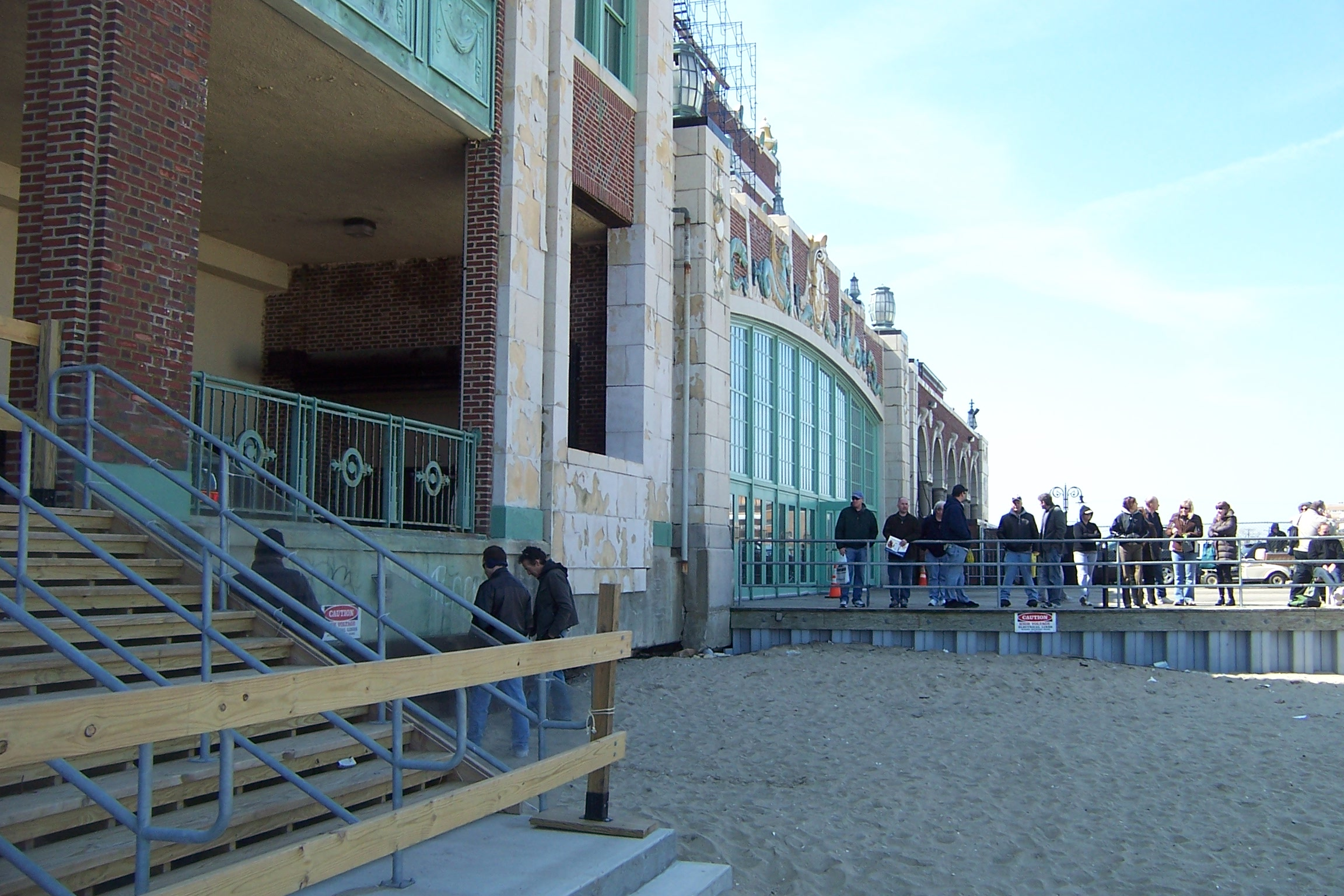
Fans listening outside Asbury Park Convention Hall as Springsteen and the E Street Band work on arrangements for "Outlaw Pete" in rehearsal. March 18, 2009.

As had been the practice since the Reunion Tour in 1999, Springsteen and the band began rehearsals at Asbury Park Convention Hall. Beginning on March 11, some of the Springsteen faithful listened outside closed doors for what songs and arrangements the tour might bring. The presence of Max Weinberg's 18-year-old son Jay, a freshman at Stevens Institute of Technology and also a drummer, at rehearsals indicated that he might be the one to replace his father for European leg shows where Tonight Show duties came into play. On one occasion on the Magic Tour, Jay Weinberg had sat in on drums for "Born to Run". This was confirmed by Springsteen on March 20, who said that Jay Weinberg would be drumming at a small number of shows during the tour. Springsteen added, "Once again, I want to express my appreciation to Conan O'Brien, and everyone on his team, for making it possible for Max to continue to do double duty for both us and for him. We promise to return him in one piece." Van Zandt said, "I’ve been avoiding this question for weeks! Thank God they finally announced it. We already did three days of rehearsals. Jay's a fantastic drummer. It's in the Weinberg DNA."

By the time the American first leg was well underway, there was speculation of more American dates to come in the late summer and fall, but E Street guitarist Nils Lofgren said that Springsteen and wife Patti Scialfa would make a decision later on.

Advertising for the just-announced Giants Stadium shows as fans leave the Meadowlands Arena after the May 21, 2009, show.

On May 21, 2009, while playing at the Izod Center, Springsteen announced he would be playing three dates at next-door Giants Stadium in late September and early October, saying the band would "say goodbye to old Giants Stadium ... Before they bring the wrecking ball, the wrecking crew is coming back!" The video screens on stage showed a huge banner being hung on the stadium, which was the forerunner of heavy advertising for the shows on local television. They sold out quickly, and two more dates were added, finishing on October 9. These were scheduled to be the last concerts ever at the stadium. The final show sold out quickly but not the one before it. Subsequent U.S. tour dates in the late summer began to be announced as well, focusing on outdoor amphitheaters in the Northeast. In mid-July, a further extension to the U.S. tour was announced, adding shows in indoor arenas through November.

The November 22, 2009, performance in Buffalo, New York, was slated as the tour's last. After that, the E Street Band was expected to take a one to two-year hiatus, while Springsteen worked on another project.

The October 26, 2009, show in Kansas City, Missouri, was canceled an hour before its scheduled start time due to the death of Lenny Sullivan, Springsteen's cousin and assistant road manager for ten years. It was not rescheduled.

== Ticket sales ==
Even before any official tour announcement, tickets went on sale in Norway and Sweden. The heavy demand caused a crash in the Scandinavian ticketing system. A similar situation due to heavy demand occurred in Finland with the Lippupiste ticketing system.

On January 27, 2009, the day of the Working on a Dream release in the United States, the official announcement of the tour came.

On February 1, 2009, Springsteen & the E Street Band performed at halftime of Super Bowl XLIII. The following day, February 2, 2009, tickets for many of the U.S. shows went on sale. Despite the Great Recession, demand was heavy in a number of areas, both due to Springsteen's continued popularity and the high visibility from the Super Bowl appearance. Other areas failed to show the ticket fervor of past outings. The pair of shows in both New Jersey and Philadelphia sold out in about an hour. East Coast online sales through Ticketmaster, including the New Jersey ones, were especially troublesome, as many customers endured long waits or were in the middle of a purchasing transaction, only to be hit with screens saying the site was down "due to routine maintenance". Ticketmaster acknowledged that the technical problem with the sales "wasn't our finest hour." Tickets for the New Jersey shows were in limited supply to begin with, as some 27 percent of them were held back from sale by the venue, the record company, Springsteen's organization, and others. Indeed, for one of the shows Springsteen's management held back all but 108 of the 1,126 seats in the four sections nearest the stage.

Frustration became a public outcry when many of Ticketmaster online customers, upon being informed shows were sold out, were directed to TicketsNow, a Ticketmaster-owned site, where tickets were sold on the secondary market at extremely inflated prices. Ticketmaster even pushed fans to TicketsNow even when there were still tickets available for a given show. Bill Pascrell, the member of the U.S. House of Representatives from New Jersey's 8th congressional district, asked the Federal Trade Commission and the U.S. Department of Justice to investigate the relationship between Ticketmaster and TicketsNow, saying, "I am concerned that the business affiliation between Ticketmaster and TicketsNow may represent a conflict of interest that is detrimental to the average fan. There is a significant potential for abuse when one company is able to monopolize the primary market for a product and also directly manipulate, and profit from, the secondary market."

Springsteen issued a statement on his website where he chastised Ticketmaster and made it clear that he had no affiliation with them (the venues had the affiliation). Springsteen's organization, as well as record companies and promoters, held back substantial numbers of tickets from public sales and made their supply even tighter, especially for New Jersey shows. On the same day that New Jersey State Assemblymen Gary Schaer and Wayne DeAngelo called for an inquiry, New Jersey Attorney General Anne Milgram also said that her office and the New Jersey Division of Consumer Affairs would investigate the sale of Springsteen concert tickets amidst a number of complaints. As the matter gained national attention, it became what The Washington Post described as a "public relations nightmare" for Ticketmaster. On February 5, Ticketmaster issued an "open letter of apology" to Springsteen and his fans, saying that it would no longer link to TicketsNow from Ticketmaster during high-demand sales and promising it would refund customers who inadvertently bought secondary market tickets. Pascrell, whose office received over 1,000 complaints on the matter, and Connecticut Attorney General Richard Blumenthal also used the sales tales to indicate concern with the possible merger of Ticketmaster with Live Nation. Springsteen also voiced his objection to the merger, and his comments also gained national attention.

On February 23, 2009, Ticketmaster agreed to an out-of-court settlement with the New Jersey Attorney General. Ticketmaster agreed to refund payments made to TicketsNow and reduce its visibility, and made some 2,000 tickets to the New Jersey shows available to complaints via random lottery, with promises of additional reparations if Springsteen scheduled a third leg to return to the United States in the summer. The company was not fined, but did reimburse the Attorney General's office $350,000 for investigatory expenses. Over 1,800 people qualified for the March 31 lottery, and those that got them eventually picked up their tickets at an amusingly named "Attorney General Will Call Line" before the shows. In March 2009, Springsteen manager Jon Landau emphasized that Springsteen never directly releases tickets into the secondary market, in the wake of revelations about other artists doing so. In May 2009 – and on the same day that Springsteen would perform at the local Xcel Energy Center – Governor of Minnesota Tim Pawlenty signed into law "the Bruce Springsteen bill", which forbade online ticket sellers from sending frustrated customers to resale sites that offer inflated-price secondary market tickets.

Different but similar Ticketmaster drama occurred on March 20 when tickets went on sale for Springsteen's two Asbury Park Convention Hall rehearsal shows a few days hence. Dozens of fans said that the Ticketmaster automated lines gave messages that no shows were on sale, while those using the human operator lines were able to make purchases. Ticketmaster denied that anything had gone wrong.

The secondary markets ticket saga re-emerged in mid-May during the first leg of the tour when TicketsNow announced they had oversold by some 300 persons the date at Washington, D.C.'s Verizon Center. TicketsNow offered double refunds and inferiorly located tickets to other Springsteen shows, but Springsteen manager Landau was quite unhappy: "We would like our audience to know that this is a problem caused entirely by Ticketmaster and its wholly owned subsidiary TicketsNow. Neither Bruce nor his management have any control whatsoever over these two troubled entities but we deeply resent the abuse of our fans."

When Springsteen's autumn Giants Stadium shows were announced in late May 2009, secondary market sellers began advertising steeply marked-up tickets before they went on sale. This caused Attorney General Milgram to file suit against three such sellers for fraudulent behavior, especially given that some of the advertised seat locations did not even exist. On June 1, Congressman Pascrell announced proposed federal legislation, titled the "BOSS ACT" (Better Oversight of Secondary Sales and Accountability in Concert Ticketing), which would require primary ticket sellers to disclose how many tickets were being held back from sale, prohibit ticket brokers from buying tickets during the first 48 hours on sale, and prohibit primary ticket sellers, promoters, and artists from entering the secondary market.

In February 2010, Ticketmaster reached a settlement with the Federal Trade Commission, which denounced the company's "deceptive bait-and-switch tactics" regarding phantom tickets, and made reference to an example in which the same 38 tickets to a tour show in Washington were sold and resold 1,600 times. Ticketmaster conceded no wrongdoing but agreed to stop the practice; they also agreed to $1 million in refunds for overcharges for secondary market sales via TicketsNow.

== The show ==
=== Planning and rehearsals ===
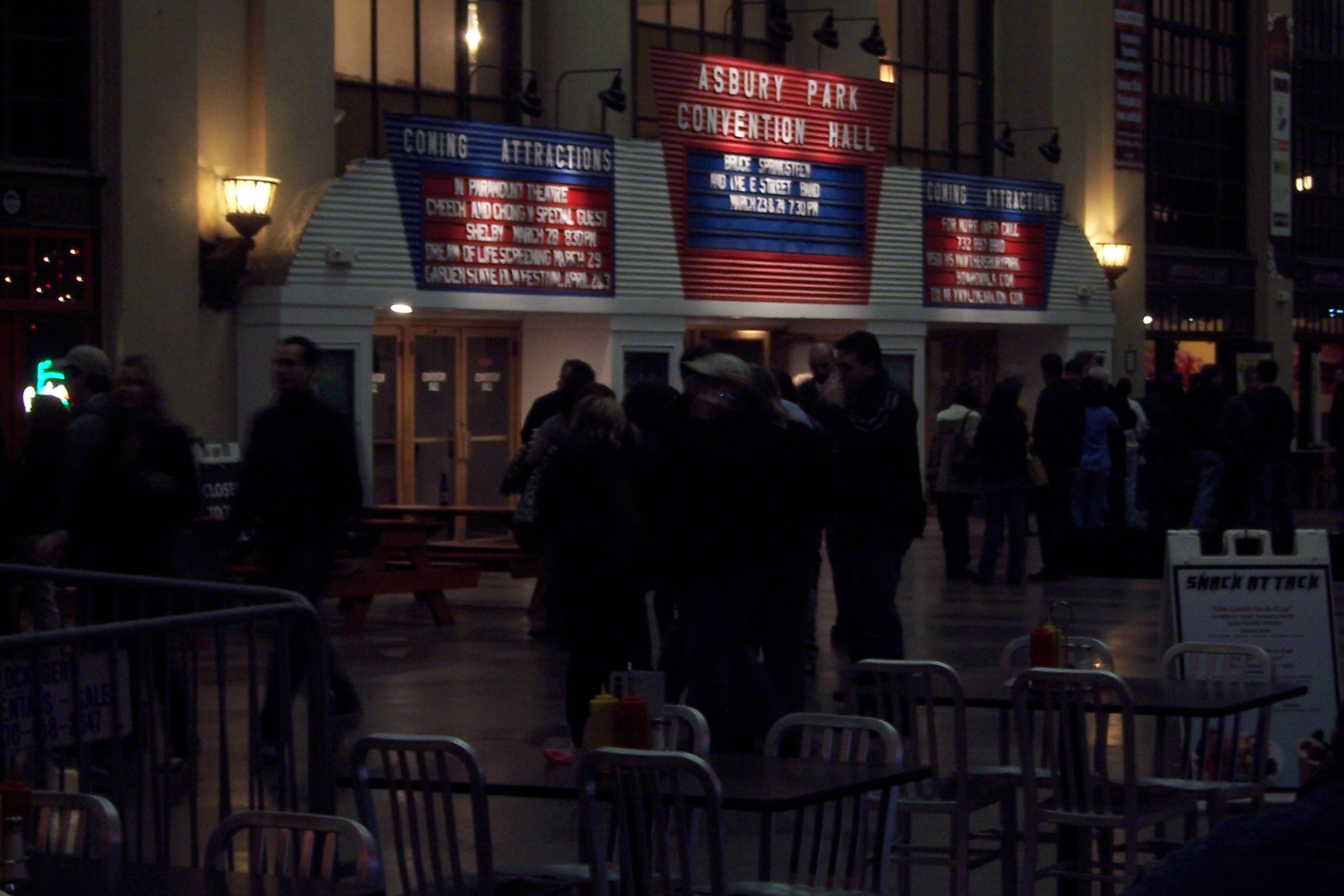
The scene at the first rehearsal show for the tour, at Asbury Park Convention Hall, March 23, 2009.

One idea under early consideration was to include a mini-set at each stop, containing a full performance of one of Springsteen's classic albums. Van Zandt predicted that they would play most of Working on a Dream during the initial stages of the tour, but what the rest of the show would be was uncertain. If the full album idea did go forward, he thought his double album The River (1980) combined with outtakes from those sessions would make a full show on its own. Nothing came of the full album notion right away; it would have to wait until the tour's U.S. third leg to materialize.

Per past practice, Springsteen performed a couple of public rehearsal shows at Asbury Park Convention Hall before beginning the tour proper. The eight-minute "Outlaw Pete" from Working on a Dream opened and various other selections from the album were played, but the show generally included patterns and staples of the early Magic Tour and other previous outings. Jay Weinberg did some of the drumming, and the band was augmented by Curtis King Jr. and Cindy Mizelle (both veterans of the Sessions Band Tour) as additional backing vocalists.

=== North American first leg ===
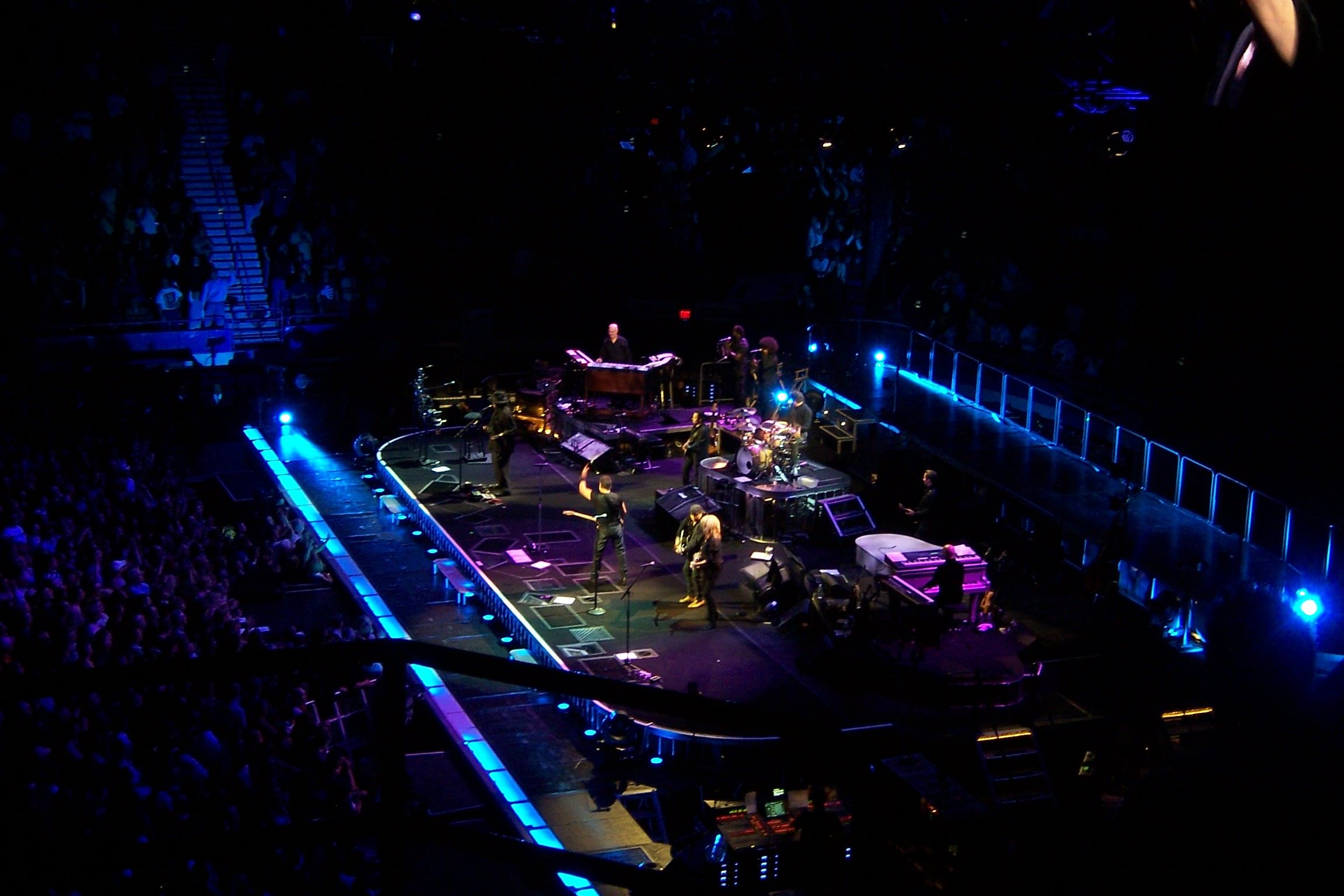
Deep blue stage lighting matched the album cover's look and feel during a tour performance of "Working on a Dream", one of the few new songs played. Hartford Civic Center, April 24, 2009.

Once the first leg of the tour proper began at San Jose, California, on April 1, the consistent show opener was "Badlands" – whose ending, or false ending, was framed with a recurrence of the Magic Tour's question of "Is there anybody alive out there?" – several things became apparent. Typical shows contained only three songs from Working on a Dream: "Outlaw Pete" (initially accompanied by a fog machine), "Working on a Dream" and "Kingdom of Days". This was in stark departure from all previous Springsteen tours, when material from newly released albums was heavily featured. One other recently released Springsteen song, "The Wrestler", was also included in about half the set lists, although it did not share the new album's romantic pop style. Of the other Working on a Dream songs, a couple were never attempted in private rehearsal; some others were rehearsed privately but not publicly; "This Life" and "Surprise Surprise" did not survive past the first Asbury Park rehearsal show; "Good Eye" did not survive past the first proper show; and "My Lucky Day" was played in the first three shows before being dropped. The disappearance of "This Life" and "My Lucky Day" were especially notable, given the former had an elaborate, extended multi-part Beach Boys-style "Ba ba ba" outro section featuring King and Mizelle in its one rehearsal performance, and that the latter was the album's second single. Nor was the prior album, Magic, given any due, with only "Radio Nowhere" included. Set lists relied mostly upon Springsteen material up through Born in the U.S.A. (1984), The Rising (2002), and a few scattered selections from other periods.

Commenting on the paucity of new material, The Atlanta Journal-Constitution suggested that the whole production would more accurately be named the Havin’ a Blast Tour. The Pittsburgh Post-Gazette said that "The strange thing ... is that the 'Working on a Dream' tour no longer seems to be about 'Working on a Dream'" and suggested that the album was unpopular among many fans and as a result, "Springsteen, always the savvy showman, has chosen not to shove it down anyone's throat." Springsteen fans instantly discussed and analyzed setlists as shows happened on the Backstreets.com BTX website, associated with which Twitter and other sources were used to post, or in some cases crudely broadcast, shows as they happened. E Street bassist Garry Tallent and guitarist Nils Lofgren found themselves amused that fans had complained on the previous Magic Tour of too much new material being played, and were now complaining of too little. Guitarist Steve Van Zandt said that the Working on a Dream songs that were played were "big" songs, so that made up for their lack of number.

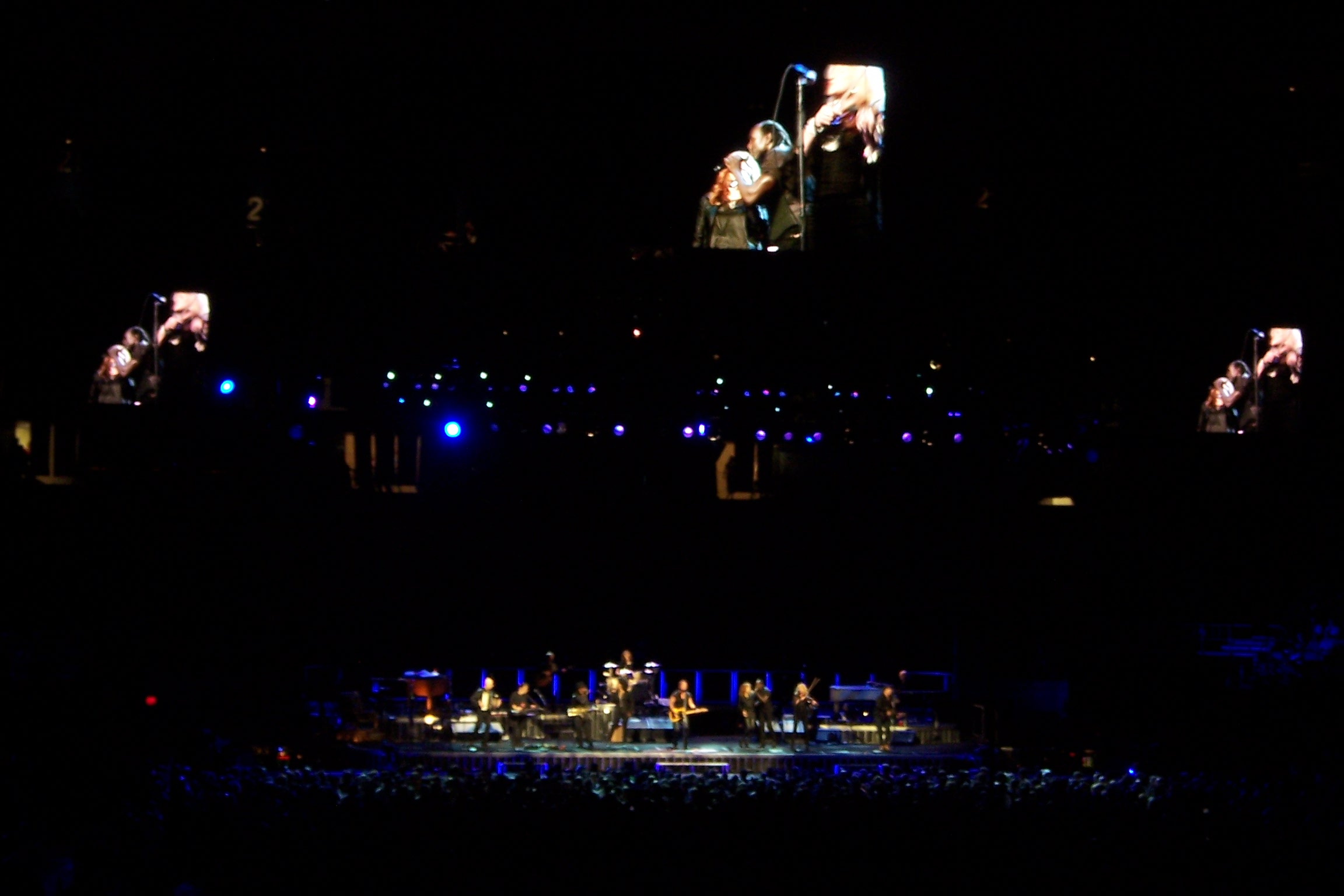
Stephen Foster's "Hard Times Come Again No More" in its customary tour spot of leading off the encores. Meadowlands Arena, May 21, 2009.

One theme that was apparent in the show was the ongoing late-2000s recession. The early part of shows contained a "recession pack" consisting of "Seeds" (brought back from the 1980s), "Johnny 99" (elongated with incongruous train "woo-whoo's"), and either "Youngstown" or "The Ghost of Tom Joad" (both featuring fiery guitar solos from Nils Lofgren). Encores began with a rendition of Stephen Foster's 1850s classic "Hard Times Come Again No More" – which provided one of the few featured spots for King and Mizelle, who otherwise played a lot of tambourine – and later included both of Springsteen's reunion-era encore epics of American struggle, survival and hope, "Land of Hope and Dreams" and "American Land". Van Zandt said that the emergence of the recession theme was in part why the concerts did not showcase the Working on a Dream album. However, one regular moment of optimism was the playing of "Waitin' on a Sunny Day" from The Rising, with Springsteen holding a microphone down to one or more young children in the front of the pit area to sing along to the chorus.

One holdover from the latter stages of the Magic Tour was the "Build Me a House" stage rap, now located in "Working on a Dream". Springsteen would say: "We're not just here to rock the house tonight. We're going to build a house.... We're going to use the good news and we're going to use the bad news. We've got all the news we need – on this stage and in those seats."

An even more visible holdover was the 'signs' segment. This would begin when Springsteen collected request signs from the pit audience as an extended introduction to "Raise Your Hand" was played. Once that song completed, Springsteen selected two or three numbers to play from the requests. The first was often a garage rock classic such as "Wild Thing", "96 Tears", or "Mony Mony" or a punk rock staple such as "I Wanna Be Sedated" or "London Calling". This activity was billed as "Stump the Band", and led to impromptu arrangements being worked out onstage. Springsteen would sometimes taunt the audience afterwards with declarations that the E Street Band could not be stumped, such as saying in Atlanta's Philips Arena, "...this is the greatest bar band in the land, and if they don't think we know 96 fuckin' Tears!" The immediate introduction of the signs segment surprised even E Street guitarist Nils Lofgren, who thought Springsteen would hold it off until later in the tour. The precise degree of challenge in this segment was unclear, as lyrics were often loaded into the teleprompter that Springsteen uses and in some cases the songs had been soundchecked earlier. In any case, most of the challenges were to the band's shared knowledge of British Invasion, Motown, Stax-Volt, and other 1960s material. Springsteen subsequently said, "we started to take unusual requests and do songs that we'd never played before, just depending on the common memory that the band would have from everyone's individual playing experience as teenagers. We ended up with a system where we can jump on a lot pretty quick." Other honored sign requests were usually for Springsteen songs not normally in the set list.

Show lengths were generally between 2 hours 30 minutes to 2 hours 45 minutes. Springsteen scheduled his two Philadelphia shows at the soon-to-be-demolished Spectrum, commenting that "They don't make arenas like this anymore" and stating that the smaller size and lack of luxury boxes made the old venue "ideal for rock shows." The Spectrum had seen Springsteen's first headlining arena show in 1976 during the Born to Run tours, and now he said they would "fulfill our solemn vow to rock the Spectrum one more time." Accordingly, the band played local act The Dovells' 1963 hit "You Can't Sit Down" among other Philadelphia-related selections. Springsteen voiced similar sentiments about the old-but-still-going Nassau Coliseum, and selected The Soul Survivors' 1967 hit "Expressway to Your Heart" as a tribute to the nearby Long Island Expressway.

Jay Weinberg appeared at a number of shows on the first, North American leg, drumming on anywhere from four songs to half the show. He had been a fan of heavy metal music for much of his life, and in playing with Springsteen he integrated a polyrhythmic approach influenced by metal bands such as Lamb of God, Mastodon and Slipknot with the E Street drumming style derived from big bands and early rock and roll. He received a very positive reaction from both audiences and reviewers as a spark plug for the band, with his vigorous, long-hair-flying style inviting comparisons to Dave Grohl and his potential for replacing his father drawing allusions to Wally Pipp. Chicago Tribune critic Greg Kot wrote, "All hail Jay Weinberg. ... With [him drumming] the band's chemistry was slightly unsettled for the better. ... His fills during 'Radio Nowhere' kicked the song, and the concert, into a higher gear, and galvanized a band that was starting to pace itself." Jay Weinberg said "it's a summer job that anybody would want," while Max Weinberg said Jay's segments allowed him a "total out-of-body experience. For the first time in – I've been with Bruce for 35 years – I've been able to go out in the audience and enjoy a Bruce Springsteen and the E Street Band concert." Jay Weinberg played his first full show on May 14 at the Times Union Center in Albany, New York, as Max Weinberg was in California to prepare test runs for The Tonight Show with Conan O'Brien start. Springsteen said of the occasion, "This is the first night in 35 years that somebody else sat at the drums." Overall, Modern Drummer magazine's editor said that a college freshman playing on one of the year's biggest rock tours was "certainly a unique story". For the final Meadowlands Arena shows of the first leg, Jay Weinberg did the first but his father took a red-eye flight back from Los Angeles to do the second.

=== Western European second leg ===
Once the show moved into its European second leg, more Working on a Dream songs began to sporadically appear, with "My Lucky Day" becoming a regular for a while and "Queen of the Supermarket" getting its first airing anywhere. For Scandinavian shows, as band members walked on stage, Lofgren opened with solo accordion performances of local summer-themed specialties, "Idas Sommarvisa" in Sweden and "Du skal ikkje sova bort sumarnatta" in Norway. Jay Weinberg did the first seven shows, as his father was now beginning The Tonight Show with Conan O'Brien.

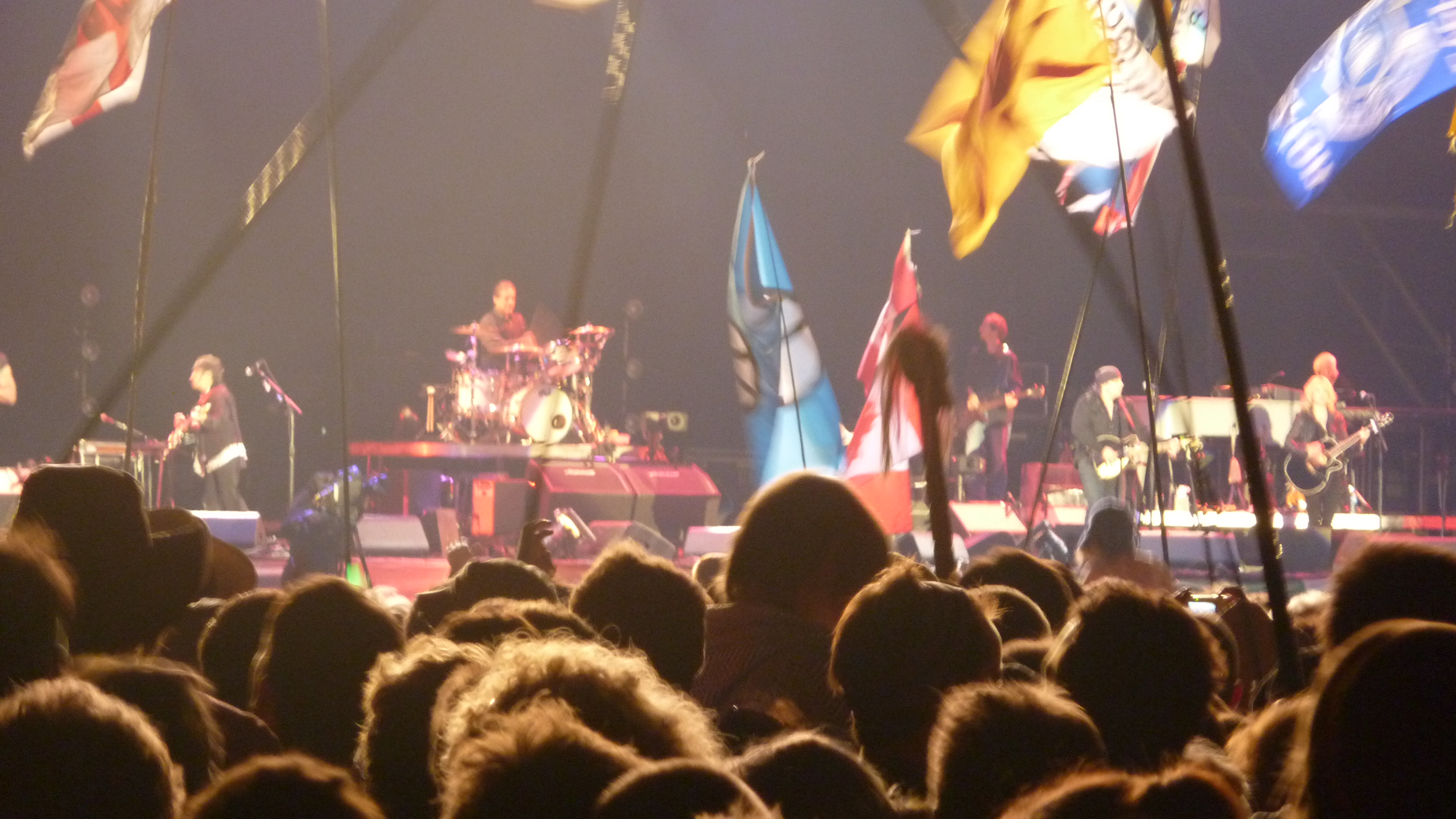
Springsteen and the band perform before a sea of flags at the Glastonbury Festival on June 27, 2009.

Springsteen and the band returned to the United States to make their first-ever appearance at the Bonnaroo Music Festival, as the headlining act on June 13, 2009. Playing before festival audiences who were not guaranteed to be fans of his music was largely new to Springsteen, but after a slow start the show captured over most of the Bonnaroo audience. The following night, Springsteen joined the recently reunited and headlining Phish for three songs, "Mustang Sally", "Bobby Jean" and "Glory Days". Phish guitarist Trey Anastasio said later, "I got to play with Bruce. That's my hero." The Bonnaroo performance of "Outlaw Pete" was included on a Fuse TV show of festival highlights, and the performance of "Tenth Avenue Freeze-Out" included a bit with Triumph the Insult Comic Dog singing along that was included on a Tonight Show with Conan O'Brien segment. Springsteen subsequently reflected, "We played festivals for the very first time on this tour, and that was one of the greatest experiences of all of them. That was an eye-opener. When we played Glastonbury [...] you come out and there's like 100,000 kids in their 20s and under. It was fun playing on bills with other bands, and it's something I'd do again in the future."

On June 25, Max Weinberg departed The Tonight Show temporarily for four weeks to join the band for the resumption of its Western European leg, via a comedy bit that had his drum riser turn into a float that took him outside and studio and purportedly to the airport. During this stretch, Jay Weinberg did not appear during any of the shows until reappearing during the Spanish shows at the end of the leg. While Springsteen's wife Scialfa was nowhere to be seen in Europe, their son Evan appeared and played guitar during encores of a number of shows, while Clarence Clemons' nephew Jake also made playing appearances and Springsteen's mother and aunt also took the stage.

He also was the headliner of the Festival des Vieilles Charrues in Brittany, France in July, his only tour stop in France. His son Evan participated in the concert, playing guitar.

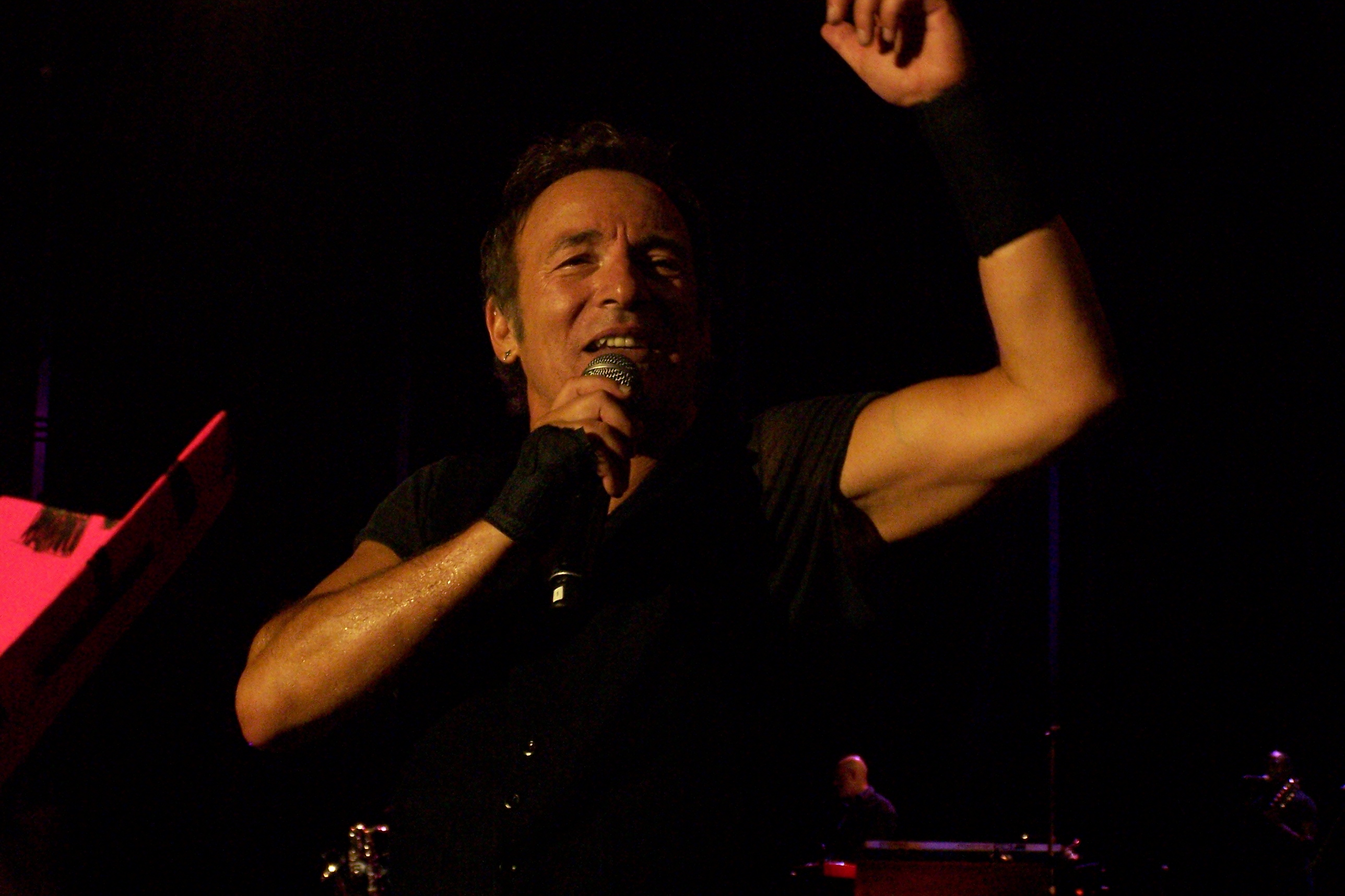
Springsteen performing at the August 1, 2009, show at Estadio José Zorrilla, Valladolid, Spain.

Lofgren continued to open shows, playing national songs on accordion. Set lists further loosened, with many tour premieres showing up in request slots or elsewhere and shows sometimes running to 30 songs in length. After a while, the encore break was disposed with and the show ran continuously to the end without the band ever leaving the stage. Springsteen ran past local curfews at both Dublin shows and at Glastonbury. The Dublin violations resulted in a potential €50,000 fine, but Springsteen mocked the prospect by on-staging a bit: "We have to go, we have a curfew!" with Van Zandt replying, "We don't care about the curfew, this is the curfew breaking Boss and E Street Band!" "American Skin (41 Shots)" made unexpected appearances in Dublin and at several stops in Italy, while "My City of Ruins" was played at Stadio Olimpico in Rome in honor of the victims of the 2009 L'Aquila earthquake. The Western European leg ended with five shows in Spain, at more out-of-the-way locations than in the past. The last of these shows, at the Auditorio Monte do Gozo in Santiago de Compostela, was marred by disorganized security and overbooking by the promoter, leaving some of the approximately 40,000 ticket holders unable to get in. (Dozens of complaints against the promoter were filed to police, city, and consumer authorities the following day.) In any event, the band played "Rockin' All Over the World" and concluded its encore with "Born in the U.S.A." after 1 a.m. local time (the Spanish shows did not begin until 10 p.m.). Max Weinberg immediately flew back to Los Angeles and resumed his role on The Tonight Show later that same day.

=== U.S. third leg ===
The American third leg began in mid-August with shows at outdoor amphitheaters as well as indoor arenas. Shows were often scheduled for weekends, to allow Max Weinberg to play without missing any Tonight Show time; Jay Weinberg played those shows held during the week. Then on September 25, Max Weinberg took a two-month absence from the television show, to join Springsteen for the final portion of the leg. Ticket sales were slower than normal on this leg, partly due to Ticketmaster's new "paperless ticketing" system that may have come into effect due to the earlier problems with Springsteen sales. In arenas that did not sell well, management relocated the people who bought tickets behind the stage to other sections and put up the screen used for stadium and amphitheater shows behind the stage. In a hint to fans to buy up, Van Zandt said, "You never know. This could be the last tour. We do every show like it's our last show anyway." In any case, by September 2009 the tour had sold over two million tickets overall. Even some shows in Philadelphia, long a Springsteen bastion, were not sold out.

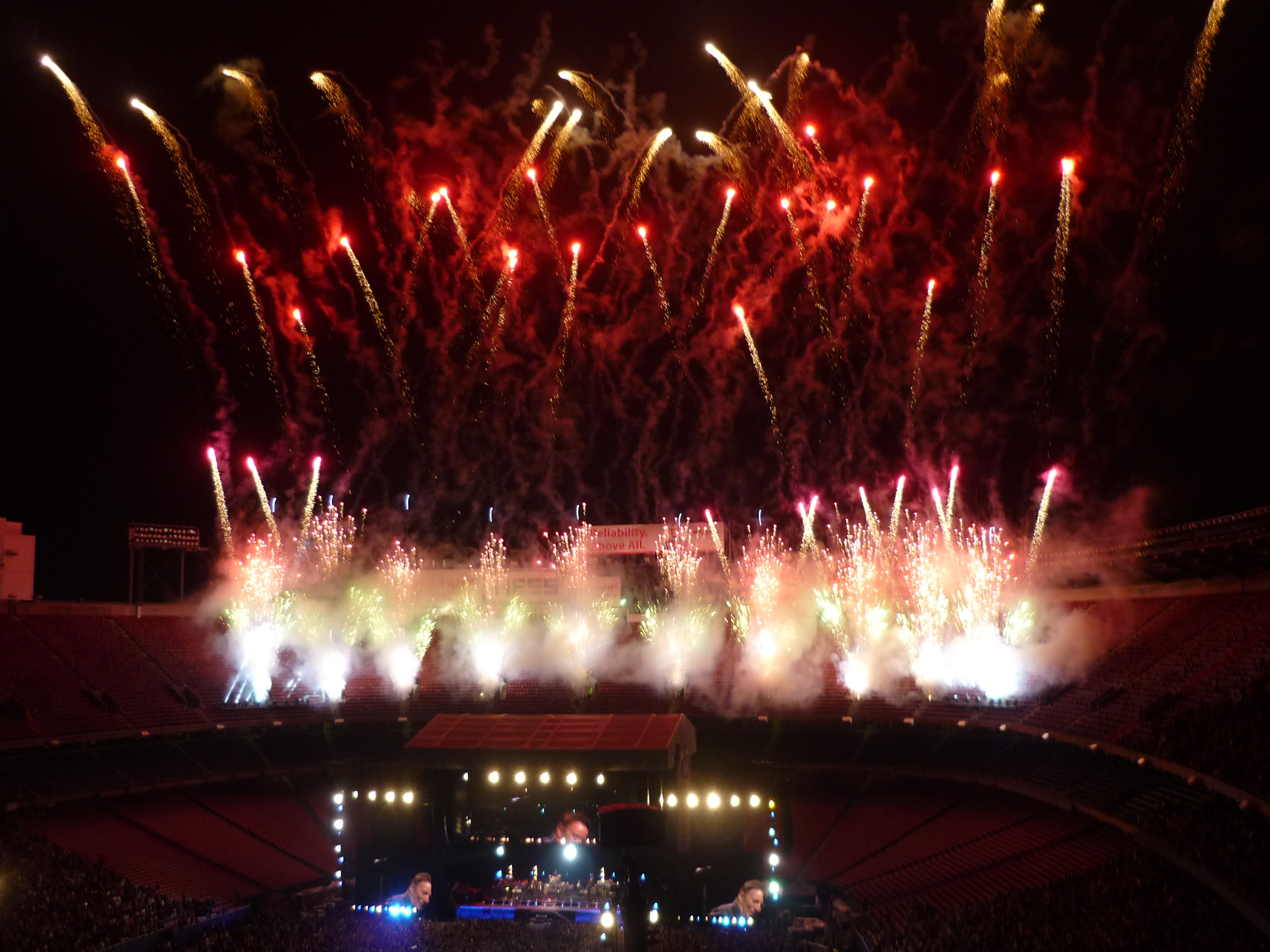
Fireworks go off at the conclusion of the "E! Street! Band!" exhortation at the end of "American Land", during the third of five final shows at Giants Stadium in New Jersey. October 3, 2009.

During the U.S. third leg, it was reported that Born to Run would be featured in its entirety during several shows, possibly in a scheme to boost ticket sales. The full-album idea took fruition with the late September-early October set of five shows at Giants Stadium, which would be the final concerts ever in that venue in Springsteen's home state. Born to Run was played at two shows, Darkness on the Edge of Town at one show, and Born in the U.S.A. at two shows. Springsteen later said of the full album idea, "We had done so many shows and were going to come back around one more time, so we were like, 'OK, what can we do that we haven't done? Let's try to play some of the albums.' There were some people who were starting to do it, it sounded like a good idea, and my audience fundamentally experienced all my music in album form. People took Born to Run home and played it start to finish 100 times; they didn't slip on a cut in the middle. And we made albums – we took a long time, and we built them to last. ... Those records are packed with songs that have lasted 30–35 years. It simply was a way to revitalize the show and do something appealing and fun for the fans, but it ended up being a much bigger emotional experience than I thought it would be."

The Giants Stadium shows were opened with a new Springsteen song written for the occasion, "Wrecking Ball", written from the point of view of the stadium itself: "I was raised out of steel here in the swamps of Jersey, some misty years ago ..." The stand featured several other new touches as well, including Springsteen crowd surfing during "Hungry Heart", evocative behind-the-stage upper-level lighting during "The Rising", and fireworks at the "E! Street! Band!" conclusion of "American Land". The final show, which drew nearly 60,000 people, concluded with the second playing on the stand of "Jersey Girl", dedicated to "all the crew and staff that's worked all these years at Giants Stadium."

The full album versions continued, as well as a localized rendition of "Wrecking Ball", at Springsteen's four shows to close out the Philadelphia Spectrum as well; some 43 different songs were playing during the stand. Apart from the album playings, Springsteen kept setlists flexible during the third leg; sign requests continued, as in Springsteen's words they allowed "the fans to have input into the show in a way that just pumps the blood into everything and enlivens the evening." Born to Run remained the standard full album choice for the rest of the tour, but the two shows at New York's Madison Square Garden saw The Wild, the Innocent & the E Street Shuffle and The River, with the latter's 20-song length dominating the setlist. Springsteen felt The River show succeeded, saying "I sequenced [the album] to feel like a live show, so you have four fast songs and a couple of ballads. It played real well when we went to play it."

Springsteen's show on November 13, 2009, at the Palace of Auburn Hills outside Detroit, Michigan, became well known for Springsteen's multiple statements to the crowd about being in Ohio, the first as he came on, the second during the lyric to "Wrecking Ball", and the third in the "Build me a house" rap during "Working on a Dream". (The band had played in Cleveland, Ohio, three nights earlier.) By now getting some boos from the crowd, guitarist Van Zandt, who had hoped Springsteen would stop making the mistake on his own, finally went over to Springsteen and corrected him: "‘You don’t realize it, but you’re saying Ohio and we’re in Michigan.’ He was like ‘What!?’" Springsteen then told the crowd that he had committed "every front man's nightmare," and made a show of saying "Michigan" from then on. The Spinal Tap-esque blunder attracted worldwide television and print publicity. (The show subsequently featured a rare performance of Bob Seger's "Ramblin' Gamblin' Man", appealing to Seger's fan base in Detroit.) Springsteen made joking references to being in Ohio, or made exaggerated statements as to being in the correct state, in subsequent shows.

During the final stretch of the tour, the final encores of many shows presented a long, rousing, ebullient rendition of Jackie Wilson's classic "(Your Love Keeps Lifting Me) Higher and Higher". Showcasing featured vocals from Cindy Mizelle or Curtis King Jr. and trumpet solos from Curt Ramm, the song stretched to eight minutes with key changes, reprises, and walks through the pit area by Springsteen and the singers, and became recognized as one of the highpoints of the entire tour. Springsteen dispelled any notion of this being the final E Street Band show or the last for a long time; in an interview near the end of the tour he said, "We're playing to an audience now that will outlive us. But at the same time the band is very, very powerful right now. And part of the reason it's powerful is that it's carrying a lot of very strong cumulative history. You come and you see 35 years of a speeding train going down the track, and you're gonna get to be on the front end of it. We look forward to many, many more years of touring and playing and enjoying it."

The tour concluded with the November 22, 2009, show at HSBC Arena in Buffalo, New York. Fans came from far away and the show dominated the feel of the city that day. The full album played was Springsteen's first, Greetings from Asbury Park, N.J., which he wryly said "was the miracle. This was the record that took everything from way below zero to ... one." The performance of it was dedicated to his first manager and producer, Mike Appel, who was present in the audience, and featured rare renditions of "Mary Queen of Arkansas" (the first ever with the E Street Band) and "The Angel". Other rarities peppered the 34-song, nearly 3½-hour night, including Chuck Willis's "(I Don't Want to) Hang Up My Rock and Roll Shoes" and, to mark Steven Van Zandt's birthday, totally obscure outtake "Restless Nights" (supposedly Van Zandt's favorite Springsteen song) and a now-unusual second song from the current album, "Surprise Surprise". Near the end he said, "So we're gonna say goodbye, but just for a little while ... a very little while ..." The tour finished not with the emotional statement in song that some other Springsteen tours have in the 2000s, but instead with John Fogerty's "Rockin' All Over the World".

== Critical and commercial reception ==
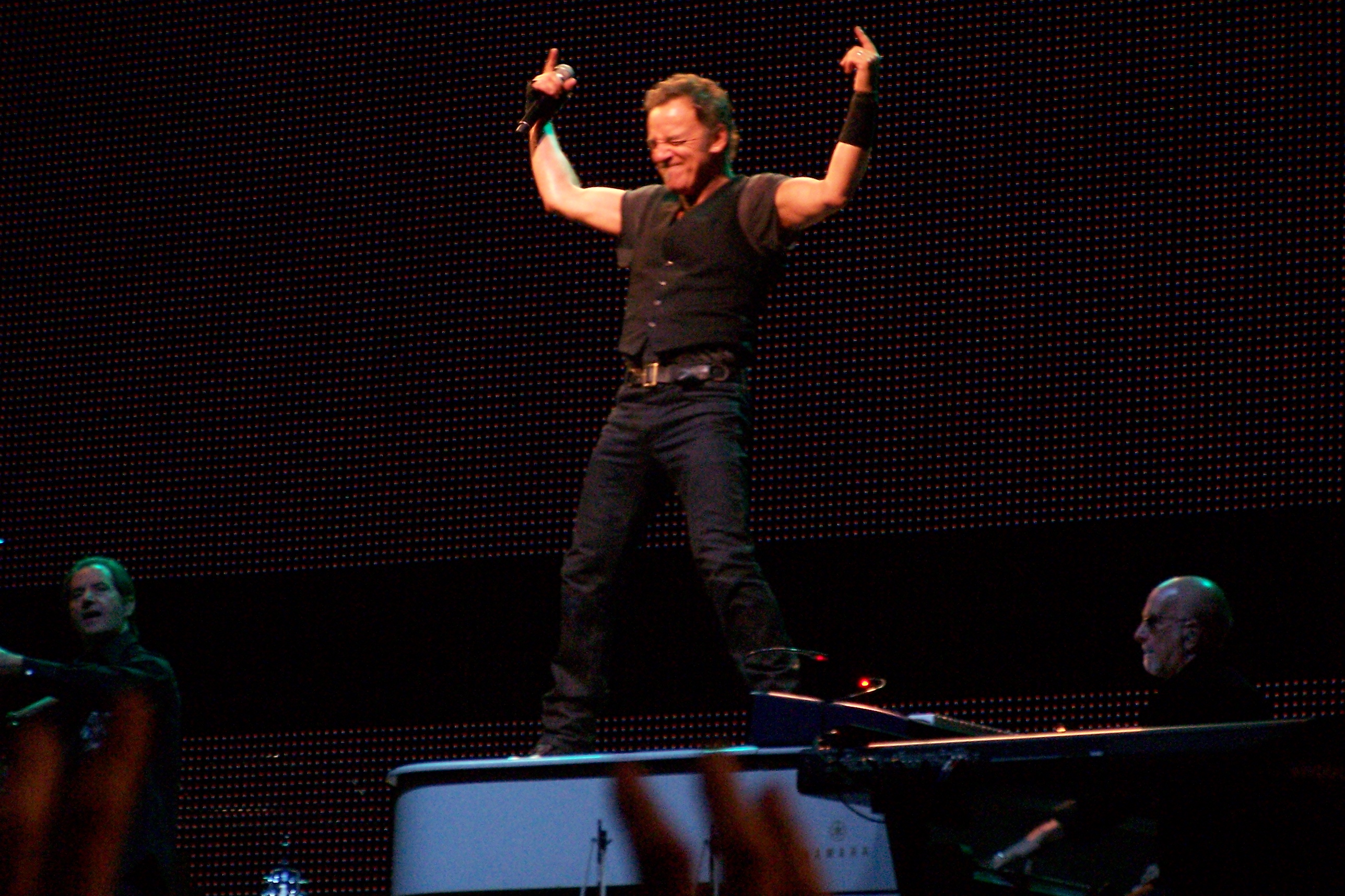
Springsteen exhorting the audience during "Raise Your Hand", August 1, 2009, at Estadio José Zorrilla, Valladolid, Spain.

Newspaper reviews of the show often commented on the high level of energy and stamina the nearly 60-year-old Springsteen brought to the concerts. The Atlanta Journal-Constitution and the Chicago Tribune favorably compared Springsteen to the rest of the band in this regard, saying "Some of the guys in the band look their age" and "they lack the physicality, the sustained urgency of their prime."

The Philadelphia Inquirer and the San Jose Mercury News both commented on the fundamental problem that Springsteen seemed to be facing on the tour. The former said "Bruce Springsteen may well have miscalculated earlier this year when he released Working on a Dream, one of the most hopeful and downright happy sounding albums of his career just as a cratering economy was rendering the songs of struggle and strife that are his stock in trade more resonant than they have sounded in years." The latter said, "As Don Rumsfeld might say, you don't go on tour with the album you wish you had, you go on tour with the album you've got. So Springsteen faces the tough task of hyping a new romantic pop record while simultaneously offering hope and support to a wounded nation – not an easy task." Rolling Stone voiced a similar theory. Chicago Tribune critic Greg Kot wrote that "If there was a disappointment, it was that Springsteen didn’t make a stronger case for his latest album, Working on a Dream. I’m not a fan of the album, but I always look forward to how the singer reinvents his studio work on the stage. In this case, however, he barely touched the new material ..." Views on one, the early-in-show, eight-minute "Outlaw Pete" – one of the few new material centerpieces – varied considerably.

The San Jose Mercury News and the Connecticut Post both gave the show a mixed review, with the former saying it was "decidedly subpar" and latter saying "the concert itself wasn't as captivating as past visits to the state." The Atlanta Journal-Constitution and The Philadelphia Inquirer were unreserved in their praise, with the former saying Springsteen "deliver[ed] a show that proves boomer-oriented rock 'n' roll can still tear it up" and the latter saying Springsteen adapted to circumstances "with an altered game plan that wisely plays to his strengths". The Greensboro, North Carolina News & Record said that "Springsteen and the E Street Band were received like conquering heroes during an exhilarating three-hour show that repeatedly drove the adoring, near-sellout crowd into fist-thrusting, sing-along frenzies." The Globe and Mail said of the tour's sole Canadian show, "an evening with Bruce Springsteen and the E Street Band still ranks as the epitome of the rock concert experience." Rolling Stone said of the first leg's concluding New Jersey shows, "Springsteen tours don’t usually hit highs like this until the end, but the band has essentially been on the road since September 2007."

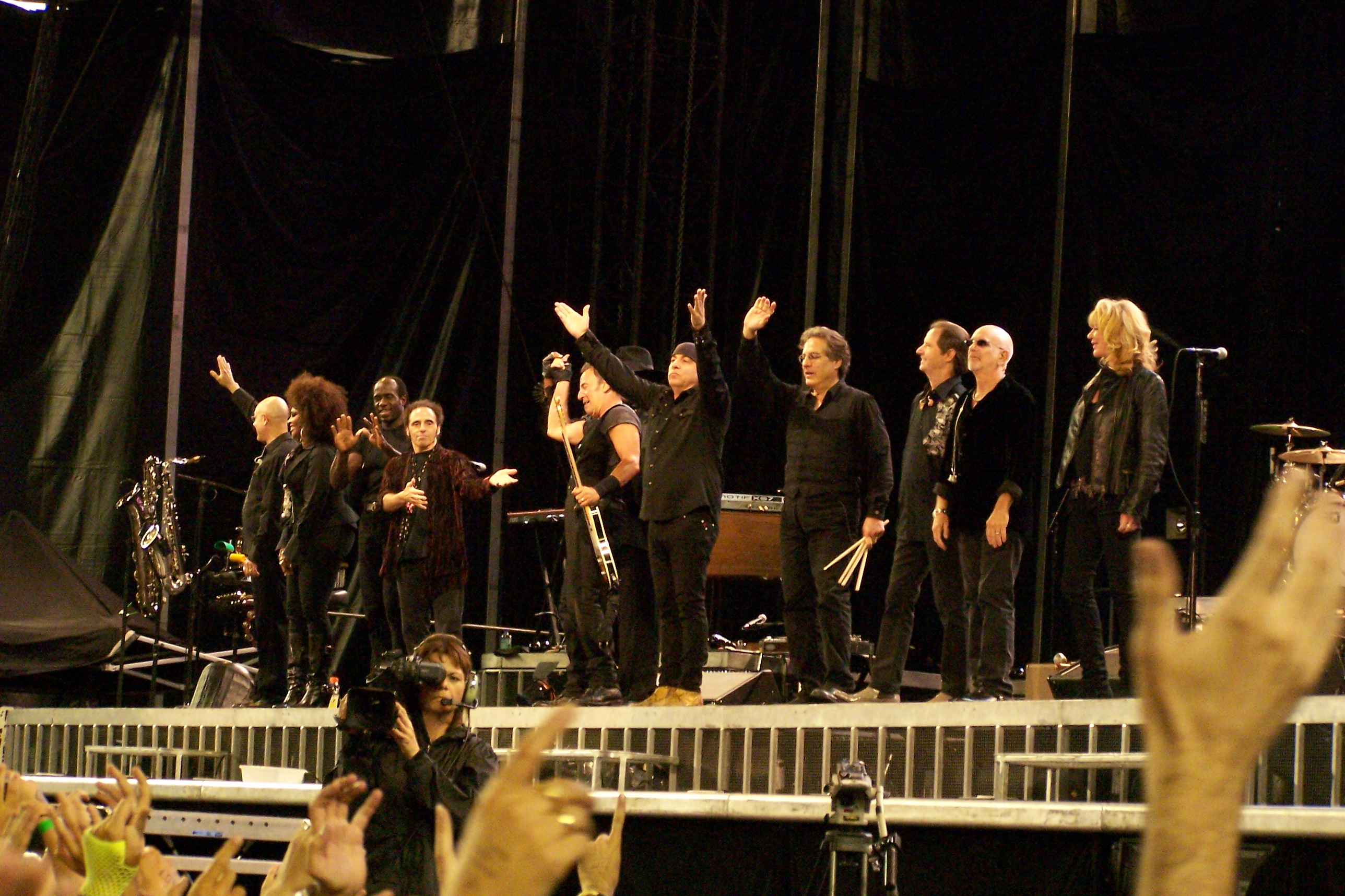
The entire band stage front at the conclusion of the August 1, 2009, show at Estadio José Zorrilla, Valladolid, Spain.

Of the European shows, critical reaction was generally quite favorable. The Irish Times said Springsteen showing no signs of age as he neared his 60th birthday, despite taking a spill during his stage antics in rainy Dublin, and remarked upon how "a set that features so many songs about the toughness of life ... can be delivered with such extraordinary verve that by the time you leave, you’re very glad to be alive." The Independent echoed the sentiment in reviewing the Hyde Park show, writing that he showed "the vigour of a frontman a third of his age" and that "Springsteen's intensity was staggering from first powerful vocal to final thrashed-out chord." The Bath Chronicle saluted Springsteen's performance at Glastonbury, saying "As all the tickets were sold before Springsteen was even confirmed on the bill, he must have known he was facing something very rare for him – the musical equivalent of a sporting 'away match' where not everyone was necessarily a worshipper at the altar of Bruce." They concluded that Springsteen gave "a performance of passion, exuberance, exhilaration and musical majesty" while sticking with his standard tour set list and not resorting to playing many of his better-known hits.

Of the final Giants Stadium stand, the New York Daily News said that "Wrecking Ball" was "a rousing declaration of defiance in the face of destruction", and overall said that "Once again, this proved [Springsteen] to be one of the few performers charismatic enough, and anthemic enough, to use the stadium scale to his advantage." Entertainment Weekly called "Wrecking Ball" "an inspiring start to another of the marathon three-hour shows Springsteen still manages to put on night after night." The New York Times said of the full performance of Born in the U.S.A. that "Springsteen sang with deeper nuance ... the songs have not faded." Greg Kot of the Chicago Tribune said that while during the first leg of the tour the band had "appeared to be running on fumes", the Born to Run album performance was "easily the best Springsteen show with the E Streeters I'd seen since the '80s."

Looking back on the tour as a whole, and in combination with the preceding Magic Tour, Billboard magazine cover story stated that "Even for an artist who has largely built his career on epic shows, Springsteen and the E Streeters have managed to find yet another gear at this stage in their legendary career." Springsteen himself said, "With the end of these shows, we're coming to the end of a decade-long project that really was a tremendous renewal of the power, the strength and the service that our band hopefully provides." Springsteen also touted the quality of the shows: "I believe if you come and see us now you're seeing the best E Street Band that's ever played." Specific shows from the tour were named as among the best concerts of 2009 by Spin magazine, The Philadelphia Inquirer, the Pittsburgh Post-Gazette, and the Chicago Tribune.

Springsteen himself remained quite interested in his and the band's commercial fortunes. He said before the tour's start that remaining popular had been one of his motivations for the Super Bowl appearance: "I've said no for about 10 years or however long they've been asking, but, I tell you, we played on the last tour and there were some empty seats here and there and, well, there shouldn't be any empty seats at an E Street Band show. I hold pride that we remain one of the great wonders of the world ... so sometimes you got to remind people a little bit."

Through September 2009, the Working on a Dream Tour was in the top five in grosses of 2009 tours worldwide, alongside the U2 360° Tour, Coldplay's Viva la Vida Tour, and AC/DC's Black Ice World Tour. For all of 2009, the Working on a Dream Tour was the third-highest-grossing tour, trailing only U2 360° and Madonna's Sticky & Sweet Tour. It grossed over $156 million, was seen by over 1.7 million ticket holders, and sold out 42 of 72 non-festival shows. Unlike the past Magic and Devils & Dust Tours, the Working on a Dream Tour failed to win any Billboard Touring Awards. The tour completed a busy ten years on the road for Springsteen, who ranked fourth among pop artists for the decade in terms of total touring grosses.

== Broadcasts and recordings ==
Several of the tour's festival appearances aired on television or radio during 2009.

One song's worth of the June 13 Bonnaroo Music Festival appearance, "Outlaw Pete", made it into a U.S. packaged broadcast of festival highlights for television, "The Best of Bonnaroo 2009", that appeared on Fuse TV on June 20. The performance of that song subsequently appeared on a Live From Bonnaroo 2009 DVD.

Portions of the June 27 Glastonbury Festival performance were aired live on BBC Two television and BBC 6 Music radio. A number of fans complained that the full set had not been shown by the BBC, which in turn said the set had been too long to broadcast in its entirety. Televised highlights were later shown on BBC Four and BBC HD.

In conjunction with the Fourth of July holiday in the United States, E Street Radio featured 45 minutes from the July 3 Frankfurt Commerzbank Arena show.

In the United States, the Hard Rock Calling Hyde Park appearance was included in an August 21 broadcast on the VH1, VH1 Classic and Palladia cable channels; seven Springsteen and E Street Band performances, including "London Calling" to open the program, were included in amongst other artists' performances.

Several shows were filmed, but at the tour's conclusion no decisions had been made about whether to release them on DVD or other media. In June 2010, London Calling: Live in Hyde Park was released: a 163-minute, near-complete Blu-ray/DVD accounting of the named show.

Several shows were released as part of the Bruce Springsteen Archives:

- HSBC Arena, Buffalo, NY, 11/22/09 released on December 23, 2016
- Wachovia Spectrum, Philadelphia, PA 10/20/09 released on July 13, 2017
- MSG Nov 08, 2009 released on June 1, 2018
- Nassau Coliseum, 05/04/09 released on February 7, 2020
- MSG November 7, 2009 released on December 24, 2020
- Cleveland November 10, 2009 released on March 4, 2022
- Philadelphia 10.14.09 released on December 8, 2023

== Tour dates ==
List of concerts, showing date, city, country, venue, tickets sold, number of available tickets and amount of gross revenue
Date	City	Country	Venue	Attendance	Revenue
North America
April 1, 2009	San Jose	United States	SAP Center	16,713 / 17,196	$1,535,889
April 3, 2009	Glendale	United States	Gila River Arena	15,433 / 15,433	$1,377,875
April 5, 2009	Austin	United States	Frank Erwin Center	15,654 / 15,654	$1,302,672
April 7, 2009	Tulsa	United States	BOK Center	12,382 / 12,382	$1,039,926
April 8, 2009	Houston	United States	Toyota Center	12,488 / 12,488	$1,106,977
April 10, 2009	Denver	United States	Pepsi Center	17,202 / 17,414	$1,555,204
April 15, 2009	Los Angeles	United States	Los Angeles Memorial Sports Arena	31,080 / 33,094	$2,807,010
April 16, 2009	Los Angeles	United States	Los Angeles Memorial Sports Arena	31,080 / 33,094	$2,807,010
April 21, 2009	Boston	United States	TD Garden	33,035 / 33,477	$3,006,655
April 22, 2009	Boston	United States	TD Garden	33,035 / 33,477	$3,006,655
April 24, 2009	Hartford	United States	XL Center	15,168 / 15,168	$1,405,050
April 26, 2009	Atlanta	United States	Philips Arena	14,361 / 15,190	$1,324,980
April 28, 2009	Philadelphia	United States	Wachovia Spectrum	35,165 / 35,165	$3,389,857
April 29, 2009	Philadelphia	United States	Wachovia Spectrum	35,165 / 35,165	$3,389,857
May 2, 2009	Greensboro	United States	Greensboro Coliseum	17,234 / 19,462	$1,573,072
May 4, 2009	Uniondale	United States	Nassau Coliseum	16,623 / 16,623	$1,548,658
May 5, 2009	Charlottesville	United States	John Paul Jones Arena	12,099 / 12,099	$1,058,115
May 7, 2009	Toronto	Canada	Air Canada Centre	18,103 / 18,103	$1,438,244
May 8, 2009	University Park	United States	Bryce Jordan Center	14,238 / 14,238	$1,305,880
May 11, 2009	St. Paul	United States	Xcel Energy Center	18,369 / 18,369	$1,698,637
May 12, 2009	Chicago	United States	United Center	19,828 / 19,828	$1,870,670
May 14, 2009	Albany	United States	Times Union Center	15,096 / 15,096	$1,377,450
May 15, 2009	Hershey	United States	Hersheypark Stadium	29,745 / 29,745	$2,859,106
May 18, 2009	Washington, D.C.	United States	Verizon Center	17,859 / 18,261	$1,680,376
May 19, 2009	Pittsburgh	United States	Mellon Arena	16,572 / 16,881	$1,367,577
May 21, 2009	East Rutherford	United States	Izod Center	38,502 / 38,502	$3,559,260
May 23, 2009	East Rutherford	United States	Izod Center	38,502 / 38,502	$3,559,260
Europe
May 30, 2009	Landgraaf	Netherlands	Pinkpop Festival	65,000	—N/a
June 2, 2009	Tampere	Finland	Ratinan Stadion	31,402 / 31,402	$3,326,646
June 4, 2009	Stockholm	Sweden	Stockholms Stadium	99,024 / 99,024	$9,877,161
June 5, 2009	Stockholm	Sweden	Stockholms Stadium	99,024 / 99,024	$9,877,161
June 7, 2009	Stockholm	Sweden	Stockholms Stadium	99,024 / 99,024	$9,877,161
June 9, 2009	Bergen	Norway	Koengen	47,000 / 51,000	$4,613,805
June 10, 2009	Bergen	Norway	Koengen	47,000 / 51,000	$4,613,805
North America
June 13, 2009	Manchester	United States	Bonnaroo Festival	75,000	—N/a
Europe
June 27, 2009	Glastonbury	England	Glastonbury Festival	130,000	—N/a
June 28, 2009	London	England	Hard Rock Calling	50,000	—N/a
June 30, 2009	Bern	Switzerland	Stade de Suisse	36,538 / 36,538	$3,816,416
July 2, 2009	Munich	Germany	Olympiastadion	39,896 / 44,186	$3,723,108
July 3, 2009	Frankfurt	Germany	Commerzbank Arena	40,471 / 40,471	$3,765,940
July 5, 2009	Vienna	Austria	Ernst Happel Stadion	37,798 / 42,380	$3,324,987
July 8, 2009	Herning	Denmark	MCH Outdoor Arena	49,947 / 49,947	$4,770,172
July 11, 2009	Dublin	Ireland	RDS Arena	80,428 / 80,428	$8,760,349
July 12, 2009	Dublin	Ireland	RDS Arena	80,428 / 80,428	$8,760,349
July 14, 2009	Glasgow	Scotland	Hampden Park	50,544 / 50,544	$4,378,752
July 16, 2009	Carhaix	France	Festival des Vieilles Charrues	—N/a	—N/a
July 19, 2009	Rome	Italy	Stadio Olimpico	37,834 / 42,479	$2,944,904
July 21, 2009	Turin	Italy	Stadio Olimpico Grande Torino	32,774 / 32,774	$2,639,310
July 23, 2009	Udine	Italy	Stadio Friuli	28,356 / 28,356	$2,104,035
July 26, 2009	Bilbao	Spain	San Mames Stadium	36,318 / 36,935	$3,409,189
July 28, 2009	Seville	Spain	La Cartuja Olimpic Stadium	24,030 / 36,724	$2,204,863
July 30, 2009	Benidorm	Spain	Estadio Municipal de Foietes	19,629 / 34,150	$1,722,842
August 1, 2009	Valladolid	Spain	Estadio Jose Zorrilla	30,893 / 34,000	$3,040,354
August 2, 2009	Compostela	Spain	Auditorio Monte do Gozo	36,502 / 36,502	$3,381,498
North America
August 19, 2009	Hartford	United States	Xfinity Theatre	15,745 / 24,729	$950,865
August 22, 2009	Mansfield	United States	Xfinity Center	31,842 / 39,800	$2,546,748
August 23, 2009	Mansfield	United States	Xfinity Center	31,842 / 39,800	$2,546,748
August 25, 2009	Saratoga Springs	United States	Saratoga Performing Arts Center	17,682 / 25,559	$1,047,945
September 12, 2009	Tampa	United States	MidFlorida Credit Union Amphitheatre	13,763 / 19,144	$1,011,698
September 13, 2009	Sunrise	United States	BB&T Center	11,586 / 13,836	$1,049,482
September 16, 2009	Greenville	United States	Bon Secours Wellness Arena	10,281 / 10,938	$831,990
September 20, 2009	Chicago	United States	United Center	18,249 / 18,249	$1,739,826
September 21, 2009	Des Moines	United States	Wells Fargo Arena	8,451 / 15,448	$678,928
September 30, 2009	East Rutherford	United States	Giants Stadium	260,668 / 270,388	$22,570,336
October 2, 2009	East Rutherford	United States	Giants Stadium	260,668 / 270,388	$22,570,336
October 3, 2009	East Rutherford	United States	Giants Stadium	260,668 / 270,388	$22,570,336
October 8, 2009	East Rutherford	United States	Giants Stadium	260,668 / 270,388	$22,570,336
October 9, 2009	East Rutherford	United States	Giants Stadium	260,668 / 270,388	$22,570,336
October 13, 2009	Philadelphia	United States	Wachovia Spectrum	60,416 / 65,120	$5,972,428
October 14, 2009	Philadelphia	United States	Wachovia Spectrum	60,416 / 65,120	$5,972,428
October 19, 2009	Philadelphia	United States	Wachovia Spectrum	60,416 / 65,120	$5,972,428
October 20, 2009	Philadelphia	United States	Wachovia Spectrum	60,416 / 65,120	$5,972,428
October 25, 2009	St. Louis	United States	Scottrade Center	11,178 / 15,048	$847,038
November 2, 2009	Washington, D.C.	United States	Verizon Center	17,545 / 17,545	$1,653,329
November 3, 2009	Charlotte	United States	Time Warner Cable Arena	12,385 / 16,197	$855,357
November 7, 2009	New York City	United States	Madison Square Garden	37,064 / 37,064	$3,459,026
November 8, 2009	New York City	United States	Madison Square Garden	37,064 / 37,064	$3,459,026
November 10, 2009	Cleveland	United States	Quicken Loans Arena	16,232 / 17,261	$1,426,330
November 13, 2009	Auburn Hills	United States	The Palace of Auburn Hills	15,170 / 19,431	$1,169,764
November 15, 2009	Milwaukee	United States	Bradley Center	13,272 / 14,500	$1,039,424
November 18, 2009	Nashville	United States	Bridgestone Arena	11,044 / 14,297	$929,165
November 20, 2009	Baltimore	United States	Royal Farms Arena	14,679 / 14,679	$1,295,766
November 22, 2009	Buffalo	United States	HSBC Arena	18,665 / 18,665	$1,489,441
Total				1,826,246 / 1,953,606	$163,558,357

== Cancelled shows ==
List of cancelled concerts, showing date, city, country, venue and reason for cancellation
Date	City	Country	Venue	Reason
October 26, 2009	Kansas City	United States	Sprint Center	Death in family

== Personnel ==
The E Street Band

- Bruce Springsteen – lead vocals, lead guitar, rhythm guitar, acoustic guitar, harmonica
- Roy Bittan – piano, synthesizer, accordion
- Clarence Clemons – tenor saxophone, baritone saxophone, percussion, pennywhistle, piccolo, harmonica, whistling, background vocals
- Nils Lofgren – rhythm guitar, lead guitar, pedal steel guitar, acoustic guitar, accordion, background vocals
- Patti Scialfa – background vocals, some duet vocals, acoustic guitar, occasional tambourine
- Garry Tallent – bass guitar, rare background vocals, rare tuba
- Steven Van Zandt – rhythm guitar, lead guitar, mandolin, acoustic guitar, background vocals, occasional featured lead vocal
- Max Weinberg – drums, rare tambourine
- Charles Giordano – organ, accordion, electronic glockenspiel, rare piano, occasional background vocals
- Soozie Tyrell – violin, acoustic guitar, percussion, background vocals
- Jay Weinberg – drums
- Curtis King Jr. – background vocals and tambourine
- Cindy Mizelle – background vocals and tambourine
- Curt Ramm – trumpet

Scialfa missed some shows on the first leg due to injuries received from falling off her horse, then due to family responsibilities, and was absent from all the shows on the European leg. She continued to miss all but a handful of shows during the U.S. third leg, including only making it to two of the five final Giants Stadium performances. As on the Magic Tour, Tyrell assumed a more prominent role when Scialfa was absent. (Despite consistently having highly visible profiles during shows, Giordano and Tyrell have not been considered full-fledged E Street Band members in official Springsteen material.) Clemons continued to have a diminished physical role on stage due to his multiple physical problems, and was scheduled for spine surgery once the tour concluded with a 12-month recovery period. (As it happened, Clemons never played with the E Street Band again, suffering a fatal stroke in June 2011.) Jay Weinberg substituted for Max Weinberg on a number of dates, and the two alternated for portions of the show on a number of other dates. Ramm, a veteran of the Sessions Band Tour, played on several songs per show during much of the U.S. third leg.
