= The Wrestler (song) =

Single by Bruce Springsteen

from the album Working on a Dream and The Wrestler
- Released: December 16, 2008
- Recorded: 2008
- Genre: Rock
- Length: 3:51
- Label: Columbia Records
- Songwriter: Bruce Springsteen
- Producer: Bruce Springsteen

Bruce Springsteen singles chronology
"My Lucky Day" (2008)	"The Wrestler" (2008)	"Wrecking Ball" (2009)

Music video
- "The Wrestler" on YouTube

"The Wrestler" is the title song from the 2008 film The Wrestler. The track was written and performed by Bruce Springsteen.

The origins of the song are based in a lost and resumed friendship between Springsteen and Wrestler lead actor Mickey Rourke; Rourke told Springsteen about his upcoming film and asked if Springsteen could write a song for it. Springsteen subsequently did, played it for Rourke and director Darren Aronofsky before a concert. When they liked it, Springsteen gave them the song for no fee.

It first appeared in August 2008 at the 65th Venice International Film Festival debut of the film The Wrestler. In December 2008 it received a nomination for the Golden Globe Award for Best Original Song and won the award during the 66th Golden Globe Awards on January 11, 2009. It also won the 2008 Broadcast Film Critics Association Award for Best Song and was nominated for, but did not win, the 2008 Satellite Award for Best Original Song. The song was widely expected to receive a nomination for the Academy Award for Best Original Song at the 81st Academy Awards, where Springsteen would perform it on the awards show, but in what Rolling Stone termed "shocking news", it was denied a nomination on January 22, 2009, when the Academy nominated only three songs in the category rather than the usual five. The song was nominated for an MTV Movie Award and a Grammy Award, but lost to Miley Cyrus' "The Climb" and A. R. Rahman's "Jai Ho" respectively.

The song was used in the credits of ESPN's 2015 E:60 documentary "WWE: Behind the Curtain."

== Recording and video ==
The recorded version, sans end-credits string introduction, became available on iTunes on December 16, in advance of the film's U.S. major cities openings in the subsequent days. Springsteen recorded it at his Thrill Hill Recording studio in New Jersey, played all the instruments, and produced it himself.

It was then included as a bonus track on Springsteen's late-January 2009 album release, Working on a Dream, although "The Wrestler" was a stark departure from the romantic pop themes and elaborate production of the rest of the album.

A music video for the song was filmed in late January 2009 in a New Brunswick, New Jersey boxing gym, and was released on Springsteen's social networking websites. It shows Springsteen with his hair combed back, in a ring and weightlifting, interspersed with scenes from the film. An extended version of the video was made available on iTunes, and it showed only Springsteen. Finally, a making-of-the-video video was made and released as part of the iTunes package; it contained voiceovers of Springsteen giving his interpretation of the film's main character, how that fit into his normal model of human nature, and how he tried to write the song to reflect this.

The video was included as a bonus feature on the April 2009 DVD release of the film.

== Live performances ==
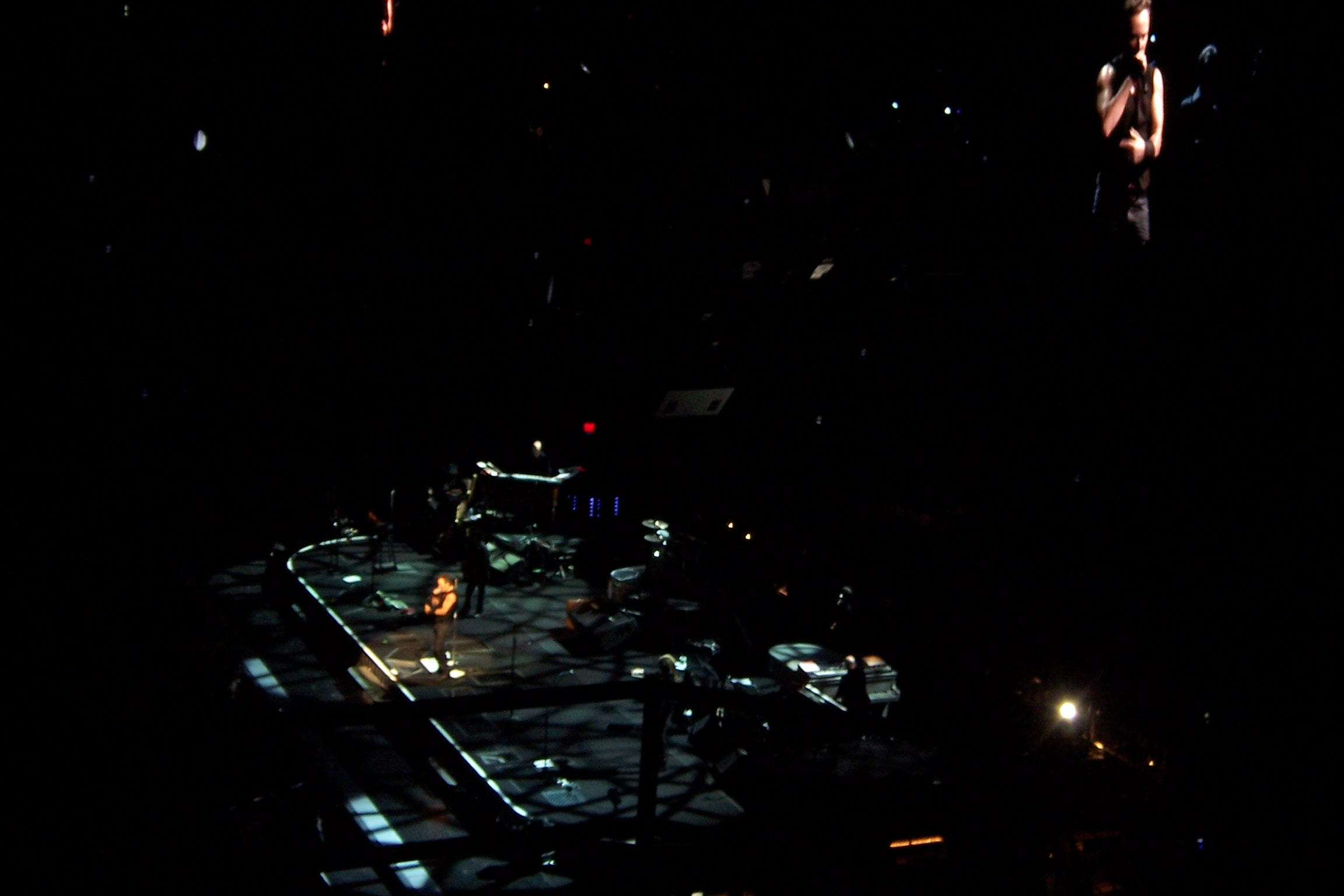
Springsteen and the E Street Band performing the song during the Working on a Dream Tour with the E Street Band. Hartford Civic Center, April 24, 2009.

While Springsteen was not able to perform the song at the Academy Awards ceremony, he gave it a fairly regular slot during the first leg of the 2009 Working on a Dream Tour. Played late in the main set, it was given a long synthesizer-style introduction, a quiet arrangement, and subdued stage lighting. During subsequent legs of the tour the song was rarely played.

== Charts ==
Chart (2008/2009)	Peak position
Australia (ARIA)	158
Canadian Hot 100 (Billboard)	63
Ireland (IRMA)	40
Netherlands (MegaCharts)	56
Norway (VG-lista)	14
Sweden (Sverigetopplistan)	19
UK Singles Chart	93
US Bubbling Under Hot 100 Singles (Billboard)	20

== Accolades ==
Award	Category	Recipient(s)	Result
Broadcast Film Critics Association	Best Song	Bruce Springsteen	Won
Golden Globes	Best Original Song - Motion Picture	Bruce Springsteen	Won
Grammy Awards	Best Song Written for a Motion Picture	Bruce Springsteen	Nominated
MTV Movie Awards	Best Song from a Movie	Bruce Springsteen	Nominated
Satellite Awards	Best Original Song	Bruce Springsteen	Nominated
