= Greatest Hits (Bruce Springsteen & The E Street Band album) =

- Cover of the American edition

Greatest hits album by Bruce Springsteen and The E Street Band
- Released: January 13, 2009
- Recorded: 1972–1984, 2002–2007
- Genre: Rock
- Length: 53:17 (American edition); 79:04 (European edition)
- Label: Columbia

Bruce Springsteen and The E Street Band chronology
Magic Tour Highlights (2008)	Greatest Hits (2009)	Working on a Dream (2009)

Bruce Springsteen chronology
Magic Tour Highlights (2008)	Greatest Hits (2009)	Working on a Dream (2009)

European cover
- Cover of the European edition

Professional ratings
Review scores
Source	Rating
AllMusic (American)	3.5/5 stars
AllMusic (European)	3.5/5 stars

Bruce Springsteen & The E Street Band Greatest Hits is Bruce Springsteen's fifth compilation album, released as a limited edition first in the United States, Canada and Australia on January 13, 2009, exclusively through Wal-Mart retailers. The European edition was released on June 1, 2009.

== History ==
The album is a collection of some of Springsteen's hit singles and popular album tracks through the years. Springsteen released a similar Greatest Hits album in 1995. Unlike the previous release, this album is billed to "Bruce Springsteen & The E Street Band", the first time Springsteen's backing band has been credited with a compilation release. As such, it contains no Springsteen material recorded between 1984 and 2002, during which period he did virtually no studio recording with the E Street Band.

Springsteen's association with Wal-Mart drew puzzled reactions from the media, given the singer's longtime support for labor causes and the company's longtime anti-union actions. Huffington Post writer Tony Sachs pronounced the release one of the "top five boneheaded music industry moves of 2008", while The Wall Street Journal wrote that it reflected the duality of "the liberal singer-songwriter and the commercial juggernaut recording artist." Longtime Springsteen writer Charles R. Cross said that fans were now more accepting of such blatant commercial strategies given the overall slump in the music business. Nevertheless, the release did draw criticism from some fans as well as from labor union activists and independent record store owners. In response, Springsteen manager Jon Landau said, "[L]et's start with the premise that Bruce is already in Wal-Mart. Wal-Mart has been 15% of our sales in recent years. It's not a question of going into Wal-Mart; we're there. They, and other retailers, are all looking for some way to differentiate themselves, and we try to accommodate each one. We're not doing any advertising for Wal-Mart. We haven't endorsed Wal-Mart or anybody else." But then Springsteen himself, during publicity for his appearance at Super Bowl XLIII, admitted that they "dropped the ball" with the association with Wal-Mart, and attributed it to insufficient vetting due to too many activities going on.

== Track listing ==
All songs written by Bruce Springsteen except where noted.

=== US edition ===
1. "Rosalita (Come Out Tonight)" – 7:00
  - From the album The Wild, the Innocent & the E Street Shuffle, 1973
2. "Born to Run" – 4:29
  - From the album Born to Run, 1975
3. "Thunder Road" – 4:48
  - From the album Born to Run
4. "Darkness on the Edge of Town" – 4:32
  - From the album Darkness on the Edge of Town, 1978
5. "Badlands" – 4:02
  - From the album Darkness on the Edge of Town
6. "Hungry Heart" – 3:19
  - From the album The River, 1980
7. "Glory Days" – 4:19
  - From the album Born in the U.S.A., 1984
8. "Dancing in the Dark" – 3:59
  - From the album Born in the U.S.A.
9. "Born in the U.S.A." – 4:38
  - From the album Born in the U.S.A.
10. "The Rising" – 4:47
  - From the album The Rising, 2002
11. "Lonesome Day" – 4:05
  - From the album The Rising
12. "Radio Nowhere" – 3:19
  - From the album Magic, 2007

=== Europe edition ===
1. "Blinded by the Light" – 5:03
  - From the album Greetings from Asbury Park, N.J., 1973
2. "Rosalita (Come Out Tonight)" – 7:00
  - From the album The Wild, the Innocent & the E Street Shuffle
3. "Born to Run" – 4:29
  - From the album Born to Run
4. "Thunder Road" – 4:48
  - From the album Born to Run
5. "Badlands" – 4:02
  - From the album Darkness on the Edge of Town
6. "Darkness on the Edge of Town" – 4:32
  - From the album Darkness on the Edge of Town
7. "Hungry Heart" – 3:19
  - From the album The River
8. "The River" – 5:01
  - From the album The River
9. "Born in the U.S.A." – 4:38
  - From the album Born in the U.S.A.
10. "I'm on Fire" - 2:36
  - From the album Born in the U.S.A.
11. "Glory Days" – 4:19
  - From the album Born in the U.S.A.
12. "Dancing in the Dark" – 3:59
  - From the album Born in the U.S.A.
13. "The Rising" – 4:47
  - From the album The Rising
14. "Lonesome Day" – 4:05
  - From the album The Rising
15. "Radio Nowhere" – 3:19
  - From the album Magic
16. "Long Walk Home" – 4:35
  - From the album Magic
17. "Because the Night" (Springsteen, Patti Smith) – 5:19
  - From the album Live/1975–85, 1986
18. "Fire" - 3:13
  - From the album Live/1975-85

== Personnel ==
- Roy Bittan – piano, synthesizer
- Ernest "Boom" Carter – drums
- Clarence Clemons – saxophone, percussion, backing vocals
- Danny Federici – organ, glockenspiel
- Nils Lofgren - guitar, backing vocals
- Vini "Mad Dog" Lopez – drums
- David Sancious – piano, organ
- Patti Scialfa - backing vocals
- Bruce Springsteen – guitar, lead vocals, harmonica
- Garry Tallent – bass guitar
- Soozie Tyrell – violin, backing vocals
- Max Weinberg – drums
- Steven Van Zandt – guitar, backing vocals

== Charts ==
Chart (2009)	Peak position
Australia	17
Austria	7
Belgium	6
Canada	21
Denmark	3
Finland	5
Germany	25
Ireland	2
Italy	17
Netherlands	4
Norway	3
Spain	6
Sweden	1
Switzerland	12
U.K.	3
U.S. Billboard 200	43
