= Auditorio Monte do Gozo =

Outdoor concert venue in Spain

Coordinates: 42°53′05″N 8°29′58″W

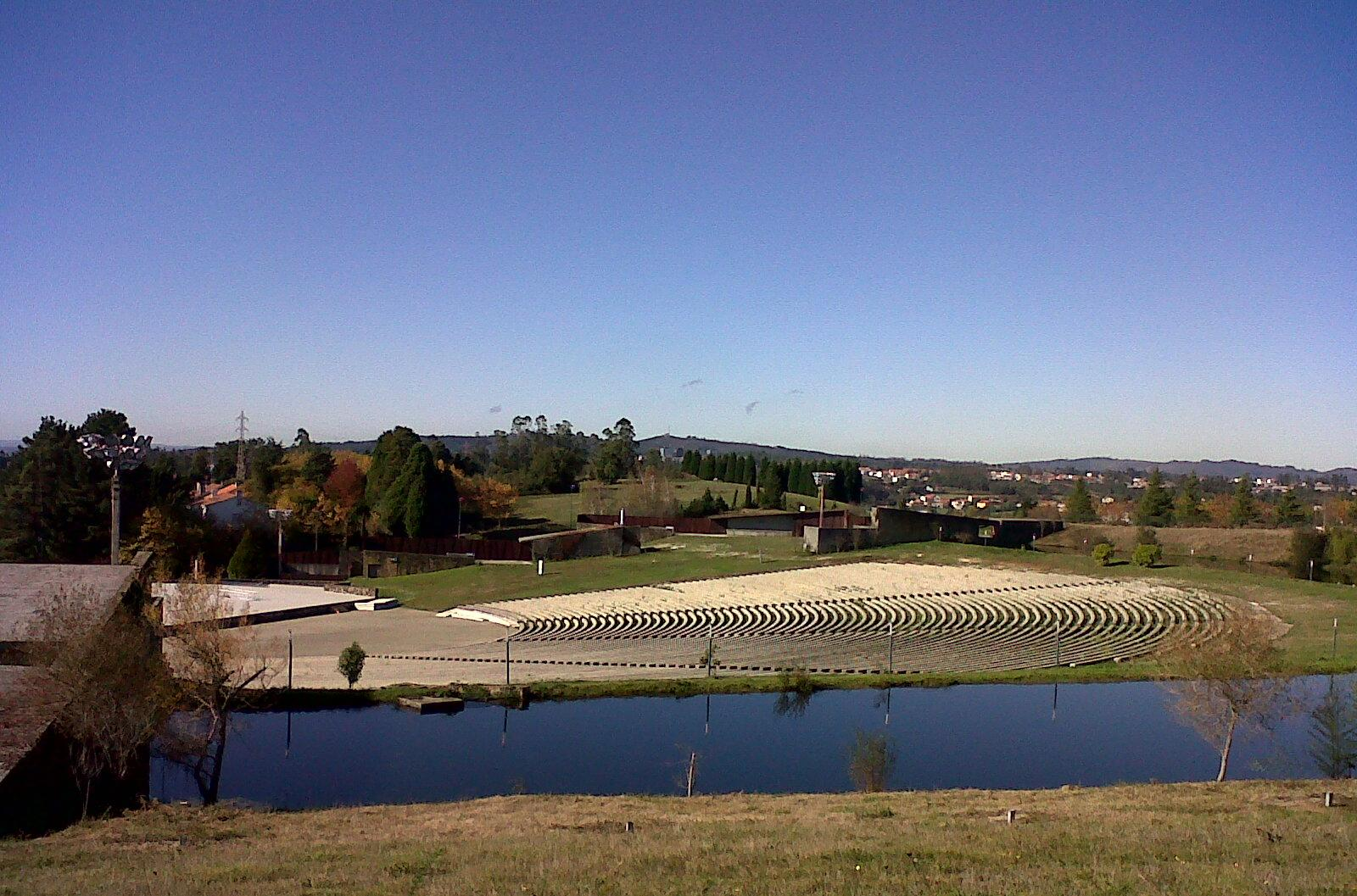
Auditorio Monte do Gozo in 2011

Auditorio Monte do Gozo is an outdoor concert venue in Santiago de Compostela, Galicia, Spain. It is an amphitheatre-like setting, with a stage, an open area, and then rows of concrete bench seating arranged in a semicircle. It has a capacity that has been stated as anywhere from 30,000 to 40,000 people, with one account stating an official capacity at 37,800.

The venue is sited on the Monte do Gozo ("Hill of Joy"), about three kilometers (two miles) outside city centre, which is known for being the hill where Christian pilgrims on the Way of St. James get their first views of the spires of their destination, the Cathedral of Santiago de Compostela. It is reachable by local bus that goes on a small road up the hill; it can also be walked.

It was initially constructed in 1993 for use by the pilgrims. Sponsored by the local government in conjunction with that year's local Holy Year for St. James' Day, the development drew the ire of the Church, which preferred a greater focus on the religious meaning of the area. The concert facility is part of the much larger Ciudad de Vacaciones Monte do Gozo (Monte do Gozo Holiday City), which includes a spread-out, bungalow-style hotel, a hostel, a camping ground, and gardens and walking paths, all on 65 hectares (160 acres).

== Notable Performances ==
Auditorio Monte do Gozo has been the venue for major music acts to appear in Santiago de Compostela. In its first year it saw the Bruce Springsteen and the "Other Band" Tour. In subsequent years came such as The Rolling Stones in 1999 on their Bridges to Babylon Tour. With 2004 being another Jubilee Year, the Xacobeo Festival was held over several days in July, with Bob Dylan, The Cure, and David Bowie all slated to appear (the last of whom cancelled due to illness). The summer also saw the Red Hot Chili Peppers on their By the Way Tour. Following that year, the venue was not used for concerts again until the 2007 Amar es Combatir Tour by Maná. Xacobeo Festival returned for a Holy Year again in August 2010, featuring Muse, Pet Shop Boys, and Jónsi. The site has been used for other music festivals as well, such as MTV Galicia 2010, which headlined Arcade Fire and Echo & the Bunnymen.

A Bruce Springsteen and the E Street Band show on their 2009 Working on a Dream Tour at the Monte Do Gozo was marred by disorganized security and overbooking by the promoter, leaving some of the approximately 40,000 ticket holders unable to get in. Dozens of complaints against the promoter were filed to police, city, and consumer authorities the following day. Ticket availability for the Xacobeo and MTV Galicia festivals the following year were consequently limited to 25,000 people.

The effect of Auditorio Monte do Gozo's existence on Santiago de Compostela has been enough for The New York Times to write, in 2004, "Christian pilgrims and pop stars. ... This city in northwest Spain is full of contradictions, especially in a Jubilee year like this one, when David Bowie, Bob Dylan and other modern idols will descend upon the city's ancient squares."

== See also ==
- List of contemporary amphitheaters
