= My Lucky Day (Bruce Springsteen song) =

Single by Bruce Springsteen

from the album Working on a Dream
- Released: November 28, 2008
- Recorded: 2008
- Genre: Rock
- Length: 4:00
- Label: Columbia
- Songwriter: Bruce Springsteen
- Producer: Brendan O'Brien

Bruce Springsteen singles chronology
"Working on a Dream" (2008)	"My Lucky Day" (2008)	"The Wrestler" (2008)

Music video
- My Lucky Day on Youtube.com

My Lucky Day is a song written and recorded by the American singer-songwriter Bruce Springsteen. It was released as the second single on his 2009 album Working on a Dream.

== History ==
"My Lucky Day" was made available in the U.S. on Amazon.com on December 1, 2008, accompanied by a long music video that showed Springsteen and the band arranging and recording the song. It was also made available as downloadable content for the game Guitar Hero World Tour on January 27, 2009, along with "Born to Run" as part of the Bruce Springsteen Pack, which can be imported into any GH game since World Tour, making it one of only two Springsteen songs ever to appear in the series. It peaked at #18 on the American Triple-A charts in early June.

Despite being a single, the song wasn't played a lot during the Working on a Dream Tour, making just five appearances during Springsteen's U.S. shows and a total of nineteen performances total on the world tour.

== Charts ==
Weekly chart performance for "My Lucky Day"
Chart (2009)	Peak position
Iceland (Tónlistinn)	8
Italy (Musica e Dischi)	41
US Adult Alternative Airplay (Billboard)	18
