= A Night with the Jersey Devil =

2008 single by Bruce Springsteen

Single by Bruce Springsteen

from the album Working on a Dream (Deluxe Edition DVD)
- B-side: "What Love Can Do" (7" vinyl Record Store Day exclusive release)
- Released: October 31, 2008
- Studio: Thrill Hill Recording (Colts Neck, New Jersey)
- Genre: Blues
- Length: 3:42
- Label: Columbia
- Songwriter: Bruce Springsteen
- Producer: Brendan O'Brien

Music video
- "A Night with the Jersey Devil" on YouTube

"A Night with the Jersey Devil" is a song by the American rock singer-songwriter Bruce Springsteen. It was released as a download-only single, accompanied by a video, on October 31, 2008, as a "Halloween treat" on the artist's website. The release featured a handwritten note by Springsteen:

Dear Friends and Fans,
if you grew up in central or south Jersey, you grew up with the "Jersey Devil."
Here's a little musical Halloween treat. Have fun!
— Bruce Springsteen

The video is included the deluxe edition DVD of Springsteen's Working on a Dream album, released in 2009. It is a blues tune with bullet mic vocals, including portions of the Gene Vincent 1958 song "Baby Blue" (specifically, one verse – featured here as the last verse), and therefore Springsteen shares the song's writing credits with the two co-writers of "Baby Blue", Robert Jones and Gene Vincent.

The song was also released on 7" vinyl along with "What Love Can Do" on April 18, 2009, as part of the Record Store Day promotion.

== Background ==
Springsteen's lyrics tell the story of a legendary creature known as the "Jersey Devil"; in 1735 a woman called "Mother Leeds" gave birth to her 13th child, who metamorphosed into an evil creature with bat wings, forked feet and a horse's head; because of this, his parents threw him in a river where he drowned and now haunts the Pine Barrens in New Jersey.
