= Working on a Dream =

Studio album by Bruce Springsteen
- Released: January 27, 2009
- Recorded: Summer 2007–Fall 2008
- Studios: Southern Tracks, Atlanta, Georgia; Avatar, New York, New York; Henson, Los Angeles; Thril Hill, New Jersey
- Genre: Rock
- Length: 51:20
- Label: Columbia
- Producer: Brendan O'Brien

Bruce Springsteen and the E Street Band chronology
Greatest Hits (2009)	Working on a Dream (2009)	The Promise (2010)

Bruce Springsteen chronology
Greatest Hits (2009)	Working on a Dream (2009)	The Promise (2010)

Singles from Working on a Dream
- 1. "Working on a Dream" Released: November 21, 2008; 2. "My Lucky Day" Released: November 28, 2008; 3. "The Wrestler" Released: December 16, 2008; 4. "What Love Can Do" Released: March 27, 2009

Working on a Dream is the sixteenth studio album by the American singer-songwriter Bruce Springsteen, released on January 27, 2009, through Columbia Records. It topped the charts in nine countries, including the US, where it was Springsteen's ninth No. 1. "The Wrestler", which appeared as a bonus track, won a Golden Globe award. E Street Band guitarist Steve Van Zandt said that Working on a Dream completed a trilogy which started with The Rising (2002) and continued with Magic (2007), all of which were produced by Brendan O'Brien.

== Background and recording ==
The album was officially announced, along with a track listing, on November 17, 2008. It emerged from work Springsteen and his band were doing as they completed Magic. "What Love Can Do" was written, in Springsteen's words, as a "love in the time of Bush" meditation, but felt like the start of something new rather than a candidate for Magic. Encouraged by Brendan O'Brien, Springsteen started work on a new album, and over the following week wrote "This Life," "My Lucky Day," "Life Itself," "Good Eye," and "Tomorrow Never Knows". These were recorded with the E Street Band during breaks on the Magic Tour, and, unusually for Springsteen, most were finished in just a few takes. He said, "I hope Working on a Dream has caught the energy of the band fresh off the road from some of the most exciting shows we've ever done." As with Magic, most of the tracks were first recorded with a core band comprising Springsteen, drummer Max Weinberg, bassist Garry Tallent, and pianist Roy Bittan; other members' contributions were added later. It was the last album to feature new work from founding E Street Band member Danny Federici, who died in April 2008. Federici's son Jason also contributes. The tracks vary in length from over eight minutes, for the opening track, "Outlaw Pete", to under three minutes. Steve Van Zandt said that Working on a Dream, The Rising and Magic work as a trilogy "in terms of sound, concept and writing style", and moved "toward the pop-rock form – this one more than the other two."

== Release ==
Springsteen first performed the title track, accompanied by Patti Scialfa, on November 2, 2008, in Cleveland during a show for Barack Obama's presidential campaign. An edited version was then broadcast during the November 16 NBC Sunday Night Football halftime broadcast. The single began airing on November 21, and was made available for free download via iTunes and the Sony BMG website on November 24. It entered the UK Singles Chart at No. 195 the following week. "My Lucky Day" was released in the US on Amazon on December 1. "Life Itself" was released as a free download on Amazon on December 28.

On January 12 the album was leaked onto the internet. A week later, NPR.org started streaming it free for a week, as did Sony BMG's Irish website. It went on sale in Germany and Ireland on January 23. An extensive promotional push included appearances at the Golden Globe Awards, Barack Obama's presidential inauguration, a new greatest hits album, the Super Bowl XLIII half-time show and an anticipated appearance at the 81st Academy Awards. The last of these went awry when, in what Rolling Stone termed "shocking news," "The Wrestler"—for which Springsteen had supplied the main song—was snubbed by the academy and failed to gain a nomination. Nevertheless, all the activity led Springsteen to say, "This has probably been the busiest month of my life." In February, an abbreviated version of "Working on a Dream" was included in the Super Bowl performance. That month, VH1 Classic aired the documentary, Bruce Springsteen: The Making Of 'Working On A Dream. The Working on a Dream Tour began on April 1.

== Critical reception ==
Professional ratings
Aggregate scores
Source	Rating
Metacritic	72/100
Review scores
Source	Rating
AllMusic	3/5 stars
Blender	3/5 stars
Chicago Tribune	2/4 stars
Entertainment Weekly	A
The Guardian	4/5 stars
NME	8/10
musicOMH	3.5/5 stars
Pitchfork	5.8/10
PopMatters	6/10
Rolling Stone	5/5 stars

Working on a Dream debuted at No. 1 on the Billboard 200 chart, but generated mixed reviews. Review aggregator Metacritic gave it 72 / 100, the lowest score of Springsteen's six albums released during the 2000s. The release of the initial tracks prompted The New York Times to welcome a "more hopeful, less bleak" Springsteen who had adopted "the voice of an honest striver redeemed by love and hard work". While Rolling Stone gave it a five-star rating and compared it to Born to Run in scale and ambition, Los Angeles Times writer Ann Powers suggested that the best that could be said of the album "is that it's boisterously scatterbrained, exhilaratingly bad." Greg Kot of The Chicago Tribune said it was at times a "silly" self-parody, but praised "the exuberant "My Lucky Day" and the gently uplifting title track". He identified "The Last Carnival" and "The Wrestler" as highlights, saying that they "represent Springsteen at close to the top of his game, and unintentionally reveal what much of the rest of the album lacks."

Pitchfork shared Van Zandt's assessment of the album being "the final installment of a trilogy [Springsteen] began with The Rising in 2002 and continued with Magic in 2007". Writing in The Guardian, Richard Williams notes that "the musical trademarks of the E Street Band are outnumbered by adventures into areas not previously associated with Springsteen". These include a string orchestra, Beach Boys harmonies, jangling Byrds-like guitars and an "I Am the Walrus"-style fadeout. Listeners agreed, considering it to be one of Springsteen's most stylistically diverse efforts. Critics noted echoes of Wall of Sound, girl group and British Invasion-era Top 40. The album also recalls some of Springsteen's earlier work, with "The Last Carnival" being seen as a sequel to "Wild Billy's Circus Story" from 1973's The Wild, the Innocent & the E Street Shuffle.

Working on a Dream sold 224,000 copies in its first week, ending a seven-week continuous chart-topping run by Taylor Swift's Fearless. It was Springsteen's ninth number one album in the United States. This tied him with The Rolling Stones for the fourth-highest total in that regard; only the Beatles (with 19), Jay-Z (with 11), and Elvis Presley (with 10) had more. Working on a Dream also debuted at number 1 on the Billboard Top Rock Albums chart, Top Digital Albums chart, and Top Internet Albums chart. It had sold more than 3 million copies worldwide, with over 585,000 in the US, as of September 2010.

== Track listing ==
All tracks are written by Bruce Springsteen.

No.	Title	Length
1.	"Outlaw Pete"	8:00
2.	"My Lucky Day"	4:01
3.	"Working on a Dream"	3:30
4.	"Queen of the Supermarket"	4:40
5.	"What Love Can Do"	2:57
6.	"This Life"	4:30
7.	"Good Eye"	3:01
8.	"Tomorrow Never Knows"	2:14
9.	"Life Itself"	4:00
10.	"Kingdom of Days"	4:02
11.	"Surprise, Surprise"	3:24
12.	"The Last Carnival"	3:11

Bonus Track
No.	Title	Length
13.	"The Wrestler"	3:50

=== Bonus tracks and outtakes ===
"The Wrestler" first appeared in August 2008 at the 65th Venice International Film Festival debut of the film The Wrestler, and was nominated for the Golden Globe Award for Best Original Song, which it went on to win at the 66th Golden Globe Awards on January 11. The album version, without the end-credits string introduction, became available on iTunes on December 16, ahead of the film's opening in major US cities.

"A Night with the Jersey Devil" first appeared in October 2008 on Springsteen's website, accompanied by a Halloween-themed music video. But subsequent press releases omitted mention of it, and Springsteen sources confirmed it had been removed, for reasons unknown. The song was announced by eil.com to be included as the 14th track on the Japanese CD edition on the album, but the current track list does not include it. The video, however, is featured in the DVD included with the album's deluxe edition (as listed below).

"Frankie Fell in Love" was recorded during the album sessions but not released, being later reworked for the 2014 album, High Hopes.

=== Deluxe edition ===
Includes the full CD plus a DVD featuring:

1. "The Sessions DVD"
  - A 38-minute documentary showing behind-the-scenes footage of the recording of the album. Produced, directed, and edited by Thom Zimny, it includes studio footage edited to the tracks of "My Lucky Day," "Queen of the Supermarket," "Kingdom of Days," "Working on a Dream," "Life Itself" and "The Last Carnival." It also contains demos and early band versions of the songs as they were worked up.
2. "A Night with the Jersey Devil" (Springsteen, Robert Jones, Gene Vincent) – 3:23

== Outlaw Pete graphic novel ==
In November 2014, Springsteen released a graphic novel titled Outlaw Pete which is based on the opening track from Working on a Dream.

== Personnel ==
- Bruce Springsteen – lead vocals, guitar, harmonica, keyboards, percussion, glockenspiel

The E Street Band

- Roy Bittan – piano, organ, accordion
- Clarence Clemons – saxophone, vocals
- Danny Federici – organ
- Nils Lofgren – guitar, vocals
- Patti Scialfa – vocals
- Garry Tallent – bass
- Steven Van Zandt – guitar, vocals
- Max Weinberg – drums

Additional musicians

- Soozie Tyrell – violin, vocals
- Patrick Warren – organ, piano, keyboards (tracks 1, 6, 8)
- Jason Federici – accordion (track 12)

Technical

- Brendan O'Brien – production, mixing
- Nick DiDia – recording
- Billy Bowers – additional engineering
- Tom Tapley, Darren Tablan – recording and mixing assistants
- Rick Kwan – additional recording assistant
- Tom Syrowski, Toby Scott – recording engineers
- Tim Mitchell, Kevin Mills, Derek Karlquist, Paul Lamalfa – recording assistians
- Bob Ludwig – mastering
- Edward Horst – string and horn arrangements (tracks 1, 8, 10, 11)
- Patti Horst, Shari Sutcliffe – contractors
- Michelle Holme, Dave Bett, Chris Austopchuk – art direction, design
- Danny Clinch – cover photo, band portraits
- Jennifer Tzar – other photos

== Charts ==
=== Weekly charts ===
Weekly chart performance for Working on a Dream
Chart (2009)	Peak position
Australian Albums (ARIA)	3
Austrian Albums (Ö3 Austria)	1
Belgian Albums (Ultratop Flanders)	1
Belgian Albums (Ultratop Wallonia)	2
Canadian Albums (Billboard)	1
Croatian International Albums (IFPI)	1
Danish Albums (Hitlisten)	1
Dutch Albums (Album Top 100)	1
Finnish Albums (Suomen virallinen lista)	1
French Albums (SNEP)	2
German Albums (Offizielle Top 100)	1
Greek Albums (IFPI)	1
Hungarian Albums (MAHASZ)	2
Irish Albums (IRMA)	1
Italian Albums (FIMI)	1
Japanese Albums (Oricon)	17
New Zealand Albums (RMNZ)	1
Norwegian Albums (VG-lista)	1
Polish Albums (OLiS)	8
Portuguese Albums (AFP)	5
Scottish Albums (Official Charts)	1
Spanish Albums (Promusicae)	1
Swedish Albums (Sverigetopplistan)	1
Swiss Albums (Schweizer Hitparade)	1
UK Albums (Official Charts)	1
US Billboard 200	1
US Top Rock Albums (Billboard)	1
US Indie Store Album Sales (Billboard)	1

=== Year-end charts ===
2009 year-end chart performance for Working on a Dream
Chart (2009)	Position
Australian Albums (ARIA)	100
Austrian Albums (Ö3 Austria)	30
Belgian Albums (Ultratop Flanders)	33
Belgian Albums (Ultratop Wallonia)	61
Canadian Albums (Billboard)	42
Dutch Albums (Album Top 100)	18
French Albums (SNEP)	81
German Albums (Offizielle Top 100)	27
Swedish Albums (Sverigetopplistan)	7
Swiss Albums (Schweizer Hitparade)	30
UK Albums (OCC)	76
US Billboard 200	57
US Top Rock Albums (Billboard)	17

== Certifications ==
Certifications and sales for Working on a Dream
Region	Certification	Certified units/sales
Austria (IFPI Austria)	Gold	10,000^{*}
Belgium (BRMA)	Gold	15,000^{*}
Canada (Music Canada)	Platinum	80,000^{^}
Denmark (IFPI Danmark)	Platinum	30,000^{^}
Finland (Musiikkituottajat)	Gold	12,410
Germany (BVMI)	Gold	100,000^{^}
Ireland (IRMA)	2× Platinum	30,000^{^}
Italy (FIMI)	Platinum	70,000^{*}
Netherlands (NVPI)	Gold	30,000^{^}
Spain (Promusicae)	Platinum	80,000^{^}
Sweden (GLF)	Platinum	40,000^{^}
Switzerland (IFPI Switzerland)	Gold	15,000^{^}
United Kingdom (BPI)	Gold	100,000^{*}
United States (RIAA)	Gold	500,000^{^}
^{*} Sales figures based on certification alone.^{^} Shipments figures based on certification alone.
