= Mary Jane (Janis Joplin song) =

"Mary Jane" is a blues song by Janis Joplin.

The song has five verses; the first includes the line "When I bring home my hard-earned pay, I spend my money all on Mary Jane".

A live performance of the song, recorded in San Francisco 1965 with the Dick Oxtot Jazz Band, is on the 1975 compilation album Janis. The song is also included on the 2007 compilation The Very Best Of Janis Joplin.

The song is often incorrectly attributed to Bessie Smith.
