= Outlaw Pete =

Book by Bruce Springsteen

- Cover photo of the book
- Author: Bruce Springsteen
- Illustrator: Frank Caruso
- Cover artist: Frank Caruso
- Language: English
- Genre: Graphic novel
- Publisher: Simon & Schuster
- Publication date: November 4, 2014
- Media type: Paperback; E-book
- Pages: 56 pages
- ISBN: 978-1501103858

Outlaw Pete is a 2014 book by Bruce Springsteen, with artwork by Frank Caruso, based on the song of the same name from Springsteen's album, Working on a Dream.

Outlaw Pete is about a bank-robbing baby whose exploits become a meditation on sin, fate, and free will. According to Springsteen, "Outlaw Pete is essentially the story of a man trying to outlive and outlast his sins." The story came from many sources, including the many colorful characters on his album The Wild, the Innocent & the E Street Shuffle, every western he had seen since he was a kid, and bedtime stories of Brave Cowboy Bill his mother used to recite to him as a child.

"Outlaw Pete"

Song by Bruce Springsteen

from the album Working on a Dream
- Released: January 27, 2009
- Recorded: 2007–2008
- Genre: Rock
- Length: 8:00
- Label: Columbia
- Songwriter: Bruce Springsteen
- Producer: Brendan O'Brien
