= What Good Can Drinkin' Do =

Janis Joplin song

Song by Janis Joplin

from the album Janis
- Released: 1975
- Recorded: Between c. 1962 - c. 1963
- Genre: Blues
- Length: 2:41
- Label: Columbia
- Songwriter(s): Janis Joplin

"What Good Can Drinkin' Do" is a blues song by Janis Joplin, considered the first song she ever recorded.

The song has six verses, in a 12-bar blues pattern. Lyrics in the first and last verse are almost identical: "What good can drinkin' do ?" is sung twice, then answered with "Lord, I drink all night but the next day I still feel blue."

Recordings of Joplin performing the song can be heard on the 1975 compilation album Janis, and on the 1993 box set Janis. Record Collector cites her intro to the song: Up steps a feisty young woman, one month short of her twentieth birthday. "Uh, this is a song called 'What Good Can Drinkin' Do', that I wrote one night after drinkin' myself into a stupor." ...

Austin musician Carolyn Wonderland began featuring the song in live performances after appearing in the November 2009 tribute concert "Kozmic Blues: The Life and Music of Janis Joplin," part of the American Music Masters series presented by the Rock and Roll Hall of Fame and Museum. Wonderland later included the song on her 2011 album Peace Meal.
