= Knock on Wood (Eddie Floyd album) =

Studio album by Eddie Floyd
- Released: January 26, 1967
- Recorded: July–December 1966; Stax Recording Studios (Memphis, Tennessee)
- Genre: Memphis soul; Southern R&B
- Length: 34:55
- Label: Stax; S-714
- Producer: Jim Stewart

Eddie Floyd chronology
Knock on Wood (1967)	Looking Back (1968)

Singles from Knock on Wood
- 1. "Knock on Wood" Released: July 25, 1966; 2. "Raise Your Hand" Released: January 11, 1967

Professional ratings
Review scores
Source	Rating
AllMusic	4/5 stars
Mojo	(favorable)

Knock on Wood is the debut album of soul singer/songwriter Eddie Floyd, released in 1967 on Stax Records. The album was recorded between July and December 1966 at Stax Recording Studio. It features his most well-known single, the title track, "Knock on Wood".

== Track listing ==
1. "Knock on Wood" (Steve Cropper, Floyd) – 3:05
2. "Something You Got" (Chris Kenner, Fats Domino) – 3:05
3. "But It's Alright" (J.J. Jackson, Pierre Tubbs) – 2:53
4. "I Stand Accused" (Billy Butler, Jerry Butler) – 3:21
5. "If You Gotta Make a Fool of Somebody" (Rudy Clark)– 2:46
6. "I Don't Want to Cry" (Luther Dixon, Chuck Jackson) – 2:50
7. "Raise Your Hand" (Cropper, Floyd, Alvertis Isbell) – 2:26
8. "Got to Make a Comeback" (Floyd, Joe Shamwell) – 2:40
9. "634-5789" (Cropper, Floyd) – 3:03
10. "I've Just Been Feeling Bad" (Cropper, Floyd) – 2:42
11. "High-Heel Sneakers" (Robert Higginbotham) – 2:43
12. "Warm and Tender Love" (Bobby Robinson) – 3:32

== Chart and single history ==
Title	Information
"Knock on Wood"	Stax Single 194, 1966; B-side: "Got to Make a Comeback"; US Pop Singles #28; US Black Singles #1
"Raise Your Hand"	Stax single 208, 1967; B-side: "I've Just Been Feeling Bad"; US Pop Singles #79; US Black Singles #16

== Personnel ==
- Eddie Floyd – vocals
- Booker T. Jones – piano, organ
- Isaac Hayes – piano
- Steve Cropper – guitar
- Donald Dunn – bass guitar
- Al Jackson Jr. – drums
- Wayne Jackson – trumpet
- Andrew Love – tenor saxophone
- Floyd Newman – baritone saxophone
