= Working on a Dream (song) =

Single by Bruce Springsteen

from the album Working on a Dream
- Released: November 21, 2008
- Genre: Rock
- Length: 3:31
- Label: Columbia
- Songwriter: Bruce Springsteen
- Producer: Brendan O'Brien

Bruce Springsteen singles chronology
| "Dream Baby Dream" (2008) | "Working on a Dream" (2008) | "My Lucky Day" (2008) |

Music video
- Working on a Dream on Youtube.com

"Working on a Dream" is a song by Bruce Springsteen, released in 2008 as the title track and first single from his sixteenth studio album of the same name (2009). It won the Grammy Award for Best Rock Vocal Performance, Solo at the 52nd Annual Grammy Awards.

== History ==
The song's sunny lyric develops what Rolling Stone called "a rare and timely moment of unabashed optimism" for Springsteen, possibly connected to the impending arrival of the Barack Obama administration:

I'm working on a dream,
Though sometimes it feel so far away ...
I'm working on a dream,
And I know it will be mine someday.

The title phrase is present in both the verses and chorus, and occurs some twenty times altogether in the song. The arrangement is mid-tempo, propelled by an acoustic guitar with organ and electric guitar washes throughout; the glossy Brendan O'Brien production also features partly submerged "la-la" backing vocals. The instrumental break features Springsteen whistling against a bariton sax line.

"Working on a Dream" was first performed during Springsteen's November 2, 2008, appearance in Cleveland for Barack Obama's 2008 presidential campaign, in an acoustic performance accompanied by Patti Scialfa. A chopped-up airing of the recorded version first appeared during the November 16 NBC Sunday Night Football broadcast at halftime.

The intact "Working on a Dream" began airing on radio stations and their websites on November 21, 2008, and was made available for free download via iTunes and the Sony BMG website on November 24. The track entered the UK Singles Chart at position 195 the following week. A music video appeared on some foreign sites showing the recording of the song. The song was a big hit on the American Triple-A Charts, peaking at No. 2, blocked only by "Get On Your Boots" by U2.

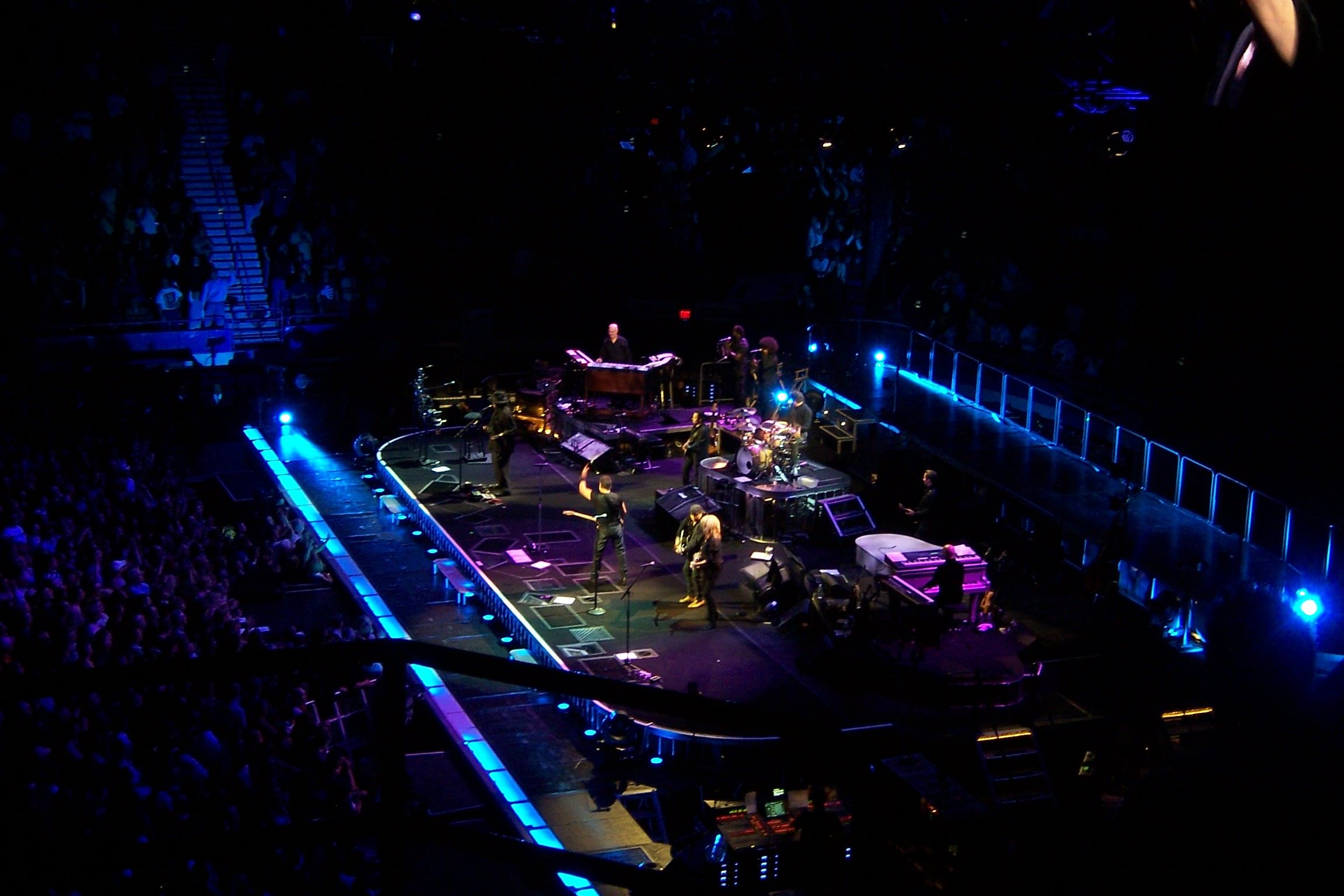
Deep blue stage lighting matched the album cover's look and feel during a Working on a Dream Tour performance of the title song; the band looks on as Clarence Clemons does the whistling break. Hartford Civic Center, April 24, 2009.

"Working on a Dream" had its first E Street Band performance on February 1, 2009, when it was included as part of Springsteen's halftime show during Super Bowl XLIII. This abbreviated rendition featured a full choir backing Springsteen, Scialfa, and Steve Van Zandt delivering the vocals from a pit stage in front of the main stage. Days later, during the Grammy Awards of 2009, Coldplay singer Chris Martin dropped the title phrase into the group's performance of "Viva La Vida".

When the 2009 Working on a Dream Tour began, the song became one of the surprisingly few selections from the album to be included in the show. Augmenting for the tour backing vocalists Curtis King and Cindy Mizelle (two veterans of the Sessions Band Tour) had a significant role to play in the vocal layering, and saxophonist Clarence Clemons performed the whistling break in the middle of the song. Three minutes in, Springsteen inserted a modified version of this "Build a House" stage speech that had been developed during the prior Magic Tour.

== Charts ==
=== Weekly charts ===
Weekly chart performance for "Working on a Dream"
| Chart (2009) | Peak Position |
|---|---|
| Belgium (Ultratip Bubbling Under Flanders) | 14 |
| Belgium (Ultratop 50 Wallonia) | 48 |
| Canada Hot 100 (Billboard) | 91 |
| Netherlands (Single Top 100) | 65 |
| Italy (Musica e Dischi) | 26 |
| Norway (VG-lista) | 9 |
| Sweden (Sverigetopplistan) | 37 |
| Switzerland (Schweizer Hitparade) | 31 |
| US Billboard Hot 100 | 95 |
| US Adult Alternative Airplay (Billboard) | 2 |

=== Year-end charts ===
Year-end chart performance for "Working on a Dream"
| Chart (2009) | Position |
|---|---|
| Hungary (Rádiós TOP 100) | 171 |
