= Janis (1975 album) =

Compilation album by Janis Joplin
- Released: 1975
- Recorded: 1963–1970
- Genre: Blues rock
- Label: Columbia
- Producer: Paul A. Rothchild

Janis Joplin chronology
Janis Joplin's Greatest Hits (1973)	Janis (1975)	Farewell Song (1982)

Professional ratings
Review scores
Source	Rating
Christgau's Record Guide	C+

Janis is a collection of performances by Janis Joplin, issued in 1975 as a compilation album containing film soundtrack and live recordings. Disc one is subtitled "From the soundtrack of the motion picture Janis (with substituted performances of 'Piece of my Heart' and 'Cry Baby')". In addition to concert recordings from Toronto and Frankfurt, there are several short TV-interviews. Disc two contains recordings from Austin, Texas (1963 and 1964), plus four recordings from San Francisco (1965). The album booklet contains a photo documentary, with 22 pictures from Janis Joplin's life and career.

== Track listing ==
=== Disc one: Janis ===
1. "Mercedes Benz" (Janis Joplin, Michael McClure) (With The Full Tilt Boogie Band; from the album Pearl)
2. "Ball and Chain" (W. M. Thornton) (With The Kozmic Blues Band; Frankfurt, Germany Concert 1969)
3. Rap on "Try" (Toronto, Canada Concert 1970)
4. "Try (Just a Little Bit Harder)" (Jerry Ragovoy, C. Taylor) (With Full Tilt Boogie; Toronto, Canada Concert 1970)
5. "Summertime" (DuBose Heyward, George Gershwin) (With The Kozmic Blues Band; Frankfurt, Germany Concert 1969)
6. Albert Hall Interview (1969)
7. "Cry Baby" (Jerry Ragovoy, Bert Berns) (With The Full Tilt Boogie Band; from the album Pearl)
8. "Move Over" (J. Joplin) (With The Full Tilt Boogie Band)
9. Dick Cavett T.V. Interview (1970)
10. "Piece of My Heart" (Jerry Ragovoy, Bert Berns) (With Big Brother and the Holding Company; from the album Cheap Thrills)
11. Port Arthur High School Reunion
12. "Maybe" (R. Barrett) (With The Kozmic Blues Band; Frankfurt, Germany Concert 1969)
13. "Me and Bobby McGee" (Fred Foster, Kris Kristofferson) (With The Full Tilt Boogie Band; from the album Pearl)

=== Disc two: Early Performances ===
1. "Trouble in Mind" (Richard M. Jones) (Austin, Texas 1963 or 1964)
2. "What Good Can Drinkin' Do" (Janis Joplin) (Austin, Texas 1963 or 1964)
3. "Silver Threads and Golden Needles" (J. Rhodes, D. Reynolds) (Austin, Texas 1963 or 1964)
4. "Mississippi River" (Austin, Texas 1963 or 1964)
5. "Stealin'" (L. Stock, A. Lewis) (Austin, Texas 1963 or 1964)
6. "No Reason For Livin'" (Janis Joplin) (Austin, Texas 1963 or 1964)
7. "Black Mountain Blues" (R. Cole) (Recorded 1965 San Francisco with Dick Oxtot Jazz Band)
8. "Walk Right In" (Gus Cannon, H. Woods) (Recorded 1965 San Francisco with Dick Oxtot Jazz Band)
9. "River Jordan" (Recorded 1965 San Francisco with Dick Oxtot Jazz Band)
10. "Mary Jane" (Janis Joplin) (Recorded 1965 San Francisco with Dick Oxtot Jazz Band)
11. "Kansas City Blues" (C. Parker) (Austin, Texas 1963 or 1964)
12. "Daddy, Daddy, Daddy" (Janis Joplin) (Austin, Texas 1963 or 1964)
13. "See See Rider" (Ma Rainey) (Austin, Texas 1963 or 1964)
14. "San Francisco Bay Blues" (Jesse Fuller) (Austin, Texas 1963 or 1964)
15. "Winin' Boy" (Jelly Roll Morton) (Austin, Texas 1963 or 1964)
16. "Careless Love" (Huddie Ledbetter, Alan Lomax) (Austin, Texas 1963 or 1964)
17. "I'll Drown In My Own Tears" (Henry Glover) (Austin, Texas 1963 or 1964)

== Charts ==
Chart (1975)	Peak position
Australia (Kent Music Report)	36

== Certifications ==
According to RIAA.COM, the 1975 release did not sell 500,000 copies. The 1993 release did. Two different albums.
