= Raise Your Hand =

Single by Eddie Floyd

from the album Knock on Wood
- B-side: "I've Just Been Feeling Bad"
- Released: January 11, 1967
- Recorded: 1966
- Length: 4:55
- Label: Stax
- Songwriters: Steve Cropper; Eddie Floyd; Alvertis Isbell

Eddie Floyd singles chronology
"Knock on Wood" (1966)	"Raise Your Hand" (1967)	"Don't Rock the Boat" (1967)

"Raise Your Hand" is a song written by Steve Cropper, Eddie Floyd, and Alvertis Isbell (Al Bell). It was recorded by Floyd and appeared on his 1967 debut album Knock on Wood. It was released as a single that year, where it reached #16 on the Black Singles Chart and #79 on the Pop Singles Chart.

== Track listing ==
"Raise Your Hand" track listing
No.	Title	Writer(s)	Length
1.	"Raise Your Hand"	Steve Cropper; Eddie Floyd; Alvertis Isbell	2:20
2.	"I've Just Been Feeling Bad"	Cropper; Floyd	2:35
Total length:			4:55

== Chart performance ==
Chart (1967)	Peak position
Canada (RPM)	74
UK Singles (The Official Charts Company)	42
US Billboard Hot 100	79
US Billboard Top Selling R&B Singles	16

== Other versions ==
- The song was part of Janis Joplin's concert repertoire and was performed by her at the 1969 Woodstock Festival. Her rendition of the song later appeared on the 1993 compilation Janis.
- It was also played by the J. Geils Band, and appeared on their 1976 live album Blow Your Face Out.
- Ike & Tina Turner recorded a version of the song in the early 1970s which was released on the 1985 compilation album Golden Empire.
- The song has long been a favorite of Bruce Springsteen and the E Street Band for several decades and a 1978 performance of it was included on their Live/1975–85 box set.
- A version of the song appeared on Clarence Clemons and Temple of Soul's 2004 album Live in Asbury Park, Vol. 2 featuring Bruce Springsteen on lead guitar and lead vocals.
