= − Tour =

2023 concert tour by Ed Sheeran

- Tour by Ed Sheeran
- Promotional poster
- Location: Europe; North America
- Associated album: −
- Start date: 23 March 2023
- End date: 22 September 2023
- Legs: 4
- No. of shows: 29
- Supporting acts: Cian Ducrot; Ben Kweller

Ed Sheeran concert chronology
- +−=÷× Tour (2022–25); − Tour (2023); Loop Tour (2025–2026)

The − Tour (pronounced Subtract Tour) was the fifth concert tour by the English singer-songwriter Ed Sheeran. Comprising 29 shows across four legs, the tour commenced on 23 March 2023 in Manchester, England, and concluded on 22 September 2023 in Los Angeles, California. The tour supported Sheeran's sixth studio album, −, which was released on 5 May 2023.

== Background ==
When announcing the tour on social media, Sheeran said, "I'm playing some smaller theatre shows in the US this summer, so I can play Subtract the entire way through with full band in an intimate setting." The shows on this tour were meant to supplement his shows for the simultaneously ongoing +−=÷× Tour. The latter were staged in large stadiums and arenas, and involved songs drawn from all of Sheeran's mathematics studio albums, while, conversely, the shows on this tour focused mostly on songs from − (2023).

Because this tour was performed in smaller, more intimate venues, between songs Sheeran explained to the audience how 2022 had been a difficult year for him. He discussed the death of his close friend Jamal Edwards, and how he felt when learning that his wife Cherry Seaborn had been diagnosed with a tumour while pregnant with their second daughter.

== Set list ==
The following set list is obtained from the 19 May 2023 in Clearwater, Florida. It does not represent all dates throughout the tour.

1. "Boat"
2. "Salt Water"
3. "Eyes Closed"
4. "Life Goes On"
5. "Dusty"
6. "End of Youth"
7. "Colourblind"
8. "Curtains"
9. "Borderline"
10. "Spark"
11. "Vega"
12. "Sycamore"
13. "No Strings"
14. "The Hills of Aberfeldy"
15. "The A Team"
16. "Shivers"
17. "Thinking Out Loud"
18. "Perfect"
19. "Bloodstream"
20. "Shape of You"
21. "Bad Habits"
22. "The Parting Glass"
23. "Afterglow"

== Tour dates ==
List of 2023 concerts, showing date, city, country, venue, opening act, tickets sold, number of available tickets and amount of gross revenue
Date (2023)	City	Country	Venue	Opening act(s)	Attendance	Revenue
23 March	Manchester	England	AO Arena	Cian Ducrot	14,752 / 14,885	$1,589,755
24 March	London	England	The O_{2} Arena	Cian Ducrot	36,013 / 36,456	$3,861,670
25 March	London	England	The O_{2} Arena	Cian Ducrot	36,013 / 36,456	$3,861,670
27 March	London	England	Eventim Apollo	—N/a	2,742 / 2,742	$293,778
28 March	Glasgow	Scotland	OVO Hydro	—N/a	12,356 / 14,049	$1,332,593
30 March	Dublin	Ireland	3Arena	—N/a	12,912 / 12,991	$1,396,685
2 April	Paris	France	Accor Arena	Cian Ducrot	16,076 / 16,106	$1,706,182
10 April	New York City	United States	Kings Theatre	Ed Sheeran	2,946 / 3,055	$319,806
15 April (Note: Surprise pop-up show.)	Madrid	Spain	Círculo de Bellas Artes	—N/a	—N/a	—N/a
16 April	Milan	Italy	Fabrique	—N/a	—N/a	—N/a
17 April	Berlin	Germany	Admiralspalast	—N/a	1,591 / 1,595	$174,632
5 May	New York City	United States	Wooster Street	—N/a	—N/a	—N/a
6 May	Dallas	United States	Commerce Street	—N/a	—N/a	—N/a
7 May	West Hollywood	United States	Melrose Avenue	—N/a	—N/a	—N/a
19 May	Clearwater	United States	Ruth Eckerd Hall	Ben Kweller	2,101 / 2,101	$237,413
26 May	Atlanta	United States	Tabernacle	Ben Kweller	—N/a	—N/a
2 June	Philadelphia	United States	The Met Philadelphia	Ben Kweller	—N/a	—N/a
16 June	Toronto	Canada	History	Ben Kweller	—N/a	—N/a
29 June	Boston	United States	Wang Theatre	Ben Kweller	3,461 / 3,503	$342,205
14 July	Royal Oak	United States	Royal Oak Music Theatre	Sam Barber	—N/a	—N/a
21 July	Nashville	United States	Ryman Auditorium	Ben Kweller	2,233 / 2,233	$243,530
28 July	Chicago	United States	Chicago Theatre	Ben Kweller	3,553 / 3,553	$334,566
11 August	Minneapolis	United States	State Theatre	Ben Kweller	—N/a	—N/a
14 August	Amagansett	United States	Stephen Talkhouse (Note: Exclusive show for SiriusXM subscribers)	Ben Kweller	—N/a	—N/a
18 August	Denver	United States	Paramount Theatre	Ben Kweller	—N/a	—N/a
25 August	Seattle	United States	Paramount Theatre	Brandy Clark	2,761 / 2,761	$290,841
1 September	Vancouver	Canada	Queen Elizabeth Theatre	Ben Kweller	—N/a	—N/a
15 September	Oakland	United States	Fox Oakland Theatre	Ben Kweller	—N/a	—N/a
22 September	Los Angeles	United States	Shrine Auditorium	Ben Kweller	—N/a	—N/a
Total					113,497 / 116,030 (98%)	$12,123,656
