= +−=÷× Tour =

2022–2025 concert tour by Ed Sheeran

- Tour by Ed Sheeran
- Promotional poster
- Location: Asia; Europe; North America; Oceania; South America
- Associated albums: =; −
- Start date: 23 April 2022
- End date: 7 September 2025
- No. of shows: 182
- Supporting acts: Armaan Malik; Ben&Ben; Budjerah; Busted; Calum Scott; Cat Burns; Denise Chaila; Dino Jelusick; DOT; Dylan; Griff; James Blunt; John Mayer; Jonita Gandhi; Khalid; Kayan; Kaylee Bell; Little Big Town; Lisa Mishra; Mali; Maisie Peters; Myles Smith; Prateek Kuhad; Rebellions Bhutan; Rosa Linn; Russ; Tori Kelly; Zeyne
- Attendance: 8.8 million
- Box office: $875.7 million

Ed Sheeran concert chronology
- ÷ Tour (2017–2019); +−=÷× Tour (2022–2025); − Tour (2023)

The +−=÷× Tour (pronounced The Mathematics Tour) was the fourth concert tour by the English singer-songwriter Ed Sheeran. It began in Dublin, Ireland, on 23 April 2022, and concluded in Düsseldorf, Germany, on 7 September 2025. The +−=÷× Tour was designed as a tribute to Sheeran's math symbol studio albums. Spanning 188 shows across five continents, it became the fourth highest-grossing tour of all time with $875.7 million in ticket sales and the fourth highest-attended tour of all time with 8.8 million tickets sold.

Sheeran's shows at the Melbourne Cricket Ground broke the record for the highest ticketed attendance at an Australian concert with 108,000 on 2 March 2023 and 110,000 the next day. His five Wembley Stadium concerts in 2022 became one of the most-attended multi-night engagement shows with over 420,000 tickets sold. Sheeran also broke the SoFi Stadium's one-day ticket record, performing to over 81,000 fans. Dating back to his first reported concert in 2012, Sheeran grossed over $1.7 billion from 18.9 million tickets sold and became one of the 10 highest grossing and bestselling acts in boxscore history.

== Background ==
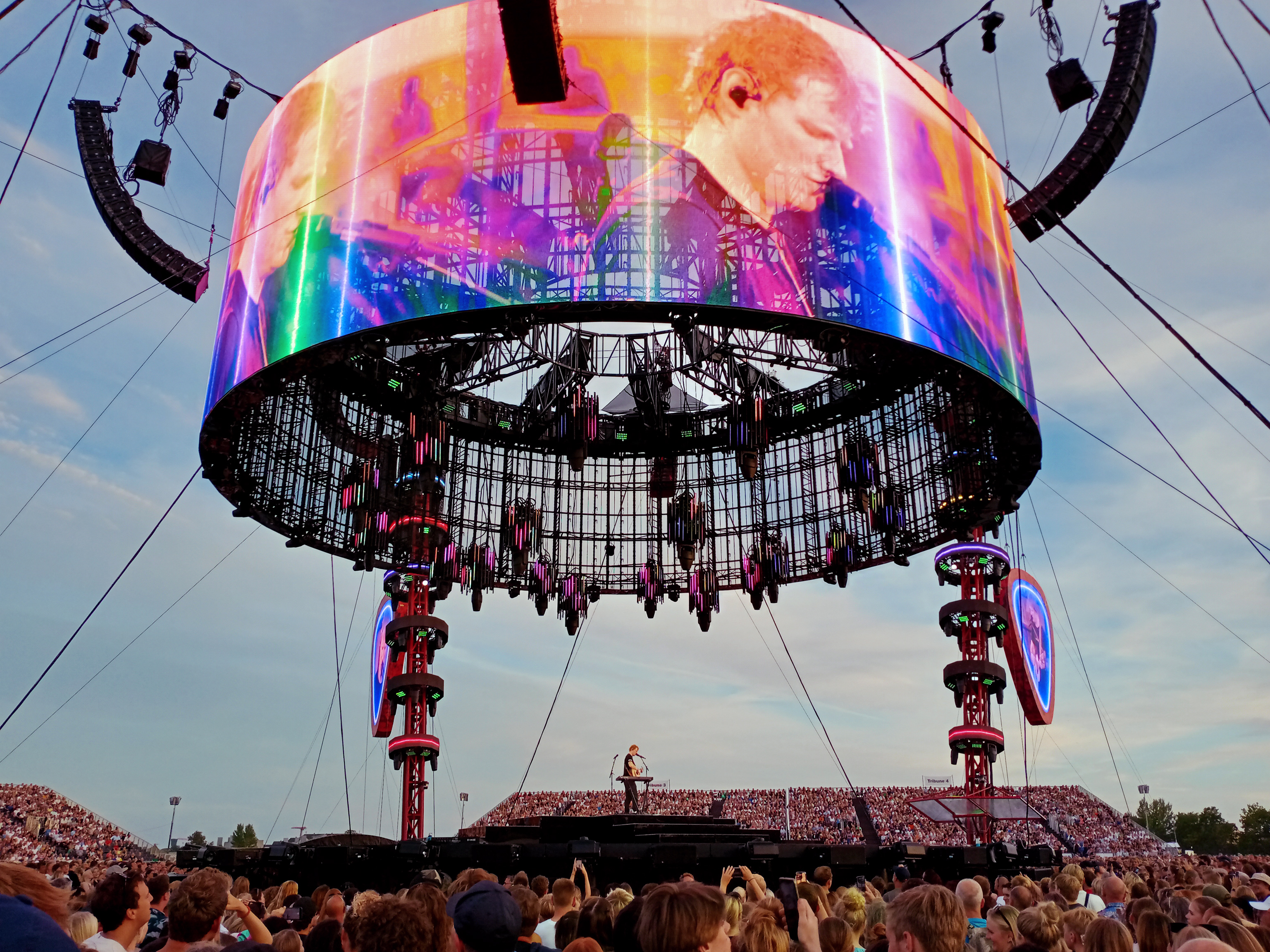
Sheeran at Øresundsparken in Copenhagen on 3 August 2022

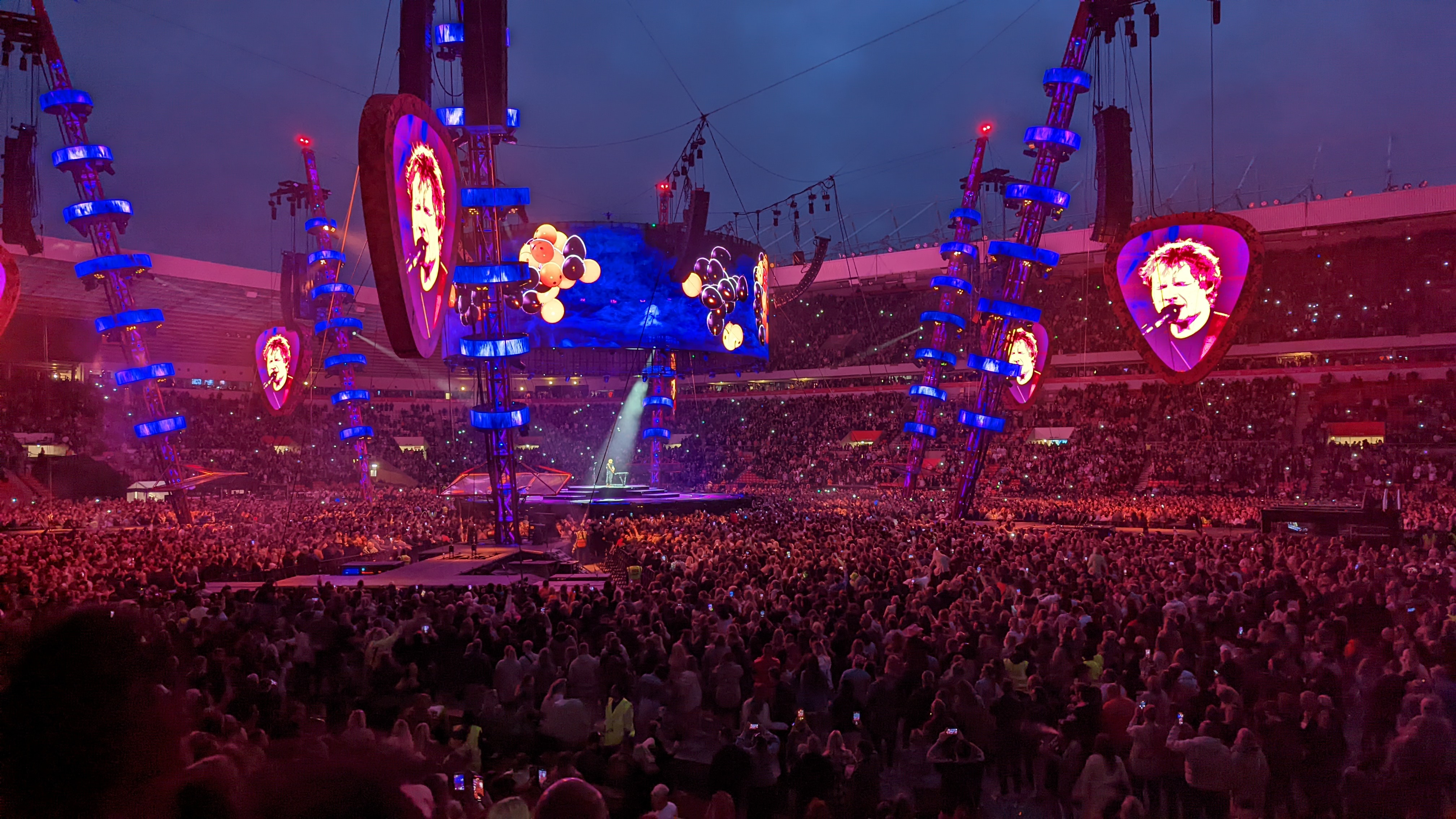
Sheeran at the Stadium of Light in Sunderland on 3 June 2022

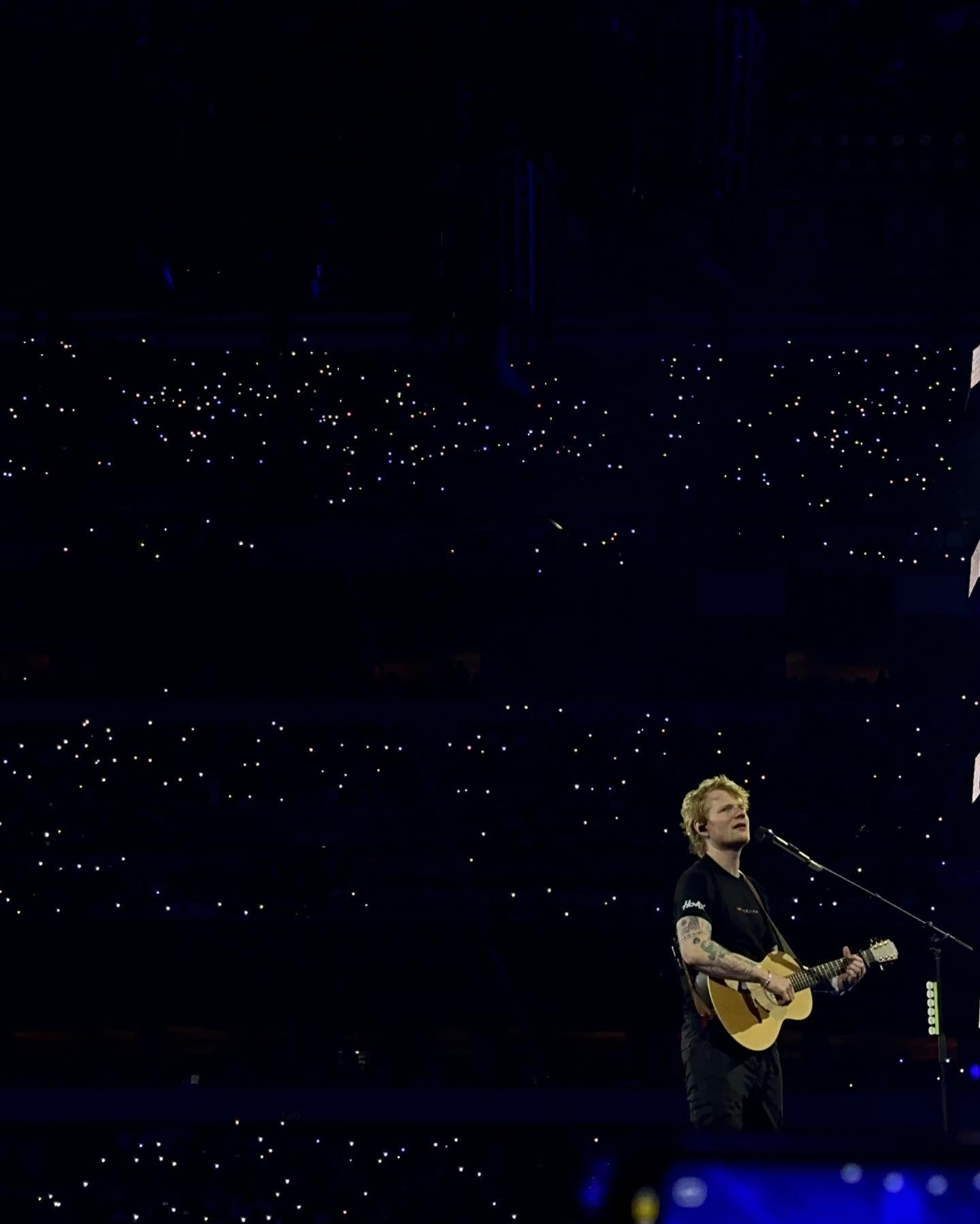
Sheeran at the Lincoln Financial Field in Philadelphia on 3 June 2023

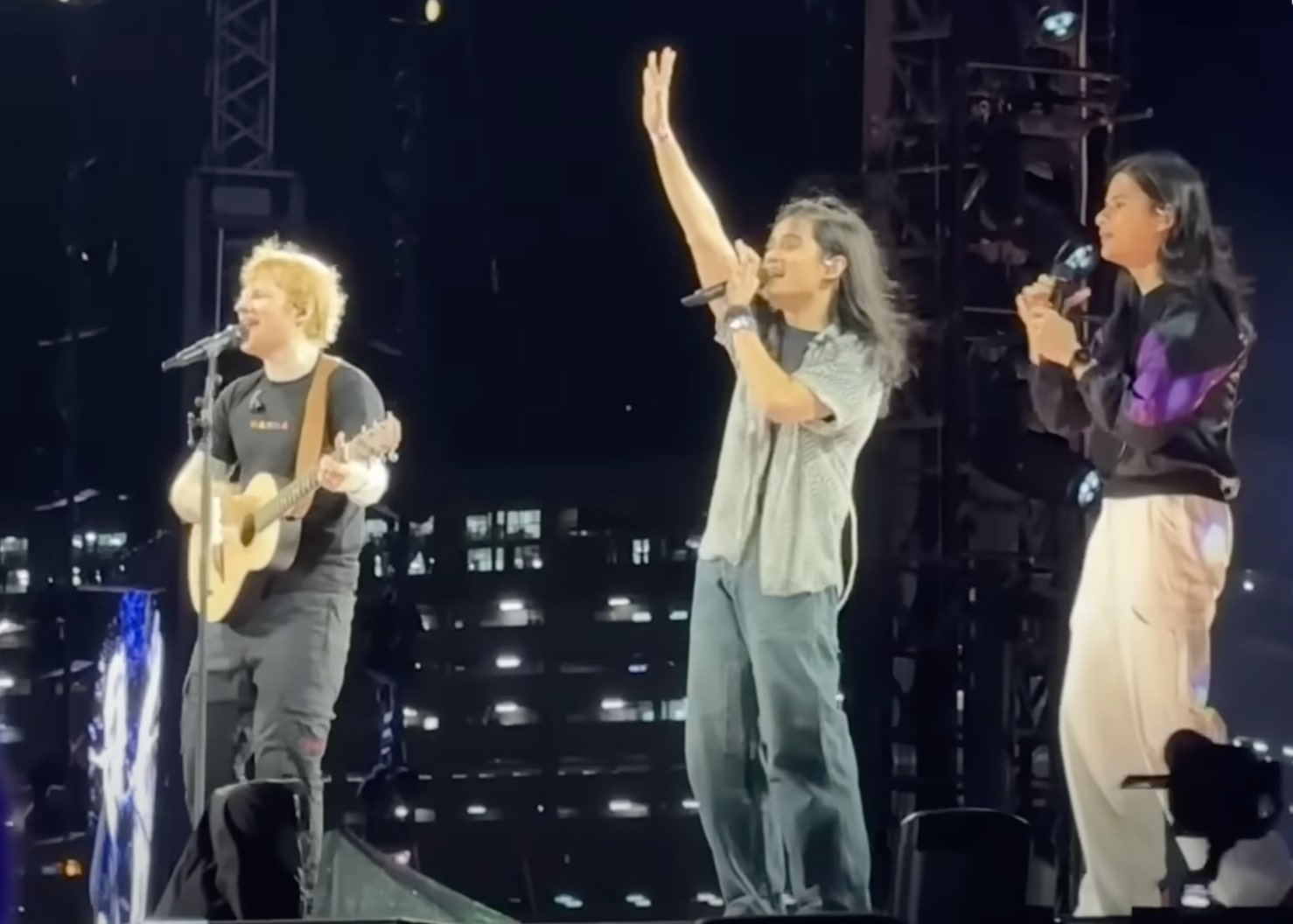
Sheeran with Ben&Ben at the SMDC Festival Grounds in Manila on 9 March 2024

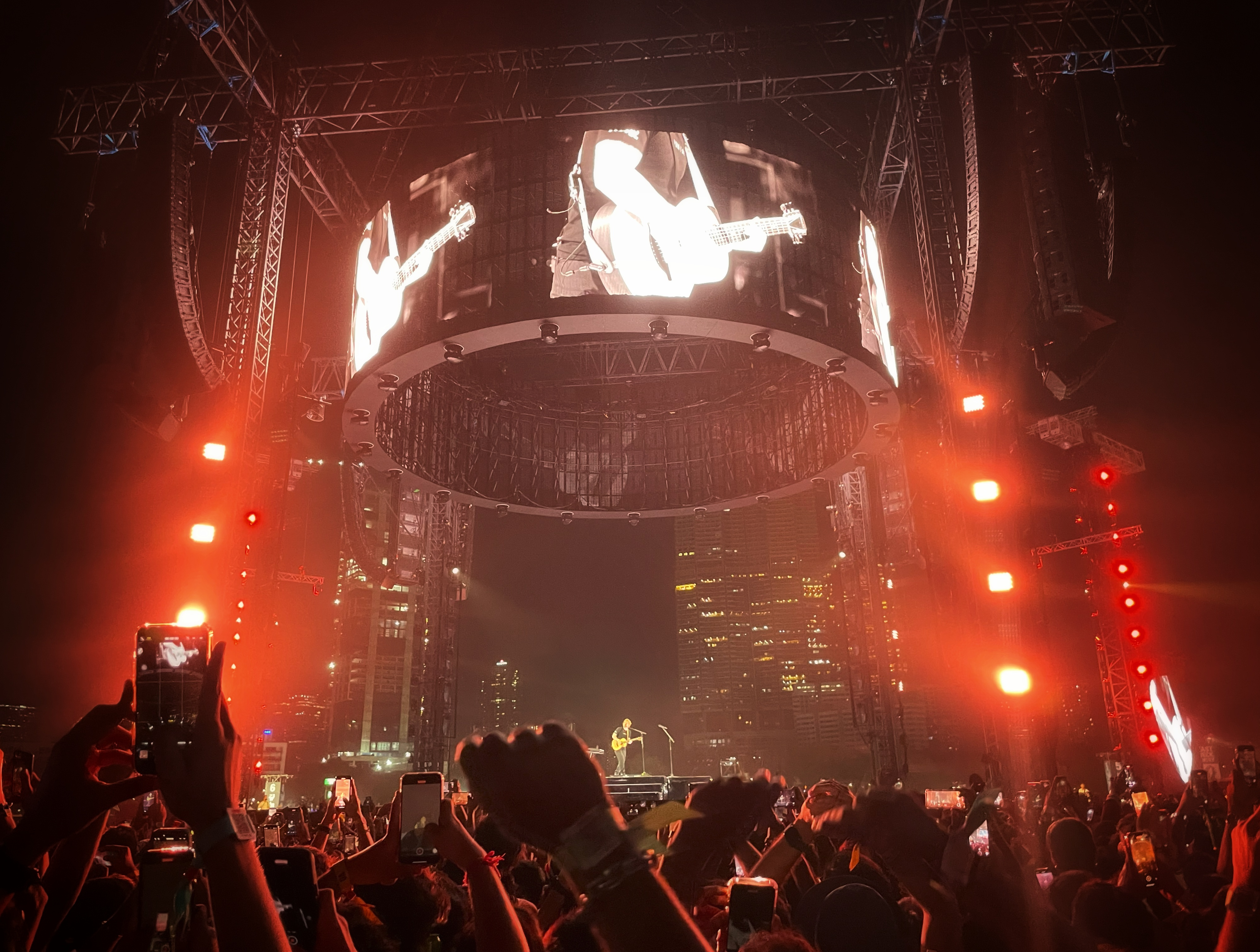
Sheeran at the Mahalakshmi Race Course in Mumbai on 16 March 2024

On 17 September 2021, Sheeran announced a 27-date European tour. As soon as tickets went on-sale, dates were added to several locations across the tour, due to overwhelming demand, bringing the overall number of shows to 64. On 15 March 2022, Sheeran announced the Oceania leg of the tour. Tickets went on-sale on 23 March 2022. On 22 March 2022, Sheeran added three more cities to the Oceania leg of the tour—in Brisbane, Sydney, and Melbourne. On 15 June 2022, Sheeran added a further three stops to the Oceania leg, in Wellington, Auckland, and Brisbane. On 20 September 2022, the additional Wellington show scheduled for 1 February 2023 was canceled, citing on-going uncertainties affecting a number of different variables with global touring. In October 2022, Sheeran announced that the North American leg of the tour would begin in 2023. In October 2023, he announced the Asian leg of the tour that would start in early 2024. In July 2024, he announced that the tour would end in 2025. In December 2024, Sheeran announced a show in Bhutan for early 2025, marking the country's first international concert.

Sheeran brought his family (wife Cherry, and daughters Lyra and Jupiter) along on tour (though they do not appear with him onstage). During early 2023, they all lived together for two months in a rented bungalow in Auckland from which he commuted to the Australian and New Zealand venues.

The "+−=÷× Tour" logo was first revealed on 6 May 2021 when Sheeran was announced as the shirt sponsor of Ipswich Town F.C. for their upcoming season in 2021–22 EFL League One, four months before the tour itself was announced. Sheeran's sponsorship deal with Ipswich Town lasted until the end of the 2024-25 season.

== Set list ==
This set list is representative of the show in Arlington, Texas on 6 May 2023. It does not represent all concerts for the duration of the tour.

1. "Tides"
2. "Blow"
3. "I'm a Mess"
4. "Shivers"
5. "The A Team"
6. "Castle on the Hill"
7. "Don't" / "No Diggity" (Blackstreet cover)
8. "Eyes Closed"
9. "Give Me Love"
10. "Boat"
11. "Salt Water"
12. "Own It" / "Peru" / "Beautiful People" / "I Don't Care"
13. "End of Youth"
14. "Overpass Graffiti"
15. "Curtains"
16. "Galway Girl"
17. "Thinking Out Loud"
18. "Love Yourself" (Justin Bieber cover)
19. "Sing"
20. "Photograph"
21. "Perfect"
22. "Bloodstream"
23. "Afterglow"
24. "Shape of You"
25. "Bad Habits"
26. "You Need Me, I Don't Need You"

=== Special changes ===
- Sheeran replaced Khalid as his own opening act in Landover, and he performed a set of eight songs from −.
- Eminem was a guest for the Detroit show on 15 July 2023, where he and Ed Sheeran performed "Lose Yourself" and "Stan".
- During the show in Singapore on 16 February 2024, Sheeran invited JJ Lin as the special guest and sang "Twilight" together in Mandarin.
- During the show in Parañaque, Philippines on 9 March 2024, Sheeran performed "Maybe the Night" with Miguel and Paolo Guico of Ben&Ben.
- During the show in Stockholm, Sweden on 22 August 2025, Sheeran performed "Talking Body" with Tove Lo.

== Tour dates ==
List of 2022 concerts, showing date, city, country, venue, opening acts, attendance and gross revenue
Date (2022)	City	Country	Venue	Opening acts	Attendance	Revenue
23 April	Dublin	Ireland	Croke Park	Maisie Peters; Denise Chaila	140,487 / 151,054	$12,765,829
24 April	Dublin	Ireland	Croke Park	Maisie Peters; Denise Chaila	140,487 / 151,054	$12,765,829
28 April	Cork	Ireland	Páirc Uí Chaoimh	Maisie Peters; Denise Chaila	68,697 / 78,648	$6,135,373
29 April	Cork	Ireland	Páirc Uí Chaoimh	Maisie Peters; Denise Chaila	68,697 / 78,648	$6,135,373
5 May	Limerick	Ireland	Thomond Park	Maisie Peters; Denise Chaila	61,780 / 63,232	$5,195,999
6 May	Limerick	Ireland	Thomond Park	Maisie Peters; Denise Chaila	61,780 / 63,232	$5,195,999
12 May	Belfast	Northern Ireland	Boucher Road Playing Fields	Maisie Peters; Denise Chaila	73,519 / 80,600	$6,467,830
13 May	Belfast	Northern Ireland	Boucher Road Playing Fields	Maisie Peters; Denise Chaila	73,519 / 80,600	$6,467,830
26 May	Cardiff	Wales	Principality Stadium	Maisie Peters; Dylan	185,490 / 236,088	$14,993,314
27 May	Cardiff	Wales	Principality Stadium	Maisie Peters; Dylan	185,490 / 236,088	$14,993,314
28 May	Cardiff	Wales	Principality Stadium	Maisie Peters; Dylan	185,490 / 236,088	$14,993,314
3 June	Sunderland	England	Stadium of Light	Maisie Peters; Dylan	106,641 / 114,312	$8,934,205
4 June	Sunderland	England	Stadium of Light	Maisie Peters; Dylan	106,641 / 114,312	$8,934,205
9 June	Manchester	England	Etihad Stadium	Maisie Peters; Dylan	218,639 / 218,639	$18,242,198
10 June	Manchester	England	Etihad Stadium	Maisie Peters; Dylan	218,639 / 218,639	$18,242,198
11 June	Manchester	England	Etihad Stadium	Maisie Peters; Dylan	218,639 / 218,639	$18,242,198
12 June	Manchester	England	Etihad Stadium	Maisie Peters; Dylan	218,639 / 218,639	$18,242,198
16 June	Glasgow	Scotland	Hampden Park	Maisie Peters; Dylan	93,344 / 109,713	$7,813,200
17 June	Glasgow	Scotland	Hampden Park	Maisie Peters; Dylan	93,344 / 109,713	$7,813,200
24 June	London	England	Wembley Stadium	Maisie Peters; Dylan	420,269 / 460,170	$38,437,649
25 June	London	England	Wembley Stadium	Maisie Peters; Dylan	420,269 / 460,170	$38,437,649
29 June	London	England	Wembley Stadium	Maisie Peters; Dylan	420,269 / 460,170	$38,437,649
30 June	London	England	Wembley Stadium	Maisie Peters; Dylan	420,269 / 460,170	$38,437,649
1 July	London	England	Wembley Stadium	Maisie Peters; Dylan	420,269 / 460,170	$38,437,649
7 July	Gelsenkirchen	Germany	Veltins-Arena	Maisie Peters; Cat Burns	182,476 / 193,050	$14,043,071
8 July	Gelsenkirchen	Germany	Veltins-Arena	Maisie Peters; Cat Burns	182,476 / 193,050	$14,043,071
9 July	Gelsenkirchen	Germany	Veltins-Arena	Maisie Peters; Cat Burns	182,476 / 193,050	$14,043,071
14 July	Amsterdam	Netherlands	Johan Cruyff Arena	Maisie Peters; Cat Burns	134,519 / 134,519	$8,983,470
15 July	Amsterdam	Netherlands	Johan Cruyff Arena	Maisie Peters; Cat Burns	134,519 / 134,519	$8,983,470
22 July	Brussels	Belgium	King Baudouin Stadium	Maisie Peters; Cat Burns; Dylan	104,473 / 128,006	$8,473,644
23 July	Brussels	Belgium	King Baudouin Stadium	Maisie Peters; Cat Burns; Dylan	104,473 / 128,006	$8,473,644
29 July	Saint-Denis (Note: Labelled as Paris in promotional material.)	France	Stade de France	Maisie Peters; Cat Burns	166,764 / 166,764	$11,051,261
30 July	Saint-Denis	France	Stade de France	Maisie Peters; Cat Burns	166,764 / 166,764	$11,051,261
3 August	Copenhagen	Denmark	Øresundsparken	Maisie Peters; Cat Burns	156,818 / 158,816	$15,229,461
4 August	Copenhagen	Denmark	Øresundsparken	Maisie Peters; Cat Burns	156,818 / 158,816	$15,229,461
5 August	Copenhagen	Denmark	Øresundsparken	Maisie Peters; Cat Burns	156,818 / 158,816	$15,229,461
6 August	Copenhagen	Denmark	Øresundsparken	Maisie Peters; Dylan	156,818 / 158,816	$15,229,461
10 August	Gothenburg	Sweden	Ullevi	Maisie Peters; Cat Burns	120,283 / 129,346	$9,513,028
11 August	Gothenburg	Sweden	Ullevi	Maisie Peters; Cat Burns	120,283 / 129,346	$9,513,028
20 August	Helsinki	Finland	Helsinki Olympic Stadium	Maisie Peters; Cat Burns	46,667 / 46,667	$4,229,589
25 August	Warsaw	Poland	PGE Narodowy	Maisie Peters; Cat Burns	146,340 / 150,536	$8,578,522
26 August	Warsaw	Poland	PGE Narodowy	Maisie Peters; Cat Burns	146,340 / 150,536	$8,578,522
1 September	Vienna	Austria	Ernst-Happel-Stadion	Maisie Peters; Cat Burns	124,800 / 130,596	$9,412,514
2 September	Vienna	Austria	Ernst-Happel-Stadion	Maisie Peters; Cat Burns	124,800 / 130,596	$9,412,514
10 September	Munich	Germany	Olympiastadion	Griff; Cat Burns	200,184 / 215,226	$15,643,726
11 September	Munich	Germany	Olympiastadion	Griff; Cat Burns	200,184 / 215,226	$15,643,726
12 September	Munich	Germany	Olympiastadion	Griff; Cat Burns	200,184 / 215,226	$15,643,726
16 September	Zürich	Switzerland	Letzigrund	Griff; Cat Burns	95,840 / 96,740	$12,010,301
17 September	Zürich	Switzerland	Letzigrund	Griff; Cat Burns	95,840 / 96,740	$12,010,301
23 September	Frankfurt	Germany	Deutsche Bank Park	Griff; Cat Burns	182,856 / 184,197	$13,708,897
24 September	Frankfurt	Germany	Deutsche Bank Park	Griff; Cat Burns	182,856 / 184,197	$13,708,897
25 September	Frankfurt	Germany	Deutsche Bank Park	Griff; Cat Burns	182,856 / 184,197	$13,708,897

List of 2023 concerts, showing date, city, country, venue, opening acts, attendance and gross revenue
Date (2023)	City	Country	Venue	Opening acts	Attendance	Revenue
24 January	Wellington	New Zealand	The Opera House	—N/a	—N/a	—N/a
25 January	Wellington	New Zealand	The Opera House	—N/a	—N/a	—N/a
26 January	Wellington	New Zealand	The Opera House	—N/a	—N/a	—N/a
2 February	Wellington	New Zealand	Sky Stadium	Maisie Peters; Kaylee Bell	47,260 / 47,260	$5,024,421
10 February	Auckland	New Zealand	Eden Park	Maisie Peters; Kaylee Bell	83,574 / 83,574	$7,416,980
11 February	Auckland	New Zealand	Eden Park	Maisie Peters; Kaylee Bell	83,574 / 83,574	$7,416,980
17 February	Brisbane	Australia	Suncorp Stadium	Maisie Peters; Budjerah	172,894 / 172,894	$19,059,460
18 February	Brisbane	Australia	Suncorp Stadium	Maisie Peters; Budjerah	172,894 / 172,894	$19,059,460
19 February	Brisbane	Australia	Suncorp Stadium	Maisie Peters; Budjerah	172,894 / 172,894	$19,059,460
24 February	Sydney	Australia	Accor Stadium	Maisie Peters; Budjerah	171,699 / 171,699	$18,927,891
25 February	Sydney	Australia	Accor Stadium	Maisie Peters; Budjerah	171,699 / 171,699	$18,927,891
2 March	Melbourne	Australia	Melbourne Cricket Ground	Maisie Peters; Budjerah	210,857 / 210,857	$20,844,960
3 March	Melbourne	Australia	Melbourne Cricket Ground	Maisie Peters; Budjerah	210,857 / 210,857	$20,844,960
7 March	Adelaide	Australia	Adelaide Oval	Maisie Peters; Budjerah	59,708 / 59,708	$6,640,294
12 March	Perth	Australia	Optus Stadium	Maisie Peters; Budjerah	59,980 / 59,980	$7,053,913
29 April (Note: This performance was part of New Orleans Jazz & Heritage Festival.)	New Orleans	United States	Fair Grounds Race Course	—N/a	—N/a	—N/a
6 May	Arlington	United States	AT&T Stadium	Khalid; Dylan	59,265 / 59,265	$5,733,414
13 May	Houston	United States	NRG Stadium	Khalid; Dylan	58,183 / 58,183	$5,321,684
20 May	Tampa	United States	Raymond James Stadium	Khalid; Dylan	77,891 / 77,891	$7,759,215
27 May	Atlanta	United States	Mercedes-Benz Stadium	Khalid; Dylan	76,335 / 76,335	$7,100,499
3 June	Philadelphia	United States	Lincoln Financial Field	Khalid; Dylan	77,900 / 77,900	$7,767,923
10 June	East Rutherford	United States	MetLife Stadium	Khalid; Dylan	173,391 / 173,391	$18,007,052
11 June	East Rutherford	United States	MetLife Stadium	Khalid; Dylan	173,391 / 173,391	$18,007,052
17 June	Toronto	Canada	Rogers Centre	Khalid; Rosa Linn	93,683 / 93,683	$9,917,478
18 June	Toronto	Canada	Rogers Centre	Khalid; Rosa Linn	93,683 / 93,683	$9,917,478
24 June	Landover	United States	FedExField	Ed Sheeran (Note: Sheeran acted as the opening act for himself, performing eight songs before his main set in place of Khalid who was recovering from a car accident.); Rosa Linn	62,270 / 62,270	$6,002,528
30 June	Foxborough	United States	Gillette Stadium	John Mayer; Rosa Linn	143,442 / 143,442	$13,551,095
1 July	Foxborough	United States	Gillette Stadium	Little Big Town; Rosa Linn	143,442 / 143,442	$13,551,095
8 July	Pittsburgh	United States	Acrisure Stadium	Rosa Linn; Khalid	67,829 / 67,829	$5,823,055
15 July	Detroit	United States	Ford Field	Rosa Linn; Khalid	70,372 / 70,372	$7,126,417
22 July	Nashville	United States	Nissan Stadium	Khalid; Cat Burns	73,874 / 73,874	$6,227,586
29 July	Chicago	United States	Soldier Field	Khalid; Cat Burns	73,015 / 73,015	$8,054,888
5 August	Kansas City	United States	GEHA Field at Arrowhead Stadium	Khalid; Cat Burns	70,352 / 70,352	$5,122,007
12 August	Minneapolis	United States	U.S. Bank Stadium	Khalid; Cat Burns	72,102 / 72,102	$6,714,462
19 August	Denver	United States	Empower Field at Mile High	Khalid; Cat Burns	79,680 / 79,680	$8,560,475
26 August	Seattle	United States	Lumen Field	Khalid; Maisie Peters	77,286 / 77,286	$7,942,459
2 September	Vancouver	Canada	BC Place	Khalid; Maisie Peters	65,061 / 65,061	$6,571,458
16 September	Santa Clara	United States	Levi's Stadium	Russ; Maisie Peters	80,058 / 80,058	$9,821,417
23 September	Inglewood	United States	SoFi Stadium	Russ; Maisie Peters	81,384 / 81,384	$9,225,764
28 October (Note: The concert in Paradise on 28 October 2023 was originally scheduled for 9 September 2023, but it was rescheduled due to safety concerns after part of the set collapsed.)	Paradise (Note: Labelled as Las Vegas in promotional material.)	United States	Allegiant Stadium	Russ; Maisie Peters	56,889 / 65,000	$6,562,734

List of 2024 concerts, showing date, city, country, venue, opening acts, attendance and gross revenue
Date (2024)	City	Country	Venue	Opening acts	Attendance	Revenue
15 January	Sakhir	Bahrain	Al-Dana Amphitheatre	Calum Scott	8,109 / 8,109	$1,786,745
19 January	Dubai	United Arab Emirates	The Sevens Stadium	Calum Scott	58,707 / 60,000	$10,578,529
20 January	Dubai	United Arab Emirates	The Sevens Stadium	Calum Scott	58,707 / 60,000	$10,578,529
27 January	Osaka	Japan	Kyocera Dome Osaka	Calum Scott	76,495 / 76,495	$11,570,417
28 January	Osaka	Japan	Kyocera Dome Osaka	Calum Scott	76,495 / 76,495	$11,570,417
31 January	Tokyo	Japan	Tokyo Dome	Calum Scott	50,646 / 50,646	$7,811,520
3 February	Kaohsiung	Taiwan	Kaohsiung National Stadium	Calum Scott	54,369 / 54,369	$9,668,365
10 February	Bangkok	Thailand	Rajamangala Stadium	Calum Scott	44,470 / 47,561	$5,049,215
16 February	Singapore		National Stadium	Calum Scott	57,161 / 61,490	$9,430,976
24 February	Kuala Lumpur	Malaysia	Bukit Jalil National Stadium	Calum Scott	50,277 / 59,184	$5,711,590
2 March (Note: The concert of 2 March 2024 at the Jakarta International Stadium in Jakarta was originally scheduled to take place at the Gelora Bung Karno Stadium but was relocated due to scheduling conflict.)	Jakarta	Indonesia	Jakarta International Stadium	Calum Scott	45,136 / 50,766	$5,796,589
9 March	Parañaque (Note: Labelled as Manila in promotional material.)	Philippines	SMDC Festival Grounds	Calum Scott; Ben&Ben	35,223 / 35,223	$6,031,560
16 March	Mumbai	India	Mahalaxmi Racecourse	Calum Scott; Prateek Kuhad	38,996 / 40,198	$3,712,563
24 May (Note: This concert is part of Boston Calling Music Festival.)	Boston	United States	Harvard Stadium	—N/a	—N/a	—N/a
26 May (Note: This concert is part of BottleRock Napa Valley.)	Napa	United States	Napa Valley Expo	—N/a	—N/a	—N/a
8 June (Note: This concert is part of Lucca Summer Festival.)	Lucca	Italy	Walls of Lucca	—N/a	78,179 / 78,304	$7,443,771
9 June (Note: This concert is part of Lucca Summer Festival.)	Lucca	Italy	Walls of Lucca	—N/a	78,179 / 78,304	$7,443,771
12 June (Note: This concert is park of Euro Fan Fest 2024.)	Munich	Germany	Theresienwiese	—N/a	46,154 / 60,002	$4,251,748
16 June (Note: This concert is part of Rock in Rio Lisboa.)	Lisbon	Portugal	Parque Tejo	—N/a	—N/a	—N/a
21 June (Note: This concert is part of Hurricane Festival.)	Scheeßel	Germany	Eichenring	—N/a	—N/a	—N/a
22 June (Note: This concert is part of Southside Festival.)	Neuhausen ob Eck	Germany	Neuhausen ob Eck Airfield	—N/a	—N/a	—N/a
23 June (Note: This concert is part of Pinkpop Festival.)	Landgraaf	Netherlands	Megaland	—N/a	—N/a	—N/a
26 June	Attard	Malta	Ta' Qali National Park	Calum Scott	31,056 / 32,645	$4,744,292
29 June	Tenerife	Spain	Estadio Heliodoro Rodríguez López	Calum Scott	34,445 / 35,248	$3,336,448
4 July (Note: This concert is part of Stavernfestivalen.)	Stavern	Norway	Larvik Golf Arena	—N/a	—N/a	—N/a
6 July (Note: This concert is part of O Gozo Festival.)	Santiago de Compostela	Spain	Auditorio Monte do Gozo	—N/a	—N/a	—N/a
12 July	Gdańsk	Poland	Polsat Plus Arena	Calum Scott	104,804 / 111,755	$10,526,255
13 July	Gdańsk	Poland	Polsat Plus Arena	Calum Scott	104,804 / 111,755	$10,526,255
20 July	Budapest	Hungary	Puskás Aréna	Calum Scott	58,747 / 64,183	$4,982,240
27 July	Hradec Králové	Czech Republic	Park 360	Calum Scott	64,370 / 100,672	$6,498,805
28 July	Hradec Králové	Czech Republic	Park 360	Calum Scott	64,370 / 100,672	$6,498,805
3 August	Kaunas	Lithuania	Darius and Girėnas Stadium	Calum Scott	81,119 / 96,627	$8,597,307
4 August	Kaunas	Lithuania	Darius and Girėnas Stadium	Calum Scott	81,119 / 96,627	$8,597,307
10 August	Zagreb	Croatia	Zagreb Hippodrome	Calum Scott; Dino Jelusick	57,700 / 68,560	$5,780,563
14 August (Note: This concert is part of FM4 Frequency Festival.)	St. Pölten	Austria	Greenpark	—N/a	—N/a	—N/a
17 August	Belgrade	Serbia	Ušće Park	Calum Scott	25,818 / 26,818	$2,570,168
24 August	Bucharest	Romania	Arena Națională	Calum Scott	57,444 / 65,240	$4,872,382
31 August	Sofia	Bulgaria	Vasil Levski National Stadium	Calum Scott	60,016 / 60,016	$4,920,589
7 September	Larnaca (Note: Labelled as Cyprus in promotional material.)	Cyprus	Land of Tomorrow	Calum Scott	15,199 / 17,314	$3,897,316
8 September	Larnaca	Cyprus	Land of Tomorrow	Calum Scott	15,199 / 17,314	$3,897,316
19 September (Note: This performance is part of Rock In Rio.)	Rio de Janeiro	Brazil	Barra Olympic Park	—N/a	—N/a	—N/a

List of 2025 concerts, showing date, city, country, venue, opening acts, attendance and gross revenue
Date (2025)	City	Country	Venue	Opening acts	Attendance	Revenue
24 January	Thimphu	Bhutan	Changlimithang Stadium	Rebellions Bhutan	23,000	—N/a
30 January	Pune	India	Yash Lawns	DOT	120,000	—N/a
2 February	Hyderabad	India	Ramoji Film City	Armaan Malik	120,000	—N/a
5 February	Chennai	India	YMCA Ground	Jonita Gandhi	120,000	—N/a
8 February	Bengaluru	India	NICE Grounds	Mali	120,000	—N/a
9 February	Bengaluru	India	NICE Grounds	Mali	120,000	—N/a
12 February	Shillong	India	Jawaharlal Nehru Stadium	Kayan	120,000	—N/a
15 February	Gurgaon (Note: Labelled as Delhi NCR in promotional material.)	India	Leisure Valley Park	Lisa Mishra	120,000	—N/a
24 February	Hangzhou	China	Hangzhou Olympic Sports Centre Gymnasium	—N/a	61,500	$11,700,000
25 February	Hangzhou	China	Hangzhou Olympic Sports Centre Gymnasium	—N/a	61,500	$11,700,000
26 February	Hangzhou	China	Hangzhou Olympic Sports Centre Gymnasium	—N/a	61,500	$11,700,000
28 February	Hangzhou	China	Hangzhou Olympic Sports Centre Gymnasium	—N/a	61,500	$11,700,000
1 March	Hangzhou	China	Hangzhou Olympic Sports Centre Gymnasium	—N/a	61,500	$11,700,000
2 March	Hangzhou	China	Hangzhou Olympic Sports Centre Gymnasium	—N/a	61,500	$11,700,000
26 April (Note: This concert was part of the Offlimits Festival.)	Abu Dhabi	United Arab Emirates	Etihad Park	—N/a	32,000	—N/a
30 April	Lusail (Note: Labelled as Doha in promotional material.)	Qatar	Lusail Multipurpose Hall	Zeyne	—N/a	—N/a
2 May	Sakhir	Bahrain	Beyon Al Dana Amphitheatre	Zeyne	10,000	$1,100,000
30 May	Madrid	Spain	Riyadh Air Metropolitano	Tori Kelly; Myles Smith	135,000	$13,200,000
31 May	Madrid	Spain	Riyadh Air Metropolitano	Tori Kelly; Myles Smith	135,000	$13,200,000
6 June	Marseille	France	Orange Vélodrome	Tori Kelly; Myles Smith	126,000	$13,000,000
7 June	Marseille	France	Orange Vélodrome	Tori Kelly; Myles Smith	126,000	$13,000,000
14 June	Rome	Italy	Stadio Olimpico	Tori Kelly; Myles Smith	78,000	$9,400,000
20 June	Villeneuve-d'Ascq (Note: Labelled as Lille in promotional material.)	France	Decathlon Arena	Tori Kelly; Myles Smith	130,000	$14,300,000
21 June	Villeneuve-d'Ascq	France	Decathlon Arena	Tori Kelly; Myles Smith	130,000	$14,300,000
28 June	Stuttgart	Germany	MHPArena	Tori Kelly; Myles Smith	121,000	$13,000,000
29 June	Stuttgart	Germany	MHPArena	Tori Kelly; Myles Smith	121,000	$13,000,000
4 July	Hamburg	Germany	Volksparkstadion	Tori Kelly; Myles Smith	169,000	$16,900,000
5 July	Hamburg	Germany	Volksparkstadion	Tori Kelly; Myles Smith	169,000	$16,900,000
6 July	Hamburg	Germany	Volksparkstadion	Tori Kelly; Myles Smith	169,000	$16,900,000
11 July	Ipswich	England	Portman Road	Tori Kelly; Myles Smith	83,800	$9,600,000
12 July	Ipswich	England	Portman Road	Busted; Dylan	83,800	$9,600,000
13 July	Ipswich	England	Portman Road	James Blunt; Maisie Peters	83,800	$9,600,000
26 July	Oslo	Norway	Ullevaal Stadion	Tori Kelly; Myles Smith	75,200	$8,000,000
27 July	Oslo	Norway	Ullevaal Stadion	Tori Kelly; Myles Smith	75,200	$8,000,000
2 August	Zürich	Switzerland	Letzigrund	Tori Kelly; Myles Smith	93,600	$15,400,000
3 August	Zürich	Switzerland	Letzigrund	Tori Kelly; Myles Smith	93,600	$15,400,000
7 August	Antwerp	Belgium	Middenvijver Park	Tori Kelly; Myles Smith	94,300	$10,900,000
8 August	Antwerp	Belgium	Middenvijver Park	Tori Kelly; Myles Smith	94,300	$10,900,000
15 August	Wrocław	Poland	Tarczyński Arena	Tori Kelly; Myles Smith	105,000	$11,900,000
16 August	Wrocław	Poland	Tarczyński Arena	Tori Kelly; Myles Smith	105,000	$11,900,000
22 August	Stockholm	Sweden	Strawberry Arena	Tori Kelly; Myles Smith	110,000	$11,200,000
23 August	Stockholm	Sweden	Strawberry Arena	Tori Kelly; Myles Smith	110,000	$11,200,000
28 August	Copenhagen	Denmark	Øresundsparken	Tori Kelly; Myles Smith	179,000	$25,600,000
29 August	Copenhagen	Denmark	Øresundsparken	Tori Kelly; Myles Smith	179,000	$25,600,000
30 August	Copenhagen	Denmark	Øresundsparken	Tori Kelly; Myles Smith	179,000	$25,600,000
31 August	Copenhagen	Denmark	Øresundsparken	Tori Kelly; Myles Smith	179,000	$25,600,000
5 September	Düsseldorf	Germany	Merkur Spiel-Arena	Tori Kelly; Myles Smith	191,000	$18,100,000
6 September	Düsseldorf	Germany	Merkur Spiel-Arena	Tori Kelly; Myles Smith	191,000	$18,100,000
7 September	Düsseldorf	Germany	Merkur Spiel-Arena	Tori Kelly; Myles Smith	191,000	$18,100,000
Total					8,800,000	$875,700,000

== Cancelled shows ==
List of cancelled concerts, showing date, city, country, venue and reason
Date	City	Country	Venue	Reason	Ref.
11 August 2022	Helsinki	Finland	Helsinki Olympic Stadium	Unforeseen and unavoidable obstacles	
1 February 2023	Wellington	New Zealand	Sky Stadium	Logistical uncertainties affecting global touring	

== See also ==
- List of Billboard Boxscore number-one concert series of the 2020s
- List of highest-grossing concert series at a single venue
- List of highest-grossing concert tours
- List of most-attended concert series at a single venue
- List of most-attended concert tours
- List of most-attended concerts

== Notes ==
Cities

Others
