= F64 =

F64, F-64, f64, or f/64 may refer to:

- Group f/64, a 1932 group of San Francisco photographers
- HMS Kingston (F64), a 1939 British Royal Navy K-class destroyer
- Gender identity disorder's ICD-10 code
- Famicom 64, an alternate name of a Japanese version of Nintendo 64
- Double-precision floating-point format, as it's known by its type annotation f64 in Rust.
- "F64" (song), a 2023 song by Ed Sheeran
