= Aaron Dessner =

American musician (born 1976)

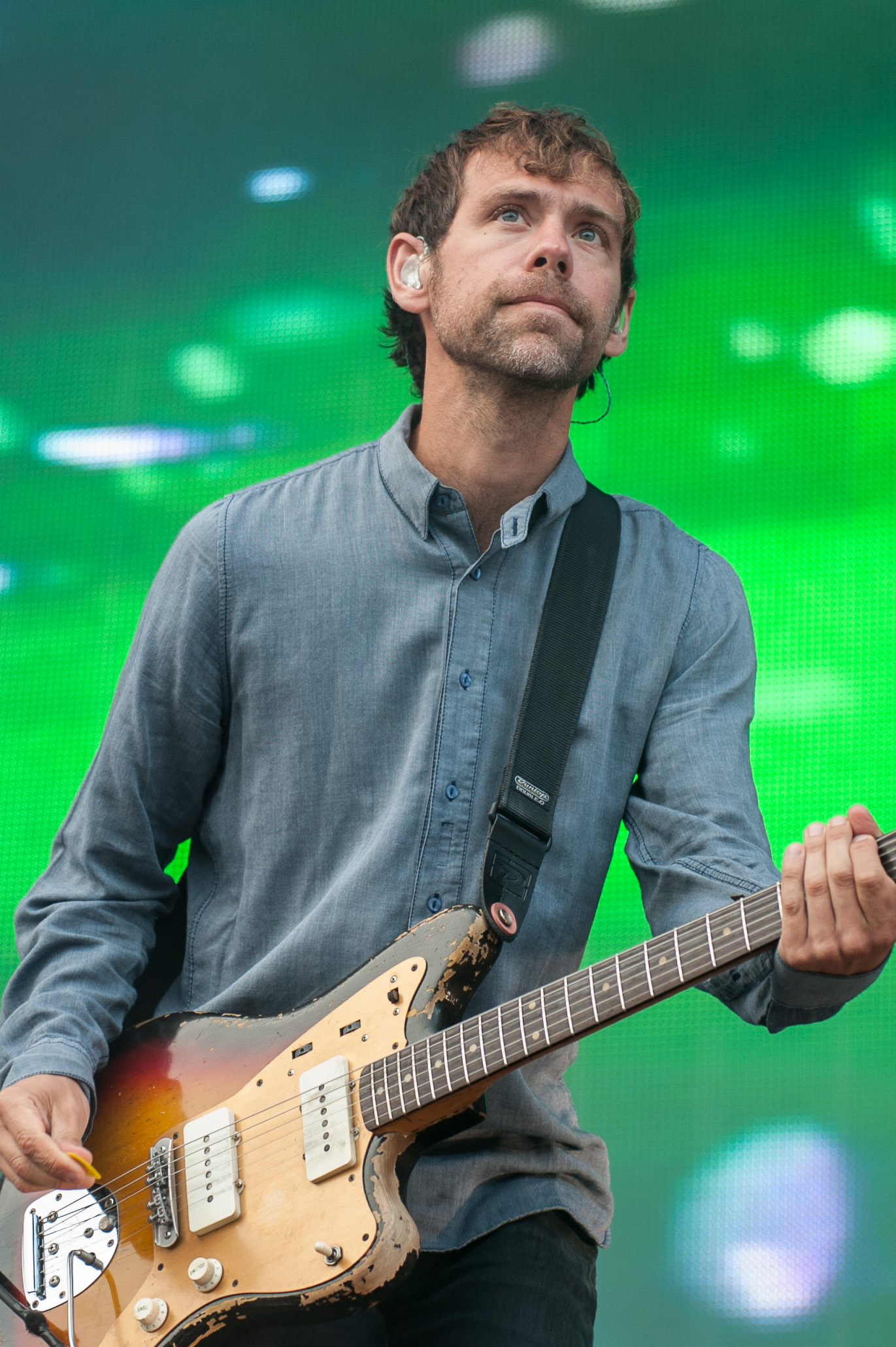
- Dessner at Way Out West in Gothenburg, Sweden, 2014

Background information
- Born: Aaron Brooking Dessner; April 23, 1976 (age 50); Cincinnati, Ohio, U.S.
- Occupations: Record producer; songwriter; instrumentalist
- Instruments: Guitar; keyboards; bass; harmonica; mandola; drums; vocals
- Years active: 1998–present
- Member of: The National; Big Red Machine
- Spouse: Stine Wengler

Aaron Brooking Dessner (born April 23, 1976) is an American musician. He is best known as a founding member of the rock band the National, with whom he has recorded ten studio albums; a co-founder of the indie rock duo Big Red Machine, teaming with Bon Iver's Justin Vernon; and a collaborator on Taylor Swift's critically acclaimed studio albums Folklore and Evermore, both of which contended for the Grammy Award for Album of the Year in 2021 and 2022, respectively, with the former winning the accolade; as well as The Tortured Poets Department (2024).

Dessner has co-written, produced or co-produced songs by Noah Kahan, Taylor Swift, Ed Sheeran, Michael Stipe, Gracie Abrams, Frightened Rabbit, Ben Howard, Sharon Van Etten, Local Natives, This Is the Kit, Adia Victoria, Lisa Hannigan, Fred Again, Girl in Red, Mustafa the Poet, Brian Eno, Laufey, Mumford & Sons, Florence and The Machine, Brandi Carlile, Kevin Morby and Lone Bellow, among others. Dessner co-founded and curates three music festivals: Eaux Claires in Eau Claire, Wisconsin, alongside his Big Red Machine partner Vernon; HAVEN in Copenhagen with his brother Bryce, and Boston Calling Music Festival.

On May 19, 2022, alongside Questlove, Dessner was awarded a Doctor of Fine Arts honoris causa from The University of the Arts, for "his eagerness to seek out opportunities, to really be a thoughtful collaborator, and someone who would encourage every single student at UArts to explore with their peers across disciplines, new opportunities, and new ideas."

Dessner, along with his twin brother Bryce, was named the 243rd greatest guitarist of all time by Rolling Stone in 2023.

== Early life ==
Dessner grew up in Cincinnati, Ohio with his twin brother, Bryce Dessner. Dessner was raised as Jewish and has Polish Jewish and Russian Jewish ancestry. Dessner has said that his Jewish background influences his music: "My brother and I have always been fascinated by liturgical religious melodies in Judaism ... I don't like major chords. I like the meditative patterns in certain prayers, and I like music that repeats itself." Dessner attended high school at Cincinnati Country Day School and graduated in 1994. Dessner went on to study Modern European History at Columbia University.

== Career ==
=== The National ===
Aaron Dessner and his twin brother Bryce were childhood friends with Bryan Devendorf. In 1998, after Dessner's earlier band, Project Nim, broke up, Devendorf invited the brothers to join his band the National. With Devendorf and the Dessner brothers were Scott Devendorf, Bryan's older brother, and Matt Berninger. The band's self-titled first album was released in 2001 on Brassland Records, a label Dessner co-founded along with his brother Bryce and Alec Hanley Bemis. The band's second album, Sad Songs for Dirty Lovers, was released in 2003, also on Brassland. After some critical success with Sad Songs, the band signed with Beggars Banquet Records. With the new label, they released their third studio album, Alligator, in 2005. The album received a positive response from critics, which exposed the band to a larger audience.

In 2007, the band released their fourth album, Boxer, also through Beggars Banquet. Upon release, the album received widespread critical acclaim, and was named to "album of the year" lists. Several songs from the album appeared in TV shows and movies. In 2008, then-Senator Barack Obama used an instrumental version of the song "Fake Empire" in a presidential campaign video.

Following the success of Boxer, the band began collaborating with other artists on various songs and compilation albums. In 2009, the band participated in Dark Was the Night, a charity album to benefit the Red Hot Organization. That same year, they recorded a song for the album Ciao My Shining Star: The Songs of Mark Mulcahy, to help support Polaris frontman Mark Mulcahy who had recently lost his wife. In 2010, the band released High Violet, their fifth full-length album. The album saw both critical and commercial success, debuting at No. 3 on US charts, and going on to sell over 850,000 copies worldwide. The band followed up High Violet by releasing their sixth album, Trouble Will Find Me, on May 21, 2013, via 4AD. Like their previous two efforts, Trouble was named to several year-end best-of lists. The album was nominated for Best Alternative Album at the 56th Grammy Awards. Later that year, Dessner and the rest of the band were featured in the documentary Mistaken for Strangers, which followed the band's tour for High Violet and early recording of Trouble.

In 2017, the band released Sleep Well Beast, their seventh full-length album. The lead single from the album, "The System Only Dreams in Total Darkness", became the band's first song to reach No. 1 on a Billboards chart after topping the Adult Alternative Songs list in August that same year. The band released their eighth studio album I Am Easy to Find in 2019 alongside a short film by Mike Mills. In 2023, the band released two studio albums, First Two Pages of Frankenstein and Laugh Track, with the latter being a surprise album.

Dessner has production credits on all of the band's albums since Alligator. The majority of both High Violet and Trouble Will Find Me were recorded in his garage studio behind his house in Brooklyn, and Alligator and Boxer were partially recorded in his attic and in his sister's attic, which is on the same street in Brooklyn.

=== Big Red Machine ===
In 2008, Dessner sent Justin Vernon an instrumental sketch of a song called "Big Red Machine" for the compilation album Dark Was the Night. Vernon wrote a song to it, interpreting the Big Red Machine title as a heart. After 10 years, the pair formed a band called Big Red Machine, and on August 31, 2018, released a self-titled album. The record was produced by Vernon and Dessner with longtime collaborator Brad Cook and engineered by Jonathan Low primarily at Dessner's studio Long Pond in Upper Hudson Valley, New York.

The duo released a second studio album How Long Do You Think It's Gonna Last? on August 27, 2021. The album was produced by Dessner and featured many guests and many of his previous collaborators, including Ben Howard, Sharon Van Etten, and Taylor Swift.

=== Other production work ===
Dessner worked with singer Sharon Van Etten on her album, Tramp (2012). Van Etten and Dessner spent over fourteen months working in his studio, finally releasing the album to widespread critical success. Dessner produced Local Natives' second full-length album Hummingbird, in 2013. Dessner was first introduced to the band while on tour with the National. Hummingbird received positive reviews, and Pitchfork praised Dessner's production work especially, saying that he "knows how to make things sound good, and there's plenty of richness and depth to these songs." Dessner produced the Lone Bellow's Then Came the Morning, which was recorded in Dessner's garage as well as in a 19th-century church in upstate New York. The album was released in January 2015 on Descendent Records. That same year, he worked with This Is the Kit for their album Bashed Out, which was released through Dessner's Brassland Records.

In 2016, Dessner produced Lisa Hannigan's album At Swim. The album reached No. 1 in Ireland, No. 7 on the US Top Heatseekers Albums chart and No. 24 in the UK, and received widespread critical acclaim. The Guardian, which awarded it four out of five stars, commented on the album's "stunningly pretty songs with quietly powerful undertones" and the Evening Standard, which also awarded it four out of five stars, praised the "new-found accessibility" of the album. Additionally, Dessner produced Day of the Dead, which was released in 2016, and Dark Was the Night, both of which are AIDS charity compilations for the Red Hot Organization; and Doveman's 2009 release The Conformist. Frightened Rabbit's fifth album Painting of a Panic Attack, released in 2016 via Atlantic Records, was also produced by Dessner. Dessner produced the Lone Bellow's 2020 album Half Moon Light and co-wrote several tracks on it. He also co-wrote and produced the acclaimed debut of UK songwriter Eve Owen, Don't Let the Ink Dry, released in 2020.

In April 2020, during the COVID-19 pandemic, Dessner was approached by American singer-songwriter Taylor Swift to collaborate on music, and he subsequently produced and co-wrote her eighth studio album, Folklore. It was a surprise release that debuted to critical acclaim on July 24, 2020, and won Album of the Year at the 63rd Annual Grammy Awards in 2021. Dessner continued his collaboration with Swift on her subsequent albums Evermore (2020), Midnights (2022), and The Tortured Poets Department (2024), as well as her re-recorded albums Fearless (Taylor's Version) (2021), Red (Taylor's Version) (2021), and Speak Now (Taylor's Version) (2023). After the release of Folklore, the documentary film Folklore: The Long Pond Studio Sessions and Evermore, artists such as Maya Hawke, Gracie Abrams, Ed Sheeran, King Princess, and Girl in Red expressed interest in collaborating with Dessner and recording songs at his Long Pond Studio. Dessner stated, "After Taylor, it was a bit crazy how many people reached out. And getting to meet and write songs with people you wouldn't have had access to... I'm so grateful for it."

Dessner also co-produced British singer-songwriter Ben Howard's fourth studio album, Collections from the Whiteout, alongside Howard himself, which was released on March 26, 2021. On October 7, 2022, Indigo Sparke's sophomore album was released with Dessner credited as a producer, co-writer, and musician. On Instagram, Dessner congratulated Sparke on her upcoming single, saying that together they "made one of [his] favorite records [he's] ever been a part of".

=== Film scores ===
Dessner and his brother Bryce co-composed the score for Transpecos, which won the Audience Award at the 2016 South by Southwest. They also worked together on the score for 2013 film Big Sur, an adaptation of the 1962 novel of the same name by Jack Kerouac. The film debuted on January 23, 2013, at the Sundance Film Festival, where it received positive reviews. In 2021, together with his brother, Dessner scored two films – Mike Mills' C'mon C'mon and Cyrano.

== Collaborations ==
=== Day of the Dead ===
On March 17, 2016, Aaron and Bryce Dessner announced Day of the Dead, a charity tribute album to the Grateful Dead released by 4AD on May 20, 2016. Day of the Dead was created, curated and produced by both Dessner brothers. The compilation is a wide-ranging tribute to the songwriting and experimentalism of the Dead which took four years to record, features over 60 artists from varied musical backgrounds, 59 tracks and is almost 6 hours long. All profits will help fight for AIDS/ HIV and related health issues around the world through the Red Hot Organization. Day of the Dead is the follow-up to 2009's Dark Was the Night (4AD), a 32-track, multi-artist compilation also produced by the Dessner brothers for Red Hot.

Of the 59 tracks on the compilation, many feature a house band made up of Aaron, Bryce, fellow the National bandmates and brothers Scott and Bryan Devendorf, Josh Kaufman (who co-produced the project), and Conrad Doucette along with Sam Cohen and Walter Martin. The National have a couple of tracks on the album, including "Peggy-O", "Morning Dew" and "I Know You Rider".

A Day of the Dead live performance took place in August 2016 at the second annual Eaux Claires Festival (August 12–13) featuring Jenny Lewis, Matthew Houck, Lucius, Will Oldham, Sam Amidon, Richard Reed Parry, Justin Vernon, Bruce Hornsby, Ruban Nielson and The National.

=== Forever Love ===
Forever Love is a collaboration between Aaron and Bryce Dessner, renowned Icelandic performance artist Ragnar Kjartansson and Gyða and Kristín Anna Valtýsdóttir, formerly of the Icelandic band múm. The project is a blending of visual and performance art with live music, all centered around a song cycle written and performed by Aaron and Bryce alongside Gyða and Kristín Anna Valtýsdóttir. It was commissioned by Eaux Claires Festival and made its world premiere in 2015 where it served as the official starting point of the festival on both Friday and Saturday.

Forever Love marked a live performance reunion for the Dessner twins and Kjartansson, as both artists had previously collaborated on a six-hour video work, A Lot of Sorrow, which documents the National performing their three-song "Sorrow" for six hours in front of a live audience at MoMA PS1.

=== The Long Count ===
The Long Count was a large commission for the BAM Next Wave Festival in 2009. Dessner and his brother, Bryce, worked alongside visual artist Matthew Ritchie, creating a work loosely based on the Mayan creation story Popol Vuh. The work included a 12-piece orchestra and a number of guest singers, including Kim and Kelley Deal (the Breeders, the Pixies), Matt Berninger (the National), Shara Worden (My Brightest Diamond), and Tunde Adebimpe (TV on the Radio). The work had its world premiere at the Krannert Center for the Performing Arts in September 2009 as part of the Ellnora Festival.

=== Dark Was the Night ===
In 2009, Aaron and Bryce Dessner produced an extensive AIDS charity compilation, Dark Was the Night, for the Red Hot Organization. Dark Was the Night has raised over 2 million dollars for AIDS charities as of January 2012. In 2009, Dessner contributed a track to the Dark Was the Night compilation. On May 3, 2009, 4AD and Red Hot produced Dark Was the Night – Live, a concert celebrating the newest Red Hot album. The show took place at Radio City Music Hall and featured several of the artists that contributed to the compilation.

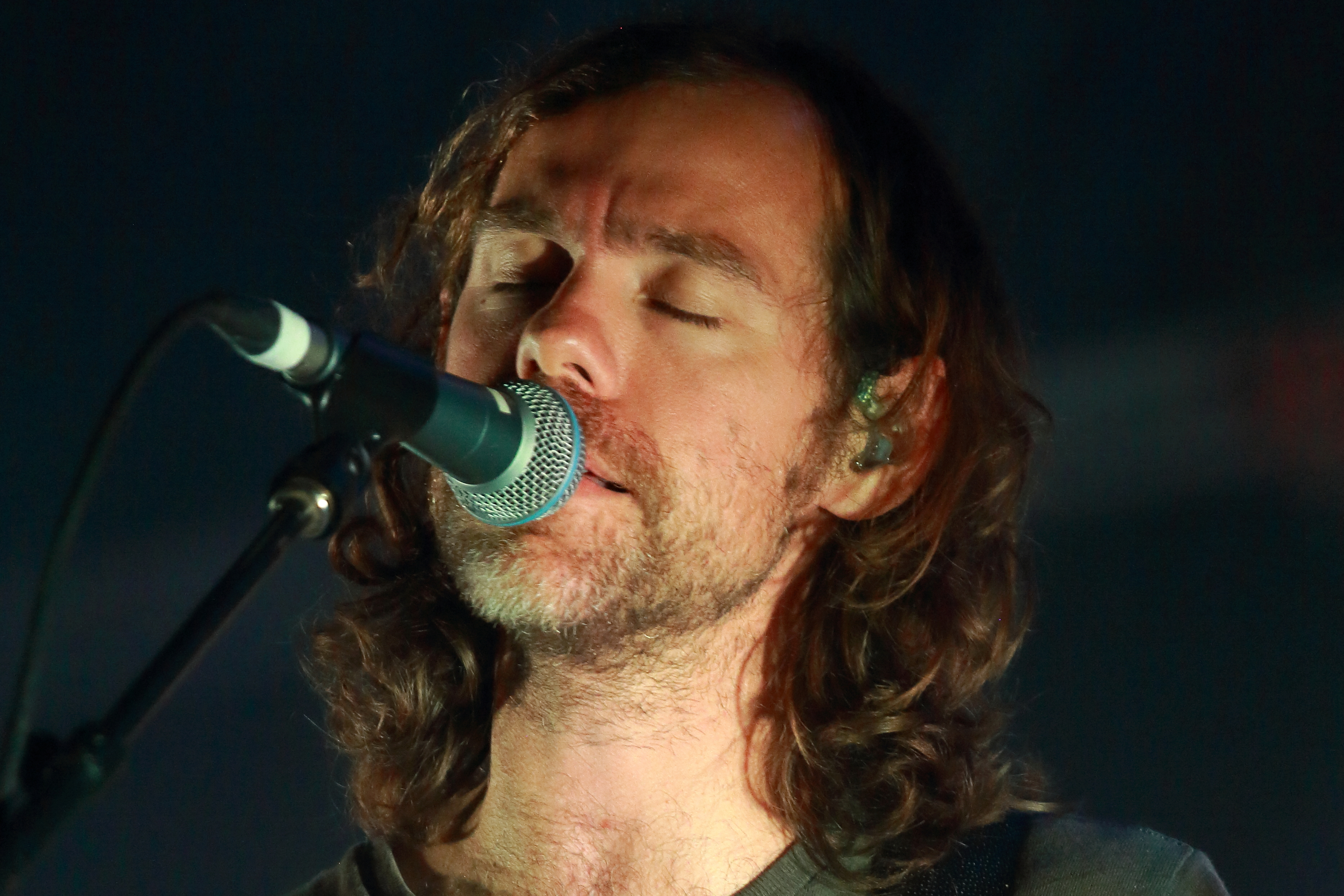
Aaron Dessner performing with The National at Byron Bay Bluesfest, Easter 2016

=== Other collaborations and contributions ===
Dessner is a frequent collaborator with a wide range of musicians, including his brother and bandmate Bryce Dessner. In August 2008, Aaron and Bryce performed a collaborative concert with David Cossin, and Luca Tarantino as a part of Soundres, an international residency program for contemporary music and art in Salento, Italy and at the Guitare Au Palais Festival Perpignan France. They also performed at Matthew Ritchie's Ghost Operator opening at the White Cube Gallery in London. Aaron and Bryce have also collaborated with many world-renowned orchestras. Most recently the brothers played with the Copenhagen Philharmonic in a concert billed as "Sixty Minutes of the Dessners".

The program included "St. Carolyn by the Sea", "Lachrimae" and "Raphael", all of which were composed by Bryce Dessner. Bryce and Aaron have also performed "St. Carolyn by the Sea" and "Raphael" with the Amsterdam Sinfonietta during the Holland Festival. These performances took place at Muziekgebouw aan 't IJ in Amsterdam and Muziekgebouw Frits Philips in Eindhoven. In October 2011, Dessner joined his brother to perform "St. Carolyn by the Sea" with the American Composers Orchestra at The World Financial Center in New York City.

Marshall Curry's award-winning documentary Racing Dreams includes music contributed by both Dessner and the National. "Win Win" directed by Thomas McCarthy closes with "Think You Can Wait", a track written by Dessner and Matt Berninger, recorded by the National with additional vocals from Sharon Van Etten. Dessner also played an important role in the National's contribution to the HBO show Game of Thrones.

In March 2012, Dessner, Scott Devendorf and Bryan Devendorf teamed up with Grateful Dead guitarist Bob Weir for a live webcast, which featured two musical sets and a political discussion. The event was produced by Head Count, a non-partisan organization that uses live music events to promote voter registration and awareness. In May 2012, the National's performance of "Rains of Castamere" played during the closing credits of season two episode nine. In December 2012, Dessner curated a day of Other Voices, an Irish music festival that aired live on RTÉ Two in Ireland. The performances took place in the Church of St James in Dingle, County Kerry.

Dessner co-founded the PEOPLE festival in Berlin, an event he attributes in part to his production success, being called "The Dessner Effect" by journalist Karin Kloosterman.

== Curator ==
=== Eaux Claires Music & Arts Festival ===
Eaux Claires is a music festival founded and curated by Dessner and Justin Vernon. The inaugural festival took place in July 2015 in Vernon's hometown of Eau Claire, Wisconsin. Speaking about the festival, Dessner and Vernon said they were driven by the idea that this festival would "encourage music-genre-walls to melt away".

=== PEOPLE Festival ===
PEOPLE Festival is a not-for-profit gathering of artists in Berlin for a weekend-long festival of music curated and produced by Aaron Dessner along with his brother Bryce Dessner, Bon Iver, Berlin's Michelberger Hotel and others. The first festival took place October 1–2, 2016, under the name "Michelberger Music" in the Funkhaus, the historical radio recording studios of the former GDR. It also took place 2018, and after a long reprieve again in 2026.

=== Boston Calling Music Festival ===
Boston Calling is a music festival co-curated by Dessner. Debuting in May 2013, Boston Calling previously took place twice a year, May and September, at City Hall Plaza. Boston Calling moved to the Harvard Athletic Complex in Allston in May 2017 and transitioned to one festival per year.

== Record labels ==
Dessner co-founded the record label 37d03d (read: PEOPLE upside down) with Justin Vernon and Bryce Dessner.

Alongside Alec Hanley Bemis and Bryce Dessner, Dessner founded Brassland Records, a label that has released albums from the National, This Is the Kit, Clogs, Doveman and Nico Muhly.

== Musical equipment ==
Dessner often plays a 1965 Gibson Firebird purchased on eBay and refurbished. During the Sleep Well Beast recording sessions, he used the Firebird as well as a 1972 Fender Telecaster. During live shows, Dessner usually plays the Firebird and a 1963 Fender Jazzmaster.

For the Sleep Well Beast sessions, amplifiers used include a 1959 Fender Champ, a 1960s Fender Princeton, a 1970s Music Man, an Ampeg Gemini, and a Fender Bassman.

== Personal life ==
Dessner married Stine Wengler around 2016. They have three children, one of whom is named Robin. Taylor Swift's song of the same name is speculated to be about him. Dessner is a keen soccer fan and an avid supporter of Liverpool F.C.

== Awards and nominations ==
=== Grammy Awards ===
Year	Work	Award	Result	Ref.
2014	Trouble Will Find Me	Best Alternative Music Album	Nominated	
2018	Sleep Well Beast	Best Alternative Music Album	Won	
2021	"Cardigan"	Song of the Year	Nominated	
2021	Folklore	Best Pop Vocal Album	Nominated	
2021	Folklore	Album of the Year	Won	
2022	Evermore	Album of the Year	Nominated	
2024	("subtract")	Best Pop Vocal Album	Nominated	
2025	The Tortured Poets Department	Album of the Year	Nominated	

== Discography ==
=== With The National ===
- The National (2001)
- Sad Songs for Dirty Lovers (2003)
- Alligator (2005)
- Boxer (2007)
- High Violet (2010)
- Trouble Will Find Me (2013)
- Sleep Well Beast (2017)
- I Am Easy to Find (2019)
- First Two Pages of Frankenstein (2023)
- Laugh Track (2023)

=== With Project Nim ===
- A Tower of Babel (1995)
- Where the Nothings Live (1997)
- Evenings Pop and Curve (1998)

=== With Equinox ===
- Equinox (1993)

=== With Big Red Machine ===
- Big Red Machine (August 31, 2018)
- How Long Do You Think It's Gonna Last? (August 27, 2021)

=== With Complete Mountain Almanac ===
- Complete Mountain Almanac (January 27, 2023)

=== Film scores ===
- Big Sur (2013) with Bryce Dessner
- Transpecos (2016) with Bryce Dessner
- C'mon, C'mon (2021) with Bryce Dessner

=== Stage musicals ===
- Cyrano (2018) with Matt Berninger, Carin Besser, Bryce Dessner, and Erica Schmidt

=== Production and songwriting credits for other artists ===
Key
‡	Indicates songs solely written or produced by Aaron Dessner

Year	Artist	Song	Album	Written with	Produced with
2016	Frightened Rabbit	"Death Dream"	Painting Of A Panic Attack	Andy Monaghan, Billy Kennedy, Grant Hutchison, Scott Hutchison and Simon Liddell	Sole production ‡
2016	Frightened Rabbit	"Get Out"	Painting Of A Panic Attack	Andy Monaghan, Billy Kennedy, Grant Hutchison, Scott Hutchison and Simon Liddell	Sole production ‡
2016	Frightened Rabbit	"I Wish I Was Sober"	Painting Of A Panic Attack	Andy Monaghan, Billy Kennedy, Grant Hutchison, Scott Hutchison and Simon Liddell	Sole production ‡
2016	Frightened Rabbit	"Woke Up Hurting"	Painting Of A Panic Attack	Andy Monaghan, Billy Kennedy, Grant Hutchison, Scott Hutchison and Simon Liddell	Sole production ‡
2016	Frightened Rabbit	"Little Drum"	Painting Of A Panic Attack	Aaron Dessner, Andy Monaghan, Billy Kennedy, Grant Hutchison, Scott Hutchison and Simon Liddell	Sole production ‡
2016	Frightened Rabbit	"Still Want to Be Here"	Painting Of A Panic Attack	Andy Monaghan, Billy Kennedy, Grant Hutchison, Scott Hutchison and Simon Liddell	Sole production ‡
2016	Frightened Rabbit	"An Otherwise Disappointing Life"	Painting Of A Panic Attack	Andy Monaghan, Billy Kennedy, Grant Hutchison, Scott Hutchison and Simon Liddell	Sole production ‡
2016	Frightened Rabbit	"Break"	Painting Of A Panic Attack	Aaron Dessner, Andy Monaghan, Billy Kennedy, Grant Hutchison, Scott Hutchison and Simon Liddell	Sole production ‡
2016	Frightened Rabbit	"Blood Under the Bridge"	Painting Of A Panic Attack	Andy Monaghan, Billy Kennedy, Grant Hutchison, Scott Hutchison and Simon Liddell	Sole production ‡
2016	Frightened Rabbit	"400 Bones"	Painting Of A Panic Attack	Andy Monaghan, Billy Kennedy, Grant Hutchison, Scott Hutchison and Simon Liddell	Sole production ‡
2016	Frightened Rabbit	"Lump Street"	Painting Of A Panic Attack	Andy Monaghan, Billy Kennedy, Grant Hutchison, Scott Hutchison and Simon Liddell	Sole production ‡
2016	Frightened Rabbit	"Die Like A Rich Boy"	Painting Of A Panic Attack	Andy Monaghan, Billy Kennedy, Grant Hutchison, Scott Hutchison and Simon Liddell	Sole production ‡
2019	Adia Victoria	"Clean"	Silences	Mason Hickman	Adia Victoria
2019	Adia Victoria	"Bring Her Back"	Silences	Mason Hickman	Adia Victoria
2019	Adia Victoria	"Pacolet Road"	Silences	Mason Hickman	Adia Victoria
2019	Adia Victoria	"The City"	Silences	Mason Hickman, Herbert Nichols, Adia Victoria, Billie Holiday	Adia Victoria
2019	Adia Victoria	"Devil is A Lie"	Silences	Mason Hickman	Adia Victoria
2019	Adia Victoria	"The Needle's Eye"	Silences	Mason Hickman	Adia Victoria
2019	Adia Victoria	"Cry Wolf"	Silences	Mason Hickman	Adia Victoria
2019	Adia Victoria	"Heathen"	Silences	Mason Hickman	Adia Victoria
2019	Adia Victoria	"Nice Folks"	Silences	Mason Hickman	Adia Victoria
2019	Adia Victoria	"Dope Queen Blues"	Silences	Mason Hickman	Adia Victoria
2019	Adia Victoria	"Get Lonely"	Silences	Mason Hickman	Adia Victoria
2020	Eve Owen	"Tudor"	Don't Let The Ink Dry	Eve Owen	Sole production ‡
2020	Eve Owen	"Lover Not Today"	Don't Let The Ink Dry	Eve Owen	Sole production ‡
2020	Eve Owen	"Mother"	Don't Let The Ink Dry	Eve Owen	Sole production ‡
2020	Eve Owen	"After The Love"	Don't Let The Ink Dry	Eve Owen	Sole production ‡
2020	Eve Owen	"For Redemption"	Don't Let The Ink Dry	Eve Owen	Sole production ‡
2020	Eve Owen	"Bluebird"	Don't Let The Ink Dry	Eve Owen	Sole production ‡
2020	Eve Owen	"She Says"	Don't Let The Ink Dry	Eve Owen	Sole production ‡
2020	Eve Owen	"I Used To Dream In Color"	Don't Let The Ink Dry	Eve Owen	Sole production ‡
2020	Eve Owen	"So Still For You"	Don't Let The Ink Dry	Eve Owen	Sole production ‡
2020	Eve Owen	"Blue Moon"	Don't Let The Ink Dry	Eve Owen	Sole production ‡
2020	Eve Owen	"29 Daisy Sweetheart"	Don't Let The Ink Dry	Eve Owen	Sole production ‡
2020	Eve Owen	"A Lone Swan"	Don't Let The Ink Dry	Eve Owen	Sole production ‡
2020	Taylor Swift	"The 1"	Folklore	Taylor Swift	Sole production ‡
2020	Taylor Swift	"Cardigan"	Folklore	Taylor Swift	Sole production ‡
2020	Taylor Swift	"The Last Great American Dynasty"	Folklore	Taylor Swift	Sole production ‡
2020	Taylor Swift	"Exile" (featuring Bon Iver)	Folklore	—	Joe Alwyn
2020	Taylor Swift	"Seven"	Folklore	Taylor Swift	Sole production ‡
2020	Taylor Swift	"Invisible String"	Folklore	Taylor Swift	Sole production ‡
2020	Taylor Swift	"Mad Woman"	Folklore	Taylor Swift	Sole production ‡
2020	Taylor Swift	"Epiphany"	Folklore	Taylor Swift	Sole production ‡
2020	Taylor Swift	"Betty"	Folklore	—	Taylor Swift, Jack Antonoff
2020	Taylor Swift	"Peace"	Folklore	Taylor Swift	Sole production ‡
2020	Taylor Swift	"Hoax"	Folklore	Taylor Swift	Sole production ‡
2020	Taylor Swift	"Willow"	Evermore	Taylor Swift	Sole production ‡
2020	Taylor Swift	"Champagne Problems"	Evermore	—	Taylor Swift
2020	Taylor Swift	"'Tis the Damn Season"	Evermore	Taylor Swift	Sole production ‡
2020	Taylor Swift	"Tolerate It"	Evermore	Taylor Swift	Sole production ‡
2020	Taylor Swift	"No Body, No Crime" (featuring Haim)	Evermore	—	Taylor Swift
2020	Taylor Swift	"Happiness"	Evermore	Taylor Swift	Sole production ‡
2020	Taylor Swift	"Dorothea"	Evermore	Taylor Swift	Sole production ‡
2020	Taylor Swift	"Coney Island" (featuring the National)	Evermore	Taylor Swift, Joe Alwyn, Bryce Dessner	Bryce Dessner
2020	Taylor Swift	"Ivy"	Evermore	Taylor Swift, Jack Antonoff	Sole production ‡
2020	Taylor Swift	"Cowboy Like Me"	Evermore	Taylor Swift	Sole production ‡
2020	Taylor Swift	"Long Story Short"	Evermore	Taylor Swift	Sole production ‡
2020	Taylor Swift	"Marjorie"	Evermore	Taylor Swift	Sole production ‡
2020	Taylor Swift	"Closure"	Evermore	Taylor Swift	Sole production ‡
2020	Taylor Swift	"Evermore" (featuring Bon Iver)	Evermore	—	Taylor Swift
2020	Taylor Swift	"Right Where You Left Me"	Evermore	Taylor Swift	Sole production ‡
2020	Taylor Swift	"It's Time to Go"	Evermore	Taylor Swift	Sole production ‡
2021	Taylor Swift	"You All Over Me"	Fearless (Taylor's Version)	—	Taylor Swift
2021	Taylor Swift	"We Were Happy"	Fearless (Taylor's Version)	—	Taylor Swift
2021	Taylor Swift	"Better Man (Taylor's Version)"	Red (Taylor's Version)	—	Taylor Swift
2021	Taylor Swift	"Nothing New" (featuring Phoebe Bridgers)	Red (Taylor's Version)	—	Taylor Swift
2021	Taylor Swift	"I Bet You Think About Me" (featuring Chris Stapleton)	Red (Taylor's Version)	—	Taylor Swift
2021	Taylor Swift	"Run" (featuring Ed Sheeran)	Red (Taylor's Version)	—	Taylor Swift
2021	Gracie Abrams	"Rockland"	This Is What It Feels Like	Gracie Abrams	Sole production ‡
2021	Gracie Abrams	"Camden"	This Is What It Feels Like	Gracie Abrams	Blake Slatkin
2021	Gracie Abrams	"Hard to Sleep"	This Is What It Feels Like	Gracie Abrams	Sole production ‡
2021	Gracie Abrams	"Augusta"	This Is What It Feels Like	Gracie Abrams	Sole production ‡
2022	Taylor Swift	"Carolina"	Where the Crawdads Sing (Original Motion Picture Soundtrack)	—	Taylor Swift
2022	Taylor Swift	"The Great War"	Midnights (3am Edition)	Taylor Swift	Taylor Swift
2022	Taylor Swift	"High Infidelity"	Midnights (3am Edition)	Taylor Swift	Taylor Swift
2022	Taylor Swift	"Would've, Could've, Should've"	Midnights (3am Edition)	Taylor Swift	Taylor Swift
2022	Taylor Swift	"Hits Different"	Midnights (Deluxe edition)	Taylor Swift, Jack Antonoff	Taylor Swift, Jack Antonoff
2023	Gracie Abrams	"Best"	Good Riddance	Gracie Abrams	Sole production ‡
2023	Gracie Abrams	"I Know It Won't Work"	Good Riddance	Gracie Abrams	Matias Tellez
2023	Gracie Abrams	"Full Machine"	Good Riddance	Gracie Abrams	Sole production ‡
2023	Gracie Abrams	"Where Do We Go Now?"	Good Riddance	Gracie Abrams	Matias Tellez
2023	Gracie Abrams	"I Should Hate You"	Good Riddance	Gracie Abrams	Sole production ‡
2023	Gracie Abrams	"Will You Cry?"	Good Riddance	Gracie Abrams	Sole production ‡
2023	Gracie Abrams	"Amelie"	Good Riddance	Gracie Abrams	Sole production ‡
2023	Gracie Abrams	"Difficult"	Good Riddance	Gracie Abrams	Sole production ‡
2023	Gracie Abrams	"This Is What the Drugs Are For"	Good Riddance	Gracie Abrams	Sole production ‡
2023	Gracie Abrams	"Fault Line"	Good Riddance	Gracie Abrams	Sole production ‡
2023	Gracie Abrams	"The Blue"	Good Riddance	Gracie Abrams	Sole production ‡
2023	Gracie Abrams	"Right Now"	Good Riddance	Gracie Abrams, Brian Eno	Sole production ‡
2023	Gracie Abrams	"Block Me Out"	Good Riddance	Gracie Abrams	Sole production ‡
2023	Gracie Abrams	"Unsteady"	Good Riddance	Gracie Abrams	Sole production ‡
2023	Gracie Abrams	"405"	Good Riddance	Gracie Abrams	Sole production ‡
2023	Gracie Abrams	"Two People"	Good Riddance	Gracie Abrams, Delancey	Sole production ‡
2023	Ed Sheeran	"Boat"	-	Ed Sheeran	Sole production ‡
2023	Ed Sheeran	"Salt Water"	-	Ed Sheeran	Sole production ‡
2023	Ed Sheeran	"Eyes Closed"	-	—	Max Martin, Shellback, Fred Again
2023	Ed Sheeran	"Life Goes On"	-	—	Sole production ‡
2023	Ed Sheeran	"Dusty"	-	Ed Sheeran	Sole production ‡
2023	Ed Sheeran	"End of Youth"	-	—	Sole production ‡
2023	Ed Sheeran	"Colourblind"	-	—	Sole production ‡
2023	Ed Sheeran	"Curtains"	-	Ed Sheeran	Sole production ‡
2023	Ed Sheeran	"Borderline"	-	Ed Sheeran	Sole production ‡
2023	Ed Sheeran	"Spark"	-	Ed Sheeran	Sole production ‡
2023	Ed Sheeran	"Vega"	-	Ed Sheeran	Sole production ‡
2023	Ed Sheeran	"Sycamore"	-	Ed Sheeran	Sole production ‡
2023	Ed Sheeran	"No Strings"	-	Ed Sheeran	Sole production ‡
2023	Ed Sheeran	"The Hills of Aberfeldy"	-	—	Sole production ‡
2023	Ed Sheeran	"Wildflowers"	-	—	Sole production ‡
2023	Ed Sheeran	"Balance"	-	Ed Sheeran	Sole production ‡
2023	Ed Sheeran	"Stoned"	-	Ed Sheeran	Sole production ‡
2023	Ed Sheeran	"Fear"	-	Ed Sheeran	Sole production ‡
2023	Ed Sheeran	"Get Over It"	-	Ed Sheeran	Sole production ‡
2023	Ed Sheeran	"Toughest"	-	—	Sole production ‡
2023	Ed Sheeran	"Ours"	-	Ed Sheeran	Sole production ‡
2023	Ed Sheeran	"Moving"	-	Ed Sheeran	Sole production ‡
2023	Ed Sheeran	"Untitled"	-	Ed Sheeran	Sole production ‡
2023	Ed Sheeran	"Magical"	Autumn Variations	Ed Sheeran	Sole production ‡
2023	Ed Sheeran	"England"	Autumn Variations	Ed Sheeran	Sole production ‡
2023	Ed Sheeran	"Amazing"	Autumn Variations	Ed Sheeran	Sole production ‡
2023	Ed Sheeran	"Plastic Bag"	Autumn Variations	Ed Sheeran	Sole production ‡
2023	Ed Sheeran	"Blue"	Autumn Variations	—	Sole production ‡
2023	Ed Sheeran	"American Town"	Autumn Variations	Ed Sheeran	Sole production ‡
2023	Ed Sheeran	"That's on Me"	Autumn Variations	Ed Sheeran	Sole production ‡
2023	Ed Sheeran	"Page"	Autumn Variations	Ed Sheeran	Sole production ‡
2023	Ed Sheeran	"Midnight"	Autumn Variations	Ed Sheeran	Sole production ‡
2023	Ed Sheeran	"Spring"	Autumn Variations	Ed Sheeran, Bryce Dessner	Bryce Dessner
2023	Ed Sheeran	"Punchline"	Autumn Variations	Ed Sheeran	Sole production ‡
2023	Ed Sheeran	"When Will I Be Alright"	Autumn Variations	Ed Sheeran	Sole production ‡
2023	Ed Sheeran	"The Day I Was Born"	Autumn Variations	Ed Sheeran	Sole production ‡
2023	Ed Sheeran	"Head > Heels"	Autumn Variations	Ed Sheeran	Sole production ‡
2023	Taylor Swift	"Electric Touch" (featuring Fall Out Boy)	Speak Now (Taylor's Version)	—	Taylor Swift
2023	Taylor Swift	"When Emma Falls in Love"	Speak Now (Taylor's Version)	—	Taylor Swift
2023	Taylor Swift	"Foolish One"	Speak Now (Taylor's Version)	—	Taylor Swift
2023	Nanna	"Crybaby"	How To Start a Garden	—	Nanna Bryndís Hilmarsdóttir, Bjarni Þór Jensson
2023	Nanna	"Milk"	How To Start a Garden	Nanna Bryndís Hilmarsdóttir	Sole production ‡
2023	Nanna	"Seabed"	How To Start a Garden	Nanna Bryndís Hilmarsdóttir, Ragnar Þórhallsson	Nanna Bryndís Hilmarsdóttir
2024	Taylor Swift	"So Long, London"	The Tortured Poets Department	Taylor Swift	Taylor Swift
2024	Taylor Swift	"But Daddy I Love Him"	The Tortured Poets Department	Taylor Swift	Taylor Swift, Jack Antonoff
2024	Taylor Swift	"Loml"	The Tortured Poets Department	Taylor Swift	Taylor Swift
2024	Taylor Swift	"The Smallest Man Who Ever Lived"	The Tortured Poets Department	Taylor Swift	Taylor Swift
2024	Taylor Swift	"Clara Bow"	The Tortured Poets Department	Taylor Swift	Taylor Swift
2024	Taylor Swift	"The Albatross"	The Tortured Poets Department: The Anthology	Taylor Swift	Taylor Swift
2024	Taylor Swift	"Chloe or Sam or Sophia or Marcus"	The Tortured Poets Department: The Anthology	Taylor Swift	Taylor Swift
2024	Taylor Swift	"How Did It End?"	The Tortured Poets Department: The Anthology	Taylor Swift	Taylor Swift
2024	Taylor Swift	"So High School"	The Tortured Poets Department: The Anthology	Taylor Swift	Taylor Swift
2024	Taylor Swift	"I Hate It Here"	The Tortured Poets Department: The Anthology	Taylor Swift	Taylor Swift
2024	Taylor Swift	"Thank You Aimee"	The Tortured Poets Department: The Anthology	Taylor Swift	Taylor Swift, Jack Antonoff
2024	Taylor Swift	"The Prophecy"	The Tortured Poets Department: The Anthology	Taylor Swift	Taylor Swift
2024	Taylor Swift	"Cassandra"	The Tortured Poets Department: The Anthology	Taylor Swift	Taylor Swift
2024	Taylor Swift	"Peter"	The Tortured Poets Department: The Anthology	—	Taylor Swift
2024	Taylor Swift	"The Bolter"	The Tortured Poets Department: The Anthology	Taylor Swift	Taylor Swift
2024	Taylor Swift	"Robin"	The Tortured Poets Department: The Anthology	Taylor Swift	Taylor Swift
2024	Taylor Swift	"The Manuscript"	The Tortured Poets Department: The Anthology	—	Taylor Swift
2024	Bess Atwell	"Everyone Who's Not In Love With You Is Wrong"	Light Sleeper	Bess Atwell	Sole production ‡
2024	Bess Atwell	"Release Myself"	Light Sleeper	Bess Atwell	Sole production ‡
2024	Bess Atwell	"Sylvester"	Light Sleeper	Bess Atwell	Sole production ‡
2024	Bess Atwell	"Fan Favourite"	Light Sleeper	Bess Atwell	Sole production ‡
2024	Bess Atwell	"The Weeping"	Light Sleeper	Bess Atwell	Sole production ‡
2024	Bess Atwell	"Something Now"	Light Sleeper	Bess Atwell	Sole production ‡
2024	Bess Atwell	"Spinning Sun"	Light Sleeper	Bess Atwell	Sole production ‡
2024	Bess Atwell	"I Am Awake"	Light Sleeper	Bess Atwell	Sole production ‡
2024	Bess Atwell	"Crowds"	Light Sleeper	Bess Atwell	Sole production ‡
2024	Bess Atwell	"Light Sleeper"	Light Sleeper	Bess Atwell	Sole production ‡
2024	Gracie Abrams	"Felt Good About You"	The Secret of Us	Gracie Abrams	Gracie Abrams
2024	Gracie Abrams	"Risk"	The Secret of Us	—	Gracie Abrams
2024	Gracie Abrams	"Blowing Smoke"	The Secret of Us	Gracie Abrams, Audrey Hobert	Gracie Abrams
2024	Gracie Abrams	"I Love You, I'm Sorry"	The Secret of Us	Gracie Abrams, Audrey Hobert	Gracie Abrams
2024	Gracie Abrams	"Us" (featuring Taylor Swift)	The Secret of Us	Gracie Abrams, Taylor Swift	Gracie Abrams, Taylor Swift, Jack Antonoff
2024	Gracie Abrams	"Let It Happen"	The Secret of Us	Gracie Abrams, Audrey Hobert	Gracie Abrams
2024	Gracie Abrams	"Tough Love"	The Secret of Us	Gracie Abrams	Gracie Abrams
2024	Gracie Abrams	"I Knew It, I Know You"	The Secret of Us	—	Gracie Abrams
2024	Gracie Abrams	"Gave You I Gave You I"	The Secret of Us	Gracie Abrams	Gracie Abrams
2024	Gracie Abrams	"Normal Thing"	The Secret of Us	Gracie Abrams, Audrey Hobert	Gracie Abrams
2024	Gracie Abrams	"Good Luck Charlie"	The Secret of Us	Gracie Abrams	Gracie Abrams
2024	Gracie Abrams	"Free Now"	The Secret of Us	Gracie Abrams	Gracie Abrams
2024	Gracie Abrams	"Cool"	The Secret of Us (Deluxe)	Gracie Abrams	Gracie Abrams
2024	Gracie Abrams	"That's So True"	The Secret of Us (Deluxe)	—	Gracie Abrams, Julian Bunetta
2024	Gracie Abrams	"I Told You Things"	The Secret of Us (Deluxe)	Gracie Abrams	Gracie Abrams
2024	Gracie Abrams	"Packing It Up"	The Secret of Us (Deluxe)	Gracie Abrams	Gracie Abrams
2025	Laufey	"Castle in Hollywood"	A Matter of Time	Laufey	Laufey
2025	Laufey	"A Cautionary Tale"	A Matter of Time	Laufey	Laufey
2025	Florence and the Machine	"Everybody Scream"	Everybody Scream	—	Mark Bowen, James Ford, Florence Welch
2025	Brandi Carlile	"Human"	Returning to Myself	Brandi Carlile, Phil Hanseroth, Tim Hanseroth, Andrew Watt	Brandi Carlile, Andrew Watt, Justin Vernon
2025	Brandi Carlile	"A War With Time"	Returning to Myself	Brandi Carlile	Brandi Carlile, Andrew Watt
2025	Brandi Carlile	"Anniversary"	Returning to Myself	—	Brandi Carlile
2025	Brandi Carlile	"No One Knows Us"	Returning to Myself	Brandi Carlile	Brandi Carlile, Andrew Watt
2026	Mumford and Sons	"Here"	Prizefighter	Marcus Mumford, Ted Dwane, Ben Lovett	Mumford and Sons
2026	Mumford and Sons	"Rubber Band Man"	Prizefighter	Marcus Mumford, Ben Lovett, Ted Dwane, Brandi Carlile	Mumford and Sons
2026	Mumford and Sons	"The Banjo Song"	Prizefighter	Jon Bellion, Marcus Mumford, Ted Dwane, Ben Lovett	Mumford and Sons
2026	Mumford and Sons	"Run Together"	Prizefighter	Marcus Mumford, Ted Dwane, Ben Lovett, FINNEAS	Mumford and Sons
2026	Mumford and Sons	"Conversations With My Son (Gangster & Angels)"	Prizefighter	Marcus Mumford, Ted Dwane, Ben Lovett	Mumford and Sons
2026	Mumford and Sons	"Alleycat"	Prizefighter	Marcus Mumford, Ted Dwane, Ben Lovett	Mumford and Sons
2026	Mumford and Sons	"Prizefighter"	Prizefighter	Marcus Mumford, Ted Dwane, Ben Lovett, Justin Vernon	Mumford and Sons
2026	Mumford and Sons	"Begin Again"	Prizefighter	Marcus Mumford, Ted Dwane, Ben Lovett	Mumford and Sons
2026	Mumford and Sons	"Icarus"	Prizefighter	Marcus Mumford, Ted Dwane, Ben Lovett, Kevin Garrett	Mumford and Sons
2026	Mumford and Sons	"Stay"	Prizefighter	Marcus Mumford, Ted Dwane, Ben Lovett	Mumford and Sons
2026	Mumford and Sons	"Badlands"	Prizefighter	Marcus Mumford, Ted Dwane, Ben Lovett, Justin Vernon	Mumford and Sons
2026	Mumford and Sons	"Shadow Of A Man	Prizefighter	Marcus Mumford, Ted Dwane, Ben Lovett	Mumford and Sons
2026	Mumford and Sons	"I'll Tell You Everything"	Prizefighter	Marcus Mumford, Ted Dwane, Ben Lovett	Mumford and Sons
2026	Mumford and Sons	"Clover"	Prizefighter	Marcus Mumford, Ted Dwane, Ben Lovett	Mumford and Sons
2026	Noah Kahan	"End of August"	The Great Divide	Noah Kahan	Noah Kahan, Gabe Simon
2026	Noah Kahan	"Downfall"	The Great Divide	Noah Kahan, Gabe Simon	Noah Kahan, Gabe Simon
2026	Noah Kahan	"Lighthouse"	The Great Divide	Noah Kahan, Gabe Simon	Noah Kahan, Gabe Simon
2026	Noah Kahan	"Willing and Able"	The Great Divide	—	Noah Kahan, Gabe Simon, Noah Levine
2026	Noah Kahan	"Porch Light"	The Great Divide	Noah Kahan	Noah Kahan, Gabe Simon
2026	Noah Kahan	"Spoiled"	The Great Divide	—	Noah Kahan
2026	Noah Kahan	"A Few of Your Own"	The Great Divide	Noah Kahan, Gabe Simon	Noah Kahan, Gabe Simon
2026	Noah Kahan	"Orbiter"	The Great Divide	—	Noah Kahan, Gabe Simon
2026	Noah Kahan	"Dan"	The Great Divide	Noah Kahan	Noah Kahan, Gabe Simon
2026	Hudson Ingram	"Real Life"	The Long Way Home (Vol 1)	—	Jack Schrepferman
2026	Hudson Ingram	"Linger"	The Long Way Home (Vol 1)	—	J Moon
2026	Hudson Ingram	"Holy Ghost"	The Long Way Home (Vol 1)	Hudson Ingram	Sole production ‡
2026	Hudson Ingram	"Look How Lonely I Can Be"	The Long Way Home (Vol 1)	—	Sole production ‡
2026	Hudson Ingram	"Don't Get Me Started" (featuring Sydney Rose)	The Long Way Home (Vol 1)	Hudson Ingram, Sydney Rose, Jack Schrepferman	Adam Melchor, Jack Schrepferman
2026	Hudson Ingram	"Baby Just Be"	The Long Way Home (Vol 1)	—	Jack Schrepferman
2026	Hudson Ingram	"Wouldn't That Be Nice"	The Long Way Home (Vol 1)	—	Sole production ‡
2026	Gracie Abrams	"Hit the Wall"	Daughter from Hell	Gracie Abrams	Gracie Abrams
2026	Gracie Abrams	"Look at My Life"	Daughter from Hell	Gracie Abrams	Gracie Abrams, Dan Nigro
