= Life Goes On (Ed Sheeran song) =

2023 single by Ed Sheeran featuring Luke Combs

Single by Ed Sheeran

from the album −
- Released: 12 May 2023
- Length: 3:30
- Label: Asylum; Atlantic
- Songwriter: Ed Sheeran
- Producer: Aaron Dessner

Ed Sheeran singles chronology
"Boat" (2023)	"Life Goes On" (2023)	"A Beautiful Game" (2023)

Luke Combs singles chronology
"Different 'Round Here" (2023)	"Life Goes On" (2023)	"Where the Wild Things Are" (2023)

Music video
- "Life Goes On" on YouTube

"Life Goes On" is a song written and recorded by English singer-songwriter Ed Sheeran. It was released on 12 May 2023 through Asylum and Atlantic Records as the third single from his fifth studio album, − ("Subtract") after a duet version featuring American singer-songwriter Luke Combs was released that same day. The song was produced by Aaron Dessner. The official music video for the solo version of the song premiered alongside all the remaining videos for every song on the album on 5 May 2023, the same day the album was released.

== Background ==
Sheeran announced the song alongside the album on 1 March 2023, setting up several pre-order opportunities. On 11 May, he talked about Combs before hinting about the collaboration and added that he would love to transition into country music. Later that day, the two artists performed the duet version of the song at the 2023 Academy of Country Music Awards ceremony at the Ford Center at The Star in Frisco, Texas. In 2024 the song was used in ITV soap Emmerdale during the funeral of long term character Heath Hope.

== Composition and lyrics ==
The song was written about Sheeran's friend Jamal Edwards, after he died from arrhythmia. In the duet version of the song, he and Combs sing together: "To tell me how, how my life goes on with you gone? / I suppose I'll sink like a stone / If you leave me now, oh, the storms will roll / Easy come, hard go, then life goes on".

== Charts ==
Chart performance for "Life Goes On"
Chart (2023)	Peak position
Australia (ARIA)	23
Canada Hot 100 (Billboard)	27
Global 200 (Billboard)	95
Ireland (IRMA)	19
New Zealand (Recorded Music NZ)	33
Sweden Heatseeker (Sverigetopplistan)	15
UK Singles (OCC)	29
US Billboard Hot 100	66
US Country Airplay (Billboard)	59
US Hot Country Songs (Billboard)	47

== Certifications ==
Certifications for "Life Goes On"
Region	Certification	Certified units/sales
Australia (ARIA)	Platinum	70,000^{‡}
Canada (Music Canada)	Platinum	80,000^{‡}
New Zealand (RMNZ)	Platinum	30,000^{‡}
United Kingdom (BPI)	Silver	200,000^{‡}
^{‡} Sales+streaming figures based on certification alone.
