= − (album) =

2023 studio album by Ed Sheeran

Studio album by Ed Sheeran
- Released: 5 May 2023
- Recorded: 2022
- Genre: Folk-pop
- Length: 48:02
- Labels: Asylum; Atlantic
- Producers: Aaron Dessner; Fred Again; Max Martin; Shellback

Ed Sheeran chronology
= (2021)	− (2023)	Autumn Variations (2023)

Singles from −
- 1. "Eyes Closed" Released: 24 March 2023; 2. "Boat" Released: 21 April 2023; 3. "Life Goes On" Released: 12 May 2023

− (Subtract) is the sixth studio album by English singer-songwriter Ed Sheeran. It was released on 5 May 2023 through Asylum and Atlantic Records. A mostly acoustic album, production was handled by Aaron Dessner on every track, alongside Fred Again, Max Martin and Shellback, who all joined him to help produce lead single "Eyes Closed"; while "Boat" and "Life Goes On" served as the respective second and third singles of the album. It was also released as a visual album, with videos for twelve of the album's fourteen tracks (the videos for "Eyes Closed" and "Boat" were already released prior to −) premiering on the album's release date. The album serves as the follow-up to Sheeran's previous album, = (2021), and is his final mathematical-themed album.

The album received generally positive reviews from critics. It debuted at number one in Australia, Austria, Belgium, the Netherlands, France, Germany, Ireland, New Zealand, Poland, Sweden, Switzerland, and the United Kingdom. It also reached the top ten in eleven other countries including United States, Canada, Italy and Spain.

== Background ==
Ed Sheeran announced the album title, tracklist and release date on 1 March 2023 through all social media platforms. He also announced a mini-European tour from 23 March to 2 April, to complement the release of the album's lead single. It was produced and co-written by Aaron Dessner of the indie rock band the National, who also produced Taylor Swift's albums, Folklore and Evermore, both released in 2020. Sheeran and Dessner wrote over thirty songs together during a month-long studio session, which was eventually cut down to the album's fourteen tracks. − serves as the final mathematical-themed album by Sheeran. On 29 April 2023, Sheeran announced a series of private shows in North America as part of a mini tour for the album.

== Critical reception ==
Professional ratings
Aggregate scores
Source	Rating
AnyDecentMusic?	5.5/10
Metacritic	65/100
Review scores
Source	Rating
AllMusic	3/5 stars
Clash	7/10
The Guardian	4/5 stars
The Independent	3/5 stars
The Line of Best Fit	4/10
NME	3/5 stars
The Observer	3/5 stars
Pitchfork	3.8/10
Sputnikmusic	1.5/5
The Telegraph	5/5 stars

− received a score of 65 out of 100 based on 14 critics' reviews at review aggregator Metacritic, indicating "generally favourable" reception. Alexis Petridis of The Guardian called it "easily his best ever album", an "insular record" on which Sheeran's "crowd-pleasing excesses are nowhere to be seen". Petridis acclaimed Sheeran's work with Aaron Dessner, who provides "atmospheric and beautifully done" as well as "understated string arrangements; twinkling, spectral synthesisers; gentle breezes of feedback and reverb-drenched electric guitars". Neil McCormick of The Telegraph gave the album five out of five stars, describing it as "a fluid, emotional, anxious and atmospheric album of therapeutic self-healing, in which the raw immediacy of Sheeran's feelings takes priority, shaking and warping material in subtle, twisty and deeply personal directions".

Nick Levine of NME wrote that − "definitely feels different. It's doleful and downbeat, melancholy and heartfelt, and doesn't contain anything as crass as 2017's cod-Irish folk song 'Galway Girl'". Levine also found that the album "feels like a warm but cautious hug from a sensitive friend – Dessner gives Sheeran space to say what's on his mind without trying to crowd him", also complimenting Sheeran's lyrics' "striking specificity". Robin Murray of Clash judged the "parallels" to Taylor Swift's Folklore, also produced by Dessner, to be "too neat to miss: removing the gloss, exposing the songwriting underneath, and swapping pop for a more 'serious' artform". Murray wrote that the "results are affecting, but – and this remains Ed Sheeran, after all – not devoid of schmaltz". At Rolling Stone, Maura Johnston said the album is "deliberately arranged, providing solid ground for Sheeran's meditations on a horrific collection of events", while his "lyricism returns to the spotlight, bolstered by finely detailed music that complements his crystalline lyrics and close-confidant delivery." Exclaim! listed the album cover as 10th worst of the year, writing: "the platonic ideal of guy-at-the-party-with-an-acoustic-guitar returns with an image of his own face smeared in what we truly can't believe is not butter. Given how flavourless his music is, we assume it's unsalted."

The Independent's Roisin O'Connor described − as "a departure, of sorts, for the better", on which Dessner brings his "anti–major chord, damper-pedalled piano style", "which in turn harks back to the acoustic-leaning sound of Sheeran's earliest work". O'Connor felt that "Lyrically, the album does fall short, but then Sheeran has spent over a decade trading in vague yet universal issues" although "he's trying his best to open up". Steven Loftin of The Line of Best Fit opined that while the album "doesn't follow [Sheeran's] usual routine", "it certainly doesn't fall far from the tree", and that it "throws into question why he doesn't at least attempt some form of progress" as he "seems happy to play to the masses with his own by-the-book formula that even when it employs the hottest new indie producer, still feels lost". The Observer's noted critic Kitty Empire regards the album as a visceral one dealing with mental health issues in a "coping to not coping" adult way. From The New York Times, Jon Pareles stated "They're sturdy songs, even as Sheeran sings about fragile emotions", whilst "Obviously, Sheeran doesn't worry about verbal clichés – though in these songs, the sorrowful tone makes them sound more unguarded than banal."

== Commercial performance ==
In the UK, − debuted as Sheeran's sixth number one on the UK Albums Chart with 76,000 chart units, becoming the fastest-selling album of 2023 until then. Physical sales constituted 71% of the figure, and it was also the best-selling album on the vinyl format during the week. The album entered at number two on the US Billboard 200 with 112,000 album-equivalent units, including 81,000 pure sales, during its first week. The sales figure outdid any sales week of Sheeran's last two albums and, at the time, marked the 10th-largest sales week of 2023 for any album. In Canada, it peaked at number two.

The album reached number one in Australia. In New Zealand, the album charted at number one. Elsewhere, it peaked at number one in Austria, Belgium, France, Germany, Ireland, the Netherlands, Poland, Scotland, Sweden, and Switzerland.

== Awards and nominations ==
The album was nominated for the Grammy Award for Best Pop Vocal Album at the 66th Annual Grammy Awards.

== Track listing ==
All tracks are written by Ed Sheeran and Aaron Dessner, except where noted; all songs produced by Dessner, with "Eyes Closed" also produced by Fred Again, Max Martin and Shellback and "F64" only produced by Fred Again.

Standard edition
No.	Title	Writer(s)	Length
1.	"Boat"		3:05
2.	"Salt Water"		3:59
3.	"Eyes Closed"	Sheeran, Max Martin, Johan Schuster, Fred Gibson	3:14
4.	"Life Goes On"	Sheeran	3:30
5.	"Dusty"		3:42
6.	"End of Youth"	Sheeran	3:51
7.	"Colourblind"	Sheeran	3:29
8.	"Curtains"		3:44
9.	"Borderline"		3:57
10.	"Spark"		3:34
11.	"Vega"		2:58
12.	"Sycamore"		2:50
13.	"No Strings"		2:54
14.	"The Hills of Aberfeldy"	Sheeran, Foy Vance	3:15
Total length:			48:02

Deluxe edition
No.	Title	Writer(s)	Length
15.	"Wildflowers"	Sheeran	2:58
16.	"Stoned"		3:17
17.	"Toughest"	Sheeran	3:33
18.	"Moving"		3:35
Total length:			61:25

Notes

- The deluxe vinyl edition includes "Balance", "Fear", "Get Over It", and "Ours".
- The Japanese edition includes "F64".
- Album's actual title on streaming is a hyphen-minus ('-'). For better legibility and consistency, a minus sign ('−') is used in the article

== Personnel ==
Musicians

- Aaron Dessner – acoustic guitar (1–3, 8, 12, 17, 18), hi-string guitar (1–3, 17), grand piano (1), bass guitar (2–6, 8, 12, 15, 17), bass synthesizer (2, 3, 5–11, 13, 14, 17), drum programming (2, 3, 5, 6, 8, 10–13, 15, 17), electric guitar (2, 3, 5, 7, 8, 10, 11, 15, 17), piano (2, 3, 5, 6, 9, 10, 13–17), Juno synthesizer (2, 5, 6, 8, 9, 11, 13, 15, 17), synthesizer (2, 5–7, 9, 11–13, 16, 17), Prophet synthesizer (2, 7, 10, 12, 15, 16), tambourine (2, 8, 10, 11, 13, 17), Wurlitzer (2), shaker (4, 8, 10, 17), Mellotron (5, 6, 8, 9, 11–13, 17), percussion (5, 6), programming (7), upright piano (7, 8), synthesizer piano (11); cymbals, Minimoog, organ (12); electric piano (16)
- Benjamin Lanz – synthesizer (5, 7), trombone (11, 12)
- Bryce Dessner – orchestration (2, 6, 8, 10, 12, 13, 17), synthesizer (2, 6, 8, 13, 17), Omnisphere synthesizer (10, 12)
- Clarice Jensen – cello (2, 6, 8, 10, 12, 13, 17)
- Dave Nelson – trombone (5, 8, 10, 12, 13, 17)
- Ed Sheeran – vocals (all tracks), backing vocals (tracks 1, 2, 5, 7–12, 14–18), acoustic guitar (1, 4, 6, 14), electric guitar (5, 18)
- Fred – backing vocals, bass guitar, drums, electric guitar, keyboards, programming (3)
- J.T. Bates – drums (5, 6, 9–11, 13)
- James Krivchenia – drums (5, 12), percussion (5), shaker (12)
- James McAlister – drum programming (1, 2, 6, 8, 11), synthesizer (1, 3, 6, 11, 16, 17), Moog (3, 16), shaker (3), drums (5, 8, 15), samples (5, 7), Juno synthesizer (8); lyra, Prophet synthesizer (16)
- Jason Treuting – percussion (8)
- Kyle Resnick – whistle (2), trumpet (11, 12)
- Lisa Hannigan – backing vocals (15, 17)
- Max Martin – programming (3)
- Reid Jenkins – violin (13)
- Rob Moose – orchestration, viola, violin (1, 3, 4, 5, 7, 9, 11, 14, 18); cello, (1, 3, 5, 7, 9, 11, 14, 18), piano (4)
- Shellback – programming (3)
- Thomas Bartlett – piano (4, 6, 8, 10, 14), synthesizer (4, 8, 9, 11, 12, 14, 16), Prophet synthesizer (4, 11), Rhodes solo (4, 16), Mellotron (6, 10), bass synthesizer (16)
- Yuki Numata Resnick – violin (2, 6, 8, 10, 12, 13, 17)

Technical

- Aaron Dessner – production (all tracks), engineering (11, 12), recording (2, 6–8, 14), additional engineering (2, 6–10, 14)
- Alex Proctor – recording, additional engineering (7)
- Ashton Miranda – engineering, recording (18)
- Bella Blasko – engineering (2, 3, 5–17), recording (2, 5–8, 13, 17)
- Benjamin Lanz – recording, additional engineering (5, 7)
- Ber Quinn – recording, additional engineering (15)
- Clarice Jensen – engineering (13), recording (2, 6, 8, 13, 17), additional engineering (2, 6, 8, 10, 12, 17)
- Cormac O'Kane – engineering, recording (3)
- Dave Nelson – recording (5, 8, 13, 17), additional engineering (5, 8, 10, 12, 13, 17)
- Fred – production (3)
- J.T. Bates – recording, additional engineering (6, 7)
- James McAlister – recording, additional engineering (1, 8, 15–17)
- Jason Treuting – recording, additional engineering (8)
- Jonathan Low – mixing (1, 2, 4–18), engineering (all tracks), recording (1–8, 13–18)
- Kyle Resnick – recording (2, 6, 8, 13, 17), additional engineering (2, 6, 8, 10, 12, 13, 17)
- Lisa Hannigan – recording, additional engineering (17)
- Mark "Spike" Stent – mixing (3)
- Matt Wolach – mixing assistance (3)
- Max Martin – production (3)
- Michael Ilbert – engineering, recording (3)
- Randy Merrill – mastering
- Reid Jenkins – additional engineering (13)
- Richard Brown – recording (3)
- Rob Moose – recording (1, 3–5, 7, 14, 18), additional engineering (1, 4, 5, 7, 9, 11, 14, 18)
- Shellback – production (3)
- Thomas Bartlett – recording, additional engineering (4, 16)

== Charts ==
=== Weekly charts ===
Weekly chart performance for −
Chart (2023)	Peak position
Australian Albums (ARIA)	1
Austrian Albums (Ö3 Austria)	1
Belgian Albums (Ultratop Flanders)	1
Belgian Albums (Ultratop Wallonia)	1
Canadian Albums (Billboard)	2
Croatian International Albums (HDU)	1
Czech Albums (ČNS IFPI)	9
Danish Albums (Hitlisten)	2
Dutch Albums (Album Top 100)	1
Finnish Albums (Suomen virallinen lista)	5
French Albums (SNEP)	1
German Albums (Offizielle Top 100)	1
Hungarian Albums (MAHASZ)	16
Icelandic Albums (Tónlistinn)	6
Irish Albums (Official Charts)	1
Italian Albums (FIMI)	2
Japanese Albums (Oricon)	8
Japanese Combined Albums (Oricon)	8
Japanese Hot Albums (Billboard Japan)	7
Lithuanian Albums (AGATA)	26
New Zealand Albums (RMNZ)	1
Norwegian Albums (VG-lista)	2
Polish Albums (ZPAV)	1
Portuguese Albums (AFP)	2
Scottish Albums (Official Charts)	1
Slovak Albums (ČNS IFPI)	5
Spanish Albums (Promusicae)	4
Swedish Albums (Sverigetopplistan)	1
Swiss Albums (Schweizer Hitparade)	1
UK Albums (Official Charts)	1
UK Album Downloads (Official Charts)	1
US Billboard 200	2

=== Year-end charts ===
Year-end chart performance for −
Chart (2023)	Position
US Billboard 200	169
German Albums (Offizielle Top 100)	18
Austrian Albums (Ö3 Austria)	52
Swiss Albums (Schweizer Hitparade)	20
Dutch Albums (Album Top 100)	25
UK Albums (OCC)	23
Belgian Albums (Ultratop Flanders)	42
Belgian Albums (Ultratop Wallonia)	100
French Albums (SNEP)	75
Australian Albums (ARIA)	28
Danish Albums (Hitlisten)	85

== Certifications ==
Certifications for −
Region	Certification	Certified units/sales
Canada (Music Canada)	Platinum	80,000^{‡}
Denmark (IFPI Danmark)	Gold	10,000^{‡}
France (SNEP)	Gold	50,000^{‡}
New Zealand (RMNZ)	Platinum	15,000^{‡}
United Kingdom (BPI)	Gold	217,381
^{‡} Sales+streaming figures based on certification alone.

== Release history ==
Release history and formats for −
Region	Date	Format(s)	Edition(s)	Label	Ref.
Various	5 May 2023	Cassette; CD; digital download; streaming; vinyl	Standard	Asylum; Atlantic	
Various	5 May 2023	CD; digital download; streaming; vinyl	Deluxe	Asylum; Atlantic	
