= Eyes Closed (Ed Sheeran song) =

2023 single by Ed Sheeran

Single by Ed Sheeran

from the album −
- Released: 24 March 2023
- Genre: Folk pop
- Length: 3:14
- Label: Asylum; Atlantic
- Songwriters: Ed Sheeran; Max Martin; Johan Schuster; Fred Gibson
- Producers: Max Martin; Shellback; Fred Again; Aaron Dessner

Ed Sheeran singles chronology
"F64" (2023)	"Eyes Closed" (2023)	"Boat" (2023)

Music video
- "Eyes Closed" on YouTube

"Eyes Closed" is a song by English singer-songwriter Ed Sheeran. It was released on 24 March 2023 through Asylum and Atlantic Records as the lead single from his fifth studio album, −. The song was produced by Max Martin, Shellback, Fred Again, and Aaron Dessner, and the former three producers wrote it with Sheeran. "Eyes Closed" debuted and peaked at the top of the UK Singles Chart.

== Background and promotion ==
"Eyes Closed" started in 2018 as a collaboration between Sheeran and pop producer Max Martin. Originally a love song, it was reworked in 2022 by Sheeran and Dessner, with a different instrumentation and lyrics detailing the loss of a dear friend. Sheeran announced the song alongside the album on 1 March 2023, setting up several pre-order opportunities. On 9 March, he shared a preview of the song on his socials, performing parts of the song on an acoustic guitar and a piano. In a TikTok posted on the same day, it was revealed that it will be the lead single of the album.

The song pays tribute to his former music entrepreneur and close friend Jamal Edwards, who died in February 2022 from a drug overdose. He had been exchanging text messages with Edwards about an upcoming music video, while having dinner with Taylor Swift and Joe Alwyn, and then he learned the next day that his best friend was gone. Talking about the loss, Sheeran revealed, "Blue was Jamal's colour, but now is all I feel. And I guess music helps heal, so I'm dancing with my eyes closed to try get through it". Edwards' funeral was the first one Sheeran had ever attended in which the deceased was not cremated, which means he remembers the moment he placed dirt on his friend's grave. In addition to the death of Edwards, his wife Cherry was diagnosed that same month with a tumour that could not be operated on until after she had delivered their second child in June, and then his friend Shane Warne died in early March. He has cited his feelings of "fear, depression and anxiety" as the inspiration behind the song.

The song was prominently featured in the first trailer of Sheeran's Disney+ documentary, Ed Sheeran: The Sum of It All, which explores details of his private life.

== Composition and lyrics ==
In the song, Sheeran's voice has a rich timbre and his falsetto softens when he sings the refrain on the chorus, "I keep dancing with my eyes closed". Writing for The Guardian, Alexis Petridis noted that the song featured percussive guitar playing and that the chorus was "insistent" and "radio friendly". Originally written as a breakup song, it took on new meaning after Sheeran suffered personal losses. The lyrics feel "more personal" and "explicitly linked to a very specific event", that of the death of Jamal Edwards.

== Critical reception ==
Roisin O'Connor of The Independent, rated the song four stars and wrote that "much of the emotional heft" of the song was in Sheeran's delivery. In a mixed review, The Guardian's Alexis Petridis gave the song three stars out of five, writing that "you already know if you'll love it, loathe it with every fiber of your being" or "simply marvel at its effectiveness without being moved."

== Music video ==
The Harvey-inspired music video for "Eyes Closed" was released alongside the single. Directed by Mia Barnes, the video depicts Sheeran being followed by a big blue monster that only he can see during his night out, representing his grief. He soon finds other people with their own monsters, before finally facing his own and singing the song's final line, causing it to disappear.

== Live performances ==
"Eyes Closed" was performed on 1 April 2023 on The Jonathan Ross Show and on 7 May on American Idol.

== Accolades ==
Awards and nominations for "Eyes Closed"
Organization	Year	Category	Result	Ref.
MTV Video Music Awards	2023	Best Pop	Nominated	
MTV Video Music Awards	2023	Best Cinematography	Nominated	
Global Awards	2024	Best Song	Nominated	

== Charts ==
=== Weekly charts ===
Weekly chart performance for "Eyes Closed"
Chart (2023–2024)	Peak position
Argentina Hot 100 (Billboard)	91
Australia (ARIA)	6
Austria (Ö3 Austria Top 40)	7
Belarus Airplay (TopHit)	94
Belgium (Ultratop 50 Flanders)	2
Belgium (Ultratop 50 Wallonia)	2
Brazil Airplay (Crowley Charts)	62
Brazil International Pop Airplay (Crowley Charts)	4
Canada Hot 100 (Billboard)	4
Canada AC (Billboard)	1
Canada CHR/Top 40 (Billboard)	2
Canada Hot AC (Billboard)	1
CIS Airplay (TopHit)	20
Czech Republic Airplay (ČNS IFPI)	7
Czech Republic Singles Digital (ČNS IFPI)	72
Denmark (Tracklisten)	8
Estonia Airplay (TopHit)	1
Finland (Suomen virallinen lista)	31
France (SNEP)	32
Germany (GfK)	13
Global 200 (Billboard)	14
Hungary (Rádiós Top 40)	27
Hungary (Single Top 40)	16
Ireland (IRMA)	4
Italy (FIMI)	45
Japan Hot 100 (Billboard)	92
Latvia Airplay (LaIPA)	1
Lithuania (AGATA)	51
Lithuania Airplay (TopHit)	2
Luxembourg (Billboard)	13
Netherlands (Dutch Top 40)	8
Netherlands (Single Top 100)	12
New Zealand (Recorded Music NZ)	10
Norway (VG-lista)	11
Poland (Polish Airplay Top 100)	2
Poland (Polish Streaming Top 100)	58
Portugal (AFP)	87
Romania Airplay (TopHit)	27
Romania TV Airplay (Media Forest)	3
Russia Airplay (TopHit)	76
San Marino Airplay (SMRTV Top 50)	1
Serbia Airplay (Radiomonitor)	18
Singapore (RIAS)	21
Slovakia Airplay (ČNS IFPI)	3
Slovakia Singles Digital (ČNS IFPI)	41
South Korea (Circle)	139
Suriname (Nationale Top 40)	2
Sweden (Sverigetopplistan)	10
Switzerland (Schweizer Hitparade)	7
UK Singles (Official Charts)	1
Ukraine Airplay (TopHit)	154
US Billboard Hot 100	19
US Adult Contemporary (Billboard)	5
US Adult Pop Airplay (Billboard)	1
US Dance Airplay (Billboard)	34
US Pop Airplay (Billboard)	7
Venezuela Airplay (Record Report)	81
Vietnam Hot 100 (Billboard)	93

=== Monthly charts ===
Monthly chart performance for "Eyes Closed"
Chart (2023)	Position
CIS Airplay (TopHit)	21
Estonia Airplay (TopHit)	1
Lithuania Airplay (TopHit)	1
Romania Airplay (TopHit)	35
Russia Airplay (TopHit)	78
South Korea (Circle)	168

=== Year-end charts ===
2023 year-end chart performance for "Eyes Closed"
Chart (2023)	Position
Australia (ARIA)	73
Belgium (Ultratop 50 Flanders)	17
Belgium (Ultratop 50 Wallonia)	8
Canada (Canadian Hot 100)	17
CIS Airplay (TopHit)	69
Denmark (Tracklisten)	59
Estonia Airplay (TopHit)	2
Global 200 (Billboard)	132
Lithuania Airplay (TopHit)	10
Netherlands (Dutch Top 40)	26
Netherlands (Single Top 100)	51
Poland (Polish Airplay Top 100)	50
Romania Airplay (TopHit)	132
Sweden (Sverigetopplistan)	99
Switzerland (Schweizer Hitparade)	67
UK Singles (OCC)	31
US Billboard Hot 100	64
US Adult Contemporary (Billboard)	8
US Adult Top 40 (Billboard)	6
US Mainstream Top 40 (Billboard)	21

2024 year-end chart performance for "Eyes Closed"
Chart (2024)	Position
Estonia Airplay (TopHit)	149
US Adult Contemporary (Billboard)	10

== Certifications ==
Certifications for "Eyes Closed"
Region	Certification	Certified units/sales
Australia (ARIA)	Platinum	70,000^{‡}
Austria (IFPI Austria)	Platinum	30,000^{‡}
Canada (Music Canada)	2× Platinum	160,000^{‡}
Denmark (IFPI Danmark)	Platinum	90,000^{‡}
France (SNEP)	Platinum	200,000^{‡}
Italy (FIMI)	Platinum	100,000^{‡}
New Zealand (RMNZ)	Platinum	30,000^{‡}
Poland (ZPAV)	Platinum	50,000^{‡}
Spain (Promusicae)	Gold	30,000^{‡}
Switzerland (IFPI Switzerland)	Platinum	20,000^{‡}
United Kingdom (BPI)	Platinum	600,000^{‡}
Streaming
Sweden (GLF)	Platinum	8,000,000^{†}
^{‡} Sales+streaming figures based on certification alone.^{†} Streaming-only figures based on certification alone.

== Release history ==
Release history and formats for "Eyes Closed"
Region	Date	Format(s)	Version	Label	Ref.
Various	24 March 2023	Digital download; streaming	Original	Asylum; Atlantic; Warner	
United Kingdom	24 March 2023	CD single	Original	Asylum; Atlantic; Warner	
Italy	24 March 2023	Radio airplay	Original	Warner	
Various	27 March 2023	Digital download; streaming	Piano	Asylum; Atlantic; Warner	
United States	27 March 2023	Hot adult contemporary radio	Original	Atlantic	
United States	28 March 2023	Contemporary hit radio	Original	Atlantic	
Canada	19 April 2023	CD single	Piano	Atlantic	
Various	19 May 2023	Remix	Lost Frequencies remix	Atlantic	
