= F64 (song) =

2023 single by Ed Sheeran

Single by Ed Sheeran
- Released: 19 January 2023
- Genre: Pop-rap
- Length: 3:25
- Label: Asylum; Atlantic
- Songwriters: Ed Sheeran; Fred Gibson; David Omoregie; Jonathan Awote-Mensah; Daniel Benson; Vata Sonzi
- Producer: Fred Again

Ed Sheeran singles chronology
"Call on Me" (2022)	"F64" (2023)	"Eyes Closed" (2023)

Music video
- "F64" on YouTube

"F64" is a song by English singer-songwriter Ed Sheeran. It was released on 19 January 2023 through Asylum and Atlantic Records as a single. Sheeran wrote the song with producer Fred Gibson, alongside rappers Dave and Jae5, and Daniel Benson and Vata Sonzi. It is a freestyle rap that sees Sheeran pay homage to his late friend, English music entrepreneur and director Jamal Edwards, who died in February 2022 due to cardiac arrhythmia. The song was later included in the Japanese edition of Sheeran's sixth studio album -.

== Background ==
The description for the official music video of the song on YouTube reads:

Last year we lost our leader and founder Jamal Edwards, MBE. It has been the hardest thing in the world to process as he was the driving force behind so much and such a bright light in all of our lives here at team SB. Jamal had a unique connection with artists and creatives and was happiest when he was connecting and creating. His journey began locally but took him on a global adventure on the way forming unique bonds. One of these bonds was with long-time friend and brother Ed Sheeran. From a tweet to a long-lasting brotherhood. With the return of the flagship series F64, Ed Sheeran kicks us off with a tribute to Jamal. At SBTV, we will continue to push and support British artists, bringing artists together in new ways. Jamal's legacy will live on through his incredible achievements, SBTV and the Jamal Edwards Self Belief Trust.

== Composition and lyrics ==
Over piano-backed production, Sheeran raps about his memories with Edwards and express that he misses him and explains what has been going on in his life since his death: "Yo Jam, this is a letter to you / It's been a while, but it's been hard for me to get in the booth / Since we last spoke, I've become a father of two / Trying to live life with a smile, but that's been harder to do / 'Cause all I wanna do is talk about you". He emotionally continues as he shows the pain that he felt since his passing: "Therapy sessions, digging deep in depression / I got a life full of blessings, but this just breaks my fucking heart / Lately I've been crying so much my lungs ache, teardrops all over my shirt are bloodstained".

== Music video ==
The official music video for "F64" premiered alongside the release of the song on 19 January 2023. It sees Sheeran standing by candles lit up around the Stamford Bridge stadium, the home stadium of Chelsea F.C., Edwards' favorite football team.

== Charts ==
Chart performance for "F64"
Chart (2023)	Peak position
Ireland (IRMA)	64
New Zealand Hot Singles (RMNZ)	5
Sweden (Sverigetopplistan)	65
Switzerland (Schweizer Hitparade)	77
UK Singles (OCC)	50
UK Hip Hop/R&B (OCC)	24
