= Curtains (song) =

2023 promotional song by Ed Sheeran

Song by Ed Sheeran

from the album −
- Released: 5 May 2023
- Length: 3:44
- Label: Asylum; Atlantic
- Songwriters: Ed Sheeran; Aaron Dessner
- Producer: Aaron Dessner

Music video
- "Curtains" on YouTube

"Curtains" is a song by English singer-songwriter Ed Sheeran. It was released on 5 May 2023 through Asylum and Atlantic Records as the eighth track from his fifth studio album, − ("Subtract"). Sheeran wrote the song with producer Aaron Dessner. He announced the song alongside the album on 1 March 2023, setting up several pre-order opportunities.

== Composition and lyrics ==
The song is lyrically about putting in the work to come to a peace of mind. Sheeran shows a sense of uncertainty and mortality while pushing through tough times. The song also contains electric guitar and is about getting through grief. It is built around a minor chord progression composed by Aaron Dessner and is reminiscent of Avril Lavigne-style grunge.

== Critical reception ==
Nick Levine of NME felt that the song "has a springier rhythm, plus rock guitars that recall The Cranberries and a genuinely anthemic chorus, sounds like a future single". Maura Johnston of Rolling Stone felt that it "turns a game of hide and seek into a metaphor for dragging oneself out of life's muck".

== Music video ==
The official music video for "Curtains" premiered alongside the remaining videos for every song on the album on 5 May 2023, the same day that the album was released, as part of its visual album. Taking place in a forest, the video depicts Sheeran coming across a group of people running around him. The video alternates between blue, where Sheeran is disoriented and tries to avoid other people, and orange, where Ed is joyful and has fun with them, mists. As the video ends with the mist clearing up and Sheeran and everybody else walking away, a brief shot shows Sheeran in the blue mist being happy too.

== Charts ==
Chart performance for "Curtains"
Chart (2023)	Peak position
Australia (ARIA)	24
Belgium (Ultratop 50 Flanders)	31
Canada Hot 100 (Billboard)	61
Germany (GfK)	87
Global 200 (Billboard)	73
Ireland (IRMA)	23
Netherlands (Single Top 100)	61
New Zealand (Recorded Music NZ)	25
Portugal (AFP)	200
Sweden (Sverigetopplistan)	40
Switzerland (Schweizer Hitparade)	33
UK Singles (Official Charts)	16
US Billboard Hot 100	97
