= Boat (Ed Sheeran song) =

2023 single by Ed Sheeran

Single by Ed Sheeran

from the album −
- Released: 21 April 2023
- Length: 3:05
- Label: Asylum; Atlantic
- Songwriters: Ed Sheeran; Aaron Dessner
- Producer: Aaron Dessner

Ed Sheeran singles chronology
"Eyes Closed" (2023)	"Boat" (2023)	"Life Goes On" (2023)

Music video
- "Boat" on YouTube

"Boat" is a song by English singer-songwriter Ed Sheeran. It was released on 21 April 2023 through Asylum and Atlantic Records as the second single from his fifth studio album, − ("Subtract"). Sheeran wrote the song with producer Aaron Dessner.

== Background and promotion ==
Sheeran announced the song alongside the album on 1 March 2023, setting up several pre-order opportunities. On 17 April, he shared a preview of the song on his socials, with a clip of its accompanying music video, in which he said that it was the first song that he had recorded for his new album.

== Composition and lyrics ==
In a press release on the same day that the song was released, Sheeran used the song serves as "a metaphor for depression; a track that combats the struggles of feeling very low and not knowing how to break the cycle". The song is led by a soft guitar melody, in which he shows his emotional strength as he sings on the chorus: "The more that I love, the less that I feel / The times that I jumped never were real / They say that all scars will heal, but I know / Maybe, I won't / But the waves won't break my boat / But the waves won't brеak my boat".

== Music video ==
The official music video for "Boat", directed by Mia Barnes, was released alongside the song on 21 April 2023. It sees Sheeran around waves in a beach in the United Kingdom. When he enters the ocean, he gets swallowed by the waves as he tries to go to the shore.

== Charts ==
Chart performance for "Boat"
Chart (2023)	Peak position
Australia (ARIA)	48
Canada Hot 100 (Billboard)	71
Canada Hot AC (Billboard)	42
Global 200 (Billboard)	125
Ireland (IRMA)	21
Netherlands (Single Top 100)	86
New Zealand (Recorded Music NZ)	23
South Korea BGM (Circle)	38
South Korea Download (Circle)	126
Sweden (Sverigetopplistan)	69
Switzerland (Schweizer Hitparade)	35
UK Singles (OCC)	15
US Bubbling Under Hot 100 (Billboard)	20
