= Jamal Edwards =

British businessman (1990–2022)

Jamal Edwards MBE
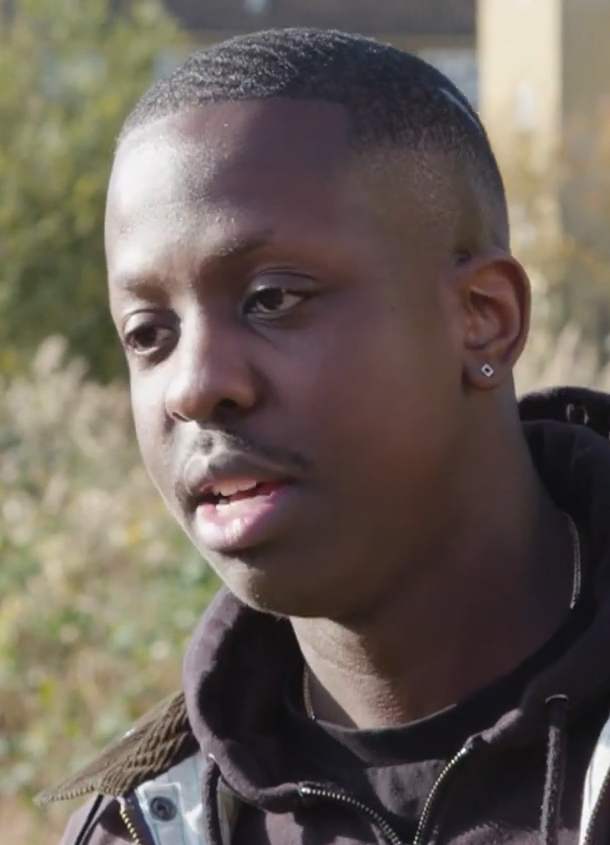
- Edwards in 2019
- Born: Jamal Brendan Edwards; 24 August 1990; Luton, Bedfordshire, England
- Died: 20 February 2022 (aged 31); Acton, London, England
- Other name: SmokeyBarz
- Occupation: Businessman
- Years active: 2006–2022
- Known for: Founder of SB.TV
- Parent: Brenda Edwards (mother)

Jamal Brendan Edwards MBE (24 August 1990 – 20 February 2022) was an English music businessman, DJ and founder of the online R&B/Hip-Hop platform SB.TV.

Edwards was an ambassador for the Prince's Trust, a youth charity which helps young people set up their own businesses. In 2021, Edwards set up Jamal Edwards Delve, a project aimed at refurbishing and reopening youth centres.

== Early life ==
Jamal Edwards was born on 24 August 1990 in Luton, England, and spent his early years there before moving to Acton, West London, where he lived with his mother Brenda Edwards, stepfather, Patrick, and his younger sister, Tanisha. Edwards' family originates from Saint Vincent and the Grenadines. As a child, he was introduced to stage school by his mother, who came fourth in the second series of The X Factor in 2005. His mother wanted him to pursue acting and drama; however, he aspired to be successful in the music industry. He attended Acton High School and enjoyed the subjects of ICT and music. However, he struggled to attain the grades he needed for college, and as a result, had to study for an extra year. He then attended Ealing Green College, part of West London College, where he received a BTEC diploma in Media Moving Image. During his school years, he started rapping and would film videos with his friends that would then be posted on YouTube. These videos would eventually become his business and the beginning of SBTV. Edwards worked for the retail chain Topman for four years to support himself financially while he ran SBTV.

== Career ==
=== SBTV ===
Edwards was the founder of SBTV, an online media platform to discover emerging artists. It launched in 2006 and has helped to launch the careers of many artists including Ed Sheeran, Jessie J, Stormzy and Emeli Sandé. When Edwards was 15, he was given a video camera, filmed friends rapping and performing and uploaded them to his YouTube channel. Then, he created the channel SBTV for his videos, taking the initials from "SmokeyBarz", the name he had briefly used as a rapper. After he left school, he worked for the clothing company Topman, while continuing to make videos. His videos became more popular with hundreds of thousands of views. He was able to leave Topman to concentrate on SBTV. Initially, the channel's content was grime dance music, but he then began to explore other musical genres.

Edwards filmed some artists before they became well-known such as Jessie J's first acoustic video (apart from videos on her personal YouTube channel). He also filmed others such as Stormzy, Ed Sheeran, Dave, Emeli Sandé, Rita Ora, Krept & Konan, Yungen, Mic Righteous, Nines, Tori Kelly, Bugzy Malone, Mist, English Frank, Aaron Unknown and Cadet.

In 2011, SBTV was featured in a Google Chrome advert. The ad caused the SBTV site to crash due to the traffic and it became the second-most popular UK YouTube video of the year. As a result, this attracted the attention of the rapper, Dr. Dre, who invited Edwards to film him on a tour of Asia.

In 2016, SBTV worked with the youth-focused news service, Press Association to expand into more of a mainstream multichannel video. Over the years Edwards constructed collaborations with some of the world's biggest stars, conducting the first online UK-based interviews with Drake, Nicki Minaj and Wiz Khalifa.

=== Fashion ===
As well as his online platform, Edwards released a headwear collection on Topman (his previous place of employment) with American Freshman. The collection featured limited editions of snapbacks and bucket hats that were designed by Edwards himself. As part of the GQ Heroes series in 2019, Edwards hosted an open forum discussion with Adwoa Aboah on mental health. In 2017 he made a documentary about male suicide. Edwards walked in the Hermès: Step into the Frame catwalk show at London's Nine Elms.

In 2019, Kurt Geiger revealed Edwards as one of the faces of its "Characterful Style" campaign for AW19. Later that year, Edwards was also announced as one of the faces of the Primark AW19 collection, celebrating 50 years of the brand.

=== Book ===
In 2013, Edwards released an ebook, Self Belief: The Vision: How To Be a Success on Your Own Terms. His book achieved success and was the number-one bestselling ebook series according to iBooks. It sold so well that Virgin Books bought the rights for a print edition.

=== Music ===
In 2019, Edwards directed the Chelsea FC remix video of grime artist Capo Lee's "Style and Swag". The video featured players including Callum Hudson-Odoi, Ruben Loftus-Cheek, Ngolo Kante, Christian Pulisic, Tammy Abraham and Michy Batshuayi.

In November 2021, Edwards launched the 8BARS app: a ground-breaking platform supporting up-and-coming music stars. The app received investments from the likes of British rapper Nines, as well as early Spotify investors. It also launched with an exclusive pilot partnership with SoundCloud.

In 2021, Edwards created the pseudonym Jamal Artman to launch his DJ career, paying homage to his birth name. Under this pseudonym, Edwards launched the house and dance music event night "Cultivation".

=== Jamal Edwards Delve (JED) ===
Securing funding from Google and the Wellcome Trust, in 2019, Edwards founded Jamal Edwards Delve (JED), a grassroots youth-centre project. As of October 2019, Edwards had refurbished and reopened four youth centres in Acton. As of December 2020, more than 150 people have engaged across the four centres.

=== Directing ===
In 2021, Edwards was signed to RadicalMedia as a director. He later produced commercial content in partnership with the likes of Subway and Depop. Edwards also teamed up with singer-songwriter Jake Bugg in 2021. Edwards directed a brand-new series to showcase the unseen side of Bugg's story, including his early years in Nottingham and the inspiration behind his music style and lyrics.

In December 2021, Edwards directed Ed Sheeran's "Bad Habits" remix, featuring Tion Wayne and Central Cee. Shortly afterwards, Edwards went on to direct Fireboy DML's "Peru" Remix with Ed Sheeran.

=== Other ===
In 2017, the National Portrait Gallery, London acquired a portrait of Edwards by photographer Simon Frederick for its permanent collection.

In 2018, Edwards was announced as the first ambassador for Mercedes-Benz X-Class, through his ambassadorship Edwards launched his own YouTube series JE:SELF-BELIEF and JE:WHAT'S YOUR DRIVE. Edwards was keen to inspire other creatives and entrepreneurs through his vlogs, exploring the challenges and dreams of a true entrepreneur of the digital native era. The vlogs presented insight into Edwards's busy life, featuring artists, broadcasters, filmmakers, social influencers and more as he travelled around London and the UK showing off his pick-up truck.

In 2020, Edwards announced a partnership with the Department for Education, a three-part campaign encouraging young creatives to consider undertaking an apprenticeship. The partnership involved the grime MC P Money.

In 2021, Jamal joined his mother, Brenda Edwards, on ITV's show Loose Women, where he shared "How He Built a Multi-million Pound Business & How His Mum Brenda Inspired Him". Edwards was also named as an ambassador for Google Pixel.

== Business career, philanthropic and mentor work ==
In 2014, Edwards helped launch the Queen's Young Leaders Programme with an image of Edwards, Prince William and Prince Harry captured by a Twitter mirror.

Edwards also worked to raise awareness surrounding mental health. In March 2017, he made a documentary with The Guardian about male suicide, in which he spoke to his childhood friends who suffer with mental health problems. Later that year, Edwards continued his work and explored mental health in the music industry.

He was open about his own struggles, stating in an interview with Music Week: "Anxiety comes over me at the most random times. I wanted to create awareness. As much as music is my entry point, I feel a responsibility to talk about these other issues. I wanted to get people talking to each other and they have been, I'm happy."

As well as his documentary work, Edwards collaborated with the mental health charity CALM, and wrote a column that discussed the issue for the online site The Book of Man.

== Death ==
Edwards died at his mother's home in Acton, London, on 20 February 2022, at the age of 31. The cause of death was cardiac arrhythmia caused by cocaine toxicity.

The day before his death, Edwards had been DJing at a gig in North London. Celebrities and other figures gave out their statements responding to his death after it was announced. Lady Leshurr, who also worked with Edwards on SBTV, said the news was "heartbreaking" and that Edwards "gave opportunity after opportunity to showcase talent from Brum into London. We need to keep his name and brand alive." King Charles III, then Prince of Wales, founder of The Prince's Trust of which Edwards was an ambassador, wrote that "His work in music but also as an ambassador for a new generation, including his work for The Prince's Trust, were an inspiration to so many". An inquest in August 2022 found the cause of Edwards' death to be "cardiac arrhythmia, following cocaine use."

Edwards' family discovered four months after his death that he had left a letter of wishes alongside his will and testament, reaffirming his hopes that others continue the work of his initiative JE Delve in addressing youth unemployment and providing creative spaces for young people. His mother and sister subsequently established the Jamal Edwards Self Belief Trust. On 19 January 2023, long-time friend Ed Sheeran released the single "F64," a tribute to Edwards.

== Honours and awards ==
- Edwards was awarded an MBE in the 2015 New Year Honours from Elizabeth II, for services to music through his business, SBTV.
- Edwards featured in the ES Power 1,000 – London's most influential people 2013: Deal makers, Tycoons.
- In 2014, Edwards was listed at number 2 in The Guardian's "The top 30 young people in digital media".
- On 12 September 2014, TIME magazine named Edwards as one of their "Next Generation Leaders"
- In 2015, Edwards was awarded the Best New StartUp from Virgin Media and Virgin StartUp.
- Also in 2015, Edwards was named in Debrett's list of the 500 most influential people in Britain in the New Media section alongside YouTube vloggers Zoella and Alfie Deyes.
- In May 2016, the British Interactive Media Association (BIMA) inducted Edwards into its Hall of Fame. Edwards was recognised for his contributions to the online music industry for creating the SB.TV music platform.
- Also in 2016, Edwards was named in GQ magazine's 100 Most Connected Men in 2016.
- Edwards was named as one of the Maserati 100 in 2016, a partnership with The Sunday Times to recognise one hundred successful entrepreneurs who are innovators in the business world.
- Edwards was chosen to be the ambassador for the youth charity The Prince's Trust in 2013. The charity is run by Prince Charles to help young people to set up their own businesses.
- Edwards received an honorary MBA from Luton & Bedfordshire University.
- Edwards was appointed Entrepreneur in Residence at the University of Sussex in September 2021
- Edwards received an honorary Doctor of Letters degree for his success, from the University of West London in November 2021.
