= Peter Katis =

American record producer and musician (born 1966)

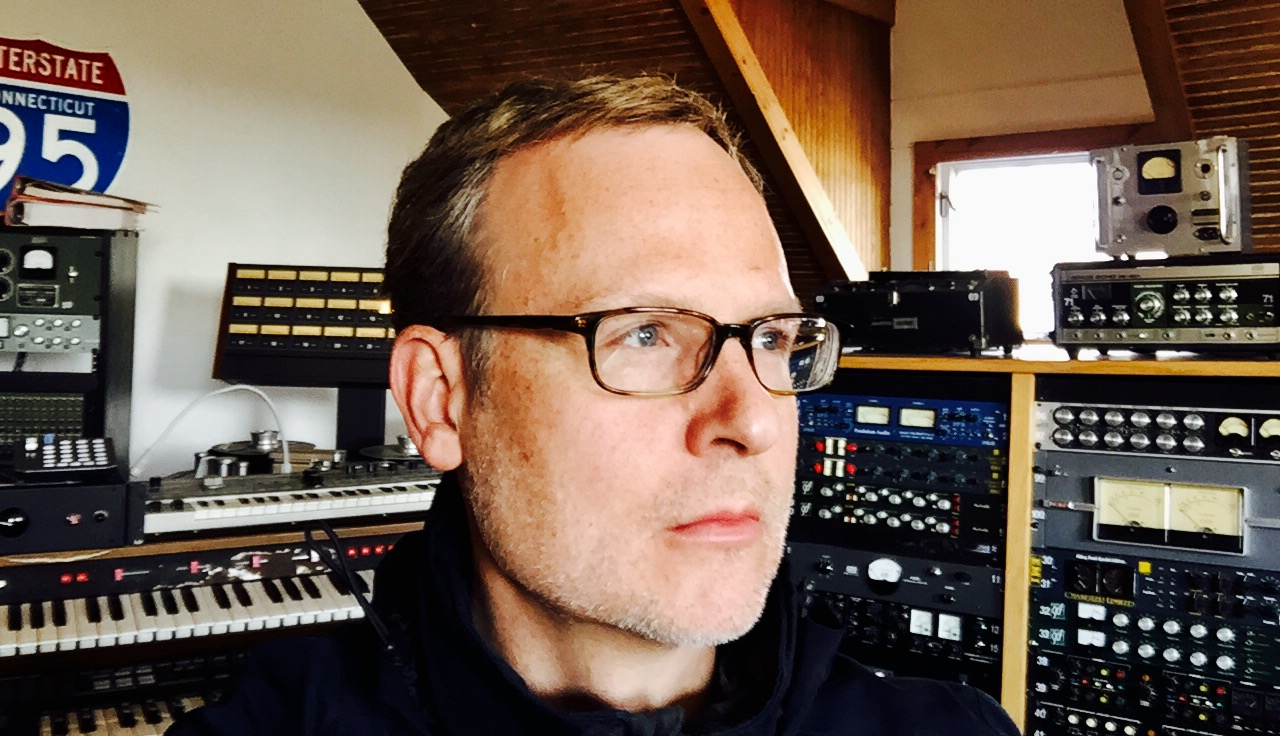
- Katis in 2016

Background information
- Born: April 1966 (age 60); New York City, US
- Genres: Alternative rock; indie rock
- Occupations: Record producer; audio engineer; musician
- Years active: 1990–present
- Website: Tarquin Studios

Peter Katis (born April 1966) is an American record producer, audio engineer, and musician.

He is known for his long-standing collaborations with The National, Interpol, Frightened Rabbit, Jónsi of Sigur Rós, Guster, Trey Anastasio, Tokyo Police Club, We Were Promised Jetpacks, and The Head and the Heart. In addition, he has also worked with Hozier, Moby, Death Cab for Cutie, Gang of Youths, Kurt Vile, Stars, Middle Kids, The Paper Kites, and PUP. He works primarily out of his residential studio, Tarquin Studios, in Bridgeport, Connecticut. He has won a Grammy Award for Best Alternative Music Album for his work on The National's album Sleep Well Beast (2017).

== Personal life ==
Katis was born in New York City in April 1966 to Dr. Lauma Katis and Dr. James Katis, both psychiatrists in Greenwich, Connecticut. His brothers are Tom Katis and Tarquin Katis. He grew up in Connecticut and attended New Canaan Country School and Greenwich High School. He earned a degree in English and visual arts from the University of Vermont. Katis lives with his family in Fairfield, Connecticut.

== Career ==
Peter Katis' music career began in the late 1980s with The Philistines Jr., an experimental pop band composed of Katis (vocals, guitar, keyboards), his brother Tarquin Katis (vocals, bass), and their friend Adam Pierce (drums). The band's first gig was an opening spot for Phish in front of a sparse crowd on the campus of the University of Vermont.

The Philistines Jr.'s early albums—Greenwich, CT (1991) and The Continuing Struggle of The Philistines Jr. (1993)—received critical acclaim and charted on college radio stations across North America. The band also received frequent airplay from John Peel on his BBC Radio 1 program. Upon hearing their first album, Peel telephoned the band “just to say how much he liked the record,” and invited them to record a Peel Session in London. They went on to record two more and toured the UK concurrently.

While continuing to write and perform with The Philistines Jr., Katis developed a reputation as a recording engineer and mixer, initially working on projects for friends and fellow independent musicians. His technical skills and production style gradually led to collaborations with a wider circle of artists, establishing him as a sought-after producer in the indie and alternative rock scenes.

In 1998, Katis opened Tarquin Studios—a dedicated production space—in a 7,000-square-foot Victorian home in Bridgeport, Connecticut. Working as a producer/audio engineer/mixer, some of his most notable collaborations are with The National, Interpol and Frightened Rabbit.

=== The National ===
Katis has worked with The National as a co-producer on ten of their studio albums/EPs: Sad Songs for Dirty Lovers (2003), Cherry Tree (2004), Alligator (2005), Boxer (2007), High Violet (2010), Trouble Will Find Me (2013), Sleep Well Beast (2017), I Am Easy to Find (2019), First Two Pages of Frankenstein (2023), and Laugh Track (2023). Trouble Will Find Me received a Grammy Award nomination for Best Alternative Music Album, while Sleep Well Beast won the Grammy Award for Best Alternative Music Album.

=== Interpol ===
Katis produced and mixed Interpol’s debut album Turn On the Bright Lights (2002), which became a landmark release in the post-punk revival movement, as well as their follow-up Antics (2004). Both albums were critically acclaimed and played a key role in establishing the band’s international success. Katis subsequently worked with its lead singer Paul Banks on Julian Plenti Is... Skyscraper (2009) and Banks (2012).

=== Frightened Rabbit ===
Katis produced The Midnight Organ Fight (2008) and The Winter of Mixed Drinks (2010) for the Scottish band. The 10th-anniversary tribute album, Tiny Changes: A Celebration of Frightened Rabbit's The Midnight Organ Fight (2019) included a cover of "Bright Pink Bookmark" by The Philistines Jr. The release served not only as a celebration of the band's work but also as a tribute to Scott Hutchison's legacy. In addition, a portion of the proceeds from the album went to support Tiny Changes, a mental health charity established by Hutchison's family in his memory.

== Discography ==
Year	Title	Artist	Credits
1991	Greenwich, CT	The Philistines Jr.	Lyrics, Performer, Producer, Engineer, Mixing
1993	The Continuing Struggle of The Philistines Jr.	The Philistines Jr.	Lyrics, Performer, Producer, Engineer, Mixing
1994	When the Doves Cry: The Music of Prince	Bob Belden	Assistant Engineer
1995	Thumper		Engineer, Audio Engineer
1995	The True Story	James Kochalka Superstar	Producer, Engineer
1995	The Sinking of the S.S. Danehower	The Philistines Jr.	Lyrics, Performer, Producer, Engineer, Mixing
1995	Bingham's Hole	The Mommyheads	Producer
1995	1st Bubble Core Records Sampler		Engineer
1996	Resonance Found at the Core of a Bubble		Engineer
1996	Happiest Guys in the World	Happiest Guys in the World	Engineer, Mixing
1996	After School Special		Engineer
1996	100% Hockey...and Other Stuff	The Zambonis	Engineer, Illustrations, Artwork
1997	Show & Tell: A Stormy Remembrance of TV Themes		Engineer
1997	Pop Pie		Producer, Engineer
1997	Play-Off Fever!	The Zambonis	Engineer
1997	Monkey vs. Robot	James Kochalka Superstar	Producer, Engineer, Various Instruments, Vocals (Background), Layout Design
1997	Half Empty	Michael Shelley	Producer, Engineer, Mixing
1997	Dylan Group & H.I.M.	The Dylan Group	Engineer
1997	Cradle the Balls	Satanicide	
1998	Welcome to the Jungle	Jim Rome	Composer
1998	Too Many Movies	Michael Shelley	Engineer
1998	The True Meaning of Boodleybaye	Mice Parade	Engineer
1998	Survival of the Illest: Live from 125 NYC		Digital Editing
1998	Heartdrops	The Heartdrops	Engineer
1998	Dreams Gone Sour	The Absolute Zeros	Producer, Recorder
1998	Deserter's Songs	Mercury Rev	Engineer
1998	After the Morning	Katie McMahon	Engineer
1999	Ramda	Mice Parade	Engineer
1999	More Adventures in Lying Down	The Dylan Group	Engineer
1999	Enemy Hogs	Oneida	Engineer, Mixing
2000	Ur-Klang Search	The Dylan Group	Engineer
2000	Steel Rod	Oneida	Mixing
2000	Put-Outs Sing the Hits	Put-Outs	Mixing
2000	Now Is the Time: Live at the Knitting Factory	Alex Blake	Engineer, Pre-Mastering Engineer
2000	Kiss Without Makeup	Franklin Bruno	Engineer, Mixing
2000	Eat Crow	Pants	Producer, Engineer, Mastering, Various Instruments, Layout Design
2000	Come on Everybody Let's Rock	Oneida	Mixing
2001	The Operating Theater	Brian Dewan	Engineer, Mixing
2001	The Ghost of Fashion	Clem Snide	Mixing
2001	Mokoondi	Mice Parade	Engineer, Mixing, Overdub Engineer
2001	I Blame You	Michael Shelley	Mixing, Recorder
2001	Elza	Elza	Producer, Engineer, Mixing, Instrumentation
2001	Don't Trust Whitey	James Kochalka Superstar	Producer, Mixing, Mastering, Recording
2001	Anthem of the Moon	Oneida	Engineer, Mixing
2001	Analog vs. Digital	The Philistines Jr.	Producer, Vocals, Guitar, Keyboards, Artwork, Composer
2001	All Is Dream	Mercury Rev	Engineer
2002	Turn on the Bright Lights	Interpol	Engineer, Mixing
2002	Pushbutton Parfait	Raymond Scott Orchestrette	Engineer, Mastering
2002	On a Wire	The Get Up Kids	Engineer, Mixing
2002	MTV Road Rules: Don't Make Me Pull This Thing Over, Vol. 1		Mixing
2002	Interpol	Interpol	Engineer, Mixing
2002	For the Kids [Nettwerk compilation]		Producer, Engineer, Vocals (Background), Instrumentation
2002	Each One Teach One	Oneida	Engineer, Mixing
2002	Atheists, Reconsider	Liars / Oneida	Engineer
2002	All Roads Lead to Salzburg	Mice Parade	Engineer, Mixing, Overdubs
2003	Yes New York		Engineer
2003	Wild Card	Jim Allen	Engineer
2003	The Instinct	Denali	Producer, Engineer, Mixing, Mastering
2003	Stars at Noon	Sea Ray	Engineer, Mixing
2003	Sad Songs for Dirty Lovers	The National	Producer, Engineer, Mixing
2003	Maybe This Christmas Too?		Producer, Engineer, Mixing
2003	Keep It Together	Guster	Recording
2003	Heather	Satanicide	Engineer, Audio Engineer
2003	A Winter's Night: The Best of Nettwerk Christmas Albums		Producer, Engineer, Mixing
2004	The O.C. Mix 2		Engineer
2004	My Body: The Pistol	Les Baton Rouge	Producer, Engineer
2004	Matador at Fifteen		Engineer
2004	Mamacita, Donde Esta Santa Claus?	Guster	Mixing, Producer, Recording
2004	Lightning and the Sun	Katy Mae	Engineer, Keyboards
2004	Life of the Party	Longwave	Mixing
2004	Fine Lines	Robbers on High Street	Engineer
2004	Cherry Tree	The National	Engineer
2004	Antics	Interpol	Engineer, Audio Engineer, Mixing
2004	Aghast Agape	The Prosaics	Producer, Engineer, Audio Engineer, Audio Production
2005	Trilateral Commission	Jimi Tunnell	Assistant Engineer
2005	Tree City	Robbers on High Street	Producer, Engineer, Mixing
2005	The Loyal	Tiger Lou	Mixing
2005	The Loving Sounds of Static	Mobius Band	Producer, Mixing
2005	The Golden Republic	The Golden Republic	Producer, Engineer, Audio Engineer, Audio Production
2005	Our Most Beloved	James Kochalka Superstar	Producer, Main Personnel
2005	Nights Wave	Mice Parade	Mixing, Overdubs
2005	Hanukkah Rocks	The LeeVees	Producer, Engineer, Mixing, Guitar, Instrumentation
2005	DoublePlays: All Is Dream/Deserter's Songs	Mercury Rev	Engineer
2005	City vs. Country	Mobius Band	Engineer, Mixing, Audio Production
2005	Bem-Vinda Vontade	Mice Parade	Engineer, Audio Engineer, Mixing, Overdubs
2005	Alligator	The National	Producer, Engineer, Audio Engineer, Mixing, Audio Production, Vocals
2006	Tremors	Humanzi	Producer, Mixing
2006	Spread Your Evil Wings and Fly	James Kochalka Superstar	Composer
2006	Peoples	HiM	Engineer
2006	How Do You Spell Channukkahh?	The Leevees	Fender Rhodes, Guitar, Mixing, Producer, Recording, Vocals (Background)
2006	Hockey Monkey	James Kochalka Superstar	Composer, Producer
2006	Gravity Won't Get You High	The Grates	Mixing
2006	Diet Pills & Magazines	Humanzi	Mixing
2006	Catastrophe Keeps Us Together	Rainer Maria	Producer, Engineer, Mixing
2006	19-20-20	The Grates	Mixing
2007	One Man Wrecking Machine	Guster	Recording
2007	Mice Parade	Mice Parade	Assistant Engineer
2007	Marginalia	Nurse & Soldier	Producer, Engineer, Mixing
2007	I'll Follow You	Oakley Hall	Engineer, Mixing
2007	Fourteen Autumns & Fifteen Winters	The Twilight Sad	Mixing
2007	Boxer	The National	Producer, Engineer, Mixing
2007	Anjula	Anjula Prasad	Mixing
2008	Up with the Sun	Titles	ARP Synthesizer
2008	The Midnight Organ Fight	Frightened Rabbit	Producer, Engineer, Mixing
2008	Teeth Lost, Hearts Won	The Grates	Producer, Engineer, Mixing, Guitar, Keyboards
2008	Summer Palace	Sunny Day Sets Fire	Producer, Mixing
2008	Secrets Are Sinister	Longwave	Producer, Engineer, Audio Engineer, Mixing
2008	Re-Arrange Us	Mates of State	Producer, Engineer, Mixing, Guitar, Vocals (Background), Bass
2008	Heavenly Bender	Sam Champion	Mixing
2008	Fight on the Ice	The Zambonis	Composer
2008	Elephant Shell	Tokyo Police Club	Producer, Mixing
2008	DeLeon	DeLeon	Engineer
2008	5 Zusammen Verschwinden	Karpatenhund	Mixing
2009	Up End Atom: A Tribute to Atom & His Package		Producer, Engineer
2009	These Four Walls	We Were Promised Jetpacks	Producer, Various Instruments, Engineer, Mixing, Instrumentation
2009	Strict Joy	The Swell Season	Producer, ARP Synthesizer, Percussion, Performer, Featured Artist
2009	Silver Starling	Silver Starling	Mixing
2009	Reservoir	Fanfarlo	Producer, Engineer, Mixing, Instrumentation
2009	Love, Hate and Then There's You	The Von Bondies	Engineer, Audio Engineer
2009	Julian Plenti Is... Skyscraper	Paul Banks	Producer, Engineer, Mixing, Additional Music
2009	Dark Was the Night		Engineer, Mixing
2009	Ciao My Shining Star: The Songs of Mark Mulcahy	Mark Mulcahy	Producer
2010	What It Means to Be Left-Handed	Mice Parade	Engineer, Mixing
2010	The Winter of Mixed Drinks	Frightened Rabbit	Additional Production, Engineer, Mixing, Instrumentation
2010	Sleep Mountain	The Kissaway Trail	Producer, Mixing
2010	Let's Go Coconuts!	The Macaroons	Engineer
2010	If a Band Plays in the Woods...?	The Philistines Jr.	Producer, Engineer, Mixing, Vocals, Artwork, Instrumentation
2010	How to Train Your Dragon: Music from the Motion Picture	John Powell	Drum Engineering, Percussion Engineer
2010	High Violet	The National	Producer, Engineer, Mixing
2010	Going the Distance		Producer
2010	Go	Jónsi	Producer, Engineer
2010	Everything Under the Sun	Jukebox the Ghost	Producer, Engineer, Mixing
2010	Easy Wonderful	Guster	Engineer, Mixing
2011	We Bought a Zoo [Original Soundtrack]	Jónsi	Producer
2011	Prisoner	The Jezabels	Mixing
2011	Outside	Tapes 'n Tapes	Additional Production, Engineer, Mixing
2011	Mountaintops	Mates of State	Engineer
2011	In the Pit of the Stomach	We Were Promised Jetpacks	Additional Production, Mixing
2011	Fire Needs Air	Dazzled Kid	Mixing
2011	Deserter's Songs: Instrumental	Mercury Rev	Engineer, Mixing
2012	Traveler	Trey Anastasio	Producer, Engineer, Mixing, Vocals, String Arrangements, Instrumentation
2012	Tramp	Sharon Van Etten	Engineer, Mixing
2012	Shallow Bed	Dry the River	Producer, Engineer, Mixing
2012	Live: England vs. France	Mice Parade	Mixing
2012	Julian Plenti Lives	Paul Banks	Producer, Mixing, Instrumentation
2012	Five Minute Major (In D Minor)	The Zambonis	Engineer, Mixing
2012	Epic Stadium Anthems		Engineer, Mixing Engineer, Producer
2012	Circles Around the Sun	Dispatch	Producer, Engineer
2012	Banks	Paul Banks	Producer, Engineer, Mixing, Instrumentation
2012	Animal Joy	Shearwater	Guest Artist, Producer, Engineer, Mixing
2013	Trouble Will Find Me	The National	Mixing
2013	The Hunger Games: Catching Fire – Original Motion Picture Soundtrack		Mixing
2013	Let's Be Still	The Head and the Heart	Additional Production, Engineer, Mixing, Instrumentation
2013	Hummingbird	Local Natives	Mixing
2013	Chop Chop	Bell X1	Producer, Engineer, Mixing
2013	Breach	The Kissaway Trail	Producer, Engineer, Mixing, Guitar, Synthesizer
2014	Youth Culture Forever	PAWS	Mixing
2014	Ruckers Hill	Husky	Mixing
2014	Nobody Wants to Be Here and Nobody Wants to Leave	The Twilight Sad	Additional Production, Mixing
2014	Honeyblood	Honeyblood	Producer, Engineer, Mixing, Electronic Percussion
2014	Augustines	Augustines	Producer, Engineer, Mixing, Instrumentation
2015	You're Going to Make It	Mates of State	Mixing
2015	Then Came the Morning	The Lone Bellow	Mixing
2015	The Positions	Gang of Youths	Mixing
2015	Jackrabbit	San Fermin	Producer, Engineer, Mixing
2015	B'lieve I'm Goin Down...	Kurt Vile	Mixing
2015	After It All	Delta Rae	Producer, Engineer, Mixing, Instrumentation
2016	This Is Your Life	Augustines	Producer, Mixing
2016	Synthia	The Jezabels	Mixing
2016	Omega/Whatever	Avers	Mixing
2016	It's Not About the Witches	T.O.L.D.	Mixing
2016	Everything and Nothing	Hammock	Mixing
2016	Arms	Bell X1	Mixing
2016	And Then Like Lions	Blind Pilot	Mixing
2016	Wild Rivers	Wild Rivers	
2017	There Is No Love in Fluorescent Light	Stars	Producer, Engineer, Mixing, Instrumentation
2017	The World We Built	The Wild Reeds	Producer, Engineer, Mixing
2017	So Numb	Sannhet	Producer, Engineer, Mixing
2017	Sleep Well Beast	The National	Producer, Mixing
2017	Only the Lonely	Colony House	Additional Production, Engineer, Mixing
2017	Near to the Wild Heart of Life	Japandroids	Additional Production, Mixing
2017	Mystified	Scarborough	Producer
2017	Mysterium	Hammock	Mixing
2017	Go Farther in Lightness	Gang of Youths	Mixing
2018	On the Corner Where You Live	The Paper Kites	Producer, Engineer, Mixing
2018	Lost Friends	Middle Kids	Mixing
2018	Bottle It In	Kurt Vile	Additional Production, Engineer, Mixing
2018	Before the Sun Goes Down	The New Respects	Mixing
2019	Tiny Changes: A Celebration of Frightened Rabbit's The Midnight Organ Fight		Engineer, Guitar, Keyboards, Mixing, Producer, Recording
2019	The Blue EP	Death Cab for Cutie	Engineer, Mixing, Producer
2019	Ruthless	The Moth & the Flame	Producer, Performer, Engineer, Mixing
2019	Problems	The Get Up Kids	Producer, Engineer, Mixing
2019	Natural, Everyday Degradation	Remo Drive	Engineer, Mixing
2019	Help!	The Philistines Jr.	Lyrics, Performer, Producer, Engineer, Mixing
2019	I Am Easy to Find	The National	Mixing
2019	Bobbie Gentry's The Delta Sweete Revisited	Mercury Rev	Mixing
2020	Before Everything Got Real	LULLANAS	Producer
2020	The Cormorant I & II	San Fermin	Mixing
2020	Fish Pond Fish	Darlingside	Producer, Engineer, Mixing, Keyboards
2020	Half Moon Light	The Lone Bellow	Mixing
2020	Highway Honey	LULLANAS	Producer
2020	Local Honey	Brian Fallon	Producer, Engineer, Mixing, Keyboards, Programming
2020	Memphis	LULLANAS	Producer
2021	Weatherman	Wild Rivers	Producer
2022	The Unraveling of PUPTheBand	PUP	Producer, Engineer, Mixing, Keyboards
2022	Angel in Realtime	Gang of Youths	Producer, Mixing
2022	Sidelines	Wild Rivers	Producer, Engineer, Mixing, Instrumentation, Additional Production, Keyboards, Programming
2023	Eat Your Young	Hozier	Mixing
2023	First Two Pages of Frankenstein	The National	Engineer
2023	History Books	The Gaslight Anthem	Producer, Engineer, Mixing, Keyboards
2023	Laugh Track	The National	Engineer, Additional Production
2023	Resound NYC	Moby	Mixing
2023	The Big Mess	Tanlines	Mixing, Keyboards, Additional Production
2023	Unreal Unearth	Hozier	Mixing, Engineer
2024	Born Horses	Mercury Rev	Mixing
2024	Plastic: The Album	Cindertalk / Scott Guild / Stranger Cat	Co-Producer, Mixing Engineer
2024	Rome	The National	Mixing
2024	Thoughts and Observations	The Coronas	Mixing
2024	Softly Softly	Tall Heights	Mixing
2025	Dark Dark Bright	Nick and June	Producer, Mixing
2025	Every Time I Feel Afraid	Carriers	Mixing
2025	When Youth Fades Away	Somebody's Child	
2025	Ghost Walker	James Kochalka Superstar	
2025	Empty Words	Radio Free Alice	Producer, Recording, Mixing
