= The Philistines Jr. =

The Philistines Jr. is an American rock band from Connecticut. Active since 1990, the group has released four studio albums, the most recent being 2019's Help!.

== History ==
The Philistines Jr. was founded by brothers Peter Katis and Tarquin Katis, alongside friend Adam Pierce. In addition to guitar, bass, and drums, their early records made use of keyboard instruments such as electric organ and toy piano.

After their second full-length, Analog vs. Digital, was released in 2001, they issued no new material until 2010, when If a Band Plays in the Woods...? was released. This was released with a companion album, If a Lot of Bands Play in the Woods...?, of other bands covering and remixing tracks from If a Band Plays in the Woods...?. Artists on the companion album included The National, Mice Parade, Tokyo Police Club, Tapes 'N Tapes, Jonsi, Mercury Rev, Oneida, We Were Promised Jetpacks, and Frightened Rabbit.

The band was then quiet again for several years, but in 2017, they released a cover of the song "NYC" by Interpol. The Philistines Jr. toured with Gang of Youths in 2018. After the suicide of Frightened Rabbit singer Scott Hutchison, The Philistines Jr. contributed a cover of "Bright Pink Bookmark" to Tiny Changes, a tribute album of covers of songs from Frightened Rabbit's The Midnight Organ Fight - which Peter Katis had produced. Later in 2019, the group released its fourth full-length, Help!, which Paste described as "an attempt to make sense of the world at an unsettled time."

In addition to the Philistines Jr., the group members also play in bands called Iris and The Zambonis. Peter Katis works as a producer, Tarquin Katis runs Tarquin Records, the band's own label, and Adam Pierce records under the pseudonym Mice Parade.

== Members ==
- Peter Katis (vocals, guitar, keyboards)
- Tarquin Katis (bass)
- Adam Pierce (drums)

== Discography ==
Albums

- The Sinking of the S.S. Danehower (Dot Dot Dash, 1995)
- Analog Vs. Digital (Or We Don't Get The Respect We Deserve In Today's Scientific Community) (Tarquin Records, 2001)
- If a Band Plays in the Woods...? (Tarquin Records, 2010)
- Help! (Tarquin Records, 2019)

EPs

- Greenwich, CT (Dot Dot Dash, 1991)
- The Continuing Struggle of the Philistines Jr. (Tarquin Records, 1993)
