= Augustines (album) =

Studio album by Augustines
- Released: February 3, 2014
- Recorded: Tarquin Studios
- Genre: Indie rock
- Length: 44:50
- Label: Votiv, Caroline International
- Producer: Peter Katis

Augustines chronology
Rise Ye Sunken Ships (2011)	Augustines (2014)

Professional ratings
Aggregate scores
Source	Rating
Metacritic	72/100
Review scores
Source	Rating
AbsolutePunk	90%
Drowned in Sound	9/10
musicOMH	4.5/5 stars
This Is Fake DIY	3/5 stars

Augustines is the second studio album by the American indie rock band Augustines, released on February 3, 2014. The album received generally favourable reviews. "Walkabout" was featured in the trailer for the movie The Judge.

== Track listing ==
All tracks are written by Augustines.

No.	Title	Length
1.	"Intro (I Touch Imaginary Hands)"	1:37
2.	"Cruel City"	3:44
3.	"Nothing to Lose But Your Head"	3:53
4.	"Weary Eyes"	4:09
5.	"Don't You Look Back"	4:25
6.	"Walkabout"	5:01
7.	"Kid You're on Your Own"	4:00
8.	"This Ain't Me"	4:37
9.	"Now You Are Free"	4:09
10.	"The Avenue"	3:32
11.	"Highway 1 Interlude"	2:13
12.	"Hold Onto Anything"	3:35

== Personnel ==
- William McCarthy - vocals, guitar
- Eric Sanderson - bass, engineer, mixing
- Rob Allen - drums
- Augustines - producers, string arrangements, horn arrangements
- Peter Katis - engineer, instrumentation, mixing, producer
- John Panos - flugelhorn, Trumpet
- Kit Karlson - engineer, piano, tuba
- Al Hardamon - horn Arrangements, trombone
- Rob Moose - string Arrangements, viola, violin
- Jason Hammel - vocals
- Kori Gardner - vocals
- Mates of State - vocals
- Andrew Joslyn - violin
- Mike Brown - hammond B3
- Greg Calbi - mastering
- Greg Giorgio - engineer, mixing
- David Groener - engineer
- Chris Montgomery - engineer
- Scott Reed - engineer
- Marlowe Stern - engineer
- Chris Becker - cover photo
- Glen "Ninja" Alberastine - artwork, design
- Luke Gabrieli - artwork
