= A Portrait of an Ugly Man =

Studio album by Remo Drive
- Released: June 26, 2020
- Recorded: 2019–2020
- Genre: Alternative rock; indie rock
- Length: 40:05
- Label: Epitaph
- Producer: Erik Paulson

Remo Drive chronology
| Natural, Everyday Extended Play (2019) | A Portrait of an Ugly Man (2020) | Mercy (2024) |

Singles from A Portrait of an Ugly Man
- 1. "Star Worship" Released: April 28, 2020; 2. "Ode to Joy 2" Released: May 18, 2020; 3. "A Flower and a Weed" Released: June 17, 2020

A Portrait of an Ugly Man is the third studio album by Remo Drive, released on June 26, 2020, on Epitaph Records.

== Background ==
A Portrait of an Ugly Man was recorded from 2019 to 2020, shortly after the release of their second studio album, Natural, Everyday Degradation. On April 28, 2020, Remo Drive released the first single from the album; "Star Worship". They announced the album and launched preorders for it the same day. On May 18, the second single from the album, "Ode to Joy 2", was released. On June 17, "A Flower and a Weed" was released as the third single from the album.

== Critical reception ==
Professional ratings
Aggregate scores
| Source | Rating |
|---|---|
| Metacritic | 64/100 |
Review scores
| Source | Rating |
| AllMusic | 3/5 stars |
| Clash | 7/10 |
| The Line of Best Fit | 7.5/10 |
| Pitchfork | 5.4/10 |

A Portrait of an Ugly Man was met with generally favorable reviews from critics. At Metacritic, which assigns a weighted average rating out of 100 to reviews from mainstream publications, this release received an average score of 64, based on 6 reviews.

== Track listing ==
Track listing adapted from Apple Music.

All tracks are written by Erik and Stephen Paulson.

| No. | Title | Length |
|---|---|---|
| 1. | "A Guide to Live By" | 3:54 |
| 2. | "Star Worship" | 2:50 |
| 3. | "Dead Man" | 4:28 |
| 4. | "If I've Ever Looked Too Deep in Thought" | 3:28 |
| 5. | "The Ugly Man Sings" | 4:26 |
| 6. | "True Romance Lives" | 4:18 |
| 7. | "Ode to Joy 2" | 3:46 |
| 8. | "The Night I Kidnapped Remo Drive" | 5:18 |
| 9. | "A Flower and a Weed" | 3:22 |
| 10. | "Easy as That" | 4:15 |
| Total length: | | 40:05 |

== Personnel ==
- Erik Paulson – lead vocals, guitar, keyboards, aux percussion, production
- Stephen Paulson – bass guitar, programming
- Sam Becht – drums
