= Walk It Off =

Studio album by Tapes 'n Tapes
- Released: April 2, 2008
- Recorded: Tarbox Road Studios in New York
- Genre: Indie rock
- Length: 44:06
- Label: XL Recordings
- Producer: Dave Fridmann

Tapes 'n Tapes chronology
The Loon (2005)	Walk It Off (2008)	Outside (2011)

Walk It Off is the second album from the Minneapolis-based band Tapes 'n Tapes, released on 2 April 2008.

While their previous album, The Loon, was produced by the band's bassist and producer, Eric Applewick, and was recorded in a friend's unfinished basement studio, Walk It Off was recorded by a producer, David Fridmann, at Tarbox Road Studio in Cassadaga, New York. The album has 12 tracks, although it was originally planned to have fifteen. The first single released for the album was "Hang Them All".

The critical reception to the album was generally favourable, scoring a rating of 61% from Metacritic.

== History ==
In March 2007, Josh Grier announced that a variety of new untitled songs had been written after an extensive bout of touring that began in January 2007. In an interview with Billboard, Grier said the band would wait until their April tour before playing any new material to make sure the lyrics were written, so the songs wouldn't sound like "[mumbled] words." The band announced on October 25, 2007, that recording for Walk It Off was finished. Grier commented that the band tried to make sure each song had its own personality and sound. He explained that there would be material on Walk It Off that would differ from songs the band played previously, because the band intentionally experimented with new sounds.

== Recording ==
Josh Grier stated that "having a budget was awesome" as it allowed them to have a studio where the band could get the sounds they wanted, including real drum sounds, as last time they had recorded the drums "in a place that had six-feet ceilings". Grier said that the band wanted to make a rock record without any over-indulgences, and focused on creating music where the songs sounded like the band playing songs instead of a "crazy orchestration". He also said that he wanted the music to sound the same when performed in front of a live audience.

Grier stated that some of writing for the album took place on the two months before the band recorded in the studio. The recording process was said to entail Grier writing the song, adding "all the music" and then the band would meet up and practice together to "figure out everybody's part". Grier said the last part of the process would be to add the vocals of which he would "make words kind of to match the sounds" and finally make additions and amendments to the vocals or writing whilst the band were in the studio.

Grier said of the recording process that it was "cool" to be able to live at the studio as it enabled him to "work on stuff all day and mess around with it and work on stuff all night if [he] wanted to." However, by the end of the first couple of weeks, Grier said he was "definitely ready to be done in the studio for a little bit."

== Lyrics ==
The album's lyrics were said to be different from previous songs, as the band wanted to "try some different things out" and "not do the same thing all over again." Grier voiced that the songs were written to have ambiguous meanings and were written with the intent of letting the listener interpret the meanings themselves. In addition, Grier said that there were some songs that he "spent a little bit more time on" and that he was "definitely happy with how everything turned out."

== Album title ==
Grier said the title of the album was suggested by drummer, Jeremy Hanson, who liked the idea of Walk It Off.

We were like 'oh, that sounds cool.' At that point we had thrown around a lot of stuff and nothing had really passed it, so it was like 'all right, let's go with that.' It could be so many different things, and taken so many different ways, and then we realized like three weeks later that there's a lyric in the second-to-last song, "Lines", where we actually say "walk it off." And then we were like 'oh, it's perfect!'

== Critical reception ==
Professional ratings
Review scores
Source	Rating
AbsolutePunk.net	(61%)
AllMusic	3/5 stars
Blender	2.5/5 stars
Billboard	(neutral)
BBC	(negative)
Drowned in Sound	(6/10)
The Guardian	3/5 stars
Pitchfork	(5.9/10)
PopMatters	(6/10)
Rolling Stone	3/5 stars

The critical reception to the album was generally mixed. Based on 21 reviews, review aggregate website Metacritic reported a rating of 61%.

Heather Phares of Allmusic discussed the pairing of Dave Fridmann with Tapes 'n Tapes, and said that, "while teaming a quintessential indie rock producer like him with a band of indie rock classicists like Tapes 'n Tapes might seem like a good idea on paper, it doesn't quite work".

Many reviewers compared Walk It Off to the band's debut album, The Loon, as with Jessica Braham of the BBC, who said that Walk It Off was a poor follow-up, and said it was difficult to believe that Walk It Off was by the same band who released the "innovative, abstract, and gritty debut album, The Loon". Phares said, "Nothing makes as much of a visceral impact here as songs like "Insistor" did on The Loon [...] often, it feels like there's fog or a glass wall between the music and listeners' ears".

However other reviewers felt that the album followed in a similar vein to their debut, with Billboard stating that, "[The Loon] was characterized by fuzzy vintage cool, and it's followed here with a much more frustrated version of the same", whilst others said that Walk It Off was different from their debut but that the change in sound was positive; "It doesn't match its predecessor but it's a banquet of sound well worth feasting on."

== Track listing ==
All songs written by Josh Grier.

1. "Le Ruse" – 2:56
2. "Time of Songs" – 3:42
3. "Hang Them All" – 3:00
4. "Headshock" – 2:48
5. "Conquest" – 4:14
6. "Say Back Something" – 3:12
7. "Demon Apple" – 4:30
8. "Blunt" – 3:10
9. "George Michael" – 4:02
10. "Anvil" – 3:34
11. "Lines" – 4:03
12. "The Dirty Dirty" – 5:02

== iTunes bonus track ==
1. "Wired" – 4:58

== Band members ==
- Josh Grier – guitar, vocals
- Jeremy Hanson – drums
- Matt Kretzman – keyboards, multi-instruments
- Erik Appelwick – bass guitar
