= The Kissaway Trail (album) =

Studio album by The Kissaway Trail
- Released: January 2007
- Genre: Indie rock
- Label: Bella Union

Singles from The Kissaway Trail
- 1. "Smother + Evil = Hurt" Released: April 2007; 2. "La La Song" Released: 2007; 3. "61" Released: 2007

Professional ratings
Review scores
Source	Rating
NME	(8/10)
Drowned in Sound	(7/10)

The Kissaway Trail is the self-titled debut studio album by Danish indie rock band The Kissaway Trail. It was released in January 2007 in Denmark, in April 2007 in the UK and Australia, and in May 2007 in mainland Europe and Scandinavia.

== Track listing ==
1. "Forever Turned Out to Be Too Long" - 2:31
2. "Smother + Evil = Hurt" - 3:31
3. "Tracy" - 3:07
4. "It's Close Up Far Away" - 4:35
5. "La La Song" - 3:04
6. "Soul Assassins" - 3:32
7. "61" - 4:26
8. "Sometimes I'm Always Black" - 3:57
9. "Eloquence and Elixir" - 4:10
10. "In Disguise" - 4:11
11. "Bleeding Hearts" - 4:41
