= Rise Ye Sunken Ships =

Studio album by We Are Augustines
- Released: June 6, 2011 (Digital Copy); August 23, 2011 (Physical Copy)
- Genre: Indie rock
- Label: Oxcart Records
- Producers: Augustines, Dave Newfeld

Rise Ye Sunken Ships is the debut album of indie rock band Augustines, released under their original band name We Are Augustines. It debuted on iTunes on June 6, 2011 and was later released on CD on August 23, 2011.

== History ==
The original concept for the album was envisioned by singer/guitarist Billy McCarthy while touring with his previous band, Pela. The title was the first idea he had. McCarthy's experiences with his mother and brother, both of whom where diagnosed schizophrenic, influenced nearly all of the writing for the album. McCarthy, Sanderson and the other two members had recorded most of the original album, but decided to scrap about 80 percent of it "because it just wasn't strong." Fights with their manager and record label along with disagreements within the band ultimately lead to the break up of Pela before the album could be finished. During that time, McCarthy's brother James committed suicide, further increasing the issues within the band.

McCarthy and Sanderson stayed in contact and eventually recorded a new song, “Book of James”, with producer David Newfeld. The duo decided they wanted to finish the entire album. McCarthy and Sanderson worked on the tracks in Sanderson's home studio. Once they finished, they released the album independently through iTunes and UNFD.

They announced their existence as a band by performing “Book of James”, “Chapel Song” and other songs at the Cutting Room Studio with John Richards of KEXP.

"Chapel Song" was featured on Starbucks' free 10-song Summer Mix sampler for 2011 and in a commercial for REI.

A music video for "Chapel Song" was produced/directed by Matthew C. Mills, an Emmy Award-winning Director and owner of Spacestation, who is known for his work on MTV Unplugged.

== Critical reception ==
Professional ratings
Review scores
Source	Rating
Liquid Hip	9.9/10
Allmusic	3.5/5 stars
eMusic	4.5/5 stars
Paste Magazine	8.5/10 stars
QRO	8.0/10 stars
Glide Magazine	4/5 stars
Riot Magazine	5/5 stars

The album has drawn high acclaim from critics. Justin Iger of Liquid Hip wrote, "Nearly every track on the 12-song album is perfectly executed as the set explores trying to carry on with life," and gave the album a 9.9 out of 10. Ryan Masteller of Critical Masses praised the album's deep meaning - writing, "Rise Ye Sunken Ships plays like a transformation – it’s horrific and captivating to see the stripping and reinterpretation of family meaning unfold as nakedly as it does." Steve Rippin of The Beat-Play Experiment wrote, "This band is the real deal and they have the real life strife to back up raw emotion on their debut record." Russell Mardell of Spike Magazine lauded McCarthy's vocals saying the album is, "brought to life in McCarthy’s astonishing vocals; a voice that could seep in to the soul as easily as it could break you to pieces." Luke Dixon of Live4Ever (UK) enjoyed the album, especially the track “Book of James” (a tribute to McCarthy's brother), which he states is, "a fitting tribute...from the moment you hear the first crack of the snare drum in the intro you are hooked, drawn along by its energy, stylish breakdowns and lyrical poignancy." Al Kaufman of Atlanta Music Guide referred to the album as "true genius" and predicted it would "end up on a lot of year end best-of lists." Sherin Malick of Riot Magazine stated, "Rise Ye Sunken Ships is a perfect album."

iTunes named Rise Ye Sunken Ships "Best Alternative Album" of 2011 in their Rewind year-end review.

== Track listing ==
No.	Title	Writer(s)	Length
1.	"Chapel Song"	Billy McCarthy, Nate Martinez	3:08
2.	"Augustine"	McCarthy	4:15
3.	"Headlong into the Abyss"	McCarthy	4:29
4.	"Book of James"	McCarthy	5:00
5.	"East Los Angeles"	McCarthy, Martinez	2:59
6.	"Juarez"	McCarthy	4:20
7.	"Philadelphia (City of Brotherly Love)"	McCarthy	4:18
8.	"New Drink for the Old Drunk"	Eric Bachmann	3:55
9.	"Patton State Hospital"	McCarthy	3:20
10.	"Strange Days"	McCarthy	3:02
11.	"Barrel of Leaves"	Chris Herb	3:08
12.	"The Instrumental"	Eric Sanderson	3:50
