= In the Pit of the Stomach =

Studio album by We Were Promised Jetpacks
- Released: 4 October 2011
- Genres: Indie rock, post-punk revival
- Length: 56:40
- Language: English
- Label: Fat Cat
- Producers: Andrew Bush, Peter Katis

We Were Promised Jetpacks chronology
The Last Place You'll Look (2010)	In the Pit of the Stomach (2011)	Unravelling (2014)

Singles from In the Pit of the Stomach
- 1. "Medicine" Released: 26 September 2011; 2. "Human Error" Released: 5 December 2011

Professional ratings
Aggregate scores
Source	Rating
Metacritic	73/100
Review scores
Source	Rating
AllMusic	4/5 stars
The A.V. Club	B+
Clash Music	8/10
Consequence of Sound	C−
Pitchfork Media	5.8/10
Rockfreaks.net	7.5/10
Rolling Stone	3.5/5 stars
SPIN	8/10

In the Pit of the Stomach is the second studio album by Scottish indie rock band We Were Promised Jetpacks, released on 4 October 2011 on Fat Cat Records.

== Track listing ==
All songs written by We Were Promised Jetpacks.

1. "Circles and Squares" - 5:19
2. "Medicine" - 3:46
3. "Through the Dirt and the Gravel" - 4:06
4. "Act on Impulse" - 5:31
5. "Hard to Remember" - 4:35
6. "Picture of Health" - 4:22
7. "Sore Thumb" - 5:17
8. "Boy In the Backseat" - 5:21
9. "Human Error" - 3:02
10. "Pear Tree" - 6:35
11. "Where I Belong" - 4:02 (Amazon bonus track)
12. "Build Me a Bridge" - 4:46 (iTunes bonus track)

== Personnel ==
We Were Promised Jetpacks

- Adam John Thompson – vocals, guitar
- Michael Palmer – lead guitar
- Sean Charles Smith – bass
- Darren Kenneth Lackie – drums

Additional musicians

- Andrew Bush - additional instrumentation
- Mike Truscott - additional instrumentation
- Solrun Sumarlioadottir - additional instrumentation

Technical personnel

- Andrew Bush – producer, recording, engineer
- We Were Promised Jetpacks - producer
- Peter Katis – additional production, mixing
- Paul Gold – mastering
- Alan Douches – mastering

Artwork

- dlt - artwork
