= Augustines (band) =

American indie rock band

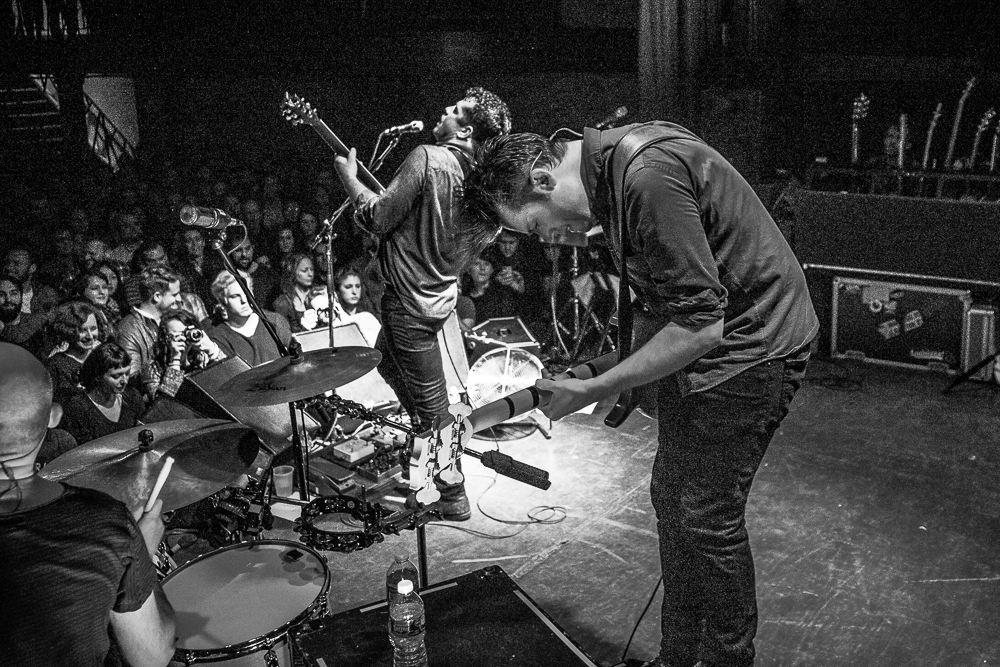
- Augustines live at the Bowery Ballroom in NYC in 2014

Background information
- Origin: Brooklyn, New York, United States
- Genres: Indie rock, alternative rock
- Years active: 2010–2016; 2024–
- Labels: Oxcart Records, Caroline, EMI, Votiv
- Members: William McCarthy; Eric Sanderson; Rob Allen; Yannis Panos (unofficially)

Augustines (formerly: We Are Augustines) is an American indie rock band based in Brooklyn, New York consisting of guitarist William McCarthy, multi-instrumentalist Eric Sanderson and drummer Rob Allen. Augustines are known for their intense shows and heavy interaction with the audience. Numerous shows saw the band leave the stage to perform on the floor with the fans.

== History ==
Following the break-up of their former band Pela, McCarthy and Sanderson decided to continue producing the songs that were originally supposed to comprise Pela's second studio album. The album, titled Rise Ye Sunken Ships, was released digitally on June 6, 2011. In September 2016, they announced that their fall tour was to be their last, following the break up of the band.

The band derived its name from the month of August. Both McCarthy and Sanderson were born in August, as was McCarthy's brother, James. James' story is one of the major influences behind their first album. Pela also dissolved very quickly ("In the span of two weeks") in August 2009. Originally, the new band was named Augustines. Since there were other bands with the same name, they changed the name to We Are Augustines.

In August 2013, the band announced via YouTube that they would return to using the name Augustines.

=== Formation and debut album ===
Material for Augustines' debut album originated when, with Pela, McCarthy wrote dozens of songs and Sanderson contributed many demos of his own. The band had close to 40 songs to pick from. Even though the album was nearly complete, they were unhappy with the results and wanted to re-record the material. "We had to do it twice because it just wasn’t strong," Sanderson said. Throughout the recording (and re-recording) process, the band fought with its record label, its manager and amongst themselves. Soon after, McCarthy learned his brother James had committed suicide. With all the issues surrounding the band, "Pela was unable to survive the storm," Sanderson said.

After deciding to part ways with the other two members of Pela, McCarthy and Sanderson eventually decided to finish the album. Having been through a terrible experience with the music labels and industry, "We knew that we wanted to proceed independently, but actually taking that on was a whole other challenge." With support from the indie music community, specifically John Richards of KEXP, they were able to finish the record. The album was produced by David Newfeld, who is best known for his work with Broken Social Scene. Their first performance of the new material, still under the original name Augustines, was for Richards and KEXP at the Cutting Room Studios on October 18, 2010. They released Rise Ye Sunken Ships independently on June 6, 2011 as a digital-only copy on iTunes.

Prior to the release of their first album, the band announced that Rob Allen had joined the band as the full-time drummer.

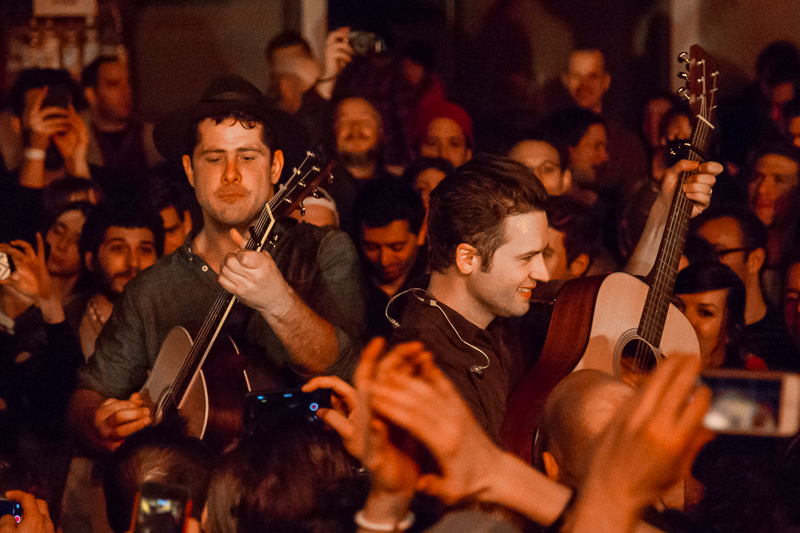
Augustines at the Bowery Ballroom

=== Rise Ye Sunken Ships (2011) ===
Rise Ye Sunken Ships was released in CD format in North America, Australia, and New Zealand on August 23, 2011. The album was released worldwide on March 5, 2012. The band then began a UK tour in support of the album in October 2011.

The album has been received positively by critics with The Sun and Music Fix naming the first single released in the UK, "Book of James", their single of the week.

The album covers a lot of very difficult subjects, the most prominent of these subjects are the untimely deaths of McCarthy's mother and brother. Rob Allen, the band's drummer, states that while there is a heavy focus on the painful subjects throughout the album the band also has a deep sense of positivity and hope. "The songs are about topics that happened over a period of time. They have a lot of meaning to us, especially Bill and that won't change, but, if anything, we are living proof that things can get better, opportunities can come your way and that is worth celebrating! We are jovial, energetic people who want to enjoy life and I think that's what you see when we perform." The band traveled extensively in the British Isles and Europe in support of the album, performing at festivals such as Pukkelpop, Reading & Leeds and large venues such as Shepherd's Bush. In 2014, the band toured the U.S. supporting Frightened Rabbit.

In June 2011, the music video for "Chapel Song" won the title of best music video at the Los Angeles Art-House film festival.

In March 2012 the band recorded a session at Abbey Road Studios

The band released the video for the third single to be taken from Rise Ye Sunken Ships, "Juarez", on April 11, 2012.

=== Augustines (2014) ===
In late 2013, the band spent several weeks in the studio of producer Peter Katis (Frightened Rabbit, We Were Promised Jetpacks, Jónsi Birgisson) working on their self-titled second album, Augustines. Upon completion of the album (released in early 2014) the band embarked on their first headlining U.S. tour, selling out most shows well in advance. Augustines returned to the UK in early April, and spent a great deal of the summer doing European festivals. After further US dates in the autumn, they returned to Europe. The band finished the year with a triumphant gig in front of 3000 at the London Roundhouse. This was filmed for use in a documentary about the band called Rise.

In August 2015, the band completed a UK/Europe tour and began work on their third album.

=== This Is Your Life and break up (2016) ===
Augustines released their third album, This Is Your Life on June 10.

It was announced on September 6 that their upcoming shows later in the year would be their last due to financial constraints.

Augustines played their final show on October 31, 2016 at the O2 Academy in Liverpool. They ended with 'Cruel City', from their second album. The entire show was broadcast via Facebook Live.

=== Post-Augustines ===
In 2017, McCarthy released his first solo album, Shelter. Produced by Sanderson, the album featured input from Allen, Pela drummer Tomislav Zovich, and Augustines regular Yannis Panos. McCarthy has since released three solo EPs: the bloodline (2019), Tryin' To See The Light (2020), and Ballad for the Unemployed (2020).

Sanderson also released his own solo project in 2017, Audio Journal Vol. 1: Bringing the Past to Light.

Rob Allen has collaborated on many other non-Augustines projects as a drummer and producer.

=== Reunion ===
In 2023 and 2024, the members started to tease their reunion, with the band's social media accounts returning to action in late 2024.

On Tuesday September 30 2025, the weareaugustines Instagram account posted a short video of the band playing accompanied by the message "HEAR YE HEAR YE! Its time my friends.... Augustines are back Stay tuned for news."

On 3rd May 2026, Augustines performed at Sing Us Home Festival in Manayunk, Philadelphia.

== Discography ==
Albums

- Rise Ye Sunken Ships (Oxcart Records, 2011) No. 186 US, No. 61 UK
- Augustines (2014) No. 141 US, No. 42 UK, No. 98 GER
- This Is Your Life (2016) No. 67 UK

EPs

- Rock the Vote (2012)
- iTunes Session (2012)

== Notable live appearances ==
- Counting Crows US Tour, Support (July–August 2012)
- The Boxer Rebellion UK Tour, Main support (March 2011)
- The Boxer Rebellion US Tour, Main support (April 2011)
- Daytrotter Barnstormer Tour (August 2011)
- Austin City Limits, Zilker Park, Austin, Texas (September 16–18, 2011)
- KEXP Radio Live (October 2011)
- BrooklynVegan CMJ Day Party (October 2011)
- XFM Winter Wonderland (December 2011)
- The Kaiser Chiefs UK Tour, Main support (December 2011)
- Band of Skulls US Tour, Main support (March 2012)
- Coachella 2012, Main Stage (April 2012)
- Sasquatch! Music Festival 2012, Quincy Washington, Yeti Stage (May 2012)
- Counting Crows Outlaw Roadshow Tour, Brooklyn, New York (July 2012)
- Flèche d'Or, Paris, France (October 20, 2012)
- O2 Shepherd's Bush Empire (October 2012)
- Frightened Rabbit US Tour, Main Support (September – October 2013)
- Sasquatch! Music Festival 2014, Quincy Washington, Sasquatch (Main) Stage (May 2014)
- Manchester Cathedral (December 1, 2014).

== TV appearances ==
- Late Show with David Letterman (February 24, 2012)
- Last Call with Carson Daly (April 27, 2012)
- The Tonight Show with Jay Leno (June 14, 2012)

== Singles and music videos ==
- "Chapel Song", Director: Matthew Mills, Released: 14 February 2011
- "Book of James", Director: Matt Amato, Released: 10 October 2011
- "Juarez", Director: Matt Amato, Released: 11 April 2012
- "Cruel City", Director: Bryan Schlam, Released: 7 October 2013
- "Nothing to Lose But Your Head", Released: 5 January 2014
