= Unravelling (album) =

Studio album by We Were Promised Jetpacks
- Released: 6 October 2014
- Recorded: Chem19 Studios, Glasgow, Scotland
- Genre: Indie rock; alternative rock
- Length: 47:12
- Label: FatCat Records

We Were Promised Jetpacks chronology
| In the Pit of the Stomach (2011) | Unravelling (2014) |

Professional ratings
Aggregate scores
| Source | Rating |
|---|---|
| Metacritic | 77/100 |
Review scores
| Source | Rating |
| AllMusic | 4/5 stars |
| Drowned in Sound | (8/10) |
| musicOMH | 4/5 stars |
| Consequence of Sound | B |
| PopMatters | (6/10) |
| Punknews.org | 3/5 stars |
| Exclaim! | (8/10) |

Unravelling is the third studio album by the Scottish indie rock band We Were Promised Jetpacks. It was released on 6 October 2014 in the United Kingdom and 14 October 2014 in the United States.

== Track listing ==
| No. | Title | Length |
|---|---|---|
| 1. | "Safety in Numbers" | 3:38 |
| 2. | "Peaks and Troughs" | 3:51 |
| 3. | "I Keep It Composed" | 3:50 |
| 4. | "Peace Sign" | 4:05 |
| 5. | "Night Terror" | 4:39 |
| 6. | "Disconnecting" | 5:19 |
| 7. | "Bright Minds" | 4:42 |
| 8. | "A Part of It" | 3:39 |
| 9. | "Moral Compass" | 4:24 |
| 10. | "Peace of Mind" | 6:30 |
| 11. | "Ricochet" | 4:45 |
| Total length: | | 47:12 |

== Release history ==
| Region | Date | Label | Format(s) |
|---|---|---|---|
| United Kingdom | 6 October 2014 | FatCat Records | CD, LP, digital download |
| United States | 14 October 2014 | FatCat Records | CD, LP, digital download |
