= These Four Walls (We Were Promised Jetpacks album) =

Studio album by We Were Promised Jetpacks
- Released: 15 June 2009
- Studio: Earth Studios, Odiham; additional production at Tarquin Studios, Bridgeport, Connecticut
- Genre: Indie rock, post-punk revival, emo
- Length: 49:36
- Language: English
- Label: FatCat
- Producer: Ken Thomas, Joylon Thomas, Peter Katis

We Were Promised Jetpacks chronology
These Four Walls (2009)	The Last Place You'll Look (2010)

Singles from These Four Walls
- 1. "Quiet Little Voices" Released: 4 May 2009; 2. "Roll Up Your Sleeves" Released: 29 June 2009; 3. "It's Thunder and It's Lightning" / "Ships With Holes Will Sink" Released: 30 November 2009

Professional ratings
Aggregate scores
Source	Rating
Metacritic	72/100
Review scores
Source	Rating
AbsolutePunk	90%
AllMusic	3/5 stars
The A.V. Club	A−
Clash	8/10
Drowned in Sound	7/10
Gigwise	positive
Pitchfork Media	6.7/10
Scotland on Sunday	4/5 stars
The Skinny	3/5 stars
This Is Fake DIY	7/10

These Four Walls is the debut studio album by Scottish indie rock band We Were Promised Jetpacks, released on 15 June 2009 in the UK, and on 7 July 2009 in the US by FatCat Records. The band recorded the album at Earth Studios in Odiham, Hampshire, England with producers Ken Thomas, Joylon Thomas, and Peter Katis. Four singles were released from the album: "Quiet Little Voices" in May 2009, "Roll Up Your Sleeves" in June 2009, and the double A-side single "It's Thunder and It's Lightning" and "Ships With Holes Will Sink" in November 2009. Following the album's release, an EP of alternate recordings and unreleased tracks entitled The Last Place You'll Look was issued in March 2010.

The album was reissued by FatCat as a double gold-coloured LP in July 2019 to mark its tenth anniversary. The expanded edition included 8 previously unreleased tracks chosen from early live performances, demos and radio sessions.

== Release ==
On 15 June 2009, the band celebrated the album's release with an acoustic performance at Buchanan Street HMV, and performed the album in its entirety at Glasgow's King Tut's Wah Wah Hut later that evening.

== Track listing ==
All tracks are written by We Were Promised Jetpacks, except where noted.

No.	Title	Length
1.	"It's Thunder and It's Lightning"	4:48
2.	"Ships With Holes Will Sink"	3:22
3.	"Roll Up Your Sleeves"	4:16
4.	"Conductor"	5:28
5.	"A Half Built House"	2:41
6.	"This Is My House, This Is My Home"	3:17
7.	"Quiet Little Voices"	4:21
8.	"Moving Clocks Run Slow"	4:56
9.	"Short Bursts"	4:40
10.	"Keeping Warm"	8:12
11.	"An Almighty Thud"	3:34

Bonus tracks on Australian CD edition
No.	Title	Length
12.	"Back to the Bare Bones"	4:13
13.	"The Fan"	1:27

Bonus tracks on 10th anniversary 2LP edition
No.	Title	Writer(s)	Length
12.	"Keeping Warm" (Acoustic Radio Session)
13.	"Move My Limbs" (Acoustic Radio Session)
14.	"Ships With Holes Will Sink" (Acoustic Radio Session)
15.	"Short Bursts" (Live at Barfly Glasgow)
16.	"Red Carpet" (Live at Barfly Glasgow)
17.	"Conductor" (Demo)
18.	"Quiet Little Voices" (Demo)
19.	"The Modern Leper" (Acoustic Radio Session; Frightened Rabbit cover)	Scott Hutchison

== Personnel ==
- Adam Thomson – vocals, guitar
- Michael Palmer – lead guitar
- Sean Smith – bass
- Darren Lackie – drums
- Ken Thomas – producer, recording, mixing ("A Half Built House", "Short Bursts" and "An Almighty Thud")
- Joylon Thomas – producer, recording, mixing ("A Half Built House", "Short Bursts" and "An Almighty Thud")
- Peter Katis – additional production, additional recording, additional instruments, mixing
- Greg Giorgio – additional mixing
- Alan Douches – mastering, mixing ("A Half Built House", "Short Bursts" and "An Almighty Thud")
- dlt – artwork
- Sounds on "A Half Built Home" taken from The Conet Project
