= The Golden Republic (album) =

Studio album by The Golden Republic
- Released: February 8, 2005
- Recorded: 2004
- Genre: Rock
- Length: 37:12
- Label: Astralwerks
- Producer: Peter Katis

The Golden Republic chronology
People (2004)	The Golden Republic (2005)

Professional ratings
Review scores
Source	Rating
AllMusic	2.5/5 stars
PopMatters	3/10

The Golden Republic is the only studio album by American rock band The Golden Republic. It was released in United States by Astralwerks on February 8, 2005.

== Track listing ==
All tracks written by The Golden Republic, except where noted.

1. "The Turning of the World" – 2:05
2. "You Almost Had It" (The Golden Republic, Deacon Konc) – 2:52
3. "She's So Cold" – 3:27
4. "I'll Do Anything" – 3:33
5. "Rows of People" – 3:52
6. "NYC" – 3:02
7. "Things We Do" – 4:37
8. "Robots" (The Golden Republic, Deacon Konc) – 3:03
9. "Not My Kind" (The Golden Republic, Deacon Konc) – 2:53
10. "Full of Yourself" (The Golden Republic, Deacon Konc) – 2:44
11. "You'll Get Old" – 5:04
