= The Loon =

Studio album by Tapes 'n Tapes
- Released: October 28, 2005 (U.S.); July 24, 2006 (UK)
- Recorded: June 2005, Short Man Studios, Minneapolis, Minnesota
- Genre: Indie rock
- Length: 41:23
- Labels: Ibid Records (Ibid 0002) (U.S.); XL Recordings (XL202) (UK)
- Producer: Erik Appelwick

Tapes 'n Tapes chronology
Tapes 'n Tapes (2004)	The Loon (2005)	Walk It Off (2008)

Professional ratings
Aggregate scores
Source	Rating
Metacritic	76/100
Review scores
Source	Rating
AllMusic	3.5/5 stars
TheMusicZine	4.5/5 stars
Being There Magazine	3.5/5 stars
NME	(8.0/10)
Pitchfork	(8.3/10)
PopMatters	(7/10)
Rolling Stone	3.5/5 stars
AmpCamp	(favorable)
Modern Music	(9/10)

The Loon is the debut album of the Minneapolis-based band Tapes 'n Tapes. It was originally self-released by the band's own Ibid Records on October 28, 2005 on compact disc. On July 24, 2006, the album was released in the United Kingdom on XL Recordings, on both CD and vinyl.

The album was generally well received by music critics, and earned numerous comparisons to the Pixies and Pavement. Pitchfork gave the album a favorable review, and gave it a "Best New Music" commendation.

The songs "Insistor" and "Cowbell" were released as singles in 2006 on XL Recordings. "Insistor" is also featured in the soundtrack of the video game Major League Baseball 2K7. In late 2006, the band's song "Jakov's Suite" (the final song of the album) began appearing in a television commercial for Nissan. It also appears in the University of Oregon's basketball advertisements during the games.

== Track listing ==
All songs written by Josh Grier.

1. "Just Drums" – 3:44
2. "The Illiad" – 2:15
3. "Insistor" – 4:20
4. "Crazy Eights" – 3:24
5. "In Houston" – 4:04
6. "Manitoba" – 4:12
7. "Cowbell" – 2:33
8. "10 Gallon Ascots" – 5:02
9. "Omaha" – 3:32
10. "Buckle" – 3:40
11. "Jakov's Suite" – 4:37

Japanese bonus tracks
No.	Title	Length
12.	"Frankfurt (Demo)"	1:55
13.	"Cowbell (KEXP Version)"	2:29
14.	"Omaha (KEXP Version)"	3:37
15.	"Jakov's Suite (KEXP Version)"	5:24
