= Greatest Hits (Remo Drive album) =

Studio album by Remo Drive
- Released: March 16, 2017
- Recorded: July 20 – November 8, 2016
- Studios: Sun Room, Bloomington, Minnesota
- Genres: Emo; punk rock; pop-punk; garage rock
- Length: 37:13
- Labels: Self-released, Epitaph (reissue)
- Producer: Remo Drive

Remo Drive chronology
Wait for the Sun (2015)	Greatest Hits (2017)	Pop Music (2018)

Singles from Greatest Hits
- 1. "Yer Killin' Me" Released: January 30, 2017; 2. "Crash Test Rating" Released: February 13, 2017; 3. "Eat Shit" Released: February 25, 2017; 4. "Art School" Released: March 13, 2017

Greatest Hits is the debut studio album by emo/indie rock band Remo Drive. It was self-released on March 16, 2017, and later reissued by Epitaph Records in 2018, when the band signed to the label. It is their only studio album with original drummer Sam Mathys. The music video for "Yer Killin' Me" has amassed over 4.4 million views on YouTube as of October 2024.

== Background ==
After the collapse of their previous musical project Kind of Incredible, Brothers Erik and Stephen Paulson founded Remo Drive in 2013 in Bloomington, Minnesota, where they released their first EP Remo Drive EP 1 and two singles. The following year, they were joined by Sam Mathys. After releasing a series of now-deleted singles and EPs on their Bandcamp throughout 2014 and 2015 with Mathys and substitute drummer Austin Voigt, the band reconvened in the studio in mid-2016 to begin work on a full-length album.

== Recording ==
In June 2016, the band began teasing their first full-length album on their Twitter, writing a series of songs for the new album titled the "Sam Jams", named after drummer Sam Mathys. Frontman Erik Paulson would come up with basic song structures and collaborate within the band to further refine his ideas into fully fleshed out tracks. The band intended to write 20 songs and select the best 10 for the album, but after writing 16 tracks the band felt they already had 10 songs they felt strongly about. Although the songs were not initially composed with any overarching concept in mind, Erik penned the lyrics with the intent of creating a thematic cohesiveness throughout the album.

The band previously recorded with local producer Andy Mathison at Immortal Audio on projects like Wait for the Sun, their "Breathe In" single, and their split EP with fellow local band Weathered. Dissatisfied with Mathison's production style, they opted to self-produce in their own recording space as they felt they worked better on their own. Recording sessions for the album began in July at Erik's "Sun Room Recordings" home studio set up at the Paulson family residence. Erik and bassist Stephen Paulson recorded their parts in the house's basement while Mathys recorded his drum parts in the living room.

When making the album, Erik wanted to break the band away from their earlier sound, feeling that the band's music to that point was "derivative". During the sessions, Erik experimented with guitar effects not heard on previous Remo Drive releases such as fuzz, delay, and reverb, intending to create a definite sound of their own while still keeping true to their influences. Vocals sessions for the album were held in Erik's bedroom around early October. Around that time, the band put out a tweet inviting fans to sing gang vocals on the record. Recording concluded on October 10 and was submitted for final mixing and mastering. The band selected Grammy-winning record producer Jack Shirley to oversee this process as they were impressed with his work with Jeff Rosenstock, Joyce Manor, and Deafheaven. The album was completed on November 8, 2016.

== Release ==
As early as October, the band was teasing the music video for the album's lead single "Yer Killin' Me". In January 2017, the band began hiding homemade CD-R singles throughout Minneapolis and Bloomington containing songs from the album as a publicity stunt. The band began gradually releasing standalone singles on their Bandcamp as well as accompanying music videos on their YouTube channel. The album was released independently on CD, streaming, and digital download on March 16, 2017, with colored vinyl releases later that year. In 2018, the band signed to Epitaph, who re-issued the album under their own label.

== Critical reception ==
Professional ratings
Review scores
Source	Rating
AllMusic	3.5/5 stars
Punknews.org	3.5/5 stars

Greatest Hits has gained positive reviews. AllMusic's Neil Z. Yeung remarked, "Packed with attitude and a healthy amount of riffs, Greatest Hits is music to blast with other outcast pals with chips on their shoulders, wiling the night away in the suburban wasteland." Sean Crawford from Punknews.org describes the album as "an exhilarating 37 minutes of emo flavored pop punk done right."

== Track listing ==
All tracks are written by Remo Drive.

No.	Title	Length
1.	"Art School"	3:15
2.	"Hunting for Sport"	3:55
3.	"Crash Test Rating"	2:34
4.	"Strawberita"	3:37
5.	"Summertime"	3:44
6.	"Eat Shit"	2:20
7.	"Trying 2 Fool U"	4:10
8.	"Yer Killin' Me"	3:54
9.	"I'm My Own Doctor"	4:27
10.	"Name Brand"	5:17
Total length:		37:13

== Personnel ==
- Erik Paulson - guitar, vocals
- Sam Mathys - drums
- Stephen Paulson - bass
