= The Last Place You'll Look =

EP by We Were Promised Jetpacks
- Released: 9 March 2010
- Recorded: Winter 2009
- Genre: Indie rock
- Length: 19:33
- Language: English
- Label: Fat Cat
- Producer: We Were Promised Jetpacks, Andrew Bush

We Were Promised Jetpacks chronology
These Four Walls (2009)	The Last Place You'll Look (2010)	In the Pit of the Stomach (2011)

Professional ratings
Review scores
Source	Rating
AbsolutePunk	87%
Drowned in Sound	6/10
The Line of Best Fit	(positive)
PopMatters	5/10
The Skinny	4/5 stars

The Last Place You'll Look is an EP by the Scottish indie rock band We Were Promised Jetpacks, released on 9 March 2010 in the US and Canada, and on 12 April 2010 in the UK and Europe by Fat Cat Records.

In comparison with the band's first album, These Four Walls, The Last Place You'll Look has more subdued instrumentation, with additional string accompaniments appearing on the majority of the tracks.

== Background and recording ==
The EP was recorded within a two-week deadline by the band's sound engineer, Andrew Bush. The band are said to have entered the studio with only "rough sketches" and "older versions" of songs as their starting point.

== Track listing ==
All songs written by We Were Promised Jetpacks.

1. "A Far Cry" – 4:52
2. "Short Bursts" (alternative version) – 3:37
3. "The Walls Are Wearing Thin" – 1:53
4. "With the Benefit of Hindsight" – 4:13
5. "This Is My House, This Is My Home" (alternative version) – 5:00

== Personnel ==
We Were Promised Jetpacks

- Adam Thompson – vocals, guitar
- Michael Palmer – lead guitar
- Sean Smith – bass guitar
- Darren Lackie – drums

Additional musicians

- Andrew Bush – additional instrumentation
- Suz Appelbe – additional instrumentation
- Helena Flint – additional instrumentation
- Mike Truscott – additional instrumentation

Technical personnel

- Andrew Bush – recording, mixing, producer
- We Were Promised Jetpacks – producer
- Alan Douches – mastering

Artwork

- dlt – artwork
