= Tapes 'n Tapes (EP) =

EP by Tapes 'n Tapes
- Released: 2004
- Recorded: Webster, Wisconsin, United States
- Genre: Indie rock
- Label: Ibid Records
- Producer: Self-produced

Tapes 'n Tapes chronology
Tapes 'n Tapes (2004)	The Loon (2005)

Tapes 'n Tapes is Tapes 'n Tapes' first released EP on Ibid Records. The self-titled, self-produced 7-track EP was recorded in a secluded cabin situated in the middle of the Wisconsin wintry wilderness. According to interviews with the band, the cabin lacked functional indoor plumbing during the winter, forcing the band to "shit in the snow for four days", giving the album its rough sound. The success of the EP led to the band's second recording session, which produced their debut album The Loon in the following year.

== Track listing ==
1. "Beach Girls"
2. "My Name’s Not Heratio"
3. "50’s Parking"
4. "Icedbergs"
5. "The Lion"
6. "Moldy Bread"
7. "8 or Ate"

== Personnel ==
- Josh Grier – vocals, guitar
- Matt Kretzmann – bass
- Karl Schweitz – drums
