= Michael Shelley (musician) =

American singer-songwriter

Michael Shelley is a New York City–based singer-songwriter. He has released 5 albums. He has opened tours in the United States for They Might Be Giants, Shonen Knife & Marshall Crenshaw, in Japan. Some members of Belle & Sebastian have played on his records & with him live on UK tours. Michael Shelley is also a disc jockey at freeform radio station WFMU, known for his weekly interviews with musicians.

== Discography ==
- Jimmy's Corner (May 15, 2015 – Confidential Recordings) a 30 song album of instrumental songs
- Leftovers (2012 – Confidential Recordings) a collection of live tracks, non-lp cuts, cover songs and various rarities.
- Goodbye Cheater (2005 – Confidential Recordings)(Confidential was co-founded by Shelley in 2001)
- I Blame You (2001 – Bar None)
- Too Many Movies (1998 – Big Deal) (released in UK on Shoeshine Records, 2001)
- Half Empty (1997 – Big Deal)
- Four Arms To Hold You (1998 – Big Deal) a collaborative effort with Scottish musician Francis MacDonald (BMX Bandits, Teenage Fanclub, etc.) under the band name "Cheeky Monkey".

=== Also Appears on ===
- He's A Rebel: The Gene Pitney Story Retold (2002 – To M'Lou Music) performing "Walk"
- What the World Needs Now ... Big Deal Artists Perform The Songs of Burt Bacharach (1998 – Big Deal) performing "Baby It's You"
