= Pela (band) =

American indie rock band

- Photo by Brendon Stuart

Background information
- Origin: Brooklyn, New York
- Genre: Indie rock
- Years active: 2004–2009
- Label: Unsigned
- Spinoffs: Augustines
- Members: William McCarthy; Nate Martinez; Eric Sanderson; Tomislav Zovich
- Past members: Christopher Herb; Josh Kaufman; Brian Shevlin; Andrew Squire

Pela was an American indie rock band from Brooklyn known for their intense live performances.

== History ==
Pela's history goes back to the early ’90s when lead vocalist and guitarist William McCarthy met Christopher Herb. As best friends they worked at a mall together after dropping out of high school, and then traveled around the world together playing music in various cities. Herb and McCarthy began a folk project called Igloo Gazelle in New York City in 2001. In early 2002, Herb had a chance meeting with Eric Sanderson on a subway platform at 7th avenue in Brooklyn where Herb was busking. Sanderson was invited to a practice session and joined the band shortly thereafter.

In late 2002, Herb abruptly moved to Australia for four years. Sanderson & McCarthy soon broke up Igloo Gazelle and teamed with guitarist Nate Martinez. Martinez and Sanderson met as roommates in college (in upstate New York) and played in many bands together both during and after theirs schooling. Both schoolmates are classically trained musicians in multiple genres of music. After a succession of drummers, they found Tomislav Zovich who remained in the band for the duration.

They released a physical EP in 2005 on Brassland label, owned by Brooklyn/Cincinnati band The National, and a download-only EP Exit Columbia Street, in 2006. In 2007 the group signed with independent label Great Society, who released their debut full-length, album, Anytown Graffiti, in April 2007. The group has played with Sonic Youth, The Flaming Lips, The Decemberists, Norah Jones, Sleater-Kinney, The National, Mission of Burma, Gaslight Anthem, Gossip, Devendra Barnhart, British Sea Power, and Feist. Pela severed ties with Great Society in 2008.

Anytown Graffiti, recorded with Dan Long, was met with wide acclaim and landed itself on over 35 "Best Of" Lists for 2007 including Yahoo! and the KEXP Listeners Poll. As well, in October 2008, Pela's Anytown Graffiti was voted No. 112 in KEXPs countdown of the Top 903 Albums Of All Time.

On September 18, 2009, the band announced on their website and Facebook site that they have broken up citing difficulties with record labels and personal injuries.

Guitarist Martinez now has a solo project named Thieving Irons.

In 2010, singer/songwriter William McCarthy and bassist Eric Sanderson formed a band called Augustines. Due to a trademark conflict, they renamed the band to We Are Augustines and relaunched their website in December 2010. In 2013, they were able to reclaim their original name, Augustines.

== Discography ==
- All in Time EP (Brassland, 2005)
- Exit Columbia Street EP (download-only, 2006)
- Anytown Graffiti (Great Society, 2007)

== Members ==
- Nate Martinez - guitar, keyboards, vocals
- Billy McCarthy - vocals, guitar
- Eric Sanderson - bass, keyboards, vocals, percussion
- Tomislav Zovich - drums, vocals

== Touring Members ==
- Josh Ricchio (2009–Break up) – keyboards, guitar, vocals, percussion
