= Remo Drive =

American rock band

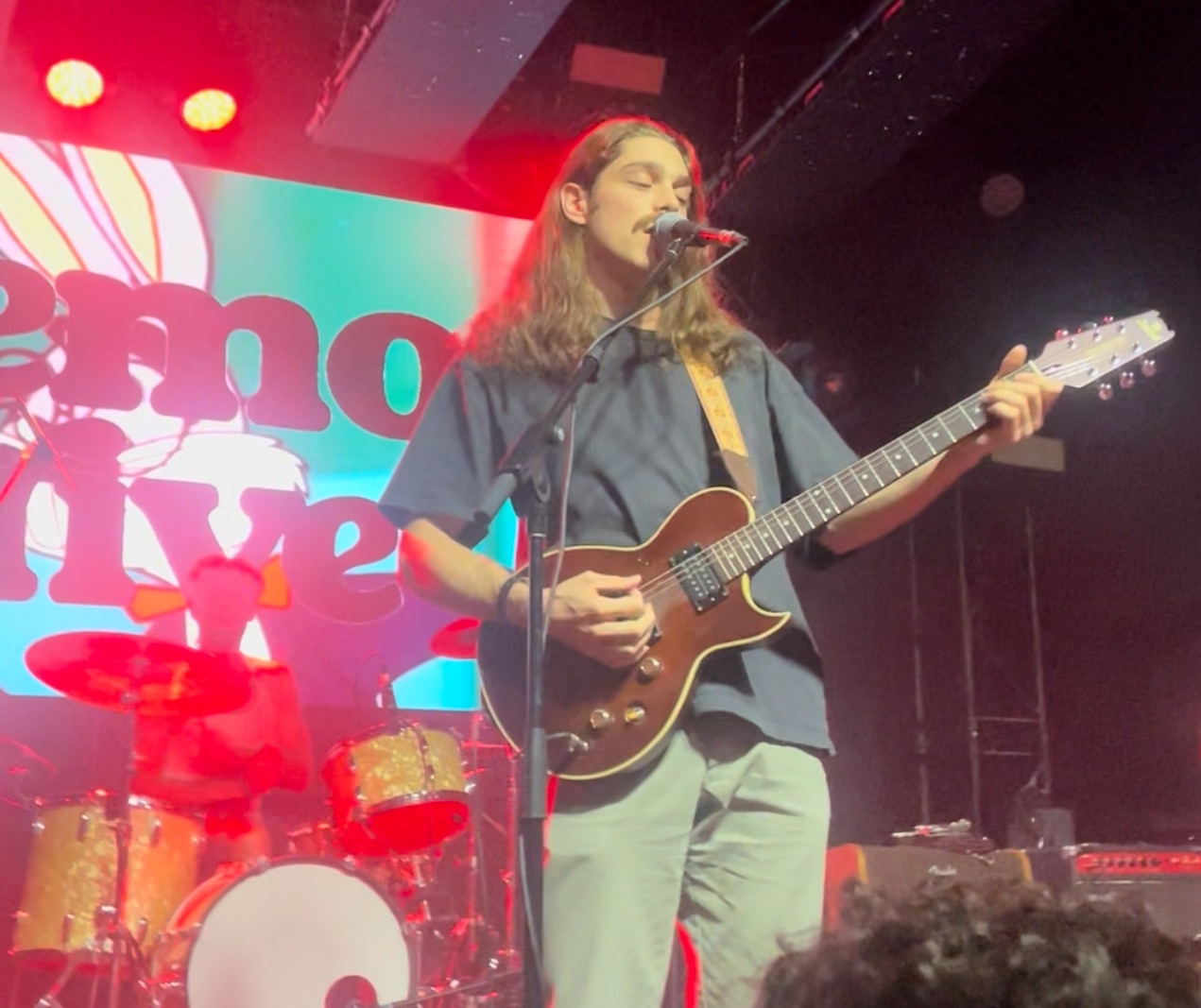
- Remo Drive performing in Toronto, Ontario in 2025

Background information
- Origin: Bloomington, Minnesota, U.S.
- Genres: Indie rock; alternative rock; emo; post-hardcore (early)
- Years active: 2013–present
- Label: Epitaph
- Members: Erik Paulson; Stephen Paulson; Sam Becht
- Past members: Sam Mathys; Austin Voigt
- Website: www.remodriveband.com

Remo Drive is an American rock band from Bloomington, Minnesota. They released their first full-length album titled Greatest Hits on March 16, 2017. Their second studio album Natural, Everyday Degradation was released on May 31, 2019. Their third, A Portrait of an Ugly Man, was released on June 26, 2020. Their fourth, Mercy, was released on February 23, 2024.

== History ==
=== Early history (2013-2015) ===
Remo Drive began in 2013 when brothers Erik and Stephen Paulson were in high school. They noticed other students wearing shirts for the band Title Fight and were introduced to their music through mutual friends. Erik and Stephen both got interested in the band and decided they wanted to pursue a similar sound in their own music. They had previously played in a handful of other bands throughout high school but never had a solidified lineup, temporarily recruiting friends and switching around instruments for whenever they performed live.

The band first earned its name when bassist Stephen Paulson decided to spontaneously incorporate the drum brand, Remo, into a band name. The band subsequently started recording demos in 2013, also known as EP 1. Without a designated drummer in the band, the two brothers both recorded drums themselves for this first release. This EP was later taken down from the internet a few months later, again leaving the band without any publicly available music. Stephen later met original drummer Sam Mathys while they were both in a different band, and quickly recruited him for Remo Drive. In late 2014, the band released a compilation of songs on Bandcamp under the title Demos 2014. These recordings were the band's first time recording with Mathys, and compiled two previously released EPs Away and Stay Out Longer, as well as various demos recorded throughout the year that the group would burn onto CDs and hand out at shows.

In 2015 Mathys left the band due to creative differences, and Erik met the band's second drummer, Austin Voigt, through playing in a band called Closer to Yellow. That same year, Remo Drive released their first music on a record label, with the EP Wait For The Sun on Lost State Records, along with splits with the bands Unturned and Weathered. The band's 7" single Breathe In / Perfume was later released the same year on Really Rad Records and Endless Bummer Records. In early 2016 Voigt left the band due to personal hardship, but remained on good terms with the brothers, while Mathys amended relations with the two and rejoined the band.

=== Greatest Hits, and mainstream breakthrough (2016–2017) ===
In March 2016 the band began working on their first LP. The band approached the writing process for this album differently from their previous work, feeling that their previous music was too derivative and similar to other emo bands, and instead pursued creating their own unique sound while also taking inspiration from a wider range of different genres and artists, incorporating sounds from decades such as the '70s and '80s in an attempt to pull musical inspiration from places uncommon for the emo genre.

Their first single of the new album cycle, "Yer Killin Me", was released in January 2017, alongside a new music video. The video, featuring frenetic tracking shots of the Paulson brothers and Mathys running around the Minneapolis suburbs, caught the eye of prominent music critic Anthony Fantano. He featured it on his Twitter page, resulting in an "explosion of popularity."

In March 2017, Remo Drive self-released their first full-length album, Greatest Hits, featuring "Yer Killin Me", "Art School", and "Crash Test Rating".

Upon its release, the album rapidly gained critical success and earned the band a larger audience. Sputnikmusic described the band as “revitaliz[ing] the things that truly make this genre so special,” while punknews.org wrote that Greatest Hits was “an exhilarating 37 minutes of emo flavored pop punk done right” and praised its “youthful energy.” Anthony Fantano of The Needle Drop similarly praised the album’s “quality memorable hooks” and “fun explosive performances,” describing it as “a good debut album” that has been “turning heads” throughout the year, but felt that the band still had much to improve on, adding that "since it seems like the band is getting quite a bit of attention off of this record, hopefully they can springboard off of this into something even better."

Following the attention from Greatest Hits, Remo Drive was selected as support for McCafferty's August/September 2017 and Sorority Noise's March/April 2018 headlining tour, playing in major cities across North America. After the band's first major tour, Erik began to write material intended for a solo album. The concept was scrapped, but some of these songs were eventually used on the band's future albums.

On August 3rd, 2017, the band released a live album, Remo Drive on Audiotree Live, recorded with Audiotree while on tour.

In December 2017, Remo Drive began to go through major internal changes, and Sam Mathys was privately removed as a member of the band. This was part of the band's upcoming transition to being signed by a major record label.

=== Epitaph Records and Natural, Everyday Degradation (2018-2019) ===
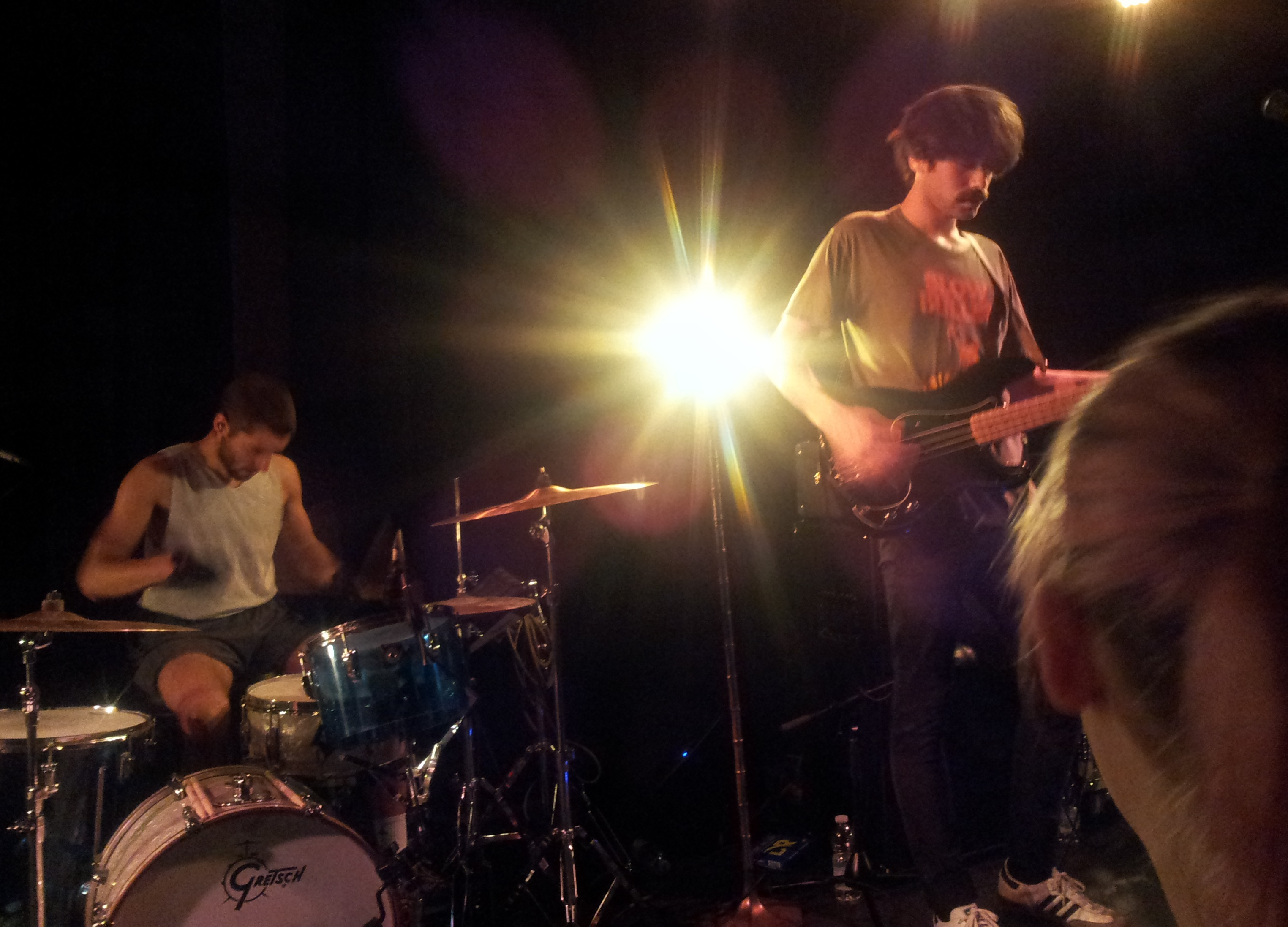
Stephen Paulson and Sam Becht performing in Montreal, 2019

On February 10th, 2018, Mathys publicly announced on social media that he had been removed as a member of Remo Drive in December 2017. The Paulson brothers followed with their own statement, stating that the "situation did not work for the three of us as a band" and creative differences as the reason once again. Later that month on February 23rd, 2018, the band announced that they had signed with Epitaph Records. This announcement came alongside the release of a single, Blue Ribbon, from their EP Pop Music, which was released on March 9. This would be the last Remo Drive release to feature Sam Mathys.

Throughout 2018 to early 2019, Braeden Keenan filled in as a touring drummer. Keenan had previously worked with Erik and Stephen in high school for their previous band, Kind Of Incredible.

During the summer of 2018, the band began to record demos for what would eventually become their next album. Similarly to their previous album, the band approached the writing process differently, taking stronger influence from the narrative-driven songwriting of artists like Bruce Springsteen and The Killers. Cameron Bartlett of the band Author accompanied the band to track drums for these sessions. Bartlett did not continue to officially join the band's lineup, but was credited as a co-writer on certain tracks for the final album. The demos leaked in March of 2019 under the name Songs I Think Rock, and were mistakenly spread around with the belief that it was the final retail version of the album.

In late August 2018, Remo Drive announced that they were planning on recording a new album that December. During the studio sessions, the band recruited Sam Becht, Braeden Keenan and Shane Wood to record drum parts. On April 22, 2019, the band released a double A-side single, "Two Bux/The Grind". In May of that year, Erik Paulson announced that he hid promo CDs of the next single around Twin Cities, Minnesota, before releasing "Around the Sun" as a single on May 14. On May 31, 2019, Remo Drive released their sophomore album Natural, Everyday Degradation. The band embarked on a headlining tour through late May to early July in promotion of the album, with support from Slow Pulp, Slow Bullet and Heart to Gold.

In early 2019, touring guitarist Zack Cummings was removed from the band with no official statement. The band temporarily recruited William J Leach until eventually settling on Dane Folie as their new touring guitarist.

In late 2019, Sam Becht joined the band as a permanent studio and touring member, and Remo Drive posted on social media that they were working on their third album.

=== Current work (2020–present) ===
On April 28, 2020, Remo Drive announced their third album, A Portrait of an Ugly Man, for a June release, along with the first single, "Star Worship" on the same day. Two other singles were released, "Ode to Joy 2" on May 18, 2020 and "A Flower and a Weed" on June 17, 2020. The album released on June 26, 2020, along with another single "Easy as That".

In early April 2023, Remo Drive announced on social media that they were wrapping up production of their latest album. On October 31, 2023, the band released their first single, "No, There's No Hope For You", from their then-untitled upcoming album. Their next single, "New In Town", was released on December 6, 2023. The title of the album, Mercy, was officially announced on January 12, 2024, along with the title track "Mercy" as the lead single. On February 7, 2024, the band released "All You'll Ever Catch", the final single prior to the album's release. The album released on February 23, 2024.

On October 18, 2024, Mercy received a deluxe reissue. This included a cover of their song "Please, Please Be Smart" by the band Wilt. On December 6th, the band re-released a compilation of tracks from their early discography, titled Early Works. The compilation consists of the Wait For The Sun EP, and singles released from 2015 to 2016. This is the first time the band has officially shared these tracks since they were taken down prior to the release of Greatest Hits. The compilation only features songs recorded with Austin Voigt, as the band was not able to come to an agreement with Sam Mathys.

In late 2024, Dane Folie left the band to focus on his personal life. The band recruited Tim Houston as their new touring guitarist, who they had previously collaborated with during the recording of Mercy.

On July 11th, 2025, the band issued a 5-year anniversary edition of A Portrait of an Ugly Man, remixed by audio engineer Phil Ek.

On April 26th, 2026, the band self-released a double A-side single, "Is She Hiding a Broken Heart/Live in Pain". This is the first time the band has released new material without Epitaph Records since their original self-release of Greatest Hits.

== Musical style ==
Remo Drive's earlier work is typically described as emo that incorporates elements of pop punk, dance punk, post-hardcore, and in some tracks/recordings grunge and punk rock, influenced by bands including Title Fight, PUP, Jeff Rosenstock, Vampire Weekend, and Weezer. The group has also self described themselves as emo and associated themselves with the emo revival. In recent years, the group has progressed into a more indie rock inspired sound with influence from power pop, indie folk, chamber pop, classic rock, and hard rock. The band has listed a number of acts as influences including Queens of the Stone Age, Father John Misty, The Killers, Interpol and The Beach Boys.

== Personnel ==
Current official members

- Erik Paulson – vocals, guitar (2013–present)
- Stephen Paulson – bass (2013–present)

Studio members

- Sam Becht – drums, percussion (live, 2018–present; studio, 2019–present)

Former members

- Sam Mathys – drums, percussion (2013–2014, 2016–2018)
- Austin Voigt – drums, percussion (2014–2016)

Touring members

- Tim Houston - guitar (2024-present)

Former touring members

- Zack Cummings – guitar (2016–2019)
- Braeden Keenan – drums, percussion (2016, 2018)
- Lee Tran – saxophone, synthesizer, tambourine (2018–2019)
- Micheal Kwan – keyboard, auxiliary percussion (2017)
- William J Leach – guitar (2019)
- Dane Folie – guitar (2019-2024)

== Discography ==
=== Studio albums ===
Title	Album details
Greatest Hits	Released: March 16, 2017; Label: Self-released (initial release), Epitaph (re-release); Format: LP, CD, digital download, streaming
Natural, Everyday Degradation	Released: May 31, 2019; Label: Epitaph; Format: LP, CD, digital download, streaming
A Portrait of an Ugly Man	Released: June 26, 2020; Label: Epitaph; Format: LP, digital download, streaming
Mercy	Released: February 23, 2024; Label: Epitaph; Format: LP, digital download, streaming

=== Compilation albums ===
Title	Compilation album details
Demos 2014	Released: December 24, 2014; Label: Self-released; Format: Digital download
Early Works	Released: December 6, 2024; Label: Self-released; Format: LP, digital download, streaming

=== EPs ===
Title	EP details
Remo Drive EP 1	Released: November 2013; Label: Self-released; Format: Digital download
Away	Released: March 2014; Label: Self-released; Format: CD, digital download
Stay Out Longer	Released: August 13, 2014; Label: Self-released; Format: CD, digital download
Wait for the Sun	Released: May 1, 2015; Label: Self-released; Format: CD, cassette, digital download
Pop Music	Released: March 9, 2018; Label: Epitaph; Format: 7", digital download, streaming
Natural, Everyday Extended Play	Released: October 1, 2019; Label: Epitaph; Format: 7", digital download, streaming

=== Split EPs ===
Title	Split EP details
Remo Drive // Unturned (with Unturned)	Released: February 14, 2015; Label: Rolling Green; Format: Cassette, digital download
Weathered // Remo Drive (with Weathered)	Released: March 1, 2015; Label: Rolling Green, Endless Bummer; Format: 10", cassette, digital download

=== Live EPs ===
Title	Live EP details
Remo Drive on Audiotree Live	Released: August 24, 2017; Label: Self-released; Format: Digital download

=== Bootlegs ===
Title	Bootleg details
Songs I Think Rock	Released: March 17, 2019; Format: Digital download

=== Singles ===
Title	Year	Album
"Hyland"	2013	Remo Drive EP 1
"Rainman" / "Stable"	2013	Non-album singles
"Pulp Friction"	2013	Non-album singles
"My Good Friend Is a Pro Sk8er" (Note: Listed as "My Good Friend Is a Pro Skater" on the Demos 2014 compilation album.)	2014	Stay Out Longer
"Breathe In" / "Perfume"	2015	Non-album singles
"Lookin' Under the Tree"	2016	Non-album singles
"Yer Killin' Me"	2017	Greatest Hits
"Crash Test Rating"	2017	Greatest Hits
"Eat Shit"	2017	Greatest Hits
"Art School"	2017	Greatest Hits
"Blue Ribbon"	2018	Pop Music
"Two Bux" / "The Grind"	2019	Natural, Everyday Degradation
"Around the Sun"	2019	Natural, Everyday Degradation
"Nearly Perfect"	2019	Natural, Everyday Extended Play
"Shakin'" (Erik Paulson mix)	2019	Natural, Everyday Degradation
"Star Worship"	2020	A Portrait of an Ugly Man
"Ode to Joy 2"	2020	A Portrait of an Ugly Man
"A Flower and a Weed"	2020	A Portrait of an Ugly Man
"No, There's No Hope for You"	2023	Mercy
"New in Town"	2023	Mercy
"Mercy"	2024	Mercy
"All You'll Ever Catch"	2024	Mercy
"Is She Hiding a Broken Heart" / "Live In Pain"	2026	Non-album singles

=== Music videos ===
Song	Year	Director
"Heartstrings"	2015	Erik Paulson & Faith Christensen
"Lookin' Under the Tree"	2016	Unknown
"Yer Killin' Me"	2017	Lee Tran & Erik Paulson
"Crash Test Rating"	2017	Trevor Sweeney
"Eat Shit"	2017	Lee Tran & Erik Paulson
"Art School"	2017	John Mark
"I'm My Own Doctor"	2017	John Mark
"Blue Ribbon"	2018	John Mark
"Around the Sun"	2019	Adam Peditto
"Romeo"	2019	Olive Lagace
"Star Worship"	2020	Remo Drive
"Ode to Joy 2"	2020	Unknown
"Easy as That"	2020	Unknown
"No, There's No Hope for You"	2023	James Kerr
"New in Town"	2023	Sydney Ostrander
"Mercy"	2024	Sydney Ostrander
"All You'll Ever Catch"	2024	Andy Grund
