= The Kissaway Trail =

Danish indie rock band

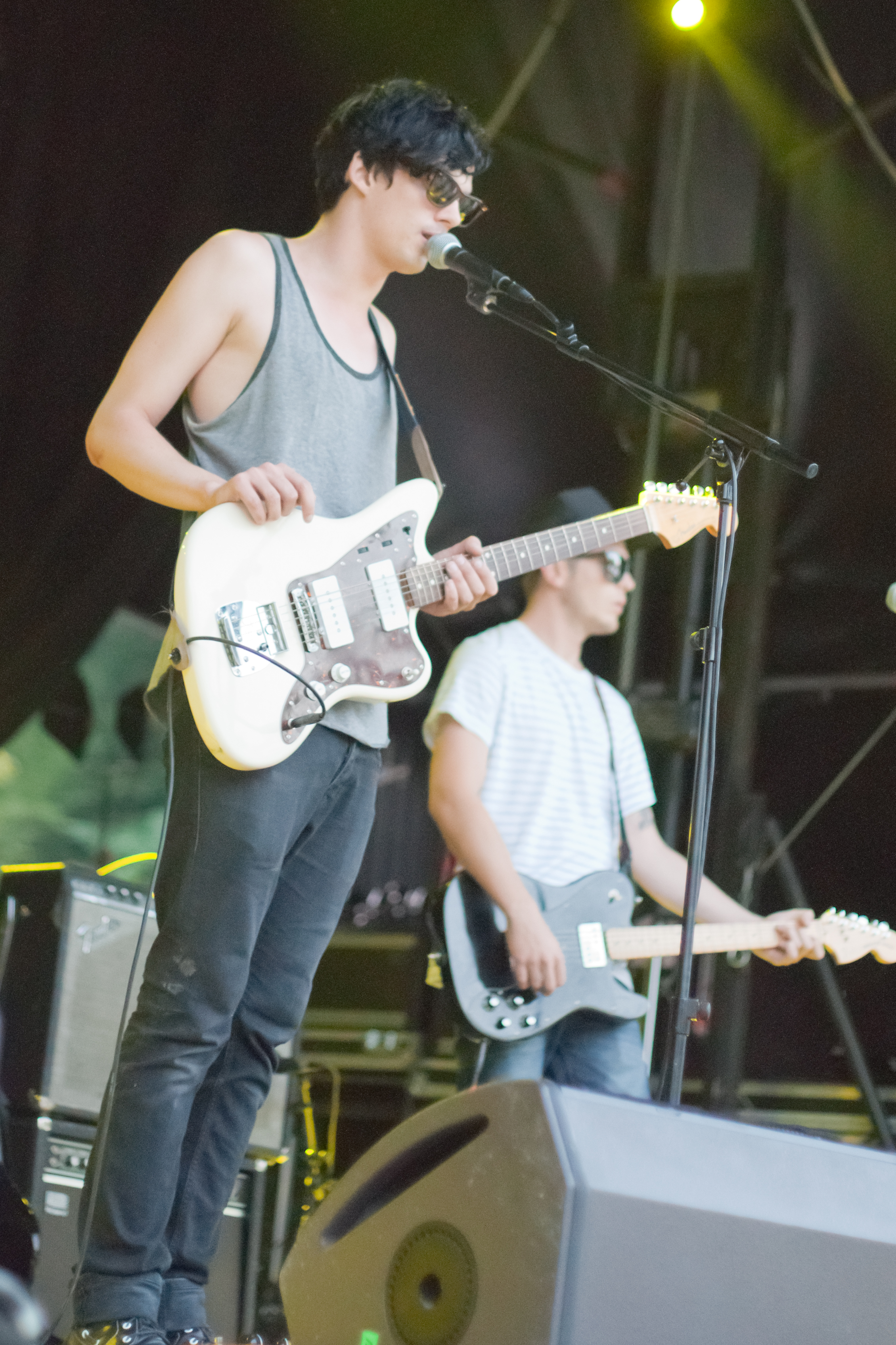
- The Kissaway Trail

Background information
- Origin: Odense, Denmark
- Genres: Indie rock
- Members: Thomas L. Fagerlund; Søren B. Corneliussen; Hasse Mydtskov
- Website: Official website

The Kissaway Trail are a three-piece indie rock band from Odense, Denmark.

== History ==
The four members of The Kissaway Trail (Søren, Thomas, Gabriel and Rune) originally recorded together under the name 'Isles', and did a self-released album called "We have decided not to die" in 2005. Since then, an additional guitarist, Daniel, while Thomas started to sing alongside Søren making the distinctive two lead-vocal sound that they have today. Various tracks from this early period of the band's history can still be downloaded from Danish music websites. The band's musical existence very nearly ended when Søren lost his love for music after his father was killed under tragic circumstances. However, he made his own decision to start performing and recording again, and The Kissaway Trail started to create their debut album.

Their material is released in Europe (aside from Scandinavia) and Japan by Bella Union, Etch n Sketch in Australia and New Zealand, and Playground Music in Scandinavia. On their breakthrough album local producer Niels Høg helped them in the studio.

The title of their song 61 relates to the number of days a band member had to wait to hear if their family member had a terminal illness. The member involved is kept under wraps for very personal reasons; some fans believe it is Hasse, the drummer, because he has a tattoo of the number '61' on his chest.

In the Autumn of 2007, The Kissaway Trail acted as the main support for Editors on their UK and European tours, alongside Ra Ra Riot in the UK and The Boxer Rebellion in Europe.

The band have cited influences to their music include The Beach Boys, Grandaddy, Daniel Johnston, Placebo and Sonic Youth, amongst others. Their sound has also been compared to that of the Polyphonic Spree and Canadian band Arcade Fire.

The band have been known for their live performances, which have included songs from The Kissaway Trail as well as b-sides such as "Romeo and Romeo" and "La Mia". They have also performed at the Wireless, Latitude and SXSW festivals in 2007, and the Montreaux Jazz Festival in 2008, where they supported Interpol and The National, and Lollapalooza in 2010.

=== Current activities ===
In 2009 the band teamed up with Heineken Music Ireland to perform two live free gigs in Dublin and at the Cork Opera House on December 9 and December 10.

The band planned to release their new album entitled Sleep Mountain in March 2010. The advance single "SDP" was able to be downloaded for free from the band's Facebook page. In March and April 2010, the band played in North America in opening support of Australian band The Temper Trap.

In December 2011, The Kissaway Trail announced that their former bassist Rune Pedersen and guitarist Daniel Skjoldmose would leave the band but that they would continue playing as a trio.

On May 14, 2013, Yep Roc Records announced that The Kissaway Trail's forthcoming album Breach would be released on August 20, 2013.

== Members ==
Current

- Thomas Fagerlund – vocals, guitar, synth
- Søren Corneliussen – vocals, guitar, synth
- Gabriel Espinoza Diez – drums, percussion, backing vocals

Former

- Daniel Skjoldmose – guitar,(2006–2012)
- Rune Pedersen – bass, backing vocals (2005–2012)

== Discography ==
=== Albums and EPs ===
- Into the Ocean and Rise Again (EP, October 2006)
- The Kissaway Trail (LP, January 2007)
- Sleep Mountain (LP, March 2010)
- Nørrebro (Life Is a B-Side) (EP, May 2013)
- Breach (LP, August 2013)

=== Singles ===
- "La La Song" (2007)
- "61" (2007)
- "Smother + Evil = Hurt" (April 2007, re-release February 2008)
- "SDP" (2010)
- "Beat Your Heartbeat" (July 2010)
- "New Lipstick" (2010)
- "Nørrebro" (March 2013)
- "The Springsteen Implosion" (2013)
- "Sarah Jevo" (2013)
