= The Golden Republic =

American rock band

The Golden Republic was an American rock band, originally formed in Kansas City, Missouri, in 1999 under the name People by founding members Ben Grimes and Ryan Shank.

In 2003, the Golden Republic signed to Astralwerks, releasing one album and one EP. The band's album received a two-and-a-half-star rating from AllMusic, and a score of three from PopMatters.

The band split up in December 2006 and Kenn Jankowski went on to form the Republic Tigers.

== Band members ==
- Ben Grimes – guitar, lead vocals
- Kenn Jankowski – guitar, keyboards
- Harry Anderson – bass
- Ryan Shank – drums

== Discography ==
=== Studio albums ===
- The Golden Republic, released February 8, 2005

=== EPs ===
- People, released September 21, 2004

=== Compilation ===
- Their final single "Hemel Dalingen" was included on the compilation First Blood on OxBlood Records in 2008.
