= Satanicide =

American metal band

- Origin: New York City, U.S.
- Genre: glam metal
- Years active: 1999–present
- Members: Dale May; Phil Costello; Andrew Griffiths; Patrick Quade
- Past members: Pemberton Roach; Jake Garcia; Drew Thurlow; Royce Peterson
- Website: satanicide.com

Satanicide are an American, New York City-based mock metal/glam metal band formed in 1999 that styles themselves and their music to represent, tongue-in-cheek, the heavy metal music scene of the 1980s in New Jersey. Self-described as portraying a lifestyle "where the mullet and kick-ass rock 'n' roll still live", the members sport big hair and spandex and leather stagewear. As part of their presentation, Satanicide plays party anthems and power ballads with a mixture of satire and affection. In 2003, the group were described in The Drama Review as an "irreverent, demonic death-metal turned glam turned cock-rock band". The original four member band consists of frontman Dale "Devlin Mayhem" May, guitarist Phil "Aleister Cradley" Costello, drummer Andrew "Sloth Vader" Griffiths, and bassist Pemberton "The Baron Klaus Von Goaten" Roach. Pemberton was replaced by bassist Jake "Vargas Von Goaten" Garcia in 2003, who was subsequently replaced by Drew Thurlow, followed by Patrick Quade.

== History ==
In the late 1990s, Dale May (a photographer) and Phil Costello were in a group called Peanut 23. Peanut 23's quirky original songs were far from successful. One night, both Dale and Phil put on their girlfriends' wigs and spent the evening "acting like a couple of kids in from Jersey, kicking over trash cans, talking the talk." After a positive reception that night to an uninvited, impromptu performance on a club's stage, Dale and Phil decided to form their own band. Drummer Andrew Griffiths was recruited from a trip hop band called Puracane, and bassist Pemberton Roach was added to complete Satanicide.

In August 1999, Satanicide played the Maxwell's music club in Hoboken, New Jersey. Previously used to getting perhaps 30 people to come out for a Peanut 23 show, Satanicide brought in hundreds. In January 2003, Satanicide played a gig at the Sundance Film Festival in support of a short film made by the band.

By March 2003, Satanicide were a popular act on the New York music scene. Their humorous stage shows were viewed as creating a certain mood which allowed for improvized audience embellishment. The William Morris Agency agreed to represent Satanicide and worked with the band to produce a film treatment for a television series. However, Dale and Phil's songwriting chemistry did not translate into scriptwriting chemistry and the treatment was tabled.

Four years after they formed, Satanicide sought to replace bassist Pemberton Roach in August 2003 because Pemberton "secretly liked Billy Joel." In advertising for the bassist position, Satanicide listed the required qualifications as musical "chops"; "hott [sic] girlfriend to share with band"; "disposable income to buy coke, booze and whores"; and "when hearing the Dave Matthews Band, must be overcome by impulsive desire to kill." Darediablo's Jake Garcia took over as the Baron's younger brother Vargas Von Goaten in 2003. The current bassist is Sebastian Von Goaten.

In September 2004, the website heatherband.com was created. In December 2004, Satanicide announced that they had changed their name to Heather, listing heatherband.com as their website. In addition, the group became "the group formerly known as Satanicide", jettisoning the big-hair wigs and at least some of the shtick. In July 2005, Satanicide announced that they were getting together for a reunion performance at the Bowery Ballroom, a music venue in the Bowery section of New York City. Some question whether they in fact broke up in the first place.

By May 2005, Satanicide had appeared in a Cingular commercial and were headlining at the Bowery Ballroom. In April 2007, the Chinese gangsta rap trio Notorious MSG released their Lunch Money EP, with Satanicide's vocalist Dale "Devlin Mayhem" May providing the chorus vocals to the Warlord song.

In 2007, Phil co-founded Tragedy: All Metal Tribute to the Bee Gees and Beyond, with New York City musician Royce Peterson.

In 2008, Patrick Quade became Satanicide's bassist, assuming the stage name "The Baron Klaus von Goaten IV". From 2012 to 2014, Tragedy's Royce Peterson joined Satanicide on lead guitar, under the stage name "Rolls Royce Peterson".

== Presentation ==
In the Satanicide act, the band members hurl themselves into the crowd to scatter their fans as a way of mocking the rocker practice of stage diving/crowd surfing. They wear Barbie wigs to give them the big hair appearance of a glam metal rocker. In addition to this New York-based band claiming that they are from "Jer-Z", they spout elaborate lies related to casual sex conquests and call to mind This Is Spinal Tap, the 1984 mockumentary directed by Rob Reiner about a fictional renowned metal band. The Satanicide members typically wear sleeveless T-shirts and circulation-inhibiting leather pants while they mimic many styles of metal. Their act calls to mind a mixture of Probot, Tenacious D, The Darkness, The Decline of Western Civilization Part II: The Metal Years, The Upper Crust, and This Is Spinal Tap.

== Members ==
- Dale May – lead singer
- Phil Costello – guitarist
- Andrew Griffiths – drummer
- Patrick Quade – bassist

== Discography ==
- Heather – 2003 The title track of Satanicide's debut album, Heather, is a Bic-lighter ballad about a girl whose name "everybody knows . . . from reading the bathroom stalls." Also on the album is a Dungeons & Dragons game tribute called "20 Sided Die" that summons the spirit of Ronnie James Dio, as well as a Bon Jovi-like ode to the big city called "NYC 2 Nite".
- Cradle the Balls – 1997

== See also ==
- The Darkness
