= Going the Distance (soundtrack) =

2010 soundtrack album

Going the Distance (Original Motion Picture Soundtrack)

Soundtrack album by various artists
- Released: August 24, 2010 (standard); September 14, 2010 (deluxe)
- Genre: Pop; rock; R&B; alternative pop; alternative rock; electropop; indie rock; punk rock
- Length: 59:07 (standard); 71:10 (deluxe)
- Label: WaterTower Music
- Producer: Dana Sano; Eric Scully; Alessandra Stuart

Going the Distance (Original Motion Picture Soundtrack) is the soundtrack album to the 2010 film Going the Distance directed by Nanette Burstein, and starring Drew Barrymore and Justin Long. The film's soundtrack features 16 songs from various artists and was released through WaterTower Music on August 24, 2010, with an accompanying deluxe edition released on September 14.

== Background ==
The soundtrack featured three original songs performed for the film by the Boxer Rebellion, and had contributions from the Airborne Toxic Event, Passion Pit, Band of Skulls, and the Cure. In addition to writing two songs, the band also appeared in the film. Its frontman and lead singer Nathan Nicholson, recalled that they had played a show in April 2009 at the Troubadour in Los Angeles, which was attended by executives from New Line Cinema. Though their involvement in the film was limited to the contribution of songs, upon meeting the director Nanette Burstein, they were asked to play them on camera. In a span of one month, they wrote and recorded three songs, while two of them were shot. Dana Sano served as the music supervisor, and compiled the soundtrack with Eric Scully and Alessandra Stuart. The album, featuring 16 tracks, was released through WaterTower Music on August 24, 2010, and a deluxe edition with three additional tracks was released on September 14.

== Track listing ==
Going the Distance (Original Motion Picture Soundtrack) — standard edition
No.	Title	Artist(s)	Length
1.	"Either Way"	Generationals	3:16
2.	"Places"	Georgie James	3:07
3.	"Hey Na Na"	Katie Herzig	2:33
4.	"In Transit"	Albert Hammond Jr.	3:33
5.	"Just Like Heaven"	The Cure	3:32
6.	"Don't Get Me Wrong"	The Pretenders	3:48
7.	"Spitting Fire"	The Boxer Rebellion	2:51
8.	"Could We"	Cat Power	2:22
9.	"Cold Fame"	Band of Skulls	6:11
10.	"Prizefighter"	Eels	2:53
11.	"The Reeling (Groove Police Remix)"	Passion Pit	3:41
12.	"Harold T. Wilkins, or How to Wait for a Very Long Time"	Fanfarlo	4:03
13.	"Here Comes a Regular"	The Replacements	4:47
14.	"If You Run"	The Boxer Rebellion	4:49
15.	"Learnalilgivinanlovin"	Gotye	2:50
16.	"Half of Something Else"	The Airborne Toxic Event	4:49
Total length:			59:07

Going the Distance (Original Motion Picture Soundtrack) — deluxe edition
No.	Title	Artist(s)	Length
17.	"Evacuate"	The Boxer Rebellion	3:30
18.	"Miss Me"	Joe Purdy	4:41
19.	"40 Day Dream"	Edward Sharpe and the Magnetic Zeros	3:54
Total length:			71:10

== Reception ==
James Christopher Monger of AllMusic wrote "Offering up a winning blend of indie rock royalty and post-punk/alt-rock icons Going the Distance is the sound of you, the twenty/thirtysomething listener, pressing the shuffle button your smart phone/MP3 player." Lonnie Nemiroff of The Miami Hurricane wrote "With the perfect blend of light heartedness and profoundness in the soundtrack, Going the Distance can only radiate more with liveliness once characters are involved." Justin Chang of Variety felt the music choices "often feel weirdly dated" while Empire's Ian Freer noted the use of extensive indie rock and alternative rock.

== Chart performance ==
Chart (2010)	Peak position
US Top Soundtracks (Billboard)	25
