= Outside (Tapes n' Tapes album) =

Studio album by Tapes 'n Tapes
- Released: January 11, 2011
- Studio: The Terrarium, Minneapolis, MN
- Genre: Indie rock
- Label: Ibid Records

Tapes 'n Tapes chronology
Walk It Off (2008)	Outside (2011)

Professional ratings
Aggregate scores
Source	Rating
Metacritic	66/100
Review scores
Source	Rating
AllMusic	3.5/5 stars
The A.V. Club	(C+)
Consequence of Sound	3.5/5 stars
The Phoenix	3/4 stars
Pitchfork	(5.5/10)
PopMatters	(5/10)
Slant Magazine	2.5/5 stars
Spin	5/10 stars
Tiny Mix Tapes	3.5/5 marks

Outside is the third album from the Minneapolis-based band Tapes 'n Tapes, released on January 11, 2011.

== Track listing ==
All songs written by Josh Grier.

No.	Title	Length
1.	"Badaboom"	3:56
2.	"SWM"	2:45
3.	"One in the World"	2:49
4.	"Nightfall"	4:51
5.	"Desert Plane"	3:43
6.	"Outro"	2:47
7.	"Freakout"	4:04
8.	"The Saddest of All Keys"	3:50
9.	"Hidee Ho"	4:44
10.	"People You Know"	2:33
11.	"On and On"	4:28
12.	"Might Long"	3:50
Total length:		44:20

== Band members ==
- Josh Grier – guitar, vocals
- Jeremy Hanson – drums
- Matt Kretzman – keyboards, multi-instruments
- Erik Appelwick – bass guitar
