= Natural, Everyday Degradation =

Studio album by Remo Drive
- Released: May 31, 2019
- Genre: Power pop; indie rock; alternative rock
- Length: 38:39
- Label: Epitaph
- Producer: Joe Reinhart, Peter Katis

Remo Drive chronology
Pop Music EP (2018)	Natural, Everyday Degradation (2019)	Natural, Everyday Extended Play (2019)

Singles from Natural, Everyday Degradation
- 1. "Two Bux / The Grind" Released: April 22, 2019; 2. "Around the Sun" Released: May 14, 2019; 3. "Shakin'" Released: December 6, 2019

Natural, Everyday Degradation is the second studio album by Remo Drive, released on May 31, 2019.

== Background ==
As early as 2016, the band began demoing songs for the album shortly after the Greatest Hits sessions wrapped. Natural, Everyday Degradation was recorded after the departure of drummer Sam Mathys in February 2018 with drum parts being recorded by Braeden Keenan & Sam Becht. When asked about the change of musical style of Natural, Everyday Degradation in an interview, Erik Paulson replied, "...as far as like, styles go, I think just our, our tastes have changed, we've grown up a little bit. And uh, not wanting to fit in quite as neatly in with, I feel like there's kind of a scene with a bunch of bands that do a similar, kind of upbeat, kind of party emo thing right now, and I think, more than anything, we just wanted to separate ourselves from what was going on, and make it clear that we're, kind of on our own path and not a part of a group, or a scene, or a clique or anything."

== Reception ==
Professional ratings
Review scores
Source	Rating
The Alternative	(unfavorable)
Punknews.org	7/10
AllMusic	4/5 stars

Critical reception on Natural, Everyday Degradation was mixed. The Alternative gave the album a "disappointing" for a score, as the editor states, "Natural, Everyday Degradation falls flat. Each track borrows things from each other, and not in a way that allows each track to stay as an individual song. The album overall is really disappointing and feels as if the band played it safe. I hope that on future releases they will take back the initiative and push the envelope a bit more like I know they are capable of doing." In a YUNO review (a short, quick opinionated review to give thoughts on an album) by Anthony Fantano, he says, "I'm just utterly disappointed with what the band has delivered on this new project with Epitaph. I think their sound, I think their performance, I think their delivery has, for the most part, just really lost its ‘teeth.’ Everything seems toned down in the worst way possible." Nick Fuenes of Merry-Go-Round Magazine would state: "Unfortunately, on their sophomore release, NATURAL EVERYDAY DEGRADATION, there’s a fatal eagerness: the band takes on the tacky maximalism that defined much of their forebears’ late periods and fails to improve on it."

More favorable reviews came in the form of 7/10 from Punk News, and 4/5 from AllMusic.

== Track listing ==
All tracks are written by Remo Drive, except where noted.

No.	Title	Length
1.	"Two Bux"	2:38
2.	"The Grind"	3:46
3.	"The Devil"	4:01
4.	"Shakin'" (Remo Drive, Kevan Larson)	4:02
5.	"Dog"	3:12
6.	"Separate Beds"	4:07
7.	"Ezra and Marla"	3:51
8.	"Halos"	4:22
9.	"Around the Sun"	3:08
10.	"Mirror"	3:15
11.	"The Truth" (Remo Drive, Cameron Bartlett)	2:17
Total length:		38:39

== Personnel ==
Remo Drive

- Erik Paulson – lead vocals, guitar, synthesizer, electric piano, upright piano, organ, percussion
- Stephen Paulson – bass guitar, synthesizer, piano, organ

Additional musicians

- Sam Becht – drums (tracks 1, 4-6, 8, 10)
- Braeden Keenan - drums (tracks 2, 11)
- Shane Woods - drums (tracks 3, 7, 9)
- Grant Whiteoak - backing vocals (track 4)
- Lee Tran - saxophone, piano, electric piano
