= We Were Promised Jetpacks =

Scottish indie rock band

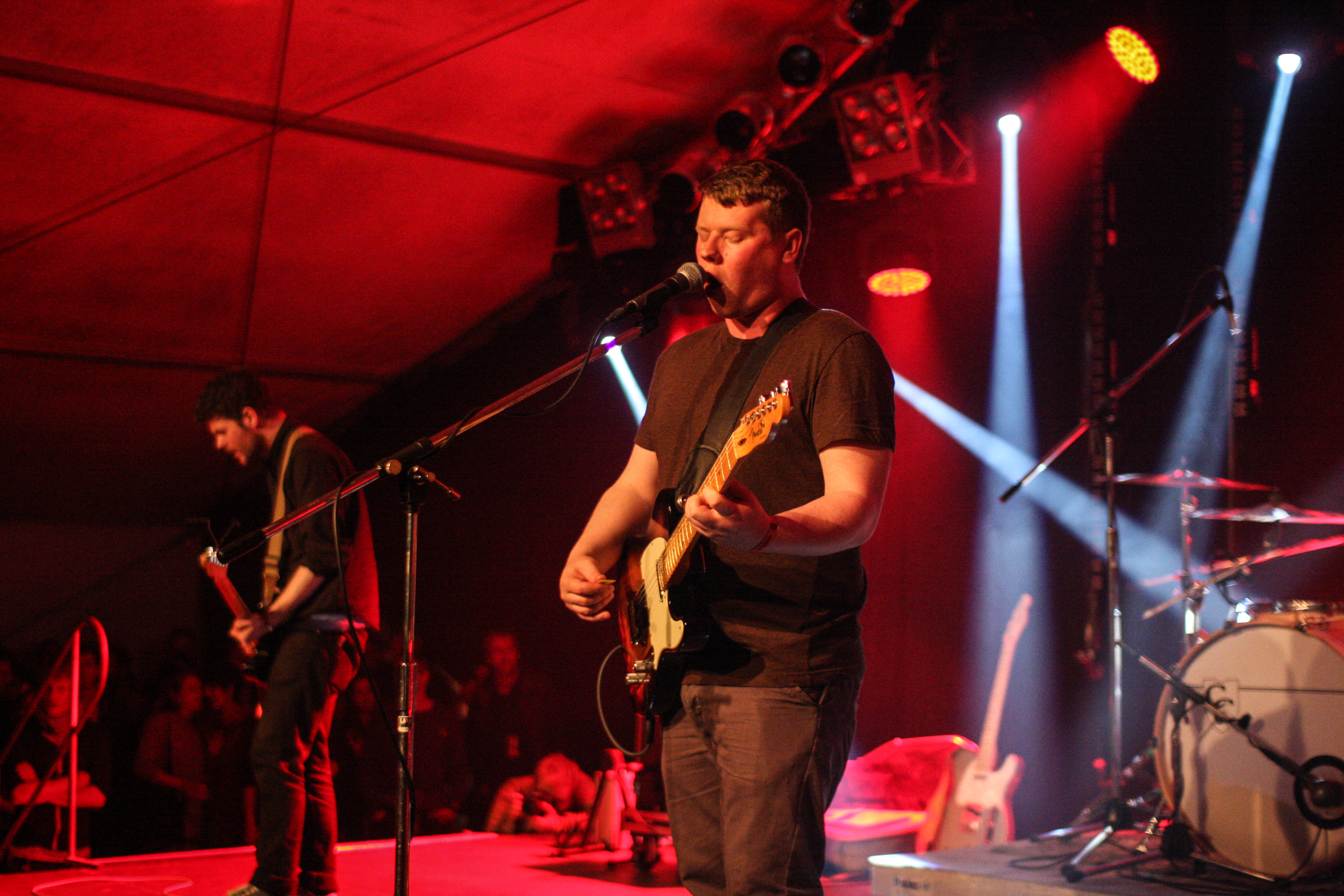
- We Were Promised Jetpacks performing at Immergut Festival 2013 (Germany)

Background information
- Origin: Edinburgh, Scotland
- Genres: Indie rock, post-punk revival
- Years active: 2003–present
- Labels: Fat Cat Records, Big Scary Monsters
- Members: Adam John Thompson; Sean Charles Smith; Darren Kenneth Lackie
- Past members: Stuart Michael McGachan; Michael Palmer
- Website: wewerepromisedjetpacks.com

We Were Promised Jetpacks are a Scottish indie rock band originally from Edinburgh, formed in 2003. The band consists of Adam Thompson (vocals, guitar), Sean Smith (bass) and Darren Lackie (drums). Stuart McGachan (keyboards, guitar) was a member of the band from 2012 to 2015. On 2 July 2019, founding member Michael Palmer (guitar) announced that he was leaving the band.

The band's debut album, These Four Walls, was released on 15 June 2009 on Fat Cat Records. In October 2011 the band released their second full-length album, In the Pit of the Stomach. They released E Rey: Live in Philadelphia, a recording of the last show of their 2012 tour, in February 2014. The band's third album, Unravelling, was released in October 2014.

In March 2018 the band began recording their fourth album. The album, titled The More I Sleep The Less I Dream, was released on 14 September 2018. Their fifth album, Enjoy the View, was released on 10 September 2021.

The band has cited labelmates Frightened Rabbit and The Twilight Sad as influences, alongside Biffy Clyro's early material. Thompson also cited Scotland itself as a major influence on their music: "It's rainy and miserable in Scotland and there are lots of angry people. In a way, that's a big part of why our music sounds the way it does. It's music that sounds sort of like that".

== History ==
=== Beginnings ===
We Were Promised Jetpacks formed in Edinburgh, in 2003. The band played their first gig at their school's "battle of the bands" competition, which they won. The four-piece eventually relocated to Glasgow:

"There was a time when we first moved to Glasgow (we grew up and went to school in Edinburgh, then three of us moved to Glasgow and one of us to Stirling) and started playing proper gigs in proper venues. Playing in Edinburgh before was weird as we were underage, so ended up playing some odd nights. Which was cool, but when we moved to Glasgow we were of drinking age and we started playing places like Sleazy's and whatnot. We felt like a proper band."

In September 2008, the band supported Frightened Rabbit during their tour for The Midnight Organ Fight. The band signed to Fat Cat Records after the label listened to some tracks on their MySpace following a recommendation from future labelmates Frightened Rabbit.

=== These Four Walls ===
On 15 June 2009 the band released their debut album, These Four Walls, and performed the album in full at King Tut's Wah Wah Hut. The album reached No. 27 on the US Billboard Heatseekers chart. Between late 2009 and early 2010, the band toured America, with support from Cincinnati-based band Bad Veins. Their early 2010 tour also included support from Brooklyn-based band Bear Hands and Washington natives The Lonely Forest. In March 2010, the band released a new EP, entitled The Last Place You'll Look. In October 2010 the band toured in North America to open for Jimmy Eat World. On 15 October 2010, their song "Quiet Little Voices" was featured on the Persian-language political satire show, Parazit, on Voice of America and their song "An Almighty Thud" was featured in the opening sequence in Sons of Anarchy episode, "Turas", on 2 November 2010. On 7 December 2010, the single "It's Thunder and It's Lightning" from the album These Four Walls was played on season 8, episode 11, "Darkness on the Edge of Town" of the CW network's successful television series, One Tree Hill, and on season 1, episode 8 of the Showtime series, "Shameless". Their song "Quiet Little Voices" is also featured in the 2011 comedy Hall Pass with Owen Wilson, as well as on a fictional radio station in The Crew (video game). The band recorded four of the album's tracks ("Roll Up Your Sleeves", "This Is My House, This Is My Home", "An Almighty Thud", and "Ships With Holes Will Sink") for a 30 June 2010 Daytrotter session. The track "Keeping Warm" was also featured in the trailer for the 2013 coming-of-age comedy-drama, The Kings of Summer.

In 2019, to mark the album's 10th anniversary, it was reissued on vinyl and digitally with extra tracks, all recorded during gigs or radio sessions.

=== In the Pit of the Stomach ===
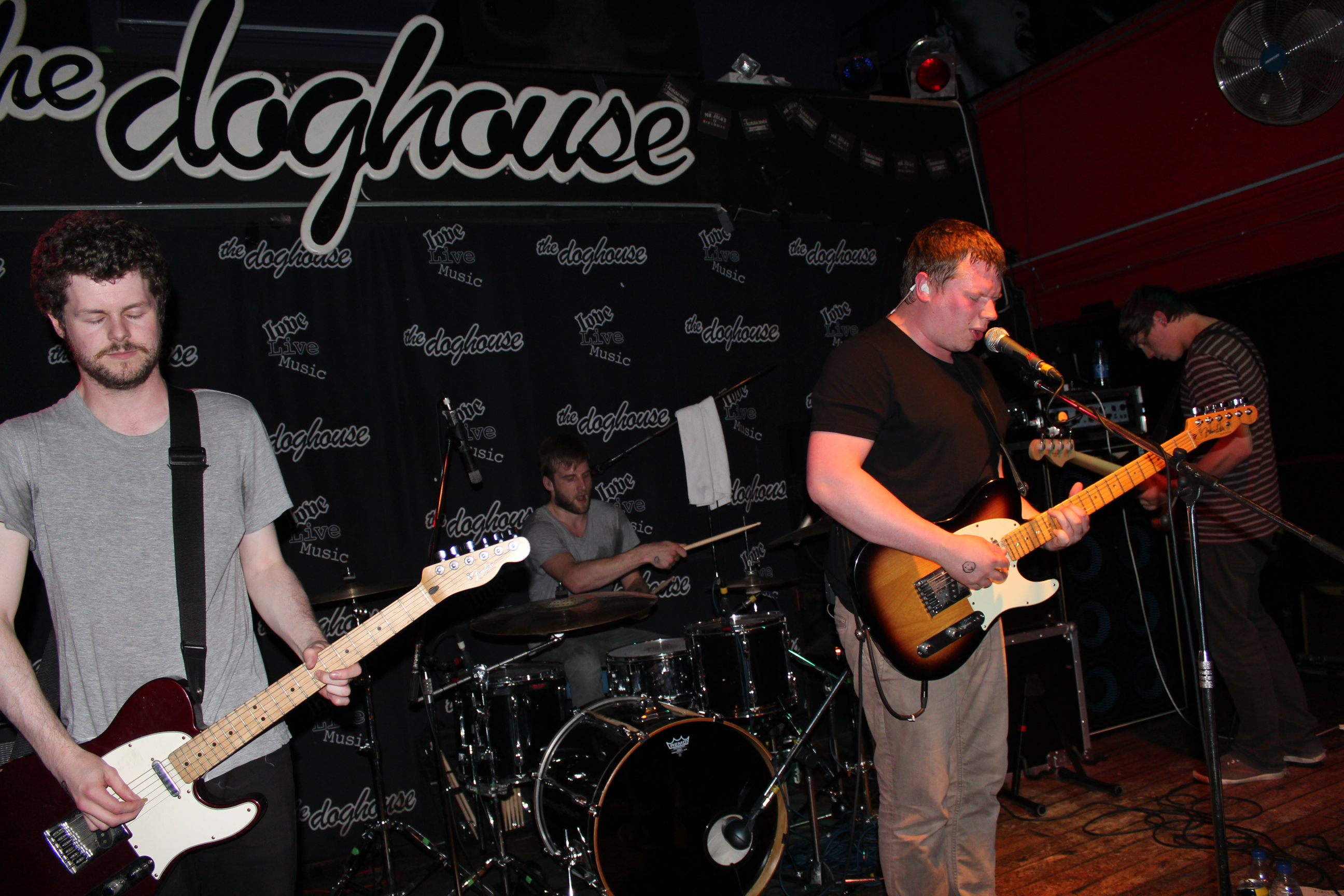
We Were Promised Jetpacks performing in Dundee in May 2012.

In July 2011, the band announced their second album, In the Pit of the Stomach, and released the track, "Act on Impulse". The album was released on 4 October 2011. It was met with general approval from music critics, and achieved an overall rating of 7.3/10 at AnyDecentMusic? based on 23 reviews.

=== Unravelling ===
The third album, Unravelling, was released on the 6 October 2014 in the UK and 14 October in the US. The album was 11 tracks long with a combined length of roughly 48 minutes. The album was recorded and mixed at Chem19 Studios in Glasgow, Scotland.

=== The More I Sleep The Less I Dream ===
After the band revealed that they changed labels to Big Scary Monsters, they announced their fourth album, and it was released on 14 September 2018. As the members matured, the band collectively feared losing the playfulness that made them indie rock critic's favourites. Instead of fighting that dread, the band channelled it into the most refined, mature record to date. The band members have been playing together since their teenage years, and were all turning 30 which influenced the process and sound of the music. The album was recorded in early 2018 with producer Jonathan Low (The National, Sufjan Stevens, Kurt Vile, the War on Drugs) at Miner Street in Philadelphia and Long Pond in New York's Hudson Valley. Prior to that it took them a while to write the right songs, as they essentially wrote an album and decided they didn't like any of it; threw the material away to make the album that was released. The band's official press release on the album describes the album as: "The More I Sleep The Less I Dream marks a new chapter in We Were Promised Jetpacks' career. It's about going back to the heart of who they are, a high school band that never stopped. It's about four people who have grown up together, making a conscious choice to keep writing music and seeing where that takes them".

In July 2019, guitarist Michael Palmer announced he was leaving the band, concluding a US tour with the band. Further gigs that year were performed with guest musicians Andy Monaghan (Frightened Rabbit) or Ross Clark (Fiskur).

=== Enjoy the View ===
The band's fifth album was released on 10 September 2021, again on Big Scary Monsters. The album was preceded by the singles "If It Happens", "Fat Chance" and "Not Me Anymore".

The band toured the album in Europe and North America throughout 2022, with former Frightened Rabbit member Andy Monaghan as touring guitarist. In late 2022 they released a two-part EP, A Complete One-Eighty, featuring three reworkings of songs from Enjoy the View and three remixes of tracks from that album, made by Monaghan, Zoe Graham and Manchester Orchestra.

The band's last live performances so far took place in summer 2023. Later that year, the band cancelled a support slot with The Front Bottoms a few weeks before the American band's UK tour, citing "personal reasons".

== Discography ==
=== Studio albums ===
Title	Album details	Peak chart positions						
Title	Album details	SCO	UK	UK Indie	US	US Alt.	US Indie	US Rock
These Four Walls	Released: 15 June 2009; Label: Fat Cat	—	—	37	— (Note: These Four Walls did not enter the US Billboard 200, but peaked at number 27 on the Heatseekers Albums chart.)	—	—	—
In the Pit of the Stomach	Released: 4 October 2011; Label: Fat Cat	25	167	27	153	23	24	35
Unravelling	Released: 6 October 2014; Label: Fat Cat	45	—	— (Note: Unravelling did not enter the UK Independent Albums Chart, but peaked at number 17 on the UK Independent Albums Breakers Chart.)	— (Note: Unravelling did not enter the US Billboard 200, but peaked at number eight on the Heatseekers Albums chart.)	—	48	—
The More I Sleep the Less I Dream	Released: 14 September 2018; Label: Big Scary Monsters	34	— (Note: The More I Sleep the Less I Dream did not enter the UK Albums Chart, but peaked at number 36 on the UK Record Store Chart.)	— (Note: The More I Sleep the Less I Dream did not enter the UK Independent Albums Chart, but peaked at number 12 on the UK Independent Albums Breakers Chart.)	—	—	—	—
Enjoy the View	Released: 10 September 2021; Label: Big Scary Monsters	17	— (Note: Enjoy the View did not enter the UK Albums Chart, but peaked at number 62 on the UK Album Sales Chart.)	25	—	—	—	—
"—" denotes album that did not chart or was not released

=== Live albums ===
- E Rey Live in Philadelphia (February 2014)

=== EPs ===
- The Last Place You'll Look (March 2010)
- Out of Interest (June 2020)
- A Complete One-Eighty (October+December 2022)

=== Singles ===
Title	Year	Peak chart positions			Album
Title	Year	SCO	UK Phys.	UK Indie	Album
"Quiet Little Voices"	2009	21	57	9	These Four Walls
"Roll Up Your Sleeves"	2009	—	—	—	These Four Walls
"It's Thunder and It's Lightning" / "Ships With Holes Will Sink"	2009	—	—	—	These Four Walls
"It's Thunder and It's Lightning" / "Ships With Holes Will Sink"	2009	—	—	—	These Four Walls
"Medicine"	2011	—	40	—	In the Pit of the Stomach
"Human Error"	2011	—	80	—	In the Pit of the Stomach
"I Keep It Composed"	2014	—	—	—	Unravelling
"Someone Else's Problem"	2018	—	—	—	The More I Sleep the Less I Dream
"If It Happens" / "Fat Chance"	2021	—	—	—	Enjoy the View
"If It Happens" / "Fat Chance"	2021	—	—	—	Enjoy the View
"—" denotes a recording that did not chart or was not released in that territory.
