= Tapes 'n Tapes =

American indie rock band

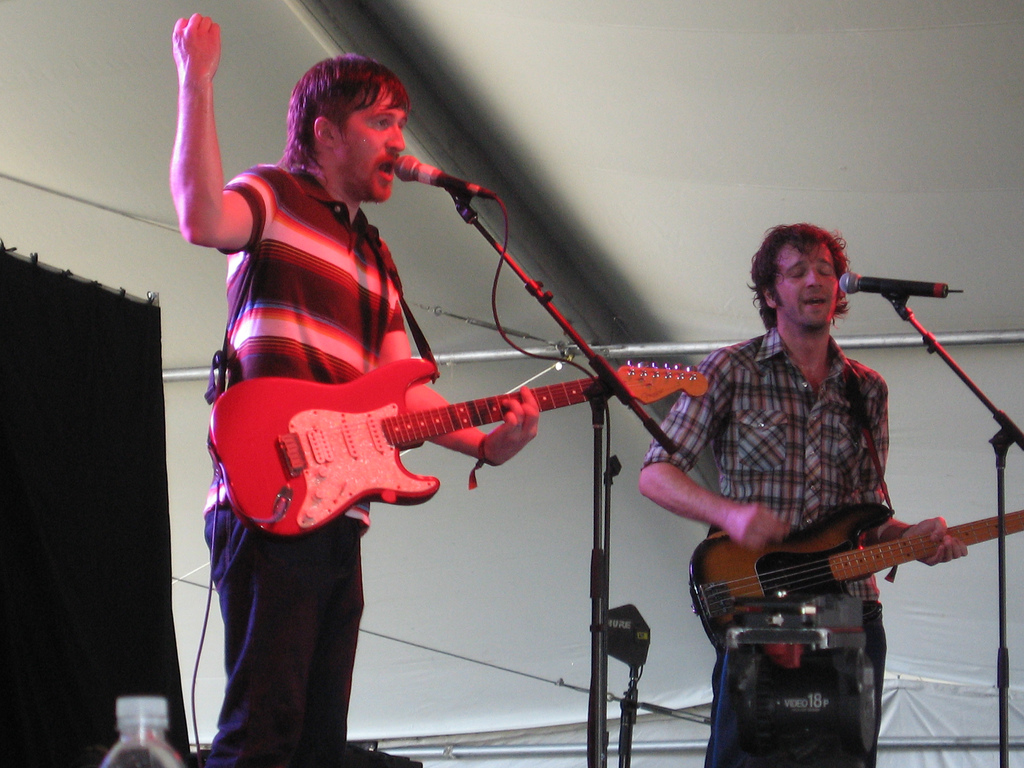
- Tapes 'n Tapes performing at the Coachella Valley Music and Arts Festival in 2007

Background information
- Origin: Minneapolis, Minnesota, United States
- Genres: Indie rock, neo-psychedelia, experimental rock, college rock
- Years active: 2003–2012, 2019–2020
- Labels: Ibid Records, XL Recordings
- Spinoff of: The Hopefuls
- Past members: Josh Grier; Jeremy Hanson; Matt Kretzman; Erik Appelwick; Shawn Neary; Karl Schweitz
- Website: tapesntapes.com

Tapes 'n Tapes was an indie rock band from Minneapolis, Minnesota. Formed in the winter of 2003 at Carleton College, the band are best known for their 2005 debut album The Loon, which featured the singles "Insistor" and "Cowbell". The band were stylistically compared to bands such as the Pixies and Pavement – and, at the time of their mid-2000s success, were compared to their then-contemporaries Clap Your Hands Say Yeah. The band released three studio albums before quietly disbanding in 2012; they briefly reunited between 2019 and 2020.

== History ==
Shortly after forming, Tapes 'n Tapes self-released a self-titled EP in 2004. After release of the EP, the band played with acts such as The Futureheads, The Streets, Metric, Calvin Johnson, and I Am the World Trade Center. Their debut album, The Loon, was released on Ibid Records in 2005. The band then signed to XL Recordings, who re-released The Loon on July 25, 2006. Tapes singer Josh Grier says their first album was recorded "...in the winter time at a cabin in the Wisconsin woods with no running water or toilet paper. It was a lot fun to do it on our own and get a little crazy, but it was also frustrating since we didn't really know entirely what we were doing."

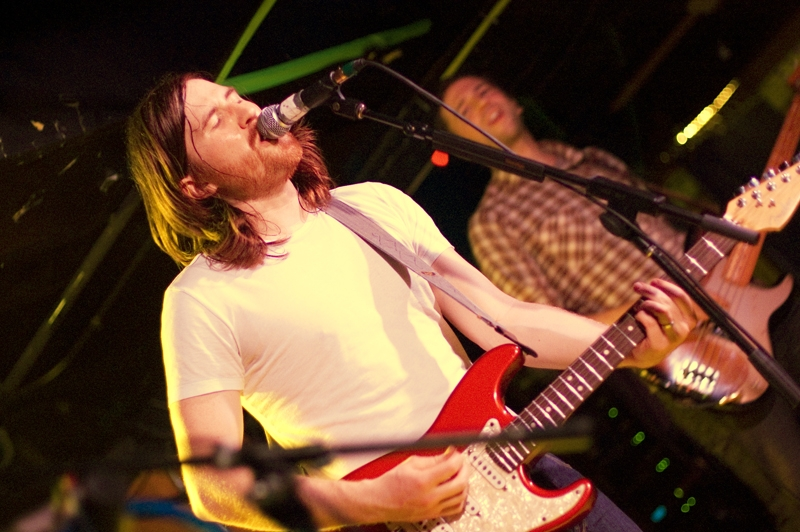
Tapes 'n Tapes performing in Columbus, Ohio on February 21, 2009

Tapes 'n Tapes first gained popularity after a series of write-ups on music blogs, first on EAR FARM then on sites such as Music For Robots and Gorilla vs. Bear, leading some to cite them as one of the earliest examples of a "blog band". However, it wasn't until The Loon received a favorable review from Pitchfork Media, including a "best new music" commendation, that the band started to find success. The band made its American television debut on The Late Show with David Letterman on July 25, 2006, performing the song "Insistor." In 2006 the band did a Take-Away Show video session shot by Vincent Moon. They also performed at the Siren Music Festival in July of that same year.

Tapes 'n Tapes performed at the Coachella Valley Music and Arts Festival in April 2007, along with bands such as Rage Against the Machine, Red Hot Chili Peppers, and Björk. During their set at the 2007 Lollapalooza festival, the band played six new songs: "Demon Apple", "Blunt", "Icedbergs", "Headshock", "Le Ruse" and "Hang Them All". "Icedbergs" was a new version of a song previously featured on the band's debut EP.

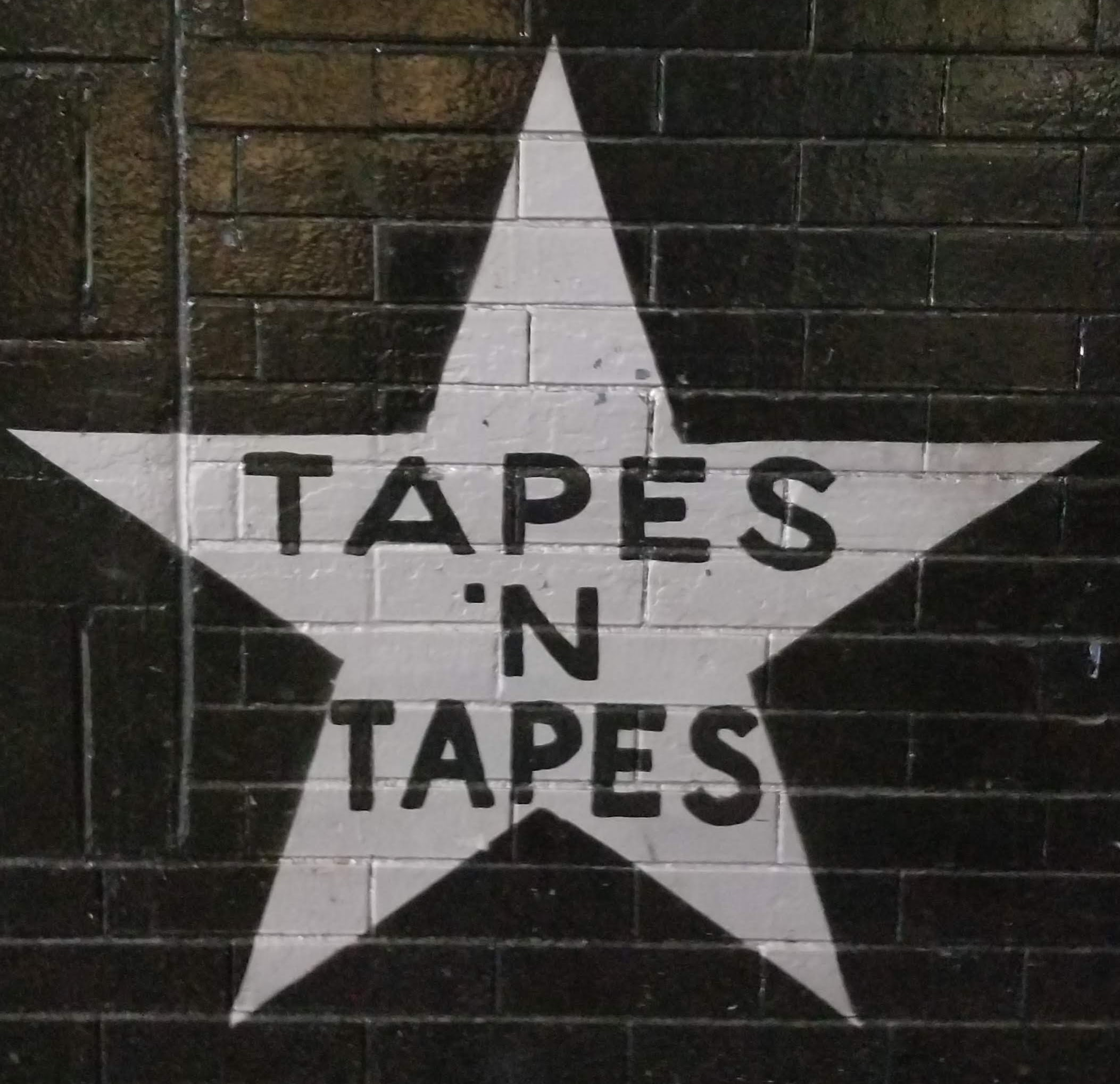
Star representing the band Tapes 'n Tapes on the outside mural of the Minneapolis nightclub First Avenue

Later in 2007, the band was featured in a sketch on the MTV comedy program Human Giant. Aziz Ansari's character, a psychotic "Indie Marketing Guru" named Clell Tickle, pushed bloggers to feature MP3s of the band on their blogs. In October, the band announced they had finishing recording their second album, titled Walk It Off. Walk It Off was recorded by producer David Fridmann at his Tarbox Road Studio in Cassadaga, New York. The album was released on April 8, 2008. Later that year, "Insistor" was featured in a scene in the film Nick and Norah's Infinite Playlist.

The band was honored with a star on the outside mural of the Minneapolis nightclub First Avenue, recognizing performers that have played sold-out shows or have otherwise demonstrated a major contribution to the culture at the venue. Receiving a star "might be the most prestigious public honor an artist can receive in Minneapolis," according to journalist Steve Marsh.

The band's final album, Outside, was released on January 11, 2011. The band toured in support of the album before quietly disbanding in 2012. They briefly reunited in 2019 to play a reunion show, but their comeback was later halted by the COVID-19 pandemic in 2020.

== Discography ==
=== Albums ===
Title	Album details	Peak chart positions				
Title	Album details	US	US Heat	US Indie	US Rock	UK
The Loon	Released: October 28, 2005; Label(s): Ibid Records (US), XL Recordings (UK)	—	—	47	—	115
Walk It Off	Released: April 2, 2008; Label(s): XL Recordings	116	1	14	—	—
Outside	Released: January 11, 2011; Label(s): Ibid Records	110	1	14	23	—
"—" denotes album that did not chart or was not released

=== EPs ===
- Tapes 'n Tapes – (2004) Ibid Records

=== Singles ===
Title	Year	Peak chart positions			Album
Title	Year	SCO	UK	UK Indie	Album
"Insistor"	2006	41	76	5	The Loon
"Cowbell"	2006	—	—	—	The Loon
"Hang Them All"	2008	62	— (Note: "Hang Them All" did not enter the UK Singles Chart, but peaked at number 79 on the UK Physical Singles Chart Top 100.)	9	Walk It Off
"Freak Out"	2010	—	—	—	Outside
"—" denotes items not released in that territory or failed to chart.

== Band members ==
Final line-up

- Josh "Tapes 1" Grier – lead vocals, guitar (2003–2012, 2019–2020)
- Matt "'n" Kretzman – keyboards, guitar, percussion, backing vocals (2003–2012, 2019–2020)
- Jeremy "Tapes 2" Hanson – drums (2005–2012, 2019–2020)
- Erik "'n" Appelwick – bass guitar, backing vocals (2006–2012, 2019–2020)

Former members

- Shawn "'n" Neary – bass guitar (2003–2006)
- Karl "Tapes 2" Schweitz – drums (2003–2005)
