= The National discography =

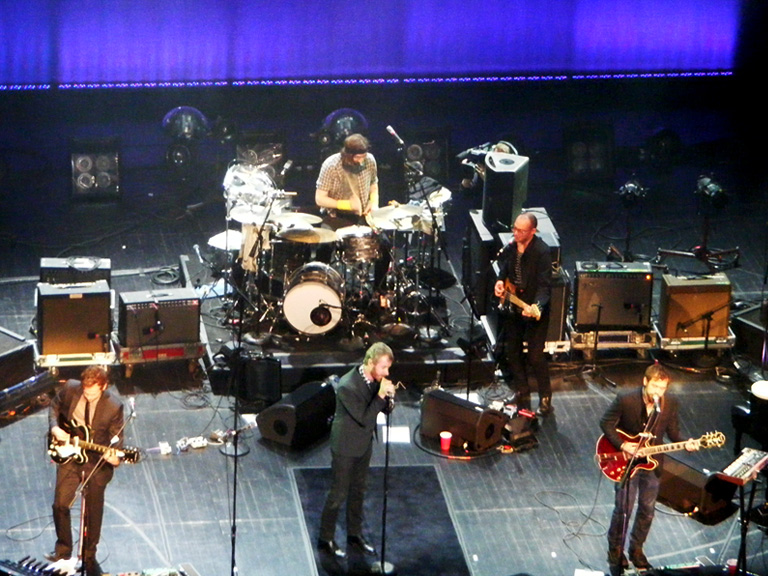
- The National performing at Brooklyn Academy of Music in 2010.
- Studio albums: 10
- Extended plays: 3
- Live albums: 5
- Singles: 24
- Music videos: 26

The discography of American indie rock band the National consists of ten studio albums, two extended plays (EPs), thirteen singles and nine music videos. The band's first two albums, were released by Brassland Records. Their next two albums were released by Beggars Banquet Records, and their subsequent albums were released by 4AD.

The documentary film, A Skin, a Night, accompanied the band's 2008 EP, The Virginia. The National's fifth studio album, High Violet (2010), reached the top ten of a dozen national charts, including peaks of number three in the United States and number five in the United Kingdom. It was certified gold in the UK, Denmark, Ireland and Belgium. The album's lead single, "Bloodbuzz Ohio", peaked at number 16 on the Belgian Ultratop chart.

== Albums ==
=== Studio albums ===
List of studio albums, with selected chart positions, sales figures and certifications
| Title | Details | Peak chart positions | | | | | | | | | | Sales | Certifications |
| Title | Details | US | AUS | BEL (FL) | CAN | FIN | IRL | NLD | NZ | SWE | UK | Sales | Certifications |
|---|---|---|---|---|---|---|---|---|---|---|---|---|---|
| The National | Released: October 30, 2001; Label: Brassland; Formats: CD | — | — | 133 | — | — | — | — | — | — | — (Note: The National did not enter the UK Albums Chart, but peaked at number 68 on the UK Physical Album Chart.) | US: 15,000 | |
| Sad Songs for Dirty Lovers | Released: September 2, 2003; Label: Brassland; Formats: CD, LP | — (Note: Sad Songs for Dirty Lovers did not enter the US Billboard 200 chart, but peaked at number 99 on the US Album Sales chart.) | — | — | — | — | — | — | — | — | — (Note: Sad Songs for Dirty Lovers did not enter the UK Albums Chart, but peaked at number 53 on the UK Physical Album Chart.) | US: 27,000 | |
| Alligator | Released: April 12, 2005; Label: Beggars Banquet; Formats: CD, LP, digital download | — | — | — | — | — | — | — | — | — | 165 | US: 77,000 | BPI: Silver |
| Boxer | Released: May 22, 2007; Label: Beggars Banquet; Formats: CD, LP, digital download | 68 | — | 32 | — | 23 | 31 | — (Note: Boxer did not enter the Dutch Album Top 100, but peaked at number 32 on the Dutch Midprice Albums chart.) | — | 53 | 57 | US: 270,000 | BPI: Gold |
| High Violet | Released: May 11, 2010; Label: 4AD; Formats: CD, LP, digital download | 3 | 29 | 3 | 2 | 9 | 3 | 23 | 5 | 5 | 5 | US: 326,846 | RIAA: Gold; BEA: Gold; BPI: Gold; IFPI DEN: Platinum; MC: Gold |
| Trouble Will Find Me | Released: May 17, 2013; Label: 4AD; Formats: CD, LP, digital download | 3 | 2 | 2 | 3 | 3 | 2 | 7 | 2 | 6 | 3 | US: 75,000 | ARIA: Gold; BPI: Gold; IFPI DEN: Gold; MC: Gold |
| Sleep Well Beast | Released: September 8, 2017; Label: 4AD; Formats: CD, LP, digital download | 2 | 2 | 2 | 1 | 3 | 1 | 3 | 2 | 2 | 1 | US: 56,000 | BPI: Silver |
| I Am Easy to Find | Released: May 17, 2019; Label: 4AD; Formats: CD, LP, digital download | 5 | 6 | 2 | 4 | 8 | 3 | 5 | 6 | 11 | 2 | | |
| First Two Pages of Frankenstein | Released: April 28, 2023; Label: 4AD; Formats: CD, LP, digital download | 14 | 9 | 1 | 16 | 15 | 1 | 1 | 4 | 18 | 4 | | |
| Laugh Track | Released: September 18, 2023; Label: 4AD; Formats: CD, LP, digital download | — (Note: Laugh Track did not enter the US Billboard 200 chart, but peaked at number 56 on the US Album Sales chart.) | 51 | 12 | — | — (Note: Laugh Track did not enter the Finnish Albums chart, but peaked at number seven on the Finnish Physical Albums chart.) | 40 | 14 | 33 | — (Note: Laugh Track did not enter the Sweden Albums chart, but peaked at number eight on the Sweden Physical Albums chart.) | 24 | | |
"—" denotes a recording that did not chart or was not released in that territory.

=== Live albums ===
| Title | Details | Peak chart positions | | | | | | | | | | Track listing |
| Title | Details | US | AUT | BEL (FL) | BEL (WA) | GER | NLD | POR | SCO | SWI | UK | Track listing |
|---|---|---|---|---|---|---|---|---|---|---|---|---|
| Daytrotter Session | Released: July 9, 2007; Label: Daytrotter; Format: Digital download | — | — | — | — | — | — | — | — | — | — | Track list: 1. "Welcome to Daytrotter"; 2. "Lucky You"; 3. "Gospel"; 4. "Slow Show"; 5. "Pretty In Pink" (The Psychedelic Furs cover) |
| iTunes Festival: London 2010 | Released: July 20, 2010; Label: 4AD; Format: Digital download | — | — | — | — | — | — | — | — | — | — | Track list: 1. "Anyone's Ghost"; 2. "Mistaken for Strangers"; 3. "Bloodbuzz Ohio"; 4. "Brainy"; 5. "Afraid of Everyone"; 6. "Conversation 16"; 7. "England"; 8. "Available" |
| Tiny Desk Concert | Released: June 10, 2013; Label: NPR; Format: Digital download | — | — | — | — | — | — | — | — | — | — | Track list: 1. "This Is the Last Time"; 2. "I Need My Girl"; 3. "Pink Rabbits"; 4. "Sea of Love" |
| A Lot of Sorrow | Released: June 30, 2015; Label: 4AD; Format: Vinyl | — | — | — | — | — | — | — | — | — | — | Track list: 1. "Sorrow" (x99) |
| Boxer (Live in Brussels) | Released: April 21, 2018; Label: 4AD; Format: Vinyl | — (Note: Boxer (Live in Brussels) did not enter the US Billboard 200 chart, but peaked at number 18 on the Vinyl Albums chart.) | — | 37 | 114 | — | 122 | 17 | 26 | — | 70 | Track list: 1. "Fake Empire"; 2. "Mistaken For Strangers"; 3. "Brainy"; 4. "Squalor Victoria"; 5. "Green Gloves"; 6. "Slow Show"; 7. "Apartment Story"; 8. "Start a War"; 9. "Guest Room"; 10. "Racing Like a Pro"; 11. "Ada"; 12. "Gospel" |
| Juicy Sonic Magic | Released: November 29, 2019; Label: 4AD; Format: Cassette | — | — | — | — | — | — | — | — | — | — | |
| Rome | Released: December 4, 2024; Label: 4AD; Format: Vinyl | — (Note: Rome did not enter the US Billboard 200 chart, but peaked at number 35 on the US Top Current Albums chart.) | 63 | 8 | 68 | 26 | 62 | — | 18 | 20 | 71 | Track list: 1. "Runaway"; 2. "Eucalyptus"; 3. "Tropic Morning News"; 4. "New Order T-Shirt"; 5. "Don't Swallow the Cap"; 6. "Bloodbuzz Ohio"; 7. "The System Only Dreams in Total Darkness"; 8. "I Need My Girl"; 9. "Lemonworld"; 10. "The Geese of Beverly Road"; 11. "Lit Up"; 12. "Alien"; 13. "Humiliation"; 14. "Murder Me Rachael"; 15. "England"; 16. "Graceless"; 17. "Fake Empire"; 18. "Smoke Detector"; 19. "Mr November"; 20. "Terrible Love"; 21. "Vanderlyle Crybaby Geeks" |
"—" denotes a recording that did not chart or was not released in that territory.

== EPs ==
List of extended plays, with selected chart positions
| Title | Details | Peak chart positions | | | | | | | | |
| Title | Details | US Sales | US Indie | BEL (FL) DVD | IRL | NLD Vinyl | SCO | SPA Vinyl | UK Sales | UK Indie |
|---|---|---|---|---|---|---|---|---|---|---|
| Cherry Tree | Released: July 20, 2004; Label: Brassland; Formats: CD, 10" vinyl | 94 | — | — | — | 18 | 30 | 59 | 51 | 21 |
| The Virginia EP | Released: May 20, 2008; Label: Beggars Banquet; Formats: CD + DVD, (Note: CD issues of The Virginia EP were packaged with a DVD of the film A Skin, A Night, directed by Vincent Moon.) 12" | — (Note: The Virginia EP did not enter the US Billboard 200 chart, but peaked at number 8 on the Vinyl Albums chart.) | 31 | 3 | 87 | — | — | — | — | 26 |
| NTL RM EP I | Released: September 23, 2024; Label: 4AD; Formats: Digital | — | — | — | — | — | — | — | — | — |
| NTL RM EP II | Released: October 23, 2024; Label: 4AD; Formats: Digital | — | — | — | — | — | — | — | — | — |
"—" denotes a recording that did not chart or was not released in that territory.

== Singles ==
=== As lead artist ===
List of singles, with selected chart positions, showing year released and album name
| Title | Year | Peak chart positions | | | | | | | | | | Certifications | Album |
| Title | Year | US Rock | BEL (FL) | CAN Rock | ICE | IRL | ITA | MEX Ing. | NZ Hot | POL | UK | Certifications | Album |
|---|---|---|---|---|---|---|---|---|---|---|---|---|---|
| "Slipping Husband" | 2003 | — | — | — | — | — | — | — | — | — | — | | Sad Songs for Dirty Lovers |
| "Abel" | 2005 | — | — | — | — | — | — | — | — | — | 83 | | Alligator |
| "Secret Meeting" | 2005 | — | — | — | — | — | — | — | — | — | — | | Alligator |
| "Lit Up" | 2005 | — | — | — | — | — | — | — | — | — | — | | Alligator |
| "Mistaken for Strangers" | 2007 | — | — | — | — | — | — | — | — | — | 183 | | Boxer |
| "Apartment Story" | 2007 | — | — | — | — | — | — | — | — | — | — | | Boxer |
| "Fake Empire" | 2008 | — | — | — | — | — | — | — | — | — | — | MC: Gold | Boxer |
| "Bloodbuzz Ohio" | 2010 | — | 16 | — | — | — | — | 20 | — | — | — (Note: "Bloodbuzz Ohio" did not enter the UK Singles Chart, but peaked at number 31 on the UK Physical Chart.) | MC: Gold | High Violet |
| "Anyone's Ghost" | 2010 | — | 48 | — | — | — | — | 24 | — | — | — | | High Violet |
| "Terrible Love" | 2010 | — | — (Note: "Terrible Love" did not enter the Flanders Ultratop 50, but peaked at number 11 on the Ultratip chart.) | — | — | 23 | 61 | — | — | — | — (Note: "Terrible Love" did not enter the UK Singles Chart, but peaked at number 38 on the UK Physical Singles Chart Top 100.) | | High Violet |
| "Wake Up Your Saints" | 2011 | — | — (Note: "Wake Up Your Saints" did not enter the Flanders Ultratop 50, but peaked at number 45 on the Ultratip chart.) | — | — | — | — | — | — | — | — | | High Violet |
| "Conversation 16" | 2011 | — | — (Note: "Conversation 16" did not enter the Flanders Ultratop 50, but peaked at number 14 on the Ultratip chart.) | — | — | — | — | — | — | — | — | | High Violet |
| "Think You Can Wait" | 2011 | — | — | — | — | — | — | — | — | — | — | | Win Win (soundtrack) |
| "Exile Vilify" | 2011 | — | — | — | — | — | — | — | — | — | — | | Non-album single |
| "Demons" | 2013 | — | — (Note: "Demons" did not enter the Flanders Ultratop 50, but peaked at number 13 on the Ultratip chart.) | — | — | 64 | — | 32 | — | 60 | — | | Trouble Will Find Me |
| "Don't Swallow the Cap" | 2013 | — (Note: "Don't Swallow the Cap" did not enter the Hot Rock & Alternative Songs chart, but peaked at number 48 on the Rock Digital Song Sales chart.) | — (Note: "Don't Swallow the Cap" did not enter the Flanders Ultratop 50, but peaked at number 7 on the Ultratip chart.) | — | — | — | — | — | — | — | — | | Trouble Will Find Me |
| "Sea of Love" | 2013 | — | — (Note: "Sea of Love" did not enter the Flanders Ultratop 50, but peaked at number 18 on the Ultratip chart.) | — | — | — | — | 40 | — | 25 | — | | Trouble Will Find Me |
| "Graceless" | 2013 | — | — (Note: "Graceless" did not enter the Flanders Ultratop 50, but peaked at number 20 on the Ultratip chart.) | — | — | — | — | — | — | 41 | — | | Trouble Will Find Me |
| "I Need My Girl" | 2014 | — | 34 | — | — | — | — | 43 | — | — | — | RIAA: Gold; BPI: Silver; MC: Platinum; RMNZ: Gold | Trouble Will Find Me |
| "Sunshine on My Back" | 2015 | — | — | — | — | — | — | — | — | — | — | | Non-album single |
| "The System Only Dreams in Total Darkness" | 2017 | 31 | — (Note: "The System Only Dreams in Total Darkness" did not enter the Flanders Ultratop 50, but peaked at number 4 on the Ultratip chart.) | 41 | — | — | — | 48 | — | 44 | — | | Sleep Well Beast |
| "Guilty Party" | 2017 | — | — | — | — | — | — | — | — | — | — | | Sleep Well Beast |
| "Carin at the Liquor Store" | 2017 | — | — (Note: "Carin at the Liquor Store" did not enter the Flanders Ultratop 50, but peaked at number 24 on the Ultratip chart.) | — | — | — | — | — | — | — | — | | Sleep Well Beast |
| "Day I Die" | 2017 | 40 | — (Note: "Day I Die" did not enter the Flanders Ultratop 50, but peaked at number three on the Ultratip chart.) | 32 | — | — | — | 28 | — | — | — | | Sleep Well Beast |
| "I'll Still Destroy You" | 2017 | — | — | — | — | — | — | — | — | — | — | | Sleep Well Beast |
| "You Had Your Soul with You" | 2019 | 48 | — (Note: "You Had Your Soul with You" did not enter the Flanders Ultratop 50, but peaked at number 17 on the Ultratip chart.) | — | — | — | — | — | — | — | — (Note: "You Had Your Soul with You" did not enter the UK Singles Chart, but peaked at number 3 on the UK Physical Chart.) | | I Am Easy to Find |
| "Light Years" | 2019 | — | — (Note: "Light Years" did not enter the Flanders Ultratop 50, but charted as an extra tip on the Flanders Ultratip chart.) | — | — | — | — | — | 31 | — | — | | I Am Easy to Find |
| "Hairpin Turns" | 2019 | — | — (Note: "Hairpin Turns" did not enter the Flanders Ultratop 50, but charted as an extra tip on the Flanders Ultratip chart.) | — | — | — | — | — | — | — | — | | I Am Easy to Find |
| "Rylan" | 2019 | 44 | — (Note: "Rylan" did not enter the Flanders Ultratop 50, but peaked at number 39 on the Ultratip chart.) | — | — | — | — | — | 40 | — | — | | I Am Easy to Find |
| "Hey Rosey" | 2019 | — | — (Note: "Hey Rosey" did not enter the Flanders Ultratop 50, but charted as an extra tip on the Flanders Ultratip chart.) | — | — | — | — | — | — | — | — | | I Am Easy to Find |
| "Never Tear Us Apart" | 2020 | — | — (Note: "Never Tear Us Apart" did not enter the Flanders Ultratop 50, but charted as an extra tip on the Flanders Ultratip chart.) | — | — | — | — | — | — | — | — | | Songs for Australia |
| "Somebody Desperate" | 2021 | — | — | — | — | — | — | — | — | — | — (Note: "Somebody Desperate" did not enter the UK Singles Chart, but peaked at number 13 on the UK Physical Chart.) | | Cyrano (soundtrack) |
| "Weird Goodbyes" (featuring Bon Iver) | 2022 | — (Note: "Weird Goodbyes" did not enter the Hot Rock & Alternative Songs chart, but peaked at number 50 on the Rock & Alternative Airplay chart.) | — | — | 27 | — | — | — | — | — | — (Note: "Weird Goodbyes" did not enter the UK Singles Chart, but peaked at number 81 on the UK Singles Sales Chart Top 100.) | | Laugh Track |
| "Tropic Morning News" | 2023 | — (Note: "Tropic Morning News" did not enter the Hot Rock & Alternative Songs chart, but peaked at number 25 on the Rock & Alternative Airplay chart.) | — | — | 38 | — | — | — | — | — | — | | First Two Pages of Frankenstein |
| "New Order T-Shirt" | 2023 | — | — | — | — | — | — | — | 39 | — | — | | First Two Pages of Frankenstein |
| "Eucalyptus" | 2023 | — | — | — | — | — | — | — | — | — | — | | First Two Pages of Frankenstein |
| "Your Mind Is Not Your Friend" (featuring Phoebe Bridgers) | 2023 | — | — | — | — | — | — | — | — | — | — | | First Two Pages of Frankenstein |
| "The Alcott" (featuring Taylor Swift) | 2023 | 13 | — | — | — | 63 | — | — | 5 | — | 90 | | First Two Pages of Frankenstein |
| "Space Invader" | 2023 | — | — | — | — | — | — | — | — | — | — | | Laugh Track |
| "Alphabet City" | 2023 | — | — | — | — | — | — | — | — | — | — | | Laugh Track |
"—" denotes a recording that did not chart or was not released in that territory.

=== As featured artist ===
| Title | Year | Peak chart positions | | | | | | | | | | Certifications | Album |
| Title | Year | US | US AAA | US Alt | US Rock | AUS | BEL (FL) Tip | CAN | POR | UK Stream | WW | Certifications | Album |
|---|---|---|---|---|---|---|---|---|---|---|---|---|---|
| "Coney Island" (Taylor Swift featuring the National) | 2020 | 63 | 18 | 12 | 12 | 42 | 8 | 31 | 150 | 75 | 45 | ARIA: Gold; BPI: Silver | Evermore |
"—" denotes a recording that did not chart or was not released in that territory.

== Other charted or certified songs ==
| Title | Year | Peak chart positions | | | | | Certifications | Album |
| Title | Year | US AAA | US Rock DL | BEL (FL) Tip | NZ Hot | POR | Certifications | Album |
|---|---|---|---|---|---|---|---|---|
| "About Today" | 2004 | — | — | — | — | — | MC: Gold | Cherry Tree |
| "Sorrow" | 2010 | — | 33 | — | — | — | | High Violet |
| "Lean" | 2013 | — | — | — | — | — | RMNZ: Gold | The Hunger Games: Catching Fire (soundtrack) |
| "Sleep Well Beast" | 2017 | — | — | — | — | 95 | | Sleep Well Beast |
| "Fake Empire" (Live in Brussels) | 2018 | — | — | 43 | — | — | | Boxer (Live in Brussels) |
| "Once Upon a Poolside" (featuring Sufjan Stevens) | 2023 | — | — | — | 30 | — | | First Two Pages of Frankenstein |
| "This Isn't Helping" (featuring Phoebe Bridgers) | 2023 | — | — | — | 33 | — | | First Two Pages of Frankenstein |
| "Crumble" (featuring Rosanne Cash) | 2023 | 28 | — | — | — | — | | Laugh Track |
"—" denotes a recording that did not chart or was not released in that territory.

== Other appearances ==
| Year | Track | Album |
|---|---|---|
| 2003 | "Clampdown" (The Clash cover) | White Riot Vol. Two (A Tribute to the Clash) |
| 2005 | "High Beams" | Music for Robots Volume 1 |
| 2006 | "Minor Star of Rome" | The Believer: 2006 Music Issue |
| 2009 | "So Far Around the Bend" | Dark Was the Night |
| 2009 | "Sleep All Summer" (with St. Vincent) (Crooked Fingers cover) | Score: 20 Years of Merge Records |
| 2009 | "Ashamed of the Story I Told" (Polaris cover) | Ciao My Shining Star: The Songs of Mark Mulcahy |
| 2011 | "Exile Vilify" | digital single (recorded for Portal 2) |
| 2011 | "Think You Can Wait" | Win Win soundtrack |
| 2011 | "Twenty Miles to NH (Part 2)" (The Philistines Jr. cover) | If a Lot of Bands Play in the Woods reissue various artists disc |
| 2011 | "About Today (alternate version)" | Warrior soundtrack |
| 2012 | "The Rains of Castamere" | Game of Thrones: Season 2 soundtrack |
| 2013 | "Lean" | The Hunger Games: Catching Fire – Original Motion Picture Soundtrack |
| 2015 | "Sunshine on My Back" | digital single (recorded for Mistaken for Strangers) |
| 2016 | "Peggy-O" | Day of the Dead (Grateful Dead cover album) |
| 2016 | "Morning Dew" | Day of the Dead (Grateful Dead cover album) |
| 2016 | "Terrapin Station" (with Daniel Rossen and Christopher Bear) | Day of the Dead (Grateful Dead cover album) |
| 2016 | "I Know You Rider" (live with Bob Weir) | Day of the Dead (Grateful Dead cover album) |
| 2017 | "Sailors in Your Mouth" | The Bob's Burgers Music Album |
| 2017 | "Christmas Magic" | The Bob's Burgers Music Album |
| 2017 | "Bad Stuff Happens in the Bathroom" (with Låpsley) | The Bob's Burgers Music Album |
| 2018 | "Le violon blanc de Monsieur Souris" | Souris Calle |
| 2019 | "Turn on Me" | For the Throne: Music Inspired by the HBO Series Game of Thrones |
| 2020 | "Never Tear Us Apart" | Songs for Australia |
| 2021 | "Somebody Desperate" | Cyrano |

== Music videos ==
| Year | Video | Directors |
|---|---|---|
| 2005 | "Abel" | Adam Levite |
| 2005 | "Lit Up" | Vincent Moon |
| 2005 | "Daughters of the Soho Riots" | Vincent Moon |
| 2007 | "Mistaken for Strangers" | Thread-Count |
| 2007 | "Apartment Story" | Banner Gwin |
| 2010 | "Bloodbuzz Ohio" | Hope Hall; Andreas Burgess; Carin Besser |
| 2010 | "Terrible Love" (Alternate Version) | Tom Berninger |
| 2010 | "Conversation 16" | Scott Jacobson |
| 2013 | "Sea of Love" | Sophia Peer |
| 2013 | "Graceless" | Sophia Peer |
| 2014 | "I Need My Girl" | Sophia Peer |
| 2016 | "Morning Dew" | Michael Brown |
| 2017 | "The System Only Dreams in Total Darkness" | Casey Reas |
| 2017 | "Guilty Party" | Casey Reas |
| 2017 | "Carin at the Liquor Store" | Casey Reas |
| 2017 | "Day I Die" | Casey Reas |
| 2017 | "I'll Still Destroy You" | Allan Sigurðsson and Ragnar Kjartansson |
| 2017 | "Dark Side of the Gym" | Justin Peck |
| 2017 | "Sleep Well Beast" | Casey Reas and Graham MacIndoe |
| 2019 | "Light Years" | Mike Mills |
| 2019 | "Hairpin Turns" | Mike Mills |
| 2019 | "Hey Rosie" | Mike Mills |
| 2023 | "Eucalyptus" | Chris Sgroi |
| 2023 | "Your Mind Is Not Your Friend" | Jackson Bridgers |
| 2023 | "Deep End (Paul's In Pieces)" | Pauline de Lassus |
| 2023 | "Dreaming" | Mina Tindle |
| 2023 | "Laugh Track" | Bernard Derriman |
