= Primavera Sound 2018 =

Music festival in Barcelona, Spain

The Primavera Sound 2018 was held on 28 May to 3 June 2018 at the Parc del Fòrum, Barcelona, Spain. The festival was preceded by the event, Primavera a la Ciutat, which was located in the downtown Barcelona.

The headliners were Björk, Nick Cave and the Bad Seeds, The National, and Arctic Monkeys.

== Lineup ==
Headline performers are listed in boldface. Artists listed from latest to earliest set times.

=== Seat ===
Thursday, 31 May	Friday, 1 June	Saturday, 2 June
Chvrches; **Björk**; Warpaint; Hinds	Tyler, the Creator; ~~Skepta~~ (Note: Skepta was due to replace Migos as they cancelled their appearance due to missing their flight to the festival. However, he also missed the performance due to airport delays.); Father John Misty; La Bien Querida	ASAP Rocky; Lorde; Jane Birkin; Christina Rosenvinge

Seat set lists
Chvrches
1. "Get Out"
2. "Bury It"
3. "Gun"
4. "Graffiti"
5. "Under the Tide"
6. "Miracle"
7. "Never Ending Circles"
8. "Forever"
9. "Recover"
10. "Leave a Trace"
11. "Clearest Blue"
12. "The Mother We Share"
13. "Never Say Die"
Björk
1. "Arisen My Senses"
2. "The Gate"
3. "Utopia"
4. "Blissing Me"
5. "Isobel"
6. "Courtship"
7. "Human Behaviour"
8. "Tabula Rasa"
9. "Pleasure Is All Mine"
10. "Wanderlust"
11. "Features Creatures"
12. "Losss"
13. "Sue Me"
14. "Notget"
Warpaint
1. "Intro"
2. "Keep It Healthy"
3. "Bees"
4. "Drive"
5. "Love Is to Die"
6. "Elephants"
7. "Billie Holiday"
8. "So Good"
9. "Undertow"
10. "New Song"
11. "Disco//Very"
Hinds
1. "Chili Town"
2. "The Club"
3. "Soberland"
4. "Caribbean Moon"
5. "Easy"
6. "Garden"
7. "Rookie"
8. "Tester"
9. "San Diego"
10. "Finally Floating"
11. "Bamboo"
12. "New For You"
Tyler, the Creator
1. "Where This Flower Blooms"
2. "Ziploc"
3. "Deathcamp"
4. "Boredom"
5. "Okra"
6. "911"
7. "Mr. Lonely"
8. "48"
9. "IFHY"
10. "Tamale"
11. "Garden Shed"
12. "Who Dat Boy"
13. "November"
14. "Glitter"
15. "I Ain't Got Time"
16. "Sometimes..."
17. "See You Again"
Father John Misty
1. "Nancy From Now On"
2. "Chateau Lobby #4 (in C for Two Virgins)"
3. "Only Son of the Ladiesman"
4. "Total Entertainment Forever"
5. "Disappointing Diamonds Are the Rarest of Them All"
6. "Mr. Tillman"
7. "Please Don't Die"
8. "Hangout at the Gallows"
9. "Pure Comedy"
10. "Hollywood Forever Cemetery Sings"
11. "I Love You, Honeybear"
12. "The Ideal Husband"
A$AP Rocky
1. "Distorted Records"
2. "ASAP Forever"
3. "Kids Turned Out Fine"
4. "LSD"
5. "Angels"
6. "Tony Tone"
7. "No Limit"
8. "Praise the Lord (Da Shine)"
9. "RAF"
10. "Fuckin' Problems"
11. "Telephone Calls"
12. "Everyday"
13. "Wild for the Night"
14. "Yamborghini High"
Lorde
1. "Sober"
2. "Homemade Dynamite"
3. "Tennis Court"
4. "Magnets"
5. "Buzzcut Season"
6. "Hard Feelings"
7. "Ribs"
8. "The Louvre"
9. "Liability"
10. "Sober II (Melodrama)"
11. "Supercut"
12. "Royals"
13. "Perfect Places"
14. "Team"
15. "Green Light"
Jane Birkin
1. "Ces petits riens"
2. "Baby Alone in Babylone"
3. "Valse de Melody"
4. "Physique et sans issue"
5. "Fuir le bonheur de peur qu'il ne se sauve"
6. "La chanson de Prévert"
7. "Manon"
8. "Les dessous chics"
9. "La gadoue"
10. "Jane B."
11. "L'anamour"
12. "La javanaise"
Christina Rosenvinge
1. "Niña animal"
2. "El pretendiente"
3. "La distancia adecuada"
4. "Romance de la plata"
5. "Ana y los pájaros"
6. "Alguien tendrá la culpa"
7. "La flor entre la vía"
8. "La muy puta"
9. "La tejedora"
10. "Afónico"

=== Mango ===
Thursday, 31 May	Friday, 1 June	Saturday, 2 June
**Nick Cave and the Bad Seeds**; The War on Drugs; (Sandy) Alex G	Haim; **The National**; The Breeders	**Arctic Monkeys**; Lykke Li; Car Seat Headrest

Mango set lists
Nick Cave and the Bad Seeds
1. "Jesus Alone"
2. "Do You Love Me?"
3. "From Her to Eternity"
4. "Loverman"
5. "Come Into My Sleep"
6. "The Ship Song"
7. "The Mercy Seat"
8. "Red Right Hand"
9. "Girl in Amber"
10. "Distant Sky"
11. "Jubilee Street"
12. "Deanna"
13. "Stagger Lee"
14. "Push the Sky Away"
The War on Drugs
1. "In Chains"
2. "Pain"
3. "An Ocean in Between the Waves"
4. "Strangest Thing"
5. "Nothing to Find"
6. "Knocked Down"
7. "Red Eyes"
8. "Under the Pressure"
9. "Eyes to the Wind"
(Sandy) Alex G
1. "Remember"
2. "Proud"
3. "People"
4. "Bobby"
5. "Soaker"
6. "Serpent is Lord"
7. "Bug"
8. "Kicker"
9. "Thorns"
10. "Poison Root"
11. "Brick"
12. "Horse"
13. "Sportstar"
14. "County"
15. "Guilty"
Haim
1. "Falling"
2. "Don't Save Me"
3. "Little of Your Love"
4. "My Song 5"
5. "Want You Back"
6. "Ready for You"
7. "Nothing's Wrong"
8. "Forever"
9. "The Wire"
10. "Right Now"
The National
1. "Nobody Else Will Be There"
2. "The System Only Dreams in Total Darkness"
3. "Don't Swallow the Cap"
4. "Walk It Back"
5. "Guilty Party"
6. "Bloodbuzz Ohio"
7. "I Need My Girl"
8. "Day I Die"
9. "Carin at the Liquor Store"
10. "Graceless"
11. "Fake Empire"
12. "Rylan"
13. "Mr. November"
14. "Terrible Love"
15. "About Today"
The Breeders
1. "New Year"
2. "Wait in the Car"
3. "All Nerve"
4. "No Aloha"
5. "Divine Hammer"
6. "Glorious"
7. "Spacewoman"
8. "Drivin' on 9"
9. "Nervous Mary"
10. "S.O.S."
11. "Off You"
12. "I Just Wanna Get Along"
13. "Cannonball"
14. "MetaGoth"
15. "Gigantic"
16. "Do You Love Me Now?"
17. "Saints"
Arctic Monkeys
1. "Four Out of Five"
2. "Brianstorm"
3. "I Bet You Look Good on the Dancefloor"
4. "Don't Sit Down 'Cause I've Moved Your Chair"
5. "Why'd You Only Call Me When You're High?"
6. "505"
7. "One Point Perspective"
8. "Do Me a Favour"
9. "Cornerstone"
10. "One for the Road"
11. "Arabella"
12. "Tranquility Base Hotel & Casino"
13. "She Looks Like Fun"
14. "Knee Socks"
15. "Pretty Visitors"
16. "Crying Lightning"
17. "Do I Wanna Know?"
18. "Batphone"
19. "The View from the Afternoon"
20. "R U Mine?"
Lykke Li
1. "Deep End"
2. "No Rest for the Wicked"
3. "Just Like a Dream"
4. "Two Nights"
5. "Hard Rain"
6. "Little Bit"
7. "Sadness Is a Blessing"
8. "I Never Learn"
9. "So Sad So Sexy"
10. "Gunshot"
11. "I Follow Rivers"
12. "Utopia"
Car Seat Headrest
1. "Crosseyed and Painless"
2. "Bodys"
3. "Fill in the Blank"
4. "(Joe Gets Kicked Out of School for Using) Drugs With Friends (But Says This Isn't a Problem)"
5. "Destroyed by Hippie Powers"
6. "Drunk Drivers/Killer Whales"
7. "Nervous Young Inhumans"

=== Primavera with Apple Music ===
Wednesday, 30 May	Thursday, 31 May	Friday, 1 June	Saturday, 2 June
Belle and Sebastian; Wolf Parade; Javiera Mena; Starcrawler; Holy Bouncer	Nils Frahm; Fever Ray; Unknown Mortal Orchestra; Sparks; Vagabon	Ty Segall and the Freedom Band; Charlotte Gainsbourg; Mogwai; Metá Metá; Waxahatchee	Beach House; Dead Cross; Slowdive; Lift to Experience; Montero

=== Ray-Ban ===
Thursday, 31 May	Friday, 1 June	Saturday, 2 June
DJ Koze; Four Tet (Live); Vince Staples; C. Tangana; Kelela; Ezra Furman; Nat Simons	The Blessed Madonna; Confidence Man; Cigarettes After Sex; Thundercat; Rhye; Oumou Sangaré; El Último Vecino	DJ Coco; The Blaze; Deerhunter; Grizzly Bear; Ariel Pink; Peter Perrett; Núria Graham

=== Pitchfork ===
Thursday, 31 May	Friday, 1 June	Saturday, 2 June
Ross from Friends; Bad Gyal; Sylvan Esso; Rostam; Mavi Phoenix; The Twilight Sad; The Zephyr Bones	DJ Python; Arca; The Internet; Ibeyi; Sevdaliza; John Maus; Marion Harper	Lindstrøm; Public Service Broadcasting; Abra; Jay Som; Tom Misch; Rex Orange County; Damed Squad

=== Adidas Originals ===
Thursday, 31 May	Friday, 1 June	Saturday, 2 June
Here Lies Man; Zeal & Ardor; Oso Leone; Anna von Hausswolff; Za!; Yonaka; F/E/A	Omni; Idles; La Banda Trapera del Rio; Shellac; Yellow Days; Cesare Basile; Doblecapa	Mujeres; Sumac; Oblivians; Watain; Rolling Blackouts Coastal Fever; Nick Hakim; Vulk

=== Auditori Rockdelux ===
Wednesday, 30 May	Thursday, 31 May
Spiritualized with Orchestra and Choir; Maria Arnal i Marcel Bagés	Echo Collective, Dustin O'Halloran and guests; Art Ensemble of Chicago; Capullo de Jerez; Delorean

=== Night Pro ===
Thursday, 31 May	Friday, 1 June	Saturday, 2 June
Populous; Client Liaison; Coals; Amaya Laucirica; Didirri; Trupa Trupa; Any Other; Kurws; O'o	Dope Calypso; Napoleon Gold; Wandl; Teischa; The Solutions; In the Endless Zanhyang We Are; 3rd Line Butterfly; Cari Cari; Alex the Astronaut	Bye Beneco; Rubio; Niños del Cerro; Como Asesinar a Felipes; Ikati Esengxoweni; Guano Padano; The Fur.; Outlet Drift

=== Heineken Hidden Stage ===
Wednesday, 30 May	Thursday, 31 May	Friday, 1 June	Saturday, 2 June
Yung Beef	Amaia & the Free Fall Band; Lee Fields & The Expressions	Ride; Josh T. Pearson	Belly; Let's Eat Grandma

=== The Warehouse ===
Thursday, 31 May (Mosaic Records showcase)	Friday, 1 June (Giegling showcase)	Saturday, 2 June (Warp showcase)
Radioactive Man; Mariel Ito; Danny Daze; Egyptian Lover; Carl Finlow; Morphology	ATEQ; DJ Dustin B2B Konstantin; Edward; Molly; Leafar Legov; ELLI; Liminal Soundbath with Jónsi, Alex Somers & Paul Corley (Note: The performance is not a part of the record label showcase.)	Evian Christ; ADR; Nkisi; Yves Tumor; Lyzza; Gaika; Tutu; Kelly Moran; Liminal Soundbath with Jónsi, Alex Somers & Paul Corley

=== Radio Primavera Sound ===
Thursday, 31 May	Friday, 1 June	Saturday, 2 June
Karrera Klub DJs; Jonathan Villicaña	Miqui Puig; Jon Hillcock	Carlo Pastore; Indiespot DJs

== Primavera a la Ciutat lineup ==
=== Sala Apolo ===
Monday, 28 May	Tuesday, 29 May	Wednesday, 30 May	Sunday, 3 June
Kelsey Lu; Ganges	The Sea and Cake; Za!	Mount Kimbie; Mavi Phoenix; Kedr Livanskiy	Dave P.; Flat Worms; Ariel Pink; Kero Kero Bonito; North State

=== La [2] de Apolo ===
Monday, 28 May	Tuesday, 29 May	Wednesday, 30 May	Sunday, 3 June
The Men	Trupa Trupa; Kurws; Coals	Willikens & Ivkovic; Umfang B2B Volvox; Shanti Celeste	Rory Phillips; Joe Goddard; Mattiel; Texxcoco

=== Barts Club ===
Wednesday, 30 May
- Populous
- Any Other
- Guano Padano

=== Day Pro ===
Wednesday, 30 May	Thursday, 31 May	Friday, 1 June	Saturday, 2 June	Sunday, 3 June
Jorra i Gomorra; Populous; North State; The Zephyr Bones; Marion Harper; Any Other; Guano Padano	Confidence Man; Client Liaison; Alex the Astronaut; Teischa; Didirri; Amaya Laucirica; Dürga; Wandl; Cari Cari	Le Boom; Fontaines D.C.; Roe; Paddy Hanna; Ailbhe Reddy; Napoleon Gold; Rubio; Como Asesinar a Felipes; Niños del Cerro	Dope Calypso; The Vibrowaves; In the Endless Zahnyang We Are; The Solutions; 3rd Line Butterfly	Bye Beneco; Ikati Esengxoweni; The Fur.; Outlet Drift

=== Barcelona ===
Sunday, 3 June
- Fermin Muguruza eta The Suicide of Western Culture
- Oblivians
- Rhye
- Waxahatchee
- Tigercats
- Olympic Flame
- The Crab Apples
- Marieta Ganduleta

=== Sala Teatre ===
Sunday, 3 June
- Jay Som
- Montero
- Puput
- Marina Herlop
- Intana
- Xavier Calvet

=== L'Auditori ===
Friday, 1 June	Saturday, 2 June
Kyle Dixon & Michael Stein performing the music of Stranger Things

== Primavera Bits lineup ==
=== Bacardí Live ===
Thursday, 31 May	Friday, 1 June	Saturday, 2 June
Carpenter Brut; Floating Points; Mount Kimbie; Jlin; James Holden & The Animal Spirits; Genius of Time; Karen Gwyer; Nightcrawler	Âme II Âme; Chromeo; Panda Bear; Mike D; Jorja Smith; Superorganism; Knox Fortune; Essaie pas; Playback Maracas	Vril; Aleksi Perälä; Jon Hopkins; Oneohtrix Point Never; Claro Intelecto; Majid Jordan; The Kite String Tangle; Gabriel Garzón-Montano; Ramzi

=== Desperados Club ===
Thursday, 31 May	Friday, 1 June	Saturday, 2 June
Marcel Dettmann; Mano Le Tough; Levon Vincent; Mall Grab; Call Super; Shanti Celeste; DJ Seinfeld; Pépe	Hunee B2B Antal; Gerd Janson; Honey Dijon; Daphni; Dekmantel Soundsystem; Peggy Gou; Seth Troxler; DJ Wey	Donato Dozzy; John Talabot; Bufiman B2B DJ Normal 4; Toulouse Low Trax; Solar; Eva Geist; Orpheu the Wizard; Alicia Carrera

=== Xiringuito Aperol ===
Thursday, 31 May (Four Tet Presents)	Friday, 1 June	Saturday, 2 June (Dekmantel Presents)
Four Tet; Daphni; Champion; Josey Rebelle	Floating Points	Palms Trax; Dekmantel Soundsystem; Palmbomen II; Orpheu the Wizard
