= Get Sunk =

Studio album by Matt Berninger
- Released: May 30, 2025
- Studio: Knobworld (Los Angeles); Firehouse 12 Studio B (New Haven); Opaque Window (Buffalo)
- Length: 43:23
- Label: Book
- Producer: Sean O'Brien

Matt Berninger chronology
Serpentine Prison (2020)	Get Sunk (2025)

Singles from Get Sunk
- 1. "Bonnet of Pins" Released: March 11, 2025; 2. "Breaking into Acting" Released: April 18, 2025; 3. "Inland Ocean" Released: May 7, 2025

Get Sunk is the second studio album by the American singer Matt Berninger, released on May 30, 2025. It was produced by Berninger's longtime collaborator Sean O'Brien, who also co-wrote most of its songs. It was released on Book Records, an imprint of Concord Records formed by Berninger and Booker T. Jones.

== Background ==
Get Sunk is the second solo album by Matt Berninger, lead singer and co-songwriter of The National. It follows his 2020 solo debut Serpentine Prison, which was produced by Booker T. Jones. Shortly after its release, Berninger entered a major depressive episode and experienced writer's block. His recovery was documented through The National's return in 2023, when they released their twin albums First Two Pages of Frankenstein and Laugh Track. That same year, Berninger moved with his wife and teenage daughter from Los Angeles to Connecticut, where he found inspiration writing lyrics and creating art pieces in his barn. The album was recorded in a basement studio in Silver Lake, California, with engineer and producer Sean O'Brien, who also co-wrote many of its songs. O'Brien previously recorded and performed on Serpentine Prison and is a frequent collaborator of The National. The sessions for Get Sunk included contributions from numerous musicians, including Meg Duffy of Hand Habits, Julia Laws of Ronboy, Kyle Resnick, Garret Lang, Sterling Laws, Booker T. Jones, Harrison Whitford, Mike Brewer, and The Walkmen's Walter Martin and Paul Maroon.

== Release and promotion ==
Get Sunk was announced March 11, 2025, alongside the release of its first single "Bonnet of Pins". A tour of North America and Europe in support of the album was also revealed. "Breaking into Acting", featuring Hand Habits, was released as the second single on April 18, 2025. A third single, "Inland Ocean", was released on May 7, 2025. The album was officially released on May 30, 2025. Berninger performed "Bonnet of Pins" on The Tonight Show Starring Jimmy Fallon on June 2, 2025.

== Critical reception ==
Professional ratings
Aggregate scores
Source	Rating
Metacritic	77/100
Review scores
Source	Rating
AllMusic	4/5 stars
DIY	4/5 stars
Dork	4/5
Mojo	4/5 stars
musicOMH	4/5 stars
Pitchfork	6.3/10
PopMatters	8/10
Record Collector	4/5 stars
Rolling Stone	3/5 stars
Uncut	8/10

At Metacritic, which assigns a normalized rating out of 100 to reviews from mainstream publications, Get Sunk received an average score of 77 based on 12 reviews, indicating "generally favorable reviews".

Minty Slater Mearns of Dork wrote, "'Get Sunk' retains the signature charm of The National while highlighting Berninger's strengths as a writer. Without big riffs or orchestral arrangements to lean on, the focus falls squarely on his lyrics, letting his storytelling take centre stage." Marcy Donelson of AllMusic commended "Berninger's incisive turns of phrase and refusal to isolate the bitter and sweet". Uncut's Bud Scoppa noted the album's "uncharacteristic moves bring an intriguing new dimension to Berninger's inward-peering persona," highlighting the tracks "Bonnet of Pins", "Nowhere Special", "Inland Ocean" and "Frozen Oranges". John Murphy of musicOMH wrote, "It may not be up there with the best of The National, but Get Sunk is definitely a new avenue for Berninger to explore. That closing choral shout of "Get sunk! Get drunk!" on the final track Times Of Difficulty feels both playful and emotional, as the best of Berninger's work can do." DIY's Joe Goggins wrote, "There is still room for what feels like his natural habitat - the wistful 'Frozen Oranges' is classic, reflective Berninger - but in the main, this is the sound of him really beginning to stretch his legs as a solo artist."

In a mixed review, Alex Robert Ross of Pitchfork wrote that Berninger embraced a more positive outlook at the expense of his "specificity and dry humor that animates his best work".

== Track listing ==
All tracks are written by Matt Berninger and Sean O'Brien, except "Little by Little" and "Times of Difficulty (written by Berninger and Mike Brewer) and "Junk" (written by Berninger and Paul Maroon).

Get Sunk track listing
No.	Title	Length
1.	"Inland Ocean"	4:54
2.	"No Love"	3:55
3.	"Bonnet of Pins"	4:47
4.	"Frozen Oranges"	4:08
5.	"Breaking into Acting" (featuring Hand Habits)	3:34
6.	"Nowhere Special"	4:58
7.	"Little by Little"	5:01
8.	"Junk"	2:54
9.	"Silver Jeep" (featuring Ronboy)	3:53
10.	"Times of Difficulty"	5:19
Total length:		43:23

== Personnel ==
Credits adapted from the album's liner notes and Tidal.

=== Musicians ===
- Matt Berninger – vocals
- Sterling Laws – percussion (all tracks), drums (1–4, 6–10), drum machine (1, 2), background vocals (10)
- Sean O'Brien – electric guitar (1, 3, 4, 6–8, 10), acoustic guitar (1, 3, 5, 7, 9, 10), organ (1, 4, 8), keyboards (2, 3, 5–7, 9), guitar loops (2, 8), guitar (3), piano (4, 5, 9), vibraphone (4, 6), steel guitar (4, 7, 8)
- Julia Laws – background vocals (1–4, 6, 7, 10), keyboards (2–4, 6, 9), vocals (9)
- Garret Lang – bass programming (1–4, 6–10), 12-string acoustic guitar (2), upright bass (5, 10), background vocals (10)
- Phil Krohnengold – keyboards (1, 8), organ (1), piano (7, 10), background vocals (10)
- Maxim Ludwig – harmonica (1), background vocals (10)
- Nick Lloyd – keyboards, piano (2)
- Kyle Resnick – trumpet (3, 4, 9), vocals (3), background vocals (9)
- Meg Duffy – electric guitar, sampler (5, 10); vocals (5)
- Harrison Whitford – acoustic guitar (7), electric guitar (8, 10), background vocals (10)
- Booker T. Jones – organ (7, 10), keyboards (8, 10), background vocals (10)
- Gabe Noel – koto, viola da gamba (8)
- Jamie Heaslip – background vocals (10)
- Marina Meshkova – background vocals (10)
- Mike Brewer – background vocals (10)

=== Technical ===
- Sean O'Brien – production, recording, mixing
- Garret Lang – additional engineering
- Nick Lloyd – additional engineering
- Kyle Resnick – additional engineering
- Peter Wells – additional engineering
- Carly Bond – engineering assistance
- Tobias Kuhn – engineering assistance
- Joe Lambert – mastering

=== Visuals ===
- Nick Veasey – photography
- Dale Doyle – package design

== Charts ==
Chart performance for Get Sunk
Chart (2025)	Peak position
Australian Vinyl Albums (ARIA)	18
Austrian Albums (Ö3 Austria)	41
Belgian Albums (Ultratop Flanders)	4
Belgian Albums (Ultratop Wallonia)	33
Croatian International Albums (HDU)	12
Dutch Albums (Album Top 100)	38
French Rock & Metal Albums (SNEP)	13
German Albums (Offizielle Top 100)	13
Swiss Albums (Schweizer Hitparade)	23
UK Albums (OCC)	27
