= Exile Vilify =

Single by the National
- Released: April 19, 2011
- Recorded: 2011
- Genre: Indie rock; ballad
- Length: 4:45
- Label: Bug Music
- Songwriter: Matt Berninger

The National singles chronology
"Conversation 16" (2011)	"Exile Vilify" (2011)	"Demons" (2013)

"Exile Vilify" is a song by indie rock band the National, written for the video game Portal 2 and released as a stand-alone single.

== Background ==
The lyrics were composed by the group and reviewed by Valve, the company who made the game, to ensure they fit with the tone of one of the Rattmann's dens, where it appears in-game. The National had expressed to Bug Music, their publishing label, an interest in doing music for Valve which the label forwarded on to Valve in discussing other music opportunities for the game. Valve and Bug Music identified that the National would fit well into Portal 2, as their "raw and emotive music evokes the same visceral reactions from its listeners that Portal does from its players" according to Bug Music's spokesperson Julia Betley.

The track was originally to be used in one of several hidden "fake endings" of the game, but was later rewritten to be more sombre and included in the game as an Easter egg.

== Critical reception ==
Paste described the song as a "haunted, piano-lead ballad" similar to the band's song "Think You Can Wait" used in the film Win Win. Exclaim! described the song as a "sombre ballad that places Matt Berninger's melancholic croon atop gloomy piano chords, lush orchestral swells and some subtle percussion".

"Exile Vilify" (alongside other Portal 2 song "Want You Gone") was nominated for "Best Song in a Game" at the 2011 Spike Video Game Awards.

== Music video ==
After the game's release, Valve and the National ran a contest encouraging users to create their own music video for "Exile Vilify", offering as prizes Valve merchandise and a guitar signed by members of the band. Of 320 videos submitted, Valve ultimately awarded two videos first prize. One video featured a sock puppet that "had nothing to do with Portal" but "managed to beautifully capture the spirit of the song", while the other provided an animated retelling of the Lab Rat comic.

== Charts ==
Chart (2011)	Peak position
UK Indie (Official Charts)	43
