= A Lot of Sorrow =

2013 artwork by Ragnar Kjartannsson

A Lot of Sorrow is a 2013 performance art piece and video installation by Ragnar Kjartannsson in collaboration with the Brooklyn-based band The National. A Lot of Sorrow is an uninterrupted concert tape of The National performing their song Sorrow in front of a live audience for six hours straight.

== Background ==
=== Ragnar Kjartansson ===
Ragnar Kjartansson was born in Reykjavik, Iceland, in 1976. He continues to live and work as an artist in Reykjavik. Kjartansson engages with many forms of media in his artworks, including paintings, drawings, video installations, and live performances. He often creates extremely repetitive and durational pieces. Some of Kjartansson's similarly durational and repetitive pieces include: The Visitors (2012), The End (2009), and God (2007).

=== The National ===
The National is an American rock band formed in 1999 in Brooklyn, New York. Originally from Cincinnati, Ohio, the band's five members include Matt Berninger (vocals), twin brothers Aaron Dessner (guitar, piano, keyboards) and Bryce Dessner (guitar, piano, keyboards), as well as brothers Scott Devendorf (bass) and Bryan Devendorf (drums). The band released their first album, The National, in 2001 and signed with Beggars Banquet Records in 2005. Between the release of their first album in 2001 and 2010, they released five more albums, including High Violet in 2010, which included the song Sorrow on its track list.

Sorrow itself is three minutes and twenty-five seconds long. It is made up of four chords, a five-note melody, and no bridge.

== Live performance ==
The live performance of A Lot of Sorrow took place on May 5, 2013, in the VW Dome at MoMA PS1, as part of its Sunday Sessions. The Sunday Sessions are a weekly presentation of live art where performance, dance, moving images, or music are exhibited. The goal of the Sunday Sessions is to showcase the unique propensity of live art for fostering distinct methods of thought and means of engaging with the larger world.

The performance began at noon in the VW Dome. For the most part, the band members wore matching black and white suits. There were about 40 to 50 people in the audience, some filtering in and out, others staying for the entirety of the performance. Aside from two moments of noticeable discrepancy in the band's performance of Sorrow, the song is played the same way, uninterrupted, for 6 hours straight. The first obvious variation occurred about halfway through the performance when Kjartansson walked onstage with refreshments for the band, consisting of coconut water, Coronas, and several pork rib sandwiches. The drummer, Devendorf, sat out of one of the renditions immediately following to finish his sandwich, producing a percussionless iteration of the song. The second break in consistency occurs in the 95th or 96th repetition of the song, at which point Berninger was overcome with emotions and had to sit out one rendition. Aside from these notable moments, there were no other obvious deviations from the original song's blueprint. According to viewers, undulations in the tone and energy from one song to the next were apparent, though less acute and intentional. At the close of the final repetition of the song, the audience claps and sings along in celebration of the accomplishment.

== Exhibitions ==
Since its creation, A Lot of Sorrow has been exhibited at a variety of museums in a wide range of locations. The video installation has been presented at The Metropolitan Museum of Art in New York City, The Farschou in Beijing, the MACM in Montreal, The Art Institute of Chicago, The Konig Galerie in Berlin, The Louisiana Museum of Modern Art in Humlebaek, Denmark, and more.

== Intention ==
According to Kjartansson, he uses extended duration in his performance art in an effort to test the limits of human attention, attempting to push individuals into new realms of consciousness and awareness. Musicologist Patrick Nickleson argues that Kjartansson's work separates itself from other durational art pieces because he does not seek to embed a sense of asceticism and disciplined monotony through repetition. In an article from the Guardian, Kjartansson is said to be more so aiming to find the humor and joy of repetition, fostering a trance-like state through his work.

According to Matt Berninger, Kjartansson developed an interest in creating a durational piece with Sorrow as the subject because he was intrigued by the depths of sadness that it reverberated. In an interview with StereoGum, Berninger said that, Kjartansson “wanted to see what happened if you kept doing it over and over again. Would it still be sad halfway through?” During the actual performance, repetition's effect on the mood of the song went through evolutions. According to the performers and audience members, there were moments of both energy and withdrawal, creating a dynamic performance despite the unimodal setlist.

== Interpretation ==
The repetition and extended durational quality has been the subject of critique and analyses by numerous academics in the fields of musicology and contemporary art. Musicologist Patrick Nickleson interprets A Lot of Sorrow's use of repetition as a means of transcending the ephemerality typical of sonorous art, becoming an environment, a so-called “sonic-sculptural space for conviviality”. This transcendent, convivial quality of A Lot of Sorrow raises the question to Nickleson of what has the ability to elicit this sculptural tangibility from a sonorous art piece. Is it just repetition? If so, how much? How often? Furthermore, Nickleson sees A Lot of Sorrow as a decoupling process of the 20th-century deleterious perception of repetition from repetition. According to Nickleson, A Lot of Sorrow critiques the use of calling something “repetitive” as a pejorative because of its unspecific and unproductive nature. A Lot of Sorrow degrades the common syntax of repetition by making the song as a whole the repetitive unit, pushing listeners to ask further questions on what makes a work repetitive. Author and Media theorist, Lutz Koepnick argues that Kjartansson's repetitive work is a rejection of linear progress, which begs viewers to reflect on how we conceptualize and what we expect of slowness.
