= High Violet =

Studio album by the National
- Released: May 10, 2010
- Recorded: March 2009 – January 2010
- Studios: Aaron's Garage (New York City); Tarquin Studios (Bridgeport)
- Genres: Indie rock; post-punk revival
- Length: 47:40
- Label: 4AD
- Producer: The National

The National chronology
The Virginia EP (2008)	High Violet (2010)	Trouble Will Find Me (2013)

Singles from High Violet
- 1. "Bloodbuzz Ohio" Released: May 3, 2010; 2. "Anyone's Ghost" Released: June 28, 2010; 3. "Conversation 16" Released: October 25, 2010; 4. "Terrible Love (Alternate Version)" Released: November 22, 2010

High Violet is the fifth studio album by the American rock band The National, released on May 10, 2010, through 4AD. The band produced the album themselves, assisted by Peter Katis with whom they worked on their previous albums Alligator and Boxer at their own studio in Brooklyn, New York, and at Katis' Tarquin Studios in Bridgeport, Connecticut. The sculpture on the album cover was created by artist Mark Fox, and is called The Binding Force.

An expanded edition of High Violet was released through 4AD on November 22, 2010. The reissue includes the standard 11-track album along with a new bonus disc, featuring the unreleased tracks "You Were a Kindness" and "Wake Up Your Saints" as well as alternate versions, B-sides, and live recordings.

== Release ==
On March 10, 2010, they performed opening track "Terrible Love" on Late Night with Jimmy Fallon, two months before the album's release.

The album's first single "Bloodbuzz Ohio" was made available for download on the band's website on March 24, 2010. The song was also released on 7" vinyl (with the exclusive B-side "Sin-Eaters") on May 3, 2010.

On April 19, 2010, a low-quality version of the album was leaked onto the internet in its entirety which prompted the band to announce that the album would be streaming on The New York Times' website from April 23 until April 27, then on NPR's website until May 11.

On May 13, 2010, the band played "Afraid of Everyone" on the Late Show with David Letterman. Sufjan Stevens sang backup for them during this performance.

High Violet sold 51,000 copies in its first week of sales, charting at number three on the Billboard 200. This marked the National's highest charting effort at the time (beating Boxer, which debuted at number 68), until the release of Sleep Well Beast in 2017, which debuted at number two.

In May 2013, the band played High Violet track "Sorrow" 105 times in a row at an art installation entitled A Lot of Sorrow, in a performance lasting six hours at MoMA PS1 in New York. This durational performance, created in collaboration with artist Ragnar Kjartannsson, was released as a special vinyl-only box set by 4AD in June 2015.

In June 2020, the expanded edition of High Violet was released on vinyl for the first time as the 10th Anniversary Expanded Edition.

== Critical reception ==
Professional ratings
Aggregate scores
Source	Rating
AnyDecentMusic?	8.3/10
Metacritic	85/100
Review scores
Source	Rating
AllMusic	3.5/5 stars
The A.V. Club	A
Entertainment Weekly	B+
The Guardian	4/5 stars
Los Angeles Times	3.5/4 stars
MSN Music (Consumer Guide)	A−
NME	8/10
Pitchfork	8.7/10
Rolling Stone	3.5/5 stars
Spin	8/10

High Violet was released to widespread critical acclaim. At Metacritic, which assigns a normalized rating out of 100 based on reviews from mainstream critics, the album received a score of 85 out of 100 based on 36 reviews, indicating "universal acclaim". BBC Music critic Mike Diver hailed the album as the National's "finest disc to date" and "a potential album of the year". Andrew Gaerig of Pitchfork wrote that "when they aim for powerful or poetic, they get there" and described High Violet as "the sound of a band taking a mandate to be a meaningful rock band seriously." Steven Hyden of The A.V. Club called the album "carefully considered without being labored" and "richly detailed without being fussy". The Guardian's Dave Simpson wrote that High Violet "is beautifully subtle" and "grows in power with each listen", and The Independent's Andy Gill called it "a masterclass in subtle emotional shading". Sputnikmusic writer Channing Freeman cited the album as the band's "third masterpiece in a row".

High Violet appeared on several publications' year-end lists of the best albums of 2010. Time named it the fourth best album of the year, and it also placed at number 15 on Rolling Stone's list of the 30 best albums of 2010. Pitchfork placed it at number 28 on their list of the 50 best albums of 2010. Exclaim! ranked High Violet at number 7 on their list of the Best Pop & Rock Albums of 2010, with critic Travis Persaud stating that it "continues the envious feat of releasing another album that's superior to its predecessor." The album placed at number eight on The Village Voice's year-end Pazz & Jop critics' poll. High Violet was awarded a Q Award for Best Album, an honor presented to the National by English musician Bernard Sumner. The album was also included in the 2011 edition of the book 1001 Albums You Must Hear Before You Die. In 2019, Pitchfork ranked the album at number 147 on their list of "The 200 Best Albums of the 2010s".

== Chart history ==
The album debuted at number three on the US Billboard and also debuted in Canada at number two, in Portugal at number three, and in Germany at number 10. High Violet was certified gold in Canada, Denmark, Belgium, and the United Kingdom. In 2011 it was awarded a diamond certification from the Independent Music Companies Association, which indicated sales of at least 200,000 copies throughout Europe. It has sold 326,846 copies in the U.S. as of September 2014.

== In popular culture ==
A number of tracks from the album have featured variously throughout popular culture.

- The track "Vanderlyle Crybaby Geeks" featured at the climax of the second season of the SyFy series Warehouse 13.
- "Vanderlyle Crybaby Geeks" was also featured in the sixth episode of the fifth and final season of Money Heist.
- The track "Runaway" was used in the 2013 film Warm Bodies and the TV show “Eastbound & Down.”
- The track "England" was used in 2018 by BBC Sport in a montage detailing England's penalty shootout victory over Colombia at the 2018 FIFA World Cup in Russia.
  - The track was also featured in the twelfth episode of the seventh season of the ABC series Grey's Anatomy.
- The expanded edition track "You Were a Kindness" featured at the climax of the Apple TV+ miniseries Defending Jacob.

== Track listing ==
Standard edition
No.	Title	Writer(s)	Length
1.	"Terrible Love"	Matt Berninger, Aaron Dessner	4:39
2.	"Sorrow"	Berninger, A. Dessner	3:25
3.	"Anyone's Ghost"	Berninger, Bryce Dessner	2:54
4.	"Little Faith"	Berninger, Carin Besser, A. Dessner	4:36
5.	"Afraid of Everyone"	Berninger, A. Dessner	4:19
6.	"Bloodbuzz Ohio"	Berninger, A. Dessner, Padma Newsome	4:36
7.	"Lemonworld"	Berninger, B. Dessner	3:23
8.	"Runaway"	Berninger, A. Dessner	5:33
9.	"Conversation 16"	Berninger, Besser, A. Dessner	4:18
10.	"England"	Berninger, A. Dessner	5:40
11.	"Vanderlyle Crybaby Geeks"	Berninger, Besser, A. Dessner	4:12

Japanese edition bonus tracks
No.	Title	Writer(s)	Length
12.	"Walk Off"	Berninger, A. Dessner	2:40
13.	"Sin-Eaters"	Berninger, A. Dessner	3:40

Expanded edition bonus disc
No.	Title	Writer(s)	Length
1.	"Terrible Love" (Alternate Version)	Berninger, A. Dessner	4:18
2.	"Wake Up Your Saints"	Berninger, A. Dessner	4:14
3.	"You Were a Kindness"	Berninger, A. Dessner	4:25
4.	"Walk Off"	Berninger, A. Dessner	2:40
5.	"Sin-Eaters"	Berninger, A. Dessner	3:39
6.	"Bloodbuzz Ohio" (Live on The Current)	Berninger, A. Dessner, Newsome	3:53
7.	"Anyone's Ghost" (Live at Brooklyn Academy of Music)	Berninger, B. Dessner	2:58
8.	"England" (Live at Brooklyn Academy of Music)	Berninger, A. Dessner	5:27

== Personnel ==
The National

- Matt Berninger
- Aaron Dessner
- Bryce Dessner
- Bryan Devendorf
- Scott Devendorf

Additional musicians

- Tim Albright – trombone
- Hideaki Aomori – clarinet, bass clarinet
- Michael Atkinson – French horn
- Thomas Bartlett – piano, keyboards
- Mads Christian Brauer – electronics and filtering
- CJ Camereri – trumpet, cornet
- Greg Chudzik – double bass
- Rachael Elliott – bassoon
- Alex Hamlin – baritone saxophone
- Marla Hansen – vocals
- Maria Jeffers – cello
- Bridget Kibbey – harp
- Thom Kozumplik – percussion
- Benjamin Lanz – trombone
- Rob Moose – violin
- Nico Muhly – celeste
- Dave Nelson – trombone
- Padma Newsome – violin, viola
- Richard Reed Parry – double bass, electric guitar, piano, vocals, backing vocal arrangements (on "Conversation 16")
- Kyle Resnick – trumpet
- Nadia Sirota – viola
- Alex Sopp – flute, bass flute
- Laurel Sprengelmeyer (Little Scream) – vocals
- Sufjan Stevens – harmonium, vocals, backing vocal arrangements (on "Afraid of Everyone")
- Jeremy Thal – French horn
- Justin Vernon – vocals
- Produced by the National
- Additional production by Aaron Dessner, Bryce Dessner, and Peter Katis
- Recorded between March 2009 and January 2010 in Aaron's garage (Brooklyn, NY) by Peter Mavrogeorgis, Brandon Reid, Aaron Dessner, and Bryce Dessner
- Additional recording at Tarquin Studios (Bridgeport, CT) by Peter Katis, and at Kampo Studios (NYC) by Patrick Dillett
- Second engineer: Greg Georgio; assisted by Keith J Nelson
- Additional vocal recording by Christian Biegai (Berlin, Germany)
- Mixed by Peter Katis
- Additional mixing by Greg Georgio
- Mastered by Greg Calbi at Sterling Sound (NYC)
- Orchestration by Bryce Dessner and Padma Newsome, except "Vanderlyle Crybaby Geeks" and "Lemonworld" by Nico Muhly
- Cover sculpture – The Binding Force by Mark Fox
- Photography by Keith Klenowski
- Design by Distant Station Ltd.

== Charts ==
=== Weekly charts ===
Weekly chart performance for High Violet
Chart (2010)	Peak position
Australian Albums (ARIA)	29
Austrian Albums (Ö3 Austria)	20
Belgian Albums (Ultratop Flanders)	3
Belgian Albums (Ultratop Wallonia)	32
Canadian Albums (Billboard)	2
Danish Albums (Hitlisten)	2
Dutch Albums (Album Top 100)	23
Finnish Albums (Suomen virallinen lista)	9
French Albums (SNEP)	29
German Albums (Offizielle Top 100)	10
Greek Albums (IFPI)	4
Irish Albums (IRMA)	3
New Zealand Albums (RMNZ)	5
Norwegian Albums (VG-lista)	12
Scottish Albums (Official Charts)	4
Spanish Albums (Promusicae)	78
Swedish Albums (Sverigetopplistan)	5
Swiss Albums (Schweizer Hitparade)	14
UK Albums (Official Charts)	5
UK Album Downloads (Official Charts)	4
UK Independent Albums (Official Charts)	1
US Billboard 200	3
US Top Rock Albums (Billboard)	1

=== Year-end charts ===
2010 Year-end chart performance for High Violet
Chart (2010)	Position
Belgian Albums (Ultratop Flanders)	25
UK Albums (OCC)	193

2011 Year-end chart performance for High Violet
Chart (2011)	Position
Belgian Albums (Ultratop Flanders)	35

== Certifications and sales ==
Certifications for and sales of High Violet
Region	Certification	Certified units/sales
Belgium (BRMA)	Gold	15,000^{*}
Canada (Music Canada)	Gold	40,000^{^}
Denmark (IFPI Danmark)	Platinum	20,000^{‡}
United Kingdom (BPI)	Gold	126,623
United States (RIAA)	Gold	500,000^{‡}
^{*} Sales figures based on certification alone.^{^} Shipments figures based on certification alone.^{‡} Sales+streaming figures based on certification alone.

== Release history ==
Release history for High Violet
Country	Date	Label	Format	Catalogue #
Various	May 10, 2010; May 11, 2010 (United States)	4AD	CD	CAD 3X03 CD
Various	May 10, 2010; May 11, 2010 (United States)	4AD	Limited CD (with foil-stamped slipcase and special poster)	CAD 3X03 CDX
Various	May 10, 2010; May 11, 2010 (United States)	4AD	2LP (standard black vinyl)	CAD 3X03
Various	May 10, 2010; May 11, 2010 (United States)	4AD	Limited 2LP (violet-coloured heavyweight vinyl)	CAD 3X03X
Japan	May 26, 2010	Beggars Japan/Hostess Entertainment	CD (two bonus tracks)	CAD 3X03 CDJ/BGJ-10082
Various	November 22, 2010	4AD	2CD expanded edition	CAD 3X49 CD
