= Trouble Will Find Me =

Studio album by the National
- Released: May 17, 2013
- Recorded: September 2012 – February 2013
- Studios: Clubhouse (Rhinebeck); Aaron's Garage (New York City); Dreamland (West Hurley); Kickstand (Los Angeles); Michelberger Hotel (Berlin)
- Genres: Indie rock; post-punk revival
- Length: 55:06
- Label: 4AD
- Producers: Aaron Dessner; Bryce Dessner

The National chronology
High Violet (2010)	Trouble Will Find Me (2013)	Sleep Well Beast (2017)

Singles from Trouble Will Find Me
- 1. "Demons" Released: April 15, 2013 (radio); 2. "Don't Swallow the Cap" Released: April 22, 2013 (radio); 3. "Graceless" Released: August 26, 2013 (radio); 4. "Sea of Love" Released: September 2, 2013 (radio); 5. "I Need My Girl" Released: February 3, 2014

Trouble Will Find Me is the sixth studio album by the American rock band the National, released on May 17, 2013, through 4AD. Produced by band members Aaron and Bryce Dessner, the album features appearances from St. Vincent, Sharon Van Etten, Doveman, Sufjan Stevens, Nona Marie Invie of Dark Dark Dark fame, and Richard Reed Parry of Arcade Fire.

The album received widespread critical acclaim upon its release. Trouble Will Find Me reached number three on both the Billboard 200 and the UK Albums Chart. The album was nominated for Best Alternative Music Album at the 56th Annual Grammy Awards.

== Background ==
The National began writing Trouble Will Find Me towards the end of the band's tour in support of previous album, High Violet (2010). Regarding the tour's completion, and the collective mental state of the band at this time, lead vocalist Matt Berninger noted, "[We] felt satisfied at the end of touring High Violet. It was the first time ever, or at least in the past ten years, where we felt like we could put the band on the shelf for a little while, put a record out in three, four years. There wasn't any sense of, 'what now?'"

Berninger, however, became inspired by guitarists Aaron and Bryce Dessner's recent demo recordings, and subsequently completed his writing contributions to the album's opening track, "I Should Live in Salt", a day after initially hearing it. Bass guitarist Scott Devendorf noted, "Our typical way of working was to send stuff to Matt, then wait a while to get some mumbles back. He seemed really motivated and engaged with the new stuff."

== Recording ==
The band began recording Trouble Will Find Me in late September 2012 at Clubhouse Recording Studios, which was modeled after the late 19th century barn-turned-inn that the band stayed in. Bass guitarist Scott Devendorf stated that Clubhouse was chosen primarily to establish camaraderie amongst the band, noting: "The impetus to record upstate-- cooking, eating, working, hanging out together - was to achieve this music-camp feel." The first four days of recording were interrupted by heavy tornado-like winds which subsequently led to a power outage. Guitarist, keyboardist and co-producer Aaron Dessner noted, "That night, by candlelight in the total darkness, we got really drunk and played the songs acoustically. It was the kind of scene that has never happened in the history of our band — and will never happen again."

The band subsequently relocated to Dreamland Recording Studios - located within a converted 19th century church, in West Hurley, New York - to record the track, "Fireproof", entirely live. Inspired by the session, the band returned to Clubhouse and recorded both "Sea of Love" and "Heavenfaced" as one-take live performances. Recording at Clubhouse, however, was once again derailed by Hurricane Sandy, with Aaron Dessner stating, "I drove back into the city because I was worried about my family and the potential flooding, and got stuck there for four days."

Dessner, who co-produced Trouble Will Find Me alongside his brother Bryce, noted that his experiences producing both Sharon Van Etten's Tramp (2012) and Local Natives' Hummingbird (2013) led him to understand the importance of "constructive, positive dialogue" in the recording studio, whereas before he and his bandmates would often argue throughout the process. While recording for Trouble Will Find Me, the song, "Rylan" was unfinished, and was later played on-and-off during their live sets. "Rylan" has since been re-recorded and made its way onto I Am Easy to Find.

== Composition ==
Inspired by the recent birth of his daughter, Ingrid Stella Dessner, guitarist, keyboardist and co-producer Aaron Dessner began writing music with his child in mind. Vocalist Matt Berninger noted that he "react[ed] to it in a very visceral, immediate, infantile way".

The lyrics to the album's opening track, "I Should Live in Salt", are directed towards Matt Berninger's brother, Tom, who directed the forthcoming band documentary, Mistaken for Strangers (2013). Berninger stated that he enjoyed the writing process for Trouble Will Find Me noting, "In the past, it's been hard to enjoy writing - like getting drops of blood from your forehead - but I loved the process for this record. I think a lot of it was because I wasn't worried - I didn't care what the songs were going to be about, or if they were going to seem depressing, or cool, or whatever."

== Artwork ==
The album cover is cropped from a photograph of a live performance art piece by Korean artist Bohyun Yoon, titled Fragmentation.

== Promotion ==
On December 8, 2011, the band performed on CBC Radio show Q in front of a live audience. Two new songs were performed for the first time: "Rylan" and "I Need My Girl". "I Need My Girl" is featured on the album. The band embarked on a tour with the Dirty Projectors to support the album. When asked about the album, Aaron Dessner, the guitarist, said "our ideas would immediately click with each other. It's free-wheeling again. The songs on one level are our most complex, and on another they're our most simple and human. It just feels like we've embraced the chemistry we have."

On April 25, 2013, the band performed album track "Sea of Love" on Late Night with Jimmy Fallon. A music video for "Sea of Love", which alludes to Russian punk rock band Zvuki Mu's music video for their 1995 single "Grubiy Zakat (Грубый Закат)", was released on the band's official YouTube account on May 8, 2013.

On April 11, 2020, the band uploaded a music video for the album closer "Hard to Find" made from rediscovered footage. The video was filmed off the coast of a nature reserve in Perth, Australia in February 2014, right before the end of the Trouble Will Find Me tour, and shows Matt Berninger swimming and playing with a group of fur seals.

=== Singles ===
"Demons" was released as the first single from Trouble Will Find Me. The song peaked at number thirteen on the Belgian Ultratip singles chart for the Flanders region and at number sixty-four on the Irish Singles Chart. Its music video, released on August 8, 2013, features a time-lapse video depicting the creation of a Trouble Will Find Me mural.

"Don't Swallow the Cap" was released to American modern rock radio on April 22 as the album's second single. The single peaked at number seven on the Flanders Ultratip chart.

"Graceless" impacted triple A radio on August 26, with the music video being posted to the band's YouTube channel on August 27 and a release to modern rock radio following on August 29. "I Need My Girl" was released to modern rock radio on January 28, 2014, as the album's fourth single.

== Reception ==
=== Critical reception ===
Professional ratings
Aggregate scores
Source	Rating
AnyDecentMusic?	8.1/10
Metacritic	84/100
Review scores
Source	Rating
AllMusic	3.5/5 stars
The A.V. Club	A−
Entertainment Weekly	B
The Guardian	5/5 stars
The Independent	5/5 stars
Los Angeles Times	2.5/4 stars
NME	8/10
Pitchfork	8.4/10
Rolling Stone	4/5 stars
Spin	7/10

Trouble Will Find Me received critical acclaim. On Metacritic, which assigns an average score out of 100 to reviews and ratings from mainstream music critics, the album received an average score of 84 based on 44 reviews, indicating "universal acclaim". Consequence of Sound's Megan Ritt wrote that Trouble Will Find Me "outlines the confidence to expand and experiment with the formula, paired with the skills to do it justice." At The Guardian, Maddy Costa concluded that "it's the subtlety, and the self-awareness, that make this album exquisite", while at The Independent, Andy Gill proclaimed that the album "will surely cement their accession to the rock mainstream". Andrew Burgess of musicOMH called Trouble Will Find Me "a collection of waves that never break" and stated that "catharsis never comes", but the album contains "glimpses of light coming through at the edges, and a sense of perfect order among the chaos." David Fricke of Rolling Stone wrote that the band "are letting light and air into their shadows".

Ian Cohen of Pitchfork called Trouble Will Find Me "both relatable and fantastical" and found it to be "their most self-referential album". At Now, Samantha Burgess wrote that "on Trouble Will Find Me, they've perfected it, knowing when a hook should explode and when to hold back and let Berninger's signature, sombre baritone take over." Paul Mardles of The Observer affirmed that The National "have perfected their ruminative rock, the beauty of their intricate arrangements ensuring the end product never sounds pedestrian", and called them "the real stars of the show." In Uncut, Louis Pattison stated the album's songs "suggest an uncertain soundtrack can still be a source of comfort" and as a result, "for the first time, The National sound relaxed in their skin." Ryan E.C. Hamm of Under the Radar called the album a "cohesive experience" and "another accomplished entry".

In American Songwriter, Jim Beviglia wrote that "progress may not be the right word", but "sustained brilliance is a pretty good alternative." James Christopher Monger of AllMusic stated that "for better or for worse, they perfected their sound the last time around, so it's hard to fault them for sticking so close to the fire." In a mixed review, Q stated that "for a band who sing so often about matters of the heart and emotional connection, much of Trouble Will Find Me sounds oddly on autopilot." Jesse Cataldo of Slant Magazine found that while the album "remains well crafted and satisfying, there's something inherently stultifying about it as well."

Trouble Will Find Me made numerous "albums of the year" lists including Pitchfork, Rolling Stone and Paste.

=== Commercial performance ===
Trouble Will Find Me debuted at number three on the US Billboard 200 with 74,722 copies sold in its first week. The album made top-ten debuts in fourteen countries other than the US. In 2014 it was awarded a double gold certification from the Independent Music Companies Association, which indicated sales of at least 150,000 copies throughout Europe.

== Track listing ==
All lyrics are written by Matt Berninger; all music is composed by The National.

Trouble Will Find Me track listing
No.	Title	Length
1.	"I Should Live in Salt"	4:08
2.	"Demons"	3:32
3.	"Don't Swallow the Cap"	4:46
4.	"Fireproof"	2:58
5.	"Sea of Love"	3:41
6.	"Heavenfaced"	4:23
7.	"This Is the Last Time"	4:43
8.	"Graceless"	4:35
9.	"Slipped"	4:25
10.	"I Need My Girl"	4:05
11.	"Humiliation"	5:01
12.	"Pink Rabbits"	4:36
13.	"Hard to Find"	4:13
Total length:		55:06

Japanese CD
No.	Title	Writer(s)	Length
14.	"Learning"	Mike Hadreas	2:59
Total length:			58:05

== Personnel ==
The National

- Matt Berninger
- Aaron Dessner
- Bryce Dessner
- Bryan Devendorf
- Scott Devendorf

Additional musicians

- Tim Albright – trombone
- Hideaki Aomori – clarinet, bass clarinet
- Mike Atkinson – French horn
- Thomas Bartlett – piano, keyboards
- Claire Bryant – cello
- Caleb Burhans – viola
- Erwan Castex a.k.a. Rone – programming, electronics
- Annie Clark – backing vocals
- Logan Coale – double bass
- Sharon Van Etten – backing vocals
- Alan Ferber – trombone
- Nona Marie Invie – backing vocals
- Benjamin Lanz – trombone, brass arrangement ("Humiliation")
- Alicia Lee – bass clarinet
- Rob Moose – violin; brass arrangements ("Slipped")
- Nico Muhly – celeste; orchestration ("Don't Swallow the Cap")
- Beth Myers – viola
- Dave Nelson – trombone
- Padma Newsome – violin, viola
- Yuki Numata – violin
- Richard Reed Parry – double bass, electric guitar, piano, harmony vocals; orchestration ("Hard to Find")
- Kyle Resnick – trumpet, backing vocals
- Ben Russell – violin
- Caroline Shaw – violin
- Nadia Sirota – viola
- Brian Snow – cello
- Alex Sopp – flute
- Sufjan Stevens – piano, synths, drum machine
- Jeremy Turner – cello

Recording personnel

- Aaron Dessner – producer, additional recording
- Bryce Dessner – producer, additional recording, orchestration
- Marcus Paquin – associate producer, recording, mixing ("This Is the Last Time")
- Jonathan Low – recording
- Bella Blasko – recording assistant
- Nick Lloyd – additional recording
- Martyn Heyne – additional recording
- Craig Silvey – mixing (all except "Sea of Love")
- Peter Katis – mixing ("Sea of Love")
- Eduardo de la Paz Canel – mixing assistant
- John Horne – mixing assistant
- Greg Giorgio – mixing assistant ("Sea of Love")
- Greg Calbi – mastering

Artwork

- Bohyun Yoon – cover art (Fragmentation)
- Dale Frank – interior panel (He had not been alone at home for over four months, maybe five...)
- Casey Reas – interior spread (Signal to Noise (Software 1))
- Scott Devendorf – booklet covers (July 4th, Barryville, New York)
- Doug Bennett – "I Should Live In Salt" artwork (Untitled)
- Clara Claus – "Demons" artwork (Filament)
- John Solimine – "Don't Swallow the Cap" artwork (Gary Six)
- Nancy Berninger – "Fireproof" artwork (Nancy - Self)
- Charles Wilkin – "Sea of Love" artwork (Untitled (Snow Caps))
- Karl Jensen – "Heavenfaced" artwork (Study for White Sulpher Springs)
- Jessie Henson – "This Is the Last Time" artwork (Time Before, Time After)
- Jeff Salem – "Graceless" artwork (Self Portrait 3)
- Jeff Tyson – "Slipped" artwork (Untitled)
- Randall J Lane – "I Need My Girl" artwork (Ballads)
- Jessica Dessner – "Humiliation" artwork (Untitled)
- Megan Craig – "Pink Rabbits" artwork (How Blue)
- Justin Davis Anderson – "Hard to Find" artwork (David)
- Lafont London – design
- Distant Station Ltd. – design

== Charts ==
=== Weekly charts ===
Weekly chart performance for Trouble Will Find Me
Chart (2013)	Peak position
Australian Albums (ARIA)	2
Austrian Albums (Ö3 Austria)	7
Belgian Albums (Ultratop Flanders)	2
Belgian Albums (Ultratop Wallonia)	13
Canadian Albums (Billboard)	3
Danish Albums (Hitlisten)	3
Dutch Albums (Album Top 100)	7
Finnish Albums (Suomen virallinen lista)	3
French Albums (SNEP)	52
German Albums (Offizielle Top 100)	11
Greek Albums (IFPI)	32
Irish Albums (IRMA)	2
Irish Independent Albums Chart	1
Italian Albums (FIMI)	21
New Zealand Albums (RMNZ)	2
Norwegian Albums (VG-lista)	2
Portuguese Albums (AFP)	2
Scottish Albums (Official Charts)	4
Spanish Albums (Promusicae)	14
Swedish Albums (Sverigetopplistan)	6
Swiss Albums (Schweizer Hitparade)	6
UK Albums (Official Charts)	3
UK Indie Albums (OCC)	1
US Billboard 200	3
US Independent Albums (Billboard)	1
US Top Rock Albums (Billboard)	1

=== Year-end charts ===
2013 year-end chart performance for Trouble Will Find Me
Chart (2013)	Position
Belgian Albums (Ultratop Flanders)	22
Belgian Albums (Ultratop Wallonia)	146
UK Albums (OCC)	151
US Billboard 200	155
US Top Rock Albums (Billboard)	40

2014 year-end chart performance for Trouble Will Find Me
Chart (2014)	Position
Belgian Albums (Ultratop Flanders)	53

== Certifications ==
Certifications for Trouble Will Find Me
Region	Certification	Certified units/sales
Australia (ARIA)	Gold	35,000^{^}
Canada (Music Canada)	Gold	40,000^{^}
Denmark (IFPI Danmark)	Gold	10,000^{‡}
United Kingdom (BPI)	Gold	100,000^{‡}
^{^} Shipments figures based on certification alone.^{‡} Sales+streaming figures based on certification alone.

== Release history ==
Release history for Trouble Will Find Me
Region	Date	Format	Label
Australia	May 17, 2013	Digital download, CD, LP	4AD
Germany	May 17, 2013	Digital download, CD, LP	4AD
Ireland	May 17, 2013	Digital download, CD, LP	4AD
United Kingdom	May 20, 2013	Digital download, CD, LP	4AD
France	May 20, 2013	Digital download, CD, LP	4AD
Canada	May 21, 2013	Digital download, CD, LP	4AD
United States	May 21, 2013	Digital download, CD, LP	4AD
Japan	May 22, 2013	Digital download, CD, LP	4AD

== Cover versions ==
The Tallest Man on Earth recorded a version of "Pink Rabbits" for his 2022 album of cover songs, Too Late for Edelweiss.
