= Sea of Love (The National song) =

Single by The National

from the album Trouble Will Find Me
- Released: September 2, 2013
- Recorded: 2012–13
- Studio: Michelberger Hotel (Berlin)
- Genre: Indie rock
- Length: 3:41
- Label: 4AD
- Composers: Matt Berninger; Aaron Dessner; Bryce Dessner; Bryan Devendorf; Scott Devendorf
- Lyricist: Matt Berlinger
- Producers: Aaron Dessner; Bryce Dessner

The National singles chronology
"Graceless" (2013)	"Sea of Love" (2013)	"I Need My Girl" (2014)

"Sea of Love" is a song by American indie rock band The National. Written by band members Matt Berninger and Aaron Dessner, it appears as the fifth track on the band's sixth studio album Trouble Will Find Me. "Sea of Love" was released as the album's fourth single on September 2, 2013. The music video for the song, which preceded its release as a radio single, debuted on May 8, 2013 and parodies Russian Zvuki Mu's video for their "Grubyj Zakat" song.

== Personnel ==
Credits adapted from Song Exploder.

The National

- Matt Berninger – lead vocals
- Aaron Dessner – guitar, harmonica
- Bryce Dessner – guitar
- Bryan Devendorf – drums
- Scott Devendorf – bass guitar

Additional musician

- Richard Reed Parry – harmony vocals

== Charts ==
Chart (2013)	Peak position
Belgium (Ultratip Bubbling Under Flanders)	18

== Release history ==
Region	Date	Format	Label
United States	September 2, 2013	Adult album alternative radio	4AD; Beggars Group
