= Of the Sun =

Studio album by Trupa Trupa
- Released: 13 September 2019
- Length: 42:30
- Labels: Glitterbeat (Europe); Lovitt (USA)

Trupa Trupa chronology
Jolly New Songs (2017)	Of the Sun (2019)

Professional ratings
Aggregate scores
Source	Rating
Metacritic	81/100
Review scores
Source	Rating
Chicago Tribune	3.5/5 stars
Clash	7/10
The Line of Best Fit	8/10
Paste	7.6/10

Of the Sun is the fifth studio album by Polish band Trupa Trupa. It was released on 13 September 2019 under Giltterbeat Records.

The album focuses on the issues that Europe faces, including populism and the holocaust.

== Critical reception ==
Of the Sun was met with universal acclaim reviews from critics. At Metacritic, which assigns a weighted average rating out of 100 to reviews from mainstream publications, this release received an average score of 81, based on 7 reviews.

== Track listing ==
No.	Title	Length
1.	"Dream About"	3:43
2.	"Mangle"	3:00
3.	"Another Day"	4:16
4.	"Angle"	2:18
5.	"Longing"	4:23
6.	"Remainder"	3:02
7.	"Anyhow"	2:24
8.	"Long Time Ago"	2:51
9.	"Of the Sun"	4:53
10.	"Glory"	3:04
11.	"Turn"	1:53
12.	"Satellite"	6:43
