= Serpentine Prison =

Studio album by Matt Berninger
- Released: October 16, 2020
- Studios: Earthstar Creation Center (Venice, California); Knobworld (Los Angeles, CA); Silent Partner (Philadelphia, PA); Cecelia's (Brooklyn, NY); Long Pond (Hudson Valley, NY)
- Length: 41:33
- Label: Book Records
- Producer: Booker T. Jones

Matt Berninger chronology
| Serpentine Prison (2020) | Get Sunk (2025) |

Singles from Serpentine Prison
- 1. "Serpentine Prison" Released: May 20, 2020; 2. "Distant Axis" Released: July 17, 2020; 3. "One More Second" Released: September 10, 2020

Serpentine Prison is the debut solo studio album by Matt Berninger, lead singer and co-songwriter of The National, released on October 16, 2020. It was produced by Booker T. Jones and released on Book Records, a new imprint of Concord Records formed by Berninger and Jones.

Serpentine Prison was nominated for Best Recording Package at the 64th Annual Grammy Awards. The album was designed and art directed by Dale Doyle at Holotype, and painted by Michael Carson.

== Background and recording ==
Berninger initially planned to release a covers album. Inspired by Willie Nelson's 1978 covers album Stardust, which was produced by Booker T. Jones, Berninger contacted Jones for assistance in making his own covers album. Berninger provided Jones with demos of covers and original songs, and eventually decided on an originals album. Four of the covers they recorded were released on the album's deluxe edition.

Serpentine Prison was recorded at Earthstar Creation Center in Venice, California. Additional recording was completed at Knobworld in Los Angeles; Silent Partner in Philadelphia; Cecelia's in Brooklyn; and Long Pond in the Hudson Valley, New York. The album is dedicated to Berninger's grandmother Elaine and to his college professor Gordon Salchow.

== Release and promotion ==
Serpentine Prison was first announced by Berninger on Instagram on October 18, 2019, the day after he released his song "Walking on a String" featuring Phoebe Bridgers. The album was officially announced on May 20, 2020, with a scheduled release date for October 2, 2020. The album's title track was released the same day as a single. "Distant Axis" was released as a single on July 17, 2020. A third single, "One More Second", was released on September 10, 2020. The album's release date was pushed back to October 16, 2020. Berninger performed "One More Second" on The Late Show with Stephen Colbert on October 22, 2020.

A deluxe edition of the album, featuring four cover versions and two new original songs, was released digitally on March 12, 2021. The bonus tracks were previously only available on the limited-edition double vinyl issue of the album, which was released the same day as the standard edition. The four covers include The Velvet Underground's "European Son", Bettye Swann's "Then You Can Tell Me Goodbye", Morphine's "In Spite of Me", and Eddie Floyd's "Big Bird".

== Critical reception ==
Professional ratings
Aggregate scores
| Source | Rating |
|---|---|
| AnyDecentMusic? | 7.4/10 |
| Metacritic | 77/100 |
Review scores
| Source | Rating |
| AllMusic | 3.5/5 stars |
| Consequence of Sound | B |
| Exclaim! | 7/10 |
| The Independent | 4/5 stars |
| The Irish Times | 5/5 stars |
| NME | 4/5 stars |
| Paste | 8.7/10 |
| Pitchfork | 6.7/10 |
| Record Collector | 5/5 stars |
| Rolling Stone | 3/5 stars |

At Metacritic, which assigns a normalized rating out of 100 to reviews from mainstream critics, Serpentine Prison received an average score of 77 based on 20 reviews, indicating "generally favorable reviews". Candace McDuffie of Paste wrote, "Serpentine Prison displays infinite promise from an artist who has already given us a catalogue that has made a lasting impact on rock music as we know it."

== Track listing ==
Serpentine Prison – Standard edition
| No. | Title | Writer(s) | Length |
|---|---|---|---|
| 1. | "My Eyes Are T-Shirts" | Matt Berninger; Scott Devendorf | 2:40 |
| 2. | "Distant Axis" | Berninger; Walter Martin | 4:25 |
| 3. | "One More Second" | Berninger; Matt Sheehy | 5:22 |
| 4. | "Loved So Little" | Berninger; Mike Brewer | 4:55 |
| 5. | "Silver Springs" (featuring Gail Ann Dorsey) | Berninger; Sean O'Brien; Harrison Whitford | 3:53 |
| 6. | "Oh Dearie" | Berninger; O'Brien; Whitford | 3:16 |
| 7. | "Take Me Out of Town" | Berninger; Hayden Desser | 4:11 |
| 8. | "Collar of Your Shirt" | Berninger; Martin | 5:14 |
| 9. | "All for Nothing" | Berninger; Brent Knopf | 3:05 |
| 10. | "Serpentine Prison" | Berninger; O'Brien; Whitford | 4:32 |
| Total length: | | | 41:33 |

Serpentine Prison – Deluxe edition (bonus tracks)
| No. | Title | Writer(s) | Length |
|---|---|---|---|
| 11. | "European Son" | John Cale; Sterling Morrison; Lou Reed; Maureen Tucker | 5:26 |
| 12. | "Then You Can Tell Me Goodbye" | John D. Loudermilk | 3:27 |
| 13. | "In Spite of Me" | Mark Sandman | 2:20 |
| 14. | "Big Bird" | Eddie Floyd; Booker T. Jones | 3:15 |
| 15. | "Let It Be" | Berninger; Brewer | 3:42 |
| 16. | "The End" | Ben Lanz | 4:26 |
| Total length: | | | 64:09 |

== Personnel ==
Credits adapted from the album's liner notes.

Musicians

- Matt Berninger – vocals (all tracks), lyrics, melodies
- Booker T. Jones – Hammond B3 organ (tracks 1, 3–16), piano (tracks 2, 5, 6, 11, 12), electric piano (track 4), backing vocals (tracks 4, 11, 12, 14), bass (track 6), OP-1 synthesizer (track 11), electric guitar (tracks 13, 14)
- Scott Devendorf – bass (tracks 1, 3)
- Harrison Whitford – electric guitar (tracks 1, 3, 5, 8, 11, 14), lap steel guitar (track 1), acoustic guitar (tracks 2, 3, 6–10, 12, 13, 16), slide guitar (tracks 4, 9), bass (tracks 4, 5, 6, 10, 15)
- Andrew Bird – violin (tracks 2, 4, 6, 8, 9), loops (track 2), backing vocals (track 2)
- Sean O'Brien – lap steel guitar (tracks 2, 4, 7, 11, 14, 16), acoustic guitar (tracks 5, 6, 7, 10, 13, 15), gang vocals (track 9)
- Walter Martin – electric guitar (tracks 2, 4, 8, 11, 15), bass (tracks 2, 12), synthesizer (track 2), percussion (track 2), backing vocals (track 2)
- Hayden Desser – piano (tracks 1, 7), acoustic guitar (track 1)
- Matt Barrick – drums (all tracks), percussion (tracks 1–11, 13–16)
- Gail Ann Dorsey – lead vocals (track 5), backing vocals (tracks 3, 4, 6, 11–16), bass (track 1)
- Kyle Resnick – trumpet (tracks 4, 5, 7, 9–11, 14–16), backing vocals (tracks 6, 15)
- Jamie Heaslip – gang vocals (track 9)
- Mike Brewer – acoustic guitar (tracks 4, 15), bass (tracks 8, 11, 14, 16)
- Brent Knopf – piano (tracks 3, 9), guitars (track 9), synthesizer (track 9), backing vocals (track 9)
- Matt Sheehy – acoustic guitar (track 3), bass (track 9)
- Mickey Raphael – harmonica (tracks 4, 5, 9–11, 14–16), bass harmonica (track 6)
- Ben Lanz – trombone (tracks 4, 5, 7, 9–11, 14–16), bass (track 7), piano (track 16)
- Teddy Jones – electric guitar (tracks 13, 14)

Production

- Booker T. Jones – production (all tracks), arrangement (all tracks)
- Sean O'Brien – recording (all tracks), mixing (all tracks), additional production (all tracks)
- Matt Barrick – additional engineering
- Bella Blasko – additional engineering
- Walter Martin – additional engineering
- John X Volaitis – additional engineering

Art

- Dale Doyle – album design
- Michael Carson – artwork
- Chris Sgroi – photography
- Tom Berninger – photography

== Charts ==
=== Weekly charts ===
Weekly chart performance for Serpentine Prison
| Chart (2020) | Peak position |
|---|---|
| Australian Albums (ARIA) | 32 |
| Austrian Albums (Ö3 Austria) | 20 |
| Belgian Albums (Ultratop Flanders) | 1 |
| Belgian Albums (Ultratop Wallonia) | 20 |
| Dutch Albums (Album Top 100) | 18 |
| French Albums (SNEP) | 82 |
| German Albums (Offizielle Top 100) | 19 |
| Italian Albums (FIMI) | 70 |
| Portuguese Albums (AFP) | 1 |
| Scottish Albums (Official Charts) | 10 |
| Spanish Albums (PROMUSICAE) | 29 |
| Swiss Albums (Schweizer Hitparade) | 25 |
| UK Albums (Official Charts) | 21 |
| US Billboard 200 | 161 |
| US Top Rock Albums (Billboard) | 21 |

=== Year-end charts ===
Year-end chart performance for Serpentine Prison
| Chart (2020) | Position |
|---|---|
| Belgian Albums (Ultratop Flanders) | 125 |
