= Demons (The National song) =

Single by The National

from the album Trouble Will Find Me
- Released: April 15, 2013
- Recorded: 2012–13
- Genre: Indie rock
- Length: 3:31
- Label: 4AD
- Songwriters: Matt Berninger; Aaron Dessner
- Producers: Aaron Dessner; Bryce Dessner

The National singles chronology
"Exile Vilify" (2011)	"Demons" (2013)	"Don't Swallow the Cap" (2013)

"Demons" is a song by American indie rock band The National. Written by band members Matt Berninger and Aaron Dessner, it appears as the second track on the band's sixth studio album Trouble Will Find Me and was released as the album's first single on April 15, 2013.

== Charts ==
Weekly chart performance for "Demons"
Chart (2013)	Peak position
Belgium (Ultratip Bubbling Under Flanders)	13
Ireland (IRMA)	64
Mexico Ingles Airplay (Billboard)	32
UK Indie (Official Charts)	49

== Release history ==
Region	Date	Format	Label
Europe	April 15, 2013	Contemporary hit radio	4AD; V2 Records
United Kingdom	May 20, 2013	Contemporary hit radio	4AD
