= Nick Veasey =

British photographer

- Born: 1962 (age 63–64); London
- Known for: Photography
- Website: nickveasey.com

Boeing 777 image created by Veasey

Nick Veasey is a British photographer working primarily with images created from X-ray imaging. Some of his works are partial photomanipulations with Photoshop. He therefore works with digital artists to realise his creations.

Born in London in 1962, he worked in the advertising and design industries and pursued work in conventional still photography before being asked to X-ray a cola can for a television show. Veasey also X-rayed the shoes he was wearing on the day and upon showing the finished image to an art director was galvanised by the response it provoked.

He lives near Maidstone, England. His work has featured in many international advertising campaigns and adorned products and packaging worldwide, notably Adobe's Creative Suite livery and Lenor/Downy fabric conditioner.

In 2009, a major exhibition of his works began at Maddox Fine Arts in Mayfair, London. Artworks are also exhibited in galleries internationally, with exhibitions running in 2018 in Europe, North America and Asia.

Veasey's first collection of images collated into hardback format: X-ray: See Through The World Around You was released by Carlton/Goodman in the UK and Penguin in North America. The book collects images captured over a 13-year period of experimentation with X-ray imaging and equipment.

He is the recipient of many photographic and design awards including IPA Lucie Awards, AOP, Graphis, Communication Arts, Applied Arts, PX3 and awards from the D&AD also being nominated for the IPA Lucie International Photographer of the Year 2008. He claims to be responsible for realising the possibly largest X-ray to date, a life size Boeing 777 jet, which currently resides upon a hangar at Logan Airport, Boston. The image was largely debunked as an authentic X-ray in 2009.
