= Bug Music =

- Industry: Music publishing
- Founded: 1975; 51 years ago
- Founder: Dan Bourgoise
- Defunct: 2011
- Fate: Merged into BMG Rights Management

Bug Music was an influential independent music publisher in Los Angeles, California. The company was founded in 1975 by Dan Bourgoise to represent the catalogue of musician Del Shannon.

Their clients included Johnny Cash and Rosanne Cash, Los Lobos, Iggy Pop and The Stooges, Del Shannon, Three 6 Mafia, John Lee Hooker, Muddy Waters, Woody Guthrie, John Prine, and Richard Thompson. Widely regarded as a major contributor to the evolution of Los Angeles and independent music, the firm's catalog included songs across genres as diverse as blues, punk, Americana, roots music, rockabilly, folk, country, and alternative rock, as well as hip-hop, electronic, and Latin rock.

In 1978 and 1979 it was represented in the UK by Bob Newby's Music & Entertainment Management Organisation, protecting their Copyrights and handling Royalty collection.

In 2007, Bug acquired Windswept Music from Fujipacific, adding 250,000 songs to its catalogue. In 2010, the company acquired the Saban Music Group catalog, including the rights to themes and background music for shows such as Mighty Morphin Power Rangers and the English dub of Digimon.

Bug Music was acquired by and absorbed into BMG Rights Management in 2011.
