= Don't Swallow the Cap =

Single by The National

from the album Trouble Will Find Me
- Released: April 22, 2013
- Recorded: 2012–13
- Genre: Indie rock
- Length: 4:46
- Label: 4AD
- Songwriters: Matt Berninger; Aaron Dessner; Bryce Dessner
- Producers: Aaron Dessner; Bryce Dessner

The National singles chronology
"Demons" (2013)	"Don't Swallow the Cap" (2013)	"Graceless" (2013)

"Don't Swallow the Cap" is a song by American indie rock band The National. Written by band members Matt Berninger, Aaron Dessner, and Bryce Dessner, it appears as the third track on the band's sixth studio album Trouble Will Find Me. "Don't Swallow the Cap" was released to United States modern rock radio as the album's second overall single on April 22, 2013.

== Charts ==
Chart (2013)	Peak position
Belgium (Ultratip Bubbling Under Flanders)	7
US Rock Digital Songs (Billboard)	48

== Release history ==
Region	Date	Format	Label
United States	April 22, 2013	Adult album alternative radio	4AD; Beggars Group
United States	April 23, 2013	Modern rock radio	4AD; Beggars Group
Europe	May 13, 2013	Contemporary hit radio	4AD; V2 Records
