= Trupa Trupa =

Polish indie rock band

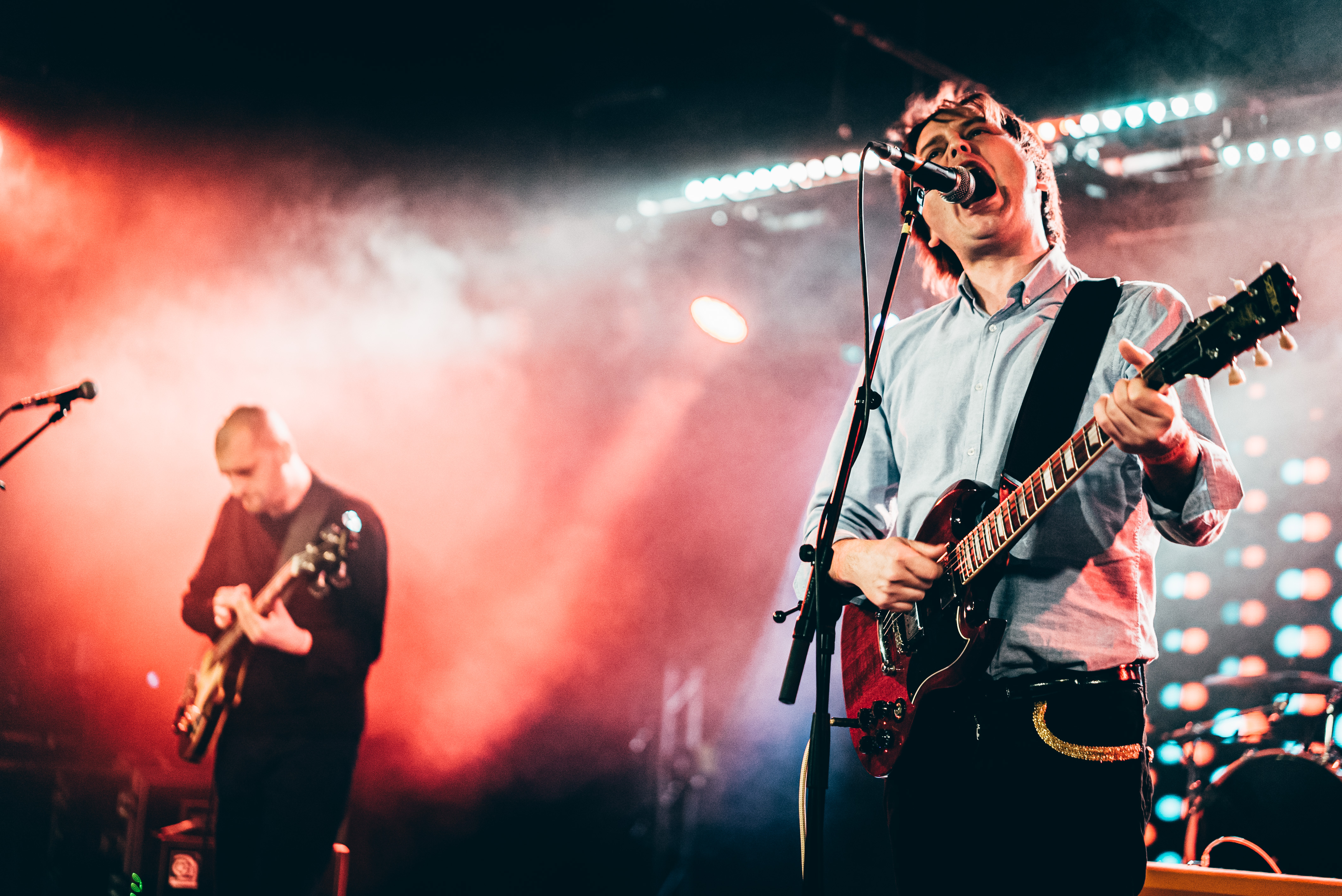

Background information
- Origin: Gdańsk, Poland
- Genre: Indie rock
- Years active: 2009–present
- Labels: Blue Tapes, Ici d'ailleurs, Lovitt, Moorworks, Antena Krzyku, Glitterbeat, Sub Pop
- Members: Grzegorz Kwiatkowski; Wojtek Juchniewicz; Tomek Pawluczuk
- Past members: Rafał Wojczal
- Website: www.trupatrupa.com

Trupa Trupa are a Polish indie rock band formed in Gdańsk in 2009. After several self-released records, they have since released three albums internationally.

== History ==
The band, comprising Grzegorz Kwiatkowski (vocals, guitar, also a published poet), Wojtek Juchniewicz (vocals, guitar), and Tomek Pawluczuk (drums), formed in Gdańsk, where Juchniewicz and Pawluczuk studied at the Academy of Fine Arts and Kwiatkowski studied philosophy at university. The name Trupa Trupa translates roughly into English as "a troupe of corpses".

The band self-released an EP and two albums, including ++ (2013), which was recorded in the New Synagogue in Wrzeszcz, gave the band their second 'Storm of the Year' award from the newspaper Gazeta Wyborcza (the first was for debut album LP), and led to their signing to the British label Blue Tapes label run by David McNamee. They worked with producer Michał Kupicz on the 2015 album Headache, which was nominated for the Polish equivalent of the Mercury Prize. They also signed for French label Ici d'ailleurs in 2016, who released a remastered version of Headache. The album is sung entirely in English. Jérôme Provençal, writing for Les Inrockuptibles, called it "a masterful album that provides maximum pleasure".

In 2017, Blue Tapes released Jolly New Songs, which includes the song "Never Forget", which deals with the actions of the Nazis in Poland, Kwiatkowski's grandfather having been a prisoner in the Stutthof concentration camp. The album received a 6.7 score from Pitchfork, with Evan Rytlewski saying the album "blurs the lines between the wry and the genuinely unsettling so effectively that it’s rarely entirely clear when, or if, the band is joking". Richard Foster for The Quietus described the album as "a record packed with phrases and licks that become earworms, passages that create vivid and empathetic dream scenarios, and spruce blasts of noise that give a real sense of energy". The album was included in Newsweek's "11 Great Overlooked Albums from 2017" list, with Zach Schonfeld stating that the band "charts the links between psych-rock and post-punk with unswerving intensity".

In February 2019, the band signed a worldwide deal with Sub Pop. The band's album, Of the Sun, was released in 2019 on the Glitterbeat label (Europe and elsewhere), Lovitt Records (USA), Moorworks (Japan) and Antena Krzyku (Poland), and deals with issues currently affecting Europe such as holocaust denial and populism. The album received a score of 7.2 from Pitchfork, and 7/10 from Clash, with Sam Walker-Smart calling it "the exhilarating new chapter from these unexpected up-and-comers". Will Hodgkinson, for The Times, gave the album four stars out of five, calling it "one of those curios that is really quite exciting". Louder Than War's Nigel Carr called it a "majestic piece of work". Mojo described it as a "gripping and energetic record".

== Musical style ==
Heather Phares, writing for Allmusic, described the band's music as mixing "post-rock, psych-rock, indie, and motorik influences". Critics have compared the band to Mercury Rev, My Bloody Valentine, Syd Barrett, and Can. Julian Marszalek, writing for The Guardian, described their music as blending "off-kilter melodies, dense instrumentation and lyrical explorations of the darkest side of the human condition". Pitchfork writer Stuart Berman described them as indie rock, "a potent fusion of lurching post-hardcore and shimmering shoegaze" and "dystopian post-punk". Clash writer Sam Walker-Smart described their music as "mixing elements of garage rock, dream pop, and something wholly original". The Wire's Ilia Rogatchevski described them as "an art rock band...fusing elements of post-hardcore, no wave and psychedelia". They have also been described as avant-punk, avant rock, psychedelic rock, and psychedelic art rock.

Kwiatkowski described his lyrics as exploring "rather dark and rather frighting sides of human nature", and the band's music as a "meditative, pessimistic thing", and "vital pessimism". The band's influences include the Beatles, the Velvet Underground, Sonic Youth, Fugazi, classical composers such as Bach and Schubert, and the films of Werner Herzog.

== Discography ==
=== Albums ===
- LP (2011)
- ++ (2013)
- Headache (2015), Blue Tapes
- Jolly New Songs (2017), Blue Tapes
- Of the Sun (2019), Glitterbeat/Lovitt Records
- B Flat A (2022), Glitterbeat/Lovitt Records

=== EPs ===
- EP (2010)
- I'll Find (2020), Glitterbeat/Lovitt Records
- Mourners (2025), Glitterbeat Records

=== Singles/download tracks ===
- "Felicy" (2013)
- "Sunny Day" (2013)
- "Coffin" (2017)
- "To Me" (2017)
- "Dream About" (2019), Sub Pop

== Awards ==
- Sztorm Roku Award, for LP, ++
- DOKI music award - Artist of the Year (twice)
- Splendor Gedanensis Award, for Headache
