= I Need My Girl =

Single by The National

from the album Trouble Will Find Me
- Released: February 3, 2014
- Recorded: 2012–13
- Genre: Indie rock
- Length: 4:05
- Label: 4AD
- Composers: Matt Berninger; Aaron Dessner; Bryce Dessner; Bryan Devendorf; Scott Devendorf
- Lyricist: Matt Berninger
- Producers: Aaron Dessner; Bryce Dessner

The National singles chronology
"Sea of Love" (2013)	"I Need My Girl" (2014)	"The System Only Dreams in Total Darkness" (2017)

"I Need My Girl" is a song written by Matt Berninger, Aaron Dessner, Bryce Dessner, Bryan Devendorf and Scott Devendorf of the American alternative rock band The National. The song was originally recorded by the band in 2013 for their sixth studio album, Trouble Will Find Me, where it appears as the tenth track.

A promotional single was released on European radio in November 2013, on American radio in January 2014, and on British radio in March 2014, becoming the fifth release by the band in promotion of Trouble Will Find Me. The song has been featured in the movie Entourage and on episodes of the television shows The Mindy Project, You and Shrinking

== Track listings ==
Digital download
No.	Title	Writer(s)	Producer(s)	Length
1.	"I Need My Girl"	Matt Berninger, Aaron Dessner, Bryce Dessner, Bryan Devendorf, Scott Devendorf	A Dessner, B Dessner	4:05
2.	"Learning"	Mike Hadreas	A Dessner, B Dessner	3:01
Total length:				7:06

European promotional single
No.	Title	Writer(s)	Producer(s)	Length
1.	"I Need My Girl"	Matt Berninger, Aaron Dessner, Bryce Dessner, Bryan Devendorf, Scott Devendorf	A Dessner, B Dessner	4:07

UK promotional single
No.	Title	Writer(s)	Producer(s)	Length
1.	"I Need My Girl" (Radio Edit)	Berninger, A Dessner, B Dessner, B Devendorf, S Devendorf	A Dessner, B Dessner

== Personnel ==
The National

- Matt Berninger – lead vocals
- Aaron Dessner – rhythm guitar, keyboards, vibraphone, harmonica
- Bryce Dessner – lead guitar, keyboards, e-bow, orchestration
- Bryan Devendorf – drums, percussion
- Scott Devendorf – bass guitar

Recording personnel

- Aaron Dessner – producer, additional recording
- Bryce Dessner – producer, additional recording
- Jonathan Low – recording
- Bella Blasko – recording assistant
- Nick Lloyd – additional recording
- Martyn Heyne – additional recording
- Craig Silvey – mixing
- Eduardo de la Paz Canel – mixing assistant
- John Horne – mixing assistant
- Greg Calbi – mastering

Artwork

- Randall J Lane – Artwork (Ballads)
- Lafont London – design
- Distant Station Ltd. – design

== Charts ==
Chart (2013)	Peak position
Belgium (Ultratop 50 Flanders)	34
Belgium (Ultratop 50 Wallonia)	35

== Certifications ==
Region	Certification	Certified units/sales
Canada (Music Canada)	Platinum	80,000^{‡}
New Zealand (RMNZ)	Gold	15,000^{‡}
United Kingdom (BPI)	Silver	200,000^{‡}
United States (RIAA)	Gold	500,000^{‡}
^{‡} Sales+streaming figures based on certification alone.

== Release history ==
=== Commercial ===
Country	Date	Format	Label
Australia	February 3, 2014	Digital download	4AD
United Kingdom	February 3, 2014	Digital download	4AD
United States	February 3, 2014	Digital download	4AD

=== Promotional ===
Region	Date	Radio format	Label
Europe	November 4, 2013	Modern rock / alternative radio	4AD
United States	January 27, 2014	Triple A radio	4AD
United States	January 28, 2014	Modern rock / alternative radio	4AD
United Kingdom	March 10, 2014	Modern rock / alternative radio	4AD
