= Laugh Track =

Studio album by the National
- Released: September 18, 2023
- Recorded: 2023
- Studio: Flora Recording & Playback, Portland, Oregon, United States; Soundcheck in Vancouver, Canada
- Genre: Indie rock
- Length: 59:19
- Label: 4AD
- Producer: The National

The National chronology
| First Two Pages of Frankenstein (2023) | Laugh Track (2023) | Rome (2024) |

Singles from Laugh Track
- 1. "Weird Goodbyes" Released: August 22, 2022; 2. "Alphabet City" / "Space Invader" Released: August 17, 2023

Laugh Track is the tenth studio album from American indie rock band the National. The surprise album was released on September 18, 2023, having been announced only days prior. The album's material was mostly written and recorded alongside the band's earlier 2023 album, First Two Pages of Frankenstein, with several songs being re-recorded at producer Tucker Martine's studio after honing their arrangements while on tour in 2023. Preceded by the singles, "Weird Goodbyes", "Alphabet City" and "Space Invader", the album features guest vocal appearances from Justin Vernon, Phoebe Bridgers and Rosanne Cash. Laugh Track has received positive reviews from critics.

== Recording and release ==
After taking a break during the COVID-19 pandemic, the band reunited and began working on a ninth studio album. Initially going through a difficult period of writer's block and depression, lyricist Matt Berninger and the band eventually produced enough material to fill two albums. Their first release from the sessions was the single, "Weird Goodbyes", which was released on August 22, 2022, and featured guest vocals from Bon Iver.

They released their ninth studio album, First Two Pages of Frankenstein, on April 28, 2023. The album did not contain "Weird Goodbyes", with bandmate Aaron Dessner hinting at a different "future home" for the song. The song was originally planned to be a stand-alone single, with Dessner noting "It was its own thing. But it also felt related to what we were doing. That was part of the logic for making another record—let's give "Weird Goodbyes" its own home."

Letting go of notions of how to make songs and allowing for some loose, unstructured approaches to come into it. Also, some songs literally came from just improvising on stage during soundcheck. Maybe it's having come through a really hard time and nearly not surviving as a band. We came back together and we felt healthy.

— Aaron Dessner on why this album feels happier and looser than previous work by The National.

During the National's tour in support of First Two Pages of Frankenstein, the band debuted new material and continued to workshop the remaining unreleased songs from the recording sessions, with the newly-recorded material favoring live drums over pre-programmed percussion. A press release accompanying the release of Laugh Track wrote: "Revelling in the license to radically upend its creative process, The National honed most of this material in live performances on tour this year, and captured those invigorated versions in impromptu sessions at producer Tucker Martine's Portland studio, Flora Recording & Playback." The album's closing track "Smoke Detector" was recorded in June 2023, during a soundcheck in Vancouver, when the band felt inspired to continue jamming in a rare move for them. The band consciously wanted to highlight Bryan Devendorf's drumming on the album, after having a more "compartmentalized role" on First Two Pages of Frankenstein: "This time we had the desire to make something that was more alive so that Bryan's playing would drive more."

Prior to the album's release, the singles "Alphabet City" and "Space Invader" were released on streaming services in August 2023 with artwork matching the single artwork for "Weird Goodbyes". In September, at the band's Homecoming 2023 festival in Cincinnati, the band publicly announced a second album called Laugh Track would be coming out digitally the same weekend. At the performance where the album was announced, 1,000 early vinyl LP copies of the album were sold, signed by each band member, with Berninger saying the full vinyl release would be sometime in November.

== Reception ==
Professional ratings
Aggregate scores
| Source | Rating |
|---|---|
| AnyDecentMusic? | 7.6/10 |
| Metacritic | 78/100 |
Review scores
| Source | Rating |
| AllMusic | 3.5/5 stars |
| Clash | 9/10 |
| The Guardian | 4/5 stars |
| The Independent | 4/5 stars |
| NME | 4/5 stars |
| Pitchfork | 6.8/10 |
| Rolling Stone | 4/5 stars |
| Paste | 9/10 stars |
| Evening Standard | 4/5 stars |
| Exclaim! | 8/10 stars |

Editors at AnyDecentMusic? characterized Laugh Track as a 7.6 out of 10, based on sixteen reviews. According to the review aggregator Metacritic, Laugh Track received "generally favorable reviews" based on a weighted average score of 78 out of 100 from 14 critic scores.

Editors at AllMusic rated this album 3.5 out of 5 stars, with critic Stephen Thomas Erlewine writing that the music is at "a precisely modulated temperature, bringing the songs to warmth slowly and steadily". Spencer Kornhaber of The Atlantic called this work "hopeful music about everything getting worse", with "bleak" lyrics paired with "music [that] still has the light-seeking quality of Frankenstein". Editors at BrooklynVegan shortlisted this as a notable release of the week and critic Andrew Sacher wrote that this music has "the same passion and attention to detail that they've had for two decades straight". At Clash Music, Sahar Ghadirian gave this release a 9 out of 10, writing that it speaks "to the duality of human emotion" with a playful title accompanied by emotional lyrics and highlights several tracks for their atmospherics. Mary Siroky of Consequence called this album "a fine but forgettable companion" to their previous release, continuing that the music is "at its best when things get full and rich" and it "serves as a gentle reminder that there's a difference between tenderness and boredom; long, meditative music is fine and good, but often more interesting when there's a destination in mind". In Exclaim!, Alex Hudson rated Laugh Track an 8 out of 10, calling it stronger than its predecessor: "where the earlier album sounded meek, the follow-up finds the National easily sinking into what they do best". In Evening Standard, David Smyth wrote that this "has a greater number of diversions from the set sound" for the band and "it sounds like they're starting to come back to life"; he scored it 4 out of 5 stars.

Shaad D'Souza of The Guardian rated this work 4 out of 5 stars, stating that it "feels like a fresh start" for the band and that it adopts "a more grownup take on the existential conundrums of earlier National records". In Hot Press, Edwin McFee gave this work a 7 out of 10, concluding that "There is an unmistakable flavour of "B-Side Material" off some tracks, especially on the aimless 'Dreaming', and you have to wonder what might have been if they combined the very best cuts from both LPs". The Independent's Helen Brown also gave Laugh Track 4 out of 5 stars, calling this a "loose, upbeat album" that has a "lower-slung" guitar sound. In The Irish Examiner, Ed Power gave this album 4 out of 5 stars, calling it "a refinement of the themes and textures of its predecessor". Irish Independent editors declared this album of the week and critic praising the lyric's exploration of romantic relationships and "artfully constructed" arrangements featuring live drumming. Tony Clayton-Lea of The Irish Times stating that this music "uses a similar sonic template" to their last, but also mixes different styles to show that the band "are as good at stillness as they are at movement"; he scored Laugh Track a 4 out of 5. At musicOMH, John Murphy gave this album 4 out of 5 stars, writing that "it's musically not such a close cousin of First Two Pages, but more its identical twin – the same brooding atmosphere, that bottled up tension that seems to have become Matt Berninger's vocal trademark – yet over a few plays, it seems to slowly take a life of its own".

In The New Zealand Herald, Graham Reid called Laugh Track "the wallowing of a troubled soul" with "alluring songs" that serve as "are beautifully played, atmospheric" therapy. Thomas Smith of NME rated Laugh Track 4 out of 5 stars, characterizing it as "a surprise companion record that's louder, more immediate and rawer than its predecessor" and in comparison to First Two Pages of Frankenstein, this album has "the looser structures and [the] decision to allow the songs room to grow, melodically and lyrically pays off". Editors at Paste chose this as Album of the Week, with critic Matt Mitchell scoring it a 9.0 out of 10, calling it one of the band's best "and maybe their single greatest feat since Sleep Well Beast"; the editors also included it among the best albums of September 2023. Writing for Pitchfork, Evan Rytlewski scored this release a 6.8 out of 10, writing that it "extends its predecessor's subdued mood and reclusive purview" and that both "albums over-relied on programmed drums", but this release has more of a "blissful, easy groove" than First Two Pages of Frankenstein.

Rolling Stone UK published a 4-out-of-5 star review from Will Richards that calls this release "an impulsive, fearless sister record" that is "the freest they've ever sounded" and the songs "flow with unfiltered energy and spontaneity". At Sputnikmusic, JohnnyoftheWell rated this album a 2.7 out of 5, stating that the band "have seemed less and less like a band firing on all cylinders, and increasingly franchise-esque" in recent years and continuing that with this work, "there is little here that substantively rectifies the underlying issues with the National's ongoing phase". Ryan Leas of Stereogum wrote that the band feel "looser—more alive—than they did on its predecessor" and continues to "travel that "ultimate National" path" from their prior release, with this one being "overall more dynamic and vibrant". At Uproxx, critic Steven Hyden created the mixtape Frankenstein Laughs made of tracks from The National's two 2023 albums and included this compilation among his favorite music of September.

At musicOMH, this album was rated 39th best of 2023. Editors at NME ranked this the 32nd best album of 2023. John Meagher of Irish Independent chose "Smoke Detector" as the third best foreign song of 2023, describing it as "a gnarlier, brighter companion record that was rapidly completed once their mojo had been reignited". Paste included this among the 30 best rock albums of 2023. At Under the Radar, this was rated the 61st best album of 2023.

== Track listing ==
All lyrics are written by Matt Berninger, except where noted.

Alligator track listing
| No. | Title | Lyrics | Music | Length |
|---|---|---|---|---|
| 1. | "Alphabet City" | | Bryce Dessner | 3:44 |
| 2. | "Deep End (Paul's in Pieces)" | | Aaron Dessner | 4:29 |
| 3. | "Weird Goodbyes" | | A. Dessner | 5:03 |
| 4. | "Turn Off the House" | | B. Dessner | 4:35 |
| 5. | "Dreaming" | | A. Dessner | 3:46 |
| 6. | "Laugh Track" | | A. Dessner | 4:24 |
| 7. | "Space Invader" | | A. Dessner, B. Dessner | 6:58 |
| 8. | "Hornets" | | A. Dessner | 4:35 |
| 9. | "Coat on a Hook" | | A. Dessner | 4:58 |
| 10. | "Tour Manager" | Berninger, Carin Besser | B. Dessner | 4:26 |
| 11. | "Crumble" | | A. Dessner | 4:35 |
| 12. | "Smoke Detector" | | A. Dessner, B. Dessner | 7:47 |

== Personnel ==
All credits for Laugh Track are adapted from the album's liner notes.

The National

- Matt Berninger
- Aaron Dessner
- Bryce Dessner
- Bryan Devendorf
- Scott Devendorf

Additional musicians

- Phoebe Bridgers – guest vocals on "Laugh Track"
- Rosanne Cash – guest vocals on "Crumble"
- Justin Vernon – guest vocals on "Weird Goodbyes"
- London Contemporary Orchestra – strings on "Weird Goodbyes"

Technical personnel

- The National – production
  - Bryce Dessner – orchestration
- Jonathan Low – recording, mixing
- Bella Blasko – recording
- Greg Calbi – mastering
- Peter Katis – additional production
- Tucker Martine – additional production, additional vocal recording
- James McAlister – additional production
- Justin Vernon – additional vocal production on "Weird Goodbyes"
- Tony Berg – additional vocal production on "Laugh Track", additional vocal recording
- John Leventhal – additional vocal production on "Crumble"
- Sean O'Brien – additional vocal recording
- Pentagram – design
- John Solimine – cover photography

== Charts ==
Chart performance for Laugh Track
| Chart (2023) | Peak position |
|---|---|
| Australian Albums (ARIA) | 51 |
| Austrian Albums (Ö3 Austria) | 21 |
| Belgian Albums (Ultratop Flanders) | 12 |
| Belgian Albums (Ultratop Wallonia) | 38 |
| Croatian International Albums (HDU) | 25 |
| Dutch Albums (Album Top 100) | 14 |
| German Albums (Offizielle Top 100) | 13 |
| Irish Albums (OCC) | 40 |
| New Zealand Albums (RMNZ) | 33 |
| Portuguese Albums (AFP) | 5 |
| Scottish Albums (OCC) | 5 |
| Spanish Albums (Promusicae) | 66 |
| Swiss Albums (Schweizer Hitparade) | 21 |
| UK Albums (OCC) | 24 |
| UK Americana Albums (OCC) | 3 |
| UK Independent Albums (OCC) | 2 |
| US Top Album Sales (Billboard) | 29 |

As a product of "Crumble" appearing on the Adult Alternative Airplay chart, Rosanne Cash appeared on a Billboard chart for the first time in 30 years.

== See also ==
- 2023 in American music
- List of 2023 albums
