= The System Only Dreams in Total Darkness =

Single by The National

from the album Sleep Well Beast
- Released: May 11, 2017
- Genre: Indie rock; art rock
- Length: 3:56
- Label: 4AD
- Songwriters: Aaron Dessner; Matt Berninger; Bryce Dessner
- Producers: Aaron Dessner; Bryce Dessner; Matt Berninger; Peter Katis

The National singles chronology
"I Need My Girl" (2014)	"The System Only Dreams in Total Darkness" (2017)	"Guilty Party" (2017)

Music video
- "The System Only Dreams in Total Darkness" on YouTube

"The System Only Dreams in Total Darkness" is a song by American indie rock band the National. It was released on 11 May 2017 as the lead single from their seventh studio album, Sleep Well Beast. The song was written by Aaron Dessner, Matt Berninger, and Bryce Dessner and produced by Aaron Dessner (with co-production by Bryce Dessner, Matt Berninger, and Peter Katis). A music video for the song was released on the same day and was directed by Casey Reas. It was the band's first song to appear on any airplay chart in the United States, ultimately topping Billboard's Adult Alternative Songs chart in August 2017 and peaking at No. 33 on Billboard's Alternative Songs chart early the following month. The song is featured in soundtrack of the EA Sports video game FIFA 18.

== Critical reception ==
On the day of its release, Pitchfork named it Best New Track, noting that "The System Only Dreams in Total Darkness" is "heavy and urgent and surprisingly aggressive—and not just because of Aaron Dessner's gnarly guitar solo in the middle."

Paste magazine named it one of the five best songs of the week, placing it at the number 4 position and wrote: "Floating in with poignant piano chords and twitchy guitar, 'The System' features multiple instrumental layers, with trumpet fluttering over propulsive percussion and Matt Berninger's thundering baritone. It's a fine return to form."

The song was also cited as one of Barack Obama's favorite songs of 2017 in a Spotify playlist compiled by Obama at the end of the year.

== Charts ==
=== Weekly charts ===
Chart (2017)	Peak position
Belgium (Ultratip Bubbling Under Flanders)	4
Czech Republic Modern Rock (IFPI)	16
US Adult Alternative Airplay (Billboard)	1
US Alternative Airplay (Billboard)	33

=== Year-end charts ===
Chart (2017)	Position
Iceland (Tónlistinn)	45
US Adult Alternative Songs (Billboard)	5
