= Bloodbuzz Ohio =

Single by the National

from the album High Violet
- Released: March 24, 2010 (digital download); May 3, 2010 (7")
- Genre: Indie rock; post-punk revival; dream pop
- Length: 4:36
- Label: 4AD (AD 3X22)
- Songwriters: Matt Berninger; Aaron Dessner; Padma Newsome
- Producer: The National

The National singles chronology
"Fake Empire" (2008)	"Bloodbuzz Ohio" (2010)	"Anyone's Ghost" (2010)

"Bloodbuzz Ohio" is a single by indie rock band the National, from their fifth studio album, High Violet. It is notable for Matt Berninger's baritone vocals. It was made available for download on the band's website on March 24, 2010. The song was also released on 7" vinyl (with the exclusive B-side "Sin-Eaters") on May 3, 2010. The cover art of this single is a work by artist Mark Fox, titled Jane Jacobs Understands The Beehive.

== Critical reception ==
One Thirty BPM described the track as "the beating heart of High Violet and most alarming insight into the psyche of the album." Pitchfork called it "a tense, drawn-out build with Matt Berninger's weathered baritone lording all over everything." On January 26, 2011, the song was voted at number 31 on the Triple J Hottest 100 of 2010, making it their highest entry on the countdown ever. In 2019, Pitchfork ranked the song at number 76 on its list of the 200 Best Songs of the 2010s.

In Rolling Stone, Rob Sheffield stated that the song is "about money", emphasizing that its chorus is the phrase "I still owe money, to the money, to the money I owe", and speculating that Ohio is "mentioned only because it sounds like 'I owe'". Sheffield further observed that the song's lyrics are "full of throwaway clues that never add up to any coherent storyline", but that it is nonetheless "sickeningly great" and has "undeniable emotional punch".

== Music video ==
Matt Berninger is the main focus of the first video from High Violet which shows him dapper in a suit, holding a drink, and walking the streets of New York City, seemingly lost in thought as he sings. Documentary film director D.A. Pennebaker appears in a cameo in the video, playing a bartender.

It was directed by Hope E. Hall, Andreas Burgess, and Berninger's wife Carin Besser.

== Performances ==
The National performed a special live studio performance and interview on American Public Media's Marketplace November 1, 2012.

== Covers ==
- Oh Land released a cover version in 2011.
- Julia Stone covered the song on her 2012 album, By the Horns.
- Irish artist Soak covered the song in 2019.
- Goose performed a version of the song on August 18, 2022, at Red Rocks Amphitheatre.

== Track listing ==
- "Bloodbuzz Ohio" (May 3, 2010)
  - 4AD (AD 3X22), 7" vinyl and digital download
  1. "Bloodbuzz Ohio" – 4:36
  2. "Sin-Eaters" – 3:40

== Chart history ==
It charted on the Belgian Flanders Ultratop 50 at number 49 for one week on week 25 of 2010. It then re-entered the chart, and on its third week on the chart, the song peaked at number 16. It has also charted on the Ultratip chart in Wallonia region at number 37.

Weekly chart performance for "Bloodbuzz Ohio"
Chart (2010)	Peak position
Belgium (Ultratop 50 Flanders)	16
Belgium (Ultratip Bubbling Under Wallonia)	37
Mexico Ingles Airplay (Billboard)	20
U.S. Billboard Hot Singles Sales	7
UK Physical Singles (OCC)	31
UK Indie (OCC)	19

== Certifications ==
Certifications for "Bloodbuzz Ohio"
Region	Certification	Certified units/sales
Canada (Music Canada)	Gold	40,000^{‡}
New Zealand (RMNZ)	Gold	15,000^{‡}
^{‡} Sales+streaming figures based on certification alone.
