= Matt Berninger =

American singer (born 1971)

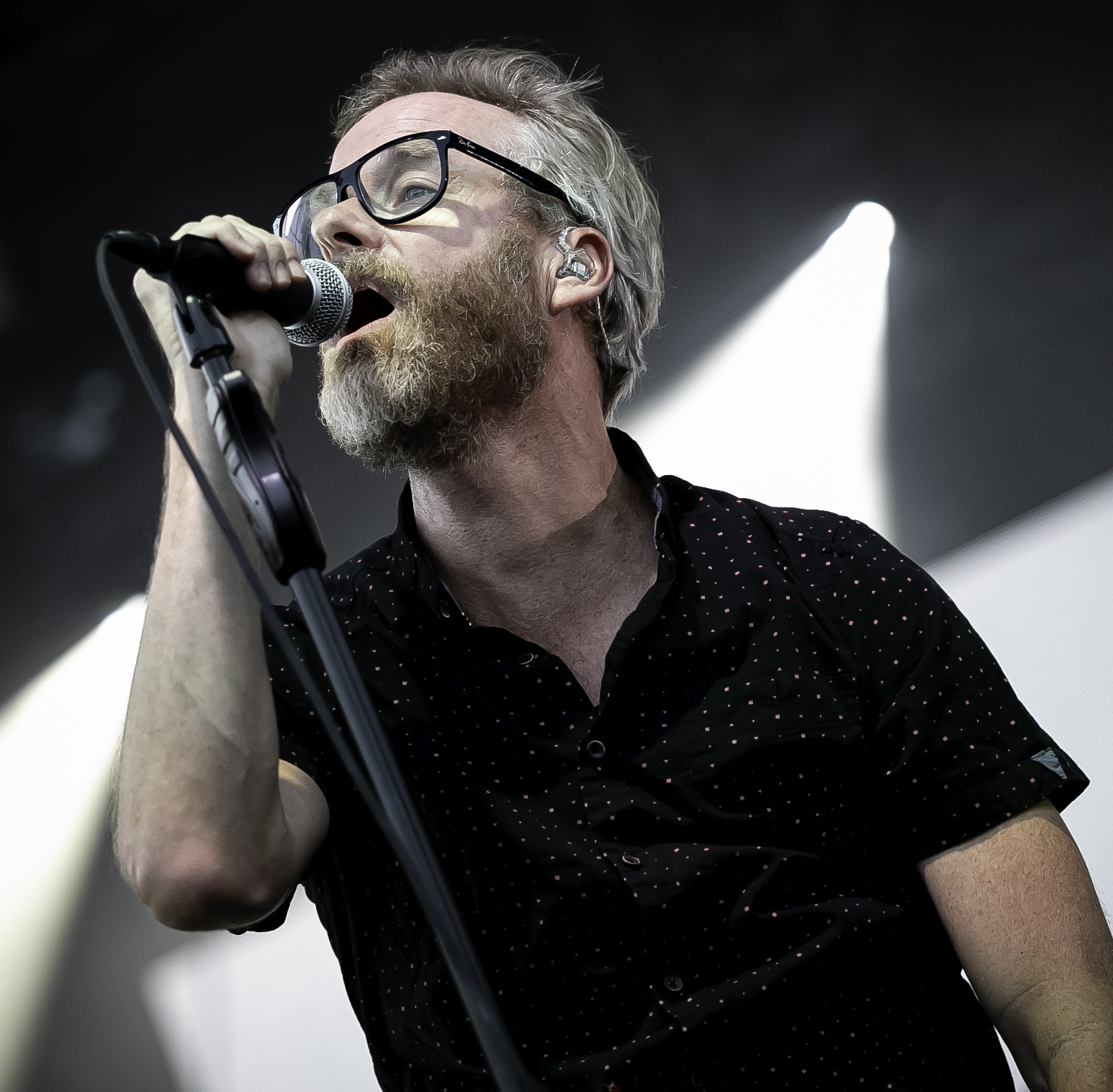
- Berninger in 2019

Background information
- Born: Matthew Donald Berninger; February 13, 1971 (age 55); Cincinnati, Ohio, U.S.
- Genre: Alternative rock
- Occupations: Singer; songwriter
- Instrument: Vocals
- Years active: 1991–present
- Member of: The National; EL VY

Matthew Donald Berninger (/ˌbɜːrnɪŋɜːr/, born February 13, 1971) is an American singer, primarily known as the frontman and lyricist of indie rock band The National. In 2014, he also formed the EL VY project with Brent Knopf of Ramona Falls and Menomena. They released the album Return to the Moon in November 2015. In May 2020, Berninger issued the title track from his solo debut album, Serpentine Prison, released in October 2020. His second solo album, Get Sunk, was released on May 30, 2025.

Berninger is known for his classic baritone voice.

== Early and personal life ==
Berninger is a 1989 graduate of St. Xavier High School in Cincinnati, Ohio. He went on to study graphic design at the University of Cincinnati, where he met fellow band member Scott Devendorf in 1991. The two quickly became friends. Berninger quit a career in advertising in his thirties to start The National. He told The Telegraph: "I was doing well [in advertising]. But, once I entertained the thought that maybe I wouldn't ever have to go and sit in conference rooms with MasterCard to discuss web ads again, I couldn't shake it."

Berninger is married to Carin Besser, a one-time fiction editor for The New Yorker, who has often contributed to the band's songwriting (in songs such as "Brainy" and "Ada" from the album Boxer, among others) and backup vocals. Together with Hope Hall and Andreas Burgess, Besser also helped direct the music video for "Bloodbuzz Ohio". They have a daughter named Isla. Berninger has stated the song "Afraid of Everyone" was influenced by his anxiety about being a new father. In 2023, he, his wife, and daughter moved from Venice, Los Angeles, to live in Connecticut.

As a child, Berninger knew Neil Armstrong, who was a family friend of his uncle. Armstrong taught him to play pool.

Berninger has two siblings: Tom (who directed Mistaken for Strangers, a film about The National) and Rachel.

Berninger has discussed his battles with depression, calling it "like a flu that just holds on." He found that, with antidepressants, he was able to "find a way back to music and happiness."

== In popular culture ==
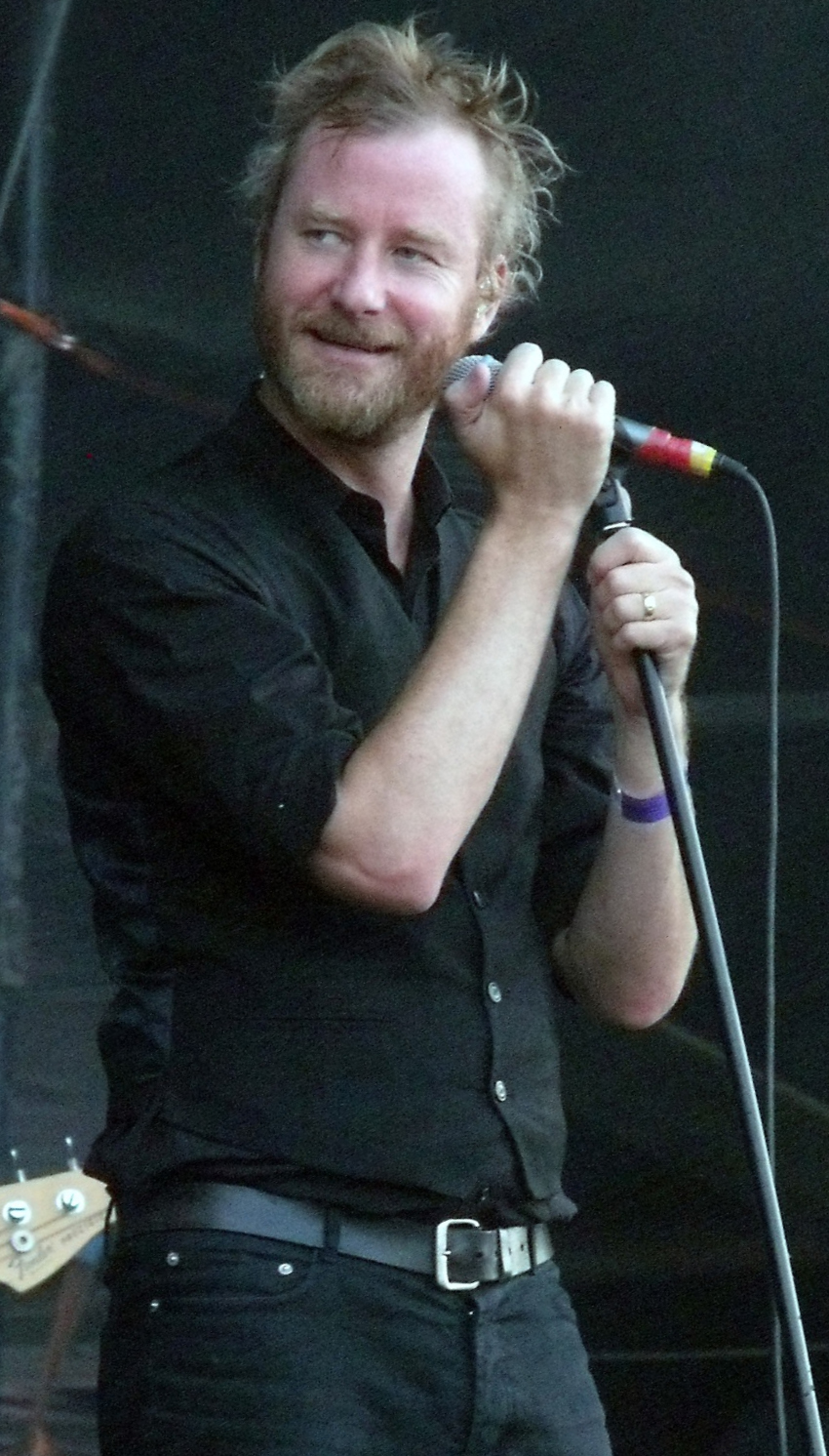
Berninger in 2011

In 2011, a portrait of Berninger was painted by British artist Joe Simpson; the painting was exhibited around the UK including a solo exhibition at The Royal Albert Hall.

In 2019, Berninger appeared in Between Two Ferns: The Movie. Along with Phoebe Bridgers, they contributed the song "Walking on a String" to its soundtrack.

In 2020, Berninger was the subject of an episode of the fictional erotic podcast, Dirty Diana, produced by Demi Moore.

In December 2023, Berninger was interviewed by David Letterman.

== Discography ==
=== Albums ===
Title	Details	Peak chart positions									
Title	Details	US	AUS	AUT	BEL (FL)	FRA	GER	IRE	NLD	SWI	UK
Serpentine Prison	Released: October 16, 2020; Label: Book Records	161	32	20	1	82	19	11	18	25	21
Get Sunk	Released: May 30, 2025; Label: Concord	—	—	41	4	—	13	—	38	23	27
Type It Up (EP)	Released: September 18, 2026; Label: Concord	—	—	—	—	—	—	—	—	—	—

=== Singles ===
==== As lead artist ====
Title	Year	Peak chart positions					Album
Title	Year	US AAA	US Alt. Dig.	US Rock Air.	BEL (FL) Tip.	UK Sales	Album
"Walking on a String" (featuring Phoebe Bridgers)	2019	—	24	—	— (Note: "Walking on a String" did not enter the Flanders Ultratop 50, but charted as an "extra tip" on the Ultratip chart.)	—	Non-album single
"Serpentine Prison"	2020	—	—	—	10	—	Serpentine Prison
"Distant Axis"	2020	—	—	—	41	—	Serpentine Prison
"One More Second"	2020	21	—	—	6	—	Serpentine Prison
"Pray It Away" (with Hannah Georgas)	2020	—	—	—	—	—	All That Emotion
"Let It Be"	2021	—	—	—	— (Note: "Let It Be" did not enter the Flanders Ultratop 50, but charted as an "extra tip" on the Ultratip chart.)	—	Serpentine Prison
"Bonnet of Pins"	2025	9	—	47	—	—	Get Sunk
"Breaking Into Acting" (featuring Hand Habits)	2025	—	—	—	—	—	Get Sunk
"Inland Ocean"	2025	—	—	—	—	29	Get Sunk
"—" denotes single that did not chart or was not released

==== As featured artist ====
Title	Year	Peak chart positions					Album
Title	Year	US Alt. Dig.	US Rock	NZ Hot	SCO	UK Sales	Album
"Representing Memphis" (Booker T. Jones featuring Sharon Jones & Matt Berninger)	2011	—	—	—	—	—	The Road from Memphis
"Coming Down" (Clap Your Hands Say Yeah featuring Matt Berninger)	2014	—	—	—	—	—	Only Run
"My Enemy" (Chvrches featuring Matt Berninger)	2019	17	28	—	96	—	Love Is Dead
"7 O'Clock News/Silent Night" (Phoebe Bridgers featuring Fiona Apple and Matt Berninger)	2019	—	—	—	—	—	If We Make It Through December
"We All Have" (Julia Stone featuring Matt Berninger)	2021	—	—	37	—	—	Sixty Summers
"South For The Winter" (Adia Victoria featuring Matt Berninger)	2021	—	—	—	—	—	A Southern Gothic
"Is This All There Is?" (Anna Calvi featuring Matt Berninger)	2026	—	—	—	—	14	Is This All There Is?
"—" denotes single that did not chart or was not released

=== Other appearances ===
Title	Year	Album
"I'll See You in My Dreams"	2013	Boardwalk Empire: Volume 2
"Hush (Theme From Turn)" (with Joy Williams)	2014	AMC's Turn: Original Soundtrack
"A Lyke Wake Dirge" (with Andrew Bird)	2014	AMC's Turn: Original Soundtrack
"I'm Waiting for the Man"	2021	I'll Be Your Mirror: A Tribute to The Velvet Underground & Nico

== Musical theater ==
=== Plays ===
- Cyrano (2018), with Carin Besser, Aaron Dessner, Bryce Dessner, and Erika Schmidt

== Film ==
- Cyrano (2021), with end credits showing "music written by Aaron Dessner and Bryce Dessner" and "lyrics written by Matt Berninger and Carin Besser"
