= You Had Your Soul with You =

2019 single by The National

Single by The National

from the album I Am Easy to Find
- Released: March 5, 2019
- Recorded: 2018
- Genre: Indie rock
- Length: 3:26
- Label: 4AD
- Songwriters: Carin Besser; Aaron Dessner; Bryce Dessner; Thomas Bartlett
- Producers: Aaron Dessner; Bryce Dessner; Matt Berninger; Mike Mills

The National singles chronology
"I'll Still Destroy You" (2017)	"You Had Your Soul with You" (2019)	"Light Years" (2019)

"You Had Your Soul with You" is a song by American indie rock band The National. It appears as the first track on the band's eighth studio album I Am Easy to Find. "You Had Your Soul with You" was released in the United States as the album's first single on March 5, 2019.

== Personnel ==
Credits adapted from I Am Easy to Find liner notes.

- Matt Berninger
- Aaron Dessner
- Bryce Dessner
- Bryan Devendorf
- Scott Devendorf

== Charts ==
=== Weekly charts ===
Weekly chart performance for "You Had Your Soul with You"
Chart (2019)	Peak position
Belgium (Ultratip Bubbling Under Flanders)	17
US Adult Alternative Airplay (Billboard)	9
US Hot Rock & Alternative Songs (Billboard)	48
US Rock & Alternative Airplay (Billboard)	49

=== Year-end charts ===
Year-end chart performance for "You Had Your Soul with You"
Chart (2019)	Position
US Adult Alternative Songs (Billboard)	35
