= C'mon C'mon (soundtrack) =

C'mon C'mon (Original Motion Picture Score)

Film score by Aaron Dessner and Bryce Dessner
- Released: November 12, 2021
- Genre: Film score
- Length: 33:09
- Label: A24 Music
- Producer: Aaron Dessner; Bryce Dessner

Aaron Dessner and Bryce Dessner chronology
All of This Unreal Time (2021)	C'mon C'mon (2021)	Cyrano (2021)

Singles from C'mon C'mon (Original Motion Picture Score)
- 1. "I Won't Remember?" Released: November 5, 2021

C'mon C'mon (Original Motion Picture Score) is the film score to the 2021 film of the same name directed by Mike Mills. Featuring original score composed by The National's Aaron Dessner and Bryce Dessner, the film also marked Aaron's feature film scoring debut. The soundtrack was released on November 12, 2021, through A24's music division, to positive reviews and fetched an award for Best Original Score in an Independent Film at the 12th Hollywood Music in Media Awards.

== Development ==
"We went through a long process filled with exploring places that ultimately didn't work, but we had to kind of find this gentle sound, this particular melody and set of chords that really holds the specific emotional world, the energy of the music becomes gentle, cloud-like, intimate."

— Mike Mills

Mills had directed the short film I Am Easy to Find that accompanied as a visual album to The National's 2019 album of the same name. Both Aaron and Bryce, were onboard for C'mon C'mon when Mills was writing the screenplay, he read the one line of an uncle raising his orphaned nephew and share their moments, that linked their real life moments in Aaron's life; they shared a good rapport with the director, the latter claiming him as a "musical and collaborative" person and felt that "[scoring his] film was almost like having a band with him". They did some of the basic sketches of the film score, while simultaneously working on Cyrano (2022).

Due to the COVID-19 pandemic, Aaron who was in France, and Bryce in New York, had to interact virtually as well as conducting the scoring process through Zoom for both the films. Comparing with Cyrano which was a periodic, baroque score, C'mon C'mon was more experimental by comparison and more impressionistic. The film had "this elusive ambiguity to it that has a lot to do with how Mike makes films. There's an improvised nature to his filmmaking that I think he also wanted to capture in the score. So anytime we were too composed he would push us off our axis." Mills praised their "subtle, minimalistic and gossamer kind of style" that they had implemented in the score.

The score preceded with the single "I Won't Remember?" released on November 6, 2021. The album was released through A24's newly formed music label, A24 Music as their first release in their catalogue on November 12, a week before the release of the film.

== Track listing ==
No.	Title	Length
1.	"Here They All Come"	2:39
2.	"Who's Taking Care of Jesse?"	2:04
3.	"The Orphan"	2:31
4.	"Happy Sad Empty Full"	2:24
5.	"Kids of New York City"	2:34
6.	"Why Can't I Just Sleep With You?"	1:48
7.	"I'm Not Fine And That's A Totally Reasonable Response"	2:20
8.	"The Orphan Returns"	1:23
9.	"Kids of New Orleans"	3:30
10.	"You'll See A Lot Of Bad It's Beautiful"	3:19
11.	"I Won't Remember?"	2:41
12.	"Hopper's Theme"	2:30
13.	"Be Funny When You Can"	3:26
Total length:		33:09

== Reception ==
David Ehrlich of IndieWire and David Rooney of The Hollywood Reporter complimented the score as "twinkly" and "shimmering". Richard Lawson of Vanity Fair wrote "A score of murmuring pianos and other sweetly plaintive sounds, by the National's Aaron and Bryce Dessner gives the film an extra dimension of cozy ache." Jessica Kiang of Los Angeles Times wrote "Aaron and Bryce Dessner's glistening score swells — is as magical and romantic a vision of Los Angeles as we've recently seen."

== Accolades ==
Award	Date of ceremony	Category	Recipient(s)	Result	Ref.
Hollywood Music in Media Awards	November 17, 2021	Original Score — Independent Film	Aaron Dessner and Bryce Dessner	Won	
