= I Am Easy to Find =

I Am Easy to Find may refer to:

- I Am Easy to Find (album), a 2019 album by The National, and its title track
- I Am Easy to Find (film), a companion film to the album
