= Cherry Tree (EP) =

2004 EP by the National

EP by The National
- Released: July 20, 2004
- Recorded: Gretchen's Kitchen; Tarquin Studios
- Genre: Indie rock
- Length: 28:26
- Language: English
- Label: Brassland
- Producers: Peter Katis; Nick Lloyd; Padma Newsome; The National

The National chronology
Sad Songs for Dirty Lovers (2003)	Cherry Tree (2004)	Alligator (2005)

Cherry Tree is an EP by the American indie rock band the National, released in July 2004. It was reissued on June 28, 2011, by Brassland Records, the same label on which it was initially published.

== Songs ==
"Murder Me Rachael" is a live version taken from a Black Sessions recording, while "Reasonable Man (I Don't Mind)" is a song featuring Padma Newsome. In addition to the CD, Cherry Tree was initially released on limited-edition red-colored 10" vinyl by Shake It!, a record shop in the band's hometown of Cincinnati, Ohio. It has since had numerous repressings by Brassland Records.

An alternative version of the song "About Today" was featured in the 2011 movie Warrior, directed by Gavin O'Connor, and played in the 2013 film The East and the television show The Path.

The title song, "Cherry Tree", was featured in the credits of the documentary If a Tree Falls: A Story of the Earth Liberation Front.

The song "All the Wine" was included on The National's follow-up album, Alligator.

Professional ratings
Review scores
Source	Rating
Robert Christgau	(dud)
Spin	(favorable)

== Track listing ==
All lyrics are written by Matt Berninger

No.	Title	Music	Length
1.	"Wasp Nest"	Berninger	3:22
2.	"All the Wine"	Aaron Dessner, Bryce Dessner, Scott Devendorf, Bryan Devendorf	3:20
3.	"All Dolled-Up in Straps"	B. Dessner	4:11
4.	"Cherry Tree"	B. Dessner	4:27
5.	"About Today"	A. Dessner	4:11
6.	"Murder Me Rachael" (Live)	A. Dessner, B. Dessner, S. Devendorf, B. Devendorf	3:37
7.	"A Reasonable Man (I Don't Mind)"	A. Dessner	5:22

== Personnel ==
- Recorded by Peter Katis at Tarquin Studios, Nick Lloyd at Gretchen's Kitchen, Padma Newsome in Australia, and The National in Brooklyn.
- Mixed by Nick Lloyd at Gretchen's Kitchen.
- "Murder Me Rachael" is an extract from Black Session #200, broadcast by France Inter, Paris, on November 17, 2003, Studio 105.
- "Murder Me Rachael" sound engineered by George Sautour
- Photography by Pope Rathman
- Design by Distant Station Ltd.

Additional musicians

- Padma Newsome – viola, violin, vocals (on tracks 3 and 7), guitar (on track 7)
- Nate Martinez – electric guitars (on track 1)
- Nick Lloyd – piano and organ

== Weekly charts ==
Weekly chart performance for Cherry Tree
Chart (2021)	Peak position
Scottish Albums (Official Charts)	30
