= LNZNDRF =

American indie rock band

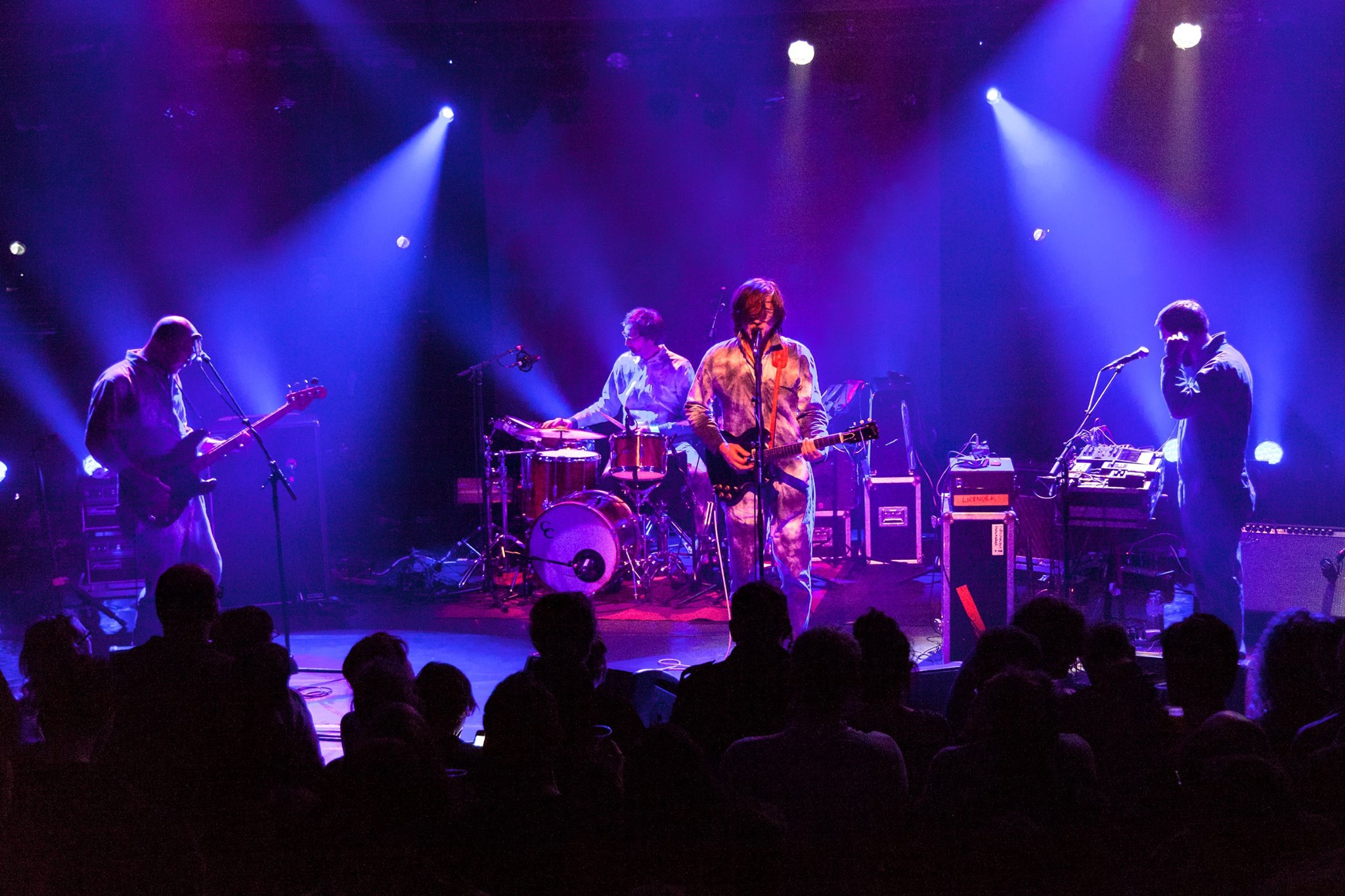
- LNZNDRF performing live in 2016

Background information
- Origin: Cincinnati, Ohio
- Years active: 2016–present
- Labels: 4AD
- Members: Bryan Devendorf; Scott Devendorf; Ben Lanz; Aaron Arntz
- Website: lnzndrf.com

LNZNDRF (disemvoweling of Lanzendorf) is an American indie rock supergroup based in Cincinnati, Ohio. The group is a collaboration between Ben Lanz and Aaron Arntz (both of Beirut), and brothers Scott and Bryan Devendorf (both of The National).

LNZNDRF's eponymous debut was recorded in a church in Cincinnati and contains eight songs, all of which were improvised and edited down from longer jams. The album was released by 4AD on February 19, 2016. On August 5, 2016, the band released "Green Roses," with a running time of 25 minutes. The To a Lake EP was released on September 4, 2020, followed by II on January 29, 2021. Both of these were recorded at Public Hi-Fi in Austin, Texas in September 2019 and then pared down by Lanz over the next year.

== Discography ==
- LNZNDRF (2016)
- "Green Roses"/"Salida" 12" (2016)
- To a Lake EP (2020)
- II (2021)
