= The Alcott =

Single by the National featuring Taylor Swift

from the album First Two Pages of Frankenstein
- Released: April 28, 2023
- Studio: Long Pond (Hudson Valley)
- Genre: Downtempo
- Length: 4:27
- Label: 4AD
- Songwriters: Matt Berninger; Aaron Dessner; Taylor Swift
- Producer: The National

The National singles chronology
"Eucalyptus" (2023)	"The Alcott" (2023)	"Alphabet City / Space Invader" (2023)

Taylor Swift singles chronology
"Lavender Haze" (2022)	"The Alcott" (2023)	"Karma" (2023)

Lyric video
- "The Alcott" on YouTube

"The Alcott" is a song by American band the National featuring American singer-songwriter Taylor Swift. The song appears on the band's album First Two Pages of Frankenstein (2023) and was released as a single on April 28, 2023. It is a downtempo ballad with prominent piano. It was produced at Long Pond Studio in Hudson Valley.

== Music and lyrics ==
Produced at Long Pond studio in Hudson Valley, "The Alcott" is a downtempo ballad. It incorporates prominent piano in its production. Andrew Trendell of NME described the song as "arena-ready lighters-up". Pitchfork critic Brad Shoup found the track to feature a "subliminal industrial rapping". Towards the end, Swift performs with her solo vocals.

== Reception ==
In Clash, James Mellen picked "The Alcott" as a "truly stunning" track that showcases Swift's "immaculate" vocals and Berninger's "universal" performance. In a mixed review, Shoup found the track to be mostly of Swift's artistry and labelled it "the National (Taylor's Version)", and wrote "The mess is there, just not the chaos."

== Charts ==
Chart performance for "The Alcott"
Chart (2023)	Peak position
Australia Digital Tracks (ARIA)	26
Canada Hot Digital Songs (Billboard)	20
Ireland (IRMA)	63
New Zealand Hot Singles (RMNZ)	5
UK Singles (Official Charts)	90
US Digital Song Sales (Billboard)	11
US Adult Alternative Airplay (Billboard)	9
US Adult Pop Airplay (Billboard)	23
US Hot Rock & Alternative Songs (Billboard)	13
US Rock & Alternative Airplay (Billboard)	40

== Release history ==
Release dates and formats for "The Alcott"
Region	Date	Format	Label(s)	Ref.
Italy	April 28, 2023	Radio airplay	4AD	
United States	May 1, 2023	Adult album alternative	4AD	
