= Claire Kohda =

English-Japanese author and musician

- Born: 1990 (age 35–36)
- Other name: Claire Kohda Hazelton
- Education: King's College London
- Years active: 2014–present
- Partner: Tom Lathan

Claire Kohda (born 1990) is an English-Japanese writer, violinist, and illustrator. She is known for her debut novel Woman, Eating (2022).

== Early life ==
Born to a Japanese mother and an English father, Kohda is from the Thanet District of Kent. She attended Clarendon House Grammar School in Ramsgate. She studied Music at King's College London.

== Career ==
=== Writing ===
Kohda began her career writing about art for Aesthetica and The Observer, and literature for The Guardian, and the Times Literary Supplement. She also contributed to the Financial Times, Frieze, and Asymptote.

At the end of 2020 and start of 2021, Virago Press and HarperVia (a HarperCollins imprint) acquired the rights Kohda's debut novel Woman, Eating, which was published in spring 2022 to critical acclaim. The novel is a character study on Lydia, "millennial vampire" art school graduate living on her own in London for the first time. Kohda had written the novel during the COVID-19 lockdown when her violin career was put on hold. She wanted to "step away from... reverence for the vampire" and "remove the vampire from the horror genre", taking inspiration from Asian literature that features the supernatural in grounded settings, to dissect human nature "by observing Lydia trying to just simply live her life in our world".

Kohda contributed the essay Portraits to East Side Voices: Essays Celebrating East and Southeast Asian Identity in Britain, and the short story Tygress to the 2023 Virago collection Furies: Stories of the Wicked, Wild and Untamed. She also illustrated Tom Lathan's 2024 book Lost Wonders: 10 Tales of Extinction from the 21st Century. She joined the judges' panel of the 2025 Women's Prize Discoveries programme.

=== Music ===
Kohda plays the violin and the koto. As a professional violinist, Kohda contributed to Max Richter's Voices and Voices 2. With the London Contemporary Orchestra (LCO), her contributions appeared on National's 2023 albums First Two Pages of Frankenstein and Laugh Track. She recorded with the (LCO) at Abbey Road Studios for the Sigur Rós album Átta. She also played with the likes of Jessie Ware, Pete Tong, Ella Eyre, RY X and Deep Purple as well as the English Chamber Orchestra and the Heritage Orchestra. She contributed to the soundtracks of the films The Two Popes (2019), The Matrix Resurrections (2021), and Tár (2022).

== Personal life ==
Kohda is in a relationship with environmental author and journalist Tom Lathan.

== Bibliography ==
=== Novels ===
- Woman, Eating (2022)

=== Short stories ===
- "Tygress" in Furies: Stories of the Wicked, Wild and Untamed (2023)
- "An End" (2024) in Electric Literature

=== Essays ===
- "Portraits" in East Side Voices: Essays Celebrating East and Southeast Asian Identity in Britain
