= Sad Songs for Dirty Lovers =

Studio album by The National
- Released: September 2, 2003
- Studio: Excello (Brooklyn, NY); Additional recording: Gretchen's Kitchen (Brooklyn, NY); Headgear (Brooklyn, NY); Puck Building (New York, NY); Two locales in New Haven, CT; Bryan Devendorf's basement (Brooklyn, NY)
- Genre: Indie rock; alternative rock; folk rock
- Length: 44:54
- Label: Brassland
- Producer: Nick Lloyd; Paul Heck; Peter Katis

The National chronology
The National (2001)	Sad Songs for Dirty Lovers (2003)	Cherry Tree (2004)

Singles from Sad Songs for Dirty Lovers
- 1. "Slipping Husband" Released: November 17, 2003

Sad Songs for Dirty Lovers is the second studio album by indie rock band the National. It was released in 2003 on Brassland Records. This is the first album on which the band worked with Peter Katis, who would produce the band's next albums Alligator and Boxer.

The album is the first to feature guitarist and multi-instrumentalist Bryce Dessner (the twin brother of Aaron Dessner) as a full member, making it the first album to be featured as a five-piece band.

== Reception ==
Professional ratings
Aggregate scores
Source	Rating
Metacritic	78/100
Review scores
Source	Rating
AllMusic	3/5 stars
Alternative Press	4/5
Drowned in Sound	9/10
Pitchfork	8.4/10
Q	3/5 stars
Rolling Stone	3/5 stars
Uncut	4/5 stars

The album received very positive reviews from music critics, earning a Metacritic aggregate score of 78 based on 13 reviews, indicating 'generally positive reviews'.

As of 2010 the album has sold an approximate 27,000 copies in the US. The album was one of three early records that the band reissued remastered versions of in 2021.

== Track listing ==
All songs are credited to the National. Actual songwriters are adapted from Tidal.

All lyrics are written by Matt Berninger.

No.	Title	Music	Length
1.	"Cardinal Song"	Aaron Dessner, Bryce Dessner, Bryan Devendorf, Scott Devendorf	6:18
2.	"Slipping Husband"	A. Dessner, B. Dessner, B. Devendorf, S. Devendorf	3:22
3.	"90-Mile Water Wall"	A. Dessner	3:44
4.	"It Never Happened"	A. Dessner, B. Dessner, B. Devendorf, S. Devendorf	4:37
5.	"Murder Me Rachael"	A. Dessner, B. Dessner, B. Devendorf, S. Devendorf	3:45
6.	"Thirsty"	B. Dessner	3:48
7.	"Available"	A. Dessner	3:20
8.	"Sugar Wife"	A. Dessner	2:21
9.	"Trophy Wife"	A. Dessner	3:32
10.	"Fashion Coat"	A. Dessner	2:02
11.	"Patterns of Fairytales"	S. Devendorf	3:43
12.	"Lucky You"	A. Dessner	4:22

== Personnel ==
The National

- Matt Berninger
- Aaron Dessner
- Bryce Dessner
- Bryan Devendorf
- Scott Devendorf

Additional musicians

- Padma Newsome – viola, violin
- Nick Lloyd – piano, keyboards
- Luke Hughett – vocals (on "Thirsty")
- Nate Martinez – guitar (on "Cardinal Song")
- Steve LoPresti – French horn and mellophone (on "Sugar Wife")

Technical personnel

- Nick Lloyd – production, additional recording
- Paul Heck – co-production, production (on "Murder Me Rachael")
- Peter Katis – co-production, production (on "Murder Me Rachael"), recording (on "Murder Me Rachael"), engineering (on "Murder Me Rachael"), mixing
- Hugh Pool – basic track recording
- Dan Long – additional recording
- John Loder – mastering
- Padma Newsome – orchestration
- Distant Station – design

== Weekly charts ==
Weekly chart performance for Sad Songs for Dirty Lovers
Chart (2021)	Peak position
Scottish Albums (OCC)	45
