= First Two Pages of Frankenstein =

Studio album by the National
- Released: April 28, 2023
- Studios: Long Pond (Hudson Valley, New York)
- Genre: Rock
- Length: 47:34
- Label: 4AD
- Producer: The National

The National chronology
I Am Easy to Find (2019)	First Two Pages of Frankenstein (2023)	Laugh Track (2023)

Singles from First Two Pages of Frankenstein
- 1. "Tropic Morning News" Released: January 18, 2023; 2. "New Order T-Shirt" Released: February 23, 2023; 3. "Eucalyptus" Released: March 22, 2023; 4. "Your Mind Is Not Your Friend" Released: April 12, 2023; 5. "The Alcott" Released: April 28, 2023

First Two Pages of Frankenstein is the ninth studio album by the American indie rock band the National, released on April 28, 2023, by 4AD. The album was produced by The National at Long Pond studio in upstate New York and features guest appearances from Sufjan Stevens, Phoebe Bridgers, and Taylor Swift.

== Background and recording ==
After the release of I Am Easy to Find (2019) and the cancellation of The National's touring as a result of the COVID-19 pandemic, the band members retreated from each other. Lead singer and lyricist Matt Berninger released the solo record Serpentine Prison. Bryce Dessner, now living in France, worked on film scores and classical compositions. Aaron Dessner produced two albums by Taylor Swift and recorded the highly collaborative How Long Do You Think It's Gonna Last?, the second studio album with Bon Iver's Justin Vernon as part of their side-project Big Red Machine. Bryan and Scott Devendorf assisted other musicians with making their music.

Work on a ninth National album was initially stalled while Berninger navigated "a very dark spot where I couldn't come up with lyrics or melodies at all. Even though we'd always been anxious whenever we were working on a record, this was the first time it ever felt like maybe things really had come to an end." Bryce Dessner said that the band eventually "managed to come back together and approach everything from a different angle, and because of that we arrived at what feels like a new era for the band." According to Aaron Dessner, a turning point came with the lead single "Tropic Morning News", which was co-written with Berninger's wife, Carin Besser, and partly recorded live in Hamburg: "When Matt came in with that song in the depths of his depression, it felt like a turning point for us. It's almost Dylan-esque in its lyrics and it's so much fun to play; everything suddenly felt like it was coming alive again."

The album was produced by the National at Aaron Dessner's Long Pond studio in Hudson Valley, New York. It features guest vocalists Sufjan Stevens, Phoebe Bridgers and Taylor Swift. Additional recording sessions took place at numerous studios and locations across the United States and Europe. The album also features the London Contemporary Orchestra, who recorded sessions at The Empire Studio in London in May 2022, and at RAK Studios in London in August 2022.

== Artwork ==
Created by the design company Pentagram, the front cover of First Two Pages of Frankenstein features a photograph of a young boy holding a mannequin's head. The photograph was taken by the boy's father, John Solimine, an illustrator and longtime friend of vocalist Matt Berninger. Solimine and Berninger met as dishwashers in a Cincinnati restaurant. Solimine has previously worked with the National on several concert posters and alongside Berninger on illustrations for his side project EL VY. In possible relation to the album's title, Solimine released a children's book titled Does Frankenstein Get Hungry? in 2018.

Bass guitarist Scott Devendorf, a former graphic designer who works closely on the band's album covers, described the mannequin as "not a phrenological head". Exclaim! listed the album cover as 24th worst of the year, quoting journalist Matty Monroe's tweet comparing it to those of Walk the Moon, Cold War Kids, Cage the Elephant, Twenty One Pilots, Grouplove and Fitz and the Tantrums.

== Release and promotion ==
On August 19, 2022, Aaron Dessner revealed in an interview with Laura Barton in the i newspaper that a new National album was scheduled for 2023. A standalone single, "Weird Goodbyes", featuring Bon Iver, was released three days later. The National first teased the album on social media on January 13, 2023, with a video of Berninger reading Mary Shelley's 1818 novel Frankenstein on a piano bench. The posts linked to a password-protected page on their official website. The unlocked page featured an image of an open book with text mirroring Shelley's novel, but written as a letter addressed "To Mrs. Bridgers, England" and mentioning people named "Taylor" and "Uncle Sufjan".

First Two Pages of Frankenstein was officially announced on January 18, 2023, with the release of the album's lead single, "Tropic Morning News", and the announcement of a supporting tour starting in May 2023. The tour will feature the opening acts Patti Smith, Soccer Mommy, the Beths, and Bartees Strange. A second single, "New Order T-Shirt", was released on February 23, 2023. The release was accompanied by the sale of a limited edition T-shirt created in partnership with New Order. A third single, "Eucalyptus", was released on March 22, 2023. The fourth single, "Your Mind Is Not Your Friend", was released on April 12, 2023. "The Alcott" was released as the fifth single to Italian radio stations on April 28, 2023. It was released to US triple A radio on May 1, 2023.

== Critical reception ==
Professional ratings
Aggregate scores
Source	Rating
AnyDecentMusic?	7.5/10
Metacritic	79/100
Review scores
Source	Rating
AllMusic	4/5 stars
Clash	8/10
The Daily Telegraph	4/5 stars
The Independent	4/5 stars
Mojo	3/5 stars
NME	5/5 stars
The Observer	3/5 stars
Pitchfork	6.6/10
Rolling Stone	4/5 stars
Uncut	8/10

At Metacritic, which assigns a normalized rating out of 100 to reviews from professional publications, the album received an average score of 79, based on 21 reviews.

Andrew Trendell of NME gave the album a perfect 5-star rating, deeming it the band's best album since Trouble Will Find Me. James Mellen of Clash praised the album's "level of fluidity and richness stitched together with the highest calibre of performance, production and songwriting. Like Frankenstein and his monster, the commitment to the design and blueprint of this record is incredible; every minute detail, sound, glitch, has been selected with the utmost care by The National". Rolling Stone's Clayton Purdom called it "a remarkable reassertion of the band's potency".

Reviewing the album for AllMusic, editor Stephen Thomas Erlewine declared that, "Melodies aren't absent, but they're not forceful, they're sung as suggestions. Forward movement is achieved through shifts in texture and feel, momentum created through layers of harmony and weaving acoustic instruments through electronic beddings."

In a mixed review, Grayson Haver Currin of Mojo called it "a sometimes-striking record that suggests new ground without actually reaching it". Giselle Au-Nhien Nguyen of The Sydney Morning Herald questioned if the band "might be stagnating with this release, which has less of the daring ideas they've explored on their last few".

== Track listing ==
All lyrics are written by Matt Berninger, except where noted.

First Two Pages of Frankenstein track listing
No.	Title	Lyrics	Music	Length
1.	"Once Upon a Poolside" (featuring Sufjan Stevens)	Matt Berninger, Carin Besser	Bryce Dessner	3:36
2.	"Eucalyptus"		B. Dessner	4:24
3.	"New Order T-Shirt"		Aaron Dessner	4:56
4.	"This Isn't Helping" (featuring Phoebe Bridgers)		A. Dessner	4:04
5.	"Tropic Morning News"	Berninger, Besser	A. Dessner	5:09
6.	"Alien"	Berninger, Besser	B. Dessner	4:07
7.	"The Alcott" (featuring Taylor Swift)	Berninger, Swift	A. Dessner, Swift	4:27
8.	"Grease in Your Hair"	Berninger, Besser	A. Dessner	3:57
9.	"Ice Machines"	Berninger, Besser	A. Dessner	4:16
10.	"Your Mind Is Not Your Friend" (featuring Bridgers)		A. Dessner	4:24
11.	"Send for Me"		Berninger; A. Dessner	4:14
Total length:				47:34

Japanese edition (bonus track)
No.	Title	Music	Length
12.	"Weird Goodbyes" (featuring Robin Pecknold) (Live in London 2022)	A. Dessner	5:44
Total length:			55:39

== Personnel ==
The National – performance

- Matt Berninger
- Aaron Dessner
- Bryce Dessner – orchestration
- Bryan Devendorf
- Scott Devendorf
- Benjamin Lanz – touring member
- Kyle Resnick – touring member

Featured vocalists

- Sufjan Stevens (1)
- Phoebe Bridgers (4, 10)
- Taylor Swift (7)

Additional musicians

- Thomas Bartlett
- Lisa Hannigan
- Curt Kiser
- James McAlister
- So Percussion (Josh Quillen, Adam Sliwinski, Jason Teuting, Eric Cha-Beach)
- Mina Tindle
- Andi Toma
- Jan St. Werner

Technical personnel

- Jonathan Low – recording, mixing
- Bella Blasko – recording
- Greg Calbi – mastering
- Steve Fallone – mastering
- James McAlister – additional production
- Tony Berg – additional vocal production (4, 10)
- Sean O'Brien – additional vocal recording
- Will Maclellan – additional vocal recording
- Adam Armstrong – additional recording
- David Chalmin – additional recording
- Greg Giorgio – additional recording
- Peter Katis – additional recording
- Matt Latchaw – additional recording
- Jake Merritt – additional recording
- Matt Poirier – additional recording
- Ber Quinn – additional recording
- Ben Rice – additional recording
- Chad Wahlbrink – additional recording
- Jeremy Murphy – orchestra recording (RAK)
- Liam Hebb – assistant orchestra recording (RAK)
- Fiona Cruickshank – orchestra recording (Empire)
- Laura Beck – assistant orchestra recording (Empire)

Artwork

- Pentagram (Luke Hayman, Shigeto Akiyama, Gracia Lee) – design
- John Solimine – cover photo of Lou Solimine
- Josh Goleman – band photo

London Contemporary Orchestra

- Robert Ames – conductor
- Harry George – copyist
- Cassandra Gurling – recording project manager
- Amy Hinds – orchestra manager
- Charlotte Marino – assistant orchestra manager
- Galya Bisengalieva – 1st violin (Empire)
- Marianne Haynes – 1st violin (Empire)
- Venetia Jollands – 1st violin (Empire)
- Raja Halder – 1st violin (Empire)
- Charis Jenson – 1st violin (Empire)
- Ellie Consta – 1st violin (Empire)
- Kirsty Mangan – 1st violin (Empire)
- Nicole Crespo O'Donoghue – 1st violin (Empire)
- Zahra Benyounes – 1st violin (RAK)
- Agata Daraskaite – 1st violin (RAK)
- Alexandra Caldon – 1st violin (RAK)
- Anna Ovsyanikova – 1st violin (RAK)
- Kirsty Mangan – 1st violin (RAK)
- Juan Gonzalez – 1st violin (RAK)
- Anna De Bruin – 1st violin (RAK)
- Matthew Bain – 1st violin (RAK)
- Gillon Cameron – 2nd violin (Empire)
- Hazel Correa – 2nd violin (Empire)
- Claire Hazelton – 2nd violin (Empire, RAK)
- Guy Button – 2nd violin (Empire)
- Mathhew Bain – 2nd violin (Empire)
- Radhika De Saram – 2nd violin (Empire)
- Mandhira De Saram – 2nd violin (RAK)
- Radhika De Saram – 2nd violin (RAK)
- Miles Brett – 2nd violin (RAK)
- Claire Kennington – 2nd violin (RAK)
- Akiko Ishikawa – 2nd violin (RAK)
- Jonny Byers – cello (Empire, RAK)
- Laura Moody – cello (Empire)
- Rebecca Burden – cello (Empire)
- Ashok Klouda – cello (Empire)
- Sergio Serra – cello (Empire, RAK)
- Peteris Sokolovskis – cello (Empire, RAK)
- Max Ruisi – cello (RAK)
- Louise McMonagle – cello (RAK)
- Daisy Vatalaro – cello (RAK)

== Charts ==
=== Weekly charts ===
Weekly chart performance for First Two Pages of Frankenstein
Chart (2023)	Peak position
Australian Albums (ARIA)	9
Austrian Albums (Ö3 Austria)	3
Belgian Albums (Ultratop Flanders)	1
Belgian Albums (Ultratop Wallonia)	5
Canadian Albums (Billboard)	16
Danish Albums (Hitlisten)	8
Dutch Albums (Album Top 100)	1
Finnish Albums (Suomen virallinen lista)	15
French Albums (SNEP)	29
German Albums (Offizielle Top 100)	6
Irish Albums (Official Charts)	1
Italian Albums (FIMI)	34
New Zealand Albums (RMNZ)	4
Norwegian Albums (VG-lista)	18
Portuguese Albums (AFP)	1
Scottish Albums (Official Charts)	3
Spanish Albums (Promusicae)	15
Swedish Albums (Sverigetopplistan)	18
Swiss Albums (Schweizer Hitparade)	5
UK Albums (Official Charts)	4
UK Independent Albums (Official Charts)	1
US Billboard 200	14
US Independent Albums (Billboard)	3
US Top Alternative Albums (Billboard)	1
US Top Rock Albums (Billboard)	1

=== Year-end charts ===
Year-end chart performance for First Two Pages of Frankenstein
Chart (2023)	Position
Belgian Albums (Ultratop Flanders)	68
