= The National (album) =

Studio album by The National
- Released: October 30, 2001
- Recorded: Gretchen's Kitchen, Brooklyn; Gretchen's Pantry, New Haven
- Genre: Alternative rock; country rock; indie rock
- Length: 43:51
- Label: Brassland
- Producer: The National, Nick Lloyd

The National chronology
The National (2001)	Sad Songs for Dirty Lovers (2003)

Professional ratings
Review scores
Source	Rating
AllMusic	4/5 stars
Pitchfork	6.6/10

The National is the debut studio album by American indie rock band the National, released on October 30, 2001, on Brassland Records. Recorded prior to guitarist Bryce Dessner's full arrival into the band, The National was produced by both Nick Lloyd and the band itself. Now-bassist Scott Devendorf performs both guitar and backing vocals on this album, with guitarist and multi-instrumentalist Aaron Dessner on bass and guitar duties, making this the only National album to be featured as a quartet.

The album features a more alt-country quality in comparison to future albums. Lyrics from "29 Years" would later be used in "Slow Show" from the band's 2007 album, Boxer.

== Background and recording ==
The album features guest contributions from then forthcoming member Bryce Dessner, with his brother Aaron noting, "When we recorded [the album], my brother wasn't even in the band. We made the record before we ever played a show. We did it just to do it."

== Artwork ==
The album's front cover features drummer Bryan Devendorf in a swimming pool.

== Track listing ==
All songs are credited to the National. Actual songwriters adapted from Tidal.

All lyrics are written by Matt Berninger.

No.	Title	Music	Length
1.	"Beautiful Head"	Aaron Dessner	3:08
2.	"Cold Girl Fever"	Dessner, Scott Devendorf, Bryan Devendorf	4:06
3.	"The Perfect Song"	Dessner, S. Devendorf, B. Devendorf	3:15
4.	"American Mary"	Dessner	4:03
5.	"Son"	Dessner, S. Devendorf, B. Devendorf	5:20
6.	"Pay for Me"	Dessner, S. Devendorf, B. Devendorf	3:23
7.	"Bitters & Absolut"	Dessner, S. Devendorf, B. Devendorf	4:00
8.	"John's Star"	Dessner, S. Devendorf, B. Devendorf	3:05
9.	"Watching You Well"	S. Devendorf	3:02
10.	"Theory of the Crows"	Dessner	4:37
11.	"29 Years"	Berninger	2:50
12.	"Anna Freud"	S. Devendorf	3:09

== Personnel ==
All credits for The National adapted from the album's liner notes.

=== The National ===
- Matt Berninger – lead vocals
- Aaron Dessner – bass, guitar, mandola
- Bryan Devendorf – drums, backing vocals
- Scott Devendorf – guitar, backing vocals

=== Additional musicians ===
- Mike Brewer
- Bryce Dessner
- Nathalie Jonas
- Nick Lloyd
- Jeff Salem

=== Recording personnel ===
- The National – production
- Nick Lloyd – producer, recording, mixing
- Mike Brewer – pre-production
- Jeff Salem – pre-production
- Ue Nastasi – mastering

=== Artwork ===
- Mauricio Carey – photography
- Pope Rathman – photography

== Charts ==
Chart performance for The National
Chart (2021)	Peak position
Belgian Albums (Ultratop Flanders)	133
Scottish Albums (OCC)	65
