= I Am Easy to Find (film) =

- Directed by: Mike Mills
- Written by: Mike Mills
- Produced by: Emma Wilcockson; David Zander
- Starring: Alicia Vikander
- Cinematography: David Voldheim
- Edited by: Aaron Beekum
- Music by: The National
- Release date: April 22, 2019
- Running time: 27 minutes
- Country: United States
- Language: English

I Am Easy to Find is a 2019 American short film directed by Mike Mills starring Alicia Vikander. The film was released on May 13, 2019 on the official YouTube page of the rock band the National.

The short is shot in black and white and features Vikander playing a woman from birth to death.

The film features a medley of songs from the album of the same name by the band the National; however, the songs in the film differ from those in the album as Mills was brought in early in production and given permission to alter the songs as he saw fit. As the two projects developed concurrently, the final songs ended up differing from one another.

The title for both the short film and the album of the same name was chosen by Mills from a lyric in the song of the same name. The song was originally titled Washington before Mills insisted on altering it.

== Synopsis ==
Shot in black and white featuring 140 subtitles, the film is the biography of a woman from birth to death as she grows up, moves away from her family, falls in love, and creates a new family of her own.

== Production ==
After finishing his film 20th Century Women, Mike Mills reached out to the band the National as he was interested in directing a music video for their album Sleep Well Beast. Instead the band responded by sending him fragments from their upcoming album encouraging Mills to use them as he saw fit. Mills was acquainted with actress Alicia Vikander who had trained as a ballet dancer and who had told him she wanted an opportunity to use her dance skills on film. When Mills conceived of the idea of making a biographical film on one woman's life from birth to death played by one actress he decided to use Vikander as her dance skills would help her embody the different ranges of motion necessary to portray the character.

The film was shot in 2018 over 5 days.

== Release ==
The movie premiered at a "Special Evening With the National" event at the Beacon Theatre in New York on April 22, 2019. A Q&A about the film followed moderated by Julien Baker featuring Mike Mills and two members of the National, Bryce Dessner, and Matt Berninger. Following was an audience Q&A along with the live premier of the whole album along with a few prior released songs. It was subsequently released on YouTube on May 13, 2019. A version with director's commentary as well as a version with commentary by Berninger and Carin Besser; his wife; was also released along with their Q&A at The Beacon on the same day within the description of said video.
