= Pfarmers =

- Genres: Experimental rock
- Years active: 2015–Present
- Label: Joyful Noise
- Members: Danny Seim; Bryan Devendorf; Dave Nelson
- Website: Bandcamp

Pfarmers is an experimental American indie rock side project, made up of Danny Seim (Menomena, Lackthereof), Bryan Devendorf (The National), and Dave Nelson (Sufjan Stevens, St. Vincent).

Their debut album, Gunnera, was released in early 2015. A second studio album, Our Puram, was released the following year.

== Discography ==
- Gunnera (2015)
- Our Puram (2016)
