= Alligator (The National album) =

Studio album by the National
- Released: April 12, 2005
- Studio: Tarquin Studios; Drummerman Studios; Jess and Ole's House; Headgear Studios
- Genre: Indie rock; post-punk revival
- Length: 48:00
- Label: Beggars Banquet
- Producer: Peter Katis and Paul Mahajan

The National chronology
Cherry Tree (2004)	Alligator (2005)	Boxer (2007)

Singles from Alligator
- 1. "Abel" Released: March 14, 2005; 2. "Secret Meeting" Released: August 29, 2005; 3. "Lit Up" Released: November 14, 2005

Alligator is the third studio album by American indie rock band the National, released on April 12, 2005 on Beggars Banquet. Recorded and produced by Peter Katis and Paul Mahajan, the album brought The National critical acclaim and increased their fanbase significantly.

The band performed album track "The Geese of Beverly Road" at the wedding of producer Peter Katis. A photo of the band performing on stage, with couples dancing in the foreground, became the cover of the band's next album Boxer.

The band supported Barack Obama's presidential candidacy in 2008. In July of that year, the band designed and sold a T-shirt featuring Obama's image above the words "Mr. November", a reference to both the closing track on the album and the month of the U.S. presidential election. All proceeds were donated to Obama's campaign. The song had been written, in part, about John Kerry's candidacy four years earlier.

== Reception ==
Professional ratings
Aggregate scores
Source	Rating
Metacritic	82/100
Review scores
Source	Rating
AllMusic	4/5 stars
Alternative Press	4/5
Entertainment Weekly	A−
Mojo	4/5 stars
NME	6/10
Pitchfork	7.9/10
Q	4/5 stars
Rolling Stone	3/5 stars
Stylus Magazine	A−
Uncut	5/5 stars

Writing for Pitchfork, Joe Tangari described Alligator as "satisfying and engaging," though "not quite as bracing" as the band's previous album, Sad Songs for Dirty Lovers. Christian Brodal of NPR stated that "the band seems to trust the melodies to do the work, letting them unwind slightly surreptitiously and on the best songs hook you with a winning off-hand sweetness," though criticized some songs on the record as feeling "too slight".

Alligator appeared on many year-end top 10 lists, including Uncut and Planet Sound, both of which ranked it as the number two album of 2005. Pitchfork ranked Alligator at number 40 in their top albums of the 2000s list. Alligator has sold over 200,000 copies worldwide.

In a 2015 retrospective, Stereogum's Chris Deville stated that "listening to it now is like looking at an old photograph of someone you’ve known forever and being stunned by their childlike vigor." A 2020 retrospective, from Consequence's Grant Sharples stated that Alligator was the "first record on which The National are The National," noting that the album was also the first time where a "quiet band decided to get loud."

== Track listing ==
All lyrics are written by Matt Berninger.

Alligator track listing
No.	Title	Music	Length
1.	"Secret Meeting"	Aaron Dessner, Scott Devendorf	3:44
2.	"Karen"	Bryce Dessner	3:59
3.	"Lit Up"	A. Dessner	2:55
4.	"Looking for Astronauts"	A. Dessner	3:23
5.	"Daughters of the SoHo Riots"	B. Dessner, S. Devendorf	3:59
6.	"Baby, We'll Be Fine"	A. Dessner	3:21
7.	"Friend of Mine"	A. Dessner	3:25
8.	"Val Jester"	B. Dessner	3:00
9.	"All the Wine"	A. Dessner, B. Dessner, S. Devendorf, Bryan Devendorf	3:15
10.	"Abel"	A. Dessner	3:37
11.	"The Geese of Beverly Road"	A. Dessner, S. Devendorf	4:57
12.	"City Middle"	B. Dessner	4:28
13.	"Mr. November"	A. Dessner	3:57

Limited expanded edition bonus disc
No.	Title	Length
1.	"The Thrilling of Claire"	4:32
2.	"Driver, Surprise Me"	3:20
3.	"Lit Up" (Remix)	3:00
4.	"Secret Meeting" (Remix)	3:45
5.	"The Geese of Beverly Road" (Live)	4:35
6.	"Abel" (Enhanced Video)
7.	"Lit Up" (Enhanced Video)
8.	"Daughters of the SoHo Riots" (Enhanced Video)

== Singles ==
- "Abel" (March 14, 2005)
  - CD single b/w: "Driver, Surprise Me" and "Keep It Upstairs"
  - 7" single b/w: "Warm Singing Whores"
  - Digital download b/w: "The Thrilling of Claire"
- "Secret Meeting" (August 29, 2005)
  - Digital download: "Secret Meeting" (Remix) b/w: "The Geese of Beverly Road" (Live)
- "Lit Up" (November 14, 2005)
  - CD single: "Lit Up" (Remix) b/w: "You've Done It Again, Virginia"
  - Digital download: "Lit Up" (Remix) b/w: "You've Done It Again, Virginia" and "Lit Up" (Parisian Party Version)

== Personnel ==
The National

- Matt Berninger
- Aaron Dessner
- Bryce Dessner
- Scott Devendorf
- Bryan Devendorf

Additional musicians

- An-Lin Bardin – cello
- Carin Besser – backing vocals
- Nathalie Dessner – backing vocals
- Rachael Elliott – bassoon
- Peter Katis – backing vocals
- Nick Lloyd – piano, organ, keyboards
- Nate Martinez – guitar
- Padma Newsome – viola, violin, piano, organ, orchestration
- Sara Phillips – clarinet

Recording personnel

- Paul Mahajan – recording
- Peter Katis – additional recording and production, mixing
- Greg Calbi – mastering

Artwork

- Mathieu Saura – photography
- Distant Station Ltd. – design

== Certifications ==
Certifications for Alligator
Region	Certification	Certified units/sales
United Kingdom (BPI)	Silver	60,000^{‡}
^{‡} Sales+streaming figures based on certification alone.
