= I Am Easy to Find (album) =

Studio album by the National
- Released: May 17, 2019
- Studio: Long Pond (Hudson Valley, New York): Earthstar (Venice, California); Aaron's Garage (Brooklyn, New York); Alna Chapel (Hudson, New York); Delta (Paris, France); Dreamland (Hurley, New York); FuturePast (Hudson, New York); Funkhaus (Berlin, Germany); Marble Garden (Cincinnati, Ohio); The Overlook (Berlin, Germany); Public HiFi (Austin, Texas); Reservoir (New York City); Sonic (Dublin, Ireland); Studio G (Brooklyn, New York); Saint Germain (Paris, France)
- Genre: Indie rock; art rock; post-punk revival
- Length: 63:35
- Label: 4AD
- Producer: Mike Mills; The National

The National chronology
| Sleep Well Beast (2017) | I Am Easy to Find (2019) | First Two Pages of Frankenstein (2023) |

Singles from I Am Easy to Find
- 1. "You Had Your Soul with You" Released: March 5, 2019; 2. "Light Years" Released: April 4, 2019; 3. "Hairpin Turns" Released: May 1, 2019; 4. "Rylan" Released: May 16, 2019; 5. "Hey Rosey" Released: October 8, 2019

I Am Easy to Find is the eighth studio album by American indie rock band The National, released on May 17, 2019, via 4AD. The follow-up to the band's 2017 album, Sleep Well Beast, it was supported by the lead single, "You Had Your Soul with You", and accompanied by a short film of the same name, directed by Mike Mills and starring Alicia Vikander. Vikander is also featured on the album cover. A trailer was released for the companion film along with the announcement of the album. A tour promoting the album began in June 2019.

== Background ==
The bulk of the album was recorded at Long Pond studio in Hudson Valley, New York. Parts were recorded in other cities, including Paris, Berlin, Dublin, Cincinnati, Austin, and Brooklyn. The album and film, while having influenced each other, were essentially made separately. A press release stated that the album "is not the soundtrack" for the film; the idea for the album itself came after the film was shot.

The album features female vocalists including Lisa Hannigan, Sharon Van Etten, Mina Tindle, Gail Ann Dorsey, Kate Stables, and the Brooklyn Youth Chorus.

== Critical reception ==
Professional ratings
Aggregate scores
| Source | Rating |
|---|---|
| AnyDecentMusic? | 7.7/10 |
| Metacritic | 81/100 |
Review scores
| Source | Rating |
| AllMusic | 3.5/5 stars |
| And It Don't Stop | A− |
| The Guardian | 4/5 stars |
| The Independent | 3/5 stars |
| Mojo | 4/5 stars |
| NME | 4/5 stars |
| Pitchfork | 7.6/10 |
| Q | 4/5 stars |
| Rolling Stone | 4/5 stars |
| The Times | 4/5 stars |

I Am Easy to Find was met with universal acclaim, receiving a score of 81 on Metacritic, the review aggregating site. Reviewing in his "Consumer Guide" column, Robert Christgau said that "almost every track is open to substantive female input on a musical whole that feels consistently interactive and empathetic and also not so glum—even when you can’t pin down exact meanings, it makes love sound possible." More negative critics, such as The Observer's Phil Mongredien, complained about the album's flatness and inaccessibility.

=== Year-end rankings ===
Year-end rankings for I Am Easy to Find
| Publication | Accolade | Rank | Ref. |
|---|---|---|---|
| The A.V. Club | Top 20 Albums of 2019 | 20 | |
| Gothamist | Best Album of 2019 | 7 | |
| Louder Than War | Top 50 Albums of 2019 | 11 | |
| Magnet Magazine | Top 25 Albums of 2019 | 9 | |
| MusicOMH | Top 50 Albums of 2019 | 14 | |
| The Skinny | Top Ten Albums of 2019 | 6 | |

== Track listing ==
All tracks are written by Matt Berninger and produced by Aaron Dessner, unless noted otherwise.

I Am Easy to Find track listing
| No. | Title | Lyrics | Music | Length |
|---|---|---|---|---|
| 1. | "You Had Your Soul with You" | Carin Besser | Aaron Dessner; Bryce Dessner; Thomas Bartlett | 3:26 |
| 2. | "Quiet Light" | | A. Dessner; B. Dessner | 4:15 |
| 3. | "Roman Holiday" | | | 3:34 |
| 4. | "Oblivions" | Berninger; Besser | A. Dessner; B. Dessner | 4:13 |
| 5. | "The Pull of You" | Berninger; Besser | | 3:58 |
| 6. | "Hey Rosey" | Besser | | 4:14 |
| 7. | "I Am Easy to Find" | | A. Dessner; B. Dessner | 4:30 |
| 8. | "Her Father in the Pool" | Instrumental | B. Dessner | 1:02 |
| 9. | "Where Is Her Head" | Berninger; Besser; Mike Mills | | 4:41 |
| 10. | "Not in Kansas" | | | 6:44 |
| 11. | "So Far So Fast" | | A. Dessner; B. Dessner | 6:36 |
| 12. | "Dust Swirls in Strange Light" | Mills | B. Dessner | 3:18 |
| 13. | "Hairpin Turns" | Berninger; Besser | A. Dessner; B. Dessner | 4:27 |
| 14. | "Rylan" | | | 3:43 |
| 15. | "Underwater" | Instrumental | B. Dessner | 1:21 |
| 16. | "Light Years" | | | 3:33 |
| Total length: | | | | 63:35 |

Notes

- The album's liner notes credit all lyrics as written by Berninger, Besser and Mills; and all music as composed by A. Dessner and B. Dessner. Track-by-track credits are adapted from Tidal.
- "Not in Kansas" contains an interpolation of "Noble Experiment", originally performed by Thinking Fellers Union Local 282 on the album Strangers from the Universe, written by Mark Davies, Anne Eickelberg, Brian Hageman, Jay Paget and Hugh Swarts.

== Personnel ==
The National – arrangement, performance

- Matt Berninger
- Aaron Dessner
- Bryce Dessner – orchestration
- Bryan Devendorf
- Scott Devendorf
- Benjamin Lanz – touring member
- Kyle Resnick – touring member

Featured vocalists

- Gail Ann Dorsey (1–3, 6, 10, 13)
- Eve Owen (2, 9)
- Diane Sorel (2)
- Mina Tindle (4)
- Lisa Hannigan (5, 10, 11, 13)
- Sharon Van Etten (5)
- Kate Stables (7, 10, 14)
- Brooklyn Youth Chorus (8, 12, 15)

Technical personnel

- Jonathan Low – recording, additional mixing, score mixing
- Bella Blasko – assistant engineering
- Peter Katis – album mixing
- Zach Seivers – score sound design
- Greg Calbi – mastering
- Steve Fallone – mastering
- Sean O'Brien – additional recording
- Aaron Dessner – additional production, additional recording
- Bryce Dessner – additional production
- Matt Berninger – additional production
- Curt Kiser – additional production (6, 13)
- Thomas Bunio – additional recording
- Isaac Joel Karns – additional recording
- Steph Marriano – additional recording
- Ber Quinn – additional recording
- Andi Toma – additional recording
- Eli Walker II – additional recording
- Jan St. Werner – additional recording

Artwork

- Osk – album design
- Mike Mills – creative direction

Additional musicians

- Thomas Bartlett – keyboards, piano
- Andrew Broder – drum programming
- Eric Cha-Beach – percussion, chord stick
- Gail Ann Dorsey – vocals
- Lisa Hannigan – vocals
- Isaac Joel Karns – synthesizer
- Benjamin Lanz – synthesizer, trombone
- Mélissa Laveaux – vocals
- Padma Newsome – strings
- Eve Owen – vocals
- Kyle Resnick – vocals
- Alexander Ridha – synthesizer
- Ben Sloan – drums
- Diane Sorel – vocals
- Jan St. Werner – programming
- Kate Stables – vocals
- Mina Tindle – vocals
- Andi Toma – programming
- Jason Treuting – drums, percussion, chord stick
- Sharon Van Etten – vocals
- Justin Vernon – OP-1

Orchestration

- Jonathan Gandelsman – 1st violin (New York)
- Katie Hyun – 1st violin (New York)
- Monica Davis – 1st violin (New York)
- Ben Russell – 1st violin (New York)
- Charlotte Juillard – 1st violin (Paris)
- Domitille Gillon – 1st violin (Paris)
- Nikolai Spassov – 1st violin (Paris)
- Marc Desjardins – 1st violin (Paris)
- Ariadna Teyssier – 1st violin (Paris)
- Rachel Shapiro – 2nd violin (New York)
- Guillaume Pirard – 2nd violin (New York)
- Sarah Whitney – 2nd violin (New York)
- Emily Dagget Smith – 2nd violin (New York)
- Leslie Boulin Raulet – 2nd violin (Paris)
- Matthias Piccin – 2nd violin (Paris)
- Pauline Hauswirth – 2nd violin (Paris)
- Emilie Duch-Sauzeau – 2nd violin (Paris)
- Caitlyn Lynch – viola (New York)
- Caleb Burhans – viola (New York)
- Miranda Sielaff – viola (New York)
- Sarah Chenaf – viola (Paris)
- Marine Gandon – viola (Paris)
- Benachir Boukhatem – viola (Paris)
- Wolfram Koessel – cello (New York)
- Andrea Lee – cello (New York)
- Alan Richardson – cello (New York)
- Juliette Salmona – cello (Paris)
- Barbara Le Liepvre – cello (Paris)
- Ella Jarrige – cello (Paris)
- Logan Coale – double bass (New York)
- Thomas Garoche – bass (Paris)
- Grégoire Dubruel – bass (Paris)

Brooklyn Youth Chorus

- Maya Baijal
- Jeanne Bransbourg
- Joseph Brooks
- Morgan Colton
- Cora Clum
- Fannie Feynberg
- Thalia Glyptis
- Lila Hasenstab
- Natalie Hawkins
- Amayah Hutchinson
- Abigail Lienhard
- Raquel Klein
- Maya Renaud-Levine
- Clara Rosarius
- Maya Sequira
- Tafyana Sgaraglino
- Avery Soto
- Sarah Sotomayor
- Katy Urda
- Anna Vartsaba
- Clementine Vonnegut
- Mariana Weaver
- Aliyah Weiss
- Dianne Berkun Menaker – artistic direction

== Short film ==
Director Mike Mills developed a short film based on early clips of the songs featured on the album. As the two projects developed concurrently, the final songs used in each differ from one another.

Mills chose the title for both the short film and the album from a lyric in the song of the same name. The song was originally titled "Washington" before Mills insisted on altering it.

=== Cast ===
- Alicia Vikander
- Kate Adams as Young mother
- Riley Shanahan as Young father

== Charts ==
=== Weekly charts ===
Weekly chart performance for I Am Easy to Find
| Chart (2019) | Peak position |
|---|---|
| Australian Albums (ARIA) | 6 |
| Austrian Albums (Ö3 Austria) | 2 |
| Belgian Albums (Ultratop Flanders) | 2 |
| Belgian Albums (Ultratop Wallonia) | 9 |
| Canadian Albums (Billboard) | 4 |
| Croatian International Albums (HDU) | 1 |
| Danish Albums (Hitlisten) | 8 |
| Dutch Albums (Album Top 100) | 5 |
| Finnish Albums (Suomen virallinen lista) | 8 |
| French Albums (SNEP) | 32 |
| German Albums (Offizielle Top 100) | 2 |
| Irish Albums (IRMA) | 3 |
| Italian Albums (FIMI) | 15 |
| Japanese Albums (Oricon) | 98 |
| Lithuanian Albums (AGATA) | 30 |
| New Zealand Albums (RMNZ) | 6 |
| Norwegian Albums (VG-lista) | 14 |
| Polish Albums (ZPAV) | 31 |
| Portuguese Albums (AFP) | 2 |
| Scottish Albums (OCC) | 3 |
| Spanish Albums (PROMUSICAE) | 11 |
| Swedish Albums (Sverigetopplistan) | 11 |
| Swiss Albums (Schweizer Hitparade) | 2 |
| UK Albums (OCC) | 2 |
| US Billboard 200 | 5 |
| US Top Rock Albums (Billboard) | 1 |

=== Year-end charts ===
Year-end chart performance for I Am Easy to Find
| Chart (2019) | Position |
|---|---|
| Belgian Albums (Ultratop Flanders) | 55 |
| US Independent Albums (Billboard) | 15 |
| US Top Rock Albums (Billboard) | 84 |
