= Sleep Well Beast =

Studio album by The National
- Released: September 8, 2017
- Studio: Long Pond (Hudson Valley); Saint Germain (Paris) (Note: Orchestral session); Illegoland (Los Angeles) (Note: Vocal sessions); Future Past (Hudson, New York) (Note: Additional sessions); Funkhaus Berlin (Berlin); Michelberger Hotel (Berlin)
- Genre: Indie rock; art rock
- Length: 57:32
- Label: 4AD
- Producer: Aaron Dessner; Bryce Dessner (Note: Orchestration and co-production on all tracks); Matt Berninger (Note: Co-production on tracks 4, 6, 9); Peter Katis (Note: Additional production on tracks 2, 4)

The National chronology
Trouble Will Find Me (2013)	Sleep Well Beast (2017)	I Am Easy to Find (2019)

Singles from Sleep Well Beast
- 1. "The System Only Dreams in Total Darkness" Released: May 11, 2017; 2. "Guilty Party" Released: June 28, 2017; 3. "Carin at the Liquor Store" Released: August 8, 2017; 4. "Day I Die" Released: August 29, 2017; 5. "I'll Still Destroy You" Released: October 23, 2017

Sleep Well Beast is the seventh studio album by the American indie rock band The National, released on September 8, 2017, by 4AD. The album won the Grammy Award for Best Alternative Music Album in 2018.

== Promotion ==
On May 9, and May 10, 2017, the National's Twitter page tweeted out two short audio teasers, one from the title track and the other from the lead single, "The System Only Dreams in Total Darkness".

=== Singles ===
The first single from the album, "The System Only Dreams in Total Darkness", was released on May 11, 2017, alongside the album's announcement. The second single, "Guilty Party", was released on June 28, 2017. A third single, "Carin at the Liquor Store", was released on August 8, 2017, followed by the fourth, "Day I Die". on August 29. The fifth single, "I'll Still Destroy You", was released on October 23, 2017.

== Packaging and marketing ==
The artwork for Sleep Well Beast consists of a black and white photograph, shot by Graham MacIndoe, of the side of a barn in Hudson Valley, New York dating back to the 18th century, bought by the guitarist Aaron Dessner and rebuilt as the album's recording studio. MacIndoe also took numerous photographs of the band during recording sessions for the album inserts. Andrea Trabucco-Campos and Elaynna Blaser-Gould, with partner Luke Hayman, of the British design firm Pentagram, were the art directors for the album's packaging.

Unusually, Pentagram also created the branding and identity for Sleep Well Beast and the band, including a corporate standards manual. Additionally, they created the marketing campaign to highlight and play on the album's themes of politics, society and propaganda as "a bit of a joke". The album and branding use the Grotesque-based font Maison with a predominantly blue and white-based color palette. From the cover, the barn was condensed into a pentagon used as the branding's logo, subdivided into two squares and triangles implemented within the design and branding, even in the artwork itself, as an allusion to corporate branding.

The marketing campaign was executed in several ways. The band's label, 4AD, partnered with the design company Diabolical to create a mural for the album in Shoreditch, London, containing a lyric from "Day I Die". Four music videos – "The System Only Dreams in Total Darkness", "Guilty Party", "Carin at the Liquor Store" and "Day I Die" – were directed by Casey Reas prior to the album's release, included in video billboard advertisements released in Times Square, London and Copenhagen. Band merchandise included the branding for the album, specifically the pentagon logo.

Elyanna Blaser-Gould, Luke Hayman and Andrew Trabucco-Campos were nominated for Best Recording Package at the 60th Annual Grammy Awards.

== Reception ==
Professional ratings
Aggregate scores
Source	Rating
AnyDecentMusic?	8.2/10
Metacritic	85/100
Review scores
Source	Rating
AllMusic	4/5 stars
The A.V. Club	A
The Guardian	4/5 stars
The Independent	5/5 stars
Mojo	4/5 stars
NME	4/5 stars
Pitchfork	8.0/10
Q	4/5 stars
Rolling Stone	4/5 stars
Vice (Expert Witness)	A−

Sleep Well Beast received widespread acclaim from music critics. On Metacritic, which assigns an average score out of 100 to reviews and ratings from mainstream music critics, the album received an average score of 85 based on 35 reviews, indicating "universal acclaim".

In The Observer, Kitty Empire described Sleep Well Beast as an exponent of "the tension created by the hyper-musical brother duos, pacing the cage of what 'rock band' means with increased vigour. It often adds up to a subtle, grown-up take that still leaves space for drama."

=== Accolades ===
Publication	Accolade	Rank	Ref.
NME	NME's Albums of the Year 2017	13	
RIOT Mag	RIOT's Albums of the Year 2017	3	
Rough Trade	Albums of the Year	14	
Stereogum	50 Best Albums of 2017	32	
Vinyl Me, Please	The 30 Best Albums of 2017	10	
Sputnikmusic	Top 50 Albums of 2017	1	
Grammy Awards	Winner: Best Alternative Music Album Nominated: Best Recording Package	—N/a	
Diffuser.fm	Top 25 Albums of 2017	2	
Yahoo!	Top 10 Albums of 2017	2	
The Sunday Times	100 Best Albums of 2017	5	
Under the Radar	Top 100 Albums of 2017	7	
Uncut	75 Best Albums of 2017	7	
Newsweek	Best Albums of 2017	9	
Q	50 Best Albums of 2017	10	
Rolling Stone	50 Best Albums of 2017	11	
Mojo	Top 50 Albums of 2017	12	
Uproxx	50 Best Albums of 2017	13	
USA Today	10 Favorite Albums of 2017	—N/a	
American Songwriter	Top 25 Albums of 2017	6	

== Track listing ==
All lyrics and melodies written by Matt Berninger and Carin Besser; all music composed by Aaron Dessner and Bryce Dessner; except where noted.

No.	Title	Lyrics	Music	Length
1.	"Nobody Else Will Be There"			4:39
2.	"Day I Die"		A. Dessner, B. Dessner, Scott Devendorf, Bryan Devendorf, Berninger	4:31
3.	"Walk It Back"	Berninger, Besser, Ron Suskind		5:59
4.	"The System Only Dreams in Total Darkness"			3:56
5.	"Born to Beg"			4:22
6.	"Turtleneck"			3:00
7.	"Empire Line"			5:23
8.	"I'll Still Destroy You"			5:15
9.	"Guilty Party"			5:38
10.	"Carin at the Liquor Store"			3:33
11.	"Dark Side of the Gym"			4:50
12.	"Sleep Well Beast"		A. Dessner	6:31
Total length:				57:32

=== Notes ===
- "Walk It Back" includes an excerpt from the article "Faith, Certainty and the Presidency of George W. Bush" by Ron Suskind, first published in The New York Times.

== Personnel ==
The National

- Matt Berninger – vocals, lyrics, melodies, arrangement, performance
- Aaron Dessner – arrangement, performance, drum programming
- Bryce Dessner – arrangement, performance, drum programming
- Bryan Devendorf – drum programming, arrangement, performance
- Scott Devendorf – arrangement, performance

Additional musicians

- Carin Besser – lyrics, melodies
- Maaike van der Linde – additional orchestration (track 12)
- Benjamin Lanz – trombone, synth
- Kyle Resnick – trumpet, flugelhorn, vocals
- Lisa Hannigan – vocals
- Arone Dyer – vocals
- Justin Vernon – synths, vocals
- Andi Toma – keyboards, audio processing
- Jan St. Werner – keyboards, audio processing
- Maaike van der Linde – bass flute, flute
- Romain Bly – horn
- Thomas Bartlett – keyboards
- Jason Treuting – drums, percussion
- Eric Cha-Beach – drums, percussion
- Nick Lloyd – organ
- Ryan Olson – audio processing
- Erwan Castex – keyboards, electronic percussion
- Alexander Ridha – electronic percussion
- David Chalmin – drum processing
- James McAlister – drum programming
- Josh Kaufman – guitar
- Katia Labèque – piano
- Walter Martin – Vox Continental Organ
- Benjamin Lanz – touring musician
- Kyle Resnick – touring musician

Paris orchestral sessions ensemble

- Charlotte Juillard – violin
- Domitille Gilon – violin
- Nikolai Spassov – violin
- Marc Desjardins – violin
- Ariadna Teyssier – violin
- Leslie Boulin Raulet – violin
- Matthias Piccin – violin
- Pauline Hauswirth – violin
- Emilie Duch-Sauzeau – violin
- Sarah Chenaf – viola
- Marine Gandon – viola
- Benachir Boukhatem – viola
- Juliette Salmona – cello
- Barbara Le Liepvre – cello
- Ella Jarrige – cello
- Thomas Garoche – basses
- Grégoire Dubruel – basses
- Louise Lapierre – bassoon
- Emma Landarrabilco – flute
- Bastien Nouri – oboe
- Renaud Guy–Rousseau – clarinet
- Cédric Bonnet – horn

Production

- Aaron Dessner – production; additional recording
- Bryce Dessner – orchestration, co-production (all tracks)
- Matt Berninger – co-production (tracks 4, 6, 9)
- Peter Katis – additional production (tracks 2, 4); mixing
- Jonathan Low – recording, additional mixing
- David Chalman – recording (Paris orchestral sessions)
- Sean O'Brien – recording (Los Angeles vocal sessions)
- Jan St. Werner – additional recording
- Andi Toma – additional recording
- Greg Calbi – mastering
- Steve Fallone – co-mastering

Artwork

- Graham MacIndoe – album photography
- Luke Hayman – design
- Andrea Trabucco-Campos – design
- Elaynna Blaser-Gould – design

== Charts ==
=== Weekly charts ===
Chart (2017)	Peak position
Australian Albums (ARIA)	2
Austrian Albums (Ö3 Austria)	5
Belgian Albums (Ultratop Flanders)	2
Belgian Albums (Ultratop Wallonia)	8
Canadian Albums (Billboard)	1
Croatian Albums (HDU)	1
Czech Albums (ČNS IFPI)	20
Danish Albums (Hitlisten)	2
Dutch Albums (Album Top 100)	3
Finnish Albums (Suomen virallinen lista)	3
French Albums (SNEP)	11
German Albums (Offizielle Top 100)	4
Irish Albums (IRMA)	1
Italian Albums (FIMI)	13
New Zealand Albums (RMNZ)	2
Norwegian Albums (VG-lista)	8
Polish Albums (ZPAV)	11
Portuguese Albums (AFP)	1
Scottish Albums (OCC)	1
Spanish Albums (PROMUSICAE)	8
Swedish Albums (Sverigetopplistan)	2
Swiss Albums (Schweizer Hitparade)	4
UK Albums (OCC)	1
US Billboard 200	2
US Top Alternative Albums (Billboard)	1
US Top Rock Albums (Billboard)	1

=== Year-end charts ===
Chart (2017)	Position
Belgian Albums (Ultratop Flanders)	32
Belgian Albums (Ultratop Wallonia)	173
US Top Rock Albums (Billboard)	52

Chart (2018)	Position
Belgian Albums (Ultratop Flanders)	101

== Certifications ==
Region	Certification	Certified units/sales
United Kingdom (BPI)	Silver	60,000^{‡}
^{‡} Sales+streaming figures based on certification alone.
