= Scott Devendorf =

- Genres: Indie rock
- Instruments: Bass; guitar; vocals
- Label: 4AD
- Member of: The National; LNZNDRF

Scott Devendorf is an American multi-instrumentalist. He is best known as the bassist for the American indie rock band the National, with whom he has recorded eight studio albums. Devendorf is also a member of the indie rock project LNZNDRF.

== Personal life ==
Devendorf grew up in Cincinnati, Ohio with his brother and The National bandmate, Bryan Devendorf. Prior to performing in The National, Devendorf worked as a graphic designer. Davendorf graduated from Turpin High School in Cincinnati, Ohio in 1991.

== Other projects ==
Outside of his work with The National, Devendorf is involved in a number of other projects. He is a member of LNZNDRF, a collaboration between Devendorf, his brother Bryan Devendorf, and Ben Lanz of Beirut. Their eponymous debut was recorded in a church in Cincinnati and contains eight songs, all of which were improvised and edited down from 30 plus minute jams. The album was released by 4AD on February 19, 2016. On August 5, 2016 the band released Green Roses, a two-track single over 25 minutes.

In 2012, he, Bryan and Aaron Dessner performed with Bob Weir as part of a HeadCount benefit. Devendorf was also involved with Day of the Dead, a charity tribute album to the Grateful Dead released by 4AD on May 20, 2016. The compilation is a wide-ranging tribute to the songwriting and experimentalism of the Dead which took four years to record, features over 60 artists from varied musical backgrounds, 59 tracks and is almost 6 hours long. The album's benefited the Red Hot Organization, a non-profit fighting AIDS. Many of the album's songs feature a house band made up of Scott and Bryan Devendorf, Aaron and Bryce Dessner, Josh Kaufman (who co-produced the project), Conrad Doucette, Sam Cohen, and Walter Martin.

== Discography ==
with The National

- The National (2001)
- Sad Songs for Dirty Lovers (2003)
- Alligator (2005)
- Boxer (2007)
- High Violet (2010)
- Trouble Will Find Me (2013)
- Sleep Well Beast (2017)
- I Am Easy to Find (2019)
- First Two Pages of Frankenstein (2023)

with LNZNDRF

- LNZNDRF (2016)
- Green Roses (2016)
