= The National (band) =

American indie rock band

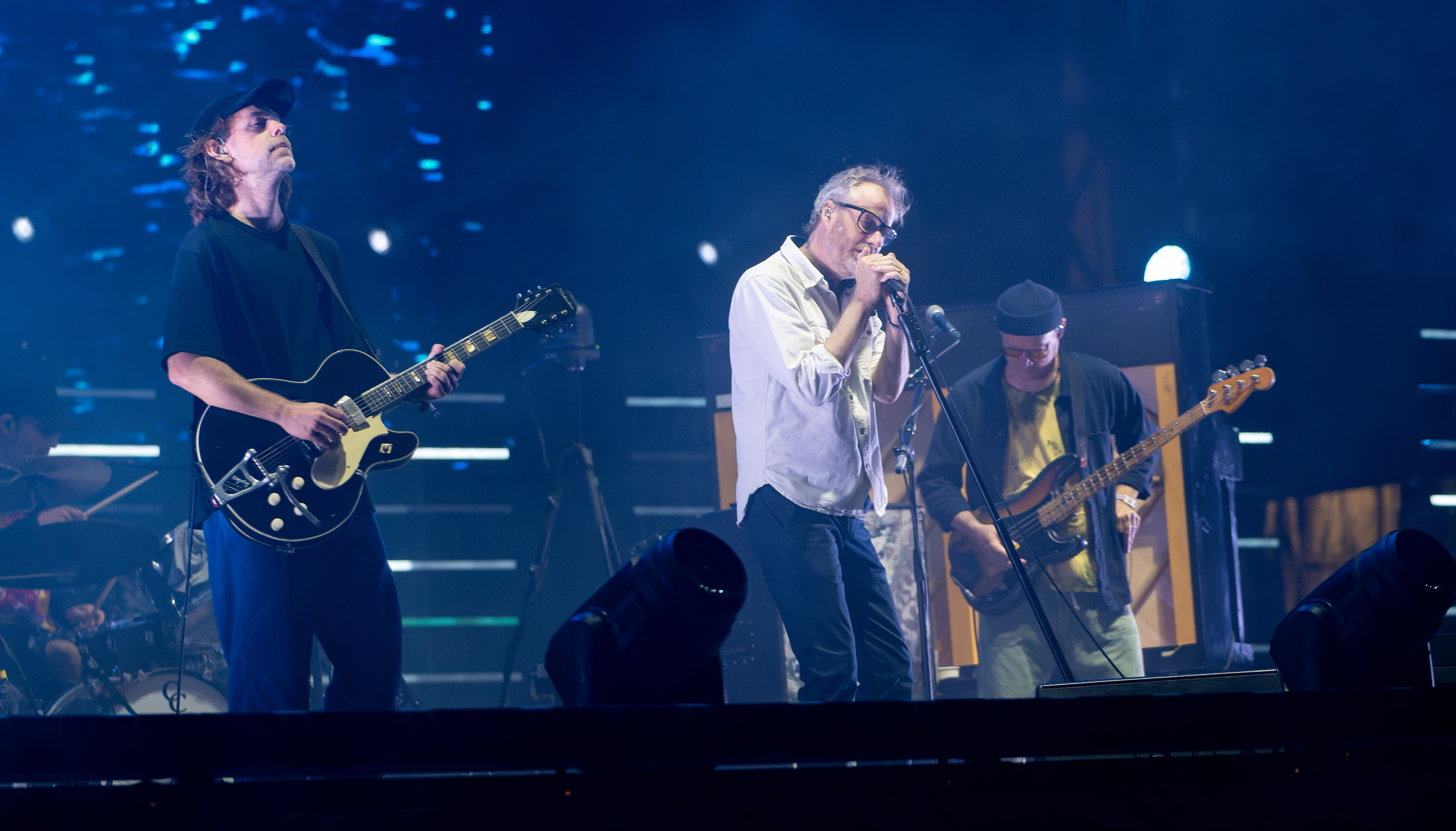
- The National performing at Primavera Sound in 2022

Background information
- Origin: Cincinnati, Ohio, U.S.
- Genres: Indie rock; post-punk revival; art rock
- Years active: 1999–present
- Labels: 4AD; Beggars Banquet; Brassland; Talitres
- Members: Matt Berninger; Aaron Dessner; Bryan Devendorf; Scott Devendorf; Bryce Dessner
- Website: americanmary.com

The National is an American rock band from Cincinnati, Ohio, formed in Brooklyn, New York City, in 1999. The band consists of Matt Berninger (vocals), twin brothers Aaron Dessner (guitar, piano, keyboards) and Bryce Dessner (guitar, piano, keyboards), as well as brothers Scott Devendorf (bass) and Bryan Devendorf (drums). During live performances the band is joined by longtime touring members Ben Lanz (trombone, synthesizers) and Kyle Resnick (trumpet, keyboards, backing vocals). Berninger's wife, Carin Besser, has written lyrics for the band alongside her husband since its 2007 album Boxer.

Founded by Matt Berninger, Aaron Dessner, Scott Devendorf and Bryan Devendorf, the National released their self-titled debut album, The National (2001), on Brassland Records, an independent record label founded by Aaron, his twin brother, Bryce Dessner, and Alec Hanley Bemis. Bryce, who had assisted in recording the album, soon joined the band, participating as a full member in the recording of its follow-up, Sad Songs for Dirty Lovers (2003).

Leaving behind their day jobs, the National signed with Beggars Banquet Records and released their third studio album, Alligator (2005), to widespread critical acclaim. The band's fourth and fifth studio albums, Boxer (2007) and High Violet (2010), increased their exposure significantly. In 2013, the band released its sixth studio album, Trouble Will Find Me, which was nominated for a Grammy Award. In 2017, the band released the album Sleep Well Beast, which won the band a Grammy Award. Their eighth studio album, I Am Easy to Find, was released in 2019. Their ninth studio album, First Two Pages of Frankenstein, was released on April 28, 2023, and featured appearances from Sufjan Stevens, Taylor Swift, and Phoebe Bridgers. It reached No. 1 on the Billboard charts in the AAA & Rock categories. The band released a surprise album, Laugh Track, on September 18, 2023. It was mostly written and recorded alongside their earlier 2023 album.

Four of the band's albums were nominated by writer Laura Snapes for inclusion on NME's 2013 list of the NME's The 500 Greatest Albums of All Time.

== History ==
=== 1991–2006: Formation and early years ===
Matt Berninger and Scott Devendorf met in 1991 while attending the University of Cincinnati College of Design, Architecture, Art, and Planning (DAAP) graphic design program, where they also met Mike Brewer, Casey Reas, and Jeff Salem. Together, the five of them formed the lo-fi garage band Nancy, named after Berninger's mother, aspiring to sound like Pavement. The band was together for five years, and released one album, Ruther 3429, on Wife Records before breaking up after Berninger, Devendorf, Reas and Salem moved to Brooklyn. Bryan, Bryce, and Aaron were childhood friends who played in several bands together over the years. When their last effort, Project Nim, broke up in 1998, they joined Matt and Scott in Brooklyn by way of the Devendorf relationship.

When the band was formed in 1999, it was called "The National", although the domain name of the band's website is americanmary.com because, according to Matt Berninger, "it's a song off our first record. We never thought of changing the (website) name, although we should have." Several of the members continued to work day jobs, including being involved in New York's dot-com boom, while performing free Sunday night shows regularly at Lower East Side venue Luna Lounge. Their first album, The National, was eventually released in 2001 on Brassland Records, a label founded by band members Aaron and Bryce Dessner, along with their friend Alec Hanley Bemis. When reviewing the album, Jason MacNeil of No Depression wrote, "...The National has created nearly a dozen picture-perfect Americana bar-soaked gems with its debut album. From the opening notes of 'Beautiful Head', the delicate line between polished roots-oriented pop and alt-country has rarely been walked so deliberately with the payoff so favorable."

The National's second album, Sad Songs for Dirty Lovers, released in 2003, was the band's first collaboration with record producers Paul Heck and Peter Katis, who would later also produce the band's albums Alligator and Boxer. After the French release of the album on the French label Talitres, DJ Bernard Lenoir invited them to perform on his Black Sessions twice on France Inter. Publications such as Uncut and the Chicago Tribune named it the album of the year. In 2004, they released the Cherry Tree EP. The EP featured "All the Wine", a song that would appear on their next record. The release of the EP garnered further success and landed them on a successful tour with The Walkmen. In the same year, the band quit their day jobs and signed to a new label, Beggars Banquet Records, because the process of running their own label was becoming "too complicated".

Their first album on Beggars Banquet, Alligator, was released in 2005. The album was met with much critical acclaim and featured highly in "Album of the Year" charts in the Los Angeles Times, Insound, Uncut, and many other publications. The album allowed the band increased exposure. NME and Pitchfork ranked Alligator as a top album of the 2000s. Alligator brought the band increased attendance at concerts, including sold-out shows at The Troubadour in Los Angeles and Webster Hall in New York. They also played at numerous festivals including the 2006 Pitchfork Music Festival, Reading and Leeds Festivals, Pukkelpop, and more.

=== 2007–2009: Boxer; A Skin, a Night and The Virginia EP ===
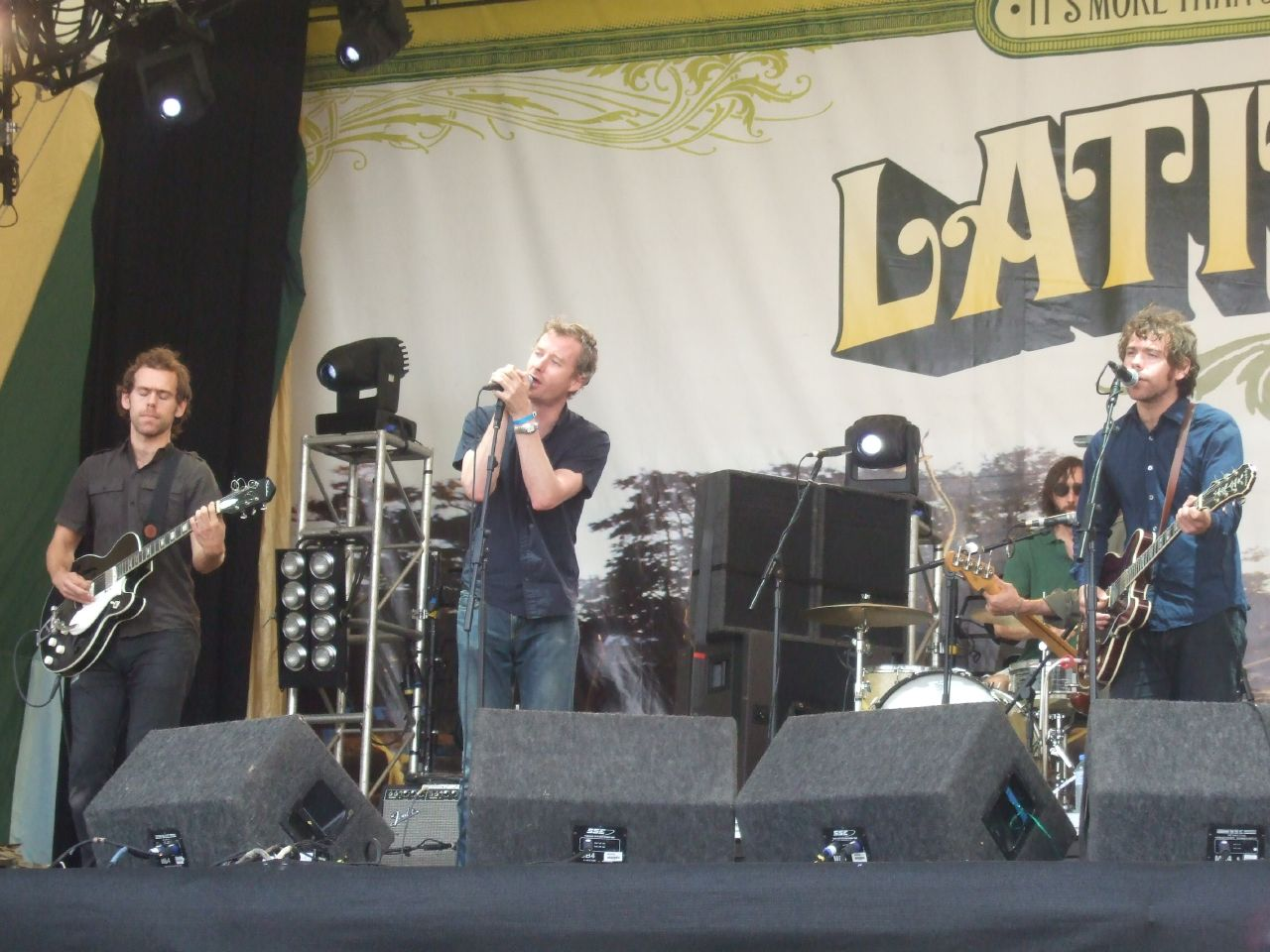
The National performing at Latitude Festival in July 2007

Their fourth album, Boxer, was released on May 22, 2007, and also received widespread critical praise. The album features contributions from various guest artists, including Sufjan Stevens and Doveman. It was voted the No. 2 best album of the year by Stereogum.com and the No. 1 album of the year by Paste. The song "Slow Show" from Boxer was featured on the NBC series Chuck and Parenthood, as well as on The CW's One Tree Hill in its fifth season. The song "Start a War" was featured on the series Defying Gravity, Brothers and Sisters, House, Parenthood, Friday Night Lights, as well as the film Warrior. The track "Fake Empire" was featured in the Season 2 Premiere of the HBO series Hung, also on the 9th episode, season 5 of "Person of interest", and on the third episode of the second season of Chuck and in the pilot episode of Southland. An instrumental version of the song was featured in Barack Obama's campaign video "Signs of Hope and Change" during his 2008 United States presidential campaign, and the song was also played at the 2008 Democratic National Convention. Boxer made numerous "album of the decade" lists, including Pitchfork, Aquarium Drunkard, Paste, and more.

On September 26, 2007, the band performed "Apartment Story" on The Late Late Show with Craig Ferguson. In 2008, along with Modest Mouse, they opened for R.E.M. on the promotional tour for the R.E.M. album Accelerate. That summer they played many festivals in North America and Europe, including Coachella, Roskilde, Sasquatch, Glastonbury, Haldern Pop, Rock Werchter, Optimus Alive!, Oxegen, Benicàssim, Lowlands, O2 Wireless, T in the Park, All Points West, and Lollapalooza.

In May 2008, the band released their first feature-length documentary film titled A Skin, a Night on DVD. The film, directed by filmmaker Vincent Moon, documents the lives of the band surrounding the recording of Boxer and just before a show at the London venue Koko. Along with the release of the DVD was a CD collection of B-sides and rarities titled The Virginia EP. The National's collaboration with Vincent Moon began long before the filming of A Skin, a Night. Vincent Moon discovered the band after the release of their first album and became friends with its members after a show at Paris' La Guinguette Pirate. Soon after this meeting, Moon filmed his first music videos ever, which were for the National's songs "Daughters of the Soho Riots" and "Lit Up". Moon's photography also appears on the cover for Alligator.

On February 17, 2009, a compilation album titled Dark Was the Night was produced by Aaron and Bryce Dessner and released by 4AD (the band's new label after Beggars Banquet Records merged into 4AD). The two-disc, 31-track compilation was released for the benefit of the Red Hot Organization, and featured a new song by the National and Nico Muhly titled "So Far Around the Bend". In the same year, the National collaborated with St. Vincent to contribute a cover of Crooked Fingers' "Sleep All Summer" to the Merge Records compilation Score! 20 Years of Merge Records: The Covers!. On May 6, 2009, the National performed "So Far Around the Bend" on Late Night with Jimmy Fallon. The National contributed a track to Ciao My Shining Star: The Songs of Mark Mulcahy in September 2009, an album in support of the former Polaris front-man, who lost his wife. They covered the Polaris track "Ashamed of the Story I Told", from their album Music from The Adventures of Pete & Pete.

=== 2010–2012: High Violet ===
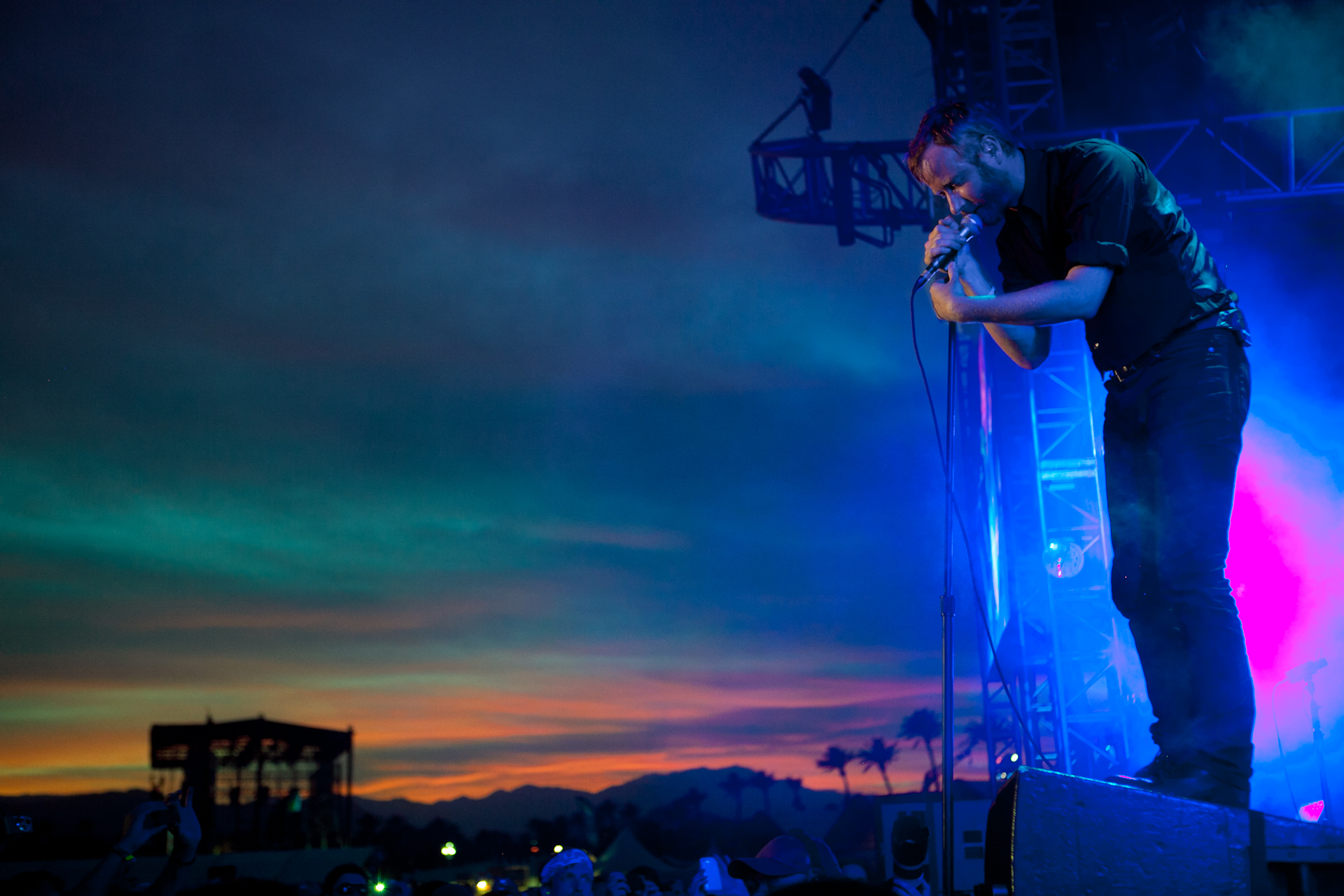
The National performing at the 2011 Coachella Valley Music and Arts Festival

On March 24, the band released "Bloodbuzz Ohio", the first single from their forthcoming album, High Violet, for free download at the official High Violet website. High Violet was released on May 11, 2010, in the U.S. to widespread critical acclaim. The album debuted with first week sales topping charts across the world, ranking No. 3 in the US, No. 2 in Canada, No. 5 in the United Kingdom, and No. 3 in Portugal, among others. High Violet is a Gold Album in Canada, Ireland, Denmark, Belgium, Australia and the United Kingdom. On May 13, 2010, the band appeared on the Late Show with David Letterman, performing "Afraid of Everyone". On October 25, 2010, they were awarded a Q award, presented by Bernard Sumner of Joy Division and New Order, for Best Album. In promoting the album, the band made multiple national television appearances and toured globally, including festival appearances at Latitude Festival, Reading and Leeds Festivals, and Sziget Festival.

In 2011 the National was nominated for a Brit Award for International Breakthrough Act and an MTV Performing Woodie. Two of its songs, "Start a War" (from Boxer) and "About Today", were featured in the film Warrior. On March 9, 2011, the National released a music video for Conversation 16 featuring John Slattery, Kristen Schaal and James Urbaniak. Two days later Valve announced the band would be contributing an original song, titled "Exile Vilify", for the video game Portal 2, and on April 12, 2011, the band released "Think You Can Wait" from the soundtrack of the film Win Win.

On April 20, 2011, the National played Starlight Theater in Kansas City, Missouri. During the show, the band played "About Today", and dedicated the song in memory of Gerard Smith of TV on the Radio, who had died earlier that day of lung cancer. On December 8, 2011, the band performed on Q (the CBC radio show) in front of a live audience. Two new songs were performed for the first time: "Rylan" and "I Need My Girl". The third song performed was "Vanderlyle Crybaby Geeks" which featured Justin Vernon of Bon Iver who was also on the show. On March 24, 2012, members of the band, Scott Devendorf, Bryan Devendorf and Aaron Dessner, performed with Bob Weir in a live broadcast concert, The Bridge Session, at Weir's TRI Studios to bring awareness for non-profit organization, HeadCount.

The National recorded "The Rains of Castamere" for the Game of Thrones season 2 episode "Blackwater". They also recorded a cover of the song "I'll See You in My Dreams" for the HBO TV series Boardwalk Empire, and a cover of the "Thanksgiving Song" from the Fox TV series Bob's Burgers. On December 9, 2012, they debuted three new songs "I Should Live in Salt", "Humiliation", and "Graceless" at the All Tomorrow's Parties event in Camber Sands, United Kingdom. The track "Runaway" was used in the 2013 film Warm Bodies.

=== 2013–2016: Trouble Will Find Me and Mistaken for Strangers ===
The band announced their sixth studio album, Trouble Will Find Me, on February 25, 2013. They released the video for "Demons", the album's first single, on April 8. During a Reddit AMA on May 8, they premiered the video for the song "Sea of Love", based on Zvuki Mu's video for Grubiy Zakat. Trouble Will Find Me was released via 4AD Records on May 21, 2013. The album debuted with first week sales topping charts across the world, ranking No. 3 in the US, Canada, and the UK, among others. Following the release, the band embarked on a world tour in support of the album. Trouble Will Find Me earned a Best Alternative Album nomination in the 56th Annual Grammy Awards. Aaron Dessner has described the album as the first one the band "really enjoyed making."

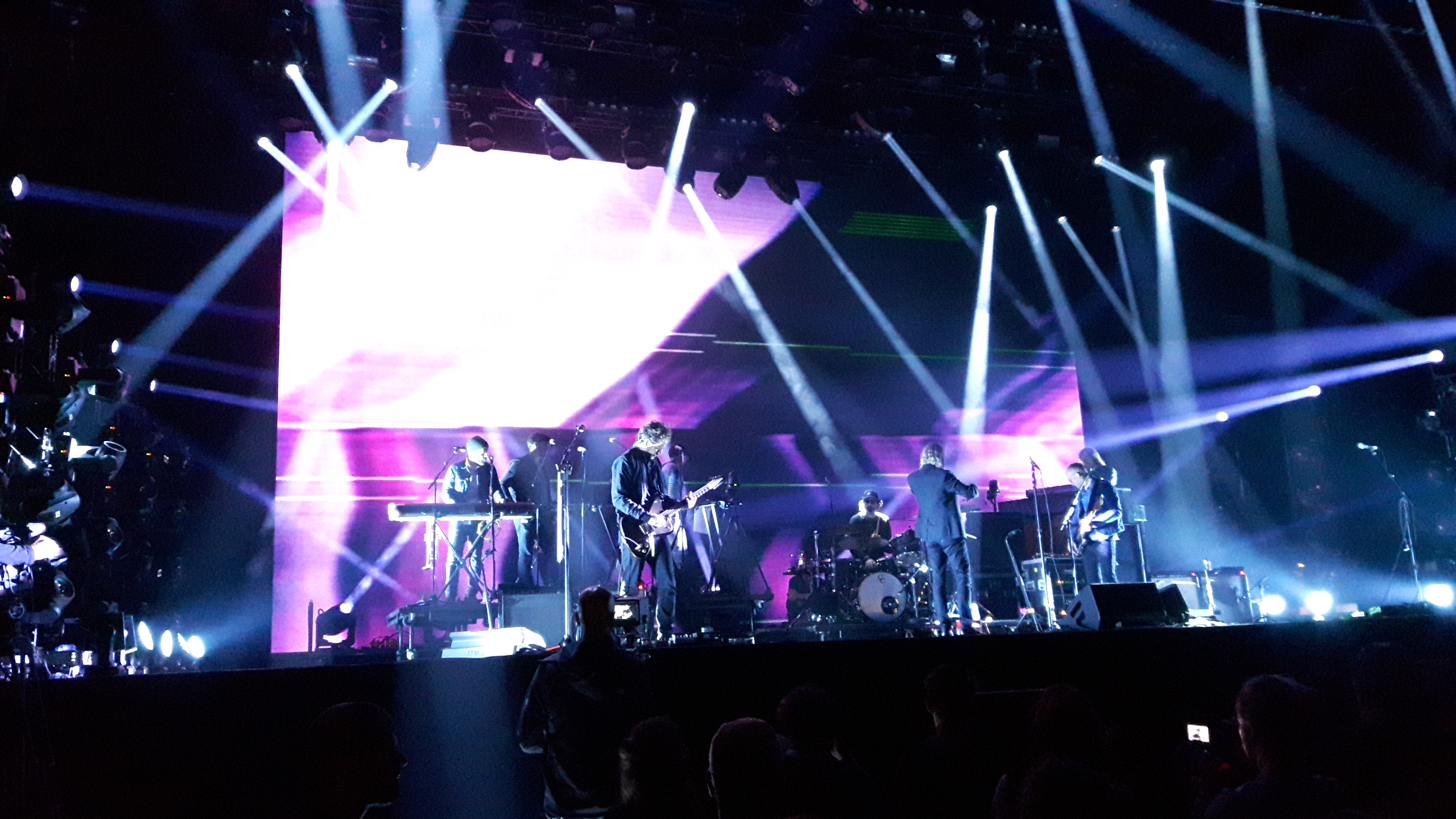
The National performing at Down The Rabbit Hole in June 2016

On February 28, 2013, they announced the upcoming release of a documentary chronicling the lead singer's brother Tom Berninger's journey of touring with the band. The film, titled Mistaken for Strangers, premiered at New York City's Tribeca Film Festival on April 17. Mistaken for Strangers has been described as "a funny, eccentric and finally deeply poignant depiction of art, family, self-sabotage and the prickly intricacies of brotherly love." The film was edited by Carin Besser, a longtime songwriter for the band and Berninger's wife. It had a theatrical release in theaters across the United States and Europe. The band additionally played several festivals in the summer of 2013, including The Boston Calling Music Festival in May 2013. That same year, they contributed the song "Lean" to the soundtrack for the film The Hunger Games: Catching Fire.

Promotion for Trouble Will Find Me included the band making their debut performance on Saturday Night Live, as well as several festival appearances, including headlining The Boston Calling Music Festival and Bonaroo. The band performed "Graceless" and "I Need My Girl" on the March 8, 2014 episode of Saturday Night Live. Several of their songs were used on television, including "Fireproof", "Hard to Find" and "England". In an interview published in June 2014, Berninger stated that the National would try a new approach to writing and recording an album, with plans to start in October 2014. On April 2, 2015, the National released the single "Sunshine On My Back". The song is provided as a free download for renting or buying Mistaken for Strangers at its official website. The song comes from the Trouble Will Find Me recording sessions and features Sharon van Etten. The band headlined a handful of festivals during 2015, including Eaux Claires, a music festival held in Eau Claire, Wisconsin curated by Bon Iver front-man Justin Vernon and the National's Aaron Dessner. They also headlined Treasure Island Music Festival. In his review of the festival, Consequence of Sound's Zack Ruskin described the band's performance as "a masterclass in a band that has fully come into their own" and wrote that it "proved once again why they are one of the most exceptional and impressive rock bands of our time."

On October 16, 2015, the band debuted a new song called "Roman Candle" (which would later be released as "Walk It Back" on Sleep Well Beast) at Troubadour in Los Angeles. In an interview published in November 2015, Berninger expressed the band's desire to play their new songs in a live setting before recording them: "Over the summer of 2016 we're going to do a lot of shows with the new stuff and then record the next National album." On March 2, 2016, it was announced that the band was to headline Latitude Festival in the United Kingdom. In August 2016, Berninger indicated that the new album had electronic influences while they premiered the song "Prom Song 13th Century (Frankie & Johnny)" featuring St. Vincent.

=== 2017–2019: Sleep Well Beast, I Am Easy to Find, and Grammy win ===
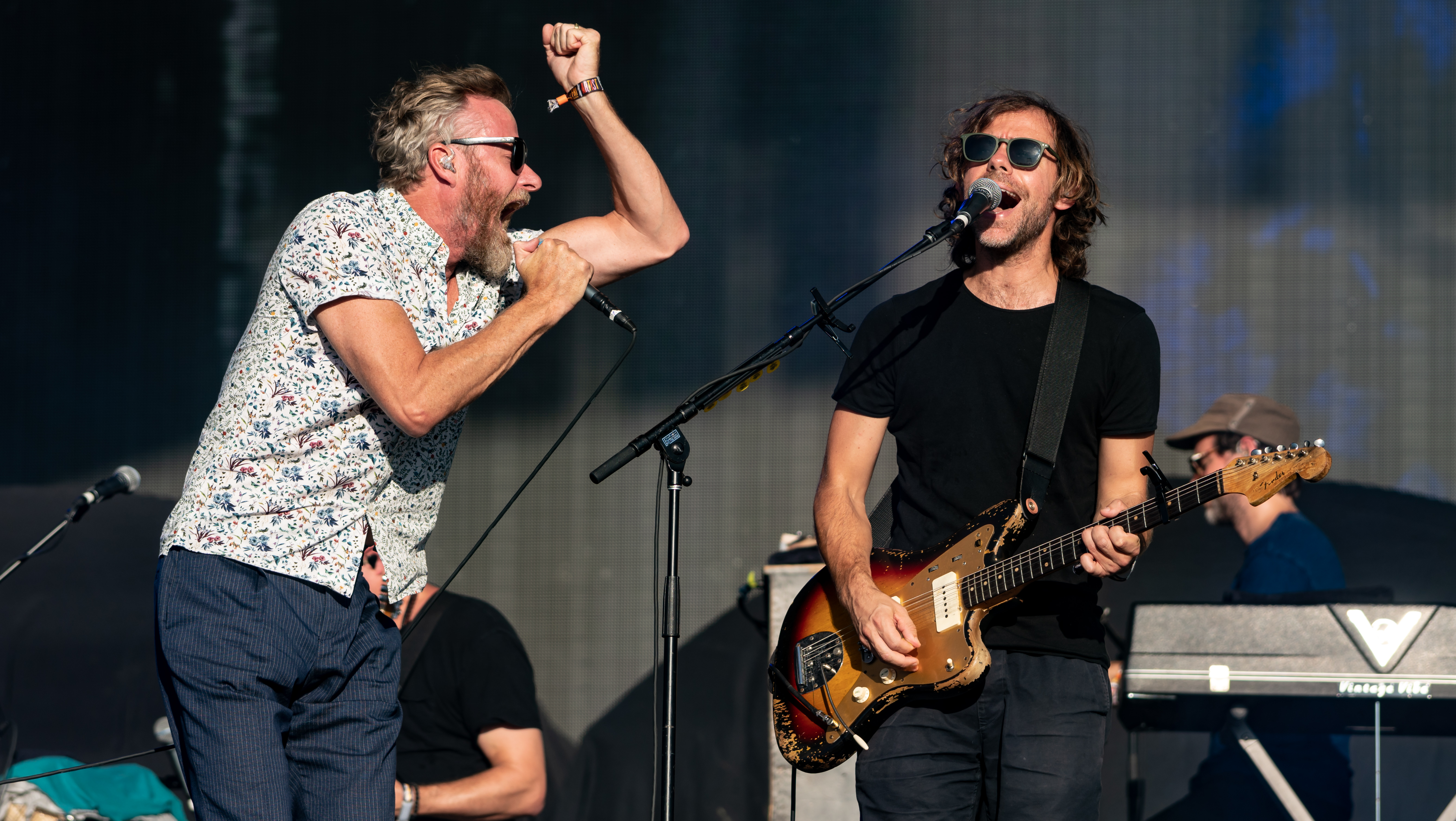
The National performing at Austin City Limits Music Festival in October 2018

On May 11, 2017, the single "The System Only Dreams in Total Darkness" was released after two days of mysterious teasers. At the same time, a new album was announced, titled Sleep Well Beast, which was released September 8, 2017. The album's second single, "Guilty Party" was released on June 28, 2017. The band released "Carin at the Liquor Store", the third single from the album, on August 8, 2017. On August 29, 2017, they released the fourth single, "Day I Die". Matt Berninger has said he and Carin Besser wrote much of Sleep Well Beast about the challenges of their own marriage. The album was also heavily influenced by the 2016 United States presidential election.

The band scheduled a worldwide tour in support of the album, which began in September 2017. In August 2017, "The System Only Dreams in Total Darkness" became the band's first song to reach number one on a Billboard songs chart, reaching number one on the Adult Alternative Songs chart. On November 28, 2017, the album was nominated for two Grammy Awards: for Best Alternative Music Album and Best Recording Package, later winning the Grammy for Best Alternative Music Album, which bassist Scott Devendorf accepted on behalf of the band. While on tour to support the album, the National performed new music during a performance in Zagreb, Croatia. The band wrote the music for the 2018 musical Cyrano by Erica Schmidt, an adaptation of the 1896 play Cyrano de Bergerac by Edmond Rostand, which starred Schmidt's husband Peter Dinklage in the lead role. Like most of the National's music, the songs for Cyrano all have lyrics by Besser and Berninger, and music by the Dessner brothers.

On March 5, 2019, in an interview with Indie88 in Toronto, Aaron Dessner confirmed the band's new album would be called I Am Easy to Find, and was scheduled for release on May 17. He also debuted the album's first single "You Had Your Soul with You". The band also announced a Mike Mills-directed short film of the same name starring Alicia Vikander, which uses different arrangements of songs from the album as its soundtrack. On April 4, 2019, the band released their second single and closing song off I Am Easy to Find titled "Light Years", accompanied by a music video starring Alicia Vikander. On May 1, 2019, the band released their third single from I Am Easy to Find titled "Hairpin Turns", accompanied by a music video. The band released a cassette box set titled Juicy Sonic Magic for Record Store Day Black Friday on November 29, 2019, which featured their set at the Hearst Greek Theatre in Berkeley, California in September 2018.

=== 2020–2024: First Two Pages of Frankenstein and Laugh Track ===
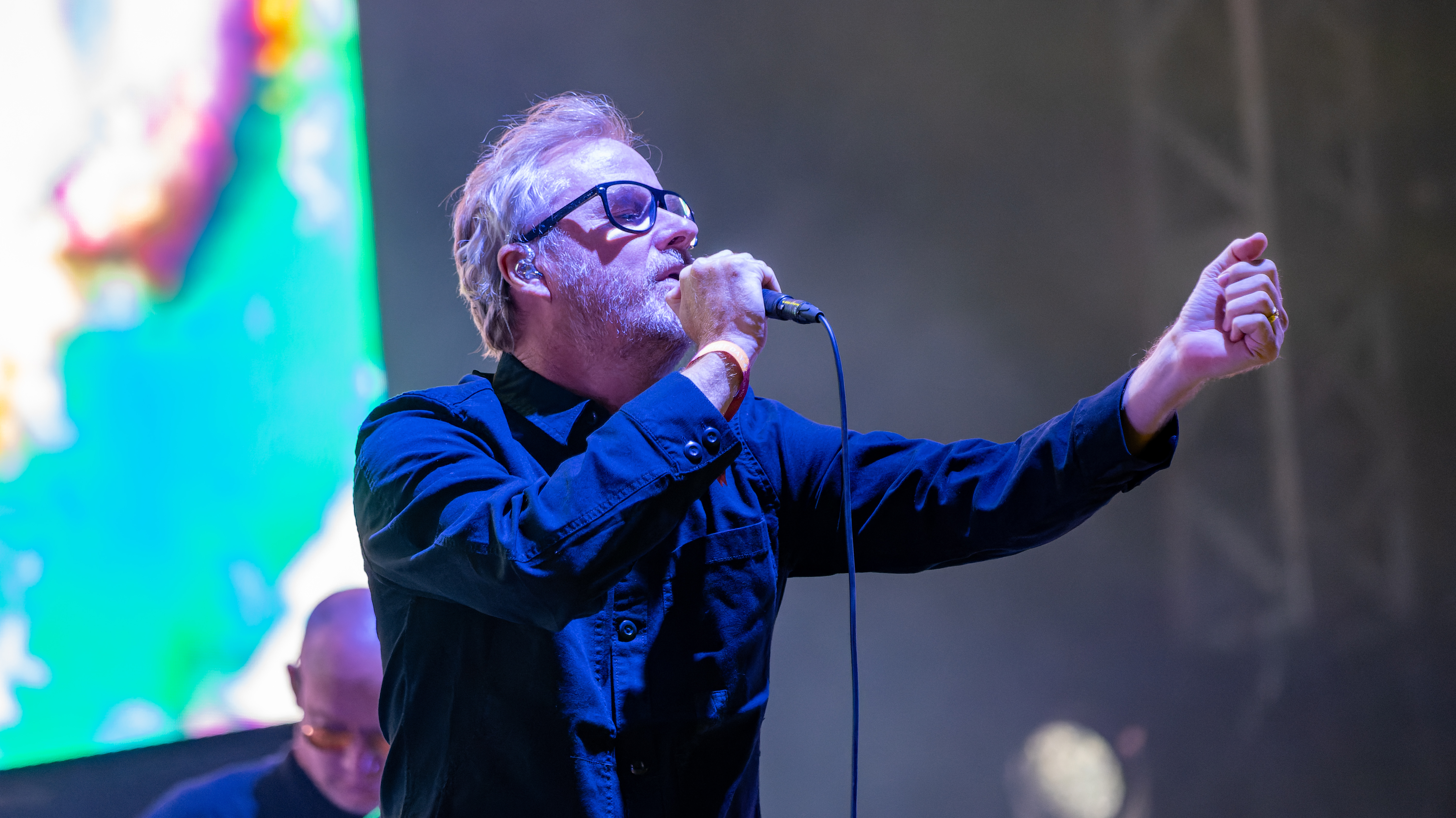
Berninger during a performance by the National at All Points East in August 2022

The National's final show before the COVID-19 pandemic was on December 12, 2019, at Campo Pequeno in Lisbon, Portugal. In 2020, the band contributed to Taylor Swift's ninth studio album, Evermore, appearing alongside Swift on the song "Coney Island". The album was co-produced by Aaron Dessner and Bryce Dessner (the former of whom also co-produced Swift's eighth studio album Folklore). In 2021, Cyrano was adapted as a film musical, also called Cyrano, again starring Dinklage. For the film, Aaron and Bryce Dessner composed an instrumental score separate from the film's songs. The band also wrote two new songs for the film: "Every Letter", which is sung in the film by Haley Bennett, and "Somebody Desperate", which is performed by the National themselves over the end credits.

After the COVID-19 pandemic, the band returned to touring and live performance in May 2022, playing their first show in two and a half years at Baluarte in Pamplona, Spain on May 28, 2022. At the show, the band performed three new songs: "Grease in Your Hair (Birdie)", "Tropic Morning News (Haversham)" and "Weird Goodbyes" – then known as "Bathwater (Mount Auburn)". A fourth new song, "Ice Machines", was premiered in Paris; a fifth, "Space Invader (Threaded Gold)", was performed during the band's set at the Newport Folk Festival in July. In August 2022, Bryce Dessner said that the band was "discovering things" about their new material "in real time" by playing it every night.

What I can say is that we're at a high watermark in terms of our creativity as a band. There's a lot happening, and a lot of music. We're allowing ourselves to dream about it, take risks, try things and give the songs time to develop. It's starting to become something we're really excited about. It's hard to say what shape it will take, but there's a ton there.

On August 22, 2022, the National released "Weird Goodbyes" as their first single in three years. The studio version of the song features Bon Iver, as well as strings performed by the London Contemporary Orchestra. In January 2023, the band started to share teases of a forthcoming announcement – including a password-protected passage from Frankenstein shared on their website, edited to include references to Swift, Phoebe Bridgers, and Sufjan Stevens. A week later, the band officially announced their ninth studio album, First Two Pages of Frankenstein, which was released on April 28. The news came with the release of its first single, "Tropic Morning News". Bridgers, Swift and Stevens were also confirmed to feature on the album, as were the previously performed songs "Grease in Your Hair" and "Ice Machines". Two singles, "Space Invader" and "Alphabet City", were released on August 17, 2023. They were later included on the surprise album Laugh Track, which was announced three days before its release at Homecoming Festival in Cincinnati, Ohio, on September 15, 2023. A live double album titled Rome, recorded at the Auditorium Parco della Musica, was released on December 13, 2024.

=== 2024–present: Eleventh studio album ===
Regarding a potential eleventh studio album, the band confirmed in November 2024 that they had been writing new, improvised material during their 2024 tour, in a similar style to "Smoke Detector", the near-eight-minute closing track to Laugh Track, which was created during a soundcheck on tour. The band expressed their desire to make their eleventh album "loose and improvised", with Scott Devendorf noting: "I think it inspires Matt to write. He's the one that's been pushing hard for these soundcheck jams."

== Tours and appearances ==
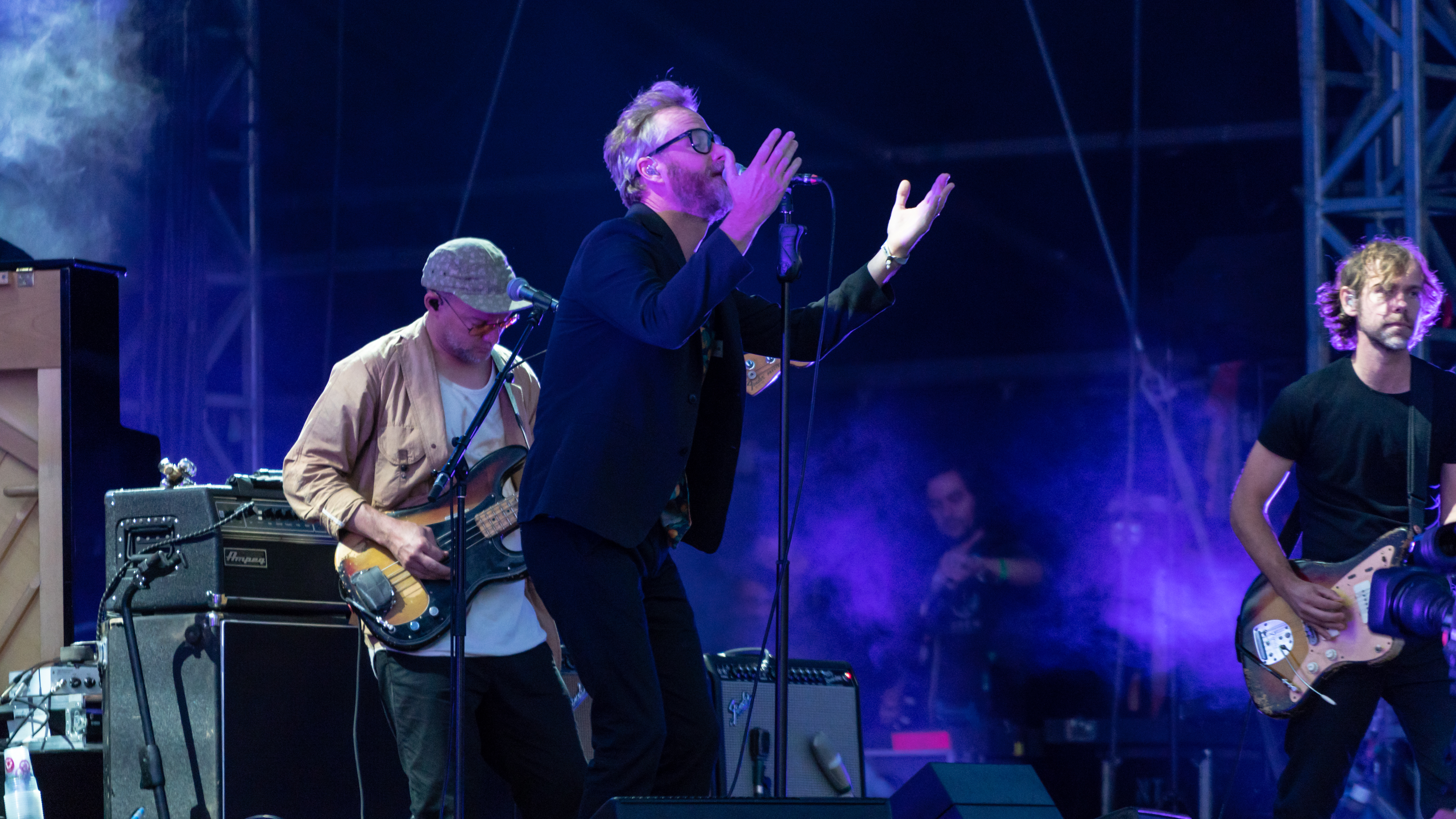
The National performing at All Points East in 2018

The National has released ten studio albums, six live albums, and two extended plays since their debut in 1999. This has resulted in 21 concert tours, and several television, radio, and online performances. Since their debut, they have played festivals like Coachella, Lollapalooza, and Bonnaroo in the United States and Glastonbury Festival, Roskilde Festival and Primavera Sound abroad, promoting their albums and testing unreleased music.

In the bands early years, they toured as supporting acts for bands like The Walkmen and Pavement. Their debut radio performance was on France Inter's Black Sessions with radio presenter, DJ Bernard Lenoir in 2005. After the release of their acclaimed third studio album, Alligator, the band sold out both The Troubadour in Los Angeles and Webster Hall in New York. The success of Alligator also brought on their debut at festivals, including Pitchfork Music Festival, Reading and Leeds Festivals, and Pukkelpop.

As the National gained popularity, they began appearing on national and internationally televised stages. In 2007, while promoting Boxer, the band performed "Apartment Story" on The Late Late Show with Craig Ferguson. In 2010, while promoting their compilation album Dark Was the Night the band performed "Terrible Love", the lead track from High Violet, on Late Night with Jimmy Fallon. That same year, they appeared on the Late Show with David Letterman, performing "Afraid of Everyone." The National's debut performance on Saturday Night Live was in 2014, performing "Graceless" and "I Need My Girl" with host Lena Dunham.

Since their debut in the late 1990s, The National has performed at venues such as Madison Square Garden, The O2 Arena, and Alexandra Palace, on national and international television broadcasts such as Jools Holland, and numerous festivals around the world. In 2024, the band played at Glastonbury on the 'Other Stage' and at the Lake Stage at the Montreux Jazz Festival.

=== Concert tours ===
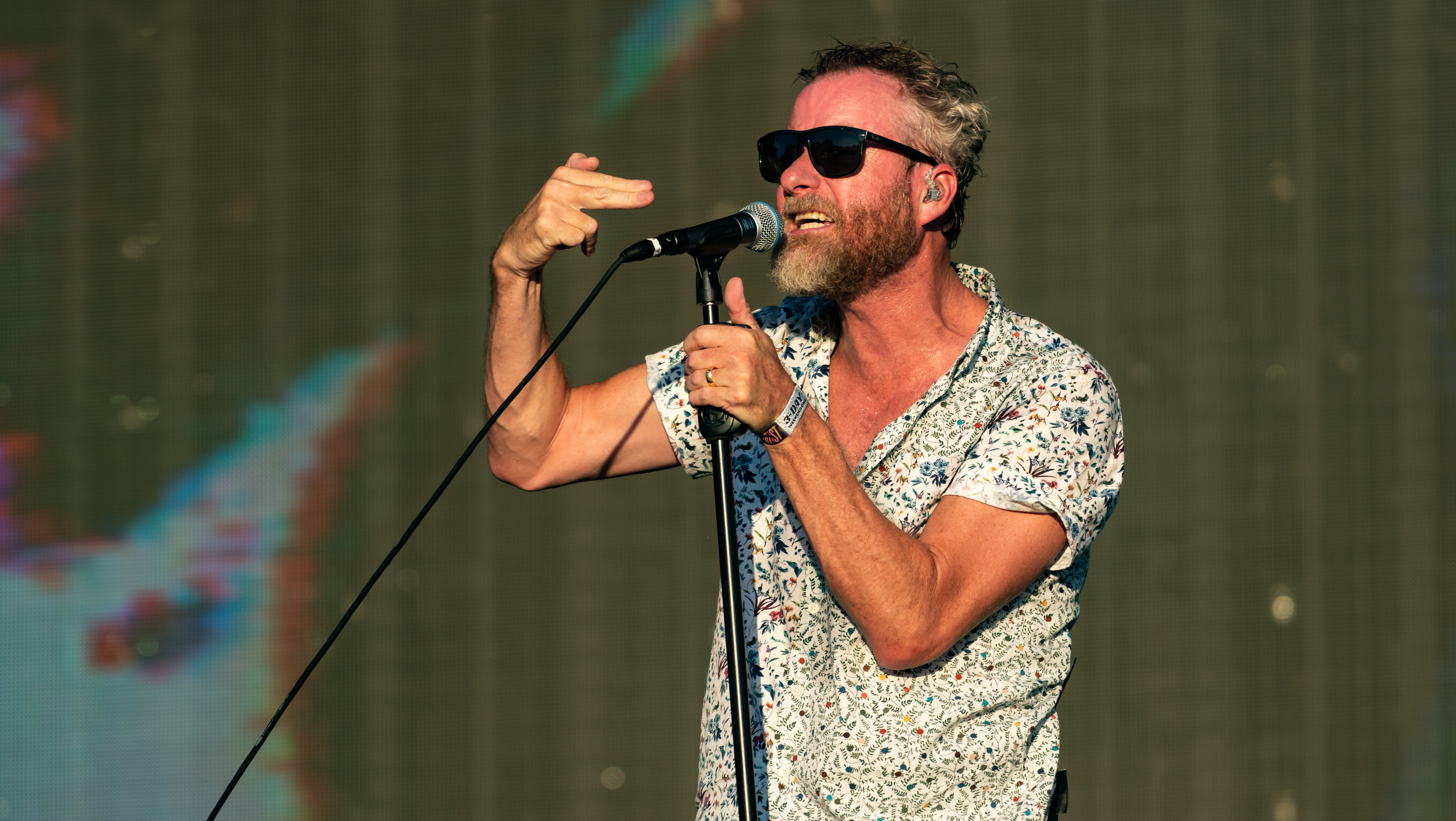
Berninger during a performance at Austin City Limits Music Festival in 2018

Headlining

- Alligator Tour (2005)
- Boxer Tour (2007–2008)
- High Violet Tour (2010–2011)
- Forward Tour (2012)
- Trouble Will Find Me Tour (2013–2014)
- Sleep Well Beast Tour (2017–2018)
- A Special Evening with The National Tour (2019)
- I Am Easy to Find Tour (2019)
- Summer 2022 Tour (2022)
- First Two Pages of Frankenstein Tour (2023–2024)

Supporting

- The Walkmen – Bows + Arrows Tour (2005)

== Origin of the band name ==
Regarding the band name, the National, Matt Berninger explained in a 2007 interview:

When anyone's coming up with a band name, it was one of those things. We were trying to find a name that didn't mean anything. That was sort of devoid of any kind of interpretation and wasn't overly clever. It's just very simple. And that was the simplest thing we could think of just because it is so... You can't walk down the street without seeing the words "The National" something or other somewhere. So it was benign and meaningless; that's kind of why we picked it. Although that backfired a little bit because we went to Europe—we probably should have thought of this ahead of time—but nationalism has a very right-wing connotation, especially in Germany, France and ... the Nationalists and the National Front and all that kind of stuff. So in Germany, we actually had some shows boycotted because they thought we were in someway affiliated with the right-wing conservative neo-Nazi party, which we had to do some press to make sure people realized that we were not associated with the Nazis. The band name, it's kind of funny, when we started out, we would probably name it something else, but we're stuck with it, and I'm happy with it.

— Matt Berninger in The Scenestar Interview: Matt Berninger of The National

== Musical style ==
Aaron and Bryce Dessner write and develop the music which Matt Berninger then responds to, building lyrics on the music Aaron and Bryce have written. Berninger has said that the melody and the rhythm come first and then words and imagery will start to stick to a melody, stating, "I never sit and fill a journal with lyrics." Kitty Empire in The Guardian characterized the band as exploring "literate rock that presents at first as artily sombre, and eventually as one of the most nuanced 21st-century iterations of what used to be known as college rock".

The National has been compared to Joy Division, Leonard Cohen, Interpol, Wilco, Depeche Mode, Radiohead, and Nick Cave & the Bad Seeds. The band's lyrics have been described as "dark, melancholy and difficult to interpret."

== Members ==
- Matt Berninger – lead vocals (1999–present)
- Aaron Dessner – guitar, bass, piano, keyboards, harmonica, mandola, backing vocals (1999–present)
- Bryan Devendorf – drums, percussion, backing vocals (1999–present)
- Scott Devendorf – bass, guitar, backing vocals (1999–present)
- Bryce Dessner – guitar, keyboards, piano, backing vocals (2001–present)

Touring musicians

- Ben Lanz – trombone, synthesizers (2007–present)
- Kyle Resnick – trumpet, keyboards, backing vocals (2007–present)

Former touring musicians

- James McAlister – percussion, drums (2019)
- Padma Newsome – viola, orchestration (2003–2009)

== Discography ==
- The National (2001)
- Sad Songs for Dirty Lovers (2003)
- Alligator (2005)
- Boxer (2007)
- High Violet (2010)
- Trouble Will Find Me (2013)
- Sleep Well Beast (2017)
- I Am Easy to Find (2019)
- First Two Pages of Frankenstein (2023)
- Laugh Track (2023)

== Other ventures ==
As individual artists, the National has embarked on several musical projects outside of their work together as a band.

In 2009, Aaron Dessner collaborated with Justin Vernon, lead singer of indie folk band Bon Iver on the song "Big Red Machine," which was featured on the Dark Was the Night compilation album benefiting the Red Hot Organization. That same year the duo officially formed a band of the same name, Big Red Machine. Aaron has also produced music for Ed Sheeran, Michael Stipe, Gracie Abrams, Frightened Rabbit, Ben Howard, and Taylor Swift's album Folklore, which he won a Grammy for Album of the Year in 2021.

In 2018, Bryce Dessner's collaboration with pianists Katia and Marielle Labèque formalized into the group, Dream House Quartet, with the addition of guitarist and composer David Chalmin of La Terre Invisible. Dessner is a producer and composer, having worked with Philip Glass, Steve Reich, Alejandro Iñarritú, Paul Simon, Sufjan Stevens, Caroline Shaw, and Taylor Swift.

Bryan Devendorf released his debut solo album, Royal Green, in 2020. Prior to his solo project he released albums with Pfarmers, a supergroup consisting of himself, Danny Seim of Menomena and Lackthereof, and Dave Nelson of Sufjan Stevens and St. Vincent. Pfarmers released the albums Gunnera in 2015 and Our Puram in 2016. Devendorf also released projects with his brother Scott, Ben Lanz, and Aaron Arntz in the group LNZNDRF.

Matt Berninger has released two solo albums, Serpentine Prison, in 2020, and Get Sunk, in 2025. He previously formed a duo with Brent Knopf of Ramona Falls and Menomena, called EL VY. EL VY released the album Return to the Moon in 2015.

In addition to his work in LNZNDRF, Scott Devendorf is a part of the DJ duo group DJead Night with Conrad Doucette. DJead Night's shows often feature live art from Michael and Dan Goodwin.

== Charity ==
=== Political support ===
The National supported both of Barack Obama's presidential candidacies in 2008 and 2012. In July 2008, the band designed and sold a T-shirt featuring Obama's image above the words "Mr. November," a reference to both their song from Alligator and the month of the U.S. presidential election. All proceeds were donated to Obama's campaign. On October 16, 2008, the band played a rally for Barack Obama on Fountain Square in their hometown of Cincinnati with The Breeders. Buses for early voting were available before the show to take voters to the Hamilton County Board of Elections.

On September 28, 2010, the National played in front of over 25,000 people before a speech by President Obama at a rally in Madison, Wisconsin. On September 1, 2012, the band opened for the President at a campaign rally in Urbandale, Iowa in front of a crowd in excess of 10,000 people. In October, the band traveled to Ohio where they played two free shows and visited university campuses as part of Barack Obama's GottaVote campaign to encourage young adults to register to vote and to cast their vote for Obama.

In November 2016, the National played a concert for presidential candidate Hillary Clinton.

=== Humanitarian support ===
==== 2008 Safe Space NYC ====
In 2008 the band designed a T-shirt for the Yellow Bird Project to raise money for Safe Space NYC, an organization which provides safe refuge for underprivileged children and families in Southeast Queens.

==== Dark Was the Night ====
On February 17, 2009, Dark Was the Night, the twentieth Red Hot Organization compilation, was released. Curated by Aaron and Bryce Dessner, this album comprised songs by bands and artists such as Arcade Fire, Grizzly Bear, Beirut, David Byrne, Sufjan Stevens, Spoon, The Dirty Projectors, Feist and the National, among others. Over one million dollars of the proceeds from album sales were donated to the Red Hot Organization, an international organization dedicated to fighting AIDS.

On May 3, 2009, Aaron and Bryce Dessner curated a concert for Dark Was the Night at Radio City Music Hall in New York City. Other than the band, performers included David Byrne, The Dirty Projectors, Feist, and several other artists who contributed to the compilation. Red Hot Organization founder and director, John Carlin, was quoted as saying, "Dark Was the Night encapsulated the spirit and creativity of a new generation of musicians whose work struck a chord and got people to actually purchase the album and raise hundreds of thousands of dollars to fight AIDS."

==== 2013/2014 Trouble Will Find Me Tour ====
The National have supported Partners in Health throughout the Trouble Will Find Me Tour by working with Plus One to donate $1 from ticket sales at select shows to raise money for Partners in Health.

==== Day of the Dead ====
On March 17, 2016, the band announced Day of the Dead, a Red Hot Organization charity tribute album to the Grateful Dead released on May 20, 2016. Day of the Dead was created, curated and produced by Aaron and Bryce. The compilation, which took four years to record, is a wide-ranging tribute to the songwriting and experimentalism of the band, and features over 60 artists from varied musical backgrounds. It has 59 tracks and is almost 6 hours long. All profits will help fight for AIDS/ HIV and related health issues around the world through the Red Hot Organization. Day of the Dead is the follow-up to 2009's Dark Was The Night (4AD), a 32-track, multi-artist compilation also produced by Aaron and Bryce for Red Hot.

Day of the Dead features collaborations and recordings from a diverse group of artists including Wilco, Flaming Lips, Bruce Hornsby, Justin Vernon, the National, The War on Drugs, Kurt Vile, Lee Ranaldo of Sonic Youth, Ira Kaplan of Yo La Tengo, Jenny Lewis, Lucius, The Tallest Man on Earth, Unknown Mortal Orchestra, Perfume Genius, Jim James of My Morning Jacket, Senegalese collective Orchestra Baobab, composer Terry Riley and his son Gyan Riley, electronic artist Tim Hecker, So Percussion, jazz pianist Vijay Iyer and Bela Fleck.

Of the 59 tracks on the compilation, many feature a house band made up of Aaron, Bryce, brothers Scott and Bryan Devendorf, Josh Kaufman (who co-produced the project), Conrad Doucette (of Takka Takka), Sam Cohen and Walter Martin. The National have three tracks on the album: "Peggy-O", "Morning Dew" and "I Know You Rider".

A Day of the Dead live performance took place in August 2016 at the second Eaux Claires Festival, featuring the band as well as Jenny Lewis, Matthew Houck, Lucius, Will Oldham, Sam Amidon, Richard Reed Parry, Justin Vernon, Bruce Hornsby, So Percussion, Ruban Nielson.

==== Other benefit concerts ====
The National have played numerous benefits for a range of organizations, including MusiCares, Artists for Peace and Justice and the Robin Hood Foundation. They have also played at Philip Glass's Tibet House US (an organization that is dedicated to preserving Tibetan culture) at New York's Carnegie Hall twice: once in 2009 and once in 2014. The annual show is organized to help raise money for "the cultural institution" of the Tibetan heritage.

In October 2015, the National played two shows at The Troubadour in Los Angeles benefitting Cooperative for Education and their Thousand Girls Initiative, which is a program aimed at supporting the growth of educational opportunities for girls in Guatemala.

== Awards and recognition ==
The National's albums have accumulated several RIAA silver, gold, and platinum certifications across music charts in the United States, United Kingdom, Canada, Belgium, and other countries. They have the most certifications from Canada, including Platinum status for their single "I Need My Girl" and gold certifications for their albums, Trouble Will Find Me, High Violet, and singles "About Today," "Bloodbuzz," and "Fake Empire." In 2017, "The System Only Dreams in Total Darkness" became the band's first song to reach number one on a Billboard songs chart, reaching number one on the Adult Alternative Songs chart. They have been nominated for three Grammy Awards, three NME Awards, and one Brit Award.

Year	Award Ceremony	Category	Nominee/work	Ref
2011	Brit Award	International Breakthrough Act	The National	
2011	Spike Video Game Awards	Best Song in a Game	"Exile Vilify"	
2014	World Music Awards	World's Best Album	Trouble Will Find Me	
2014	World Music Awards	World's Best Live Act	The National	
2014	World Music Awards	World's Best Group	The National	
2014	Grammy Awards	Best Alternative Music Album	Trouble Will Find Me	
2018	Grammy Awards	Best Alternative Music Album	Sleep Well Beast	
2018	Grammy Awards	Best Recording Package	Sleep Well Beast	
2018	NME Awards	Best Album	Sleep Well Beast	
2018	NME Awards	Best Band in the World	The National	

Preceded by Beck	Saturday Night Live musical guest March 8, 2014	Succeeded by Sam Smith
