= Bryce Dessner =

American musician (born 1976)

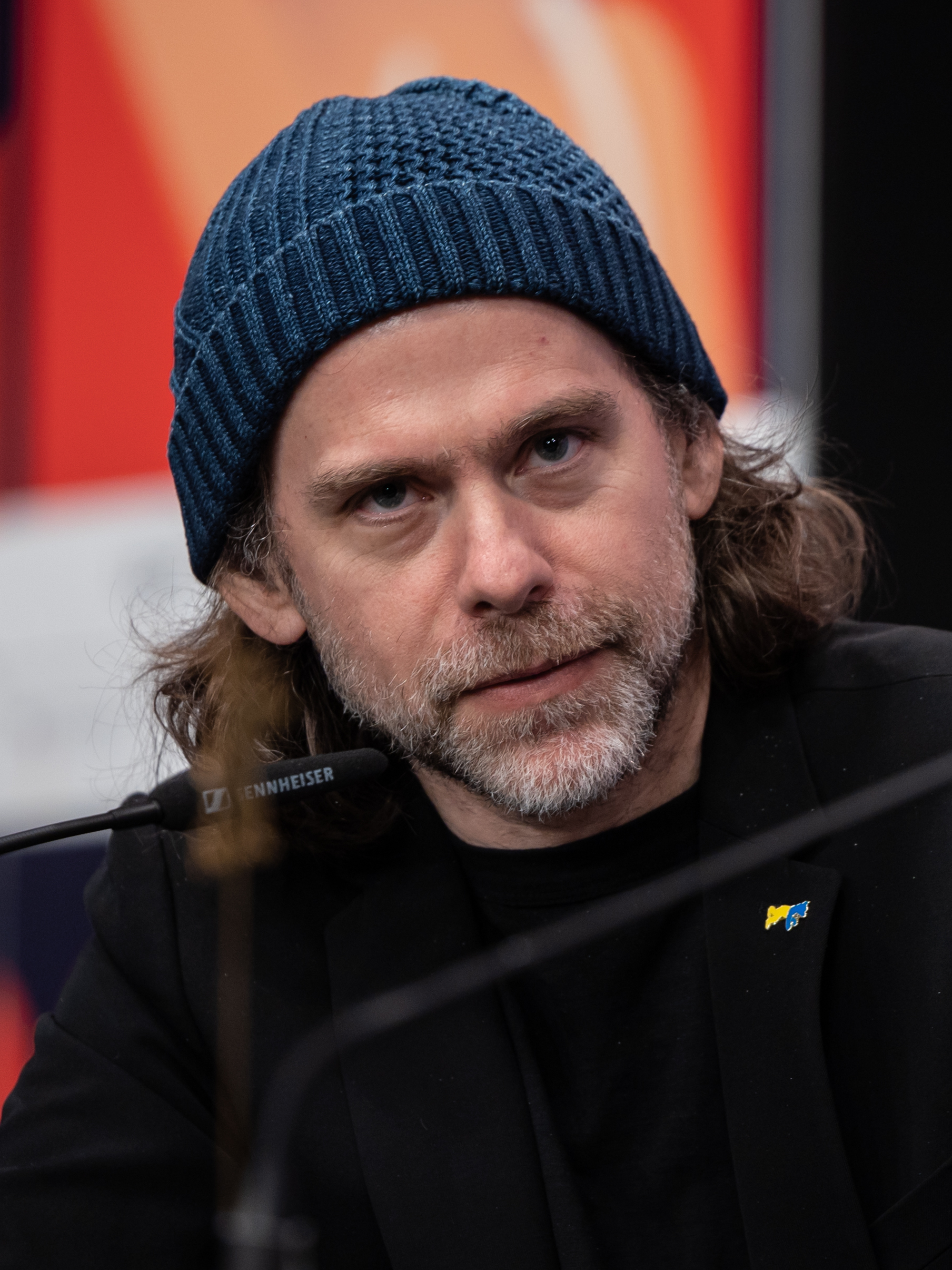
- Bryce Dessner at the Berlin Film Festival 2023

Background information
- Born: April 23, 1976 (age 50); Cincinnati, Ohio, U.S.
- Education: Yale University (BA); Yale School of Music (MM)
- Genres: Film scores; contemporary classical; indie rock
- Occupations: Composer; guitarist
- Instruments: Guitar; keyboards
- Years active: 1998–present
- Member of: The National; Clogs
- Spouse: Mina Tindle (2015–present)

Bryce David Dessner (born April 23, 1976) is an American composer and guitarist based in Paris and a member of the rock band the National. Dessner's twin brother, Aaron, is also a member of the group. Together, they write the music in collaboration with lead singer and lyricist Matt Berninger.

In addition to his work with the National, Dessner is known for his work as an independent composer. His orchestral, chamber, and vocal compositions have been commissioned by the Los Angeles Philharmonic, ensemble intercontemporain, Metropolitan Museum of Art (for the New York Philharmonic), Kronos Quartet, Carnegie Hall, BAM Next Wave Festival, Barbican Centre, Edinburgh International Festival, Sounds from a Safe Harbour Festival (Cork, Ireland), Sydney Festival, eighth blackbird, Sō Percussion, New York City Ballet, and many others. His work Murder Ballades was featured on eighth Blackbird's album Filament, an album he also produced and performed on, which won the 2016 Grammy Award for Best Small Ensemble Performance.

Dessner has collaborated with artists such as Philip Glass, Steve Reich, Paul Simon, Sufjan Stevens, Nico Muhly, Jonny Greenwood, Ryuichi Sakamoto, Alejandro González Iñárritu, Terry Riley, Justin Peck, Ragnar Kjartansson, Katia and Marielle Labèque, Nick Cave, and Taylor Swift, among others. Dessner is the founder of the MusicNOW Festival, co-founder of Copenhagen's HAVEN festival, and co-curator of the festival Sounds from a Safe Harbour. He is a founding member of the improvisatory instrumental group Clogs and co-founder of Brassland Records. In 2018, Dessner was named one of eight creative and artistic partners for the San Francisco Symphony as part of incoming Music Director Esa-Pekka Salonen's new leadership model for the orchestra in 2020. He has a bachelor's degree and master's degree in music from Yale University.

Dessner, along with his twin brother Aaron, was named the 243rd greatest guitarist of all time by Rolling Stone in 2023.

In 2026, Dessner earned his first Academy Award nomination for his work on the film Train Dreams.

== Early life ==
Dessner grew up in Cincinnati, Ohio, with his twin brother, Aaron Dessner.

Dessner was raised as Jewish and has Polish Jewish and Russian Jewish ancestry. Dessner attended high school at Cincinnati Country Day School and graduated in 1994.

== Composer ==
=== Compositions and tours ===
Dessner's compositions draw on elements from baroque and folk music, late Romanticism, and modernism, as well as minimalism. He composed the cello ensemble for Fondation Louis Vuitton and Gautier Capuçon's Classe d'Excellence, which premiered in June 2019. Concerto for Two Pianos, written for Katia and Marielle Labèque, premiered with London Philharmonic Orchestra in April 2018.

Other compositions include:

- Voy a Dormir (2018), written for mezzo-soprano Kelley O'Connor and the Orchestra of St. Luke's and commissioned by Carnegie Hall;
- Skrik Trio, commissioned by Steve Reich and Carnegie Hall for the Three Generations Series and premiered by Pekka Kuusisto, Nadia Sirota and Nicolas Altstaedt in April 2017 at Carnegie Hall;
- No Tomorrow (a ballet by Ragnar Kjartansson, Margrét Bjarnadóttir and Bryce Dessner), which premiered as part of the Sacrifice Festival, April 2017 and was the winner of Iceland's Gríman Award;
- The soundtrack for Death of Marsha P. Johnson, the Netflix documentary about the LGBT rights activist (2017);
- Wires, commissioned by Ensemble Intercontemporain and premiered at the Philharmonie de Paris, conducted by Matthias Pintscher, in 2016;
- The Most Incredible Thing written for the New York City Ballet, choreographed by Justin Peck with costumes by Marcel Dzama, which premiered February 2016 at Lincoln Center;
- Quilting for the Los Angeles Philharmonic, which premiered in May 2015 at the Walt Disney Concert Hall in Los Angeles and was performed by the LA Phil, conducted by Gustavo Dudamel;
- Wave Movements, an orchestral work co-composed with Richard Reed Parry and featuring visuals by the photographer Hiroshi Sugimoto, which premiered at the Barbican Concert Hall in London in the spring of 2015;
- 40 Canons for the Grammy Award-winning Kronos Quartet, which premiered at the Barbican Concert Hall in London in the spring of 2014;
- Reponse Lutoslawski for the National Audiovisual Institute of Poland, which was premiered by the Polish National Radio Symphony Orchestra in Warsaw in fall 2014;
- Black Mountain Songs for the Brooklyn Youth Chorus, which premiered at the Brooklyn Academy of Music in November 2014 and was released by New Amsterdam Records in March 2017;
- Music For Wood and Strings with Sō Percussion, which premiered at Carnegie Hall in November 2013;

His work Murder Ballades was inspired by American folk music and written for the multiple Grammy-winning new-music ensemble eighth blackbird. The group premiered the piece in Eindhoven in April 2013 and featured it on their 2015 album Filament. In addition to his work being featured on Filament, Dessner produced the album which won the Grammy Award for Best Chamber Music/Small Ensemble Performance in 2016. Justin Peck's dance with the same name, created for the L.A. Dance Project, also features Murder Ballades as its soundtrack. In September 2013, Lyon, France, hosted the ballet's world debut. The song was performed by eighth blackbird in October 2014 at the Brooklyn Academy of Music as live music accompaniment for a show by the L.A. Dance Project.

In addition, important past compositions by Dessner include three string quartets for Kronos Quartet (Aheym, Tenebre and Little Blue Something); Tour Eiffel for the Brooklyn Youth Chorus; O Shut Your Eyes Against the Wind for Bang on a Can All-Stars; Lachrimae for the Amsterdam Sinfonietta, Scottish Ensemble, and the Norwegian Chamber Orchestra; St. Carolyn by the Sea for the American Composers Orchestra and Muziekcentrum Eindhoven; and El Chan for piano quartet or piano duo, and which is widely toured by Katia and Marielle Labèque.

His evening-length oratorio Triptych (Eyes of One on Another) is set to a libretto by Korde Arrington Tuttle and poems by Patti Smith and Essex Hemphill, featuring vocal ensemble Roomful of Teeth, soprano Alicia Hall Moran, tenor Isaiah Thomas and dancer/choreographer Martell Ruffin, and combining 16th-century madrigals, blues and post-modern musical influences. Produced by ArKtype and directed by Kaneza Schaal, the work was created in partnership with The Robert Mapplethorpe Foundation. It explored the work of the photographer through the lens of its African-American subjects via Tuttle's deeply personal view of the contradictions and inherent racism within the artist's adoration and deification of the Black body, often eluding its humanism. It premiered as a concert version conducted by Sara Jobin with co-commissioner Los Angeles Philharmonic at Walt Disney Concert Hall in Los Angeles on March 5, 2019, followed by the full theatrical world premiere with co-commissioner and lead producing partner University Musical Society at the Power Center of Ann Arbor, on March 14, 2019. Triptych (Eyes of One on Another) was Dessner's first major theatrical work, and among the only rights granted for use of Mapplethorpe's images in performance.

Dessner is composing a staged setting of Ocean Vuong's poetry collection Night Sky with Exit Wounds for mezzo-soprano Fleur Barron, with a libretto by Vuong; a work-in-progress showing is scheduled at the Banff Centre for Arts and Creativity in February 2027.

His first opera, Herakles Mad, set to a libretto by Anne Carson after Euripides' Herakles, is scheduled to premiere at Theater Basel in May 2027.

The ballet, Frame of Mind, choreographed by Sydney Dance Company's artistic director Rafael Bonachela and featuring Dessner's string quartet compositions Aheym and Tenebre, has been toured all over the world and has won several Helpmann Awards.

In January 2012, Dessner signed to Chester Novello Publishing for his concert music.

He toured Australia solo for the first time in 2026 for performances in Sydney at the Sydney Opera House where the Sydney Symphony Orchestra conducted by Umberto Clerici performed the Australian premiere of Dessner's Cello Concerto "Trembling Earth", written for and performed by Anastasia Kobekina, and a program of Dessner-only compositions at City Recital Hall, which was also performed at the Melbourne Recital Centre.

=== Recordings ===
The first recordings of Dessner's compositions, performed by the Kronos Quartet, were released in 2013 by Anti-Records. The album, Aheym, features four of Dessner's compositions: Tenebre, Little Blue Something, Tour Eiffel, and Aheym.

On March 4, 2014, Deutsche Grammophon/Universal Music Classics released "St Carolyn By the Sea; Suite from There Will Be Blood." Performed by the Copenhagen Philharmonic and conducted by Andre de Ridder, the album features three of Dessner's orchestral works (St. Carolyn by the Sea, Lachrimae and Raphael) as well as the suite from There Will Be Blood by Jonny Greenwood.

May 19, 2015, marked the release on Brassland Records of Music for Wood and Strings, an album-length work composed by Dessner and performed by Sō Percussion on a set of experimental musical instruments Dessner named "Chord Sticks" and built by Aron Sanchez from Buke and Gase. The instruments function on the 3rd bridge principle, with muting the string attack and let the string resonance swell afterwards.

In April 2019, Deutsche Grammophon released the album El Chan featuring an all-Dessner programme performed by Katia and Marielle Labèque including Concerto for two pianos, El Chan, and Haven with Dessner on electric guitar. The album is dedicated to Dessner's friend and collaborator, Alejandro González Iñárritu, who also designed the album cover. Also in spring 2019, New York's Metropolitan Museum of Art, for one of its first contemporary installations, featured the song Death is Elsewhere written by Bryce alongside Aaron Dessner, Ragnar Kjartansson, Gyða Valtýsdóttir and Kristín Anna.

Dessner now resides in Paris and has been increasingly active composing for major European ensembles and soloists.

=== Film scores ===
Dessner has written the score for the major Netflix film The Two Popes (2019) directed by Fernando Meirelles, recorded with London Contemporary Orchestra at London's Abbey Road Studios.

In October 2015, Dessner was tapped along with Ryuichi Sakamoto and Alva Noto, to compose the score for the Oscar Award-winning director Alejandro González Iñárritu film The Revenant (2015). They received a nomination for Best Original Score in the 2016 Golden Globes and a nomination in the 2017 Grammy Awards for Best Score Soundtrack For Visual Media category.

Dessner's piece Tour Eiffel was featured in the 2015 Palme d'Or winner Dheepan, directed by Jacques Audiard. Tour Eiffel is performed by the Kronos Quartet and Brooklyn Youth Chorus.

Bryce and his brother Aaron Dessner co-composed the score for Transpecos, which won the Audience Award at the 2016 South by Southwest. They also worked together on the score for 2013 film Big Sur, an adaptation of the 1962 novel of the same name by Jack Kerouac. The film debuted on January 23, 2013, at the Sundance Film Festival, where it received positive reviews.

In 2007, Dessner and Padma Newsome's quartet, Clogs, had their music serve as the soundtrack to the film Turn the River (2007).

Dessner composed the score and title track for the 2025 film Train Dreams. The latter, on which he collaborated with Australian musician Nick Cave, earned him a nomination for the Academy Award for Best Original Song at the 98th Academy Awards.

== Collaborations ==
Dessner is a frequent collaborator with many respected artists, including Philip Glass, Steve Reich, Alejandro Iñárritu, Paul Simon, Sufjan Stevens, Caroline Shaw, Jonny Greenwood, Bon Iver, Justin Peck, Jennifer Koh, Kelley O'Connor, Ragnar Kjartansson and Nico Muhly. French singer Pomme announced that she was working with Dessner on her new album at the PEOPLE festival, Berlin.

=== The Most Incredible Thing ===
The Most Incredible Thing is a ballet created by Dessner, Justin Peck and Marcel Dzama. Based on Hans Christian Andersen's dark 1870 fairy tale of the same name, the ballet was written for the New York City Ballet and premiered at Lincoln Center in New York on February 2, 2016. The piece was performed throughout the New York City Ballet's 2016 season and was brought to the John F. Kennedy Center for the Performing Arts in March 2016.

=== Planetarium ===
Planetarium is a song cycle celebrating the Solar System created by Dessner, Nico Muhly, Sufjan Stevens, and James McAlister. The piece was co-commissioned by Muziekgebouw Eindhoven, the Barbican Centre and the Sydney Opera House and had its first run of European shows in March 2012. Planetarium has been performed at the Barbican Centre in London, Muziektheater in Amsterdam, the Sydney Opera House in Australia, Salle Pleyel in Paris and the Brooklyn Academy of Music in April 2013, where it had a four-night run.

=== The Long Count ===
The Long Count was a large commission for the BAM Next Wave Festival created by Bryce, Aaron Dessner and visual artist Matthew Ritchie. Together they created a work loosely based on the Mayan creation story Popol Vuh that includes a 12-piece orchestra and four guest singers: Kim Deal, Kelley Deal, Matt Berninger, and Shara Worden. The work had its world premiere on September 11, 2009, at the Krannert Center for the Performing Arts, as part of the Ellnora Festival, and its New York premiere in October 2009 at the Brooklyn Academy of Music. It has since been performed at the Holland Festival and the Barbican. Tunde Adebimpe, a member of the band TV on the Radio joined Dessner, Aaron, and Ritchie for the Barbican Centre performance.

=== Forever Love ===
Forever Love, a work with Icelandic performance artist Ragnar Kjartansson, is a blending of visual and performance art with live music. The piece is a collaborative song cycle written and performed with Aaron Dessner and Bryce Dessner alongside Icelandic artists Gyða and Kristín Anna Valtýsdóttir, formerly of the Icelandic band múm. It was commissioned by Eaux Claires festival and made its world premiere in 2015 where it served as the official starting point of the festival on both Friday and Saturday.

Forever Love marked a live performance reunion for the Dessner twins and Kjartansson, as both artists had previously collaborated on a six-hour video work, A Lot of Sorrow which documents The National performing their three and a half minute song, "Sorrow", for six hours in front of a live audience at MoMA PS1.

=== Kronos Quartet ===
Dessner first collaborated with Kronos Quartet in 2009. Founder David Harrington approached him about composing a piece for their performance at the Celebrate Brooklyn! festival in Brooklyn's Prospect Park. The piece Dessner wrote, Aheym, (meaning "homeward" in Yiddish), was inspired by his Jewish immigrant grandparents who settled near the park when they arrived in Brooklyn. In 2011, Dessner was commissioned by Kronos Quartet to compose a piece for the Barbican Centre's "Reverberations: The Influence of Steve Reich" festival in London. The piece, Tenebre, is based on the traditional Holy Week service in which 15 candles are gradually extinguished. Dessner, in his own words, "inverts the service" drawing the listener from darkness into light. Tenebre premiered May 7, 2011, at LSO St. Luke's and featured the pre-recorded vocals of Sufjan Stevens. In 2012, Dessner wrote and dedicated Little Blue Something to the ensemble. The piece was inspired by the music of Irena and Vojtech Havel, who blend early music with Czech folk music. It was premiered by Kronos on May 31, 2012, at the Ensems Festival in Valencia, Spain.

=== Day of the Dead ===
On March 17, 2016, Bryce and Aaron Dessner announced Day of the Dead, a charity tribute album to the Grateful Dead released by 4AD on May 20, 2016. Day of the Dead was created, curated and produced by Bryce and Aaron. The compilation is a wide-ranging tribute to the songwriting and experimentalism of the Dead which took four years to record, features over 60 artists from varied musical backgrounds, 59 tracks and is almost 6 hours long. All profits are helping to fight for AIDS/ HIV and related health issues around the world through the Red Hot Organization. Day of the Dead is the follow-up to 2009's Dark Was The Night (4AD), a 32-track, multi-artist compilation also produced by Aaron and Bryce for Red Hot.

Day of the Dead features collaborations and recordings from a diverse group of artists including Wilco, The Flaming Lips, Bruce Hornsby, Justin Vernon, The National, The War on Drugs, Lee Ranaldo of Sonic Youth, Ira Kaplan of Yo La Tengo, Jenny Lewis, Unknown Mortal Orchestra, Perfume Genius, Jim James of My Morning Jacket, Senegalese group Orchestra Baobab, composer Terry Riley and his son Gyan Riley, electronic artist Tim Hecker, jazz pianist Vijay Iyer and Béla Fleck.

Of the 59 tracks on the compilation, many feature a house band made up of Bryce, Aaron, fellow The National bandmates and brothers Scott and Bryan Devendorf, Josh Kaufman (who co-produced the project), and Conrad Doucette along with Sam Cohen and Walter Martin. The National have a couple of tracks on the album, including "Peggy-O", "Morning Dew" and "I Know You Rider".

A Day of the Dead live performance took place in August 2016 at the second annual Eaux Claires Festival (August 12–13) featuring Jenny Lewis, Matthew Houck, Lucius, Will Oldham, Sam Amidon, Richard Reed Parry, Justin Vernon, Bruce Hornsby, Ruban Nielson and The National.

=== Dream House Quartet ===
In 2018 Dessner's extended collaboration with pianists Katia and Marielle Labèque formalized into Dream House Quartet with the addition of guitarist and composer David Chalmin of La Terre Invisible, realizing a unique arrangement of duo piano and electric guitar. Dessner has since composed several works for the Quartet, as has David Chalmin, with additional commissions written for the Quartet by Caroline Shaw, Timo Andres, Max Richter and many others. New arrangements by Dessner of works by Philip Glass and Steve Reich are also part of the group's growing repertoire. In 2019 the group premiered Thom Yorke's first classical composition "Don't Fear the Light", performed live with Yorke in Paris, London and Berlin along with a new arrangement of Yorke's "Gawpers". In 2022, the Quartet premiered a new commission by Anna Thorvaldsdottir entitled "What Things Become" at London's Southbank Centre. On April 23, 2023, the Quartet made its North American debut at New York City's The Town Hall in a benefit concert for The Kitchen, followed by engagements in Austin, San Diego, Costa Mesa, Los Angeles, Stanford, Toronto, and New Haven in a tour produced by ArKtype, performing works by Dessner, Chalmin, Glass, Reich and Meredith Monk. The quartet's debut EP, Dream House Quartet, was released by Deutsche Grammophon on April 14, 2023, followed by the full-length album Sonic Wires on October 25, 2024.

=== Other collaborations and commissions ===
Dessner is a frequent collaborator with many of the most creative and renowned musicians working today, such as Philip Glass, Bang on a Can All-Stars, and Glenn Kotche. His collaborative style, with his twin brother Aaron Dessner has been called the Dessner Effect.

Dessner served as the musical director for Matthew Ritchie's 'The Morning Line' installation, collaborating with Ritchie and a number of contemporary composers, including Lee Ranaldo and Evan Ziporyn. In 2011, Dessner collaborated with Ritchie again, composing a song entitled "To The Sea", which was used for Matthew Ritchie's performance art piece 'Monstrance.' 'Monstrance' was performed in November 2011 on Venice Beach in Los Angeles, California. The performance was accompanied by a multi-media exhibition at L&M Arts, LA.

On July 2, 2009, Dessner performed Steve Reich's 2×5 premiere alongside Reich at the Manchester International Festival. On January 25, 2012, at Stanford University and on January 27, 2012, at Carnegie Hall, Dessner performed the world premiere of David Lang's new composition death speaks with Nico Muhly, Shara Worden, and Owen Pallett. Dessner is also featured on the death speaks record, which he produced.

Dessner and Jonny Greenwood of Radiohead performed "The Music of Jonny Greenwood and Bryce Dessner" as part of the 2012 Holland Festival. For the performance, Bryce composed a piece entitled "Lachrimae" as well as performed two other pieces with his brother Aaron Dessner and the Amsterdam Sinfonietta. The program was performed at the Muziekgebouw aan 't IJ in Amsterdam and the Muziekgebouw Frits Philips in Eindhoven.

After the success of Planetarium, Dessner further collaborated with Sufjan Stevens, providing additional guitar tracks on Stevens' "My Rajneesh" and "Make Me an Offer I Cannot Refuse" in 2020. He made a guest appearance on Stevens' tenth album Javelin, playing both acoustic and electric guitar on the 8-and-a-half-minute track "Shit Talk".

Dessner also collaborated with Richard Reed Parry of Arcade Fire on Parry's album Music for Heart and Breath.

In 2020, Bryce composed orchestrations for Taylor Swift's eighth studio album, Folklore, which was produced and co-written by his brother Aaron Dessner. In 2020, he also collaborated with Swift on her ninth studio album, Evermore, with the song "Coney Island" having features from Dessner and The National.

In 2022, Dessner began a multi-year residency with the Yale Schwarzman Center as its inaugural Artist-in-Residence in Music, produced in collaboration with ArKtype, commissioning several new works by female composers including a new work for Julia Bullock by Composer Carolyn Yarnell as part of Bullock's History's Persistent Voice series, a collaboration led by composer Nathalie Joachim with Yvonne Lam and Nicholas Houfek, a multi-disciplinary installation by Ash Fure, and culminating in a new evening length theatrical work composed by Dessner and conceived in collaboration with director Kaneza Schaal slated for premiere in 2026.

Dessner is featured on the song "Any Love of Any Kind" from Woodkid's soundtrack album to the 2025 video game Death Stranding 2: On the Beach.

Dessner was an Artist-in-Residence for the 2024–2025 season at the National Concert Hall in Dublin. For the 2025–2026 season, Dessner served as the inaugural Composer-in-Residence with the Czech Philharmonic during its 130th season.

== Curator ==
Dessner is the founder and curator of the annual Cincinnati-based MusicNOW Festival. He was tapped to curate 'Mountains and Waves', a weekend celebration of his music at the Barbican in London, May 2015, with guests including Steve Reich, eighth blackbird, Brooklyn Youth Chorus, Sō Percussion, Caroline Shaw, and the Britten Sinfonia. In September 2015, Dessner curated a weekend of performances at the Cork Opera House, Ireland. He is also the co-founder and co-curator of Crossing Brooklyn Ferry. In March 2010, Dessner co-curated the Big Ears Festival in Knoxville, Tennessee.

=== MusicNOW Festival ===
The MusicNOW Festival was founded by Dessner in April 2006. The festival is an annual showcase of the best in contemporary music, featuring musicians from around the world, and is held in Cincinnati, Ohio. The first festival was held at the small downstairs room at the Cincinnati CAC and featured performances from Wilco's Glenn Kotche, The Books, Erik Freidlander, Bell Orchestre, Burmese drummer Kyaw Kyaw Naing, and the Clogs. The following year the festival was moved to the Cincinnati Memorial Hall, which would become its home for the next several years. As the festival grew and established itself as an important annual cultural event, Dessner continued to curate line-ups that featured risk-taking artists who do not fit neatly into genre-defined categories.

MusicNOW celebrated its ten-year anniversary of the festival in 2015. To mark this special occasion the festival expanded to include five nights of performances in three venues. The year's festival included performances from Lone Bellow, Mina Tindle, Perfume Genius, The National, Sō Percussion, Butt Nothings, Will Butler, and many others. Continuing the tradition from last year, the Cincinnati Symphony Orchestra was featured throughout the weekend. In honor of the ten-year anniversary the festival also released "MusicNOW – 10 Years", a compilation album collecting live recordings of some of the best performances the series has seen over the past decade. The festival returns to Cincinnati for its twelve season in January 2017.

Past festivals have featured festival-only collaborations, such as one between David Cossin and Glenn Kotche; new music from Sufjan Stevens, Richard Reed Parry (of Arcade Fire); and performances by Tinariwen, Steve Reich, Owen Pallett, The National (band), Grizzly Bear (band), Joanna Newsom, Kronos Quartet and many, many more.

=== Sounds from a Safe Harbour ===
Dessner curated a brand new festival of music and art called Sounds from a Safe Harbour. The festival took place in Cork, Ireland, from September 17 to 20, 2015 and featured new commissions, collaborations and performances in venues throughout the city. The inaugural weekend featured performances by Shara Worden's My Brightest Diamond, celebrated English organist James McVinnie, Sō Percussion, and Mina Tindle. It also featured a collaboration between Bryce, Aaron Dessner, Marcel Dzama, Lisa Hannigan, members of internationally renowned new music group Crash Ensemble and virtuosic Canadian violinist, Yuki Numata Resnick.

After a year off in 2016, Sounds from a Safe Harbour returned to Cork from the 14th to the 17th of September, 2017. The National kicked off their world tour, in support of the new album Sleep Well Beast, at the festival on September 16 at the Cork Opera House. Other marquee acts were Lisa Hannigan and Aaron Dessner with the RTE National Symphony Orchestra on September 14, and Bon Iver on September 15, both also at the Cork Opera House. A myriad of other musicians played in venues around the city across the weekend, as well as the festival featuring Icelandic artist Ragnar Kjartansson presenting his piece "Guilt Trip" at the Crawford Art Gallery from the 14 to the 16th of September.

=== Michelberger Music Festival ===
Michelberger Music was a not-for-profit, one-off gathering of artists at the Funkhaus in Berlin for a weekend-long festival of music curated and produced by Bryce along with his brother Aaron Dessner, Justin Vernon, Vincent Moon, André de Ridder, Brandon Reid, Ryan Olson and Berlin's Michelberger Hotel. The festival took place October 1–2, 2016 in the historical radio recording studios of the former GDR. Before the festival, all the artists spent a week together in Berlin, rehearsing and working in the spaces where the shows took place. The festival featured 80 artists, including Bon Iver, Mouse on Mars' Andi Toma and Jan St. Werner, Erlend Øye, My Brightest Diamond's Shara Nova, Lisa Hannigan, Damien Rice, Woodkid, Boysnoize, Beirut and many more.

=== PEOPLE Festival ===
On August 18 and 19, 2018, Bryce returned with the Michelberger Music Festival makers for a second edition, which was now called PEOPLE. This time 200 artists created across 30 Studios and performed across 8 stages over 170 unique performances at the historic Funkhaus in Berlin. Once again, all artists met one week prior to discover new music and engage with each other. PEOPLE was a non-hierarchical gathering put together by the artists with full creative freedom. There were no sponsors or brands. No line up. No artist fees. 100% of the ticket costs went towards the production. In addition to the artists of the 2016 edition, musicians like Leslie Feist, Moses Sumney, Arcade Fire's Richard Reed Parry, Lambchop's Kurt Wagner, Deerhof's Greg Saunier, Sigur Rós' Kjartan Sweinsson, Jenny Lewis, Adam Cohen, Greg Fox, Shahzad Ismaily and many more joined in.

=== Crossing Brooklyn Ferry ===
Crossing Brooklyn Ferry is a music festival curated by Aaron and Bryce Dessner. The festival showcases bands, composers, singer-songwriters and filmmakers from all corners of the New York music scene. The inaugural festival took place May 3–5, 2012 at the Brooklyn Academy of Music and included performances by the Walkmen, St. Vincent, Beirut, The Antlers, yMusic and Jherek Bischoff, as well as newly commissioned films by Jonas Mekas, Joseph Gordon-Levitt and Tunde Adebimpe, among others. The second season took place April 25–27, 2013 at BAM and included performances by The Roots, Solange, TV on the Radio, Phosphorescent and the Brooklyn Youth Chorus. The event also featured a curated program of film shorts and a visual art installation by Andrew Ondrejcak.

=== HAVEN ===
Dessner is co-curator of HAVEN, Copenhagen's annual festival "for the senses, merging experiments in art, music, beer and food". The festival, which launched in 2017, explores the ways in which the art forms intersect, providing the opportunity to discover new tastes, sounds and sights. Its inaugural year saw performances from the likes of Iggy Pop, Bon Iver, and The National.

== Producer ==
Dessner has produced and orchestrated tracks on The National's albums High Violet (2010) and Trouble Will Find Me (2013). Outside of his work with The National, Dessner produced eighth blackbird's Filament (2015), which won Best Chamber Music/Small Ensemble Performance in the 2016 Grammys. He also produced Pulitzer Prize-winning composer David Lang's album Death Speaks (2013), Pedro Soler and Gaspar Claus' album Barlande (2011) and Richard Reed Parry's album Music for Heart and Breath, which was released on classical label Deutsche Grammophon. Additionally, Bryce orchestrated tracks on Local Natives' Hummingbird (2013) and Sharon Van Etten's Tramp (2012), both of which were produced by his brother Aaron Dessner. The brothers also produced sister Jessica Dessner's 2023 Complete Mountain Almanac.

=== Dark Was the Night and Day of the Dead ===
In 2009, Bryce and Aaron produced an extensive AIDS charity compilation, Dark Was the Night, for the Red Hot Organization. The record features exclusive recordings and collaborations from a long list of artists including David Byrne, Arcade Fire, Sufjan Stevens, Feist, Sharon Jones, Cat Power, Grizzly Bear, Antony Hegarty, My Morning Jacket, and Spoon. Dark Was the Night has raised over 1.6 million dollars for AIDS charities. On May 3, 2009, 4AD and Red Hot produced Dark Was the Night – Live, a concert celebrating the newest Red Hot album. The show took place at Radio City Music Hall and featured several of the artists that contributed to the compilation.

In 2016, Day of the Dead. the follow-up to Dark Was the Night was released. Bryce and Aaron also produced this album, and again, all profits will go to the Red Hot Organization's mission to fight HIV/AIDs around the world.

== Clogs ==
Clogs is a mostly-instrumental improvising quartet led by Dessner and Padma Newsome. Since 2001, they have released five widely acclaimed albums on Brassland Records, and have toured with The Books in the UK and played at the Sydney Festival. Clogs' music served as the soundtrack to the Chris Eigeman film Turn the River (2007).

Clogs' musical style and approach is hard to categorize. Although the band members all play classical instruments (they met at the Yale School of Music), their writing process is more akin to that of a rock band or a jazz quartet. Drawing upon a vast variety of styles and influences, the group members bring basic ideas and riffs into rehearsals, which, through group improvisations they then develop into complex, larger-scale pieces. Their music is often influenced by minimalism, folk and rock music, Americana, modernism and Indian classical music.

== Brassland ==
Alongside Alec Hanley Bemis and Aaron Dessner, Bryce founded Brassland Records, a label that has released early albums from The National, Clogs, Doveman and Nico Muhly.

== Personal life ==
Dessner has lived in France since 2016. He is married to French singer Mina Tindle, who has provided vocals to several of The National's albums. They share a son, Octave. He co-produced Tindle's second album, Parades, in 2014.

== Works ==
- Memorial commissioned by the New York Guitar Festival and 92nd Street Y, 2006.
- Turn the River score for the independent film, co-composed with Padma Newsome as Clogs, and commissioned by Mr. Nice Film Productions, 2007.
- Quintets commissioned by the Kitchen and American Composers Forum through a grant from the Jerome Foundation, 2007.
- Raphael commissioned by the Kitchen and American Composers Forum through a grant from the Jerome Foundation, 2007.
- Propolis co-composed with David Sheppard and Evan Ziporyn, and commissioned by Thyssen Bornemisza Art Contemporary, 2008.
- Lincoln Shuffle commissioned by the Rosenbach Library for Abraham Lincoln's Bicentennial, 2009.
- Aheym commissioned by the Kronos Quartet for the 2009 Celebrate Brooklyn! festival.
- The Long Count co-composed with Aaron Dessner, and commissioned by the Brooklyn Academy of Music Next Wave Festival, 2009.
- O Shut Your Eyes Against the Wind commissioned by the People's Commissioning Fund and Bang on a Can for the Ecstatic Music Festival, 2010.
- Tour Eiffel commissioned by the Brooklyn Youth Chorus, St. Ann's Warehouse, the Kaufman Center, the Manhattan New Music Project and the Ecstatic Music Festival, 2010.
- Tenebre commissioned by the Kronos Quartet and the Barbican Centre, 2010.
- Long Winter written for cellist Zachary Miskin, and commissioned by Naive Records, 2010.
- To the Sea premiered during the "Monstrance" installation collaboration with Matthew Ritchie at L&M Arts Los Angeles, 2011.
- St. Carolyn by the Sea commissioned by the American Composers Orchestra and Muziekcentrum Eindhoven, 2011.
- Lachrimae commissioned by the Amsterdam Sinfonietta, the Scottish Ensemble, and the Norwegian Chamber Orchestra, 2012.
- Little Blue Something written for the Kronos Quartet, 2012.
- Murder Ballades commissioned by eighth blackbird and Luna Park, 2013.
- Music for Wood and Strings commissioned by Carnegie Hall, 2013.
- Reponse Lutoslawski commissioned by the National Audiovisual Institute (Poland), 2013.
- Black Mountain Song commissioned by Brooklyn Youth Chorus and Brooklyn Academy of Music, 2013.
- 40 Canons commissioned by the Kronos Quartet, 2014.
- Quilting Symphony commissioned by the Los Angeles Philharmonic, 2014.
- Wave Movements co-composed with Richard Reed Parry, commissioned by Barbican Centre, EIF, Cork Opera House, Sydney Festival, and St. Denis Festival, 2015.
- Ornament and Crime commissioned by Muziekgebouw aan 't IJ, 2015.
- Delphica commissioned by Muziekgebouw aan 't IJ, 2015.
- Garcia Counterpoint commissioned by Muziekgebouw aan 't IJ, 2015.
- Median Organs commissioned by the Southbank Centre, 2015.
- Tuusula commissioned by Meidän Festivaali, Sounds from a Safe Harbor, and National Sawdust, 2015.
- The Most Incredible Thing commissioned by the New York City Ballet, 2016.
- El Chan commissioned by Britten Sinfonia and Wigmore Hall, 2016.
- Gift commissioned by Jennifer Koh with the generous support of Justus Schlichting to whom this music is dedicated, 2016.
- Wires commissioned by Ensemble Intercontemporain and NTR Zaterdag, 2016.
- Suite for Harp in three movements 2nd movement developed in collaboration with Yuki Numata Resnick, 2016.
- On a Wire commissioned by Lavinia Meijer, 2016.
- Death of Marsha P. Johnson soundtrack for the Netflix documentary about the LGBT rights activist (2017).
- No Tomorrow (a ballet by Ragnar Kjartansson, Margrét Bjarnadóttir and Bryce Dessner) premiered as part of the Sacrifice Festival, April 2017. The ballet won the Gríman Award, Iceland's highest performance award.
- Skrik Trio commissioned by Steve Reich and Carnegie Hall for the Three Generations Series, and premiered by Pekka Kuusisto, Nadia Sirota and Nicolas Altstaedt in April 2017 at Carnegie Hall.
- Voy a Dormir (2018) written for mezzo-soprano Kelley O'Connor and Orchestra of St. Luke's and co-commissioned by Carnegie Hall.
- Concerto for Two Pianos (2018) written for Katia and Marielle Labèque, premiered with London Philharmonic Orchestra in April 2018.
- Cyrano (2018) stage musical with music composed with Aaron Dessner, lyrics by Matt Berninger and Carin Besser, and book by Erika Schmidt. Later adapted into a film score in 2021.
- Triptych (Eyes of One on Another) (2019) premiered by Roomful of Teeth in Los Angeles, integrating the work of photographer Robert Mapplethorpe, with co-commissioners including the LA Philharmonic, Brooklyn Academy of Music, Barbican, Holland Festival, Adelaide Festival, University of Michigan, Edinburgh International Festival.
- Violin Concerto (2021)
- Herakles Mad (2027), opera to a libretto by Anne Carson, Theater Basel.

== Discography ==
=== Albums ===
- Tower of Babel (Project Nim)
- Where the Nothings Live (Project Nim)
- Evenings Pop and Curve (Project Nim)
- The National (October 30, 2001) (The National)
- Sad Songs for Dirty Lovers (September 2, 2003) (The National)
- Alligator (April 12, 2005) (The National)
- Boxer (May 22, 2007) (The National)
- High Violet (May 10, 2010) (The National)
- Trouble Will Find Me (May 17, 2013) (The National)
- Aheym (November 5, 2013) (Kronos Quartet)
- St Carolyn by the Sea; Suite from There Will Be Blood (March 4, 2014) (Copenhagen Philharmonic)
- Music for Wood and Strings (May 4, 2015) (Sō Percussion)
- Filament – Murder Ballades (September 11, 2015) (eighth blackbird)
- Sleep Well Beast (September 8, 2017) (The National)
- I Am Easy to Find (May 17, 2019) (The National)
- El Chan (April 5, 2019) (Dessner-Labèque)
- Solos (August 23, 2024) (Dessner)

=== EPs ===
- Cherry Tree EP (July 20, 2004)
- The Virginia EP (May 20, 2008)

=== Singles ===
- "Abel" (Beggars Banquet Records, March 14, 2005)
- "Secret Meeting" (Beggars Banquet Records, August 29, 2005)
- "Lit Up" (Beggars Banquet Records, November 14, 2005)
- "Mistaken for Strangers" (Beggars Banquet Records, April 30, 2007)
- "Apartment Story" (Beggars Banquet Records, November 5, 2007)
- "Fake Empire" (Beggars Banquet Records, June 23, 2008)
- "Bloodbuzz Ohio" (4AD, May 3, 2010)
- "Anyone's Ghost" (4AD, June 28, 2010)
- "Terrible Love" (4AD, November 22, 2010)
- "Think You Can Wait" (March 22, 2011)
- "Conversation 16" (4AD, March 29, 2011)
- "Exile Vilify" (April 19, 2011)

=== Film scores ===
- Big Sur (2013) with Aaron Dessner
- The Revenant (2015) as additional score
- Transpecos (2016) with Aaron Dessner
- The Death and Life of Marsha P. Johnson (2017)
- The Professor (2018) with Aaron Dessner
- The Kitchen (2019)
- The Two Popes (2019)
- Irresistible (2020)
- Jockey (2021) with Aaron Dessner
- Cyrano (2021) with Aaron Dessner
- C'mon, C'mon (2021) with Aaron Dessner
- Bardo, False Chronicle of a Handful of Truths (2022) with Alejandro G. Iñárritu
- She Came to Me (2023)
- A Good Person (2023)
- Abbé Pierre – A Century of Devotion (2023)
- Sing Sing (2023)
- Widow Clicquot (2023)
- Dandelion (2024) with Aaron Dessner
- We Live in Time (2024)
- The Accountant 2 (2025)
- Train Dreams (2025)

=== Session work ===
Richard Reed Parry

- "VII Freeform Winds/String Drones" Music For Heart and Breath (Deutsche Grammophon, 2014)

David Lang

- death speaks (Cantaloupe, 2013)

Steve Reich

- "2×5" Double Sextet/2×5 (Nonesuch Records, 2010)

Erik Friedlander

- Grains of Paradise (Tzadik, 2001)

== Further information ==
- Stereogum photos
- First four years retrospective at Each Note Secure
