= MusicNOW Festival =

Music festival

- Location: Cincinnati
- Years active: 2006

MusicNOW is a contemporary music and arts festival founded in 2006 in Cincinnati, Ohio, by Chamber Music Cincinnati. President Audrey Luna and guitarist and composer Bryce Dessner curated this inaugural season. It was originally held at the Contemporary Arts Center and later moved to Memorial Hall, a small historic theater located in the city's historic Over-the-Rhine district. Festival performers have included contemporary music advocates Bang on a Can All-Stars and Kronos Quartet as well as indie rock groups such as Grizzly Bear, Dirty Projectors and The National. Two annual elements of the festival have been the inclusion of visual art, including installations by Karl Jensen, and new music commissions.

In 2014, MusicNOW became part of Cincinnati Symphony Orchestra's annual subscription season. This inclusion ceased in 2018, when MusicNOW expanded to be held in association with Homecoming, a new music festival curated and headlined by The National, essentially merging the two festivals into an expansive city-wide event, though the two festivals are ticketed separately.

After a two-year break in 2019–20, MusicNOW will return, and will take place on 07-09 May 2021. 2020 saw the festival get cancelled caused by the COVID-19 pandemic.

== Commissions and premieres ==
MusicNOW 2006: Glenn Kotche and David Cossin collaboration

MusicNOW 2007: Four selections from Enjoy Your Rabbit by Sufjan Stevens were commissioned for string quartet

MusicNOW 2008: Premieres of new work from Nico Muhly and Sufjan Stevens.

MusicNOW 2009: New works for Kronos Quartet from Richard Reed Parry and Tyondai Braxton.

MusicNOW 2010: New work for yMusic from Annie Clark, recording artist St. Vincent and a new piece for Nadia Sirota from Evan Ziporyn

MusicNOW 2011: New for y Music from Richard Reed Parry.

MusicNOW 2012: New music for Eighth Blackbird from Nico Muhly.

MusicNOW 2015: Premiere of "Lo" by Caroline Shaw and new commission by Daniel Bjarnason for Cincinnati Symphony Orchestra.

== Performers and collaborators ==
=== 2006 edition ===
The 2006 Festival was held at the Contemporary Arts Center, April 26–30, and featured Awadagin Pratt, CelloProject, Bell Orchestre, Glenn Kotche, Clogs, The Books, David Cossin, Kyaw Kyaw Naing, Erik Friedlander, Bell Orchestre,

=== 2007 edition ===
The 2007 festival took place April 5-7 and featured Amiina, My Brightest Diamond, Pedro Soler, Clogs, David Cossin, Amiina, Irena & Vojtech Havel, Sufjan Stevens

=== 2008 edition ===
In 2008, Andrew Bird, fresh from recording, shared many of the songs from his recent release. The first evening of festival featured world premieres from Doveman and Aaron Dessner, Nico Muhly, and Sufjan Stevens.

Additional performances by Bang on a Can All-Stars, Bill Frisell, Grizzly Bear, The Dirty Projectors, Ben Verdery, and Glenn Kotche.

=== 2009 edition ===
For 2009, the Kronos Quartet was in residence. Acclaimed kora player, Toumani Diabate performed a solo concert at the Cincinnati Zoo. The Books made a return appearance previewing material from their 2010 release. Festival commissions included two pieces for the Kronos Quartet, one from Richard Reed Parry and one from Tyondai Braxton.

=== 2010 edition ===
The fifth annual event featured three nights of music from March 30 to April 1, including performances from Robin Pecknold, Joanna Newsom, yMusic, St. Vincent, Colin Stetson, and Justin Vernon

=== 2011 edition ===
In its sixth year, the MusicNOW Festival featured performances from The National, Sharon Van Etten, Little Scream, Owen Pallett, Tim Hecker, Shara Worden, Richard Reed Parry, yMusic, Megafaun, and Sounds of the South, a collaboration between Megafaun and Fight the Big Bull.

=== 2012 edition ===
In its seventh year, the 2012 MusicNOW Festival featured performances by Sandro Perri, eighth blackbird with Philip Glass, Sam Amidon, Pedro Soler and Gaspar Claus, James McVinnie and a workshop presentation of the Planetarium song cycle from Nico Muhly, Sufjan Stevens, Richard Reed Parry, This is the Kit and Bryce Dessner.

=== 2013 edition ===
In its eighth year, the MusicNOW Festival featured performances from Glen Hansard, Tinariwen and Steve Reich among others. It also featured artwork by Cincinnati-born artists Nathlie Provosty and Jessie Henson.

=== 2014 edition ===
In its ninth year, the MusicNOW Festival featured performances from eighth blackbird, Bryce and Aaron Dessner, Olga Bell, Louis Langree, Bonnie "prince" Billy and more. It featured musical compositions by Bryce and Aaron Dessner, Nico Muhly, Scriabin, Krzysztof Penderecki, Jonny Greenwood, David Lang, and Prokofiev.

=== 2015 edition ===
MusicNOW celebrated its decennial with five nights of music spread throughout three venues. Performers included Lone Bellow Perfume Genius, Mina Tindle, The National, and Will Butler. This year also celebrated the release of a ten-year compilation album, featuring a decade of music performed at the festival.

=== 2016 edition ===
In its eleventh year, MusicNOW Festival featured Punch Brothers, Sam Amidon, Luluc and Chris Thile, as well as performances by Kronos Quartet, Musical America Artist of the Year Jenny Koh, and Composer-in-Residence and Pulitzer Prize winner Julia Wolfe. The weekend also included a special world premiere full orchestra version of Bryce Dessner's Aheym, performed by the CSO and Kronos Quartet, as well as the U.S. premiere of Dessner's Réponse Lutoslawski, performed by the CSO.

=== 2017 edition ===
In its twelfth year, MusicNOW Festival featured Bob Weir and the Campfire Band, Lisa Hannigan, and LNZNDRF. In collaboration with the Cincinnati Symphony Orchestra, the festival presented the acclaimed Play by Grawemeyer Award winning composer Andrew Norman, as well as the Pulitzer shortlisted The Banister Chronicles performed and composed by Timo Andres. Finnish violinist Pekka Kuusisto performed György Ligeti's violin concerto as well as two pre show concerts. The orchestra was conducted by Matthias Pintscher, also performed Aerialty composed by Anna S Þorvaldsdóttir and Idyl by Pintscher and accompanied Lisa Hannigan with new orchestrations written by Timo Andres, Bryce Dessner and André_de_Ridder.

=== 2020 edition ===
This was supposed to return after two years following its last in 2018. The Black Lives Matter protests, coupled by the pandemic, caused the 14th festival to defer to 2021.
