= Mistaken for Strangers =

Mistaken for Strangers may refer to:

- "Mistaken for Strangers" (song), a song by The National from their 2007 album Boxer
- Mistaken for Strangers (film), a film about The National released in 2013
