= List of awards and nominations received by Bruce Springsteen =

Bruce Springsteen awards and nominations
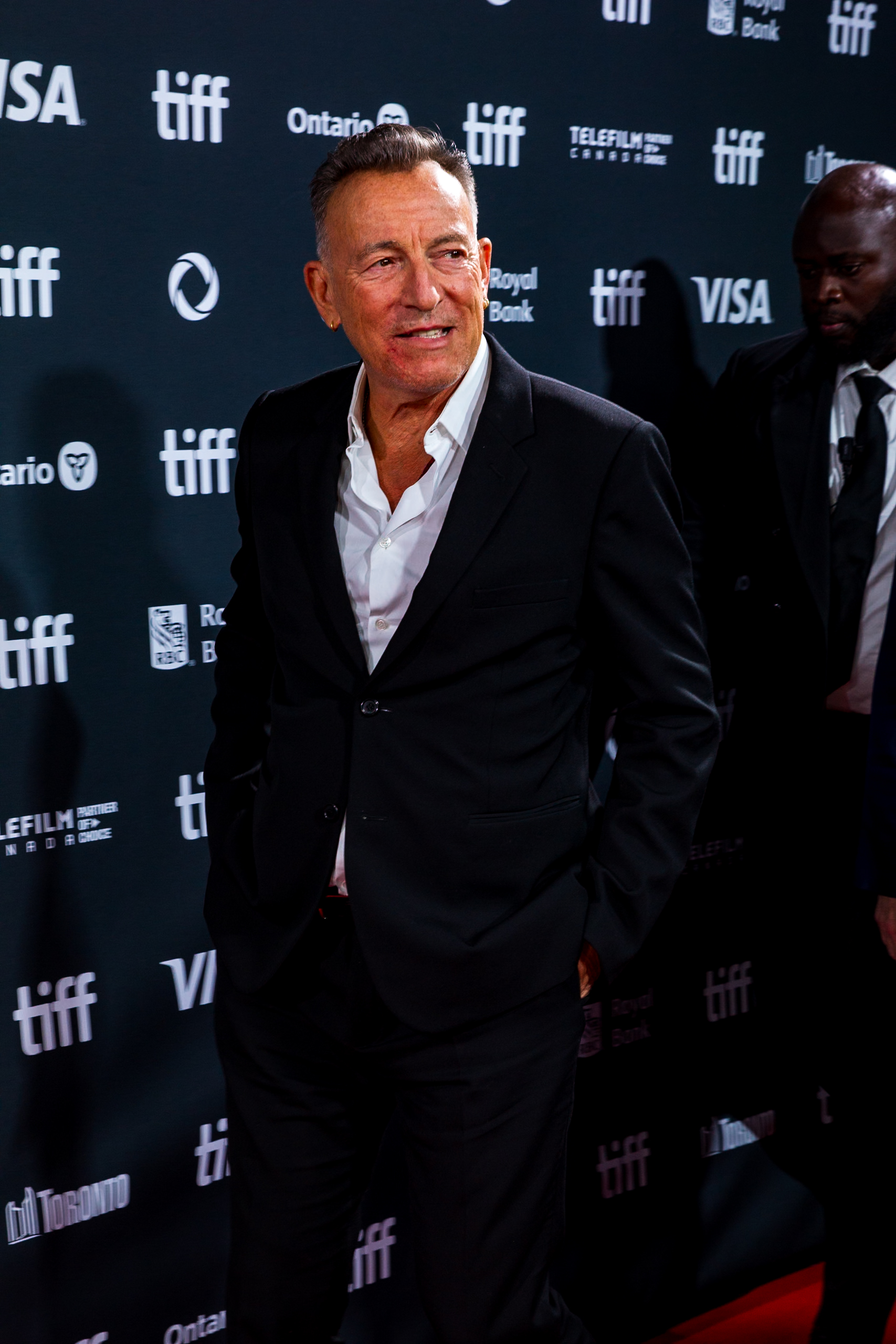
- Springsteen at the 2024 Toronto International Film Festival
Awards and nominations
| Award | Wins | Nominations |
| Academy Awards | 1 | 2 |
| Brit Awards | 1 | 10 |
| Critics' Choice Awards | 2 | 2 |
| Emmy Awards | 0 | 3 |
| Golden Globes | 2 | 3 |
| Grammy Awards | 20 | 51 |
| Juno Awards | 1 | 2 |
| MTV Awards | 5 | 20 |
| Tony Awards | 1 | 1 |

Totals (Note: Certain award groups do not simply award one winner. They acknowledge several different recipients, have runners-up, and have third place. Since this is a specific recognition and is different from losing an award, runner-up mentions are considered wins in this award tally. For simplification and to avoid errors, each award in this list has been presumed to have had a prior nomination.)
- Wins: 41
- Nominations: 121

Bruce Springsteen is an American singer, songwriter, and musician who is both a solo artist and the leader of the E Street Band. During a career that has spanned six decades, Springsteen has received various accolades including an Academy Award, 20 Grammy Awards, two Golden Globe Awards, and a Tony Award as well as nominations for three Primetime Emmy Awards. He has received several honors including with the Kennedy Center Honors in 2009, the Presidential Medal of Freedom in 2016, and the National Medal of Arts in 2023.

Springsteen has become known for his poetic and socially conscious lyrics and lengthy, energetic stage performances. He has earned numerous awards for his music, including 20 Grammy Awards out of 51 nominations. Springsteen received his first Grammy Award for Best Male Rock Vocal Performance for "Dancing in the Dark" (1985) followed by a win for Best Solo Rock Vocal Performance for his album Tunnel of Love (1988). He wrote and sung the song "Streets of Philadelphia" for the legal drama Philadelphia (1993) for which he won four Grammy Awards for Song of the Year, Best Rock Song, Best Rock Vocal Performance and Best Song Written for Visual Media. He also won Best Rock song for "The Rising" (2003), "Radio Nowhere" (2008), "Girls in Their Summer Clothes" (2009), and "We Take Care of Our Own" (2013). He won for Best Contemporary Folk Album for The Ghost of Tom Joad in 1997 and Best Traditional Folk Album for We Shall Overcome: The Seeger Sessions in 2007.

Springsteen is also known for writing several songs for film including "Streets of Philadelphia" from the Jonathan Demme directed legal drama Philadelphia (1993) for which he won the Academy Award for Best Original Song and the Golden Globe Award for Best Original Song. He wrote "Dead Man Walkin'", the title song for the Tim Robbins drama Dead Man Walking (1995) for which he was nominated for the Academy Award for Best Original Song. He also wrote, "The Wrestler" from the Darren Aronofsky psychological drama The Wrestler (2008) for which he won the Critics' Choice Movie Award for Best Song as well as a nomination for the Golden Globe Award for Best Original Song. He wrote the song "Addicted to Romance" for the Rebecca Miller romantic comedy She Came to Me (2023) for which he was nominated for his third Golden Globe Award.

He is also known for his work on television. He has been nominated for three Primetime Emmy Awards: Outstanding Variety Special for his television special Bruce Springsteen & The E Street Band: Live in New York City (2001), Outstanding Short-Format Live-Action Entertainment Program for the Bruce Springsteen Super Bowl Halftime Show (2009) and Outstanding Variety Special (Pre-Recorded) for the Netflix special Springsteen on Broadway (2019). On stage, he a Special Tony Award for his Broadway concert residency Springsteen on Broadway in 2018.

Springsteen has sold more than 140 million records worldwide and more than 71 million records in the United States, making him one of the world's best-selling artists. Springsteen was inducted into both the Songwriters Hall of Fame the Rock and Roll Hall of Fame, and the New Jersey Hall of Fame. Springsteen has also been honored by Rolling Stone Magazine with them ranking him No. 23 of the 100 Greatest Artists of All Time in 2004, and Time Magazine listing him among the 100 Most Influential People of the Year in 2008.

== Major associations ==
=== Academy Awards ===
| Year | Category | Nominated work | Result | Ref. |
|---|---|---|---|---|
| 1993 | Best Original Song | "Streets of Philadelphia" (from Philadelphia) | Won | |
| 1995 | Best Original Song | "Dead Man Walkin'" (from Dead Man Walking) | Nominated | |

=== Critics' Choice Awards ===
| Year | Category | Nominated work | Result | Ref. |
Critics' Choice Movie Awards
| 2008 | Best Song | "The Wrestler" (from The Wrestler) | Won | |
Critics' Choice Documentary Awards
| 2019 | Best Narration | Western Stars | Won | |

=== Emmy Awards ===
| Year | Category | Nominated work | Result | Ref. |
Primetime Emmy Awards
| 2001 | Outstanding Variety Special | Bruce Springsteen & The E Street Band | Nominated | |
| 2009 | Outstanding Short-Format Live-Action Entertainment Program | Bruce Springsteen Super Bowl Halftime Show | Nominated | |
| 2019 | Outstanding Variety Special (Pre-Recorded) | Springsteen on Broadway | Nominated | |

=== Golden Globe Awards ===
| Year | Category | Nominated work | Result | Ref. |
|---|---|---|---|---|
| 1993 | Best Original Song | "Streets of Philadelphia" (from Philadelphia) | Won | |
| 2008 | Best Original Song | "The Wrestler" (from The Wrestler) | Won | |
| 2023 | Best Original Song | "Addicted to Romance" (from She Came to Me) | Nominated | |

=== Grammy Awards ===
Springsteen has won 20 Grammy Awards out of 51 nominations.

| Year | Category | Nominated work | Result | Ref. |
|---|---|---|---|---|
| 1981 | Best Rock Vocal Performance, Male | "Devil with the Blue Dress"/ "Good Golly Miss Molly" / "Jenny Take a Ride" | Nominated | |
| 1982 | Best Rock Vocal Performance, Male | The River | Nominated | |
| 1985 | Record of the Year | "Dancing in the Dark" | Nominated | |
| 1985 | Best Rock Vocal Performance, Male | "Dancing in the Dark" | Won | |
| 1985 | Album of the Year | Born in the U.S.A. | Nominated | |
| 1986 | Record of the Year | "Born in the U.S.A." | Nominated | |
| 1988 | Best Rock Vocal Solo Performance | Tunnel of Love | Won | |
| 1988 | Best Pop Vocal Performance, Male | "Brilliant Disguise" | Nominated | |
| 1988 | Best Rock Instrumental Performance | "Paradise By The "C"" | Nominated | |
| 1993 | Best Rock Song | "Human Touch" | Nominated | |
| 1993 | Best Rock Vocal Performance, Male | Human Touch | Nominated | |
| 1995 | Best Rock Song | "Streets of Philadelphia" (from Philadelphia) | Won | |
| 1995 | Best Rock Vocal Performance, Male | "Streets of Philadelphia" (from Philadelphia) | Won | |
| 1995 | Song of the Year | "Streets of Philadelphia" (from Philadelphia) | Won | |
| 1995 | Best Song Written for Visual Media | "Streets of Philadelphia" (from Philadelphia) | Won | |
| 1995 | Record of the Year | "Streets of Philadelphia" (from Philadelphia) | Nominated | |
| 1997 | Best Male Rock Vocal Performance | "Dead Man Walkin'" | Nominated | |
| 1997 | Best Music Video, Long Form | Blood Brothers | Nominated | |
| 1997 | Best Contemporary Folk Album | The Ghost of Tom Joad | Won | |
| 1998 | Best Male Rock Vocal Performance | "Thunder Road" | Nominated | |
| 2000 | Best Rock Song | "The Promise" | Nominated | |
| 2000 | Best Male Rock Vocal Performance | "The Promise" | Nominated | |
| 2003 | Album of the Year | The Rising | Nominated | |
| 2003 | Best Rock Album | The Rising | Won | |
| 2003 | Song of the Year | "The Rising" | Nominated | |
| 2003 | Best Male Rock Vocal Performance | "The Rising" | Won | |
| 2003 | Best Rock Song | "The Rising" | Won | |
| 2004 | Best Rock Performance by a Duo or Group with Vocal | "Disorder in The House" (with Warren Zevon) | Won | |
| 2005 | Best Rock Vocal Solo Performance | "Code of Silence" | Won | |
| 2006 | Best Contemporary Folk Album | Devils & Dust | Nominated | |
| 2006 | Best Long Form Music Video | Devils & Dust | Nominated | |
| 2006 | Song of the Year | "Devils & Dust" | Nominated | |
| 2006 | Best Rock Song | "Devils & Dust" | Nominated | |
| 2006 | Best Rock Vocal Solo Performance | "Devils & Dust" | Won | |
| 2007 | Best Traditional Folk Album | We Shall Overcome: The Seeger Sessions | Won | |
| 2007 | Best Long Form Music Video | "Wings for Wheels: The Making of Born to Run" | Won | |
| 2008 | Best Rock Album | Magic | Nominated | |
| 2008 | Best Solo Rock Vocal Performance | "Radio Nowhere" | Won | |
| 2008 | Best Rock Song | "Radio Nowhere" | Won | |
| 2008 | Best Rock Instrumental Performance | "Once Upon a Time in the West" | Won | |
| 2009 | Best Rock Song | "Girls in Their Summer Clothes" | Won | |
| 2009 | Best Solo Rock Vocal Performance | "Girls in Their Summer Clothes" | Nominated | |
| 2010 | Best Song Written for Visual Media | "The Wrestler" (from the film 'The Wrestler') | Nominated | |
| 2010 | Best Pop Collaboration with Vocals | "Sea of Heartbreak" (with Rosanne Cash) | Nominated | |
| 2010 | Best Rock Song | "Working on a Dream" | Nominated | |
| 2010 | Best Solo Rock Vocal Performance | "Working on a Dream" | Won | |
| 2013 | Best Rock Performance | "We Take Care of Our Own" | Nominated | |
| 2013 | Best Rock Song | "We Take Care of Our Own" | Won | |
| 2013 | Best Rock Album | Wrecking Ball | Won | |
| 2018 | Best Spoken Word Album | Born to Run | Nominated | |
| 2023 | Best Traditional Pop Vocal Album | Only the Strong Survive | Nominated | |
Grammy Hall of Fame
| 2003 | Grammy Hall of Fame | Born to Run | Won | |
| 2012 | Grammy Hall of Fame | Born in the U.S.A. | Won | |
| 2021 | Grammy Hall of Fame | Greetings from Asbury Park, N.J. | Won | |

=== Tony Awards ===
| Year | Category | Nominated work | Result | Ref. |
|---|---|---|---|---|
| 2018 | Special Tony Award | Himself | Honored | |

== Miscellaneous awards ==
| Award | Year | Category | Nominated work | Result | Ref. |
|---|---|---|---|---|---|
| American Music Awards | 1985 | Favorite Pop/Rock Male Artist | Himself | Nominated | |
| American Music Awards | 1985 | Favorite Pop/Rock Song | "Dancing in the Dark" | Won | |
| American Music Awards | 1985 | Favorite Pop/Rock Male Video Artist | Himself | Nominated | |
| American Music Awards | 1986 | Favorite Pop/Rock Male Artist | Himself | Won | |
| American Music Awards | 1986 | Favorite Pop/Rock Album | Born in the U.S.A. | Won | |
| American Music Awards | 1986 | Favorite Pop/Rock Male Video Artist | Himself | Won | |
| American Music Awards | 2016 | Tour of the Year | The River Tour 2016 | Nominated | |
| Audie Awards | 2018 | Best Autobiography/Memoir | Born to Run | Won | |
| Brit Awards | 1985 | International Artist | Himself | Nominated | |
| Brit Awards | 1986 | International Solo Artist | Himself | Won | |
| Brit Awards | 1987 | International Solo Artist | Himself | Nominated | |
| Brit Awards | 2003 | International Male Solo Artist | Himself | Nominated | |
| Brit Awards | 2006 | International Male Solo Artist | Himself | Nominated | |
| Brit Awards | 2008 | International Male Solo Artist | Himself | Nominated | |
| Brit Awards | 2010 | International Male Solo Artist | Himself | Nominated | |
| Brit Awards | 2011 | International Male Solo Artist | Himself | Nominated | |
| Brit Awards | 2013 | International Male Solo Artist | Himself | Nominated | |
| Brit Awards | 2020 | International Male Solo Artist | Himself | Nominated | |
| Ivor Novello Awards | 2024 | Academy Fellowship | Himself | Won | |
| Juno Awards | 1985 | International Album of the Year | Born in the U.S.A. | Won | |
| Juno Awards | 1993 | International Entertainer of the Year | Himself | Nominated | |
| MTV Video Music Awards | 1985 | Best Male Video | "I'm on Fire" | Won | |
| MTV Video Music Awards | 1985 | Best Stage Performance | "Dancing in the Dark" | Won | |
| MTV Video Music Awards | 1985 | Best Overall Performance | "Dancing in the Dark" | Nominated | |
| MTV Video Music Awards | 1985 | Viewer's Choice | "We Are the World" | Won | |
| MTV Video Music Awards | 1986 | Best Male Video | "Glory Days" | Nominated | |
| MTV Video Music Awards | 1986 | Best Overall Performance | "Glory Days" | Nominated | |
| MTV Video Music Awards | 1987 | Best Stage Performance | "Born to Run" | Nominated | |
| MTV Video Music Awards | 1987 | Best Stage Performance | "War" | Nominated | |
| MTV Video Music Awards | 1988 | Video of the Year | "Tunnel of Love" | Nominated | |
| MTV Video Music Awards | 1988 | Best Male Video | "Tunnel of Love" | Nominated | |
| MTV Video Music Awards | 1988 | Viewer's Choice | "Tunnel of Love" | Nominated | |
| MTV Video Music Awards | 1992 | "Human Touch" | Best Male Video | Nominated | |
| MTV Video Music Awards | 1994 | Best Male Video | "Streets of Philadelphia" | Nominated | |
| MTV Video Music Awards | 1994 | Best Video from a Film | "Streets of Philadelphia" | Won | |
| MTV Video Music Awards | 1997 | Best Video from a Film | "Secret Garden" | Nominated | |

== Honorary awards ==
| Organizations | Year | Award | Result | Ref. |
|---|---|---|---|---|
| Stig Anderson Music Foundation | 1997 | Polar Music Prize | Honored | |
| Rock and Roll Hall of Fame | 1999 | Induction | Honored | |
| Songwriters Hall of Fame | 1999 | Induction | Honored | |
| New Jersey Hall of Fame | 2007 | Induction | Honored | |
| New Zealand | 1999 | The minor planet 23990 was named in his honor (Note: discovered September 4, 1999, by I. P. Griffin at Auckland, New Zealand, was named in his honor.) | Honored | |
| Rolling Stone Magazine | 2004 | Ranked No. 23 of the 100 Greatest Artists of All Time | Honored | |
| Time Magazine | 2008 | 100 Most Influential People of the Year | Honored | |
| John F. Kennedy Center for the Performing Arts | 2009 | Kennedy Center Honors | Honored | |
| Forbes Magazine | 2009 | Ranked 6th in The Celebrity 100 | Honored | |
| Ellis Island Foundation | 2010 | Family Heritage Award | Honored | |
| MusiCares | 2013 | Person of the Year | Honored | |
| President Barack Obama | 2016 | Presidential Medal of Freedom | Honored | |
| Woody Guthrie Center | 2021 | Woody Guthrie Prize | Honored | |
| President Joe Biden | 2023 | National Medal of Arts | Honored | |
| The Ivors Academy | 2024 | Academy Fellow (Note: Springsteen will be the first-ever international songwriter that the Academy has inducted into the Fellowship in its 80-year history.) | Honored | |
| Academy Museum of Motion Pictures | 2025 | Legacy Award | Honored | |
| American Civil Liberties Union | 2026 | Ralph Ellison Award for Defenders of Civil Rights and Civil Liberties in the Arts, Business, Science, and Sports | Honored | |

Other honors

- September 23, his birthday, recognized as Bruce Springsteen Day in New Jersey starting in 2023
- Monmouth University has held academic symposia in which scholars present on Springsteen's work, and the university houses the Bruce Springsteen Archives and Center for American Music
