= The Virginia EP =

EP by The National
- Released: May 20, 2008
- Genres: Indie rock; post-punk revival
- Length: 48:39
- Label: Beggars Banquet Records
- Producers: The National and Peter Katis

The National chronology
Boxer (2007)	The Virginia EP (2008)	High Violet (2010)

The Virginia EP is an EP and compilation album by American indie rock band The National, released on May 20, 2008 on Beggars Banquet Records. The release includes B-sides, demo recordings and live recordings relating to the band's fourth studio album, Boxer (2007). The CD version of the release includes a DVD featuring the documentary film A Skin, A Night by filmmaker Vincent Moon. A vinyl edition of The Virginia EP was issued in January 2013.

Professional ratings
Review scores
Source	Rating
Pitchfork	(4.3/10)

== Track listing ==
All tracks are written by The National, except where noted.

No.	Title	Writer(s)	Length
1.	"You've Done It Again, Virginia"		3:09
2.	"Santa Clara"		4:05
3.	"Blank Slate"		3:15
4.	"Tall Saint" (Demo)		3:44
5.	"Without Permission"	Caroline Martin	3:37
6.	"Forever After Days" (Demo)		3:01
7.	"Rest of Years" (Demo)		3:40
8.	"Slow Show" (Demo)		3:28
9.	"Lucky You" (Daytrotter Session)		3:56
10.	"Mansion on the Hill" (Live)	Bruce Springsteen	4:38
11.	"Fake Empire" (Live)		3:41
12.	"About Today" (Live)		8:25

== Personnel ==
=== The National ===
- Matt Berninger
- Aaron Dessner
- Bryce Dessner
- Scott Devendorf
- Bryan Devendorf

=== Additional musicians ===
- Sufjan Stevens (1)
- Marla Hansen (2)
- Carin Besser – vocals (7)
- Marc Meeuwissen – trombone (11 and 12)
- Tom Verschooren – trombone (11 and 12)
- John Birdsong – cornet (11 and 12)

=== Recording personnel ===
- Peter Katis – recording and mixing (1, 2, 3, 4 and 7)
- Brandon Reid – vocal recording (1, 2, 3 and 4)
- Bennett Paster – piano recording (1, 2, 3 and 4)
- Oliver Straus – recording and mixing (5)
- Aaron Dessner – recording (6 and 8)
- Bryce Dessner – recording (6)
- Patrick Stolley – sound engineering (9)
- Ed Haber – recording (10)
- Adam Goldfried – mixing (10)
- David Spelman – mixing (10)
- Stef Van Alsenoy – recording (11 and 12)
- Joel Hamburger – mixing (11 and 12)
- Noah Mintz – mastering

=== Artwork ===
- Vincent Moon – photography
