= Double Sextet =

2007 composition by Steve Reich

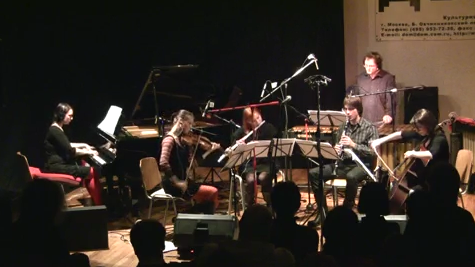
Performance of Double Sextet in Russia

Double Sextet is a composition by Steve Reich scored for two sextets of flute, clarinet, violin, cello, vibraphone and piano. It won the 2009 Pulitzer Prize for Music, the first for the composer.

With funds from the Carnegie Hall Corporation, The Abe Fortas Memorial Fund of the John F. Kennedy Center for the Performing Arts, the Liverpool Culture Company – European Capital of Culture 2008, the Modlin Center for the Arts at the University of Richmond, the Orange County Performing Arts Center, the University of Cincinnati College-Conservatory of Music – Music 08 Festival, the Double Sextet was commissioned in 2007 by the ensemble Eighth Blackbird, who performed its premiere in 2008 at the University of Richmond in Virginia.. The Liverpool Culture Company (Gordon Ross, music programme manager) was the only non-US commissioning organisation and hosted the rest-of-the-world premiere at St. George's Concert Room, Liverpool on the 21st of November 2008 as part of Liverpool's European Capital of Culture celebrations.

== Structure ==
The Double Sextet is in three movements, lasting about 22 minutes in its entirety:

1. Fast
2. Slow
3. Fast

The piece is strongly driven by the two pianos and the two vibraphones, marking out each phrase and key change, particularly in the fast movements. Within each movement are four harmonic sections in the keys of D, F, A♭ and B (or their relative minors), similar to many of Reich's works; the reason being that the sections eventually return to the original key.

The interlocking piano rhythm themes occur throughout the piece. The pianos interlock, creating the effect of constant eighth-note chords.

== Performance ==
The piece is either played by 12 musicians in total (2 sextets) or one sextet and tape, playing against a recording of themselves, the latter being more popular due to less demand for space and players.

The piece has been recorded by the ensemble Eighth Blackbird and was released on CD on September 14, 2010 along with "2×5".
