= The Creatures in the Garden of Lady Walton =

Studio album by Clogs
- Released: 2 March 2010
- Recorded: 2007–08
- Genre: Post-rock, alternative rock, classical
- Length: 42:17
- Label: Brassland Records

Clogs chronology
Lantern (2006)	The Creatures in the Garden of Lady Walton (2010)

Professional ratings
Review scores
Source	Rating
AllMusic	3.5/5 stars
Pitchfork	(8.2/10)
Metacritic	(78/100)
Under the Radar	(7/10)
All About Jazz	(4.5/5)

The Creatures in the Garden of Lady Walton is an album by Clogs, released in March 2010. This is their first non-instrumental album, featuring several guest singers, including Shara Worden, singer and songwriter of the indie rock band My Brightest Diamond, Matt Berninger, lead singer of Clogs' sister band the National and Sufjan Stevens, a prominent indie folk singer/songwriter.

The name of the album is a reference to La Mortella, a private garden on the Italian island of Ischia created by Lady Susana Walton, wife of composer William Walton.

== Track listing ==
All songs written by Padma Newsome.

1. "Cocodrillo" – 1:50
2. "I Used to Do" – 4:35
3. "On the Edge" – 4:01
4. "Red Seas" – 6:13
5. "The Owl of Love" – 4:11
6. "Adages of Cleansing" – 5:54
7. "Last Song" – 3:59
8. "To Hugo" – 4:27
9. "Raise the Flag" – 2:47
10. "We Were Here" – 4:22

== Personnel ==
- Padma Newsome: violin, viola, mandola, celeste, voice
- Bryce Dessner: guitars, mandola, ukulele
- Aaron Dessner: guitar, bass guitar
- Thomas Kozumplik: percussion
- Rachael Elliott: bassoon
- Shara Worden: voice
- Matt Berninger: voice
- Sufjan Stevens: voice, banjo
- Sue Newsome: clarinet
- Michael Atkinson: horn
- Kyle Resnick: trumpet
- Osso String Quartet: Ha-yang Kim: cello, Irena Havel: viola da gamba, Vojtech Havel: viola da gambas, Luca Tarantino: baroque guitar, theorbo.
