= Stolley =

Stolley is a surname. Notable people with the surname include:

- Patrick Stolley (born 1970), American audio engineer, singer, songwriter, and producer
- Richard Stolley (1928–2021), American journalist and magazine editor

== See also ==
- Stolle, surname
