= Boxer (The National album) =

2007 studio album by the National

Studio album by The National
- Released: May 22, 2007
- Studios: Tarquin Studios, Bridgeport, Connecticut
- Genres: Indie rock; folk rock; post-punk revival
- Length: 43:07
- Label: Beggars Banquet
- Producers: Peter Katis; The National

The National chronology
Alligator (2005)	Boxer (2007)	The Virginia EP (2008)

Singles from Boxer
- 1. "Mistaken for Strangers" Released: April 30, 2007; 2. "Apartment Story" Released: November 5, 2007; 3. "Fake Empire" Released: June 23, 2008

Boxer is the fourth studio album by American indie rock band the National, released on May 22, 2007, on Beggars Banquet Records. Following its release, the album debuted at number 68 on the U.S. Billboard 200, selling about 9,500 copies in its first week.

A documentary film, titled A Skin, A Night, was released the following year. Focusing on the recording process of Boxer, the film was directed by independent filmmaker Vincent Moon, and released in conjunction with a collection of B-sides, demos and live recordings, titled The Virginia EP, on May 20, 2008.

== Background and recording ==
The band recorded Boxer with producer Peter Katis, with vocalist Matt Berninger stating, "We recorded a lot of it at home. Probably half and half of home recording and recording with Peter in the studio. We always kind of work that way, going in and out of studios and then back home. We have little home set-ups. He has been a big part of the band for awhile, [sic] at least in the recording of the records. He kind of jumps in as a seventh member."

Singer-songwriter and multi-instrumentalist Sufjan Stevens appears on the tracks, "Racing Like a Pro" and "Ada". Regarding his recording contributions, Berninger noted, "Bryce has played a lot with [Sufjan’s] touring band, so Bryce knows him really well. And [Sufjan] lives in the same neighborhood that Bryce and Aaron live in. They just called him and he came over for a day. It was a one-day collaboration. Him, Bryce and Aaron hang out a lot and make little songs together, so it was really a kind of casual type of collaboration."

== Writing and composition ==
The track "Slow Show" contains lyrics from the band's song "29 Years", which previously appeared on their self-titled debut album.

== Artwork ==
The album cover is a photo of the band performing the tracks "The Geese of Beverly Road" and "Daughters of the Soho Riots" from the band's previous album, Alligator (2005), at producer Peter Katis's wedding.

== Promotion ==
The National made their television debut on July 24, 2007, performing "Fake Empire" on the Late Show with David Letterman. The band later performed "Apartment Story" on The Late Late Show with Craig Ferguson on September 26, 2007.

== Reception ==
Professional ratings
Aggregate scores
Source	Rating
Metacritic	86/100
Review scores
Source	Rating
AllMusic	4/5 stars
The A.V. Club	A
The Guardian	3/5 stars
The Irish Times	4/5 stars
Mojo	4/5 stars
NME	7/10
Pitchfork	8.6/10
Rolling Stone	4/5 stars
Slant Magazine	5/5 stars
Spin	4/5 stars

Boxer received widespread acclaim from music critics. In the year-end issue of Paste the album was named the best record of 2007. "Mistaken for Strangers" was number 92 on Rolling Stone's list of "The 100 Best Songs of 2007". Popular internet publication Pitchfork ranked the album number 17 in their annual end-of-the-year "Top 50 Albums of 2007" list, as well as on Stylus Magazine's "Top 50 Albums of 2007" list at number 5. Stylus also ranked "Fake Empire" at number 7 on their "Top 50 Songs of 2007" list. Boxer also garnered the top position on WOXY.com's "97 Best of 2007".

Boxer has made numerous "albums of the decade" lists including Pitchfork, Aquarium Drunkard, and Paste. In 2019, the album was ranked 68th on The Guardian's 100 Best Albums of the 21st Century list.

== Track listing ==
Boxer track listing
No.	Title	Writer(s)	Length
1.	"Fake Empire"	Matt Berninger, Bryce Dessner	3:25
2.	"Mistaken for Strangers"	Berninger, Aaron Dessner, B. Dessner	3:30
3.	"Brainy"	Berninger, Carin Besser, A. Dessner	3:18
4.	"Squalor Victoria"	Berninger, B. Dessner	2:59
5.	"Green Gloves"	Berninger, A. Dessner	3:39
6.	"Slow Show"	Berninger, A. Dessner, B. Dessner	4:08
7.	"Apartment Story"	Berninger, A. Dessner	3:32
8.	"Start a War"	Berninger, A. Dessner	3:16
9.	"Guest Room"	Berninger, B. Dessner	3:18
10.	"Racing Like a Pro"	Berninger, A. Dessner, B. Dessner	3:23
11.	"Ada"	Berninger, Besser, Scott Devendorf	4:03
12.	"Gospel"	Berninger, Carin Besser, A. Dessner	4:29

Japanese CD and iTunes bonus tracks
No.	Title	Writer(s)	Length
13.	"Blank Slate"	Berninger, A. Dessner, Devendorf	3:17
14.	"Santa Clara"	Berninger, A. Dessner	4:06

== Personnel ==
The National

- Matt Berninger
- Aaron Dessner
- Bryce Dessner
- Bryan Devendorf
- Scott Devendorf

Additional personnel

- Produced by Peter Katis and The National
- Additional production by Aaron Dessner
- Recorded and mixed by Peter Katis at Tarquin Studios, Bridgeport, Connecticut
- Second engineer: Greg Georgio; assisted by Nathan Curry and Cory Foley-Marsello
- Home recording by The National and Brandon Reid in Brooklyn, New York and White Sulphur Springs, West Virginia
- Additional recording by Greg Georgio and Josh Clark at The Seaside Lounge, and Bennett Paster at Benny's Wash n' Dry, Brooklyn
- Mastered by Fred Kevorkian at Kevorkian Mastering, New York, New York
- Orchestration by Padma Newsome
- Additional arrangements by Bryce Dessner and Aaron Dessner
- Cover photo by Abbey Drucker
- Interior photos by Clara Claus
- Design by Distant Station Ltd.

Additional musicians

- Tim Albright – trombone
- Thomas Bartlett – keyboards, accordion
- Carin Besser – vocals on "Apartment Story"
- CJ Camerieri – trumpet
- Rachael Elliott – bassoon
- Pauline de Lassus – vocals
- Marla Hansen – vocals
- Ha-Yang Kim – cello
- Padma Newsome – viola, violin, organ
- Sara Phillips – clarinet
- Alex Sopp – flute
- Sufjan Stevens – piano on "Racing Like a Pro" and "Ada"
- Jeb Wallace – French horn

== Charts ==
Chart performance for Boxer
Chart (2007)	Peak position
Belgian Albums (Ultratop Flanders)	32
Finnish Albums (Suomen virallinen lista)	23
French Albums (SNEP)	90
Irish Albums (IRMA)	31
Swedish Albums (Sverigetopplistan)	53
Swiss Albums (Schweizer Hitparade)	85
UK Albums (Official Charts)	57
US Billboard 200	68

== Certifications ==
Region	Certification	Certified units/sales
United Kingdom (BPI)	Gold	100,000^{‡}
^{‡} Sales+streaming figures based on certification alone.

== 33 1/3 book ==
In April 2022, Boxer became the subject of an entry in the 33 1/3 book series (#162) released by Bloomsbury Publishing. Authored by Ryan Pinkard, the oral history chronicles the band's first years leading up to the recording and release of Boxer, and features extensive original interviews with The National, Peter Katis, Carin Besser, and numerous others involved in the album.
