= Lantern (Clogs album) =

Studio album by Clogs
- Released: February 7, 2006
- Recorded: February 2005
- Genre: Chamber music, Alternative rock
- Length: 50:19

Clogs chronology
| Stick Music (2004) | Lantern (2006) | The Creatures in the Garden of Lady Walton (2010) |

Professional ratings
Review scores
| Source | Rating |
|---|---|
| Pitchfork Media | (8.2/10) |

Lantern is an album by Clogs, released in 2006.

== Track listing ==
1. "Kapsburger" – 2:05
2. "Canon" – 4:15
3. "5/4" – 2:42
4. "2:3:5" – 5:14
5. "Death and the Maiden" – 6:22
6. "Lantern" – 5:47
7. "Tides of Washington Bridge" – 4:07
8. "The Song of the Cricket" – 4:44
9. "Fiddlegree" – 3:37
10. "Compass" – 4:56
11. "Voisins" – 2:52
12. "Tides (Piano)" – 3:20
