= The Ascension (Sufjan Stevens album) =

Studio album by Sufjan Stevens
- Released: September 25, 2020
- Genre: Electropop
- Length: 80:30
- Label: Asthmatic Kitty
- Producer: Sufjan Stevens

Sufjan Stevens chronology
Aporia (2020)	The Ascension (2020)	Convocations (2021)

Singles from The Ascension
- 1. "America" Released: July 3, 2020; 2. "Video Game" Released: August 13, 2020; 3. "Sugar" Released: September 15, 2020

The Ascension is the eighth studio album by American musician Sufjan Stevens. It was released through Asthmatic Kitty on September 25, 2020. The record was influenced by a range of artists, particularly Ariana Grande and her 2018 song "Thank U, Next".

== Music and lyrics ==
NPR's Lindsay Zoladz describes The Ascension as "an 80-minute meditation that revisits nearly every one of the grand themes he has explored during his two-decade career: Love, death, faith, desire, place, country, apocalypse, resurrection."

== Release ==
The album's lead single, "America", was released on July 3, 2020. A second single, "Video Game", was released on August 13 along with a music video choreographed by Jalaiah Harmon. A third single, "Sugar", and its music video were released on September 15.

== Critical reception ==
Professional ratings
Aggregate scores
Source	Rating
AnyDecentMusic?	7.9/10
Metacritic	80/100
Review scores
Source	Rating
AllMusic	4/5 stars
The A.V. Club	B
Exclaim!	10/10
The Independent	5/5 stars
Mojo	3/5 stars
NME	4/5 stars
Paste	8.0/10
Pitchfork	7.0/10
Record Collector	5/5 stars
Slant Magazine	3/5 stars

The Ascension received positive reviews upon its release. At Metacritic, which assigns a normalized score out of 100 to ratings from publications, the album received an average score of 80 based on 25 reviews, indicating "generally favorable reviews". Music critic Tom Hull gave it an A-minus and said "singer-songwriter" may be "too self-limiting" a designation for Stevens, who "is a pop composer of grand sweep and delicate bearing, an heir to Brian Wilson working on if anything a broader canvas. His is not a style I'm fond of, but half of these songs click for me, and the others seem to be lurking in the depths, awaiting their moment." Pitchfork's Sam Sodomsky, however, was more tempered in his praise, noting: "But despite its allusions to pop music escapism, The Ascension is, by design, kind of a drag: a dark and emotionally distant mood piece whose lyrics rarely touch on the specifics necessary to anchor the music, and whose music is rarely exciting enough to elevate his words."

=== Year-end lists ===
Publications' year-end list appearances for The Ascension
Critic/Publication	List	Rank	Ref
Consequence of Sound	Top 50 Albums of 2020	19	
Double J	Top 50 Albums of 2020	30	
Exclaim!	Top 50 Best Albums of 2020	20	
Mojo	Top 75 Albums of 2020	50	
The New York Times (Jon Pareles)	Best Albums of 2020	1	
Slant Magazine	Top 50 Albums of 2020	17	
Under the Radar	Top 100 Albums of 2020	13	

== Track listing ==
All tracks are written by Sufjan Stevens.

The Ascension track listing
No.	Title	Length
1.	"Make Me an Offer I Cannot Refuse"	5:18
2.	"Run Away with Me"	4:07
3.	"Video Game"	4:15
4.	"Lamentations"	3:42
5.	"Tell Me You Love Me"	4:21
6.	"Die Happy"	5:46
7.	"Ativan"	6:32
8.	"Ursa Major"	3:42
9.	"Landslide"	5:04
10.	"Gilgamesh"	3:50
11.	"Death Star"	4:04
12.	"Goodbye to All That"	3:48
13.	"Sugar"	7:36
14.	"The Ascension"	5:56
15.	"America"	12:29

== Personnel ==
- Sufjan Stevens – vocals (all tracks), drums and percussion (all tracks), Tempest (1–13, 15), electric guitar (1, 5, 7, 8, 10, 11, 13, 15), Prophet '08 (all tracks), Prophet 6 (1–11, 13, 15), Prophet X (1, 4, 7–9, 13–15), piano (2, 5, 14, 15), recorders (11, 15); performance, recording, engineering, arrangement, mixing, production; all original art, layout, design, typography
- Casey Foubert – bass guitar (1, 3, 5, 7, 9, 10, 12, 13), vibraphone (1), electric guitar (2, 4, 6–8, 11), lead electric guitar (9, 10, 15); recording and engineering (own contributions)
- Bryce Dessner – electric guitar (1)
- Emil Nikolaisen – black magic (1, 8); engineering (own contributions)
- James McAlister – additional drums and percussion (3–6), vocal cut-up effects (4); recording and engineering (own contributions)
- TW Walsh – mastering

== Charts ==
Chart performance for The Ascension
Chart (2020)	Peak position
Australian Albums (ARIA)	28
Belgian Albums (Ultratop Flanders)	28
Belgian Albums (Ultratop Wallonia)	107
Dutch Albums (Album Top 100)	59
French Albums (SNEP)	143
German Albums (Offizielle Top 100)	26
Irish Albums (Official Charts)	48
Portuguese Albums (AFP)	34
Scottish Albums (Official Charts)	15
Spanish Albums (PROMUSICAE)	96
Swiss Albums (Schweizer Hitparade)	44
UK Albums (Official Charts)	35
UK Independent Albums (Official Charts)	7
US Billboard 200	90
US Top Alternative Albums (Billboard)	9
US Americana/Folk Albums (Billboard)	1
US Independent Albums (Billboard)	31
US Top Rock Albums (Billboard)	18
US Indie Store Album Sales (Billboard)	2
