= Thirteen Ways of Looking at a Blackbird =

Poem by Wallace Stevens

"Thirteen Ways of Looking at a Blackbird" is a poem from Wallace Stevens's first book of poetry, Harmonium. The poem consists of thirteen short, separate sections, each of which mentions blackbirds in some way. Although inspired by haiku, none of the sections meets the traditional definition of haiku. It was first published in October 1917 by Alfred Kreymborg in Others: An Anthology of the New Verse and two months later in the December issue of Others: A Magazine of the New Verse.

== Analysis ==
The literary scholar Beverly Maeder writing for the Cambridge Companion to Wallace Stevens speaks of the importance the author placed upon linguistic structure in many of his poems. In this instance, Stevens is experimenting with the application of the verb 'to be' in its many forms and conjugations throughout the 13 cantos of the poem. As Maeder states, the poem "uses or even focuses on 'to be' in seven of its thirteen variations on the blackbird. The blackbird is pictured in a different situation and articulated in a different grammatical context in each fragment. The variations give us glimpses of winter landscapes (cantos I, VI, and XIII), but also of a geometrical world turned metaphysical when the blackbird 'mark(s) the edge / Of one of many circles', or of a train ride turned fairy tale in which a 'glass coach' becomes an equipage', among other situations."

The poem's haiku-like austerity is striking. Affinities to imagism and cubism are evident. Buttel proposes that the title "alludes humorously to the Cubists' practice of incorporating into unity and stasis a number of possible views of the subject observed over a span of time".

Sight is the dominant perceptual modality. Perception shifts from the general landscape to the particular image of the blackbird, shifting both poetic and perceptual focus so that background & scenery becomes foreground. The concrete object takes both visual and metaphysical precedence. Some readers see some reason to classify it as among the metaphysical poems in Harmonium. But Stevens dismisses metaphysics in his 1948 essay "Imagination as Value", when he approvingly quotes Professor Joad's assertion that "all talk about God, whether pro or anti, is twaddle", and then Stevens adds, "What is true of one metaphysical term is true of all" There are better grounds for classifying it as among the book's sensualist poems. "This group of poems is not meant to be a collection of epigrams or of ideas", Stevens remarks in one of his letters, "but of sensations".

Stevens, in his essay "Three Academic Pieces" (1947), begins by saying:

"The accuracy of accurate letters is an accuracy with respect to the structure of reality.
"Thus, if we desire to formulate an accurate theory of poetry, we find it necessary to examine the structure of reality, because reality is the central reference for poetry. By way of accomplishing this, suppose we examine one of the significant components of the structure of reality--that is to say, the resemblance between things."

Stevens' term "resemblance" refers to those relations of similarity and contrast, as he goes on to demonstrate in that essay. A more technical word for what he is referring to is "organic form." Stevens was cautious of the word "form" used to mean a prefabricated structure: "So it comes to this, I suppose, that I believe in freedom regardless of form".

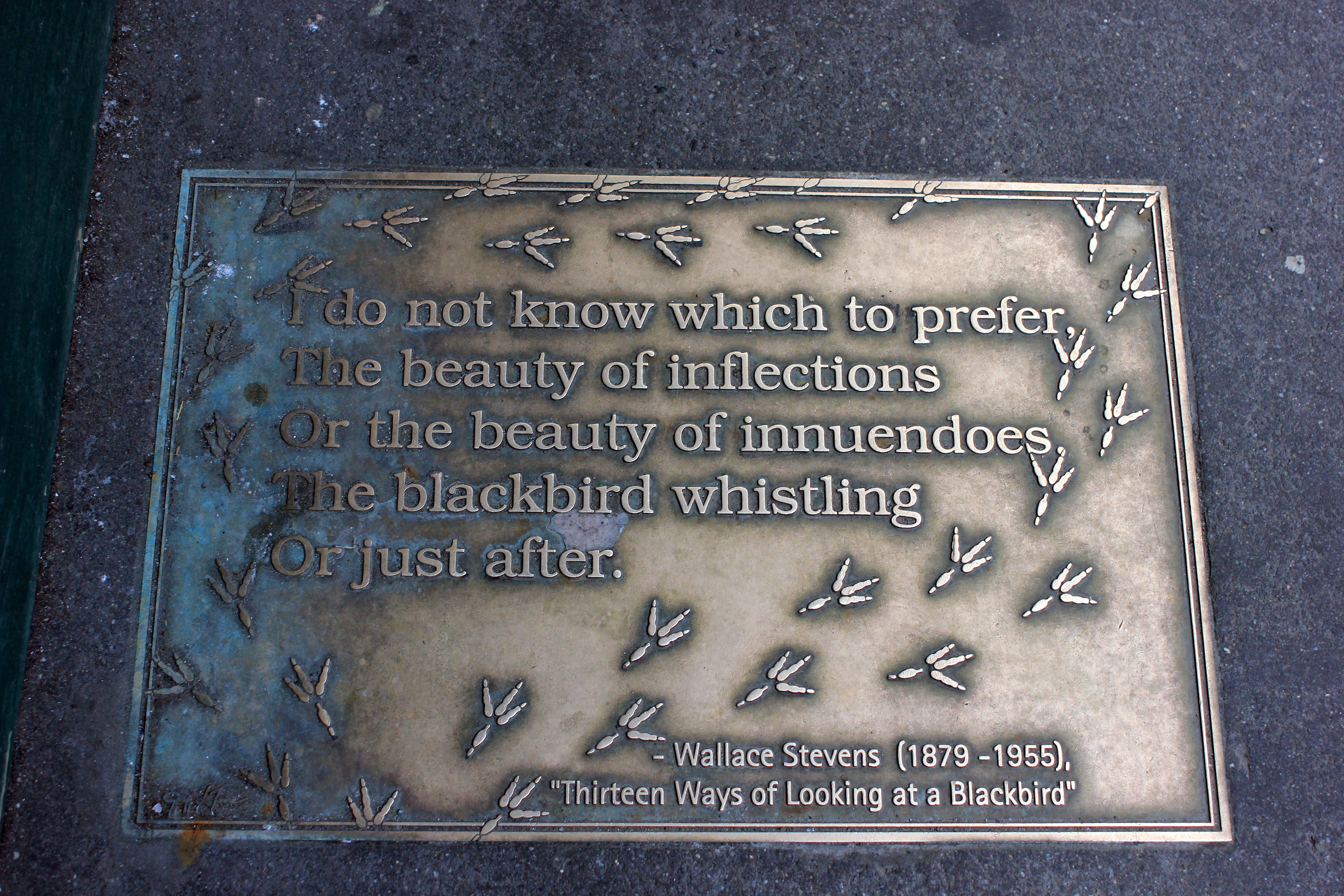
Plaque in New York, with section five of "Thirteen Ways of Looking at a Blackbird".

== Cultural influence ==
The poem has inspired a number of musicians, including the American contemporary music ensemble Eighth Blackbird which derived their name from the poem's eighth stanza which makes references to "noble accents/And lucid, inescapable rhythms", and inspired several specific compositions as well:

- "Thirteen Ways of Looking at a Blackbird" for soprano voice and chamber ensemble (1959), by Alejandro Planchart
- "Thirteen Ways of Looking at a Blackbird" (1978), by Lukas Foss
- Thirteen Ways, by Thomas Albert;
- "Thirteen Ways of Looking at a Blackbird", by James Tenney
- "Thirteen Ways of Looking at a Blackbird" (1979), by Louise Talma for tenor/soprano voice, oboe/flute, and piano;
- "Thirteen Ways of Looking at a Blackbird", by Jeff Davis, for mixed chorus, solo 'cello, and percussion quartet.
- "Thirteen Other Ways of Looking at a Blackbird" (Piano Sonata No. 2) by Charles Bestor.
- Blackbirds, for Flute and Bassoon, Gregory Youtz.; and
- "Thirteen Ways of Looking at a Blackbird", by Travis M. Ramsey, commissioned by Patricia Norton for the Juneberry Community Chorus at the Upper Valley Music Center.

Additionally, the title "Thirteen Ways of Looking at a..." has been endlessly paraphrased in articles (e.g. "Thirteen Ways of Looking at a Blackout", music album-titles (e.g. "Thirteen Ways of Looking at the Goldberg"), and anywhere else a particular topic seems to bear examination from a number of different perspectives.

The poem has influenced works of fiction including Ken Chowder's 1980 novel Blackbird Days, a 2015 novella by Colum McCann titled "Thirteen Ways of Looking," and a 2025 play, "Thirteen Ways," by Maria Brandt.

Welsh poet R. S. Thomas wrote a parody of the poem, reversing the perspective as "Thirteen Blackbirds Look at a Man".
