= A Good Person (soundtrack) =

2023 soundtrack albums

The music to the 2023 drama film A Good Person, directed by Zach Braff, featured two soundtracks: A Good Person (Music from the Original Motion Picture) is the soundtrack to the 2023 film featuring the compilation of popular hits by various artists, and two original songs written by Florence Pugh as Allison. A Good Person (Original Motion Picture Soundtrack) consists of the film's original score composed by Bryce Dessner. Both the soundtrack and the score albums were released on March 24, 2023 by Mercury Classics, the same date as the film's release.

== Soundtrack ==
A Good Person (Music from the Original Motion Picture)

Soundtrack album by various artists
- Released: March 24, 2023
- Length: 42:34
- Label: Mercury Classics
- Producer: Zach Braff

=== Background ===
The film featured songs curated by the director Zach Braff, as he did for his previous ventures. The protagonist Allison (Pugh) loves music even during her darkest times, according to Braff. Hence Pugh asked her costume designer Terry Duncan, to design T-shirts of Fleetwood Mac, Nick Cave and the Bad Seeds, The Velvet Underground amongst several others. Braff had no idea on how he cleared the rights to those T-shirts, though they had limited budget, but felt Pugh and Duncan's collaboration somehow "magically made it happen".

"[Music] is one of those things that can mean so much to you, and the less you do it, the less confidence you have and you end up losing your heart in it. For years I was so scared of how to do it. And eventually, this opportunity arose and I read Zach’s script and I said ‘I’ve been inspired to write a song.’ And we put them in the movie"

— Florence Pugh on the contribution to the film's music

Along with the compiled tracks, the film also had two original songs written and performed by Pugh as part of Allie's journey through recovery was through music. She recorded covers of popular songs on YouTube under the moniker "Flossie Rose" in 2021, and also collaborated with her brother Toby Sebastian for his single "Midnight". Furthermore Pugh contributed to the soundtrack of Don't Worry Darling (2022). In Pugh’s interview in W she said that she wrote the songs partly to process who she was and how low she felt, admitting that "I've never come close to feeling like this character before, nor do I know anyone that has. It was incredibly important to understand what she truly thought of herself."

On writing the track "I Hate Myself", she called it as a "wild and weird experience" on "trying to figure out what Allison sounds like, how she sounds in rehab after months of torturing herself, and really figuring out how broken she is on a creaky piano in this creaky room. It was a true way into this person." "The Best Part" was written about a healthier Allison, who tries to communicate with her ex-fiancé Nathan (Chinaza Uche) through a song. She had not worked with Uche for about a month, as they filmed many of their scenes together near the end of shooting. She wrote the song and sent it to Uche before they met up to do the rehab scene. Braff liked the song and admitted that "this is what she's going to be singing when she hasn't sang and she's performing [in public] for the first time."

She further considered the two songs as belonging equally to herself and to Allison, adding that she performed those songs in the film as Allison and once the filming wrapped, she took those tunes into the recording studio and performed it as Pugh, noting that "I got to do them in the way that I want them to be away from the movie. To be able to perform them as [my character] and perform as me was really lovely."

=== Release ===
The soundtrack to the film was released by Mercury Classics on March 24, 2023, the same date as the film's release. The soundtrack entitled A Good Person (Music from the Original Motion Picture) was not released in digital platforms such as Spotify, Apple and Amazon Music, amongst others. Instead, the album was released in a vinyl LP record.

The original songs written and performed by Pugh was released as a single album, titled Allison's Songs, containing the two tracks "I Hate Myself" and "The Best Part".

=== Track listing ===
No.	Title	Artist(s)	Length
1.	"After Hours"	The Velvet Underground	2:08
2.	"Time"	Angelo De Augustine	3:55
3.	"Hypochondriac"	Fenne Lily	3:12
4.	"Wake Up With the Sun"	Odessa Jorgensen	2:36
5.	"To the Mountains"	Lizzy McAlpine	3:14
6.	"A Love Song Seven Ways"	Benjamin Lazar Davis	3:11
7.	"Stardust"	Cary Brothers	4:55
8.	"Ode to a Conversation Stuck in Your Throat"	Del Water Gap	3:19
9.	"I Hate Myself"	Florence Pugh	4:02
10.	"The Best Part"	Florence Pugh	4:29
11.	"Deep in Love"	Bonny Light Horseman	5:05
12.	"On My Mind"	Leona Naess	2:28
Total length:			42:34

== Score ==
A Good Person (Original Motion Picture Soundtrack)

Film score by Bryce Dessner
- Released: March 24, 2023
- Length: 27:56
- Label: Mercury Classics
- Producer: Bryce Dessner

Bryce Dessner chronology
Bardo, False Chronicle of a Handful of Truths (2022)	A Good Person (2023)	She Came to Me (2023)

The film's score by Bryce Dessner was released as A Good Person (Original Motion Picture Soundtrack) by Mercury Classics on March 24, 2023.

=== Reception ===
Frank Scheck of The Hollywood Reporter complimented Dessner's "effective score" in Braff's "most assured work since his award-winning Garden State (2004)". Joey Magidson of Awards Radar wrote "composer Bryce Dessner matches the mood with music perfectly". Dan Bullock of Critical Popcorn wrote "This score fits in perfectly with the soundtrack itself and creates its own worlds through Dessner’s clever approach to reflecting and complimenting the complexity of the emotions that the film holds in such raw honesty. While some are momentary snippets of music, Dessner has created a beautiful score, packed full of heart and you can feel those distresses amongst the memories, which works because this is a score dipped in poignant reflection and immersive soundscapes."

=== Track listing ===
No.	Title	Length
1.	"Opening" (feat. Timo Anders)	1:25
2.	"Daniel Gets the News"	1:41
3.	"Allie Finds Out"	0:53
4.	"Allie Rides" (feat. Timo Anders)	1:38
5.	"Refill Attempt"	0:26
6.	"Bathroom Blackout"	1:07
7.	"A Friendly Lunch" (feat. Timo Anders)	0:21
8.	"I'm a Junkie" (feat. Timo Anders)	1:51
9.	"Daniel and the Bottle"	1:27
10.	"Daniel and Nathan"	0:19
11.	"I'm On Your Side"	0:55
12.	"Trying to Sleep"	0:46
13.	"Nathan's New Life"	0:54
14.	"Mouthful of Pills"	1:00
15.	"She's in Williamsburg"	4:36
16.	"Pawn Shop"	1:35
17.	"Daniel's Letter" (feat. Timo Anders)	4:36
18.	"A Good Person Main Theme" (feat. Timo Anders)	2:26
Total length:		27:56
