= She Came to Me =

2023 film by Rebecca Miller

- Theatrical release poster
- Directed by: Rebecca Miller
- Written by: Rebecca Miller
- Produced by: Damon Cardasis; Pamela Koffler; Christine Vachon; Rebecca Miller; Len Blavatnik; Anne Hathaway
- Starring: Peter Dinklage; Marisa Tomei; Joanna Kulig; Brian d'Arcy James; Anne Hathaway
- Cinematography: Sam Levy
- Edited by: Sabine Hoffman
- Music by: Bryce Dessner
- Production companies: AI Film; Round Films; Killer Films; Somewhere Pictures
- Distributed by: Vertical Entertainment
- Release dates: February 16, 2023 (Berlinale); October 6, 2023
- Running time: 102 minutes
- Country: United States
- Language: English
- Box office: $1.2 million

She Came to Me is a 2023 American romantic comedy film written and directed by Rebecca Miller. It stars Peter Dinklage, Marisa Tomei, Joanna Kulig, Brian d'Arcy James, and Anne Hathaway.

It had its world premiere at the 73rd Berlin International Film Festival on February 16, 2023, and was released on October 6, 2023, by Vertical Entertainment.

== Plot ==
Composer Steven Lauddem is creatively blocked and unable to finish the score for his big comeback opera. At the behest of his wife Patricia, a psychiatrist, he sets out in search of inspiration.

Taking their dog for a walk, Steven stops at a bar. There, he meets Katrina, who convinces him to go with her to see her tugboat, where she lives and works. She confesses that she is addicted to romance, and seduces Steven. Realizing he may be in danger, he hurries away.

The experience inspires Steven to write the work based on what happened, making her character a serial killer. On opening night, not only do Patricia and their son come, but so does Katrina. She approaches him, happily letting him know that she is now staying in Brooklyn; Steven hurries home, terrified.

Meanwhile, Patricia's son Julian and Tereza, whose mother Magdalena turns out to be his family's new cleaner, are dating. Neither set of parents knew about the relationship, so they make formal introductions. Tereza's stepdad Trey does not approve of his daughter's choice of a dark-skinned boyfriend. He threatens to prosecute Julian on statutory rape charges as Tereza is still underage and Julian has turned 18. As their lawyer comes for a consultation, Steven points out that Julian could not be prosecuted if they were married.

When Katrina approaches Steven in the street, he brushes her off, insisting she needs psychological help. She books a session with Patricia and the truth comes out. Not able to handle the news, Patricia has a psychotic break. Afterwards, Magdalena pauses her cleaning to join Julian, Steven, and a nun at Patricia's bedside. Julian requests she sign in person to authorize his marriage to Tereza in Delaware, where 16-year-olds can marry with a parent's signature.

Once it is decided, mother and daughter work together on how to get around Trey. In the meantime, knowing of Katrina's addiction to romance, Steven enlists her help to transport everyone to Delaware. Trey makes his wife and daughter participate in one of his Civil War reenactment battles. They feign they are collecting wood but instead run to Steven and the tugboat.

Trey has an APB sent out for them, to no avail. As Steven, Magdalena, and their kids settle in on their journey, it is suggested that Katrina become ordained online to officiate the ceremony. In the morning, Steven brings Katrina her coffee in the cockpit. He apologizes for judging her previously, admiring her strength and perseverance. Katrina in turn laments her role in pushing Pat off the deep end. Declaring he finally feels he has found true love, Steven passionately kisses her.

A year later, Steven has written a new opera set in space but obviously inspired by the Delaware wedding. The young married couple, Magdalena, Steven and Katrina, and Pat, now a nun, watch the premiere. In between parts of the work, snippets of the wedding are shown.

== Cast ==
- Peter Dinklage as Steven Lauddem
- Anne Hathaway as Patricia Jessup-Lauddem
- Marisa Tomei as Katrina Trento
- Evan Ellison as Julian Jessup
- Harlow Jane as Tereza Szyskowski
- Joanna Kulig as Magdalena Szyskowski
- Brian d'Arcy James as Trey Ruffa
- Judy Gold as Susan Shaw
- Gregg Edelman as Duftin Haverford
- Aalok Mehta as Anton Gatner
- Chris Gethard as Carl
- Dale Soules as Aunt Moxie
- Jen Ponton as Elodie

Isabel Leonard, Emmet O'Hanlon, and Greer Grimsley portray characters in Steven's operas.

== Production ==
In 2017, Steve Carell, Amy Schumer and Nicole Kidman were all attached to star in the film. In 2021, Anne Hathaway, Tahar Rahim, Marisa Tomei, Joanna Kulig and Matthew Broderick were confirmed to star in the film. Rahim and Broderick later left the project.

Principal photography was set to take place in late 2021 in New York City, but did not begin until April 2022.

== Release ==
The film opened the 73rd Berlin International Film Festival on February 16, 2023. International rights to the film, sold by Protagonist Pictures, sold out prior to the premiere to companies including Sky Cinema for the United Kingdom and Ireland and Shochiku for Japan; Universal Pictures Content Group closed a deal for distribution rights in Germany, Austria, Greece, Cyprus, Italy, Scandinavia, Iceland, Switzerland, Israel, the Middle East, South Africa, Turkey, Australia, New Zealand, Latin America, India, Indonesia, Malaysia, Brunei, Vietnam, Philippines, Singapore, Taiwan, Thailand, and Asian pay-TV. In May 2023, Vertical Entertainment acquired U.S. distribution rights to the film.

She Came to Me was theatrically released on October 6, 2023 and on digital platforms on November 10, 2023. It was previously scheduled to be released on September 29, 2023.

== Reception ==
On the review aggregator website Rotten Tomatoes, 48% of 67 critics' reviews are positive, with an average rating of 5.70/10. The website's consensus reads: "She Came to Me's uneasy blend of romantic comedy and drama proves frequently frustrating despite the story's admirable aims and strong work from an outrageously talented cast." Metacritic, which uses a weighted average, assigned the film a score of 53 out of 100, based on 20 critics, indicating "mixed or average" reviews.

=== Accolades ===
Award	Date of ceremony	Category	Nominee(s)	Result	Ref.
Hollywood Music in Media Awards	November 15, 2023	Best Original Score in an Independent Film	Bryce Dessner	Nominated	
Golden Globe Awards	January 7, 2024	Best Original Song	Bruce Springsteen and Patti Scialfa ("Addicted to Romance")	Nominated	

== See also ==
- She Came to Me (soundtrack)
