= A Skin, A Night =

- Directed by: Vincent Moon
- Produced by: Vincent Moon & Alexandre Perrier
- Starring: The National
- Music by: The National
- Release date: May 20, 2008
- Country: United States
- Language: English

A Skin, A Night is a 2008 documentary film featuring the American indie rock band The National. The film is directed by Vincent Moon, and was released simultaneously with the band's compilation The Virginia EP on May 20, 2008.

The film documents the recording process of the band's fourth studio album, Boxer (2007).

== Critical reception ==
In a positive review, Popmatters' J.M. Suarez noted: "It may even be misleading to call A Skin, A Night a documentary, as it rejects many of the standard techniques many would expect from such a project. In a similar way to AJ Schnack's Kurt Cobain: About a Son, Moon makes use of cityscapes, landscapes, and still images to paint a unique picture of a band at work, as well as offer a more complete picture of the band."
