= Video Game (song) =

Single by Sufjan Stevens

from the album The Ascension
- Released: August 13, 2020
- Genre: Synth-pop
- Length: 4:15
- Label: Asthmatic Kitty
- Songwriter: Sufjan Stevens
- Producer: Sufjan Stevens

Sufjan Stevens singles chronology
"America" (2020)	"Video Game" (2020)	"Sugar" (2020)

Music video
- "Video Game" on YouTube

"Video Game" is a song written, recorded, and produced by American singer-songwriter Sufjan Stevens for his eighth studio album, The Ascension (2020). It was released as the album's second single on August 13, 2020, through Stevens' Asthmatic Kitty label. It has been called a synth-pop song with lyrics that describe the effects of social media upon society. A music video for the track was released alongside the single.

== Track listings ==
Digital download/streaming
No.	Title	Length
1.	"Video Game"	4:15

Streaming – Spotify single edition
No.	Title	Length
1.	"Video Game"	4:16
2.	"America"	13:30

== Release history ==
Release dates and formats for "Video Game"
Region	Date	Format(s)	Label	Ref.
Various	August 13, 2020	Digital download; streaming	Asthmatic Kitty	
United States	August 13, 2020	Streaming (Spotify single edition)	Asthmatic Kitty	
