= 2×5 =

2008 composition by Steve Reich

2×5 is a composition by Steve Reich written in 2008. It is scored for five musicians and pre-recorded tape or two identical quintets on rock instruments, in total: 2 drum sets, 2 pianos, 4 electric guitars, 2 bass guitars. It is described as a "rock and roll piece". After writing the predominantly rhythmical Double Sextet, Reich was interested in writing a similar composition in a similar style for rock instruments.

== History ==
2x5, composed in 2008 in the wake of Double Sextet, is a piece commissioned for the Manchester International Festival. The debut performance of the piece was given by 5 musicians and magnetic tape. The piece was debuted by the musicians of Bang on a Can, Mark Stewart (Bang On a Can All Star guitarist and musical director), the guitarist Paul Simon, two musicians of The National, Aaron Dessner and Bryce Dessner, and Jonny Greenwood of Radiohead at the Manchester velodrome during the film festival during as the opener of a Kraftwerk concert.

== Structure ==
2x5 is a written work for an ensemble consisting of either 5 instruments and magnetic tape or 10 instrumentalists: 2 drumkits, 2 pianos, 4 electric guitars, and 2 bass guitars. This ensemble is based on the typical make-up of a rock band, and the work is often described as "energetic".

2×5 is in three movements and typically lasts around 20 minutes:

1. Fast
2. Slow
3. Fast

The similarity of the piece with rock music is clear, according to Steve Reich, specifically because of the instrumentation, but also because of the bass guitar line. The electric bass allowed Reich to achieve dry and less resonant sounds than ones produced by a contrabass. On the other hand, Reich's usage of the drumkit is different than what is typically seen in rock: within 2x5 the drumkit contains various colors and is interrupted several times.

== Recordings ==
A recording of 2×5 by Bang on a Can was released on September 14, 2010 along with Reich's Pulitzer Prize-winning Double Sextet on the album Double Sextet/2×5.

Another recording of 2×5, performed by Mats Bergström, Magnus Persson, Jonas Ostholm, Johan Liljedahl, and Svante Henryson, was released in 2012 by Mats Bergström Musik. The disc also features new recordings of Reich's Electric Counterpoint and Nagoya Guitars.

A Russian recording by Anton Glushkin, Dmitry Abdurasulov, Gleb Kolyadin, Max Roudenko, Grigory Osipov and Alexander Veselov was released in May 2020.
