= Mistaken for Strangers (song) =

Single by The National

from the album Boxer
- Released: April 30, 2007
- Recorded: Tarquin Studios
- Genre: Indie rock, post-punk revival
- Length: 3:31
- Label: Beggars Banquet Records
- Songwriter(s): Matt Berninger, Scott Devendorf
- Producer(s): Peter Katis and The National

The National singles chronology
"Lit Up" (2005)	"Mistaken for Strangers" (2007)	"Apartment Story" (2007)

"Mistaken for Strangers" is a song by Brooklyn-based indie rock band The National from their fourth studio album, Boxer. The song was released on April 30, 2007 in the UK and May 1, 2007 in the US as the album's first single.

== Reception ==
"Mistaken for Strangers" has received mostly positive reviews from music critics. Rob Sheffield of Rolling Stone and Louis Pattison of The Guardian each praised the song as one of Boxer's standout tracks, with Pattison adding that the song is "gloomily great." Heather Phares of Allmusic said the song "touches on the side of the band that could be mistaken for a more hopeful Joy Division, if lyrics like 'You wouldn't want an angel watching over you? / Surprise surprise, they wouldn't want to watch' can be counted as hopeful." Dennis Scanland of Music Emissions said it is "an infectingly beautiful upbeat song that is calling out to be the best track this year." Ian Cohen of Stylus Magazine described the song as "corrosive but ingratiating, backing up [vocalist Matt] Berninger's loopy melodies with little more than spiny, corrugated behind-the-bridge picking and brick-solid godbody drumming from Bryan Devendorf."

However, Ted Grant of Playlouder said the song, along with album track "Brainy," features "some especially overbearing stickwork and neo-sing-a-long choruses that don't really suit" the band.

The song was featured prominently in the film 2017 science fiction film Rememory. The song plays during the opening scene of the film in which the protagonist and a passenger, his brother, sing along to it while driving late at night on a highway in a wooded area. The song is interrupted by a fatal traffic collision, killing the protagonist's brother, establishing the plot's primary conflict. The film revisits the scene multiple times, as recalled by the protagonist.

The song's title was also given to the 2013 documentary film Mistaken for Strangers which premiered April 17, 2013 at the Tribeca Film Festival in New York City. The film takes place in 2010 as the band prepares to dive into the international spotlight. The National’s lead singer Matt Berninger invites his brother Tom to join the band on tour for the latter's directorial debut.

== Music video ==
The music video for "Mistaken for Strangers" was filmed in Berninger's Brooklyn apartment, and was released in May 2007. The video was directed by Thread-Count, a collaboration between Berninger's brother Tom, Ryer Banta, and Hope Hall.

In a June 2007 interview with The Scenestar, Matt Berninger explained the video as "very low-budget, without any narrative. No applied story to it. We're really happy with it. That kind of stuff, when it comes to videos, we'd much rather be cinéma vérité and just shooting the band as the band. Not the band on a desert or on a spaceship. That's usually more interesting I think."

== Track listing ==
UK CD (BBQ 405CD)

1. "Mistaken for Strangers" – 3:31
2. "Blank Slate" – 3:17
3. "Santa Clara" – 4:06

UK and US 7" vinyl (BBQ 405)

1. "Mistaken for Strangers" – 3:31
2. "Blank Slate" – 3:17

== Charts ==
Weekly chart performance for "Mistaken for Strangers"
Chart (2007)	Peak position
Scotland (OCC)	48
UK Singles (Official Charts Company)	183
UK Indie (OCC)	6

== Accolades ==
Publication	Country	Accolade	Year	Rank
Eye Weekly	Canada	Singles of the Year	2007	22
Pitchfork Media	U.S.	Tracks of the Year	2007	77
Rolling Stone	U.S.	Songs of the Year	2007	92
Slant Magazine	U.S.	Singles of the Year	2007	47
Hot Press	Ireland	Singles of the Year	2007	18
97X	U.S.	The 500 Best Modern Rock Songs of All Time	2009	398
Pitchfork Media	U.S.	The Top 500 Tracks of the 2000s	2009	337
