= Double Sextet/2×5 =

Studio album by Steve Reich

Double Sextet/2x5

Studio album by Steve Reich
- Released: September 14, 2010
- Genre: 20th-century classical
- Label: Nonesuch
- Producer: Judith Sherman

Steve Reich chronology
Daniel Variations	Double Sextet/2x5

Double Sextet/2×5 is an album by American minimalist composer Steve Reich. The album consists of two works composed by Reich, Double Sextet and 2×5. Double Sextet, which won the 2009 Pulitzer Prize for Music, is written for two identical sextets of flute, clarinet, vibraphone, piano, violin and cello. It has been recently quoted as being "among the finest pieces of our time" by The Philadelphia Inquirer. The piece lasts roughly 22 minutes.

2×5 is for two identical quintets consisting of two electric guitars, bass guitar, piano and drum set. It is described as a "rock and roll piece", lasting around 20 minutes.

== Tracks ==
Double Sextet

1. Fast
2. Slow
3. Fast

2×5

1. Fast
2. Slow
3. Fast
