= Clogs (band) =

Australian musical group

- Genres: Rock, instrumental
- Years active: Brassland
- Members: Padma Newsome; Bryce Dessner; Rachael Elliott; Thomas Kozumplik
- Website: clogsmusic.com

Clogs are a mostly instrumental project led by Bryce Dessner and Padma Newsome. Clogs have released five albums on Brassland Records—Thom's Night Out (2001), Lullaby for Sue (2003), Stick Music (2004), Lantern (2006) and The Creatures in the Garden of Lady Walton (2010).

== History ==
The band members, Bryce Dessner, Rachael Elliott, Thomas Kozumplik and Padma Newsome, met in the late 1990s while studying at the Yale School of Music. Newsome, born in 1961 in Alice Springs, Australia, started his career as a concert violinist in the Sydney Symphony, before a six-year detour took him to an ashram in the remote region of New South Wales. He began composing in the 1990s at the University of Adelaide, when he was awarded a Fulbright scholarship that brought him to America. Dessner is an established soloist and veteran of groups Bang on a Can All-Stars and the National, which has given him contact with Philip Glass and Terry Riley. Elliott released her debut album, Polka the Elk, in 2011, which displays her bassoon music and includes contributions from Newsome, David Lang and Tawnie Olson.

== Style ==
Clogs' "classical" music is the result of a peculiar writing process more akin to a rock band or a jazz quartet. The members come to rehearsals with basic ideas that the group riffs on and develops in jam sessions and live performance. Their influences include John Cage, Olivier Messiaen, and Philip Glass; and a 16th century lute player. Newsome later arranges these ideas into elegant and complex musical narratives that meld and extend the ideas of minimalist, modernist, and romantic composers, adding sounds and melodies drawn from the folk music of India, the Jewish diaspora, and everywhere else.

== Members ==
- Bryce Dessner – guitar, ukulele, prepared guitar, mandola
- Rachael Elliott – bassoon, melodica
- Thomas Kozumplik – percussion
- Padma Newsome – viola, violin, melodica, voice, piano, prepared guitar, mandola, celeste

== Discography ==
=== Albums ===
- Thom's Night Out (2001) – Brassland (HWY-002)
- Lullaby for Sue (2003)
- Stick Music (2004) – Brassland (HWY-007)
- Lantern (2006) – Brassland (HWY-010)
- The Creatures in the Garden of Lady Walton (2010) – Brassland (HWY-021)

=== Extended plays ===
- Veil Waltz (2010)
- Last Song (2010)
- The Sundown Song (2013)
