= Apartment Story =

Single by The National

from the album Boxer
- Released: November 5, 2007
- Recorded: Tarquin Studios
- Genre: Indie rock, post-punk revival
- Length: 3:34
- Label: Beggars Banquet Records
- Songwriter(s): Matt Berninger, Aaron Dessner
- Producer(s): Peter Katis and The National

The National singles chronology
"Mistaken for Strangers" (2007)	"Apartment Story" (2007)	"Fake Empire" (2008)

"Apartment Story" is a song by Brooklyn-based indie rock band The National from their fourth studio album, Boxer. The song was released on November 5, 2007 as the album's second single. The single's B-side is "Mansion on the Hill," originally recorded by Bruce Springsteen on his 1982 album Nebraska. The band's cover version was recorded live on January 14, 2006 at the opening night of that year's New York Guitar Festival.

The band performed "Apartment Story" at MTV's Times Square studio on May 19, 2007 as part of the channel's Human Giant 24-hour marathon special. The band also performed the song on The Late Late Show with Craig Ferguson on September 26, 2007.

In November 2007, Q featured "Apartment Story" in their list of 50 Essential Downloads. A month later, the song ranked #5 on Gigwise's "Top 50 Singles of 2007" list.

== Reception ==
"Apartment Story" received generally positive reviews by music critics. Rolling Stone writer Rob Sheffield said of the song, "[W]hen [Matt] Berninger murmurs, 'We'll stay inside till somebody finds us,' it's both romantic and terrifying, and the drums kick it all the way home." Jamie Harper of MusicOMH described the song as "moody but beautiful. Laced with melody, but understated." Tom Milway of Drowned in Sound said it "hits the listener with another distinctive and expertly performed drum line courtesy of Bryan Devendorf," and called the song "another radio-friendly slice of The National."

On the other hand, David Moore of Gigwise.com said that "after about ten plays it creates a personality for itself and you start to get it, but ten times is a lot." He added that the song "works much better inside the album than it does a stand alone track." However, Moore did note that as an introduction to the band, "it's a perfect place to start."

== Music video ==
The music video for "Apartment Story" was directed by Banner Gwin, and was released in September 2007. Filmed in the basement of a church a few blocks from Berninger's Brooklyn apartment, the video features the band's friends and family as extras. Berninger said the band "wanted to capture the sweet but awkward vibe of a wedding reception or singles mixer." He described the video as "something between John Hughes and Krzysztof Kieslowski."

The video is reminiscent of the Boxer cover photo, which depicts the band performing at producer Peter Katis's wedding. "Apartment Story" ranked #14 on Stereogum's "50 Best Videos of 2007" list.

== Track listing ==
UK 7" vinyl (BBQ 407)

1. "Apartment Story" – 3:44
2. "Mansion on the Hill" (Live) – 4:36

== Charts ==
Weekly chart performance for "Apartment Story"
Chart (2007)	Peak position
UK Indie (OCC)	45
