= Fake Empire =

Single by The National

from the album Boxer
- Released: June 23, 2008
- Recorded: Tarquin Studios
- Genre: Indie rock, post-punk revival
- Length: 3:27
- Label: Beggars Banquet Records
- Songwriters: Matt Berninger, Bryce Dessner
- Producers: Peter Katis and The National

The National singles chronology
"Apartment Story" (2007)	"Fake Empire" (2008)	"Bloodbuzz Ohio" (2010)

"Fake Empire" is a song by Brooklyn-based indie rock band The National from their fourth studio album, Boxer. The song was released in June 2008 as the album's third and final single.

== Production ==
"Fake Empire" was written by Bryce Dessner of The National. Commenting on the song's initial concept, he said, "Conceptually I said I would love to write a song that was based on a certain polyrhythm, the four-over-three pattern, which is what you hear in the piano. It's something I, personally, have never heard in rock music. What's interesting is the song sounds like it's in four, but it's in three. The harmonies and the way I'm playing the piano music are actually incredibly simple – sort of like "Chopsticks" simple – with this really weird rhythm. At the end we said, 'Oh, wouldn't it be cool if we had a horn fanfare?' so Padma [Newsome] wrote this very Steve Reichian minimalist horn fanfare."

== Lyrical Interpretation ==
Lyrically, "Fake Empire" is a commentary about a generation lost to disillusion and apathy. Vocalist Matt Berninger further explained to The Quietus that it is about "where you can't deal with the reality of what's really going on, so let's just pretend that the world's full of bluebirds and ice skating."

== Promotion ==
The National made their network television debut when they performed "Fake Empire" on the Late Show with David Letterman on July 24, 2007. In the television series Chuck, the song appeared in the episode "Chuck Versus the Break-up" on October 13, 2008. "Fake Empire" also played during the final scene of the pilot episode of NBC's police drama Southland, as well as over the concluding scene and credits of the 2008 film Battle in Seattle. An instrumental version of the song was featured in Barack Obama's campaign video "Signs of Hope and Change" during his 2008 United States presidential campaign, and the song was also played at the 2008 Democratic National Convention. The members of The National supported the presidential candidate; they put Obama's face on a fundraising T-shirt with the text "Mr. November", taken from the name of a song from the band's third album, Alligator. In the fifth season premiere episode of the teen drama television series One Tree Hill, several songs by The National were featured, including "Fake Empire". It was also featured in Person of Interest, at the end of the episode Sotto Voce, 9th episode of the 5th season. Season 1 episode 6 of Feel Good, a Netflix series, featured this song.

== Reception ==
Allmusic considered "Fake Empire" one of The National's best songs, and described it as a song that "begins as a dead-of-night ballad that echoes Leonard Cohen, then peppy brass and guitars turn it into something joyous." Mark Mordue of WAtoday called "Fake Empire" "one of the great rock'n'roll songs" of 2007. He described it as "a romantic-sounding tune marked by a quiet declaration that 'We're half awake in a fake empire,' [which] married the lonely-guy blues of a New York night to a veiled critique of American imperialism. In short, it expressed the feelings of being lost inside a dream." Stylus Magazine ranked "Fake Empire" as the 7th-best song of 2007.

== Track listing ==
DL and promo CD (BBQ 417)

1. "Fake Empire" – 3:27
2. "Without Permission" – 3:37
3. "Fake Empire" (Live) – 3:42

== Personnel ==
- Matt Berninger - vocals
- Aaron Dessner - guitar
- Bryce Dessner - guitar, piano
- Bryan Devendorf - drums, percussion
- Scott Devendorf - bass

Additional Musicians

- Tim Albright - trombone
- Thomas Bartlett - keyboards
- CJ Camerieri - trumpet
- Marla Hansen - backing vocals
- Jeb Wallace - French horn

== Certifications ==
Region	Certification	Certified units/sales
Canada (Music Canada)	Gold	40,000^{‡}
^{‡} Sales+streaming figures based on certification alone.

== Cover versions ==
- Danny Seim of Menomena recorded a cover of the song in 2008 for his solo project, Lackthereof, on the album Your Anchor.
- Ryan Lewis also released a song called "Fake Empire" on the album The VS. [Redux] in 2010 together with Macklemore. It samples the "Fake Empire" refrain, therefore making it a remix rather than a cover.
- Anna-Lynne Williams released a version of the song as Lotte Kestner on her 2011 album Stolen.
- Molly Tuttle, recorded a cover of the song on her …but I’d rather be with you album, released in 2020
