= Celebrate Brooklyn! =

Performing arts festival

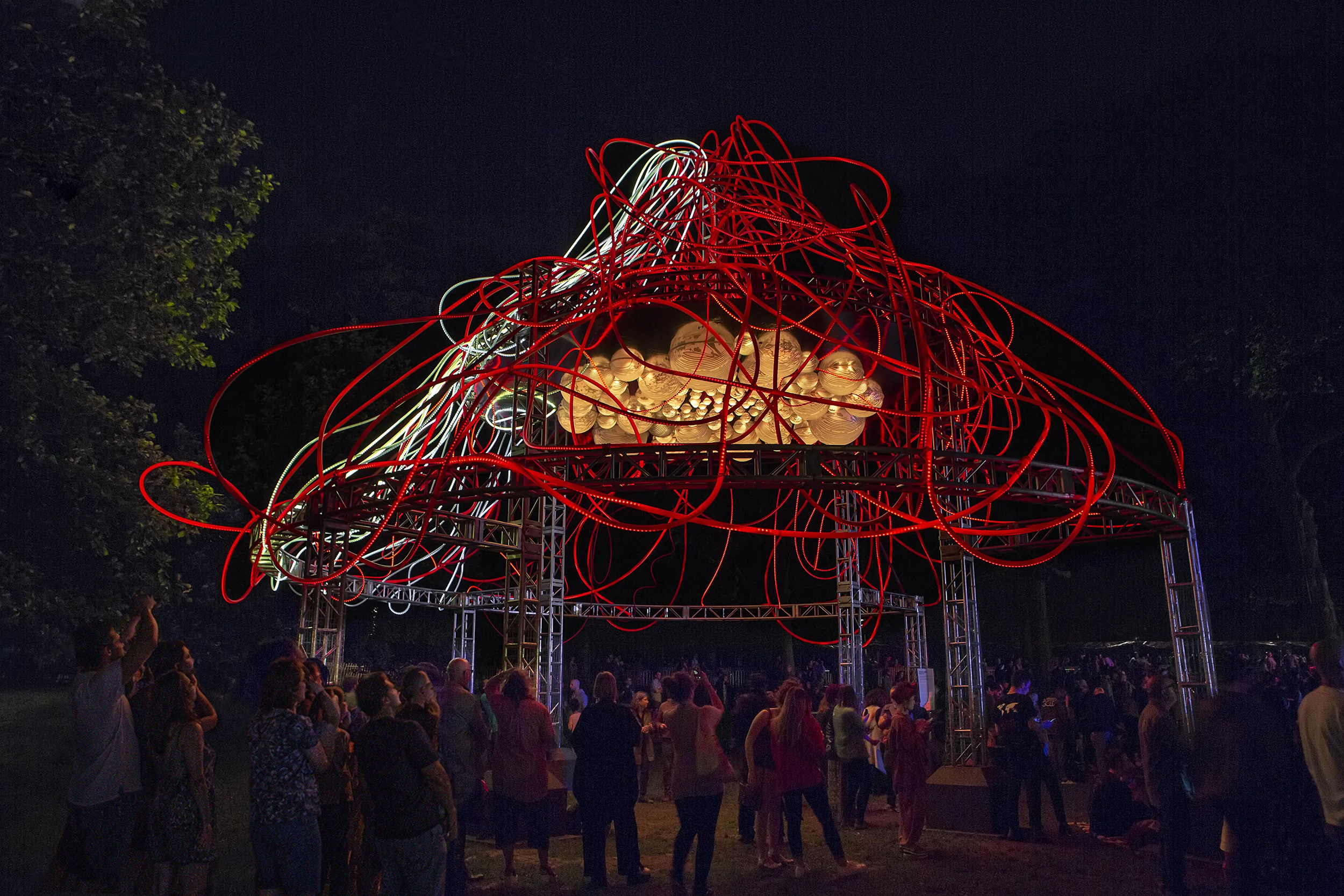
The 2018 Celebrate Brooklyn! festival, featuring light art by Grimanesa Amorós.

Celebrate Brooklyn!, sometimes called BRIC Celebrate Brooklyn!, is one of New York City’s longest-running, free, outdoor performing arts festivals. It was launched in 1979 by the then Fund for the Borough of Brooklyn and since the 2010s is produced by BRIC, an organization that presents contemporary art, performing arts, and media programs throughout Brooklyn. The festival is BRIC's flagship program.

What is now Celebrate Brooklyn! was established in 1979 by Nanette Rainone-founder of The Fund for the Borough of Brooklyn-and Burl Hash, the festival's first producer to bring people back to Prospect Park.

Saidah Blount became the festival's executive director in 2024.
