= America (Sufjan Stevens song) =

2020 single by Sufjan Stevens

Single by Sufjan Stevens

from the album The Ascension
- B-side: "My Rajneesh"
- Released: July 3, 2020
- Genre: Indie rock; ambient
- Length: 12:29
- Label: Asthmatic Kitty
- Songwriter: Sufjan Stevens
- Producer: Sufjan Stevens

Sufjan Stevens singles chronology
""Love Yourself"/"With My Whole Heart"" (2019)	"America" (2020)	"Video Game" (2020)

"America" is a song by American singer, songwriter, and multi-instrumentalist Sufjan Stevens. It was released as the lead single from the album The Ascension through Asthmatic Kitty on July 3, 2020.

== Background and composition ==
Stevens announced his upcoming eighth studio album, titled The Ascension, as well as its lead single, "America", on June 30, 2020. In his announcement, Stevens declared "America" as a "protest song against the sickness of American culture in particular". The song was first written in 2014 during the time that Stevens was working on his seventh studio album, Carrie & Lowell. It has also been described as a "twelve-minute rumination on disillusionment, suffering, and loss of faith in [Stevens's] nation".

== Critical reception ==
Awarding "America" four stars out of five, NME's El Hunt deemed it "weighty and substantial". Sam Sodomsky of Pitchfork gave it the publication's Best New Track designation and took note of the song's "characteristically sprawling arsenal—its symphonic slow-build, its sea of recorders, its climactic, singalong chorus". British GQ's Jonathan Dean praised the song's "intense and building lament that packs in claustrophobia and beauty" and its "end stretch twinkling ambiance". In her review of The Ascension for NPR, Lindsay Zoladz called "America" "the best and most barbed song [Stevens has] released in the past five years".

== Release history ==
Release dates and formats for "America"
Region	Date	Format(s)	Label	Ref.
Various	July 3, 2020	Digital download; streaming	Asthmatic Kitty	
Various	July 31, 2020	12-inch vinyl	Asthmatic Kitty	
