= She Came to Me (soundtrack) =

She Came to Me (Original Motion Picture Soundtrack)

Film score by Bryce Dessner
- Released: October 6, 2023
- Genre: Film score
- Length: 34:51
- Labels: Warner Classics; Unigram
- Producer: Bryce Dessner

Bryce Dessner chronology
A Good Person (2023)	She Came to Me (2023)

She Came to Me (Original Motion Picture Soundtrack) is the soundtrack to the 2023 film of the same name directed by Rebecca Miller. The original score is composed by Bryce Dessner, released through the Warner Classics label on October 6, 2023, alongside the film. The album featured 20 tracks from Dessner's original score and Bruce Springsteen's original song "Addicted to Romance".

== Background ==
Dessner opined that the music of the score, mostly derived from Steven's character which resembles his normal music pieces and being fit into various styles. As a part of the central narrative, Dessner wrote music for the two operas, and opted for a piano-driven score due to its emotional quality with comedic beats. Dessner's piano compositions were "very fast and high-paced" and not sort of typical film music that can be played by average pianists, and such compositions were performed by concert pianists. For that, he roped in French concert pianist Katia Labèque, where "she brought a lot of humanity and emotion to the skeletal piano line".

During the final edit, Rebecca Miller felt that the film missed a compelling song for which Dessner replied "Bruce Springsteen would be perfect". As Miller used Springsteen's "Dancing in the Dark" in Maggie's Plan (2015), she felt the idea of him writing an end credits song would work well for the film, although several insiders convinced her not to approach him, Dessner who was optimistic about Springsteen's inclusion, said that "Bruce loved the idea. He loved the film. There's a line in the first opera and in the script: I'm addicted to romance' which is also a throughline in the movie, and he wrote the song, 'Addicted to Romance' with his wife, Patti Scialfa". The song was a duet ballad with harmonies and pianos, which was produced by Dessner himself, was written during early February 2023.

== Release ==
On September 1, 2023, Dessner announced that the soundtrack would be released through the Warner Classics label on September 29, 2023. A single from the score, "Patricia at the Convent" released on September 14, while Springsteen's song "Addicted to Romance" released on September 29. The album was however released on October 6, the film's original release date and made available in digital and physical formats.

== Track listing ==
No.	Title	Length
1.	"Hero"	2:04
2.	"Patricia's Rendezvous"	1:23
3.	"Alien Opera (Hurry, Hurry)"	4:18
4.	"Tugboat Opera (She Came to Me)"	2:42
5.	"Patricia at the Convent"	1:55
6.	"Trey's Plans"	2:05
7.	"Julian and Tereza"	1:05
8.	"I Love Cleaning"	0:45
9.	"Falling (Night on the Tug)"	1:18
10.	"Breakthrough"	1:11
11.	"Falling (Tension)"	1:02
12.	"Grew Up on This Tug"	1:36
13.	"Stoking the Fire"	1:45
14.	"Trey's Demands"	1:02
15.	"Rising Strings (We Just Have To Keep Reminding Each Other)"	1:00
16.	"Get Lost Steven"	2:04
17.	"Panic Mirror"	1:04
18.	"Escape"	1:12
19.	"I Love Cleaning" (Solo Piano)	1:42
20.	"Falling" (Pizzicato)	0:33
21.	"Addicted to Romance" (Bruce Springsteen)	3:05
Total length:		34:51

== Reception ==
David Rooney of The Hollywood Reporter described it as "tinkly". Wendy Ide of Screen International described it as "lovely" and "fluid".
