= Mina Tindle =

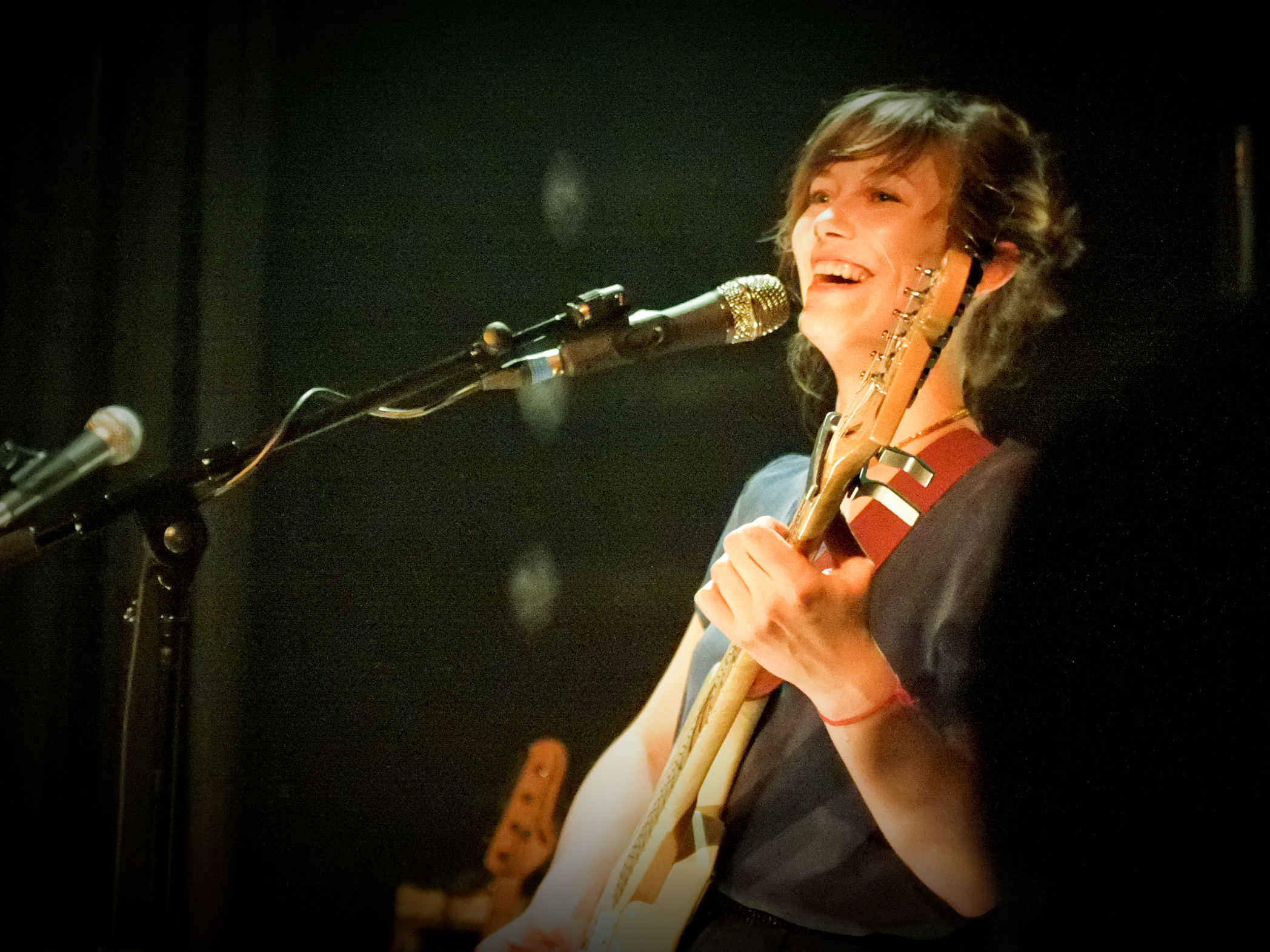
- Mina Tindle in 2012

Background information
- Born: Pauline de Lassus Saint-Geniès; 9 April 1983 (age 43); Paris, France
- Origin: Paris, France
- Genres: Pop, folk, soul
- Occupations: Singer, songwriter, multi-instrumentalist
- Instruments: Guitar, piano, synth
- Years active: 2008-present
- Labels: Believe Recordings, Sauvage, S76
- Spouse: Bryce Dessner
- Website: www.minatindle.com

Pauline de Lassus Saint-Geniès (born 9 April 1983), better known by her stage name Mina Tindle, is a French folk and new wave singer, songwriter and multi-instrumentalist. She released her debut EP with Sauvage Records, and in March 2012 released her debut album Taranta on Believe Recordings.

De Lassus was born in Paris and has family that reside in Spain. Among her ancestors is French composer Charles Gounod. She lived in Brooklyn where she played with the band The Limes before returning to Paris to pursue her career as a solo artist. She is married to The National member Bryce Dessner and has provided vocals on several of their albums since 2007. Dessner co-produced her second album, Parades, in 2014

== Discography ==
=== Albums ===
Year	Album	Peak position
Year	Album	FRA
2012	Taranta	128
2014	Parades	156
2020	Sister	
2025	Compass Rosa	

=== Singles ===
Year	Single	Peak position	Album
Year	Single	FRA	Album
2012	"To Carry Many Small Things"	128	Taranta
2013	"Henry"	132	Taranta
2014	"I Command"	—	Parades
