= Patrick Stolley =

American singer-songwriter

- Born: July 31, 1970 (age 56); Davenport, Iowa
- Genres: Indie rock, alternative rock
- Occupations: Recording engineer, musician
- Instruments: Vocals, guitar, bass guitar, piano, synthesizer
- Years active: 1990 – present
- Label: Future Appletree Records
- Website: fs2.futureappletree.com

Patrick Stolley (born July 31, 1970) is an American audio engineer, singer, songwriter, and producer. He is a founding member of Daytrotter, and Future Appletree Records, and a performer with musical acts The Multiple Cat, The Marlboro Chorus, and Struggle in the Hive. He is best known for engineering Daytrotter recording sessions with musicians such as Andrew Bird, Ra Ra Riot, Of Montreal, and Ani DiFranco. He currently owns and operates Future Appletree Studio Too recording studio in Rock Island, Illinois.

== Recording work ==
Stolley produced his first significant body of work for Quad Cities record label Future Appletree Records. The label focuses on Quad Cities-based and regional acts such as Driver of the Year, Chrash, The Marlboro Chorus, and Tenki. Many of the releases from this period are still in print, and many of the bands are still active.

Stolley estimates that during his two years as principal recordist for Daytrotter.com, he engineered over 350 bands, and about 1500 songs, mostly by relatively obscure acts. More prominent artists that Stolley recorded include Vampire Weekend, The Magic Numbers, David Bazan, Low, The National, Dirty Projectors, Spoon, Bon Iver, Fleet Foxes, ...And You Will Know Us by the Trail of Dead, The presidents of the United States of America, Okkervil River, Delta Spirit, Voxtrot, Andrew Bird, Ra Ra Riot, Of Montreal, and Ani DiFranco. Virtually all of Stolley's Daytrotter recordings are available as free downloads from Daytrotter.com.

Stolley is notable for his use of analog recording techniques, including extensive use of multitrack tape recorders.
