= Mistaken for Strangers (film) =

- Film poster
- Directed by: Tom Berninger
- Produced by: Matt Berninger; Carin Besser; Craig Charland
- Starring: The National
- Cinematography: Tom Berninger
- Edited by: Tom Berninger; Carin Besser
- Music by: The National
- Distributed by: Abramorama
- Release dates: April 17, 2013 (Tribeca); March 28, 2014
- Running time: 75 minutes
- Country: United States
- Language: English

Mistaken for Strangers is a 2013 documentary film featuring the American indie rock band The National. The film is directed by Tom Berninger, brother of lead singer Matt Berninger, and premiered April 17, 2013 at the Tribeca Film Festival in New York City.

== Synopsis ==
When the National goes on tour in 2010, singer Matt Berninger invites his younger brother Tom to tour with them as part of the crew. Tom aspires to be a filmmaker and documents the National being on tour, as well as the process of himself making a film about his successful older brother.

== Critical reception ==
On review aggregator Rotten Tomatoes, the film holds an approval rating of 92% based on 61 reviews, with an average rating of 7.53/10. The website's critics consensus reads: "A suitably complicated look at fraternal bonds, Mistaken for Strangers offers more depth and insight than the usual tour documentary." On Metacritic, the film has a weighted average score of 72 out of 100, based on 19 critics, indicating "generally favorable reviews".

Jillian Mapes in her review for Pitchfork Media wrote "what may be the funniest, most meta music movie since Spinal Tap". Ann Hornaday in her review for The Washington Post described it as "a funny, eccentric and finally deeply poignant depiction of art, family, self-sabotage and the prickly intricacies of brotherly love."
