= Eighth Blackbird =

American contemporary classical music sextet

- Genres: New music / contemporary classical
- Years active: 1996–present
- Label: Cedille Records
- Members: Lina Andonovska; Aaron Wolff; Maiani da Silva; Matthew Duvall; Zachary Good; Lisa Kaplan
- Past members: Ashley Bathgate; Molly Barth; Matt Albert; Nathalie Joachim; Yvonne Lam; Nicholas Photinos; Tim Munro
- Website: http://www.eighthblackbird.org

Eighth Blackbird (stylized as eighth blackbird until April 2016) is an American contemporary music sextet based in Chicago, composed of flute, clarinet, piano, percussion, violin, and cello (Pierrot ensemble with percussion). Their name derives from the eighth stanza of Wallace Stevens' poem Thirteen Ways of Looking at a Blackbird.

== History ==
Eighth Blackbird was originally formed at the Oberlin Conservatory of Music, while the members were participating in the school's Contemporary Music Ensemble conducted by Tim Weiss. Weiss is consistently credited by ensemble members as helping to form the ensemble and with encouraging them to memorize and choreograph their shows. In 1996, the ensemble won the Fischoff National Chamber Music Competition, a prestigious award given every year to the United States' best chamber ensembles. Two years later, while the members were studying together at the University of Cincinnati College-Conservatory of Music, success at the Concert Artists Guild competition led to the ensemble's first management contract. Since then, the ensemble has gone on to win many prizes and has routinely been hailed by leading critics as forging a pathway for classical music in the twenty-first century.

The members of Eighth Blackbird hold degrees in music performance from the United States' leading music schools, including Oberlin Conservatory, the University of Cincinnati College-Conservatory of Music, the Juilliard School, Northwestern University, and the Curtis Institute of Music. Current players in the group include Maiani da Silva, violin; Ashley Bathgate, cello; Lina Andonovska, flute; Zachary Good, clarinet; Lisa Kaplan, piano; and Matthew Duvall, percussion. Eighth Blackbird continues today under the leadership of founding members Lisa Kaplan (executive director) and Matthew Duvall (artistic director).

== Collaborations ==
From 2012 to 2015, the group served as ensemble-in-residence at the prestigious Curtis Institute of Music in Philadelphia. Additionally, the group has led short-term residencies at the UMKC Conservatory of Music and Dance (where it was the Barr Institute Ensemble Laureate), Colburn School, University of Michigan, Oberlin College, Southern Methodist University, Rice University, and the Interlochen Arts Academy. In 2015 the group engaged as Artist-in-Residence at the Museum of Contemporary Art Chicago, rehearsing and conducting daily business on the third floor galleries.

The ensemble's extensive recording history, primarily with Chicago's Cedille Records, encompasses more than a dozen acclaimed albums. Four of these recordings have won Grammy awards: 2006's strange imaginary animals won two 2008 Grammy Awards, including the award for Best Chamber Music Performance. Lonely Motel: Music from Slide won in 2009 and features excerpts from the music and theater work Slide, a collaboration between Eighth Blackbird, composer Steve Mackey, and singer, actor, and librettist Rinde Eckert. Meanwhile, an album featuring Stephen Hartke's piece of the same name, won a Grammy in 2011. FILAMENT won the 2015 Best Chamber Music/Small Ensemble Performance.

Since its founding in 1996, Eighth Blackbird has been active in commissioning new works from composers such as Steve Reich, David Lang, George Perle, Frederic Rzewski, Joseph Schwantner, Paul Moravec, and Stephen Hartke, as well as works from Jennifer Higdon, Derek Bermel, Nico Muhly, Bryce Dessner, David Little, Daniel Kellogg, Carlos Sanchez-Gutierrez, and the Minimum Security Composers Collective. The group received the first BMI/Boudleaux-Bryant Fund Commission and the 2007 American Music Center Trailblazer Award and has received grants from BMI, Meet the Composer, the Greenwall Foundation, and Chamber Music America.

In June 2009, Eighth Blackbird served as music director of the Ojai Music Festival in Southern California. In February 2011, Eighth Blackbird curated the Tune-In Music Festival at the Park Avenue Armory in New York City. The group devised a program which centered around Igor Stravinsky's controversial statement that music was, "essentially powerless to express anything at all," and culminated in the indoor premier of John Luther Adams' monumental percussion work Inuksuit. In 2012, the group also developed the Metropolis New Music Festival in Melbourne, Australia, which featured Steve Reich as its composer-in-residence. Demonstrating its flair for combining musical and theatrical elements in its performances, Eighth Blackbird has also created an original cabaret-opera style staging of Arnold Schoenberg's seminal work Pierrot Lunaire, which the group performs entirely from memory and a fully staged, evening-length work by Amy Beth Kirsten entitled Colombine’s Paradise Theatre.

== Recordings ==
''Round Nut Tool''

- Released: 1999
- Format: CD
- Label: Eighth Blackbird

''Thirteen Ways''

- Released: 2003
- Format: CD
- Label: Cedille Records

''Beginnings''

- Released: 2004
- Format: CD
- Label: Cedille Records

''fred''

- Released: 2005
- Format: CD
- Label: Cedille Records
- Singles: "Coming Together"

''strange imaginary animals''

- Released: 2006
- Format: CD
- Label: Cedille Records

''Double Sextet • 2x5''

- Released: 2010
- Format: CD
- Label: Nonesuch

''On a Wire''

- Released: 2011
- Format: CD
- Label: ASO Media

''Lonely Motel''

- Released: 2011
- Format: CD
- Label: Cedille Records

''Meanwhile''

- Released: 2012
- Format: CD
- Label: Cedille Records

''Filament''

- Released: 2015
- Format: CD
- Label: Cedille Records

''Hand Eye'' (collaboration with the "Sleeping Giant" composer collective)

- Released: 2016
- Format: CD
- Label: Cedille Records

''Olagón: A Cantata in Doublespeak'' (collaboration with vocalist Iarla Ó Lionáird of the Irish supergroup The Gloaming, Princeton-based composer-fiddler Dan Trueman, and Pulitzer Prize-winning Irish poet Paul Muldoon)

- Released: 2017
- Format: CD
- Label: Cedille Records

''Singing in the Dead of Night''

- Released: 2020
- Format: CD
- Label: Cedille Records
