= Bruce Springsteen =

American musician and songwriter (born 1949)

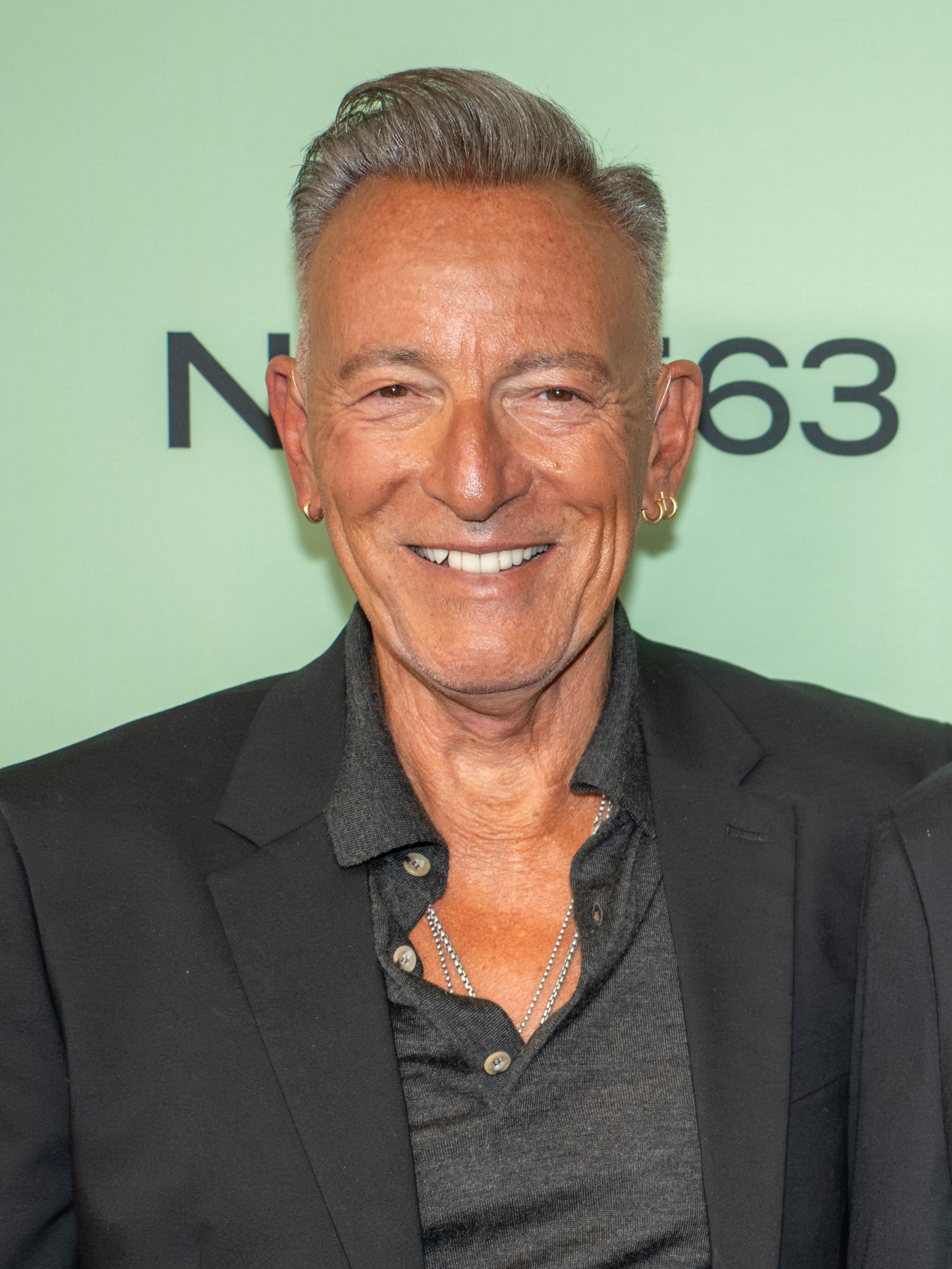
- Springsteen in 2025
- Born: September 23, 1949 (age 77); Long Branch, New Jersey, U.S.
- Occupations: Singer; songwriter; musician
- Spouses: Julianne Phillips (m. 1985; div. 1989) Patti Scialfa (m. 1991)
- Children: 3, including Jessica
- Relatives: Pamela Springsteen (sister)
- Awards: Full list
- Musical career
- Origin: Freehold, New Jersey, U.S.
- Genres: Rock; heartland rock; folk rock; pop rock
- Instruments: Vocals; guitar; harmonica
- Works: Discography; songs
- Years active: 1964–present
- Label: Columbia
- Member of: E Street Band
- Formerly of: The Rogues; The Castiles; Earth; Steel Mill
- Website: brucespringsteen.net

Bruce Frederick Joseph Springsteen (born September 23, 1949) is an American singer, songwriter, and musician. Nicknamed "the Boss", Springsteen has released 21 studio albums spanning six decades; most feature the E Street Band, his backing band since 1972.

Springsteen released his first two albums, Greetings from Asbury Park, N.J. and The Wild, the Innocent & the E Street Shuffle, in 1973, and achieved worldwide popularity with Born to Run (1975). He followed with Darkness on the Edge of Town (1978) and The River (1980), featuring "Hungry Heart". After releasing the solo acoustic album Nebraska (1982), he recorded Born in the U.S.A. (1984) with the E Street Band. It is his most successful album and one of the best-selling of all time. Springsteen mostly hired session musicians for his next three albums, Tunnel of Love (1987), Human Touch (1992), and Lucky Town (1992). He reassembled the E Street Band for Greatest Hits (1995), and recorded the acoustic album The Ghost of Tom Joad (1995) and the EP Blood Brothers (1996) solo.

Following the Bruce Springsteen and the E Street Band Reunion Tour in 1999 and 2000, Springsteen released The Rising (2002), dedicated to the victims of the September 11 attacks. This was followed by two folk albums, Devils & Dust (2005) and We Shall Overcome: The Seeger Sessions (2006), his first cover album. Springsteen followed with Magic (2007), Working on a Dream (2009), Wrecking Ball (2012), and High Hopes (2014). In 2017, 2018, and 2021, Springsteen performed Springsteen on Broadway, performing songs and telling stories from his 2016 autobiography. He released the solo album Western Stars in 2019, Letter to You with the E Street Band in 2020, and a solo cover album, Only the Strong Survive, in 2022. With Letter to You, Springsteen became the first artist to release a top-five album in six consecutive decades. He released the politically charged "Streets of Minneapolis" in 2026, which reached number one on the iTunes Top Songs chart.

A prominent musician from the album era, Springsteen has sold more than 140 million records worldwide, making him one of the best-selling music artists of all time. His accolades include 20 Grammy Awards, two Golden Globes, an Academy Award, and a Special Tony Award. He was inducted into the Songwriters Hall of Fame and the Rock and Roll Hall of Fame in 1999, received the Kennedy Center Honors in 2009, was named MusiCares person of the year in 2013, and was awarded the Presidential Medal of Freedom in 2016 and the National Medal of Arts in 2023. In 2010, Rolling Stone ranked Springsteen 23rd on its list of the "100 Greatest Artists of All Time", describing him as "the embodiment of rock and roll". In 2025, Springsteen became one of only five artists to gross over $2.3 billion in touring thanks to his 2023–2025 Tour with the E Street Band.

== Early life and education ==
Bruce Frederick Joseph Springsteen was born at Monmouth Medical Center in Long Branch, New Jersey on September 23, 1949. His parents were Adele Ann Springsteen (née Zerilli; 1925–2024) and Douglas Frederick "Dutch" Springsteen (1924–1998). Adele, who was originally from the Bay Ridge neighborhood of Brooklyn, New York, worked as a legal secretary and was the family's main breadwinner. Douglas was a World War II veteran who worked as a bus driver; he had mental health issues throughout his life, and they worsened in his later life. Springsteen is of Dutch, Irish, and Italian descent. He grew up Catholic in Freehold, New Jersey.

Springsteen's Italian maternal grandfather, Anthony Zerilli, was born in Vico Equense and immigrated to the U.S. through Ellis Island. He arrived in the United States unable to read or write English, but went on to become a lawyer and impressed the young Springsteen as being "larger than life".

Springsteen's paternal ancestors were Dutch and Irish. His Dutch ancestors were among the early Dutch families who came to North America in the 17th century. Springsteen's paternal ancestor, John Springsteen, was a patriot in the American Revolution, which evolved into the Continental Army during the American Revolutionary War. The Springsteen surname originates in Groningen, a province in the Netherlands. The name is topographic; it is translated as "jump stone" and refers to a stepping stone used on unpaved streets or between two houses. His Irish roots are traced to the Garrity family of Rathangan, County Kildare and the McNicholas family of Treenagleragh in Kiltimagh, County Mayo.

Springsteen has two younger sisters, Virginia (born 1951) and Pamela (born c. 1962). Pamela Springsteen worked briefly as an actress and later as a photographer; she took photos for three of Springsteen's albums (Human Touch, Lucky Town, and The Ghost of Tom Joad).

Springsteen attended the St. Rose of Lima Catholic School in Freehold. He was at odds with the nuns and rebelled against the strictures imposed upon him; nevertheless, some of his music reflects a Catholic ethos and includes Irish Catholic hymns with a rock twist. In 2012, Springsteen said that it was his Catholic upbringing rather than his political ideology that most influenced his music. He said his faith gave him a "very active spiritual life" but joked that this "made it very difficult sexually". He added, "Once a Catholic, always a Catholic". He recalls reading The Wonderful Wizard of Oz "one lazy summer on my front porch on Randolph Street in New Jersey. I remember being thrilled by the book and the act of reading."

Springsteen grew up hearing fellow New Jersey singer Frank Sinatra on the radio. By the age of seven, he became interested in being a musician after seeing Elvis Presley's performances on The Ed Sullivan Show in 1956 and 1957. Soon thereafter, his mother rented him a guitar from Mike Diehl's Music in Freehold for $6 a week. He took a few weeks of guitar lessons, but quit after they failed to provide him with the instant gratification he desired. He recalls hearing "Hound Dog": "It just shot straight through to my brain. And suddenly I realized there was more to life than what I'd been living."

In ninth grade, Springsteen entered Freehold High School. He did not fit in there, either. A former teacher said Springsteen was a "loner who wanted nothing more than to play his guitar". He graduated in 1967, but felt so alienated that he skipped his graduation ceremony. He briefly attended Ocean County College, but dropped out.

At age 19, Springsteen was called for his draft physical, but failed it because of a concussion he had suffered in a motorcycle accident two years earlier; the concussion, combined with his behavior at induction, reportedly made him unacceptable for military service. In failing his examination, Springsteen likely avoided service in the Vietnam War.

In 1969, Springsteen's parents and Pamela moved to San Mateo, California; he and Virginia, who was married and pregnant at the time, remained in Freehold.

== Career ==
=== 1964–1971: Early career ===
This was different, shifted the lay of the land. Four guys, playing and singing, writing their own material. [...] Rock 'n' roll came to my house where there seemed to be no way out [...] and opened up a whole world of possibilities.

— Springsteen on the impact of the Beatles

In 1964, Springsteen saw the Beatles' performances on The Ed Sullivan Show. Inspired, he bought his first guitar for $18.95 at the Western Auto appliance store. Thereafter, he started playing for audiences with a band called the Rogues at local venues, including Elks Lodge in Freehold. Later that year, his mother took out a loan to buy him a $60 Kent guitar, an act he later memorialized in his song "The Wish". In 1965, he went to the house of Tex and Marion Vinyard, who sponsored young bands in town. They helped him become the lead guitarist and subsequently one of the lead singers of the Castiles, a band that recorded two original songs at a public recording studio in Brick Township and played a variety of venues, including Cafe Wha? in Greenwich Village. Marion Vinyard said she believed the young Springsteen when he promised he would make it big. In the late 1960s, Springsteen performed briefly in a power trio known as Earth, which played in various clubs in New Jersey and at a major show at the Hotel Diplomat in New York City. After being kicked out of his first band, he learned the guitar solo of the Rolling Stones cover of Bobby Womack's "It's All Over Now". A formative song was Bob Dylan's "Like a Rolling Stone". He recalled the opening snare shot: "like someone kicked open the door to your mind."

From 1969 through early 1971, Springsteen performed with the band Child, which later changed its name to Steel Mill and included Danny Federici, Vini Lopez, Vinnie Roslin, and later Steven Van Zandt and Robbin Thompson. Steel Mill performed at various Jersey Shore venues and also outside of New Jersey, in Richmond, Virginia; Nashville, Tennessee; and California, and gathered a cult following. In his January 1970 review of Steel Mill's show at The Matrix, music critic Philip Elwood wrote in the San Francisco Examiner that he had "never been so overwhelmed by a totally unknown talent" and called Steel Mill "the first big thing that's happened to Asbury Park since the good ship Morro Castle burned to the waterline of that Jersey beach in '34". Elwood praised the band's "cohesive musicality" and called Springsteen "a most impressive composer". In San Mateo, Steel Mill recorded three original Springsteen songs at Pacific Recording.

=== 1971–1974: Greetings from Asbury Park, N.J. ===
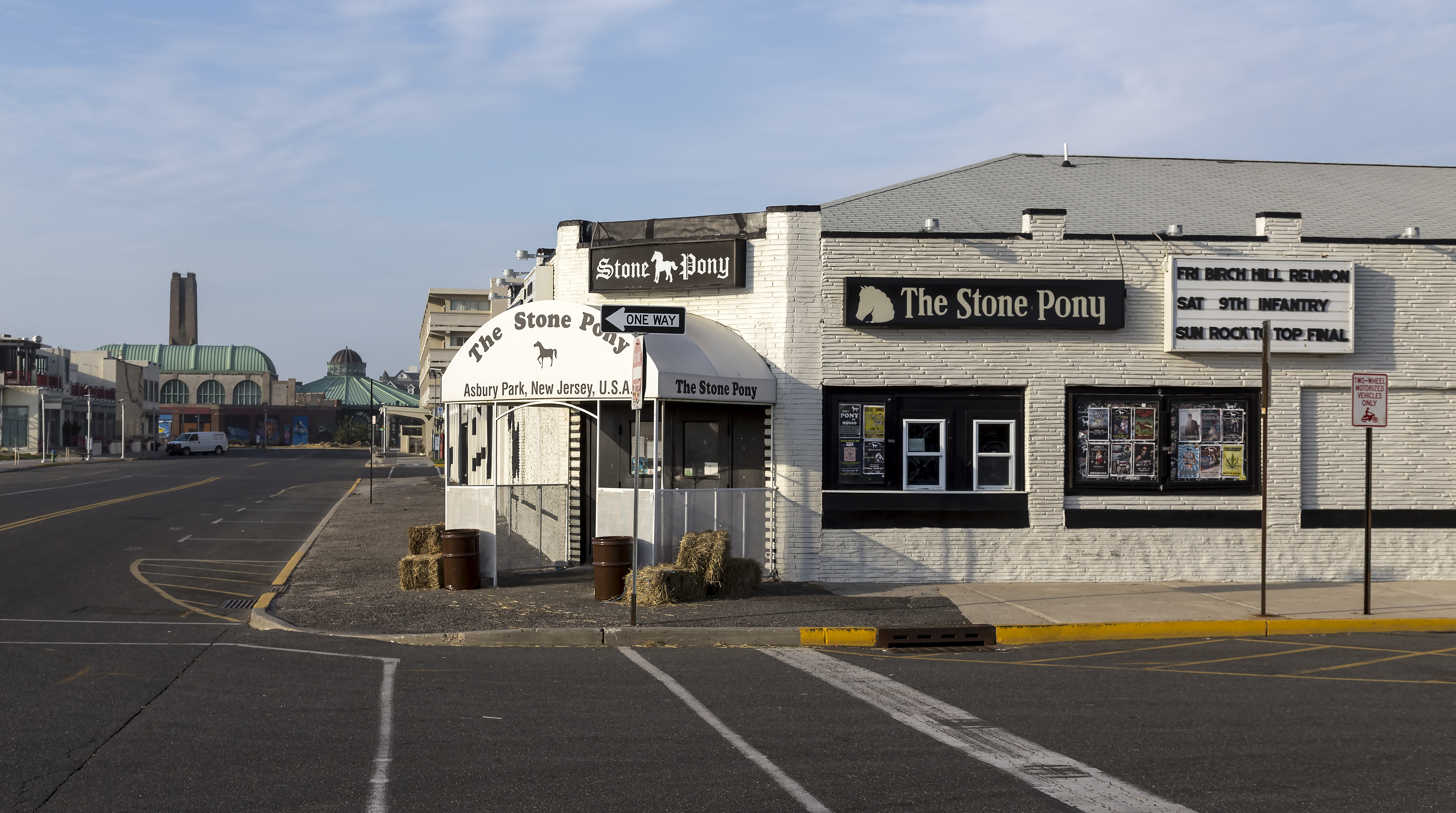
The Stone Pony, a live music club and bar in Asbury Park, New Jersey, where Springsteen and other E Street Band members played regularly in the 1970s. In the early 1980s, Springsteen met his future wife, Patti Scialfa, at the Stone Pony.

As Springsteen sought to shape a unique and genuine musical and lyrical style, he performed with the bands Dr. Zoom & the Sonic Boom from early-to-mid-1971, the Sundance Blues Band in mid-1971, and the Bruce Springsteen Band from mid-1971 to mid-1972. His style included, as his future record label described it in early publicity campaigns, "more words in some individual songs than other artists had in whole albums". He brought his skills to the attention of several people who went on to prove influential to his career development, including managers Mike Appel and Jim Cretecos, who in turn brought him to the attention of John Henry Hammond, a talent scout at Columbia Records who had signed Bob Dylan. In May 1972, Springsteen auditioned for Hammond.

In October 1972, Springsteen formed a new band for the recording of his debut album. The band eventually became known as the E Street Band, although the name was not used until September 1974. Springsteen acquired the nickname "the Boss" during this period, since he took on the task of collecting his band's nightly pay and distributing it among his bandmates. The nickname also reportedly sprang from games of Monopoly, which Springsteen played with other Jersey Shore musicians.

Springsteen was signed to Columbia Records in 1972. His debut album, Greetings from Asbury Park, N.J. (1973) established him as a critical favorite. Because of Springsteen's lyrical poeticism and folk rock-rooted music exemplified on tracks like "Blinded by the Light" and "For You", and his connection with Hammond and Columbia Records, critics initially compared Springsteen to Dylan. "He sings with a freshness and urgency I haven't heard since I was rocked by 'Like a Rolling Stone'", Crawdaddy editor Peter Knobler wrote in a March 1973 profile of Springsteen's that included photographs taken by Ed Gallucci. Crawdaddy was an early champion of Springsteen; Knobler profiled him in the magazine three times, in 1973, 1975, and 1978. In June 1976, Springsteen and the E Street Band acknowledged the magazine's support by giving a private performance at the magazine's 10th Anniversary Party in New York City.

Springsteen's second album, The Wild, the Innocent & the E Street Shuffle, was released in November, eleven months after Greetings from Asbury Park. Like Springsteen's debut, The Wild, the Innocent & the E Street Shuffle was met with critical acclaim but limited commercial success. Springsteen's songs became grander in form and scope with the E Street Band providing a less folksy, more rhythm and blues vibe, and lyrics that romanticized teenage street life. "4th of July, Asbury Park (Sandy)" and "Incident on 57th Street" became fan favorites, while "Rosalita (Come Out Tonight)" continues to rank among Springsteen's most beloved concert numbers; as of June 2020, he had played it live 809 times.

In February 1974, the Stone Pony, a music venue and bar, opened on Ocean Avenue in Asbury Park, and Springsteen played there regularly. In the early 1980s, Springsteen also met his future wife, Patti Scialfa, at the Stone Pony during her performance there. A regular venue for Springsteen, Jon Bon Jovi, Southside Johnny, and other acts from the area, the Stone Pony has since been described as "an integral part of music history for decades."

After seeing Springsteen's performance at the Harvard Square Theater in 1974, music critic Jon Landau wrote that he "saw rock and roll future, and its name is Bruce Springsteen." Springsteen met Landau in Boston a month prior and the two became close friends; Landau became the co-producer of Springsteen's next album, Born to Run (1975). As Springsteen's last-ditch effort at a commercially viable record, Springsteen became bogged down in the recording process while striving for a "Wall of Sound" production. When his manager, Mike Appel, orchestrated the release of an early mix of "Born to Run" to nearly a dozen radio stations, anticipation built toward the album's release.

The album took over 14 months to record, with six months spent recording "Born to Run" alone. E Street Band members David Sancious and Ernest Carter departed after "Born to Run" was completed, and were replaced by Roy Bittan and Max Weinberg on piano and drums, respectively. Springsteen battled with anger and frustration throughout the sessions, saying he heard "sounds in [his] head" that he could not explain to the others in the studio. He also dealt with two producers who had opposing views. During the recording of "Tenth Avenue Freeze-Out", Steven Van Zandt conceived the horn parts for the horn players on the spot in the studio after Springsteen and Bittan had failed to write proper ones by the time the players arrived to record. He joined the E Street Band shortly thereafter. Mixing for Born to Run lasted until July 20, 1975, just before a concert tour began.

Born to Run was mastered while the band was on the road. Springsteen was furious at the initial acetate, throwing it into the swimming pool of the hotel he was staying at. He contemplated scrapping the entire project and re-recording it live before he was stopped from doing so by Landau. Springsteen was sent multiple mixes while he was on the road and rejected each of them until August, when he approved the final mix. He reflected, "In ’75, when I went into the studio to make Born to Run, I wanted to make a record with words like Bob Dylan that sounded like Phil Spector, but most of all I wanted to sing like Roy Orbison."

=== 1975–1983: Born to Run and breakthrough ===
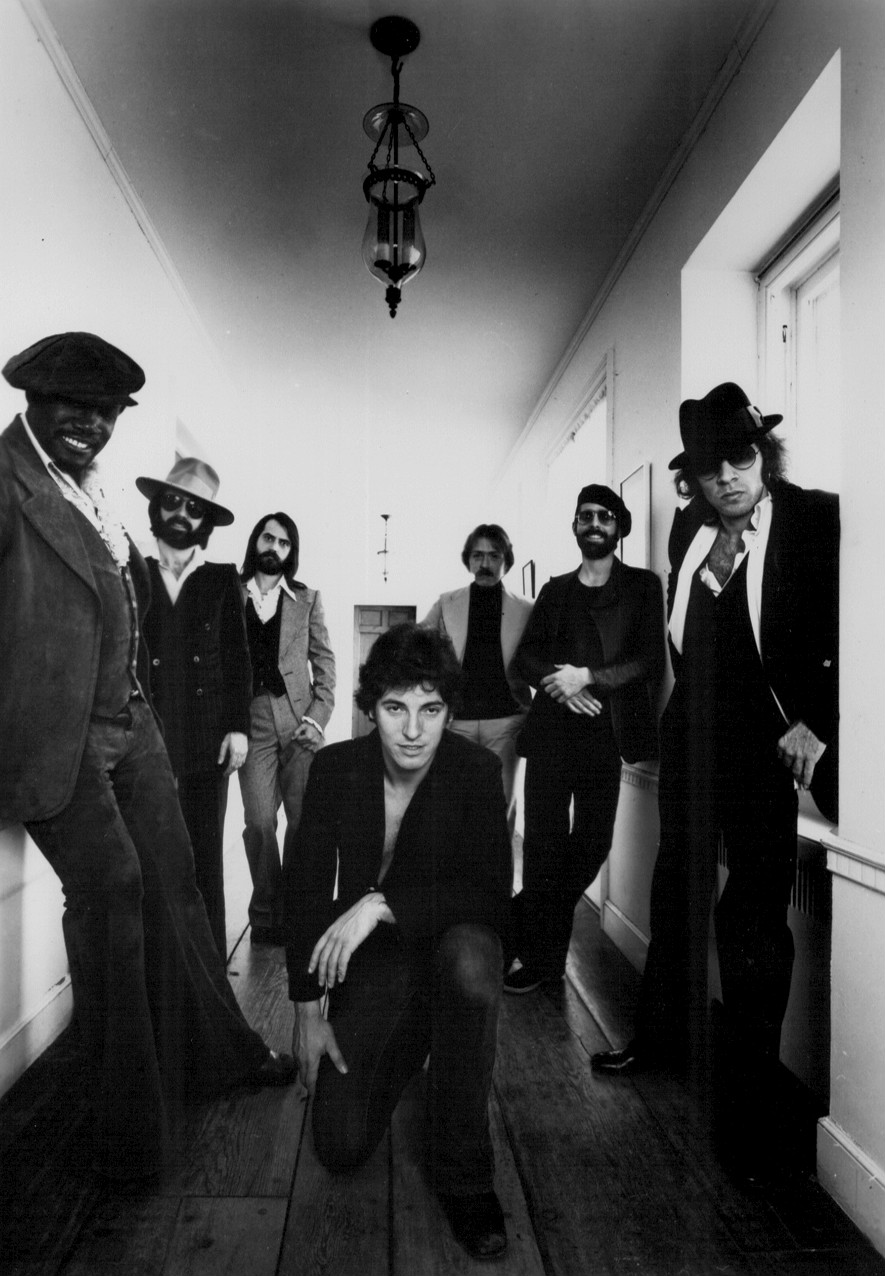
Springsteen and the E Street Band in February 1977

Born to Run was released in August 1975. It proved to be a breakthrough album that catapulted Springsteen to worldwide fame. The album peaked at No. 3 on the Billboard Top LPs & Tape chart, eventually going seven times platinum in the US. The album's two singles, "Born to Run" and "Tenth Avenue Freeze-Out" reached No. 23 and 83, respectively, on the Billboard Hot 100. According to author Louis Masur, the album's success was tied to the fears of growing old held by a generation of late teenagers. In October 1975, Springsteen appeared on the covers of Newsweek and Time in the same week, becoming the first artist to do so. The magazines' cover stories resulted in a media backlash, as critics began wondering if Springsteen was for real or the product of record company promotion. Springsteen was hurt by the backlash and disliked his newfound attention. When the E Street Band arrived in London for their first concerts outside North America, Springsteen personally tore down promotional posters in the lobby of the Hammersmith Odeon.

A legal battle with Appel kept Springsteen out of the studio for nearly a year, during which time he kept the E Street Band together through extensive touring across the U.S. and continued writing new material. Reaching a settlement with Appel in May 1977, Springsteen returned to the studio, and the subsequent nine-month recording sessions with the E Street Band produced Darkness on the Edge of Town. The record stripped the "Wall of Sound" production of Born to Run for a rawer hard rock sound. Its lyrics focus on ill-fortuned people who fight back against overwhelming odds.

Released in June 1978, Darkness on the Edge of Town sold fewer copies than its predecessor, but remained on the Billboard chart for 167 weeks, selling three million copies in the U.S. Its three singles—"Prove It All Night", "Badlands", and "The Promised Land"—performed modestly. The supporting Darkness Tour was Springsteen's largest up to that point and featured shows that lasted upwards of three hours in length. The staff of Ultimate Classic Rock said the tour solidified Springsteen and the E Street Band as "one of the most exciting live acts in rock 'n' roll".

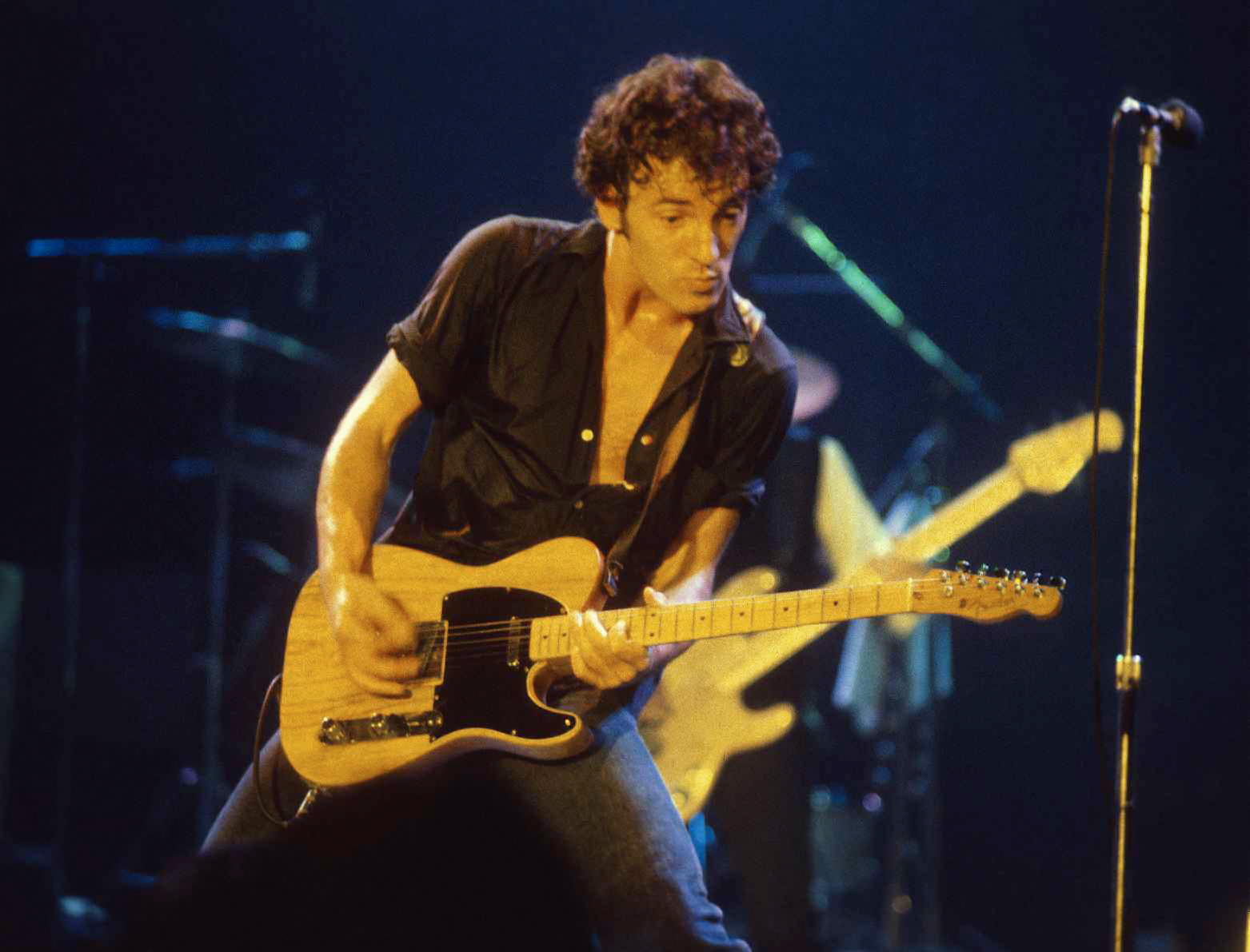
Springsteen performing in New Haven, Connecticut, c. 1977–1978

By the late 1970s, Springsteen earned a reputation as a songwriter whose material could provide hits for other bands. Manfred Mann's Earth Band had achieved a U.S. No. 1 pop hit with a heavily rearranged version of Greetings' "Blinded by the Light" in early 1977. Patti Smith reached No. 13 with her version of Springsteen's unreleased "Because the Night" with revised lyrics by Smith in 1978. The Pointer Sisters hit No. 2 in 1979 with Springsteen's then unreleased "Fire". Between 1976 and 1978, Springsteen provided four compositions to Southside Johnny and the Asbury Jukes, including "The Fever" and "Hearts of Stone", and collaborated on four more with Steven Van Zandt, producer of their first three albums. In September 1979, Springsteen and the E Street Band joined the Musicians United for Safe Energy anti-nuclear power collective at Madison Square Garden for two nights, playing an abbreviated set while premiering two songs from his upcoming album. The subsequent No Nukes live album, as well as the following summer's No Nukes documentary film, represented the first official recordings and footage of Springsteen's fabled live act and Springsteen's first tentative dip into political involvement.

The recording sessions for Springsteen's fifth album, The River, lasted 18 months. The 20-track double album was an attempt at capturing the energy and feel of the E Street Band playing live on stage and featured a mix of party songs and introspective ballads. Released in October 1980, The River became Springsteen's biggest and fastest-selling album yet, topping the U.S. Billboard chart. The single "Hungry Heart" became his first top ten single as a performer, reaching number five, while "Fade Away" reached No. 20.

Several songs on The River foreshadowed the direction of Springsteen's next record, the minimalist, folk-inspired solo effort Nebraska, released in September 1982. Springsteen recorded the songs on the album as demo recordings at his home in Colts Neck, New Jersey, intending to re-record them with the E Street Band, but after poor test sessions he decided to release the recordings as is. The album chronicled dark hardships felt by everyday blue-collar workers, as well as bleak tales of criminals, cops, and gang wars. Nebraska sold minimally compared to Springsteen's three previous albums, but reached No. 3 on the Billboard chart. Nevertheless, it surprised critics, who praised it as a brave artistic statement.

=== 1984–1986: Born in the U.S.A. and cultural phenomenon ===
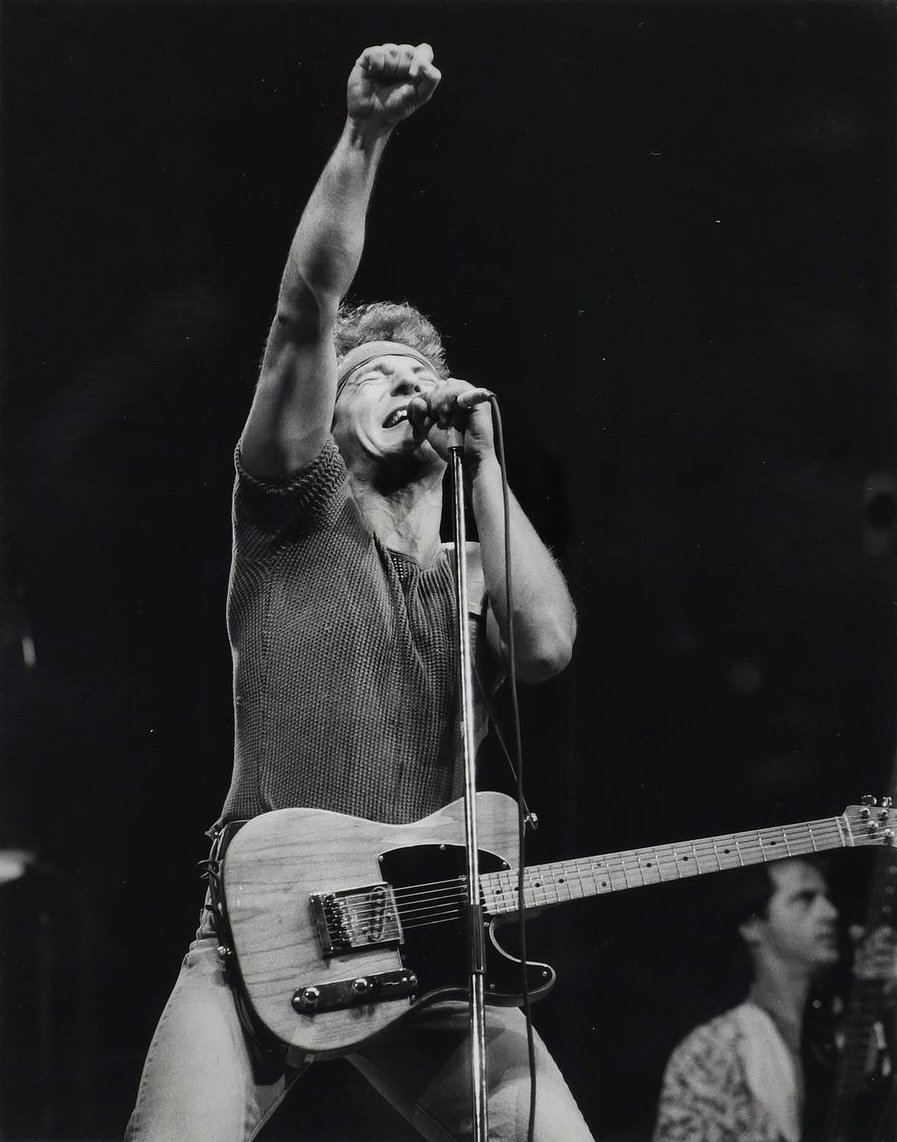
Springsteen performing during the Born in the U.S.A. Tour in 1985

In 1984, Springsteen released Born in the U.S.A., which sold 30 million worldwide, and became one of the best-selling albums of all time, with seven singles hitting the top ten. The title track was a bitter commentary on the treatment of Vietnam veterans, some of whom were Springsteen's friends. The lyrics in the verses were entirely unambiguous when listened to, but the anthemic music and the title of the song made it hard for many, from politicians to the common person, to get the lyrics—except those in the chorus, which could be read many ways. The song made a huge political impact, as he was advocating for the rights of the common working-class man.

The song was widely misinterpreted as patriotic, and in connection with the 1984 presidential campaign became the subject of considerable folklore. In 1984, conservative columnist George Will attended a Springsteen concert and then wrote a column praising Springsteen's work ethic, further discussing his "presumed patriotism" with the usage of the phrase "born in the U.S.A." Six days after the column's publication, then President Ronald Reagan, in the middle of his reelection campaign, praised Springsteen's "patriotism" during a campaign rally in Hammonton, New Jersey. Springsteen responded dismissively to Reagan's comments two days later during a show in Pittsburgh, and from around this time, he began taking time at his shows to talk about his political views. Starting in November, he donated some concert proceeds to local charities or community organizations.

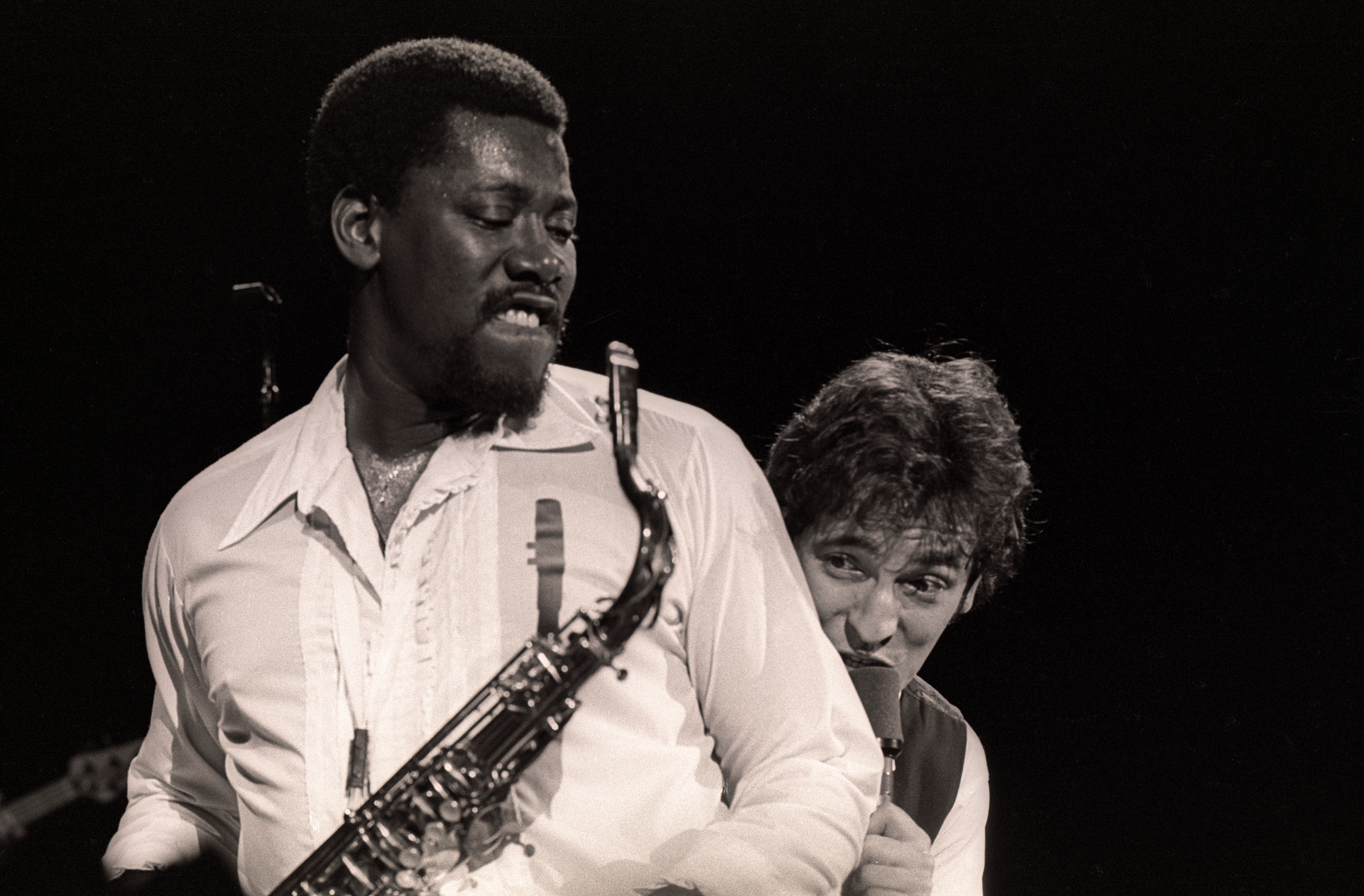
Springsteen and E Street Band member Clarence Clemons performing in Madison, Wisconsin

"Dancing in the Dark" was the biggest of seven hit singles from Born in the U.S.A., peaking at No. 2 on the Billboard singles chart. The video for the song showed a young Courteney Cox dancing on stage with Springsteen, which helped start the actress's career. The song "Cover Me" was written by Springsteen for Donna Summer, but his record company persuaded him to keep it for the new album. A big fan of Summer's work, Springsteen wrote another song for her, "Protection". Videos for Born in the U.S.A. were directed by Brian De Palma and John Sayles. Springsteen played on the "We Are the World" song and album in 1985. His live cover of the Jimmy Cliff song "Trapped" from that album received moderate airplay on U.S. Top 40 stations as well as reaching No. 1 on the Billboard Top Rock Tracks chart.

The Born in the U.S.A. period represented the height of Springsteen's visibility in popular culture and the broadest audience he would ever reach (aided by the release of Arthur Baker's dance mixes of three of the singles). From June 15 to August 10, 1985, all seven of his albums appeared on the UK Albums Chart: the first time an artist had charted their entire back catalogue simultaneously. Live/1975–85, a five-record box set (also on three cassettes or three CDs), was released near the end of 1986 and became the first box set to debut at No. 1 on the U.S. album charts. It is one of the most commercially successful live albums of all time, selling 13 million copies in the U.S. During the 1980s, several Springsteen fanzines were launched, including Backstreets magazine.

=== 1987–1999: Tunnel of Love, Academy Award and Hall of Fame ===
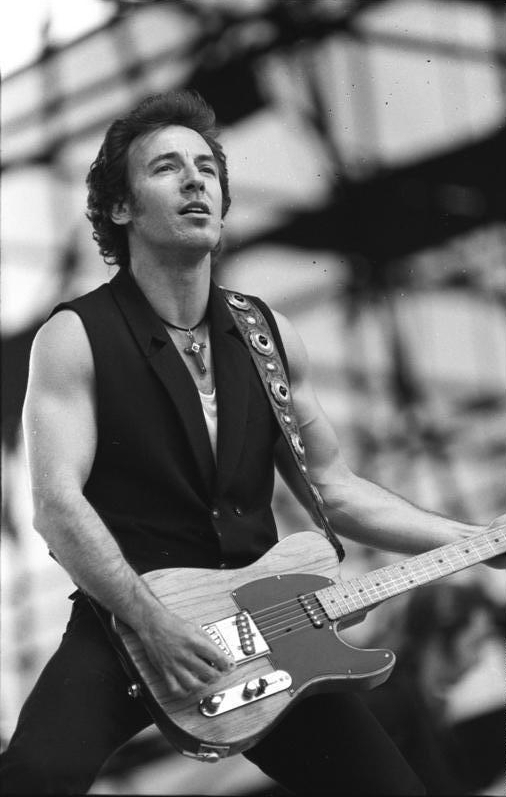
Springsteen performing on the Tunnel of Love Express Tour at the Radrennbahn Weissensee in East Berlin in July 1988

Springsteen released the much more sedate and contemplative Tunnel of Love in October 1987. The album is a mature reflection on the many faces of love found, lost and squandered, and the full sound of the E Street Band is included only selectively. Although it sold less than Born in the U.S.A., it was a commercial success, reaching No. 1 on the Billboard 200. In June 1988, he played at Villa Park where unusual atmospheric conditions meant the concert could be heard 20 miles away. On July 19, Springsteen's concert in East Germany attracted 300,000 spectators. Journalist Erik Kirschbaum called the concert "the most important rock concert ever, anywhere" in his 2013 book Rocking the Wall. Bruce Springsteen: The Berlin Concert That Changed the World. The concert had been conceived by the Socialist Unity Party's youth wing in an attempt to placate the youth of East Germany, who were hungry for more freedom and the popular music of the West. However, it is Kirschbaum's opinion that the success of the concert catalyzed opposition to the regime in East Germany, and helped contribute to the fall of the Berlin Wall the following year.

Later in 1988, Springsteen headlined the worldwide Human Rights Now! tour for Amnesty International. In October 1989, he dissolved the E Street Band. In 1992, after risking fan accusations of "going Hollywood" by moving to Los Angeles and working with session musicians, Springsteen released two albums at once: Human Touch and Lucky Town. An electric band appearance on the acoustic MTV Unplugged television program (later released as In Concert/MTV Plugged) was poorly received and cemented fan dissatisfaction.

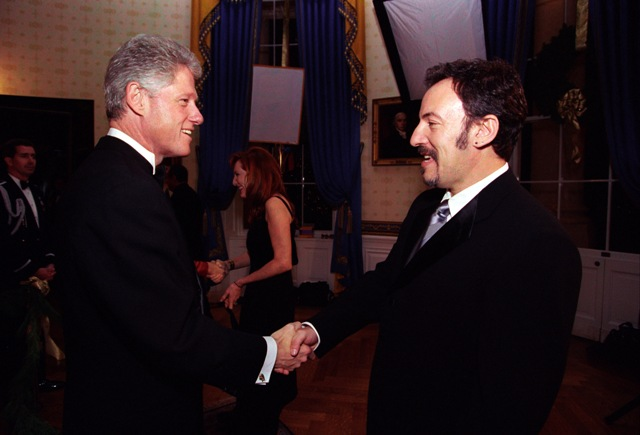
U.S. President Bill Clinton with Springsteen in December 1997

Springsteen won an Academy Award in 1994 for his song "Streets of Philadelphia", which appeared on the soundtrack to the film Philadelphia. The video for the song shows Springsteen's actual vocal performance, recorded using a hidden microphone, to a prerecorded instrumental track. This technique was developed on the "Brilliant Disguise" video. In 1995, after temporarily re-organizing the E Street Band for a few new songs recorded for his first Greatest Hits album (a recording session that was chronicled in the documentary Blood Brothers), and also one show at Tramps in New York City, he released his second folk album, The Ghost of Tom Joad. The album was inspired by John Steinbeck's The Grapes of Wrath and by Journey to Nowhere: The Saga of the New Underclass, a book by Pulitzer Prize-winning author Dale Maharidge and photographer Michael Williamson. Rolling Stone characterized the album as Springsteen's first overtly social statement since Born in the U.S.A., drawing a strong parallel to Nebraska, due to its acoustic nature and Depression-era storytelling sensibility reminiscent of Woody Guthrie. The album is noted for its bleak, unrelenting atmosphere, focusing on characters broken by life's hardships, with few escapes and little musical relief from the dark, desolate scenarios portrayed.

Springsteen supported the album on the lengthy, worldwide, small-venue solo acoustic Ghost of Tom Joad Tour. The tour presented many of his older songs in drastically reshaped acoustic form. Springsteen explicitly reminded his audiences to "shut the fuck up" and not to clap during the performances. Following the Ghost of Tom Joad Tour, Springsteen moved from California back to New Jersey with his family. In 1998, he released the sprawling, four-disc box set of outtakes, Tracks. Later, he would acknowledge that the 1990s were musically a "lost period" for him: "I didn't do a lot of work. Some people would say I didn't do my best work."

Springsteen was inducted into the Rock and Roll Hall of Fame in 1999 by Bono (the lead singer of U2), a favor he returned in 2005. In 1999, Springsteen and the E Street Band reunited and began their extensive Reunion Tour, which lasted over a year. Highlights included a record sold-out, 15-show run at Continental Airlines Arena in East Rutherford, New Jersey and a ten-night, sold-out engagement at New York City's Madison Square Garden. A new song played at these shows, "American Skin (41 Shots)" (about the police shooting of Amadou Diallo), proved controversial.

=== 2002–2007: The Rising, Devils & Dust, and other releases ===
In 2002, Springsteen released his first studio effort with the full band in 18 years, The Rising, produced by Brendan O'Brien. The album, mostly a reflection on the September 11 attacks, was a critical and popular success. The title track gained airplay in several radio formats, and the record became Springsteen's best-selling album of new material in 15 years. Kicked off by an early-morning Asbury Park appearance on The Today Show, The Rising Tour commenced; the band barnstormed through a series of single-night arena stands in the U.S. and Europe. Springsteen played an unprecedented 10 nights at Giants Stadium in New Jersey.

The Rising won the Grammy for Best Rock Album and was nominated for Album of the Year at the 45th Annual Grammy Awards in 2003. In addition, "The Rising" won the Grammy for Best Rock Song and for Best Male Rock Vocal Performance, and nominated for Song of the Year. At the ceremony, Springsteen performed the Clash's "London Calling" with Elvis Costello, Dave Grohl, and E Street Band member Steven Van Zandt and No Doubt's bassist, Tony Kanal, in tribute to Joe Strummer. In 2004, Springsteen and the E Street Band participated in the Vote for Change tour, with John Mellencamp, John Fogerty, the Dixie Chicks, Pearl Jam, R.E.M., Bright Eyes, the Dave Matthews Band, Jackson Browne, and other musicians.

The solo record Devils & Dust was released in April 2005. It is a low-key, mostly acoustic album, in the same vein as Nebraska and The Ghost of Tom Joad. Some of the material was written almost 10 years earlier, during or shortly after the Ghost of Tom Joad Tour; a few of the songs had been performed at that time but unreleased. The title track concerns an ordinary soldier's feelings and fears during the Iraq War. The album topped the charts in ten countries. Springsteen began the solo Devils & Dust Tour at the same time as the album's release, playing both small and large venues. Attendance was disappointing in a few regions, and except in Europe tickets were easier to get than in the past.

In April 2006, Springsteen released We Shall Overcome: The Seeger Sessions, an American roots music project focused around a big folk sound treatment of 15 songs popularized by the radical musical activism of Pete Seeger. A tour began the same month, with the 18-strong ensemble of musicians dubbed the Seeger Sessions Band (and later shortened to the Sessions Band). The tour proved very popular in Europe, selling out everywhere and receiving some excellent reviews, including its opening act in New Orleans, Louisiana following Hurricane Katrina, but newspapers reported that a number of U.S. shows suffered from sparse attendance.

Springsteen's next album, Magic, was released in October 2007. Recorded with the E Street Band, it had 10 new Springsteen songs plus "Long Walk Home", performed once with the Sessions band, and a hidden track (the first included on a Springsteen studio release), "Terry's Song", a tribute to Springsteen's long-time assistant Terry Magovern, who died in July 2007. Magic debuted at No. 1 in the U.S., Ireland and the UK. Springsteen supported the album on the Magic Tour, his first tour with the E Street Band since 2003. It was the final tour for longtime E Street member Danny Federici, who died in 2008.

=== 2008–2011: Political involvement, Super Bowl XLIII, and Kennedy Center Honors ===
Springsteen at a Barack Obama campaign rally
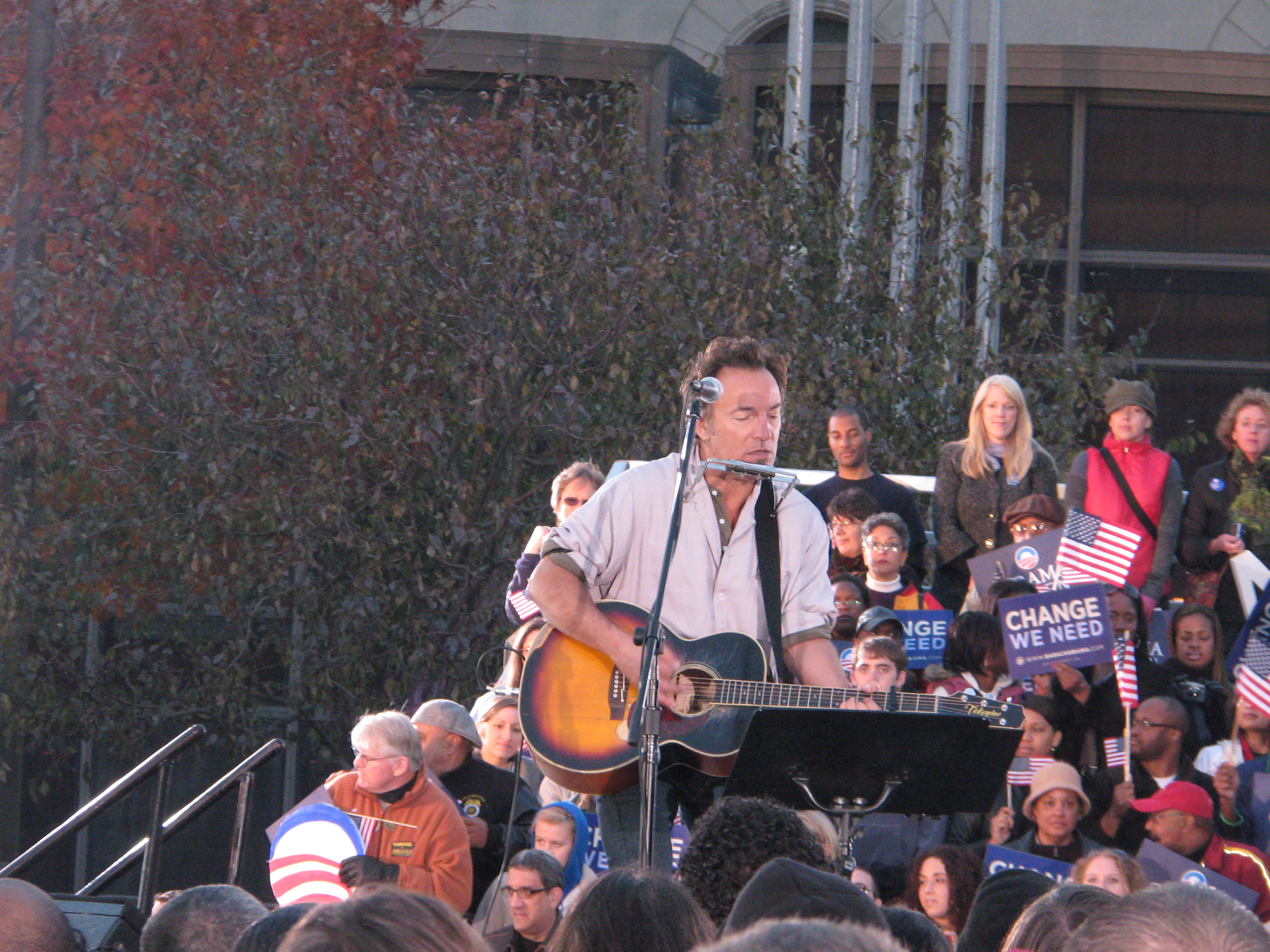
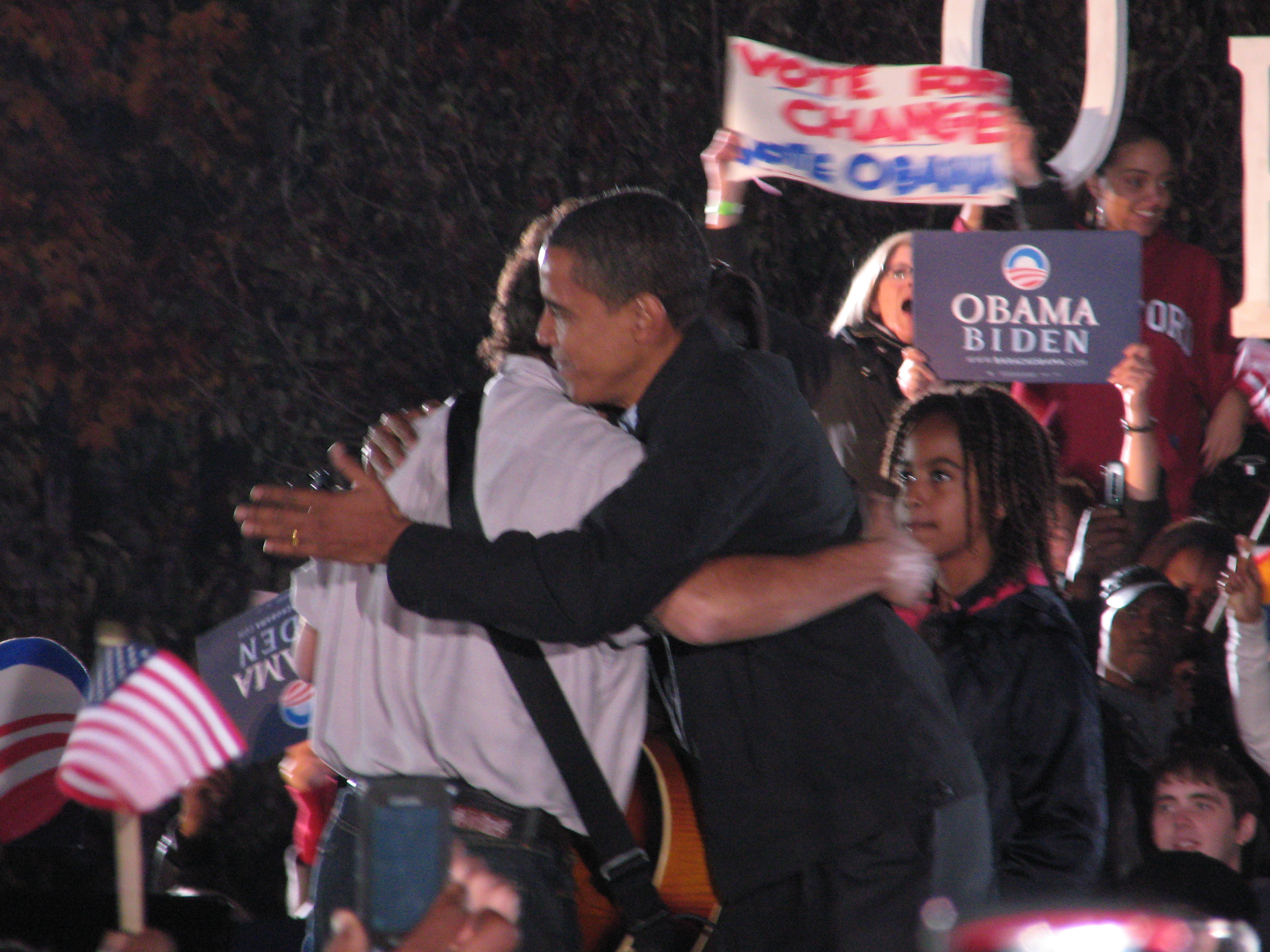
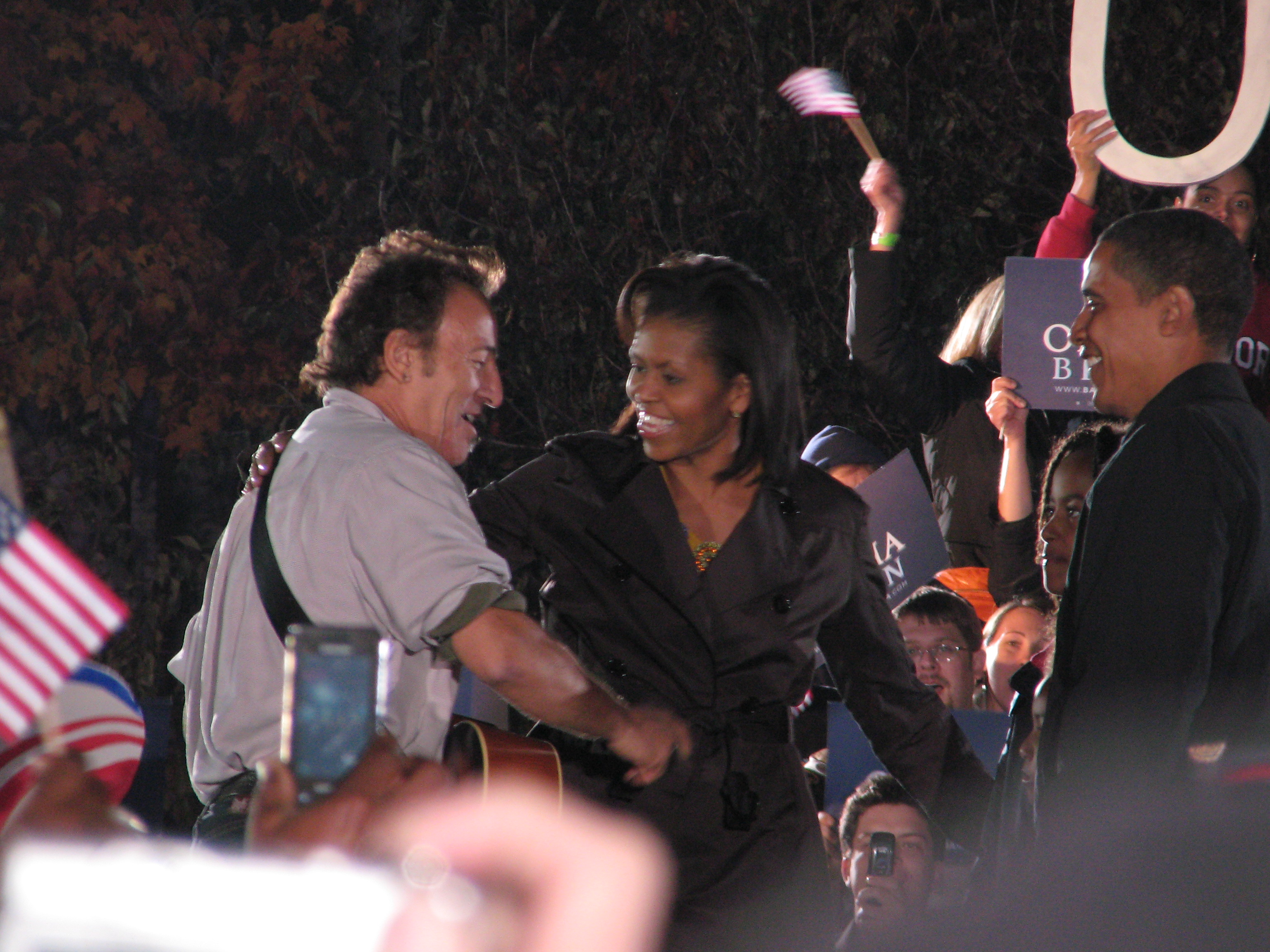
Cleveland, Ohio, on November 2, 2008

Springsteen supported Barack Obama's 2008 presidential campaign. He gave solo acoustic performances in support of Obama's campaign throughout 2008, culminating with a November 2 rally at which he debuted the song "Working on a Dream" in a duet with Scialfa. Following Obama's electoral victory on November 4, Springsteen's song "The Rising" was the first song played over the loudspeakers after Obama's victory speech in Chicago's Grant Park. Springsteen was the musical opener for the Obama Inaugural Celebration on January 18, 2009, which was attended by over 400,000 people. He performed "The Rising" with an all-female choir. Later he performed Woody Guthrie's "This Land Is Your Land" with Pete Seeger.

On January 11, 2009, Springsteen won the Golden Globe Award for Best Song for "The Wrestler", from the Darren Aronofsky film by the same name. After receiving a heartfelt letter from lead actor Mickey Rourke, Springsteen supplied the song for the film for free.

Springsteen performed at the halftime show at Super Bowl XLIII on February 1, 2009, agreeing to perform after having declined on prior occasions. A few days before the game, Springsteen gave a rare press conference at which he promised a "twelve-minute party". It has been reported that this press conference was Springsteen's first press conference in more than 25 years. His 12-minute 45-second set, with the E Street Band and the Miami Horns, included abbreviated renditions of "Tenth Avenue Freeze-Out", "Born to Run", "Working on a Dream", and "Glory Days", the latter complete with football references in place of the original baseball-themed lyrics. The set of appearances and promotional activities led Springsteen to say, "This has probably been the busiest month of my life."

Working on a Dream, dedicated to Federici, was released in late January 2009. The supporting Working on a Dream Tour ran from April to November 2009. The band performed five final shows at Giants Stadium, opening with a new song highlighting the historic stadium, and Springsteen's Jersey roots, named "Wrecking Ball".

Springsteen received the Kennedy Center Honors on December 6, 2009. President Obama gave a speech in which he asserted that Springsteen had incorporated the lives of regular Americans into his expansive palette of songs. Obama added that Springsteen's concerts were not just rock-and-roll concerts, but "communions". The event included musical tributes from Melissa Etheridge, Ben Harper, John Mellencamp, Jennifer Nettles, Sting, and Eddie Vedder.

The 2000s ended with Springsteen named one of eight Artists of the Decade by Rolling Stone magazine and with Springsteen's tours ranking him fourth among artists in total concert grosses for the decade.

Clarence Clemons, the E Street Band's saxophonist and founding member, died on June 18, 2011, of complications from a stroke.

=== 2012–2018: Autobiography and Broadway show ===
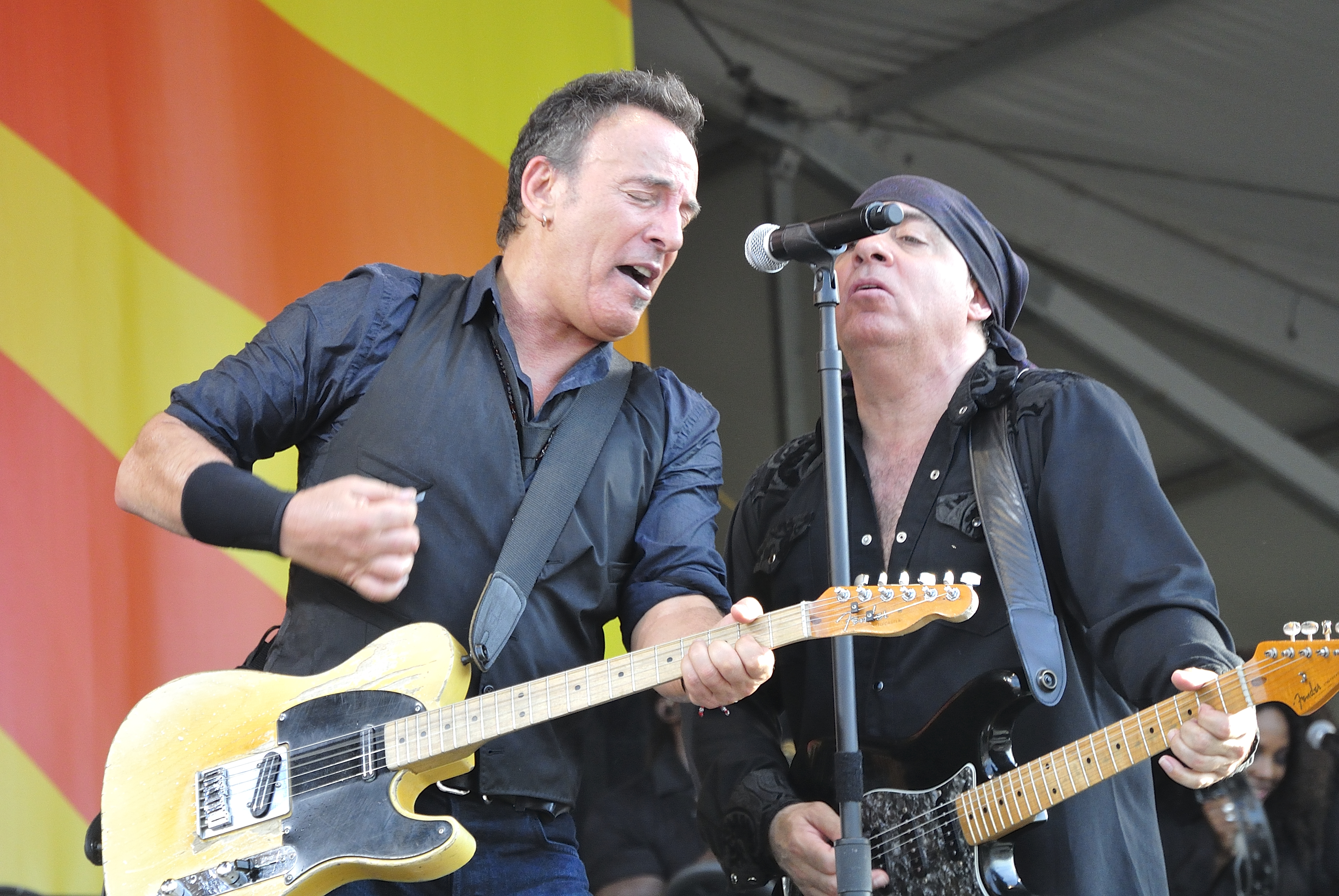
Springsteen and Steven Van Zandt performing at the New Orleans Jazz and Heritage Festival in 2012

Springsteen's 17th studio album, Wrecking Ball, was released in March 2012. The album consists of eleven tracks plus two bonus tracks. Wrecking Ball became Springsteen's tenth No. 1 album in the U.S., tying him with Elvis Presley for third most No. 1 albums of all time, behind the Beatles (19) and Jay Z (12) as of 2009. The supporting Wrecking Ball Tour began shortly after the album's release. On July 31, 2012, in Helsinki, Finland, Springsteen performed his longest concert at four hours and six minutes with 33 songs.

In 2012, Springsteen campaigned for President Barack Obama's re-election in the 2012 presidential election, appearing and performing at Obama rallies in Ohio, Pittsburgh, Iowa, Virginia, and Wisconsin. At the rallies, he briefly spoke to the audience and performed a short acoustic set that included a newly written song titled "Forward".

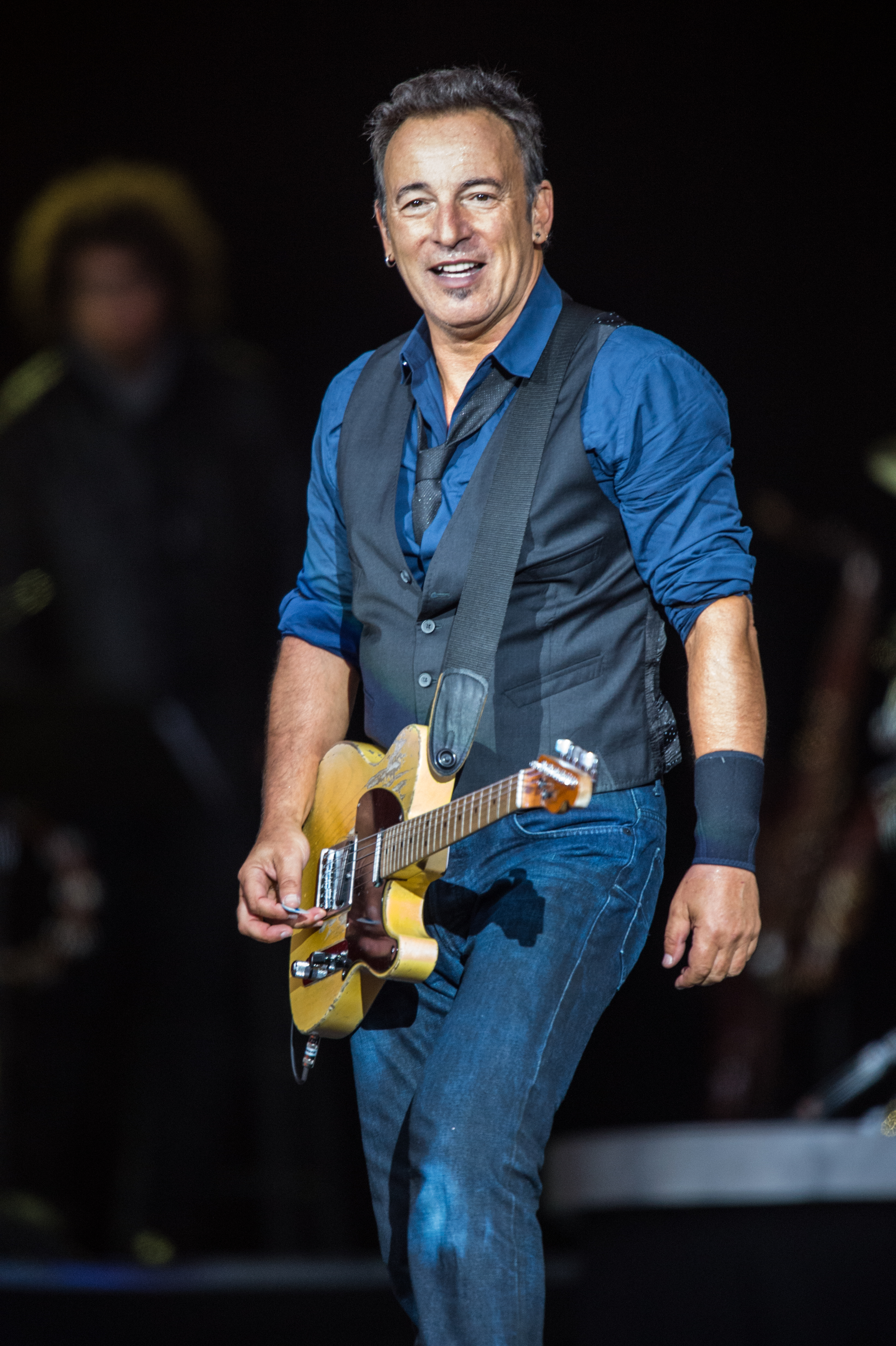
Springsteen in 2012

At year's end, the Wrecking Ball Tour was named Top Draw by the Billboard Touring Awards for having the highest attendance of any tour that year. Financially, the tour grossed second to the one by Roger Waters. Springsteen finished second only to Madonna as the top money maker of 2012, with $33.44 million. The Wrecking Ball album, along with the single "We Take Care of Our Own", was nominated for three Grammy Awards, including Best Rock Performance and Best Rock Song for "We Take Care of Our Own" and Best Rock Album. Rolling Stone named Wrecking Ball the number one album of 2012 on its Top 50 list.

In late July 2013, the documentary Springsteen & I, directed by Baillie Walsh and produced by Ridley Scott, was released simultaneously via a worldwide cinema broadcast in over 50 countries and in movie theaters.

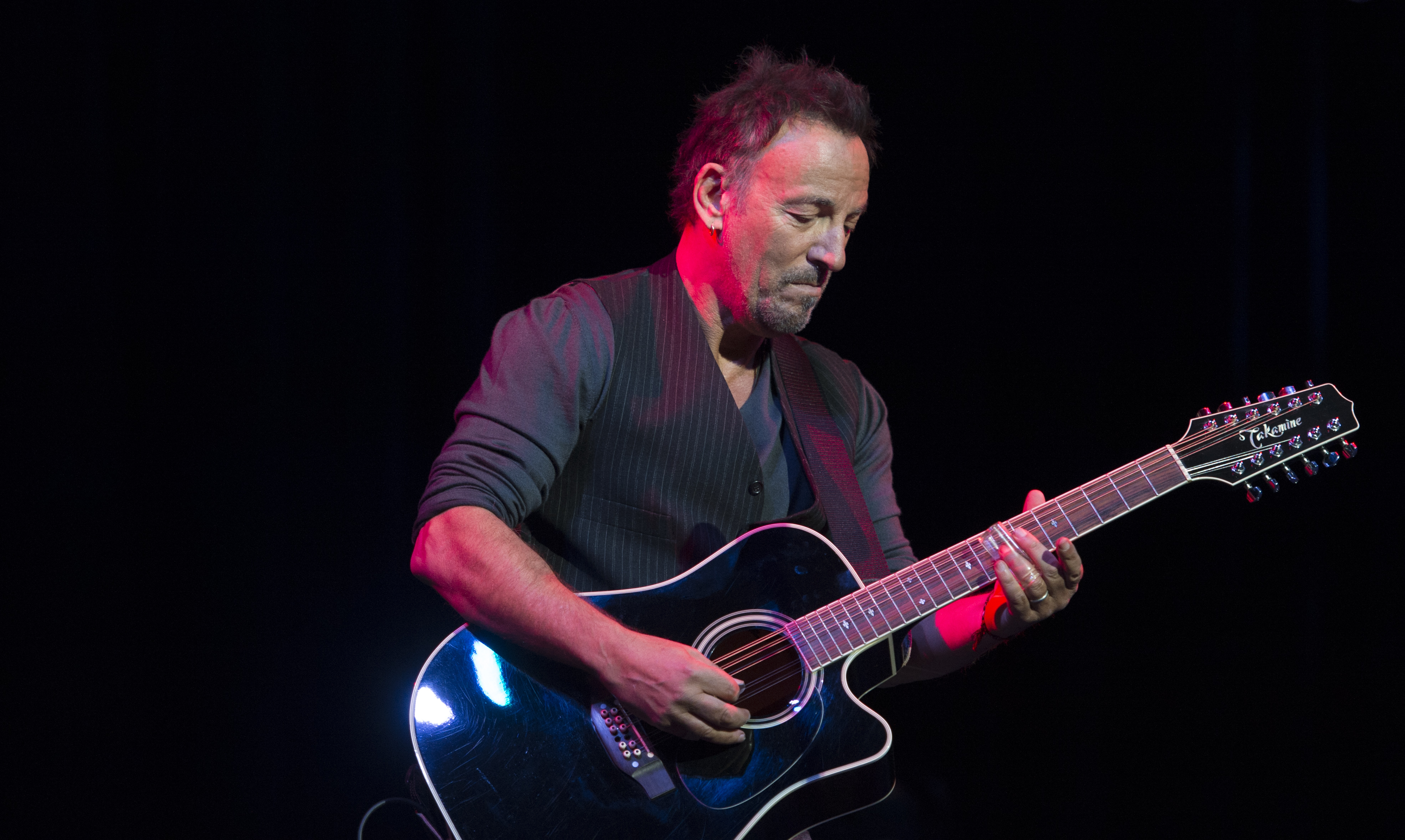
Springsteen performing during the Stand Up for Heroes special, 2014

Springsteen released his eighteenth studio album, High Hopes, in January 2014. The first single and video were of a newly recorded version of the song "High Hopes", which Springsteen had previously recorded in 1995. The album was the first by Springsteen in which all songs are either cover songs, newly recorded outtakes from previous records, or newly recorded versions of songs previously released. The 2014 E Street Band touring lineup appeared on the album, including material recorded with Clemons and Federici before their deaths. High Hopes became Springsteen's eleventh No. 1 album in the US. It was his tenth No. 1 in the UK, tying him for fifth all-time with the Rolling Stones and U2. Rolling Stone named High Hopes the second best album of the year (behind U2's Songs of Innocence) on its Top 50 Albums of 2014 list.

Springsteen made his acting debut in the final episode of season three of Van Zandt's show Lilyhammer, which was named "Loose Ends" after a Springsteen song on the Tracks album.

On August 6, 2015, Springsteen performed on the final episode of The Daily Show with Jon Stewart, as Stewart's final 'Moment of Zen'. On October 16, to celebrate the 35th anniversary of The River, Springsteen announced The Ties That Bind: The River Collection box set. Released on December 4, it contains four CDs (including many previously unreleased songs) and three DVDs (or Blu-ray) along with a 148-page coffee table book. In November 2015, "American Skin (41 Shots)" was performed with John Legend at Shining a Light: A Concert for Progress on Race in America. Springsteen made his first appearance on Saturday Night Live since 2002 on December 19, 2015.

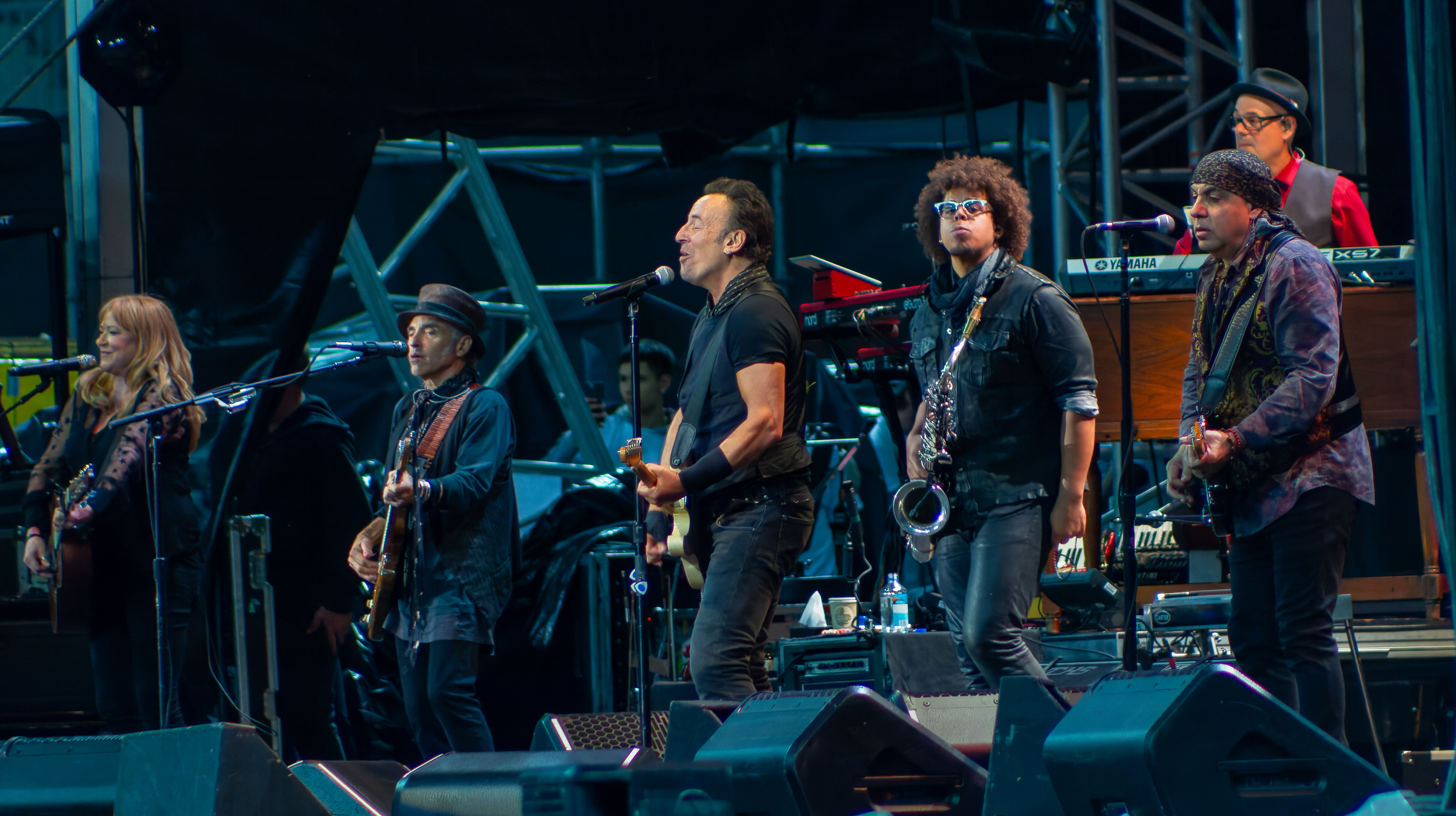
Springsteen and the E Street Band performing at Wembley Stadium in June 2016

The River Tour 2016 began in January 2016 in support of The Ties That Bind: The River Collection box set. All first-leg shows in North America included an in-sequence performance of the entire The River album along with other songs from Springsteen's catalog. In April 2016, Springsteen was one of the first artists to boycott North Carolina's anti-transgender bathroom bill.

Chapter and Verse, a compilation from throughout Springsteen's career dating back to 1966, was released in September 2016. The same month, Simon & Schuster published his 500-page autobiography, Born to Run. The book topped The New York Times bestsellers list.

On September 7, 2016, at Citizens Bank Park in Philadelphia, Pennsylvania, Springsteen performed for four hours and four minutes, his longest-ever show in the United States. The River Tour 2016 was the top-grossing worldwide tour of 2016; it pulled in $268.3 million globally and was the highest-grossing tour since 2014 for any artist.

Springsteen supported Hillary Clinton's 2016 presidential campaign by performing at a rally in Philadelphia on November 7, 2016. On November 22, Springsteen was presented with the Presidential Medal of Freedom award by Barack Obama. On January 12, 2017, Springsteen and Scialfa performed a special 15-song acoustic set for Barack and Michelle Obama at the White House's East Room two days before the president gave his farewell address to the nation.

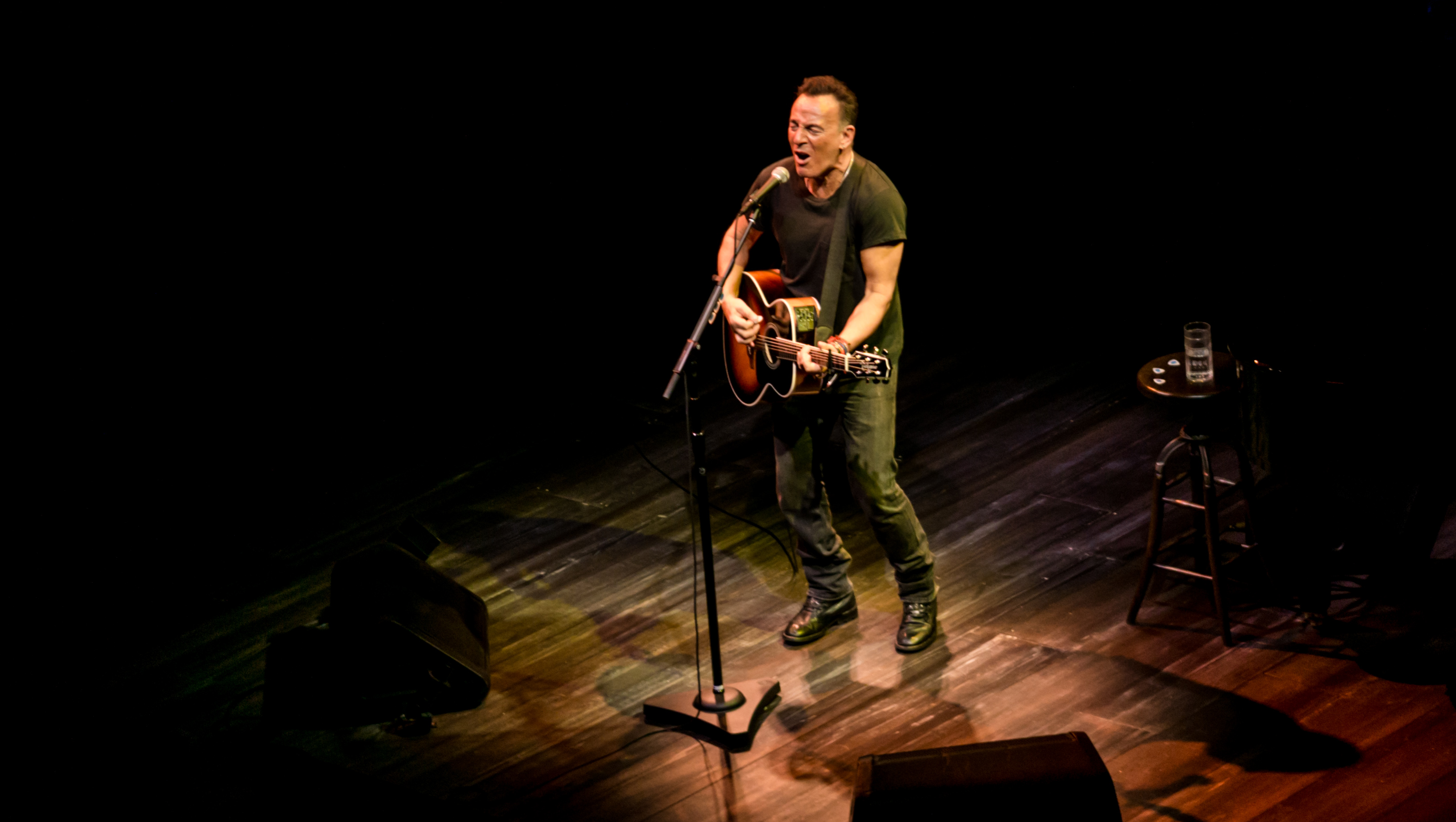
Springsteen during a performance of Springsteen on Broadway in 2017

Springsteen on Broadway, an eight-week run at the Walter Kerr Theatre on Broadway in New York City in fall 2017, was announced in June 2017. The show included Springsteen reading excerpts from his 2016 autobiography Born to Run and performing other spoken reminiscences. Originally scheduled to run from October 12 through November 26, the show was extended three times; the last performance occurred on December 15, 2018. For Springsteen's production of Springsteen on Broadway, he was honored with a Special Tony Award at the 72nd Tony Awards in 2018.

The live album Springsteen on Broadway was released in December 2018. It reached the top 10 in more than 10 countries and No. 11 in the United States.

=== 2019–2021: Western Stars and Letter to You ===
Springsteen's nineteenth studio album, Western Stars, was released in June 2019.

It was announced on July 23, 2019, that Springsteen would premiere his film, Western Stars, at the Toronto Film Festival in September 2019. He co-directed the film along with longtime collaborator Thom Zimny. The film features Springsteen and his backing band performing the music from Western Stars to a live audience. The film was released in theaters in October 2019, and the film's soundtrack, Western Stars – Songs from the Film, was also released that day.

On May 29, 2020, Springsteen appeared remotely during a livestream, no-audience concert by the Dropkick Murphys at Fenway Park in Boston, sharing co-vocals with Ken Casey on two songs. The event marked the first music performance without an in-person audience at a major U.S. arena, stadium, or ballpark during the COVID-19 pandemic. The livestream attracted over 9 million viewers and raised over $700,000 through charitable donations.

Springsteen's twentieth studio album, Letter to You, was released in October 2020. An accompanying documentary of the same name was released the same month. The documentary was shot in black and white and was directed by Thom Zimny. The album was supported by two singles, "Letter to You" and "Ghosts", released in September. Letter to You reached No. 2 in the US, making Springsteen the first artist to release a top-five album in six consecutive decades.

In November, Springsteen was featured as a guest singer for Bleachers' single, "Chinatown". Springsteen and the E Street Band were musical guests on the December 12, 2020, episode of Saturday Night Live, the band's first performance since 2017. Garry Tallent and Soozie Tyrell opted to remain at home due to COVID-19 concerns; this was the first time Tallent had missed a performance with the band.

In February 2021, it was announced that Springsteen was releasing an eight-part podcast on Spotify titled Renegades: Born in the USA that would feature himself in conversation with Barack Obama discussing a wide range of topics including family, race, marriage, fatherhood, and the state of the U.S.

On June 7, 2021, Springsteen announced that his Springsteen on Broadway shows would return for a limited run at Jujamcyn's St. James Theatre beginning on June 26, 2021. In an interview with E Street Radio's Jim Rotolo on June 10, 2021, Springsteen said that he did not plan on playing any shows in 2021 but was talked into the Broadway shows by a "friend". During the same interview, Springsteen also announced an upcoming collaboration with the Killers.

On September 11, 2021, Springsteen performed "I'll See You in My Dreams" in tribute to the victims of the September 11 attacks. He also performed co-lead vocals and guitar on John Mellencamp's song "Wasted Days", which was released in September 2021.

On December 13, 2021, Springsteen gave a surprise four-song performance at the John Henry's Friends benefit concert for children diagnosed with Autism, where he was joined by Steve Earle and the Dukes as his backing band. On December 16, 2021, Springsteen sold the masters of his entire catalog and the coinciding music publishing rights to Sony Music for $500 million. This sale, along with his Broadway shows and projects with Obama, helped him top the Rolling Stone list of the highest-paid musicians of 2021.

=== Since 2022: Only the Strong Survive, collaborations, touring, and The Lost Albums ===
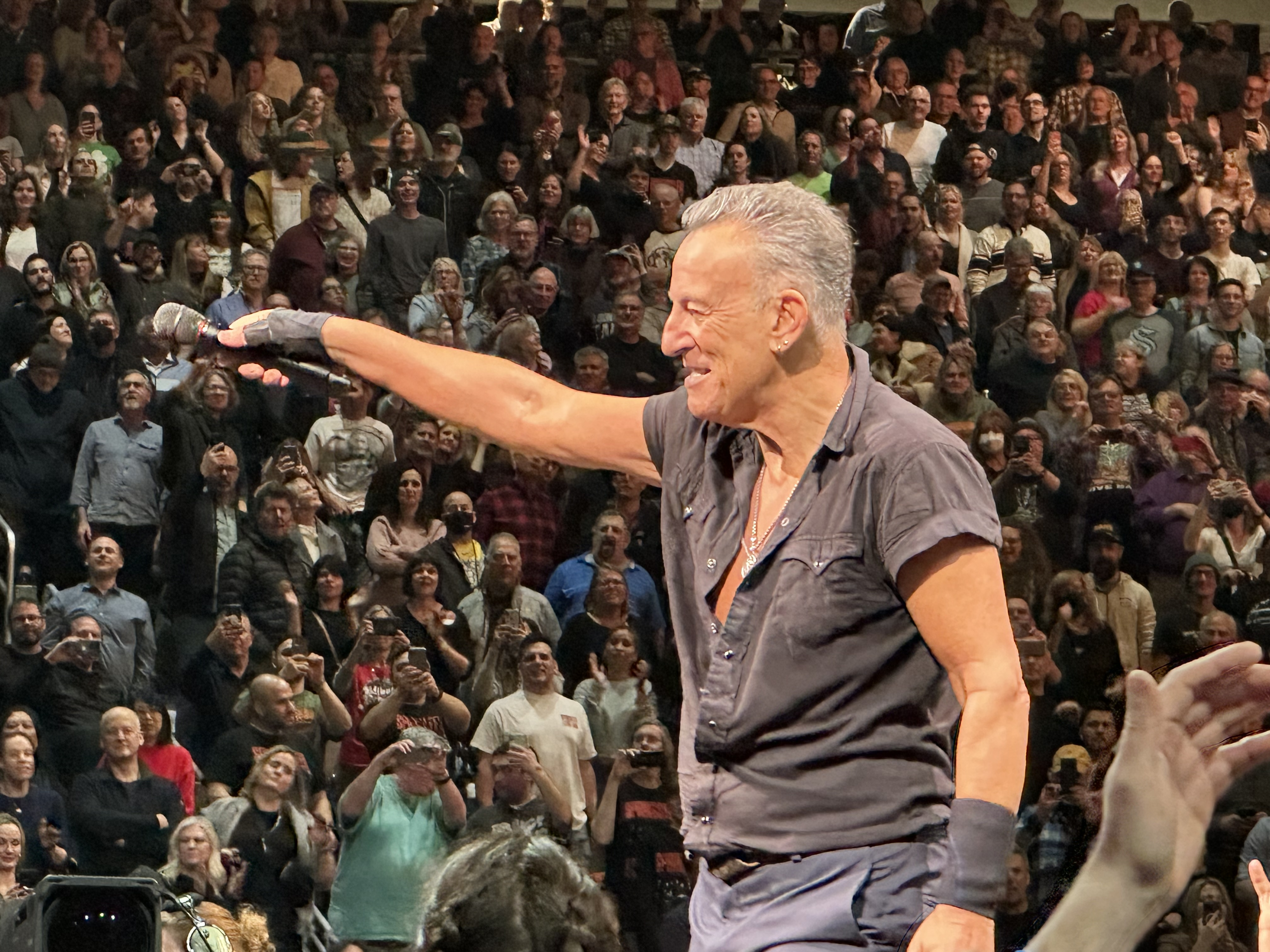
Springsteen performing in Seattle, February 2023

On May 24, 2022, it was announced that he would be launching an international tour with the E Street Band in 2023, the first such since 2017. In November, Springsteen released his twenty-first studio album, Only the Strong Survive, a covers album of classic soul music songs from the 1960s and 1970s. To promote the album, Springsteen performed on The Tonight Show Starring Jimmy Fallon in mid-November, along with a special Thanksgiving episode on November 24.

In a November 2022 interview, Springsteen confirmed that he planned a Volume 2 of the album; at the time, he said it was "probably three-quarters recorded". On February 1, 2023, Springsteen and the E Street band launched their first tour in six years, due to conclude in July 2025.

Springsteen provided vocals on the song "History Books" by the Gaslight Anthem, the title track on the band's October 2023 album. The same month, he collaborated with Bryce Dessner on "Addicted to Romance", an original song for the She Came to Me soundtrack album. In September, Springsteen announced the postponement of eight shows scheduled for September. Springsteen was undergoing treatment for peptic ulcer disease and doctors recommended he not perform live. A few days later, the remaining twelve shows scheduled for November through December 2023 were also postponed to dates in March and April, and between August and November 2024. In total, twenty-nine shows on the tour were postponed due to Springsteen's illness along with Springsteen and other members of the band having COVID-19.

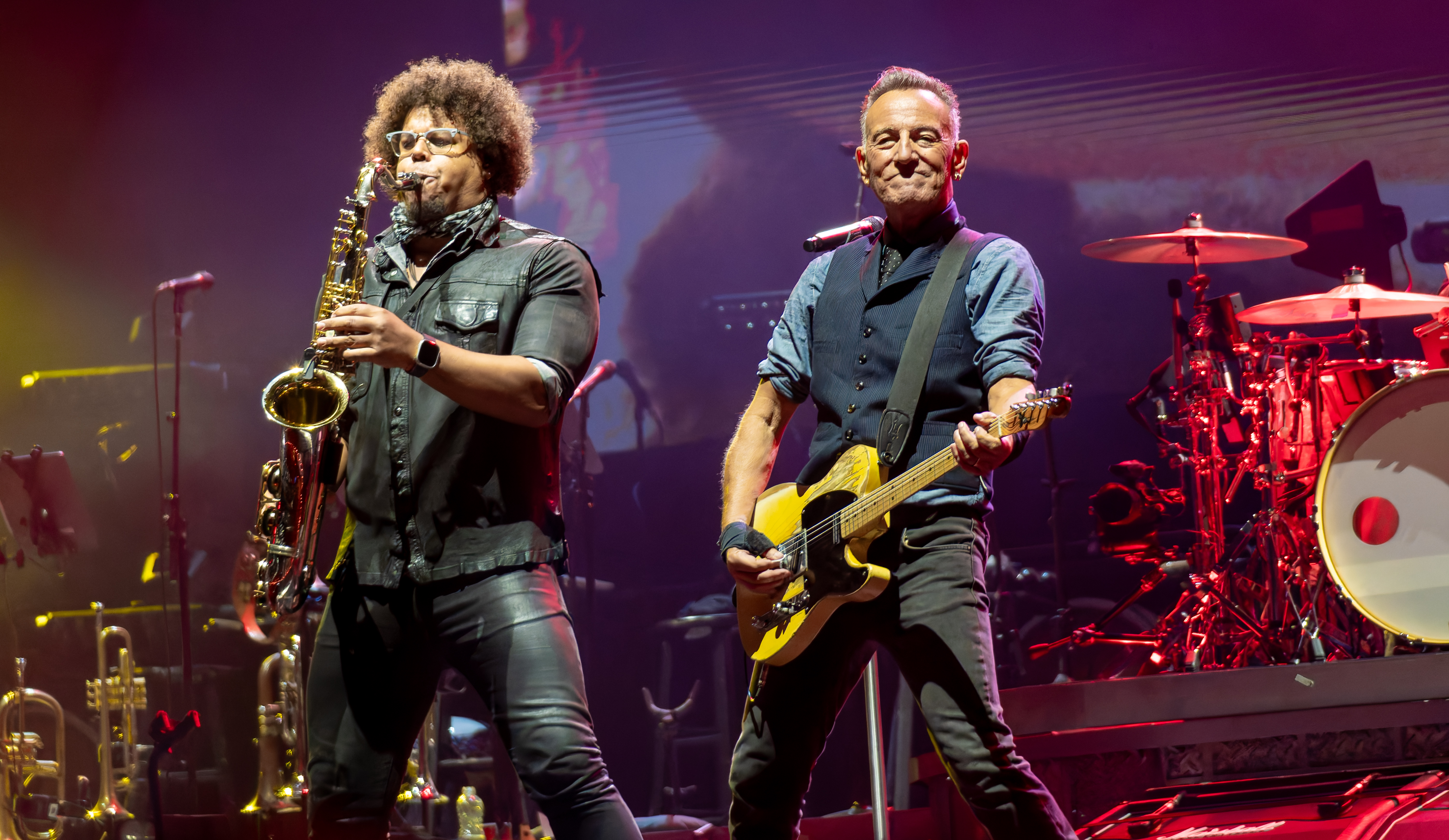
Jake Clemons and Springsteen during a performance in Cardiff in May 2024

In April 2024, 20th Century Studios announced a biographical film, Springsteen: Deliver Me from Nowhere, based on the 2023 book by Warren Zanes about the making of Nebraska. It is written and directed by Scott Cooper; Jeremy Allen White played Springsteen and performed his own singing. That year, Springsteen contributed guitar to a re-release of Mark Knopfler's "Going Home: Theme of the Local Hero" in aid of the Teenage Cancer Trust. His eighth compilation album, Best of Bruce Springsteen, was released on April 19. In October, Disney+ and Hulu released a documentary about Springsteen's 2023–2024 tour, Road Diary: Bruce Springsteen and the E Street Band. The documentary made its debut at the Toronto International Film Festival in September 2024. In July 2024, Forbes reported that Springsteen had a net worth of more than $1.1 billion, thanks to his tours and the sale of his back catalogue in 2021, making him one of the richest celebrities and musicians. During his August 23, 2024, show in Philadelphia, Springsteen denounced rumors of a farewell tour.

In April 2025, Springsteen announced the Tracks II: The Lost Albums collection, which was released on June 27, 2025. It features seven full-length albums of unreleased material dating from 1983 to 2018. The collection includes 83 songs, 74 of which were previously unreleased. A twenty-song companion album, Lost and Found: Selections from The Lost Albums, was also released on June 27. On May 21, 2025, Springsteen released the Land of Hope & Dreams EP. The four-song EP features songs from the tour opener in Manchester on May 14, 2025. A 17-minute documentary entitled Inside Tracks II: The Lost Albums was released on June 20, 2025; it gives viewers an in-depth look at each Lost Album.

In a June 2025 interview with Rolling Stone, Springsteen confirmed that a new solo album is completed and will be released in 2026, Only the Strong Survive, Volume 2 is also completed, and a Tracks III box set will be released in the next three years. Springsteen also at first denied the existence of the long-rumored Electric Nebraska album, but a month after the interview corrected himself and confirmed that songs from those sessions existed. Springsteen discussed the future of the E Street Band, saying he wants to "play more often with less dates" and that "it's very exciting to play with the E Street Band now, and I'm looking forward to doing a good deal of it in the future. But that future is finite." He said he would also like to do another solo tour similar to his Broadway shows. Springsteen said there will never be a farewell tour and that he hopes to still be onstage in his nineties.

Springsteen and the E Street Band's 2023–2025 Tour was the highest-grossing tour of their career grossing close to $730 million worldwide and placing it as one of the top ten highest-grossing tours ever. It more than doubled their previous all-time gross from their 2012–2013 Wrecking Ball Tour. It also made Springsteen one of just five artists ever to have grossed over $2.3 billion touring in his career.

On August 22, 2025, Springsteen released the song "Lonely Night in the Park" to celebrate the upcoming 50th anniversary of the Born to Run album. A low quality version of the song appeared on various fan released bootlegs over the years and in 2005 was briefly played on SiriusXM's E Street Radio channel.

In January 2026, Springsteen released the protest song "Streets of Minneapolis", written and recorded in response to the fatal shootings of protesters Renée Good and Alex Pretti by U.S. federal immigration agents during an enforcement operation in Minneapolis. The song, which Springsteen debuted live the week of its release at a benefit concert in Minneapolis alongside Tom Morello and others, condemns federal immigration enforcement actions and criticizes president Donald Trump's policies, framing the events in the city as a broader call for justice and solidarity with immigrant communities. "Streets of Minneapolis" received widespread attention as part of Springsteen's longstanding tradition of socially engaged songwriting and was highlighted in coverage by major outlets, including Rolling Stone.

On February 17, 2026, Springsteen and the E Street Band announced plans for a twenty-date North American 2026 tour. Titled the Land of Hope and Dreams American Tour, began on March 31 in Minneapolis and will wrap up on May 30 in Philadelphia. The tour is in response to Trump. Tom Morello is set to appear as a special guest on selected songs at every date on the tour.

On March 12, 2026, Springsteen released a cover version of the Pogues song "A Rainy Night in Soho". The song will be featured on the tribute album to Shane MacGowan, 20th Century Paddy - The Songs of Shane MacGowan, which will be released on November 13, 2026.

The Land of Hope and Dreams American Tour began on March 31. The same day, Springsteen received a star at First Avenue in Minneapolis. During Springsteen's show in Washington, D.C., on May 27, he announced that the Power to the People festival will be held on October 3, at Merriweather Post Pavilion in Columbia, Maryland, at which he will join Morello's band.

Springsteen announced that he will be releasing the entire concert from his May 30, 2026, show in Philadelphia, titled Bruce Springsteen and the E Street Band: Land of Hope and Dreams (Philadelphia Cut). The concert will be released in four parts to YouTube with the first part being released on September 9, 2026, and the second part on September 23, 2026.

== Artistry and legacy ==
I spent most of my life as a musician measuring the distance between the American Dream and American reality.

— Springsteen at a rally for presidential candidate Barack Obama on November 2, 2008

Springsteen is one of the most acclaimed American rock performers in history. Widely regarded as one of the greatest songwriters of all time, Springsteen has been called a "rock 'n' roll poet" who "[radiates] working-class authenticity". He is considered a pioneer of heartland rock, a genre combining mainstream rock music with working class thematic concerns and socially conscious lyrics. According to Rolling Stone, his work "epitomizes rock's deepest values: desire, the need for freedom and the search to find yourself." Often described as cinematic in their scope, Springsteen's lyrics frequently explore highly personal themes such as individual commitment, dissatisfaction and dismay with life in a context of everyday situations. Springsteen's themes include social and political commentary and are rooted in the struggles faced by his own family of origin.

A shift in Springsteen's lyrical approach began with the album Darkness on the Edge of Town, in which he focused on the emotional struggles of working class life, alongside more typical rock and roll themes. Reviewing Born in the U.S.A., Rolling Stone critic Debby Miller noted that "Springsteen ignored the British Invasion and embraced instead the legacy of Phil Spector's releases, the sort of soul that was coming from Atlantic Records, and especially the garage bands that had anomalous radio hits. He's always chased the utopian feeling of that music". Despite his commercial success, Springsteen has remained grounded in his working-class roots throughout his career, which researchers at Penn State University say has contributed to his lasting impact.

Jon Pareles included Springsteen among the "pantheon" of artists of the album era. "Springsteen is the quintessential album-era rock star," writes Ann Powers, who argues that while other acts like the Beatles, the Rolling Stones, and Marvin Gaye probably made better individual works, "none [had] used the long-player form itself more powerfully over the arc of a career, not only to establish a world through song, but to inhabit an enduring persona". He used it to lyricize "America's slide from industrial-era swagger into service-economy anomie". In her mind, Springsteen needed the "track-by-track architecture of albums to flesh out characters, relate each to the other, extend metaphors and build a palpable, detail-strewn landscape through which they could travel". He simultaneously grew musically "both with his stalwart E Street Band (a metaphor itself for the family connections and community spirit his songs celebrate or lament) and in more minimalist projects."

Springsteen and the E Street Band have frequently appeared in lists ranking the best live acts of all time. In Forbes, Steve Baltin wrote: "There has never been a live experience in music that captures the feeling of liberation and optimism rock and roll is supposed to bring you more than a Springsteen and the E Street Band show." In January 2023, Rolling Stone named Springsteen the 77th-greatest singer of all time. In April 2023, the governor of New Jersey issued a proclamation announcing September 23 "Bruce Springsteen Day".

Springsteen's songs have been the subject of various scholarly articles analyzing his music and lyrics. The Bruce Springsteen Special Collection houses academic journals and papers on Springsteen published since the 1980s. Springsteen himself said in 2001: "The Collection has almost 1,000 books and magazines on myself and the band–more stuff than every place except my mother's basement!"

In 2003, Rolling Stone's 500 Greatest Albums of All Time list included Born to Run (18), Born in the U.S.A. (85), The Wild, the Innocent & the E Street Shuffle (132), Darkness on the Edge of Town (151), Nebraska (224), The River (250), Greetings from Asbury Park, N.J. (379), and Tunnel of Love (475). In 2004, on their 500 Greatest Songs of All Time list, Rolling Stone included "Born to Run" (21), "Thunder Road" (86), and "Born in the U.S.A." (275). In 2010, Rolling Stone ranked Springsteen 23rd on its list of the "100 Greatest Artists of All Time", describing him as "the embodiment of rock and roll".

The Bruce Springsteen Center for American Music on the campus of Monmouth University opened in June 2026. Expanding beyond the archive of his own work, its mission is now "preserving the legacy of Bruce Springsteen, and celebrating the history of American music and its diversity of artists and genres."

== Equipment ==
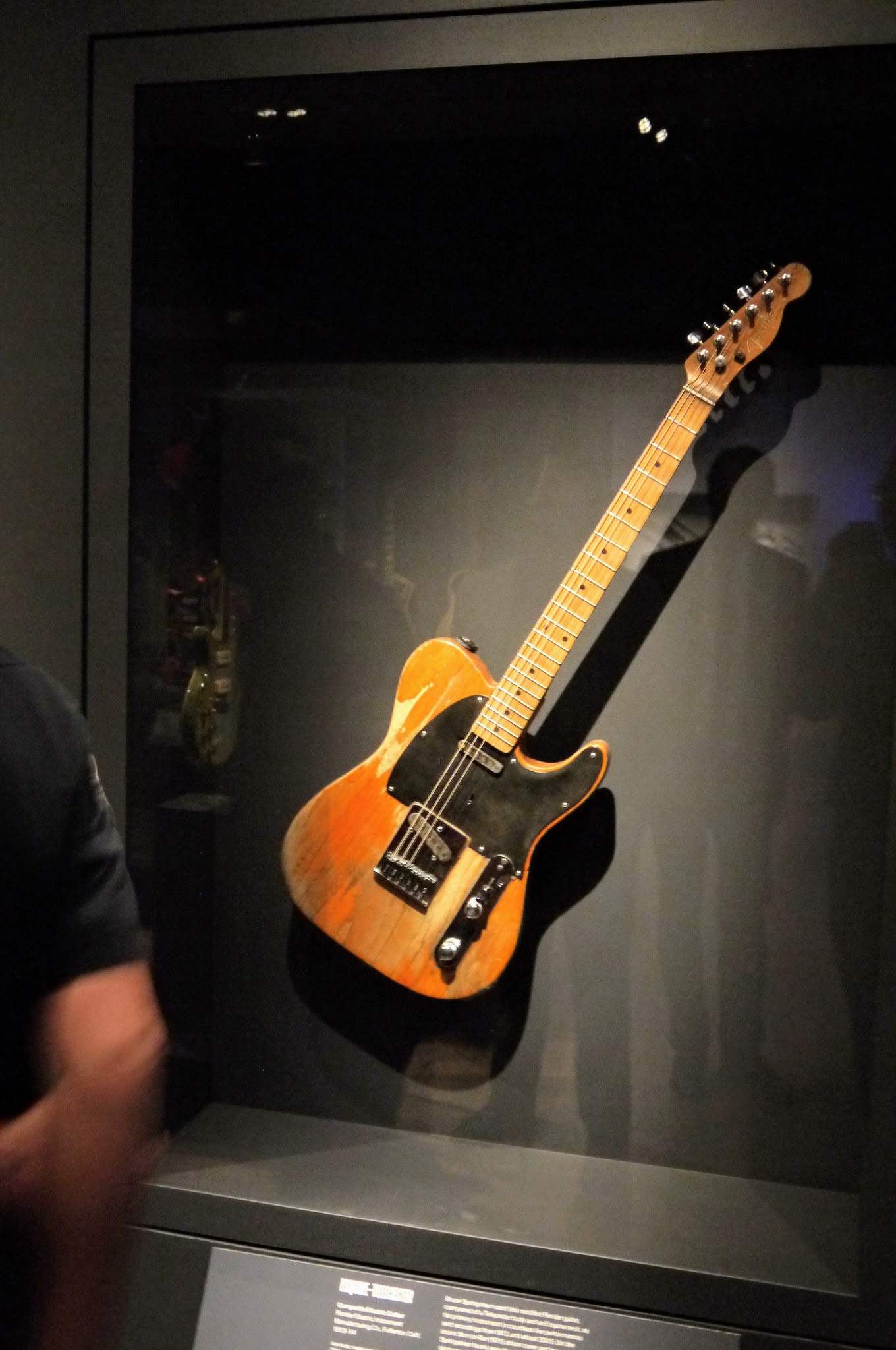
Springsteen's modified Telecaster at the Metropolitan Museum of Art's "Play It Loud: Instruments of Rock & Roll" exhibition in 2019.

At the age of 22, Springsteen acquired what would become his primary guitar for $185 from a luthier in Belmar, New Jersey. The guitar was a heavily modified Fender Telecaster that Springsteen has described as a "mutt". A previous owner had replaced the neck with one from a mid-1950s Esquire and routed the swamp ash body to accommodate four pickups all wired into separate jacks. Prior to Springsteen buying the guitar, the luthier had restored conventional Telecaster electronics, in addition to upgrading the hardware; the body's routing left it feeling lightweight compared to a stock Telecaster, which would come to suit Springsteen's long performances.

Springsteen used the mutt Telecaster in almost every concert for thirty years. Wear and tear forced him to retire it in the 2000s, although the Mutt still comes out for special occasions like his 2009 Super Bowl XLIII halftime show performance. The guitar also appeared on the covers of his albums Born to Run (1975), Live 1975–85 (1986), Human Touch (1992), Greatest Hits (1995), and Wrecking Ball (2012). Springsteen said of his guitar, "I've played this for so long that it just became part of [my] natural physique."

Since retiring the mutt Telecaster, Springsteen uses custom-made replicas for concerts. Insurance estimates place the original guitar's value at $1 to 5 million.

== Personal life ==
=== Relationships ===
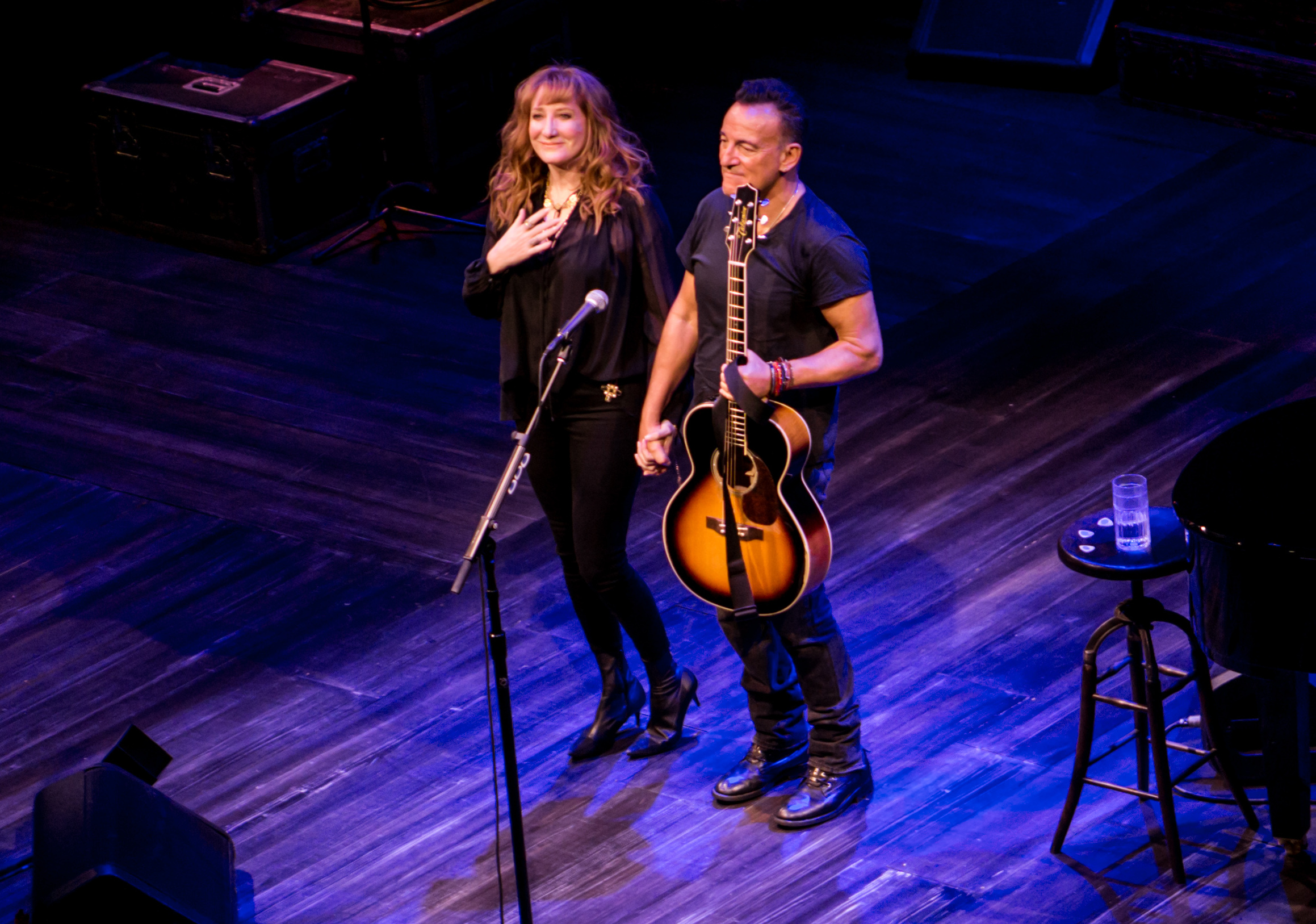
Springsteen with his wife Patti Scialfa, a member of the E Street Band, during a 2017 performance of Springsteen on Broadway

Springsteen briefly dated artist Karon Bihari in the 1970s, who claimed the Darkness on the Edge of Town song "Candy's Room" was about her. He also had relationships with photographer Lynn Goldsmith, model Karen Darvin, and, for four years in the 1980s, actress Joyce Hyser.

In the early 1980s, he met Patti Scialfa at the Stone Pony the evening she was performing alongside his friend Bobby Bandiera, with whom she wrote "At Least We Got Shoes" for Southside Johnny. Springsteen liked her voice and after the performance he introduced himself to her. They soon started spending time together and became friends.

Early in 1984, Springsteen asked Scialfa to join the E Street Band for the Born in the U.S.A. Tour, which began in June 1984. According to the book Bruce by Peter Ames Carlin, they seemed about to become a couple through the first leg of the tour, but Springsteen was introduced to actress Julianne Phillips and married her shortly after midnight on May 13, 1985, at Our Lady of the Lake Catholic Church in Lake Oswego, Oregon. Opposites in background, the two had an 11-year age difference and Springsteen's traveling took its toll on their relationship. Many of the songs on Tunnel of Love described the unhappiness he felt in his relationship with Phillips.

The Tunnel of Love Express Tour began in February 1988 and Springsteen convinced Scialfa to postpone her own solo record and join the tour. Scialfa moved in with Springsteen shortly after he separated from Phillips. On August 30, 1988, citing irreconcilable differences, Phillips filed for divorce in Los Angeles, and a settlement was reached in December and finalized on March 1, 1989.

Springsteen received press criticism for the apparent haste in which he and Scialfa started their relationship. In a 1995 interview with The Advocate, he told Judy Wieder about the negative publicity the couple subsequently received: "It's a strange society that assumes it has the right to tell people whom they should love and whom they shouldn't. But the truth is, I basically ignored the entire thing as much as I could. I said, 'Well, all I know is, this feels real, and maybe I have got a mess going here in some fashion, but that's life.'" Years later, he reflected, "'I didn't protect Juli... some sort of public announcement would have been fair, but I felt overly concerned about my own privacy. I handled it badly, and I still feel badly about it. It was cruel for people to find out the way they did.'"

Springsteen and Scialfa lived in New Jersey before moving to Los Angeles, where they decided to start a family. On July 25, 1990, Scialfa gave birth to the couple's first child, a son. On June 8, 1991, Springsteen and Scialfa married at their Los Angeles home in a private ceremony, only attended by family and close friends. Their second child, Jessica Rae Springsteen, was born on December 30, 1991. Their third child, a son, was born on January 5, 1994. In a 1995 interview, Springsteen said, "I went through a divorce, and it was really difficult and painful and I was very frightened about getting married again. So part of me said, 'Hey, what does it matter?' But it does matter. It's very different than just living together. First of all, stepping up publicly—which is what you do: You get your license, you do all the social rituals—is a part of your place in society and in some way part of society's acceptance of you ... Patti and I both found that it did mean something."

When their children reached school age in the 1990s, Springsteen and Scialfa moved back to New Jersey to raise them away from paparazzi. The family owns and lives on a horse farm in Colts Neck Township and has a home in Rumson; they also own homes in Los Angeles and Wellington, Florida. Evan graduated from Boston College; he writes and performs his own songs and won the 2012 Singer/Songwriter Competition held during Boston College's Arts Festival. Jessica graduated from Duke University and is a nationally ranked champion equestrian. She made her show-jumping debut with Team USA in August 2014. Sam is a firefighter in Jersey City. On July 17, 2022, Springsteen and Scialfa became grandparents when their son, Sam, and his fiancée had a daughter. He has been open about his struggles with depression and says "Just naming it can help."

=== Health ===
Springsteen has avoided hard drugs his entire life. Van Zandt said in 2012, "[Springsteen is] the only guy I know—I think the only guy I know at all—who never did drugs." Springsteen has spoken about his struggles with depression, which he began to address in his 30s after years of denial. During this time, he also became frustrated with being an underweight "fast food junkie" who had to be helped off the stage after a show due to his poor health. He later began following a mostly vegetarian diet while running up to six miles on a treadmill and lifting weights three times a week. A 2019 Consequence article celebrating his 70th birthday revealed that he still maintains this routine and diet. In September 2023, Springsteen announced the postponement of all his concerts in the U.S. beginning in that month and through December, due to his ongoing treatment for peptic ulcer disease.

=== Religion ===
While rejecting religion in his earlier years, Springsteen stated in his 2016 autobiography Born to Run, "I have a personal relationship with Jesus. I believe in his power to save, love [...] but not to damn." In terms of his lapsed Catholicism, he said that he "came to ruefully and bemusedly understand that once you're a Catholic you're always a Catholic ... I don't participate in my religion but I know somewhere... deep inside... I'm still on the team."

=== Wealth ===
In a 2017 interview with Tom Hanks, Springsteen admitted that he evaded taxes early in his career since the government had not paid attention to his taxes prior to his 1975 appearance on the cover of Time. Most of his income over the next several years went towards paying back his taxes; by his 30th birthday, he had only $20,000, despite multiple bestselling records and tours. Forbes estimated Springsteen's net worth at US$1.2 billion in 2026.

=== Hobbies ===
Springsteen is a model railroader. He collects and runs HO scale model trains. He is an avid reader: "I'm a fan of Philip Roth, John Cheever, Jim Thompson, James M. Cain, Flannery O'Connor, all the Russian guys..." He says "These authors contributed greatly to the turn my music took around 1978-82. They brought out a sense of geography and the dark strain in my writing, broadened my horizons about what might be accomplished with a pop song and are still the cornerstone literally for what I try to accomplish today." He says the book that changed his life is Joe Klein's Woody Guthrie: A Biography.

== Political views and activism ==
Early in his career, Springsteen was apolitical. Aside from performing at a fundraiser for George McGovern's presidential campaign in Red Bank, New Jersey, in July 1972, Springsteen refrained from supporting political candidates. On November 5, 1980, he made a rare political statement against President-elect Ronald Reagan during the River Tour at the show in Tempe, Arizona, the day following 1980 presidential election. In late August 1981, Springsteen and the E Street Band performed a benefit show for the Vietnam Veterans of America (VVA). The event was a major success for the VVA, which was running out of funds at the time, and, according to the author Peter Ames Carlin, was a "significant step for the Vietnam vets movement in general".

Springsteen's political impact became much more prominent during the Born in the U.S.A. Tour. The conservative political commentator George Will attended the show in Largo, Maryland, on August 25. The following month, Will published a column in The Washington Post about Springsteen, wherein he praised the performer's work ethic and discussed his "presumed patriotism" with the usage of the phrase "born in the U.S.A." Less than a week after the column's publishing, Ronald Reagan, in the middle of his reelection campaign, praised Springsteen's "patriotism" during a campaign rally in Hammonton, New Jersey. Springsteen responded dismissively to Reagan's comments two days later during a show in Pittsburgh. Beginning with the Born in the U.S.A. Tour, Springsteen has donated to local food banks and other poverty-focused causes on every subsequent tour.

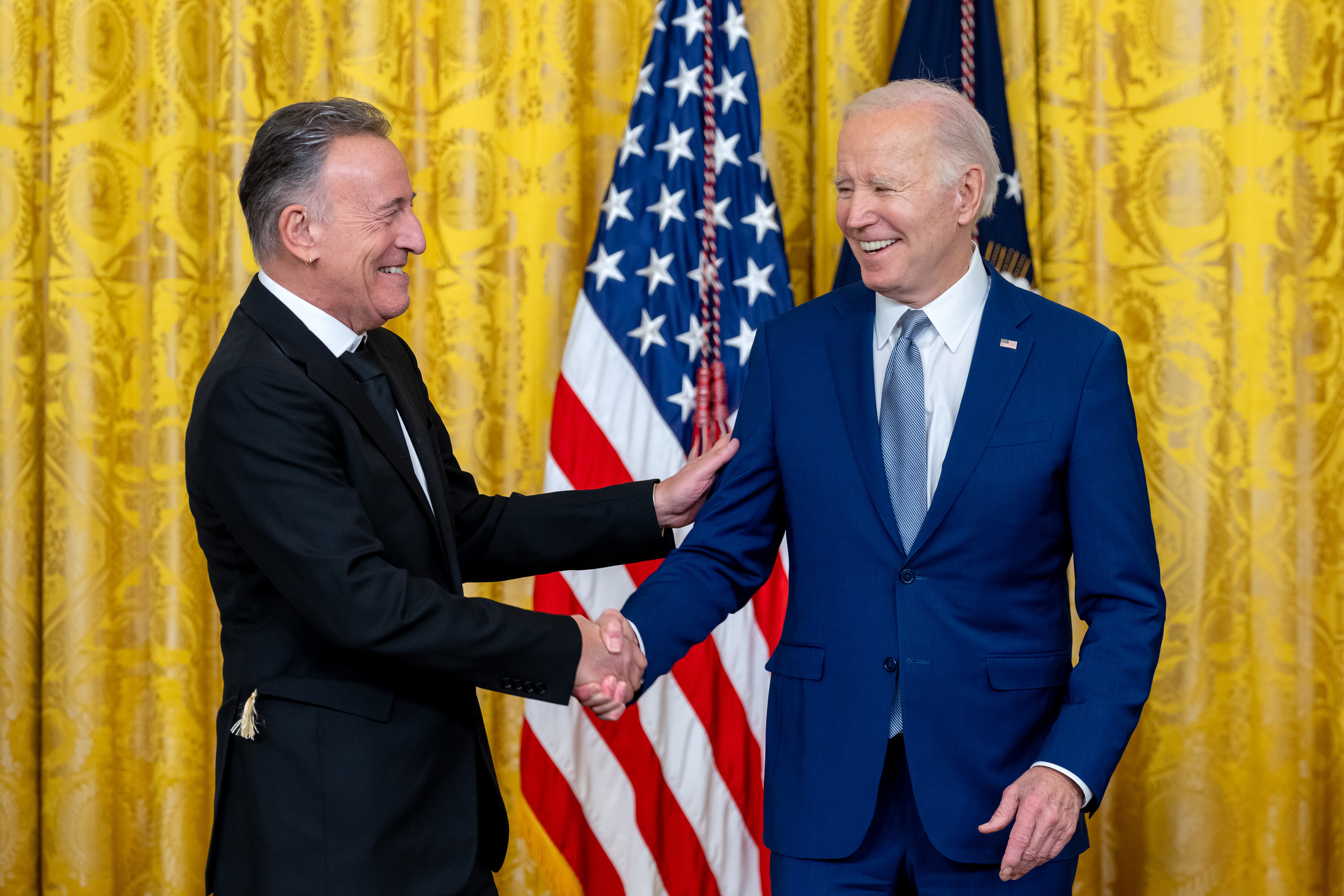
Springsteen with U.S. President Joe Biden in the East Room at the White House in March 2023

Springsteen became a larger political advocate in the 1990s. After relocating to California, he opposed anti-immigration initiatives. He endorsed a political candidate for the first time in 2004 with John Kerry, and has since publicly endorsed Democratic presidential candidates Barack Obama in 2008 and 2012, Hillary Clinton in 2016, Joe Biden in 2020, and Kamala Harris in 2024.

Springsteen is a staunch critic of Donald Trump, whom he calls the "conman from Queens". During Trump's first term as president of the United States in October 2019, Springsteen said Trump "doesn't have a grasp of the deep meaning of what it means to be an American", and in June 2020 called him a "threat to our democracy". Following Trump's 2024 reelection, Springsteen became more outspoken against him. At a show in May 2025, Springsteen called Trump's administration "corrupt, incompetent, and treasonous". Two days later, Trump responded on Truth Social by calling Springsteen "highly overrated" and "dumb as a rock". In January 2026, Springsteen spoke out against the Immigration and Customs Enforcement (ICE)'s actions in Minneapolis; he subsequently released the song "Streets of Minneapolis", a protest song written in response to the deaths of Renée Good and Alex Pretti by ICE agents.

In 2026, Springsteen announced the Land of Hope and Dreams American Tour, which he said was in response to Trump. On April 2, 2026, two days after the first show, Trump responded to Springsteen on Truth Social, calling him a "bad, and very boring singer" and asking his supporters to "boycott his overpriced concert" tickets. The American Federation of Musicians defended Springsteen's right to freedom of speech. Despite his outspoken views against Trump, Springsteen denounced political violence against him at a show in Austin, Texas, on April 26, following an attempted assassination on Trump.

Springsteen supports LGBTQ rights and gay marriage. In April 2016, Springsteen cancelled a show in Greensboro, North Carolina, days before it was to take place to protest the state's newly passed Public Facilities Privacy & Security Act, also referred to as the "bathroom law", which dictates which restrooms transgender people are permitted to use and prevents LGBTQ citizens from suing over human rights violations in the workplace. Springsteen released a statement on his website. The Human Rights Campaign celebrated Springsteen's statement, and he has received praise and gratitude from the LGBTQ community.

== Achievements and awards ==
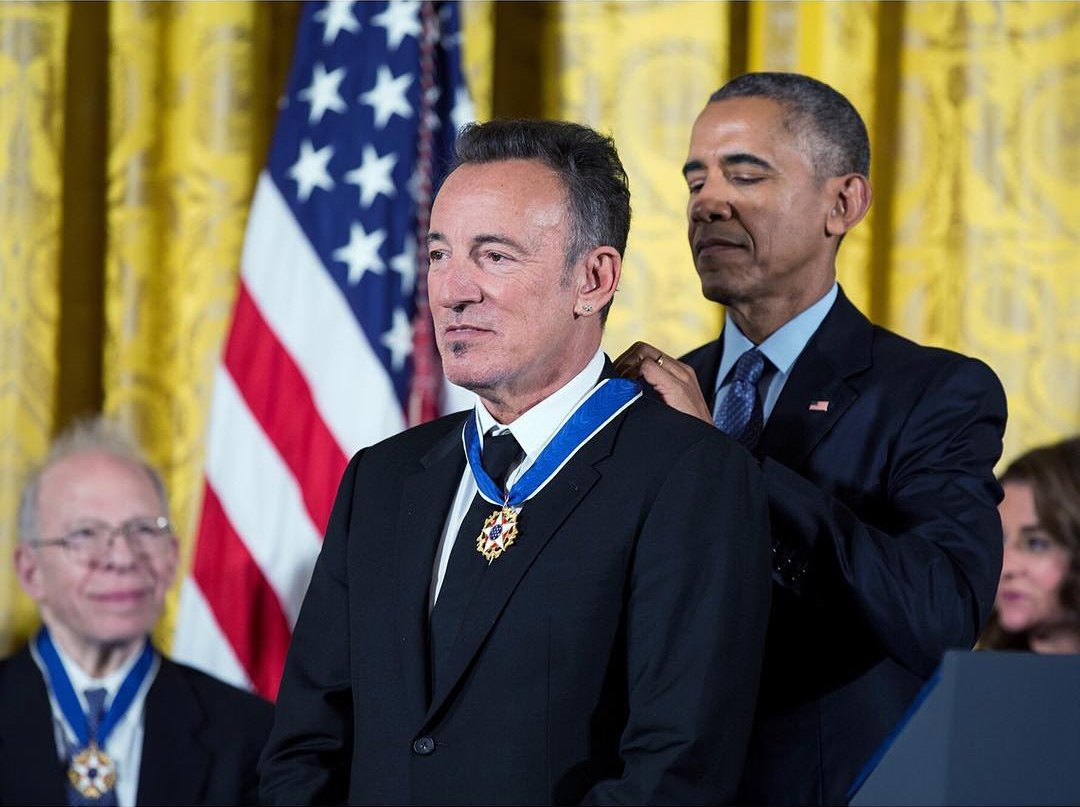
Springsteen receiving the Presidential Medal of Freedom at the White House from President Barack Obama in 2016

Springsteen has sold more than 140 million records worldwide and more than 71 million records in the United States, making him one of the world's best-selling artists. He has earned numerous awards for his work, including 20 Grammy Awards, two Golden Globes, an Academy Award, and a Special Tony Award (for Springsteen on Broadway). Springsteen was inducted into both the Songwriters Hall of Fame and the Rock and Roll Hall of Fame in 1999, received the Kennedy Center Honors in 2009, was named MusiCares person of the year in 2013, and was awarded the Presidential Medal of Freedom by President Barack Obama in 2016.

In May 2021, Springsteen became the eighth recipient of the Woody Guthrie Prize, a prize that honors an artist who speaks out for social justice and carries on the spirit of the folk singer. In March 2023, Springsteen was awarded the 2021 National Medal of Arts from President Joe Biden at the White House. Springsteen was supposed to receive the award in 2021 but the COVID-19 pandemic postponed the ceremonies.

In March 2024, it was announced that Springsteen would be named an Academy Fellow by The Ivors Academy in May 2024. On May 23, 2024, Springsteen became the first international songwriter that the academy has inducted into the Fellowship in its 80-year history.

On October 18, 2025, Springsteen received the Academy Museum of Motion Pictures inaugural Legacy Award "for an artist whose body of work has inspired generations of storytellers and deeply influenced our culture." On November 3, 2025, he was inducted into the 2025 class of Library Lions by the New York Public Library.

== Discography ==
Studio albums

- Greetings from Asbury Park, N.J. (1973)
- The Wild, the Innocent & the E Street Shuffle (1973)
- Born to Run (1975)
- Darkness on the Edge of Town (1978)
- The River (1980)
- Nebraska (1982)
- Born in the U.S.A. (1984)
- Tunnel of Love (1987)
- Human Touch (1992)
- Lucky Town (1992)
- The Ghost of Tom Joad (1995)
- The Rising (2002)
- Devils & Dust (2005)
- We Shall Overcome: The Seeger Sessions (2006)
- Magic (2007)
- Working on a Dream (2009)
- Wrecking Ball (2012)
- High Hopes (2014)
- Western Stars (2019)
- Letter to You (2020)
- Only the Strong Survive (2022)

== Concert tours ==
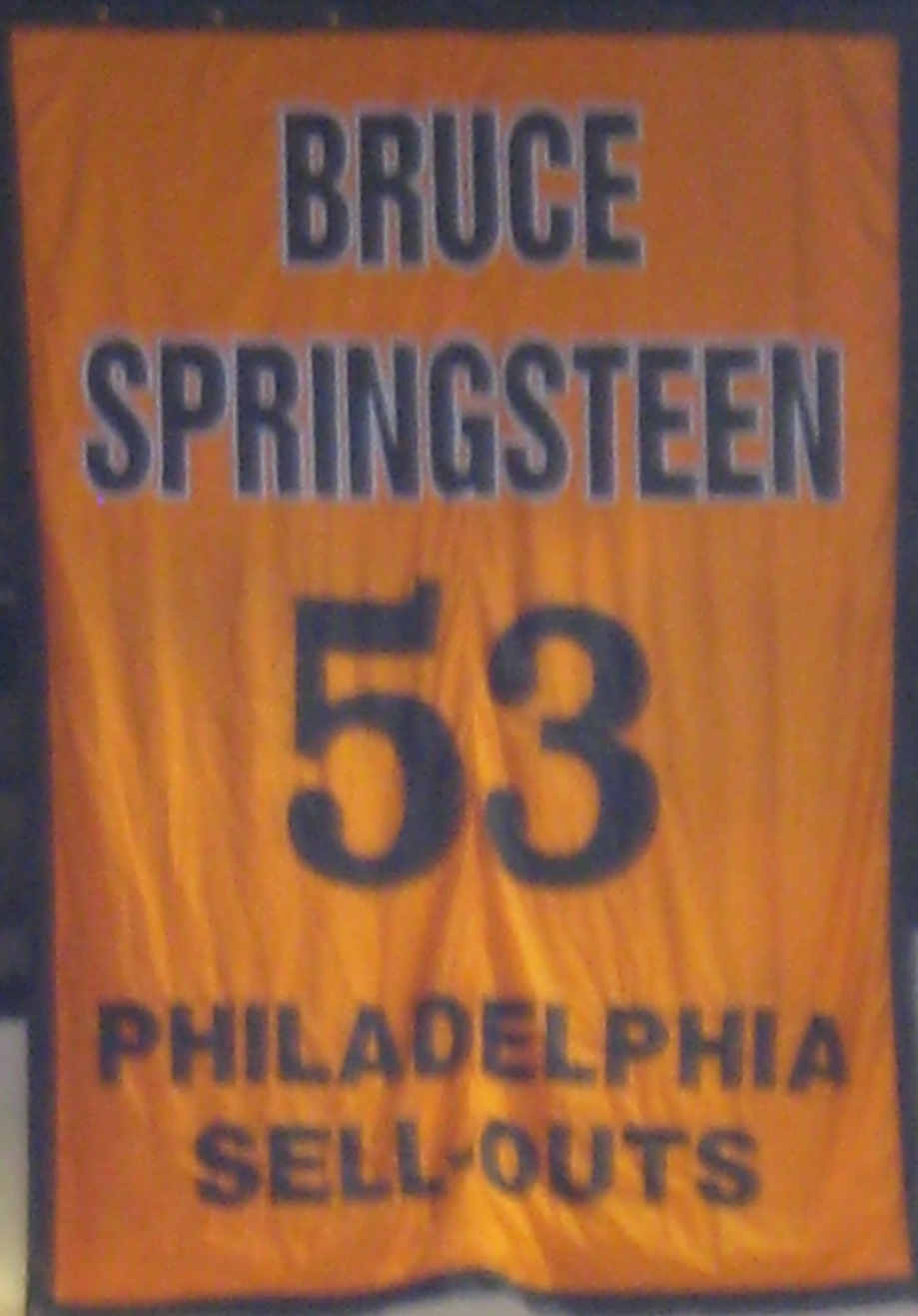
A banner hanging at Xfinity Mobile Arena in Philadelphia, recognizing Springsteen's 53 sellout concerts at the arena as of 2014; as of 2023, Springsteen has performed 67 sellout concerts at the Philadelphia venue.

=== Headlining tours ===
- Born to Run tours (1974–1977)
- Darkness Tour (1978–1979)
- The River Tour (1980–1981)
- Born in the U.S.A. Tour (1984–1985)
- Tunnel of Love Express Tour (1988)
- Bruce Springsteen 1992–1993 World Tour (1992–1993)
- Ghost of Tom Joad Tour (1995–1997)
- Bruce Springsteen and the E Street Band Reunion Tour (1999–2000)
- The Rising Tour (2002–2003)
- Devils & Dust Tour (2005)
- Bruce Springsteen with the Seeger Sessions Band Tour (2006)
- Magic Tour (2007–2008)
- Working on a Dream Tour (2009)
- Wrecking Ball World Tour (2012–2013)
- High Hopes Tour (2014)
- The River Tour (2016–2017)
- Springsteen and E Street Band 2023–2025 Tour (2023–2025)
- Land of Hope and Dreams American Tour (2026)

=== Residency ===
- Springsteen on Broadway (2017–2018; 2021)

=== Co-headlining tours ===
- Human Rights Now! (1988)
- Vote for Change (2004)

== See also ==
- List of American Grammy Award winners and nominees
- Forbes list of highest-earning musicians
- Honorific nicknames in popular music
- List of artists who reached number one on the U.S. Mainstream Rock chart
- List of highest-grossing live music artists
- List of music artists by net worth
- Music of New Jersey
