= Springsteen & I =

2013 film by Baillie Walsh

- Official poster featuring the images of over 350 fans
- Directed by: Baillie Walsh
- Produced by: Ridley Scott, Svana Gisla
- Starring: Bruce Springsteen, E Street Band
- Music by: Bruce Springsteen
- Production company: Black Dog Films
- Release date: July 22, 2013
- Running time: 77 minutes
- Country: United States
- Language: English

Springsteen & I is a 2013 documentary-biographical film directed by Baillie Walsh documenting the life and career of Bruce Springsteen through the eyes and insights of his fans throughout the world.

== Background ==
In November 2012 Walsh, along with producer Ridley Scott through the production companies Ridley Scott Associates, Black Dog Films and Scott Free Productions announced their plans for the making of the documentary, which Walsh said inspired by the award-winning film Life in a Day. Produced by Svana Gisla (https://www.imdb.com/title/tt2513616/?ref_=nm_flmg_prd_15)Walsh only used fan submitted video and photographs where fans provided their most personal insights, abstractions and reflections on how Springsteen and his music has affected their lives.

Walsh stated, "We are searching for a wide variety of creative interpretations, captured in the most visually exciting way you can think of, whether you've been a hardcore Tramp since '73 or have heard one of his songs for the first time today! If you have a parent, a sibling, a neighbor or a colleague who has an interesting tale, we want to know about them. If you can't use a camera or are not sure how to capture your story then get in touch and we will link you up with someone who can!"

The production team edited the footage to feature length and are requested that submissions be raw footage rather than edited material. As well as moving image accounts on camera, the filmmakers asked fans to provide photographs, old footage or audio narration to help them build up a picture of what the acclaimed songwriter and musician means to them. Movie and image files were able to be quickly uploaded through the film's website springsteenandi.com by following simple online instructions. Ideally, the higher quality the footage the better, but the producers stressed that any equipment, from smartphones to hi-def cameras are accepted – as long as they are all under 5 minutes in length. The documentary features unseen live performances and some of Springsteen's most loved songs. Submissions for the film were accepted from November 15, 2012 through November 29, 2012. Walsh then edited the footage together for the film's 2013 release.

Walsh said of the film that he went through over 300 hours of footage, watching everything that was sent to him. "I felt very much a responsibility to do so. Enormous effort went into [filming those submissions] from thousands of people. I was worried that we were going to get 4,000 hours, that would have been a real problem. Three hundred hours was manageable. Every day we saw something new. Every day was exciting.” Walsh said. Walsh spent six months editing the film and while there's certainly a lot of love for Bruce in the documentary, there were some things that he steered away from. "There were stories about how generous he is, stuff about 9/11, and he comes off a bit god-like, and I didn’t feel comfortable with those stories. I think this film doesn’t build Bruce to be a god. There’s an undercurrent that he’s a very decent man, and that does come across in the stories that are told. It’s just very heartfelt stories of people talking about how Bruce and his music has affected their lives. One guy from Israel says, ‘Bruce taught me how to be a man — a decent man.’ That's who Bruce is. I really tried not to make it heavy-handed. I didn't come to the film as a Bruce Springsteen fan. I'm leaving it as a great admirer. I think his career is astonishing. I think the fact that he's still producing relevant music — the fact that [in 2012 he released] Wrecking Ball at the age of 60, that's an amazing achievement." Walsh said that Springsteen saw the film and really enjoyed the humor in it. The people in the film were really eloquent. His management informed Walsh that Springsteen really enjoyed the film.

An interactive poster for the film was released on June 7, 2013 featuring the images of over 350 fans.

== Release ==
The film was released on July 22, 2013 simultaneously via a worldwide cinema broadcast in over 50 countries and in over 2000 movie theaters. A trailer was released on May 23, 2013. while an extended trailer was released in July 2013. Tickets for the film went on sale across the world on June 7, 2013 while tickets for the United States went on sale June 14, 2013.

Springsteen & I made its television debut October 25, 2013 on Showtime and was released on DVD and Blu-Ray on October 29, 2013.

== Bonus theatrical footage ==
Following the film's credits, fans who attended the theatrical release were treated to a special six-song, 45-minute live performance from Springsteen's set at the 2012 "Hard Rock Calling" festival which featured Paul McCartney. Following the live footage there was an epilogue featuring some of the film's more stand-out fans who were able to give an update on their lives and who were lucky enough to meet Springsteen backstage after one of his shows. The bonus footage was included in the DVD and Blu-ray release.

== Reception ==
Critical reviews for the film have been mostly positive.

Randy Lewis of the Los Angeles Times said "When fans describe the passion of his performances or the connection of his music and lyrics to episodes in their lives, it's clearly heartfelt, but not significantly different than what fans of Bon Jovi or Billy Joel or Justin Bieber might say about their favorite artists. If Springsteen and I doesn't conclusively answer the question of what distinguishes him from the thousands of others who have traveled the path of rock 'n' roll before and since he came along, it does give the faithful, and even the curious, a lot to bond over."

Austin O'Connor of AARP called the film "A love letter to The Boss" and that "Even the biggest Springsteen hater might be converted to one of the faithful. [...] It's a quirky little film, at turns charming and creepy but ultimately redeeming, about people who are extremely devoted to the 63-year-old rock star." O'Connor also discussed the film's flaws by saying "But there are missteps. Some of the glorified YouTube videos seem to straddle the line between fan and stalker. One woman who sits far too close to her webcam gushes so rapturously about Springsteen’s effects on her you wonder if a restraining order might be required. Another guy talking about Springsteen while driving his car suddenly breaks down in tears."
