= Baillie Walsh =

British film director

- Born: Baillie Walsh; 14 December 1959
- Occupation: Film director

Baillie Walsh is a British film director and screenwriter. He is best known for his work directing music videos and films for corporate brands.

== Career ==
Walsh made his feature-film debut with Flashbacks of a Fool, starring Daniel Craig and Felicity Jones, which he wrote and directed. He has also directed the documentaries Mirror Mirror, Lord Don't Slow Me Down, Springsteen & I, and Being James Bond, a documentary about Daniel Craig's tenure in the role.

Walsh has also created films and advertisements for corporate brands including Levis, Sony, Huawei, Citroën, Versace, Hugo Boss, Cartier, Yves Saint Laurent, and Thierry Mugler.

He has also directed music videos for artists such as Oasis, Kylie Minogue, New Order, INXS, and Spiritualized.

Other notable works include the hologram installation of Kate Moss for the designer Alexander McQueen, Massive Attack’s ‘Unfinished Sympathy’ video, and the 2018 charity video Malaria Must Die So Millions Can Live. Walsh also directed ABBA Voyage, a concert notable for its use of digital avatars of ABBA, combined with a band performing live.

== Filmography ==
- 1996: Mirror, Mirror
- 2001: Massive Attack: Eleven Promos
- 2004: I'm Only Looking: The Best of INXS
- 2007: Lord Don't Slow Me Down
- 2008: Flashbacks of a Fool
- 2013: Springsteen & I
- 2021: Being James Bond
