= List of songs recorded by Bruce Springsteen =

Songs by American singer-songwriter

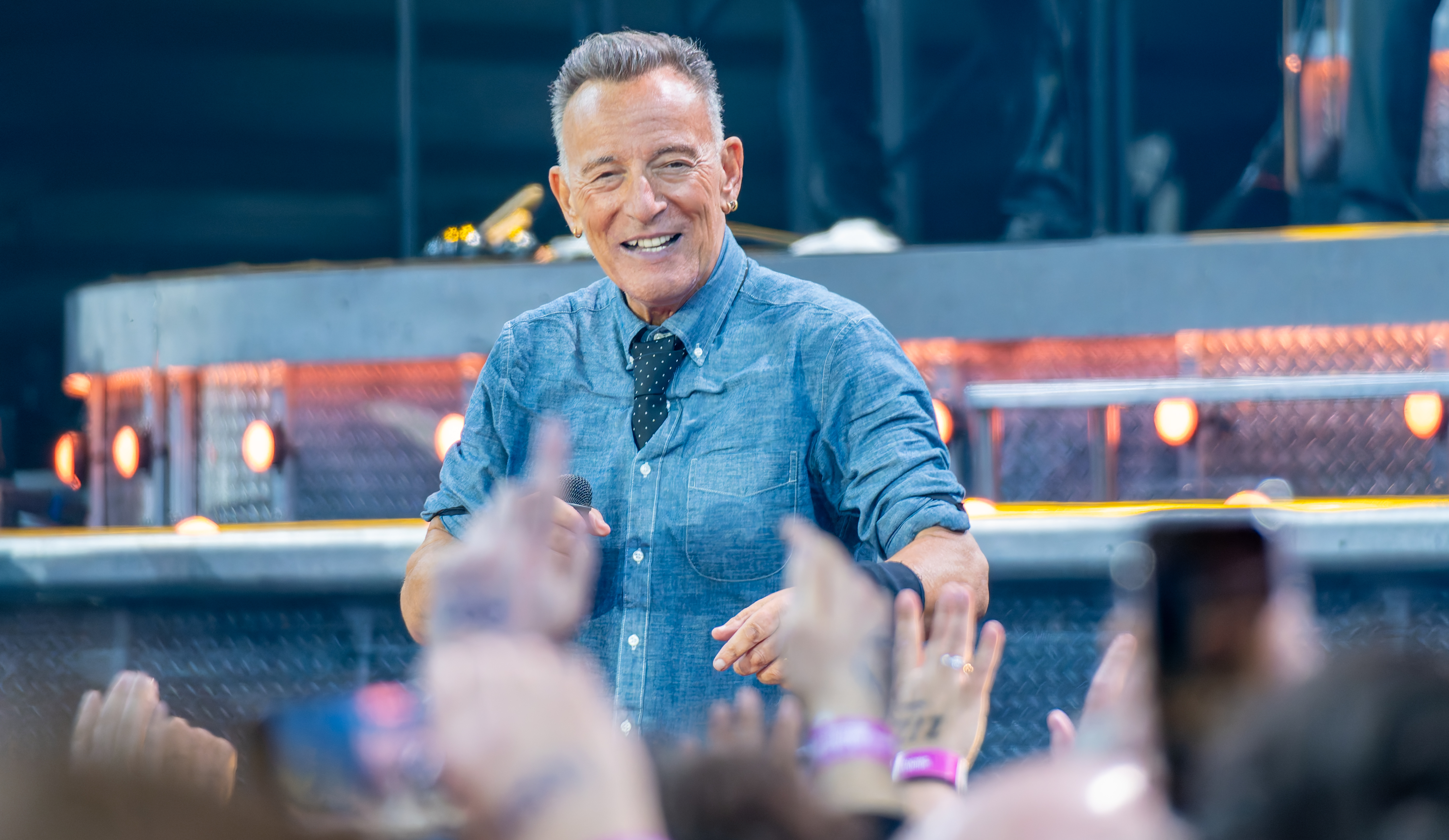
Bruce Springsteen performing in 2024

Bruce Springsteen is an American singer-songwriter who has recorded almost 400 songs over a career lasting six decades. He began his career in the 1960s with local New Jersey bands the Castiles, Earth, and Steel Mill before embarking on a solo career and signing to Columbia Records in 1972. (Note: Five recorded songs from Springsteen's time with these bands were released on the compilation album Chapter and Verse in 2016.) Since 1973, he has released songs across studio albums, live albums, extended plays, compilation albums, and box sets. His primary backing band is the E Street Band, who have played with him from his debut album to their break-up in the late-1980s, and more sporadically since their reformation in the late 1990s.

Springsteen is the primary songwriter for the majority of his songs, but he has also released cover material, such as live renditions of the Temptations' "War" (1986) and Bob Dylan's "Chimes of Freedom" (1988), which were chart hits, and the cover albums We Shall Overcome: The Seeger Sessions (2006) and Only the Strong Survive (2022). Several of his songs have also been chart hits for other artists, such as "Blinded by the Light" for Manfred Mann's Earth Band, "Because the Night" for Patti Smith, "Fire" for the Pointer Sisters, "This Little Girl" for Gary U.S. Bonds, and "Pink Cadillac" for Natalie Cole. Songs Springsteen has written for film soundtracks include "Streets of Philadelphia" (1993), and "Dead Man Walkin'" (1995), "Lift Me Up" (1999), and "Addicted to Romance" (2023).

== Released songs ==
Key
†	Indicates songs written or co-written by others and traditional songs
‡	Indicates live recording

Name of song, writer(s), original release, producer(s), and year of release
Song	Writer(s)	Original release	Producer(s)	Year	Ref.
"30 Days Out"	Bruce Springsteen	B-side of "Leap of Faith"	Jon Landau; Chuck Plotkin; Bruce Springsteen; Roy Bittan	1992	
"4th of July, Asbury Park (Sandy)"	Bruce Springsteen	The Wild, the Innocent & the E Street Shuffle	Mike Appel; Jim Cretecos	1973	
"57 Channels (And Nothin' On)"	Bruce Springsteen	Human Touch	Jon Landau; Chuck Plotkin; Bruce Springsteen; Roy Bittan	1992	
"7 Rooms of Gloom" (Four Tops cover)	Holland–Dozier–Holland †	Only the Strong Survive	Ron Aniello; Bruce Springsteen	2022	
"Across the Border"	Bruce Springsteen	The Ghost of Tom Joad	Chuck Plotkin; Bruce Springsteen	1995	
"Adam Raised a Cain"	Bruce Springsteen	Darkness on the Edge of Town	Jon Landau; Bruce Springsteen; Steven Van Zandt (assistant)	1978	
"Addicted to Romance"	Bruce Springsteen	She Came to Me (soundtrack)	Bryce Dessner	2023	
"Adelita"	Bruce Springsteen	Inyo (Tracks II: The Lost Albums)	Bruce Springsteen; Ron Aniello	2025	
"Ain't Good Enough for You"	Bruce Springsteen	The Promise	Jon Landau; Bruce Springsteen	2010	
"Ain't Got You"	Bruce Springsteen	Tunnel of Love	Jon Landau; Chuck Plotkin; Bruce Springsteen	1987	
"All God's Children"	Bruce Springsteen	Faithless (Tracks II: The Lost Albums)	Bruce Springsteen; Ron Aniello	2025	
"All I'm Thinkin' About"	Bruce Springsteen	Devils & Dust	Brendan O'Brien; Chuck Plotkin; Bruce Springsteen	2005	
"All or Nothin' at All"	Bruce Springsteen	Human Touch	Jon Landau; Chuck Plotkin; Bruce Springsteen; Roy Bittan	1992	
"All That Heaven Will Allow"	Bruce Springsteen	Tunnel of Love	Jon Landau; Chuck Plotkin; Bruce Springsteen	1987	
"All the Way Home"	Bruce Springsteen	Devils & Dust	Chuck Plotkin; Bruce Springsteen	2005	
"Always a Friend" (with Alejandro Escovedo)	Alejandro Escovedo; Chuck Prophet †	Magic Tour Highlights (EP)	John Cooper	2008	
"American Beauty"	Bruce Springsteen	American Beauty (EP)	Ron Aniello; Bruce Springsteen	2014	
"American Land"	Bruce Springsteen (Note: Inspired by "He Lies In the American Land" by Andrew Kovaly/Pete Seeger)	We Shall Overcome: The Seeger Sessions (American Land Edition)	Bruce Springsteen	2006	
"American Skin (41 Shots)" (Note: A new studio recording appears on High Hopes (2014).) ‡	Bruce Springsteen	Live in New York City	Chuck Plotkin; Bruce Springsteen	2001	
"The Angel"	Bruce Springsteen	Greetings from Asbury Park, N.J.	Mike Appel; Jim Cretecos	1973	
"Another Thin Line"	Bruce Springsteen; Joe Grushecky	Perfect World (Tracks II: The Lost Albums)	Bruce Springsteen; Ron Aniello	2025	
"Another You"	Bruce Springsteen	Twilight Hours (Tracks II: The Lost Albums)	Bruce Springsteen; Ron Aniello	2025	
"Any Other Way" (William Bell cover)	William Bell †	Only the Strong Survive	Ron Aniello; Bruce Springsteen	2022	
"Atlantic City"	Bruce Springsteen	Nebraska	Bruce Springsteen	1982	
"The Aztec Dance"	Bruce Springsteen	Inyo (Tracks II: The Lost Albums)	Bruce Springsteen; Ron Aniello	2025	
"Baby I" (The Castiles)	Bruce Springsteen; George Theiss	Chapter and Verse	Bruce Springsteen	2016	
"Backstreets"	Bruce Springsteen	Born to Run	Mike Appel; Jon Landau; Bruce Springsteen	1975	
"Back in Your Arms"	Bruce Springsteen	Tracks	Jon Landau; Chuck Plotkin; Bruce Springsteen; Roy Bittan	1998	
"Badlands"	Bruce Springsteen	Darkness on the Edge of Town	Jon Landau; Bruce Springsteen; Steven Van Zandt (assistant)	1978	
"Balboa Park"	Bruce Springsteen	The Ghost of Tom Joad	Chuck Plotkin; Bruce Springsteen	1995	
"The Ballad of Jesse James" (The Bruce Springsteen Band)	Bruce Springsteen	Chapter and Verse	Bruce Springsteen	2016	
"Be True"	Bruce Springsteen	B-side of "Fade Away"	Jon Landau; Bruce Springsteen; Steven Van Zandt	1981	
"Because the Night" (Note: A studio recording appears on The Promise (2010).) ‡ (Originally released by Patti Smith in 1978)	Bruce Springsteen; Patti Smith	Live 1975–85	Jon Landau; Chuck Plotkin; Bruce Springsteen	1986	
"Better Days"	Bruce Springsteen	Lucky Town	Jon Landau; Chuck Plotkin; Bruce Springsteen	1992	
"Between Heaven and Earth"	Bruce Springsteen	Streets of Philadelphia Sessions (Tracks II: The Lost Albums)	Bruce Springsteen; Chuck Plotkin; Jon Landau	2025	
"The Big Muddy"	Bruce Springsteen	Lucky Town	Jon Landau; Chuck Plotkin; Bruce Springsteen; Roy Bittan	1992	
"The Big Payback"	Bruce Springsteen	B-side of "Open All Night"	Bruce Springsteen	1982	
"Bishop Danced" ‡	Bruce Springsteen	Tracks	Bruce Springsteen	1998	
"Black Cowboys"	Bruce Springsteen	Devils & Dust	Brendan O'Brien; Chuck Plotkin; Bruce Springsteen	2005	
"Black Mountain Ballad"	Bruce Springsteen	L.A. Garage Sessions '83 (Tracks II: The Lost Albums)	Bruce Springsteen; Ron Aniello	2025	
"Blind Man"	Bruce Springsteen	Perfect World (Tracks II: The Lost Albums)	Bruce Springsteen; Ron Aniello	2025	
"Blind Spot"	Bruce Springsteen	Streets of Philadelphia Sessions (Tracks II: The Lost Albums)	Bruce Springsteen; Chuck Plotkin; Jon Landau	2025	
"Blinded by the Light"	Bruce Springsteen	Greetings from Asbury Park, N.J.	Mike Appel; Jim Cretecos	1973	
"Blood Brothers"	Bruce Springsteen	Greatest Hits	Jon Landau; Chuck Plotkin; Bruce Springsteen	1995	
"Blue Highway"	Bruce Springsteen	Somewhere North of Nashville (Tracks II: The Lost Albums)	Bruce Springsteen; Ron Aniello	2025	
"Bobby Jean"	Bruce Springsteen	Born in the U.S.A.	Jon Landau; Chuck Plotkin; Bruce Springsteen; Steven Van Zandt	1984	
"Book of Dreams"	Bruce Springsteen	Lucky Town	Jon Landau; Chuck Plotkin; Bruce Springsteen	1992	
"Born in the U.S.A."	Bruce Springsteen	Born in the U.S.A.	Jon Landau; Chuck Plotkin; Bruce Springsteen; Steven Van Zandt	1984	
"Born to Run"	Bruce Springsteen	Born to Run	Mike Appel; Bruce Springsteen	1975	
"Breakaway"	Bruce Springsteen	The Promise	Jon Landau; Bruce Springsteen	2010	
"Brilliant Disguise"	Bruce Springsteen	Tunnel of Love	Jon Landau; Chuck Plotkin; Bruce Springsteen	1987	
"Bring 'Em Home"	Pete Seeger (Note: Includes a new verse by Jim Musselman & elements from "When Johnny Comes Marching Home") †	We Shall Overcome: The Seeger Sessions (American Land Edition)	Bruce Springsteen	2006	
"Bring On the Night"	Bruce Springsteen	Tracks	Jon Landau; Bruce Springsteen	1998	
"The Brokenhearted"	Bruce Springsteen	The Promise	Jon Landau; Bruce Springsteen	2010	
"Brothers Under the Bridges ('83)"	Bruce Springsteen	Tracks	Jon Landau; Chuck Plotkin; Bruce Springsteen; Steven Van Zandt	1998	
"Brothers Under the Bridge ('95)"	Bruce Springsteen	Tracks	Chuck Plotkin; Bruce Springsteen	1998	
"Buffalo Gals"	Traditional †	We Shall Overcome: The Seeger Sessions (DualDisc bonus disc)	Bruce Springsteen	2006	
"Burnin' Train"	Bruce Springsteen	Letter to You	Ron Aniello; Bruce Springsteen	2020	
"Cadillac Ranch"	Bruce Springsteen	The River	Jon Landau; Bruce Springsteen; Steven Van Zandt	1980	
"Candy's Room" (Note: An early version titled "Candy's Boy" appears on The Promise (2010).)	Bruce Springsteen	Darkness on the Edge of Town	Jon Landau; Bruce Springsteen; Steven Van Zandt (assistant)	1978	
"Car Wash"	Bruce Springsteen	Tracks	Jon Landau; Chuck Plotkin; Bruce Springsteen; Steven Van Zandt	1998	
"Cautious Man"	Bruce Springsteen	Tunnel of Love	Jon Landau; Chuck Plotkin; Bruce Springsteen	1987	
"Chain Lightning"	Bruce Springsteen	The Ties That Bind: The River Collection	Jon Landau; Bruce Springsteen; Steven Van Zandt	2015	
"Chasin' Wild Horses"	Bruce Springsteen	Western Stars	Ron Aniello; Bruce Springsteen	2019	
"Child Bride"	Bruce Springsteen	Nebraska '82 (Expanded Edition)	Mike Batlan (engineer)	2025	
"Chimes of Freedom" ‡ (Bob Dylan cover)	Bob Dylan †	Chimes of Freedom (EP)	Jon Landau; Chuck Plotkin; Bruce Springsteen	1988	
"Chinatown" (Bleachers featuring Bruce Springsteen)	Jack Antonoff; Evan Smith †	Take the Sadness Out of Saturday Night	Jack Antonoff; Patrik Berger	2020	
"Cindy"	Bruce Springsteen	The Ties That Bind: The River Collection	Jon Landau; Bruce Springsteen; Steven Van Zandt	2015	
"City of Night"	Bruce Springsteen	The Promise	Jon Landau; Bruce Springsteen	2010	
"Ciudad Juarez"	Bruce Springsteen	Inyo (Tracks II: The Lost Albums)	Bruce Springsteen; Ron Aniello	2025	
"Code of Silence" ‡	Bruce Springsteen	The Essential Bruce Springsteen (Limited Edition bonus disc)	Chuck Plotkin	2003	
"Come On (Let's Go Tonight)"	Bruce Springsteen	The Promise	Jon Landau; Bruce Springsteen	2010	
"Countin' on a Miracle"	Bruce Springsteen	The Rising	Brendan O'Brien	2002	
"County Fair" (Note: Also included on L.A. Garage Sessions '83, as part of Tracks II: The Lost Albums (2025))	Bruce Springsteen	The Essential Bruce Springsteen (Limited Edition bonus disc)	Jon Landau; Chuck Plotkin; Bruce Springsteen	2003	
"Cover Me"	Bruce Springsteen	Born in the U.S.A.	Jon Landau; Chuck Plotkin; Bruce Springsteen; Steven Van Zandt	1984	
"Cross My Heart"	Bruce Springsteen; Sonny Boy Williamson (lyrics)	Human Touch	Jon Landau; Chuck Plotkin; Bruce Springsteen; Roy Bittan	1992	
"Crush on You"	Bruce Springsteen	The River	Jon Landau; Bruce Springsteen; Steven Van Zandt	1980	
"Cutting Knife"	Bruce Springsteen	Perfect World (Tracks II: The Lost Albums)	Bruce Springsteen; Ron Aniello	2025	
"Cynthia"	Bruce Springsteen	Tracks	Jon Landau; Chuck Plotkin; Bruce Springsteen; Steven Van Zandt	1998	
"Dancing in the Dark"	Bruce Springsteen	Born in the U.S.A.	Jon Landau; Chuck Plotkin; Bruce Springsteen; Steven Van Zandt	1984	
"Darkness on the Edge of Town"	Bruce Springsteen	Darkness on the Edge of Town	Jon Landau; Bruce Springsteen; Steven Van Zandt (assistant)	1978	
"Darlington County"	Bruce Springsteen	Born in the U.S.A.	Jon Landau; Chuck Plotkin; Bruce Springsteen; Steven Van Zandt	1984	
"Dead Man Walkin'"	Bruce Springsteen	Dead Man Walking (soundtrack)	Chuck Plotkin; Bruce Springsteen	1996	
"Death to My Hometown"	Bruce Springsteen	Wrecking Ball	Ron Aniello; Bruce Springsteen	2012	
"Delivery Man"	Bruce Springsteen	Somewhere North of Nashville (Tracks II: The Lost Albums)	Bruce Springsteen; Ron Aniello	2025	
"The Desert" (instrumental)	Bruce Springsteen	Faithless (Tracks II: The Lost Albums)	Bruce Springsteen; Ron Aniello	2025	
"Detail Man"	Bruce Springsteen	Somewhere North of Nashville (Tracks II: The Lost Albums)	Bruce Springsteen; Ron Aniello	2025	
"Detroit Medley": "Devil with the Blue Dress" / "Good Golly, Miss Molly" / "Jenny Take a Ride" (Note: A recording from the same shows featuring "C.C. Rider" was included on The Legendary 1979 No Nukes Concerts (2021).) ‡ (Bruce Springsteen & the E Street Band)	Various (Note: "Devil with the Blue Dress": Shorty Long / Mickey Stevenson; "Good Golly, Miss Molly": Robert Blackwell / John Marascalco; "Jenny Take a Ride": Enotris Johnson / Richard Penniman / Bob Crewe) †	No Nukes: The Muse Concerts for a Non-Nuclear Future	Jackson Browne; Graham Nash; John Hall; Bonnie Raitt	1979	
"Devils & Dust"	Bruce Springsteen	Devils & Dust	Brendan O'Brien; Chuck Plotkin; Bruce Springsteen	2005	
"Devil's Arcade"	Bruce Springsteen	Magic	Brendan O'Brien	2007	
"Dinner at Eight"	Bruce Springsteen	Twilight Hours (Tracks II: The Lost Albums)	Bruce Springsteen; Ron Aniello	2025	
"Do I Love You (Indeed I Do)" (Frank Wilson cover)	Frank Wilson †	Only the Strong Survive	Ron Aniello; Bruce Springsteen	2022	
"Does This Bus Stop at 82nd Street?"	Bruce Springsteen	Greetings from Asbury Park, N.J.	Mike Appel; Jim Cretecos	1973	
"Dollhouse"	Bruce Springsteen	Tracks	Jon Landau; Bruce Springsteen; Steven Van Zandt	1998	
"Don't Back Down"	Bruce Springsteen	L.A. Garage Sessions '83 (Tracks II: The Lost Albums)	Bruce Springsteen; Ron Aniello	2025	
"Don't Back Down on Our Love"	Bruce Springsteen	L.A. Garage Sessions '83 (Tracks II: The Lost Albums)	Bruce Springsteen; Ron Aniello	2025	
"Don't Look Back"	Bruce Springsteen	Tracks	Jon Landau; Bruce Springsteen	1998	
"Don't Play That Song" (Ben E. King cover)	Ahmet Ertegun; Betty Nelson †	Only the Strong Survive	Ron Aniello; Bruce Springsteen	2022	
"Down in the Hole"	Bruce Springsteen	High Hopes	Brendan O'Brien	2014	
"Downbound Train"	Bruce Springsteen	Born in the U.S.A.	Jon Landau; Chuck Plotkin; Bruce Springsteen; Steven Van Zandt	1984	
"Dream Baby Dream" (Suicide cover)	Martin Rev; Alan Vega †	High Hopes	Ron Aniello; Bruce Springsteen	2014	
"Drive All Night"	Bruce Springsteen	The River	Jon Landau; Bruce Springsteen; Steven Van Zandt	1980	
"Drive Fast (The Stuntman)"	Bruce Springsteen	Western Stars	Ron Aniello; Bruce Springsteen	2019	
"Dry Lightning"	Bruce Springsteen	The Ghost of Tom Joad	Chuck Plotkin; Bruce Springsteen	1995	
"Dustland" (The Killers featuring Bruce Springsteen)	Brandon Flowers; Dave Keuning; Mark Stoermer; Ronnie Vannucci, Jr. †	Non-album single	–	2021	
"The E Street Shuffle"	Bruce Springsteen	The Wild, the Innocent & the E Street Shuffle	Mike Appel; Jim Cretecos	1973	
"Easy Money"	Bruce Springsteen	Wrecking Ball	Ron Aniello; Bruce Springsteen	2012	
"El Jardinero (Upon the Death of Ramona)"	Bruce Springsteen	Inyo (Tracks II: The Lost Albums)	Bruce Springsteen; Ron Aniello	2025	
"Empty Sky"	Bruce Springsteen	The Rising	Brendan O'Brien	2002	
"Erie Canal"	Thomas S. Allen †	We Shall Overcome: The Seeger Sessions	Bruce Springsteen	2006	
"Eyes on the Prize"	Traditional; (additional lyrics by Alice Wine) †	We Shall Overcome: The Seeger Sessions	Bruce Springsteen	2006	
"Factory"	Bruce Springsteen	Darkness on the Edge of Town	Jon Landau; Bruce Springsteen; Steven Van Zandt (assistant)	1978	
"Fade Away"	Bruce Springsteen	The River	Jon Landau; Bruce Springsteen; Steven Van Zandt	1980	
"Faithless"	Bruce Springsteen	Faithless (Tracks II: The Lost Albums)	Bruce Springsteen; Ron Aniello	2025	
"Farewell Party"	Bruce Springsteen	Streets of Philadelphia Sessions (Tracks II: The Lost Albums)	Bruce Springsteen; Chuck Plotkin; Jon Landau	2025	
"The Fever"	Bruce Springsteen	18 Tracks	Mike Appel; Jim Cretecos	1999	
"Fire" ‡	Bruce Springsteen	Live 1975–85	Jon Landau; Chuck Plotkin; Bruce Springsteen	1986	
"Follow That Dream"	Fred Wise; Ben Weisman †	L.A. Garage Sessions '83 (Tracks II: The Lost Albums)	Bruce Springsteen; Ron Aniello	2025	
"Follow the Sun"	Bruce Springsteen	Twilight Hours (Tracks II: The Lost Albums)	Bruce Springsteen; Ron Aniello	2025	
"For You"	Bruce Springsteen	Greetings from Asbury Park, N.J.	Mike Appel; Jim Cretecos	1973	
"Frankie"	Bruce Springsteen	Tracks	Jon Landau; Chuck Plotkin; Bruce Springsteen; Steven Van Zandt	1998	
"Frankie Fell in Love"	Bruce Springsteen	High Hopes	Ron Aniello; Bruce Springsteen	2014	
"Froggie Went A-Courtin'"	Traditional †	We Shall Overcome: The Seeger Sessions	Bruce Springsteen	2006	
"From Small Things (Big Things One Day Come)" (Originally released by Dave Edmunds in 1982)	Bruce Springsteen	The Essential Bruce Springsteen (Limited Edition bonus disc)	Jon Landau; Bruce Springsteen; Steven Van Zandt	2003	
"Fugitive's Dream"	Bruce Springsteen	L.A. Garage Sessions '83 (Tracks II: The Lost Albums)	Bruce Springsteen; Ron Aniello	2025	
"Fugitive's Dream (Ballad)"	Bruce Springsteen	L.A. Garage Sessions '83 (Tracks II: The Lost Albums)	Bruce Springsteen; Ron Aniello	2025	
"Further On (Up the Road)"	Bruce Springsteen	The Rising	Brendan O'Brien	2002	
"The Fuse"	Bruce Springsteen	The Rising	Brendan O'Brien	2002	
"Galveston Bay"	Bruce Springsteen	The Ghost of Tom Joad	Chuck Plotkin; Bruce Springsteen	1995	
"Gave It a Name"	Bruce Springsteen	Tracks	Chuck Plotkin; Bruce Springsteen	1998	
"The Ghost of Tom Joad"	Bruce Springsteen	The Ghost of Tom Joad	Chuck Plotkin; Bruce Springsteen	1995	
"Ghosts"	Bruce Springsteen	Letter to You	Ron Aniello; Bruce Springsteen	2020	
"Girls in Their Summer Clothes"	Bruce Springsteen	Magic	Brendan O'Brien	2007	
"Give the Girl a Kiss"	Bruce Springsteen	Tracks	Jon Landau; Bruce Springsteen	1998	
"Gloria's Eyes"	Bruce Springsteen	Human Touch	Jon Landau; Chuck Plotkin; Bruce Springsteen; Roy Bittan	1992	
"Glory Days"	Bruce Springsteen	Born in the U.S.A.	Jon Landau; Chuck Plotkin; Bruce Springsteen; Steven Van Zandt	1984	
"God Sent You"	Bruce Springsteen	Faithless (Tracks II: The Lost Albums)	Bruce Springsteen; Ron Aniello	2025	
"Goin' Cali"	Bruce Springsteen	Tracks	Jon Landau; Chuck Plotkin; Bruce Springsteen; Roy Bittan	1998	
"Goin' to California"	Bruce Springsteen	Faithless (Tracks II: The Lost Albums)	Bruce Springsteen; Ron Aniello	2025	
"Good Eye"	Bruce Springsteen	Working on a Dream	Brendan O'Brien	2009	
"A Good Man Is Hard to Find (Pittsburgh)"	Bruce Springsteen	Tracks	Jon Landau; Chuck Plotkin; Bruce Springsteen; Steven Van Zandt	1998	
"Gotta Get That Feeling"	Bruce Springsteen	The Promise	Jon Landau; Bruce Springsteen	2010	
"The Great Depression"	Bruce Springsteen	Perfect World (Tracks II: The Lost Albums)	Bruce Springsteen; Ron Aniello	2025	
"Growin' Up"	Bruce Springsteen	Greetings from Asbury Park, N.J.	Mike Appel; Jim Cretecos	1973	
"Gun In Every Home"	Bruce Springsteen	Nebraska '82 (Expanded Edition)	Toby Scott; Jeff Henrickson (engineers)	2025	
"Gypsy Biker"	Bruce Springsteen	Magic	Brendan O'Brien	2007	
"Happy"	Bruce Springsteen	Tracks	Jon Landau; Chuck Plotkin; Bruce Springsteen; Roy Bittan	1998	
"Harry's Place"	Bruce Springsteen	High Hopes	Brendan O'Brien	2014	
"He's Guilty (The Judge Song)" (Steel Mill)	Bruce Springsteen	Chapter and Verse	Bruce Springsteen	2016	
"Hearts of Stone"	Bruce Springsteen	Tracks	Jon Landau; Bruce Springsteen	1998	
"Heaven's Wall"	Bruce Springsteen	High Hopes	Ron Aniello; Brendan O'Brien; Bruce Springsteen	2014	
"Held Up Without a Gun"	Bruce Springsteen	B-side of "Hungry Heart"	Jon Landau; Bruce Springsteen; Steven Van Zandt	1980	
"Hello Sunshine"	Bruce Springsteen	Western Stars	Ron Aniello; Bruce Springsteen	2019	
"Henry Boy"	Bruce Springsteen	Chapter and Verse	Bruce Springsteen	2016	
"Hey Blue Eyes"	Bruce Springsteen	American Beauty (EP)	Brendan O'Brien	2014	
"Hey, Western Union Man" (Jerry Butler cover)	Jerry Butler; Kenny Gamble; Leon Huff †	Only the Strong Survive	Ron Aniello; Bruce Springsteen	2022	
"High Hopes" (Tim Scott McConnell cover)	Tim Scott McConnell †	Blood Brothers (EP)	Jon Landau; Chuck Plotkin; Bruce Springsteen	1996	
"High Sierra"	Bruce Springsteen	Twilight Hours (Tracks II: The Lost Albums)	Bruce Springsteen; Ron Aniello	2025	
"Highway 29"	Bruce Springsteen	The Ghost of Tom Joad	Chuck Plotkin; Bruce Springsteen	1995	
"Highway Patrolman"	Bruce Springsteen	Nebraska	Bruce Springsteen	1982	
"Hitch Hikin'"	Bruce Springsteen	Western Stars	Ron Aniello; Bruce Springsteen	2019	
"The Hitter"	Bruce Springsteen	Devils & Dust	Brendan O'Brien; Chuck Plotkin; Bruce Springsteen	2005	
"The Honeymooners"	Bruce Springsteen	Tracks	Jon Landau; Chuck Plotkin; Bruce Springsteen; Steven Van Zandt	1998	
"House of a Thousand Guitars"	Bruce Springsteen	Letter to You	Ron Aniello; Bruce Springsteen	2020	
"How Can a Poor Man Stand Such Times and Live?"	Blind Alfred Reed (additional lyrics by Bruce Springsteen) †	We Shall Overcome: The Seeger Sessions (American Land Edition)	Bruce Springsteen	2006	
"How Can I Keep from Singing?"	Attr. Robert Wadsworth Lowry (additional lyrics and music adapted by Doris Plenn) †	We Shall Overcome: The Seeger Sessions (DualDisc bonus disc)	Bruce Springsteen	2006	
"Human Touch"	Bruce Springsteen	Human Touch	Jon Landau; Chuck Plotkin; Bruce Springsteen; Roy Bittan	1992	
"Hungry Heart"	Bruce Springsteen	The River	Jon Landau; Bruce Springsteen; Steven Van Zandt	1980	
"Hunter of Invisible Game"	Bruce Springsteen	High Hopes	Brendan O'Brien	2014	
"Hurry Up Sundown"	Bruce Springsteen	American Beauty (EP)	Ron Aniello; Bruce Springsteen	2014	
"I Forgot to Be Your Lover" (featuring Sam Moore) (William Bell cover)	William Bell; Booker T. Jones †	Only the Strong Survive	Ron Aniello; Bruce Springsteen	2022	
"I Wanna Be with You"	Bruce Springsteen	Tracks	Jon Landau; Bruce Springsteen; Steven Van Zandt	1998	
"I Wanna Marry You"	Bruce Springsteen	The River	Jon Landau; Bruce Springsteen; Steven Van Zandt	1980	
"I Wish I Were Blind"	Bruce Springsteen	Human Touch	Jon Landau; Chuck Plotkin; Bruce Springsteen; Roy Bittan	1992	
"I Wish It Would Rain" (The Temptations cover)	Norman Whitfield; Barrett Strong; Rodger Penzabene †	Only the Strong Survive	Ron Aniello; Bruce Springsteen	2022	
"I'll See You in My Dreams"	Bruce Springsteen	Letter to You	Ron Aniello; Bruce Springsteen	2020	
"I'll Stand by You"	Bruce Springsteen	Twilight Hours (Tracks II: The Lost Albums)	Bruce Springsteen; Ron Aniello	2025	
"I'll Work for Your Love"	Bruce Springsteen	Magic	Brendan O'Brien	2007	
"I'm a Rocker"	Bruce Springsteen	The River	Jon Landau; Bruce Springsteen; Steven Van Zandt	1980	
"I'm Goin' Down"	Bruce Springsteen	Born in the U.S.A.	Jon Landau; Chuck Plotkin; Bruce Springsteen; Steven Van Zandt	1984	
"I'm Not Sleeping"	Bruce Springsteen; Joe Grushecky	Perfect World (Tracks II: The Lost Albums)	Bruce Springsteen; Ron Aniello	2025	
"I'm on Fire"	Bruce Springsteen	Born in the U.S.A.	Jon Landau; Chuck Plotkin; Bruce Springsteen; Steven Van Zandt	1984	
"Iceman"	Bruce Springsteen	Tracks	Jon Landau; Bruce Springsteen	1998	
"Idiot's Delight"	Bruce Springsteen; Joe Grushecky	Perfect World (Tracks II: The Lost Albums)	Bruce Springsteen; Ron Aniello	2025	
"If I Should Fall Behind"	Bruce Springsteen	Lucky Town	Jon Landau; Chuck Plotkin; Bruce Springsteen	1992	
"If I Was the Priest"	Bruce Springsteen	Letter to You	Ron Aniello; Bruce Springsteen	2020	
"If I Could Only Be Your Lover"	Bruce Springsteen	Perfect World (Tracks II: The Lost Albums)	Bruce Springsteen; Ron Aniello	2025	
"Incident on 57th Street"	Bruce Springsteen	The Wild, the Innocent & the E Street Shuffle	Mike Appel; Jim Cretecos	1973	
"Independence Day"	Bruce Springsteen	The River	Jon Landau; Bruce Springsteen; Steven Van Zandt	1980	
"Indian Town"	Bruce Springsteen	Inyo (Tracks II: The Lost Albums)	Bruce Springsteen; Ron Aniello	2025	
"Into the Fire"	Bruce Springsteen	The Rising	Brendan O'Brien	2002	
"Inyo"	Bruce Springsteen	Inyo (Tracks II: The Lost Albums)	Bruce Springsteen; Ron Aniello	2025	
"It's a Shame"	Bruce Springsteen	The Promise	Jon Landau; Bruce Springsteen	2010	
"It's Hard to Be a Saint in the City"	Bruce Springsteen	Greetings from Asbury Park, N.J.	Mike Appel; Jim Cretecos	1973	
"Jack of All Trades"	Bruce Springsteen	Wrecking Ball	Ron Aniello; Bruce Springsteen	2012	
"Jackson Cage"	Bruce Springsteen	The River	Jon Landau; Bruce Springsteen; Steven Van Zandt	1980	
"Jacob's Ladder"	Traditional †	We Shall Overcome: The Seeger Sessions	Bruce Springsteen	2006	
"Janey, Don't You Lose Heart" (Note: A re-recording appears on Somewhere North of Nashville, as part of Tracks II: The Lost Albums (2025))	Bruce Springsteen	B-side of "I'm Goin' Down"	Jon Landau; Chuck Plotkin; Bruce Springsteen; Steven Van Zandt	1985	
"Janey Needs a Shooter"	Bruce Springsteen	Letter to You	Ron Aniello; Bruce Springsteen	2020	
"Jersey Girl" (Tom Waits cover) ‡	Tom Waits †	B-side of "Cover Me"	Jon Landau; Chuck Plotkin; Bruce Springsteen	1984	
"Jesse James"	Traditional †	We Shall Overcome: The Seeger Sessions	Bruce Springsteen	2006	
"Jesus Was an Only Son"	Bruce Springsteen	Devils & Dust	Brendan O'Brien; Chuck Plotkin; Bruce Springsteen	2005	
"Jim Deer"	Bruce Springsteen	L.A. Garage Sessions '83 (Tracks II: The Lost Albums)	Bruce Springsteen; Ron Aniello	2025	
"Johnny 99"	Bruce Springsteen	Nebraska	Bruce Springsteen	1982	
"Johnny Bye-Bye" (Note: Also included on L.A. Garage Sessions '83, as part of Tracks II: The Lost Albums (2025))	Bruce Springsteen; Chuck Berry	B-side of "I'm on Fire"	Jon Landau; Chuck Plotkin; Bruce Springsteen	1985	
"John Henry"	Traditional †	We Shall Overcome: The Seeger Sessions	Bruce Springsteen	2006	
"Jungleland"	Bruce Springsteen	Born to Run	Mike Appel; Jon Landau; Bruce Springsteen	1975	
"Just Like Fire Would" (The Saints cover)	Chris Bailey †	High Hopes	Ron Aniello; Bruce Springsteen	2014	
"Kingdom of Days"	Bruce Springsteen	Working on a Dream	Brendan O'Brien	2009	
"Kitty's Back"	Bruce Springsteen	The Wild, the Innocent & the E Street Shuffle	Mike Appel; Jim Cretecos	1973	
"The Klansman"	Bruce Springsteen	L.A. Garage Sessions '83 (Tracks II: The Lost Albums)	Bruce Springsteen; Ron Aniello	2025	
"Land of Hope and Dreams" (Note: A new studio recording appears on Wrecking Ball (2012).) ‡	Bruce Springsteen	Live in New York City	Chuck Plotkin; Bruce Springsteen	2001	
"The Last Carnival"	Bruce Springsteen	Working on a Dream	Brendan O'Brien	2009	
"Last Man Standing"	Bruce Springsteen	Letter to You	Ron Aniello; Bruce Springsteen	2020	
"Last to Die"	Bruce Springsteen	Magic	Brendan O'Brien	2007	
"Late in the Evening"	Bruce Springsteen	Twilight Hours (Tracks II: The Lost Albums)	Bruce Springsteen; Ron Aniello	2025	
"Leah"	Bruce Springsteen	Devils & Dust	Brendan O'Brien; Chuck Plotkin; Bruce Springsteen	2005	
"Leap of Faith"	Bruce Springsteen	Lucky Town	Jon Landau; Chuck Plotkin; Bruce Springsteen; Roy Bittan	1992	
"Leavin' Train"	Bruce Springsteen	Tracks	Jon Landau; Chuck Plotkin; Bruce Springsteen; Steven Van Zandt; Roy Bittan	1998	
"Let Me Ride"	Bruce Springsteen	Faithless (Tracks II: The Lost Albums)	Bruce Springsteen; Ron Aniello	2025	
"Let's Be Friends (Skin to Skin)"	Bruce Springsteen	The Rising	Brendan O'Brien	2002	
"Letter to You"	Bruce Springsteen	Letter to You	Ron Aniello; Bruce Springsteen	2020	
"Life Itself"	Bruce Springsteen	Working on a Dream	Brendan O'Brien	2009	
"Lift Me Up"	Bruce Springsteen	Limbo (soundtrack)	Bruce Springsteen	1999	
"Light of Day" ‡	Bruce Springsteen	In Concert/MTV Plugged	Jon Landau; Bruce Springsteen	1993	
"Linda Let Me Be the One"	Bruce Springsteen	Tracks	Jon Landau; Bruce Springsteen	1998	
"The Line"	Bruce Springsteen	The Ghost of Tom Joad	Chuck Plotkin; Bruce Springsteen	1995	
"Lion's Den"	Bruce Springsteen	Tracks	Jon Landau; Chuck Plotkin; Bruce Springsteen; Steven Van Zandt	1998	
"Little Girl Like You"	Bruce Springsteen	L.A. Garage Sessions '83 (Tracks II: The Lost Albums)	Bruce Springsteen; Ron Aniello	2025	
"The Little Things"	Bruce Springsteen	Streets of Philadelphia Sessions (Tracks II: The Lost Albums)	Bruce Springsteen; Chuck Plotkin; Jon Landau	2025	
"The Little Things (My Baby Does)"	Bruce Springsteen	The Promise	Jon Landau; Bruce Springsteen	2010	
"Little White Lies"	Bruce Springsteen	The Ties That Bind: The River Collection	Jon Landau; Bruce Springsteen; Steven Van Zandt	2015	
"Livin' in the Future"	Bruce Springsteen	Magic	Brendan O'Brien	2007	
"Living on the Edge of the World"	Bruce Springsteen	Tracks	Jon Landau; Bruce Springsteen; Steven Van Zandt	1998	
"Living Proof"	Bruce Springsteen	Lucky Town	Jon Landau; Chuck Plotkin; Bruce Springsteen; Roy Bittan	1992	
"Local Hero"	Bruce Springsteen	Lucky Town	Jon Landau; Chuck Plotkin; Bruce Springsteen	1992	
"Lonely Town"	Bruce Springsteen	Twilight Hours (Tracks II: The Lost Albums)	Bruce Springsteen; Ron Aniello	2025	
"Lonesome Day"	Bruce Springsteen	The Rising	Brendan O'Brien	2002	
"The Long Goodbye"	Bruce Springsteen	Human Touch	Jon Landau; Chuck Plotkin; Bruce Springsteen; Roy Bittan	1992	
"Long Time Comin'"	Bruce Springsteen	Devils & Dust	Chuck Plotkin; Bruce Springsteen	2005	
"Long Walk Home"	Bruce Springsteen	Magic	Brendan O'Brien	2007	
"Lonely Night in the Park"	Bruce Springsteen	Non-album single	Mike Appel; Jon Landau; Bruce Springsteen	2025	
"Loose Change"	Bruce Springsteen	Tracks	Jon Landau; Chuck Plotkin; Bruce Springsteen; Roy Bittan	1998	
"Loose Ends"	Bruce Springsteen	Tracks	Jon Landau; Bruce Springsteen; Steven Van Zandt	1998	
"Losin' Kind"	Bruce Springsteen	Nebraska '82 (Expanded Edition)	Toby Scott; Jeff Henrickson (engineers)	2025	
"The Lost Charro"	Bruce Springsteen	Inyo (Tracks II: The Lost Albums)	Bruce Springsteen; Ron Aniello	2025	
"Lost in the Flood"	Bruce Springsteen	Greetings from Asbury Park, N.J.	Mike Appel; Jim Cretecos	1973	
"Lucky Man"	Bruce Springsteen	B-side of "Brilliant Disguise"	Jon Landau; Chuck Plotkin; Bruce Springsteen	1987	
"Lucky Town"	Bruce Springsteen	Lucky Town	Jon Landau; Chuck Plotkin; Bruce Springsteen	1992	
"Magic"	Bruce Springsteen	Magic	Brendan O'Brien	2007	
"Man at the Top"	Bruce Springsteen	"Sad Eyes" CD single	Jon Landau; Chuck Plotkin; Bruce Springsteen; Steven Van Zandt	1999	
"The Man Who Got Away"	Bruce Springsteen	The Ties That Bind: The River Collection	Jon Landau; Bruce Springsteen; Steven Van Zandt	2015	
"Man's Job"	Bruce Springsteen	Human Touch	Jon Landau; Chuck Plotkin; Bruce Springsteen; Roy Bittan	1992	
"Mansion on the Hill"	Bruce Springsteen	Nebraska	Bruce Springsteen	1982	
"Maria's Bed"	Bruce Springsteen	Devils & Dust	Brendan O'Brien; Chuck Plotkin; Bruce Springsteen	2005	
"Mary Lou"	Bruce Springsteen	Tracks	Jon Landau; Bruce Springsteen; Steven Van Zandt	1998	
"Mary Mary"	Bruce Springsteen	American Beauty (EP)	Ron Aniello; Bruce Springsteen	2014	
"Mary Queen of Arkansas"	Bruce Springsteen	Greetings from Asbury Park, N.J.	Mike Appel; Jim Cretecos	1973	
"Mary's Place"	Bruce Springsteen	The Rising	Brendan O'Brien	2002	
"Matamoros Banks"	Bruce Springsteen	Devils & Dust	Brendan O'Brien; Chuck Plotkin; Bruce Springsteen	2005	
"Maybe I Don't Know You"	Bruce Springsteen	Streets of Philadelphia Sessions (Tracks II: The Lost Albums)	Bruce Springsteen; Chuck Plotkin; Jon Landau	2025	
"Meet Me in the City"	Bruce Springsteen	The Ties That Bind: The River Collection	Jon Landau; Bruce Springsteen; Steven Van Zandt	2015	
"Meeting Across the River"	Bruce Springsteen	Born to Run	Mike Appel; Jon Landau; Bruce Springsteen	1975	
"Merry Christmas Baby" (Bruce Springsteen & the E Street Band)	Lou Baxter; Johnny Moore †	A Very Special Christmas	Jon Landau; Chuck Plotkin; Bruce Springsteen	1987	
"Missing"	Bruce Springsteen	"Sad Eyes" CD single	Bruce Springsteen	1999	
"Moonlight Motel"	Bruce Springsteen	Western Stars	Ron Aniello; Bruce Springsteen	2019	
"Mr. Outside"	Bruce Springsteen	The Ties That Bind: The River Collection	Jon Landau; Bruce Springsteen; Steven Van Zandt	2015	
"Mrs. McGrath"	Traditional †	We Shall Overcome: The Seeger Sessions	Bruce Springsteen	2006	
"Murder Incorporated"	Bruce Springsteen	Greatest Hits	Jon Landau; Chuck Plotkin; Bruce Springsteen; Steven Van Zandt	1995	
"My Beautiful Reward"	Bruce Springsteen	Lucky Town	Jon Landau; Chuck Plotkin; Bruce Springsteen	1992	
"My Best Was Never Good Enough"	Bruce Springsteen	The Ghost of Tom Joad	Chuck Plotkin; Bruce Springsteen	1995	
"My City of Ruins"	Bruce Springsteen	The Rising	Brendan O'Brien	2002	
"My Father's House"	Bruce Springsteen	Nebraska	Bruce Springsteen	1982	
"My Hometown" (Note: An early version appears on L.A. Garage Sessions '83, as part of Tracks II: The Lost Albums (2025))	Bruce Springsteen	Born in the U.S.A.	Jon Landau; Chuck Plotkin; Bruce Springsteen; Steven Van Zandt	1984	
"My Love Will Not Let You Down"	Bruce Springsteen	Tracks	Jon Landau; Chuck Plotkin; Bruce Springsteen; Steven Van Zandt	1998	
"My Lover Man"	Bruce Springsteen	Tracks	Jon Landau; Chuck Plotkin; Bruce Springsteen; Roy Bittan	1998	
"My Lucky Day"	Bruce Springsteen	Working on a Dream	Brendan O'Brien	2009	
"My Master's Hand"	Bruce Springsteen	Faithless (Tracks II: The Lost Albums)	Bruce Springsteen; Ron Aniello	2025	
"My Master's Hand (Ballad)"	Bruce Springsteen	Faithless (Tracks II: The Lost Albums)	Bruce Springsteen; Ron Aniello	2025	
"My Oklahoma Home"	Bill and Agnes "Sis" Cunningham †	We Shall Overcome: The Seeger Sessions	Bruce Springsteen	2006	
"Nebraska"	Bruce Springsteen	Nebraska	Bruce Springsteen	1982	
"The New Timer"	Bruce Springsteen	The Ghost of Tom Joad	Chuck Plotkin; Bruce Springsteen	1995	
"New York City Serenade"	Bruce Springsteen	The Wild, the Innocent & the E Street Shuffle	Mike Appel; Jim Cretecos	1973	
"Night"	Bruce Springsteen	Born to Run	Mike Appel; Jon Landau; Bruce Springsteen	1975	
"Night Fire"	Bruce Springsteen	The Ties That Bind: The River Collection	Jon Landau; Bruce Springsteen; Steven Van Zandt	2015	
"A Night with the Jersey Devil"	Bruce Springsteen	Download-only single (Note: Also included on the deluxe edition of Working on a Dream (2012).)	Bruce Springsteen	2008	
"Nightshift" (Commodores cover)	Walter Orange; Dennis Lambert; Franne Golde †	Only the Strong Survive	Ron Aniello; Bruce Springsteen	2022	
"No Surrender"	Bruce Springsteen	Born in the U.S.A.	Jon Landau; Chuck Plotkin; Bruce Springsteen; Steven Van Zandt	1984	
"None But the Brave"	Bruce Springsteen	The Essential Bruce Springsteen (Limited Edition bonus disc)	Jon Landau; Chuck Plotkin; Bruce Springsteen	2003	
"Nothing Man"	Bruce Springsteen	The Rising	Brendan O'Brien	2002	
"O Mary Don't You Weep"	Traditional †	We Shall Overcome: The Seeger Sessions	Bruce Springsteen	2006	
"Old Dan Tucker"	Unknown; (arranged by Bruce Springsteen) †	We Shall Overcome: The Seeger Sessions	Bruce Springsteen	2006	
"On the Prowl"	Bruce Springsteen	Nebraska '82 (Expanded Edition)	Toby Scott; Jeff Henrickson (engineers)	2025	
"One Beautiful Morning"	Bruce Springsteen	Streets of Philadelphia Sessions (Tracks II: The Lost Albums)	Bruce Springsteen; Chuck Plotkin; Jon Landau	2025	
"One False Move"	Bruce Springsteen	Inyo (Tracks II: The Lost Albums)	Bruce Springsteen; Ron Aniello	2025	
"One Love"	Bruce Springsteen	L.A. Garage Sessions '83 (Tracks II: The Lost Albums)	Bruce Springsteen; Ron Aniello	2025	
"One Minute You're Here"	Bruce Springsteen	Letter to You	Ron Aniello; Bruce Springsteen	2020	
"One Step Up"	Bruce Springsteen	Tunnel of Love	Jon Landau; Chuck Plotkin; Bruce Springsteen	1987	
"One Way Street"	Bruce Springsteen	The Promise	Jon Landau; Bruce Springsteen	2010	
"Only the Strong Survive" (Jerry Butler cover)	Jerry Butler; Kenny Gamble; Leon Huff †	Only the Strong Survive	Ron Aniello; Bruce Springsteen	2022	
"Open All Night"	Bruce Springsteen	Nebraska	Bruce Springsteen	1982	
"Our Lady of Monroe"	Bruce Springsteen	Inyo (Tracks II: The Lost Albums)	Bruce Springsteen; Ron Aniello	2025	
"Out in the Street"	Bruce Springsteen	The River	Jon Landau; Bruce Springsteen; Steven Van Zandt	1980	
"Outlaw Pete"	Bruce Springsteen	Working on a Dream	Brendan O'Brien	2009	
"Outside Looking In"	Bruce Springsteen	The Promise	Jon Landau; Bruce Springsteen	2010	
"Over the Rise"	Bruce Springsteen	Tracks	Jon Landau; Chuck Plotkin; Bruce Springsteen; Roy Bittan	1998	
"Paradise"	Bruce Springsteen	The Rising	Brendan O'Brien	2002	
"Paradise by the "C"" ‡	Bruce Springsteen	Live 1975–85	Jon Landau; Chuck Plotkin; Bruce Springsteen	1986	
"Part Man, Part Monkey"	Bruce Springsteen	B-side of "57 Channels (And Nothin' On)"	Jon Landau; Chuck Plotkin; Bruce Springsteen; Roy Bittan	1992	
"Party Lights"	Bruce Springsteen	The Ties That Bind: The River Collection	Jon Landau; Bruce Springsteen; Steven Van Zandt	2015	
"Pay Me My Money Down"	Traditional †	We Shall Overcome: The Seeger Sessions	Bruce Springsteen	2006	
"Perfect World"	Bruce Springsteen	Perfect World (Tracks II: The Lost Albums)	Bruce Springsteen; Ron Aniello	2025	
"Pink Cadillac"	Bruce Springsteen	B-side of "Dancing in the Dark"	Jon Landau; Chuck Plotkin; Bruce Springsteen; Steven Van Zandt	1984	
"Point Blank"	Bruce Springsteen	The River	Jon Landau; Bruce Springsteen; Steven Van Zandt	1980	
"Pony Boy"	Traditional (Arrangement and additional lyrics by Bruce Springsteen) †	Human Touch	Jon Landau; Chuck Plotkin; Bruce Springsteen; Roy Bittan	1992	
"Poor Side of Town"	Johnny Rivers; Lou Adler †	Somewhere North of Nashville (Tracks II: The Lost Albums)	Bruce Springsteen; Ron Aniello	2025	
"The Power of Prayer"	Bruce Springsteen	Letter to You	Ron Aniello; Bruce Springsteen	2020	
"A Prayer by the River" (instrumental)	Bruce Springsteen	Faithless (Tracks II: The Lost Albums)	Bruce Springsteen; Ron Aniello	2025	
"The Price You Pay"	Bruce Springsteen	The River	Jon Landau; Bruce Springsteen; Steven Van Zandt	1980	
"The Promise"	Bruce Springsteen	18 Tracks	Jon Landau; Bruce Springsteen	1999	
"The Promised Land"	Bruce Springsteen	Darkness on the Edge of Town	Jon Landau; Bruce Springsteen; Steven Van Zandt (assistant)	1978	
"Prove It All Night"	Bruce Springsteen	Darkness on the Edge of Town	Jon Landau; Bruce Springsteen; Steven Van Zandt (assistant)	1978	
"Quarter to Three" ‡ (Gary U.S. Bonds cover; Bruce Springsteen & the E Street Band)	Gene Barge; Frank Guida; Joseph Royster; Gary Anderson †	The Legendary 1979 No Nukes Concerts	Bruce Springsteen	2021	
"Queen of the Supermarket"	Bruce Springsteen	Working on a Dream	Brendan O'Brien	2009	
"Racing in the Street"	Bruce Springsteen	Darkness on the Edge of Town	Jon Landau; Bruce Springsteen; Steven Van Zandt (assistant)	1978	
"Radio Nowhere"	Bruce Springsteen	Magic	Brendan O'Brien	2007	
"Rainmaker"	Bruce Springsteen	Letter to You	Ron Aniello; Bruce Springsteen	2020	
"A Rainy Night in Soho" (The Pogues cover)	Shane MacGowan †	20th Century Paddy – The Songs of Shane MacGowan	–	2026	
"Rain in the River"	Bruce Springsteen	Perfect World (Tracks II: The Lost Albums)	Bruce Springsteen; Ron Aniello	2025	
"Raise Your Hand" ‡ (Eddie Floyd cover)	Steve Cropper; Eddie Floyd; Alvertis Isbell †	Live 1975–85	Jon Landau; Chuck Plotkin; Bruce Springsteen	1986	
"Ramrod"	Bruce Springsteen	The River	Jon Landau; Bruce Springsteen; Steven Van Zandt	1980	
"Rave On" ‡ (Sunny West cover; Bruce Springsteen & the E Street Band)	Sunny West; Bill Tilghman; Norman Petty †	The Legendary 1979 No Nukes Concerts	Bruce Springsteen	2021	
"Real Man"	Bruce Springsteen; Roy Bittan	Human Touch	Jon Landau; Chuck Plotkin; Bruce Springsteen; Roy Bittan	1992	
"Real World"	Bruce Springsteen	Human Touch	Jon Landau; Chuck Plotkin; Bruce Springsteen; Roy Bittan	1992	
"Reason to Believe"	Bruce Springsteen	Nebraska	Bruce Springsteen	1982	
"Red Headed Woman" ‡	Bruce Springsteen	In Concert/MTV Plugged	Jon Landau; Bruce Springsteen	1993	
"Rendezvous" ‡	Bruce Springsteen	Tracks	Mike Appel; Jon Landau; Bruce Springsteen	1998	
"Reno"	Bruce Springsteen	Devils & Dust	Brendan O'Brien; Chuck Plotkin; Bruce Springsteen	2005	
"Repo Man"	Bruce Springsteen	Somewhere North of Nashville (Tracks II: The Lost Albums)	Bruce Springsteen; Ron Aniello	2025	
"Restless Nights"	Bruce Springsteen	Tracks	Jon Landau; Bruce Springsteen; Steven Van Zandt	1998	
"Rhinestone Cowboy" (Glen Campbell cover)	Larry Weiss †	Western Stars (film)	Ron Aniello; Bruce Springsteen	2019	
"Richfield Whistle"	Bruce Springsteen	L.A. Garage Sessions '83 (Tracks II: The Lost Albums)	Bruce Springsteen; Ron Aniello	2025	
"Ricky Wants a Man of Her Own"	Bruce Springsteen	Tracks	Jon Landau; Bruce Springsteen; Steven Van Zandt	1998	
"The Rising"	Bruce Springsteen	The Rising	Brendan O'Brien	2002	
"The River"	Bruce Springsteen	The River	Jon Landau; Bruce Springsteen; Steven Van Zandt	1980	
"Rocky Ground"	Bruce Springsteen	Wrecking Ball	Ron Aniello; Bruce Springsteen	2012	
"Roll of the Dice"	Bruce Springsteen; Roy Bittan	Human Touch	Jon Landau; Chuck Plotkin; Bruce Springsteen; Roy Bittan	1992	
"Rosalita (Come Out Tonight)"	Bruce Springsteen	The Wild, the Innocent & the E Street Shuffle	Mike Appel; Jim Cretecos	1973	
"Roulette"	Bruce Springsteen	B-side of "One Step Up"	Jon Landau; Bruce Springsteen; Steven Van Zandt	1988	
"Sad Eyes"	Bruce Springsteen	18 Tracks	Jon Landau; Chuck Plotkin; Roy Bittan	1999	
"Sandpaper" (Zach Bryan featuring Bruce Springsteen)	Zach Bryan †	The Great American Bar Scene	Zach Bryan; Jacquire King	2024	
"Santa Ana"	Bruce Springsteen	Tracks	Mike Appel; Jim Cretecos	1998	
"Santa Claus Is Comin' to Town" ‡	John Frederick Coots; Haven Gillespie †	B-side of "My Hometown"	Mike Appel; Jimmy Iovine; Bruce Springsteen	1985	
"Save My Love"	Bruce Springsteen	The Promise	Jon Landau; Bruce Springsteen	2010	
"Seaside Bar Song"	Bruce Springsteen	Tracks	Mike Appel; Jim Cretecos	1998	
"Secret Garden" (Note: Also included on Streets of Philadelphia Sessions, as part of Tracks II: The Lost Albums (2025))	Bruce Springsteen	Greatest Hits	Jon Landau; Chuck Plotkin; Bruce Springsteen	1995	
"Seeds" ‡	Bruce Springsteen	Live 1975–85	Jon Landau; Chuck Plotkin; Bruce Springsteen	1986	
"September Kisses"	Bruce Springsteen	Twilight Hours (Tracks II: The Lost Albums)	Bruce Springsteen; Ron Aniello	2025	
"Seven Angels"	Bruce Springsteen	Tracks	Jon Landau; Chuck Plotkin; Bruce Springsteen; Roy Bittan	1998	
"Seven Tears"	Bruce Springsteen	L.A. Garage Sessions '83 (Tracks II: The Lost Albums)	Bruce Springsteen; Ron Aniello	2025	
"Shackled and Drawn"	Bruce Springsteen	Wrecking Ball	Ron Aniello; Bruce Springsteen	2012	
"She's the One"	Bruce Springsteen	Born to Run	Mike Appel; Jon Landau; Bruce Springsteen	1975	
"Shenandoah"	Traditional †	We Shall Overcome: The Seeger Sessions	Bruce Springsteen	2006	
"Sherry Darling"	Bruce Springsteen	The River	Jon Landau; Bruce Springsteen; Steven Van Zandt	1980	
"Shut Out the Light" (Note: An early version appears on L.A. Garage Sessions '83, as part of Tracks II: The Lost Albums (2025))	Bruce Springsteen	B-side of "Born in the U.S.A."	Bruce Springsteen	1984	
"Silver Mountain"	Bruce Springsteen	Somewhere North of Nashville (Tracks II: The Lost Albums)	Bruce Springsteen; Ron Aniello	2025	
"Silver Palomino"	Bruce Springsteen	Devils & Dust	Brendan O'Brien; Chuck Plotkin; Bruce Springsteen	2005	
"Sinaloa Cowboys"	Bruce Springsteen	The Ghost of Tom Joad	Chuck Plotkin; Bruce Springsteen	1995	
"Sleepy Joe's Café"	Bruce Springsteen	Western Stars	Ron Aniello; Bruce Springsteen	2019	
"So Young and in Love"	Bruce Springsteen	Tracks	Jon Landau; Bruce Springsteen	1998	
"Someday (We'll Be Together)"	Bruce Springsteen	The Promise	Jon Landau; Bruce Springsteen	2010	
"Someday We'll Be Together" (Johnny & Jackey cover)	Johnny Bristol; Jackey Beavers; Harvey Fuqua †	Only the Strong Survive	Ron Aniello; Bruce Springsteen	2022	
"Something in the Night"	Bruce Springsteen	Darkness on the Edge of Town	Jon Landau; Bruce Springsteen; Steven Van Zandt (assistant)	1978	
"Something in the Well"	Bruce Springsteen	Streets of Philadelphia Sessions (Tracks II: The Lost Albums)	Bruce Springsteen; Chuck Plotkin; Jon Landau	2025	
"Somewhere North of Nashville" (Note: Original version appears on Somewhere North of Nashville, as part of Tracks II: The Lost Albums (2025))	Bruce Springsteen	Western Stars	Ron Aniello; Bruce Springsteen	2019	
"Song for Orphans"	Bruce Springsteen	Letter to You	Ron Aniello; Bruce Springsteen	2020	
"Soul Days" (featuring Sam Moore) (Dobie Gray cover)	Jonnie Barnett †	Only the Strong Survive	Ron Aniello; Bruce Springsteen	2022	
"Soul Driver"	Bruce Springsteen	Human Touch	Jon Landau; Chuck Plotkin; Bruce Springsteen; Roy Bittan	1992	
"Souls of the Departed"	Bruce Springsteen	Lucky Town	Jon Landau; Chuck Plotkin; Bruce Springsteen	1992	
"Spanish Eyes"	Bruce Springsteen	The Promise	Jon Landau; Bruce Springsteen	2010	
"Spare Parts"	Bruce Springsteen	Tunnel of Love	Jon Landau; Chuck Plotkin; Bruce Springsteen	1987	
"Spirit in the Night"	Bruce Springsteen	Greetings from Asbury Park, N.J.	Mike Appel; Jim Cretecos	1973	
"Stand on It" (Note: A re-recording appears on Somewhere North of Nashville, as part of Tracks II: The Lost Albums (2025))	Bruce Springsteen	B-side of "Glory Days"	Jon Landau; Chuck Plotkin; Bruce Springsteen; Steven Van Zandt	1985	
"State Trooper"	Bruce Springsteen	Nebraska	Bruce Springsteen	1982	
"Stay" (Note: Also appears on The Legendary 1979 No Nukes Concerts (2021).) ‡ (Maurice Williams cover; Bruce Springsteen & the E Street Band with Jackson Browne, Tom Petty and Rosemary Butler)	Maurice Williams †	No Nukes: The Muse Concerts for a Non-Nuclear Future	Jackson Browne; Graham Nash; John Hall; Bonnie Raitt	1979	
"Stolen Car"	Bruce Springsteen	The River	Jon Landau; Bruce Springsteen; Steven Van Zandt	1980	
"Stones"	Bruce Springsteen	Western Stars	Ron Aniello; Bruce Springsteen	2019	
"Straight Time"	Bruce Springsteen	The Ghost of Tom Joad	Chuck Plotkin; Bruce Springsteen	1995	
"Stray Bullet"	Bruce Springsteen	The Ties That Bind: The River Collection	Jon Landau; Bruce Springsteen; Steven Van Zandt	2015	
"Streets of Fire"	Bruce Springsteen	Darkness on the Edge of Town	Jon Landau; Bruce Springsteen; Steven Van Zandt (assistant)	1978	
"Streets of Minneapolis"	Bruce Springsteen	Non-album single	Bruce Springsteen	2026	
"Streets of Philadelphia" (Note: Also appears on Greatest Hits (1995).)	Bruce Springsteen	Philadelphia (soundtrack)	Chuck Plotkin; Bruce Springsteen	1993	
"Sugarland"	Bruce Springsteen	L.A. Garage Sessions '83 (Tracks II: The Lost Albums)	Bruce Springsteen; Ron Aniello	2025	
"Sunday Love"	Bruce Springsteen	Twilight Hours (Tracks II: The Lost Albums)	Bruce Springsteen; Ron Aniello	2025	
"Sundown"	Bruce Springsteen	Western Stars	Ron Aniello; Bruce Springsteen	2019	
"Sunliner"	Bruce Springsteen	Twilight Hours (Tracks II: The Lost Albums)	Bruce Springsteen; Ron Aniello	2025	
"The Sun Ain't Gonna Shine Anymore" (Frankie Valli cover)	Bob Crewe; Bob Gaudio †	Only the Strong Survive	Ron Aniello; Bruce Springsteen	2022	
"Surprise, Surprise"	Bruce Springsteen	Working on a Dream	Brendan O'Brien	2009	
"Swallowed Up (In the Belly of the Whale)"	Bruce Springsteen	Wrecking Ball (Special Edition)	Ron Aniello; Bruce Springsteen	2012	
"Take 'Em as They Come"	Bruce Springsteen	Tracks	Jon Landau; Bruce Springsteen; Steven Van Zandt	1998	
"Talk to Me"	Bruce Springsteen	The Promise	Jon Landau; Bruce Springsteen	2010	
"Tenth Avenue Freeze-Out"	Bruce Springsteen	Born to Run	Mike Appel; Jon Landau; Bruce Springsteen	1975	
"Terry's Song"	Bruce Springsteen	Magic	Brendan O'Brien	2007	
"There Goes My Miracle"	Bruce Springsteen	Western Stars	Ron Aniello; Bruce Springsteen	2019	
"This Depression"	Bruce Springsteen	Wrecking Ball	Ron Aniello; Bruce Springsteen	2012	
"This Hard Land"	Bruce Springsteen	Greatest Hits	Jon Landau; Chuck Plotkin; Bruce Springsteen	1995	
"This Is Your Sword"	Bruce Springsteen	High Hopes	Ron Aniello; Bruce Springsteen	2014	
"This Land Is Your Land" ‡ (Woody Guthrie cover)	Woody Guthrie †	Live 1975–85	Jon Landau; Chuck Plotkin; Bruce Springsteen	1986	
"This Life"	Bruce Springsteen	Working on a Dream	Brendan O'Brien	2009	
"Thunder Road"	Bruce Springsteen	Born to Run	Mike Appel; Jon Landau; Bruce Springsteen	1975	
"Thundercrack"	Bruce Springsteen	Tracks	Mike Appel; Jim Cretecos	1998	
"The Ties That Bind"	Bruce Springsteen	The River	Jon Landau; Bruce Springsteen; Steven Van Zandt	1980	
"Tiger Rose"	Bruce Springsteen	Somewhere North of Nashville (Tracks II: The Lost Albums)	Bruce Springsteen; Ron Aniello	2025	
"The Time That Never Was"	Bruce Springsteen	The Ties That Bind: The River Collection	Jon Landau; Bruce Springsteen; Steven Van Zandt	2015	
"Tomorrow Never Knows"	Bruce Springsteen	Working on a Dream	Brendan O'Brien	2009	
"Tougher Than the Rest"	Bruce Springsteen	Tunnel of Love	Jon Landau; Chuck Plotkin; Bruce Springsteen	1987	
"Trapped" ‡ (Jimmy Cliff cover)	Jimmy Cliff †	We Are the World	–	1985	
"Trouble in Paradise"	Bruce Springsteen; Roy Bittan	Tracks	Jon Landau; Chuck Plotkin; Bruce Springsteen; Roy Bittan	1998	
"Trouble River"	Bruce Springsteen	18 Tracks	Jon Landau; Chuck Plotkin; Bruce Springsteen	1999	
"Tunnel of Love"	Bruce Springsteen	Tunnel of Love	Jon Landau; Chuck Plotkin; Bruce Springsteen	1987	
"Turn Back the Hands of Time" (Tyrone Davis cover)	Jack Daniels; Bonnie Thompson †	Only the Strong Survive	Ron Aniello; Bruce Springsteen	2022	
"Turn! Turn! Turn!" (with Roger McGuinn)	Pete Seeger †	Magic Tour Highlights (EP)	John Cooper	2008	
"Tucson Train"	Bruce Springsteen	Western Stars	Ron Aniello; Bruce Springsteen	2019	
"TV Movie"	Bruce Springsteen	Tracks	Jon Landau; Chuck Plotkin; Bruce Springsteen; Steven Van Zandt	1998	
"Twilight Hours"	Bruce Springsteen	Twilight Hours (Tracks II: The Lost Albums)	Bruce Springsteen; Ron Aniello	2025	
"Two Faces"	Bruce Springsteen	Tunnel of Love	Jon Landau; Chuck Plotkin; Bruce Springsteen	1987	
"Two for the Road"	Bruce Springsteen	B-side of "Tunnel of Love"	Jon Landau; Chuck Plotkin; Bruce Springsteen	1987	
"Two Hearts"	Bruce Springsteen	The River	Jon Landau; Bruce Springsteen; Steven Van Zandt	1980	
"Two of Us"	Bruce Springsteen	Twilight Hours (Tracks II: The Lost Albums)	Bruce Springsteen; Ron Aniello	2025	
"Under a Big Sky"	Bruce Springsteen	Somewhere North of Nashville (Tracks II: The Lost Albums)	Bruce Springsteen; Ron Aniello	2025	
"Unsatisfied Heart"	Bruce Springsteen	L.A. Garage Sessions '83 (Tracks II: The Lost Albums)	Bruce Springsteen; Ron Aniello	2025	
"Used Cars"	Bruce Springsteen	Nebraska	Bruce Springsteen	1982	
"Valentine's Day"	Bruce Springsteen	Tunnel of Love	Jon Landau; Chuck Plotkin; Bruce Springsteen	1987	
"Viva Las Vegas" (Elvis Presley cover)	Doc Pomus; Mort Shuman †	The Essential Bruce Springsteen (Limited Edition bonus disc)	Jon Landau; Chuck Plotkin; Bruce Springsteen	2003	
"Wages of Sin"	Bruce Springsteen	Tracks	Jon Landau; Chuck Plotkin; Bruce Springsteen; Steven Van Zandt	1998	
"Waitin' on a Sunny Day"	Bruce Springsteen	The Rising	Brendan O'Brien	2002	
"Waiting on the End of the World"	Bruce Springsteen	Streets of Philadelphia Sessions (Tracks II: The Lost Albums)	Bruce Springsteen; Chuck Plotkin; Jon Landau	2025	
"Walk Like a Man"	Bruce Springsteen	Tunnel of Love	Jon Landau; Chuck Plotkin; Bruce Springsteen	1987	
"The Wall"	Bruce Springsteen	High Hopes	Ron Aniello; Bruce Springsteen	2014	
"War" ‡ (The Temptations cover)	Barrett Strong; Norman Whitfield †	Live 1975–85	Jon Landau; Chuck Plotkin; Bruce Springsteen	1986	
"The Way" (hidden track)	Bruce Springsteen	The Promise	Jon Landau; Bruce Springsteen	2010	
"The Wayfarer"	Bruce Springsteen	Western Stars	Ron Aniello; Bruce Springsteen	2019	
"We Are Alive"	Bruce Springsteen	Wrecking Ball	Ron Aniello; Bruce Springsteen	2012	
"We Fell Down"	Bruce Springsteen	Streets of Philadelphia Sessions (Tracks II: The Lost Albums)	Bruce Springsteen; Chuck Plotkin; Jon Landau	2025	
"We Shall Overcome"	Attr. Rev. Charles Tindley (Note: Musical and lyrical adaptation by Guy Carawan, Frank Hamilton, Zilphia Horton, and Pete Seeger) †	We Shall Overcome: The Seeger Sessions	Bruce Springsteen	2006	
"We Take Care of Our Own"	Bruce Springsteen	Wrecking Ball	Ron Aniello; Bruce Springsteen	2012	
"The Western Sea" (instrumental)	Bruce Springsteen	Faithless (Tracks II: The Lost Albums)	Bruce Springsteen; Ron Aniello	2025	
"Western Stars"	Bruce Springsteen	Western Stars	Ron Aniello; Bruce Springsteen	2019	
"What Becomes of the Brokenhearted" (Jimmy Ruffin cover)	William Weatherspoon; Paul Riser; James Dean †	Only the Strong Survive	Ron Aniello; Bruce Springsteen	2022	
"What Love Can Do"	Bruce Springsteen	Working on a Dream	Brendan O'Brien	2009	
"When I Build My Beautiful House"	Bruce Springsteen	Inyo (Tracks II: The Lost Albums)	Bruce Springsteen; Ron Aniello	2025	
"When She Was My Girl" (Four Tops cover)	Larry Gottlieb; Marc Blatte †	Only the Strong Survive	Ron Aniello; Bruce Springsteen	2022	
"When the Lights Go Out"	Bruce Springsteen	Tracks	Jon Landau; Chuck Plotkin; Bruce Springsteen; Roy Bittan	1998	
"When You're Alone"	Bruce Springsteen	Tunnel of Love	Jon Landau; Chuck Plotkin; Bruce Springsteen	1987	
"When You Need Me"	Bruce Springsteen	Tracks	Jon Landau; Chuck Plotkin; Bruce Springsteen; Steven Van Zandt	1998	
"Where the Bands Are"	Bruce Springsteen	Tracks	Jon Landau; Bruce Springsteen; Steven Van Zandt	1998	
"Where You Going, Where You From"	Bruce Springsteen	Faithless (Tracks II: The Lost Albums)	Bruce Springsteen; Ron Aniello	2025	
"Whitetown"	Bruce Springsteen	The Ties That Bind: The River Collection	Jon Landau; Bruce Springsteen; Steven Van Zandt	2015	
"Wild Billy's Circus Story"	Bruce Springsteen	The Wild, the Innocent & the E Street Shuffle	Mike Appel; Jim Cretecos	1973	
"The Wish"	Bruce Springsteen	Tracks	Jon Landau; Chuck Plotkin; Bruce Springsteen; Steven Van Zandt	1998	
"With Every Wish"	Bruce Springsteen	Human Touch	Jon Landau; Chuck Plotkin; Bruce Springsteen; Roy Bittan	1992	
"Without You"	Bruce Springsteen	Blood Brothers (EP)	Jon Landau; Chuck Plotkin; Bruce Springsteen	1996	
"Working on the Highway"	Bruce Springsteen	Born in the U.S.A.	Jon Landau; Chuck Plotkin; Bruce Springsteen; Steven Van Zandt	1984	
"Worlds Apart"	Bruce Springsteen	The Rising	Brendan O'Brien	2002	
"Working on a Dream"	Bruce Springsteen	Working on a Dream	Brendan O'Brien	2009	
"Wreck on the Highway"	Bruce Springsteen	The River	Jon Landau; Bruce Springsteen; Steven Van Zandt	1980	
"Wrecking Ball"	Bruce Springsteen	Wrecking Ball	Ron Aniello; Bruce Springsteen	2012	
"The Wrestler" (Note: Written for the 2008 film The Wrestler and appears as a hidden bonus track on Working on a Dream (2012).)	Bruce Springsteen	Working on a Dream	Bruce Springsteen	2009	
"Wrong Side of the Street"	Bruce Springsteen	The Promise	Jon Landau; Bruce Springsteen	2010	
"Youngstown"	Bruce Springsteen	The Ghost of Tom Joad	Chuck Plotkin; Bruce Springsteen	1995	
"You Can Look (But You Better Not Touch)"	Bruce Springsteen	The River	Jon Landau; Bruce Springsteen; Steven Van Zandt	1980	
"You Can't Judge a Book by the Cover" (The Castiles; Willie Dixon cover)	Willie Dixon †	Chapter and Verse	Bruce Springsteen	2016	
"You Lifted Me Up"	Bruce Springsteen	Perfect World (Tracks II: The Lost Albums)	Bruce Springsteen; Ron Aniello	2025	
"Your Own Worst Enemy"	Bruce Springsteen	Magic	Brendan O'Brien	2007	
"You'll Be Comin' Down"	Bruce Springsteen	Magic	Brendan O'Brien	2007	
"You're Gonna Miss Me When I'm Gone"	Bruce Springsteen	Somewhere North of Nashville (Tracks II: The Lost Albums)	Bruce Springsteen; Ron Aniello	2025	
"You're Missing"	Bruce Springsteen	The Rising	Brendan O'Brien	2002	
"You've Got It"	Bruce Springsteen	Wrecking Ball	Ron Aniello; Bruce Springsteen	2012	
"Zero and Blind Terry"	Bruce Springsteen	Tracks	Mike Appel; Jim Cretecos	1998	

== Unreleased songs ==
List of unreleased songs, showing title, year of origin, and details
Title	Year of origin	Details
"1945"	1995	The Ghost of Tom Joad (1995) outtake
"American Man"	2011	Wrecking Ball (2012) outtake
"Arabian Night"	1972	Recorded at Springsteen's first studio session in June 1972
"Architect Angel"	1973	Demoed in January 1973; appeared on a September 1973 shortlist for The Wild, the Innocent & the E Street Shuffle (1973)
"Baby I'm So Cold"	1982	Born in the U.S.A. (1984) outtake
"The Ballad"	1977	Darkness on the Edge of Town (1978) outtake
"Ballad of a Self-Loathing Pistol"	1973	Demoed in January 1973
"Betty Jean"	1983	Outtake from the early 1983 Los Angeles home sessions
"Bishop Danced"	1973	Performed live in the first half of 1973
"Can't Help Falling in Love"	1977–1978	Elvis Presley cover; recorded during the sessions for Darkness on the Edge of Town (1978) and considered for the Darkness Tour
"Cheap Motel"	1995	The Ghost of Tom Joad (1995) outtake
"Chicken Lips and Lizard Hips"	1991–1992	Human Touch (1992) outtake
"The Chosen"	1972	Greetings from Asbury Park, N.J. (1973) outtake
"Chrissie's Song"	1974	Born to Run (1975) outtake
"Cold Spot"	2013	High Hopes (2014) outtake
"Delivery Man"	1983	Outtake from the early 1983 Los Angeles home sessions
"Drop On Down and Cover Me"	1982–1983	Born in the U.S.A. (1984) outtake; a re-recording of that album's "Cover Me"
"English Sons"	1977	Darkness on the Edge of Town (1978) outtake
"Evacuation of the West"	1973	The Wild, the Innocent & the E Street Shuffle (1973) outtake
"Fade to Black"	1982	Born in the U.S.A. (1984) outtake
"Family Song"	1972	Demoed in 1972
"Fire on the Wing"	1973	The Wild, the Innocent & the E Street Shuffle (1973) outtake; shortlisted for Tracks (1998)
"Gone Gone Gone"	1983	Logged during the July 1983 sessions for Born in the U.S.A. (1984); later performed live during the Born in the U.S.A. Tour under the title "Seeds"
"I Come and Stand at Every Door"	2005–2006	We Shall Overcome: The Seeger Sessions (2006) outtake
"I Don't Care"	1983	Outtake from the early 1983 Los Angeles home sessions
"I Met Her In a Tourist Trap in Tiguara"	1973	Demoed in January 1973
"If I Had a Hammer"	2005–2006	We Shall Overcome: The Seeger Sessions (2006) outtake
"It's the Little Things That Count"	1995	Performed live on the Ghost of Tom Joad Tour; Devils & Dust (2005) outtake
"I'm a Coward (When It Comes to Love)"	1987	Tunnel of Love (1987) outtake; performed live on the Tunnel of Love Express Tour
"I'm Going Back"	1977	Darkness on the Edge of Town (1978) outtake
"I'm Turning into Elvis"	1995	The Ghost of Tom Joad (1995) outtake
"Jesse James and Robert Ford"	1982	Born in the U.S.A. (1984) outtake
"Jole Blon"	1980	The River (1980) outtake; Springsteen gave the song to Gary U.S. Bonds, who released his version on his album Dedication (1981).
"Just Around the Corner to the Light of Day"	1983	Logged during the July 1983 sessions for Born in the U.S.A. (1984)
"Lady and the Doctor"	1972	Shortlisted for Greetings from Asbury Park, N.J. (1973)
"Marie"	1972	Written in 1972 around the same time as "For You"
"Michael, Row the Boat Ashore"	2005–2006	We Shall Overcome: The Seeger Sessions (2006) outtake
"The Money We Didn't Make"	1983	Outtake from the early 1983 Los Angeles home sessions
"New York City Song"	1973	Demoed in January 1973 and performed live throughout the same year
"A Night Like This"	1974	Demoed in October 1974; Born to Run (1975) outtake
"No Need"	1972	Written in 1972 around the same time as "For You"
"Once Upon a Time in the West"	2005–2006	We Shall Overcome: The Seeger Sessions (2006) outtake
"Out On the Run (Looking for Love)"	1980	The River (1980) outtake
"Preacher's Daughter"	1977	Darkness on the Edge of Town (1978) outtake
"Pretty Baby, Will You Be Mine"	1987	Tunnel of Love (1987) outtake
"Pretty Boy Floyd"	2005–2006	We Shall Overcome: The Seeger Sessions (2006) outtake
"Prodigal Son"	1972	Demoed in 1972
"Protection"	1982	Originally written for Donna Summer, Springsteen recorded his own version with the E Street Band in February 1982.
"Sell It and They Will Come"	1995	Performed live on the Ghost of Tom Joad Tour
"Street Queen"	1972	Demoed in 1972
"Things Ain't That Way"	1987	Tunnel of Love (1987) outtake
"Tokyo"	1973	Demoed in February 1973; performed live into 1974
"True Love is Hard to Come By"	1982	Born in the U.S.A. (1984) outtake
"Two Hearts in True Waltz Time"	1972	Appeared on Springsteen's May 1972 audition demo tape for Columbia Records
"Visitation at Fort Horn"	1972	Appeared on provisional track listings for Greetings from Asbury Park, N.J. (1973) before being replaced by "Spirit in the Night" and "Blinded by the Light"
"Walking in the Street" a.k.a. "Lovers in the Cold"	1974	Born to Run (1975) outtake
"William Davis"	1982	Born in the U.S.A. (1984) outtake
"Winter Song"	1973	Demoed in January 1973
"Worried Man Blues"	2005–2006	We Shall Overcome: The Seeger Sessions (2006) outtake
"You Mean So Much to Me"	1973	Performed live in the first half of 1973
"Your Love is All Around Me"	1982	Born in the U.S.A. (1984) outtake
