= No Nukes (film) =

- Directed by: Daniel Goldberg; Anthony Potenza; Julian Schlossberg
- Produced by: Daniel Goldberg; Julian Schlossberg; Barbara Kopple (Uncredited)
- Starring: Jackson Browne; Graham Nash; Bonnie Raitt; John Hall; James Taylor; Carly Simon; The Doobie Brothers; Bruce Springsteen & The E Street Band
- Cinematography: Haskell Wexler
- Edited by: Neil L. Kaufman
- Distributed by: Warner Bros. Pictures
- Release date: July 18, 1980
- Running time: 103 minutes
- Country: United States
- Language: English

No Nukes is a 1980 documentary and concert film that contained selections from the September 1979 Madison Square Garden concerts by the Musicians United for Safe Energy collective, with Jackson Browne, Graham Nash, Bonnie Raitt, and John Hall being the key organizers of the event and guiding forces behind the film. Also included were scenes of the organizers getting the event together, expounding upon the dangers of nuclear power, and staging an anti-nuclear rally at Battery Park in New York City.

== History ==
This was the first official appearance of Bruce Springsteen & The E Street Band's live act on film, and many critics hailed their performances as the best in the documentary. Additionally, the future Springsteen classic "The River" was debuted at these shows and on the film, as well as Chaka Khan's consternation at being "Broooced" (Raitt deadpanned backstage, "Too bad his name wasn't Melvin"). The other generally acclaimed highlight of the film was Carly Simon and then-husband James Taylor's physically dynamic duet on "Mockingbird". On the other hand, Graham Nash's earnest spoken part about having seen "giant sponges" as a side effect of nuclear waste dumps earned itself a Spinal Tap-like reputation for rock star verbal blundering.

No Nukes was released for home consumption on VHS, Betamax and LaserDisc along the way, but as of 2023 not on DVD. Two of Springsteen's three numbers are available on his 2001 The Complete Video Anthology / 1978-2000 DVD, and 13 of his performances at the concerts were released in 2021 on the live album and film The Legendary 1979 No Nukes Concerts.

The No Nukes live album was also released in May 1980 from this event, although it contained varying musical contents from the film (generally, the artists' biggest hits make it into the film but not the album, while some artists are on the album but not in the film).

== Performers and songs ==
Those who performed in the film in order of appearance,

at Madison Square Garden:

- "Mockingbird" - James Taylor and Carly Simon
- "Runaway" - Bonnie Raitt
- "The Times They Are a-Changin'" - James Taylor, Carly Simon, Graham Nash, John Hall (portion)
- "Suite: Judy Blue Eyes" – Crosby, Stills & Nash (portions rehearsing in a quiet corner, then on-stage)
- "Running on Empty" – Jackson Browne
- "Before the Deluge" – Jackson Browne (portion)
- "Dependin' on You" - The Doobie Brothers
- "What a Fool Believes" - The Doobie Brothers
- "Barrel of Pain" – Graham Nash
- "Your Smiling Face" – James Taylor
- "Stand and Fight" – James Taylor (portion, more played over end credits)
- "We Almost Lost Detroit" - Gil Scott-Heron
- "Our House" – Graham Nash (portions with his family, then on-stage)
- "The River" – Bruce Springsteen & The E Street Band
- "Thunder Road" – Bruce Springsteen & The E Street Band
- "Quarter to Three" – Bruce Springsteen & The E Street Band
- "Takin' It to the Streets" - The Doobie Brothers with James Taylor, Carly Simon, John Hall, Graham Nash, others

at Battery Park:

- "No More Nukes" – Joy Ryder/Avis Davis Band
- "Power" – John Hall with Jackson Browne, Carly Simon, Graham Nash, Stephen Stills, Bonnie Raitt, others
- "Get Together" – Jesse Colin Young with the previous assortment

Other famous personalities and celebrities are seen during the film, including Jane Fonda, Chaka Khan, Maggie Kuhn of the Gray Panthers, Ray Parker Jr., Ralph Nader, Steven Tyler of Aerosmith, Nicolette Larson, Phoebe Snow, and ubiquitous backup singer Rosemary Butler.

A controversy sparked after the performance of Jamaican reggae singer Peter Tosh wearing Palestinian clothing (thawb and keffiyeh) and openly smoking marijuana. Tosh's appearance was considered a provocation towards the Jewish community in New York City, as the concerts took place during the Jewish New Year holiday. Despite his performance being advertised to appear in the accompanying film and on the triple live album, Tosh was removed from both releases.
