= Springsteen on Broadway (album) =

2018 album by Bruce Springsteen

Live album by Bruce Springsteen
- Released: December 14, 2018
- Recorded: July 17–18, 2018
- Genre: Acoustic rock
- Length: 145:43
- Label: Columbia
- Producer: Bruce Springsteen

Bruce Springsteen chronology
Chapter and Verse (2016)	Springsteen on Broadway (2018)	Western Stars (2019)

Springsteen on Broadway is a live album by the American rock singer-songwriter Bruce Springsteen. It features the complete audio of Springsteen's solo Broadway performance at the Walter Kerr Theatre in New York, recorded live on July 17 and 18, 2018, and filmed for Netflix. The album was released on December 14, 2018, by Columbia Records.

After release, Springsteen on Broadway impacted the top 10 of record charts in more than 10 countries, including Australia, Germany, Italy, the Netherlands, Switzerland, and the United Kingdom. In the United States, it reached number 11 on the Billboard 200. A widespread critical success, the album was praised for examining Springsteen's recording persona and an autobiographical dimension recalling the musician's 2016 autobiography Born to Run.

== Critical reception ==
Professional ratings
Aggregate scores
Source	Rating
Metacritic	87/100
Review scores
Source	Rating
AllMusic	3.5/5 stars
Financial Times	4/5 stars
The Guardian	4/5 stars
The Independent	4/5 stars
The Irish Times	4/5 stars
The Observer	4/5 stars
Pitchfork	8/10
Rolling Stone	4.5/5 stars
Uncut	9/10
Vice (Expert Witness)	A

Springsteen on Broadway was met with widespread critical acclaim. At Metacritic, which assigns a normalized rating out of 100 to reviews from mainstream publications, the album received an average score of 87, based on 15 reviews.

Reviewing for The Daily Telegraph in December 2018, Neil McCormick said "Springsteen on Broadway may not have the musical expanse of his work with the E Street Band, but it is still as powerful as any album he has ever made", especially applauding its autobiographical dimension, which he compared to Springsteen's 2016 autobiography Born to Run. McCormick also highlighted Springsteen's humor and instincts as an onstage anecdotist. Alexis Petridis of The Guardian said listeners of the album will learn that Springsteen's recording persona is "as much a contrived character" as David Bowie's Ziggy Stardust character. Overall, he found that this "cocktail of homespun wisdom, frankness and blatant yarn-spinning is genuinely enthralling, a portrait of the rock star as a complex, conflicted 69-year-old man."

In hailing the performance as "a new type of rock show", Record Collector magazine's Jamie Atkins felt Springsteen is the only musician of his pedigree to have "the connection with their audience, the storytelling nous, the humour and pathos". In Rolling Stone, Will Hermes described it as "by turns audiobook, podcast, and live album, and at its most potent when it becomes a hybrid of the three", while Kitty Empire regarded it as being "located somewhere between a TED talk, an episode of VH1's Storytellers and a confessional ... a hugely nourishing listen". Despite having never been "big on extended spoken-word material or solo-acoustic remakes of exalted songbooks", Robert Christgau said in his column for Vice that he was impressed by performance. In appraising the record as a whole, he said:

The Springsteen this most recalls isn't like any earlier album but the 2016 autobiography he called Born to Run for better reasons than you might imagine. Like that fast-reading 508-pager, its aim is to simultaneously depict and demythologize the Jersey shore and poke major holes in an authenticity it reconceives at a truer level of complexity.

== Track listing ==
All tracks are written by Bruce Springsteen.

Disc one
No.	Title	Length
1.	"Growin' Up (Introduction)"	2:04
2.	"Growin' Up"	11:59
3.	"My Hometown (Introduction Part 1)"	3:44
4.	"My Hometown (Introduction Part 2)"	3:36
5.	"My Hometown"	3:59
6.	"My Father's House (Introduction)"	4:28
7.	"My Father's House"	6:22
8.	"The Wish (Introduction)"	6:09
9.	"The Wish"	4:24
10.	"Thunder Road (Introduction)"	3:19
11.	"Thunder Road"	5:28
12.	"The Promised Land (Introduction Part 1)"	3:35
13.	"The Promised Land (Introduction Part 2)"	3:34
14.	"The Promised Land (Introduction Part 3)"	4:15
15.	"The Promised Land"	3:59

Disc two
No.	Title	Length
1.	"Born in the U.S.A. (Introduction Part 1)"	4:16
2.	"Born in the U.S.A. (Introduction Part 2)"	3:46
3.	"Born in the U.S.A."	4:44
4.	"Tenth Avenue Freeze-Out (Introduction)"	1:10
5.	"Tenth Avenue Freeze-Out"	7:56
6.	"Tougher Than the Rest (Introduction)"	1:25
7.	"Tougher Than the Rest" (w/ Patti Scialfa)	4:29
8.	"Brilliant Disguise (Introduction)"	1:43
9.	"Brilliant Disguise" (w/ Patti Scialfa)	4:47
10.	"Long Time Comin' (Introduction)"	3:08
11.	"Long Time Comin'"	3:54
12.	"The Ghost of Tom Joad (Introduction)"	3:27
13.	"The Ghost of Tom Joad"	4:36
14.	"The Rising"	4:33
15.	"Dancing in the Dark (Introduction)"	2:47
16.	"Dancing in the Dark"	4:10
17.	"Land of Hope and Dreams"	3:57
18.	"Born to Run (Introduction Part 1)"	3:54
19.	"Born to Run (Introduction Part 2)"	3:41
20.	"Born to Run"	5:08
Total length:		145:43

== Personnel ==
Credits adapted from the album's liner notes.

- Bruce Springsteen – vocals, guitar, piano, harmonica
- Patti Scialfa – vocals and guitar on "Tougher Than the Rest" and "Brilliant Disguise"

Technical personnel

- Bruce Springsteen – production
- John Cooper, Greg Allen – recording
- Bob Clearmountain – mixing
- Sergio Ruelas Jr. – music editor
- Brandon Duncan – associate music editor
- Bob Ludwig – mastering
- Brian Ronan – sound design
- Brett Dicus – technical manager
- Rob Lebret – technical coordinator
- Mary O'Brien – personal assistant to the Springsteens
- Benjamin Travis – general manager
- Kevin Buell – guitar technician
- John Cooper – house mixer
- Dan Lee – teleprompter
- Shannon Slaton – deck audio, monitors mixer
- Mike Tracy – associate sound designer
- Chris Sloan – production sound
- Mike Miccio – piano technician
- Michelle Holme – art direction, design
- Danny Clinch, Rob Demartin, Prez Powerz – photography

== Charts ==
=== Weekly charts ===
Chart (2018–2019)	Peak position
Australian Albums (ARIA)	6
Austrian Albums (Ö3 Austria)	1
Belgian Albums (Ultratop Flanders)	3
Belgian Albums (Ultratop Wallonia)	29
Canadian Albums (Billboard)	36
Croatian International Albums (HDU)	1
Danish Albums (Hitlisten)	14
Dutch Albums (Album Top 100)	2
Finnish Albums (Suomen virallinen lista)	13
French Albums (SNEP)	27
German Albums (Offizielle Top 100)	7
Irish Albums (IRMA)	4
Italian Albums (FIMI)	2
New Zealand Albums (RMNZ)	12
Norwegian Albums (VG-lista)	8
Portuguese Albums (AFP)	15
Scottish Albums (Official Charts)	5
Spanish Albums (Promusicae)	11
Swedish Albums (Sverigetopplistan)	4
Swiss Albums (Schweizer Hitparade)	2
UK Albums (Official Charts)	6
US Billboard 200	11
US Top Rock Albums (Billboard)	2

=== Year-end charts ===
Chart (2018)	Position
Italian Albums (FIMI)	86

Chart (2019)	Position
Belgian Albums (Ultratop Flanders)	169
Spanish Albums (PROMUSICAE)	94
Swiss Albums (Schweizer Hitparade)	82
US Top Rock Albums (Billboard)	80

== Certifications ==
Region	Certification	Certified units/sales
Italy (FIMI)	Gold	25,000^{‡}
United Kingdom (BPI)	Silver	60,000^{‡}
^{‡} Sales+streaming figures based on certification alone.
