= Stand on It (Bruce Springsteen song) =

Single by Mel McDaniel

from the album Just Can't Sit Down Music
- B-side: "In Oklahoma"
- Released: September 15, 1986
- Recorded: April 1986
- Genre: Country
- Length: 2:35
- Label: Capitol Nashville
- Songwriter: Bruce Springsteen
- Producer: Jerry Kennedy

Mel McDaniel singles chronology
| "Doctor's Orders" (1986) | "Stand on It" (1986) | "Oh What a Night" (1987) |

"Stand on It" is a song written and originally recorded by Bruce Springsteen. Springsteen initially released it as the non-LP B-side of the "Glory Days" single in May 1985; the track was also featured in the film Ruthless People and its accompanying soundtrack album. "Stand On It" later appeared in a slightly longer version with an extra verse on Springsteen's outtakes and B-sides compilation Tracks. Another version appeared on the 2025 follow up to that collection, Tracks II: The Lost Albums.

A little over a year after Springsteen's release, the song was recorded by American country music artist Mel McDaniel. It was released in September 1986 as the lead single from McDaniel's album, Just Can't Sit Down Music. It peaked at number 12 on the U.S. Billboard Hot Country Singles & Tracks chart and number 5 on the Canadian RPM Country Tracks chart.

== Personnel (Springsteen version) ==
According to authors Philippe Margotin and Jean-Michel Guesdon:

- Bruce Springsteen – vocals, guitars
- Roy Bittan – piano
- Garry Tallent – bass
- Max Weinberg – drums

== Chart performance ==
"Stand on It" debuted at number 70 on the U.S. Billboard Hot Country Singles & Tracks for the week of September 27, 1986.

| Chart (1986–1987) | Peak position |
|---|---|
| U.S. Billboard Hot Country Singles & Tracks | 12 |
| Canadian RPM Country Tracks | 5 |
