= Tracks II: The Lost Albums =

2025 box set by Bruce Springsteen

Box set by Bruce Springsteen
- Released: June 27, 2025
- Recorded: 1983–2018
- Length: 319:48
- Label: Columbia
- Producers: Bruce Springsteen; Ron Aniello; Jon Landau; Chuck Plotkin

Bruce Springsteen chronology
Best of Bruce Springsteen (2024)	Tracks II: The Lost Albums (2025)

Bruce Springsteen and the E Street Band chronology
Best of Bruce Springsteen (2024)	Tracks II: The Lost Albums (2025)

Singles from Tracks II: The Lost Albums
- 1. "Rain in the River" Released: April 3, 2025; 2. "Blind Spot" Released: April 17, 2025; 3. "Faithless" Released: May 1, 2025; 4. "Repo Man" Released: May 14, 2025; 5. "Adelita" Released: May 29, 2025; 6. "Sunday Love" Released: June 12, 2025; 7. "Unsatisfied Heart" Released: June 27, 2025

Tracks II: The Lost Albums is a box set compilation album by American singer-songwriter Bruce Springsteen. It was released on June 27, 2025, through Columbia Records and serves as a follow-up to his 1998 box set Tracks, featuring previously unreleased songs recorded between 1983 and 2018. The collection is organized into seven thematic albums, each showcasing rare and archival material from various sessions throughout Springsteen's career. To promote the release of the box set, Springsteen released six songs, one every two weeks, as promotional singles prior to the release of the box set.

The box set received the Grammy Award for Best Recording Package at the 68th Annual Grammy Awards in 2026.

== Background and development ==
The box set includes seven full-length and unreleased albums, spanning 83 songs in total, 74 of them previously unheard. All of the songs were written and recorded between 1983 and 2018. Following the release of his first box set Tracks, it was long speculated as to when Springsteen would release a sequel. In a 2017 interview with Vulture, he explained that the records had never been released because they did not feel "essential" to him, even if he liked them or had fun recording them. However, during the COVID-19 pandemic in 2020, the singer-songwriter dug through his vault in order to leave the narrative of his "lost 90s" behind. According to Springsteen, Tracks II includes "complete records," some of which were even mixed and mastered. He had played some of the music for himself and, at times, for close friends over the years.

The unreleased albums in Tracks II: The Lost Albums highlight different phases of Springsteen's work. LA Garage Sessions '83 features raw, lo-fi recordings from the period between Nebraska and Born in the U.S.A. Somewhere North of Nashville leans into country rock, Inyo channels spaghetti western themes, Twilight Hours explores cinematic, melancholic soundscapes, and Faithless offers a spiritually tinged, filmic atmosphere.

A seventeen-minute documentary titled Inside Tracks II: The Lost Albums was released on June 20, 2025, that gives viewers an in-depth look at each Lost Album as told by Springsteen himself.

In June 2025, Springsteen confirmed that there would also be a third and final box set, Tracks III, potentially to be released in the next three years. He stated that Tracks III would be similar to the first Tracks box set, containing songs from across his entire career rather than complete albums. While an official track list has not been released, Springsteen has said that Tracks III will contain a previously unreleased cover of Bob Dylan's "I Want You."

== Critical reception ==
Professional ratings
Aggregate scores
Source	Rating
Metacritic	95/100
Review scores
Source	Rating
AllMusic	4.5/5 stars
Clash	8/10
Classic Rock	10/10
Mojo	5/5 stars
Pitchfork	8.5/10
Record Collector	4/5 stars
Rolling Stone	4.5/5 stars
Uncut	9/10

According to the review aggregator Metacritic, Tracks II: The Lost Albums received "universal acclaim" based on a weighted average score of 95 out of 100 from 8 critic scores.

== Track listing ==
All songs are written by Bruce Springsteen, except where noted.

=== L.A. Garage Sessions '83 ===
Recorded in 1983 between the recording sessions of Nebraska and Born in the U.S.A.. All songs produced by Bruce Springsteen and Ron Aniello.

L.A. Garage Sessions '83 track listing
No.	Title	Writer(s)	Length
1.	"Follow That Dream"	Fred Wise, Ben Weisman	3:53
2.	"Don't Back Down on Our Love"		3:01
3.	"Little Girl Like You"		1:22
4.	"Johnny Bye Bye"	Bruce Springsteen, Chuck Berry	2:48
5.	"Sugarland"		2:50
6.	"Seven Tears"		1:51
7.	"Fugitive's Dream"		3:51
8.	"Black Mountain Ballad"		4:14
9.	"Jim Deer"		3:09
10.	"County Fair"		4:55
11.	"My Hometown"		4:44
12.	"One Love"		3:38
13.	"Don't Back Down"		3:09
14.	"Richfield Whistle"		6:45
15.	"The Klansman"		2:50
16.	"Unsatisfied Heart"		5:45
17.	"Shut Out the Light"		4:27
18.	"Fugitive's Dream (Ballad)"		4:00
Total length:			67:24

=== Streets of Philadelphia Sessions ===
Recordings from 1993–1994. All songs are produced by Bruce Springsteen, Chuck Plotkin, and Jon Landau.

Streets of Philadelphia Sessions track listing
No.	Title	Length
1.	"Blind Spot"	3:35
2.	"Maybe I Don't Know You"	3:56
3.	"Something in the Well"	4:24
4.	"Waiting on the End of the World"	4:35
5.	"The Little Things"	3:26
6.	"We Fell Down"	4:31
7.	"One Beautiful Morning"	4:26
8.	"Between Heaven and Earth"	4:33
9.	"Secret Garden"	4:00
10.	"The Farewell Party"	4:09
Total length:		41:35

=== Faithless ===
Recorded in 2005–2006, except "Let Me Ride" (recorded 1994). The album was intended to be a soundtrack for a "spiritual Western" film that was never produced. All songs produced by Bruce Springsteen and Ron Aniello.

Faithless track listing
No.	Title	Length
1.	"The Desert" (instrumental)	1:36
2.	"Where You Going, Where You From"	4:19
3.	"Faithless"	3:51
4.	"All God's Children"	4:27
5.	"A Prayer by the River" (instrumental)	1:46
6.	"God Sent You"	3:47
7.	"Goin' to California"	3:49
8.	"The Western Sea" (instrumental)	1:19
9.	"My Master's Hand"	4:06
10.	"Let Me Ride"	2:58
11.	"My Master's Hand (Theme)"	3:27
Total length:		35:25

=== Somewhere North of Nashville ===
Recorded in 1995 alongside The Ghost of Tom Joad sessions, except "Under a Big Sky" (recorded 1997–98). The title track was eventually re-recorded and included on Western Stars in 2019. All songs produced by Bruce Springsteen and Ron Aniello.

Somewhere North of Nashville track listing
No.	Title	Writer(s)	Length
1.	"Repo Man"		2:55
2.	"Tiger Rose"		1:57
3.	"Poor Side of Town"	Johnny Rivers, Lou Adler	3:06
4.	"Delivery Man"		2:44
5.	"Under a Big Sky"		4:23
6.	"Detail Man"		2:48
7.	"Silver Mountain"		3:06
8.	"Janey Don't You Lose Heart"		3:30
9.	"You're Gonna Miss Me When I'm Gone"		2:59
10.	"Stand on It"		3:11
11.	"Blue Highway"		3:18
12.	"Somewhere North of Nashville"		3:04
Total length:			36:57

=== Inyo ===
Recorded during the Ghost of Tom Joad tour (1995–1997), except "One False Move" and "When I Build My Beautiful House (recorded 1994), and "The Lost Charro" and "Ciudad Juarez" (recorded 2010–11). All songs produced by Bruce Springsteen and Ron Aniello.

Inyo track listing
No.	Title	Length
1.	"Inyo"	4:36
2.	"Indian Town"	3:18
3.	"Adelita"	4:37
4.	"The Aztec Dance"	4:45
5.	"The Lost Charro"	4:47
6.	"Our Lady of Monroe"	3:57
7.	"El Jardinero (Upon the Death of Ramona)"	5:14
8.	"One False Move"	3:24
9.	"Ciudad Juarez"	3:57
10.	"When I Build My Beautiful House"	3:02
Total length:		41:37

=== Twilight Hours ===
Originally recorded 2010–2011 and 2017–2018, during the Western Stars sessions, except "I'll Stand by You" (recorded 2001). All songs produced by Bruce Springsteen and Ron Aniello.

Twilight Hours track listing
No.	Title	Length
1.	"Sunday Love"	5:16
2.	"Late in the Evening"	4:44
3.	"Two of Us"	5:10
4.	"Lonely Town"	6:38
5.	"September Kisses"	3:32
6.	"Twilight Hours"	3:23
7.	"I'll Stand by You"	4:37
8.	"High Sierra"	6:25
9.	"Sunliner"	3:05
10.	"Another You"	5:19
11.	"Dinner at Eight"	4:09
12.	"Follow the Sun"	3:36
Total length:		55:54

=== Perfect World ===
Recordings from 1994 to 2011. All songs produced by Bruce Springsteen and Ron Aniello.

Perfect World track listing
No.	Title	Writer(s)	Length
1.	"I'm Not Sleeping"	Bruce Springsteen, Joe Grushecky	3:37
2.	"Idiot's Delight"	Bruce Springsteen, Joe Grushecky	3:34
3.	"Another Thin Line"	Bruce Springsteen, Joe Grushecky	4:46
4.	"The Great Depression"		3:47
5.	"Blind Man"		4:30
6.	"Rain in the River"		3:12
7.	"If I Could Only Be Your Lover"		5:21
8.	"Cutting Knife"		5:03
9.	"You Lifted Me Up"		3:37
10.	"Perfect World"		3:37
Total length:			41:04 319:48

== Charts ==
=== Weekly charts ===
Weekly chart performance for Tracks II: The Lost Albums
Chart (2025)	Peak position
Australian Albums (ARIA)	21
Austrian Albums (Ö3 Austria)	3
Belgian Albums (Ultratop Flanders)	2
Belgian Albums (Ultratop Wallonia)	8
Croatian International Albums (HDU)	10
Danish Albums (Hitlisten)	13
Dutch Albums (Album Top 100)	1
Finnish Albums (Suomen virallinen lista)	24
French Albums (SNEP)	33
French Rock & Metal Albums (SNEP)	3
German Albums (Offizielle Top 100)	1
Greek Albums (IFPI)	57
Irish Albums (Official Charts)	8
Italian Albums (FIMI)	21
Japanese Rock Albums (Oricon)	7
New Zealand Albums (RMNZ)	27
Norwegian Albums (IFPI Norge)	5
Scottish Albums (Official Charts)	2
Spanish Albums (PROMUSICAE)	9
Swedish Albums (Sverigetopplistan)	1
Swiss Albums (Schweizer Hitparade)	2
UK Albums (Official Charts)	2
UK Americana Albums (Official Charts)	1
US Billboard 200	67
US Americana/Folk Albums (Billboard)	7
US Top Rock & Alternative Albums (Billboard)	15

=== Year-end charts ===
Year-end chart performance for Tracks II: The Lost Albums
Chart (2025)	Position
German Albums (Offizielle Top 100)	58
Swiss Albums (Schweizer Hitparade)	85

== Lost and Found: Selections from The Lost Albums ==
Lost and Found: Selections from The Lost Albums

Compilation album by Bruce Springsteen
- Released: June 27, 2025
- Recorded: 1983–2018
- Length: 79:38
- Label: Columbia
- Producers: Ron Aniello; Jon Landau; Bruce Springsteen

A companion compilation album titled Lost and Found: Selections from The Lost Albums was also released on June 27, 2025. It features twenty highlights selected by Springsteen from across the collection of Tracks II: The Lost Albums. The album is a two-LP vinyl set or single CD and includes a personal introduction from Springsteen.

Lost and Found: Selections from The Lost Albums track listing
No.	Title	Length
1.	"Follow That Dream"	3:53
2.	"Seven Tears"	1:51
3.	"Unsatisfied Heart"	5:45
4.	"Blind Spot"	3:35
5.	"Something in the Well"	4:24
6.	"Waiting on the End of the World"	4:35
7.	"Faithless"	3:51
8.	"God Sent You"	3:47
9.	"Repo Man"	2:55
10.	"Detail Man"	2:48
11.	"You're Gonna Miss Me When I'm Gone"	2:59
12.	"The Lost Charro"	4:47
13.	"Inyo"	4:36
14.	"Adelita"	4:37
15.	"Sunday Love"	5:19
16.	"High Sierra"	6:25
17.	"Sunliner"	3:05
18.	"I'm Not Sleeping"	3:37
19.	"Rain in the River"	3:12
20.	"You Lifted Me Up"	3:37

=== Charts ===
==== Weekly charts ====
Weekly chart performance for Lost and Found: Selections from The Lost Albums
Chart (2025)	Peak position
Austrian Albums (Ö3 Austria)	2
Belgian Albums (Ultratop Flanders)	7
Belgian Albums (Ultratop Wallonia)	22
Croatian International Albums (HDU)	8
Dutch Albums (Album Top 100)	9
French Albums (SNEP)	24
French Rock & Metal Albums (SNEP)	1
German Albums (Offizielle Top 100)	5
Greek Albums (IFPI)	72
Italian Albums (FIMI)	20
Japanese Albums (Oricon)	35
Japanese Rock Albums (Oricon)	5
Japanese Top Albums Sales (Billboard Japan)	40
Norwegian Albums (IFPI Norge)	57
Polish Albums (ZPAV)	100
Portuguese Albums (AFP)	113
US Folk Albums (Billboard)	22
US Top Album Sales (Billboard)	16

==== Monthly charts ====
Monthly chart performance for Lost and Found: Selections from The Lost Albums
Chart (2025)	Position
Japanese Rock Albums (Oricon)	26
