= No Nukes: The Muse Concerts for a Non-Nuclear Future =

1979 live triple album by various artists from Madison Square Garden

No Nukes

Live album by various artists
- Released: November 1979
- Recorded: September 19–23, 1979
- Genre: Rock
- Length: 115:51
- Label: Asylum
- Producers: Jackson Browne, Graham Nash, John Hall & Bonnie Raitt

Singles from No Nukes
- 1. "Power" Released: 1980

Professional ratings
Review scores
| Source | Rating |
|---|---|
| AllMusic | link |
| Christgau's Record Guide | C+ |
| Rolling Stone Record Guide | (1983) |
| Rolling Stone | link (1997) |

No Nukes: The Muse Concerts For a Non-Nuclear Future was a 1979 triple live album that contained selections from the September 1979 Madison Square Garden concerts by the Musicians United for Safe Energy collective. Jackson Browne, Graham Nash, Bonnie Raitt, and John Hall were the key organizers of the event and guiding forces behind the album.

This was the first official appearance of Bruce Springsteen and the E Street Band's live act on record, and their "Detroit Medley", a staple of the encores of their regular shows, achieved considerable album-oriented rock airplay. In 2021, Springsteen officially released a compilation of songs he performed in his sets from the shows as the live album The Legendary 1979 No Nukes Concerts.

Otherwise the album did not get much radio attention, as many of the artists held back their best-known material from appearing on it or emphasized collaborative performances. The album was certified a gold record by the RIAA in September 1980. It was reissued as a two-CD set by Elektra Records in October 1997.

The No Nukes film was also released in May 1980 from this event, although it contained somewhat varying contents from this album.

== Controversy ==
A controversy sparked after the performance of Jamaican reggae singer Peter Tosh wearing Palestinian clothing (thawb and keffiyeh) and openly smoking marijuana. Tosh's appearance was considered a provocation towards the Jewish community in New York City, as the concerts took place during the Jewish New Year holiday. Despite his performance being advertised to appear in the accompanying film and on the triple live album, Tosh was removed from both releases.

== Track listing ==
=== Side 1 ===
1. "Dependin' on You" (Patrick Simmons, Michael McDonald) – The Doobie Brothers – 4:44
2. "Runaway" (Del Shannon, Max Crook) – Bonnie Raitt – 3:53
3. "Angel from Montgomery" (John Prine) – Bonnie Raitt – 3:48
4. "Plutonium Is Forever" (John & Johanna Hall) – John Hall – 3:22
5. "Power" (John & Johanna Hall) – The Doobie Brothers with John Hall and James Taylor – 5:23

=== Side 2 ===
1. "The Times They Are A-Changin'" (Bob Dylan) – James Taylor, Carly Simon and Graham Nash – 3:00
2. "Cathedral" (Graham Nash) – Graham Nash – 6:03
3. "The Crow on the Cradle" (Sydney Carter) – Jackson Browne and Graham Nash – 5:04
4. "Before the Deluge" (Jackson Browne) – Jackson Browne – 6:27

=== Side 3 ===
1. "Lotta Love" (Neil Young) – Nicolette Larson and The Doobie Brothers – 3:33
2. "Little Sister" (Doc Pomus, Mort Shuman) – Ry Cooder – 3:56
3. "A Woman" (Connie Brooks, Patricia Johnson) – Sweet Honey in the Rock – 1:28
4. "We Almost Lost Detroit" (Gil Scott-Heron) – Gil Scott-Heron – 4:44
5. "Get Together" (Chet Powers) – Jesse Colin Young – 4:52

=== Side 4 ===
1. "You Can't Change That" (Ray Parker Jr.) – Raydio – 3:33
2. "Once You Get Started" (Gavin Christopher) – Chaka Khan – 5:10
3. "Captain Jim's Drunken Dream" (James Taylor) – James Taylor – 4:19
4. "Honey Don't Leave L.A." (Danny Kortchmar) – James Taylor – 3:45
5. "Mockingbird" (Inez and Charlie Foxx) – James Taylor and Carly Simon – 3:57

=== Side 5 ===
1. "Heart of the Night" (Paul Cotton) – Poco – 6:09
2. "Cry to Me" (Bert Berns) – Tom Petty and the Heartbreakers – 3:30
3. "Stay" (Maurice Williams) – Bruce Springsteen & The E Street Band with Jackson Browne, Tom Petty and Rosemary Butler – 4:14
4. "Detroit Medley": "Devil with the Blue Dress" (Shorty Long, Mickey Stevenson), "Good Golly, Miss Molly" (Robert Blackwell, John Marascalco), "Jenny Take a Ride" (Enotris Johnson, Richard Penniman, Bob Crewe) – Bruce Springsteen & The E Street Band – 4:49

=== Side 6 ===
1. "You Don't Have to Cry" (Stephen Stills) – Crosby, Stills & Nash – 3:04
2. "Long Time Gone" (David Crosby) – Crosby, Stills & Nash – 5:23
3. "Teach Your Children" (Graham Nash) – Crosby, Stills & Nash – 3:05
4. "Takin' It to the Streets" (Michael McDonald) – The Doobie Brothers and James Taylor – 4:37

== Charts ==
| Chart (1980) | Peak position | Certification |
|---|---|---|
| Australia (Kent Music Report) | 18 | |
| Canada Album Charts | 53 | |
| New Zealand Album Charts | 35 | |
| Dutch Album Charts | 34 | |
| Norwegian Album Charts | 12 | |
| US Billboard Top LPs | 14 | US: Gold |

== Production credits ==
- Audio Recording: Record Plant NY Black Truck, Chief Engineer: David Hewitt
- Greg Ladanyi, Stanley Johnston, Dennis Kirk, Don Gooch, Jimmy Iovine - Engineers
- Joe Chiccarelli - Engineering
- Remote Crew: Phil Gitomer, Michael Guthrie, Dana Lester, Kooster McAllister, Paul Prestopino, David "DB" Brown, and John Venable

== Production crew ==
- John Badenhop
- Eric Barrett
- Tim Bernett
- David Bernstein
- Joel Bernstein
- Mark Brickman
- Rance Caldwell
- Bob Chirmside
- Rusty Conway
- Ivan Crews
- Joe Crowley
- Jim DeLuca
- Tony DeMattia
- Denny Densmore
- Chip Dox
- Pat Farrell
- David Faison
- Richard Fernandez
- Chuck Fitzpatrick
- Bill "Doc" Gans
- Glenn Goodwin
- Tom Hansen
- Denis Heron
- Armando Hurley
- Jeffrey Husband
- Grey Ingram
- Bruce Jackson
- Buford Jones
- Dennis Jones
- Phyllis Kaufman
- Leroy Kerr
- Edd Kolakowski
- Donnie Kretzschmar
- Lewis Lee
- Tom Littrell
- Clyde Llewellyn
- Robin Magruder
- Rob Marchner
- Jeff Mason
- Mary Newton
- Steve Nutting
- Alan Owen
- C.J.Patterson
- Steve Pearlman
- Ron Penny
- Bob Pope
- Dennis Scrimo
- B.J.Schiller
- Dixie Swanson
- George Van Ostrum
- Michael Valvano
- Larry Wallace
- Marty Woolf
- Joe Hill
