= Chapter and Verse (Bruce Springsteen album) =

Compilation album by Bruce Springsteen
- Released: September 23, 2016
- Recorded: 1966–2012
- Genre: Rock
- Length: 77:51
- Label: Columbia
- Producer: Bruce Springsteen

Bruce Springsteen chronology
The Ties That Bind: The River Collection (2015)	Chapter and Verse (2016)	Springsteen on Broadway (2018)

Bruce Springsteen and the E Street Band chronology
The Ties That Bind: The River Collection (2015)	Chapter and Verse (2016)	Letter to You (2020)

Chapter and Verse is a compilation album by Bruce Springsteen released on Sept. 23, 2016. The album is a companion piece to Springsteen's 500-plus-page autobiography, Born to Run, released four days later. The career-spanning album features 18 songs handpicked by Springsteen, five of which were previously unreleased. The album contains Springsteen's earliest recording from 1966 and late '60s/early '70s songs from his tenure in the Castiles, Steel Mill, and the Bruce Springsteen Band, along with his first 1972 demos for Columbia Records and songs from his studio albums from 1973 until 2012.

== Commercial performance ==
Chapter and Verse debuted at number five on the U.S. Billboard 200 with 29,000 units, including 27,000 traditional album sales.

Professional ratings
Aggregate scores
Source	Rating
Metacritic	78/100
Review scores
Source	Rating
AllMusic	3.5/5 stars
Consequence of Sound	B−
Drowned in Sound	8/10
The Independent	3/5 stars
Mojo	4/5 stars
Paste	8.0/10
Pitchfork	7.5/10
Rolling Stone	4.5/5 stars
Tiny Mix Tapes	4/5 stars
Uncut	8/10

== Track listing ==
All tracks are written by Bruce Springsteen, except where noted.

No.	Title	Writer(s)	Original album	Length
1.	"Baby I" (The Castiles)	Springsteen, George Theiss	Recorded at Mr. Music (Bricktown, NJ), May 18, 1966; previously unreleased	1:55
2.	"You Can't Judge a Book by the Cover" (The Castiles)	Willie Dixon	Recorded at The Left Foot (Freehold, NJ), September 16, 1967; previously unreleased	2:54
3.	"He's Guilty (The Judge Song)" (Steel Mill)		Recorded at Pacific Recording Studio (San Mateo, CA), February 22, 1970; previously unreleased	4:38
4.	"The Ballad of Jesse James" (The Bruce Springsteen Band)		Recorded at Challenger Eastern Surfboards (Highlands, NJ), March 14, 1972; previously unreleased	5:30
5.	"Henry Boy"		Recorded at Mediasound Studios (New York City), June 1972; previously unreleased	3:17
6.	"Growin' Up"		Recorded at Columbia Records Recording Studios (New York, NY), May 3, 1972; previously appeared on Tracks (1998) and 18 Tracks (1999)	2:42
7.	"4th of July, Asbury Park (Sandy)"		The Wild, the Innocent & the E Street Shuffle (1973)	5:34
8.	"Born to Run"		Born to Run (1975)	4:30
9.	"Badlands"		Darkness on the Edge of Town (1978)	4:01
10.	"The River"		The River (1980)	4:59
11.	"My Father's House"		Nebraska (1982)	5:03
12.	"Born in the U.S.A."		Born in the U.S.A. (1984)	4:37
13.	"Brilliant Disguise"		Tunnel of Love (1987)	4:14
14.	"Living Proof"		Lucky Town (1992)	4:44
15.	"The Ghost of Tom Joad"		The Ghost of Tom Joad (1995)	4:21
16.	"The Rising"		The Rising (2002)	4:47
17.	"Long Time Comin'"		Devils & Dust (2005)	4:13
18.	"Wrecking Ball"		Wrecking Ball (2012)	5:49
Total length:				77:48

== Personnel ==
Adapted from the album's liner notes:

Track 1

- Bruce Springsteen – vocal, guitar
- Curt Fluhr – bass
- Vinnie Manniello – drums
- Paul Popkin – tambourine, maracas, vocals
- George Theiss – guitar, vocals
- Bob Ludwig – mastering

Track 2

- Bruce Springsteen – vocal, guitar
- Bob Alfano – organ
- Curt Fluhr – bass
- Vinnie Manniello – drums
- Paul Popkin – tambourine, maracas, vocals
- George Theiss – guitar, vocals
- Bob Ludwig – mastering

Track 3

- Bruce Springsteen – vocal, guitar
- Danny Federici – organ, piano, backing vocals
- Vini Lopez – drums
- Vinnie Roslin – bass, backing vocals
- Bruce Springsteen – production
- Bob Ludwig – mastering

Track 4

- Bruce Springsteen – vocal, guitar
- Vini Lopez – drums
- David Sancious – piano, organ
- Garry Tallent – bass
- Stevie Van Zandt – guitar, backing vocals
- Bruce Springsteen – production
- Carl "Tinker" West – recording
- Bob Ludwig – mastering

Track 5

- Bruce Springsteen – vocal, guitar
- Bruce Springsteen, Mike Appel – production
- Harvey J. Goldberg – recording
- Bob Ludwig – mastering

Track 6

- Bruce Springsteen – vocal, guitar
- John Hammond – production
- S. Tonkel, Phil Giambalvo – recording
- Bob Ludwig – mastering

Track 7

- Bruce Springsteen – vocal, guitar
- Clarence Clemons – saxophone
- Suki Lahav – backing vocals
- Vini Lopez – drums
- David Sancious – piano, organ
- Garry Tallent – bass
- Mike Appel, Jim Cretecos – production
- Luis Lahav – recording, mixing
- Jack Ashkinazy – mastering

Track 8

- Bruce Springsteen – vocal, guitar
- Ernest "Boom" Carter – drums
- Clarence Clemons – saxophone
- Danny Federici – organ
- David Sancious – keyboards
- Garry Tallent – bass
- Bruce Springsteen, Mike Appel – production
- Luis Lahav – recording, mixing
- Greg Calbi – mastering

Track 9

- Bruce Springsteen – vocal, guitar
- Roy Bittan – piano
- Clarence Clemons – saxophone
- Danny Federici – organ
- Garry Tallent – bass
- Stevie Van Zandt – guitar
- Max Weinberg – drums
- Jon Landau, Bruce Springsteen – production
- Jimmy Iovine – recording
- Chuck Plotkin, Jimmy Iovine – mixing
- Mike Reese – mastering

Track 10

- Bruce Springsteen – vocal, guitar, harmonica
- Roy Bittan – piano
- Clarence Clemons – saxophone
- Danny Federici – organ
- Garry Tallent – bass
- Stevie Van Zandt – guitar, backing vocals
- Max Weinberg – drums
- Bruce Springsteen, Jon Landau, Stevie Van Zandt – production
- Neil Dorfsman – recording
- Chuck Plotkin, Toby Scott – mixing
- Ken Perry – mastering

Track 11

- Bruce Springsteen – vocal, guitar
- Bruce Springsteen – production
- Mike Batlan – recording
- Dennis King – mastering
- Bob Ludwig, Steve Marcussen – mastering consultants

Track 12

- Bruce Springsteen – vocal, guitar
- Roy Bittan – synthesizer
- Clarence Clemons – percussion
- Danny Federici – organ, piano, glockenspiel
- Garry Tallent – bass
- Stevie Van Zandt – guitar
- Max Weinberg – drums
- Bruce Springsteen, Jon Landau, Chuck Plotkin, Stevie Van Zandt – production
- Toby Scott – recording
- Bob Clearmountain – mixing
- Bob Ludwig – mastering

Track 13

- Bruce Springsteen – vocals, guitar, keyboards, bass
- Roy Bittan – piano
- Danny Federici – organ
- Max Weinberg – percussion
- Bruce Springsteen, Jon Landau, Chuck Plotkin – production
- Toby Scott – recording
- Bob Clearmountain – mixing
- Bob Ludwig – mastering

Track 14

- Bruce Springsteen – vocals, all instruments except keyboard and drums
- Roy Bittan – keyboards
- Gary Mallaber – drums
- Bruce Springsteen, Jon Landau, Chuck Plotkin – production
- Roy Bittan – additional production
- Toby Scott – recording
- Bob Clearmountain – mixing
- Bob Ludwig – mastering

Track 15

- Bruce Springsteen – vocal, guitar, harmonica
- Danny Federici – keyboard
- Gary Mallaber – drums
- Marty Rifkin – pedal steel guitar
- Garry Tallent – bass
- Bruce Springsteen, Chuck Plotkin – production
- Toby Scott – recording, mixing
- Dave Collins – mastering

Track 16

- Bruce Springsteen – vocals, guitar
- Roy Bittan – piano
- Clarence Clemons – saxophone, percussion
- Danny Federici – organ
- Nils Lofgren – guitar, backing vocals
- Patti Scialfa – backing vocals
- Garry Tallent – bass
- Stevie Van Zandt – guitar, backing vocals
- Max Weinberg – drums
- Jane Scarpantoni – cello
- Soozie Tyrell – violin, backing vocals
- Brendan O'Brien – production, mixing
- Nick DiDia – recording
- Bob Ludwig – mastering

Track 17

- Bruce Springsteen – vocals, guitar, keyboards
- Brendan O'Brien – bass
- Danny Federici – keyboards
- Steve Jordan – drums
- Marty Rifkin – pedal steel guitar
- Patti Scialfa – backing vocals
- Soozie Tyrell – violin, backing vocals
- Brendan O'Brien, Bruce Springsteen, Chuck Plotkin – production
- Toby Scott, Nick DiDia – recording
- Brendan O'Brien – mixing
- Bob Ludwig – mastering

Track 18

- Bruce Springsteen – vocals, guitar, percussion, keyboards
- Ron Aniello – guitar, bass, keyboards, drums, loops, backing vocals
- Max Weinberg – drums
- Charlie Giordano – piano, B-3 organ
- Rob Lebret – guitar, backing vocals
- Curt Ramm – trumpet
- Clarence Clemons – saxophone
- Soozie Tyrell – violin, backing vocals
- Patti Scialfa – backing vocals
- Lisa Lowell – backing vocals
- Ross Petersen – backing vocals
- Cliff Norrell – backing vocals
- NY String Chamber Consort
  - Rob Mathes – orchestration, conductor
- Ron Aniello, Bruce Springsteen – production
- Ross Petersen, Ron Aniello, Rob Lebret, Cliff Norrell, Toby Scott – recording
- Bob Clearmountain – mixing
- Bob Ludwig – mastering

Technical (all tracks)

- Bruce Springsteen – production
- Bob Ludwig – remastering
- Toby Scott – project supervisor
- Michelle Holme – art director
- Frank Stefanko – cover photography
- Joel Bernstein, Danny Clinch, Anton Corbijn, Peter Cunningham, David Gahr, Edward Gallucci, Roz Levin, Jo Lopez, Art Maillet, Eric Meola, Billy Smith Collection, Bruce Springsteen Collection, Pam Springsteen, Frank Stefanko – interior photography

== Charts and certifications ==
=== Weekly charts ===
Weekly chart performance for Chapter and Verse
Chart (2016)	Peak position
Australian Albums (ARIA)	2
Austrian Albums (Ö3 Austria)	2
Belgian Albums (Ultratop Flanders)	4
Belgian Albums (Ultratop Wallonia)	10
Canadian Albums (Billboard)	21
Danish Albums (Hitlisten)	10
Dutch Albums (Album Top 100)	5
Finnish Albums (Suomen virallinen lista)	11
French Albums (SNEP)	7
German Albums (Offizielle Top 100)	4
Greek Albums (IFPI Greece)	7
Irish Albums (IRMA)	2
Italian Albums (FIMI)	2
New Zealand Albums (RMNZ)	4
Norwegian Albums (VG-lista)	3
Portuguese Albums (AFP)	3
Scottish Albums (OCC)	1
Spanish Albums (PROMUSICAE)	4
Swedish Albums (Sverigetopplistan)	2
Swiss Albums (Schweizer Hitparade)	6
UK Albums (OCC)	2
US Billboard 200	5
US Top Rock Albums (Billboard)	1

=== Year-end charts ===
2016 year-end chart performance for Chapter and Verse
Chart (2016)	Position
Australian Albums (ARIA)	86
Belgian Albums (Ultratop Flanders)	59
Belgian Albums (Ultratop Wallonia)	121
Italian Albums (FIMI)	56
Spanish Albums (PROMUSICAE)	53
US Top Rock Albums (Billboard)	48

=== Certifications ===
Certifications and sales for Chapter and Verse
Region	Certification	Certified units/sales
Australia (ARIA)	Gold	35,000^{‡}
Italy (FIMI)	Gold	25,000^{*}
United Kingdom (BPI)	Silver	60,000^{‡}
^{*} Sales figures based on certification alone.^{‡} Sales+streaming figures based on certification alone.
