= The Castiles =

American rock band (1965–1968)

- Origin: Freehold, New Jersey
- Genres: Rock
- Years active: 1965–1968
- Past members: George Theiss; Bart Haynes; Paul Popkin; Frank Marziotti; Bruce Springsteen; Vinny Manneillo; Curt Fluhr; Bobby Alfano

The Castiles were an American rock band from Freehold, New Jersey. The band was formed by George Theiss in 1965, and Bruce Springsteen was a member. The Castiles recorded two songs and performed at various locations in New Jersey and New York before disbanding in 1968.

Springsteen went on to become one of the most well-known rock singers in history.

== History ==
In 1964, George Theiss saw the Beatles perform on The Ed Sullivan Show. He decided to form a band called the Sierras, with drummer Mike DeLuise on lead guitar, Vinnie Roslin on bass, and Bart Haynes on drums. They played a couple of gigs at the Elks Club. Theiss and Haynes reformed the band in May 1965 and called it the Castiles; the band was named after the shampoo brand Theiss was using at the time. Paul Popkin became the lead vocalist and Frank Marziotti played bass.

Theiss was romantically interested in Springsteen's sister, Virginia. When Theiss would go to her house, he would see Bruce playing guitar. In June 1965, Theiss asked Springsteen to join the Castiles as lead guitarist. They were students at Freehold High School at the time. "I was sitting in my South Street home one afternoon when a knock came at our front door," Springsteen wrote in his autobiography Born to Run. "It was George Theiss, a local guitarist and singer who’d heard through my sister that I played the guitar... He told me there was a band forming and they were looking for a lead guitarist. While I hesitated to call myself a lead guitarist, I had been hard at it for a while and worked up some very rudimentary 'chops.' We walked across town to Center Street and into a little half-shotgun house fifty feet up the block from where the metal-on-metal war of the rug mill spilled out open factory windows onto the streets of Texas. In Texas I'd slip on my guitar and join my first real band." "Texas" was the name of a neighborhood in Freehold.

In October 1965, Haynes joined the Marine Corps and was replaced on drums by Vinny Manneillo. Haynes fought in the Vietnam War, where he was killed in action on October 22, 1967. In February 1966, Marziotti left the band and Curt Fluhr became the bassist. Bobby Alfano played keyboards for the band in 1966 and 1967.

The Castiles practiced in half of a duplex home belonging to Haynes. Gordon "Tex" Vinyard lived in the other half of the two-family home, and he became the band's manager. They played gigs in local spots of Freehold including junior high school dances, roller rinks, drive-in theaters, and supermarket openings. They also played at clubs in the area and in Asbury Park, and they played at Cafe Wha? in Greenwich Village, New York City. The Castiles wore white pants, Beatle boots, and Beatle haircuts. The band performed covers of other bands' songs.

The Castiles played their last show in August 1968 at the Off Broad Street Coffeehouse in Red Bank, New Jersey. The band broke up after musical disagreements arose between Theiss and Springsteen.

=== Recordings ===
In May 1966, Vinyard paid for a demo record made at Mr. Music in Toms River, New Jersey. The songs on that demo record, "Baby I" and "That's What You Get", were both written by Theiss and Springsteen. The former was finally released in 2016 on the album Chapter and Verse, a companion album to Springsteen's Born to Run autobiography, along with a live recording of Willie Dixon's "You Can't Judge a Book by the Cover".

The Bruce Springsteen Story Vol. 1: The Castiles was released in 1993.

== Legacy ==
Theiss later played in other bands in Central New Jersey. Springsteen went on to become one of the most acclaimed rock singers in history.

Of his 2020 album, Letter to You, Springsteen has said that the music was inspired by Theiss' death in 2018. Two tracks from that album, "Ghosts" and "Last Man Standing", were written by Springsteen because he is the last living member of the Castiles. Two other tracks with the same theme, "I'll See You in My Dreams" and "One Minute You're Here", were also included. "The songs reminded me of a debt that I still owed to my Freehold brothers in arms," Springsteen said in the Thom Zimny-directed documentary, Bruce Springsteen's Letter to You, which aired on Apple TV+ in 2020. The film includes footage of Springsteen teaching his cousin to play the Castiles' song "Baby I".
