= The Legendary 1979 No Nukes Concerts =

2021 live album by Bruce Springsteen and the E Street Band

Live album by Bruce Springsteen and the E Street Band
- Released: November 19, 2021
- Recorded: September 21–22, 1979
- Venue: Madison Square Garden
- Genre: Rock
- Length: 90:12
- Label: Columbia
- Producer: Bruce Springsteen

Bruce Springsteen chronology
| Letter to You (2020) | The Legendary 1979 No Nukes Concerts (2021) | Only the Strong Survive (2022) |

Bruce Springsteen and the E Street Band chronology
| Letter to You (2020) | The Legendary 1979 No Nukes Concerts (2021) |

The Legendary 1979 No Nukes Concerts is a live album and concert film by Bruce Springsteen and the E Street Band, released on November 19, 2021. It was recorded over two nights, September 21 and 22, 1979, at Madison Square Garden, as part of the No Nukes concerts organized by activist group Musicians United for Safe Energy (MUSE) against the use of nuclear energy.

Most tracks are from Darkness on the Edge of Town (1978) and its predecessor, Born to Run (1975), while the album also includes performances of "The River" and "Sherry Darling" preceding their release in studio form on the following year's The River (1980). Springsteen's "Detroit Medley" and his cover of Maurice Williams and the Zodiacs' "Stay" were previously released in a different form on the 1980 album No Nukes: The Muse Concerts for a Non-Nuclear Future.

== Critical reception ==
Professional ratings
Aggregate scores
| Source | Rating |
|---|---|
| Metacritic | 93/100 |
Review scores
| Source | Rating |
| AllMusic | 4.5/5 stars |
| Classic Rock | 4/5 stars |
| Pitchfork | 9.0/10 |
| PopMatters | 10/10 |
| Under the Radar | 8.5/10 stars |

On review aggregator Metacritic, the album has a score of 93 out of 100 based on six critics' reviews, indicating "universal acclaim". Reviewing the album for Pitchfork, Stephen Thomas Erlewine said the audio recording and accompanying film "flesh out a pivotal moment in Springsteen's rise to superstardom, providing the first professionally recorded and filmed glimpse of the E Street Band at full roar", complimenting the set list for being "structured like a party" and concluding that Springsteen's other performances over the years "haven't diminished the power of this one: It has a distinctive blend of magic and might, the sound of a band who knows they've hit their stride and still gets giddy at the noise they make".

== Track listing ==
Tracks 1–5, 10 and 12 were recorded on September 22, 1979, while tracks 6–9, 11 and 13 were recorded on September 21, 1979. All tracks are written by Bruce Springsteen, except where noted.

The Legendary 1979 No Nukes Concerts track listing
| No. | Title | Writer(s) | Length |
|---|---|---|---|
| 1. | "Prove It All Night" | | 5:58 |
| 2. | "Badlands" | | 5:45 |
| 3. | "The Promised Land" | | 6:21 |
| 4. | "The River" | | 6:05 |
| 5. | "Sherry Darling" | | 6:11 |
| 6. | "Thunder Road" | | 5:26 |
| 7. | "Jungleland" | | 10:10 |
| 8. | "Rosalita (Come Out Tonight)" (with a snippet of "Stagger Lee" as introduction) | "Stagger Lee" by Lloyd Price, Harold Logan | 12:07 |
| 9. | "Born to Run" | | 4:59 |
| 10. | "Stay" | Maurice Williams | 4:28 |
| 11. | "Detroit Medley" (consisting of "Devil with the Blue Dress On", "Good Golly Miss Molly", "C.C. Rider" and "Jenny Take a Ride") | William Stevenson, Frederick Earl Long ("Devil with the Blue Dress On"); Robert Blackwell, John Marascalco ("Good Golly Miss Molly"); Traditional ("C.C. Rider"); Enotris Johnson, Richard Penniman, Robert Crewe ("Jenny Take a Ride") | 9:41 |
| 12. | "Quarter to Three" | Gene Barge, Frank Guida, Joseph Royster, Gary Anderson | 9:56 |
| 13. | "Rave On" | Sunny West, Bill Tilghman, Norman Petty | 2:57 |
| Total length: | | | 90:12 |

== Personnel ==
Musicians

- Bruce Springsteen – guitar, harmonica, vocals
- Roy Bittan – piano
- Clarence Clemons – tenor and baritone saxophones, percussion, backing vocal
- Danny Federici – organ, glockenspiel
- Garry Tallent – bass
- Stevie Van Zandt – guitar, backing vocal
- Max Weinberg – drums

Additional musicians on "Stay"

- Jackson Browne – co-lead vocal
- Tom Petty – co-lead vocal
- Rosemary Butler – backing vocal

Technical personnel

- Bruce Springsteen – production
- David Hewitt and crew – live recording
- Bob Clearmountain – mixing
- Brandon Duncan – assistant engineer, music editor
- Bob Ludwig – mastering
- Rob Lebret – sound engineer
- Shari Sutcliffe – music contractor
- Michelle Holme – art direction, design
- Joel Bernstein – front and back cover photography
- Richard E. Aaron, Joel Bernstein, David Gahr, Lawrence Kirsch, Peter Simon – all other photography

Film credits

- Bruce Springsteen – executive producer
- Jon Landau, Barbara Carr, Thom Zimmy – producers
- Bob Clearmountain – music mixing
- Thom Zimmy – editing
- Haskell Wexler – original cinematography

== Charts ==
=== Weekly charts ===
Weekly chart performance for The Legendary 1979 No Nukes Concerts
| Chart (2021) | Peak position |
|---|---|
| Australian Albums (ARIA) | 6 |
| Austrian Albums (Ö3 Austria) | 8 |
| Belgian Albums (Ultratop Flanders) | 5 |
| Belgian Albums (Ultratop Wallonia) | 24 |
| Canadian Albums (Billboard) | 38 |
| Danish Albums (Hitlisten) | 31 |
| Dutch Albums (Album Top 100) | 4 |
| Finnish Albums (Suomen virallinen lista) | 8 |
| French Albums (SNEP) | 28 |
| German Albums (Offizielle Top 100) | 7 |
| Irish Albums (OCC) | 10 |
| Italian Albums (FIMI) | 6 |
| New Zealand Albums (RMNZ) | 33 |
| Norwegian Albums (VG-lista) | 10 |
| Portuguese Albums (AFP) | 5 |
| Scottish Albums (OCC) | 6 |
| Spanish Albums (PROMUSICAE) | 3 |
| Swedish Albums (Sverigetopplistan) | 5 |
| Swiss Albums (Schweizer Hitparade) | 11 |
| UK Albums (OCC) | 11 |
| US Billboard 200 | 33 |
| US Top Rock Albums (Billboard) | 4 |

=== Year-end charts ===
Year-end chart performance for The Legendary 1979 No Nukes Concerts
| Chart (2021) | Position |
|---|---|
| Spanish Albums (PROMUSICAE) | 65 |
