= Best of Bruce Springsteen =

Greatest hits album by Bruce Springsteen
- Released: April 19, 2024
- Recorded: 1972–2019
- Length: 79:50 (CD and vinyl); 138:08 (digital)
- Label: Columbia
- Producers: Bruce Springsteen; Mike Appel; Jon Landau; Steven Van Zandt; Chuck Plotkin; Roy Bittan

Bruce Springsteen chronology
Only the Strong Survive (2022)	Best of Bruce Springsteen (2024)	Tracks II: The Lost Albums (2025)

Best of Bruce Springsteen is the eighth compilation album by American singer-songwriter Bruce Springsteen. It was released on April 19, 2024, through Columbia Records. The collection marks his first compilation in eight years and includes hit singles and popular album tracks from 1973 to 2020.

== Background ==
Best of Bruce Springsteen arrived in different variants, including a Jersey Devil vinyl variant through Amazon and an expanded 31-track download-only version. Physical editions contain 18 tracks. It includes previously unreleased liner notes by Springsteen archivist Erik Flannigan. The artwork of the collection depicts Springsteen in a black-and-white photo shot by Eric Meola during the Born to Run sessions.

== Track listing ==
All tracks are written by Bruce Springsteen.

Best of Bruce Springsteen CD and vinyl edition track listing
No.	Title	Original album	Length
1.	"Growin' Up"	Greetings from Asbury Park, N.J. (1973)	3:05
2.	"Rosalita (Come Out Tonight)"	The Wild, the Innocent & the E Street Shuffle (1973)	7:04
3.	"Born to Run"	Born to Run (1975)	4:30
4.	"Thunder Road"	Born to Run	4:49
5.	"Badlands"	Darkness on the Edge of Town (1978)	4:01
6.	"Hungry Heart"	The River (1980)	3:19
7.	"Atlantic City"	Nebraska (1982)	3:57
8.	"Dancing in the Dark"	Born in the U.S.A. (1984)	4:01
9.	"Born in the U.S.A."	Born in the U.S.A.	4:41
10.	"Brilliant Disguise"	Tunnel of Love (1987)	4:15
11.	"Human Touch" (edit)	Human Touch (1992)	5:10
12.	"Streets of Philadelphia"	Philadelphia Official Soundtrack (1994)	4:14
13.	"The Ghost of Tom Joad"	The Ghost of Tom Joad (1995)	4:21
14.	"Secret Garden"	Greatest Hits (1995)	4:27
15.	"The Rising"	The Rising (2002)	4:47
16.	"Girls in Their Summer Clothes"	Magic (2007)	4:19
17.	"Hello Sunshine"	Western Stars (2019)	3:55
18.	"Letter to You"	Letter to You (2020)	4:55
Total length:			79:50

Best of Bruce Springsteen digital edition track listing
No.	Title	Original album	Length
1.	"Growin' Up"	Greetings from Asbury Park, N.J. (1973)	3:05
2.	"Spirit in the Night"	Greetings from Asbury Park, N.J.	5:00
3.	"Rosalita (Come Out Tonight)"	The Wild, the Innocent & the E Street Shuffle (1973)	7:04
4.	"4th of July, Asbury Park (Sandy)"	The Wild, the Innocent & the E Street Shuffle	5:36
5.	"Born to Run"	Born to Run (1975)	4:30
6.	"Tenth Avenue Freeze-Out"	Born to Run	3:11
7.	"Thunder Road"	Born to Run	4:49
8.	"Badlands"	Darkness on the Edge of Town (1978)	4:01
9.	"Prove It All Night"	Darkness on the Edge of Town	3:57
10.	"The River"	The River (1980)	4:59
11.	"Hungry Heart"	The River	3:19
12.	"Atlantic City"	Nebraska (1982)	3:57
13.	"Glory Days"	Born in the U.S.A. (1984)	4:15
14.	"Dancing in the Dark"	Born in the U.S.A.	4:01
15.	"Born in the U.S.A."	Born in the U.S.A.	4:41
16.	"Brilliant Disguise"	Tunnel of Love (1987)	4:15
17.	"Tougher Than the Rest"	Tunnel of Love	4:35
18.	"Human Touch"	Human Touch (1992)	6:30
19.	"If I Should Fall Behind"	Lucky Town (1992)	2:57
20.	"Living Proof"	Lucky Town	4:45
21.	"Streets of Philadelphia"	Philadelphia Official Soundtrack (1994)	4:14
22.	"The Ghost of Tom Joad"	The Ghost of Tom Joad (1995)	4:21
23.	"Secret Garden"	Greatest Hits (1995)	4:27
24.	"The Rising"	The Rising (2002)	4:47
25.	"Long Time Comin'"	Devils & Dust (2005)	4:14
26.	"Girls in Their Summer Clothes"	Magic (2007)	4:19
27.	"The Wrestler"	Working on a Dream (2009)	3:49
28.	"We Take Care of Our Own"	Wrecking Ball (2012)	3:54
29.	"Hello Sunshine"	Western Stars (2019)	3:55
30.	"Ghosts"	Letter to You (2020)	5:55
31.	"Letter to You"	Letter to You	4:55
Total length:			138:08

== Charts ==
Chart performance for Best of Bruce Springsteen
Chart (2024–2026)	Peak position
Australian Albums (ARIA)	32
Austrian Albums (Ö3 Austria)	5
Belgian Albums (Ultratop Flanders)	7
Belgian Albums (Ultratop Wallonia)	8
Croatian International Albums (HDU)	14
Dutch Albums (Album Top 100)	12
French Albums (SNEP)	28
German Albums (Offizielle Top 100)	6
Greek Albums (IFPI)	63
Irish Albums (Official Charts)	3
Italian Albums (FIMI)	16
Japanese Albums (Oricon)	43
Japanese Hot Albums (Billboard Japan)	49
New Zealand Albums (RMNZ)	20
Portuguese Albums (AFP)	11
Scottish Albums (Official Charts)	8
Spanish Albums (Promusicae)	6
Swedish Albums (Sverigetopplistan)	23
Swiss Albums (Schweizer Hitparade)	8
UK Albums (Official Charts)	15
UK Americana Albums (Official Charts)	1
US Billboard 200	121
US Top Rock & Alternative Albums (Billboard)	27

== Certifications ==
Region	Certification	Certified units/sales
New Zealand (RMNZ)	Gold	7,500^{‡}
United Kingdom (BPI)	Silver	60,000^{‡}
^{‡} Sales+streaming figures based on certification alone.
