= Springsteen and E Street Band 2023–2025 Tour =

2023–25 concert tour by Bruce Springsteen and the E Street Band

Springsteen and the E Street Band 2023–25 Tour
- Tour by Bruce Springsteen and the E Street Band
- Location: Europe; North America
- Associated albums: Letter to You; Only the Strong Survive
- Start date: February 1, 2023
- End date: July 3, 2025
- No. of shows: 130
- Attendance: 4.9 million
- Box office: $729.7 million

Bruce Springsteen concert chronology
- Springsteen on Broadway (2017–2021); Springsteen and the E Street Band 2023–25 Tour (2023–2025); Land of Hope and Dreams American Tour (2026)

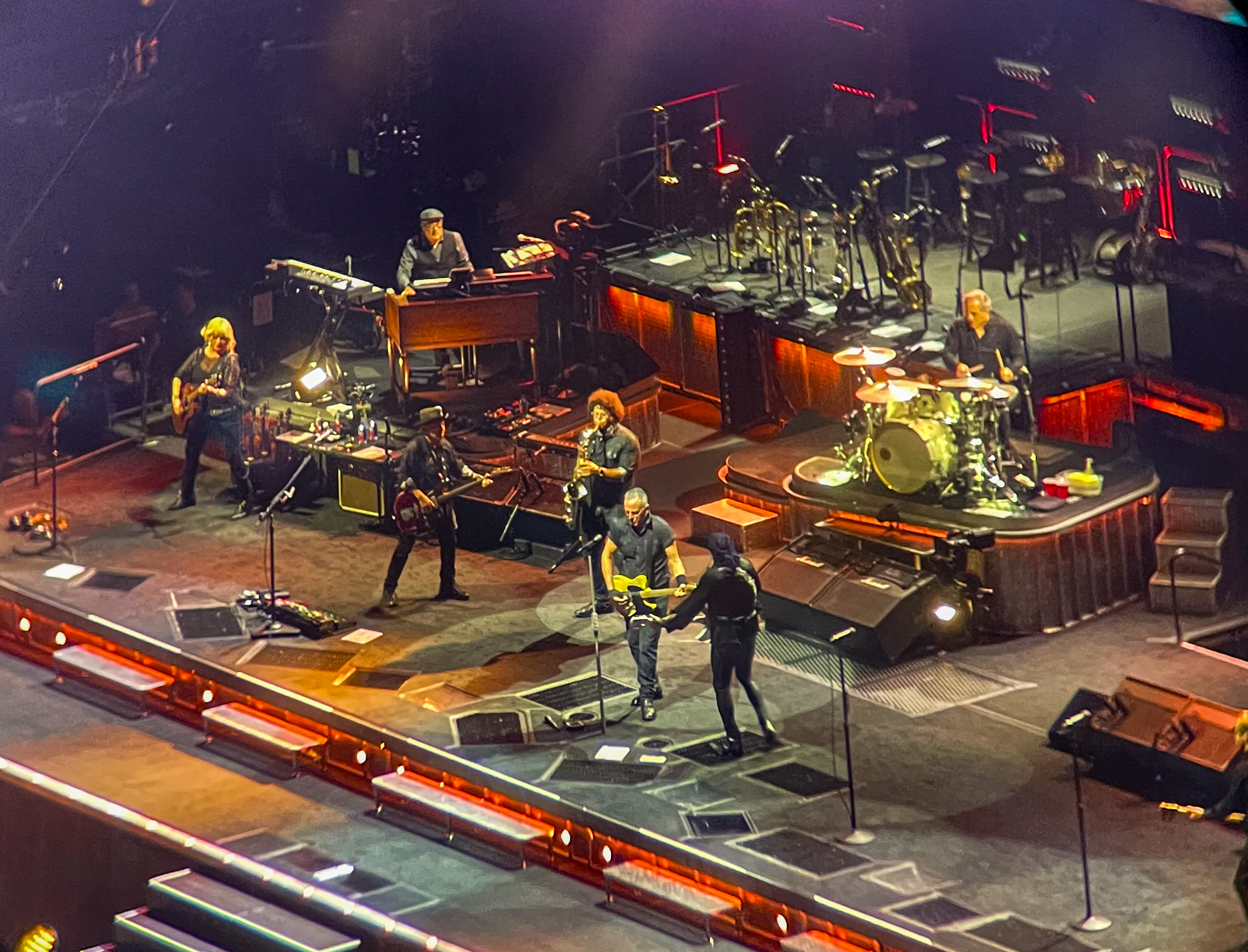
MetLife Stadium, September 3, 2023

The Bruce Springsteen and the E Street Band 2023–2025 Tour was a concert tour by American singer Bruce Springsteen and his backing band the E Street Band. The tour began on February 1, 2023, in Tampa, Florida. Due to band member illnesses and Springsteen suffering his own health issues, twenty-four dates of the tour's 2023 leg were postponed and were rescheduled for 2024. Springsteen re-titled the 2025 European leg as the "Land of Hope and Dreams Tour". It began on May 14 in Manchester and ended on July 3 in Milan.

The tour was Springsteen and the E Street Band's most successful tour ever, grossing $729.7 million from 4.9 million tickets sold in 129 reported dates. It ranked as one of the highest-grossing tours of all time. Springsteen became one of five artists to gross over $2.3 billion from touring in his career.

== Background ==
In 2019, following two years of performing solo shows on Broadway, Springsteen announced that he would tour with the E Street Band in 2020. The tour would have been in support of his 2020 album, Letter to You. Due to the COVID-19 pandemic, however, touring was put on hold until 2021. In January 2021, Springsteen again announced that, due to the ongoing pandemic, he would not tour with the E Street Band in 2021, although later that year he returned to Broadway for more solo shows.

On May 23, 2022, an upcoming tour was initially hinted with a short teaser displayed through Springsteen's social media accounts; the full announcement came the next day on his webpage. The tour commenced with dates in the U.S., starting in February 2023, and then visited Europe. The tour returned to North America in August 2023. The tour was scheduled to end in December 2023 until two August 2023 shows in Philadelphia were rescheduled for August 2024. All of the remaining shows on the tour from September to December were subsequently postponed until 2024.

== Absences and illness-related postponements ==
Early in the tour, the band was impacted by positive COVID-19 tests. Soozie Tyrell missed the shows in Hollywood and Dallas, marking the first time she missed a concert since joining the band in 2002. Guitarist Steven Van Zandt was also absent from the Dallas concert. On February 13, 2023, it was announced that guitarist Nils Lofgren had tested positive, and he was absent from the February 14th show in Houston. It was the first show Lofgren had missed since joining the E Street Band in 1984. Van Zandt and Tyrell returned to the tour in Houston. Lofgren returned to the tour on February 16 in Austin, but Jake Clemons missed the show, along with the February 18 show in Kansas City, due to testing positive. The shows on August 16 and 18 in Philadelphia were postponed due to Springsteen becoming ill at the last minute.

In September 2023, Springsteen announced the postponement of eight shows scheduled for dates between September 7 and 29, inclusive, because he was undergoing treatment for symptoms of peptic ulcer disease and that doctors recommended he not perform live. Springsteen's wife Patti Scialfa also urged Springsteen to postpone these dates to prevent "something worse" happening to him considering he already had battled COVID-19 a few times in 2023. A few weeks later, Springsteen announced the postponement of all remaining 2023 dates until 2024; he subsequently announced new dates between March and April 2024 and August to November 2024.

Prior to the tour resuming in March 2024, Springsteen in an interview with E Street Radio on SiriusXM, discussed his health issues and mentioned he had fears of never singing again. “I had the stomach problem and one of the big problems was I couldn't sing. You sing with your diaphragm. You know, my diaphragm was hurting so badly that when I went to make the effort to sing it was killing me. So I literally couldn't sing at all. That lasted for two or three months. During the course of it before people told me 'Oh, it's going to go away' and 'You're going to be OK.' ” Springsteen said. “You're thinking like, 'Hey, am I going to sing again?' This is one of one of the things I love to do the best, the most, and right now I can't do it. I found some great doctors and they straightened me out, and I can't do anything but thank them" Springsteen said.

On May 25, 2024, the band's show in Marseille was postponed at the last moment due to vocal issues Springsteen suffered. The following day, it was announced that the May 28, 2024, show in Prague and the June 1 and 3, 2024, dates in Milan were also postponed. A statement said that due to doctor's orders, Springsteen was advised to not perform for the next ten days and that the tour would resume on June 12, 2024. The rescheduled dates were announced for May, June, and July 2025.

During the August 23, 2024, rescheduled show in Philadelphia, Springsteen discussed his recent illness during the song "Growin' Up" by saying, "So there I was on the Jersey Shore. I think it was last summer because my belly was fucking killing me. Anything I did, my belly hurt. Trying to sing, my belly hurt. If I tried to play the guitar, my belly hurt. If I went to kiss my baby, my belly hurt! I was laying there thinking, fuck, I’d rather be in Philadelphia!" He also addressed rumors of a farewell tour, saying, "We ain’t doing no farewell tour bullshit. Jesus Christ, no farewell tour for the E Street Band! Hell no! Farewell to what? Thousands of people screaming your name? Yeah, I want to quit that!" The crowd responded with the chant, "Bruu-uuce!" to which Springsteen replied, "That’s it, that's all it takes. I ain’t going anywhere."

In June 2025, Steven Van Zandt was forced to miss the second show in San Sebastián and the show in Gelsenkirchen for what he assumed was food poisoning. He ended up needing emergency surgery in San Sebastián for what turned out to be appendicitis. The operation was a success.

== Ticket price backlash ==
Springsteen decided to use Ticketmaster's Verified Fan service for a majority of his North America tour dates to try and eliminate scalpers and bots on the secondary market from buying up tickets and selling them at much higher prices, a problem many of his previous tours have faced. Fans would need to be verified and sent a code, which they would receive in a text message the night before the on-sale date, for the show or shows they planned to attend. Not all fans were guaranteed to receive a code, however; some were placed on a waitlist. Tickets would go on sale at 10 am and once the Verified Fan window for ticket sales ended, which was normally at 3 pm, the remaining tickets would be released to the general public. The first tickets for the U.S. dates went on sale on July 20, 2022, and fans were instantly met with very high ticket prices, such as $4,000–5,000 for mid-range floor seats, and into the four figures for other, less desirable tickets. This was due to Ticketmaster's "dynamic pricing" program, in which "platinum tickets", which may be placed anywhere in the arena, from the front section to the back rows, fluctuate in price, in what is said to be ongoing reaction to demand. Some fans were able to buy tickets at face value as they went on sale; however, within minutes of tickets going on sale, the dynamic pricing kicked in and the tickets changed to the platinum tickets or were only available through the secondary market via Ticketmaster's resale program at much higher prices.

Complaints from outraged fans flooded social media and Springsteen-related message boards demanding that Springsteen and his management release a statement in response to this. Guitarist Steven Van Zandt has been the only member of the E Street Band to respond to the situation when he was asked about it on Twitter. He said, "I have nothing whatsoever to do with the price of tickets. Nothing. Nada. Niente. Bubkis. Dick." New Jersey congressman Bill Pascrell Jr., who has been a staunch ticket-industry critic, called out Ticketmaster for instituting a "market-based" pricing system that allows ticket costs to rise and fall based on demand. "When Yogi Berra said it's 'déjà vu all over again', he could have easily been talking about Ticketmaster and another unwelcome surprise for Springsteen fans. After the long hiatus, we are all excited that Bruce is going back in tour. But Americans have the right to enjoy some live entertainment without getting ripped off. Ticketmaster sees popular events as an opportunity to soak regular Americans," the lawmaker said in a statement.

Tickets for Springsteen's shows in the UK sold out in under 8 hours, but many UK fans took to social media complaining about the same issues fans in the U.S. faced.

On July 24, 2022, Ticketmaster issued a response defending their controversial "dynamic pricing" plan, saying that 88.2% of tickets were sold at fixed prices that ranged from $59.50 to $399 before added service fees and that the average price of all tickets sold so far is $262, with 56% being sold for under $200 face value. Ticketmaster did not dispute reports of tickets being priced through the platinum program for as high as $4–5,000. Ticketmaster is claiming that only 1.3% of total tickets so far have gone for more than $1,000. Ticketmaster further broke down the percentages on the 56% of tickets it says were sold for under $200. It said that 18% were sold under $99, 27% went for between $100–$150, and 11% sold for between $150–$200. "Prices and formats are consistent with industry standards for top performers," the company said in their statement.

On July 26, 2022, six days after tickets went on sale in North America, Springsteen's manager Jon Landau issued a statement to The New York Times defending the price of tickets, saying, "In pricing tickets for this tour, we looked carefully at what our peers have been doing. We chose prices that are lower than some and on par with others. Regardless of the commentary about a modest number of tickets costing $1,000 or more, our true average ticket price has been in the mid-$200 range. I believe that in today's environment, that is a fair price to see someone universally regarded as among the very greatest artists of his generation."

== Ferrara concert controversy ==
On May 18, 2023, Springsteen and the E Street Band were set to perform at the Giorgio Bassani Urban Park in Ferrara, Italy, as part of the tour's European leg. However, in the immediate aftermath of the floods that hit several areas of the Emilia-Romagna region, fans and ticketholders used social media to urge the organizers to reschedule the concert, in order to pay respect to the victims and avoid misplacement of emergency resources. After further examinations, both the Prefettura and the local council of Ferrara authorized Springsteen to go ahead with the concert.

The decision sparked heavy criticism towards Springsteen and his team, while both lead promoter Claudio Trotta and mayor of Ferrara, Alan Fabbri, defended the decision to permit the show. Deputy vice-president of Protezione Civile for Emilia-Romagna, Irene Priolo, also questioned the decision, while clarifying that Ferrara's local authorities were the only institutions that had the right to either confirm or postpone the concert.

During the concert, which reportedly involved 900 security members between police officers, volunteers, and first aid services, Springsteen did not make any direct comments about the floods and their impact. Fans also complained about the muddy conditions of the park's terrain, as well as logistical difficulties.

On May 26, Springsteen's guitarist Steven Van Zandt took to Twitter to answer a message from an Italian fan, who had asked him if the band really was not informed of the emergency, writing: "We didn't know a thing about it. All we heard was the crew had to work overtime because the venue was one big mud hole from the rain. That was all."

== Recordings ==
All shows were professionally recorded and released on live.brucespringsteen.net. Many have been featured on E Street Radio.

== Road Diary: Bruce Springsteen and the E Street Band ==
In October 2024, Disney+ and Hulu aired the documentary Road Diary: Bruce Springsteen and The E Street Band that will document their 2023–24 tour featuring footage from band rehearsals and backstage moments, conversations with Springsteen as he develops the setlist, and archival clips of the E Street Band. The documentary was first screened at the Toronto International Film Festival in September 2024 with Springsteen appearing at the festival.

== Criticism of President Trump ==
During his show in Manchester on May 14, 2025, Springsteen spoke out against President Donald Trump and called his administration "corrupt, incompetent, and treasonous". Two days later, Trump responded on Truth Social by calling Springsteen "highly overrated" and "dumb as a rock". The president of the American Federation of Musicians defended Springsteen, saying, "Musicians have the right to freedom of expression, and we stand in solidarity with all our members." On May 19, Trump called for a major investigation into Springsteen, Beyoncé, Oprah, and other celebrities for their endorsement of Kamala Harris. He claims that Harris illegally paid them to support her 2024 campaign for president. Various musicians including Neil Young and Eddie Vedder spoke out in defense of Springsteen's comments and his freedom of speech being violated.

On May 21, 2025, Springsteen released the Land of Hope & Dreams EP. The EP features four songs from the tour opener in Manchester and Springsteen's speeches about President Trump that drew backlash from the President.

== Set list ==
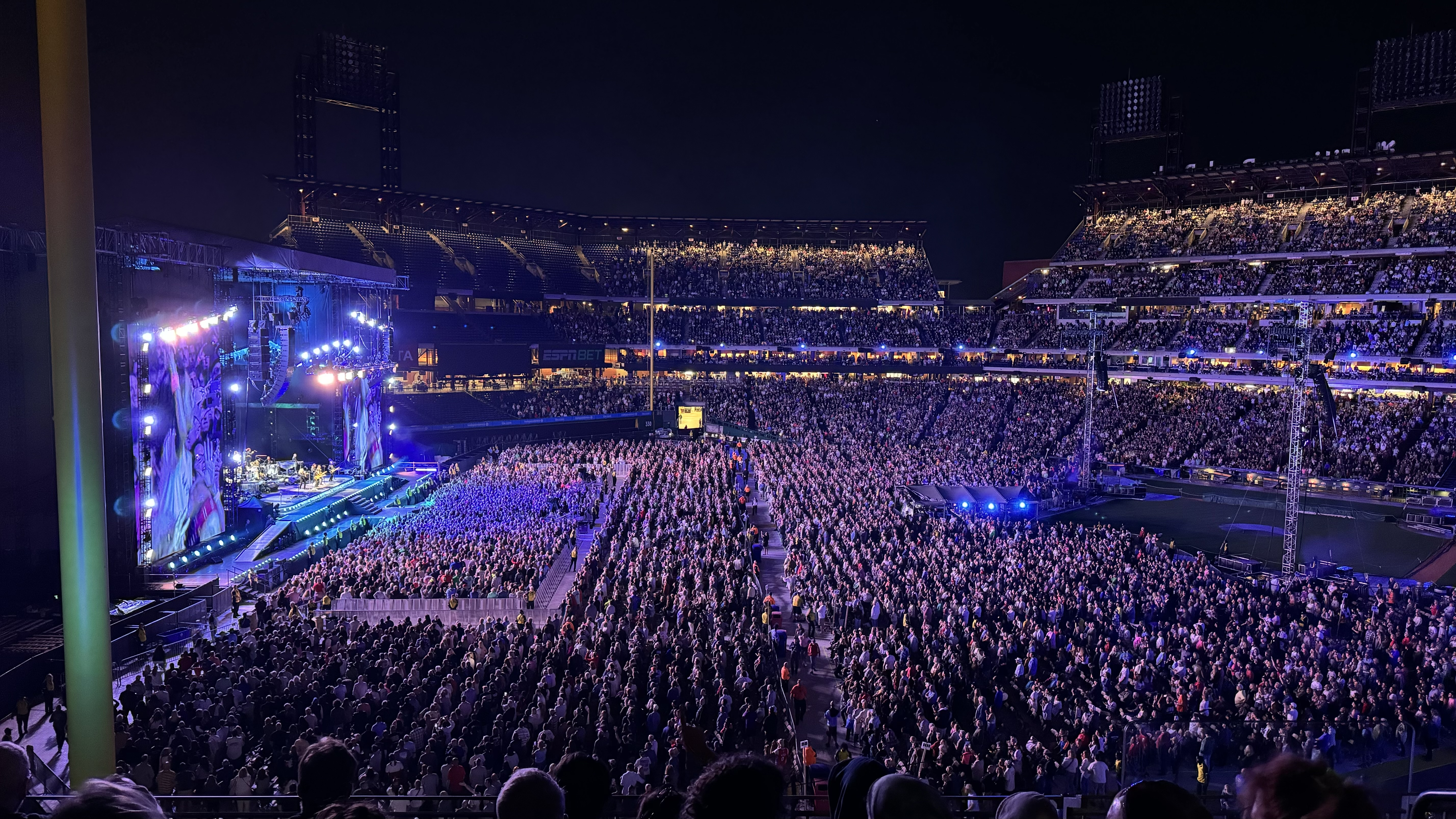
Citizens Bank Park, August 21, 2024

This set list reflects the tour's opening night in Tampa on February 1, 2023, and is not intended to represent the majority of the performances throughout the tour. This tour has seen the live debut of songs from Springsteen's 2020 album, Letter to You, and the first live performances with the E Street Band of songs from his 2022 album, Only the Strong Survive.

1. "No Surrender"
2. "Ghosts"
3. "Prove It All Night"
4. "Letter to You"
5. "The Promised Land"
6. "Out in the Street"
7. "Candy's Room"
8. "Kitty's Back"
9. "Brilliant Disguise"
10. "Nightshift"
11. "Don't Play that Song"
12. "The E Street Shuffle"
13. "Johnny 99"
14. "Last Man Standing"
15. "House of a Thousand Guitars"
16. "Backstreets"
17. "Because the Night"
18. "She's the One"
19. "Wrecking Ball"
20. "The Rising"
21. "Badlands"
  Encore
22. "Burning Train"
23. "Born to Run"
24. "Rosalita (Come Out Tonight)"
25. "Glory Days"
26. "Dancing in the Dark"
27. "Tenth Avenue Freeze-Out"
28. "I'll See You in My Dreams"

=== Set list complaints ===
Some fans had criticized the initial 2023 legs of the tour for the set list being very similar each night, something that Springsteen has not been known for throughout his career, and have complained about the number of songs being performed. In an interview, Steven Van Zandt responded to fan criticism by saying, "I had to let that guy have it the other day. He's like, '(whining) Jeez, you started out playing 28 songs and now you're playing 26. I want my money back.' Get the beep outta here! Anybody measuring the show by the amount of songs or the amount of time spent onstage ain't listening! This ain't about numbers — it's about an emotional experience. And this one happens to be ... I think, a special one. And the audiences are reacting in a way I've never seen in America. It's like a Broadway show. Why? Because you're telling a story and every song has a purpose." In July 2023, Garry Tallent also responded to fan complaints about the set list. "These rinse and repeat shows are such the opposite of greatness," a fan on social media said. Tallent replied, "You are fucking kidding, right??" Former E Street Band drummer Vini Lopez added, "As time goes on, they'll start doing other stuff and that just goes on through a tour. The thing that bugs me the most about the tour are the people who go to 20 shows and then they complain about hearing the same songs."

In March 2024, during an interview with E Street Radio, Springsteen said fans could expect a wider selection of songs after the tour resumed that month. "I think we're approaching [the 2024 World Tour] like it's a new tour. There will be some things from last year's tour that will hold over; some of my basic themes of mortality and life. Those things I'm gonna keep set, but I think I'm gonna move around the other parts of the set a lot more. So there'll be a much wider song selection going on. We're looking at it like it's a little bit of the old tour, but we're looking at it like a new tour. We're looking to kill the crowd and send them home just having had the time of their lives and that hasn't changed and that's what we plan to be doing for the rest of this tour", Springsteen said.

== Tour dates ==
List of 2023 concerts, showing date, city, country, and venue
| Date (2023) | City | Country | Venue | Attendance | Revenue |
|---|---|---|---|---|---|
| February 1 | Tampa | United States | Amalie Arena | 17,848 / 17,848 | $4,048,983 |
| February 3 | Atlanta | United States | State Farm Arena | 14,326 / 14,326 | $3,953,834 |
| February 5 | Orlando | United States | Amway Center | 16,117 / 16,117 | $3,325,983 |
| February 7 | Hollywood | United States | Hard Rock Live | 6,750 / 6,750 | $3,103,298 |
| February 10 | Dallas | United States | American Airlines Center | 16,324 / 16,324 | $4,750,182 |
| February 14 | Houston | United States | Toyota Center | 15,087 / 15,087 | $3,649,127 |
| February 16 | Austin | United States | Moody Center | 13,527 / 13,527 | $3,810,405 |
| February 18 | Kansas City | United States | T-Mobile Center | 16,764 / 16,764 | $3,896,347 |
| February 21 | Tulsa | United States | BOK Center | 14,971 / 14,971 | $3,716,493 |
| February 25 | Portland | United States | Moda Center | 16,979 / 16,979 | $4,132,851 |
| February 27 | Seattle | United States | Climate Pledge Arena | 15,774 / 15,774 | $4,411,833 |
| March 2 | Denver | United States | Ball Arena | 16,520 / 16,520 | $3,830,239 |
| March 5 | Saint Paul | United States | Xcel Energy Center | 17,643 / 17,643 | $4,719,041 |
| March 7 | Milwaukee | United States | Fiserv Forum | 15,094 / 15,094 | $4,210,482 |
| March 16 | Philadelphia | United States | Wells Fargo Center | 18,177 / 18,177 | $4,655,381 |
| March 18 | University Park | United States | Bryce Jordan Center | 14,589 / 14,589 | $3,417,865 |
| March 20 | Boston | United States | TD Garden | 17,033 / 17,033 | $4,978,145 |
| March 23 | Buffalo | United States | KeyBank Center | 17,338 / 17,338 | $4,385,012 |
| March 25 | Greensboro | United States | Greensboro Coliseum | 19,453 / 19,453 | $4,710,944 |
| March 27 | Washington, D.C. | United States | Capital One Arena | 18,173 / 18,173 | $4,893,183 |
| March 29 | Detroit | United States | Little Caesars Arena | 19,307 / 19,307 | $4,927,548 |
| April 1 | New York City | United States | Madison Square Garden | 18,718 / 18,718 | $5,233,194 |
| April 3 | Brooklyn | United States | Barclays Center | 16,605 / 16,605 | $4,940,042 |
| April 5 | Cleveland | United States | Rocket Mortgage FieldHouse | 17,804 / 17,804 | $3,917,534 |
| April 7 | Baltimore | United States | CFG Bank Arena | 12,236 / 12,236 | $3,489,147 |
| April 9 | Elmont | United States | UBS Arena | 32,704 / 32,704 | $9,618,310 |
| April 11 | Elmont | United States | UBS Arena | 32,704 / 32,704 | $9,618,310 |
| April 14 | Newark | United States | Prudential Center | 16,530 / 16,530 | $4,425,991 |
| April 28 | Barcelona | Spain | Estadi Olímpic Lluís Companys | 114,046 / 114,046 | $12,105,824 |
| April 30 | Barcelona | Spain | Estadi Olímpic Lluís Companys | 114,046 / 114,046 | $12,105,824 |
| May 5 | Dublin | Ireland | RDS Arena | 116,432 / 116,432 | $16,945,769 |
| May 7 | Dublin | Ireland | RDS Arena | 116,432 / 116,432 | $16,945,769 |
| May 9 | Dublin | Ireland | RDS Arena | 116,432 / 116,432 | $16,945,769 |
| May 13 | Nanterre | France | Paris La Défense Arena | 76,239 / 76,239 | $8,361,044 |
| May 15 | Nanterre | France | Paris La Défense Arena | 76,239 / 76,239 | $8,361,044 |
| May 18 | Ferrara | Italy | Parco Urbano G. Bassani | 49,188 / 49,188 | $5,585,913 |
| May 21 | Rome | Italy | Circo Massimo | 59,003 / 59,003 | $6,552,603 |
| May 25 | Amsterdam | Netherlands | Johan Cruyff Arena | 108,828 / 108,828 | $11,845,874 |
| May 27 | Amsterdam | Netherlands | Johan Cruyff Arena | 108,828 / 108,828 | $11,845,874 |
| May 30 | Edinburgh | Scotland | BT Murrayfield Stadium | 63,163 / 63,163 | $8,167,379 |
| June 11 | Landgraaf | Netherlands | Megaland | 65,001 / 65,001 | $6,566,054 |
| June 13 | Zürich | Switzerland | Letzigrund | 48,416 / 48,416 | $7,307,379 |
| June 16 | Birmingham | England | Villa Park | 43,959 / 43,959 | $6,303,877 |
| June 18 (Note: The June 18, 2023, concert in Werchter is part of TW Classic.) | Werchter | Belgium | Werchter Festival Ground | 59,356 / 59,356 | $7,328,092 |
| June 21 | Düsseldorf | Germany | Merkur Spiel-Arena | 44,441 / 44,441 | $5,404,488 |
| June 24 | Gothenburg | Sweden | Ullevi | 192,423 / 192,423 | $15,594,120 |
| June 26 | Gothenburg | Sweden | Ullevi | 192,423 / 192,423 | $15,594,120 |
| June 28 | Gothenburg | Sweden | Ullevi | 192,423 / 192,423 | $15,594,120 |
| June 30 | Oslo | Norway | Voldsløkka | 99,951 / 99,951 | $8,772,719 |
| July 2 | Oslo | Norway | Voldsløkka | 99,951 / 99,951 | $8,772,719 |
| July 6 (Note: The July 6 and 8, 2023, concerts at Hyde Park are part of BST Hyde Park.) | London | England | Hyde Park | 130,794 / 130,794 | $23,283,673 |
| July 8 | London | England | Hyde Park | 130,794 / 130,794 | $23,283,673 |
| July 11 | Copenhagen | Denmark | Parken Stadium | 101,628 / 101,628 | $11,336,642 |
| July 13 | Copenhagen | Denmark | Parken Stadium | 101,628 / 101,628 | $11,336,642 |
| July 15 | Hamburg | Germany | Volksparkstadion | 46,939 / 46,939 | $5,395,930 |
| July 18 | Vienna | Austria | Ernst-Happel-Stadion | 57,270 / 57,270 | $6,496,350 |
| July 21 | Hockenheim | Germany | Hockenheimring | 76,279 / 76,279 | $8,586,727 |
| July 23 | Munich | Germany | Olympiastadion | 68,109 / 68,109 | $8,110,796 |
| July 25 | Monza | Italy | Autodromo Nazionale di Monza | 70,942 / 70,942 | $7,654,642 |
| August 9 | Chicago | United States | Wrigley Field | 81,351 / 81,351 | $13,757,764 |
| August 11 | Chicago | United States | Wrigley Field | 81,351 / 81,351 | $13,757,764 |
| August 24 | Foxborough | United States | Gillette Stadium | 82,955 / 82,955 | $13,893,960 |
| August 26 | Foxborough | United States | Gillette Stadium | 82,955 / 82,955 | $13,893,960 |
| August 30 | East Rutherford | United States | MetLife Stadium | 152,540 / 152,540 | $25,809,253 |
| September 1 | East Rutherford | United States | MetLife Stadium | 152,540 / 152,540 | $25,809,253 |
| September 3 | East Rutherford | United States | MetLife Stadium | 152,540 / 152,540 | $25,809,253 |

List of 2024 concerts, showing date, city, country, and venue
| Date (2024) | City | Country | Venue | Attendance | Revenue |
|---|---|---|---|---|---|
| March 19 | Phoenix | United States | Footprint Center | 15,258 / 15,258 | $3,859,126 |
| March 22 | Las Vegas | United States | T-Mobile Arena | 17,319 / 17,319 | $3,946,485 |
| March 25 | San Diego | United States | Pechanga Arena | 13,917 / 13,917 | $3,263,991 |
| March 28 | San Francisco | United States | Chase Center | 32,711 / 32,711 | $8,992,333 |
| March 31 | San Francisco | United States | Chase Center | 32,711 / 32,711 | $8,992,333 |
| April 4 | Inglewood | United States | Kia Forum | 33,588 / 33,588 | $7,925,926 |
| April 7 | Inglewood | United States | Kia Forum | 33,588 / 33,588 | $7,925,926 |
| April 12 | Uncasville | United States | Mohegan Sun Arena | 8,650 / 8,650 | $3,582,945 |
| April 15 | Albany | United States | MVP Arena | 14,349 / 14,349 | $3,263,505 |
| April 18 | Syracuse | United States | JMA Wireless Dome | 28,695 / 28,695 | $4,400,352 |
| April 21 | Columbus | United States | Nationwide Arena | 18,214 / 18,214 | $3,759,160 |
| May 5 | Cardiff | Wales | Principality Stadium | 57,494 / 57,494 | $9,845,370 |
| May 9 | Belfast | Northern Ireland | Boucher Road | 41,000 / 41,000 | $6,244,701 |
| May 12 | Kilkenny | Ireland | Nowlan Park | 30,369 / 30,369 | $4,692,146 |
| May 16 | Cork | Ireland | Páirc Uí Chaoimh | 41,784 / 41,784 | $6,447,932 |
| May 19 | Dublin | Ireland | Croke Park | 78,109 / 78,109 | $12,647,526 |
| May 22 | Sunderland | England | Stadium of Light | 45,775 / 45,775 | $7,915,946 |
| June 12 | Madrid | Spain | Metropolitano Stadium | 161,379 / 161,379 | $16,961,637 |
| June 14 | Madrid | Spain | Metropolitano Stadium | 161,379 / 161,379 | $16,961,637 |
| June 17 | Madrid | Spain | Metropolitano Stadium | 161,379 / 161,379 | $16,961,637 |
| June 20 | Barcelona | Spain | Estadi Olímpic Lluís Companys | 115,504 / 115,504 | $12,058,843 |
| June 22 | Barcelona | Spain | Estadi Olímpic Lluís Companys | 115,504 / 115,504 | $12,058,843 |
| June 27 | Nijmegen | Netherlands | Goffertpark | 129,962 / 129,962 | $16,235,043 |
| June 29 | Nijmegen | Netherlands | Goffertpark | 129,962 / 129,962 | $16,235,043 |
| July 2 | Werchter | Belgium | Werchter Park | 54,961 / 54,961 | $8,042,569 |
| July 5 | Hannover | Germany | Heinz von Heiden Arena | 43,305 / 43,305 | $6,301,145 |
| July 9 | Odense | Denmark | Dyrskuepladsen | 53,016 / 53,016 | $6,786,669 |
| July 12 | Helsinki | Finland | Olympiastadion | 41,808 / 41,808 | $4,947,095 |
| July 15 | Stockholm | Sweden | Friends Arena | 108,202 / 108,202 | $9,667,925 |
| July 18 | Stockholm | Sweden | Friends Arena | 108,202 / 108,202 | $9,667,925 |
| July 21 | Bergen | Norway | Dokken | 45,000 / 45,000 | $4,397,638 |
| July 25 | London | England | Wembley Stadium | 153,904 / 153,904 | $25,259,232 |
| July 27 | London | England | Wembley Stadium | 153,904 / 153,904 | $25,259,232 |
| August 15 | Pittsburgh | United States | PPG Paints Arena | 34,406 / 34,406 | $6,795,183 |
| August 18 | Pittsburgh | United States | PPG Paints Arena | 34,406 / 34,406 | $6,795,183 |
| August 21 | Philadelphia | United States | Citizens Bank Park | 81,530 / 81,530 | $13,714,665 |
| August 23 | Philadelphia | United States | Citizens Bank Park | 81,530 / 81,530 | $13,714,665 |
| September 7 | Washington, D.C. | United States | Nationals Park | 39,765 / 39,765 | $7,052,608 |
| September 13 | Baltimore | United States | Oriole Park at Camden Yards | 39,646 / 39,646 | $6,556,587 |
| September 15 (Note: The September 15, 2024, concert in Asbury Park is part of the Sea.Hear.Now Festival.) | Asbury Park | United States | North Beach | —N/a | —N/a |
| October 31 | Montreal | Canada | Bell Centre | 20,002/ 20,002 | $3,433,596 |
| November 3 | Toronto | Canada | Scotiabank Arena | 35,773 / 35,773 | $6,588,684 |
| November 6 | Toronto | Canada | Scotiabank Arena | 35,773 / 35,773 | $6,588,684 |
| November 9 | Ottawa | Canada | Canadian Tire Centre | 17,023 / 17,023 | $2,879,481 |
| November 13 | Winnipeg | Canada | Canada Life Centre | 15,189 / 15,189 | $2,778,662 |
| November 16 | Calgary | Canada | Scotiabank Saddledome | 16,531 / 16,531 | $2,603,586 |
| November 19 | Edmonton | Canada | Rogers Place | 17,037 / 17,037 | $2,899,168 |
| November 22 | Vancouver | Canada | Rogers Arena | 17,502 / 17,502 | $3,306,975 |

List of 2025 concerts, showing date, city, country, and venue
| Date (2025) | City | Country | Venue | Attendance | Revenue |
|---|---|---|---|---|---|
| May 14 | Manchester | England | Co-op Live | 52,844 / 52,844 | $9,473,322 |
| May 17 | Manchester | England | Co-op Live | 52,844 / 52,844 | $9,473,322 |
| May 20 | Manchester | England | Co-op Live | 52,844 / 52,844 | $9,473,322 |
| May 24 | Lille | France | Decathlon Arena | 86,067 / 86,067 | $11,432,256 |
| May 27 | Lille | France | Decathlon Arena | 86,067 / 86,067 | $11,432,256 |
| May 31 | Marseille | France | Orange Vélodrome | 60,846 / 60,846 | $8,356,441 |
| June 4 | Liverpool | England | Anfield | 91,544 / 91,544 | $16,154,139 |
| June 7 | Liverpool | England | Anfield | 91,544 / 91,544 | $16,154,139 |
| June 11 | Berlin | Germany | Olympiastadion | 67,210 / 67,210 | $9,554,677 |
| June 15 | Prague | Czech Republic | Letňany | 62,541 / 62,541 | $7,210,131 |
| June 18 | Frankfurt | Germany | Deutsche Bank Park | 44,047 / 44,047 | $6,098,769 |
| June 21 | San Sebastián | Spain | Anoeta Stadium | 77,865 / 77,865 | $9,711,461 |
| June 24 | San Sebastián | Spain | Anoeta Stadium | 77,865 / 77,865 | $9,711,461 |
| June 27 | Gelsenkirchen | Germany | Veltins-Arena | 50,448 / 50,448 | $7,383,241 |
| June 30 | Milan | Italy | San Siro | 114,158 / 114,158 | $13,253,810 |
| July 3 | Milan | Italy | San Siro | 114,158 / 114,158 | $13,253,810 |
| Total | | | | 4,887,348 / 4,887,348 (100%) | $729,693,489 |

== Postponed dates ==
| Date | City | Country | Venue | Reason |
|---|---|---|---|---|
| March 9, 2023 (Note: Rescheduled for September 21, 2023.) | Columbus | United States | Nationwide Arena | Illness |
| March 12, 2023 (Note: Rescheduled for September 16, 2023.) | Uncasville | United States | Mohegan Sun Arena | Illness |
| March 14, 2023 (Note: Rescheduled for September 19, 2023.) | Albany | United States | MVP Arena | Illness |
| August 16, 2023 (Note: Rescheduled for August 21, 2024.) | Philadelphia | United States | Citizens Bank Park | Illness |
| August 18, 2023 (Note: Rescheduled for August 23, 2024.) | Philadelphia | United States | Citizens Bank Park | Illness |
| August 28, 2023 (Note: Initially rescheduled for September 29, 2023, before being postponed again due to Springsteen's illness.) | Washington, D.C. | United States | Nationals Park | Undisclosed |
| September 7, 2023 (Note: Rescheduled for April 18, 2024.) | Syracuse | United States | JMA Wireless Dome | Illness |
| September 9, 2023 (Note: Rescheduled for September 13, 2024.) | Baltimore | United States | Oriole Park at Camden Yards | Illness |
| September 12, 2023 (Note: Rescheduled for August 15, 2024.) | Pittsburgh | United States | PPG Paints Arena | Illness |
| September 14, 2023 (Note: Rescheduled for August 18, 2024.) | Pittsburgh | United States | PPG Paints Arena | Illness |
| September 16, 2023 (Note: Rescheduled for April 12, 2024.) | Uncasville | United States | Mohegan Sun Arena | Illness |
| September 19, 2023 (Note: Rescheduled for April 15, 2024.) | Albany | United States | MVP Arena | Illness |
| September 21, 2023 (Note: Rescheduled for April 21, 2024.) | Columbus | United States | Nationwide Arena | Illness |
| September 29, 2023 (Note: Rescheduled for September 7, 2024.) | Washington, D.C. | United States | Nationals Park | Illness |
| November 3, 2023 (Note: Rescheduled for November 22, 2024.) | Vancouver | Canada | Rogers Arena | Illness |
| November 6, 2023 (Note: Rescheduled for November 19, 2024.) | Edmonton | Canada | Rogers Place | Illness |
| November 8, 2023 (Note: Rescheduled for November 16, 2024.) | Calgary | Canada | Scotiabank Saddledome | Illness |
| November 10, 2023 (Note: Rescheduled for November 13, 2024.) | Winnipeg | Canada | Canada Life Centre | Illness |
| November 14, 2023 (Note: Rescheduled for November 3, 2024.) | Toronto | Canada | Scotiabank Arena | Illness |
| November 16, 2023 (Note: Rescheduled for November 6, 2024.) | Toronto | Canada | Scotiabank Arena | Illness |
| November 18, 2023 (Note: Rescheduled for November 9, 2024.) | Ottawa | Canada | Canadian Tire Centre | Illness |
| November 20, 2023 (Note: Rescheduled for October 31, 2024.) | Montreal | Canada | Bell Centre | Illness |
| November 30, 2023 (Note: Rescheduled for March 19, 2024.) | Phoenix | United States | Footprint Center | Illness |
| December 2, 2023 (Note: Rescheduled for March 25, 2024.) | San Diego | United States | Pechanga Arena | Illness |
| December 4, 2023 (Note: Rescheduled for April 4, 2024.) | Inglewood | United States | Kia Forum | Illness |
| December 6, 2023 (Note: Rescheduled for April 7, 2024.) | Inglewood | United States | Kia Forum | Illness |
| December 8, 2023 (Note: Initially rescheduled for December 12, 2023, before being postponed again due to Springsteen's illness.) | San Francisco | United States | Chase Center | Illness |
| December 10, 2023 (Note: Rescheduled for March 28, 2024.) | San Francisco | United States | Chase Center | Illness |
| December 12, 2023 (Note: Rescheduled for March 31, 2024.) | San Francisco | United States | Chase Center | Illness |
| May 25, 2024 | Marseille | France | Orange Vélodrome | Springsteen vocal issues |
| May 28, 2024 | Prague | Czech Republic | Letňany | Springsteen vocal issues |
| June 1, 2024 | Milan | Italy | San Siro | Springsteen vocal issues |
| June 3, 2024 | Milan | Italy | San Siro | Springsteen vocal issues |

== Personnel ==
=== The E Street Band ===
- Bruce Springsteen – lead vocals, electric lead guitar, electric and acoustic rhythm guitars, harmonica
- Roy Bittan – piano, synthesizer, accordion
- Nils Lofgren – electric and acoustic rhythm guitars, electric lead guitar, pedal steel guitar, background vocals
- Patti Scialfa – background vocals, occasional duet vocals, acoustic rhythm guitar, tambourine (only appearing at selected shows throughout the tour)
- Garry Tallent – bass guitar, background vocals
- Steven Van Zandt – rhythm guitar, lead guitar, mandolin, background vocals
- Max Weinberg – drums

and

- Jake Clemons – saxophone, percussion, background vocals
- Soozie Tyrell – violin, acoustic rhythm guitar, percussion, background vocals
- Charles Giordano – organ, accordion, electronic glockenspiel

with

- Ed Manion – tenor saxophone, baritone saxophone, percussion
- Ozzie Melendez – trombone, percussion
- Curt Ramm – trumpet, percussion
- Barry Danielian – trumpet, percussion
- Anthony Almonte – percussion, congas, bongos, backing vocals
- Curtis King Jr. – backing vocals, percussion
- Lisa Lowell – backing vocals, percussion
- Michelle Moore – backing vocals, percussion
- Ada Dyer – backing vocals, percussion

== Guest appearances ==
- Michelle Obama and Kate Capshaw—backing vocals and tambourine on "Glory Days" at the April 28, 2023, show in Barcelona.
- Tom Morello—guitar and vocals on "The Ghost of Tom Joad" and "American Skin (41 Shots)" at the April 7, 2024, show in Inglewood.
- Jay Weinberg—drums on Radio Nowhere at the June 22, 2024, show in Barcelona, Spain.
- Joe Grushecky—guitar and vocals on "Twist and Shout" at the August 18, 2024, show in Pittsburgh.
- Mark Pender—trumpet during the 2024 swing in Canada (filled in for Curt Ramm).
- Paul McCartney—vocals and bass guitar on "Can't Buy Me Love" and "Kansas City" at the Liverpool show on June 7, 2025.

== Opening acts ==
- Sam Fender (May 18 and 21, 2023)
- Fantastic Negrito (May 18, 2023, and June 11, 2023)
- The White Buffalo (May 21, 2023)
- The Chicks (July 6 and 8, 2023)
- Frank Turner (July 6, 2023)
- James Bay (July 8, 2023)
- Brittney Spencer (July 8, 2023)
- The Teskey Brothers (July 25, 2023)
- Tash Sultana (July 25, 2023)
- Benny Sings (June 27 and June 29, 2024)
- Black Box Revelation (July 2, 2024)
- Seasick Steve (July 2, 2024)
