= Western Stars (song) =

Single by Bruce Springsteen

from the album Western Stars
- Released: 14 June 2019
- Studio: Stone Hill, New Jersey, United States
- Genre: Folk rock; soft rock
- Songwriter: Bruce Springsteen
- Producer: Ron Aniello

Bruce Springsteen singles chronology
"Tucson Train" (2019)	"Western Stars" (2019)	"Letter to You" (2020)

Music video
- Western Stars on Youtube.com

"Western Stars" is a song by Bruce Springsteen, the title track of his 2019 album. It was the fourth and last single released from the album, also having a physical limited edition release with "The Wayfarer" as the B-side, and charted at No. 87 in Ireland, at No. 4 in Portugal and at No. 41 on the Billboard Hot Rock & Alternative Songs chart.

== History ==
This ballad is a character study about an aging Hollywood actor in the twilight of his career. His biggest claim to fame was that he was once shot in a Western by John Wayne; he reminisces on using the story to earn free drinks. Throughout the song he reflects on his experiences, and expresses gratitude at having outlived many of his peers.

The video was directed by Thom Zimny, who also shot Springsteen's clip for "Tucson Train", and show The Boss in various settings, including a blue-collar bar where he performs the song.
