= Last Man Standing (Bruce Springsteen song) =

2020 Bruce Springsteen song

Song by Bruce Springsteen and the E Street Band

from the album Letter to You
- Language: English
- Released: October 23, 2020 (album)
- Studio: Thrill Hill Recording, Colts Neck, New Jersey, United States
- Genre: Rock
- Length: 4:05
- Label: Columbia
- Songwriter: Bruce Springsteen
- Producers: Ron Aniello; Bruce Springsteen

"Last Man Standing" is a song by Bruce Springsteen and the E-Street Band from the 2020 album Letter to You.

== Song meaning and history ==
"Last Man Standing" reminisces on Springsteen's early days as a musician, and his time in his 1960s band The Castiles, which he formed in 1965 along with friend and former band member George Theiss (to whom the song is dedicated). As Theiss, the only surviving member of The Castiles besides Springsteen, died in 2018, 53 years after they formed the band, with Springsteen flying in to be at his bedside to say goodbye to him, he indeed did leave Springsteen as the "last man standing" from the group. The memories of the places where they played are recalled in the line "Knights of Columbus and the Fireman's Ball, Friday night at the Union Hall, Black-leather clubs all along Route 9". Springsteen stated they were some of his deepest learning years in his life, learning how to be onstage, write, front the band, put together a show and play for different kinds of audiences. Written on an acoustic guitar given to him by an anonymous Italian fan as Bruce exited the Walter Kerr Theater one evening. "Last Man Standing" was the first song composed for the album and the one that established the theme for the album and inspired all that came after. Although the song wasn't one of the singles released from the album, it has become a concert staple from the start of Springsteen's 2023 tour and was performed acoustically with a somber trumpet solo following a speech reflecting on his mortality. It is also the only song from the album played on every date of the tour in both 2023 and 2024, with the exception of the group’s headlining performance at the 2024 Sea.Hear.Now Festival, which focused on older material.

== Song review ==
NJ.com described "Last Man Standing" and "The Power of Prayer" as sonic siblings, choosing the former as the better one of the two. Along with opener "One Minute You're Here" and closer I'll See You in My Dreams", Rolling Stone described it as one of the mortality themed songs.

== Charts ==
On radio airplay in France, "Last Man Standing" reached #12.
