= 2023 Tour =

2023 Tour may refer to:

- 2023 Tour de France
- Springsteen and E Street Band 2023 Tour
- Any other concert tour in Category:2023 concert tours
