= I'll See You in My Dreams (Bruce Springsteen song) =

2021 single by Bruce Springsteen

Promotional single by Bruce Springsteen and the E Street Band

from the album Letter to You
- Released: March 3, 2021
- Recorded: November 2019
- Studio: Thrill Hill Recording, Colts Neck, New Jersey, United States
- Genre: Heartland rock
- Length: 3:29
- Label: Columbia
- Songwriter: Bruce Springsteen
- Producers: Ron Aniello; Bruce Springsteen

Bruce Springsteen and the E Street Band singles chronology
"The Power of Prayer" (2020)	"I'll See You in My Dreams" (2021)	"Dustland" (2021)

Music video
- I'll See You in My Dreams on Youtube.com

"I'll See You in My Dreams" is a 2020 song by Bruce Springsteen and the E Street Band. The song was released as a single in March 2021. The song was dedicated to Michael Gudinski with the music video released on March 3, the day after Gudinski died. The song is the closing track on the 2020 album Letter to You, and along with the opening track "One Minute You're Here", it is one of the two songs about mortality and death that bookend the album.

== Performances ==
The song was first performed in a solo-acoustic arrangement on November 18, 2020, at Springsteen's Stone Hill Farm in Colts Neck, New Jersey for a virtual broadcast of the annual Stand Up for Heroes event, along with another song from the same album, "House of a Thousand Guitars" and the 2007 song "Long Walk Home" Later, it was one of the two songs from the album, the other one being "Ghosts", performed by Springsteen and the E Street Band on the December 12, 2020 episode of Saturday Night Live.

On June 26, 2021, the song was added to the Springsteen on Broadway setlist, replacing "Born to Run" as the closing track, once again performed by Springsteen acoustically on guitar.

On September 11, 2021, Springsteen performed the acoustic version of "I'll See You in My Dreams" at the National September 11 Memorial & Museum in tribute to the victims of the September 11 attacks, during the 9/11 20th Anniversary Memorial Ceremony.

As of 2024, on the ongoing 2023-25 Tour, Springsteen has closed all but two shows with the acoustic version of "I'll See You in My Dreams."

== Critical reception ==
Music Musings & Such gave the song 9.7/10 points, describing Springsteen's voice in the song as contemplative and spirited and saying there is clearly a lot of meaning and personal relevance behind the words; the song has a definite energy and verve that portrays a sense of reconciliation and optimism. Ultimate Classic Rock describes the album as ending as contemplatively as it begins, with the hopeful song declaring "death is not the end", and like the opening "One Minute You're Here," it serves as a melancholy bookend to Springsteen's most reflective work. NJ.com ranks the song 7th on the album, describing it as "a vibrant and telling finale to a record that could easily function as a fond farewell for the full-band outfit if they choose to never record another LP as ambitious as this one." Rolling Stone, comparing the song to opener "One Minute You're Here", says it is more of an upbeat and folky number that finds Springsteen echoing Dylan, declaring "death is not the end".

== Personnel ==
Bruce Springsteen and the E Street Band

- Roy Bittan – keyboards
- Charles Giordano – organ
- Nils Lofgren – guitar
- Patti Scialfa – backing vocals, guitar
- Bruce Springsteen – vocals, guitar, production
- Garry Tallent – bass guitar
- Steven Van Zandt – guitar
- Max Weinberg – drums

Technical personnel

- Ron Aniello – production
- Bob Clearmountain – mixing
- Bob Ludwig – mastering

== Charts ==
Chart performance for "I'll See You in My Dreams"
Chart (2020–2021)	Peak position
San Marino (SMRRTV Top 50)	31
US Digital Song Sales (Billboard)	21
