= Tucson Train =

2019 song by Bruce Springsteen

Single by Bruce Springsteen

from the album Western Stars
- Released: May 30, 2019
- Studio: Stone Hill, New Jersey, United States
- Genre: Americana; roots rock; orchestral rock
- Songwriter: Bruce Springsteen
- Producer: Ron Aniello

Bruce Springsteen singles chronology
"There Goes My Miracle" (2019)	"Tucson Train" (2019)	"Western Stars" (2019)

Music video
- Tucson Train on Youtube.com

"Tucson Train" is a 2019 song by Bruce Springsteen, released as a single from the album Western Stars. It is the third track on the album.

== Release and reviews ==
The song was released as a single, with an official black & white video that shows him playing with a large band, on May 30, 2019. "Tucson Train" has been described as a "rootsy tune" that combines Springsteen's guitar playing with a horn section and a string section. It tells the story of a construction worker, who left San Francisco for a new life in Arizona, having a volatile relationship with his lover, whom he left behind in California. After the story with the woman fell apart, they found they missed each other; now, "tired of the pills and the rain", he rejoices that "baby's coming in on the Tucson train". As many Springsteen songs, it features the element of the train.

== Chart performance ==
Chart (2019)	Peak position
US Hot Rock & Alternative Songs (Billboard)	49
