= Only the Strong Survive (Bruce Springsteen album) =

Studio album by Bruce Springsteen
- Released: November 11, 2022
- Recorded: 2020–2022 at Thrill Hill Recording, New Jersey, US
- Genres: Rock; soul; R&B
- Length: 50:24
- Label: Columbia
- Producers: Ron Aniello; Bruce Springsteen

Bruce Springsteen chronology
The Legendary 1979 No Nukes Concerts (2021)	Only the Strong Survive (2022)	Best of Bruce Springsteen (2024)

Singles from Only the Strong Survive
- 1. "Do I Love You (Indeed I Do)" Released: September 29, 2022; 2. "Nightshift" Released: October 14, 2022; 3. "Don't Play That Song" Released: October 28, 2022; 4. "Turn Back the Hands of Time" Released: November 11, 2022

Only the Strong Survive is the twenty-first studio album by the American singer-songwriter Bruce Springsteen, released on November 11, 2022, through Columbia Records.

The album is a cover album of R&B and soul songs, and Springsteen's second cover album following We Shall Overcome: The Seeger Sessions (2006). It was announced on September 29, 2022, along with the release of "Do I Love You (Indeed I Do)", a cover of the song by Frank Wilson. The singles "Nightshift", "Don't Play That Song" and "Turn Back the Hands of Time" followed throughout October and November 2022. The album title is an eponymous reference to its first track, a cover of the original "Only the Strong Survive" by Jerry Butler. The album was nominated for the Grammy Award for Best Traditional Pop Vocal Album at the 66th Annual Grammy Awards.

== Background and recording ==
In mid-September 2022, Rolling Stone founder Jann Wenner revealed that Springsteen planned to release a new album before the end of the year. Springsteen formally announced the record on September 29, and expressed in a statement that he "wanted to make an album where [he] just sang" and tried to "do justice" to "the great American songbook of the '60s and '70s". He recorded the album at his Thrill Hill Recording studio in New Jersey following his sessions for Letter to You (2020). The album was produced by Ron Aniello, who played all the instruments except Springsteen's guitar and piano, and horns played by the E Street Horns. It also includes two duets with Sam Moore.

== Promotion ==
Springsteen began promoting the album by posting teaser videos on social media in September 2022, including audio snippets of the covers. A music video was released for the album's first single, "Do I Love You (Indeed I Do)", on September 29. A music video for the album's second single, "Nightshift", was released on October 14. A music video for the album's third single, "Don't Play That Song", was released on October 28. The album's fourth single, "Turn Back the Hands of Time", also received a music video on November 11, 2022.

Springsteen promoted the album's release with four appearances on The Tonight Show Starring Jimmy Fallon from November 14 to 16, 2022, along with a special Thanksgiving episode on November 24, 2022.

== Critical reception ==
Professional ratings
Aggregate scores
Source	Rating
AnyDecentMusic?	7.1/10
Metacritic	74/100
Review scores
Source	Rating
AllMusic	3/5 stars
Clash	8/10
Classic Rock	3/5 stars
The Guardian	3/5 stars
musicOMH	4/5 stars
NME	4/5 stars
Paste	7.8/10
Pitchfork	7.0/10
PopMatters	8/10
The Telegraph	4/5 stars

On Metacritic, Only the Strong Survive received a score of 74 out of 100 based on seventeen critics' reviews, indicating "generally favorable" reception. Erica Campbell of NME felt that Springsteen "resurrects these classics as a means of celebration, pointing back to some of the strongest songwriters and vocalists of all time with 15 huge and heartfelt tributes, as opposed to just churning out shallow reimaginings". Jonathan Bernstein of Rolling Stone wrote that although it is a "shame" that aside from horn players and a "Sam Moore cameo, none of the soul-steeped musicians from Springsteen's past are to be found on his R&B love letter" and "even if the arrangements occasionally feel static in their mimicry, Springsteen's voice shines and sparkles".

Clash's Emma Harrison described Only the Strong Survive as "an astute sonic journey through a genre that has always resonated with The Boss", writing that it is "unequivocally clear" the "passion" Springsteen has for the genres of soul and R&B, as well as an "ideal opportunity for a new audience to discover glorious discoveries from a rock 'n' roll stalwart". Michael Elliott of PopMatters agreed that Springsteen's "love for this timeless, joyous soul music is jubilant and infectious", opining that while his lead vocal "mostly delivers" and his "robust rasp is perfect for" the album, there are moments where he "struggles, sounding rushed, as the song overpowers him".

Reviewing the album for musicOMH, John Murphy remarked that "the record works best when it dives into less familiar territory", calling the album "pretty much Bruce does karaoke, but when it's done this well and with so much obvious love for the source material, it's irresistible". Neil McCormick of The Telegraph found that the album "remind[s] us how much R'n'B filtered into the epic rock sound he ultimately developed" and compared it to "stumbling into the world's greatest bar band playing the world's greatest setlist at the wildest shindig ever thrown". Stephen Thomas Erlewine of AllMusic wrote that the tracks chosen for the album "demonstrate deep knowledge and good taste" and are "enjoyable enough" that "Springsteen and Aniello aren't exactly re-interpreting these 15 songs: they're merely playing them for a lark".

Sam Sodomsky of Pitchfork wrote that the album has "character, and more than that, it's got energy: Springsteen has never sounded quite so lighthearted, so unburdened, on record", summarizing that Springsteen "seems more driven by the act of creating itself: lighting a spark" and knowing others could find the "hope" in the songs that they originally "provided for him".

== Only the Strong Survive: Volume 2 ==
In a November 2022 interview, Springsteen said that he had plans for a volume 2 of Only the Strong Survive and that the album was "probably three-quarters recorded".

On June 15, 2023, former E Street Band member David Sancious, who left the band in 1974, said that he is set to appear on a follow-up to Springsteen's Only the Strong Survive and that Springsteen has completed 18 songs for the album. Sancious said he expected to tour with Springsteen to support the album in 2024.

== Track listing ==
Only the Strong Survive track listing
No.	Title	Writer(s)	Original artist(s)	Length
1.	"Only the Strong Survive"	Jerry Butler; Kenny Gamble; Leon Huff	Jerry Butler	2:59
2.	"Soul Days" (featuring Sam Moore)	Jonnie Barnett	Dobie Gray	3:58
3.	"Nightshift"	Walter Orange; Dennis Lambert; Franne Golde	Commodores	4:56
4.	"Do I Love You (Indeed I Do)"	Frank Wilson	Frank Wilson	2:27
5.	"The Sun Ain't Gonna Shine Anymore"	Bob Crewe; Bob Gaudio	Frankie Valli, popularized by The Walker Brothers	3:44
6.	"Turn Back the Hands of Time"	Jack Daniels; Bonnie Thompson	Tyrone Davis	3:07
7.	"When She Was My Girl"	Larry Gottlieb; Marc Blatte	Four Tops	3:17
8.	"Hey, Western Union Man"	Butler; Gamble; Huff	Jerry Butler	3:53
9.	"I Wish It Would Rain"	Norman Whitfield; Barrett Strong; Rodger Penzabene	The Temptations	3:24
10.	"Don't Play That Song"	Ahmet Ertegun; Betty Nelson	Ben E. King	3:34
11.	"Any Other Way"	William Bell	William Bell	2:54
12.	"I Forgot to Be Your Lover" (featuring Sam Moore)	Bell; Booker T. Jones	William Bell	2:28
13.	"7 Rooms of Gloom"	Holland–Dozier–Holland	Four Tops	2:39
14.	"What Becomes of the Brokenhearted"	William Weatherspoon; Paul Riser; James Dean	Jimmy Ruffin	3:31
15.	"Someday We'll Be Together"	Johnny Bristol; Jackey Beavers; Harvey Fuqua	Johnny & Jackey, popularized by Diana Ross & the Supremes	3:33
Total length:				50:24

== Personnel ==
Musicians

- Bruce Springsteen – vocals (all tracks); background vocals, keyboards (track 5); guitar (6, 10, 11), piano (7)
- Ron Aniello – bass, drums, guitar (all tracks); percussion (1–10, 14, 15), piano (1–6, 8–15), organ (1–4, 6–8, 10–15), vibraphone (1, 4, 6, 8, 9, 13, 14), keyboards (3, 5, 7, 8, 10–13, 15), glockenspiel (4, 7, 12), background vocals (5); chimes, timpani (14)
- Ed Manion – baritone saxophone
- Tom Timko – baritone saxophone
- Bill Holloman – tenor saxophone
- Clark Gayton – trombone
- Barry Danielian – trumpet
- Curt Ramm – trumpet
- Soozie Tyrell – backing vocals (1, 4, 6)
- Lisa Lowell – backing vocals (1, 4, 6)
- Sam Moore – background vocals (2, 12)
- Curtis King Jr. – background vocals (3, 7–10, 13–15)
- Dennis Collins – background vocals (3, 7–10, 13–15)
- Fonzi Thornton – background vocals (3, 7–10, 13–15)
- Michelle Moore – background vocals (4, 6)
- Rob Mathes – conductor (4–10, 12, 14, 15)
- Lisa Kim – concertmaster, violin (4–10, 12, 14, 15)
- Clarice Jensen – cello (4–10, 12, 14, 15)
- Patrick Jee – cello (4–10, 12, 14, 15)
- Sophie Shao – cello (4–10, 12, 14, 15)
- Danielle Farina – viola (4–10, 12, 14, 15)
- Devin Moore – viola (4–10, 12, 14, 15)
- Rebecca Young – viola (4–10, 12, 14, 15)
- Annaliesa Place – violin (4–10, 12, 14, 15)
- Dasol Jeong – violin (4–10, 12, 14, 15)
- Joanna Maurer – violin (4–10, 12, 14, 15)
- Kristi Helberg – violin (4–10, 12, 14, 15)
- Kuan Cheng Lu – violin (4–10, 12, 14, 15)
- Sein Ryu – violin (4–10, 12, 14, 15)
- Sharon Yamada – violin (4–10, 12, 14, 15)
- Su Hyun Park – violin (4–10, 12, 14, 15)
- Suzanne Ornstein – violin (4–10, 12, 14, 15)
- Rob Lebret – guitar (8)

Technical

- Bruce Springsteen – production
- Ron Aniello – production, mixing, engineering
- Rob Lebret – mixing, engineering
- Bob Ludwig – mastering
- Andres Bermudez – engineering (2, 12)
- Jon Landau – executive production

== Charts ==
=== Weekly charts ===
Weekly chart performance for Only the Strong Survive
Chart (2022)	Peak position
Australian Albums (ARIA)	3
Austrian Albums (Ö3 Austria)	1
Belgian Albums (Ultratop Flanders)	2
Belgian Albums (Ultratop Wallonia)	3
Canadian Albums (Billboard)	8
Croatian International Albums (HDU)	1
Czech Albums (ČNS IFPI)	32
Danish Albums (Hitlisten)	4
Dutch Albums (Album Top 100)	1
Finnish Albums (Suomen virallinen lista)	3
French Albums (SNEP)	3
German Albums (Offizielle Top 100)	1
Greek Albums (IFPI)	18
Hungarian Albums (MAHASZ)	23
Irish Albums (Official Charts)	2
Italian Albums (FIMI)	2
Japanese Albums (Oricon)	15
Japanese Digital Albums (Oricon)	35
Japanese Hot Albums (Billboard Japan)	21
New Zealand Albums (RMNZ)	4
Norwegian Albums (VG-lista)	1
Polish Albums (ZPAV)	12
Portuguese Albums (AFP)	2
Scottish Albums (Official Charts)	1
Spanish Albums (Promusicae)	2
Swedish Albums (Sverigetopplistan)	1
Swiss Albums (Schweizer Hitparade)	1
UK Albums (Official Charts)	2
US Billboard 200	8

=== Year-end charts ===
Year-end chart performance for Only the Strong Survive
Chart (2022)	Position
Austrian Albums (Ö3 Austria)	15
Belgian Albums (Ultratop Flanders)	42
Belgian Albums (Ultratop Wallonia)	134
Dutch Albums (Album Top 100)	78
French Albums (SNEP)	110
German Albums (Offizielle Top 100)	32
Italian Albums (FIMI)	81
Portuguese Albums (AFP)	19
Spanish Albums (PROMUSICAE)	32
Swiss Albums (Schweizer Hitparade)	16
UK Albums (OCC)	96

== Certifications ==
Certifications for Only the Strong Survive
Region	Certification	Certified units/sales
France (SNEP)	Gold	50,000^{‡}
Italy (FIMI)	Gold	25,000^{‡}
Spain (Promusicae)	Gold	20,000^{‡}
United Kingdom (BPI)	Silver	60,000^{‡}
^{‡} Sales+streaming figures based on certification alone.
