= There Goes My Miracle =

2019 song by Bruce Springsteen

Single by Bruce Springsteen

from the album Western Stars
- Released: May 17, 2019
- Studio: Stone Hill, New Jersey, United States
- Genre: Country pop
- Songwriter(s): Bruce Springsteen
- Producer(s): Ron Aniello

Bruce Springsteen singles chronology
"Hello Sunshine" (2019)	"There Goes My Miracle" (2019)	"Tucson Train" (2019)

"There Goes My Miracle" is a song by the American singer-songwriter Bruce Springsteen from his 2019 album Western Stars. It was released as the second single anticipating the album in May 2019, following "Hello Sunshine". Although it didn't chart on the Billboard US charts, it reached number 1 on the radio airplay chart in Italy in 2019; it also peaked at #5 on the iTunes chart in Italy.

== Song meaning and structure ==
"There Goes My Miracle" is sung in a higher register than usual for Springsteen, and finds him lamenting a love that slipped away. "There Goes My Miracle" has also been described as "a healthy embrace of Springsteen's love for crooners like Burt Bacharach".
