= Thom Zimny =

American film director editor

Thom Zimny is an American film director and editor, most noted for his work on both music videos and long-form concert films with American rock singer-songwriter Bruce Springsteen.

== Early career ==
Zimny began his career as an editor with credits on independent films and music videos, and won an Emmy Award for Outstanding Picture Editing for Variety Programming at the 53rd Primetime Emmy Awards in 2001 for his work on the Springsteen concert special Bruce Springsteen & The E Street Band: Live in New York City. He was also an editor on the drama television series The Wire.

== Work with Springsteen ==
In 2005 he released Wings for Wheels: The Making of Born to Run, his first credit as a director, which won the Grammy Award for Best Music Film at the 49th Annual Grammy Awards in 2007.

He directed the Netflix film of the Springsteen on Broadway concert residency, for which he won the Emmy for Outstanding Directing for a Variety Special at the 71st Primetime Creative Arts Emmy Awards in 2019.

The 2019 film Western Stars, which Zimny co-directed with Springsteen as the musician's own directorial debut, premiered at the 2019 Toronto International Film Festival.

In 2020 he directed the documentary film Letter to You. Zimny directed the 2024 documentary Road Diary: Bruce Springsteen and the E Street Band showcasing the band's tour rehearsals after a six year hiatus following the COVID-19 pandemic as well as Springsteen's own personal reflections along with rare clips and extensive concert performances from the Springsteen and E Street Band 2023–2025 Tour. In 2026, he directed the video for the song Streets of Minneapolis, about the events of Operation Metro Surge.

In 2026, Zimny along with Chris Hilson directed Bruce Springsteen and the E Street Band: Land of Hope and Dreams (Philadelphia Freedom Cut). It was filmed during Springsteen's Land of Hope and Dreams American Tour on May 30, 2026 in Philadelphia, PA. The entire show will be released in four parts with the first part featuring thirty-seven minutes of footage being released to YouTube on September 9, 2026.

== Other work ==
He also directed the Elvis Presley documentary film Elvis Presley: The Searcher, the Willie Nelson documentary series Willie Nelson and Family, and the 2023 Sylvester Stallone documentary film Sly.
