= Springsteen on Broadway =

Concert residency by Bruce Springsteen in New York City

- Residency by Bruce Springsteen
- Location: New York City, U.S.
- Venue: Walter Kerr Theatre (2017–2018); St. James Theatre (2021)
- Start date: October 3, 2017 (preview performances); October 12, 2017 (official opening); June 26, 2021 (St. James Theatre)
- End date: December 15, 2018; September 4, 2021 (St. James Theatre)
- No. of shows: 236 (Walter Kerr Theatre); 31 (St. James Theatre)
- Box office: $113,058,952

Bruce Springsteen concert chronology
- The River Tour 2016/Summer '17 (2016–17); Springsteen on Broadway (2017–18; 2021); 2023 Tour (2023–25)

Springsteen on Broadway is a concert residency by Bruce Springsteen held at the Walter Kerr Theatre and St. James Theatre in New York City. The original residency at the Walter Kerr Theatre consisted of Springsteen performing five shows a week, Tuesday through Saturday. Preview performances began on October 3, 2017, followed by the official opening on October 12, 2017. The run was originally expected to conclude on November 26, 2017; however, due to high demand for tickets and issues with scalpers, additional dates were added through June 30, 2018. The show was extended a second time on March 20, 2018, extending the run through December 15, 2018. On June 7, 2021, Springsteen announced a limited 31-show run of Springsteen on Broadway at the St. James Theatre beginning on June 26, 2021, with additional performances through September 4, 2021.

The shows featured Springsteen, solo, playing guitar and piano, performing his music, restating incidents from his 2016 autobiography, Born to Run, and performing other spoken reminiscences written for the show. Springsteen's wife, Patti Scialfa, also appeared at most shows. The residency at the Walter Kerr Theatre grossed over $113 million from a total of 236 shows.

== Background ==
On June 16, 2017, information leaked that Bruce Springsteen would be performing an eight-week run on Broadway in New York City at the 960-seat Walter Kerr Theatre in the fall of 2017. On August 9, 2017, the performances were made official by Springsteen's website. "Bruce has had this specific idea in mind since last December. It came into focus slowly and then all at once last January," Springsteen's manager Jon Landau said in a statement.

Springsteen said of the performances, "I wanted to do some shows that were as personal and as intimate as possible. I chose Broadway for this project because it has the beautiful old theaters which seemed like the right setting for what I have in mind. In fact, with one or two exceptions, the 960 seats of the Walter Kerr Theatre is probably the smallest venue I’ve played in the last 40 years. My show is just me, the guitar, the piano and the words and music. Some of the show is spoken, some of it is sung. It loosely follows the arc of my life and my work. All of it together is in pursuit of my constant goal to provide an entertaining evening and to communicate something of value."

The creative team for Springsteen on Broadway included Heather Wolensky (scenic design), Natasha Katz (lighting design) and Brian Ronan (sound design).

On September 19, 2017, Springsteen performed a rehearsal show at Monmouth University that was invitation only and attended by around 200 family members and close friends.

During episode 3 of the Renegades podcast he co-hosted with former president Barack Obama, Springsteen revealed the initial inspiration for the show came from a private concert he performed at the White House during the final month of the Obama Presidency. According to Springsteen, President Obama and First Lady Michelle Obama both encouraged Springsteen to turn the performance into a show.

Springsteen announced an additional limited run of performances at the St. James Theatre from June 26 to September 4, 2021. He said, "I loved doing Springsteen on Broadway and I’m thrilled to have been asked to reprise the show as part of the reopening of Broadway". Proceeds from the opening night were to be donated to a group of local New York and New Jersey charities including the Boys and Girls Club of Monmouth County, Broadway Cares/Equity Fights AIDS, Community FoodBank of New Jersey, Food Bank For New York City, Fulfill (Monmouth & Ocean Counties Foodbank), Long Island Cares, NJ Pandemic Relief Fund, and Actors Fund of America. Springsteen said that Landau and Jordan Roth, owner of Broadway's Jujamcyn Theaters, pitched him the idea, but it was a "friend" who came to his home and talked him into doing more shows. "It gives me something to do this summer so I won’t be lazying around on the beach. I knew we were going to tour with the E Street Band next year so I said I'll take some time off”, Springsteen said. He also said that he would like to present the show as it was originally when it debuted in October 2017, saying, “I'd like to tighten it up a little bit, if anything. I would like to sort of get it closer to what it was when I initially debuted it on Broadway than the way it was toward the end.”

== Tickets ==
In response to major issues with scalping and resales on previous Springsteen tours, tickets were made available exclusively through Ticketmaster Verified Fan, a system put into place by Ticketmaster in February 2017. Ticket prices ranged from $75 to $850. Despite Ticketmaster's efforts to eliminate bots and resellers, tickets immediately appeared on resale sites such as StubHub minutes after they went on sale. Several hundred tickets were available on StubHub with prices ranging from $1,800 to $6,700. Due to scalper issues and the original run of dates selling out in minutes, Springsteen announced the residency would continue until February 3, 2018, with tickets for the newly announced dates going on sale September 7, 2017. A second extension to June 30, 2018, was later announced, with no new registrations being taken. Instead, people who had previously registered but were unable to get tickets would be contacted to give them the opportunity to purchase seats.

Tickets for the second run of limited performances in 2021 went on sale June 10, 2021, through the show’s official ticketing provider SeatGeek. Audience members were required to provide proof of full COVID-19 vaccination to enter the theatre.

== Program ==
Songs were interspersed with spoken word passages. The program below reflects the most common set of songs performed during the residency; see notes below for changes to the program made over the span of the residency.

1. "Growin' Up" (from Greetings from Asbury Park, N.J.)
2. "My Hometown" (from Born in the U.S.A.)
3. "My Father's House" (from Nebraska)
4. "The Wish" (from Tracks)
5. "Thunder Road" (from Born to Run)
6. "The Promised Land" (from Darkness on the Edge of Town)
7. "Born in the U.S.A." (from Born in the U.S.A.)
8. "Tenth Avenue Freeze-Out" (from Born to Run)
9. "Tougher Than the Rest" (from Tunnel of Love)
10. "Brilliant Disguise" (from Tunnel of Love)
11. "Long Walk Home" (from Magic)
12. "The Rising" (from The Rising)
13. "Dancing in the Dark" (from Born in the U.S.A.)
14. "Land of Hope and Dreams" (from Wrecking Ball)
15. "Born to Run" (from Born to Run)

=== Changes to program ===
- "The Ghost of Tom Joad" was performed during previews, placed before "Long Walk Home," in place of "The Rising."
- "Long Time Comin'", from Devils & Dust, was paired with "The Ghost of Tom Joad" for instances in which Patti Scialfa was unable to perform in the show, replacing "Tougher than the Rest" and "Brilliant Disguise," respectively; the first instance of this was on December 26, 2017, due to Scialfa catching the flu, and occurred sporadically thereafter.
- On June 19, 2018, Springsteen deviated from the show's script after "Brilliant Disguise" to condemn the Trump administration family separation policy and performed "The Ghost of Tom Joad" in place of "Long Walk Home," retaining this change for every show thereafter.
- On July 10, 2018, Springsteen performed an encore consisting of "This Hard Land" from his greatest hits album to make up for a shortened show that did not feature Scialfa, where only "Long Time Comin'" was performed in place of "Tougher Than the Rest" and "Brilliant Disguise," as "The Ghost of Tom Joad" was already in the set. Springsteen allowed fans to take photos and film the encore performance.
- For the 2021 run, Springsteen changed three songs. "I'll See You In My Dreams", from his latest album Letter to You, replaced "Born to Run," "Fire" replaced "Brilliant Disguise," and "American Skin (41 Shots)" replaced "The Ghost of Tom Joad" after some remarks about the ongoing civil unrest.

== Netflix special and soundtrack album ==
Springsteen on Broadway premiered on Netflix in the early morning of December 16, 2018, just hours after the final Broadway performance closed. Filming for the concert special took place July 17 and 18, 2018, with a private audience in attendance. A soundtrack album was released on December 14, 2018, to widespread acclaim from critics, including Robert Christgau, who said "the Springsteen [work] this most recalls isn't like any earlier album but the 2016 autobiography he called Born to Run for better reasons than you might imagine. Like that fast-reading 508-pager, its aim is to simultaneously depict and demythologize the Jersey shore and poke major holes in an authenticity it reconceives at a truer level of complexity".

== Critical reaction ==
The New York Times said "as portraits of artists go, there may never have been anything as real – and beautiful – on Broadway". Rolling Stone noted "it is one of the most compelling and profound shows by a rock musician in recent memory". The Guardian observed "there's a fragility and a new light cast on the songs and his relationship with Scialfa, as if he stands in her emotional shadow". Variety reported the show "is as much a self-made monument to its master's vision and hurricane-force ambition as it is to his life and career, and it bears the mark of a self-made man who’ll write his own history".

On June 10, 2018, Springsteen received a Special Tony Award for Springsteen on Broadway at the 72nd Tony Awards.

=== Awards and nominations ===
Award nominations for Springsteen on Broadway
Year	Award	Category	Nominee(s)	Result
2018	Tony Awards	Special Tony Award	Bruce Springsteen	Received
2019	Primetime Emmy Awards	Outstanding Variety Special (Pre-Recorded)	Springsteen on Broadway	Nominated
2019	Primetime Emmy Awards	Outstanding Directing for a Variety Special	Thom Zimny	Won

== Personnel ==
- Bruce Springsteen – lead vocals, guitar, piano, harmonica
- Patti Scialfa – backing vocals on "Brilliant Disguise" and "Tougher Than the Rest"

== See also ==
- Letter to You, a 2020 studio album by Springsteen featuring photographs shot by Danny Clinch while promoting this presentation
- List of highest-grossing concert series at a single venue
