= Nightshift (song) =

1985 song by the Commodores

- Standard artwork (US vinyl single pictured)

Single by Commodores

from the album Nightshift
- B-side: "I Keep Running"
- Released: January 18, 1985
- Recorded: 1984
- Genre: R&B; soul
- Length: 5:04 (album version); 4:19 (7" single edit)
- Label: Motown
- Songwriters: Walter Orange; Dennis Lambert; Franne Golde
- Producer: Dennis Lambert

Commodores singles chronology
"Only You" (1983)	"Nightshift" (1985)	"Animal Instinct" (1985)

"Nightshift" is a 1985 song by the Commodores and the title track from their album of the same name. The song was written by lead singer Walter Orange in collaboration with Dennis Lambert and Franne Golde as a tribute to soul/R&B singers Jackie Wilson and Marvin Gaye, both of whom died in 1984. The song was released as the album's first single in January 1985 by Motown Records. "Nightshift" was recorded in 1984 and became the Commodores' first hit after Lionel Richie's departure from the group. Bruce Springsteen covered the song in his 2022 studio album, Only the Strong Survive.

== Background ==
The song features a lead vocal from drummer Walter Orange, who had sung lead years earlier on "Brick House". Lionel Richie's replacement, J.D. Nicholas, sings the second verse and then Orange and Nicholas share lead vocals on the remaining choruses.

The first verse mentions Marvin Gaye's song "What's Going On", while the second verse mentions Jackie Wilson's "Lonely Teardrops" ("Say you will"), "Baby Workout" and "(Your Love Keeps Lifting Me) Higher and Higher".

== Release and reception ==
"Nightshift" became their biggest hit after Richie's departure, peaking at number three on both the UK Singles Chart (for the week of March 3, 1985) and the Billboard Hot 100 (for the week of April 20, 1985), and rising to number one on the Hot Black Singles chart; the single also became a success on the Adult Contemporary and the Hot Dance Music/Maxi-Singles Sales charts in the first half of that year. It was the group's final top ten hit.

Although the band was against the label decision to release it as a single, it won a Grammy Award in 1985 for Best Vocal R&B Performance by a Duo/Group.

John Leland of Spin said the song, "puts the group back on the map with a vengeance. Its spare, lilting Caribbean groove dispenses with the group's penchant for schmaltz, and new lead singer J. D. Nicholas' sweet tenor is all late-night yearning."

== Chart performance ==
=== Weekly charts ===
Weekly chart performance for "Nightshift"
Chart (1985)	Peak position
Australia (Kent Music Report)	8
Austria (Ö3 Austria Top 40)	4
Belgium (Ultratop 50 Flanders)	2
Canada Top Singles (RPM)	7
Canada Adult Contemporary (RPM)	4
Finland (Suomen virallinen lista)	3
France (SNEP)	34
Germany (GfK)	4
Ireland (IRMA)	3
Israel (IBA)	2
Italy (Musica e dischi)	17
Netherlands (Dutch Top 40)	1
Netherlands (Single Top 100)	1
New Zealand (Recorded Music NZ)	2
South Africa (Springbok Radio)	2
Sweden (Sverigetopplistan)	13
Switzerland (Schweizer Hitparade)	5
UK Singles (Official Charts)	3
US Billboard Hot 100	3
US Adult Contemporary (Billboard)	2
US Hot Black Singles (Billboard)	1
US Hot Dance Music/Maxi-Singles Sales (Billboard)	6
US Cash Box Top 100	4

=== Year-end charts ===
Year-end chart performance for "Nightshift"
Chart (1985)	Position
Australia (Kent Music Report)	67
Austria (Ö3 Austria)	21
Belgium (Ultratop Flanders)	17
Canada Top Singles (RPM)	49
Germany (GfK Entertainment)	26
Netherlands (Dutch Top 40)	2
Netherlands (Single Top 100)	2
New Zealand (Recorded Music NZ)	20
South Africa (Springbok Radio)	17
UK Singles	41
US Top Pop Singles (Billboard)	40
US Cash Box Top 100	46

== Certifications ==
Certifications for "Nightshift"
Region	Certification	Certified units/sales
Canada (Music Canada)	Gold	50,000^{^}
New Zealand (RMNZ)	Gold	15,000^{‡}
United Kingdom (BPI)	Silver	250,000^{^}
^{^} Shipments figures based on certification alone.^{‡} Sales+streaming figures based on certification alone.

== Bruce Springsteen version ==
"Nightshift"

Single by Bruce Springsteen

from the album Only the Strong Survive
- Released: 2022
- Studio: Thrill Hill Recording, New Jersey, US
- Genre: R&B; soul
- Label: Columbia
- Songwriters: Walter Orange; Dennis Lambert; Franne Golde
- Producers: Ron Aniello and Bruce Springsteen

Bruce Springsteen singles chronology
"Do I Love You (Indeed I Do)" (2022)	"Nightshift" (2022)	"Don't Play That Song" (2022)

Music video
- Nightshift on Youtube.com

American singer-songwriter Bruce Springsteen recorded a version of the song for his 2022 album, Only the Strong Survive. The song was released as a single and music video in October 2022.

Springsteen performed his version of the song with a backing band from Only the Strong Survive on the November 16, 2022, episode of The Tonight Show Starring Jimmy Fallon.

Springsteen later performed his version of the song with the E Street Band on the 2023 Tour, where it was the only song from Only the Strong Survive to become a regular part of the setlist.
