= The Power of Prayer =

2020 Bruce Springsteen song

Promotional single by Bruce Springsteen and the E Street Band

from the album Letter to You
- Language: English
- Released: October 23, 2020 (album); November 23, 2020 (music video)
- Studio: Thrill Hill Recording, Colts Neck, New Jersey, United States
- Genre: Rock
- Length: 3:36
- Label: Columbia
- Songwriter: Bruce Springsteen
- Producers: Ron Aniello; Bruce Springsteen

Bruce Springsteen and the E Street Band singles chronology
"Chinatown" (2020)	"The Power of Prayer" (2020)	"I'll See You in My Dreams" (2021)

Music video
- The Power of Prayer on Youtube.com

"The Power of Prayer" is a 2020 song by the American singer-songwriter Bruce Springsteen from his album Letter to You. It was only released as a radio single, and a promotional video was released on November 23, a month after the release of the album.

== Song facts and release ==
The song has a spiritual language. Springsteen was born in a Roman Catholic household, and that turned him off religion, but he didn't lose his faith. The video features archival footage from his youth and clips of Springsteen and the E Street Band working on the song in the studio. The message of the video is about old friends he’s lost and the optimism of that era, reflected in the footage of Jersey Shore in the summertime during Springsteen’s youth. The song gained radio airplay since December 4 in Italy, where it hit #1; besides radio airplay, "The Power of Prayer" reached high positions on streaming platforms: iTunes (#7) and Apple Music (#5), respectively in the United Kingdom and Norway. Surprisingly, it did not chart in the United States.

== Reception ==
NJ.com criticized the song, describing it as too similar to the precedent song on the album, "Last Man Standing". Ultimate Classic Rock described the song negatively (as a forgettable song that could be a leftover from any Springsteen album from the past 15 years) as well. Rolling Stone's review was better, describing the song as a "lilting, gentle rocker, where he praises Ben E. King and the Drifters' "This Magic Moment" as an answered prayer and exclaims I’m reachin’ for heaven, we’ll make it there to his lover".
