= Hello Sunshine (Bruce Springsteen song) =

Single by Bruce Springsteen

from the album Western Stars
- Released: April 26, 2019
- Studio: Stone Hill, New Jersey, United States
- Genre: Soft rock; country
- Songwriter: Bruce Springsteen
- Producer: Ron Aniello

Bruce Springsteen singles chronology
"Just Like Fire Would" (2014)	"Hello Sunshine" (2019)	"There Goes My Miracle" (2019)

Music video
- Hello Sunshine on Youtube.com

"Hello Sunshine" is a song by Bruce Springsteen, released in 2019 as the lead single from the album Western Stars, on April 26. It is a melancholic, mellow ballad that reflects the influences of Jimmy Webb, Glen Campbell and Burt Bacharach. Lyrically, the track finds Springsteen, who has "fallen in love with lonely", driving endlessly on an empty road.

== Release and reviews ==
The song was well received. Pitchfork described it as "gorgeous", and compared it to country music classics “Everybody’s Talkin’”, “Gentle on My Mind” and “Good Time Charlie’s Got the Blues”. Spin describes it as having a "gorgeous wordless bridge" and as a "simple love song, aimed at universal truths, not short-story specifics", with "reactive and lyrical strings".

== Charts ==
Chart performance for "Hello Sunshine"
Chart (2019)	Peak position
Belgium (Ultratip Bubbling Under Flanders)	11
Netherlands (Airplay Top 50)	40
Netherlands (Dutch Tipparade 40)	19
US Hot Rock & Alternative Songs (Billboard)	16

== Personnel ==
From album liner notes:

- Bruce Springsteen - vocals, acoustic guitar, synth strings, percussion, B3, piano
- Ron Aniello - piano, electric guitar, bass, synth strings
- Matt Chamberlain - drums
- Marc Muller - pedal steel

From Avatar Strings:

- Rob Mathes - conductor, arranger
- Lisa Kim - concertmaster
- Hyunju Lee - violin
- Joanna Maurer - violin
- Sharon Yamada - violin
- Annaliesa Place - violin
- Suzanne Ornstein - violin
- Liz Kim - violin
- Jung Sun Yoo - violin
- Emily Popham - violin
- Robert Rinehart - viola
- Vivek Kamath - viola
- Desiree Elsevier - viola
- Alan Stepansky - cello
- Nathan Vickery - cello
