= Western Stars =

2019 studio album by Bruce Springsteen

Studio album by Bruce Springsteen
- Released: June 14, 2019
- Recorded: 2010, 2014, 2018–2019
- Studios: Stone Hill (Colts Neck, New Jersey); Ocean Studios (Burbank, California); Very Loud House (Woodland Hills, California); Avatar (New York, New York); Sage and Sound (Hollywood, California)
- Genres: Roots rock; folk rock; soft rock; country rock; orchestral pop; country pop
- Length: 51:00
- Label: Columbia
- Producers: Ron Aniello, Bruce Springsteen

Bruce Springsteen chronology
Springsteen on Broadway (2018)	Western Stars (2019)	Letter to You (2020)

Singles from Western Stars
- 1. "Hello Sunshine" Released: April 26, 2019; 2. "There Goes My Miracle" Released: May 17, 2019; 3. "Tucson Train" Released: May 30, 2019; 4. "Western Stars" Released: June 14, 2019

Western Stars is the nineteenth studio album by the American singer-songwriter Bruce Springsteen, released on June 14, 2019, by Columbia Records. It was produced by Ron Aniello, who worked with Springsteen on his two previous albums: Wrecking Ball (2012) and High Hopes (2014).

The album was a chart success in the United States—where it became Springsteen's 20th top-10 album—and abroad. It was also met with widespread acclaim from critics, who found the music elegiac and evocative of the American West.

A full performance of the album was filmed and released by Warner Bros. Pictures. The soundtrack of this movie (Western Stars – Songs from the Film) has an almost identical track list and was released in September 2019. Twelve outtakes from the recording sessions for Western Stars were released in June 2025 on an album titled Twilight Hours, which is part of the Tracks II: The Lost Albums box set.

== Background ==
Springsteen stated in April 2019 that the album was influenced by "Southern California pop music" of the 1970s, including artists such as Glen Campbell and Burt Bacharach. Upon announcing the album in April 2019, he called it "a return to my solo recordings featuring character-driven songs and sweeping, cinematic orchestral arrangements", with a press release characterizing it as about a "range of American themes, of highways and desert spaces, of isolation and community and the permanence of home and hope".

== Marketing ==
"Hello Sunshine" was released on April 26, 2019, as the album's lead single, along with a music video. "There Goes My Miracle" was released as the album's second single on May 17. The album's third single, "Tucson Train", was released on May 30, along with a music video directed by Thom Zimny. A music video for the album's fourth single, "Western Stars", also directed by Zimny, was released on June 14. A limited edition 7" vinyl double A-side single, featuring "Western Stars" and "The Wayfarer", was released on Black Friday Record Store Day on November 29, 2019.

Western Stars was released by Columbia on June 14, 2019. The following week, it debuted at number two on the US Billboard 200 with 66,000 album-equivalent units sold, of which 62,000 were pure album sales. It is Springsteen's 20th US top 10 album.

A documentary film, which marked Springsteen's directorial debut and features a full performance of the album, premiered at the 2019 Toronto International Film Festival in September 2019, with a wide theatrical release in October 2019 along with an accompanying soundtrack for the film. Springsteen did not tour for the album and announced that he would shift focus towards recording a new studio album with the E Street Band in the fall of 2019.

== Critical reception ==
Professional ratings
Aggregate scores
Source	Rating
AnyDecentMusic?	8.0/10
Metacritic	84/100
Review scores
Source	Rating
AllMusic	4/5 stars
The A.V. Club	B−
Entertainment Weekly	A−
The Guardian	4/5 stars
The Independent	5/5 stars
The Irish Times	5/5 stars
NME	4/5 stars
Pitchfork	7.8/10
Q	4/5 stars
Rolling Stone	4/5 stars

Western Stars was met with widespread critical acclaim. At Metacritic, which assigns a weighted average score out of 100 to reviews and ratings from selected mainstream critics, the album received an average score of 84, based on 31 reviews.

Reviewing for Rolling Stone in May 2019, Will Hermes said that, while several songs "straddle the classic and the cliché", the album's music "evokes country-tinged California pop from the Sixties and Seventies, sounding like nothing [Springsteen]'s done before". In Entertainment Weekly, Maura Johnston applauded Springsteen for "transforming the enormous into the intimate" on the album, while The Independent's Mark Beaumont said the "sumptuous, cinematic album is nothing short of a late-period masterpiece" for the musician. Writing for NME, Thomas Smith regarded Western Stars as "majestic in its scale, but traditional in its subject matter and narratives … a wonderful thing." Pat Carty in Hot Press described the album as a "heartbreaking yet life-affirmingly beautiful record - both elegiac and warm, a trick few others, if any, could pull off." Sam Sodomsky from Pitchfork said, "Springsteen returns with elegiac and wise songwriting conjuring the golden expanse of the American West; it’s his best studio album in years." In the opinion of AllMusic's Stephen Thomas Erlewine, "This isn't a piece of nostalgia on Springsteen's part, though. These references deepen a collection of songs that are sweet, sad, and searching, songs that feel finely etched on their own terms but gather a deep, lasting resonance when collected on this enchanting album." The songs were also regarded by Alexis Petridis as "strong enough to withstand the treatment" and rarely reducing themselves to pastiches of "the grownup American pop of Glen Campbell's collaborations with Jimmy Webb or Harry Nilsson's [recordings] of 'Everybody's Talkin'' and 'I Guess the Lord Must Be in New York City'." Writing in The Guardian, Petridis hoped Springsteen will "take more stylistic detours in the future", as "it adds up to an album that manages to be both unexpected and of a piece with its author’s back catalogue."

Some reviewers had reservations about the album. In his "Consumer Guide" column, Robert Christgau deemed it a worthy effort and cited its highlights as "Tucson Train" and "Moonlight Motel". However, he believed Springsteen was trying to put across the message that "America used to be better", which the critic said brings to question in what manner will fans receive the musician's nostalgia for America's past: "How many of his faithful will blame it on the rich and how many on the young?" Ludovic Hunter-Tilney issued different complaints in his review for the Financial Times, being especially critical of the record's roots rock and orchestral pop setting. "The combination of twanging western rock and orchestra has a confected, forced feel", he said, adding that "the effect is intended to dignify the lives of the hard-bitten individuals in his lyrics, but instead it sounds like they are being smothered by overbearing string and horn arrangements."

== Track listing ==
All tracks are written by Bruce Springsteen.

Western Stars track listing
No.	Title	Length
1.	"Hitch Hikin'"	3:37
2.	"The Wayfarer"	4:18
3.	"Tucson Train"	3:31
4.	"Western Stars"	4:41
5.	"Sleepy Joe's Café"	3:14
6.	"Drive Fast (The Stuntman)"	4:16
7.	"Chasin' Wild Horses"	5:03
8.	"Sundown"	3:17
9.	"Somewhere North of Nashville"	1:52
10.	"Stones"	4:44
11.	"There Goes My Miracle"	4:05
12.	"Hello Sunshine"	3:56
13.	"Moonlight Motel"	4:16
Total length:		51:00

The film version has the same track list, with the addition of the cover song "Rhinestone Cowboy".

== Personnel ==
=== Musicians ===
- Bruce Springsteen – vocals, acoustic guitar, glockenspiel, synth strings, banjo, percussion, electric guitar, B3, piano, orchestral samples, celeste, organ solo, 12-string guitar, Mellotron
- Patti Scialfa – vocals (tracks 2, 8, 9, 11), vocal arrangement (tracks 2, 8, 9, 11)
- Ron Aniello – upright bass, piano, electric guitar, percussion, vibraphone, bass guitar, synth strings, orchestral samples, acoustic guitar, drums, B3, celeste, loops, synth, background vocal
- Charlie Giordano – accordion (track 5), piano (track 9)
- David Sancious – piano (track 2), B3 (track 6)
- Matt Rollings – piano (tracks 3, 4, 8, 13)
- Jon Brion – drums (track 13), timpani (tracks 10, 11), electric guitar (track 4), Moog (track 4, 5, 11), Farfisa (track 5), celeste (track 13)
- Gunnar Olsen – drums (tracks 3, 5, 6, 8, 10, 11)
- Matt Chamberlain – drums (track 2, 4, 12)
- Marc Muller – lap steel (track 4), pedal steel (tracks 6, 7, 12)
- Rob Lebret – electric guitar (track 4), baritone guitar (track 4)
- Marty Rifkin – pedal steel (track 9)
- Greg Leisz – pedal steel (track 13)
- Lenny Castro – conga (tracks 4, 5), tambourine (tracks 4, 11), shaker (tracks 5, 11)
- Toby Scott – loop (track 3), programming (track 3)
- Soozie Tyrell – background vocal (tracks 2, 8, 9), violin (track 9)
- Michelle Moore – background vocal (tracks 4, 11)
- Curtis King – background vocal (track 4)
- Cindy Mizelle – background vocals (track 4)
- Matthew Koma – background vocal (track 11)
- Curt Ramm – trumpet (tracks 2–5, 8, 11), flugelhorn (track 2)
- Barry Danielian – trumpet (tracks 3–5, 7, 8, 11)
- Clark Gayton – trombone (tracks 5, 8, 11)
- Dan Levine – trombone (tracks 3, 4)
- Ed Manion – saxophone (track 5)
- Rachel Drehmann – French horn (tracks 2–4, 7, 10)
- Leelanee Sterrett – French horn (tracks 2–4, 7, 10)
- Alden Banta – bassoon (tracks 3, 4)
- Andrew Sterman – alto flute (tracks 3, 4)
- Charles Pillow – oboe (tracks 3, 4)
- Luis Villalobos – violin (track 6, 10)
- Avatar Strings (tracks 1, 7, 8, 10, 12):
  - Rob Mathes – conductor, arranger
  - Sandy Park – contractor
  - Lisa Kim (concertmaster), Hyunju Lee, Joanna Maurer, Sharon Yamada, Annaliesa Place, Suzanne Ornstein, Liz Lim, Jung Sun Yoo, Emily Popham – violins
  - Robert Rinehart, Vivek Kamath, Desiree Elsevier – violas
  - Alan Stepansky, Nathan Vickery – cellos
- Stone Hill Strings (tracks 2–4, 6, 11):
  - Scott Tibbs – conductor
  - Sandy Park – contractor
  - Lisa Kim (concertmaster), Hyunju Lee, Joanna Maurer – violins
  - Shmuel Katz, Rebecca Young – violas
  - Alan Stepansky – cello

=== Technical ===
- Ron Aniello, Bruce Springsteen – production
- Rob Lebret, Ross Petersen, Toby Scott, Ron Aniello – engineering
- Brett Rouche, Greg Koller, Alec Dixon, Rob Lebret, Ross Petersen, Chris Steffen – additional engineering
- James Brown – additional engineering (track 9)
- Tom Elmhirst – mixing
  - Joe Visciano – assistant
- Bob Ludwig – mastering
- Toby Scott – production coordinator
- Shari Sutcliffe – musician contractor
- Kevin Buell – guitars and technical services
- Michelle Holme – art and design
- Kalle Gustafsson (Trunk Archive) – cover photography
- Danny Clinch – additional photography

== Charts ==
=== Weekly charts ===
Weekly chart performance for Western Stars
Chart (2019)	Peak position
Australian Albums (ARIA)	1
Austrian Albums (Ö3 Austria)	1
Belgian Albums (Ultratop Flanders)	1
Belgian Albums (Ultratop Wallonia)	3
Canadian Albums (Billboard)	4
Croatian International Albums (HDU)	1
Czech Albums (ČNS IFPI)	9
Danish Albums (Hitlisten)	4
Dutch Albums (Album Top 100)	1
Finnish Albums (Suomen virallinen lista)	3
French Albums (SNEP)	3
German Albums (Offizielle Top 100)	1
Greek Albums (IFPI)	3
Hungarian Albums (MAHASZ)	16
Irish Albums (IRMA)	1
Italian Albums (FIMI)	1
Japanese Albums (Oricon)	16
New Zealand Albums (RMNZ)	1
Norwegian Albums (VG-lista)	1
Polish Albums (ZPAV)	12
Portuguese Albums (AFP)	1
Scottish Albums (Official Charts)	1
Slovak Albums (ČNS IFPI)	26
Spanish Albums (Promusicae)	1
Swedish Albums (Sverigetopplistan)	3
Swiss Albums (Schweizer Hitparade)	1
UK Albums (Official Charts)	1
US Billboard 200	2
US Top Rock Albums (Billboard)	1

=== Year-end charts ===
Year-end chart performance for Western Stars
Chart (2019)	Position
Australian Albums (ARIA)	59
Austrian Albums (Ö3 Austria)	25
Belgian Albums (Ultratop Flanders)	17
Belgian Albums (Ultratop Wallonia)	62
Dutch Albums (Album Top 100)	46
French Albums (SNEP)	85
German Albums (Offizielle Top 100)	29
Irish Albums (IRMA)	15
Spanish Albums (PROMUSICAE)	19
Swedish Albums (Sverigetopplistan)	37
Swiss Albums (Schweizer Hitparade)	18
UK Albums (OCC)	35
US Top Rock Albums (Billboard)	60
Worldwide Albums (IFPI)	16

== Certifications ==
Certifications for Western Stars
Region	Certification	Certified units/sales
France (SNEP)	Gold	50,000^{‡}
Germany (BVMI)	Gold	100,000^{‡}
Italy (FIMI)	Platinum	50,000^{‡}
Spain (Promusicae)	Gold	20,000^{‡}
United Kingdom (BPI)	Gold	100,000^{‡}
^{‡} Sales+streaming figures based on certification alone.

== Film ==
It was announced on July 23, 2019, that Springsteen would world premiere his co-directed film, Western Stars, at the 2019 Toronto International Film Festival. The film marks the first directing credit for Springsteen and was co-directed by his longtime collaborator Thom Zimny. The film features Springsteen and his backing band and orchestra performing the music from the album to a live audience. The live performances were filmed during two nights in April 2019 in a historic barn on the artist's property, the outdoor sequences were filmed at Joshua Tree National Park.

Cameron Bailey, artistic director of the festival, said of the film, "We have Bruce Springsteen's directorial debut at the festival, I think he's got a big future ahead of him. It's largely performance, but there is a framing to it. It's very filmic, which is what attracted me. The album and the film are both about this fading Western movie B-level star who's looking back on his life and the decisions he's made. That narrative and that character shape all the songs. In between the songs, you've got Bruce really talking about this character he invented, the story he wrote for the character, and how it reflects back on his own life as he ages and other kind of narratives he's had in his previous albums."

Warner Bros. Pictures released the film on October 25, 2019. The companion soundtrack for the movie, titled Western Stars – Songs from the Film, was released on the same day by Columbia Records. It grossed $3.7 million worldwide.

Western Stars – Songs from the Film

Soundtrack album by Bruce Springsteen
- Released: October 25, 2019
- Recorded: April 2019
- Studios: Stone Hill Farm, Colts Neck, New Jersey
- Length: 57:04
- Label: Columbia
- Producers: Ron Aniello, Bruce Springsteen

Singles from Western Stars – Songs from the Film
- 1. "Sundown" Released: October 4, 2019

Western Stars – Songs from the Film track listing
No.	Title	Writer(s)	Length
1.	"Hitch Hikin'"		3:43
2.	"The Wayfarer"		4:45
3.	"Tucson Train"		3:21
4.	"Western Stars"		4:39
5.	"Sleepy Joe's Café"		3:41
6.	"Drive Fast (The Stuntman)"		4:42
7.	"Chasin' Wild Horses"		5:46
8.	"Sundown"		3:12
9.	"Somewhere North of Nashville"		1:59
10.	"Stones"		5:35
11.	"There Goes My Miracle"		4:00
12.	"Hello Sunshine"		4:22
13.	"Moonlight Motel"		4:01
14.	"Rhinestone Cowboy"	Larry Weiss	3:18
Total length:			57:04

=== Charts ===
Chart performance for Western Stars – Songs from the Film
Chart (2019)	Peak position
US Billboard 200	141

== Twilight Hours outtakes ==
On June 27, 2025, Springsteen released the 83-track boxset Tracks II: The Lost Albums. Twelve songs that were left off of Western Stars are featured on an album in the box set titled Twilight Hours. “At one time it was either a double record [with Western Stars] or they were part of the same record. I love Burt Bacharach and I love those kinds of songs and those kinds of songwriters. I took a swing at it because the chordal structures and everything are much more complicated, which was fun for me to pull off. All this stuff could have come right off of those Sixties albums” Springsteen said. On June 12, 2025, Springsteen released the song "Sunday Love" as a promotional single. The song "I'll Stand By You" was previously featured on the 2019 soundtrack for the movie Blinded by the Light and was released as a promotional single with a music video.

Tracks II: The Lost Albums (Twilight Hours)

Box set by Bruce Springsteen
- Released: June 27, 2025
- Label: Columbia
- Producers: Ron Aniello, Bruce Springsteen

Singles from Tracks II: The Lost Albums (Twilight Hours)
- 1. "I'll Stand By You" Released: August 22, 2019; 2. "Sunday Love" Released: June 12, 2025

All tracks are written by Bruce Springsteen.

Tracks II: The Lost Albums (Twilight Hours) track listing
No.	Title	Length
1.	"Sunday Love"	5:16
2.	"Late in the Evening"	4:44
3.	"Two of Us"	5:10
4.	"Lonely Town"	6:38
5.	"September Kisses"	3:32
6.	"Twilight Hours"	3:23
7.	"I'll Stand By You"	4:37
8.	"High Sierra"	6:25
9.	"Sunliner"	3:05
10.	"Another You"	5:19
11.	"Dinner at Eight"	4:09
12.	"Follow the Sun"	3:36
