= Letter to You (song) =

Bruce Springsteen song

Single by Bruce Springsteen and the E Street Band

from the album Letter to You
- Released: September 10, 2020
- Studio: Thrill Hill Recording, Colts Neck, New Jersey, United States
- Genre: Rock; heartland rock
- Length: 4:55
- Label: Columbia
- Songwriter: Bruce Springsteen
- Producers: Ron Aniello; Bruce Springsteen

Bruce Springsteen and the E Street Band singles chronology
"Western Stars" (2019)	"Letter to You" (2020)	"Ghosts" (2020)

Music video
- Letter to You on Youtube.com

"Letter to You" is a 2020 single by American heartland rock band Bruce Springsteen and the E Street Band. The song was released as a lead-in for the album of the same name on September 10, 2020. The song has received critical praise.

== Critical reception ==
Kory Grow of Rolling Stone situates the song as part of a tradition in Springsteen's songwriting with his trademark earnestness and urgency but notes that, "Springsteen sings about exploring his inner self without truly divulging all that much... [and] Springsteen may never fully reveal himself, but the song still feels like a full picture because of the way he and his bandmates trust in themselves and each other musically." Dylan Jones of GQ considers the song epic and uses his review as an overview of Springsteen's career in combining strong storytelling in his songs with his shifts in musical genre, including "the poppy vein of his recent" work.

Sam Sodomsky of Pitchfork Media calls the song "a heartfelt tribute to those ties that bind", noting how Springsteen's work with the E Street Band "is his conduit toward transcendence, community, and emotional uplift" and how those qualities are particularly needed in the present day. Writing for NJ.com, Bobby Olivier ranked 326 Bruce Springsteen songs, with this one coming in at 161 for being "familiarly forceful and earnest" and "strong, catchy and bodes well for the highly anticipated album coming".

== Personnel ==
Bruce Springsteen and the E Street Band

- Roy Bittan – keyboards
- Charles Giordano – organ
- Nils Lofgren – guitar
- Patti Scialfa – guitar, backing vocals
- Bruce Springsteen – guitar, vocals, production
- Garry Tallent – bass guitar
- Steven Van Zandt – guitar
- Max Weinberg – drums

Technical personnel

- Ron Aniello – production
- Bob Clearmountain – mixing
- Bob Ludwig – mastering

== Charts ==
Chart performance for "Letter to You"
Chart (2020)	Peak position
Belgium (Ultratip Bubbling Under Flanders)	12
Belgium (Ultratip Bubbling Under Wallonia)	37
Canada Rock (Billboard)	49
Sweden (Sverigetopplistan)	98
US Hot Rock & Alternative Songs (Billboard)	34
US Rock & Alternative Airplay (Billboard)	28
US Adult Alternative Airplay (Billboard)	1
