= Ghosts (Bruce Springsteen song) =

2020 single by Bruce Springsteen

Single by Bruce Springsteen and the E-Street Band

from the album Letter to You
- Released: September 24, 2020
- Studio: Thrill Hill Recording, Colts Neck, New Jersey, United States
- Genre: Rock; hard rock; heartland rock
- Length: 5:54
- Label: Columbia
- Songwriter: Bruce Springsteen
- Producers: Ron Aniello; Bruce Springsteen

Bruce Springsteen and the E-Street Band singles chronology
"Letter to You" (2020)	"Ghosts" (2020)	"Chinatown" (2020)

Music video
- Ghosts on Youtube.com

"Ghosts" is a 2020 single by American rock band Bruce Springsteen and the E Street Band. The song was released as the second single for Springsteen's then forthcoming album Letter to You on September 24, 2020. A music video for the single was also released.

== Description ==
It has been described as a song about the "beauty and joy of being in a band and the pain of losing one another to illness and time". Besides being a salute to lost bandmates and a love letter to rock, Rolling Stone describes "Ghosts" as a probable future live favorite when concerts resume, and sounding like a "revved-up version of rockers from The River, such as "Two Hearts". The official music video features visual references to George Theiss, Clarence Clemons and Danny Federici.

== Release history ==
Release formats for "Ghosts"
Region	Date	Format	Label
Various	September 24, 2020	Digital download; streaming	Columbia
United Kingdom	September 26, 2020	Adult contemporary	Sony

== Charts ==
Sales chart performance for "Ghosts"
Chart (2020)	Peak position
US Rock Digital Song Sales (Billboard)	5
US Rock & Alternative Airplay (Billboard)	49
