= Letter to You =

Studio album by Bruce Springsteen and the E Street Band
- Released: October 23, 2020
- Recorded: November 2019
- Studios: Thrill Hill Recording, Colts Neck, New Jersey
- Genres: Rock; rock and roll; heartland rock
- Length: 58:17
- Label: Columbia
- Producers: Ron Aniello; Bruce Springsteen

Bruce Springsteen chronology
Western Stars (2019)	Letter to You (2020)	The Legendary 1979 No Nukes Concerts (2021)

Bruce Springsteen and the E Street Band chronology
Chapter and Verse (2016)	Letter to You (2020)	The Legendary 1979 No Nukes Concerts (2021)

Singles from Letter to You
- 1. "Letter to You" Released: September 10, 2020; 2. "Ghosts" Released: September 24, 2020

Letter to You is the twentieth studio album by the American singer-songwriter Bruce Springsteen. Released in October 2020, it was Springsteen's first new studio album with the E Street Band to be released since 2014's High Hopes. Letter to You was met with widespread critical acclaim; critics responded favorably to the album's treatment of issues of aging and death. The album was a commercial success, topping several international sales charts and was Springsteen's 21st top-10 album in the United States and made Springsteen the first ever artist with top five-charting albums in each of the last six decades. Since touring was not possible due to the COVID-19 pandemic, the album was promoted with an online radio station, music videos, and a custom Twitter emoji.

== Recording and release ==
"It's the only album where it's the entire band playing at one time, with all the vocals and everything completely live. The record is the first record that I've made where the subject is the music itself... It's about popular music. It's about being in a rock band, over the course of time. And it's also a direct conversation between me and my fans, at a level that I think they've come to expect over the years."

— Springsteen, on recording Letter to You

Springsteen assembled the E Street Band at his home studio for five days of recording in November 2019 but finished after just four. The recordings were produced by Ron Aniello and Springsteen. The recording of Letter to You occurred after a period of writer's block that Springsteen experienced; the writer's block was dispelled over the course of a week-and-a-half of intense songwriting in April 2019 that was inspired in part by the death of Springsteen's former bandmate, George Theiss. The lyrics discuss themes of regret, aging and dying. The album was recorded live in studio with no demos and only minimal overdubs (such as guitar solos, handclaps and backing vocals). It features three tracks originally written prior to Springsteen's 1973 debut album, Greetings from Asbury Park, N. J.: "If I Was the Priest", "Janey Needs a Shooter" and "Song for Orphans". Springsteen came across earlier recordings of these songs with John Hammond while assembling a compilation album. "If I Was the Priest" has not previously been released by Springsteen, but was covered by Allan Clarke in the 1970s. Warren Zevon reworked "Janey Needs a Shooter" for his 1980 album Bad Luck Streak in Dancing School.

Photography for the cover and liner notes was captured by Danny Clinch in late 2018 as Springsteen was in New York City for his stage show Springsteen on Broadway.

The band had planned to tour in support of the album starting in early 2021 but those plans were disrupted by the COVID-19 pandemic; by the time of the release, Springsteen estimated that the earliest they could perform live would be 2022. E Street drummer Max Weinberg continued touring with his group Max Weinberg's Jukebox and used those dates to promote Letter to You. Springsteen considers the decision to not tour "very painful," as he looks forward to presenting the new material in a live context but he made promotional appearances on The Late Show with Stephen Colbert and The Late Late Show to introduce the music to new audiences.

The release was announced on September 10, with a music video for the lead single "Letter to You" published simultaneously. Streaming audio and a music video for "Ghosts" followed on September 24. A documentary on making the album directed by Thom Zimny came out via Apple TV+ on October 23.

An emoji in the shape of Springsteen was released via Twitter to promote the album on October 14. Apple Music hosted Letter to You Radio, a channel where Springsteen interviews fellow musicians such as Brandon Flowers, Dave Grohl, and Eddie Vedder, along with political discussion from guests such as Jon Stewart.

On November 23, 2020, a lyric video for "The Power of Prayer" was released.

Bruce Springsteen and the E Street Band performed "Ghosts" and "I'll See You in My Dreams" on the December 12, 2020 episode of Saturday Night Live marking the band's first performance since 2017 and its first to promote Letter to You. Bassist Garry Tallent and violinist Soozie Tyrell opted to remain home due to COVID-19 travel concerns. Jack Daly of the Disciples of Soul filled in for Tallent.

== Critical reception ==
Ratings for Letter to You
Aggregate scores
Source	Rating
AnyDecentMusic?	8.0/10
Metacritic	88/100
Review scores
Source	Rating
AllMusic	4.5/5 stars
The A.V. Club	5/5 stars
Clash	8/10
Consequence of Sound	B+
The Daily Telegraph	5/5 stars
The Independent	5/5 stars
musicOMH	4/5 stars
NME	5/5 stars
Pitchfork	7.4/10
Rolling Stone	4/5 stars

According to the review aggregator Metacritic, Letter to You received "universal acclaim" based on a weighted average score of 88 out of 100 from 25 critic scores. With 35 reviews, aggregator Album of the Year considers critical consensus as an 82 out of 100 and AnyDecentMusic? sums up 27 critics with an 8.0 out of 10.

Alex McLevy of The A.V. Club gave the album an A rating, calling it "one of the finest achievements of Bruce Springsteen’s career" for the songwriting's profound look at loss and the fact that listeners can hold up "nearly any track as a microcosm of its overall scope". Kory Grow of Rolling Stone awarded this four out of five stars for Springsteen's deep ability to express his emotions in the "self-therapy" of the lyrics and sums up the music as "the sound of Springsteen accepting that for himself". Richard Williams of Uncut devotes a lengthy review of Letter to You that places it in the context of Springsteen's career as a milestone release that is ultimately about Springsteen, his relationship with his band, and their relationship with the audience, particularly in their ability to interpret American culture, history, and politics; he gives it a nine out of 10. Mojo also published a long review of this album, with Keith Cameron giving it four out of five stars, comparing this album to several that Springsteen has released across his career, noting that the musicianship keeps the album from being overly sentimental. Writing for the Associated Press, David Bauder has a mixed take on the material, noting how it's ironic that the composer of "Glory Days" spends so much time looking back and while Springsteen "is not, by any means, a nostalgia act", between this album and his Broadway show, his current output "is less about pulling out of here to win than pulling back in to appreciate what he has"; the review praises some songs but notes that Springsteen sometimes slips into cliché.

In The Wall Street Journal, Mark Richardson considers Letter to You a concept album about music's ability to give life meaning and points out how it closes a chapter on Springsteen's career. Dan DeLuca of The Philadelphia Inquirer also considers the songs "life-affirming", giving it 3.5 out of four stars. Robin Murray of Clash writes that listening to the album is a "moving experience" and rates it an eight out of 10. In The Daily Telegraph, Neil McCormick gave this five out of five stars for being "a celebration of performing music; a roar against the silence enveloping the world". Another five-star review by Helen Brown of The Independent declares the music so intimate that the musicians "feel so present and close that listeners might feel they’re violating the pandemic rules". NME's Leonie Cooper also gave the release five out of five, emphasizing the continuity present in this work that draws together themes across Springsteen's career. Chris Willman of Variety calls this "musical comfort food" and calls this and Western Stars the "high-water marks" of Springsteen's career since 2002's The Rising.

Sam Sodomsky of Pitchfork scored Letter to You a 7.4 out of 10, noting that Springsteen acts as a narrator on the album, "observing the ways that music can sustain us, with a tone pitched between deep reverence and loss... That simple but elusive power forms the thematic heart of the record, and it also informs the sound." Tyler Clark of Consequence of Sound gave the album a B+ for "boldly looking to the future", with a few tracks that are "plodding" or that "tip into schmaltz". The publication took this release as an opportunity to rank all of Springsteen's 20 studio albums, with Letter to You coming in at twelfth. In Spin, John Paul Bullock calls this "one of the warmest and most reassuring records of [Springsteen's] career", particularly with the accompanying documentary breaking down the recording process. In The Atlantic, David Brooks assess Letter to You as the musician's happiest album in decades as well as being "a sincere and vulnerable album" about the "art of ageing well".

The album is "eloquent" according to Ken Capobianco of The Boston Globe, who called the record "a celebration of life and a reminder of how rock ’n’ roll can help transcend grief and loss". Alexis Petridis of The Guardian named this the Album of the Week, giving it three out of five stars and tempering his review by calling this "a scaling down of ambition" but nonetheless a success. The publication devoted a second review from Kitty Empire who declared it her album of the week, with four out of five stars and calling it a "sledgehammer" of succor for its ability to process emotions of grief and providing uplift. Carl Wilson of Slate gives a positive review but asks "how many Bruce memoirs are too many" in light of Springsteen's recent stage show and book, noting that "songs that are fine on their own simply feel like they’re making the same point the one a couple of tracks ago did". The editorial staff of AllMusic gave Letter to You 4.5 out of five stars, with reviewer Stephen Thomas Erlewine noting that the performances have a connection with the performers' early material but with a "shared sense of warmth", calling this "a record that's a meditation on mortality into a celebration of what it means to be alive in the moment".

=== Accolades ===
Accolades for Letter to You
Issuer	Listing	Rank
Billboard	Top 50 Albums of 2020	34
Consequence of Sound	Top 50 Albums of 2020	33
Mojo	75 Best Albums of 2020	45
Metacritic	Best Albums of 2020	18
Rolling Stone	Top 50 Albums of 2020	12
Pitchfork	The 35 Best Rock Albums of 2020	—
Uncut	Top 75 Albums of 2020	20

== Commercial performance ==
Letter to You arrived at number 2 on Billboard 200, selling 96,000 units in its first week in the US, making Springsteen the first act with new top five-charting albums in each of the last six decades; this was also his 21st album in the top five. Springsteen tied John Mayer with the most spots topping the Top Rock Albums chart with five. On October 26, the Official Charts Company announced that Letter to You was at number one on the midweek album chart update, selling more than the next four best-selling albums combined, and was on course to become Springsteen's twelfth number-one album in the United Kingdom at the end of the chart week. This made Springsteen the first solo artist with a chart-topping album in the United Kingdom across five decades and fell to fourth place the following week. Springsteen and Madonna each have 12 number-one albums, tied at second place behind Elvis Presley's and Robbie Williams' 13. The ARIA charts had Letter to You as the artist's fifth number-one album in Australia.

Letter to You was the best-selling album in the United States the week it debuted (although it charted behind Luke Combs' re-release of What You See Is What You Get due to streaming and individual track sales), with 96,000 equivalent album units, including 92,000 album sales. By the second week, it had topped 117,000. First-week sales in the United Kingdom were 51,800 units, with 95% being physical product and downloads, narrowly behind Lady Gaga's Chromatica for most album sales in the debut week of 2020 (her album having 53,000). It was the fastest-selling album of 2020 to date and helped buoy vinyl LP sales in the fourth quarter with over 6,000 copies sold. In the United States, Letter to You had 78,631 album sales in its first week, including 18,000 on vinyl, making it the second best-selling vinyl album of the year to date behind The Slow Rush by Tame Impala. In Ireland, this was the fastest-selling album of 2020 to date, debuting atop the charts and leaving Springsteen tied with Eminem for most number one albums by a solo artist with nine.

The two singles anticipating the album, "Letter to You" and "Ghosts" charted at numbers 2 and 5 respectively on the Rock Digital Songs chart. Furthermore, Springsteen hit the second spot in the Artist 100 in early November.

== Bruce Springsteen's Letter to You ==
The real thing I wanted to do was to be a fly on the wall in that moment in that studio just capturing what’s going on, it’s a mystery when you think about it, the E Street Band – what do they do in the studio? It’s something that’s really powerful and magical...

— Zimny on his goal in filming the documentary Bruce Springsteen's Letter to You

Thom Zimny has worked with Bruce Springsteen for 20 years, documenting live performances, the making of albums, and other film work and the musician suggested that he film the recording of this album. Springsteen had no particular plan for Zimny's narrative or scope for the filming, but the duo decided on black-and-white early on in the process to reflect a "perfectly gray New Jersey day". The wintertime photography from Danny Clinch and the film's visual appearance as a common metaphor for themes in the lyrics, "which are reflection of the past and some of the spirituality that you find in the music". As the COVID-19 pandemic rolled out during the creation of the movie, Springsteen and Zimny finished working on it remotely.

IndieWire's David Ehrlich reviewed the documentary, characterizing it as a "rockin' meditation on death" which is also "an upbeat portrait of someone who isn't going anywhere, even when he leaves us"; he gave the film a B rating. In Time, Stephanie Zacharek also gave a positive assessment of the film, calling it "captivating" in its perspective on aging and as a retrospective on Springsteen's career. Consequence of Sound gave the documentary an A−, with reviewer Tyler Clark pointing out how the documentary focuses not only on this album but Springsteen's entire creative process and philosophy, including "his insights, mixed with his own already-secured legacy, offer a look inside the mind of a legend that’s valuable for anyone who also feels the pull of creativity". In The Morning Sun, Al Alexander More graded the film an A−, noting that Springsteen has laid out a template and wisdom for other musicians to follow.

In The Globe and Mail, Brad Wheeler gave the film 2.5 out of four stars for being "strikingly earnest" and a picture into the close camaraderie of the musicians but noting that it only works as a companion to the album and not as a film itself. CNN's Brian Lowry considers the movie a "Valentine" from Springsteen to his bandmates and their fans with "warmth and nostalgia [that] forges a link between the past and the present". NME supplemented their coverage of the album with another review by Leonie Cooper of the film, calling this a "grief-stricken contemplation on the fragility of life" that has pristine musical performances. Newsday's Robert Levin gave the film four out of four stars, calling it "joyful... magical and, yes... life affirming", noting that the album is also Springsteen's best in years.

== Track listing ==
No.	Title	Length
1.	"One Minute You're Here"	2:57
2.	"Letter to You"	4:55
3.	"Burnin' Train"	4:03
4.	"Janey Needs a Shooter"	6:49
5.	"Last Man Standing"	4:05
6.	"The Power of Prayer"	3:36
7.	"House of a Thousand Guitars"	4:30
8.	"Rainmaker"	4:56
9.	"If I Was the Priest"	6:50
10.	"Ghosts"	5:54
11.	"Song for Orphans"	6:13
12.	"I'll See You in My Dreams"	3:29

== Personnel ==
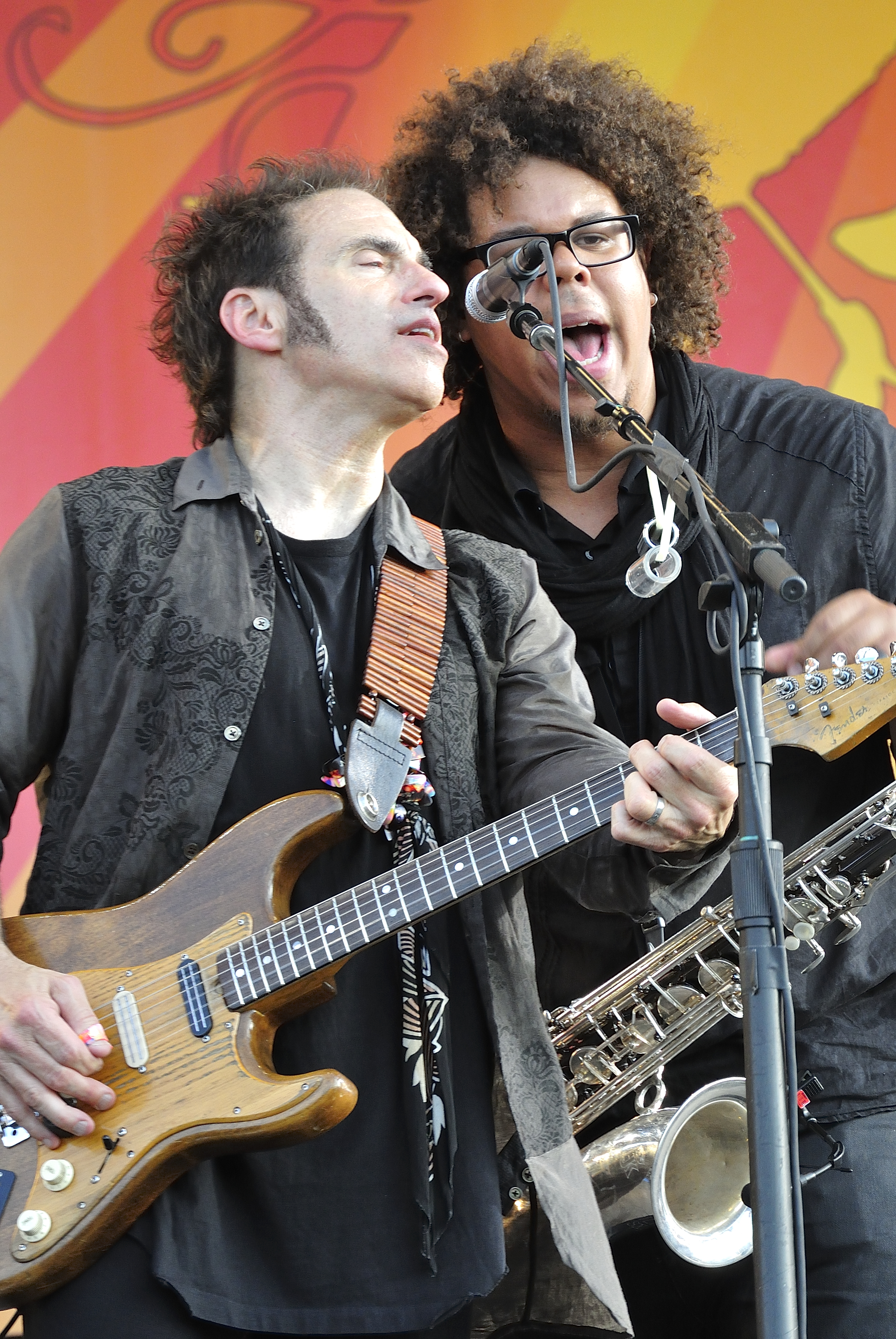
The E Street Band line-up for Letter to You includes veterans like guitarist Nils Lofgren (left), who joined in 1984 and newer members such as Jake Clemons (right), who started performing with them in 2012

Credits adapted from the album's liner notes.

Bruce Springsteen and the E Street Band

- Bruce Springsteen – vocals, guitar, harmonica
- Roy Bittan – piano, vocals
- Nils Lofgren – guitar, vocals
- Patti Scialfa – vocals
- Garry Tallent – bass guitar, vocals
- Steven Van Zandt – guitar, vocals
- Max Weinberg – drums, vocals
- Charles Giordano – organ, vocals
- Jake Clemons – saxophone

Technical personnel

- Ron Aniello, Bruce Springsteen – production
- Rob Lebret, Ross Petersen, Ron Aniello – engineering
- Toby Scott – additional engineering (tracks 1, 3, 8)
- Brandon Duncan – assistant engineering, digital editing
- Bob Clearmountain – mixing
- Rob Lebret – mixing (track 1)
- Bob Ludwig – mastering
- Kevin Buell – guitars and technical services
- Shari Sutcliffe – music contractor
- Michelle Holme – art direction
- Michelle Holme, Meghan Foley – design
- Dave Bett – hand lettering
- Danny Clinch – photography
- Rob DeMartin, Tyler Chappel – recording photography

== Charts ==
=== Weekly charts ===
Weekly chart performance for Letter to You
Chart (2020–2021)	Peak position
Australian Albums (ARIA)	1
Austrian Albums (Ö3 Austria)	1
Belgian Albums (Ultratop Flanders)	1
Belgian Albums (Ultratop)	3
Canadian Albums (Billboard)	2
Croatian International Albums (HDU)	1
Czech Albums (ČNS IFPI)	6
Danish Albums (Hitlisten)	1
Dutch Albums (Album Top 100)	1
Finnish Albums (Suomen virallinen lista)	2
French Albums (SNEP)	4
German Albums (Offizielle Top 100)	2
Greek Albums (IFPI)	4
Hungarian Albums (MAHASZ)	11
Irish Albums (OCC)	1
Italian Albums (FIMI)	1
Japanese Albums (Oricon)	23
New Zealand Albums (RMNZ)	1
Norwegian Albums (VG-lista)	1
Polish Albums (ZPAV)	6
Portuguese Albums (AFP)	1
Scottish Albums (OCC)	1
Slovak Albums (ČNS IFPI)	43
Spanish Albums (PROMUSICAE)	2
Swedish Albums (Sverigetopplistan)	1
Swiss Albums (Schweizer Hitparade)	1
UK Albums (OCC)	1
UK Americana Albums (OCC)	1
US Billboard 200	2
US Tastemakers (Billboard)	1
US Top Rock Albums (Billboard)	1

=== Year-end charts ===
2020 year-end chart performance for Letter to You
Chart (2020)	Position
Australian Albums (ARIA)	48
Austrian Albums (Ö3 Austria)	5
Belgian Albums (Ultratop Flanders)	17
Belgian Albums (Ultratop Wallonia)	42
Dutch Albums (Album Top 100)	18
French Albums (SNEP)	102
Irish Albums (IRMA)	9
Italian Albums (FIMI)	19
Spanish Albums (PROMUSICAE)	13
Swedish Albums (Sverigetopplistan)	41
Swiss Albums (Schweizer Hitparade)	4
UK Albums (OCC)	31
US Top Rock Albums (Billboard)	48

2021 year-end chart performance for Letter to You
Chart (2021)	Position
Belgian Albums (Ultratop Flanders)	154
German Albums (Offizielle Top 100)	73
Spanish Albums (PROMUSICAE)	90
Swiss Albums (Schweizer Hitparade)	67
US Top Rock Albums (Billboard)	63

== Certifications and sales ==
Certifications and sales for Letter to You
Region	Certification	Certified units/sales
France (SNEP)	Gold	50,000^{‡}
Germany (BVMI)	Gold	100,000^{‡}
Ireland	—	3,000
Italy (FIMI)	Platinum	50,000^{‡}
Spain (Promusicae)	Gold	20,000^{‡}
Sweden (GLF)	Gold	15,000^{‡}
Switzerland (IFPI Switzerland)	Gold	10,000^{‡}
United Kingdom (BPI)	Gold	100,000^{‡}
^{‡} Sales+streaming figures based on certification alone.

== See also ==
- List of 2020 albums
