= Land of Hope and Dreams =

Song by Bruce Springsteen

from the album Wrecking Ball
- A-side: "The Rising"
- Released: 2001, 2003, 2012, 2018
- Genre: Rock, gospel
- Label: Columbia
- Songwriter: Bruce Springsteen
- Producers: Ron Aniello, Bruce Springsteen

Music video
- Land of Hope and Dreams on Youtube.com

"Land of Hope and Dreams" is a 1999 song written by Bruce Springsteen and performed by Springsteen and the E Street Band. After being performed on tour and released on multiple live albums, a studio recording was released for the first time on Wrecking Ball in 2012.

The song was written prior to the 1999–2000 E Street Band reunion tour, and appeared on the Live in New York City album from that tour. It was also used as the theme song of the MLB on TBS coverage for the postseason in the 2012 Major League Baseball season.

== History ==
The song's origins date to 1998 or early 1999, when it was first written, although the mandolin riff first appeared on the song "Labor of Love" on Joe Grushecky's 1995 album American Babylon that Springsteen played on. It came during the close of a decade in which Springsteen had parted ways with the E Street Band, gotten married again and had children, and had released very little new music in a rock vein. He later said, "I was having a hard time locating my rock voice. I knew I didn't want it to be what it was, but I didn't know ... I'd made some records over the past years, I made one in '94 that I didn't release. Then I made a series of demos, kind of in search of that voice. And I was having a hard time finding it. And there was a point I said: 'Well, gee, maybe I just don't do that now. Maybe that's something that I did.'" But after writing "Land of Hope and Dreams", he felt it was "as good as any songs like this that I've ever written. It was like, there's that voice I was looking for."

The song was first heard by outsiders in March 1999 during preparations for the Bruce Springsteen and the E Street Band Reunion Tour. During a series of private rehearsals at Asbury Park, New Jersey's Convention Hall, several dozen of the Springsteen faithful, eager with anticipation at what the long-awaited reunion might bring, stood outside the hall on the cold and windy boardwalk and beach to hear what they could from inside the walls and reporting their findings on several Springsteen Internet forums. It was during one of these rehearsals that fans first heard run-throughs of what they called "The Train Song" or "This Train". When the first public rehearsal performance at Convention Hall was given on March 18, 1999, and then when the tour actually opened on April 9 at Barcelona's Palau Sant Jordi, the song became the tour's closing epic "Land of Hope and Dreams".

Indeed, the one newly written song to be featured during most of the tour, and closing the shows for much of it, was "Land of Hope and Dreams". Musically based in part around The Impressions' "People Get Ready", written by Curtis Mayfield, but set to a loud guitar churn with a sometimes-heard mandolin riff from Steven Van Zandt, lyrically it was a deliberate inversion of the traditional American gospel song first recorded in the 1920s, "This Train", also known as "This Train Is Bound for Glory". (The song is often associated with Woody Guthrie, as the inspiration for his 1943 autobiography Bound for Glory, but to music writer Dave Marsh, Springsteen's song was based more off of Sister Rosetta Tharpe's rendition.) In Springsteen's take, all are welcome on the train - not just "the righteous and the holy" of the original, but "saints and sinners", "losers and winners", "whores and gamblers" - you just get on board. Stretched to eight or more minutes, with several false endings, "Lohad" (as it soon became known to fans in shorthand) represented the culmination of the tour's message of rock and roll revival.

Well, you don't know where you're goin' now
But you know you won't be back

I said this train ...
Dreams will not be thwarted;
This train ...
Faith will be rewarded

Entertainment Weekly called the song "pure secular gospel", helping to promote the outing "as much [of a] traveling tent revival as reunion tour," and suggested that churches would be lucky to have as feverish an audience response as Springsteen received in his concerts.

While it was unusual for almost every show on the tour to end with a new, unreleased song, The New York Times felt it "was a very appropriate and telling conclusion to the show, a happy ending of sorts to the preceding tales of characters trying to navigate their way through a morally, financially and emotionally uncertain world, weighing their dreams against their reality and trying to decide which path to follow."

"Land of Hope and Dreams" represented a thematic strain in Springsteen's work. Author Louis P. Masur wrote that in a sense, the song represented a return to the motifs of the 1975 Born to Run album with the "But you know you won't be back" line, but that overall the song had a more optimistic view. Author Jimmy Guterman traced it back even further, to the all-is-forgiven, magical-city universe of 1973's "New York City Serenade", and forward to the 2002 album The Rising. Author Eric Alterman wrote that the song "somehow seemed to encapsulate twenty-five years of Springsteen songwriting" and in particular a moral from 1978's "Badlands": "It ain't no sin to be glad you're alive."

== 2000 live recording ==
"Land of Hope and Dreams" was recorded during a performance at Madison Square Garden on July 1, 2000. Running 9:22 in length, this rendition was featured on the HBO film Bruce Springsteen & The E Street Band: Live in New York City, first broadcast on April 7, 2001. As an audio recording, it was included on accompanying CD release of the same name, on March 27, 2001, which reached number five on the Billboard 200 U.S. album chart. In reviewing the release, Entertainment Weekly said that the song "is Springsteen at his most movingly idealistic, with a gospel train replacing the old, youthful promise of escape on a motorbike."

Following the September 11 attacks, the recording was included on the God Bless America charity album, released on October 16, 2001. The album, composed of a variety of patriotic, spiritual, and inspirational songs, debuted at number one on the Billboard 200.

The performance was included in the DVD release of Bruce Springsteen & The E Street Band: Live in New York City on November 6, 2001.

This live recording was reissued again as B-side for "The Rising" single in July 2002. Once more, it was included as the final track on the November 2003 compilation The Essential Bruce Springsteen, which reached number 14 on the Billboard 200 and number 28 on the UK Albums Chart.

== Subsequent live performance history ==
On the 2002–2003 Rising Tour, the second encore of shows was a thematic one that typically centered around "My City of Ruins", "Born in the U.S.A.", and a benedictory "Land of Hope and Dreams". A performance of the song at Palau Sant Jordi from this tour on October 16, 2002, while not part of a live television broadcast of the first half of the show, was included on the November 2003 Live in Barcelona DVD release.

The song was not played during the 2007–2008 Magic Tour, but returned during the first, North American leg of the 2009 Working on a Dream Tour. Those shows consistently featured "Land of Hope and Dreams" in the encore, immediately followed by Springsteen's other reunion-era encore epic of American struggle, survival and hope, "American Land". By now the usage of these songs had been so commonplace that The Philadelphia Inquirer wrote that the pair together "were spirited, even if they're starting to feel like overused leftovers from previous tours." Partway through the second, European leg of the tour, "Lohad" was dropped from the setlist, and appeared only rarely through the rest of the tour.

The song was performed during Jon Stewart's final episode of The Daily Show as Stewart's "Moment of Zen".

The Springsteen on Broadway acoustic live version was released as a single.

Springsteen, without any introduction, played "Land of Hope and Dreams" to opened a unique live-but-online national television concert to climax to the inauguration of President Joseph R. Biden as the 46th U.S. president, January 20, 2021. Since the COVID-19 pandemic was raging with some of its worst rates of new cases and death, and the Capitol had been attacked to contest Biden's election just 2 weeks before, the concert, called "Celebrating America" was a substitute for the traditional inaugural balls in Washington, DC. Springsteen performed solo in front of the Lincoln Memorial. Tom Hanks hosted the event, appearing and naming Springsteen and soon introduced President Biden, for remarks to the country.

== First studio version ==
A studio version may have been originally recorded in 2002 during the sessions for The Rising album, although if so, it was never released.

Springsteen's 17th studio album, Wrecking Ball, was released on March 6, 2012. Three songs previously only available as live versions, including "Land of Hope and Dreams", appear on the album. However, none of the studio work was able to include longtime saxophonist Clarence Clemons, who died in June 2011. For "Land of Hope and Dreams", producer Ron Aniello used a live recording of Clemon's saxophone solo and inserted it into a new studio recording. Springsteen commented that as he first heard the combined version being played back, "When the solo section hit, Clarence's sax filled the room. I cried."

That it was possibly Clemons' last appearance on a Springsteen album was seen as a tribute to the departed foil. Writer and broadcaster Will Hermes said, "It's an object lesson in the sort of hard-bitten pop optimism that Springsteen's made into a secular religion, and it's also a fitting farewell to a friend."

The track contains religious themes and more hopeful outlook with its uplifting lyrics and chorus that use an extensive train metaphor to express Springsteen's take on the American dream. "This train/dreams will not be thwarted/this train/faith will be rewarded," he sings. The song ends with a gospel choir singing excerpts from The Impressions' "People Get Ready" and Springsteen repeating "you just get on board/you just thank the Lord." Compared to its previous live version, which the E Street Band has been performing since 1999, it has been re-worked in a somewhat more compact version and now features electronic drums and the aforementioned use of a gospel choir.

Not everyone was pleased. The Washington Post wrote upon the album's release that "Land of Hope and Dreams" came across as a pose, and that "Cartoonishly austere American clichés, all aboard!" Similarly, Entertainment Weekly saw the song as having a similar issue as the rest of the album: "The images are so broad – every song's got a rising flood or a train of sinners or a dead man's moon – you'll be dying for a detail that's anchored in the real world, circa 2012." So did The Guardian: "There's something equally improbable about Wrecking Ball as a whole. On paper, it all looks a bit much, and occasionally it is – a sense of 'oh do give it a rest' sets in around the sixth overwrought minute of 'Land of Hope and Dreams' ...".

== Political, charitable, and other use ==
Going back to 2004, John Kerry had used "Land of Hope and Dreams" as introductory music for his presidential campaign, including at the July 2004 rally where he introduced John Edwards as his running mate.

It was also used as the theme song of the MLB on TBS coverage for the postseason in the 2012 Major League Baseball season.

Springsteen and the E Street Band performed "Land of Hope and Dreams" as the closing number of a one-hour telethon called Hurricane Sandy: Coming Together on November 2, 2012, which aired on NBC and many other channels. Rolling Stone commented that the song had by then "become the rock & roll ambassador's default tune for the dispossessed." On December 12, 2012, Springsteen and the E Street Band opened the 12-12-12: The Concert for Sandy Relief benefit with the same song, presenting what the Associated Press called "a roar and call to arms".

Rock writer and Springsteen biographer Dave Marsh calls one of his Sirius XM Radio shows the political talk show Live From the Land of Hopes and Dreams, airs Sunday afternoons on Sirius Left, channel 146 and America Left, channel 167 on XM Satellite Radio.

Springsteen and the E Street Band performed the song on the final episode (Stewart's final 'Moment of Zen') of The Daily Show with Jon Stewart in 2015.

A recording of the song was played after the end of President Barack Obama's farewell address in January 2017.

In the live performance of this song on 27 January 2017 at the Perth Arena, Springsteen added the line "this train carries immigrants". At the time Donald Trump was reviewing his stance on immigration from Muslim countries.

The song, performed by Bruce Springsteen alone on an acoustic guitar, opened the Biden Inaugural Committee's television special, “Celebrating America”, which was broadcast on NBC, ABC, CBS, PBS, CNN and streaming on various websites, the evening of January 20, 2021, after the daytime events surrounding the inauguration of U.S. President Joseph R. Biden.

It was also played at the end of former President Barack Obama's speech at the 2024 Democratic National Convention on the night of August 20.

== Death of Clarence Clemons ==
In an interview with Howard Stern, Bruce stated that he had performed the song acoustically for Clarence Clemons in the hospital room prior to Clarence's death.

"I had a feeling he could hear me because he could squeeze your hand. When I first went to see him, there was some response to your voice and to you being in the room it felt like so I took a hunch. I knew he was going to die and so I brought the guitar in and strummed a song called Land of Hope and Dreams."

The song was performed in the presence of Clarence's brother William and his nephew Jake, who is a current member of the E Street Band, as well as a couple other people.

== Charts ==
Billboard Digital Song Sales - #15

== See also ==
- List of train songs

== Bibliography ==
- Alterman, Eric (2001). It Ain't No Sin To Be Glad You're Alive: The Promise of Bruce Springsteen. Back Bay. ISBN 0-316-03917-9.
- Derkins, Susie (2002). Rock & Roll Hall of Famers: Bruce Springsteen. New York: Rosen Publishing Group. ISBN 0-8239-3522-1.
- Guterman, Jimmy (2005). Runaway American Dream: Listening to Bruce Springsteen. Cambridge, Massachusetts: Da Capo Press. ISBN 0-306-81397-1.
- Lewis, Greg; Sharkey, Moira (2009). Land of Hope and Dreams: Celebrating 25 Years of Bruce Springsteen In Ireland. Magic Rat Books. ISBN 978-0-9562722-0-1.
- Marsh, Dave (2006). Bruce Springsteen On Tour: 1968–2005. New York: Bloomsbury USA. ISBN 1-59691-282-0.
- Masur, Louis P. (2009). Runaway Dream: Born to Run and Bruce Springsteen's American Vision. New York: Bloomsbury Press. ISBN 978-1-60819-101-7.
- Statham, Craig (2013). Springsteen: Saint In The City: 1949-1974. London: Soundcheck Books. ISBN 978-0-9571442-3-1.
- Symynkywicz, Jeffery B. (2008). The Gospel According to Bruce Springsteen: Rock and Redemption, from Asbury Park to Magic. Louisville: Westminster John Knox Press. ISBN 978-0-664-23169-9.
