= The Essential Bruce Springsteen =

Greatest hits album by Bruce Springsteen
- Released: November 11, 2003
- Recorded: 1972–2002
- Genres: Rock; folk rock; heartland rock; roots rock
- Length: 3:21:01 (2003); 2:36:22 (2015)
- Label: Columbia

Bruce Springsteen chronology
The Rising (2002)	The Essential Bruce Springsteen (2003)	Devils & Dust (2005)

Bruce Springsteen and the E Street Band chronology
The Rising (2002)	The Essential Bruce Springsteen (2003)	Hammersmith Odeon, London '75 (2006)

The Essential Bruce Springsteen is a compilation album by Bruce Springsteen, released on November 11, 2003. The collection is part of a series of Essential sets released by Sony Music. It includes songs from various Springsteen albums and concerts up to the year 2003. A limited-edition third disc includes previously unreleased cuts, B-sides, contributions to soundtracks and benefit albums, covers, and an alternate, "country-blues" acoustic version of "Countin' on a Miracle" from The Rising (2002).

The album debuted on the Billboard 200 albums chart on November 29, 2003, at No. 14, with sales of 90,000 copies. The album was awarded gold and platinum records on December 16, 2003, by the RIAA. As of August 2013, the album has sold over 1,079,000 copies in the United States. It reached No. 15 on the UK Albums Chart in 2013. The album was re-released with an updated track listing in October 2015.

== Critical reception ==
Professional ratings
Review scores
Source	Rating
AllMusic	5/5 stars
Entertainment Weekly	A−
The Guardian	4/5 stars
Pitchfork	8.6/10

The album received general acclaim from music critics, who appreciated its inclusion of Springsteen's most recognizable hits throughout his career. AllMusic calls it a better compilation album than 1995's "misguided, haphazardly selected" Greatest Hits. In a Uncut magazine review, writer Chris Roberts writes that, while it does try to represent each of Springsteen's albums up until the release of the compilation, it does " too much communal air-punching, too little gentle introspection. Too much c'mon everybody, not enough leave me alone everybody.", noting that "this [compilation] obviously contains many absolutely storming songs, while begging you to question the omissions.", although he does believe it would have been "braver" to include one of the songs from his second album The Wild, the Innocent & the E Street Shuffle, highlighting "Candy's Room" and "Secret Garden" as options, Roberts concludes his review by noting that "The wordy babbling beatnik became The Boss then became understandably cautious, but when he loses himself and lets rip, to this day, thunder and lightning back off warily. Looking again at the track listing, this is a crazily great thing."

== Track listing ==
The Essential Bruce Springsteen track listing

2003 track order	Title	Original album	Length	2015 track order
—	"Growin' Up"	Greetings from Asbury Park, NJ (1973)	3:05	disc 1, track 01
disc 1, track 01	"Blinded by the Light"	Greetings from Asbury Park, NJ	5:04	—
disc 1, track 02	"For You"	Greetings from Asbury Park, NJ	4:40	—
disc 1, track 03	"Spirit in the Night"	Greetings from Asbury Park, NJ	5:00	—
disc 1, track 04	"4th of July, Asbury Park (Sandy)"	The Wild, the Innocent & the E Street Shuffle (1973)	5:37	disc 1, track 03
disc 1, track 05	"Rosalita (Come Out Tonight)"	The Wild, the Innocent & the E Street Shuffle	7:04	disc 1, track 02
disc 1, track 06	"Thunder Road"	Born to Run (1975)	4:51	disc 1, track 04
disc 1, track 07	"Born to Run"	Born to Run	4:33	disc 1, track 05
disc 1, track 08	"Jungleland"	Born to Run	9:36	—
—	"Tenth Avenue Freeze-Out"	Born to Run	3:11	disc 1, track 06
disc 1, track 09	"Badlands"	Darkness on the Edge of Town (1978)	4:05	disc 1, track 07
disc 1, track 10	"Darkness on the Edge of Town"	Darkness on the Edge of Town	4:31	—
disc 1, track 11	"The Promised Land"	Darkness on the Edge of Town	4:31	disc 1, track 08
—	"Prove It All Night"	Darkness on the Edge of Town	3:56	disc 1, track 09
disc 1, track 12	"The River"	The River (1980)	5:01	disc 1, track 10
disc 1, track 13	"Hungry Heart"	The River	3:21	disc 1, track 11
—	"The Ties That Bind"	The River	3:34	disc 1, track 12
—	"Out in the Street"	The River	4:20	disc 1, track 13
disc 1, track 14	"Nebraska"	Nebraska (1982)	4:30	—
disc 1, track 15	"Atlantic City"	Nebraska	3:57	disc 1, track 14
—	"Johnny 99"	Nebraska	3:41	disc 1, track 15
disc 2, track 01	"Born in the U.S.A."	Born in the U.S.A. (1984)	4:42	disc 1, track 17
disc 2, track 02	"Glory Days"	Born in the U.S.A.	4:17	disc 1, track 16
disc 2, track 03	"Dancing in the Dark"	Born in the U.S.A.	4:04	disc 1, track 18
disc 2, track 04	"Tunnel of Love"	Tunnel of Love (1987)	5:13	—
—	"Tougher Than the Rest"	Tunnel of Love	4:37	disc 2, track 01
disc 2, track 05	"Brilliant Disguise"	Tunnel of Love	4:16	disc 2, track 02
—	"One Step Up"	Tunnel of Love	4:22	disc 2, track 03
disc 2, track 06	"Human Touch"	Human Touch (1992)	6:31 (2003) / 5:11 (2015)	disc 2, track 04
disc 2, track 07	"Living Proof"	Lucky Town (1992)	4:48	—
disc 2, track 08	"Lucky Town"	Lucky Town	3:29	—
—	"Better Days"	Lucky Town	3:48	disc 2, track 05
—	"If I Should Fall Behind"	Lucky Town	2:58	disc 2, track 06
disc 2, track 09	"Streets of Philadelphia"	Philadelphia soundtrack (1994)	3:18	disc 2, track 07
—	"Murder Incorporated"	Greatest Hits (1995)	3:59	disc 2, track 08
disc 2, track 10	"The Ghost of Tom Joad"	The Ghost of Tom Joad (1995)	4:24	disc 2, track 09
disc 2, track 11	"The Rising"	The Rising (2002)	4:48	disc 2, track 10
disc 2, track 12	"Mary's Place"	The Rising	6:01	—
disc 2, track 13	"Lonesome Day"	The Rising	4:08	disc 2, track 11
disc 2, track 14	"American Skin (41 Shots)"	Bruce Springsteen & The E Street Band: Live in New York City (2001)	7:53	—
disc 2, track 15	"Land of Hope and Dreams"	Bruce Springsteen & The E Street Band: Live in New York City	9:22	—
-	"Devils & Dust"	Devils & Dust (2005)	5:03	disc 2, track 12
-	"Long Time Comin'"	Devils & Dust	4:17	disc 2, track 13
-	"Radio Nowhere"	Magic (2007)	3:21	disc 2, track 14
-	"Working on a Dream"	Working on a Dream (2009)	3:30	disc 2, track 15
-	"My Lucky Day"	Working on a Dream	4:02	disc 2, track 16
-	"The Wrestler"	Working on a Dream	3:51	disc 2, track 17
-	"We Take Care of Our Own"	Wrecking Ball (2012)	3:57	disc 2, track 18
-	"Hunter of Invisible Game"	High Hopes (2014)	4:42	disc 2, track 19

2003 bonus disc edition – disc three

No.	Title	Notes	Length
1.	"From Small Things (Big Things One Day Come)"	The River outtake	2:42
2.	"The Big Payback"	Nebraska outtake; B-side to "Open All Night" single	1:59
3.	"Held Up Without a Gun" (Live at Nassau Coliseum, Uniondale, New York, December 31, 1980)	Originally the B-side of "Hungry Heart"	1:21
4.	"Trapped" (Live at Meadowlands Arena, East Rutherford, New Jersey, August 6, 1984)	We Are the World, 1985	5:10
5.	"None But the Brave"	Born in the U.S.A. outtake	5:35
6.	"Missing"	The Crossing Guard soundtrack, 1995	5:04
7.	"Lift Me Up"	Limbo soundtrack, 1999	5:16
8.	"Viva Las Vegas"	"The Last Temptation Of Elvis" tribute album, 1990	3:10
9.	"County Fair"	Born in the U.S.A. outtake	4:51
10.	"Code of Silence" (Live at Madison Square Garden, New York City, Manhattan, New York, June 29, 2000)	Recorded live during the Reunion Tour	4:33
11.	"Dead Man Walkin'"	Dead Man Walking soundtrack, 1996	2:44
12.	"Countin' on a Miracle" (acoustic version)	Originally from The Rising	5:01
Total length:			47:26

== Charts ==
Chart (2003)	Peak position
Australian Top 50 Albums	43
Austrian Top 75 Albums	12
Belgium (Flanders) 100 Albums	19
Finnish Top 50 Albums	14
French Compilations	21
Irish Top 75 Albums	5
Italian Albums	8
Netherlands Top 100 Albums	22
Norwegian Top 40 Albums	4
Portuguese Top 30 Albums	13
Swedish Top 60 Albums	2
Swiss Top 100 Albums	35
UK Albums Chart	28
US Billboard 200	14

Chart (2004)	Peak position
Belgium (Wallonia) 100 Albums	84
Danish Top 40 Albums	17

Chart (2008)	Peak position
Spanish Top 100 Albums	77

Chart (2009)	Peak position
US Catalog Albums	13

Chart (2013)	Peak position
UK Albums Chart	15

Chart (2017)	Peak position
Australian Albums (ARIA)	41

== Certifications ==
Region	Certification	Certified units/sales
Australia (ARIA)	2× Platinum	140,000^{^}
Finland (Musiikkituottajat)	Gold	15,736
Italy (FIMI)	Gold	25,000^{‡}
Norway (IFPI Norway)	Platinum	40,000^{*}
Spain (Promusicae)	Gold	50,000^{^}
Sweden (GLF)	Gold	30,000^{^}
United Kingdom (BPI)	Platinum	300,000^{*}
United States (RIAA)	2× Platinum	1,079,000
^{*} Sales figures based on certification alone.^{^} Shipments figures based on certification alone.^{‡} Sales+streaming figures based on certification alone.
