= A MusiCares Tribute to Bruce Springsteen =

2014 film directed by Leon Knoles

- Directed by: Leon Knoles
- Starring: Bruce Springsteen & the E Street Band, Jon Stewart
- Distributed by: Columbia Records
- Release date: March 25, 2014
- Running time: 135 minutes
- Country: United States
- Language: English

A MusiCares Tribute to Bruce Springsteen is a concert video released on DVD, Blu-ray and Digital Download on March 25, 2014. It was filmed in 2013 at the MusiCares Person of the Year ceremony to honor and pay tribute to musician Bruce Springsteen for his artistic achievement in the music industry and dedication to philanthropy. The ceremony was hosted by Jon Stewart and features many performance by musicians who have long been fans and admirers of Springsteen's body of work. Springsteen and the E Street Band concluded the ceremony with their own performance.

== Track listing ==
1. "Adam Raised a Cain" (performed by Alabama Shakes)
2. "Because the Night" (performed by Patti Smith)
3. "Atlantic City (performed by Natalie Maines, Ben Harper and Charlie Musselwhite)
4. "American Land" (performed by Ken Casey of the Dropkick Murphys)
5. "My City of Ruins" (performed by Mavis Staples and Zac Brown)
6. "I'm on Fire" (performed by Mumford and Sons)
7. "American Skin (41 Shots)" (performed by Jackson Browne and Tom Morello)
8. "My Hometown" (performed by Emmylou Harris)
9. "One Step Up" (performed by Kenny Chesney)
10. "Streets of Philadelphia" (performed by Elton John)
11. "Hungry Heart" (performed by Juanes)
12. "Tougher Than the Rest" (performed by Tim McGraw and Faith Hill)
13. "The Ghost of Tom Joad" (performed by Jim James and Tom Morello)
14. "Dancing in the Dark" (performed by John Legend)
15. "Lonesome Day" (performed by Sting)
16. "Born in the U.S.A." (performed by Neil Young and Crazy Horse)
17. "We Take Care of Our Own" (performed by Bruce Springsteen and the E Street Band)
18. "Death to My Hometown" (performed by Bruce Springsteen and the E Street Band)
19. "Thunder Road" (performed by Bruce Springsteen and the E Street Band)
20. "Born to Run" (performed by Bruce Springsteen and the E Street Band)
21. "Glory Days" (performed by Bruce Springsteen and the E Street Band)
