= Live in Barcelona (Bruce Springsteen video) =

2003 documentary film directed by Chris Hilson

- Directed by: Chris Hilson
- Produced by: Jon Landau; Barbara Carr; George Travis
- Starring: Bruce Springsteen & the E Street Band
- Edited by: Thom Zimny
- Music by: Bruce Springsteen recorded and mixed by Brendan O'Brien
- Distributed by: Columbia Music Video
- Release date: November 18, 2003
- Running time: 180 minutes
- Country: Spain
- Language: English

Live In Barcelona is a full concert video DVD of a performance by Bruce Springsteen & the E Street Band of their Rising Tour performance of October 16, 2002, at Palau Sant Jordi in Barcelona, Catalonia, Spain.

The first half of the show was broadcast live at the time across Europe on MTV Europe and VH1 UK; the broadcast concluded with Springsteen's biggest hit, "Dancing in the Dark", unusually placed in the middle of the regular set for that reason. A tape of the broadcast was later aired by CBS in the United States on February 28, 2003, as well. The performance of "Waitin' on a Sunny Day" was released as a music video to promote the single.

Released on November 18, 2003, after the tour's conclusion and now incorporating the complete Barcelona performance, this DVD was the first time that an entire Springsteen concert was documented with an official release in either audio or video. Unlike the prior tour's concert video Bruce Springsteen & The E Street Band: Live in New York City, no equivalent audio-only album release was made (however, the concert did see release in the [[Bruce Springsteen Archives]] in October 2026)

== Contents ==
=== Disc one ===
1. "The Rising"
2. "Lonesome Day"
3. "Prove It All Night"
4. "Darkness on the Edge of Town"
5. "Empty Sky"
6. "You're Missing"
7. "Waitin' on a Sunny Day"
8. "The Promised Land"
9. "Worlds Apart"
10. "Badlands"
11. "She's the One"
12. "Mary's Place"
13. "Dancing in the Dark"
14. "Countin' on a Miracle"
15. "Spirit in the Night"
16. "Incident on 57th Street"
17. "Into the Fire"

=== Disc two ===
1. "Night"
2. "Ramrod"
3. "Born to Run"
4. "My City of Ruins"
5. "Born in the U.S.A."
6. "Land of Hope and Dreams"
7. "Thunder Road"
8. Drop the Needle and Pray: The Rising on Tour, a documentary featuring footage from shows on the Summer 2003 leg of the tour at Fenway Park and Giants Stadium, interviews with Springsteen and band members, and unpublished photographs.

== Personnel ==
As listed on the DVD cover:

The E Street Band

- Roy Bittan – keyboards
- Clarence Clemons – saxophone, percussion
- Danny Federici – keyboards, accordion
- Nils Lofgren – guitar, vocals
- Patti Scialfa – guitar, vocals
- Bruce Springsteen – guitar, vocals
- Garry Tallent – bass guitar
- Stevie Van Zandt – guitar, vocals
- Max Weinberg – drums
- with Soozie Tyrell – vocals, violin

== Charts ==
| Chart (2003) | Peak position |
|---|---|
| Australian DVDs Chart | 14 |
| Austrian Music DVDs Chart | 4 |
| German Albums Chart | 38 |
| US Music Videos Chart | 5 |

| Chart (2004) | Peak position |
|---|---|
| Belgian (Flanders) Music DVDs Chart | 10 |

== Certifications ==
| Region | Certification | Certified units/sales |
|---|---|---|
| Australia (ARIA) | 3× Platinum | 45,000^{^} |
| Austria (IFPI Austria) | Gold | 5,000^{*} |
| Denmark (IFPI Danmark) | Gold | 20,000^{^} |
| France (SNEP) | Gold | 10,000^{*} |
| Germany (BVMI) | Platinum | 50,000^{^} |
| Spain (Promusicae) | 2× Platinum | 50,000^{^} |
| Sweden (GLF) | Gold | 10,000^{^} |
| United States (RIAA) | 4× Platinum | 200,000^{^} |
^{*} Sales figures based on certification alone.^{^} Shipments figures based on certification alone.
