= Waitin' on a Sunny Day =

Single by Bruce Springsteen

from the album The Rising
- Released: April 22, 2003
- Recorded: Early 2002
- Studio: Southern Tracks Recording Studio, Atlanta, Georgia
- Genre: Rock; folk rock; R&B
- Length: 4:18
- Label: Columbia
- Songwriter: Bruce Springsteen
- Producer: Brendan O'Brien

Bruce Springsteen singles chronology
"Lonesome Day" (2002)	"Waitin' on a Sunny Day" (2003)	"Devils & Dust" (2005)

Music video
- "Waitin' on a Sunny Day" on YouTube

"Waitin' on a Sunny Day" is a song by the American singer-songwriter Bruce Springsteen that was first released in a recording with the E Street Band on his 2002 album, The Rising. Although the song was not released as a single in the United States, it was released as a single in Europe and was a hit in Sweden.

== History and themes ==
While many songs on The Rising were written in response to the September 11, 2001 attacks, "Waitin' on a Sunny Day" was written earlier. Springsteen wrote and recorded the song in 1998 or 1999, but that recording has not been released. On June 17, 1999, during the Bruce Springsteen and the E Street Band Reunion Tour, Springsteen and the band played the song for a soundcheck, but did not play it during any of the actual shows on the tour. The song was finally recorded again in Atlanta during the Rising sessions and was released on that album.

The song combines a simple, bouncy melody and arrangement powered by drums, acoustic guitars and Soozie Tyrell's violin with a lyric that describes optimism in a couple's relationship:

It's raining, but there ain't a cloud in the sky
Must have been a tear from your eye
Everything'll be okay ...

The words of the chorus are deliberately simple, to the consternation of some critics:

I'm waitin', waitin' on a sunny day,
Gonna chase the clouds away
Waitin' on a sunny day.

Instrumental breaks during the middle and end of the song feature Clarence Clemons's saxophone set against a glockenspiel and a backing vocal chorus singing "oohs" and "aahs".

Although "Waitin' on a Sunny Day" was written prior to the September 11 attacks, the song's theme of wanting to be happy again takes on additional meanings within the context of the album's explicitly themed September 11 songs. In his book The Gospel According to Bruce Springsteen, author Jeffrey Symynkywicz views the song as a reflection of the simpler world prior to September 11.

"Waitin' on a Sunny Day" is one of a few songs on The Rising that recall the E Street Band's R&B roots. Springsteen has described it as "a good example of pop songwriting" and also as the type of song he tends to "want to throw out...directly into the trash can" until former producer Jon Landau talks him out of it. Springsteen has also stated that he wrote the song in the style of Smokey Robinson.

== Release ==
Although the song was not released as a single in the United States, it was released as a single in Europe, and reached number 15 in Sweden. It also charted in Germany and the Netherlands.

It also charted in Australia. There, it was released as part of a four-track single:

1. "Waitin' on a Sunny Day" [studio version]
2. "Born to Run" [live]
3. "Darkness on the Edge of Town" [live]
4. "Thunder Road" [live]

The three live tracks were culled from 2000 Reunion Tour shows featured on the Bruce Springsteen & The E Street Band: Live in New York City DVD; the latter two had not appeared on the parallel Live in New York City CD release.

This four-track configuration was also released as an EP titled Waitin' on a Sunny Day in 2004.

Despite its success as a live track and hit status in Europe, it wasn't released on any Bruce Springsteen compilation album. However, it was released on the Bruce Springsteen Live Series album Songs of Summer. It is the most streamed track from its album on Spotify.

== Music video ==
A music video was released in 2002 although it was not of the studio version and instead the live performance from the DVD, Live in Barcelona.

== Live performances ==
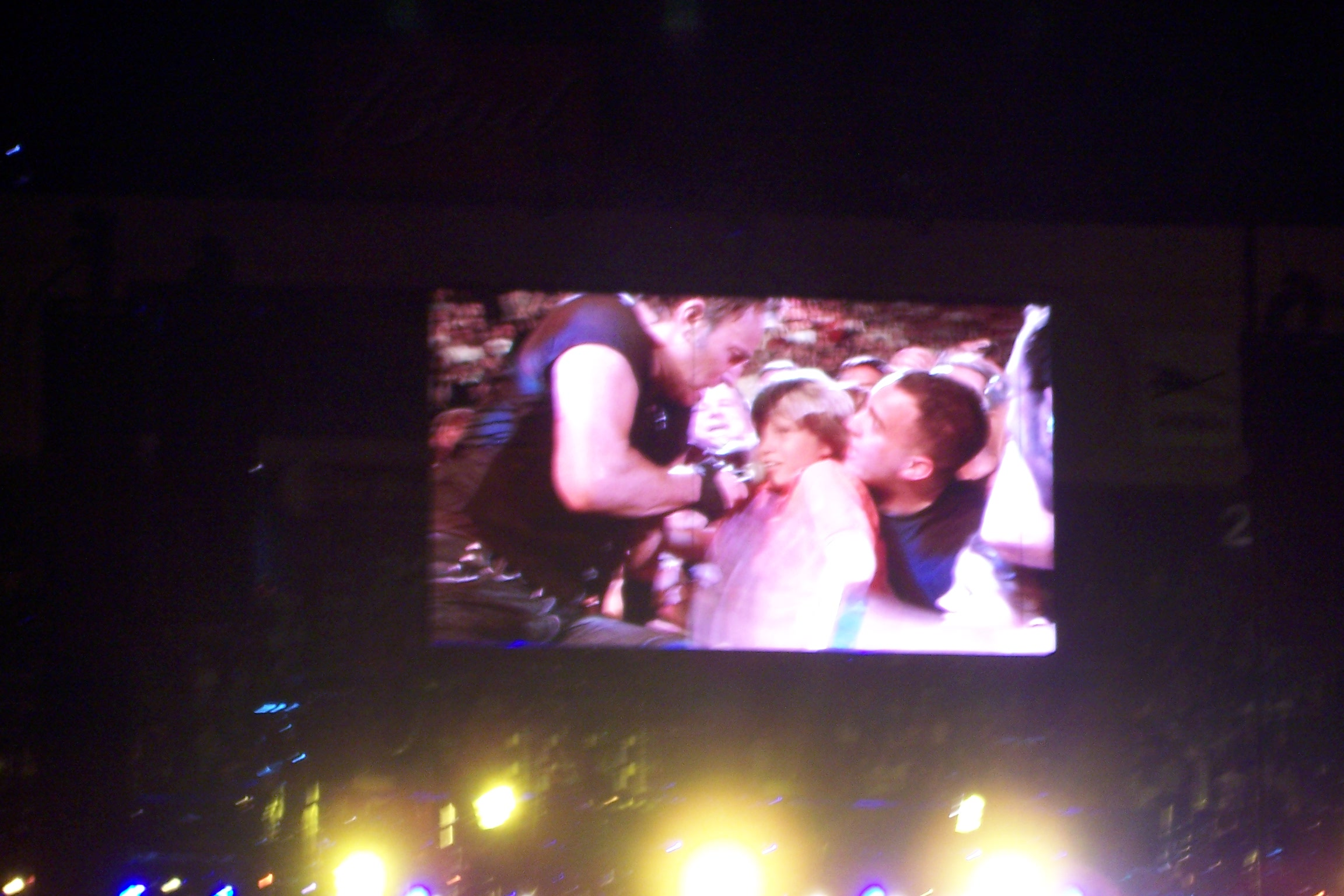
Springsteen lets a young child sing "Waitin' on a Sunny Day" during a May 21, 2009, Working on a Dream Tour show at the Izod Center in New Jersey. Yellow stage lighting frequently accompanies the song's performances.

The song has become a standout in concert performances by Springsteen and the E Street Band. It was a centerpiece of The Rising Tour, often played immediately after the somber "Empty Sky" and "You're Missing" to lift the crowd's spirits. From the beginning, his performances of it featured crowd interaction, with the song's simple chorus making it easy for the audience to assimilate and sing along en masse. A Rising Tour performance documented on the 2003 Live in Barcelona concert DVD features a rearranged, drum-less opening section, a chorus given to sideman Steve Van Zandt, and Springsteen walking along the front row of the pit and then stopping the band to allow the crowd to sing by itself.

"Waitin' on a Sunny Day" received a segment during Bruce Springsteen's appearance on the VH1 Storytellers television program in 2005 (later released on his VH1 Storytellers DVD), then appeared in a few encores during the subsequent 2005 solo Devils & Dust Tour. It was then played intermittently during Springsteen and the band's 2007–2008 Magic Tour.

It then resumed a full role during the 2009 Working on a Dream Tour, appearing in virtually all of the shows. Springsteen commonly picked out one or more youngsters from the front of the pit area and had them sing along on the song. Despite still being a "new" song compared to much of Springsteen's concert repertoire, it nonetheless got a strong audience response. One such performance was included on video on the London Calling: Live in Hyde Park concert DVD in 2010. Featuring drums, a Clemons baritone sax part and a Nils Lofgren slide guitar part all from the start, Springsteen played the song to the hilt, running along the front of the Hard Rock Calling audience (a general festival crowd that was not all Springsteen fans), encouraging and getting singalongs at every chorus, and getting a boy sitting on his parents' shoulders to sing. Youngster-featured performances continued as a staple of the 2012 Wrecking Ball Tour. However, the song's constant presence and predictable format in concerts (almost always toward the end of the main set, with a crowd sing-along and a child picked out from the pit to sing) have caused it to be widely disliked among hardcore fans, many of whom take a bathroom break each time it is played. In response, an employee in Shore Fire Media said, "The song and singalong is enjoyed by tens of thousands every night. We love our devoted fans who go to multiple shows, but they have to remember they are still a minority of the total audience."

== Chart performance ==
Weekly chart performance for "Waitin' on a Sunny Day"
Chart (2003)	Peak position
Australia (ARIA)	51
Germany (GfK)	85
Italy (FIMI)	27
Netherlands (Dutch Top 40)	41
Netherlands (Single Top 100)	46
Spain (Promusicae)	20
USA Adult Alternative Airplay	20
Sweden (Sverigetopplistan)	15
Quebec (ADISQ)	41
