= VH1 Storytellers (Bruce Springsteen album) =

- Directed by: Dave Diomedi
- Produced by: Jon Landau; Barbara Carr; George Travis; Bill Flanagan; Lee Rolontz
- Starring: Bruce Springsteen
- Edited by: Thom Zimny
- Music by: Bruce Springsteen
- Distributed by: VH1
- Release date: September 6, 2005
- Running time: 115 minutes
- Country: United States
- Language: English

VH1 Storytellers is a concert and discussion DVD by Bruce Springsteen, expanded from the airing of an episode of the VH1 television series VH1 Storytellers on April 23, 2005. Tied into promotion for his album Devils & Dust at the time, it was released in video form half a year later.

The filming for the program and video was done on April 4, 2005, at the newly opened Two River Theater in Red Bank, New Jersey. He played guitar and piano and sang as he dissected his songs for meaning, sometimes line by line, frequently confessing at the end that his analysis was cooked for the show and that his original writing had been more subconscious. Wife Patti Scialfa contributed the occasional helping vocal. A question and answer session with contest winning audience members also ensued.

== Songs performed and discussed ==
1. "Devils & Dust"
2. "Blinded by the Light"
3. "Brilliant Disguise"
4. "Nebraska"
5. "Jesus Was an Only Son"
6. "Waitin' on a Sunny Day"
7. "The Rising"
8. "Thunder Road"

== Charts ==
Chart (2005)	Peak position
Australian Music DVDs Chart	10
Austrian Music DVDs Chart	6
Belgian (Flanders) Music DVDs Chart	1
Belgian (Wallonia) Music DVDs Chart	10
Danish Music DVDs Chart	2
Dutch Music DVDs Chart	2
Finnish Music DVDs Chart	1
German Albums Chart	43
Italian Music DVDs Chart	1
New Zealand Music DVDs Chart	7
Norwegian Music DVDs Chart	2
Spanish Music DVDs Chart	1
Swedish Music DVDs Chart	1
US Music Videos Chart	2

== Certifications ==
Region	Certification	Certified units/sales
Australia (ARIA) DVD	Platinum	15,000^{^}
United States (RIAA) DVD	Gold	50,000^{^}
^{^} Shipments figures based on certification alone.
