= London Calling: Live in Hyde Park =

2010 concert film by Bruce Springsteen

- Directed by: Chris Hilson
- Produced by: Thom Zimny
- Starring: Bruce Springsteen & the E Street Band
- Edited by: Thom Zimny
- Music by: Bruce Springsteen
- Release date: June 22, 2010
- Running time: 172 minutes
- Country: United States
- Language: English

London Calling: Live in Hyde Park is a concert video of Bruce Springsteen & the E Street Band's performance during the Hard Rock Calling music festival in Hyde Park, London on June 28, 2009. The film was released on DVD and Blu-ray formats by Columbia Records on June 22, 2010.

The work takes its name from the rendition of the Clash's "London Calling" that began the concert. Performances of three songs from other shows on the tour are included as extras including one new song, "Wrecking Ball" which Springsteen wrote partially in response to the closing of Giants Stadium.

== Contents ==
All songs written by Bruce Springsteen, except where noted.

1. "London Calling" (Joe Strummer, Mick Jones)
2. "Badlands"
3. "Night"
4. "She's the One"
5. "Outlaw Pete"
6. "Out in the Street"
7. "Working on a Dream"
8. "Seeds"
9. "Johnny 99"
10. "Youngstown"
11. "Good Lovin'" (Rudy Clark, Arthur Resnick)
12. "Bobby Jean"
13. "Trapped" (Jimmy Cliff)
14. "No Surrender"
15. "Waitin' on a Sunny Day"
16. "The Promised Land"
17. "Racing in the Street"
18. "Radio Nowhere"
19. "Lonesome Day"
20. "The Rising"
21. "Born to Run"
22. "Rosalita (Come Out Tonight)"
23. "Hard Times (Come Again No More)" (Stephen Foster)
24. "Jungleland"
25. "American Land"
26. "Glory Days"
27. "Dancing in the Dark"
28. "Credits (Raise Your Hand)"

== Personnel ==
As listed in the DVD liner notes:

Main performers

- Bruce Springsteen – guitar, lead vocals [also harmonica, played in performance but not listed]
- Roy Bittan – keyboards [also accordion]
- Clarence Clemons – saxophone, percussion, vocals [also harmonica and penny whistle]
- Nils Lofgren – guitar, vocals
- Garry Tallent – bass guitar
- Stevie Van Zandt – guitar, vocals [also mandolin]
- Max Weinberg – drums

Additional musicians

- Soozie Tyrell – violin, vocals [also acoustic guitar, mandolin, percussion]
- Charlie Giordano – accordion, piano, organ, vocals
- Curtis King Jr. – vocals, percussion
- Cindy Mizelle – vocals, percussion
- Brian Fallon – vocals
- Curt Ramm – trumpet on "Wrecking Ball"

Production

- Chris Hilson – directing
- Thom Zimny – directing on "Wrecking Ball", production, editing
- Bob Clearmountain – mixing
- Bob Ludwig – audio mastering
- Aaron Warren – production on "Wrecking Ball"

== Charts ==
Chart (2010)	Peak position
Australian Music DVDs Chart	1
Austrian Music DVDs Chart	1
Belgian (Flanders) Music DVDs Chart	3
Belgian (Wallonia) Music DVDs Chart	3
Danish Music DVDs Chart	1
Dutch Music DVDs Chart	2
Finnish Music DVDs Chart	1
German Music DVDs Chart	1
Hungarian DVDs Chart	9
Irish Music DVDs Chart	1
Italian Music DVDs Chart	2
New Zealand Music DVDs Chart	1
Spanish Music DVDs Chart	2
Swedish DVDs Chart	1
Swiss Music DVDs Chart	1
UK Music Videos Chart	1

== Certifications ==
Region	Certification	Certified units/sales
Australia (ARIA)	2× Platinum	30,000^{^}
France (SNEP)	Gold	7,500^{*}
Germany (BVMI)	Gold	25,000^{^}
Ireland (IRMA)	Gold	2,000^{^}
New Zealand (RMNZ)	Gold	2,500^{^}
Spain (Promusicae)	Gold	10,000^{^}
^{*} Sales figures based on certification alone.^{^} Shipments figures based on certification alone.
