= The Rising Tour =

2002–03 concert tour by Bruce Springsteen and the E Street Band

- Tour by Bruce Springsteen and the E Street Band
- Associated album: The Rising
- Start date: August 7, 2002
- End date: October 4, 2003
- Legs: 7
- No. of shows: 120
- Box office: US $221 million ($386.79 million in 2025 dollars)

Bruce Springsteen and the E Street Band concert chronology
- Reunion Tour (1999–2000); The Rising Tour (2002–03); Vote for Change (2004)

The Rising Tour was a concert tour by Bruce Springsteen and the E Street Band's to promote Springsteen's twelfth album The Rising, which was released on July 30, 2002. The worldwide tour, which ended in October 2003, reached 17 countries. A performance filmed in Barcelona aired live on MTV Europe and VH1 UK and was later released on DVD as Live in Barcelona.

== Itinerary ==
Tour preparations began in late July and early August 2002 with closed and then semi-open rehearsals, and then several public rehearsal shows, at Asbury Park, New Jersey's Convention Hall, as well as a highly advertised early morning promotional appearance there on NBC's The Today Show. He also appeared on the Late Show with David Letterman on CBS, NBC's Saturday Night Live, and Nightline on ABC. His Nightline interview was one of the most revealing of his career.

The first leg of the tour formally began on August 7, 2002, with an opening show in Springsteen's home floor of Continental Airlines Arena in New Jersey. This commenced what Springsteen's management called their "Barnstorming" , playing 46 arena shows in 46 different cities in North America (39) and Western Europe (7) through the end of the year, ending on December 17 at Conseco Fieldhouse in Indianapolis. The idea was to maximize the publicity effect of the tour for aiding sales of the already heavily promoted new album by visiting as many markets as possible. The attendant publicity would only be increased if tickets were hard to come by, which was the case in Springsteen hot spots which were accustomed to multiple-night stands. The strategy appeared to succeed, as The Rising did well commercially and became Springsteen's best-selling album of new material in 15 years.

After a break of more than two months in winter, the second leg of the tour began on February 28, 2003, with seven more one-night stands in the United States. The band then travelled to Australia and New Zealand in March for five shows. They then returned to North America for six more shows in April, mostly in Canada.

After a three-week break, the tour went back to Western Europe, this time satisfying much pent-up demand by playing 24 shows in May and June, all in stadiums, with multiple dates in cities where necessary. These dates began in Feyenoord Stadion in Rotterdam and ended in Stadio San Siro in Milan. Concerts in Europe were very successful, with the shows in Finland, Sweden, Norway and Denmark selling out in a record two hours. Then, from mid-July through early October, the band played 33 dates in stadiums (with an intentional emphasis on baseball parks as venues in addition to the usual professional football stadiums), mostly composed of multiple-night stands along the Eastern Seaboard where Springsteen was most popular, starting with what would become 10 shows in New Jersey's Giants Stadium. These were Springsteen's first full appearances in United States stadiums since the 1985 leg of his Born in the U.S.A. Tour, and included visits to iconic venues such as Fenway Park and Dodger Stadium. The Rising Tour finally concluded on October 4, 2003, at Shea Stadium in New York City.

In all, the tour played 120 shows in 82 cities over a span of 14 months.

== The show ==
Songs from The Rising played a key role in the structure of the tour's shows. Concerts typically began with "The Rising" followed by "Lonesome Day", both songs about the September 11 attacks. New touring musician Soozie Tyrell's violin played a prominent role in establishing the texture of these numbers, as it would throughout the concert. Two more September 11-themed songs, "Empty Sky" and "You're Missing", appeared soon after, to continue the mood; the latter featured an extended instrumental coda from the band, led by Danny Federici's organ. Typically seven or eight songs into the show, "Waitin' on a Sunny Day" provided the first buoyant, upbeat moments. Springsteen's first-ever use of recorded backing music took place on the mid-show "Worlds Apart", where Middle Eastern vocals were applied. The role of elongated band introductions song for this tour was taken by "Mary's Place", which also usually included interpolations of R&B classics. The main set closer was a final September 11 number, "Into the Fire", which, relevant to the new album's themes, emphasized togetherness and praise for sacrifice rather than the pure exuberance of previous tours' closers such as "Rosalita (Come Out Tonight)" and "Light of Day". A few Rising songs were almost never played during the tour, including "Nothing Man", "Paradise", and "Let's Be Friends".

For the rest of the main set, a mixture of songs from throughout Springsteen's catalog would emerge. Set lists were unusually static during the barnstorming (perhaps due to not having to play multiple shows in a venue, although plenty of the faithful were traveling to multiple cities to see the tour), but gradually loosened up. One consistent mid-show mainstay was "Badlands", which never failed to bring audiences to their feet. The next-to-last spot in the main set was often reserved for Springsteen playing a heretofore unusual solo piano spot, running through an old classic such as "For You" or "Incident on 57th Street".

First encores of shows were typically upbeat, featuring the return after a long absence of Springsteen's biggest hit single, "Dancing in the Dark" (in a more rock-oriented arrangement), humorous numbers such as "Ramrod", and concluding with his signature song, "Born to Run". Second encores were typically more thematic, centered around "My City of Ruins", the return of the full-band version of "Born in the U.S.A.", and the benedictory "Land of Hope and Dreams".

Some of the second leg shows took place during the run-up to, and March 20, 2003, start of, the Iraq War. Springsteen took note of this, reviving his 1980s hit rendition of Edwin Starr's protest song "War" and opening the March 2 show in President George W. Bush's former hometown of Austin, Texas with it. All four Australian shows opened with an acoustic "Born in the U.S.A." before the band kicked in with "War". The March 22 show at the Sydney Cricket Ground featured three power blackouts, the first of which came after the opening chords of "War", but the crowd led Springsteen through mass sing-alongs to Max Weinberg's unamplified drums nonetheless.

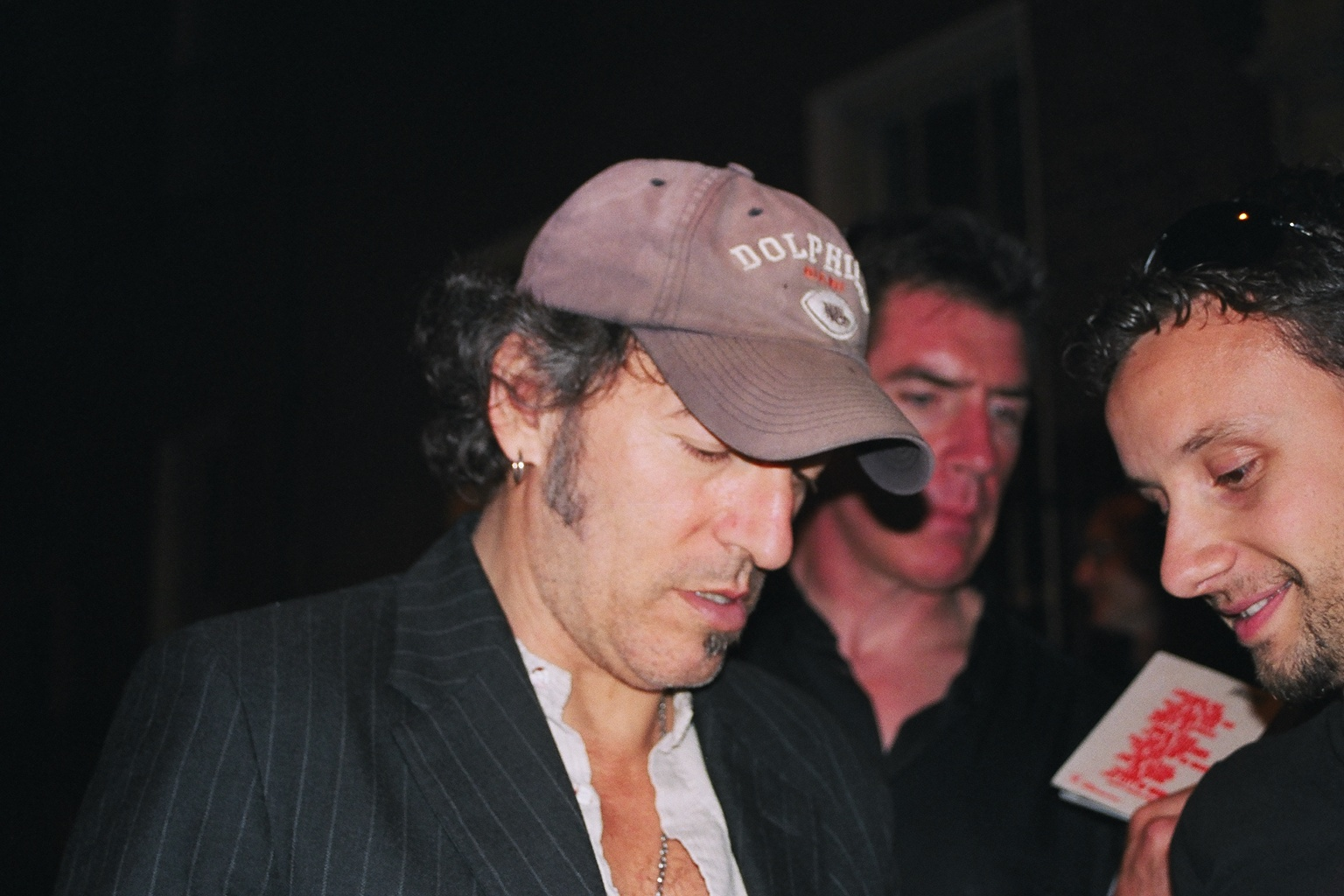
Springsteen greeting fans around the time of his May 31, 2003, show at Dublin's RDS Arena.

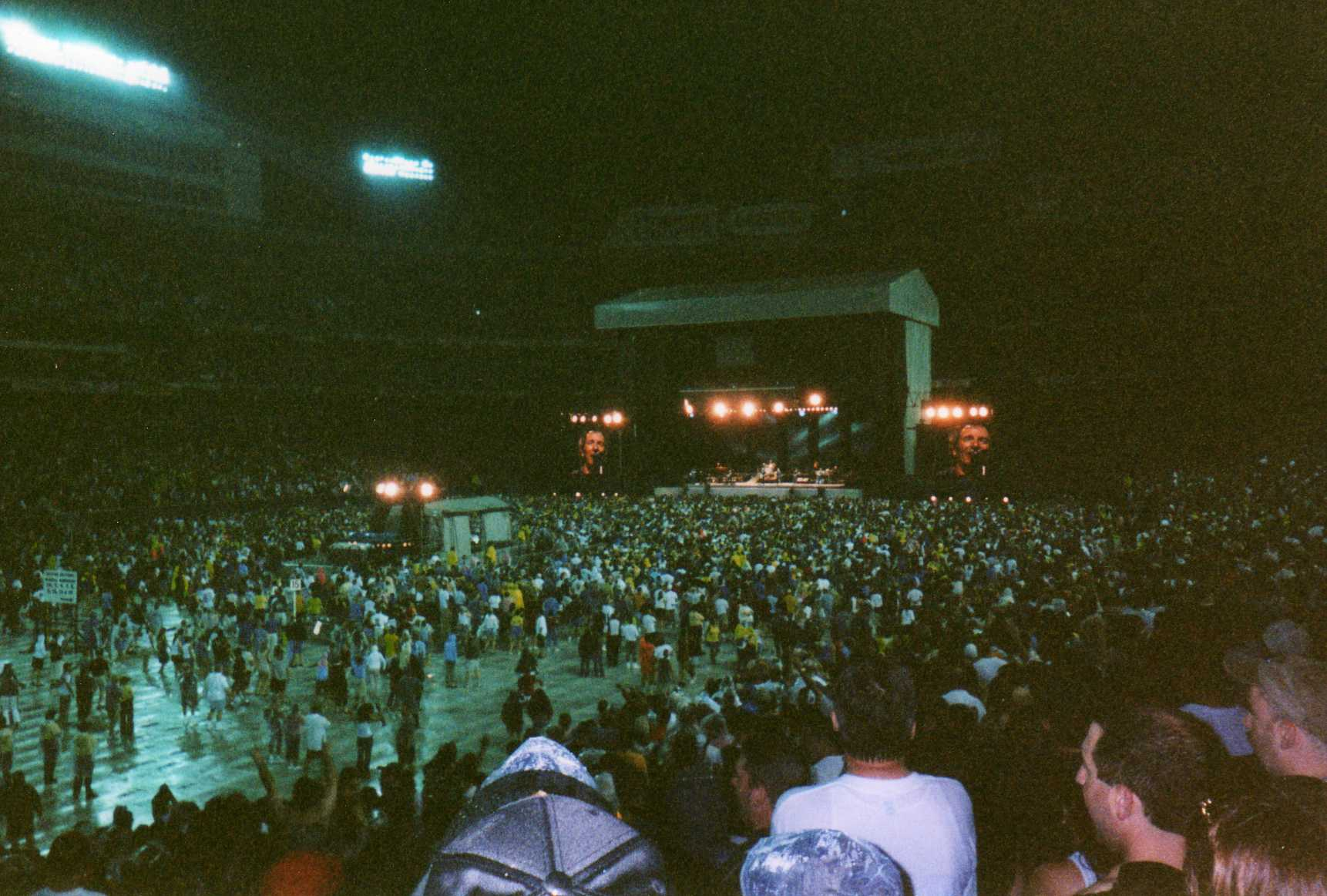
Springsteen performing the last encores at Giants Stadium on July 21, 2003

During the European stadium concerts, the solo piano spot gave way to a rotating epic slot for "Jungleland", "Racing in the Street", and the like, and a new high-energy cover, "Seven Nights to Rock", became a regular in the encores, as did extended boogie piano solos by Roy Bittan. The final European show in Milan's Stadio San Siro was said by some fans, as well as by Springsteen manager Jon Landau, to be "one of the four or five best Bruce shows of all time." By the time summer 2003 rolled around and the United States multiple night stadium dates were being played, the feel of the show became somewhat looser. As each show was about to begin, the stage video screens would show Springsteen and the band relaxedly walking in from backstage, while Frank Sinatra's recording of "Summer Wind" was aired. The second encores also brought a treat for audiences, as "Rosalita (Come Out Tonight)", a longtime fan favorite, made fully regular appearances for the first time since 1988.

During the ten Giants Stadium shows, Springsteen thanked the fans who were attending multiple shows and those coming from long distances or out of the country; the advent of robust Springsteen-oriented online communities had made these practices easier. The final Giants Stadium show concluded with a performance of the Tom Waits song "Jersey Girl".

In the two shows immediately following the September 12, 2003, death of Johnny Cash, Springsteen paid tribute by opening each show with an acoustic rendition of Cash's "I Walk the Line".

The Rising Tour came to a conclusion in the early autumn with three nights in Shea Stadium, where a controversy emerged. The New York Police Department had given Springsteen a personal boat escort for the first show (in addition to giving E Streeter Max Weinberg an escort because he was running late). But then Springsteen had made a rare performance of "American Skin (41 Shots)", a song about the NYPD shooting of Amadou Diallo, in that show. The NYPD took revenge by removing Springsteen's escort for the second show. They were criticized by Mayor Michael Bloomberg and others for doing this, and the escort was restored for the third and final night. Bob Dylan was a surprise guest on that last night, with Springsteen saying, "We have my great friend and inspiration with us tonight, Mr. Bob Dylan ... we wouldn't be here tonight without him." The two performed Dylan's "Highway 61 Revisited" together.

== Songs performed ==
Originals

Greetings from Asbury Park, New Jersey

- "Blinded by the Light"
- "Does This Bus Stop at 82nd Street?"
- "For You"
- "Growin' Up"
- "It's Hard to Be a Saint in the City"
- "Lost in the Flood"
- "Mary Queen of Arkansas"
- "Spirit in the Night"

The Wild, the Innocent & the E Street Shuffle

- "4th of July, Asbury Park (Sandy)"
- "The E Street Shuffle"
- "Incident on 57th Street"
- "Kitty's Back"
- "New York City Serenade"
- "Rosalita (Come Out Tonight)"

Born to Run

- "Backstreets"
- "Born to Run"
- "Jungleland"
- "Meeting Across the River"
- "Night"
- "She's the One"
- "Tenth Avenue Freeze-Out"
- "Thunder Road"

Darkness on the Edge of Town

- "Adam Raised a Cain"
- "Badlands"
- "Candy's Room"
- "Darkness on the Edge of Town"
- "Factory"
- "The Promised Land"
- "Prove It All Night"
- "Racing in the Street"
- "Something in the Night"
- "Streets of Fire"

The River

- "Cadillac Ranch"
- "Hungry Heart"
- "I'm a Rocker"
- "Independence Day"
- "Jackson Cage"
- "Out in the Street"
- "Point Blank"
- "Ramrod"
- "The River"
- "Sherry Darling"
- "The Ties That Bind"
- "Two Hearts"
- "You Can Look (But You Better Not Touch)"

Nebraska

- "Atlantic City"
- "Johnny 99"
- "Mansion on the Hill"

Born in the U.S.A.

- "Bobby Jean"
- "Born in the U.S.A."
- "Dancing in the Dark"
- "Darlington County"
- "Downbound Train"
- "Glory Days"
- "I'm on Fire"
- "My Hometown
- "No Surrender"
- "Working on the Highway"

Tunnel of Love

- "Brilliant Disguise"
- "Tougher Than the Rest"
- "Tunnel of Love"

Human Touch

- "Human Touch"
- "I Wish I Were Blind"
- "Man's Job
- "Roll of the Dice"

Lucky Town

- "Better Days"
- "If I Should Fall Behind"
- "Leap of Faith"
- "Living Proof"
- "Local Hero"
- "Lucky Town
- "My Beautiful Reward
- "Souls of the Departed"

Greatest Hits

- "Blood Brothers"
- "Streets of Philadelphia"
- "This Hard Land"

The Ghost of Tom Joad

- "Across the Border"
- "The Ghost of Tom Joad"
- "Youngstown"

Tracks

- "Back in Your Arms"
- "Be True"
- "Cynthia"
- "Frankie"
- "Janey Don't You Lose Heart"
- "Loose Ends"
- "My Love Will Not Let You Down"
- "Pink Cadillac"
- "Roulette"
- "So Young and in Love"
- "Stand on It"
- "Take 'Em as They Come"
- "Where the Bands Are"

The Rising

- "Countin' on a Miracle"
- "Empty Sky"
- "Further On (Up the Road)"
- "The Fuse"
- "Into the Fire"
- "Let's Be Friends (Skin to Skin)"
- "Lonesome Day"
- "Mary's Place"
- "My City of Ruins"
- "Nothing Man"
- "Paradise"
- "The Rising"
- "Waitin' on a Sunny Day"
- "World's Apart"
- "You're Missing"

Other

- "American Skin (41 Shots)"
- "Because the Night"
- "County Fair"
- "Fire"
- "From Small Things (Big Things One Day Come)"
- "Land of Hope and Dreams"
- "Light of Day"
- "The Promise"
- "Code of Silence"

 

Cover songs

- "All Just to Get to You"
- "Another Thin Line"
- "Around and Around"
- "Diddy Wah Diddy"
- "Dirty Water"
- "Follow That Dream"
- "Get Out of Denver"
- "Gloria"
- "Heat Wave"
- "Highway 61 Revisted"
- "I Fought the Law"
- "I Walk the Line"
- "Jersey Girl"
- "Kansas City"
- "Let's Go, Let's Go, Let's Go"
- "Little Queenie"
- "My Ride's Here"
- "Mystery Train"
- "96 Tears"
- "People Get Ready"
- "Pretty Flamingo"
- "Quarter to Three"
- "Raise Your Hand"
- "Roll Over Beethoven"
- "Santa Claus Is Coming to Town"
- "Seven Nights to Rock"
- "Take Me Out to the Ball Game"
- "Tell Me Why"
- "Trapped"
- "Twist and Shout"
- "War"
- "Who'll Stop the Rain?"

Soundchecked/on setlist, not played

- "Chimes of Freedom"
- "Cover Me"
- "Devils & Dust"
- "Fade Away"
- "Murder Incorporated"
- "One Step Up"
- "Restless Nights"
- "Seeds"
- "Walk Like a Man"
- "Wild Billy's Circus Story"

== Critical and commercial reception ==
Reviews of the Rising Tour were generally favorable.

A reviewer for PopMatters found an early New York City barnstorming show to be the first Springsteen show he'd seen that lived up to the classic Springsteen he imagined from the 1970s and early 1980s. As a response to the tour's role in helping fans mourn after 9/11, David Segal wrote in a review which appeared The Washington Post, "Lordy, lordy, we needed that. We needed Bruce Springsteen even more than we thought, and we thought we needed him a lot." CLUAS.com reported that a May 2003 Munich show featured tight playing, and that the general admission "pit" was a Tower of Babel of different languages from fans come from all over Europe. National Review thought that the tour had gotten much better in 2003 than it had been the year before and that the full-band performance of "Incident on 57th Street" played in Philadelphia had been especially strong.

E Street drummer Max Weinberg gave his own assessment: "Playing for a country that was so much in pain from the events of 9/11 made the Rising Tour so much more than a series of rock concerts. People looked to us — actually they looked to the music — to quiet their sorrows. At first it seemed like the responsibility hoisted on us was too much. How could rock musicians meet these expectations? But somehow we did it. Somehow the tour was a great success." [Santelli, p. 89]

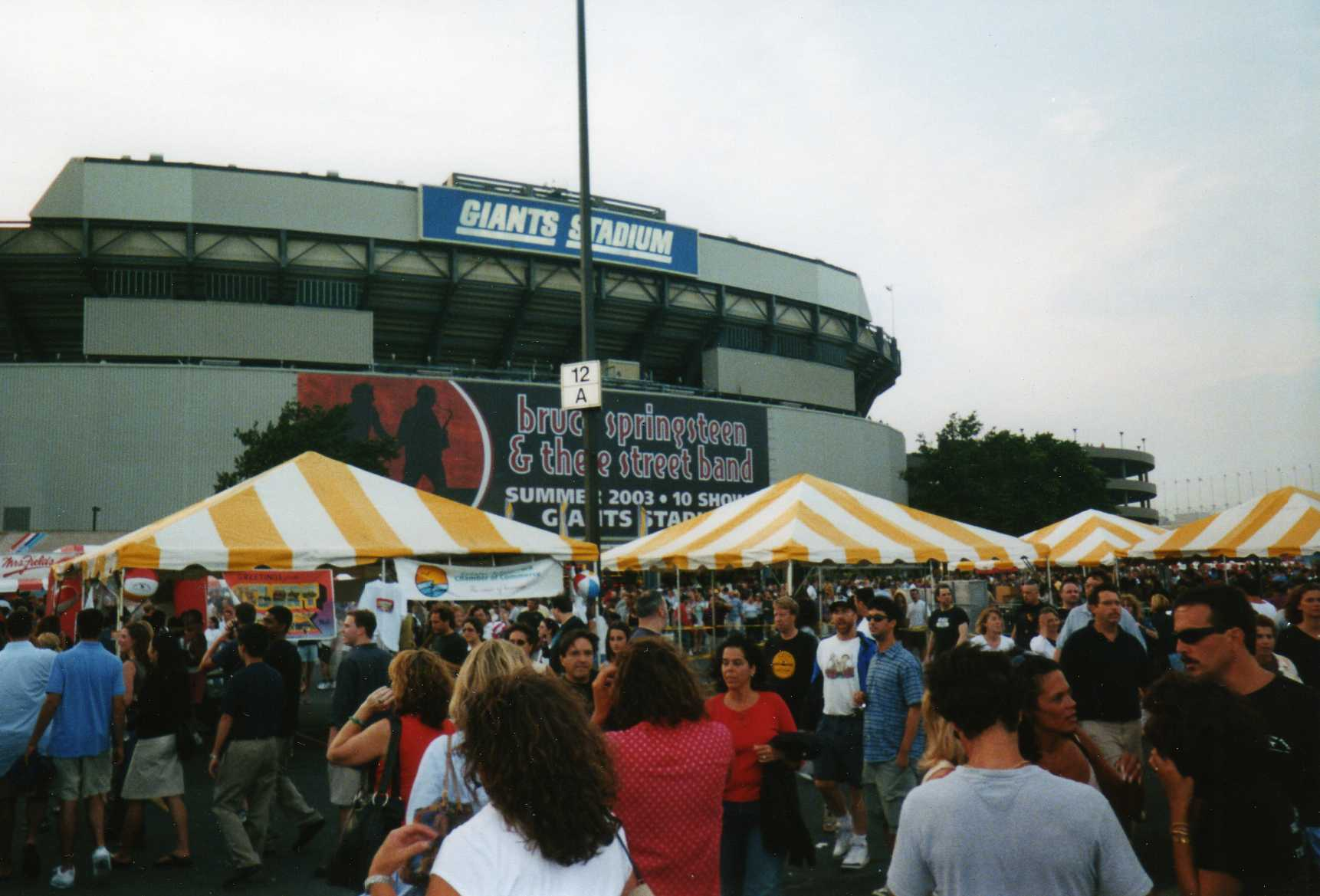
The festive park scene in the Giants Stadium parking lot for banner-celebrated, 10-night stand of The Rising Tour during July 2003.

While Springsteen's popularity had dipped over the years in some southern and midwestern regions of the United States, it was still quite strong in Europe and along the United States coasts, as exemplified by the unprecedented 10 nights he played at Giants Stadium in New Jersey.. Reuters reported that those 10 nights alone resulted in 566,560 tickets being sold and a gross of $38.8 million, a world record for one engagement. The Giants Stadium management reported that ticket buyers to those shows came from all 50 states and all over the world; they had celebrated the event by building a large boardwalk and amusement park in the parking lot next to the stadium.

Overall, according to Billboard Boxscore, the tour grossed $221.5 million over its two years. Reuters reported a $172.7 million gross worldwide for 2003 , while Pollstar reported a $115.9 million gross within North America for 2003, the best of any act that year, and the second-best ever at the time. Rolling Stone reported that Springsteen kept a bigger share of concert gross receipts than almost anyone, due to better deals with promoters and venues, to lower expenses for not having any fancy stage props or special effects, and to his New Jersey fans buying more merchandise than the average (the Giants Stadium shows had specially numbered and colored T-shirts for each night of the stand).

== Broadcasts and recordings ==
The first half of the October 16, 2002, show in Barcelona's Palau Sant Jordi was televised live across Europe on MTV Europe and VH1 UK. A tape of the broadcast was aired by CBS in the United States on February 28, 2003, one day prior to the United States summer stadium show tickets going on sale.

That entire concert was then released as a two-disc DVD, Live in Barcelona, on November 18, 2003, the first time any Springsteen concert had been officially released in full. The DVD opened with his performance of the title song, "The Rising". It also included a documentary, Drop the Needle and Pray: The Rising on Tour, with interviews and additional concert snippets from some of the United States summer stadium dates, including a clip compilation from the shows at Fenway Park entitled "Night of the Living Boss". (The last three nights of the Giants Stadium, both shows at Fenway Park, and all three Shea Stadium shows were filmed in full, but have otherwise not seen release.)

The June 16, 2003, show at the Helsinki Olympic Stadium was released through the Bruce Springsteen Archives in October 2018. Live audio of this tour was noted to be difficult to release due to being recorded using proprietary audio software that has since become out of date.

The aforementioned Barcelona concert was later remixed and released through the Bruce Springsteen Archives in October 2026. This show was noted to be easier to release due to being the first (and so far only) confirmed show on the tour that was recorded using digital tape.

== Tour dates ==
| Date | City | Country | Venue | Attendance | Revenue |
North America
| August 7, 2002 | East Rutherford | United States | Continental Airlines Arena | | |
| August 10, 2002 | Washington, D.C. | United States | MCI Center | | |
| August 12, 2002 | New York City | United States | Madison Square Garden | 18,725 / 18,725 | $1,403,175 |
| August 14, 2002 | Cleveland | United States | Gund Arena | 19,602 / 19,602 | $1,470,150 |
| August 15, 2002 | Auburn Hills | United States | The Palace of Auburn Hills | 19,177 / 19,177 | $1,438,275 |
| August 18, 2002 | Las Vegas | United States | Thomas & Mack Center | 14,196 / 14,500 | $1,064,700 |
| August 20, 2002 | Portland | United States | Rose Garden | 10,576 / 14,446 | $793,200 |
| August 21, 2002 | Tacoma | United States | Tacoma Dome | 13,736 / 17,945 | $987,750 |
| August 24, 2002 | Inglewood | United States | Great Western Forum | 17,466 / 17,466 | $1,303,650 |
| August 25, 2002 | Phoenix | United States | America West Arena | 13,830 / 13,830 | $1,002,398 |
| August 27, 2002 | San Jose | United States | Compaq Center | 17,137 / 17,137 | $1,285,275 |
| August 30, 2002 | St. Louis | United States | Savvis Center | 13,670 / 20,135 | $915,500 |
| September 22, 2002 | Denver | United States | Pepsi Center | 17,713 / 17,713 | $1,343,452 |
| September 24, 2002 | Kansas City | United States | Kemper Arena | 10,899 / 10,899 | $800,136 |
| September 25, 2002 | Chicago | United States | United Center | 20,119 / 20,119 | $1,508,625 |
| September 27, 2002 | Milwaukee | United States | Bradley Center | 19,131 / 19,131 | $1,396,563 |
| September 29, 2002 | Fargo | United States | Fargodome | | |
| September 30, 2002 | Saint Paul | United States | Xcel Energy Center | 18,927 / 18,927 | $1,391,235 |
| October 4, 2002 | Boston | United States | FleetCenter | | |
| October 6, 2002 | Philadelphia | United States | First Union Center | 19,738 / 19,738 | $1,414,594 |
| October 7, 2002 | Buffalo | United States | HSBC Arena | | |
Europe
| October 14, 2002 | Paris | France | Palais Omnisports de Paris-Bercy | | |
| October 16, 2002 | Barcelona | Spain | Palau Sant Jordi | | |
| October 18, 2002 | Bologna | Italy | Unipol Arena | | |
| October 20, 2002 | Berlin | Germany | Velodrom | | |
| October 22, 2002 | Rotterdam | Netherlands | Rotterdam Ahoy | | |
| October 24, 2002 | Stockholm | Sweden | Globe Arena | | |
| October 27, 2002 | London | England | Wembley Arena | | |
North America
| November 3, 2002 | Dallas | United States | American Airlines Center | | |
| November 4, 2002 | Houston | United States | Compaq Center | | |
| November 12, 2002 | Cincinnati | United States | U.S. Bank Arena | | |
| November 14, 2002 | Lexington | United States | Rupp Arena | 9,507 / 11,500 | $713,025 |
| November 16, 2002 | Greensboro | United States | Greensboro Coliseum | 20,397 / 20,397 | $1,487,411 |
| November 19, 2002 | Birmingham | United States | BJCC Arena | 9,648 / 9,648 | $670,000 |
| November 21, 2002 | Orlando | United States | TD Waterhouse Centre | 13,375 / 13,375 | $946,981 |
| November 23, 2002 | Miami | United States | American Airlines Arena | | |
| November 24, 2002 | Tampa | United States | St. Pete Times Forum | 19,644 / 19,644 | |
| December 2, 2002 | Atlanta | United States | Philips Arena | 17,408 / 17,408 | $1,211,256 |
| December 4, 2002 | Pittsburgh | United States | Mellon Arena | | |
| December 5, 2002 | Toronto | Canada | Air Canada Centre | 19,060 / 19,060 | $1,391,160 |
| December 8, 2002 | Charlotte | United States | Charlotte Coliseum | 18,968 / 20,030 | $1,396,425 |
| December 9, 2002 | Columbia | United States | Carolina Center | 12,513 / 13,512 | $903,225 |
| December 13, 2002 | Albany | United States | Pepsi Arena | 16,015 / 16,015 | $1,170,310 |
| December 16, 2002 | Columbus | United States | Schottenstein Center | | |
| December 17, 2002 | Indianapolis | United States | Conseco Fieldhouse | | |
| February 28, 2003 | Duluth | United States | Arena at Gwinnett Center | | |
| March 2, 2003 | Austin | United States | Frank Erwin Center | 10,110 / 15,900 | $758,250 |
| March 4, 2003 | Jacksonville | United States | Jacksonville Coliseum | 9,469 / 9,515 | $690,077 |
| March 6, 2003 | Richmond | United States | Richmond Coliseum | 13,424 / 13,424 | $1,001,925 |
| March 7, 2003 | Atlantic City | United States | Boardwalk Hall | 12,500 / 12,500 | |
| March 10, 2003 | Providence | United States | Dunkin' Donuts Center | 13,222 / 13,222 | $982,500 |
| March 11, 2003 | Rochester | United States | Blue Cross Arena | 12,426 / 12,426 | $906,329 |
Australia
| March 20, 2003 | Melbourne | Australia | Telstra Dome | | |
| March 22, 2003 | Sydney | Australia | Sydney Cricket Ground | | |
| March 25, 2003 | Brisbane | Australia | Brisbane Entertainment Centre | | |
| March 26, 2003 | Brisbane | Australia | Brisbane Entertainment Centre | | |
| March 28, 2003 | Auckland | New Zealand | Western Springs Stadium | | |
North America
| April 9, 2003 | Sacramento | United States | ARCO Arena | 14,285 / 14,763 | $1,038,176 |
| April 11, 2003 | Vancouver | Canada | Pacific Coliseum | 14,531 / 14,531 | $1,137,832 |
| April 13, 2003 | Calgary | Canada | Pengrowth Saddledome | 13,891 / 13,891 | $1,089,749 |
| April 14, 2003 | Edmonton | Canada | Skyreach Centre | 9,625 / 10,000 | $741,444 |
| April 18, 2003 | Ottawa | Canada | Corel Centre | | |
| April 19, 2003 | Montreal | Canada | Bell Centre | 16,581 / 16,581 | $1,316,961 |
Europe
| May 6, 2003 | Rotterdam | Netherlands | Feyenoord Stadion | | |
| May 8, 2003 | Rotterdam | Netherlands | Feyenoord Stadion | | |
| May 10, 2003 | Ludwigshafen | Germany | Sudweststadion | | |
| May 12, 2003 | Brussels | Belgium | King Baudouin Stadium | | |
| May 15, 2003 | Gijón | Spain | El Molinon | | |
| May 17, 2003 | Barcelona | Spain | Estadi Olimpic de Montjuic | | |
| May 19, 2003 | Madrid | Spain | Estadio La Peineta | | |
| May 22, 2003 | Gelsenkirchen | Germany | Arena AufSchalke | | |
| May 24, 2003 | Saint-Denis | France | Stade de France | | |
| May 26, 2003 | London | England | Crystal Palace National Sports Centre | | |
| May 27, 2003 | London | England | Crystal Palace National Sports Centre | | |
| May 29, 2003 | Manchester | England | Old Trafford Cricket Ground | | |
| May 31, 2003 | Dublin | Ireland | RDS Arena | | |
| June 8, 2003 | Florence | Italy | Stadio Artemio Franchi | | |
| June 10, 2003 | Munich | Germany | Olympiastadion | | |
| June 12, 2003 | Hamburg | Germany | Volksparkstadion | | |
| June 14, 2003 | Copenhagen | Denmark | Parken Stadium | | |
| June 16, 2003 | Helsinki | Finland | Helsinki Olympic Stadium | | |
| June 17, 2003 | Helsinki | Finland | Helsinki Olympic Stadium | | |
| June 19, 2003 | Oslo | Norway | Valle Hovin | | |
| June 21, 2003 | Gothenburg | Sweden | Ullevi | | |
| June 22, 2003 | Gothenburg | Sweden | Ullevi | | |
| June 25, 2003 | Vienna | Austria | Ernst-Happel-Stadion | | |
| June 28, 2003 | Milan | Italy | Stadio San Siro | | |
North America
| July 15, 2003 | East Rutherford | United States | Giants Stadium | 566,560 / 566,560 | $38,684,050 |
| July 17, 2003 | East Rutherford | United States | Giants Stadium | 566,560 / 566,560 | $38,684,050 |
| July 18, 2003 | East Rutherford | United States | Giants Stadium | 566,560 / 566,560 | $38,684,050 |
| July 21, 2003 | East Rutherford | United States | Giants Stadium | 566,560 / 566,560 | $38,684,050 |
| July 24, 2003 | East Rutherford | United States | Giants Stadium | 566,560 / 566,560 | $38,684,050 |
| July 26, 2003 | East Rutherford | United States | Giants Stadium | 566,560 / 566,560 | $38,684,050 |
| July 27, 2003 | East Rutherford | United States | Giants Stadium | 566,560 / 566,560 | $38,684,050 |
| August 1, 2003 | Foxborough | United States | Gillette Stadium | 96,108 / 98,559 | $7,107,215 |
| August 2, 2003 | Foxborough | United States | Gillette Stadium | 96,108 / 98,559 | $7,107,215 |
| August 6, 2003 | Pittsburgh | United States | PNC Park | 42,301 / 48,074 | $3,137,575 |
| August 8, 2003 | Philadelphia | United States | Lincoln Financial Field | 139,318 / 147,763 | $10,342,060 |
| August 9, 2003 | Philadelphia | United States | Lincoln Financial Field | 139,318 / 147,763 | $10,342,060 |
| August 11, 2003 | Philadelphia | United States | Lincoln Financial Field | 139,318 / 147,763 | $10,342,060 |
| August 13, 2003 | Chicago | United States | U.S. Cellular Field | 39,439 / 39,439 | $2,970,543 |
| August 16, 2003 | San Francisco | United States | Pacific Bell Park | 40,702 / 40,702 | $3,134,054 |
| August 17, 2003 | Los Angeles | United States | Dodger Stadium | 42,678 / 53,358 | $2,826,215 |
| August 28, 2003 | East Rutherford | United States | Giants Stadium | (Note: The score data is representative of the all shows at the Giants Stadium on July 15, 17-18, 21, 24, 26-27, and August 28, 30-31 respectively.) | |
| August 30, 2003 | East Rutherford | United States | Giants Stadium | (Note: The score data is representative of the all shows at the Giants Stadium on July 15, 17-18, 21, 24, 26-27, and August 28, 30-31 respectively.) | |
| August 31, 2003 | East Rutherford | United States | Giants Stadium | (Note: The score data is representative of the all shows at the Giants Stadium on July 15, 17-18, 21, 24, 26-27, and August 28, 30-31 respectively.) | |
| September 6, 2003 | Boston | United States | Fenway Park | 70,827 / 70,827 | $5,222,625 |
| September 7, 2003 | Boston | United States | Fenway Park | 70,827 / 70,827 | $5,222,625 |
| September 10, 2003 | Toronto | Canada | SkyDome | | |
| September 13, 2003 | Washington, D.C. | United States | FedExField | 46,056 / 59,056 | $3,326,995 |
| September 14, 2003 | Chapel Hill | United States | Kenan Stadium | 26,501 / 39,607 | $1,632,685 |
| September 16, 2003 | East Hartford | United States | Rentschler Field | 51,569 / 66,000 | $3,788,325 |
| September 18, 2003 | East Hartford | United States | Rentschler Field | 51,569 / 66,000 | $3,788,325 |
| September 20, 2003 | Corfu | United States | Darien Lake Performing Arts Center | 11,951 / 19,999 | $796,790 |
| September 21, 2003 | Detroit | United States | Comerica Park | 27,728 / 37,437 | $2,048,816 |
| September 25, 2003 | Denver | United States | Invesco Field at Mile High | 35,679 / 37,500 | $2,442,072 |
| September 27, 2003 | Milwaukee | United States | Miller Park | 32,812 / 40,566 | $2,451,588 |
| October 1, 2003 | New York City | United States | Shea Stadium | 147,892 / 161,000 | $10,858,610 |
| October 3, 2003 | New York City | United States | Shea Stadium | 147,892 / 161,000 | $10,858,610 |
| October 4, 2003 | New York City | United States | Shea Stadium | 147,892 / 161,000 | $10,858,610 |

== Personnel ==
=== The E Street Band ===
- Bruce Springsteen – lead vocals, most lead guitars, harmonica, occasional piano
- Roy Bittan – piano, synthesizer
- Clarence Clemons – saxophone, background vocals
- Danny Federici – organ, electronic glockenspiel, accordion
- Nils Lofgren – guitars, pedal steel guitar, dobro, banjo, background vocals
- Patti Scialfa – acoustic guitar, background vocals, some featured duet vocals, electric guitar on "Ramrod"
- Garry Tallent – bass guitar
- Steven Van Zandt – guitars, mandolin, background vocals
- Max Weinberg – drums

with:

- Soozie Tyrell – violin, percussion, background vocals

Scialfa missed some shows in Europe due to family duties.

The only change from the 1999–2000 Reunion Tour line-up was the addition of Tyrell.

== Sources ==
- Santelli, Robert. Greetings From E Street: The Story of Bruce Springsteen and the E Street Band. Chronicle Books, 2006. ISBN 0-8118-5348-9.
- Springsteen's official website does not have much on the 2002–2003 period anymore.
- Shore Fire Media press release archives are useful for understanding scheme behind the tour.
- Live in Barcelona DVD cover notes.
- Backstreets.com's 2002 set lists and show descriptions and Backstreets.com's 2003 set lists and show descriptions
- Killing Floor's concert database

== See also ==
- List of highest-grossing concert series at a single venue
- List of most-attended concert series at a single venue
