= The Rising (album) =

Studio album by Bruce Springsteen
- Released: July 30, 2002
- Recorded: January–March 2002; Southern Tracks Recording Studio, Atlanta, Georgia, U.S.
- Genres: Rock; heartland rock
- Length: 72:52
- Label: Columbia
- Producer: Brendan O'Brien

Bruce Springsteen and the E Street Band chronology
Live in New York City (2001)	The Rising (2002)	The Essential Bruce Springsteen (2003)

Bruce Springsteen chronology
Live in New York City (2001)	The Rising (2002)	The Essential Bruce Springsteen (2003)

Singles from The Rising
- 1. "The Rising" Released: June 24, 2002; 2. "Lonesome Day" Released: December 2, 2002; 3. "Waitin' on a Sunny Day" Released: April 22, 2003

The Rising is the twelfth studio album by the American singer-songwriter Bruce Springsteen, released on July 30, 2002, on Columbia Records. The album is based in large part on Springsteen's reflections in the aftermath of the September 11 attacks the year before. The album was a critical and commercial success, representing Springsteen's first album to top the US Billboard 200 since Tunnel of Love in 1987.

Hailed as a triumphant return to form for Springsteen, the album won two Grammy Awards and marked the start of a successful collaboration with producer Brendan O'Brien. The Rising came seven years after The Ghost of Tom Joad (1995), the longest interlude between studio albums for the artist, and was his first in almost two decades with the E Street Band, with whom he had recently completed a highly successful reunion tour.

== Background and recording ==
Springsteen felt compelled to record The Rising when, in the aftermath of the attacks on September 11, 2001, a stranger in an adjacent vehicle rolled down his window and said: "We need you now". A few of the songs were written before the attacks. The title track tells the story of a firefighter going up the World Trade Center as survivors flee, and evokes the image of peoples' spirits rising up like angels with a "dream of life".

"My City of Ruins" was originally performed in, and written about, Asbury Park. The song took on a new meaning soon after the September 11 attacks, when "its lyrics of hope and rebirth [became] a rallying cry". Springsteen performed the song live at the America: A Tribute to Heroes national telethon ten days after the attacks. With only a guitar and a harmonica, Springsteen introduced the number as "'a prayer for our fallen brothers and sisters'". "My City of Ruins" is organized around the melody line of Curtis Mayfield's "People Get Ready".

"Further On (Up the Road)" was performed live in Madison Square Garden at the end of the Springsteen–E Street Reunion Tour, and was professionally recorded, although it was not included in the HBO, DVD, or CD versions of Bruce Springsteen & the E Street Band: Live in New York City.

"Waitin' on a Sunny Day" was originally written in the 1990s and played during a soundcheck on the Reunion Tour. Springsteen has commented that "Nothing Man" was originally completed in 1994, but re-recorded for this album.

"Worlds Apart", the most experimental song on the album, features a heavy Middle Eastern influence along with Qawwali singers in the introduction.

"The Fuse", another experimental track, features a subtle hip hop beat and vocal looping. A re-recorded version of the song, with an orchestral backing, features in the Spike Lee-directed film 25th Hour.

"Mary's Place" is directly inspired by Sam Cooke's "Meet Me at Mary's Place".

== Release ==
Following the biggest pre-release promotion of Springsteen's career and a tour, The Rising became Springsteen's sixth No. 1 album on the US Billboard 200, and topped the charts in six other countries, including the UK.

== Critical reception ==
Professional ratings
Aggregate scores
Source	Rating
Metacritic	82/100
Review scores
Source	Rating
AllMusic	4/5 stars
Blender	4/5 stars
Entertainment Weekly	A−
The Guardian	3/5 stars
NME	7/10
Pitchfork	8.2/10
Q	4/5 stars
Rolling Stone	5/5 stars
Spin	8/10
Uncut	5/5 stars

The Rising received widespread acclaim from critics. Metacritic gave it an aggregate score of 82 / 100, based on 21 reviews. In Rolling Stone, Kurt Loder lauded it as a triumphant and cohesive album that possesses a "bold thematic concentration and penetrating emotional focus". Thom Jurek of AllMusic called it "one of the very best examples ... of how popular art can evoke a time period and all of its confusing and often contradictory notions, feelings and impulses." David Browne, writing in Entertainment Weekly, felt that Springsteen's message had a renewed relevance, while his occasionally overburdened lyrics were saved by lively and vivid music. Keith Phipps of The A.V. Club wrote that the musically confident album showcased Springsteen's strength as an empathic songwriter. Uncut magazine called The Rising "a brave and beautiful album of humanity, hurt and hope from the songwriter best qualified to speak to and for his country ... A towering achievement."

In a mixed review for The Guardian, Alexis Petridis found the music to be awkwardly old-fashioned, with the best songs featuring strong melodies, as he judged the lyrics to be simplistic and unambiguous. Keith Harris of The Village Voice criticised it as being vague and unworldly, and lacking in real-life characters "responding in their idiosyncratic ways". Robert Christgau cited "Paradise", "Nothing Man", "The Rising", and "My City of Ruins" as "choice cuts", but concluded that the album "isn't worth your time or money". He felt that a marked patriotism "dragged down" the album with "overburdened emotions and conceptual commonplaces".

The Rising was voted the sixth-best album of 2002 in the Pazz & Jop. Christgau, the poll's creator and supervisor, ranked the title track as the year's tenth best single. Kludge included it on their best albums of 2002. In 2011, Rolling Stone named it the fifteenth best album of the 2000s. The album was also included in the book 1001 Albums You Must Hear Before You Die. It won the Grammy Award for Best Rock Album in 2003; although nominated for the Album of the Year award as well, it was beaten by Norah Jones's debut album Come Away with Me. The title song "The Rising" was also a Grammy recipient.

== Legacy ==
Although The Rising was a response to 9/11, many see it as a more universal anthem of resilience and hope. On the tenth anniversary of 9/11, Dan DeLuca of the Philadelphia Inquirer said: "The songs make contextual sense in the aftermath of 9/11, but the specific details that give them power are allusive. 'Lonesome Day,' 'You're Missing,' and 'My City of Ruins' are about the hollowing devastation of that day, but the language is universal, so the sentiments are by no means frozen in time." The song "My City of Ruins" has been used in response to tragedies other than 9/11, such as the devastation of Hurricane Katrina and the 2011 Christchurch earthquake. In 2006, while on tour supporting his We Shall Overcome: The Seeger Sessions album, Springsteen performed the song at the New Orleans Jazz & Heritage Festival. The song received an emotional response from the crowd given its refrain of "Come on rise up!" "The Rising", given its message of hope in the face of adversity, was featured prominently at the 2020 Democratic National Convention.

== Track listing ==
This album was released as a vinyl double LP. Tracks 1–4 = Side 1; 5–8 = Side 2; 9–11 = Side 3; 12–15 = Side 4.

All tracks are written by Bruce Springsteen.

No.	Title	Length
1.	"Lonesome Day"	4:08
2.	"Into the Fire"	5:04
3.	"Waitin' on a Sunny Day"	4:18
4.	"Nothing Man"	4:23
5.	"Countin' on a Miracle"	4:44
6.	"Empty Sky"	3:34
7.	"Worlds Apart"	6:07
8.	"Let's Be Friends (Skin to Skin)"	4:21
9.	"Further On (Up the Road)"	3:52
10.	"The Fuse"	5:37
11.	"Mary's Place"	6:03
12.	"You're Missing"	5:10
13.	"The Rising"	4:50
14.	"Paradise"	5:39
15.	"My City of Ruins"	5:00

=== Tour edition bonus DVD ===
1. "The Rising" [live, 2002 MTV Video Music Awards performance]
2. "Waitin' on a Sunny Day" [live, The Rising Tour, Barcelona, Spain, 2002]
3. "Lonesome Day" [music video]
4. "Mary's Place" [The Rising Tour, Barcelona, Spain, 2002]
5. "Dancing in the Dark" [The Rising Tour, Barcelona, Spain, 2002]

== Personnel ==
Adapted from the liner notes:

- Bruce Springsteen – lead guitar, vocals, acoustic guitar, baritone guitar, harmonica
- Roy Bittan – keyboards, piano, Mellotron, Kurzweil, pump organ, Korg M1, Crumar
- Clarence Clemons – saxophone, background vocals
- Danny Federici – Hammond B3, Vox Continental, Farfisa
- Nils Lofgren – electric guitar, Dobro, slide guitar, banjo, background vocals
- Patti Scialfa – vocals
- Garry Tallent – bass guitar
- Steven Van Zandt – electric guitar, background vocals, mandolin
- Max Weinberg – drums

Additional musicians

- Soozie Tyrell – violin (tracks 1–3, 7, 8, 10–13, 15), background vocals (tracks 1–3, 8, 10–13, 15)
- Brendan O'Brien – hurdy-gurdy (tracks 2, 6), glockenspiel (tracks 2, 3), orchestra bells (track 3)
- Larry Lemaster – cello (tracks 1, 12)
- Jere Flint – cello (tracks 1, 12)
- Jane Scarpantoni – cello (tracks 2, 11, 13, 15)
- Nashville String Machine (tracks 5, 12):
  - Carl Gorodetzky – contractor, concert master, violin
  - Pam Sixfin, Lee Larrison, Conni Ellisor, Alan Umstead, Dave Davidson, Mary Kathryn Vanosdale, David Angell – violins
  - Kris Wilkinson, Gary Vanosdale, Jim Grosjean, Monisa Angell – viola
  - Bob Mason, Carol Rabinowitz, Julie Tanner, Lynn Peithman – celli
  - Ricky Keller – strings arrangement, conductor
- Asif Ali Khan and group – vocal guests (track 7):
  - Asif Ali Khan – lead singer
  - Karamat Ali Asad – harmonium
  - Haji Nazir Afridi – tabla
  - Manzoor Hussain Shibli, Sarfraz Hussain, Raza Hussain, Imtiaz Shibli, Shahnawaz Hussain Khan, Bakhat Fayyaz Hussain, Omerdaz Hussain Aftab, Waheed Hussain Mumtaz
- Alliance Singers (tracks 8, 11):
  - Carinda Carford – contractor, choir
  - Michelle Moore – choir solo
  - Tiffeny Andrews, Antionette Moore, Antonio Lawrence, Jesse Moorer – choir
- The Miami Horns (track 11):
  - Mark Pender – trumpet
  - Mike Spengler – trumpet
  - Rich Rosenberg – trombone
  - Jerry Vivino – tenor sax
  - Ed Manion – baritone sax

Technical

- Brendan O'Brien – production, mixing
- Nick Didia – engineering
- Karl Egsieker – second engineering
- Billy Bowers – additional engineering
- Toby Scott – additional engineering (track 8)
- Melissa Mattey – second engineering for Nashville String Machine (track 5)
- Chuck Plotkin – recording engineering for Asif Ali Khan and Group (track 7)
- Dave Reed – engineering for Asif Ali Khan and Group (track 7)
- Bryan Humphrey – second engineering for Asif Ali Khan and Group (track 7)
- Bob Ludwig – mastering
- Laurie Flannery – digital editing
- Chris Austopchuk – art direction
- Dave Bett – art direction, design
- Michelle Holme – design
- Danny Clinch – photography

== Charts ==
=== Weekly charts ===
Weekly chart performance for The Rising
Chart (2002)	Peak position
Australian Albums (ARIA)	4
Austrian Albums (Ö3 Austria)	2
Belgian Albums (Ultratop Flanders)	2
Belgian Albums (Ultratop Wallonia)	3
Canadian Albums (Billboard)	1
Danish Albums (Hitlisten)	1
Dutch Albums (Album Top 100)	1
European Albums (Music & Media)	1
Finnish Albums (Suomen virallinen lista)	1
French Albums (SNEP)	3
German Albums (Offizielle Top 100)	1
Irish Albums (IRMA)	2
Italian Albums (FIMI)	1
New Zealand Albums (RMNZ)	12
Norwegian Albums (VG-lista)	1
Polish Albums (ZPAV)	15
Scottish Albums (Official Charts)	1
Spanish Albums (PROMUSICAE)	1
Swedish Albums (Sverigetopplistan)	1
Swiss Albums (Schweizer Hitparade)	2
UK Albums (Official Charts)	1
US Billboard 200	1

=== Year-end charts ===
2002 year-end chart performance for The Rising
Chart (2002)	Position
Austrian Albums (Ö3 Austria)	43
Belgian Albums (Ultratop Flanders)	16
Belgian Albums (Ultratop Wallonia)	88
Canadian Albums (Nielsen SoundScan)	53
Dutch Albums (Album Top 100)	40
French Albums (SNEP)	111
German Albums (Offizielle Top 100)	14
Swedish Albums (Sverigetopplistan)	3
Swiss Albums (Schweizer Hitparade)	34
UK Albums (OCC)	87
US Billboard 200	34
Worldwide Albums (IFPI)	20

2003 year-end chart performance for The Rising
Chart (2003)	Position
Belgian Albums (Ultratop Flanders)	99
US Billboard 200	166

== Certifications and sales ==
Certifications and certifications for The Rising
Region	Certification	Certified units/sales
Australia (ARIA)	Platinum	70,000^{^}
Austria (IFPI Austria)	Gold	15,000^{*}
Belgium (BRMA)	Gold	25,000^{*}
Denmark (IFPI Danmark)	Platinum	50,000^{^}
Finland (Musiikkituottajat)	Gold	28,121
France (SNEP)	Gold	100,000^{*}
Germany (BVMI)	Platinum	300,000^{^}
Netherlands (NVPI)	Gold	40,000^{^}
New Zealand (RMNZ)	Platinum	15,000^{^}
Norway (IFPI Norway)	Platinum	40,000^{*}
Spain (Promusicae)	Platinum	100,000^{^}
Sweden (GLF)	2× Platinum	120,000^{^}
Switzerland (IFPI Switzerland)	Gold	20,000^{^}
United Kingdom (BPI)	Platinum	300,000^{*}
United States (RIAA)	2× Platinum	2,100,000
Summaries
Europe (IFPI)	Platinum	1,000,000^{*}
^{*} Sales figures based on certification alone.^{^} Shipments figures based on certification alone.

== See also ==
- The Rising, 9/11 attack memorial
