= The Rising (Bruce Springsteen song) =

2002 single

Single by Bruce Springsteen

from the album The Rising
- B-side: "Land of Hope and Dreams" (live)
- Released: July 16, 2002
- Recorded: February–March 2002; Southern Tracks Recording Studio, Atlanta, Georgia
- Genre: Rock
- Length: 4:50
- Label: Columbia
- Songwriter: Bruce Springsteen
- Producer: Brendan O'Brien

Bruce Springsteen singles chronology
"Sad Eyes" (1999)	"The Rising" (2002)	"Lonesome Day" (2002)

"The Rising" is the title track on Bruce Springsteen's 12th studio album The Rising, and was released as a single in 2002. Springsteen wrote the song in reaction to the September 11, 2001 attacks on New York City. It gained critical praise and earned Grammy Awards for Best Rock Song and Best Male Rock Vocal Performance, as well as a nomination for Song of the Year. Rolling Stone named it the 35th best song of the decade, and VH1 placed it 81st on its list of the "100 Greatest Songs of the '00s". It was used as the first credit song to end the broadcast of the 2002 World Series on Fox Sports.

== History and themes ==
The song was written late in The Rising's development, and was meant as a bookend to the album's "Into the Fire". Springsteen could not let go of one of the central images of that day, those who were "ascending into ... what?" Thus, the song tells the story of a New York City Fire Department firefighter, climbing one of the World Trade Center towers after the hijacked planes had hit them during the September 11 attacks. The lyric depicts the surreal, desperate environment in which he finds himself:

Can't see nothin' in front of me,
Can't see nothin' coming up behind
I make my way through this darkness,
I can't feel nothing but this chain that binds me.
Lost track of how far I've gone
How far I've gone, how high I've climbed
On my back's a 60-pound stone
On my shoulder a half mile of line

The choruses are more upbeat, featuring a more pronounced drum part and "Li, li, li" vocal parts that suggest Hallelujahs, but as the song progresses the verses trace the ever more dire situation. Images of fire engines and the Cross of Saint Florian are introduced, and then, in the cemetery-like "garden of a thousand sighs" from Shakespeare's Twelfth Night, a series of final visions: his wife, his children, and all human experience:

Sky of blackness and sorrow (dream of life)
Sky of love, sky of tears (dream of life)
Sky of glory and sadness (dream of life)
Sky of mercy, sky of fear (dream of life)
Sky of memory and shadow (dream of life)

The song's religious imagery also includes references to Mary Magdalene meeting the risen Christ on Easter morning ("I see Mary in the garden"), and the Blood of Christ, although Springsteen has stated that the Mary in the song could also be the hero's wife or lover. Writer Jeffrey Symynkywicz evaluates the song as "an Easterlike anthem arising out of the darkness and despair of September 11, a national Good Friday experience if ever there was one."

== Release ==
The single was released ahead of the album, initially appearing on AOL First Listen on June 24, 2002 and then being officially released on July 16. There was a considerable marketing push for the single and the subsequent album, based on the September 11 connection and on being the first studio recordings from Springsteen with the E Street Band in 15 years. "The Rising" also debuted Springsteen's collaboration with producer Brendan O'Brien, who gave Springsteen a somewhat more modern-sounding feel than did former producer Jon Landau. Although "The Rising" was not a pop hit, peaking at only #52 on the Billboard Hot 100, it achieved significant radio airplay early on and kept it in some quarters, making #24 on the Mainstream Rock Tracks chart, #16 on the Adult Contemporary chart and #1 on the Triple-A chart in the U.S.

"The Rising" was included on both of Springsteen's subsequent compilation albums, 2003's The Essential Bruce Springsteen and 2009's Wal-Mart-only Greatest Hits. A concert performance was also included on the 2003 Live in Barcelona video release.

== Music video ==
A music video of "The Rising", attributed to Bruce Springsteen, and with copyright credit to Sony Music, has been shown twice on the Australian Broadcasting Corporation's music video program rage. The first airing was on December 20, 2003 and the second was on February 28, 2017. However, the authenticity of this music video is disputed, as no other sources have been yet found to establish whether this music video was an official Sony release but not widely aired, an official music video that remains unreleased but for reasons unknown was broadcast unauthorized, or a music video created by an unauthorized party without Springsteen's or Sony's sanction, but which managed to defeat normal licensing and authenticity checks and was broadcast on one of Australia's national television networks.

The video that was broadcast is made in hand-held home-movie style, with highly exaggerated film grain added throughout the clip. It shows Springsteen driving in the rain through the countryside, rehearsal shots inside the Southern Tracks recording studio in Atlanta, Georgia, images of Springsteen strumming a guitar in an empty house, and a variety of other imagery related to the lyrics in the song. There is no lip synching in the video. The audio recording on this video is an edit of the album version of the song, and is shorter by 20 seconds.

== Awards and critical reaction ==
At the 45th Annual Grammy Awards, "The Rising" won the Grammy for Best Rock Song and for Best Male Rock Vocal Performance. It was also nominated for the Grammy Award for Song of the Year.

Critical reaction to "The Rising" was extremely positive. Allmusic called it "one of Mr. Springsteen's greatest songs. It is an anthem, but not in the sense you usually reference in regard to his work. This anthem is an invitation to share everything, to accept everything, to move through everything individually and together." Rolling Stone worried that, "As with 'Born in the U.S.A.', the title ... may mislead some who hear it, particularly those intent on retaliation, which Springsteen himself shows little interest in contemplating. His concern is not with a national uprising but with a rising above: the transcending of ever-mounting losses and ancient hatreds." The New York Times described "The Rising" as a work in which "one man's afterlife is an endless longing for the physical touch of those left behind, and the music climbs toward jubilation as an act of will."

Rolling Stone named "The Rising" the 35th best song of the decade. It was named the 497th greatest songs on the 2010 edition of "Top 500 Greatest Songs of All Time" by Rolling Stone Magazine. VH1 placed it 81st on its list of the "100 Greatest Songs of the '00s".

In June 2026, CBS News included the song in its list of the 250 essential American songs of the past 250 years.

== Chart performance ==
Weekly chart performance for "The Rising"
Chart (2002–2003)	Peak position
Austria (Ö3 Austria Top 40)	56
Finland (Suomen virallinen lista)	11
Germany (GfK)	49
Italy (FIMI)	6
Netherlands (Dutch Top 40)	40
Netherlands (Single Top 100)	39
Norway (VG-lista)	5
Quebec (ADISQ)	3
Romania (Romanian Top 100)	9
Spain (Promusicae)	9
Sweden (Sverigetopplistan)	10
Switzerland (Schweizer Hitparade)	63
UK Singles (Official Charts)	94
US Billboard Hot 100	52
US Adult Contemporary (Billboard)	26
US Adult Pop Airplay (Billboard)	16
US Mainstream Rock Airplay (Billboard)	24
US Adult Alternative Airplay (Billboard)	1
Europe (Eurochart Hot 100)	65

== Live performances ==
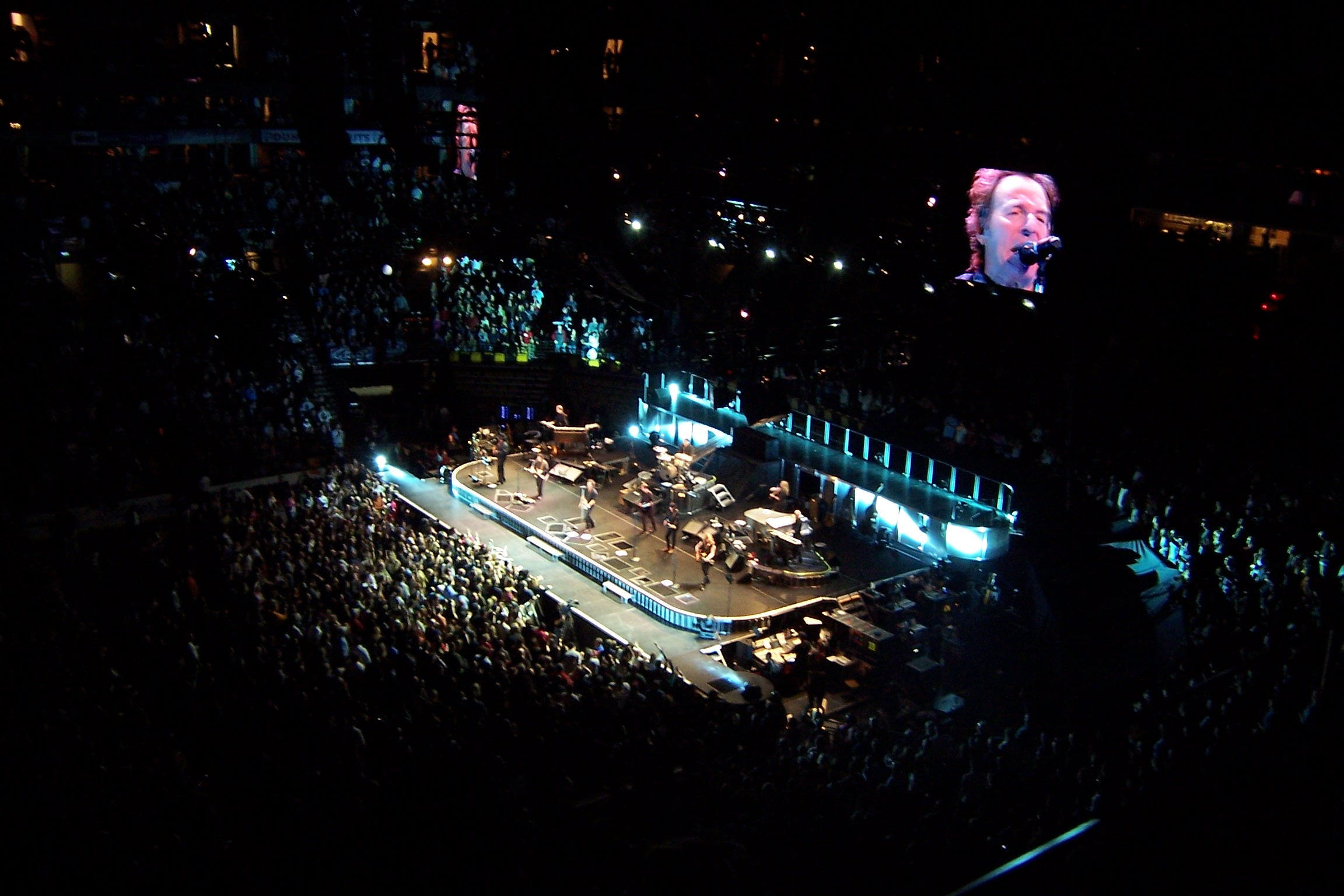
Eerie blue-white lighting accompanies a performance of "The Rising" during the Magic Tour in 2007.

"The Rising" played during Springsteen's last-ever stand of Giants Stadium shows in New Jersey in 2009. Soozie Tyrell played her key violin part as stadium was lit in red, until the final codas of the song, when the lighting changed to white.

"The Rising" was performed by Springsteen and the E Street Band on all promotional television appearances surrounding the album's release. It was then the "keynote song" throughout The Rising Tour of 2002-2003. By this is meant it was usually the opening song of the performance, or if not, was played second after some offbeat or obscure set list choice was played before it.

In its live arrangement "The Rising" underwent two significant changes: the oscillating violin and keyboards line that is understated on the record became much more prominent, with violinist and new E Streeter Soozie Tyrell featured, and Nils Lofgren took the "dream of life" contravocal lines towards the end of the song. In particular the violin-based opening of the song became instantly recognizable, and signalled the thematic if not literal beginning of all Rising Tour shows. "The Rising" was also played at the 2002 MTV Video Music Awards and the Grammy Awards of 2003 shows. The song is also performed in the key of C Major live as opposed to the key of B-flat major on the album.

That the difference between the bleak verses and the communal chorus was the key factor in interpreting "The Rising" was highlighted by Springsteen's own performances, when he and the audience raised their arms in unison during the latter. Indeed, many of the songs on the album had more universal interpretations available to them than just those associated with September 11, and "The Rising" proved to be no exception. This concept was further demonstrated by a country music star with rock sympathies, Keith Urban, who included a long interpolation of "The Rising" into his CMT Music Awards closing performance of his "Better Life", in tribute to, and in conjunction with accompanying choral members of, victims of Hurricane Katrina.

Placed in the middle of sets during the short 2004 Vote for Change tour, "The Rising" was greeted by a strong audience response, with political echoes for those fans so inclined. When the 2005 solo Devils & Dust Tour came around, Springsteen continued to feature "The Rising", but now on acoustic guitar; it usually appeared two-thirds of the way through the show, as a return to musical stability after one of his always-an-adventure multiple piano songs slots. "The Rising" was not played during the 2006 big folk Sessions Band Tour. "The Rising" returned to a prominent spot in Springsteen and the E Street Band's 2007 Magic Tour, placed between two of Magic's most politically oriented numbers, "Devil's Arcade" and "Last to Die"; indeed, Springsteen would say that the 30-second segue coming out of "The Rising" was what "the whole [show] is going to turn on ... that's what we're up there for."

"The Rising" continued to be featured as the penultimate song of the main set during Springsteen and the band's 2009 Working on a Dream Tour, where it drew a consistently strong audience reaction. And it was again a late-set staple during the subsequent 2012 Wrecking Ball Tour. On the 2014 High Hopes Tour, "The Rising" was moved up to be the main set closer for the majority of shows, and it is overall the 8th most popular Springsteen live song.

== Campaign and political use ==
During the 2008 U.S. presidential election, "The Rising" was first used as a closing campaign rally song by the John Edwards campaign. Despite the song's grim setting, the "Rise up" refrain matched the closing exhortation of Edwards' speeches. The Hillary Rodham Clinton campaign then began to use the song as well, especially at the end of her rallies or victory celebrations. Following Springsteen's April 2008 endorsement of Barack Obama, the Obama campaign began replacing U2's "City of Blinding Lights" with "The Rising" as their commencement-of-rally song.

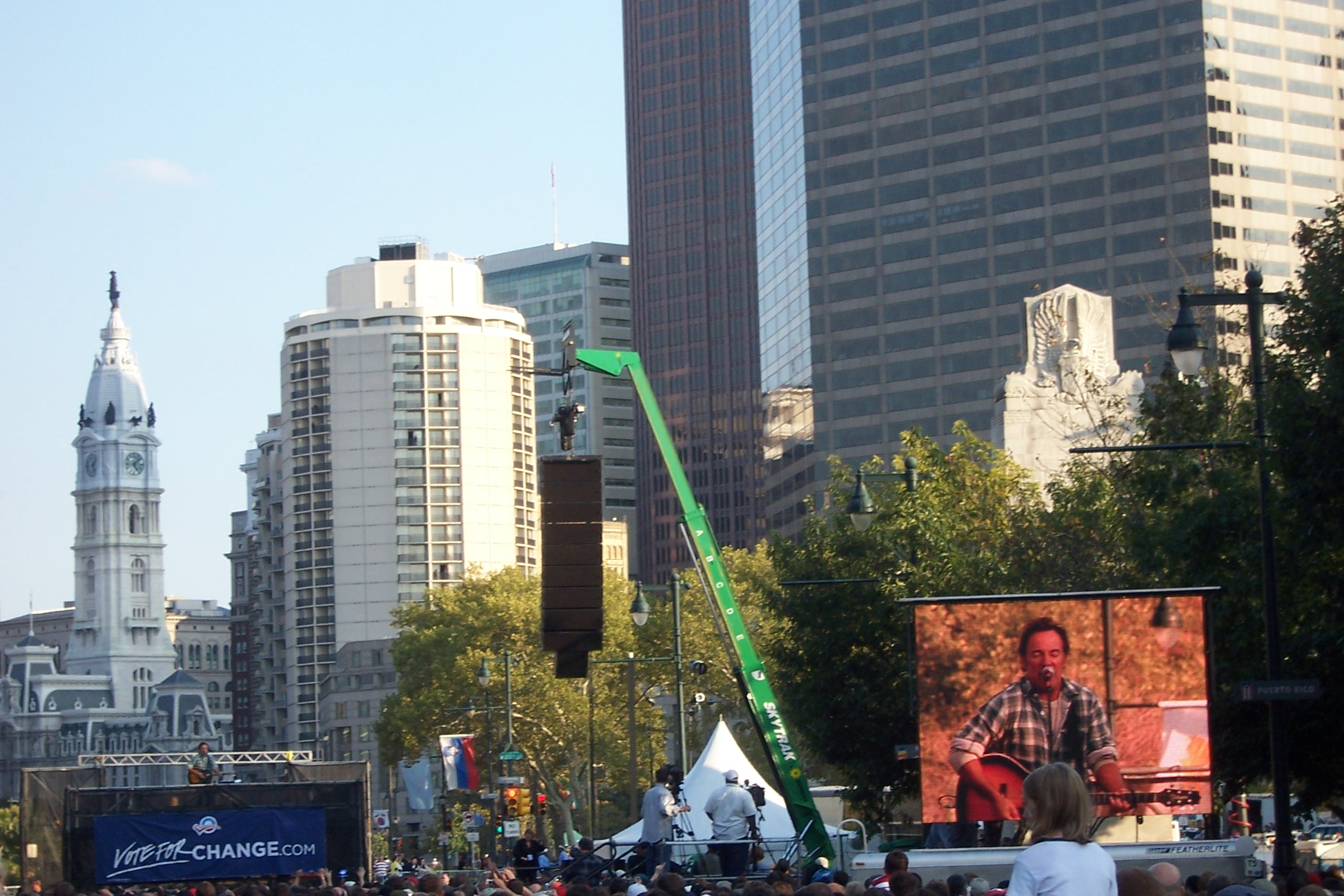
"The Rising" was performed during this October 4, 2008, Change Rocks voter registration rally on behalf of Barack Obama, on Philadelphia's Benjamin Franklin Parkway.

Springsteen himself would perform "The Rising" during his solo acoustic Change Rocks appearances during early October 2008 at Obama registration and vote rallies. The song was also played immediately following Obama's victorious presidential acceptance speech on the night of November 4, 2008 in Grant Park in Chicago. Rolling Stone later remarked of its use there, "when its metaphor of struggling through darkness was blasted at Obama's victory celebration, it became a national anthem for the 21st century."

Springsteen opened the January 18, 2009 We Are One: The Obama Inaugural Celebration at the Lincoln Memorial with the song. It was performed by Springsteen on acoustic guitar, backed by a 125-member female choir in red gowns; a writer for the American Folklife Center commented that, "Particularly in that arrangement, it draws on the gospel tradition. [It also draws on] the tradition of spirituals, and there's a lot of lyrics that speak to spirituals." When Springsteen was one of the recipients of Kennedy Center Honors in December 2009, the musical tribute to him concluded with Sting leading a performance of "The Rising" together with a large gospel choir. The intense rendition got Barack and Michelle Obama and the rest of the formal-dress audience out of their seats and swaying to the song's thematic development; Rolling Stone commented that the song "end[ed] the evening in an uplifting, change-the-world mode, as only Bruce's music can."

Springsteen himself remarked upon the distance the song had travelled, saying: "You write 'The Rising' for this, it gets picked up and used for that, so you end up here. If someone had told me in 2001 that 'you're going to sing this song at the inaugural concert for the first African-American president,' I'd have said, 'Huh?' But eight years go by, and that's where you find yourself. You're in there, you're swimming in the current of history and your music is doing the same thing."

Joe Biden's 2020 presidential campaign created a video for "The Rising", called "Rise Up" at the Democratic National Convention. It features video segments of people in the Black Lives Matter movement, as well as people united in the fight against COVID-19. Springsteen and his wife, Patti Scialfa, appear in the montage of people.

Nancy Wilson of Heart recorded a cover version of the song, released in October, 2020, just ahead of the 2020 presidential election.

== Use in sports ==
The Carolina Hurricanes used the song frequently as part of their in-game presentation during the course of their playoff run in 2006.

== Personnel ==
According to album liner notes:

- Bruce Springsteen - vocals, electric guitars, acoustic guitars, baritone guitars, harmonica
- Roy Bittan - keyboards, piano, mellotron, Kurzweil, pump organ, Korg M1, crumar
- Clarence Clemons - saxophone, backing vocals
- Danny Federici - Hammond B3, Vox Continental, Farfisa
- Nils Lofgren - electric guitar, Dobro, slide guitar, banjo, backing vocals
- Patti Scialfa - vocals
- Garry Tallent - bass
- Steven van Zandt - electric guitar, mandolin, backing vocals
- Max Weinberg - drums

Additional musicians:

- Soozie Tyrell - violin, backing vocals
- Jane Scarpantoni - cello

== See also ==
- The Rising, 9/11 attack memorial
