= Lonesome Day =

2002 single by Bruce Springsteen

Single by Bruce Springsteen

from the album The Rising
- Released: December 2, 2002
- Recorded: February–March 2002; Southern Tracks Recording Studio, Atlanta, Georgia
- Genre: Rock; country rock
- Length: 4:08
- Label: Columbia
- Songwriter: Bruce Springsteen
- Producer: Brendan O'Brien

Bruce Springsteen singles chronology
"The Rising" (2002)	"Lonesome Day" (2002)	"Waitin' on a Sunny Day" (2003)

"Lonesome Day" is a song written by Bruce Springsteen and initially performed by Springsteen and the E Street Band. It is the opening track of his 2002 album The Rising. It was released as a single as the follow-up to the title track on December 2, 2002 and reached #36 on the Billboard Adult Top 40 chart, #39 in the UK, and #47 in Sweden. It fared much better on the Adult Alternative Airplay chart, reaching #3.

== Content ==
"Lonesome Day" sets the tone for The Rising album as one of several songs on the album with lyrics that appear to be inspired by the September 11, 2001 attacks. However, like other songs on the album, the lyrics work well as a reflection of the general human condition as well as the specific incident that occurred on September 11. The narrator of the song is attempting to deal with the loneliness due to the loss of his (or her) beloved. The narrator sings that "It's going to be okay/If I can just get through this lonesome day." But although the narrator now grieves the loss, he realizes that he did not really know his beloved that well and he acknowledges that he had been less than perfect in his relationship with the now absent beloved:

Better ask questions before you shoot
Deceit and betrayal's bitter fruit
It's hard to swallow come time to pay
That taste on your tongue don't easily slip away
Let kingdom come
I'm going to find my way
Through this lonesome day.

The lyrics in the 2nd verse allude to the possibility of revenge: "A little revenge and this too shall pass." This is representative of one side of the conflicted feelings reflected in the album about the possible response to the September 11 attacks, where some songs like this one and "Empty Sky" allude to revenge and others, such as "Paradise" and "Worlds Apart" hope for mutual understanding. Springsteen biographer Dave Marsh interprets the lines in the 3rd verse that you "better ask questions before you shoot" as recognition that revenge will not work.

"Lonesome Day" also sets the tone for the album musically. It is a midtempo rock song that also has country music elements. Soozie Tyrell's strident violin is prominent, introducing one of several new musical textures that the E-Street Band employs on the album. Producer Brendan O'Brien himself plays a hurdy-gurdy, which musically hints that the narrator is remembering an innocent past that never was.

== Music video ==
The music video of the song was shot in Asbury Park, New Jersey and directed by Mark Pellington. Unlike most music videos, Springsteen recorded the song live in each take during shooting of the video, over a 16-hour period.

== Release ==
Since its initial appearance on The Rising, "Lonesome Day" has appeared on several subsequent Bruce Springsteen releases. A live performance from The Rising Tour was included on the DVD Live in Barcelona, and a live performance from the Working on a Dream Tour was included on the 2010 DVD London Calling: Live in Hyde Park. It was also included on the 2003 compilation album The Essential Bruce Springsteen and on the 2009 compilation album Bruce Springsteen & The E Street Band Greatest Hits.

== Charts ==
Weekly chart performance for "Lonesome Day"
Chart (2002)	Peak position
Europe (Eurochart Hot 100)	71
Belgium (Ultratip Bubbling Under Flanders)	18
Germany (GfK)	92
Italy (FIMI)	13
Netherlands (Dutch Tipparade 40)	4
Netherlands (Single Top 100)	51
Quebec (ADISQ)	24
Spain (Promusicae)	6
Sweden (Sverigetopplistan)	47
UK Singles (OCC)	39
US Adult Alternative Airplay (Billboard)	3
US Adult Pop Airplay (Billboard)	36
Scotland Singles (OCC)	41

== Release history ==
Region	Date	Format(s)	Label	Ref.
United Kingdom	December 2, 2002	CD 1; CD 2	Columbia	
Belgium	December 4, 2002	CD; maxi CD	Columbia	
