= Bruce Springsteen & The E Street Band: Live in New York City =

Documentary film directed by Chris Hilson (2001)

Bruce Springsteen & the E Street Band: Live In New York City is a concert film done by HBO, featuring the first ever major televised Bruce Springsteen concert. It was later released on DVD with eleven extra songs not televised, and as a CD of the same name.

All of these forms document Springsteen and the E Street Band's highly successful 1999–2000 Reunion Tour, their first concert tour together in eleven years.

== Film ==
Running 90 minutes, the film was recorded at concerts on June 29 and July 1, 2000. These were the final two shows in the Band's ten-show tour-ending run at Madison Square Garden in New York City. HBO received six Emmy Award nominations (including "Outstanding Variety, Music or Comedy Special") and won two Awards for the film.

=== Setlist ===
1. "My Love Will Not Let You Down"
2. "Prove It All Night"
3. "Two Hearts"
4. "Atlantic City"
5. "Mansion on the Hill"
6. "The River"
7. "Youngstown"
8. "Murder Incorporated"
9. "Badlands"
10. "Out in the Street"
11. "Tenth Avenue Freeze-Out"
12. "Born to Run"
13. "Land of Hope and Dreams"
14. "American Skin (41 Shots)"

"Born to Run" was a late addition to the special. As a result of this, there is a crossfade into and out of the song on the film and DVD and there is a complete fade-out before it on the CD. Also, its placement on the CD (at the end of the first disc, before "Tenth Avenue Freeze-Out") was a result of this late decision. It is not listed as a track on the back of some pressings of the CD, but is on all pressings of the DVD.

Springsteen debuted many new songs over the final leg of the tour, and two were included on this special:

- " Land of Hope and Dreams", a lengthy American ode for which a studio version would not be released until 2012's Wrecking Ball.
- "American Skin (41 Shots)," a controversial ballad about the shooting of Amadou Diallo. A studio version was released as a rare promo single in 2001. Springsteen re-recorded the song in 2013 and released this version on his 2014 High Hopes album.

Also, many songs on the tour were performed with significant differences from their recorded versions. The songs on this special like that were:

- "Two Hearts" included a short cover of Marvin Gaye's "It Takes Two"
- "Atlantic City" and "Youngstown," from two of Springsteen's solo folk albums, were performed as rock songs, with the full band backing Springsteen.
- "Mansion on the Hill," another folk song, was also performed with the entire band, but much mellower and softer than the other two.
- "The River" was performed not on guitar, but as an extended saxophone and piano ballad.
- "Tenth Avenue Freeze-Out" was extended to include the band introductions, as well one of Springsteen's monologues and a short cover of Al Green's "Take Me to the River", a portion of "It's All Right" written by Curtis Mayfield and a short version of his own "Red Headed Woman" during Patti Scialfa's intro, afterwards performing a verse from one of her own songs ("Rumble Doll") with the band.

== DVD ==
Disc one

Contains the entire HBO special, plus credits, a photo gallery, and New York City Serenade, a 19-minute documentary about the concerts.

1. "My Love Will Not Let You Down"
2. "Prove It All Night"
3. "Two Hearts"
4. "Atlantic City"
5. "Mansion on the Hill"
6. "The River"
7. "Youngstown"
8. "Murder Incorporated"
9. "Badlands"
10. "Out in the Street"
11. "Tenth Avenue Freeze-Out"
12. "Born to Run"
13. "Land of Hope and Dreams"
14. "American Skin (41 Shots)"

Disc two

Contains the following previously unseen performances:

1. "Backstreets"
2. "Don't Look Back"
3. "Darkness on the Edge of Town"
4. "Lost in the Flood"
5. "Born in the U.S.A."
6. "Jungleland"
7. "Light of Day"
8. "The Promise"
9. "Thunder Road"
10. "Ramrod"
11. "If I Should Fall Behind"

In audio only, under the end credits:

"The E Street Shuffle"

Again, some of the songs were performed with significant alterations from their recorded versions.

- "Born in the U.S.A." was performed as a solo folk/blues song with Springsteen on slide 12-string guitar.
- "Light of Day" included a prolonged rap about the tour and a series of jokes comparing New York unfavorably to New Jersey.

Also noteworthy is that this performance of "Lost in the Flood" was the first performance of that song since 1978.

== CD ==
Live in New York City

Live album by Bruce Springsteen & the E Street Band
- Released: March 27, 2001
- Recorded: June 29–July 1, 2000
- Genre: Rock
- Length: 143:57
- Label: Sony Records
- Producers: Bruce Springsteen and Chuck Plotkin

Bruce Springsteen & the E Street Band chronology
18 Tracks (1999)	Live in New York City (2001)	The Rising (2002)

Bruce Springsteen chronology
18 Tracks (1999)	Live in New York City (2001)	The Rising (2002)

Professional ratings
Review scores
Source	Rating
Allmusic Link	3/5 stars
Pitchfork	6.8/10
Tom Hull	B+
Uncut	4/5 stars

Released on March 27, 2001, the album reached #5 on the Billboard 200 and #1 on the Billboard Internet Album Charts. The album was later re-released on SACD with a 5.1-surround multichannel mix; the SACD running order is identical to that of the CD release.

Disc one
No.	Title	Length
1.	"My Love Will Not Let You Down"	5:38
2.	"Prove It All Night"	6:16
3.	"Two Hearts"	4:29
4.	"Atlantic City"	6:36
5.	"Mansion On The Hill"	4:19
6.	"The River"	11:16
7.	"Youngstown"	6:16
8.	"Murder Incorporated"	6:07
9.	"Badlands"	5:43
10.	"Out in the Street"	6:39
11.	"Born To Run"	5:56

Disc two
No.	Title	Length
1.	"Tenth Avenue Freeze-Out" (Contains a portion of "Red Headed Woman", "Take Me to the River" by Al Green and Mabon "Teenie" Hodges and "It's All Right" by Curtis Mayfield)	16:09
2.	"Land of Hope and Dreams"	9:46
3.	"American Skin (41 Shots)"	7:45
4.	"Lost In The Flood"	7:24
5.	"Born In The U.S.A."	5:46
6.	"Don't Look Back"	3:19
7.	"Jungleland"	10:54
8.	"Ramrod"	6:28
9.	"If I Should Fall Behind"	6:09

== Personnel ==
Personnel taken from Bruce Springsteen & The E Street Band: Live In New York City liner notes.

- Bruce Springsteen – lead vocals, guitar, harmonica
- Roy Bittan – keyboards
- Clarence Clemons – saxophone, percussion
- Danny Federici – keyboards
- Nils Lofgren – guitar, backing vocals
- Patti Scialfa – acoustic guitar, backing vocals
- Garry Tallent – bass guitar
- Steven Van Zandt – guitar, backing vocals
- Max Weinberg – drums

== Charts ==
Chart (2001)	Peak position
Australian Albums (ARIA)	30
Austrian Albums (Ö3 Austria)	10
Belgian Albums (Ultratop Flanders)	7
Belgian Albums (Ultratop Wallonia)	38
Canadian Albums (Billboard)	19
Danish Albums (Hitlisten)	9
Dutch Albums (Album Top 100)	31
European Albums (Music & Media)	3
Finnish Albums (Suomen virallinen lista)	20
French Albums (SNEP)	10
German Albums (Offizielle Top 100)	9
Irish Albums (IRMA)	22
Italian Albums (FIMI)	1
Norwegian Albums (VG-lista)	3
Scottish Albums (Official Charts)	11
Spanish Albums (Billboard)	2
Swedish Albums (Sverigetopplistan)	3
Swiss Albums (Schweizer Hitparade)	13
UK Albums (Official Charts)	12
US Billboard 200	5

== Certifications ==
Region	Certification	Certified units/sales
Australia (ARIA) DVD	2× Platinum	30,000^{^}
France (SNEP) DVD	Gold	10,000^{*}
Germany (BVMI) DVD	Gold	25,000^{^}
Spain (Promusicae) album	Gold	50,000^{^}
Spain (Promusicae) DVD	2× Platinum	50,000^{^}
Sweden (GLF) DVD	Gold	10,000^{^}
United Kingdom (BPI) CD	Silver	60,000^{^}
United Kingdom (BPI) DVD	Platinum	50,000^{^}
United States (RIAA) CD	Platinum	500,000^{^}
United States (RIAA) DVD	3× Platinum	150,000^{^}
^{*} Sales figures based on certification alone.^{^} Shipments figures based on certification alone.
