= Darkness on the Edge of Town (song) =

Song by Bruce Springsteen

from the album Darkness on the Edge of Town
- Released: June 2, 1978
- Recorded: March 10, 1978 (completed)
- Studio: The Record Plant, New York
- Genre: Rock, country rock
- Length: 4:30
- Label: Columbia
- Songwriter: Bruce Springsteen
- Producers: Bruce Springsteen, Jon Landau

"Darkness on the Edge of Town" is the last song on the 1978 album of the same name, Darkness on the Edge of Town, by Bruce Springsteen. It was the last song recorded and mixed, and in April 1978 it was designated the title song to a thematic album whose songs portray the struggles of the less-fortunate, not only to survive, but to keep their spirit and will to live. The title track portrays a hard-luck loser in life who refuses to give up. Springsteen's fourth album, released three years after his 1975 effort Born to Run, was delayed two years because of legal problems with his former manager, Mike Appel. Expectations were high after he took one year to complete the album.

== Background ==
"Darkness on the Edge of Town" ("Darkness") is the story of a hard-luck loser, who keeps his spirit alive through street racing on the Edge. In his world, "no one asks any questions, or looks too long in your face". He describes his desperation, "some folks are born into a good life, other folks get it anyway anyhow, I lost my money and I lost my wife, them things don't seem to matter much to me now", and then what he plans to do about it. "Tonight I'll be on that hill 'cause I can't stop, I'll be on that hill with everything I got, where lives are on the line and dreams are found and lost, I'll be there on time and I'll pay the cost, for wanting things that can only be found in the darkness on the edge of town".

"Darkness on the Edge of Town" was conceived in early 1976, shortly after the Born to Run tour ended. Indeed, the title can be found in two lists of songs that were penned sometime in 1976, with rumors that band rehearsals during 1976 at Bruce's home at Holmdel, NJ included versions of "Darkness On The Edge Of Town". With music and some lyrics written by February 1976, the song was subtitled "The Racer" for a time.

However, its lyrics were not completed as of June 1, 1977, the first day of the Darkness on the Edge of Town recording sessions. Bruce and the E Street Band worked on the song for five days in June 1977, then set it aside, incomplete, for the rest of the year. On March 8, 1978, over two months after the sessions were completed, Springsteen called in his band, and a new version of "Darkness" was recorded from scratch, completed on March 10, and mixed on March 30, just in time to make it on the album as the closing track. The album was released on June 2, 1978. It is thought possible that Springsteen was working on "Darkness" all along, during the nine months that passed, and came up with the words at the last moment, which he did twice on Born to Run, with "Backstreets" and "She's the One".

== Release ==
Rolling Stone designated the song at number 8 on a list of the 100 greatest Bruce Springsteen songs. Though not released as a single, it was included on many live albums and on the compilations The Essential Bruce Springsteen (2003) and Greatest Hits (2009). The song is also one of Springsteen's most popular concert songs (13th most played song).

== Personnel ==
According to authors Philippe Margotin and Jean-Michel Guesdon:

- Bruce Springsteen – vocals, guitars
- Roy Bittan – piano
- Clarence Clemons – tambourine
- Danny Federici – organ, glockenspiel
- Garry Tallent – bass
- Steven Van Zandt – guitar
- Max Weinberg – drums
