= Born in the U.S.A. (song) =

1984 song by Bruce Springsteen

Single by Bruce Springsteen

from the album Born in the U.S.A.
- B-side: "Shut Out the Light"
- Released: October 1984
- Recorded: April 1982
- Studio: Power Station, New York City
- Genre: Rock and roll; heartland rock
- Length: 4:38
- Label: Columbia
- Songwriter: Bruce Springsteen
- Producers: Jon Landau; Chuck Plotkin; Bruce Springsteen; Steve Van Zandt

Bruce Springsteen singles chronology
"No Surrender" (1984)	"Born in the U.S.A." (1984)	"I'm on Fire" (1985)

Audio sample
- file; help

Music video
- "Born in the U.S.A." on YouTube

"Born in the U.S.A." is a song written and performed by American singer-songwriter Bruce Springsteen and released in 1984 on the album of the same name as its opening track. One of Springsteen's best-known songs, it was ranked 275th on Rolling Stone's list of "The 500 Greatest Songs of All Time", and in 2001, the RIAA's Songs of the Century placed the song 59th (out of 365). The song's "anthemic chorus contrasted with the verses' desperate narrative" portrays a Vietnam veteran's alienation after the war.

== Recording history ==
This song was written in 1981 as the title song for a film that Paul Schrader was contemplating making and in which Springsteen was considering starring (Light of Day starring Michael J. Fox). Springsteen thanks Schrader in the liner notes of the album Born in the U.S.A.

Casual home demos were made later that year, following the completion of The River Tour. A more formal solo acoustic guitar demo was made on January 3, 1982, at Springsteen's home in Colts Neck, New Jersey during the long session that constituted most of the Nebraska album released later that year. Acoustic versions of several other songs that eventually appeared on the Born in the U.S.A. album were also on this demo, including "Child Bride" (an early version of "Working on the Highway") and "Downbound Train". However, Springsteen's manager/producer Jon Landau and others felt that the song did not have the right melody or music to match the lyrics, and also did not fit in well with the rest of the nascent Nebraska material. As a result, the song was shelved, although the recording later surfaced in the late 1990s on the Tracks and 18 Tracks outtake collections.

Full E Street Band versions were recorded during the Electric Nebraska sessions, with the Born in the U.S.A. album take 4 completed on April 27, 1982, at Power Station studios. Much of the arrangement was made up on the spot, including Roy Bittan's opening synthesizer riff (which was played on a Yamaha CS-80) and what producer Chuck Plotkin nicknamed Max Weinberg's "exploding drums". The famous snare drum sound on this record, notable for its gated reverb, was obtained by engineer Toby Scott running the top snare microphone through a broken reverb plate with a fixed four-second decay and into a Kepex noise gate. This is the version that appeared on the Born in the U.S.A. album, a full two years later. The studio recording also originally ended with a lengthy jam session, which was later edited for the song's commercial release.

== Themes ==
"Born in the U.S.A." has been widely misunderstood. It has been treated as a flag-waving paean to America by right-wing politicians like Ronald Reagan and Pat Buchanan, reacting to the patriotic tone of the song's chorus, without seeming to acknowledge the bitter critique of American policy and society present in the lyrics. The song presents a Vietnam veteran as a tragic figure alienated upon his return from the war.

Historians Jefferson Cowie and Lauren Boehm, writing in American Quarterly journal, identified three main themes. First, the emotional structure of the song, featuring a tension between an anthemic, jingoistic chorus and the grim narrative of a Vietnam veteran. Second, the Vietnam War as symbols, "to the social and economic siege of American blue-collar communities." Third, "economic devastation, which uproots the material basis of working-class identity only to replant it in the acidic soil of nationalism." The article quotes Springsteen saying that the working-class man was facing

"a spiritual crisis, in which [he] is left lost. It's like he has nothing left to tie him into society anymore. He's isolated from the government. Isolated from his job. Isolated from his family ... to the point where nothing makes sense."

== Political reactions ==
In late August 1984, the Born in the U.S.A. album was selling very well, its songs were frequently aired on radio stations, and the associated tour was drawing considerable press. Springsteen shows at the Capital Centre outside of Washington, D.C. thus attracted even more media attention, in particular from CBS Evening News correspondent Bernard Goldberg, who saw Springsteen as a modern-day Horatio Alger story. Conservative columnist George Will, after attending a show, published a piece on September 13, 1984, titled "A Yankee Doodle Springsteen", in which he praised Springsteen as an exemplar of classic American values. He wrote: "I have not got a clue about Springsteen's politics, if any, but flags get waved at his concerts while he sings songs about hard times. He is no whiner, and the recitation of closed factories and other problems always seems punctuated by a grand, cheerful affirmation: 'Born in the U.S.A.!'" The 1984 presidential campaign was in full stride at the time, and Will had connections to President Ronald Reagan's re-election organization. Will thought that Springsteen might endorse Reagan (not knowing that Springsteen did not support him), and got the notion pushed up to high-level Reagan advisor Michael Deaver. His staffers made inquiries to Springsteen's management, which were politely rebuffed.

Nevertheless, at a campaign stop in Hammonton, New Jersey, on September 19, 1984, Reagan added the following to his speech:

America's future rests in a thousand dreams inside your hearts; it rests in the message of hope in the songs of a man so many young Americans admire: New Jersey's own Bruce Springsteen. And helping you make those dreams come true is what this job of mine is all about.

The press immediately expressed skepticism that Reagan knew anything about Springsteen, and asked what his favorite Springsteen song was; "Born to Run" was the response from staffers. Johnny Carson then joked on The Tonight Show, "If you believe that, I've got a couple of tickets to the Mondale–Ferraro inaugural ball I'd like to sell you."

During a September 21 concert in Pittsburgh, Springsteen responded negatively by introducing his song "Johnny 99", a song about an unemployed auto worker who turns to murder, "The President was mentioning my name the other day, and I kinda got to wondering what his favorite album musta been. I don't think it was the Nebraska album. I don't think he's been listening to this one."

A few days after that, presidential challenger Walter Mondale said, "Bruce Springsteen may have been born to run but he wasn't born yesterday", and then claimed to have been endorsed by Springsteen. Springsteen manager Jon Landau denied any such endorsement, and the Mondale campaign issued a correction.

In 2000, Reason editor and libertarian journalist Brian Doherty, noting that political song lyrics are often either misunderstood or not understood at all by fans, wrote, "But who's to say Reagan wasn't right to insist the song was an upper? When I hear those notes and that drumbeat, and the Boss' best arena-stentorian, shout-groan vocals come over the speakers, I feel like I'm hearing the national anthem."

"Born in the U.S.A." was heard at rallies for president Donald Trump and outside the hospital where he was being treated for COVID-19 in October 2020. On this topic, Josh Terry of Vice wrote: "That 'Born in the U.S.A.' has been used for decades in political rallies for right-wing causes for four decades is confusing. Springsteen himself has gone on record calling Trump 'a flagrant, toxic narcissist,' a 'moron,' and a 'threat to our democracy.' But more than the Boss' own views, the song is the furthest thing from a nationalist anthem."

== General reaction ==
"Born in the U.S.A." peaked at No. 9 on the Billboard Hot 100 and No. 8 on the Cashbox Top 100 in January 1985. It was the third of a record-tying seven Top 10 hit singles to be released from the Born in the U.S.A. album. In addition it made the top 10 of Billboard's Rock Tracks chart, indicating solid play on album-oriented rock stations. The physical single was certified Gold by the RIAA on July 23, 1999, and additionally it has sold over a million digital copies in the U.S. by July 2016 after becoming available for downloads. The song became a hit in the UK in 1985, when it was released as a double A-side single with "I'm on Fire", reaching No. 5 on the UK Singles Chart.

Beyond the 1984 presidential campaign, "Born in the U.S.A." was widely misinterpreted as purely nationalistic by those who heard the anthemic chorus but not the bitter verses. For example, Cash Box called it a "straight-ahead anthem that celebrates America’s traditional values and the common man."

In June 2026, CBS News included the song in its list of the 250 essential American songs of the past 250 years.

== Music video ==
The music video for "Born in the U.S.A." was directed by noted filmmaker John Sayles. It consisted of video concert footage of Springsteen and the E Street Band performing the song, synchronized with audio from the studio recording. This footage was intermixed with compelling mid-1980s scenes of working-class America, emphasizing images that had some connection with the song, including Vietnam veterans, Amerasian children, assembly lines, oil refineries, cemeteries, and the like, finishing with a recreation of the album's cover, with Springsteen posing in front of an American flag.

== Live performances and subsequent versions ==
On Springsteen's 1984–1985 Born in the U.S.A. Tour, "Born in the U.S.A." almost always opened the concerts. One such version is included on the Live/1975–85 album.

On the 1988 Tunnel of Love Express Tour, "Born in the U.S.A." generally closed the first set, and on the 1992–1993 "Other Band" Tour, it appeared frequently at the end of the second set. These were both full-band versions, although the latter stressed guitar parts more than the familiar synthesizer line.

Beginning with the 1995–1997 solo acoustic Ghost of Tom Joad Tour and associated promotional media appearances, Springsteen radically recast "Born in the U.S.A." once again, playing an acoustic guitar version that was unlike both the original Nebraska and full-band performances. This was a stinging, snarling rendition that only included the title phrase twice. This was both in connection with the Tom Joad Tour's wan mood as well as Springsteen's attempt to make clear the song's original and only purpose; in his introduction to the song, he said he still wasn't convinced the song had been misinterpreted, but now as the songwriter he was "going to get the last say." Fan reaction was divided, with some greatly liking the new arrangement and others thinking the song's musical ironies had been lost.

During the 1999–2000 Reunion Tour, "Born in the U.S.A." was played relatively frequently, but only in the solo acoustic version, now on 12-string slide guitar. Such a performance is included on the DVD and CD Live in New York City. Not until 2002's the Rising Tour and 2004's political Vote for Change tour did the full-band "Born in the U.S.A." make a regular comeback; the song is featured on the Live in Barcelona DVD, in which the full-band version is heard.

Towards the end of Springsteen's solo Devils & Dust Tour in 2005, another version of "Born in the U.S.A." was unveiled, with Springsteen performing it using an amplified "stomping board" and an ultra-distorting vocal "bullet microphone", two devices designed to render any song utterly incomprehensible to all but the sharpest of ears. This slot was normally reserved for the dourest of Nebraska material.

During the Magic and Working on a Dream tours, the song was played only 15 times, even though other songs from the album, such as "Dancing in the Dark", "Bobby Jean", and "Glory Days", continued to be regulars. It was used as an opener on the radio broadcast July 4, 2008, show in Gothenburg, Sweden.

== Track listing ==
=== 7": Columbia / 38-04680 ===
1. "Born in the U.S.A." – 4:39
2. "Shut Out the Light" – 3:45
- The B-side of the single, "Shut Out the Light", was another Vietnam veteran's tale.
- also released on CD in 1988 (Columbia / 38K-04680-S1)

=== 12": Columbia / 44-05147 ===
1. "Born in the U.S.A." (The Freedom Mix) – 7:07
2. "Born in the U.S.A." (Dub) – 7:27
3. "Born in the U.S.A." (Radio Mix) – 6:01
- All remixes done by Arthur Baker

== Personnel ==
According to authors Philippe Margotin and Jean-Michel Guesdon, and the album's liner notes:

- Bruce Springsteen – vocals, guitars
- Roy Bittan – synthesizer
- Clarence Clemons – maracas
- Danny Federici – glockenspiel, piano
- Garry Tallent – bass
- Steven Van Zandt – acoustic guitar
- Max Weinberg – drums

== Charts ==
=== Weekly charts ===
Chart (1984–2008)	Peak position
Australia (Kent Music Report)	2
Austria (Ö3 Austria Top 40)	13
Belgium (Ultratop 50 Flanders)	9
Canada Top Singles (RPM)	11
Europe (European Hot 100 Singles) with "I'm on Fire"	5
Finland (Suomen virallinen lista)	19
Ireland (IRMA) with "I'm on Fire"	1
Italy (FIMI)	20
Netherlands (Dutch Top 40)	10
Netherlands (Single Top 100)	5
New Zealand (Recorded Music NZ)	1
Norway (VG-lista)	20
Quebec (ADISQ)	49
South Africa	25
Sweden (Sverigetopplistan)	11
UK Singles (Official Charts) with "I'm on Fire"	5
US Billboard Hot 100	9
US Mainstream Rock (Billboard)	8
US Cash Box Hot 100	8

Chart (2025)	Peak position
Japan Hot Overseas (Billboard Japan)	14

=== Year end charts ===
Chart (1985)	Position
Australia (Kent Music Report)	16
Belgium (Ultratop)	99
Canada Top Singles (RPM)	95
Netherlands (Dutch Top 40)	76
Netherlands (Single Top 100)	60
New Zealand (Recorded Music NZ)	22
US Billboard Hot 100	92

== Certifications ==
Region	Certification	Certified units/sales
Australia (ARIA)	3× Platinum	210,000^{‡}
Denmark (IFPI Danmark)	Platinum	90,000^{‡}
Germany (BVMI)	Gold	250,000^{‡}
Italy (FIMI)	Platinum	70,000^{‡}
New Zealand (RMNZ)	2× Platinum	60,000^{‡}
Portugal (AFP)	Gold	20,000^{‡}
Spain (Promusicae)	Platinum	60,000^{‡}
United Kingdom (BPI)	Platinum	600,000^{‡}
United States (RIAA)	3× Platinum	3,000,000^{‡}
^{‡} Sales+streaming figures based on certification alone.

== Covers and parodies ==
The song has appeared on recordings ranging from instrumental bluegrass collections to children's music albums (sung by groups of children). Even the London Symphony Orchestra has performed their take on the song.

In 1985, Patti LaBelle covered the song on her live album. Jazz-funk bassist Stanley Clarke recorded the song for his 1985 release, Find Out!. The Allmusic describes this version as "a black man's parody of white arena rock, with Springsteen's bitter lyric ground out rap-style by Clarke." Eric Rigler has recorded an instrumental bagpipe version of the song that has appeared on various Springsteen tribute albums since 2001. Swedish-Argentinian singer-songwriter José González performed a solo acoustic version for a time, choosing not to sing the song's title refrain. Singer-songwriter Richard Shindell covered the song in concerts, performing solo and playing bouzouki. Shindell recorded the song for his album South of Delia. This Morning presenter Matt Johnson performed the song as Bruce Springsteen on week 6 of the ITV show 'Your Face Sounds Familiar'. At the 2013 MusiCares Person of the Year ceremony, the song was covered by Neil Young & Crazy Horse with the help of Nils Lofgren; this is ironic for two reasons: one, Neil Young was born in Canada and Lofgren was a member of both Crazy Horse and the E Street Band.

There are a number of "Born in the U.S.A." parodies. For example, Cheech and Chong's 1985 comic-political "Born in East L.A." and Mad featured a parody written by Frank Jacobs in its July 1985 issue, called "Porn in the U.S.A.". A group of Sesame Street characters (billed as "Bruce Stringbean and the S. Street Band") performed a version of the song called "Barn in the U.S.A." for the album Born to Add. In Canadian Bacon, a Michael Moore film about a Cold War scenario between Canada and the United States, a group of Americans are travelling across Canada while singing along to "Born in the U.S.A.". In an apparent nod to the widespread misunderstanding of the lyrics, the characters are only capable of singing the chorus of the song and trail off during the verse. With Springsteen's permission, rap group 2 Live Crew released "Banned in the U.S.A.", a parody of "Born in the U.S.A." released to draw attention to 2 Live Crew's First Amendment troubles.

== See also ==
- List of anti-war songs
