= My City of Ruins =

2002 song performed by Bruce Springsteen

Song by Bruce Springsteen

from the album The Rising
- Released: July 30, 2002
- Recorded: March 2002 at Southern Tracks Recording Studio in Atlanta, Georgia
- Studio: TVNZ
- Genre: Rock; gospel
- Length: 5:00
- Label: Columbia
- Songwriter: Bruce Springsteen
- Producer: Brendan O'Brien

"My City of Ruins" is a song written and performed by American rock singer Bruce Springsteen. Originally written as an elegy for Asbury Park, New Jersey, "My City of Ruins" took on new meaning as a message of hope following the September 11 attacks. The song was included as the final track on Springsteen's 2002 album The Rising; it was released as a single in New Zealand in 2011, charting at number 17.

== History ==
"My City of Ruins" is "a song with a stately gospel-hymn feel that bemoaned the hard times that had hit...Asbury Park, and that was meant to inspire people to help in the city’s resurrection". Springsteen played the song for the first time on December 17, 2000 at Asbury Park Convention Hall. "My City of Ruins" is organized around the melody line of Curtis Mayfield's "People Get Ready".

=== September 11 association ===
"My City of Ruins" took on a new meaning soon after the September 11 attacks, when "its lyrics of hope and rebirth [became] a rallying cry". Springsteen performed the song live at the America: A Tribute to Heroes national telethon 10 days after the attacks. With a guitar and a harmonica, Springsteen introduced the number as "a prayer for our fallen brothers and sisters". Springsteen's live performance of "My City of Ruins" was included on the December 2001 America: A Tribute to Heroes album.

=== Studio recording ===
A studio recording of "My City of Ruins" was included as the concluding track of Springsteen's 2002 album The Rising. According to Jay Lustig of NJArts.net, the "title track of The Rising is its centerpiece, but 'My City of Ruins' provides its climax, with its unbearable sadness and then, somehow emerging from that, the hunger to join together and start over again". In 2019, NJArts.net listed "My City of Ruins" as Springsteen's fourth-best song of the past 30 years.

=== Christchurch, New Zealand earthquake ===
"My City of Ruins" was played by New Zealand television stations during coverage of the February 2011 Christchurch earthquake, and became an unofficial anthem of the city in the weeks and months that followed. Springsteen played the song and dedicated it to the city on the sixth anniversary of the earthquake during his 2017 tour of Australia and New Zealand.

"My City of Ruins" was released as a single in New Zealand in 2011, charting at number 17.

=== Notable covers ===
Eddie Vedder performed the song at the 32nd Annual Kennedy Center Honors as part of the multi-artist tribute to Bruce Springsteen, who was one of five recipients of the honor in 2009. Vedder's cover of the song was made available on iTunes to raise funds for Haiti earthquake disaster relief efforts. The song entered the Hot 100 the following month, peaking at number 92.

== Legacy ==
In June 2026, CBS News included the song in its list of the 250 essential American songs of the past 250 years.
