= Tower Theater, Philadelphia 1975 =

Tower Theatre, Upper Darby 1975

Live album by Bruce Springsteen and the E Street Band
- Released: February 10, 2015
- Recorded: December 31, 1975
- Genre: Rock
- Length: 2:25:55
- Producer: Jimmy Iovine, Dave Hewitt

Bruce Springsteen and the E Street Band chronology
The Agora, Cleveland 1978 (2014)	Tower Theatre, Upper Darby 1975 (2015)	Nassau Coliseum, New York 1980 (2015)

Tower Theater, Upper Darby 1975 is a live album by Bruce Springsteen and The E Street Band, released in February 2015 and was the third official release through the Bruce Springsteen Archives. The show was originally recorded at the Tower Theater in Upper Darby Township, Pennsylvania, on December 31, 1975.

The concert is available on CD and digital download.

== Background ==
The last night of 1975 was also the last night of the Born to Run tour proper. Engineer Jimmy Iovine brought The Record Plant Remote truck out for the occasion. Front of House recordings of this show have circulated for years, along with partial tapes of stereo mixes from the multitracks. This marks the first time the entire show has been mixed for release.

== Track listing ==
All tracks by Bruce Springsteen, except where noted.

=== Set one ===
1. "Intro" – 1:14
2. "Night" – 3:25
3. "Tenth Avenue Freeze-Out" – 4:12
4. "Spirit in the Night" – 7:12
5. "Does This Bus Stop at 82nd Street?" – 5:09
6. "It's My Life" – 8:04 (Roger Atkins/Carl D'Errico)
  - Originally recorded by The Animals
7. "She's the One" – 6:37
8. "Born to Run" – 4:38
9. "Pretty Flamingo" – 12:36 (Mark Barkan)
  - Originally recorded by Manfred Mann
10. "It's Hard to Be a Saint in the City" – 6:13
11. "Backsteets" – 8:53
12. "Mountain of Love" – 3:36 (Harold Dorman)
  - Originally recorded by Harold Dorman
13. "Jungleland" – 12:32
14. "Rosalita (Come Out Tonight)" – 14:52

=== Encore ===
1. "4th of July, Asbury Park (Sandy)" – 7:29
2. "Detroit Medley" – 13:48
  - "Devil With a Blue Dress On" (William "Mickey" Stevenson/Shorty Long) Originally recorded by Mitch Ryder and The Detroit Wheels
  - "See See Rider" (Gertrude "Ma" Rainey/Lena Arant) Originally recorded by Ma Rainey
  - "Good Golly Miss Molly" (Blackwell/Marascalco) Originally recorded by Little Richard
  - "Jenny Take a Ride" (Crewe/Johnson/Penniman) Originally recorded by Mitch Ryder and The Detroit Wheels
3. "Quarter to Three" – 10:46
4. "Thunder Road" – 6:45
5. "Twist and Shout" – 7:55 (Phil Medley/Bert Berns)
  - Most famously recorded by The Isley Brothers and The Beatles

== Personnel ==
- Bruce Springsteen – lead vocals, guitars, harmonica
- Roy Bittan – piano
- Clarence Clemons – saxophone, percussion, background vocals
- Danny Federici – organ, electronic glockenspiel, accordion
- Garry Tallent – bass guitar
- Steven Van Zandt – guitars, background vocals
- Max Weinberg – drums
- Jimmy Iovine – recording engineer
- Dave Hewitt – assistant engineer
- Toby Scott – mastering engineer
