= Hammersmith Odeon, London '75 =

Live album by Bruce Springsteen and the E Street Band
- Released: February 28, 2006
- Recorded: November 18, 1975
- Venue: Hammersmith Odeon, London
- Genre: Rock
- Length: 124:52
- Label: Columbia
- Producer: Bruce Springsteen, Jon Landau, Barbara Carr, Thom Zimny

Bruce Springsteen and the E Street Band chronology
The Essential Bruce Springsteen (2003)	Hammersmith Odeon, London '75 (2006)	Magic (2007)

Bruce Springsteen chronology
Devils & Dust (2005)	Hammersmith Odeon, London '75 (2006)	We Shall Overcome: The Seeger Sessions (2006)

Professional ratings
Review scores
Source	Rating
AbsolutePunk	9.6/10 stars
AllMusic	4.5/5 stars
The Guardian	3/5 stars
Tom Hull	B+
Pitchfork	9.2/10

Hammersmith Odeon, London '75 is a concert video and the fourth live album by Bruce Springsteen and the E Street Band, released in 2006. It is a full-length recording of their performance on November 18, 1975, at the Hammersmith Odeon in London during their Born to Run tours. It was first released as a DVD on November 14, 2005, as part of the Born to Run 30th Anniversary Edition package, and then several months later on February 28, 2006, released as an audio CD. The album was reissued on vinyl for the first time for Record Store Day on April 22, 2017.

== Background ==
The concert was part of Columbia Records' push to promote Springsteen in the UK and Europe following the success of his third album, Born to Run (1975), in the US. The large amount of publicity accompanying these appearances, especially the one in London, famously caused Springsteen to pull down from the front of the Odeon a promotional poster proclaiming "Finally London is ready for Bruce Springsteen and The E Street Band."

This performance marked the European concert debut of Springsteen and the E Street Band, kicking off a four-date mini-tour which also featured shows in Stockholm, Sweden, and Amsterdam, the Netherlands, as well as a second concert at the Hammersmith Odeon on November 24 that was added due to the huge ticket demand for the first London gig.

In the liner notes, Springsteen himself writes that after the show had been recorded, "I'd paid no attention to it. I never looked at it ... for 30 years." In his autobiography, Born to Run, he reveals that during and after the concert he experienced an angst-ridden sense of doubt as to performing in general, and his performance that evening in particular. However, in the same book, he recognizes that "whatever happened, that first night at the Hammersmith Odeon became one of our 'legendary' performances", despite calling the return gig on November 24 at the end of the European tour "a blaze of a show" by comparison.

After The Rising Tour, Springsteen had an inkling to dig into film of the early part of his career, the vast majority of which remained "a blank spot," with little or nothing ever released. He found the film and the 24-track audio recordings. The two-and-a-half-hour concert film was spliced together from 32 reels of silent 16-mm footage, digitally restored frame by frame in a painstaking process that took editor Thom Zimny a full year to complete. Bob Clearmountain, a veteran of several Springsteen projects, mixed the audio for the CD and film.

Actor, writer, and Monty Python member Michael Palin was in attendance and devoted an entire diary entry to the concert and his first impression of Springsteen and the band. He notes that the hype by CBS Records was met with a certain skepticism by the ticket-buying public. He notes that the concert did not start until 45 minutes after the scheduled start time and that the PA system made it difficult for him to make out the lyrics, but Springsteen and the band "kept the evening alive – and he did three encores." Contemporary and later reports seem to agree with Springsteen that the first performance on November 18 was in fact the inferior one, and was outshone by the repeat concert at the same venue on November 24 at the end of the European shows. This view may seem to have been borne out by the respective number of encores; three on November 18 and nine on November 24.

The album debuted on the Billboard 200 album chart on March 18, 2006, at number 93 with sales of approximately 12,000 copies sold. It spent two weeks on the chart. Hammersmith Odeon '75, with the exception of some songs on the Live/1975-85 box set, stands so far as the only full-length, official release that gives a snapshot of Springsteen and the E Street Band in concert at this early point in their musical career.

== Track listing ==
All songs by Bruce Springsteen, except where noted.

Disc one

1. "Thunder Road" – 5:51
2. "Tenth Avenue Freeze-Out" – 3:51
3. "Spirit in the Night" (Contains a portion of Lloyd Price's version of the traditional song "Stagger Lee", erroneously credited as "The Moon Was Yellow (And The Night Was Young)" by Fred Ahlert and Edgar Leslie) – 7:36
4. "Lost in the Flood" – 6:16
5. "She's the One" – 5:24
6. "Born to Run" – 4:17
7. "The E Street Shuffle/Havin' a Party" (Contains a portion of "Having a Party" by Sam Cooke) – 12:52
8. "It's Hard to Be a Saint in the City" – 5:28
9. "Backstreets" – 7:23

Disc two

1. "Kitty's Back" (Contains a portion of "Moondance" by Van Morrison) – 17:14
2. "Jungleland" – 9:35
3. "Rosalita (Come Out Tonight)" (Contains a portion of "Come a Little Bit Closer" by Tommy Boyce, Bobby Hart and Wes Ferrell and "Theme from Shaft" by Isaac Hayes) – 9:51
4. "4th of July, Asbury Park (Sandy)" – 7:03
5. "Detroit Medley" (Consists of: "Devil with a Blue Dress On" by William Stevenson and Frederick "Shorty" Long, "Good Golly, Miss Molly" by Robert Blackwell and John Marascalco as performed by Mitch Ryder & The Detroit Wheels, "See See Rider" by Gertrude "Ma" Rainey and Lena Arant, and "Jenny Take a Ride" by Bob Crewe, Enotris Johnson and Richard Penniman) – 7:02
6. "For You" – 8:26
7. "Quarter to Three" (Originally Recorded by Gary U.S. Bonds) – 6:44

Note

- The DVD plays "So Young and In Love" over the credits, a song from his album Tracks.

== Personnel ==
- Bruce Springsteen – guitar, vocals, harmonica, piano on "For You"
- Roy Bittan – piano, backing vocals
- Clarence Clemons – tenor, baritone and soprano saxophones, percussion, backing vocals
- Danny Federici – keyboards
- Garry Tallent – bass guitar, tambourine on opening of "She's the One"
- Steven Van Zandt – guitar, slide guitar, backing vocals
- Max Weinberg – drums

== Charts ==
Weekly chart performance for Hammersmith Odeon London '75
Chart (2006)	Peak
Austrian Albums (Ö3 Austria)	71
Dutch Albums (Album Top 100)	50
German Albums (Offizielle Top 100)	74
Italian Albums (FIMI)	37
Norwegian Albums (VG-lista)	9
Scottish Albums (OCC)	33
Swedish Albums (Sverigetopplistan)	42
UK Albums (OCC)	33
US Billboard 200	93
Chart (2017)	Peak
Irish Albums (OCC)	43
