= The Agora, Cleveland 1978 =

Live album by Bruce Springsteen & the E Street Band
- Released: December 23, 2014
- Recorded: August 9, 1978
- Venues: Agora Ballroom, Cleveland, Ohio
- Genre: Rock
- Length: 2:54:10

Bruce Springsteen & the E Street Band chronology
Apollo Theater 3/09/12 (2014)	The Agora, Cleveland 1978 (2014)	Tower Theater, Philadelphia 1975 (2015)

The Agora, Cleveland 1978 is a live album by Bruce Springsteen & the E Street Band, released in December 2014 and was the second official release through the Bruce Springsteen Archives.

Recorded at the Agora Ballroom in Cleveland, Ohio on August 9, 1978, during the band's Darkness Tour, the show is considered by many fans and critics to be one of the most essential live recordings by Springsteen and the E Street Band. Rolling Stone said of the recording "This is simply the greatest live LP this greatest of live rockers has ever officially released."

The show was originally broadcast live on the radio with bootlegs circulating for years but this marks the first official release of the album, completely restored and remastered.

== Background ==
The concert was sponsored by radio station WMMS as part of their 10th anniversary. WMMS announced the concert on air just 12 days before the show and free tickets were sent to listeners who dropped off a self-addressed stamped envelope at a local record store chain. Two tickets each were sent to 375 fans chosen at random from the thousands of requests that were received.

The concert was broadcast live on WMMS and seven other Midwestern radio stations. The audio mix and recording were supervised by Springsteen's manager Jon Landau and audio engineer Jimmy Iovine.

Engineer Toby Scott, who remastered the 2014 release, found tapes of the concert at the Rock and Roll Hall of Fame in Cleveland where they were part of the Springsteen exhibit "Asbury Park to the Promised Land." Comparing the tapes to other copies of the concert, Scott thought this was the best version and potentially the original master tapes. The exact source of the tapes is unclear as there were two audio feeds—one to Agency Recording studio, located on the second floor of the Agora building, and another to a production truck parked outside. The club's owner, Hank LoConti, had donated the Agora's 16-track master reels to the Western Reserve Historical Society in 2000.

== Track listing ==
All tracks by Bruce Springsteen, except where noted.

=== Set one ===
1. "Summertime Blues" – 3:20 (Eddie Cochran, Jerry Capehart)
2. "Badlands" – 4:46
3. "Spirit in the Night" – 8:04
4. "Darkness on the Edge of Town" – 5:36
5. "Factory" – 3:22
6. "The Promised Land" – 6:00
7. "Prove It All Night" – 11:49
8. "Racing in the Street" – 8:58
9. "Thunder Road" – 6:44
10. "Jungleland" – 10:18

=== Set two ===
1. "Paradise By the "C"" – 4:04
2. "Fire" – 3:06
3. "Sherry Darling" – 6:12
4. "Not Fade Away/Gloria/She's the One" – 14:53 (Buddy Holly, Norman Petty/Van Morrison/Springsteen)
5. "Growin' Up" – 13:02
6. "Backstreets" – 14:02
7. "Rosalita (Come Out Tonight)" – 12:51

=== First encore ===
1. "4th of July, Asbury Park (Sandy)" – 8:44
2. "Born to Run" – 6:09
3. "Because the Night" – 8:12
4. "Raise Your Hand" – 6:37 (Steve Cropper, Eddie Floyd, Al Bell)

=== Second encore ===
1. "Twist and Shout" – 7:24 (Phil Medley, Bert Berns)

== Personnel ==
- Bruce Springsteen – lead vocals, guitar, harmonica
- Roy Bittan – piano, background vocals
- Clarence Clemons – saxophone, percussion, background vocals, clarinet
- Danny Federici – organ, electronic glockenspiel, accordion
- Garry Tallent – bass guitar
- Steven Van Zandt – guitar, background vocals
- Max Weinberg – drums
- Plangent Processes – Archival analog to digital transfer
