= Nassau Coliseum, New York 1980 =

Live album by Bruce Springsteen and the E Street Band
- Released: March 25, 2015
- Recorded: December 31, 1980 – January 1, 1981
- Genre: Rock
- Length: 3:47:40
- Label: http://live.brucespringsteen.net
- Producer: Toby Scott, David Bianco, Jim Scott

Bruce Springsteen and the E Street Band chronology
The Agora, Cleveland 1978 (2015)	Nassau Coliseum, New York 1980 (2015)	Brendan Byrne Arena, New Jersey 1984 (2015)

Nassau Coliseum, New York 1980 is a live album by Bruce Springsteen and the E Street Band, released in March 2015, and was the fourth official release through the Bruce Springsteen Archives. The show was originally recorded live at the Nassau Coliseum in Uniondale, New York, on December 31, 1980.

On July 5, 2019, a remixed and upgraded version of the recording was released, concurrent with the release of the concert at the same venue two nights prior.

== Background ==
The concert, performed on New Year's Eve 1980 and New Year's Day 1981, is known for clocking in at almost four hours of music with 38 songs. The recording marks the first live release from the River Tour. Several selections from the show were included in various releases over the years; "4th of July, Asbury Park (Sandy)" previously appeared on the 1986 Live/1975–85 box set, and "Merry Christmas Baby" was released as the B-side to its first single, "War." Additionally, the non-album track "Rendezvous" was later released on the outtake set Tracks in 1998.

== Track listing ==
All tracks by Bruce Springsteen, except where noted.

=== Set one ===
1. "Night" – 3:25
2. "Prove It All Night" – 5:57
3. "Spirit in the Night" – 7:42
4. "Darkness on the Edge of Town" – 4:48
5. "Independence Day" – 5:30
6. "Who'll Stop the Rain – 5:56 (Fogerty)
  - Originally recorded by Creedence Clearwater Revival
7. "This Land is Your Land" – 3:19 (Guthrie)
  - Originally recorded by Woody Guthrie
8. "The Promised Land" – 5:55
9. "Out in the Street" – 5:25
10. "Racing in the Street" – 8:22
11. "The River" – 6:56
12. "Badlands" – 5:41
13. "Thunder Road" – 7:05

=== Set two ===
1. "Cadillac Ranch" – 5:02
2. "Sherry Darling" – 5:15
3. "Hungry Heart" – 4:45
4. "Merry Christmas, Baby – 4:50 (Baxter/Moore)
  - Originally recorded by Johnny Moore's Three Blazers
5. "Fire" – 4:32
6. "Candy's Room" – 3:23
7. "Because the Night" – 8:38
8. "4th of July, Asbury Park (Sandy)" – 6:47
9. "Rendezvous" – 3:27
10. "Fade Away" – 9:23
11. "The Price You Pay" – 6:37
12. "Wreck on the Highway" – 5:36
13. "Two Hearts" – 2:50
14. "Ramrod" – 4:39
15. "You Can Look (But You Better Not Touch)" – 4:39
16. "Held Up Without a Gun" – 1:42
17. "In the Midnight Hour" – 2:55
  - Originally recorded by Wilson Pickett
18. "Auld Lang Syne – 2:03 (Burns)
  - Poem originally written by Robert Burns
19. "Rosalita (Come Out Tonight)" – 16:19

=== Encore ===
1. "Santa Claus Is Coming to Town – 5:23 (Coots/Gillespie)
  - Originally recorded by Harry Reser Orchestra
2. "Jungleland" – 12:23
3. "Born to Run" – 4:38
4. "Detroit Medley" – 13:07
  - "Devil With a Blue Dress On" (Stevenson/Long) Originally recorded by Mitch Ryder and the Detroit Wheels
  - "See See Rider" (Rainey/Lena Arant) Originally recorded by Ma Rainey
  - "Good Golly Miss Molly" (Blackwell/Marascalco) Originally recorded by Little Richard
  - "Jenny Take a Ride" (Crewe/Johnson/Penniman) Originally recorded by Mitch Ryder and the Detroit Wheels
5. "Twist and Shout" – 8:00 Phil Medley and Bert Berns
  - Originally recorded by the Isley Brothers
6. "Raise Your Hand – 4:44 (Cropper/Floyd/Isbell)
  - Originally recorded by Eddie Floyd

== Personnel ==
- Bruce Springsteen – lead vocals, guitars, harmonica
- Roy Bittan – piano, background vocals
- Clarence Clemons – saxophone, percussion, background vocals
- Danny Federici – organ, electronic glockenspiel, background vocals
- Garry Tallent – bass guitar
- Steven Van Zandt – guitars, background vocals
- Max Weinberg – drums
