= Bruce Springsteen and the E Street Band Reunion Tour =

1999–2000 concert tour by Bruce Springsteen and the E Street Band

- Tour by Bruce Springsteen and the E Street Band
- Start date: April 9, 1999
- End date: July 1, 2000
- Legs: 3
- No. of shows: 132

Bruce Springsteen and the E Street Band concert chronology
- Ghost of Tom Joad Tour (1995–1997); Reunion Tour (1999–2000); The Rising Tour (2002–2003)

The Bruce Springsteen and the E Street Band Reunion Tour was a lengthy, top-grossing concert tour featuring Bruce Springsteen and the E Street Band that took place over 1999 and 2000.

The tour was the first set of regular concerts given by Springsteen and the E Street Band in eleven years, since the 1988 Tunnel of Love Express and Human Rights Now! Tours, and followed two lengthy tours by Springsteen without the Band in the intervening years.

The tour was not intended to promote any Springsteen records; the release of the box set Tracks six months earlier had been oriented towards the holiday shopping market, and no longer held any chart action by the time of the tour. The release of the cut-down, single disc 18 Tracks did coincide with the start of the tour but received little publicity or sales.

== Itinerary ==
Tour preparations began in March 1999 with a series of rehearsals at Asbury Park, New Jersey's Convention Hall. Several dozen Springsteen fans, eager with anticipation at what the long-awaited reunion might bring, stood outside the Hall on the cold and windy boardwalk and beach, hearing what they could from inside the walls and reporting their findings on several Springsteen Internet forums. It was during one of these sessions that fans first heard runthroughs of "The Train Song", which would become the tour's closing epic "Land of Hope and Dreams". The practice of listening in on rehearsals would continue for all of Springsteen's subsequent tours. Springsteen then held two public rehearsal concerts in Convention Hall, a practice that would also continue for tours to come.

Springsteen opted to start the Reunion Tour in Europe. The first leg of the tour formally began on April 9, 1999, with the first of two nights in Barcelona's Palau Sant Jordi. By then, Barcelona had become one of the strongest centers of Springsteen popularity, and additionally there were hundreds of travelling fans in attendance. The European leg would run through the end of June, finishing in Oslo, and encompass 36 shows in all, featuring a mixture of arenas and stadiums and often playing two nights in a location.

Two weeks later, the second leg commenced in the United States, and took place solely in arenas. It began with 15 consecutive shows in East Rutherford, New Jersey's Continental Airlines Arena. More multi-night stands followed, as the tour concentrated on Springsteen hot spots such as Philadelphia, Boston, Chicago, and Los Angeles. After 52 shows, the leg finished in Minneapolis at the end of November.

A three-month winter break ensued. The third leg began in late February 2000 with a show at Pennsylvania State University. This leg focused on mostly single-night stands in areas that hadn't been reached on the previous leg, including a couple of dates in Canada, and again took place in arenas. Totalling 44 shows, it concluded in June with 10 consecutive dates at New York City's Madison Square Garden, ending on July 1, 2000.

In all, the tour played 132 shows in 62 cities over a span of 15 months.

== Tour dates ==
Date	City	Country	Venue	Attendance	Revenue
Europe
April 9, 1999	Barcelona	Spain	Palau Sant Jordi	—N/a	—N/a
April 11, 1999	Barcelona	Spain	Palau Sant Jordi	—N/a	—N/a
April 13, 1999	Munich	Germany	Olympiahalle	—N/a	—N/a
April 15, 1999	Cologne	Germany	Kölnarena	—N/a	—N/a
April 17, 1999	Bologna	Italy	Palasport	11,700 / 11,700	$438,366
April 19, 1999	Milan	Italy	Fila Forum	22,800 / 22,800	$828,340
April 20, 1999	Milan	Italy	Fila Forum	22,800 / 22,800	$828,340
April 23, 1999	Regensburg	Germany	Donau Arena	—N/a	—N/a
April 24, 1999	Vienna	Austria	Wiener Stadthalle	—N/a	—N/a
April 26, 1999	Zürich	Switzerland	Hallenstadion	—N/a	—N/a
April 28, 1999	Lyon	France	Halle Tony Garnier	—N/a	—N/a
May 1, 1999	Manchester	England	Manchester Evening News Arena	—N/a	—N/a
May 2, 1999	Manchester	England	Manchester Evening News Arena	—N/a	—N/a
May 16, 1999	Birmingham	England	NEC Arena	—N/a	—N/a
May 18, 1999	London	England	Earls Court Exhibition Centre	—N/a	—N/a
May 19, 1999	London	England	Earls Court Exhibition Centre	—N/a	—N/a
May 21, 1999	London	England	Earls Court Exhibition Centre	—N/a	—N/a
May 23, 1999	London	England	Earls Court Exhibition Centre	—N/a	—N/a
May 25, 1999	Dublin	Ireland	RDS Arena	40,000 / 40,000	—N/a
May 27, 1999	Ghent	Belgium	Flanders Expo	—N/a	—N/a
May 29, 1999	Berlin	Germany	Parkbühne Wuhlheide	—N/a	—N/a
May 30, 1999	Berlin	Germany	Parkbühne Wuhlheide	—N/a	—N/a
June 2, 1999	Paris	France	Palais Omnisports de Paris-Bercy	—N/a	—N/a
June 3, 1999	Paris	France	Palais Omnisports de Paris-Bercy	—N/a	—N/a
June 5, 1999	Zaragoza	Spain	La Romareda	—N/a	—N/a
June 7, 1999	Madrid	Spain	Estadio La Peineta	—N/a	—N/a
June 11, 1999	Genoa	Italy	Stadio Luigi Ferraris	25,261 / 29,000	$1,031,866
June 13, 1999	Leipzig	Germany	Bruno-Plache-Stadion	—N/a	—N/a
June 15, 1999	Offenbach	Germany	Stadion am Bieberer Berg	—N/a	—N/a
June 17, 1999	Bremen	Germany	Weserstadion	—N/a	—N/a
June 19, 1999	Arnhem	Netherlands	GelreDome	—N/a	—N/a
June 20, 1999	Arnhem	Netherlands	GelreDome	—N/a	—N/a
June 23, 1999	Stockholm	Sweden	Stockholm Olympic Stadium	66,000 / 66,000	—N/a
June 24, 1999	Stockholm	Sweden	Stockholm Olympic Stadium	66,000 / 66,000	—N/a
June 26, 1999	Copenhagen	Denmark	Parken Stadium	48,000 / 48,000	—N/a
June 27, 1999	Oslo	Norway	Valle Hovin	—N/a	—N/a
North America
July 15, 1999	East Rutherford	United States	Continental Airlines Arena	304,785 / 304,785	$19,000,605
July 18, 1999	East Rutherford	United States	Continental Airlines Arena	304,785 / 304,785	$19,000,605
July 20, 1999	East Rutherford	United States	Continental Airlines Arena	304,785 / 304,785	$19,000,605
July 24, 1999	East Rutherford	United States	Continental Airlines Arena	304,785 / 304,785	$19,000,605
July 26, 1999	East Rutherford	United States	Continental Airlines Arena	304,785 / 304,785	$19,000,605
July 27, 1999	East Rutherford	United States	Continental Airlines Arena	304,785 / 304,785	$19,000,605
July 29, 1999	East Rutherford	United States	Continental Airlines Arena	304,785 / 304,785	$19,000,605
August 1, 1999	East Rutherford	United States	Continental Airlines Arena	304,785 / 304,785	$19,000,605
August 2, 1999	East Rutherford	United States	Continental Airlines Arena	304,785 / 304,785	$19,000,605
August 4, 1999	East Rutherford	United States	Continental Airlines Arena	304,785 / 304,785	$19,000,605
August 6, 1999	East Rutherford	United States	Continental Airlines Arena	304,785 / 304,785	$19,000,605
August 7, 1999	East Rutherford	United States	Continental Airlines Arena	304,785 / 304,785	$19,000,605
August 9, 1999	East Rutherford	United States	Continental Airlines Arena	304,785 / 304,785	$19,000,605
August 11, 1999	East Rutherford	United States	Continental Airlines Arena	304,785 / 304,785	$19,000,605
August 12, 1999	East Rutherford	United States	Continental Airlines Arena	304,785 / 304,785	$19,000,605
August 21, 1999	Boston	United States	FleetCenter	98,894 / 98,894	$5,469,060
August 22, 1999	Boston	United States	FleetCenter	98,894 / 98,894	$5,469,060
August 24, 1999	Boston	United States	FleetCenter	98,894 / 98,894	$5,469,060
August 26, 1999	Boston	United States	FleetCenter	98,894 / 98,894	$5,469,060
August 27, 1999	Boston	United States	FleetCenter	98,894 / 98,894	$5,469,060
August 31, 1999	Washington, D.C.	United States	MCI Center	55,650 / 55,650	$3,575,423
September 1, 1999	Washington, D.C.	United States	MCI Center	55,650 / 55,650	$3,575,423
September 3, 1999	Washington, D.C.	United States	MCI Center	55,650 / 55,650	$3,575,423
September 8, 1999 (Note: The concerts on September 8 and 9, 1999 in Auburn Hills were originally scheduled on August 16 and 17, 1999, respectively.)	Auburn Hills	United States	The Palace of Auburn Hills	39,547 / 39,547	$2,477,370
September 9, 1999	Auburn Hills	United States	The Palace of Auburn Hills	39,547 / 39,547	$2,477,370
September 13, 1999	Philadelphia	United States	First Union Center	114,922 / 114,922	$7,394,085
September 15, 1999	Philadelphia	United States	First Union Center	114,922 / 114,922	$7,394,085
September 20, 1999	Philadelphia	United States	First Union Center	114,922 / 114,922	$7,394,085
September 21, 1999	Philadelphia	United States	First Union Center	114,922 / 114,922	$7,394,085
September 24, 1999 (Note: The concert on September 24, 1999, in Philadelphia was originally scheduled on September 16, 1999, before being postponed due to heavy rains caused by a hurricane.)	Philadelphia	United States	First Union Spectrum	114,922 / 114,922	$7,394,085
September 25, 1999	Philadelphia	United States	First Union Center	114,922 / 114,922	$7,394,085
September 27, 1999	Chicago	United States	United Center	57,833 / 57,833	$3,779,768
September 28, 1999	Chicago	United States	United Center	57,833 / 57,833	$3,779,768
September 30, 1999	Chicago	United States	United Center	57,833 / 57,833	$3,779,768
October 15, 1999	Phoenix	United States	America West Arena	16,978 / 16,978	$1,078,575
October 17, 1999	Los Angeles	United States	Staples Center	—N/a	—N/a
October 18, 1999	Los Angeles	United States	Staples Center	—N/a	—N/a
October 21, 1999	Los Angeles	United States	Staples Center	—N/a	—N/a
October 23, 1999	Los Angeles	United States	Staples Center	—N/a	—N/a
October 25, 1999	Oakland	United States	The Arena in Oakland	47,074 / 47,074	$3,112,423
October 26, 1999	Oakland	United States	The Arena in Oakland	47,074 / 47,074	$3,112,423
October 28, 1999	Oakland	United States	The Arena in Oakland	47,074 / 47,074	$3,112,423
November 6, 1999	Fargo	United States	Fargodome	17,245 / 20,000	—N/a
November 9, 1999	Milwaukee	United States	Bradley Center	—N/a	—N/a
November 10, 1999	Indianapolis	United States	Conseco Fieldhouse	—N/a	—N/a
November 14, 1999	Cleveland	United States	Gund Arena	40,419 / 40,419	$2,549,123
November 15, 1999	Cleveland	United States	Gund Arena	40,419 / 40,419	$2,549,123
November 17, 1999	Columbus	United States	Value City Arena	17,869 / 17,869	$1,142,738
November 19, 1999	Buffalo	United States	Marine Midland Arena	19,294 / 19,294	$1,179,765
November 21, 1999	Albany	United States	Pepsi Arena	16,612 / 16,612	$1,030,851
November 28, 1999 (Note: The concerts on November 28 and 29, 1999, in Minneapolis were originally scheduled on November 3 and 4, 1999, respectively, before being postponed due to Patti Scialfa's perforated eardrum.)	Minneapolis	United States	Target Center	32,537 / 32,537	$2,071,876
November 29, 1999	Minneapolis	United States	Target Center	32,537 / 32,537	$2,071,876
North America
February 28, 2000	University Park	United States	Bryce Jordan Center	15,439 / 15,439	$1,015,163
March 4, 2000	Orlando	United States	Orlando Arena	16,479 / 16,479	$870,412
March 6, 2000	Tampa	United States	Ice Palace	18,711 / 19,452	$1,112,428
March 9, 2000	Sunrise	United States	National Car Rental Center	34,148 / 38,194	$2,057,142
March 10, 2000	Sunrise	United States	National Car Rental Center	34,148 / 38,194	$2,057,142
March 13, 2000	Dallas	United States	Reunion Arena	15,967 / 16,025	$1,026,638
March 14, 2000	North Little Rock	United States	Alltel Arena	—N/a	—N/a
March 18, 2000	Memphis	United States	Pyramid Arena	—N/a	—N/a
March 19, 2000	New Orleans	United States	New Orleans Arena	13,515 / 17,033	$857,875
March 30, 2000	Denver	United States	Pepsi Center	—N/a	—N/a
March 31, 2000	Denver	United States	Pepsi Center	—N/a	—N/a
April 3, 2000	Portland	United States	Rose Garden	18,254 / 18,254	$1,184,865
April 4, 2000	Tacoma	United States	Tacoma Dome	22,415 / 22,415	$1,472,723
April 8, 2000	St. Louis	United States	Kiel Center	—N/a	—N/a
April 9, 2000	Kansas City	United States	Kemper Arena	—N/a	—N/a
April 12, 2000	Nashville	United States	Nashville Arena	—N/a	—N/a
April 15, 2000	Louisville	United States	Freedom Hall	—N/a	—N/a
April 17, 2000	Austin	United States	Frank Erwin Center	—N/a	—N/a
April 18, 2000	Houston	United States	Compaq Center	15,690 / 16,228	$985,422
April 21, 2000	Charlotte	United States	Charlotte Coliseum	23,624 / 23,624	$1,516,815
April 22, 2000	Raleigh	United States	RBC Center	18,872 / 18,872	$1,208,025
April 25, 2000	Pittsburgh	United States	Mellon Arena	—N/a	—N/a
April 26, 2000	Pittsburgh	United States	Mellon Arena	—N/a	—N/a
April 30, 2000	Cincinnati	United States	Firstar Center	—N/a	—N/a
May 3, 2000	Toronto	Canada	Air Canada Centre	38,268 / 38,268	$2,039,728
May 4, 2000	Toronto	Canada	Air Canada Centre	38,268 / 38,268	$2,039,728
May 7, 2000	Hartford	United States	Hartford Civic Center	—N/a	—N/a
May 8, 2000	Hartford	United States	Hartford Civic Center	—N/a	—N/a
May 21, 2000	Anaheim	United States	Arrowhead Pond of Anaheim	31,527 / 31,527	$2,001,143
May 22, 2000	Anaheim	United States	Arrowhead Pond of Anaheim	31,527 / 31,527	$2,001,143
May 27, 2000	Las Vegas	United States	MGM Grand Garden Arena	—N/a	—N/a
May 29, 2000	Salt Lake City	United States	Delta Center	—N/a	—N/a
June 3, 2000	Atlanta	United States	Philips Arena	36,122 / 36,122	$2,204,866
June 4, 2000	Atlanta	United States	Philips Arena	36,122 / 36,122	$2,204,866
June 12, 2000	New York City	United States	Madison Square Garden	190,530 / 190,530	$12,217,343
June 15, 2000	New York City	United States	Madison Square Garden	190,530 / 190,530	$12,217,343
June 17, 2000	New York City	United States	Madison Square Garden	190,530 / 190,530	$12,217,343
June 20, 2000	New York City	United States	Madison Square Garden	190,530 / 190,530	$12,217,343
June 22, 2000	New York City	United States	Madison Square Garden	190,530 / 190,530	$12,217,343
June 23, 2000	New York City	United States	Madison Square Garden	190,530 / 190,530	$12,217,343
June 26, 2000	New York City	United States	Madison Square Garden	190,530 / 190,530	$12,217,343
June 27, 2000	New York City	United States	Madison Square Garden	190,530 / 190,530	$12,217,343
June 29, 2000	New York City	United States	Madison Square Garden	190,530 / 190,530	$12,217,343
July 1, 2000	New York City	United States	Madison Square Garden	190,530 / 190,530	$12,217,343

== The show ==
The E Street Band's sound changed with this tour. Originally different because of its inclusion of two keyboard instruments and a saxophone, it was now more guitar-oriented, as different-era second guitarists Steven Van Zandt and Nils Lofgren were both included in the line-up, and as wife Patti Scialfa's greater up-front visibility added a fourth guitar. The ability of the sound system to keep the instrumental mix clear varied from venue to venue and night to night.

Set lists were dynamic throughout the tour. For a while Tracks' "My Love Will Not Let You Down", a 1982 Born in the U.S.A. outtake, was the usual show opener. Although little known, "My Love" contained all the classic E Street Band elements, led by Danny Federici's trademark electronic glockenspiel sound. Later many other songs served the opener role as well, often equally unknown but less accessible ones that gave the audience pause at the start. The second slot, however, was usually given to "Prove It All Night" or "The Promised Land", 1970s classics that would pull the audience fully into the show, followed by "Two Hearts", emphasizing the bond between Springsteen and sidekick Van Zandt. Following those numbers, anything might appear.

Midway through the regular set, a fixed series of five songs always appeared: a loud, full-band "Youngstown", with a fiery guitar solo from Nils Lofgren; a loud, three-guitars-distorting "Murder Inc."; the reliably crowd-rousing anthem "Badlands"; a lengthy take on "Out in the Street" with plenty of Bruce stage antics; and a very elongated "Tenth Avenue Freeze-Out", which served as this tour's band intro song.

It was in "Tenth Avenue Freeze-Out" that the show's theme began to emerge. Springsteen used it to deliver one of his tall tales about the formation of the E Street Band, adopting a preacher persona to first sing sections of the Impressions' "It's All Right" and/or Al Green's "Take Me to the River", all the while describing a quasi-spiritual quest in the guise of band introductions: a journey to "the river of resurrection, where everyone can find salvation. But you can’t get there by yourself." The band were the people needed: Max Weinberg was introduced as star of Late Night with Conan O'Brien; Garry Tallent got to play the bass riff from "Fire"; Steven Van Zandt was introduced as star of The Sopranos tel-eee-vision show (to which Van Zandt responded with a bit of the theme from The Godfather on his guitar); Patti Scialfa got a build-up as "the first lady of love", after which she would play and sing a verse of her album's title song "Rumble Doll"; and Clarence Clemons would get the biggest build-up of all, leading to the part of "Tenth Avenue Freeze-Out" in which "the Big Man joins the band."

From there the show would drop back into a serious mode, usually featuring a soft band rendition of the gloomy "The Ghost of Tom Joad" followed by a 1970s epic of loss rotated amongst "Backstreets", "Jungleland", and "Racing in the Street".

But then the second piece of the theme came, with the set closer "Light of Day". Now Springsteen was the backwoods preacher again, stretching out the song and in the middle giving a long sermon on what kind of salvation he was offering. First would be some local-site-specific glorifying or taunting, and then he would intone in time to band beats:

I'm here tonight – I'm here tonight –

To re-educate ya
To re-suscitate ya
To re-generate ya
To re-confiscate ya
To re-combabulate ya
To re-indoctrinate ya
To re-sex-u-late ya
To re-dedicate ya
To re-liberate ya
With the power, and the glory
With the power, and the glory
With the promise
With the majesty!
With the mystery!!
WITH THE MINISTRY! OF ROCK AND ROLL!!!

Now unlike my competitors,
I cannot ... I shall not ... I will not
Promise you life everlasting.
But I can promise you –
LIFE, RIGHT NOW!

This "Ministry of Rock and Roll" litany became the (long) catchphrase of the tour, and t-shirts were printed up with these words on the back.

Encores began with fan favorites such as "Born to Run" and "Thunder Road"; Springsteen would make increased use of turning the house lights on during some such songs, to increase the communal feeling of the concert.

Lights went back down, as the next-to-last song of the show typically began the third part of the concert's theme. This was a rendering of "If I Should Fall Behind", originally recorded during the E Street Band's dissolved period, but now cast as a slowly played vow of togetherness: Springsteen, Van Zandt, Lofgren, Scialfa, and Clemons would each take turns singing a verse, promising to wait for each other. Last came "Land of Hope and Dreams", the one newly written song to be featured on most of the tour. Musically based in part around the Impressions' "People Get Ready" but set to a loud guitar churn with a sometimes-heard mandolin riff from Van Zandt, 'Lohad' (as it soon became known to fans) was lyrically a deliberate inversion of Woody Guthrie's "This Train Is Bound For Glory". In Preacher Bruce's take, all are welcome on the train – "saints and sinners", "losers and winners", "whores and gamblers" – you just get on board. Stretched to eight or more minutes, with several false endings, 'Lohad' represented the culmination of the show's message of rock and roll revival.

Springsteen celebrated his 50th birthday with a sold-out show on September 24, 1999, at Philadelphia's First Union Spectrum, opening the show with praise for his strong Philadelphia fan base, then playing a voicemail recording that a friend of his mother left on her answering machine, singing to him "The Big 50". Springsteen then quoted W. C. Fields, saying that "All things being equal, I'd rather be in Philadelphia", and broke into his early favorite "Growin' Up".

During the tour's third leg in 2000, Springsteen began performing some additional newly written songs, including a couple co-written by Joe Grushecky of Iron City Houserockers fame. But the new song that gained by far the most attention was "American Skin (41 Shots)".

Finally, the Garden shows and the tour concluded with the sole performance of the 1995 temporary-reunion "Blood Brothers", augmented by an added verse; in the words of writer Robert Santelli, this was "the only song that could sum up what he was feeling ... Tears flowed, onstage and off, and when it was all over, Bruce Springsteen and the E Street Band, had come full circle—blood brothers, one and all."

== Songs performed ==
Originals

Greetings from Asbury Park, New Jersey

- "Blinded by the Light"
- "Does This Bus Stop at 82nd Street?"
- "For You"
- "Growin' Up"
- "It's Hard to Be a Saint in the City"
- "Lost in the Flood"
- "Mary Queen of Arkansas"
- "Spirit in the Night"

The Wild, the Innocent & the E Street Shuffle

- "4th of July, Asbury Park (Sandy)"
- "The E Street Shuffle"
- "Incident on 57th Street"
- "New York City Serenade"
- "Rosalita (Come Out Tonight)"

Born to Run

- "Backstreets"
- "Born to Run"
- "Jungleland"
- "Meeting Across the River"
- "Night"
- "She's the One"
- "Tenth Avenue Freeze-Out"
- "Thunder Road"

Darkness on the Edge of Town

- "Adam Raised a Cain"
- "Badlands"
- "Candy's Room"
- "Darkness on the Edge of Town"
- "Factory"
- "The Promised Land"
- "Prove It All Night"
- "Racing in the Street"
- "Something in the Night"

The River

- "Cadillac Ranch"
- "Hungry Heart"
- "Independence Day"
- "Out in the Street"
- "Point Blank"
- "Ramrod"
- "The River"
- "Sherry Darling"
- "The Ties That Bind"
- "Two Hearts"
- "You Can Look (But You Better Not Touch)"

Nebraska

- "Atlantic City"
- "Mansion on the Hill"

Born in the U.S.A.

- "Bobby Jean"
- "Born in the U.S.A."
- "Dancing in the Dark"
- "Darlington County"
- "Downbound Train"
- "I'm on Fire"
- "My Hometown"
- "No Surrender"
- "Working on the Highway"

Tunnel of Love

- "Brilliant Disguise"
- "Tougher Than the Rest"

Human Touch

- "Human Touch"
- "Roll of the Dice"

Lucky Town

- "Better Days"
- "If I Should Fall Behind"
- "Lucky Town"

Greatest Hits

- "Blood Brothers"
- "Murder Incorporated"
- "Secret Garden"
- "Streets of Philadelphia"
- "This Hard Land"

The Ghost of Tom Joad

- "The Ghost of Tom Joad"
- "Sinaloa Cowboys"
- "Youngstown"

Tracks

- "Back in Your Arms"
- "Be True"
- "Brothers Under the Bridge"
- "Car Wash"
- "Dollhouse"
- "Don't Look Back
- "Frankie"
- "Give the Girl a Kiss"
- "I Wanna Be With You"
- "Janey, Don't You Lose Heart"
- "Lion's Den"
- "Loose Ends"
- "My Love Will Not Let You Down"
- "Rendezvous"
- "Roulette"
- "Stand on It"
- "Take 'Em As They Come"
- "Where the Bands Are"

18 Tracks

- "The Fever"
- "Trouble River"
- "The Promise"

Other (non-album songs)

- "American Skin (41 Shots)"
- "Because the Night"
- "Fire"
- "Further on (Up the Road)
- "In Freehold"
- "Land of Hope and Dreams"
- "Light of Day"
- "Red-Headed Woman"
- "Seeds"
- "Code of Silence"

Cover songs

- "Another Thin Line"
- "Can't Help Falling in Love"
- "Dancing in the Street"
- "Follow That Dream"
- "Gloria"
- "Idiot's Delight"
- "Raise Your Hand"
- "Santa Claus Is Coming to Town"
- "Soul Man"
- "Trapped"
- "Viva Las Vegas"
- "War"
- "Who'll Stop the Rain?"

== Critical and commercial reception ==
The Reunion Tour received generally good reviews.

Chris Willman of Entertainment Weekly stated that the tour "was as much traveling tent revival as reunion tour.... Springsteen drove it home with his nightly impersonation of a preacher during 'Tenth Avenue Freeze-Out', cheerfully bellowing about the soul-saving power of rock. Billy Sunday himself would be hard-pressed to invoke buzzwords like faith and believe as much as they turn up in an evening's worth of Springsteen lyrics. Houselights came up at full blast for minutes at a time, bathing the congregation in divine light and defying the conventional wisdom that rock is best enjoyed in the dark." Kevin O'Hare of Infoplease wrote, "the shows sometimes seemed like an oldies revue, due to the dearth of new material that they offered. Springsteen was still electrifying on stage, yet it almost seemed like he'd lost his desire as a songwriter." Sandy Carter of Z Magazine said that "As we come to the end of the 20th century, it's increasingly difficult to believe in the power of rock and roll to change lives. But with the current reunion tour of Bruce Springsteen and the E Street Band, the tradition rediscovers a glorious, life-affirming eloquence." Ed Kaz of the Asbury Park Press enjoyed Springsteen's hip-swivelling comment during the "Tenth Avenue Freeze-Out" rap that "I have the Ghost of Tom Jones inside of me!"

Springsteen himself was happy with the outcome of the tour: "We knew the band was gonna play well and that everybody's commitment was stronger than ever, and people were excited. Hey, it was exciting just to be onstage with those people again. It was a lot of fun standing next to Steve, you know, standing next to Clarence, and you realize that that thing alone was something that ... It had great meaning for our audience and, and for me, in my life."

Continental Airlines Arena hung a banner celebrating the 15 sold out Reunion Tour shows there in July and August 1999.

The second leg's starting stand of 15 consecutive shows at Continental Airlines Arena not only set a record for the Meadowlands Sports Complex, but also set an industry record for consecutive large arena shows. The shows were all legitimate sell-outs; the arena has a banner hanging from the rafters to commemorate this achievement, right next to the banners celebrating championships from the resident sports teams.

Sales were not equally strong in all areas of the country, however. The American South, always an area that Springsteen had less relative popularity in, was becoming even more difficult for him; poor sales were reported in the Little Rock, Arkansas, area , for example.

In fact, the show was pitched towards hard-core Springsteen fans. Lesser-known tracks and rarities abounded in the set lists; enough album oriented rock radio classics were included to keep knowledgeable rock fans content, but Springsteen's Top 40 pop hits from the 1980s and early 1990s were almost completely ignored, causing marked discontent outside arenas for attendees coming from that perspective. In other ways, too, the tour was a feast for "Bruce tramps". Internet forums and ticket exchange sites made travelling to multiple shows easier than ever. Tips were exchanged about how best to get "jailbait" seats, those in the first 17 rows of the arena floor for which a special bracelet was worn. In its traditional anti-scalping measure, Springsteen's management held tickets out for day-of-the-show "drop lines", for which ticketless fans organized waiting lines. Even better was the "Man in Black", a darkly dressed Springsteen representative who would walk the upper rafters before a show and upgrade some of the lucky faithful to front-row seats (and feed the exchanged nosebleeds out to the drop line). Indeed, some fans purposefully bought or sat in bad seats in hope of an MIB visit, though it seemed to help selection chances if someone young, attractive and female was in the party.

At the time the Reunion Tour completed in mid-2000, it was the highest-grossing concert tour in North America for the year up to that point.

== Broadcasts and recordings ==
The final two shows at Madison Square Garden became the source for Bruce Springsteen & the E Street Band: Live In New York City, which aired as an HBO television special on April 7, 2001, and subsequently was released in longer form as a DVD and then a CD. However, none of these forms presented a complete show, nor songs in their original concert order.

Several shows were released as part of the Bruce Springsteen Archives:

- Madison Square Garden, New York 07/01/2000 released on October 6, 2017
- Chicago September 30, 1999 released on September 7, 2018
- Los Angeles October 23, 1999 released on October 11, 2019
- First Union Center, Philadelphia September 25, 1999 released on July 3, 2020
- Madison Square Garden, New York 06/27/2000 released on March 12, 2021
- Arrowhead Pond, Anaheim 05/22/2000 released on January 7, 2022.
- East Rutherford, July 18, 1999 released on December 24, 2022
- Continental Airlines Arena East Rutherford, NJ, July 15, 1999 released on December 22, 2023
- Oakland Arena Oakland, CA, October 28, 1999 released on May 9, 2025
- Madison Square Garden, New York 06/22/2000 released on March 6, 2026

== Personnel ==
=== The E Street Band ===
- Bruce Springsteen – lead vocals, electric guitar (most lead guitar parts), acoustic guitar, harmonica, rare piano
- Roy Bittan – piano, synthesizer
- Clarence Clemons – saxophone, percussion, background vocals
- Danny Federici – organ, electronic glockenspiel, accordion
- Nils Lofgren – electric guitar (some lead guitar parts), acoustic guitar, pedal steel guitar, background vocals
- Patti Scialfa – acoustic guitar, background vocals, some featured duet vocals
- Garry Tallent – bass guitar, upright bass
- Steven Van Zandt – electric guitar (occasional lead guitar parts), mandolin, background vocals
- Max Weinberg – drums

Weinberg had to take several leaves of absence from his bandleading role on Late Night with Conan O'Brien, and the long break between the second and third legs was partly to accommodate him.

Van Zandt had to juggle his shooting schedule for his role on The Sopranos around the tour's dates; consequently, his character Silvio Dante's involvement in the series' second season was more limited than it would be other seasons.

== Sources ==
- Santelli, Robert. Greetings From E Street: The Story of Bruce Springsteen and the E Street Band. Chronicle Books, 2006. ISBN 0-8118-5348-9.
- Springsteen's official website has very little on the 1999–2000 period.
- Backstreets.com's 1999 first leg, second leg, and third leg set lists and show descriptions capture the contents and feel of each show; unfortunately, they are not structured as to allow direct linking to individual shows.
- Bruce Springsteen Killing Floor's database gives valuable coverage as well, and also supports direct linking to individual dates.
