= Born to Run tours =

1974–77 series of concert tours by Bruce Springsteen

- Tour by Bruce Springsteen
- Associated album: The Wild, the Innocent & the E Street Shuffle; Born to Run
- Start date: September 19, 1974
- End date: March 25, 1977
- Legs: 7
- No. of shows: 207 in North America; 3 in Europe; 210 in total

Bruce Springsteen concert chronology
- Born to Run tours (1974–77); Darkness Tour (1978–79)

The Born to Run tours were the unofficially-named concert tours surrounding the release of Bruce Springsteen's 1975 album Born to Run which occurred between 1974 and 1977. The album represented Springsteen's commercial breakthrough, and was marked by a grueling and meticulous recording process. To make ends meet Springsteen and the E Street Band toured constantly during the first set of recording sessions for it, performing his new songs as he developed them. Financial success was short-lived, however, as he was soon plunged into legal battles with his former manager Mike Appel and enjoined from further studio recording. Touring continued as a means of making a living, long after the conventional period of playing in connection with an album's release was over; only when his legal issues were finally resolved in 1977 did these tours conclude.

== Tours ==
=== Prelude ===
Throughout 1974, as in previous years, Springsteen toured extensively between recording sessions for Born to Run. He had written the title track early in the year, and is known to have been playing it in concert by May if not earlier. Early versions of album tracks "She's the One" (with parts of what would become "Backstreets") and "Jungleland" (without the Clarence Clemons' later-famous saxophone solo and with an extra section at the end) were beginning to appear in set lists. By the summer of that year, Springsteen's career fortunes had begun to turn; he played his last-ever gig as an opening act on August 3, becoming a headliner from then on. On August 14, he played his last show with David Sancious and Ernest "Boom" Carter in the band.

=== New Members Tour ===
On September 19 he played his first show, at The Main Point in Bryn Mawr, Pennsylvania, with Max Weinberg and Roy Bittan in the band; this also marked the point from which the band was explicitly billed as the E Street Band.

Violinist and stage foil Suki Lahav joined the band in early October. Shows were played up and down the East Coast to help integrate the new members' sound into the band as well as to provide some income while recording sessions dragged on — finances were often tight and manager Mike Appel often had to borrow money to pay the road crew. An advanced, slightly different mix of "Born to Run" was given to certain progressive rock radio stations throughout November; it made an immediate impression and stimulated interest in Springsteen's first two albums and his concerts. On February 5, 1975, another Main Point show was broadcast in its entirety by Philadelphia's WMMR; "Thunder Road" made its first, work-in-progress appearance under the title "Wings for Wheels", and the 2 hour 40 minute show overall is often regarded by fans as one of Springsteen's best ever. It was frequently bootlegged soon thereafter, beginning a pattern that would continue for much of Springsteen's career.

This tour came to a close on March 9, 1975 after two shows in Washington, D.C.'s Constitution Hall. It is thought that Steven Van Zandt appeared in both shows, but in any case these were the final appearances of Suki Lahav, who moved back to Israel soon thereafter.

=== Born to Run Tour ===
The Born to Run Tour proper began more than a month ahead of the album's release date, on July 20, 1975 at the Palace Theatre in Providence, Rhode Island. Van Zandt was now a full-fledged member of the band. "Tenth Avenue Freeze-Out" made its first appearance, but the shows were still dominated by older material. Playing mostly the Northeast, by early August "Backstreets" itself had appeared. Since Springsteen was a prolific songwriter at the time, numerous original songs were performed, many of which would not be released in any official capacity.

Beginning on August 13 was a key 5-night stand at New York City's The Bottom Line club. Columbia Records had put up posters of Springsteen around the city, the audience was heavy with press and music industry types, and an August 15 show was broadcast live by influential WNEW-FM. The shows were judged a success and further paved the way for Springsteen's big time emergence; many years later, Rolling Stone magazine would name the stand as one of the 50 Moments That Changed Rock and Roll. A similar four-night, six-show, stand was conducted beginning October 16 at The Roxy Theatre in West Hollywood, which was attended by Jack Nicholson, Warren Beatty, Cher, Ryan O'Neal, and Carole King, and various entertainment industry executives. By October 27 the publicity push had reached its climax and Springsteen was on the covers of both Time and Newsweek.

The tour ended with a New Year's Eve 1975 show at the Tower Theatre in Upper Darby Township, Pennsylvania, which was recorded on multitrack and released as a bootleg. The show includes a rare performance of "Night" and a ballad version of "Tenth Avenue Freeze-Out."

==== European Leg ====
In November 1975, Springsteen made his first tour of Western Europe; a brief visit performing only in London (twice), Stockholm, and Amsterdam. The opening night's performance was captured on video (later released on DVD as Hammersmith Odeon, London '75); before which Springsteen in a "nervous rage" reportedly tore down promotional posters bearing his image. Springsteen would not return to Europe for six years.

=== Chicken Scratch Tour ===
This colorfully named tour began on March 25, 1976; Born in the U.S.A. Tour guides of 1984-85 would state of that date, "The fabled 'Chicken Scratch Tour' begins, taking Springsteen and E Streeters on an extremely meandering route through the south, midwest, and northeast United States." The name was actually given by the band's road crew, due to many of the shows being in secondary markets in the South.

After the April 29 show in Memphis' Ellis Auditorium, Springsteen decided to catch a taxi to Graceland. Upon arrival he had noticed a light on in the house and proceeded to jump the gates and walk to the front door. Security intervened at which point Springsteen asked if Elvis Presley was home, but Presley was in fact in Lake Tahoe. The guards not having any idea who this visitor was, even after Springsteen tried to explain it to them and state that he had been on the covers of Time and Newsweek, politely escorted him to the street. Years later Springsteen would tell the story in concerts and reminisce about what he would have said to Presley had he answered the door.

Then, of this tour's end on May 28, 1976, the officially chronology stated: "Chicken Scratch Tour draws to a merciless conclusion with a show at the U.S. Naval Academy in Annapolis, Maryland, which features a rousing version of Frankie Ford's 'Sea Cruise'."

=== Interlude ===
This likely would have been the end of touring until a new album was out. However, during 1976 the relationship between Springsteen and his now former manager and producer, Mike Appel, had deteriorated, and during July Appel threatened action against Springsteen. Springsteen filed suit against Appel, and Appel countersued.

Meanwhile, in August Springsteen and the band played some local shows, mostly in Red Bank, New Jersey, with The Miami Horns on loan from Southside Johnny and the Asbury Jukes. Three new songs intended for the next album, Darkness on the Edge of Town were performed; "Something in the Night", "The Promise" and "Rendezvous" were debuted in live form. The first would make the album, the second remained unreleased until 1999, and the third became a modest hit for Greg Kihn. On September 15, the judge in the lawsuits case ruled that Springsteen was enjoined from any further recording with Columbia Records until Appel's suit was resolved; proceeds from Born to Run sales were also tied up in accounting disputes, leaving touring as Springsteen and the band's primary means of making income.

=== U.S. Tour a/k/a Lawsuit Tour ===
What the official Springsteen chronology called the U.S. Tour ran from September 26 through November 4, 1976, starting at the Arizona Veterans Memorial Coliseum in Phoenix and ending with a six-night stand at The Palladium in New York. This tour was also with a horn section, also billed as The Miami Horns, but different from the previous group and unrelated to the Asbury Jukes. Along the way Springsteen played his first headlining shows in an arena, The Spectrum in Philadelphia, but he used curtains to partition off part of the venue.

=== 1977 legs ===
The court cases carried on, with battles being fought over various procedural rulings. Since Springsteen could still not enter the studio, he went back on tour. This run began on February 7, 1977 at the Palace Theatre in Albany, New York, and continued for 33 shows in the U.S. and Canada.

By now Springsteen was disheartened, and before a February 15 show in Detroit, he for the first time in his life did not want to get up on stage. "At that moment, I could see how people get into drinking or into drugs, because the one thing you want at a time like that is to be distracted—in a big way", he later told writer Robert Hilburn. Nonetheless, he rebounded, and the tour concluded on March 25, 1977 at the Music Hall in Boston.

=== Postlude ===
Meanwhile, the lawsuits had moved toward their conclusion, and a final settlement was reached on May 28, 1977. Springsteen entered the studio three days later to begin recording sessions for Darkness on the Edge of Town. The Born to Run tours were finally over.

== The shows ==
It was during these tours that the Springsteen concert image took form. He had stopped wearing sunglasses on stage and was now more accessible. His baggy pants, T-shirt, worn leather jacket and sloppy headwear look was now offset by two frontline visual foils, as both saxophonist Clarence Clemons and guitarist Steven Van Zandt were stylishly dressed in suits and distinctive hats.

Musically, the E Street Band now had its fullest sound, with two keyboards and a saxophone augmenting two guitars and the usual bass and drums. Springsteen did not just play songs as they were on his records — they were often rearranged or extended with playful, poignant, or angrily spoken narratives. Oldies from the early to mid-1960s were often brought in to supplement Springsteen's own material; The Animals' "It's My Life" was one such example, slowed down to try to increase the song's tension factor and preceded by what would become a Springsteen concert staple, the long bitter story about how he and his father did not get along at all with respect to the course Springsteen's life took as a teenager.

Springsteen's performances were also frenetic, with him jumping into crowds and singing on tables during the shows held in clubs.

Material from Born to Run grew in importance as the tour went on, but even the newest material could be quickly recast. Most notably, "Thunder Road" was changed from the spirited, sweeping album version into a surprisingly quiet and pleading show opener, featuring Springsteen singing while standing still at the microphone stand, guitar slung behind him, with only Roy Bittan's piano and Danny Federici's electronic glockenspiel accompanying him. (Producer Jon Landau later said that the stark presentation was partly due to the full band having trouble playing the album's arrangement.) "Backstreets" was augmented with a guitar line far more prominent than on record, while "Night", one of the least visible tracks on the album, became a show opener for a spell as well.

As the later tours took place and Springsteen became frustrated with his legal situation, the shows became his only outlet. Horn sections were added, songs further arranged, and more oldies pulled out. Performances sometimes reached the three- or four-hour mark. New material such as the bitter "The Promise" would appear out of nowhere, then disappear again.

=== Songs performed ===
Originals

Greetings from Asbury Park, New Jersey

- "Blinded by the Light"
- "Does This Bus Stop at 82nd Street?"
- "For You"
- "Growin' Up"
- "It's Hard to Be a Saint in the City"
- "Lost in the Flood"
- "Spirit in the Night"

The Wild, the Innocent & the E Street Shuffle

- "4th of July, Asbury Park (Sandy)"
- "The E Street Shuffle"
- "Incident on 57th Street"
- "Kitty's Back"
- "New York City Serenade"
- "Rosalita (Come Out Tonight)"

Born to Run

- "Backstreets"
- "Born to Run"
- "Jungleland"
- "Meeting Across the River"
- "Night"
- "She's the One"
- "Tenth Avenue Freeze-Out"
- "Thunder Road"

Other

- "A Love So Fine"
- "A Night Like This"
- "Action in the Streets"
- "Don't Look Back"
- "The Fever"
- "Funk Song"
- "Frankie"
- "The Promise"
- "Rendezvous
- "Something in the Night"
- "Wings for Wheels"

Cover songs

- "A Fine, Fine Girl"
- "Ain't Too Proud to Beg"
- "Baby, I Love You"
- "Back in the U.S.A."
- "Be My Baby"
- "Be True to Your School"
- "Carol"
- "Come a Little Bit Closer"
- "Cupid"
- "Detroit Medley"
- "Gimmie That Wine"
- "Gloria"
- "Goin' Back"
- "Having a Party"
- "(Your Love Keeps Lifting Me) Higher and Higher"
- "I Want You"
- "It's Gonna Work Out Fine"
- "It's My Life"
- "Knock on Wood"
- "Land of a 1000 Dances"
- "Let the Four Winds Blow"
- "Little Latin Lupe Lu"
- "Little Queenie"
- "Mona"
- "Mountain of Love"
- "New Orleans"
- "Nothing's Too Good For My Baby"
- "Party Lights"
- "Pretty Flamingo"
- "Quarter to Three"
- "Raise Your Hand"
- "Santa Claus is Coming to Town"
- "Say Goodbye to Hollywood"
- "Sea Cruise"
- "Sha La La"
- "She's Sure the Girl I Love"
- "Shout"
- "Spanish Harlem"
- "Stagger Lee"
- "Theme From Shaft"
- "The She Kissed Me"
- "Twist and Shout"
- "Twisting the Night Away"
- "Up on the Roof"
- "Walking in the Rain"
- "We Gotta Get Out of This Place"
- "Wear My Ring Around Your Neck"
- "When You Walk in the Room"
- "You Can't Sit Down"
- "Yum Yum Yum (I Want Some)"

== Commercial and critical reaction ==
The high-profile August 1975 The Bottom Line shows won raves from music critics. Rolling Stone said that a star had been born and that "Springsteen is everything that has been claimed for him", while the E Street Band "may very well be the great American rock & roll band." The New York Times said that the shows "will rank among the great rock experiences of those lucky enough to get in." The Bottom Line co-owner Alan Pepper said that Springsteen "brought the house to a fever pitch again and again and again, and the band stayed with him all the way. It was absolutely amazing, and I mean that. In all my years in the music business, I have never seen anything like those performances."

Reaction was similar in other locations; Los Angeles Times writer Robert Hilburn later stated that "the Born to Run shows were hailed in city after city as among the finest ever in rock."

== Broadcasts and recordings ==
In addition to the aforementioned Main Point and The Bottom Line shows, the October 17, 1975 show at The Roxy in West Hollywood was broadcast live on KWST-FM. Springsteen also made some visits to radio stations during the tours in which interviews and performances were conducted.

The 1986 Live/1975–85 box set contained just one selection from any of the Born to Run tours, the "solo piano" (and electronic glockenspiel) "Thunder Road" taken from the following night's show at The Roxy. (The lack of further coverage of the tours was one reason for fans' dissatisfaction with the box set at the time; Springsteen management said the available recordings did not have good enough sound quality).

In 2005, as part of the Born to Run 30th Anniversary Edition re-release package, a full-length concert film was assembled of the notorious November 18, 1975 Hammersmith Odeon show in London and included as a DVD. This was subsequently also released as the CD Hammersmith Odeon London '75.

Several shows have been released as part of the Bruce Springsteen Archives:

- Tower Theater, Philadelphia 1975, released on February 10, 2015
- Palace Theatre, Albany 1977, released on August 4, 2017
- Auditorium Theatre, Rochester, NY 1977, released on August 4, 2017
- The Roxy 1975, released on December 7, 2018
- London 11/24/1975, released on December 4, 2020
- Greenvale, NY 1975, released on January 31, 2022
- Toronto 1975, released on January 27, 2025

== Personnel ==
- Bruce Springsteen – lead vocals, guitars, harmonica
- The E Street Band:
  - Roy Bittan – piano
  - Clarence Clemons – saxophone, percussion, background vocals
  - Danny Federici – organ, electronic glockenspiel, accordion
  - Suki Lahav – violin, background vocals (October 1974-March 1975)
  - Garry Tallent – bass guitar
  - Steven Van Zandt – guitars, background vocals (from July 1975)
  - Max Weinberg – drums
- Miami Horns #1: (August 1976)
  - Rick Gazda – (trumpet)
  - Eddie Manion – (baritone sax)
  - Carlo Novi – (tenor sax)
  - Tony Palligrossi – (trumpet)
- Miami Horns #2 : (September 1976 – March 1977)
  - John Binkley (trumpet)
  - Ed De Palma (saxophone),
  - Dennis Orlock (trombone)
  - Steve Paraczky (trumpet)

== Tour dates ==
Date	City	Country	Venue	Attendance	Revenue
North America
September 19, 1974 [a]	Philadelphia	United States	The Main Point		
September 20, 1974 [a]	Philadelphia	United States	Upper Darby Township		
September 21, 1974 [a]	Oneonta	United States	Hunt Union Ballroom		
September 22, 1974 [a]	Union	United States	Kean College of New Jersey		
October 4, 1974 [a]	New York City	United States	Avery Fisher Hall		
October 5, 1974 [a]	Reading	United States	Bollman Center		
October 6, 1974 [a]	Worcester	United States	Atwood Hall		
October 11, 1974 [a]	Washington	United States	Shady Grove Music Fair		
October 12, 1974 [a]	Princeton	United States	Alexander Hall		
October 18, 1974 [a]	Passaic	United States	Capitol Theatre		
October 19, 1974 [a]	Schenectady	United States	Memorial Chapel		
October 20, 1974 [a]	Harrisburg	United States	Dickinson College Dining Hall		
October 25, 1974 [a]	Claremont	United States	Spaulding Auditorium		
October 26, 1974 [a]	Springfield	United States	Julia Sanderson Theater		
October 29, 1974 [a]	Boston	United States	Boston Music Hall		
November 1, 1974 [a]	Upper Darby Township, Pennsylvania	United States	Tower Theater		
November 2, 1974 [a]	Upper Darby Township, Pennsylvania	United States	Tower Theater		
November 6, 1974 [a]	Austin	United States	Armadillo World Headquarters		
November 7, 1974 [a]	Austin	United States	Armadillo World Headquarters		
November 8, 1974 [a]	Corpus Christi	United States	Ritz Music Hall		
November 9, 1974 [a]	Houston	United States	Houston Music Hall		
November 15, 1974 [a]	Easton	United States	Kirby Field House		
November 16, 1974 [a]	Washington	United States	Leonard Gym		
November 17, 1974 [a]	Charlottesville	United States	Memorial Gymnasium		
November 21, 1974 [a]	Philadelphia	United States	Lincoln Hall Auditorium		
November 22, 1974 [a]	Philadelphia	United States	Hollinger Field House		
November 23, 1974 [a]	Boston	United States	Salem State College Auditorium		
November 29, 1974 [a]	Trenton	United States	Trenton War Memorial		
November 30, 1974 [a]	Trenton	United States	Trenton War Memorial		
December 6, 1974 [a]	New Brunswick	United States	State Theatre		
December 7, 1974 [a]	Rochester	United States	Geneva Theater		
December 8, 1974 [a]	Burlington	United States	Burlington Memorial Auditorium		
January 5, 1975 [a]	Asbury Park	United States	The Stone Pony		
January 12, 1975 [a]	Asbury Park	United States	The Stone Pony		
January 19, 1975 [a]	Asbury Park	United States	The Stone Pony		
February 5, 1975 [a]	Philadelphia	United States	The Main Point		
February 6, 1975 [a]	Philadelphia	United States	Widener Field House		
February 7, 1975 [a]	Philadelphia	United States	Widener Field House		
February 18, 1975 [a]	Cleveland	United States	John Carroll Gymnasium		
February 19, 1975 [a]	State College	United States	The Auditorium		
February 20, 1975 [a]	Pittsburgh	United States	Syria Mosque		
February 23, 1975 [a]	New York City	United States	Westbury Music Fair		
March 7, 1975 [a]	Baltimore	United States	Painters Mill Music Fair		
March 8, 1975 [a]	Washington	United States	DAR Constitution Hall		
March 9, 1975 [a]	Washington	United States	DAR Constitution Hall		
North America
July 20, 1975 [b]	Providence	United States	Palace Concert Theater		
July 22, 1975 [b]	Geneva	United States	Geneva Theater		
July 23, 1975 [b]	Lenox	United States	Music Inn		
July 25, 1975 [b]	Kutztown	United States	Keystone Hall		
July 26, 1975 [b]	Kutztown	United States	Keystone Hall		
July 28, 1975 [b]	Washington, D.C.	United States	Carter Barron Amphitheatre		
July 29, 1975 [b]	Washington, D.C.	United States	Carter Barron Amphitheatre		
July 30, 1975 [b]	Washington, D.C.	United States	Carter Barron Amphitheatre		
August 1, 1975 [b]	Richmond	United States	The Mosque		
August 2, 1975 [b]	Norfolk	United States	Chrysler Hall		
August 8, 1975 [b]	Akron	United States	Akron Civic Theatre		
August 9, 1975 [b]	Pittsburgh	United States	Syria Mosque		
August 10, 1975 [b]	Cleveland	United States	Allen Theatre		
August 13, 1975 [b]	New York City	United States	The Bottom Line		
August 14, 1975 [b]	New York City	United States	The Bottom Line		
August 15, 1975 [b]	New York City	United States	The Bottom Line		
August 16, 1975 [b]	New York City	United States	The Bottom Line		
August 17, 1975 [b]	New York City	United States	The Bottom Line		
August 21, 1975 [b]	Atlanta	United States	Electric Ballroom		
August 22, 1975 [b]	Atlanta	United States	Electric Ballroom		
August 23, 1975 [b]	Atlanta	United States	Electric Ballroom		
September 4, 1975 [b]	Bryn Mawr	United States	The Main Point		
September 6, 1975 [b]	New Orleans	United States	Theater for the Performing Arts		
September 7, 1975 [b]	New Orleans	United States	Ya Ya Lounge		
September 12, 1975 [b]	Austin	United States	Municipal Auditorium		
September 13, 1975 [b]	Houston	United States	Houston Music Hall		
September 14, 1975 [b]	Houston	United States	Houston Music Hall		
September 16, 1975 [b]	Dallas	United States	Dallas Convention Center Theatre		
September 17, 1975 [b]	Oklahoma City	United States	Civic Center Music Hall		
September 20, 1975 [b]	Grinnell	United States	Darby Gymnasium		
September 21, 1975 [b]	Minneapolis	United States	Guthrie Theater		
September 23, 1975 [b]	Ann Arbor	United States	Hill Auditorium		
September 25, 1975 [b]	Chicago	United States	Auditorium Theatre		
September 26, 1975 [b]	Iowa City	United States	Hancher Auditorium		
September 27, 1975 [b]	St. Louis	United States	Ambassador Theatre		
September 28, 1975 [b]	Kansas City	United States	Memorial Hall		
September 30, 1975 [b]	Omaha	United States	Civic Auditorium Music Hall		
October 2, 1975 [b]	Milwaukee	United States	Uptown Theater		
October 4, 1975 [b]	Detroit	United States	Michigan Palace Theater		
October 10, 1975 [b]	Red Bank	United States	Monmouth Arts Center		
October 16, 1975 [b]	West Hollywood	United States	Roxy Theatre		
October 17, 1975 [b]	West Hollywood	United States	Roxy Theatre		
October 18, 1975 [b]	West Hollywood	United States	Roxy Theatre		
October 19, 1975 [b]	West Hollywood	United States	Roxy Theatre		
October 23, 1975 [b]	New York City	United States	Gerde's Folk City		
October 25, 1975 [b]	Portland	United States	Paramount Theatre		
October 26, 1975 [b]	Seattle	United States	Paramount Theatre		
October 29, 1975 [b]	Sacramento	United States	Memorial Auditorium		
October 31, 1975 [b]	Oakland	United States	Paramount Theatre		
November 1, 1975 [b]	Santa Barbara	United States	Robertson Gymnasium		
November 3, 1975 [b]	Tempe	United States	Gammage Memorial Auditorium		
November 4, 1975 [b]	Tempe	United States	Gammage Memorial Auditorium		
November 6, 1975 [b]	Tempe	United States	Gammage Memorial Auditorium		
November 10, 1975 [b]	Tampa	United States	Jai Alai Fronton		
November 11, 1975 [b]	Miami	United States	Jai Alai Fronton		
Europe
November 18, 1975 [b]	London	England	Hammersmith Odeon		
November 21, 1975 [b]	Stockholm	Sweden	Konserthuset		
November 23, 1975 [b]	Amsterdam	Netherlands	RAI Congrescentrum Theater		
November 24, 1975 [b]	London	England	Hammersmith Odeon		
North America
December 2, 1975 [b]	Boston	United States	Boston Music Hall		
December 3, 1975 [b]	Boston	United States	Boston Music Hall		
December 5, 1975 [b]	Washington, D.C.	United States	McDonough Gymnasium		
December 6, 1975 [b]	Washington, D.C.	United States	McDonough Gymnasium		
December 7, 1975 [b]	Washington, D.C.	United States	McDonough Gymnasium		
December 10, 1975 [b]	Lewisburg	United States	Davis Gym		
December 11, 1975 [b]	South Orange	United States	Walsh Gymnasium		
December 12, 1975 [b]	Brookville	United States	C.W. Post Dome Auditorium		
December 16, 1975 [b]	Oswego	United States	Laker Hall		
December 17, 1975 [b]	Buffalo	United States	Kleinhans Music Hall		
December 19, 1975 [b]	Montreal	Canada	Théâtre Maisonneuve		
December 20, 1975 [b]	Ottawa	Canada	NAC Opera House		
December 21, 1975 [b]	Toronto	Canada	Seneca College Field House		
December 27, 1975 [b]	Upper Darby Township	United States	Tower Theater		
December 28, 1975 [b]	Upper Darby Township	United States	Tower Theater		
December 30, 1975 [b]	Upper Darby Township	United States	Tower Theater		
December 31, 1975 [b]	Upper Darby Township	United States	Tower Theater		
North America
March 25, 1976 [c]	Columbia	United States	Township Auditorium		
March 26, 1976 [c]	Atlanta	United States	Fox Theatre	4,000 / 4,000	$26,000
March 28, 1976 [c]	Durham	United States	Cameron Indoor Stadium		
March 29, 1976 [c]	Charlotte	United States	Ovens Auditorium		
April 1, 1976 [c]	Athens	United States	Memorial Auditorium		
April 2, 1976 [c]	Louisville	United States	Macauley's Theatre		
April 4, 1976 [c]	East Lansing	United States	MSU Auditorium		
April 5, 1976 [c]	Columbus	United States	Ohio Theatre		
April 7, 1976 [c]	Cleveland	United States	Allen Theatre		
April 8, 1976 [c]	Cleveland	United States	Allen Theatre		
April 9, 1976 [c]	Hamilton	United States	Cotterell Court		
April 10, 1976 [c]	Wallingford	United States	Paul Mellon Arts Center		
April 12, 1976 [c]	Johnstown	United States	Cambria County War Memorial Arena		
April 13, 1976 [c]	University Park	United States	Rec Hall		
April 15, 1976 [c]	Pittsburgh	United States	Syria Mosque		
April 16, 1976 [c]	Meadville	United States	Shafer Auditorium		
April 17, 1976 [c]	Rochester	United States	Strong Auditorium		
April 20, 1976 [c]	Johnson City	United States	Freedom Hall Civic Center		
April 21, 1976 [c]	Knoxville	United States	Knoxville Civic Auditorium		
April 22, 1976 [c]	Blacksburg	United States	Burruss Auditorium		
April 24, 1976 [c]	Boone	United States	Varsity Gymnasium		
April 26, 1976 [c]	Chattanooga	United States	Soldiers and Sailors Memorial Auditorium		
April 28, 1976 [c]	Nashville	United States	Grand Ole Opry House	2,900	$15,039
April 29, 1976 [c]	Memphis	United States	Ellis Auditorium		
April 30, 1976 [c]	Birmingham	United States	Boutwell Memorial Auditorium		
May 3, 1976 [c]	Little Rock	United States	Robinson Municipal Auditorium		
May 4, 1976 [c]	Jackson	United States	Mississippi Coliseum		
May 6, 1976 [c]	Shreveport	United States	Shreveport Municipal Memorial Auditorium		
May 8, 1976 [c]	Baton Rouge	United States	LSU Assembly Center		
May 9, 1976 [c]	Mobile	United States	Mobile Municipal Theater		
May 10, 1976 [c]	Mobile	United States	Mobile Municipal Theater		
May 11, 1976 [c]	Auburn	United States	Memorial Coliseum		
May 13, 1976 [c]	New Orleans	United States	Municipal Auditorium		
May 27, 1976 [c]	West Point	United States	Eisenhower Hall Auditorium		
May 28, 1976 [c]	Annapolis	United States	Halsey Field House		
North America
September 26, 1976 [d]	Phoenix	United States	Arizona Veterans Memorial Coliseum	6,062	$42,783
September 29, 1976 [d]	Santa Monica	United States	Santa Monica Civic Auditorium		
September 30, 1976 [d]	Santa Monica	United States	Santa Monica Civic Auditorium		
October 2, 1976 [d]	Oakland	United States	Paramount Theatre	2,902	$19,821
October 3, 1976 [d]	Santa Clara	United States	Toso Pavilion		
October 5, 1976 [d]	Santa Barbara	United States	Santa Barbara Bowl	3,013	$24,207
October 9, 1976 [d]	Notre Dame	United States	Athletic & Convocation Center		
October 10, 1976 [d]	Oxford	United States	Millett Hall		
October 12, 1976 [d]	New Brunswick	United States	College Avenue Gymnasium	3,000	$22,500
October 13, 1976 [d]	Union Township	United States	Wilkins Theatre		
October 16, 1976 [d]	Williamsburg	United States	William & Mary Hall		
October 17, 1976 [d]	Washington, D.C.	United States	McDonough Gymnasium		
October 18, 1976 [d]	Washington, D.C.	United States	McDonough Gymnasium		
October 25, 1976 [d]	Philadelphia	United States	The Spectrum		
October 27, 1976 [d]	Philadelphia	United States	The Spectrum		
October 25, 1976 [d]	Philadelphia	United States	The Spectrum		
October 27, 1976 [d]	Philadelphia	United States	The Spectrum		
October 28, 1976 [d]	New York City	United States	The Palladium		
October 29, 1976 [d]	New York City	United States	The Palladium		
October 30, 1976 [d]	New York City	United States	The Palladium		
November 2, 1976 [d]	New York City	United States	The Palladium		
November 3, 1976 [d]	New York City	United States	The Palladium		
November 4, 1976 [d]	New York City	United States	The Palladium		
North America
February 7, 1977 [e]	Albany	United States	Palace Theatre		
February 8, 1977 [e]	Rochester	United States	Rochester Auditorium Theatre		
February 9, 1977 [e]	Buffalo	United States	Kleinhans Music Hall		
February 10, 1977 [e]	Utica	United States	Utica Memorial Auditorium		
February 12, 1977 [e]	Ottawa	Canada	Ottawa Civic Centre		
February 13, 1977 [e]	Toronto	Canada	Maple Leaf Gardens		
February 15, 1977 [e]	Detroit	United States	Masonic Temple Theatre		
February 16, 1977 [e]	Columbus	United States	Veterans Memorial Auditorium		
February 17, 1977 [e]	Richfield Township	United States	Coliseum at Richfield		
February 19, 1977 [e]	Saint Paul	United States	Civic Center Theatre		
February 20, 1977 [e]	Madison	United States	Dane County Coliseum	5,000 / 5,000	$27,679
February 22, 1977 [e]	Milwaukee	United States	Milwaukee Auditorium	4,795	$33,250
February 23, 1977 [e]	Chicago	United States	Auditorium Theatre		
February 25, 1977 [e]	West Lafayette	United States	Elliott Hall of Music		
February 26, 1977 [e]	Indianapolis	United States	ICC Ballroom		
February 27, 1977 [e]	Cincinnati	United States	Riverfront Coliseum		
February 28, 1977 [e]	St. Louis	United States	Fox Theatre	4,433 / 4,433	$29,389
March 2, 1977 [e]	Atlanta	United States	Atlanta Civic Center	3,653	$26,588
March 4, 1977 [e]	Jacksonville	United States	Civic Auditorium		
March 5, 1977 [e]	Orlando	United States	Jai Alai Fronton		
March 6, 1977 [e]	Miami	United States	Miami Jai Alai Fronton		
March 10, 1977 [e]	Toledo	United States	Toledo Sports Arena		
March 11, 1977 [e]	Latrobe	United States	Saint Vincent College Gymnasium	3,200 / 3,200	$24,000
March 13, 1977 [e]	Towson	United States	Towson Center		
March 14, 1977 [e]	Poughkeepsie	United States	Mid-Hudson Civic Center		
March 15, 1977 [e]	Binghamton	United States	Broome County Veterans Memorial Arena		
March 18, 1977 [e]	New Haven	United States	New Haven Veterans Memorial Coliseum	6,969	$51,265
March 19, 1977 [e]	Lewiston	United States	Central Maine Youth Center	4,400	$30,150
March 20, 1977 [e]	Providence	United States	Alumni Hall		
March 22, 1977 [e]	Boston	United States	Boston Music Hall		
March 23, 1977 [e]	Boston	United States	Boston Music Hall		
March 24, 1977 [e]	Boston	United States	Boston Music Hall		
March 25, 1977 [e]	Boston	United States	Boston Music Hall		

- a. New members Tour
- b. Born to Run Tour
- c. Chicken Scratch Tour
- d. Lawsuit Tour
- e. Lawsuit Drags Tour

== Cancellations and rescheduled shows ==
October 21, 1974	Blackwood, New Jersey	Lincoln Hall Auditorium	Rescheduled to November 21, 1974
October 27, 1974	Millersville, Pennsylvania	Millersville State College Campus Grounds	Cancelled
November 10, 1974	Dallas, Texas	Dallas Sportatorium	Cancelled
February 21, 1975	Bethlehem, Pennsylvania	Johnston Hall	Cancelled
February 27, 1975	University Heights, Ohio	John Carroll Gymnasium	Rescheduled to February 18, 1975
March 1, 1975	Syracuse, New York	Syracuse Repertory Theater	Cancelled
March 2, 1975	Plattsburgh, New York	Memorial Hall	Cancelled
March 9, 1975	New York City, New York	Felt Forum	Cancelled
August 29, 1975	Coral Gables, Florida	University Center Patio	Cancelled
September 9, 1975	Dallas, Texas	Electric Ballroom	Rescheduled to September 16, 1975 and moved to the Dallas Convention Center Theatre
September 11, 1975	Arlington, Texas	Texas Hall	Cancelled
October 10, 1975	Red Bank, New Jersey	Monmouth Arts Center	Rescheduled to October 11, 1975
October 14, 1975	Miami, Florida	Jai Alai Fronton	Rescheduled to November 14, 1975
October 28, 1975	Eugene, Oregon	Beall Concert Hall	Cancelled
November 9, 1975	Tampa, Florida	Jai Alai Fronton	Rescheduled to November 10, 1975
November 14, 1975	Miami, Florida	Jai Alai Fronton	Rescheduled to November 11, 1975
December 21, 1975	Toronto, Canada	Minkler Auditorium	Moved to the Seneca College Field House
April 26, 1976	Chattanooga, Tennessee	Tivoli Theatre	Moved to the Soldiers and Sailors Memorial Auditorium

== Sources ==
- Born in the U.S.A. Tour (tour booklet, 1984), Springsteen chronology.
- Hilburn, Robert. Springsteen. Rolling Stone Press, 1985. ISBN 0-684-18456-7.
- Marsh, Dave. Glory Days: Bruce Springsteen in the 1980s. Pantheon Books, 1987. ISBN 0-394-54668-7.
- Eliot, Marc with Appel, Mike. Down Thunder Road. Simon & Schuster, 1992. ISBN 0-671-86898-5.
- Santelli, Robert. Greetings From E Street: The Story of Bruce Springsteen and the E Street Band. Chronicle Books, 2006. ISBN 0-8118-5348-9.
- Brucebase's concert descriptions and chronology a gold mine of valuable material
