= Night (Bruce Springsteen song) =

Song by Bruce Springsteen

from the album Born to Run
- Released: August 25, 1975
- Recorded: 1975
- Studio: Record Plant in New York City
- Genre: Rock
- Length: 3:00
- Label: Columbia Records
- Songwriter: Bruce Springsteen
- Producers: Bruce Springsteen, Jon Landau

"Night" is a song by Bruce Springsteen which first appeared on the Born to Run album in 1975. Although this is one of the lesser known songs from Born to Run, "Night" has become somewhat of a stage favorite for the E Street Band. The song was not immediately played during the 1975 portions of the Born to Run Tour, but later became a frequent set-opener, especially during the 1976 and 1977 legs. It was still sometimes being used as an opening song decades later during the 2007–2008 Magic Tour.

The mood of the music is mostly exciting as are the lyrics which have a romantic quality as well. The music is propelled by Garry Tallent's bass guitar. It is similar to the album's famous title track in that both songs deal with men and their fast cars. The lyrics mostly describe the central character as a blue collar worker who, after working a full day, runs off into the night to go drag racing and search for the love of a woman. For the protagonist, the only freedom and joy comes when he is on the highway, and he lives for the nights and weekends when he can escape work. Like a couple of other songs on Born to Run, "Tenth Avenue Freeze-Out" and "She's the One", the story of the relationship is told in a flashback. The desperation and darkness of the lyrics makes a strong contrast with some of the other songs on the Born to Run album, which glorify night life. Although "Night" and "Born to Run" show Springsteen beginning to deal seriously with blue collar protagonists, he would develop the theme further on his next album, Darkness on the Edge of Town, in which he would portray additional facets of blue collar working life on songs such as "Badlands", "Adam Raised a Cain", "The Promised Land", "Prove It All Night" and, especially, "Factory". This central theme would later be explored on The River, especially in the song "Out in the Street", and became a focus of Springsteen's post-Darkness on the Edge of Town songwriting dealing with working class characters leading dead-end lives. In 1979, it was released as the B-side of the "Rosalita (Come Out Tonight)" single in Europe.

The song was recorded in a style similar to the album's title track "Born to Run". Springsteen wanted to emulate record producer Phil Spector's Wall of Sound technique where multiple instruments played at the same time with their sounds bleeding into each other's microphones. The result is a "wash" of sound where some individual instruments are difficult to define, yet blend in to create a dense orchestral ambiance.

== Personnel ==
Personnel was taken from the album's liner notes.

- Bruce Springsteen – guitar, vocals
- Garry Tallent – bass guitar
- Max Weinberg – drums
- Roy Bittan – piano, harpsichord, glockenspiel
- Clarence Clemons – saxophone
