= American Skin (41 Shots) =

2000 song by Bruce Springsteen

Single by Bruce Springsteen

from the album Live in New York City
- Released: April 24, 2001 (original live version); January 14, 2014 (new studio version)
- Recorded: March 2, 2001 (original live version); March 2013 (new studio version)
- Genre: Rock
- Length: 7:45/5:14 (original live version/short version); 7:22 (new studio version)
- Label: Columbia
- Songwriter: Bruce Springsteen
- Producers: Bruce Springsteen; Chuck Plotkin; Toby Scott

Bruce Springsteen singles chronology
"Sad Eyes" (1999)	"American Skin (41 Shots)" (2001)	"The Rising" (2002)

Music video
- "American Skin (41 Shots)" on YouTube

"American Skin (41 Shots)" is a song written by Bruce Springsteen, inspired by the police shooting and death of Amadou Diallo by four NYPD police officers who were subsequently acquitted on all charges.

The performance of the song was seen as controversial and led to boycotts and a call from the then Mayor of New York for Springsteen to not perform the song. Despite this, the song was performed throughout a ten date residency at Madison Square Garden, and has been performed on a number of subsequent tours, often dedicated to recent victims of police violence.

== Background ==
Springsteen wrote the song following the killing of an unarmed 23-year-old Guinean student, Amadou Diallo in the early morning of 4th February 1999. Diallo was fired upon by four NYPD plainclothes officers, part of the City's Street Crime Unit (SCU). The officers had mistaken Diallo for a suspected rapist and Diallo had reached into his pocket to produce his wallet containing ID.

One officer opened fire at Diallo, believing him to be reaching for a firearm, and the recoil from the gun caused the officer to fall backwards. This led the other three officers to believe their partner had been shot, at which point they fired their weapons at Diallo. Between them, the four officers fired 41 shots with semi-automatic pistols, killing Diallo in seconds.

The four officers were initially charged with second-degree murder but would be acquitted of all charges at trial in February 2000. However unrest and indignation continued following the verdict. A wrongful death suit was brought against the City of New York resulting in an out of court settlement for the Diallo family. The case also saw more public awareness of the activities of police units such as the SCU. Racial profiling and excessive force complaints continued to grow until the city disbanded the SCU as an active unit in 2002.

== Composition ==
"Though the song was critical, it was not 'anti-police' as some thought. The first voice you hear after the intro is from the policeman’s point of view, I worked hard for a balanced voice. I knew a diatribe would do no good. I just wanted to help people see the other guy’s point of view."

— Springsteen, on his approach to writing the song's lyrics

In the first episode of the Renegades: Born in the USA podcast with President Barack Obama, Springsteen stated that the killing of Amadou Diallo had led him to think about White privilege, stating that "this incident occurs and I start to think about it and I go, 'OK skin, skin is destiny', it’s like what a privilege it is to forget that you live in a particular body."

The song's verses are written from different points of view. The first verse is written from the perspective of the police officers, with the observer watching another officer "kneeling over his body in the vestibule". Much of this opening verse is repeated in the final verse. With the addition of the line "We’re baptized in these waters and in each other’s blood" being interpreted as using the imagery of Christian baptism as a plea for redemption from sins.

The chorus has been interpreted as Springsteen's attempt to capture the paranoia of the officers life and death decision: "Is it a gun? Is it a knife? Is it a wallet? This is your life". The chorus ends with the line "It ain't no secret, You can get killed just for living, In your American skin."

In the second verse, Springsteen presents another perspective away from the killing. The opening line identifies a mother and son named Liana and Charles. While getting her son ready for school, Liana makes her son promise her that if he is stopped by a law enforcement officer, that he will be polite and not run away, ending with the line "Promise Mama you'll keep your hands in sight".

The final chorus is altered slightly with the line "Is it a gun? Is it a knife? Is it in your heart? Is it in your eyes?" Springsteen has stated that this last chorus "asks the audience to look inside themselves, for their own collaboration in events."

== Live performance and controversy ==
The song was debuted on June 4, 2000 at the Philips Arena in Atlanta as part of the Bruce Springsteen and the E Street Band Reunion Tour concert, the band's last concert before a ten date residency at New York City's Madison Square Garden. The song garnered immediate attention, with music critics describing the song in detail and bootleg recordings being the subject of Internet leaks.

In the days before the New York concerts, a major controversy arose when rumors circulated that the band would perform the song in New York. As such, both the Presidents of the Patrolmen's Benevolent Association and the City's Police Commissioner called for a boycott of Springsteen's shows. The president of New York State's Fraternal Order of Police personally denounced Springsteen, describing him as a "dirtbag" and a "faggot".

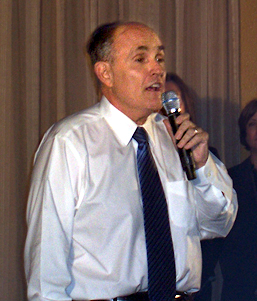
Rudy Giuliani speaking in 2000. Giuliani requested that Springsteen not perform the song at any of his New York shows.

The Mayor of New York city, Rudy Giuliani, who had praised the officers involved in the Diallo shooting, condemned Springsteen during a rally on June 12, and publicly requested that he not play the song in New York. Giuliani seemingly referenced the acquittal of the four officers earlier that year, stating that "there are still people trying to create the impression that the police officers are guilty, and they are going to feel strongly about that." The comments the Mayor and various police groups led to some police officers refusing to provide security for the band and a rally of hundreds of police officers against the songs performance. Despite this, the band performed the song throughout the ten dates, with Springsteen later acknowledging that "there was some booing".

=== Reaction ===
Despite the calls to boycott the shows, all ten concerts at Madison Square Garden would sell-out. While the criticism and accusations of the song being anti-police continued, the song was praised by others. Springsteen maintained that the accusations were misinterpreting the song and that its message was not anti-police but anti-brutality. Notably, the mother of Amadou Diallo, Kadiatou Diallo praised the song, stating that it was a sign people cared about her son which restored her faith in society. Later that year, Springsteen was given the Humanitarian Community Service Award by the NAACP.

Springsteen has stated that the negative response of some police officers to the performance would last for years, stating that "We took a lot of heat from the police for several years after that. There were some police officers giving us the New Jersey state bird, which I always felt was a result of not listening to it." Some journalists linked the continuing negative response to Springsteen's arrest on a reckless driving charge, after a police officer witnessed him drink a shot of tequila before getting on his motorcycle.

=== Later performances ===
In later performances, Springsteen has dedicated the song to victims of violent killings. In response to the killing of Trayvon Martin, Springsteen would again perform the song as part of the Wrecking Ball Tour. Notably, Springsteen performed the song just three days after the man who had fatally shot Trayvon Martin, George Zimmerman, was acquitted of second-degree murder, at his concert in Thomond Park, Limerick, Ireland. Springsteen introduced the song by saying "I want to send this one out as a letter back home. For justice for Trayvon Martin".

"That song is almost eight minutes long. That's how long it took George Floyd to die with a Minneapolis officer's knee buried into his neck. That's a long time. That's how long he begged for help and said he couldn't breathe. The arresting officer's response was nothing but silence and weight. Then he had no pulse. And still, it went on."

— Springsteen, dedicating the song to Floyd on his Sirius XM radio show

In the wake of the killing of Freddie Gray, Springsteen again played the song during the 2016 River Tour, most notably in Baltimore where he dedicating the performance to Gray. In June 2020, during a special live E Street Radio Sirius XM radio concert, Springsteen opened his set by playing "American Skin (41 Shots)" in response to the murders of George Floyd and Breonna Taylor. On April 7, 2024 Tom Morello once again joined Springsteen to perform a nearly 8 minute version the song, in a live performance at the Kia Forum in Los Angeles. This was the first live performance of the song by Bruce Springsteen and The E Street Band since their 2017 tour.

== Release history ==
A live performance of the song during the New York shows was released on the Live in New York City album, and this version appeared again on The Essential Bruce Springsteen in 2003. The first studio version of the song was released in April 2001, as a rare one-track radio promotional single on CD-R released in the USA only. This was accompanied by a music video featuring the performance from the New York City show directed by Jonathan Demme. A studio recording of the song was not publicly available until a second studio version was recorded in 2013 for the following years High Hopes album.

== Covers ==
Rock band Living Colour performed a cover of "American Skin (41 Shots)" at the Auditorium Stravinski in Montreaux, Switzerland on, July 20, 2001.

In 2016, singer-songwriter Jackson Browne performed a cover of "American Skin (41 Shots)" at Hardly Strictly Bluegrass in San Francisco's Golden Gate Park.

In 2016 Mary J. Blige sang a portion of the song to Hillary Clinton in an interview on Apple Music. The studio version of Blige's cover featured American rapper Kendrick Lamar.

In June 2020, the American band Black Veil Brides released a cover of "American Skin (41 Shots)" in support of Black Lives Matter.
