= The Main Point =

Coffee house in Bryn Mawr, Pennsylvania (1964–1981)

Coordinates: 40°01′21″N 75°19′15″W

The Main Point was a small coffeehouse venue in Bryn Mawr, Pennsylvania, that operated from 1964 to 1981. The venue hosted concerts by some of the top names in folk and traditional music, jazz, blues, rock, country music, and other musical genres, as well as comedy and poetry. The club, located on Lancaster Avenue, was known for its small intimate atmosphere and low ticket prices.

== History ==
The Main Point was started in 1964 as a small folk-based coffeehouse venue by four couples, Weld and Georgia Coxe, Janette and Bill Pierce, George and Charlotte Britton, and Jeanette and Bill Campbell, all of whom were inspired by the music and artists of the Philadelphia Folk Festival. After one or two seasons, the ownership was shared with a new co-owner, Bill Scarborough. Scarborough was the Main Point's booking director from 1964 to 1975. When asked at a peak in the Main Point's success how he made booking decisions, Scarborough cited several factors but admitted that, occasionally, his own musical tastes influenced him. "I think that the booking of a singer named Bruce Springsteen is the best example I can give you of personal taste and hunch entering into my final choice. Here was a new act out of nowhere, who happened to sign with a major label (Columbia), and put out an album that reminded me of the best of Dylan. I decided to book him as a headliner, even though he was barely known. We did alright with him, but not as well as we’d hoped. I still feel, though, that he’s going to be a big star." The venue was popular among both musicians and listeners. David Fricke, later a writer for Rolling Stone magazine, was in charge of press and public relations in through the mid-1970s.

The venue was popular for not only its music, but also for its homemade food and homebaked goods. The venue constantly ran into financial troubles related to its intimate size (ironically, its size was what made it so popular). Musicians gave benefit concerts for the coffeehouse to help it out of its financial straits. Some of these concerts were broadcast over the local progressive rock radio station WMMR, and many well known bootleg recordings have been made from these performances. The Main Point closed in 1981. One of the last acts to perform was local duo Burke and Calandra.

== The Point ==
The Point, the successor to The Main Point, was opened two doors down from the original Main Point in 1998 at 880 Lancaster Avenue. The original Main Point was at 874 Lancaster Avenue. The Point was owned and operated by Richard Kardon. It lost its lease and closed in June 2005. Point Entertainment (Kardon and talent buyer Jesse Lundy) continues to book shows around the greater Philadelphia area; they have booked talent for the Philadelphia Folk Festival from 2008 through 2015. .

== Concerts ==
The caliber of the performers, coupled with the intimate venue, resulted in many memorable performances. On February 5, 1975, Bruce Springsteen & The E Street Band played for 160 minutes, offering epic versions of "New York City Serenade" and "For You". The concert also featured the first live performance of "Thunder Road", under its earlier title, "Wings for Wheels". The concert was given as a benefit, broadcast over WMMR, and hosted by deejay Ed Sciaky. Later that year, Jackson Browne and David Lindley also performed in a series of benefits for the struggling club.
