= Prove It All Night =

1978 single by Bruce Springsteen

Single by Bruce Springsteen

from the album Darkness on the Edge of Town
- B-side: "Factory"
- Released: May 23, 1978
- Recorded: September 16, 1977
- Studio: The Record Plant; New York, New York
- Genre: Rock
- Length: 3:57
- Label: Columbia
- Songwriter: Bruce Springsteen
- Producers: Jon Landau, Bruce Springsteen

Bruce Springsteen singles chronology
"Tenth Avenue Freeze-Out" (1976)	"Prove It All Night" (1978)	"Badlands" (1978)

"Prove It All Night" is a song by the American singer-songwriter Bruce Springsteen, released on May 23, 1978, as the first single from his fourth studio album Darkness on the Edge of Town.

== Content ==
The protagonist promises to prove his love all night, a vow that can be seen as either opportunistic or youthfully optimistic, depending on one's point of view. Thus it can be experienced as either humorous or sincere. Lyrically the song is similar to other Springsteen numbers such as "Rosalita (Come Out Tonight)”, Born to Run and "Thunder Road". The entire song contains a sense of optimism that the two individuals' quest for love will someday be realized but, at the same time, it seems that the world is closing in on them in that the characters' chances of falling in love are growing more limited as time passes. The song begins with a piano intro played by Roy Bittan. The rhythm guitar work is quite faint, but fits the groove and feel of the song. Following the second stanza is a sax solo which precedes a somewhat intricate-sounding guitar solo by Springsteen. The solo, played quite fast, effectively voices the protagonist's mounting desire to elope.

Cash Box called it a "winner" with "strong upfront beat, chimes, piano/organ and [Clarence] Clemons' rich and rough sax" and "effective hook, raw singing, [and] searching guitar solo." Record World called it "an instantly-memorable Springsteen rocker, dominated by keyboards and sax."

An earlier take of the song has different lyrics; several lines and verses from "Something in the Night" were used instead.

== Chart performance ==
The single gained little traction with Top 40 radio stations, reaching only number 33 on the Billboard Hot 100 and number 57 in Canada.

== Live performances ==
"Prove It All Night" has been a regular selection in Springsteen and E Street Band concerts since its release. The most famous arrangement of it occurred during the 1978 Tour, when the song was reshaped into an epic lasting between seven and twelve minutes, with a long guitar solo by Springsteen over Roy Bittan's piano to introduce the song and a frenetic organ-and-guitar-over-drums outro. Excerpts of one such performance from a show at the Capitol Theatre in Passaic, New Jersey, on September 19th, 1978 was broadcast on the radio. The 1978 version of "Prove It All Night" became a fan favorite still referred to decades later. One of the criticisms of Springsteen's 1986 Live 1975–85 box set was that it omitted any such version of the song. The song was performed with this arrangement on two occasions on the River Tour in November 1980. A live version of the song did finally appear on Springsteen's 2001 release Live in New York City documenting the Reunion Tour, as did a Rising Tour performance on the 2003 Live in Barcelona DVD, but both were in a shorter, more conventional treatment.

In a concert in Barcelona during the Wrecking Ball Tour, Springsteen surprised the audience by playing the song again in the 1978 arrangement. It made its first appearance in the United States since 1980 by request at Fenway Park in Boston on August 15, 2012. It continued to make semi-regular appearances on the remainder of the tour, as well as on 2014's follow-up High Hopes Tour.

== Acclaim ==
The song was ranked as the number 6 single of 1978 by Dave Marsh and Kevin Stein and as one of the 7500 most important songs from 1944 through 2000 by Bruce Pollock.

== Personnel ==
According to authors Philippe Margotin and Jean-Michel Guesdon:

- Bruce Springsteen – vocals, guitars
- Roy Bittan – piano
- Clarence Clemons – saxophone
- Danny Federici – organ
- Garry Tallent – bass
- Steven Van Zandt – guitars, vocal harmonies
- Max Weinberg – drums
