= She's the One (Bruce Springsteen song) =

Song by Bruce Springsteen

from the album Born to Run
- A-side: "Tenth Avenue Freeze-Out"
- Released: August 25, 1975
- Recorded: June 1975
- Studio: Record Plant, New York City
- Genre: Rock
- Length: 4:30
- Label: Columbia
- Songwriter: Bruce Springsteen
- Producers: Bruce Springsteen, Jon Landau

"She's the One" is a song by Bruce Springsteen. Frequently featured in Springsteen and E Street Band concert performances, it first appeared on the Born to Run album in 1975. It was also released as the B-side to Springsteen's "Tenth Avenue Freeze-Out" single.

== Music and lyrics ==
"She's the One" was one of the songs that Springsteen wrote before beginning to record the Born to Run album, along with "Born to Run", "Thunder Road" and "Jungleland", although originally he was not sure whether to include it on the album. Several versions of the song were recorded for Born to Run between April and June 1975, and the June 1975 version recorded at 914 Sound Studios in Blauvelt, New York is the one that was officially released.

The topic of the song is the rock staple of an intensely attractive, but cold-hearted woman, who causes massive emotional turmoil for her lover. Although the singer knows the woman is a liar, he wants to believe her. The lyrics reflect both the joys and yearnings of summer nights. Like other songs on Born to Run, "Tenth Avenue Freeze-Out" and "Night", the story of the relationship is told in a flashback. Musically, it has a staccato beat and a rhythm reminiscent of the Bo Diddley beat. As if to emphasize the Diddley-like riff, Springsteen has sometimes led into "She's the One" in concert with a Diddley song — either "Bo Diddley" or "Mona". The percussive piano sound and the rhythms that are reminiscent of some Buddy Holly songs sound like an homage to older rock 'n' roll songs.

"She's the One" has connections with other Springsteen songs. The line from "Backstreets", "I hated you when you went away" was originally a line in "She's the One". "She's the One" includes references to French cream and French kisses, which were originally included in an early Springsteen song, "Santa Ana". Springsteen has claimed that he wrote the song primarily because he wanted to hear E Street Band saxophonist Clarence Clemons play its sax solo, and after he wrote the melody he then changed his mind.

== Live performances ==
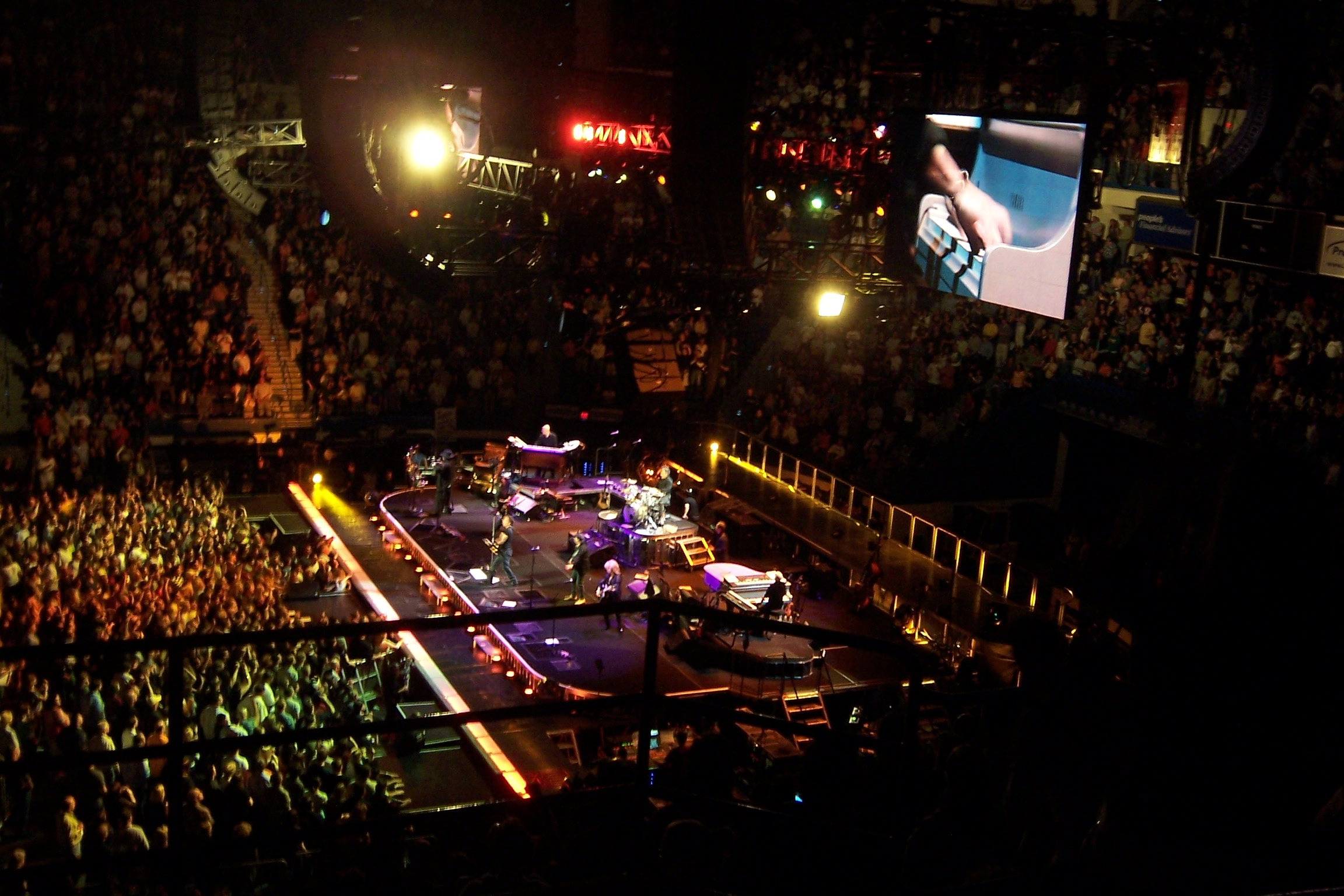
The percussive piano part is a highlighted feature of one of many concert performances of "She's the One" by Bruce Springsteen and the E Street Band. Working on a Dream Tour, Hartford Civic Center, April 24, 2009.

The song has become very popular live, and has been played 565 times as of 2023. Some fans have claimed that "She's the One" and "Born to Run" were first played at a concert where Springsteen opened for Bonnie Raitt at Harvard Square Theater in Cambridge, Massachusetts on May 9, 1974. This has never been confirmed, and bootlegs of the concert do not contain either of these songs. The first confirmed live performance of the song was on October 4, 1974.

== Critical reception ==
In a contemporary review, Robert Christgau of The Village Voice said that "She's the One" "fails the memory of Phil Spector's innocent grandeur". Pitchfork Media's Mark Richardson felt that it is "powerful and catchy", but because "Springsteen at this point didn't know much about women or relationships", "She's the One" does not successfully portray its character. On the other hand, Rolling Stone magazine later ranked it number 63 on its list of the 100 greatest Bruce Springsteen songs of all time.

== Personnel ==
According to authors Philippe Margotin and Jean-Michel Guesdon:

- Bruce Springsteen – vocals, guitar
- Garry Tallent – bass guitar
- Max Weinberg – drums
- Roy Bittan – piano, harpsichord, organ
- Clarence Clemons – saxophone
- Unknown musician – backing vocals
