= Tenth Avenue Freeze-Out =

Single by Bruce Springsteen

from the album Born to Run
- B-side: "She's the One"
- Released: January 1976
- Recorded: July 13, 1975 (completed)
- Studio: The Record Plant, New York City
- Genre: Rock; soul
- Length: 3:11
- Label: Columbia
- Songwriter: Bruce Springsteen
- Producers: Bruce Springsteen; Mike Appel; Jon Landau

Bruce Springsteen singles chronology
"Born to Run" (1975)	"Tenth Avenue Freeze-Out" (1976)	"Prove It All Night" (1978)

"Tenth Avenue Freeze-Out" is a song by the American singer-songwriter Bruce Springsteen, from his 1975 album Born to Run.

== Content ==
The song tells the story of the formation of the E Street Band. The meaning of the title is unclear. Springsteen says in the Born to Run documentary Wings for Wheels: The Making of Born to Run: "I still have no idea what it means. But it's important."

The song's protagonist, "Bad Scooter", is a pseudonym for Springsteen himself (as indicated by the initials they share). In the third verse, "Big Man joined the band" refers to Clarence Clemons, the band's long-time saxophonist.

As stated by Springsteen in the Wings for Wheels documentary, the idea for the composition of the horn intro was Steven Van Zandt's. The single was a chart dud, getting no higher than #83 on the Billboard Hot 100 in early 1976, and #82 in Canada. Record World said of the single release that "to find out what [Springsteen's] all about on vinyl, listen to this disc."

== Personnel ==
According to authors Philippe Margotin and Jean-Michel Guesdon:

- Bruce Springsteen – vocals, electric guitar, horn arrangements
- Garry Tallent – bass guitar
- Max Weinberg – drums
- Roy Bittan – piano
- Clarence Clemons – tenor saxophone
- Randy Brecker – trumpet, bugle
- Michael Brecker – tenor saxophone
- Dave Sanborn – baritone saxophone
- Wayne Andre – trombone
- Steve Van Zandt – horn arrangements

== Live performance history ==
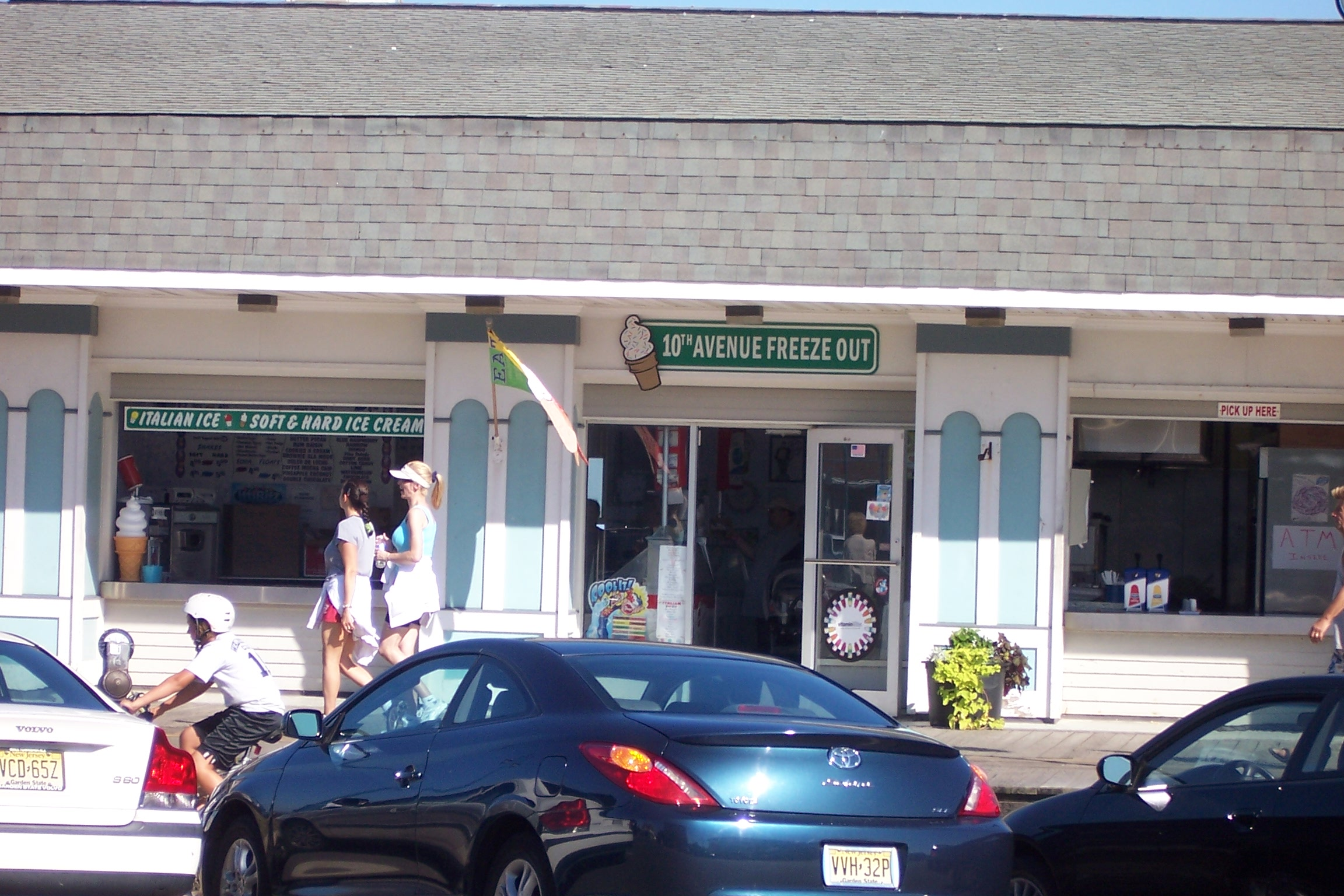
In Belmar, New Jersey – the town from which the E Street Band took its name – an ice cream stand is named after the song.

"Tenth Avenue Freeze-Out" has become a staple of Springsteen's E Street Band concert tours, with regular appearances from the 1975 and on the Born to Run tours through the 1984 legs of the Born in the U.S.A. Tour, with one of the latter documented on the later Live/1975–85, and the 1988 Tunnel of Love Express. It then returned with a featured regular spot on the 1999–2000 Reunion Tour, often used as an introduction of the band. An extended 20-minute version was captured on the subsequent Bruce Springsteen & The E Street Band: Live in New York City release, and was frequently played during most of the legs of the 2007–2008 Magic Tour and during the 2009 Working on a Dream Tour. It opened the four-song set at Springsteen and the band's high-profile half-time appearance at Super Bowl XLIII, which included Springsteen pointing out that the verse about "the Big Man" joining the band was the important part of the song.

A slower version of this song was played during the Born to Run tours, on December 31, 1975, in Philadelphia.

After Clemons' death, Springsteen used the song as a memorial/tribute to both him and the late Danny Federici on the Wrecking Ball Tour, the first E Street Band tour without Clemons. During the song's third verse of "Big Man joined the band", Springsteen paused the song where Clemons' sax solo would traditionally be performed while a video of Clemons and Federici played on the stage screens. On subsequent tours, Springsteen removed the pause from performances of the song, but kept the video tribute.

Springsteen joined his longtime friend Billy Joel on stage at Madison Square Garden on July 18, 2018 to perform the song (along with "Born to Run") for Joel's 100th appearance at MSG.

== Charts ==
Chart (1976)	Peak position
Canada Top Singles (RPM)	82
US Billboard Hot 100	83
US Cashbox Top 100	63
