= Rosalita (Come Out Tonight) =

Single by Bruce Springsteen

from the album The Wild, the Innocent & the E Street Shuffle
- B-side: "Night"
- Released: December 1979 (Netherlands)
- Recorded: 1973
- Studio: 914 Sound, Blauvelt, New York
- Genre: Rock and roll
- Length: 7:00
- Label: Columbia
- Songwriter: Bruce Springsteen
- Producers: Mike Appel; Jim Cretecos

Bruce Springsteen singles chronology
"The Promised Land" (1978)	"Rosalita (Come Out Tonight)" (1979)	"Hungry Heart" (1980)

Music video
- Rosalita (Come Out Tonight) on Youtube.com

"Rosalita (Come Out Tonight)" is a 1973 song by the American singer-songwriter Bruce Springsteen, from his The Wild, the Innocent & the E Street Shuffle album, and is especially famed as a concert number for Springsteen and The E Street Band. The song, which clocks in at just over seven minutes, is a story of forbidden love between the singer and Rosalita, whose parents disapprove of his life in a rock and roll band. It is included on the compilation albums The Essential Bruce Springsteen and Bruce Springsteen & The E Street Band Greatest Hits. In 2021, Rolling Stone ranked it the 446th greatest song of all time on their updated 500 Greatest Songs of All Time list.

== Reception ==
Never released as a single in U.S. and generally unknown upon its initial album release, "Rosalita" began to get FM radio airplay when an advance version of "Born to Run" was distributed to rock radio stations. As Springsteen gained commercial success, "Rosalita" became one of his most popular airplay tracks, and is still heard on classic rock radio. The song, despite never receiving an official US single release, has been heavily lauded by music critics in the years since its release in 1973. On its release Ken Emerson of Rolling Stone dubbed it "a raucous celebration of desire." In Rock Albums of the Seventies (1981), Robert Christgau described it as "more lyrical and ironic than you could have dreamed". George P Pelecanos of Uncut magazine has called it "One of the great rock'n roll performances, and as close to a perfect song as anyone's ever recorded," while Chris T-T in the same publication declared "Never mind The Beatles or The Rolling Stones, this is the best rock'n roll track of all time." The song is one of The Rock and Roll Hall of Fame's 500 Songs that Shaped Rock and Roll. Its music video occupies the number 71 spot on Rolling Stone's 1993 list of the top 100 videos.

Though it was not released as a single in the US (or anywhere at the time of the album's release), "Rosalita (Come Out Tonight)" was released as a single in the Netherlands and some other European countries in 1979.

== Music video ==
In 1984, many years after the song's initial release, MTV began showing a music video for the song. The video was a straight concert performance (from a Darkness Tour performance on July 8, 1978, at the Arizona Veterans Memorial Coliseum in Phoenix, Arizona) that included band introductions and female fans rushing the stage.

In 1979, a live concert performance was shown on the BBC2 television show The Old Grey Whistle Test. This performance was later released on a compilation DVD of performances from the show.

== Live performances ==
For many years, dating back virtually to when the song was written, "Rosalita" always closed the regular set in Springsteen concerts, often elongated to incorporate extended band introductions. It was the one "sure thing" in a Springsteen set list and celebrated as such. Steven Van Zandt changed his performances of the song from the Born to Run tours to The River Tour, and during the River Tour on November 2, 1980, Springsteen changed the lyrics to "Rosie, relax and let's have a little fun cause Rosie, my record just went to number one" celebrating the fact that Springsteen just had his first Billboard number-one album.

On October 19, 1984, in the Tacoma Dome in Tacoma, Washington, during the Born in the U.S.A. Tour, "Rosalita" was dropped from the show, not to reappear. Springsteen biographer Dave Marsh said this was done to "disrupt the ritual expectations of the fanatic fans [...] establishing through a burst of creativity just who was boss [...] he'd liberated the show from an albatross, a song that was too long and had long since stopped breathing."

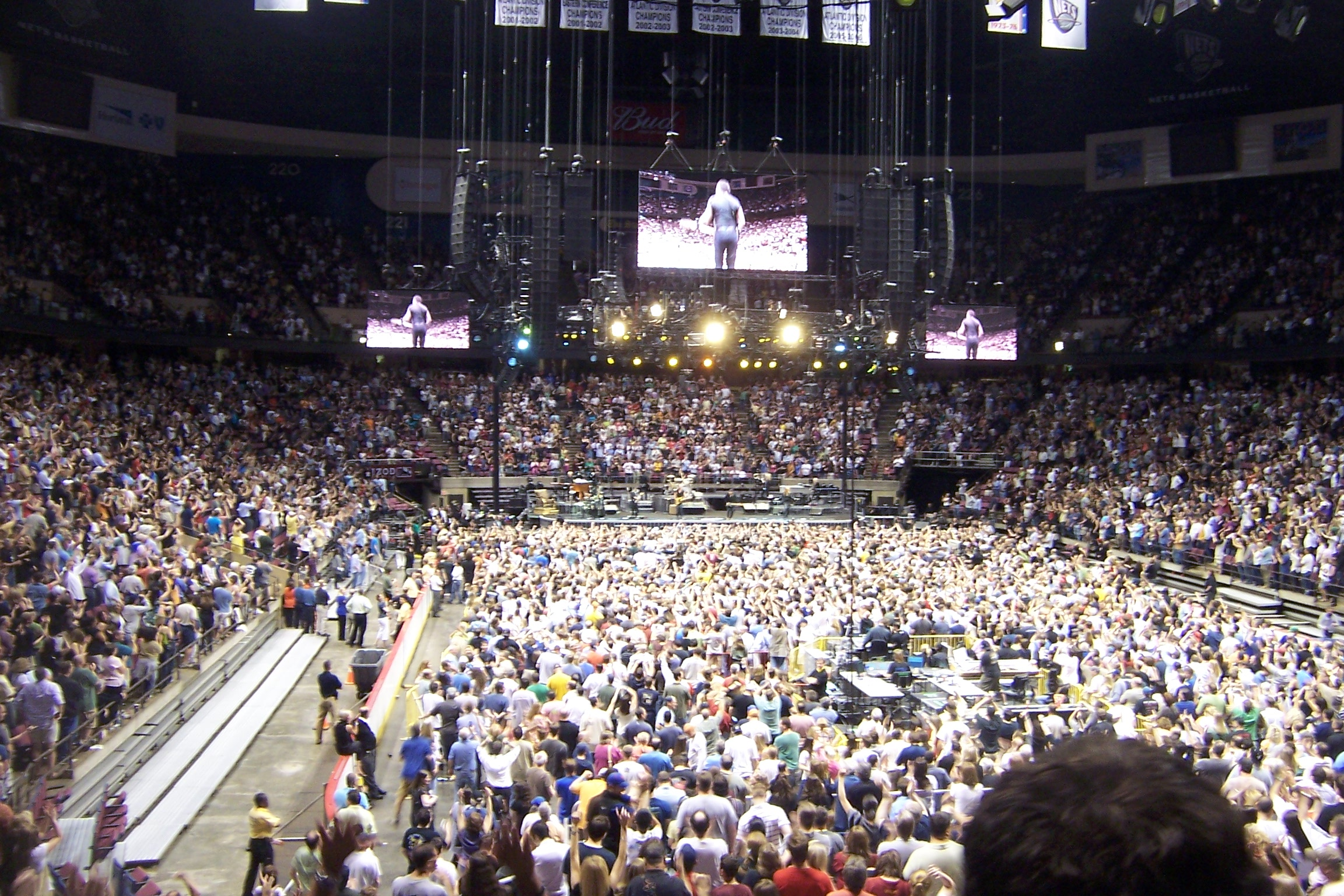
"Rosalita" in the swamps of Jersey: House lights up for the final song of the May 21, 2009 show at Izod Center.

For many years, "Rosalita" made only rare or sporadic appearances, leading to fans campaigning for the song to be played by holding banners or placards saying "Let Rosie Come Out Tonight!" during shows. Springsteen occasionally granted the wish, though, such as during the last show of the above-mentioned tour in 1985 at the Los Angeles Memorial Coliseum, or on most of the quick American leg of the 1988 Tunnel of Love Express (it was dropped before the end, and did not appear on the European leg), or on the last night of a 15-show stand at the Continental Airlines Arena in New Jersey on the Reunion Tour in 1999. Finally, during the U.S. outdoor stadium portion of The Rising Tour in Summer 2003, "Rosalita" was inserted into the encores and was played in all 33 of those shows.

During the 2007–2008 Magic Tour, the song made sporadic appearances, sometimes in reaction to audience signs requesting it. On the July 4 show in Gothenburg, Van Zandt brought back the famous "double-mike" ditty he and Springsteen used to do in the 1970s with the song's chorus. "Rosalita" continued to make sporadic appearances as the final encore during the 2009 Working on a Dream Tour. Beginning with the Wrecking Ball tour, the song became a regular part of encores.

== Personnel ==
From Best of Bruce Springsteen Liner Notes

- Bruce Springsteen – vocals, guitar
- Clarence Clemons – tenor saxophone, backing vocals
- Danny Federici - organ, backing vocals
- Vini "Mad Dog" Lopez – drums, percussion, backing vocals
- David Sancious – piano
- Garry Tallent – bass

== Certifications ==
Certifications and sales for "Rosalita (Come Out Tonight)"
Region	Certification	Certified units/sales
United States (RIAA)	Gold	500,000^{‡}
^{‡} Sales+streaming figures based on certification alone.
