= Backstreets =

Song by Bruce Springsteen

from the album Born to Run
- Released: August 25, 1975
- Recorded: April 25 – July 18, 1975
- Studio: Record Plant, New York City
- Genre: Rock
- Length: 6:32
- Label: Columbia
- Songwriter: Bruce Springsteen
- Producers: Bruce Springsteen, Jon Landau, Mike Appel

"Backstreets" is a song by Bruce Springsteen from the album Born to Run, which was released in 1975. In the original vinyl release, it concludes side one of the record.

== Structure ==
"Backstreets" begins with a minute-long instrumental introduction that features pianist Roy Bittan playing both piano and organ, with only occasional traces of any other instruments being heard. In his review of Born to Run for Rolling Stone, writer Greil Marcus said:

"Backstreets" ... begins with music so stately, so heartbreaking, that it might be the prelude to a rock & roll version of The Iliad.

"Backstreets" has also been interpreted as a narrative about a homosexual relationship because the name Terry is sexually ambiguous. It has also been said to potentially represent a platonic but intense friendship between two men that has faded. However, listening to any of the numerous bootleg versions of "Backstreets" from the 1978 Darkness Tour, Terry is repeatedly referred to as "she" and "little girl," indicating that Terry is indeed a woman. Another interpretation is that it is about Springsteen's relationship with his early 1970s girlfriend, Diane Lozito. In his autobiography, Born to Run, Springsteen states that "Backstreets" is about a broken friendship.

The melody and organ bear some resemblance to "Positively 4th Street" by Bob Dylan, an influence of Springsteen's. Rolling Stone claims that it echoes mid-1960s Dylan, especially the organ part reminiscent of Blonde on Blonde.

== Personnel ==
Personnel was taken from the album's liner notes.

- Bruce Springsteen – guitar, vocals
- Garry Tallent – bass guitar
- Max Weinberg – drums
- Roy Bittan – piano, organ

== Live performance history and interlude ==
Starting in 1977 and most prominently during the 1978 Darkness Tour, Springsteen often added a semi-improvised interlude in between the final chorus and the outro. It usually involved Springsteen's singing solo accompanied by the piano. The other instruments then joined in as the interlude built to a climax. It elaborated on the story of the protagonist and Terry. It differed from performance to performance but frequently involved the protagonist's reminiscing about a good time he and Terry had shared, followed by an emotional condemnation of her subsequent betrayal.

This interlude has become known to Springsteen fans as the "Sad Eyes" interlude (not to be confused with the Springsteen song of the same name) due to frequently occurring lyrics stating that Terry had sad eyes or should dry her tears. It also has been referred to as the "Baby I remember you" or "Little girl don't cry" interlude. Parts of the interlude later materialized in recast form as the song "Drive All Night" on The River album in 1980. The interlude version of "Backstreets" has not been performed in full since; however, it can be heard on numerous fan bootlegs from that tour and Springsteen occasionally sings a very small part of the original interlude in contemporary live versions.

In 2007, during Springsteen and the E Street Band's Magic Tour, "Backstreets" frequently found its way into the set list, most likely as a tribute to Springsteen's longtime friend Terry Magovern, who died earlier that year. On April 22, 2008, it was the opening song of the first show following the death of longtime band member Danny Federici.

== Critical reception ==
Rolling Stone rated "Backstreets" to be the sixth greatest Springsteen song of all time.

== Cultural references ==
The Irish folk/rock band Stockton's Wing took its name from the line "Slow dancin' in the dark on the beach at Stockton's Wing..."
