= Born to Run (song) =

1975 single by Bruce Springsteen

Single by Bruce Springsteen

from the album Born to Run
- B-side: "Meeting Across the River"
- Released: August 25, 1975
- Recorded: January 8 – August 6, 1974
- Studio: 914 (Blauvelt, New York)
- Genre: Rock
- Length: 4:30
- Label: Columbia
- Songwriter: Bruce Springsteen
- Producers: Bruce Springsteen; Mike Appel

Bruce Springsteen singles chronology
"Spirit in the Night" (1973)	"Born to Run" (1975)	"Tenth Avenue Freeze-Out" (1976)

Music video
- "Born to Run" on YouTube

"Born to Run" is a song by the American singer-songwriter Bruce Springsteen and the title track of his third studio album, Born to Run (1975). It was Springsteen's first worldwide single release, although it achieved little initial success outside of the United States. Within the U.S., however, it received extensive airplay on progressive or album-oriented rock radio stations. The single was also Springsteen's first Top 40 hit on the Billboard Hot 100, peaking at No. 23.

"Born to Run" was met with critical acclaim and is considered Springsteen's signature song. It was ranked number 27 on Rolling Stone's 2021 list of the "500 Greatest Songs of All Time", the highest placement for a song by Springsteen. It was also included in The Rock and Roll Hall of Fame's 500 Songs that Shaped Rock and Roll. Upon release, music critic Robert Christgau took note of its wall of sound influence and called it "the fulfillment of everything 'Be My Baby' was about and lots more".

== Composition ==
In late 1973, on the road in Tennessee, Springsteen awoke with the title "Born to Run", which he wrote down. According to him, it was the first spark of the later song.

Written in the first person, the song is a love letter to a girl named Wendy, for whom the hot rod-riding protagonist seems to possess the passion to love, just not the patience. However, Springsteen has noted that it has a much simpler core: getting out of Freehold. U.S. Route 9, a highway passing through Freehold, is mentioned from the lyric "sprung from cages out on Highway 9".

In his 1996 book Songs, Springsteen relates that while the beginning of the song was written on guitar around the opening riff, the song's writing was finished on piano, the instrument that most of the Born to Run album was composed on. The song was recorded in the key of E major. Some of the lead guitar parts were inspired by Duane Eddy's lead guitar style.

In the period prior to the release of Born to Run Springsteen was becoming well known (especially in his native northeast US) for his live shows. "Born to Run" joined his concert repertoire well before the release of the album, being performed in concert by May 1974, if not earlier.

The first recording of the song was made by Allan Clarke of the British group the Hollies, although its release was delayed, only appearing after Springsteen's own now-famous version.

== Recording ==
In recording the song Springsteen first earned his noted reputation for perfectionism, laying down as many as eleven guitar tracks to get the sound just right. The recording process and alternate ideas for the song's arrangement are described in the Wings For Wheels documentary DVD included in the 2005 reissue Born to Run 30th Anniversary Edition package.

On January 8, 1974, Springsteen met his manager, Mike Appel, Clarence Clemons, and the other members of his band at 914 Sound Studios, Blauvelt, New York, to rehearse two new compositions, "Jungleland" and "Born to Run", both of which were lacking lyrics. He continued working on both songs at his home in New Jersey. The original backing track was recorded on May 21, 1974, after rehearsal sessions. Vocals were recorded on June 26, 1974. Recording was not completed until August 6, 1974, when mixing began on seventy-two tracks to the sixteen available at 914 Studios, including strings, more than one dozen guitar tracks, sax, drums, glockenspiel, bass, multiple keyboards and a variety of voices. The core instrumental backing track, which had been re-recorded, was mixed, along with numerous test arrangements, backing vocals, double-tracked vocals and strings, and finally the one chosen for release. Springsteen and Mike Appel were the producers, and Louis Lahav was chief engineer. After finally going in the can, the tapes sat for a year, waiting for the rest of the album to be completed.

A pre-release version of the song, with a slightly different mix, was given by Appel to disc jockey Ed Sciaky of WMMR in Philadelphia, and played with Springsteen as his special guest on November 3, 1974, and within a couple of weeks this version was given to other progressive rock radio outlets in the Northeast as well, including WNEW-FM in New York City, WMMS in Cleveland, WBCN in Boston, and WVBR in Ithaca, New York. It became quite popular on these stations, and led to older cuts from Springsteen's first two albums being played, as anticipation built for the new album. When Springsteen did a show at the Main Point, Bryn Mawr, Pennsylvania, on February 5, 1975, with Sciaky as host, the crowd sang along to "Born to Run".

== Music videos ==
No music video was made for the original release of "Born to Run".

In 1987, a video was released to MTV and other channels, featuring a live performance of "Born to Run" from Springsteen and the E Street Band's 1984–1985 Born in the U.S.A. Tour, interspersed with clips of other songs' performances from the same tour. It closed with a "Thank you" message to Springsteen's fans. In 1988, director Meiert Avis shot a video of an acoustic version of the song during the Tunnel of Love Express tour. Both videos are included in the compilations Video Anthology / 1978-88 and The Complete Video Anthology / 1978-2000.

== Reception ==
At the time of the single release, Billboard described "Born to Run" as "one of the best rock anthems to individual freedom ever created," describing it as "a monster song with a piledriver arrangement" that could become Springsteen's biggest hit yet. Cash Box said that "Springsteen sounds like a cross between Roger McGuinn (from his Byrds days) and nobody else we've ever heard."

In 1980 the New Jersey State Assembly passed a resolution naming "Born to Run" the "unofficial rock theme of our State's youth." The bill failed to pass the state Senate, owing to some of the song's lyrics being about a desire to leave New Jersey.

== Accolades ==
- In 2016, "Born to Run" was ranked No. 16 in Pitchfork's list of "The 200 Best Songs of the 1970s"
- In 2004, the song was ranked No. 6 in WXPN's list of The 885 All-Time Greatest Songs.
- Rolling Stone magazine's list of the 500 Greatest Songs of All Time placed it at No. 27 in 2020
- The song came in at No. 920 in Q's list of the "1001 Greatest Songs Ever" in 2003, in which they described the song as "best for working class heroes."
- It is one of The Rock and Roll Hall of Fame's 500 Songs that Shaped Rock and Roll.
- In 2001, the RIAA's Songs of the Century placed the song 135th (out of 365).
- In 1999, National Public Radio included the song in the "NPR 100", NPR's music editors' compilation of the one hundred most important American musical works of the 20th century.

== Live performances ==
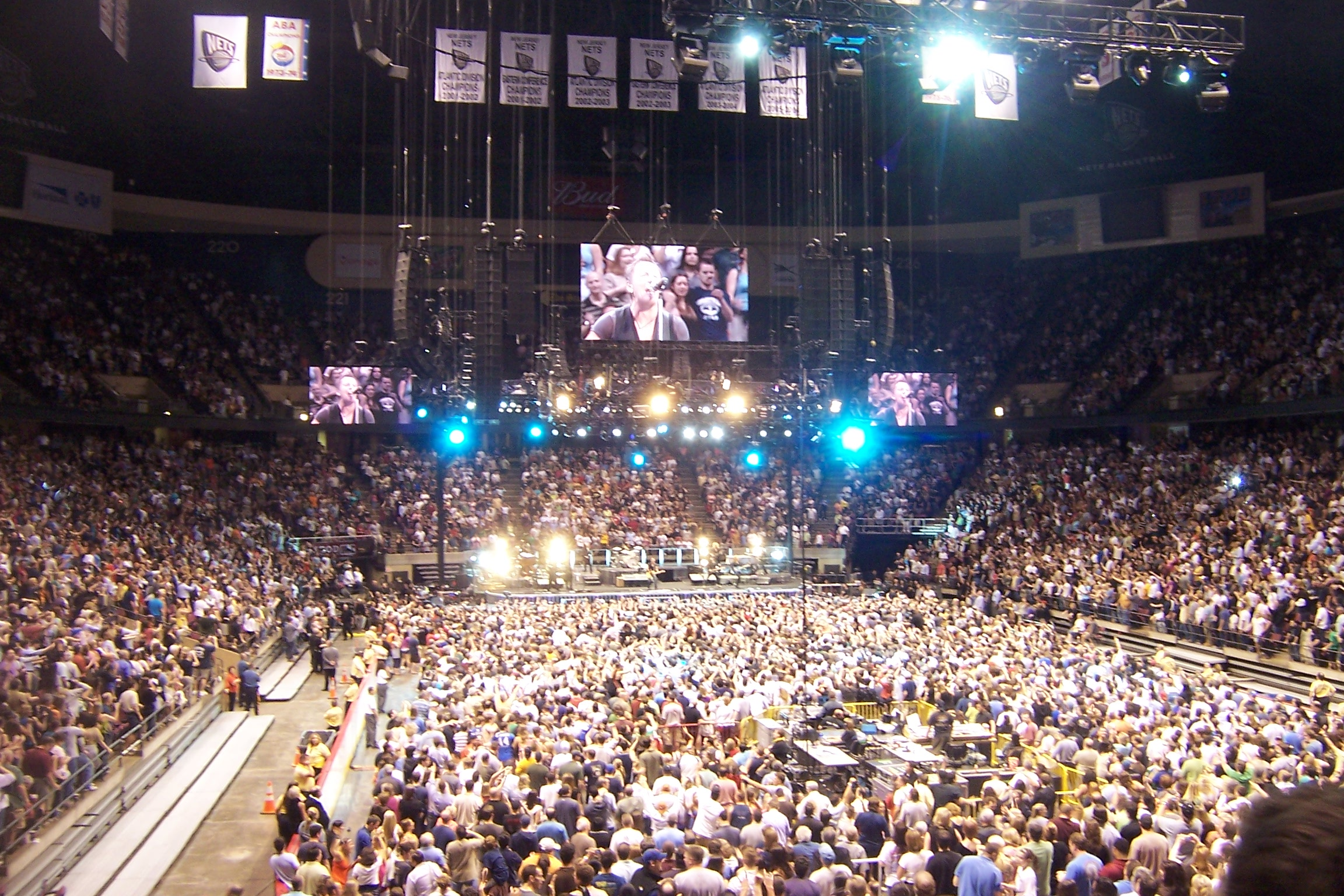
Typically house lights are on for "Born to Run", as depicted here in Izod Center in New Jersey, 2009.

The song has been played at nearly every non-solo Springsteen concert since 1975 (although it was not included in the 2006 Sessions Band Tour) and is his most-performed song live. Most of the time the house lights are turned fully on and fans consistently sing along with Springsteen's signature wordless vocalizations throughout the song's performance.

The song has also been released in live versions on seven albums or DVDs:

- A 1975 Born to Run Tour rendition on Hammersmith Odeon London '75, released in 2006;
- A 1985 Born in the U.S.A. Tour runthrough on Live/1975-85, released in 1986;
- A starkly different 1988 solo acoustic guitar performance from the Tunnel of Love Express on Chimes of Freedom, a 1988 EP;
- A 2000 Reunion Tour version on Bruce Springsteen & the E Street Band: Live In New York City, released in 2001 (the song closes disc one but does not appear on the track listing of the album cover);
- A 2002 Rising Tour take on the Live in Barcelona DVD, released in 2003.
- A 2009 Working on a Dream Tour performance on the DVD London Calling: Live in Hyde Park which was released in 2010.
- A 2018 Springsteen on Broadway performance, released on a Netflix special and an album of the same name at the end of the year.

"Born to Run" was also performed as the second number of four during Springsteen and the E Street Band's halftime performance at Super Bowl XLIII.

On Jon Stewart's last episode as host of The Daily Show on August 6, 2015, Springsteen performed "Land of Hope and Dreams" and "Born to Run".

== Cover versions ==
- On August 25, 2015, the 40th anniversary of Born to Run's release, indie rock band Superchunk shared a live cover of the title track. This performance also featured ...And You Will Know Us By the Trail of Dead and Crooked Fingers.
- A cover of the song appears on Frankie Goes to Hollywood's 1984 debut album, Welcome to the Pleasuredome.
- H.E.R. recorded a cover version of the song which was featured in a Dove commercial broadcast during Super Bowl LIX in 2025.

== In popular culture ==
"Born to Run" was the goal song of choice for the United States men's national ice hockey team at the 2023 IIHF World Championship in Tampere, Finland and Riga, Latvia.

In 2005, the song appeared in the original television broadcast of Bad Girls. The song was played during the memorial service for character Yvonne Atkins, earlier in the series Yvonne had stated she was a fan of Bruce Springsteen. Due to copyright reasons, future broadcasts and home media have removed the song.

The song is referenced frequently in the 1999 Koushun Takami novel Battle Royale as the main character Shuya Nanahara's favorite example of the (in the novel's setting) banned genre of rock music. A scene where the song is sung by him serves as an important bonding event for the main characters, and the very last lines of the book are a pastiched, personalised version of a section of the lyrics imagined by Shuya, drawing parallels between the song and the events of the novel.

Parts of the lyric were punned in the February 7, 2016, edition of the comic strip Pearls Before Swine.

== Track listing ==
1. "Born to Run" – 4:31
2. "Meeting Across the River" – 3:18

The B-side was simply another cut from the album; Springsteen would not begin releasing unused tracks as B-sides until 1980.

== Personnel ==
Personnel taken from Born to Run liner notes, except where noted.

- Bruce Springsteen – guitar, vocals
- Ernest "Boom" Carter – drums
- Clarence Clemons – saxophone
- Danny Federici – organ, glockenspiel
- David Sancious – piano, Fender Rhodes piano (Note: Margotin and Guesdon also add that Sancious may have played a synthesizer.)
- Garry Tallent – bass guitar

== Charts ==
=== Weekly charts ===
Chart (1975–76)	Peak position
Australia	38
Belgium (Ultratop 50 Wallonia)	29
Canadian Top Singles (RPM)	53
Ireland (IRMA)	81
Sweden (Sverigetopplistan)	17
US Billboard Hot 100	23
US Cash Box Top 100	17
US Record World 100 Top Pops	22

=== Weekly charts (Live Version) ===
Chart (1987)	Peak position
Europe (Eurochart Hot 100)	51
Irish Singles Chart	9
UK	16

=== Year-end charts ===
Chart (1975)	Position
Canada	188

== Certifications ==
Region	Certification	Certified units/sales
Australia (ARIA)	2× Platinum	140,000^{‡}
Denmark (IFPI Danmark)	Gold	45,000^{‡}
Italy (FIMI)	Gold	25,000^{‡}
New Zealand (RMNZ)	2× Platinum	60,000^{‡}
United Kingdom (BPI)	Platinum	600,000^{‡}
United States (RIAA)	2× Platinum	2,000,000^{‡}
^{‡} Sales+streaming figures based on certification alone.
