= Thunder Road (song) =

Song by Bruce Springsteen

from the album Born to Run
- Released: August 25, 1975
- Recorded: July 16, 1975 (completed)
- Studio: The Record Plant, New York City
- Genre: Rock; folk rock
- Length: 4:49
- Label: Columbia; Sony
- Songwriter: Bruce Springsteen
- Producers: Bruce Springsteen; Jon Landau; Mike Appel

Music video
- "Thunder Road (Live at the Hammersmith Odeon, London '75)" on YouTube

"Thunder Road" is a song written and recorded by American singer-songwriter Bruce Springsteen. It is the opening track on his breakthrough album Born to Run. While never charting substantially as a single, "Thunder Road" is nevertheless considered one of Springsteen's greatest songs and one of the top rock songs in history. It is ranked number 111 on Rolling Stone's 500 Greatest Songs of All Time list.

== Composition and recording ==
"Thunder Road" was written by Springsteen while at his living room piano in Long Branch, New Jersey. In October 1974, it existed as a solo recording, "Chrissie's Song", that included the line, "leave what you've lost, leave what's grown cold, Thunder Road". By early 1975, Springsteen had combined lyrics from another composition, "Walking in the Street", forming a new song, "Wings for Wheels", which he debuted on February 5, 1975, at a benefit for a local club, The Main Point, radio broadcast in the Philadelphia area, and featuring four yet-to-be-released Born to Run songs. Still unsatisfied, he finished dismantling "Walking in the Street", imported its main coda into "Wings for Wheels" as an instrumental ending, and renamed the song "Thunder Road". Springsteen stated at a 1978 concert that the name of his song had been inspired by seeing a poster of the 1958 Robert Mitchum film Thunder Road, though he did not see the film itself.

On April 13, 1975, music critic and record producer Jon Landau officially joined the album's production team, marking the start of a life-long professional relationship. At Landau's suggestion, production was moved from 914 Sound Studios to Record Plant studios in Manhattan. When sessions began on April 18, Jimmy Iovine, fresh from recording John Lennon's "Walls and Bridges", replaced Louis Lahav (who returned to Israel in March) as engineer. Springsteen later describes Iovine as a "brilliant imposter" and a "young studio dog with fastest learning curve I've ever seen". After three intensive days (April 18, 19 and 23) working on "Thunder Road", nothing further was noted in studio logs until July 15–16, when final overdubs and mixing were done.

In his autobiography, Springsteen says he loosely envisioned Born to Run as a series of vignettes, following its character throughout the day, with "Thunder Road" serving as an "invitation" to the album and opening with a harmonica that suggests the beginning of a new day. Springsteen also describes Landau as an "astute arranger and editor" who "guarded against overplaying and guided our record toward a more streamlined sound". Speaking to author Brian Hiatt about "Thunder Road" in 2005, Landau states it "was fantastic, but it was a little unwieldy, a little unfocused, a little more like a jam piece. … I remember talking with Bruce about a few ideas about how to just reshuffle the deck a little bit, and keep the song building from the very beginning right through the end."

== Lyrics and music ==
The lyrics to "Thunder Road" describe a young woman named Mary, her boyfriend, and their "one last chance to make it real". Musically, the song opens with a quiet piano (Roy Bittan) and harmonica (Springsteen) introduction, meant, as Springsteen said years later in the Wings for Wheels documentary, as a signifier that something was about to happen. The title phrase is not used until the middle section of the song. After the closing line, a tenor saxophone and Fender Rhodes duet is played by Clarence Clemons and Bittan in the instrumental coda.

In this song, Springsteen mentions Roy Orbison "singing for the lonely" on the radio. Orbison, one of whose best-known songs is "Only the Lonely" (1960), was a huge influence on Springsteen.

On July 17, 2021, after 46 years, Jon Landau, Springsteen's longtime manager and co-producer of Born to Run, said the line "Mary's dress waves" was corrected to read "Mary's dress sways" on brucespringsteen.net. It was referred to as a "typo".

During Springsteen's writing of the lyrics to "Thunder Road", instead of "skeleton frames of burned out Chevrolets", he had written, "skeletons found by exhumed shallow graves". E Street drummer Max Weinberg convinced Springsteen to move away from the darker lyrics and stay consistent with the blue-collar spirit of the album.

== Reception ==
In 2004, "Thunder Road" was ranked number one on the list of the "885 All-Time Greatest Songs" compiled by WXPN, the University of Pennsylvania's public radio station. The song came in at number 226 in Q magazine's list of the "1001 Greatest Songs Ever" in 2003, in which they described the song as "best for pleading on the porch". Julia Roberts, when asked which song lyric described her most accurately, chose "Thunder Road"'s "You ain't a beauty, but hey, you're alright." The song is featured in the book 31 Songs by British author Nick Hornby.

It is ranked number 111 on Rolling Stone's 500 Greatest Songs of All Time list. It is also ranked number 3 on the magazine's list of his best songs. In June 2026, CBS News included the song in its list of the 250 essential American songs of the past 250 years.

== Live performance history ==
In 1992, Springsteen recorded "Thunder Road" with an electric band for the special In Concert/MTV Plugged. In 1997, five years after the concert was recorded, the album was rereleased in the US and appeared for the first time on the US charts, peaking at number 189 on the Billboard 200. The recording of "Thunder Road" from the concert was nominated for a Grammy Award for Best Male Rock Vocal Performance.

On June 14, 2008, on stage at Millennium Stadium in Cardiff, Springsteen dedicated a performance of the song to political broadcast analyst Tim Russert, a longtime Springsteen fan who had died the previous day. On June 18, 2008, Springsteen performed the song, with acoustic guitar, for a Russert memorial event in Washington DC via tape-delayed satellite.

On November 7, 2016, Springsteen performed the song at a Hillary Clinton presidential election rally in Philadelphia.

In 2016, a fan made a video compilation of Springsteen performing "Thunder Road" over 41 years. The video illustrates how Springsteen's performance of the song has changed over the years.

== Personnel ==
According to authors Philippe Margotin and Jean-Michel Guesdon:

- Bruce Springsteen – vocals, guitar, harmonica
- Garry Tallent – bass guitar
- Max Weinberg – drums
- Roy Bittan – piano, glockenspiel, backing vocals
- Mike Appel – backing vocals
- Steve Van Zandt – backing vocals
- Clarence Clemons – saxophone

== Legacy ==
"Thunder Road" is a classic rock staple and has been covered by artists such as Eric Church, Melissa Etheridge, Cowboy Junkies, Badly Drawn Boy, Brazilian singer Renato Russo, Frank Turner, Tori Amos, Brian Vander Ark (Live at Eddie's Attic), Kevin Rowland, Nate Ruess during his Grand Romantic world tour, Matt Nathanson, Mary Lou Lord, and Bonnie 'Prince' Billy with Tortoise. (Tortoise's version is interpreted in minor key.) Adam Duritz of Counting Crows often sings large portions of the lyrics to "Thunder Road" in the middle of their song "Rain King". Phish covered the song in 2011 as a tribute to Clemon's passing.

Michael Chabon referenced "Thunder Road" in his 1988 novel, The Mysteries of Pittsburgh. "We were discussing Born to Run, by Bruce Springsteen. I said that it was the most Roman Catholic record album ever made. 'Look what you've got,' I said. 'You've got Mary dancing like a vision across the porch while the radio plays...."

In a 2010 interview, Stephen Merchant stated that the script for the film Cemetery Junction was loosely based upon the lyrics of "Thunder Road".

In 2011, a limited, signed, letterpressed, handbound chapbook with the lyrics of "Thunder Road" along with Nick Hornby's essay on the song was released. (26 copies were signed by both, Bruce Springsteen and Nick Hornby, 200 copies were signed by Hornby only.)

In 2016, actor, writer and director Jim Cummings released a comedy/drama film called Thunder Road, which includes an extensive scene depicting Cummings dressed as a policeman at his mother's funeral singing along to "Thunder Road", playing on his daughter's pink boombox. It won the Short Film Grand Jury Prize at the 2016 Sundance Film Festival.

== Sequel ==
Sometime after the release of Born to Run, Springsteen wrote a follow-up to "Thunder Road" called "The Promise", which explicitly mentions the first song by name, but reveals a far more pessimistic outlook on the narrator's life and future. Unreleased for years, "The Promise" gained considerable legend for its 1978 Tour performances; it finally materialized in a re-recorded version on 1999's 18 Tracks, before appearing on its namesake album The Promise, released in 2010.

== Certifications ==
Region	Certification	Certified units/sales
Australia (ARIA)	Gold	35,000^{‡}
New Zealand (RMNZ)	Gold	15,000^{‡}
United Kingdom (BPI)	Silver	200,000^{‡}
United States (RIAA)	Platinum	1,000,000^{‡}
^{‡} Sales+streaming figures based on certification alone.
