= Olympiastadion, Helsinki, July 31, 2012 =

Live album by Bruce Springsteen and the E Street Band
- Released: May 23, 2017
- Recorded: July 31, 2012
- Venue: Helsinki Olympic Stadium, Helsinki, Finland
- Genre: Rock
- Producer: John Cooper

Bruce Springsteen and the E Street Band chronology
Scottrade Center, St. Louis, MO, 8/23/08 (2017)	Olympiastadion, Helsinki, July 31, 2012 (2017)	Wachovia Spectrum, Philadelphia, PA 10/20/09 (2017)

Olympiastadion, Helsinki, July 31, 2012 is a live album by Bruce Springsteen and the E Street Band, released on May 23, 2017. It is the thirteenth such release by the Bruce Springsteen Archives. The concert is notable for being, as of the time of its release, the longest by Springsteen and the band, at four hours and six minutes in length. The show also included a brief five-song acoustic set for fans who had arrived early; this is not included on the recording.^{[A]} The concert is the third full-length show from the Wrecking Ball Tour to be released, following Apollo Theater 3/09/12, a rehearsal for the tour, and Ippodromo delle Capannelle, Rome 2013.

== Track listing ==
All songs by Bruce Springsteen, except where noted.

=== Main set ===
1. "Rockin' All Over the World" – 4:43
  - written and originally recorded by John Fogerty
2. "Night" – 3:19
3. "Out in the Street" – 6:26
4. "Loose Ends" – 4:35
5. "Prove It All Night" – 8:35
  - features the long 1978 introduction
6. "We Take Care of Our Own" – 4:32
7. "Wrecking Ball" – 7:09
8. "Death to My Hometown" – 4:51
9. "My City of Ruins" – 18:26
10. "Does This Bus Stop at 82nd Street?" – 6:22
11. "Be True" – 4:34
12. "Jack of All Trades" – 6:46
13. "Downbound Train" – 5:07
14. "Because the Night" – 6:00
15. "Lonesome Day" – 4:33
16. "Darlington County" – 7:48
17. "Light of Day – Land of a Thousand Dances" – 8:20
  - "Land of a Thousand Dances" written and originally recorded by Chris Kenner
18. "Shackled and Drawn" – 8:53
19. "Waitin' on a Sunny Day" – 10:37
20. "Back in Your Arms" – 11:39
21. "The Rising" – 5:11
22. "Badlands" – 6:27
23. "Land of Hope and Dreams" – 14:16

=== Encore ===
1. "We Are Alive" – 6:49
2. "Born in the U.S.A." – 5:20
3. "Born to Run" – 6:22
4. "Detroit Medley" – 6:10
  - Written by Mitch Ryder and recorded by Mitch Ryder and the Detroit Wheels
5. "Glory Days" – 5:36
6. "Dancing in the Dark" – 9:39
7. "Tenth Avenue Freeze-Out" – 11:35
8. "I Don't Want to Go Home" – 5:27
  - written by Steven Van Zandt and recorded by Southside Johnny and the Asbury Jukes
9. "(Your Love Keeps Lifting Me) Higher and Higher – 7:44
  - originally written by Gary Jackson and Carl Smith, and recorded by Jackie Wilson
10. "Twist and Shout" – 12:25
  - written by Phil Medley and Bert Berns and originally recorded by The Top Notes

^{A} The pre-show set included "I'll Work For Your Love", "Leap of Faith", "No Surrender", "For You", and "Blinded by the Light".

== Personnel ==
The E Street Band

- Bruce Springsteen – lead vocals, electric guitar, acoustic guitar, harmonica
- Roy Bittan – piano, electric keyboard, accordion
- Nils Lofgren – electric guitar, acoustic guitar, pedal steel guitar, background vocals
- Garry Tallent – bass guitar
- Steven Van Zandt – electric guitar, mandolin, background vocals
- Max Weinberg – drums

and

- Charlie Giordano – organ, electric keyboards
- Jake Clemons – saxophone, percussion, background vocals
- Soozie Tyrell – violin, acoustic guitar, background vocals

with

- Everett Bradley – percussion, background vocals
- Curtis King – percussion, background vocals
- Cindy Mizelle – background vocals
- Michelle Moore – background vocals
- Barry Danelian – trumpet
- Clark Gayton – trombone
- Eddie Manion – saxophone
- Curt Ramm – trumpet
- Jon Landau – guitar on "(Your Love Keeps Lifting Me) Higher and Higher" and "Twist and Shout"
