= High Hopes Tour =

2014 concert tour by Bruce Springsteen and the E Street Band

- Tour by Bruce Springsteen and the E Street Band
- Associated album: High Hopes
- Start date: January 26, 2014
- End date: May 18, 2014
- Legs: 3
- No. of shows: 34
- Box office: $65 million

Bruce Springsteen and the E Street Band concert chronology
- Wrecking Ball World Tour (2012–13); High Hopes Tour (2014); The River Tour 2016/Summer '17 (2016–17)

The High Hopes Tour was a concert tour by Bruce Springsteen and the E Street Band with special guest guitarist Tom Morello of Rage Against the Machine. The tour was seen as a continuation of his previous tour and was in support of eighteenth studio album, High Hopes, which was released in January 2014.

Longtime E Street Band guitarist Steven Van Zandt missed most of the tour's North American leg due to the filming of his television series, Lilyhammer, while Patti Scialfa appeared on a few North American dates. 182 songs were performed on the High Hopes Tour and Springsteen announced at the tour's conclusion the band would be taking a break for the remainder of the year.

== Background ==
Springsteen's manager, Jon Landau, said in a statement that the band's shows in Australia earlier in 2013 were among the best and most satisfying of the 128-date Wrecking Ball Tour. Landau further stated the 2014 tour had been in the works since the previous Australian leg, in large part due to its success and huge response from younger fans. A goal was to expand the number of places the band performed to include Perth and Adelaide, two places Springsteen had never performed, and Auckland, where Springsteen had not performed in over a decade. During the previous Australian tour, Tom Morello stood in for Steven Van Zandt, who was absent due to filming of his television series, Lilyhammer. Springsteen told Rolling Stone that he had written and recorded a substantial amount of new music with the E Street Band and Morello. That material, along with others, would eventually make up the High Hopes album.

Initial tour dates in Australia and New Zealand were announced on August 15, 2013, with additional dates announced over the ensuing months. Subsequently, on October 28, 2013, Springsteen's management announced additional concerts in South Africa. The tour was the first time Springsteen and the E Street Band played in South Africa; their only prior performances in Africa occurred during the Human Rights Now! Tour in 1988, which visited Zimbabwe and Ivory Coast.

== Itinerary ==
=== Pre-tour promotion/Rehearsals ===
Late Night with Jimmy Fallon dedicated the entire show on January 14, 2014, to Springsteen and the new album. Springsteen and Fallon, who were dressed as Springsteen from the Born in the U.S.A. era, performed a parody song titled "Gov. Christie Traffic Jam" set to the tune of "Born to Run". The parody poked fun at the Fort Lee lane closure scandal. Fallon said he warned Christie about the skit prior to doing it because he knew it could possibly sting a bit. The E Street Band (with Patti Scialfa and minus Van Zandt, who was again filming Lilyhammer), along with Tom Morello, joined Springsteen throughout the show for performances of three songs from the new album. Fallon also interviewed Springsteen.

Rehearsals for the tour began in the U.S. around January 21, 2014, again without Van Zandt, who joined the band in Cape Town for final rehearsals prior to the tour's opening night. Patti Scialfa, who appeared at the U.S. rehearsals, did not tour with the band for the first two legs (Africa and Oceania) due to family commitments but rejoined the tour when it returned to the United States.

=== African leg ===
The tour kicked off on January 26, 2014, with the first of three shows in Cape Town, South Africa. Springsteen opened with a cover of "Free Nelson Mandela" by the Special AKA. "We Are Alive" was also dedicated to Mandela later in the set. During the second show in Cape Town, Springsteen dedicated "We Shall Overcome" to Pete Seeger, who died on January 27 at the age of 94. "I lost a great friend and a great hero last night, Pete Seeger", Springsteen said before introducing the song. The third show featured a cover of "Sun City", an anti-apartheid song written by Van Zandt in 1986 and originally recorded by Artists United Against Apartheid. Springsteen had also appeared in the song's music video. Mos Def made a surprise appearance during the song's performance. Over the course of the three Cape Town shows, 57 different songs were performed. Prior to his show in Johannesburg, Springsteen reprised an occasional practice from past tours and took the stage a few hours prior to showtime to perform a brief acoustic set for early-arriving fans. The supporting act for the Johannesburg concert was South African blues guitarist Dan Patlansky.

=== Oceania leg ===
The Oceanic leg of the tour kicked off in Perth, where Bruce and the band played for the first time ever. The schedule included stops in Adelaide and Hunter Valley, where he also had never played before; and return dates to Melbourne, Sydney and Brisbane. The tour concluded with two shows in Auckland, New Zealand, where Springsteen had not performed in over a decade.

During the run of the leg, several songs from the new album were premiered, including "Frankie Fell in Love" and "Hunter of Invisible Game". "The Wish" was also played for the first time ever at an E Street band show (although performed by Springsteen as an acoustic version). During many shows Bruce would incorporate cover songs from local artists. "Highway to Hell" by AC/DC proved very popular and was played on several occasions; the band was joined by Eddie Vedder twice for that song. Other covers by Australian artists included INXS ("Don't Change"), the Easybeats ("Friday on My Mind"), and the Bee Gees ("Stayin' Alive"). The shows in Hunter Valley took place at the Hope Estate, a local winery. Bruce used the opportunity to bring out some unlikely covers, "Drinkin' Wine, Spo-Dee-O-Dee" by Stick McGhee and "Spill the Wine" by Eric Burdon and War. In Auckland, he opened both shows with a cover of the Lorde song "Royals", his most up-to-date cover ever.

Springsteen reprised the practice of performing full albums in the cities he had been to during the last tour. Born in the U.S.A., Born to Run, Darkness on the Edge of Town and The Wild, the Innocent & the E Street Shuffle were played top to bottom. For the latter one Bruce and the band were joined by the string ensemble Cooper + Koo, who also were on stage during the "Stayin’ Alive" cover.

Other notable shows were the last show in Perth, where Springsteen did not play a single song from The Rising album, something that had not happened since its release in 2002. The show in Brisbane featured eleven songs from the first two albums, something that had never previously happened at a Springsteen show. During the shows in Auckland, Springsteen mentioned Christchurch and the recent happenings several times and dedicated songs on both nights to it.

Jake Clemons was not present at the Sydney show due to the death of his father, Clarence's brother Bill, earlier in the week.

=== North American leg ===
Springsteen and the E Street Band, who would be minus Steven Van Zandt for most of the leg but were re-joined by Patti Scialfa, returned to North America for the first time since December 2012 by kicking off the leg in Dallas, Texas. The show was part of the March Madness Music festival and was free and to open the public, a first in over 40 years for Springsteen. As with the previous legs, Springsteen continued to open with an obscure cover song, this time Van Halen's "Jump", a reference to the NCAA men's basketball tournament's Final Four that was held at AT&T Stadium in Arlington, Texas. Prior to the show in Charlotte, North Carolina, Springsteen shot a music video for the song "American Beauty".

During the North American leg, the E Street Band were inducted into the Rock and Roll Hall of Fame by Springsteen (who was inducted in 1999 as a solo artist) on April 10. Springsteen and E Street Band were joined by former members Vini Lopez and David Sancious for a three-song performance.

== Show downloads ==
Image of the USB wristband that was sold at shows and online

Prior to the tour, Springsteen's management announced a new service allowing fans to download concert recordings approximately 48 hours after each show. The initial plan required fans to purchase a special $40 USB wristband, which could then be used to download a single show of the purchaser's choice. The wristband would also function as a reusable USB flash drive. Following some negative response from fans over the high cost for the wristband, Springsteen's management subsequently announced a separate cheaper option for purchasing shows directly from Springsteen's website as downloads, priced at $9.99 for MP3, and $14.99 for FLAC.

The idea of having wristbands came about through a conversation between Springsteen and Matchbox 20 singer Rob Thomas. Springsteen stated, "I think we live more in a Grateful Dead touring idea that everything you do is recorded now. And that's okay with me, you know. As a matter of fact, I believe on this tour, we're starting to do something like you can come in, you can buy a [wrist]band, you can get a copy of the night's show. So hopefully we're gonna do that at a really nice quality level." "We started out as being very, very controlling. Now it's just a different playing field and so it's exciting." Springsteen said.

Fans had until June 30, 2014, to purchase downloads through Springsteen's website. They would no longer be for sale following that date. All but one show were restored on November 17, 2014, upon the opening of the Bruce Springsteen Archives.

== Ticket scalping ==
As with Springsteen's previous tours, tickets were in high demand among fans, selling out very quickly in some areas despite many fans spending large amounts of time online only to come up with bad seats or without tickets. When tickets for Springsteen's first U.S. dates went on sale on February 14, 2014, Ticketmaster again was faced with major problems and delays. Tickets at much higher costs than face value were even available at re-sale sites such as StubHub before going on sale to the general public. Fans vented their frustration through Springsteen message boards and his Facebook page. Problems also occurred outside the United States. In Australia, fans complained of ticket scalping and scalpers re-selling for high prices. Unlike in the United States, which has admitted and tried to correct problems with scalping, the entertainment and ticketing industry of Australia claims not to have a scalper or ticket sale problem despite many complaints from fans, who blame corporate scalpers being able to find ways to get the better tickets prior to the public sale. When Springsteen first announced the Australian dates in September 2013, Frontier Touring's Michael Gudinski said more dates were being added in response to the inflated tickets flooding eBay, viagogo and other sites. Many of the tickets have been originally secured by "bots" which buy up allotments via official sellers including Ticketek and Ticketmaster. Gudinski also warned fans to not buy from these outlets that re-sell tickets because some might not be real tickets.

== Documentaries ==
On April 4, 2014, HBO aired Bruce Springsteen's High Hopes, a 30-minute documentary on the making of the High Hopes album, which featured footage of the band in the studio recording the album along with rehearsals for the tour. In May 2014, Sony Music Netherlands released a 45-minute documentary to YouTube titled High Hopes In South Africa, which documented Springsteen and the E Street Band's first concerts in South Africa.

== Springsteen's response ==
On May 18, 2014, prior to the tour's final show, Springsteen gave an interview for E Street Radio in which he issued his response on this tour and the previous tour:

"I just wanted to get a chance to thank all of the fans who came to all of the shows. We've had incredible audiences in Europe, South America, Africa, down under in Australia and here in the United States. Our reach has been greater than it's ever been before, the audiences have never been greater, and we're looking forward to nothing but more in the future."

== Set list ==
1. "High Hopes"
2. "Just Like Fire Would"
3. "Hungry Heart"
4. "No Surrender"
5. "Death to My Hometown"
6. "Spirit in the Night"
7. "Badlands"
8. "Wrecking Ball"
9. "The River"
10. "Johnny 99"
11. "The Promised Land"
12. "American Skin (41 Shots)"
13. "Because the Night"
14. "Heaven's Wall"
15. "Darlington County"
16. "Shackled and Drawn"
17. "Waitin' on a Sunny Day"
18. "The Ghost of Tom Joad"
19. "Land of Hope and Dreams"
20. "Light of Day"
21. "The Rising"
22. "Born in the U.S.A."
23. "Bobby Jean"
24. "Born to Run"
25. "Dancing in the Dark"
26. "Tenth Avenue Freeze-Out"
27. "Shout"

Encore

28. "Thunder Road"

== Tour dates ==
List of concerts, showing date, city, country, venue, tickets sold, number of available tickets and amount of gross revenue
Date	City	Country	Venue	Attendance	Revenue
Africa
January 26, 2014	Cape Town	South Africa	Bellville Velodrome	23,973 / 23,973	$1,848,788
January 28, 2014	Cape Town	South Africa	Bellville Velodrome	23,973 / 23,973	$1,848,788
January 29, 2014	Cape Town	South Africa	Bellville Velodrome	23,973 / 23,973	$1,848,788
February 1, 2014	Johannesburg	South Africa	FNB Stadium	55,385 / 55,385	$3,409,720
Oceania
February 5, 2014	Perth	Australia	Perth Arena	41,682 / 41,682	$6,469,241
February 7, 2014	Perth	Australia	Perth Arena	41,682 / 41,682	$6,469,241
February 8, 2014	Perth	Australia	Perth Arena	41,682 / 41,682	$6,469,241
February 11, 2014	Adelaide	Australia	Adelaide Entertainment Center	18,644 / 18,644	$3,007,786
February 12, 2014	Adelaide	Australia	Adelaide Entertainment Center	18,644 / 18,644	$3,007,786
February 15, 2014	Melbourne	Australia	AAMI Park	62,950 / 62,950	$9,185,208
February 16, 2014	Melbourne	Australia	AAMI Park	62,950 / 62,950	$9,185,208
February 19, 2014	Sydney	Australia	Allphones Arena	17,736 / 17,736	$2,693,911
February 22, 2014	Hunter Valley	Australia	Hope Estate Winery	34,338 / 34,338	$5,418,005
February 23, 2014	Hunter Valley	Australia	Hope Estate Winery	34,338 / 34,338	$5,418,005
February 26, 2014	Brisbane	Australia	Brisbane Entertainment Centre	12,648 / 12,648	$1,974,358
March 1, 2014	Auckland	New Zealand	Mount Smart Stadium	73,958 / 73,958	$10,221,082
March 2, 2014	Auckland	New Zealand	Mount Smart Stadium	73,958 / 73,958	$10,221,082
North America
April 6, 2014^{[A]}	Dallas	United States	Reunion Park	—N/a	—N/a
April 8, 2014	Cincinnati	United States	U.S. Bank Arena	12,728 / 14,534	$1,312,323
April 12, 2014	Virginia Beach	United States	Farm Bureau Live	15,157 / 19,501	$1,148,389
April 15, 2014	Columbus	United States	Nationwide Arena	13,226 / 16,547	$1,314,957
April 17, 2014	Nashville	United States	Bridgestone Arena	14,684 / 16,550	$1,229,977
April 19, 2014	Charlotte	United States	Time Warner Cable Arena	12,372 / 13,706	$1,316,489
April 22, 2014	Pittsburgh	United States	Consol Energy Center	16,372 / 17,514	$1,750,727
April 24, 2014	Raleigh	United States	PNC Arena	12,243 / 13,456	$1,348,630
April 26, 2014	Atlanta	United States	Aaron's Amphitheatre	12,193 / 18,658	$1,073,059
April 29, 2014	Sunrise	United States	BB&T Center	14,327 / 18,859	$1,434,757
May 1, 2014	Tampa	United States	MidFlorida Credit Union Amphitheatre	14,207 / 19,128	$1,114,737
May 3, 2014^{[B]}	New Orleans	United States	Fair Grounds Race Course	—N/a	—N/a
May 6, 2014	The Woodlands	United States	Cynthia Woods Mitchell Pavilion	16,158 / 16,158	$1,215,604
May 13, 2014	Albany	United States	Times Union Center	14,937 / 14,937	$1,658,178
May 14, 2014	Hershey	United States	Hersheypark Stadium	28,398 / 30,261	$2,984,798
May 17, 2014	Uncasville	United States	Mohegan Sun Arena	15,716 / 15,716	$1,798,990
May 18, 2014	Uncasville	United States	Mohegan Sun Arena	15,716 / 15,716	$1,798,990
TOTAL				554,032 / 586,839 (94.6%)	$64,929,714

Festivals and other miscellaneous performances

^{A} This concert was part of the "March Madness Music Fest"
^{B} This concert was part of the "New Orleans Jazz & Heritage Festival"

== Songs performed ==
Originals/studio tracks

Greetings from Asbury Park, New Jersey

- "Blinded by the Light"
- "Does This Bus Stop at 82nd Street?"
- "For You" (solo piano)
- "Growin' Up"
- "It's Hard to Be a Saint in the City"
- "Lost in the Flood"
- "Spirit in the Night"

The Wild, the Innocent & the E Street Shuffle

- "4th of July, Asbury Park (Sandy)"
- "The E Street Shuffle"
- "Incident on 57th Street"
- "Kitty's Back"
- "New York City Serenade"
- "Rosalita (Come Out Tonight)"
- "Wild Billy's Circus Story"

Born to Run

- "Backstreets"
- "Born to Run"
- "Jungleland"
- "Meeting Across the River"
- "Night"
- "She's the One"
- "Tenth Avenue Freeze-Out"
- "Thunder Road"

Darkness on the Edge of Town

- "Adam Raised a Cain"
- "Badlands"
- "Candy's Room"
- "Darkness on the Edge of Town"
- "Factory"
- "The Promised Land"
- "Prove It All Night"
- "Racing in the Street"
- "Something in the Night"
- "Streets of Fire"

The River

- "Cadillac Ranch"
- "Drive All Night"
- "Fade Away"
- "Hungry Heart"
- "I Wanna Marry You"
- "I'm a Rocker"
- "Independence Day" (solo piano)
- "Jackson Cage"
- "Out in the Street"
- "Point Blank"
- "The Price You Pay"
- "Ramrod"
- "The River"
- "Sherry Darling"
- "The Ties That Bind"
- "Two Hearts"
- "You Can Look (But You Better Not Touch)"

Nebraska

- "Atlantic City"
- "Johnny 99"
- "Open All Night"

Born in the U.S.A.

- "Bobby Jean"
- "Born in the U.S.A."
- "Cover Me"
- "Dancing in the Dark"
- "Darlington County"
- "Downbound Train"
- "Glory Days"
- "I'm Goin' Down"
- "I'm on Fire"
- "My Hometown"
- "No Surrender"
- "Working on the Highway"

Live/1975–85

- "Jersey Girl" (originally performed by Tom Waits)
- "Seeds"

Tunnel of Love

- "Brilliant Disguise"
- "One Step Up"
- "Tougher Than the Rest"

Human Touch

- "All or Nothin' at All"
- "Human Touch"
- "I Wish I Were Blind" (solo acoustic)
- "Roll of the Dice"

Lucky Town

- "Better Days"
- "If I Should Fall Behind" (solo acoustic)
- "Leap of Faith"
- "Lucky Town"

In Concert/MTV Plugged

- "Light of Day"

Greatest Hits

- "Murder Incorporated"
- "This Hard Land" (solo acoustic)

The Ghost of Tom Joad

- "The Ghost of Tom Joad"
- "Youngstown"

Tracks

- "Back in Your Arms"
- "Be True"
- "Brothers Under the Bridge" (solo acoustic)
- "Don't Look Back"
- "Frankie"
- "Hearts of Stone"
- "I Wanna Be With You"
- "Iceman"
- "Linda Let Me Be the One"
- "Loose Ends"
- "My Love Will Not Let You Down"
- "Roulette"
- "Seaside Bar Song"
- "Seven Angels"
- "Stand on It"
- "The Wish" (solo acoustic)

The Rising

- "Lonesome Day"
- "Mary's Place"
- "My City of Ruins"
- "The Rising"
- "Waitin' on a Sunny Day"

The Essential Bruce Springsteen

- "From Small Things (Big Things One Day Come)

We Shall Overcome: The Seeger Sessions

- "How Can a Poor Man Stand Such Times and Live?"
- "Jesse James"
- "O Mary Don't You Weep"
- "Pay Me My Money Down"
- "We Shall Overcome"

Live in Dublin

- "When the Saints Go Marching In"

Magic

- "Girls in Their Summer Clothes" (solo acoustic)
- "I'll Work For Your Love" (solo acoustic)
- "Long Walk Home"
- "Radio Nowhere"
- "Terry's Song" (solo acoustic)

Working on a Dream

- "Kingdom of Days" (solo acoustic)
- "Surprise, Surprise" (solo acoustic)

The Promise

- "Because the Night"
- "The Promise" (solo piano)
- "Racing in the Street '78"
- "Save My Love"
- "Talk to Me"

Wrecking Ball

- "American Land"
- "Death to My Hometown"
- "Jack of All Trades"
- "Land of Hope and Dreams"
- "Rocky Ground"
- "Shackled and Drawn"
- "We Are Alive"
- "We Take Care of Our Own"
- "Wrecking Ball"

High Hopes

- "American Skin (41 Shots)"
- "Dream Baby Dream" (originally performed by Suicide)
- "Frankie Fell in Love"
- "Heaven's Wall"
- "High Hopes" (originally performed by The Havalinas)
- "Hunter of Invisible Game"
- "Just Like Fire Would" (originally performed by The Saints)
- "This Is Your Sword"
- "The Wall"

Other/non-album tracks'

- "Jole Blon" (traditional Cajun waltz - outtake from The River sessions)

Non-album cover songs

- "Brown Eyed Girl"
- "Boom Boom"
- "Burning Love"
- "Clampdown"
- "Detroit Medley"
- "Don't Change"
- "Drinkin' Wine, Spo-Dee-O-Dee"
- "Free Nelson Mandela"
- "Friday on My Mind"
- "Gloria"
- "Great Balls of Fire"
- "Green River"
- "Highway to Hell"
- "(Love Is Like a) Heat Wave"
- "Joe Hill"
- "Jump"
- "Louie Louie"
- "Lucille"
- "May I"
- "Mustang Sally"
- "Not Fade Away" (intro to "She's the One")
- "Pretty Flamingo"
- "Proud Mary"
- "Quarter to Three"
- "Raise Your Hand"
- "Rockin' All Over the World"
- "Royals" (solo acoustic version)
- "Santa Claus is Comin' to Town"
- "(I Can't Get No) Satisfaction"
- "Save the Last Dance For Me"
- "Seven Nights to Rock"
- "Shout"
- "Spill the Wine"
- "Stayin' Alive"
- "Summertime Blues"
- "Sun City"
- "This Little Light of Mine"
- "Trapped"
- "Treat Her Right".
- "Twist and Shout"
- "Who'll Stop the Rain"

== Supporting acts ==
- Dan Patlansky (Johannesburg)
- Hunters & Collectors (Melbourne)
- The Rubens (Hunter Valley)
- Dan Sultan (Melbourne & Hunter Valley)
- Jimmy Barnes (Auckland)

== Personnel ==
=== The E Street Band ===
- Bruce Springsteen — lead vocals, lead guitar, rhythm guitar, acoustic guitar, harmonica, piano
- Roy Bittan — piano, synthesizer, accordion
- Nils Lofgren — rhythm guitar, lead guitar, pedal steel guitar, acoustic guitar, accordion, background vocals
- Patti Scialfa - background vocals, some duet vocals, acoustic guitar, occasional tambourine (missed first two legs due to family commitments, appearing on select North American dates)
- Garry Tallent — bass guitar, background vocals, rare tuba
- Steven Van Zandt — rhythm guitar, lead guitar, mandolin, acoustic guitar, background vocals, occasional featured lead vocal (missed all but the final two dates on the North American tour due to filming of his television show)
- Max Weinberg — drums, rare tambourine

and

- Soozie Tyrell — violin, acoustic guitar, percussion, background vocals
- Charles Giordano — organ, accordion, electronic glockenspiel, rare piano, occasional background vocals

with

- Tom Morello — lead guitar, rhythm guitar, backing vocals, lead vocals (on "The Ghost of Tom Joad")

The E Street Horns:

- Jake Clemons — saxophone, percussion, background vocals
- Barry Danielian — trumpet, percussion
- Clark Gayton — trombone, tuba, percussion
- Eddie Manion — saxophone, percussion
- Curt Ramm — trumpet, percussion

The E Street Choir:

- Curtis King Jr. — background vocals, tambourine, occasional featured lead vocal (on "Free Nelson Mandela" and "This Little Light of Mine")
- Cindy Mizelle — background vocals, tambourine, featured vocal on "Shackled and Drawn"
- Michelle Moore — background vocals, rapping on Rocky Ground
- Everett Bradley — percussion, background vocals

=== Guest musicians/appearances ===
- Mos Def (January 29, 2014)
- Jon Landau (February 11, 2014)
- Eddie Vedder (February 15 and 26, 2014)
- Cooper + Koo (February 26, 2014)
- Vini Lopez (April 10, 2014)
- David Sancious (April 10, 2014)
- Joe Grushecky (April 22, 2014)
- Jessica Springsteen (April 6 and 24, 2014)
- Rickie Lee Jones (May 3, 2014)
- John Fogerty (May 3, 2014)
- Joe Ely (May 6, 2014)
