= Apollo Theater 3/09/12 =

Apollo Theater 03/09/12

Live album by Bruce Springsteen & the E Street Band
- Released: November 17, 2014
- Recorded: March 9, 2012
- Venue: Apollo Theater
- Genre: Rock
- Length: 2:11:41

Bruce Springsteen & the E Street Band chronology
The Album Collection Vol. 1 1973–1984 (2014)	Apollo Theater 03/09/12 (2014)	The Agora, Cleveland 1978 (2014)

Apollo Theater 03/09/12 is a live album by Bruce Springsteen & the E Street Band, released in November 2014 and was the first official release through the Bruce Springsteen Archives. The concert is available on CD and digital download.

== Background ==
The show was recorded at the Apollo Theater in New York City on March 9, 2012, and was a warm-up date for the band's upcoming Wrecking Ball World Tour. The show also marked the first full performance for Springsteen and the E Street Band following the death of Clarence Clemons, and the first to feature the newly assembled nine-piece backing band that Springsteen would use on his upcoming tours. The performance aired live on E Street Radio.

== Track listing ==
All tracks by Bruce Springsteen, except where noted.

=== Set one ===
1. "Opening Applause" – 1:09
2. "Bruce Introduction" – 1:07
3. "We Take Care of Our Own" – 4:28
4. "Wrecking Ball" – 6:07
5. "Badlands" – 5:56
6. "Death to My Hometown" – 4:09
7. "My City of Ruins" – 12:18
8. "Talking intro to "The E Street Shuffle" – 0:47
9. "The E Street Shuffle" – 7:52
10. "Jack Of All Trades" – 6:13
11. "Shackled and Drawn" – 6:23
12. "Waitin' on a Sunny Day" – 5:27
13. "The Promised Land" – 6:24
14. "Talking intro to "Mansion on the Hill" – 1:33
15. "Mansion on the Hill" – 4:28
16. "Intro to "The Way You Do the Things You Do/634-5789" – 3:31
17. "The Way You Do the Things You Do/634-5789" – 8:10 (Robinson; Wilson Pickett)
  - Contains portions of "The Way You Do the Things You Do" Originally Recorded by The Temptations
18. "The Rising" – 5:10
19. "We Are Alive" – 6:07
20. "Thunder Road" – 7:12
21. "Talking intro to "Rocky Ground" – 1:16

=== Encore ===
1. "Rocky Ground" – 6:40
2. "Land of Hope and Dreams/People Get Ready" – 8:59 (Springsteen; Mayfield)
  - Contains portions of "People Get Ready" originally by The Impressions
3. "Tenth Avenue Freeze-Out" – 6:33
4. "Hold On, I'm Comin'" – 3:43 (Hayes, Porter)
  - Originally Recorded by Sam & Dave

== Personnel ==
- Bruce Springsteen – guitar, vocals, harmonica
- Nils Lofgren – guitar, pedal steel guitar, acoustic guitar, background vocals
- Patti Scialfa – background vocals, acoustic guitar, tambourine
- Roy Bittan – piano, synthesizer, backing vocals
- Garry Tallent – bass guitar
- Steven Van Zandt – guitar, slide guitar, backing vocals
- Max Weinberg – drums
- Soozie Tyrell – violin, acoustic guitar, percussion, background vocals
- Charles Giordano – accordion, keyboards
- Jake Clemons – saxophone, percussion, background vocals
- Eddie Manion – saxophone, percussion
- Curt Ramm – trumpet, percussion
- Barry Danielian – trumpet, percussion
- Clark Gayton – trombone, tuba, percussion
- Curtis King – background vocals, tambourine
- Cindy Mizelle – background vocals, tambourine
- Michelle Moore – background vocals, rapping on "Rocky Ground"
- Everett Bradley – percussion, background vocals
- Bob Clearmountain – mixer
- Bob Ludwig – mastering
