= Wrecking Ball World Tour =

2012–13 concert tour by Bruce Springsteen and the E Street Band

- Tour by Bruce Springsteen and the E Street Band
- Associated album: Wrecking Ball
- Start date: March 18, 2012
- End date: September 21, 2013
- Legs: 5
- No. of shows: 134
- Box office: $340.6 million ($491.49 million in 2025 dollars)

Bruce Springsteen and the E Street Band concert chronology
- Working on a Dream Tour (2009); Wrecking Ball World Tour (2012–13); High Hopes Tour (2014)

The Wrecking Ball World Tour was a concert tour by Bruce Springsteen and the E Street Band to promote Springsteen's seventeenth studio album, Wrecking Ball, which was released on March 5, 2012. It was the first tour for the E Street Band without founding member Clarence Clemons, who died on June 18, 2011. The worldwide tour in support of the album, which ended in September 2013, reached 26 countries, the most ever for a Springsteen tour. The tour resumed in January 2014 to promote Springsteen's new album, High Hopes, and went under that album's name.

In an attempt to fill the void left by Clemons, Springsteen added a full horn section, which included Jake Clemons, Clarence's nephew. Three background singers and a percussionist were also added, giving the E Street Band its largest lineup ever at seventeen members. As with previous tours, Springsteen's wife and band member, Patti Scialfa, did not appear at all the shows due to family commitments. Guitarist Steven Van Zandt was also unable to perform on the band's Australian leg due to the filming of his television show, Lilyhammer. Van Zandt was replaced by Tom Morello for those dates.

The tour featured over 215 different songs performed, including some songs either making their live debuts or returning after an extended absence.

The tour was named the second highest-grossing tour of 2012 and was the most attended tour of the year, winning the Billboard Touring Award for Top Draw. For the first half of 2013, the tour was named one of the top three grossing tours for the year.

At the end of 2012, the tour placed second on Pollstar's "Top 100 Worldwide Tours", grossing $210.2 million from 81 shows in Europe. At the end of 2013, the tour placed fifth on Pollstar's "Top 100 Worldwide Tours", grossing $145.4 million from 46 shows in Europe. Overall, the tour grossed $340.6 million from 124 shows. The tour was Springsteen and the E Street Band's highest grossing tour until the 2023–2025 Tour.

== Itinerary ==
=== Planning and rehearsals ===
Private rehearsals started in late January 2012 at the Expo Theater in Fort Monmouth, New Jersey, the same site where rehearsals were held for the Tunnel of Love Express Tour and the Rising Tour. Some rehearsals were held at the Sun National Bank Center in Trenton to allow the band and crew to try a new stage design.

It was announced on February 9, 2012, that Eddie Manion and Clarence Clemons's nephew, Jake Clemons, would share saxophone duties with Clemons handling most of the lead solos. Additional horns were provided by Clark Gayton, Curt Ramm, and Barry Danielian. Everett Bradly provided percussion and backing vocals while Curtis King Jr. and Cindy Mizelle returned as background singers. Michelle Moore joined the tour as a background singer featuring on Rocky Ground for the rap (as on the album).

In advance of the album's release on March 5, 2012, the band kicked off a string of warm-up performances prior to the tour, including a performance of the album's first single, "We Take Care of Our Own", at the 54th Grammy Awards. During the final week of February, talk show host Jimmy Fallon dedicated an entire week of his show, Late Night with Jimmy Fallon, to Springsteen's music. Different artists covered Springsteen's songs each night of that week.

The new touring lineup performed their first full show together on March 9, 2012, at the Apollo Theater. Springsteen then gave a keynote speech at the SXSW convention in Austin, Texas, on March 15, 2012, and was joined later in the evening by the E Street Band for a 2 1/2-hour set before a crowd of a few thousand.

=== Ticket sales ===
On January 26, 2012, dates for the first U.S. leg of the Wrecking Ball world tour were announced to the public, with many going on sale during the first weekend of February.

Much like with the previous tour, many U.S. fans encountered problems, thought to be due to ticket scalpers, through Ticketmaster as the first dates of the tour went on sale. Shows were selling out within minutes and many tickets appeared, at much higher prices, on resale websites such as StubHub less than an hour after the onsale time. Ticketmaster said web traffic was 2.5 times the highest level of the past year during the online sales. U.S. Representative Bill Pascrell, who introduced the BOSS ACT in 2009 to increase transparency in the ticket industry, said he would reintroduce the bill in Congress.

== The show ==
The world tour began on March 18, 2012, in Atlanta. The early shows established a routine of using "Tenth Avenue Freeze-Out", performed as the show closer, as a tribute song to Clarence Clemons. Following the lyric the Big Man joined the band, Springsteen paused the song so the band and audience could pay tribute to Clemons, following which the band resumed the remainder of the song. "My City of Ruins" was used as the band introduction song and frequently included a Springsteen rap about "ghosts", referring to Clemons and Danny Federici, the long-time E Street Band organist who died during the Magic Tour in April 2008. For cities that had more than one consecutive show, American Land was used as the show closer, with the entire band on the front line and finishing the show on the main center platform.

Per Springsteen's standard practice, the set list varied from night to night, sometimes significantly. The tour saw the revival of a number of long-absent aspects of Springsteen's concerts, such as the return (during some shows) of a lengthy instrumental introduction to "Prove It All Night" that fans had unsuccessfully requested during the "sign request" (also sometimes known as "Stump the Band") segments during the Magic and Working on a Dream Tours. The instrumental introduction had been a noted point of 1978's Darkness Tour show but had not been played since. Shows were longer than on recent tours, culminating in Helsinki on July 31, 2012, with the longest performance of Springsteen's career at 4 hours and 6 minutes. Earlier the same night, prior to the show proper, Springsteen had performed a five-song acoustic set for early arrivals.

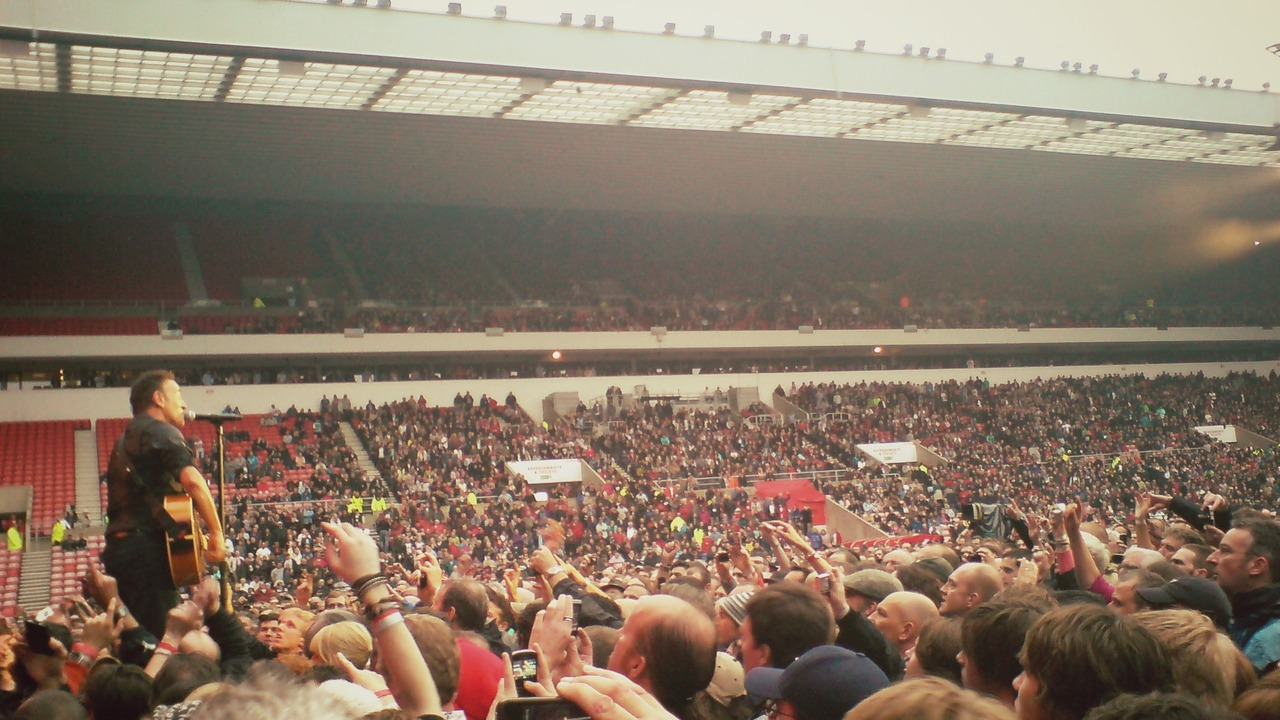
Springsteen playing at the Stadium of Light, Sunderland, UK, June 21, 2012

During the encore of Springsteen's show in London at the Hard Rock Calling festival, the city council pulled the plug on his performance because he ran a few minutes past the show's 10:30 pm curfew. Springsteen was performing "I Saw Her Standing There" and "Twist and Shout" with Paul McCartney when their microphones and instruments were shut off. Springsteen ended the set with a brief a cappella, unamplified version of "Goodnight Irene." The incident resulted in the show being the lone concert on the tour at which "Tenth Avenue Freeze-Out", with its Clarence Clemons tribute, was not performed. Following the performance, Steve Van Zandt took to Twitter and said, "English cops may be the only individuals left on earth that wouldn't want to hear one more from Bruce Springsteen and Paul McCartney!" and followed that up with "There's no grudges to be held. Just feel bad for our great fans. Hard Rock is cool. Live Nation is cool. It's some City Council stupid rule." When Springsteen next performed three nights later in Ireland, he poked fun at the London incident. During "Dancing in the Dark" the big screens by the stage displayed only a battery switched "On." A fake policeman came out to the stage to stop them playing "Twist and Shout" but Springsteen refused. While playing American Land, the fake policeman pulled the plug, but Van Zandt plugged it back in.

The tour returned to the United States in August 2012 and focused on baseball and football stadiums. The tour's third and final show at MetLife Stadium on September 22, 2012, was delayed for two hours due to a strong thunderstorm. The show finally got underway around 10:30 pm, prompting fans to sing "Happy Birthday" to Springsteen at midnight to celebrate his 63rd birthday. At the end of the show, Springsteen was presented with a guitar-shaped birthday cake onstage.

On October 29, 2012, the New Jersey area was hit hard by Hurricane Sandy. Springsteen's show in Rochester, New York, the following day was forced to be postponed until October 31, 2012. That night, Springsteen dedicated his performance to those affected by the storm and those helping to recover. Springsteen and the E Street Band performed "Land of Hope and Dreams" during a one-hour televised telethon called Hurricane Sandy: Coming Together on November 2, 2012. Springsteen also joined Billy Joel, Steven Tyler and Jimmy Fallon for a performance of "Under the Boardwalk". He later participated in the 12-12-12: The Concert for Sandy Relief at Madison Square Garden, a benefit concert for Sandy victims.

Due to filming of his television show, Lilyhammer, Steven Van Zandt was forced to miss the Australian leg of the tour in 2013. Tom Morello replaced Van Zandt for those dates. Van Zandt made his return in late April 2013 when he opened the first of the band's two shows in Oslo, Norway, by singing Frank Sinatra's "My Kind of Town" in character as Frank "the fixer" Tagliano from Lilyhammer. As with 2009's Working on a Dream Tour, some shows featured full-album performances of Born to Run, Darkness on the Edge of Town, and Born in the U.S.A. The European leg ended in late July 2013.

The final leg of the tour took place in September 2013 with Springsteen's first-ever show in Santiago, Chile, on September 12. The tour subsequently featured dates in Argentina and Brazil, with the final show at the Rock in Rio festival on September 21. The show, which was held at Cidade do Rock, was broadcast live on cable in Brazil and over the Internet via YouTube. In the concerts in Brazil, Springsteen performed a cover of "Sociedade Alternativa" by Raul Seixas in addition to his usual setlist.

== Critical and commercial reception ==
The tour was a commercial success and was named the second highest-grossing tour of 2012, finishing behind Madonna, and was the most attended tour of the year, winning the Billboard Touring Award for Top Draw. It was also named the 21st highest-grossing tour worldwide as of December 2012. In July 2013, the tour was named one of the top three grossing tours for the first half of 2013, along with tours by Bon Jovi, who had grossed the highest so far, and the Rolling Stones.

Springsteen was named the #1 musical act by Rolling Stone magazine in their August 2013 issue.

== Aftermath and Springsteen's response ==
During the tour, Springsteen felt inspired to start working on his eighteenth studio album, which eventually became High Hopes. The album was recorded in 2013 during breaks in the Wrecking Ball Tour and was released in January 2014. Springsteen cited Morello, who helped re-introduce some previously recorded songs and cover songs to the recording sessions and live shows, as a huge inspiration on the album.

== Broadcasts and recordings ==
A number of the festival dates performed on the tour had excerpts from the performance broadcast on television. Additionally, 45 minutes of the 2012 Hyde Park show in London was released as a bonus feature on the Springsteen & I DVD release.

Coinciding with the Born in the U.S.A. album's 30th anniversary, Born in the U.S.A. Live: London 2013, a live DVD of the full performance of the album recorded at the 2013 Hard Rock Calling festival, was released through Amazon.com as part of a deluxe edition of the High Hopes album.

Several shows were released as part of the Bruce Springsteen Archives:

- Apollo Theater 3/09/12 released on November 17, 2014
- Ippodromo delle Capannelle, Rome 2013 released on November 11, 2015
- Olympiastadion, Helsinki July 31, 2012 released on May 23, 2017
- Leeds July 24, 2013 released on November 9, 2018
- East Rutherford, NJ 09.22.12 released on June 7, 2019
- Gothenburg July 28, 2012 released on April 3, 2020
- St. Paul November 12, 2012 released on January 8, 2021
- Fenway Park August 15, 2012 released on August 6, 2021
- Paris July 4 and Paris July 5, 2012 released on July 1, 2022
- Cardiff, July 23, 2013 released on January 12, 2024
- Omaha, NE Nov 15, 2012 released on March 7, 2025
- Turku, FI 2013 released on December 5, 2025

== Set list ==
1. "We Take Care of Our Own"
2. "Wrecking Ball"
3. "Death to My Hometown"
4. "My City of Ruins"
5. "Spirit in the Night"
6. "Out in the Street"
7. "Hungry Heart"
8. "Prove It All Night"
9. "Jack of All Trades"
10. "The Promised Land"
11. "Badlands"
12. "She's the One"
13. "Working on the Highway"
14. "Because the Night"
15. "Darlington County"
16. "The River"
17. "Shackled and Drawn"
18. "Waitin' on a Sunny Day"
19. "The Rising"
20. "Land of Hope and Dreams"
21. "Thunder Road"

Encore

22. "We Are Alive"
23. "Rocky Ground"
24. "Born in the U.S.A."
25. "Born to Run"
26. "Dancing in the Dark"
27. "Tenth Avenue Freeze-Out"
28. "Twist and Shout" (The Top Notes cover)

== Tour dates ==
List of concerts, showing date, city, country, venue, tickets sold, number of available tickets and amount of gross revenue
Date	City	Country	Venue	Attendance	Revenue
North America
March 18, 2012	Atlanta	United States	Philips Arena	14,959 / 17,700	$1,382,345
March 19, 2012	Greensboro	United States	Greensboro Coliseum	12,919 / 15,400	$1,169,147
March 23, 2012	Tampa	United States	Tampa Bay Times Forum	16,615 / 18,987	$1,463,180
March 26, 2012	Boston	United States	TD Garden	16,779 / 16,779	$1,577,847
March 28, 2012	Philadelphia	United States	Wells Fargo Center	38,034 / 38,034	$3,647,374
March 29, 2012	Philadelphia	United States	Wells Fargo Center	38,034 / 38,034	$3,647,374
April 1, 2012	Washington, D.C.	United States	Verizon Center	17,699 / 17,699	$1,692,142
April 3, 2012	East Rutherford	United States	Izod Center	38,068 / 38,068	$3,663,374
April 4, 2012	East Rutherford	United States	Izod Center	38,068 / 38,068	$3,663,374
April 6, 2012	New York City	United States	Madison Square Garden	38,828 / 38,828	$3,524,874
April 9, 2012	New York City	United States	Madison Square Garden	38,828 / 38,828	$3,524,874
April 12, 2012	Auburn Hills	United States	The Palace of Auburn Hills	15,607 / 15,607	$1,272,044
April 13, 2012	Buffalo	United States	First Niagara Center	18,344 / 18,344	$1,508,680
April 16, 2012	Albany	United States	Times Union Center	14,962 / 14,962	$1,401,386
April 17, 2012	Cleveland	United States	Quicken Loans Arena	18,624 / 18,624	$1,565,518
April 24, 2012	San Jose	United States	HP Pavilion	15,716 / 17,170	$1,515,818
April 26, 2012	Los Angeles	United States	Los Angeles Sports Arena	32,758 / 32,758	$3,051,752
April 27, 2012	Los Angeles	United States	Los Angeles Sports Arena	32,758 / 32,758	$3,051,752
April 29, 2012 (Note: The April 29, 2012, concert in New Orleans at the Fair Grounds Race course was a part of the New Orleans Jazz & Heritage Festival.)	New Orleans	United States	Fair Grounds Race Course	—N/a	—N/a
May 2, 2012	Newark	United States	Prudential Center	16,934 / 16,934	$1,516,758
Europe
May 13, 2012	Seville	Spain	Estadio Olímpico	22,045 / 30,785	$1,798,678
May 15, 2012	Las Palmas	Spain	Estadio Gran Canaria	23,908 / 30,000	$1,861,267
May 17, 2012	Barcelona	Spain	Estadi Olímpic	79,430 / 86,000	$6,692,818
May 18, 2012	Barcelona	Spain	Estadi Olímpic	79,430 / 86,000	$6,692,818
May 25, 2012	Frankfurt	Germany	Commerzbank-Arena	40,219 / 40,219	$3,759,361
May 27, 2012	Cologne	Germany	RheinEnergieStadion	40,417 / 40,417	$3,786,222
May 28, 2012 (Note: The May 28, 2012, concert in Landgraaf at the Megaland Landgraaf was a part of the Pinkpop Festival.)	Landgraaf	Netherlands	Megaland Landgraaf	—N/a	—N/a
May 30, 2012	Berlin	Germany	Olympiastadion	55,491 / 55,491	$4,514,798
June 2, 2012	San Sebastián	Spain	Estadio Anoeta	45,442 / 45,442	$4,068,870
June 3, 2012 (Note: The June 3, 2012, concert in Lisbon, Portugal, at the Parque Bela Vista was a part of the Rock in Rio Festival.)	Lisbon	Portugal	Parque Bela Vista	—N/a	—N/a
June 7, 2012	Milan	Italy	Stadio San Siro	57,149 / 57,149	$3,855,255
June 10, 2012	Florence	Italy	Stadio Artemio Franchi	42,658 / 42,658	$2,840,374
June 11, 2012	Trieste	Italy	Stadio Nereo Rocco	28,109 / 28,109	$2,232,817
June 17, 2012	Madrid	Spain	Estadio Santiago Bernabéu	54,639 / 54,639	$4,971,750
June 19, 2012	Montpellier	France	Park&Suites Arena	13,289 / 13,289	$1,301,350
June 21, 2012	Sunderland	England	Stadium of Light	41,564 / 52,900	$3,693,333
June 22, 2012	Manchester	England	City of Manchester Stadium	52,546 / 52,546	$4,601,284
June 24, 2012 (Note: The June 24, 2012, concert in Isle of Wight at the Seaclose Park was a part of the Isle of Wight Festival.)	Isle of Wight	England	Seaclose Park	—N/a	—N/a
July 4, 2012	Paris	France	Bercy Arena	33,224 / 33,224	$3,259,155
July 5, 2012	Paris	France	Bercy Arena	33,224 / 33,224	$3,259,155
July 7, 2012 (Note: The July 7, 2012, concert in Roskilde, Denmark at the Dyrskuepladen was a part of the Roskilde Festival.)	Roskilde	Denmark	Roskilde Festival	—N/a	—N/a
July 9, 2012	Zürich	Switzerland	Stadion Letzigrund	41,560 / 41,560	$5,193,564
July 11, 2012	Prague	Czech Republic	Synot Tip Arena	22,200 / 22,200	$1,639,087
July 12, 2012	Vienna	Austria	Ernst Happel Stadion	50,293 / 50,293	$4,502,648
July 14, 2012 (Note: The July 14, 2012, concert in London at Hyde Park was a part of Hard Rock Calling.)	London	England	Hyde Park	—N/a	—N/a
July 17, 2012	Dublin	Ireland	RDS Stadium	76,000 / 76,000	$7,610,327
July 18, 2012	Dublin	Ireland	RDS Stadium	76,000 / 76,000	$7,610,327
July 21, 2012	Oslo	Norway	Stadion Valle Hovin	39,984 / 39,984	$4,874,294
July 23, 2012	Bergen	Norway	Koengen Park	44,068 / 44,068	$5,353,738
July 24, 2012	Bergen	Norway	Koengen Park	44,068 / 44,068	$5,353,738
July 27, 2012	Gothenburg	Sweden	Ullevi Stadion	131,606 / 131,606	$11,968,672
July 28, 2012	Gothenburg	Sweden	Ullevi Stadion	131,606 / 131,606	$11,968,672
July 31, 2012	Helsinki	Finland	Olympic Stadium	43,534 / 43,534	$3,988,494
North America
August 14, 2012	Boston	United States	Fenway Park	59,644 / 59,644	$5,646,102
August 15, 2012	Boston	United States	Fenway Park	59,644 / 59,644	$5,646,102
August 18, 2012	Foxborough	United States	Gillette Stadium	49,621 / 50,000	$4,548,896
August 24, 2012	Toronto	Canada	Rogers Centre	38,986 / 40,000	$3,672,176
August 26, 2012	Moncton	Canada	Magnetic Park	30,200 / 30,200	$3,400,901
August 29, 2012	Vernon	United States	Vernon Downs Raceway	15,595 / 20,000	$1,475,410
September 2, 2012	Philadelphia	United States	Citizens Bank Park	73,296 / 78,200	$6,644,578
September 3, 2012	Philadelphia	United States	Citizens Bank Park	73,296 / 78,200	$6,644,578
September 7, 2012	Chicago	United States	Wrigley Field	84,218 / 84,218	$7,090,141
September 8, 2012	Chicago	United States	Wrigley Field	84,218 / 84,218	$7,090,141
September 14, 2012	Washington, D.C.	United States	Nationals Park	36,525 / 36,525	$3,305,920
September 19, 2012	East Rutherford	United States	MetLife Stadium	152,290 / 159,000	$14,409,760
September 21, 2012	East Rutherford	United States	MetLife Stadium	152,290 / 159,000	$14,409,760
September 22, 2012	East Rutherford	United States	MetLife Stadium	152,290 / 159,000	$14,409,760
October 19, 2012	Ottawa	Canada	Scotiabank Place	16,271 / 16,271	$1,678,662
October 21, 2012	Hamilton	Canada	Copps Coliseum	16,115 / 18,238	$1,764,732
October 23, 2012	Charlottesville	United States	John Paul Jones Arena	9,931 / 13,000	$921,996
October 25, 2012	Hartford	United States	XL Center	14,042 / 15,800	$1,329,751
October 27, 2012	Pittsburgh	United States	Consol Energy Center	17,956 / 17,956	$1,692,278
October 31, 2012 (Note: The October 31, 2012, concert in Rochester, New York, at the Blue Cross Arena was originally planned to take place on October 30 but was rescheduled due to Hurricane Sandy.)	Rochester	United States	Blue Cross Arena	10,405 / 12,323	$1,008,272
November 1, 2012	University Park	United States	Bryce Jordan Center	12,078 / 15,458	$1,220,555
November 3, 2012	Louisville	United States	KFC Yum! Center	16,699 / 20,491	$1,394,816
November 11, 2012	St. Paul	United States	Xcel Energy Center	28,228 / 28,228	$2,708,266
November 12, 2012	St. Paul	United States	Xcel Energy Center	28,228 / 28,228	$2,708,266
November 15, 2012	Omaha	United States	CenturyLink Center Omaha	10,269 / 10,269	$947,630
November 17, 2012	Kansas City	United States	Sprint Center	13,875 / 13,875	$1,094,111
November 19, 2012	Denver	United States	Pepsi Center	14,027 / 17,260	$1,284,576
November 26, 2012	Vancouver	Canada	Rogers Arena	17,009 / 17,009	$1,824,330
November 28, 2012	Portland	United States	Rose Garden Arena	13,790 / 14,798	$1,260,800
November 30, 2012	Oakland	United States	Oracle Arena	16,268 / 17,400	$1,499,818
December 4, 2012	Anaheim	United States	Honda Center	13,743 / 13,800	$1,279,194
December 6, 2012	Glendale	United States	Jobing.com Arena	12,660 / 12,660	$1,197,272
December 10, 2012	Mexico City	Mexico	Palacio de los Deportes	7,690 / 12,000	$366,479
December 12, 2012 (Note: The December 12, 2012, concert in New York at Madison Square Garden was a part of the nl:12-12-12 The Concert for Sandy Relief.)	New York City	United States	Madison Square Garden	—N/a	—N/a
Oceania
March 14, 2013	Brisbane	Australia	Entertainment Centre	24,493 / 24,493	$4,289,920
March 16, 2013	Brisbane	Australia	Entertainment Centre	24,493 / 24,493	$4,289,920
March 18, 2013	Sydney	Australia	Allphones Arena	47,796 / 48,000	$7,966,677
March 20, 2013	Sydney	Australia	Allphones Arena	47,796 / 48,000	$7,966,677
March 22, 2013	Sydney	Australia	Allphones Arena	47,796 / 48,000	$7,966,677
March 24, 2013	Melbourne	Australia	Rod Laver Arena	46,740 / 46,740	$7,662,705
March 26, 2013	Melbourne	Australia	Rod Laver Arena	46,740 / 46,740	$7,662,705
March 27, 2013	Melbourne	Australia	Rod Laver Arena	46,740 / 46,740	$7,662,705
March 30, 2013	Macedon	Australia	Hanging Rock	34,142 / 34,142	$5,395,624
March 31, 2013	Macedon	Australia	Hanging Rock	34,142 / 34,142	$5,395,624
Europe
April 29, 2013	Bærum	Norway	Telenor Arena	43,918 / 43,918	$5,836,045
April 30, 2013	Bærum	Norway	Telenor Arena	43,918 / 43,918	$5,836,045
May 3, 2013	Stockholm	Sweden	Friends Arena	169,325 / 169,325	$17,932,099
May 4, 2013	Stockholm	Sweden	Friends Arena	169,325 / 169,325	$17,932,099
May 7, 2013	Turku	Finland	HK Arena	18,558 / 18,558	$2,382,847
May 8, 2013	Turku	Finland	HK Arena	18,558 / 18,558	$2,382,847
May 11, 2013	Stockholm	Sweden	Friends Arena	(Note: The score data is representative of the three shows at the Friends Arena on May 3, 4, and 11 respectively.)	
May 14, 2013	Copenhagen	Denmark	Parken Stadion	49,017 / 49,017	$5,102,138
May 16, 2013	Herning	Denmark	Jyske Bank Boxen	14,938 / 14,938	$1,828,163
May 23, 2013	Naples	Italy	Piazza del Plebiscito	11,647 / 15,000	$951,459
May 26, 2013	Munich	Germany	Olympiastadion	41,579 / 41,579	$3,958,563
May 28, 2013	Hanover	Germany	AWD-Arena	36,859 / 37,000	$3,876,987
May 31, 2013	Padua	Italy	Stadio Euganeo	36,208 / 40,000	$3,102,414
June 3, 2013	Milan	Italy	Stadio San Siro	56,670 / 56,670	$4,209,027
June 15, 2013	London	England	Wembley Stadium	70,425 / 70,425	$6,479,237
June 18, 2013	Glasgow	Scotland	Hampden Park	44,000 / 46,988	$4,182,184
June 20, 2013	Coventry	England	Ricoh Arena	37,262 / 37,262	$3,480,677
June 22, 2013	Nijmegen	Netherlands	Goffertpark	64,900 / 64,900	$6,309,898
June 26, 2013	Gijón	Spain	El Molinón Stadium	30,571 / 30,571	$2,624,674
June 29, 2013	Paris	France	Stade de France	61,867 / 61,867	$5,785,660
June 30, 2013 (Note: The June 30, 2013, concert in London at the Olympic Park was a part of Hard Rock Calling.)	London	England	Olympic Park	—N/a	—N/a
July 3, 2013	Geneva	Switzerland	Stade de Genève	22,391 / 40,000	$3,115,860
July 5, 2013	Mönchengladbach	Germany	Borussia-Park	34,050 / 37,800	$3,809,644
July 7, 2013	Leipzig	Germany	Red Bull Arena	46,346 / 46,346	$4,297,021
July 11, 2013	Rome	Italy	Ippodromo delle Capannelle	27,024 / 37,000	$2,261,922
July 13, 2013 (Note: The July 13, 2013, concert in Werchter at the Werchter Grounds was a part of the TW Classic Festival.)	Werchter	Belgium	Werchter Grounds	60,000 / 60,000	—N/a
July 16, 2013	Limerick	Ireland	Thomond Park	28,091 / 28,091	$3,226,410
July 18, 2013	Cork	Ireland	Páirc Uí Chaoimh	37,328 / 37,328	$4,263,690
July 20, 2013	Belfast	Northern Ireland	King's Hall	28,211 / 28,211	$3,131,421
July 23, 2013	Cardiff	Wales	Millennium Stadium	27,722 / 29,000	$2,507,945
July 24, 2013	Leeds	England	Leeds Arena	11,367 / 11,367	$1,134,415
July 27, 2013	Kilkenny	Ireland	Nowlan Park	54,292 / 54,292	$6,223,768
July 28, 2013	Kilkenny	Ireland	Nowlan Park	54,292 / 54,292	$6,223,768
South America
September 12, 2013	Santiago	Chile	Movistar Arena	5,256 / 10,100	$481,791
September 14, 2013	Buenos Aires	Argentina	Estadio G.E.B.A.	7,095 / 12,000	$729,946
September 18, 2013	São Paulo	Brazil	Espaço das Américas	5,359 / 7,500	$670,466
September 21, 2013 (Note: The September 21, 2013, concert in Rio de Janeiro at the Parque dos Atletas was a part of the Rock in Rio Festival.)	Rio de Janeiro	Brazil	Parque dos Atletas	—N/a	—N/a
Total				3,378,629 / 3,456,384 (97.8%)	$340,599,114

== Supporting acts ==
- Tom Cochrane – August 26, 2012, Moncton
- The Trews – August 26, 2012, Moncton
- The Black Crowes – June 22, 2013, Nijmegen
- Jamie N Commons – June 22, 2013, Nijmegen
- The Cyborgs - July 11, 2013, Rome
- Josh Ritter & The Royal City Band – July 27, 2013, Nowlan Park
- Glen Hansard – July 27, 2013, Nowlan Park
- Damien Dempsey – July 27, 2013, Nowlan Park
- Imelda May – July 28, 2013, Nowlan Park
- LAPD (Liam O'Flynn, Andy Irvine, Paddy Glackin & Dónal Lunny) – July 28, 2013, Nowlan Park
- Delorentos – July 28, 2013, Nowlan Park

== Personnel ==
=== The E Street Band ===
- Bruce Springsteen – lead vocals, lead guitar, rhythm guitar, acoustic guitar, harmonica, piano
- Roy Bittan – piano, synthesizer, accordion
- Nils Lofgren – rhythm guitar, lead guitar, pedal steel guitar, acoustic guitar, accordion, background vocals
- Patti Scialfa – background vocals, some duet vocals, acoustic guitar, occasional tambourine (did not appear at every show due to family commitments)
- Garry Tallent – bass guitar, background vocals, rare tuba
- Steven Van Zandt – rhythm guitar, lead guitar, mandolin, acoustic guitar, background vocals, occasional featured lead vocal
- Max Weinberg – drums, rare tambourine

and

- Soozie Tyrell – violin, acoustic guitar, percussion, background vocals
- Charles Giordano – organ, accordion, electronic glockenspiel, rare piano, occasional background vocals

with

- Tom Morello – guitar, backing vocals, co-lead vocals on "The Ghost of Tom Joad" (Morello filled in for Van Zandt during the Australian leg of the tour)

The E Street Horns:

- Jake Clemons – saxophone, percussion, background vocals
- Eddie Manion – saxophone, percussion
- Curt Ramm – trumpet, percussion
- Barry Danielian – trumpet, percussion
- Clark Gayton – trombone, tuba, percussion

The E Street Choir:

- Curtis King – background vocals, tambourine
- Cindy Mizelle – background vocals, tambourine
- Michelle Moore – background vocals, rapping on Rocky Ground
- Everett Bradley – percussion, background vocals

=== Guest musicians/appearances ===
- Jarod Clemons (3/23/12, 12/6/12)
- Peter Wolf (3/26/12)
- Adele Springsteen (3/29/12, 9/22/12, 9/30/13 – Bruce's mother danced with her son on "Dancing in the Dark", presented him onstage with a cake on his birthday)
- Tom Morello (4/26/12, 4/27/12, 7/14/12, 9/7/12, 9/8/12, 12/4/12, 2013 Australian leg)
- Dr. John (4/29/12)
- Kevin Buell (5/2/12 – Bruce's guitar tech performed guitar on "Waiting on a Sunny Day")
- Garland Jeffreys (5/29/12, 12/6/12)
- Mumford & Sons (5/29/12)
- Elliott Murphy (6/11/12, 5/3/13, 6/29/13)
- Southside Johnny (6/17/12)
- Jessica Springsteen (7/5/12 – Bruce's daughter danced with her father during "Dancing in the Dark")
- The Roots (7/7/12)
- John Fogerty (7/14/12)
- Paul McCartney (7/14/12)
- Ken Casey (8/15/12)
- Tom Cochrane & Red Rider (8/26/12)
- Olivia Tallent (9/2/12 – Garry's daughter performed backing vocals on "Working on the Highway" with Michelle Moore's daughter)
- Eddie Vedder (9/7/12, 9/8/12)
- Ali Weinberg (9/14/12, 7/28/13 – Max's daughter performed accordion on "American Land", backing vocals on "Twist and Shout" and "Shout")
- Vini "Mad Dog" Lopez (9/19/12)
- Gary U.S. Bonds (9/21/12, 9/22/12)
- Virginia Springsteen Shave (9/22/12- Bruce's sister helped celebrate Springsteen's birthday onstage during show)
- Vivienne Scialfa (9/22/12- Bruce's mother in law helped celebrate Springsteen's birthday onstage during show)
- Mike Scialfa (9/22/12- Bruce's brother in law helped celebrate Springsteen's birthday onstage during show)
- Maureen Van Zandt (9/22/12- Steve's wife helped celebrate Springsteen's birthday onstage during show)
- Joe Grushecky and son Johnny (10/27/12)
- Mike Ness (12/4/12)
- Sam Moore (12/6/12)
- Jimmy Barnes (3/30/13, 3/31/13)
- Jon Landau (5/14/13)
- Gaspard Murphy (6/29/13)
- Pamela Springsteen (6/30/13 – Bruce's sister was brought onstage and sang during "Dancing in the Dark")
- Jay Weinberg (7/5/13)
- Ben Harper (7/13/13)
- Eric Burdon (7/23/13)
- Glen Hansard (7/27/13)
- Jon Bon Jovi (12/12/12)

== See also ==
- List of highest-grossing concert tours
