= Ippodromo delle Capannelle, Rome 2013 =

Live album by Bruce Springsteen and the E Street Band
- Released: November 11, 2015
- Recorded: July 11, 2013
- Genre: Rock
- Label: http://live.brucespringsteen.net
- Producer: John Cooper

Bruce Springsteen and the E Street Band chronology
Schottenstein Center, Ohio 2005 (2015)	Ippodromo delle Capannelle, Rome 2013 (2015)	The Ties That Bind: The River Collection (2015)

Ippodromo Delle Capannelle, Rome 2013 is a live album by Bruce Springsteen and the E Street Band, released in November 2015 and the eighth official release through the Bruce Springsteen Archives. The show was originally recorded live at the Ippodromo delle Capannelle in Rome, Italy on July 11, 2013 during the Wrecking Ball Tour.

The concert is available on CD and digital download.

== Background ==
This recording was made during a string of European festivals during the 2013 tour. The set is most notable for a quartet of songs from The Wild, The Innocent, & The E Street Shuffle: "Kitty’s Back", "Incident on 57th Street", "Rosalita (Come Out Tonight)" and "New York City Serenade" featuring the Roma Sinfonietta string section were performed together for only the second time since 1975.

== Track listing ==
All songs by Bruce Springsteen, except as noted.

=== Set One ===
1. "Spirit in the Night" - 11:06
2. "My Love Will Not Let You Down" - 6:08
3. "Badlands" - 6:00
4. "Death to My Hometown" - 4:26
5. "Roulette" - 4:36
6. "Lucky Town" - 6:39
7. "Summertime Blues" - 3:35 (Cochran, Capehart)
  - Originally recorded by Eddie Cochran
8. "Stand On It" - 5:44
9. "Working on the Highway" - 5:37
10. "Candy's Room" - 3:26
11. "Mona/Not Fade Away/She's the One" - 8:59 ("Mona" by McDaniel, "Not Fade Away" by Holly and Petty)
  - "Mona" originally recorded by Bo Diddley, "Not Fade Away" originally recorded by Buddy Holly
12. "Brilliant Disguise" - 5:53
13. "Kitty's Back" - 15:56
14. "Incident on 57th Street" - 9:52
15. "Rosalita (Come Out Tonight)" - 9:46
16. "New York City Serenade"- 12:12
  - Featuring the Roma Sinfonnietta string section
17. "Shackled and Drawn" - 7:23
18. "Darlington County" - 6:41
19. "Bobby Jean" - 4:16
20. "Waitin' on a Sunny Day" - 7:15
21. "The Rising" - 5:26
22. "Land of Hope and Dreams" - 8:49
  - Contains a snippet of "People Get Ready" written by Mayfield and originally recorded by The Impressions

=== Encore ===
1. "Born in the U.S.A." - 4:50
2. "Born to Run" - 5:32
3. "Dancing in the Dark" - 7:54
4. "Tenth Avenue Freeze-Out" - 7:07
5. "Twist and Shout" - 7:17 (Medley and Berns)
  - Originally recorded by The Isley Brothers
6. "Shout" - 6:46
  - Originally written and recorded by The Isley Brothers
7. "Thunder Road" - 6:30

== Personnel ==
=== The E Street Band ===
- Bruce Springsteen - lead vocals, lead guitar, rhythm guitar, acoustic guitar, harmonica, piano
- Roy Bittan - piano, synthesizer, accordion
- Nils Lofgren - rhythm guitar, lead guitar, pedal steel guitar, acoustic guitar, accordion, background vocals
- Patti Scialfa - background vocals, some duet vocals, acoustic guitar, occasional tambourine (did not appear at every show due to family commitments)
- Garry Tallent - bass guitar, background vocals, rare tuba
- Steven Van Zandt - rhythm guitar, lead guitar, mandolin, acoustic guitar, background vocals, occasional featured lead vocal
- Max Weinberg - drums, rare tambourine

and

- Soozie Tyrell - violin, acoustic guitar, percussion, background vocals
- Charles Giordano - organ, accordion, electronic glockenspiel, rare piano, occasional background vocals

The E Street Horns:

- Jake Clemons - saxophone, percussion, background vocals
- Eddie Manion - saxophone, percussion
- Curt Ramm - trumpet, percussion
- Barry Danielian - trumpet, percussion
- Clark Gayton - trombone, tuba, percussion

The E Street Choir:

- Curtis King - background vocals, tambourine
- Cindy Mizelle - background vocals, tambourine
- Michelle Moore - background vocals, rapping on Rocky Ground
- Everett Bradley - percussion, background vocals
