= Collection: 1973–2012 =

Compilation album by Bruce Springsteen
- Released: March 8, 2013
- Recorded: 1973–2012, 2013
- Genre: Rock; heartland rock
- Length: 79:44
- Label: Columbia

Bruce Springsteen chronology
Wrecking Ball (2012)	Collection: 1973–2012 (2013)	High Hopes (2014)

Bruce Springsteen and the E Street Band chronology
Wrecking Ball (2012)	Collection: 1973-2012 (2013)	High Hopes (2014)

Collection: 1973–2012 is a compilation album by Bruce Springsteen released on Columbia in 2013 containing 18 tracks spanning forty years of Springsteen's musical career. Fourteen of the songs on the album are credited to Springsteen as a solo act and four (namely "Rosalita (Come Out Tonight)", "Hungry Heart", "Born in the U.S.A.", and "Dancing in the Dark") are credited to the formation Bruce Springsteen & the E Street Band. Two of the tracks, namely "Badlands" and "The Promised Land", were remastered for the compilation edition.

Professional ratings
Review scores
Source	Rating
AllMusic	3.5/5 stars

== Track listing ==
All songs written by Bruce Springsteen, except where noted.

No.	Title	Writer(s)	Length
1.	"Rosalita (Come Out Tonight)"	Bruce Springsteen & The E Street Band	7:05
2.	"Thunder Road"		4:50
3.	"Born To Run"		4:32
4.	"Badlands"		4:04
5.	"The Promised Land"		4:30
6.	"Hungry Heart"	Bruce Springsteen & The E Street Band	3:21
7.	"Atlantic City"		3:59
8.	"Born In The U.S.A."	Bruce Springsteen & The E Street Band	4:41
9.	"Dancing In The Dark"	Bruce Springsteen & The E Street Band	4:05
10.	"Brilliant Disguise"		4:16
11.	"Human Touch"		5:12
12.	"Streets Of Philadelphia"		3:18
13.	"The Ghost of Tom Joad"		4:24
14.	"The Rising"		4:49
15.	"Radio Nowhere"		3:20
16.	"Working on a Dream"		3:32
17.	"We Take Care of Our Own"		3:55
18.	"Wrecking Ball"		5:50

== Release ==
The album was released on March 8, 2013, as an Australian Limited Tour Edition. The European Edition was released on April 15, 2013.

== Charts ==
=== Weekly charts ===
Weekly chart performance for Collection: 1973–2012
Chart (2013)	Peak
Austrian Albums (Ö3 Austria)	15
Belgian Albums (Ultratop Flanders)	24
Belgian Albums (Ultratop Wallonia)	56
Danish Albums (Hitlisten)	24
Dutch Albums (Album Top 100)	78
Finnish Albums (Suomen virallinen lista)	15
French Albums (SNEP)	85
German Albums (Offizielle Top 100)	23
Italian Albums (FIMI)	11
Norwegian Albums (VG-lista)	1
Portuguese Albums (AFP)	24
Spanish Albums (Promusicae)	11
Swedish Albums (Sverigetopplistan)	6
Swiss Albums (Schweizer Hitparade)	23

=== Year-end charts ===
2013 year-end chart performance for Collection: 1973–2012
Chart (2013)	Rank
Swedish Albums (Sverigetopplistan)	87
