= Bruce Springsteen Archives =

Live albums by Bruce Springsteen and the E Street Band

Bruce Springsteen Archives is an ongoing collection of officially released live albums by Bruce Springsteen and the E Street Band. Beginning in November 2014 with the release of the 2012 Apollo Theater concert, Springsteen decided to release fully recorded shows from his past archives to fans for purchase. The releases, which focus on tours prior to the launch of the archive, have ranged from the Born to Run tours through the Wrecking Ball World Tour; subsequent shows from 2014 on have been released on an ongoing basis, with full tours represented, as part of the same program.

The idea originally came after Springsteen released every concert from his High Hopes Tour for fans to purchase. Those shows were originally released for a limited time after the original concert dates, and were made available on a permanent basis after the launch of the archive. Several shows had previously circulated among fans as bootleg recordings; the archive releases are sourced from soundboard recordings, and are digitally restored and remastered. Releases are provided in a variety of digital download formats or on CD.

== Releases ==
#	Venue	City	Tour	Concert date	Release date	Notes
1	Apollo Theater	New York City		March 9, 2012	November 17, 2014	Tenth anniversary of SiriusXM Radio. Tickets were available only to winners of a SiriusXM subscriber-only contest. Also served as the first rehearsal show for the Wrecking Ball World Tour.
2	The Agora	Cleveland	Darkness on the Edge of Town	August 9, 1978	December 23, 2014	One of five shows broadcast live on regional radio in 1978.
3	Tower Theater	Upper Darby Township, Pennsylvania	Born to Run	December 31, 1975	February 10, 2015	Last show of the 1975 leg of the Born to Run Tour. Audio upgraded from the original 16-track analog master tapes on Dec 24, 2025.
4	Nassau Veterans Memorial Coliseum	Uniondale, New York	The River	December 31, 1980	March 25, 2015	Third night of a three-night stand. A re-mix of this show was released on July 5, 2019.
5	Brendan Byrne Arena	East Rutherford, New Jersey	Born in the U.S.A.	August 5, 1984	May 13, 2015	First night of a ten-night stand.
6	Los Angeles Sports Arena	Los Angeles	Tunnel of Love	April 23, 1988	July 8, 2015	Second night of a five-night stand.
7	Schottenstein Center	Columbus, Ohio	Devils & Dust	July 31, 2005	September 24, 2015	
8	Ippodromo delle Capannelle	Rome	Wrecking Ball	July 11, 2013	November 11, 2015	Original release was replaced with a new mix free of charge to previous purchasers on December 18, 2015.
9	ASU Activity Center	Tempe, Arizona	The River	November 5, 1980	December 24, 2015	Partial audio released free of charge to complement video of this show from The Ties That Bind box set. Between this release and the box set, the entire show was released in official quality.
10	Shrine Auditorium	Los Angeles		November 16, 1990	June 1, 2016	Christic Institute benefit show.
11	Shrine Auditorium	Los Angeles		November 17, 1990	June 1, 2016	Christic Institute benefit show.
12	HSBC Arena	Buffalo, New York	Working on a Dream	November 22, 2009	December 24, 2016	Last show of the tour, and the second to last appearance of Clarence Clemons with the E Street Band (he would appear with them at the Carousel House partial show in Asbury Park, N.J.). Features the only complete performance to date of Greetings from Asbury Park, N.J., Springsteen's debut album.
13	Scottrade Center	St. Louis	Magic	August 23, 2008	April 14, 2017	
14	Olympiastadion	Helsinki	Wrecking Ball	July 31, 2012	May 23, 2017	The longest known show of Springsteen's career.
15	Wachovia Spectrum	Philadelphia	Working on a Dream	October 20, 2009	July 13, 2017	Springsteen's last show at the venue before its demolition. Features a complete performance of the Born in the U.S.A. album.
16	Palace Theatre	Albany, New York	Born To Run	February 7, 1977	August 4, 2017	Touted as the first released soundboard recording of the 1977 leg of the Born to Run Tour, also known as the "Chicken Scratch Tour".
17	Auditorium Theatre	Rochester, New York	Born to Run	February 8, 1977	August 4, 2017	From the 1977 leg of the Born to Run Tour, also known as the "Chicken Scratch Tour".
18	King's Hall	Belfast	Ghost of Tom Joad	March 19, 1996	September 1, 2017	
19	The Summit	Houston	Darkness on the Edge of Town	December 8, 1978	September 21, 2017	Video released as part of The Promise box set. Sales from this release benefited relief efforts for Houston in the wake of Hurricane Harvey.
20	Madison Square Garden	New York City	Reunion Tour	July 1, 2000	October 6, 2017	Tenth night of a ten-night stand, and the last show of the tour. Portions of this show released as part of Live in New York City.
21	Stockholms Stadion	Stockholm	Tunnel of Love	July 3, 1988	November 3, 2017	Night two of a 2-night stand.
22	New Orleans Jazz and Heritage Festival	New Orleans	Sessions Band Tour	April 30, 2006	December 1, 2017	
23	Capitol Theatre	Passaic, New Jersey	Darkness on the Edge of Town	September 20, 1978	December 22, 2017	Second night of a three-night stand.
24	Brendan Byrne Arena	East Rutherford, New Jersey		June 24, 1993	January 5, 2018	The Concert to Fight Hunger, a benefit show for various food banks and hunger-fighting organizations. Features a number of special guests including Clarence Clemons, Max Weinberg, Southside Johnny, and Little Steven.
25	Van Andel Arena	Grand Rapids, Michigan	Devils & Dust	August 3, 2005	February 2, 2018	
26	Brendan Byrne Arena	East Rutherford, New Jersey	Born in the U.S.A.	August 20, 1984	March 2, 2018	Tenth night of a ten-night stand.
27	TD Banknorth Garden	Boston	Magic	November 19, 2007	April 6, 2018	Last appearance of Danny Federici as a touring member of the E Street Band.
28	St. Rose of Lima School	Freehold Borough, New Jersey	Ghost of Tom Joad	November 8, 1996	May 4, 2018	St. Rose of Lima School Hispanic Community Center benefit show. Tickets were only available to residents of Freehold, New Jersey.
29	Madison Square Garden	New York City	Working on a Dream	November 8, 2009	June 1, 2018	Features the first-ever complete performance of The River album.
30	Roxy Theatre	Los Angeles	Darkness on the Edge of Town	July 7, 1978	July 6, 2018	One of five shows broadcast live on regional radio in 1978. Eight selections from this show previously appeared on Live 1975-85.
31	Wembley Arena	London	The River	June 5, 1981	August 3, 2018	Sixth night of a six-night stand. From the European leg of the tour.
32	United Center	Chicago	Reunion Tour	September 30, 1999	September 7, 2018	
33	Olympiastadion	Helsinki	The Rising	June 16, 2003	October 5, 2018	First release from the Rising tour.
34	First Direct Arena	Leeds	Wrecking Ball	July 24, 2013	November 9, 2018	
35	Roxy Theatre	Los Angeles	Born to Run	October 18, 1975	December 7, 2018	Third night of a four-night stand.
36	Madison Square Garden	New York City		September 21, 1979	December 24, 2018	Part of the 1979 MUSE No Nukes concert series advocating against the use of nuclear energy. Note: No longer available as of July 2021.
37	Madison Square Garden	New York City		September 22, 1979	December 24, 2018	Part of the 1979 MUSE No Nukes concert series advocating against the use of nuclear energy. Note: No longer available as of July 2021.
38	Madison Square Garden	New York City	Tunnel of Love	May 23, 1988	January 4, 2019	Fifth night of a five-night stand.
39	St. Pete Times Forum	Tampa, Florida	Magic	April 22, 2008	February 1, 2019	First show after the death of Danny Federici.
40	Sovereign Bank Arena	Trenton, New Jersey	Devils & Dust	November 22, 2005	March 1, 2019	Last show of the tour.
41	Los Angeles Memorial Coliseum	Los Angeles	Born in the U.S.A.	September 27, 1985	April 5, 2019	First night of a four-night stand.
42	Brendan Byrne Arena	East Rutherford, New Jersey	1992–1993 World Tour	July 25, 1992	May 3, 2019	Second night of an eleven-night stand.
43	MetLife Stadium	East Rutherford, New Jersey	Wrecking Ball	September 22, 2012	June 7, 2019	Springsteen's 63rd birthday.
44	Nassau Veterans Memorial Coliseum	Uniondale, New York	The River	December 29, 1980	July 5, 2019	Second night of a three-night stand.
45	Shoreline Amphitheatre	Mountain View, California		October 13, 1986	August 9, 2019	Part of the inaugural installment of the Bridge School Benefit concert series.
46	Capitol Theatre	Passaic, New Jersey	Darkness on the Edge of Town	September 19, 1978	September 6, 2019	First night of a three-night stand. One of five shows broadcast live on regional radio in 1978.
47	Staples Center	Los Angeles	Reunion Tour	October 23, 1999	October 11, 2019	Fourth night of a four-night stand.
48	Paramount Theatre	Asbury Park, New Jersey	Ghost of Tom Joad	November 24, 1996	November 1, 2019	First night of a three-night stand.
49	Winterland Arena	San Francisco	Darkness on the Edge of Town	December 15, 1978	December 20, 2019	One of five shows broadcast live on regional radio in 1978.
50	Winterland Arena	San Francisco	Darkness on the Edge of Town	December 16, 1978	December 20, 2019	
51	Nassau Veterans Memorial Coliseum	Uniondale, New York	Working on a Dream	May 4, 2009	February 7, 2020	
52	Joe Louis Arena	Detroit	Tunnel of Love	March 28, 1988	March 6, 2020	
53	Ullevi	Gothenburg	Wrecking Ball	July 28, 2012	April 3, 2020	
54	Brendan Byrne Arena	East Rutherford, New Jersey	The River	July 9, 1981	May 1, 2020	Sixth night of a six-night stand. "Jersey Girl" from this show previously appeared on Live 1975-85. Sales from this release benefited the New Jersey Pandemic Relief Fund.
55	Hovet	Stockholm	Devils & Dust	June 25, 2005	June 12, 2020	
56	First Union Center	Philadelphia	Reunion Tour	September 25, 1999	July 3, 2020	Sixth night of a six-night stand.
57	Wembley Arena	London	Sessions Band Tour	November 11, 2006	August 21, 2020	
58	Brendan Byrne Arena	East Rutherford, New Jersey	Born in the U.S.A.	August 6, 1984	September 18, 2020	Second night of a ten-night stand.
59	Fox Theatre	Atlanta	Darkness on the Edge of Town	September 30, 1978	October 9, 2020	One of five shows broadcast live on regional radio in 1978. With this release, all five shows broadcast in 1978 on regional radio have been released.
60	Greensboro Coliseum Complex	Greensboro, North Carolina	Magic	April 28, 2008	November 6, 2020	
61	Hammersmith Odeon	London	Born to Run	November 24, 1975	December 4, 2020	Last show of the European leg of the tour.
62	Madison Square Garden	New York City	Working on a Dream	November 7, 2009	December 24, 2020	Features the first-ever complete performance of The Wild, the Innocent & the E Street Shuffle album.
63	Xcel Energy Center	St. Paul, Minnesota	Wrecking Ball	November 12, 2012	January 8, 2021	From the last US leg of the tour.
64	Palais des Congrès Acropolis	Nice	Ghost of Tom Joad	May 18, 1997	February 5, 2021	
65	Madison Square Garden	New York City	Reunion Tour	June 27, 2000	March 12, 2021	Eighth night of a ten-night stand.
66	Los Angeles Memorial Sports Arena	Los Angeles	Tunnel of Love	April 28, 1988	April 2, 2021	Fifth night of a five-night stand.
67	Boston Garden	Boston	1992–1993 World Tour	December 13, 1992	May 7, 2021	
68	Berkeley Community Theatre	Berkeley, California	Darkness on the Edge of Town	July 1, 1978	June 18, 2021	
69	Giants Stadium	East Rutherford, New Jersey	Born in the U.S.A.	August 22, 1985	July 23, 2021	Fourth night of a six-night stand. Steven Van Zandt joins the band for the encore.
70	Fenway Park	Boston	Wrecking Ball	August 15, 2012	August 6, 2021	
71	Tower Theater	Upper Darby Township, Pennsylvania	Devils & Dust	May 17, 2005	September 3, 2021	
72	Conseco Fieldhouse	Indianapolis	Magic	March 20, 2008	October 22, 2021	Last appearance of Danny Federici with the E Street Band.
73	Nassau Veterans Memorial Coliseum	Uniondale, New York	The River	December 28, 1980	December 3, 2021	First night of a three-night stand. With this release, the whole stand has been released.
74	C. W. Post Dome Auditorium	Greenvale, New York	Born to Run	December 12, 1975	December 23, 2021	"Santa Claus Is Comin' to Town" from this show had previously been released and was a regular radio favorite around the holidays.
75	Anaheim Pond	Anaheim, California	Reunion Tour	May 22, 2000	January 7, 2022	
76	Tower Theater	Upper Darby Township, Pennsylvania	Ghost of Tom Joad	December 9, 1995	February 4, 2022	
77	Quicken Loans Arena	Cleveland	Working on a Dream	November 10, 2009	March 4, 2022	Features a complete performance of the Born to Run album.
78	Waldbühne	Berlin	1992–1993 World Tour	May 14, 1993	April 1, 2022	
79	Madison Square Garden	New York City	Tunnel of Love	May 16, 1988	May 6, 2022	First night of a five-night stand.
80	Wembley Arena	London	The River	June 4, 1981	June 3, 2022	Fifth night of a six-night stand. From the European leg of the tour.
81	Palais omnisports de Paris-Bercy	Paris	Wrecking Ball	July 4, 2012	July 1, 2022	From the 2012 European leg of the tour.
82	Palais omnisports de Paris-Bercy	Paris	Wrecking Ball	July 5, 2012	July 1, 2022	From the 2012 European leg of the tour.
83	Brendan Byrne Arena	East Rutherford, New Jersey	Born in the U.S.A.	August 19, 1984	August 5, 2022	Ninth night of a ten-night stand.
84	PalaLottomatica	Rome	Sessions Band Tour	October 10, 2006	September 2, 2022	
85	Fox Theatre	Atlanta	Darkness on the Edge of Town	October 1, 1978	October 7, 2022	
86	Paramount Theatre	Asbury Park, New Jersey	Ghost of Tom Joad	November 26, 1996	November 4, 2022	Third night of a three-night stand.
87	Sommet Center	Nashville, Tennessee	Magic	August 21, 2008	December 2, 2022	
88	Continental Airlines Arena	East Rutherford, New Jersey	Reunion Tour	July 18, 1999	December 24, 2022	Second night of a 15-night stand.
89	Wachovia Spectrum	Philadelphia	Working on a Dream	October 14, 2009	December 8, 2023	Second night of a four-night stand. Features a complete performance of the Darkness on the Edge of Town album.
90	Continental Airlines Arena	East Rutherford, New Jersey	Reunion Tour	July 15, 1999	December 22, 2023	Opening night of a 15-night stand.
91	Millennium Stadium	Cardiff, Wales	Wrecking Ball	July 23, 2013	January 12, 2024	
92	E. J. Thomas Hall	Akron, Ohio	Ghost of Tom Joad	September 25, 1996	February 2, 2024	
93	Capitol Theatre	Passaic, New Jersey	Darkness on the Edge of Town	September 21, 1978	March 8, 2024	Third night of a three-night stand. With this release, the whole stand has been released.
94	Seneca Field House, Seneca College	Toronto, ON	Born to Run	December 21, 1975	December 20, 2024	
95	Pontiac Theatre at GM Place	Vancouver, BC	Devils & Dust	August 13, 2005	February 7, 2025	
96	CenturyLink Center	Omaha, NE	Wrecking Ball	November 15, 2012	March 7, 2025	
97	Amway Arena	Orlando, FL	Magic	April 23, 2008	April 11, 2025	
98	Oakland Arena	Oakland, CA	Reunion Tour	October 28, 1999	May 9, 2025	The final night of a three-show stand in Oakland
99	Brendan Byrne Arena	East Rutherford, New Jersey	The River	July 6, 1981	Oct 3, 2025	Fourth night of a six-night stand
100	Oracle Arena	Oakland, CA	Magic	October 26, 2007	Nov 7, 2025	
101	HK Areena	Turku	Wrecking Ball	May 8, 2013	Dec 5, 2025	Second night
102	Capitol Theatre	Sydney	Ghost of Tom Joad	Feb 12, 1997	Feb 6, 2026	Fifth and final show in Sydney
103	Madison Square Garden	New York City	Reunion Tour	June 22, 2000	March 6, 2026	Fifth night of a ten-night stand. World premiere of "Another Thin Line".
104	HSBC Arena	Buffalo, New York	Devils & Dust	July 18, 2005	Aug 7, 2026	
105	Stockholms Stadion	Stockholm	Tunnel of Love	July 2, 1988	Sept 4, 2026	Night one of a 2-night stand.
106	Palau Sant Jordi	Barcelona	The Rising	October 16, 2002	October 2, 2026	Previously released on DVD. This release contains improved audio.
107	Brendan Byrne Arena	East Rutherford, New Jersey	1992–1993 World Tour	July 31, 1992	November 13, 2026	Night six of an 11-night stand.
