= The Christic Shows 1990 =

Live album by Bruce Springsteen
- Released: June 1, 2016
- Recorded: November 16 and 17, 1990
- Genre: Acoustic music
- Label: Official website
- Producer: Bruce Jackson

Bruce Springsteen chronology
| Arizona State University, Tempe 1980 (2015) | The Christic Shows 1990 (2016) | Chapter and Verse (2016) |

The Christic Shows 1990 is a live album by Bruce Springsteen, released in June 2016 and was the tenth official release through the Bruce Springsteen Archives. The two solo acoustic shows were recorded on November 16 and 17 1990 at The Shrine, Los Angeles, California. The two-night stand included performances of six new Springsteen songs. The album features appearances by Jackson Browne and Bonnie Raitt, who were the other two announced artists performing in the shows.

== Track listing ==
All tracks written by Bruce Springsteen, except where noted.

=== Set one ===
1. "Brilliant Disguise" – 5:31
2. "Darkness on the Edge of Town" – 3:52
3. "Mansion on the Hill" – 4:21
4. "Reason to Believe" – 5:03
5. "Red Headed Woman" – 5:13
6. "57 Channels (And Nothin' On)" – 3:49
7. "My Father's House" – 7:59
8. "Tenth Avenue Freeze-Out" – 4:12
9. "Atlantic City" – 3:54
10. "Wild Billy's Circus Story" – 4:30
11. "Nebraska" – 5:41
12. "When the Lights Go Out" – 3:30
13. "Thunder Road – 6:21
14. "My Hometown" – 8:16
15. "Real World" – 5:07
16. "Highway 61 Revisited" – 3:55 (Dylan)
  - Originally recorded by Bob Dylan
  - Featuring Jackson Browne and Bonnie Raitt
17. "Across the Borderline" – 5:26
  - Featuring Jackson Browne and Bonnie Raitt

=== Set two ===
1. "Brilliant Disguise" – 5:34
2. "Darkness on the Edge of Town" – 3:41
3. "Mansion on the Hill" – 5:38
4. "Reason to Believe" – 5:32
5. "Red Headed Woman" – 5:38
6. "57 Channels (And Nothin' On)" – 4:08
7. "The Wish" – 7:58
8. "Tougher Than the Rest" – 3:53
9. "Tenth Avenue Freeze-Out" – 3:43
10. "Soul Driver" – 2:41
11. "State Trooper" – 3:08
12. "Nebraska" – 5:51
13. "When the Lights Go Out" – 3:35
14. "Thunder Road – 6:12
15. "My Hometown" – 8:54
16. "Real World" – 4:55
17. "Highway 61 Revisited"- 4:09 (Dylan)
  - Originally recorded by Bob Dylan
  - Featuring Jackson Browne and Bonnie Raitt
18. "Across the Borderline" – 5:40
  - Featuring Jackson Browne and Bonnie Raitt

== Personnel ==
- Bruce Springsteen – lead vocals, lead guitar, acoustic guitar, piano, harmonica
- Jackson Browne – vocals, guitar on "Highway 61 Revisited", vocals and piano on "Across the Borderline"
- Bonnie Raitt – vocals, tambourine on "Highway 61 Revisited" and vocals, slide guitar on "Across the Borderline"
