= Schottenstein Center, Ohio 2005 =

Live album by Bruce Springsteen
- Released: September 25, 2015
- Recorded: July 31, 2005
- Genre: Rock
- Length: 2:11:11
- Label: Self-released
- Producer: John Cooper

Bruce Springsteen chronology
LA Sports Arena, California 1988 (2015)	Schottenstein Center, Ohio 2005 (2015)	Ippodromo delle Capannelle, Rome 2013 (2015)

Schottenstein Center, Ohio 2005 is a live album by Bruce Springsteen, released in September 2015. It was the seventh official release through the Bruce Springsteen Archives. The show was originally recorded live at the Schottenstein Center in Columbus, Ohio on July 31, 2005 during the Devils & Dust Tour.

The concert is available on CD and digital download at Springsteen's website.

== Track listing ==
All songs by Bruce Springsteen, except as noted.

=== Set One ===
1. "Lift Me Up" - 5:31
2. "Reason to Believe" - 5:50
3. "Devils & Dust" - 4:33
4. "Lonesome Day" - 5:02
5. "Long Time Comin'" - 5:05
6. "Back in Your Arms" - 4:50
7. "For You" - 5:41
8. "State Trooper" - 4:18
9. "Cynthia" - 5:24
10. "One Step Up" - 4:36
11. "Reno" - 4:30
12. "When You're Alone" - 4:15
13. "Valentine's Day" - 4:36
14. "Lost in the Flood" - 5:34
15. "The Rising" - 5:09
16. "Further On (Up the Road)" - 7:43
17. "Jesus Was an Only Son" - 4:22
18. "Two Hearts" - 4:39
19. "The Hitter" - 6:28
20. "Matamoros Banks" - 6:46

=== Encore ===
1. "Ramrod" - 4:20
2. "Bobby Jean" - 4:52
3. "The Promised Land" - 8:25
4. "Dream Baby Dream" - 8:33
  - Originally Written and Recorded by Suicide

== Personnel ==
- Bruce Springsteen – Vocals, Acoustic Guitar, 12 String Acoustic Guitar, Electric Guitar, Harmonica, Wurlitzer Electric Piano, Acoustic Piano
- Allan Fitzgerald - Keyboard accompaniment (off stage)
