= Auditorium Theatre, Rochester, NY 1977 =

Live album by Bruce Springsteen and the E Street Band
- Released: August 2017
- Recorded: February 8, 1977
- Venue: Auditorium Theatre, Rochester, NY
- Genre: Rock
- Producer: Chas Gerber

Bruce Springsteen and the E Street Band chronology
Palace Theatre, Albany 1977 (2017)	Auditorium Theatre, Rochester, NY 1977 (2017)	The Summit, Houston, TX December 8, 1978 (2017)

Auditorium Theatre, Rochester, NY 1977 is a live album by Bruce Springsteen and the E Street Band, released in August 2017. It is the sixteenth such release by the Bruce Springsteen Archives. The show was recorded on February 8, 1977, at the Auditorium Theatre in Rochester, NY and is one of the first soundboard recordings to surface from the 1977 tour which features early renditions of "Something in the Night", "Rendezvous" and "The Promise" along with the unreleased original "Action in the Streets" featuring the Miami Horns.

The concert is available on CD and digital download at live.brucespringsteen.net. and also as a bundle titled Action in the Streets which also includes Palace Theatre, Albany 1977.

== Track listing ==
All songs by Bruce Springsteen, except where noted.

=== Main set ===
1. "Something in the Night" – 2:09
2. "Rendezvous" – 3:31
3. "Spirit in the Night" – 7:32
4. "It's My Life" – 14:23
  - originally written by Brill Building, Roger Atkins and Carl D'Errico, and recorded by The Animals
5. "Thunder Road" – 6:33
6. "Mona" – 3:28
  - originally written by Ellas McDaniel, and recorded by Bo Diddley
7. "She's the One" – 5:33
8. "Tenth Avenue Freeze-Out" – 3:43
9. "Action in the Streets" – 5:51
10. "Backstreets" – 10:58
11. "Jungleland" – 12:19
12. "Rosalita (Come Out Tonight)" – 13:56
13. "4th of July, Asbury Park (Sandy)" – 7:42
14. "Raise Your Hand" – 4:24
  - originally written by Steve Cropper, Eddie Floyd, and Al Bell, and recorded by Eddie Floyd
15. "The Promise" – 5:26
16. "Born to Run" – 5:16

== Personnel ==
The E Street Band

- Bruce Springsteen – lead vocals, electric guitar, harmonica, piano
- Roy Bittan – piano, backing vocals
- Clarence Clemons – tenor saxophone, baritone saxophones, percussion, background vocals
- Garry Tallent – bass guitar
- Steven Van Zandt – electric guitar, background vocals
- Danny Federici – organ, glockenspiel, accordion
- Max Weinberg – drums

Miami Horns

- Ed De Palma – saxophone
- John Binkley – trumpet
- Steve Paraczky – trumpet, flugelhorn
- Dennis Orlock – trombone
