= Wrecking Ball (Bruce Springsteen song) =

Song by Bruce Springsteen

Single by Bruce Springsteen

from the album Wrecking Ball
- Released: 2009 (live version), 2012 (studio version)
- Length: 5:48 (6:37 live single version)
- Label: Columbia Records
- Songwriter: Bruce Springsteen
- Producer: Ron Aniello

Bruce Springsteen singles chronology
"The Wrestler" (2008)	"Wrecking Ball" (2009)	"We Take Care of Our Own" (2012)

"Wrecking Ball" is a song written and performed by American rock singer-songwriter Bruce Springsteen. It is the title track of Wrecking Ball, his 17th studio album. It was first released as a live single in 2009, and it charted at number three on the Hot Singles Sales chart.

== History ==
The song was written in 2009 as a tribute to New Jersey's Giants Stadium before its impending closure and demolition; Springsteen and the E Street Band had performed there nearly twenty times since the 1980s. It was debuted live at their final five concerts at the stadium in October 2009 (as part of the Working on a Dream Tour), which were also the final concerts hosted by the venue. A live version of the song from these concerts was released in 2009 as a single.

"Wrecking Ball" was listed at number 43 in Rolling Stone' list of Bruce Springsteen's 100 best songs. His guitarist Steve Van Zandt said about the song: "I think it's a great example of how good craft becomes art. I really believe that is how most of it happens. It's rare that someone sets out to do something that is great art and actually succeeds at it. Most of the time that's not the thought. Bruce certainly does that more than most."
