= The Roxy July 7, 1978 =

Live album by Bruce Springsteen and the E Street Band
- Released: July 2018
- Recorded: July 7, 1978
- Venue: The Roxy Theatre, West Hollywood, California
- Genre: Rock
- Length: 3:35:00
- Label: Rox Vox

The Roxy, July 7, 1978 is a live concert performance by American singer-songwriter Bruce Springsteen and the E Street Band. It took place at the Roxy Theatre in West Hollywood, California, during the Darkness on the Edge of Town Tour. The concert was originally broadcast live over Los Angeles radio station KMET-FM and was officially released in 2018 as part of Springsteen's archival live series.

== History ==
The concert was a club show scheduled during a break in Springsteen's arena tour. The Roxy Theatre, a small venue with an approximate capacity of 500, hosted a limited audience. Most tickets were given away through radio station contests, contributing to the performance’s exclusivity. The concert was part of a series of radio broadcast shows from the 1978 tour, recorded using professional multi-track equipment.

The show was recorded via the Wally Heider mobile truck and engineered by Jimmy Iovine’s team. It was mixed for FM broadcast at the time and later remixed by Jon Altschiller for its official release in 2018. The recording was made available in multiple digital formats, including FLAC, MP3, and CD-R, as part of the Bruce Springsteen Live Archive Series.

The Roxy performance lasted over three hours and included a mixture of tracks from Darkness on the Edge of Town, earlier albums, cover songs, and a few unreleased compositions. Among the highlights were the live debut of "Point Blank" and the first known piano performance of "Independence Day." Other notable songs included "Racing in the Street," "Badlands," "Growin’ Up," and covers of "Rave On" and "Heartbreak Hotel."

The performance featured spoken-word interludes and storytelling, including an extended introduction to "Growin’ Up." During the show, Springsteen acknowledged the presence of tapers, stating, "All you bootleggers out there in radioland: Roll your tapes!"

The Roxy concert has been frequently cited as one of the most notable shows of Springsteen's career. It became widely circulated among bootleg collectors due to its FM broadcast and sound quality. Upon its official release, it received positive critical attention. The performance has been described as representative of the energy and intensity associated with Springsteen's 1978 tour.

== Notable performances ==
Highlights from the Roxy Theatre 1978 performance
Song	Notes
"Racing in the Street"	
"Badlands"	
"Thunder Road"	
"Independence Day"	Solo piano
"Point Blank"	
"Rosalita (Come Out Tonight)"	
"Rave On"	
"Heartbreak Hotel"	
"Twist and Shout"	
