= Wrecking Ball (Bruce Springsteen album) =

Studio album by Bruce Springsteen
- Released: March 6, 2012
- Recorded: January 2011–12
- Studio: Stone Hill (Springsteen's home recording studio), Colts Neck, New Jersey
- Genre: Heartland rock; hard rock; Proto-punk
- Length: 51:40
- Label: Columbia
- Producer: Ron Aniello, Bruce Springsteen

Bruce Springsteen chronology
The Promise (2010)	Wrecking Ball (2012)	Collection: 1973–2012 (2013)

Bruce Springsteen and the E Street Band chronology
The Promise (2010)	Wrecking Ball (2012)	Collection: 1973–2012 (2013)

Singles from Wrecking Ball
- 1. "We Take Care of Our Own" Released: January 19, 2012; 2. "Rocky Ground" Released: April 21, 2012; 3. "Death to My Hometown" Released: May 7, 2012

Wrecking Ball is the seventeenth studio album by the American singer-songwriter Bruce Springsteen, released on March 6, 2012, on Columbia Records. It was named best album of 2012 by Rolling Stone and along with the album's first single, "We Take Care of Our Own", was nominated for three Grammy Awards.

== Background and recording ==
All but four songs were written in 2011. Three of the exceptions were songs previously released in live version, the other released on Wrecking Ball:

- "Jack of All Trades", which was written in 2009. During Springsteen's Wrecking Ball World Tour he addressed the crowd and talks about the current state of the economy, which inspired him to write this song three years previously.
- "Wrecking Ball", which was written in 2009 prior to a series of E Street Band shows at Giants Stadium as a tribute to the venue, which was set to close and be demolished. Springsteen later dedicated a live version with revised lyrics to the closing of the Spectrum in Philadelphia. The song made other appearances throughout the final two months of the Working on a Dream Tour;
- "American Land", which was written during the 2006 Seeger Sessions with a studio version being recorded though never released. The song was played throughout that tour and heavily on the subsequent two E Street Band tours; and
- "Land of Hope and Dreams", which was written by Springsteen sometime in 1998 or early 1999 and first performed on the 1999 Reunion Tour with the E Street Band. A studio version was originally recorded in 2002 during the sessions for The Rising album although it was never released. The track also features on Live in New York City, recorded in 2000 and released in 2001.

The album includes tracks that feature Clarence Clemons, who died in June 2011. Clemons performs the saxophone solos on "Land of Hope and Dreams", and backing saxophone rhythms on the title track.

While the tour in support of the album featured the full current E Street Band lineup, the only E Street Band members to appear on the album are Clemons, Steven Van Zandt, Max Weinberg, and Patti Scialfa; adjunct members Charlie Giordano and Soozie Tyrell are also heavily featured. The album features members of the Sessions Band, including the horn section, and special guest appearances by Tom Morello and Matt Chamberlain.

== Music and lyrics ==
"It's protest music, damn right about moral abstractions rather than those finely limned characters good little aesthetes get gooey about, and for me a cathartic up. Second half's less of a scour, which the anti-political find a blessed relief and I find a forgivable nod to humanism and Clarence Clemons."

— Robert Christgau, on the album's subject matter.

The Hollywood Reporter called the album Springsteen at his "angriest yet", and some of the tracks address topics such as economic justice. Musically, the album was described by the Hollywood Reporter as "very rock 'n' roll ... with unexpected textures—loops, electronic percussion[, and] an amazing sweep of influences and rhythms, from hip-hop to Irish folk rhythms."

According to Consequence of Sound's Dan Caffrey, Wrecking Ball is a heartland rock album that sounds like a subtler version of We Shall Overcome: The Seeger Sessions, but also draws on sounds from Springsteen's Human Touch (1992). Andy Gill of The Independent wrote of the album's musical style, "[I]t's couched in a mix of the classic Boss rock bombast and the muscular hootenanny folk-rock of his Seeger Sessions album, with touches of noble gospel, poignant jazz trumpet and feisty Irish rebel music colouring the songs according to their mood." The A.V. Club's Steven Hyden called it "a mainstream rock record" and noted that, musically, the album features "booming drums, squealing guitar solos, violins, banjos, trumpets, pianos, pots, pans, and every available hard surface at Bruce's home studio."

Music writer Robert Christgau interpreted its first six tracks as "heavy irony shading over into murderous rage, with refurbished arena-rock to slam it home". He cited the opening track "We Take Care of Our Own" as an example, writing that "it's perversely anti-political to lay any other interpretation on the opening [track], which cites places 'From the shotgun shack to the Superdome' where we—meaning the U.S.A. so many Americans weren't even born in—documentably haven't taken care of our own." Steve Leftridge of PopMatters found the characters in the songs "less elusive about whom to blame for their troubles, cutting out the middle figures like foremen and hiring men and taking on the real culprits unambiguously". He compared the album to Springsteen's The Rising (2002), writing that if that was his "9–11 album", Wrecking Ball is his "Occupy album".

== Songs ==
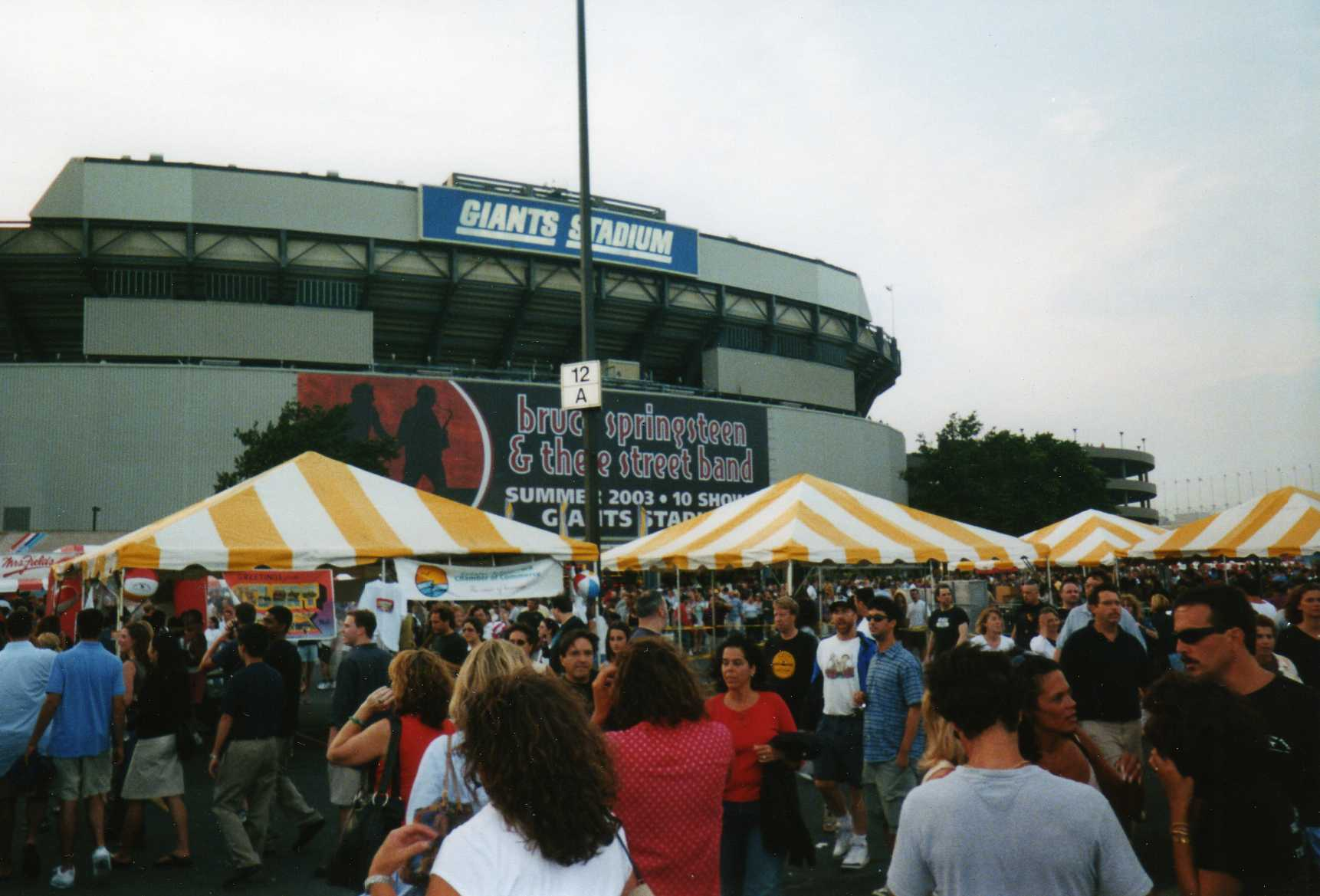
The title track was originally written as a tribute to Giants Stadium (pictured in 2003), when Springsteen and the E Street Band played the venue's final concerts.

According to Springsteen, in 2009 he wrote his first song about a "guy that wears a tie". Springsteen has "spent much of his career writing about characters struggling in tough economic times, but the 2008 financial crisis reportedly convinced him it was time to write about the people and forces that brought America to this 'ugly point.' [The album is an] indictment of Wall Street greed and corruption and a look into the devastation it has wrought."

The opening track, "We Take Care of Our Own", recalls "Born in the U.S.A." in terms of its themes that reflect Springsteen's frustration with the lack of accountability he sees in government. In the vein of "Born in the U.S.A.", the seemingly unabashedly patriotic chorus "Wherever this flag is flown/we take care of our own" is contrasted in the verses with references to the aftermath of Hurricane Katrina suggesting that perhaps we don't "take care of our own".

The song "Death to My Hometown" is an angry, thinly veiled protest song regarding the practices of Wall Street bankers and the 2008 financial crisis for which Springsteen considers them accountable. "They destroyed our families' factories and they took our homes/They left our bodies on the planks, the vultures picked our bones," he sings. The song features heavy Irish folk influences (including a prominent tin whistle riff), as well as samples of Sacred Harp singing.

The title track was originally written in commemoration of the then-pending demolition of Giants Stadium in New Jersey and is written from the stadium's point of view ("I was raised out of steel here in the swamps of Jersey"). However, in the context of the album it becomes a defiant anthem in the face of economic adversity with the refrain "C'mon on and take your best shot/Let me see what you got/Bring on your wrecking ball!" The album version is only slightly differently arranged than the original live version and features no major lyrical changes. This is one of the two songs on the album to feature E Street Band legendary saxophonist Clarence Clemons, who died in 2011.

The song "Rocky Ground" is perhaps the most experimental track on the album. While the song does recall Springsteen's previous work, such as the similarly gospel music–influenced "My City of Ruins" and the hip-hop tinged "Streets of Philadelphia", it features a brief rap by Michelle Moore, a first for a Springsteen song. The song features an atmospheric arrangement that includes a gospel choir and vocal looping (the words "I'm a soldier" from the Church of God in Christ Congregation's recording of "I'm a Soldier in the Army of the Lord" are looped throughout the song). The song's lyrics contain extensive religious imagery, including biblically-inspired lyrics such as "40 days and nights of rain washed this land/Jesus said the moneychangers in this temple will not stand," which reflect the theme of economic equality covered earlier in the album. However, the tone of this song is much more optimistic than most of the previous songs on the album despite its somber arrangement, with Springsteen singing "there's a new day coming" in response to the Gospel Choir's refrain "we've been traveling over rocky ground."

The next and penultimate track, "Land of Hope and Dreams", continues the religious themes and more hopeful outlook with its uplifting lyrics and chorus that use an extensive train metaphor to express Springsteen's take on the American dream. "This train/dreams will not be thwarted/this train/faith will be rewarded," he sings. The song ends with a gospel choir singing excerpts from The Impressions' "People Get Ready" and Springsteen repeating "you just get on board/you just thank the Lord." Compared to its previous live version, which the E Street Band has been performing since 1999, it has been re-worked in a somewhat more compact version and now features electronic drums and the aforementioned use of a gospel choir.

The album's closing track, "We Are Alive," is a "campfire song" for ghosts of the oppressed, martyred strikers, protesters, and immigrant workers. "I was killed in Maryland in 1877/When the railroad workers made their stand/I was killed in 1963/One Sunday morning in Birmingham," he sings during the verse. The chorus, however, has a much more celebratory tone with the refrain "We are alive/And though our bodies lie alone here in the dark/Our spirits rise/To carry the fire and light the spark/To stand shoulder to shoulder and heart to heart." The song, which has an Irish-wake feel to it, is an acoustic number with Springsteen being backed by mariachi horns. The horn riff greatly resembles that from Johnny Cash's hit "Ring of Fire".

According to producer, Ron Aniello, "American Man" and a re-recorded version of "American Skin (41 Shots)" were recorded for the album but not released. "American Skin (41 Shots)" would be released two years later on Springsteen's High Hopes album.

== Critical reception ==
Professional ratings
Aggregate scores
Source	Rating
AnyDecentMusic?	7.7/10
Metacritic	78/100
Review scores
Source	Rating
AllMusic	3/5 stars
The A.V. Club	B+
The Guardian	4/5 stars
The Independent	5/5 stars
MSN Music (Expert Witness)	A−
NME	8/10
Pitchfork	5.9/10
Rolling Stone	5/5 stars
Slant Magazine	2/5 stars
Spin	7/10

Wrecking Ball was released on March 5, 2012, in the United Kingdom and on March 6 in the United States. It received generally positive reviews from music critics. At Metacritic, which assigns a weighted average score out of 100 to reviews and ratings from selected mainstream critics, the album received a metascore of 78, which is based on 41 reviews. David Fricke of Rolling Stone gave the album a rave review, dubbing it "the most despairing, confrontational and musically turbulent album Bruce Springsteen has ever made." BBC Music's Ian Winwood dubbed the album "a work of commanding range and masterful execution", and complimented its music as "varied and surprising". Steve Leftridge of PopMatters called it "cohesively designed" and wrote that it "finds Springsteen still firing on all cylinders—writing with poetic urgency, drawing on traditions old and new, singing and playing with prime strength and energy, and delivering a new set of killer melodies with fresh sonic wallop." The Guardian's Alexis Petridis wrote that the album "paints almost entirely in broad brushstrokes, but its bombast rarely seems hollow: it exists [...] in service of an anger that feels righteous, affecting and genuine." Andy Gill of The Independent found the album "much darker than any of Springsteen's earlier blue-collar tirades" and stated, "There's few, if any, moments of musical innovation, but in terms of political intent, there won't be a harder, more challenging album released all year."

However, Slant Magazine's Jesse Cataldo accused Springsteen of being "borderline jingoistic" and called his perspective "rose-colored", writing that he "seems more concerned with overtures toward harmony than actual dissent, a newfound wishy-washiness that leaves him sounding entirely defanged". Stephen Thomas Erlewine of AllMusic found the album "cumbersome and top heavy" and stated, "Springsteen sacrific[es] impassioned rage in favor of explaining his intentions too clearly." Although he commended the album's themes, Chicago Tribune writer Greg Kot criticized its music as "sterile" and commented that Springsteen "lost his nerve as a coproducer, going for stadium bombast instead of the unadorned grit these stories of hard times demand". Despite commending Springsteen's energy with the songs' "ambitious arrangements", Jon Caramanica of The New York Times found the "energy [to be] in service of deeply nebulous ideas" and stated, "the text is far more ambiguous, and in plenty of places on this album, just outright flat". In the same review, Jon Pareles argued that the album is "sincere, ambitious and angry, which can lead to mixed outcomes. It also — which may be a surprise on an album billed as a broadside — holds some of Springsteen's most elaborate studio concoctions since Born to Run."

In The Village Voice's annual Pazz & Jop critics poll for the year's best albums, Wrecking Ball placed at No. 15 in the voting.

== Commercial performance ==
The album debuted at No. 1 in 16 different countries including both the US and UK charts with approximately 196,000 and 74,000 records sold, respectively. Wrecking Ball became Springsteen's tenth No. 1 album in the United States, tying him with Elvis Presley for third-most No. 1 albums of all time. Only the Beatles (19) and Jay-Z (12) have more No. 1 albums. By November 2013, Wrecking Ball had sold 506,000 in the United States, according to Nielsen SoundScan.

Wrecking Ball sold 1.5 million copies worldwide in 2012, making it the 22nd best selling album of that year.

President Barack Obama used "We Take Care of Our Own" as one of his top campaign songs and it was played during many of his re-election campaign stops including right after his victory speech on election night. Springsteen also appeared at quite a few of his late campaign stops where he performed a short acoustic set. Use of the song helped boost sales of the song by 409%.

== Accolades ==
The album and its single, "We Take Care of Our Own" was nominated for three Grammy Awards including Best Rock Performance and Best Rock Song for "We Take Care of Our Own" and Best Rock Album. Springsteen along with the E Street Band performed at the event.

Rolling Stone ranked Wrecking Ball the number-one album of the year on their Top 50 albums of 2012 list. In his list for The Barnes & Noble Review, Christgau named it the tenth best album of 2012 after calling it "his best since Tunnel of Love if not Born in the U.S.A."

== Track listing ==
Wrecking Ball was released as a two-LP set, a single CD, and a digital download. The CD and download versions were also available in a "Special Edition" format, which included two bonus tracks along with exclusive photos and artwork. The vinyl version included a copy of the standard CD (without the two additional tracks).

All tracks are written by Bruce Springsteen.

No.	Title	Length
1.	"We Take Care of Our Own"	3:54
2.	"Easy Money"	3:37
3.	"Shackled and Drawn"	3:46
4.	"Jack of All Trades"	6:00
5.	"Death to My Hometown"	3:29
6.	"This Depression"	4:08
7.	"Wrecking Ball"	5:49
8.	"You've Got It"	3:48
9.	"Rocky Ground"	4:41
10.	"Land of Hope and Dreams"	6:58
11.	"We Are Alive"	5:36

Bonus tracks
No.	Title	Length
12.	"Swallowed Up (In the Belly of the Whale)"	5:28
13.	"American Land"	4:25

== Personnel ==
Adapted from the album liner notes:

- Bruce Springsteen – vocals, guitars, banjo, piano, organ, drums, percussion, loops
- Ron Aniello – guitar, bass, keyboards, drums, loops, backing vocals (tracks 3, 5, 7, 8, 13), percussion (track 13), hurdy gurdy (track 13)
- Matt Chamberlain – drums & percussion (tracks 3, 5, 8)
- Max Weinberg – drums (tracks 7, 11, 13)
- Steve Jordan – percussion (track 2)
- Kevin Buell – drums & backing vocals (track 5)
- Charlie Giordano – piano, B-3 organ (tracks 3, 5, 7, 9–11, 13), accordion (track 12), celesta (track 13)
- Marc Muller – pedal steel guitar (track 8)
- Tom Morello – electric guitar (tracks 4, 6)
- Greg Leisz – banjo, mandola, lap steel (tracks 8, 11)
- Rob Lebret – electric guitar (track 7), backing vocals (tracks 5, 7, 8, 12, 13)
- Steve Van Zandt – mandolin (tracks 10, 13), backing vocals (tracks 7, 10, 13)
- Darrel Leonard – trumpet, bass trumpet (track 11)
- Curt Ramm – trumpet, cornet (tracks 3, 4, 7–10)
- Clark Gayton – trombone (tracks 3, 4, 7–10)
- Stan Harrison – clarinet, alto sax, tenor sax (tracks 3, 4, 7–10)
- Ed Manion – tenor sax, baritone sax (tracks 3, 4, 7–10)
- Dan Levine – alto horn, euphonium (tracks 3, 4, 9, 10)
- Art Baron – euphonium, tuba, sousaphone, penny whistle (tracks 3–5, 9, 10)
- Clarence Clemons – saxophone solos (tracks 7, 10)
- Soozie Tyrell – violin (tracks 2–7, 10–13), backing vocals (tracks 1–3, 6, 7, 10, 12, 13)
- Patti Scialfa – backing vocals (tracks 1–3, 6, 7, 10–12), vocal arrangements (tracks 2, 6)
- Lisa Lowell – backing vocals (tracks 1–3, 6, 7, 10)
- Michelle Moore – backing vocals (tracks 2, 9, 10)
- Cindy Mizelle – backing vocals (track 3)
- Ross Petersen – backing vocals (tracks 3, 5, 7, 8)
- Clif Norrell – backing vocals (tracks 3, 5, 7, 8)
- Antoinette Savage – backing vocals (track 2)
- Corinda Carford – backing vocals (track 2)
- Tiffeny Andrews – backing vocals (track 2)
- Soloman Cobbs – backing vocals (track 2)
- Lilly Brown – backing vocals (track 2)
- New York Chamber Consort – strings (tracks 1, 4, 7)
- Victorious Gospel Choir – choir (tracks 9, 10)

Technical

- Ron Aniello, Bruce Springsteen – production
- Jon Landau – executive production
- Ross Petersen, Ron Aniello, Rob Lebret, Clif Norrell, Toby Scott – engineering
- Derik Lee, Mike Layos – additional recording assistants
- Bob Clearmountain – mixing (tracks 3, 4, 6–8, 11)
  - Brandon Duncan – assistant
- Chris Lord-Alge – mixing (tracks 5, 10, 13)
  - Keith Armstrong, Nik Karpen – assistants
  - Brad Townsend, Andrew Schubert – mixing assistants
- Mark "Spike" Stent – mixing (track 1)
  - Matty Green – assistant
- Rich Costey – mixing (track 2)
  - Dan Silber, Chris Kasych – assistants
- Ron Aniello, Ross Petersen – Pro Tools, overdub engineers (track 9), mixing (track 12)
  - Rob Lebret – assistant
- Bob Ludwig – mastering
- Toby Scott – production coordination
- Shari Sutcliffe – musician contractor
- Kevin Buell – guitars and technical services
- Michelle Holme, Dave Bett – art direction, design
- Danny Clinch, Jo Lopez – photography

== Charts ==
=== Weekly charts ===
Weekly chart performance for Wrecking Ball
Chart (2012)	Peak position
Austrian Albums Chart	1
Belgian Albums Chart (Flanders)	1
Belgian Albums Chart (Wallonia)	3
Canadian Albums Chart	3
Croatian Albums Chart	1
Czech Republic (IFPI)	4
Danish Albums Chart	1
Dutch Albums Chart	1
Finnish Albums Chart	1
German Albums Chart	1
Greek Albums Chart	18
Hungarian Albums Chart	2
Irish Albums Chart	1
Italian Albums Chart	1
New Zealand Albums Chart	1
Norwegian Albums Chart	1
Polish Albums Chart	10
Portuguese Albums Chart	4
Spanish Albums Chart	1
Swedish Albums Chart	1
Swiss Albums Chart	1
UK Albums Chart	1
US Billboard 200	1

=== Year-end charts ===
Year-end chart performance for Wrecking Ball
Chart (2012)	Position
Australian Albums Chart	82
Belgian Albums Chart (Flanders)	19
Belgian Albums Chart (Wallonia)	66
Dutch Albums Chart	10
Finnish Albums Chart	16
German Albums Chart	32
Italian Albums Chart	17
Spanish Albums Chart	10
Swedish Albums Chart	5
Swiss Albums Chart	22
US Billboard 200	50

== Certifications and sales ==
Certifications and sales for Wrecking Ball
Region	Certification	Certified units/sales
Australia (ARIA)	Gold	35,000^{^}
Austria (IFPI Austria)	Gold	10,000^{*}
Canada (Music Canada)	Gold	40,000^{^}
Finland (Musiikkituottajat)	Platinum	20,814
France (SNEP)	Gold	50,000^{*}
Germany (BVMI)	Platinum	200,000^{^}
Ireland (IRMA)	Platinum	15,000^{^}
Italy (FIMI)	Platinum	60,000^{*}
Portugal (AFP)	Gold	7,500^{^}
Spain (Promusicae)	Platinum	40,000^{^}
Sweden (GLF)	Platinum	40,000^{‡}
Switzerland (IFPI Switzerland)	Gold	15,000^{^}
United Kingdom (BPI)	Gold	100,000^{*}
United States (RIAA)	Gold	506,000
Summaries
Worldwide (2012)	—	1,500,000
^{*} Sales figures based on certification alone.^{^} Shipments figures based on certification alone.^{‡} Sales+streaming figures based on certification alone.
