= Jake Clemons =

American musician (born 1980)

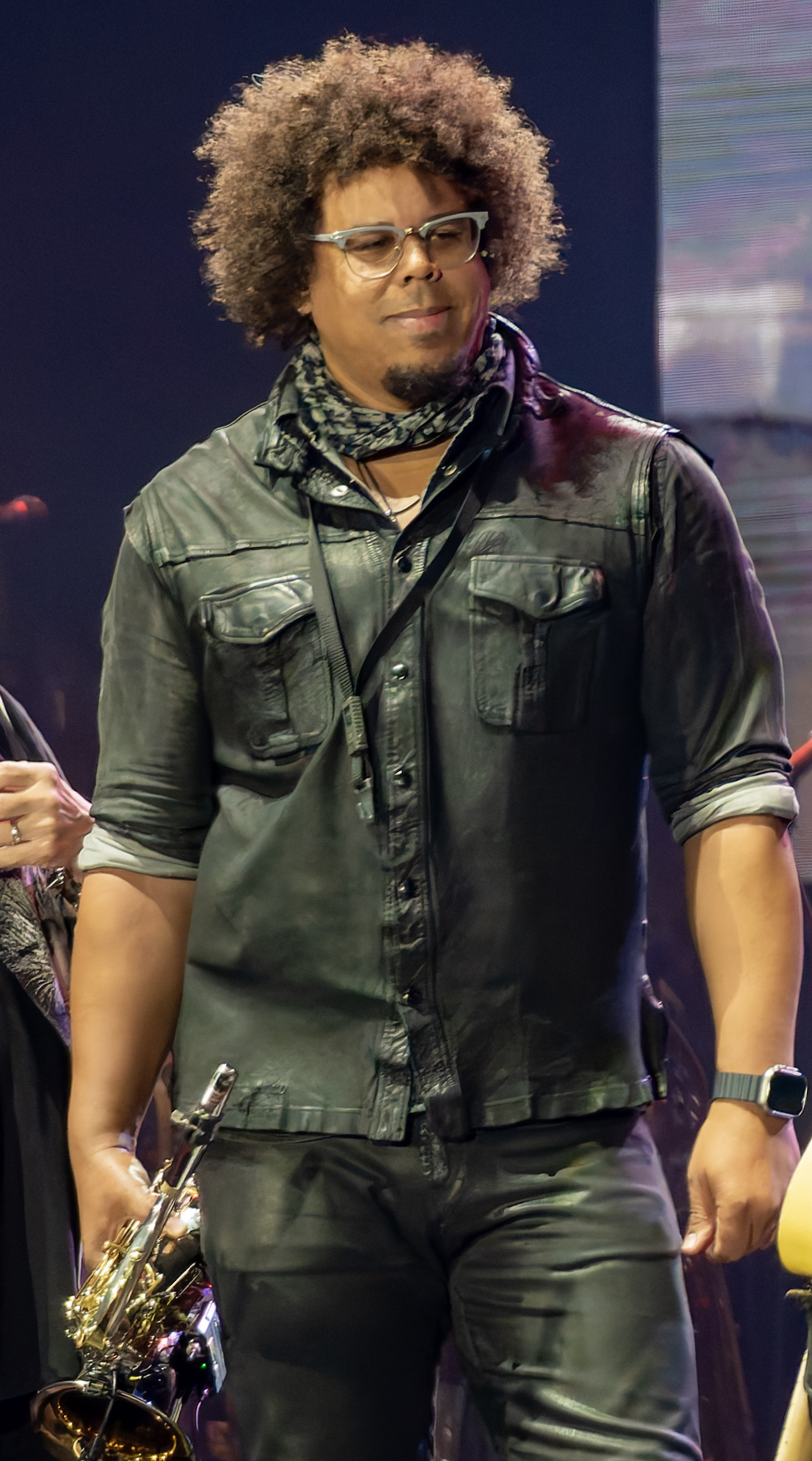
- Clemons on stage during a performance with Bruce Springsteen in 2024

Background information
- Born: February 27, 1980 (age 46)
- Occupation: Musician
- Instruments: Saxophone; percussion; vocals
- Years active: 1998–present
- Member of: Bruce Springsteen and the E Street Band
- Formerly of: Mae
- Website: jakeclemons.com

Jake Clemons (born February 27, 1980) is an American musician, singer and songwriter. Since 2012, he has been the saxophonist for Bruce Springsteen's E Street Band, after the death of the band's original saxophonist, his uncle Clarence Clemons. Clemons has performed various instruments including percussion and backing vocals on Springsteen's Wrecking Ball Tour, High Hopes Tour and the River Tour. Clemons attended the Virginia Governor's School for the Arts to study jazz performance. Clemons also has performed with Eddie Vedder, Roger Waters, the Swell Season and the Roots.

Clemons released a solo album titled Fear & Love in January 2017.

== Tours with Jake Clemons Band ==
- Ireland, England, Scotland – Oct – Nov 2014
- Australia – 2014
- Australia – March 2015
- Ireland/ Canada – Spring 2017
- Ireland/UK – Fall 2017
- Summer Road Trip – Canada, USA, UK – 2018

== Tours with Bruce Springsteen and the E Street Band ==
- Wrecking Ball World Tour (2012–2013)
- High Hopes Tour (2014)
- The River Tour 2016 (2016)
- Australia & New Zealand Summer Tour (2017), billed as Summer 17.
- Springsteen and E Street Band 2023–2025 Tour (2023–2025)
- Land of Hope and Dreams American Tour (2026)
