= Rocky Ground =

Single by Bruce Springsteen

from the album Wrecking Ball
- Released: April 21, 2012
- Recorded: 2011
- Genre: Rock, hip hop, gospel
- Length: 4:40
- Label: Columbia
- Songwriter: Bruce Springsteen
- Producers: Ron Aniello, Bruce Springsteen, Jon Landau (executive prod.)

Bruce Springsteen singles chronology
| "We Take Care of Our Own" (2012) | "Rocky Ground" (2012) | "Death to My Hometown" (2012) |

Music video
- "Rocky Ground" on YouTube

"Rocky Ground" is a song written and recorded by American musician Bruce Springsteen. It is the second single from his album Wrecking Ball and was released exclusively in select stores as a limited-edition 7-inch 45-rpm vinyl single as a part of Record Store Day on April 21, 2012.

The song made its live debut on March 9, 2012, during Springsteen and the E Street Band's performance at the Apollo Theatre.

A music video for the song was first teased on Facebook and Twitter on May 24, 2012, and released the following day on May 25, 2012. The music video features the lyrics being written down on paper in sync with the song, interchanging this with a series of urban and suburban imagery.

On June 15, 2012, a video for the "Modern Mix" of the song was released. The remixed version was produced by Ron Aniello and Matthew Koma.

Rolling Stone named the song the 7th best song of 2012.

== Lyrics and music ==
The song is heavy with a religious theme and features a gospel choir backing Springsteen. Singer Michelle Moore provides backing vocals along with rapping, a first for a Springsteen album. Springsteen has stated he originally attempted to do the rapping himself but was not satisfied with the sound.

"Rocky Ground" contains excerpts of "I'm a Soldier in the Army of the Lord", a traditional gospel song performed by Congregation of the Church of God in Christ and recorded by Alan Lomax in 1942.

== Track listing ==
1. "Rocky Ground": 4:40
2. "The Promise (Bruce Springsteen and the E Street Band live from the Carousel, Asbury Park)": 5:59

== Personnel ==
- Bruce Springsteen – lead vocal, guitars, percussion and loops
- Ron Aniello – drums and loops
- Art Baron – euphonium and tuba
- Clark Gayton – trombone
- Charlie Giordano – piano and organ
- Stan Harrison – clarinet, alto saxophone and tenor saxophone
- Dan Levine – alto horn and euphonium
- Ed Manion – tenor saxophone and baritone saxophone
- Michelle Moore – backing vocals and rapping
- Curt Ramm – trumpet and cornet
- Patti Scialfa – backing vocals
- Victorious Gospel Choir – backing vocals
