= Death to My Hometown =

- Promo single cover in the Netherlands

Single by Bruce Springsteen

from the album Wrecking Ball
- Released: May 2012
- Recorded: 2011
- Genre: Rock, folk punk
- Length: 3:29
- Label: Columbia
- Songwriter: Bruce Springsteen
- Producers: Ron Aniello, Bruce Springsteen, Jon Landau (executive prod.)

Bruce Springsteen singles chronology
"Rocky Ground" (2012)	"Death to My Hometown" (2012)	"High Hopes" (2013)

Music video
- "Death to My Hometown" on YouTube

"Death to My Hometown" is a song written and recorded by American musician Bruce Springsteen and was the third single from his album, Wrecking Ball. It is a protest song, as well as a prominent example of Springsteen's experimentation with Celtic rock rhythms.

A music video for the song was released through Springsteen's website on April 13, 2012, and was compiled from live performances and rehearsals at the Apollo Theater, Atlanta, and SXSW featuring Tom Morello.

== History ==
"Death to My Hometown" became a staple of the Wrecking Ball Tour, usually being played towards the beginning of the sets. The tin whistle riff from the album version was handed over to the newly assembled 5-piece horn section during the shows. The song was played at every Wrecking Ball show in 2012 and 2013, and then occasionally until 2017, but then was absent until 2023. It had also featured five times on the 2024 tour as of July 27.

== Themes ==
The song is an allegorical protest song concerning the causes and fallout of the 2008 financial crisis. Springsteen uses archaic imagery to show how "death" came to his hometown not by war, but by allegedly reckless economic practices. He also references the supposed lack of accountability for the practices by bankers that allegedly led to the crisis. "The greedy thieves who came around/And ate the flesh of everything they found/Whose crimes have gone unpunished now/Who walk the streets as free men now," he sings.

The album version of the song contains a sample of "The Last Words of Copernicus", a fuguing tune by Sarah Lancaster setting a hymn by Philip Doddridge on the subject of death from The Sacred Harp, recorded by Alan Lomax in 1959.

Chart (2012)	Peak position
Belgium (Ultratip Bubbling Under Flanders)	51

== Personnel ==
- Bruce Springsteen – lead vocal, guitar
- Ron Aniello – bass guitar, keyboards, loops, backing vocals
- Art Baron – euphonium, tuba
- Kevin Buell – drums and backing vocals
- Matt Chamberlain – drums and percussion
- Charlie Giordano - organ
- Rob LeBret - backing vocals
- Clif Norrell - backing vocals
- Ross Petersen – backing vocals
- Soozie Tyrell – violin
