= We Take Care of Our Own =

2012 Bruce Springsteen song

Single by Bruce Springsteen

from the album Wrecking Ball
- Released: January 19, 2012
- Recorded: 2011
- Genre: Rock, cowpunk, alternative rock
- Length: 3:53
- Label: Columbia
- Songwriter: Bruce Springsteen
- Producers: Ron Aniello, Bruce Springsteen, Jon Landau (executive prod.)

Bruce Springsteen singles chronology
"Wrecking Ball" (2009)	"We Take Care of Our Own" (2012)	"Rocky Ground" (2012)

Music video
- "We Take Care of Our Own" on YouTube

"We Take Care of Our Own" is a song written and recorded by American musician Bruce Springsteen. It is the first single from his album Wrecking Ball. The single was released for download through amazon.com and iTunes on January 18, 2012. The song made its live debut on February 12, 2012, at the 54th Grammy Awards, where it was nominated for Best Rock Performance and Best Rock Song.

Rolling Stone named the song the 32nd best song of 2012. Music critic Robert Christgau named it the best single of 2012.

== Lyrics and music ==
The song is an up-tempo rocker which resembles the sound of the younger bands Springsteen has recently taken under his wing, such as Arcade Fire and the Gaslight Anthem.

The lyrics express Springsteen's frustration that—after several years of economic hard times—people are less willing to help each other. The song begins:

I've been stumblin' on good hearts turned to stone
The road of good intentions has gone dry as a bone.

The narrator asks where he can find merciful hearts or work to set his hands and soul free and makes references to Hurricane Katrina. However, the refrain strikes a more optimistic (or ironic depending on listener interpretation) note that "Wherever this flag is flown/We take care of our own."

NPR's Ann Powers describes the song as "a bitter anthem" and states that on this song, as with "Born in the U.S.A.," "Glory Days", and 2008's "Girls in Their Summer Clothes," "Springsteen brings out big emotions and then demands we drop the delusions that often accompany them." The New York Times printed a letter from a reader who said that the song rebukes the US government inaction regarding Hurricane Katrina disaster relief in New Orleans; that the song's message "is not that Americans take care of one another, but that we should—and don't."

== Music videos ==
Springsteen was spotted in New Jersey on January 13, 2012, filming what was believed to be a new music video. On January 19, 2012, the date the single was released, Springsteen's official website released a music video for the song containing various black and white images of Springsteen interspersed with text of the song's lyrics.

On February 10, 2012, a second official music video premiered, this time featuring Springsteen performing in abandoned buildings and on rooftops in an urban setting. Various images of working class Americans are shown as lyrics flash by. As Springsteen sings the song's emotional resolution ("Wherever this flag is flown/We take care of our own"), the image transforms from black and white to color, climaxing as Springsteen joins a crowd of everyday Americans walking together in daylight, in unison.

The video was filmed in and around Springsteen's hometown of Asbury Park, including on the roof of the Savoy Theatre and inside of Frank's Deli.

== Use in politics ==
This song was played throughout Barack Obama's 2012 presidential campaign and after his victory speech at his headquarters in Chicago. Sales of the song rose 409% following Obama's speech at the Democratic National Convention.

The song was played at Joe Biden's victory speech after he had won the 2020 presidential election.

== Personnel ==
- Bruce Springsteen – lead vocal, guitars, banjo, piano, organ, drums, percussion, loops
- Patti Scialfa – backing vocals
- Ron Aniello – guitar, bass, keyboards, piano, drums, loops
- Lisa Lowell – backing vocals
- Soozie Tyrell – violin, backing vocals
- New York String Section
  - Rob Mathes – orchestration
  - Sandy Park – string contractor
  - Lisa Kim – concertmaster
  - Myumju Lee – violin
  - Ann Lehmaan – violin
  - Lizz Lim – violin
  - Johanna Marher – violin
  - Annaliesa Place – violin
  - Fiona Simon – violin
  - Sharon Yamada – violin
  - Jung Sun Yu – violin
  - Karen Dreyfus – viola
  - Daniel Panner – viola
  - Robert Rinehart – viola
  - Mina Smith – cello
  - Alan Stepansky – cello

== Charts ==
Weekly chart performance for "We Take Care of Our Own"
Chart (2012)	Peak position
Belgium (Ultratip Bubbling Under Flanders)	14
Belgium (Ultratip Bubbling Under Wallonia)	15
Denmark Airplay (Tracklisten)	12
Ireland (IRMA)	41
Italy (Musica e Dischi)	29
Japan Hot 100 (Billboard)	29
Netherlands (Single Top 100)	73
Spain (Promusicae)	14
US Bubbling Under Hot 100 (Billboard)	6
US Adult Alternative Airplay (Billboard)	11
US Hot Rock & Alternative Songs (Billboard)	43
