= The Summit, Houston, TX December 8, 1978 =

Live album by Bruce Springsteen and the E Street Band
- Released: September 2017
- Recorded: December 8, 1978
- Genre: Rock
- Label: http://live.brucespringsteen.net
- Producer: Bruce Jackson

Bruce Springsteen and the E Street Band chronology
| Auditorium Theatre, Rochester, NY 1977 (2017) | The Summit, Houston, TX December 8, 1978 (2017) | Springsteen on Broadway (2018) |

The Summit, Houston, TX December 8, 1978 is a live album by Bruce Springsteen and the E Street Band, released in September 2017, and is the 19th official release through the Bruce Springsteen Archives. The show was recorded on December 8, 1978, at The Summit in Houston, TX during the Darkness on the Edge of Town Tour.

All proceeds from this release will go to MusiCares Hurricane Relief Fund for Hurricane Harvey.

A DVD/Blu-ray of this show was released in 2010 as part of The Promise: The Darkness on the Edge of Town Story box set, but audio of the performance was not officially available until the release of this album. It is available on CD and digital download.

== Track listing ==
All tracks by Bruce Springsteen, except where noted.

- Set One
1. "Badlands" – 4:44
2. "Streets of Fire" – 5:35
3. "It's Hard to Be a Saint in the City" – 4:43
4. "Darkness on the Edge of Town" – 4:27
5. "Spirit in the Night" – 7:01
6. "Independence Day" – 6:17
7. "The Promised Land" – 5:19
8. "Prove It All Night" – 11:48
9. "Racing in the Street" – 8:57
10. "Thunder Road" – 6:15
11. "Jungleland" – 10:23
- Set Two
1. "The Ties That Bind" – 4:04
2. "Santa Claus is Coming to Town" (John Frederick Coots and Haven Gillespie) – 4:59
3. "The Fever" – 8:16
4. "Fire" – 3:23
5. "Candy's Room" – 3:22
6. "Because the Night" – 8:24
7. "Point Blank" – 8:03
8. "She's the One" – 11:57 *Includes snippets of "Mona" (McDaniel), originally recorded by Bo Diddley, and original songs "Preacher's Daughter" and "I Get Mad"
9. "Backstreets" – 8:57
10. "Rosalita (Come Out Tonight)" – 11:43
11. "Born to Run" – 4:47
12. "Detroit Medley" – 9:23 *"Devil With a Blue Dress On" (Stevenson/Long) Originally recorded by Mitch Ryder and the Detroit Wheels/"See See Rider" (Rainey/Lena Arant) Originally recorded by Ma Rainey/*"Good Golly Miss Molly" (Blackwell/Marascalco) Originally recorded by Little Richard/*"Jenny Take a Ride" (Crewe/Johnson/Penniman) Originally recorded by Mitch Ryder and the Detroit Wheels
13. "Tenth Avenue Freeze-Out" – 4:09
14. "You Can't Sit Down" (Dee Clark, Kal Mann, Cornell Muldrow) – 3:12 *Originally recorded by The Dovells
15. "Quarter to Three" (Gene Barge, Frank Guida, Joseph Royster) – 4:19 *Originally recorded by Gary U.S. Bonds

== Personnel ==
- Bruce Springsteen – lead vocals, guitars, harmonica
- Roy Bittan – piano, background vocals
- Clarence Clemons – saxophone, percussion, background vocals
- Danny Federici – organ
- Garry Tallent – bass guitar
- Steven Van Zandt – guitars, background vocals
- Max Weinberg – drums
