= Darkness Tour =

1978–79 concert tour by Bruce Springsteen

- Tour by Bruce Springsteen and the E Street Band
- Associated album: Darkness on the Edge of Town
- Start date: May 23, 1978
- End date: January 1, 1979
- Legs: 1
- No. of shows: 115

Bruce Springsteen and the E Street Band concert chronology
- Born to Run tours (1974–77); Darkness Tour (1978–79); The River Tour (1980–81)

Bruce Springsteen and the E Street Band's Darkness Tour was a concert tour of North America that ran from May 1978 through the rest of the year, in conjunction with the release of Springsteen's album Darkness on the Edge of Town. Like most Springsteen tours it had no official name; while this is the most commonly used, it is also sometimes referred to as the Darkness on the Edge of Town Tour or most simply the 1978 Tour.

The tour has since become viewed as perhaps Springsteen's best in a storied career of concert performances. Biographer Dave Marsh wrote in 1987, "The screaming intensity of those '78 shows are part of rock and roll legend in the same way as Dylan's 1966 shows with the Band, the Rolling Stones' tours of 1969 and 1972, and the Who's Tommy tour of 1969: benchmarks of an era."

== Itinerary ==
The tour ran in one continuous motion, starting May 23, 1978 at Shea's Buffalo in Buffalo, New York and playing halls, theatres, and occasional arenas across the United States and back several times, with a couple of forays into Canada. The first eight shows were played before the Darkness album was released on June 2. Big cities, secondary cities, and college towns were all visited. A few shows were cancelled due to sickness but were made up later in the run. The tour wrapped up, after 115 shows, on New Year's Day 1979 in Cleveland, Ohio's Richfield Coliseum.

After a brief, unpleasant 1975 touring experience in Europe after the release of Born to Run, and with the weaker commercial appeal of Darkness compared to its predecessor, Springsteen did not venture overseas on this tour.

== The show ==
The 1978 shows were longer than in previous Springsteen tours, typically around 25 songs, but they were not yet the marathon concerts that would occupy the River and Born in the U.S.A. Tours. The set list variety among Springsteen songs was not as great as on later tours, as his career was not yet long enough to offer the old rarities surprises of the Reunion Tour and those that followed.

Rather, the word that almost every account of the 1978 shows uses, is intense. "Badlands" often opened, with the verses being taken at a much faster pace than in the studio, with drumming more active, and with Springsteen fairly spitting out the lyrics nearly ahead of the band's ability to keep up. "Born to Run" near the end of the show was also done at breakneck speed. In contrast, slower numbers such as "Streets of Fire" were taken even more slowly, with ghostly organ lines set off against Springsteen's growling-to-screaming vocals.

Many new Springsteen songs appeared. Some were songs that were or soon would be big hits for others, such as "Fire" and "Because the Night". Two new slow numbers that were immediately accessible and especially effective were aching family saga "Independence Day" and the nightmare "Point Blank", both of which would later appear on the 1980 The River album, as would several other songs first heard sporadically in 1978.

Especially notable were some of the treatments of his most famous songs. "Prove It All Night", the failed first single from Darkness, was reshaped into an eleven-minute epic with a long, howling guitar-over-piano introduction and a frenetic organ-and-guitar-over-drums outro; this rendition would become a fan favorite still referred back to decades later. "Racing in the Street"'s piano outro was surprise-segued into the piano intro to "Thunder Road". On Born to Run, "Backstreets" was already a six-and-a-half minute epic tale of betrayal and loss that critic Greil Marcus had likened to The Iliad; now it was extended to eleven to thirteen minutes by way of a long, mostly soft piano-based interpolation variously known as "Baby I remember you", "Little girl don't cry" or "Sad eyes"; on some recordings the audience can be heard squealing as the emotional drama plays out, before the tempo rises, suddenly stops, and the "Hiding on the ba-ack-streets" coda kicks back in full force. This interlude would later be used as the basis for part of "Drive All Night" on The River, but for many fans, in this extended 1978 "Backstreets" Springsteen had found the height of his performance artistry.

Throughout, the E Street Band had a powerful but almost sparse sound, with each instrument's role clearly delineated (as members were added in the 1990s and 2000s the band's sound would become bigger but lose this clarity). In particular, Roy Bittan's piano was the musical keystone of many of the numbers.

Of course not everything in the show was moody. The third number played was nearly always the seriocomic, crowd-involving "Spirit in the Night", and towards the end of the shows things lightened up considerably with set closer "Rosalita (Come Out Tonight)" and encores including Springsteen's classic R&B "Detroit Medley" frolic and James Brown-styled antics during Gary U.S. Bonds' party dance anthem "Quarter to Three". Springsteen's on-stage raps and stories became a little more honest than before, with his trademark "goddamn guitar" story about the bitter conflicts with his father leavened by a hint of embrace (especially when a family member was present).

The tour also saw Springsteen headlining full-sized arenas for the first time (including New York City's Madison Square Garden), a move that he agonized over lest the increase in scale undermine his control over the audience. The shows still translated in the larger venues, and Springsteen would play in arenas or sometimes even stadiums for decades to come.

== Songs performed ==
Originals

Greetings from Asbury Park, New Jersey

- "For You"
- "Growin' Up"
- "It's Hard to Be a Saint in the City"
- "Lost in the Flood"
- "Spirit in the Night"

The Wild, the Innocent & the E Street Shuffle

- "4th of July, Asbury Park (Sandy)"
- "The E Street Shuffle"
- "Incident on 57th Street"
- "Kitty's Back"
- "Rosalita (Come Out Tonight)"

Born to Run

- "Backstreets"
- "Born to Run"
- "Jungleland"
- "Meeting Across the River"
- "Night"
- "She's the One"
- "Tenth Avenue Freeze-Out"
- "Thunder Road"

Darkness on the Edge of Town

- "Adam Raised a Cain"
- "Badlands"
- "Candy's Room"
- "Darkness on the Edge of Town"
- "Factory"
- "The Promised Land"
- "Prove It All Night"
- "Racing in the Street"
- "Something in the Night"
- "Streets of Fire"

Other

- "Because the Night"
- "Drive All Night"
- "The Fever"
- "Fire"
- "Independence Day"
- "Paradise by the "C""
- "Point Blank"
- "The Promise"
- "Ramrod"
- "Rendezvous"
- "The River"
- "Sad Eyes"
- "Sherry Darling"
- "The Ties That Bind"

Cover songs

- "A Whole Lotta Shakin' Goin' On "
- "Around and Around"
- "Auld Lang Syne"
- "Chimes of Freedom"
- "Detroit Medley"
- "Double Shot (Of My Baby's Love)"
- "Gloria"
- "Good Rockin' Tonight"
- "Heartbreak Hotel"
- "High School Confidential"
- "Honky Tonk"
- "I Fought the Law"
- "I Heard That Lonesome Wind Blow"
- "It's My Life"
- "Louie Louie"
- "Lucille"

- "Mona"
- "Night Train"
- "Not Fade Away"
- "Oh, Boy!"
- "Pretty Flamingo"
- "Quarter to Three"
- "Raise Your Hand"
- "Rave On"
- "Ready Teddy"
- "Runaround Sue"
- "Santa Claus Is Coming to Town"
- "Sea Cruise"
- "Summertime Blues"
- "Sweet Little Sixteen"
- "The Last Time"
- "Twist and Shout"
- "You Can't Sit Down"

== Critical and commercial reception ==
According to the unofficial fan website Brucebase, most of the shows on the tour were sell-outs or near sell-outs; only a handful had substantial numbers of empty seats, including one in Kalamazoo, Michigan where Springsteen offered to compensate the promoter for any financial loss. According to Lynn Goldsmith, tour photographer and Springsteen's girlfriend at the time, there were more than a few half-full venues, but Springsteen's performance level never varied no matter how many were there to watch.

Los Angeles Times critic Robert Hilburn wrote, "I realized the faith I was beginning to put in Springsteen the December day in 1978 that I drove 400 miles to Tucson, Arizona, to see him in concert [for personal reasons, not as a professional assignment]. The show was part of a short western swing near the end of the Darkness tour that skipped Los Angeles.... [a] swell of emotion came to me during Bruce's concert in Tucson ... seeing Springsteen push himself so hard on stage and listening to the eloquence of his songs made me forget about doubts and think about my own dreams again."

Lynn Goldsmith later said that the 1978 Tour was far from the stereotypical rock tour, and compared it to The Rolling Stones' 1978 American Tour which she had also covered: "With Bruce, it was no drugs, no drinking, [long] sound checks and [long] shows. With the Stones, it was no sound check, lots of parties and running off-stage as quickly as possible to catch the private plane.... During that tour, Bruce didn't have any money, period. Instead of hanging out at discos after shows, he'd just as likely pass the time by playing pinball or watching the landscape roll by from the back of the bus."

Author Dolan called it "one of the most legendary tours" in rock history, while the staff of Ultimate Classic Rock said the tour solidified Springsteen and the E Street Band as "one of the most exciting live acts in rock 'n' roll".

== Broadcasts and recordings ==
Live radio broadcasts help spread the reputation of the 1978 Tour.

One of the reasons the 1978 Tour is so well-remembered, and often viewed as the peak of Springsteen and the E Street Band in concert, is that several complete shows were broadcast live on album-oriented rock radio stations. These included the July 7 show at West Hollywood's The Roxy, broadcast on KMET; the August 9 show at Cleveland's Agora Ballroom, broadcast on WMMS and seven other Midwestern stations; the September 19 show at the Capitol Theatre in Passaic, New Jersey, broadcast on WNEW-FM; the September 30 show from the Fox Theatre in Atlanta, broadcast on about 20 Southeastern stations; and the December 15 show from the Winterland Ballroom in San Francisco, broadcast on KSAN-FM. These broadcasts, mixed by Jimmy Iovine, were of very high audio quality, and were heard at the time by a much larger audience than had attended the concerts. Over the years the stations would play the broadcasts again, and many high-quality bootlegs of these shows were recorded and circulated.

A syndicated radio interview with New York disc jockey Dave Herman also included live excerpts from a July 1 Berkeley Community Theatre show, including the long "Prove It All Night"; these clips would also be heard on other radio promotional vehicles such as the King Biscuit Flower Hour.

In addition, in the early 1980s a long music video for "Rosalita" was released to MTV, from the July 8 show on this tour (filmed in its entirety) at the Arizona Veterans Memorial Coliseum in Phoenix, Arizona, that included band introductions and numerous adoring women rushing the stage. It captured the energetic and playful side of Springsteen and the E Street Band in concert, and was the first such introduction many casual fans had. This was later included in the 1989 release Video Anthology / 1978-88.

The 1986 Live/1975-85 box set contained nine selections from the 1978 Tour, but fans were generally dissatisfied with them, as the "Backstreets" interlude was edited out, other raps and stories were edited or spliced together from different shows, and the long "Prove It All Night" was missing altogether. Additionally, a few of the tracks from the tour contained overdubs recorded at the Hit Factory during 1986.

In 2006, Springsteen manager Jon Landau indicated that a full-length filmed concert DVD from the Darkness Tour might be in the offing, following a similar release for a 1975 Born to Run tour show. Fans speculated heavily about such a possibility. It finally materialized in November 2010 with the release of The Promise: The Making of "Darkness On the Edge of Town", an elaborate box set that included a DVD containing a house recording of the full December 8, 1978, show from Houston's The Summit arena.

Various live recordings of every track from the Darkness album, and additional material from the period, were released on streaming services in June 2023 to mark the 45th anniversary of the album.

Several shows have been released as part of the Bruce Springsteen Archives:

- Berkeley, July 1, 1978 released on June 18, 2021
- The Roxy, July 7, 1978 released on July 6, 2018
- The Agora, Cleveland 1978 released on December 23, 2014
- September 19, 1978 (Capitol Theatre, Passaic, NJ), released on September 6, 2019
- Capitol Theatre, Passaic, NJ, September 20, 1978 released on December 22, 2017
- September 21, 1978 released on March 8, 2024
- September 30, 1978 (Fox Theatre, Atlanta, GA) released on October 9, 2020
- Atlanta, Oct 1, 1978 released on October 7, 2022
- The Summit, Houston, TX December 8, 1978 released on September 21, 2017
- Winterland 12/15/78 released on December 20, 2019
- Winterland 12/16/78 released on December 20, 2019

== Personnel ==
- Bruce Springsteen – lead vocals, guitars, harmonica
- Roy Bittan – piano, background vocals
- Clarence Clemons – saxophone, percussion, background vocals, clarinet
- Danny Federici – organ, electronic glockenspiel, accordion
- Garry Tallent – bass guitar
- Steven Van Zandt – guitars, background vocals
- Max Weinberg – drums

== Tour dates ==
Date	City	Country	Venue	Attendance	Revenue
May 23, 1978	Buffalo	United States	Shea's Buffalo Theater	3,187 / 3,187	$23,200
May 24, 1978	Albany	United States	Palace Theatre		
May 26, 1978	Philadelphia	United States	The Spectrum		
May 27, 1978	Philadelphia	United States	The Spectrum		
May 29, 1978	Boston	United States	Boston Music Hall		
May 30, 1978	Boston	United States	Boston Music Hall		
May 31, 1978	Boston	United States	Boston Music Hall		
June 2, 1978	Annapolis	United States	Halsey Field House		
June 3, 1978	Uniondale	United States	Nassau Veterans Memorial Coliseum		
June 5, 1978	Toledo	United States	Toledo Sports Arena		
June 6, 1978	Indianapolis	United States	Indiana Convention Center	2,014 / 6,000	$15,015
June 8, 1978	Madison	United States	Dane County Memorial Coliseum	4,739 / 9,000	$33,420
June 9, 1978	Milwaukee	United States	MECCA Arena		
June 10, 1978	Bloomington	United States	Metropolitan Sports Center	6,428 / 13,000	$44,966
June 13, 1978	Iowa City	United States	Hancher Auditorium	2,568 / 2,568	$20,177
June 14, 1978	Omaha	United States	Civic Auditorium Music Hall	2,518 / 2,518	$18,455
June 16, 1978	Kansas City	United States	Memorial Hall	2,777 / 2,777	$20,828
June 17, 1978	St. Louis	United States	Kiel Auditorium	4,516 / 10,000	$33,662
June 20, 1978	Morrison	United States	Red Rocks Amphitheatre	6,315 / 6,315	$49,824
June 23, 1978	Portland	United States	Paramount Theatre		
June 24, 1978	Portland	United States	Paramount Theatre	2,504 / 2,504	$19,627
June 25, 1978	Seattle	United States	Paramount Theatre	2,976 / 2,976	$22,677
June 26, 1978	Vancouver	Canada	Queen Elizabeth Theatre		
June 29, 1978	San Jose	United States	San Jose Center for the Performing Arts	2,463 / 2,463	$19,082
June 30, 1978	Berkeley	United States	Berkeley Community Theatre	3,475 / 3,483	$23,959
July 1, 1978	Berkeley	United States	Berkeley Community Theatre	3,483 / 3,483	$24,018
July 5, 1978	Inglewood	United States	The Forum	12,723 / 12,723	$101,472
July 7, 1978	West Hollywood	United States	Roxy Theatre		
July 8, 1978	Phoenix	United States	Veterans Memorial Coliseum	7,783 / 12,000	$56,059
July 9, 1978	San Diego	United States	San Diego Sports Arena	6,339 / 12,000	$40,082
July 12, 1978 (Note: Originally scheduled to take place at the Dallas Convention Center Arena.)	Dallas	United States	Dallas Convention Center Theater	1,761 / 1,761	$12,327
July 14, 1978	San Antonio	United States	Municipal Auditorium	3,152 / 5,000	$23,583
July 15, 1978	Houston	United States	Sam Houston Coliseum	9,012 / 9,012	$66,999
July 16, 1978	New Orleans	United States	Municipal Auditorium	5,000 / 5,000	$35,644
July 18, 1978	Jackson	United States	Jackson Municipal Auditorium	2,283 / 2,283	$17,123
July 19, 1978	Memphis	United States	Dixon-Myers Hall		
July 21, 1978	Nashville	United States	Nashville Municipal Auditorium		
July 28, 1978	Miami	United States	Jai Alai Fronton		
July 29, 1978	St. Petersburg	United States	Bayfront Center Arena		
July 31, 1978	Columbia	United States	Township Auditorium		
August 1, 1978	Charleston	United States	Gaillard Municipal Auditorium		
August 2, 1978	Charlotte	United States	Charlotte Coliseum		
August 4, 1978	Charleston	United States	Charleston Civic Center		
August 5, 1978	Louisville	United States	Louisville Gardens	4,000 / 5,000	$28,328
August 7, 1978	Kalamazoo	United States	Wings Stadium		
August 9, 1978	Cleveland	United States	The Agora		
August 10, 1978	Rochester	United States	Rochester Community War Memorial	5,984 / 10,000	$42,729
August 12, 1978	Augusta	United States	Augusta Civic Center	5,892 / 5,892	$48,780
August 14, 1978	Hampton	United States	Hampton Coliseum		
August 15, 1978	Landover	United States	Capital Centre		
August 18, 1978	Philadelphia	United States	The Spectrum		
August 19, 1978	Philadelphia	United States	The Spectrum		
August 21, 1978	New York City	United States	Madison Square Garden		
August 22, 1978	New York City	United States	Madison Square Garden		
August 23, 1978	New York City	United States	Madison Square Garden		
August 25, 1978	New Haven	United States	New Haven Veterans Memorial Coliseum	9,586 / 9,586	$76,841
August 26, 1978	Providence	United States	Providence Civic Center	10,500 / 10,500	$82,568
August 28, 1978	Pittsburgh	United States	Stanley Theatre	3,489 / 3,489	$29,236
August 29, 1978	Pittsburgh	United States	Stanley Theatre	3,473 / 3,489	$29,034
August 30, 1978	Richfield Township	United States	Coliseum at Richfield		
September 1, 1978	Detroit	United States	Masonic Temple Theatre		
September 3, 1978	Saginaw	United States	Saginaw Civic Center		
September 5, 1978	Columbus	United States	Veterans Memorial Auditorium		
September 6, 1978	Chicago	United States	Uptown Theatre	4,381 / 4,381	$34,793
September 9, 1978	Notre Dame	United States	Athletic & Convocation Center	5,310 / 10,000	$38,996
September 10, 1978	Cincinnati	United States	Riverfront Coliseum	6,630 / 17,000	$49,090
September 12, 1978	Syracuse	United States	Syracuse Memorial Auditorium		
September 13, 1978	Springfield	United States	Springfield Civic Center	6,664 / 6,664	$53,217
September 15, 1978	New York City	United States	The Palladium		
September 16, 1978	New York City	United States	The Palladium		
September 17, 1978	New York City	United States	The Palladium		
September 19, 1978	Passaic	United States	Capitol Theatre	10,518 / 10,518	$85,791
September 20, 1978	Passaic	United States	Capitol Theatre	10,518 / 10,518	$85,791
September 21, 1978	Passaic	United States	Capitol Theatre	10,518 / 10,518	$85,791
September 25, 1978	Boston	United States	Boston Garden	11,000 / 11,000	$102,707
September 29, 1978 (Note: Rescheduled from July 22, 1978.)	Birmingham	United States	Boutwell Memorial Auditorium		
September 30, 1978 (Note: Rescheduled from July 23, 1978.)	Atlanta	United States	Fox Theatre	3,828 / 3,828	$32,538
October 1, 1978	Atlanta	United States	Fox Theatre	3,822 / 3,828	$32,487
November 1, 1978	Princeton	United States	Jadwin Gymnasium		
November 2, 1978	Landover	United States	Capital Centre		
November 4, 1978	Burlington	United States	Patrick Gym		
November 5, 1978	Durham	United States	UNH Field House		
November 7, 1978	Ithaca	United States	Barton Hall		
November 8, 1978	Montreal	Canada	Montreal Forum		
November 10, 1978	St. Bonaventure	United States	Reilly Center		
November 12, 1978	Troy	United States	RPI Field House		
November 14, 1978	Utica	United States	Utica Memorial Auditorium		
November 16, 1978	Toronto	Canada	Maple Leaf Gardens		
November 17, 1978	East Lansing	United States	Munn Ice Arena		
November 18, 1978	Oxford	United States	Millett Hall		
November 20, 1978	Champaign	United States	Assembly Hall		
November 21, 1978	Evanston	United States	McGaw Hall		
November 25, 1978	St. Louis	United States	Kiel Opera House	3,557 / 3,557	$29,380
November 27, 1978	Milwaukee	United States	MECCA Arena		
November 28, 1978	Madison	United States	Dane County Memorial Coliseum		
November 29, 1978	Saint Paul	United States	St. Paul Civic Center Arena		
December 1, 1978	Norman	United States	Lloyd Noble Center		
December 3, 1978	Carbondale	United States	SIU Arena		
December 5, 1978	Baton Rouge	United States	LSU Assembly Center	5,337 / 12,000	$40,027
December 7, 1978	Austin	United States	Special Events Center	9,197 / 15,000	$63,927
December 8, 1978	Houston	United States	The Summit	12,003 / 15,000	$98,925
December 9, 1978	Dallas	United States	Dallas Convention Center Arena	6,959 / 9,500	$44,951
December 13, 1978	Tucson	United States	Tucson Community Center Arena		
December 15, 1978	San Francisco	United States	Winterland Ballroom	10,800 / 10,800	$80,975
December 16, 1978	San Francisco	United States	Winterland Ballroom	10,800 / 10,800	$80,975
December 19, 1978 (Note: Rescheduled from December 18, 1978.)	Portland	United States	Paramount Theatre		
December 20, 1978	Seattle	United States	Seattle Center Arena		
December 27, 1978	Pittsburgh	United States	Stanley Theatre	6,962 / 6,962	$58,270
December 28, 1978	Pittsburgh	United States	Stanley Theatre	6,962 / 6,962	$58,270
December 30, 1978	Detroit	United States	Cobo Arena		
December 31, 1978	Richfield Township	United States	Coliseum at Richfield		
January 1, 1979	Richfield Township	United States	Coliseum at Richfield		

=== Cancelled dates ===
Date	City	Country	Venue
July 25, 1978	Jacksonville	United States	Civic Auditorium
July 26, 1978	Lakeland	United States	Lakeland Civic Center
August 8, 1978	Toronto	Canada	Ryerson Theatre
December 11, 1978	Boulder	United States	Macky Auditorium
