= Gotta Get That Feeling =

Single by Bruce Springsteen

Single by Bruce Springsteen and the E Street Band
- Released: April 16, 2011
- Recorded: December 7, 2010
- Genre: Rock
- Label: Columbia Records

"Gotta Get That Feeling" is a song by Bruce Springsteen from the 2010 outtakes compilation album The Promise. A two-song limited edition 10-inch 45-rpm vinyl single "Gotta Get That Feeling" / "Racing in the Street '78 (Live from the Carousel, Asbury Park)", consisted of the two live versions of the tracks from The Promise, and was released on April 16, 2011, exclusively for Record Store Day.

The performances captured were recorded on December 7, 2010, at The Carousel in Asbury Park, New Jersey and feature the last E Street Band performances by Clarence Clemons, who died in June 2011.

== Track listing ==
1. "Gotta Get That Feeling"
2. "Racing in the Street ('78)"

== Personnel ==
=== The E Street Band ===
- Bruce Springsteen – lead vocals, lead guitar, harmonica
- Roy Bittan – piano, vocals
- Clarence Clemons – saxophone, vocals
- Charles Giordano – organ, glockenspiel
- Garry Tallent – bass guitar
- Steve Van Zandt – rhythm guitar, vocals
- Max Weinberg – drums
