= The Promised Land (Bruce Springsteen song) =

Single by Bruce Springsteen

from the album Darkness on the Edge of Town
- B-side: "Streets of Fire"
- Released: October 13, 1978 (UK)
- Recorded: October 27, 1977, with overdubs December 1 and 27
- Studio: The Record Plant, New York City, New York
- Genre: Rock; folk rock; country rock
- Length: 4:28
- Label: Columbia
- Songwriter: Bruce Springsteen
- Producers: Bruce Springsteen, Jon Landau

Bruce Springsteen singles chronology
"Badlands" (1978)	"The Promised Land" (1978)	"Hungry Heart" (1980)

"The Promised Land" is a song by the American singer-songwriter Bruce Springsteen from his 1978 album Darkness on the Edge of Town. It was released as a single in the United Kingdom, backed by another song from Darkness on the Edge of Town, "Streets of Fire", the third single from the album after "Badlands" and "Prove It All Night". "The Promised Land" was also included on the compilation album The Essential Bruce Springsteen.

== Background ==
"The Promised Land" originated from an August 1977 trip to Utah and Nevada Springsteen took with photographer Eric Meola (who shot the Born to Run cover) and guitarist Steven Van Zandt. After flying to Salt Lake City and renting a red 1965 Ford Galaxie, the group set out towards Reno, Nevada; Meola looking for photo ops, and Springsteen to see some of the places he envisioned in his dreams. Springsteen "wanted to take every single side road that we could in Nevada", according to Meola. On the trip, they slept in the car, observed the desert landscape, and at one point got caught in a thunderstorm. Meola came back with a portfolio of photographs, some of which were used in 2010 for The Promise: The Darkness on the Edge of Town Story. Thirty days later, Springsteen came to the Record Plant with the words and music he had been working on since the trip, for a song called "The Promised Land". The band recorded three takes on September 30, 1977, then returned on October 27 with revised lyrics, completing the song after 20 takes. After mixing, Springsteen would change his mind at the last minute, ordering that Steve Van Zandt's guitar solo (which had been removed from the final mix) be put back in. Although the album had already been sent for mastering, the change was completed in time for the record's release on June 2, 1978.

== Lyrics and music ==
Like several other songs on Darkness on the Edge of Town, Springsteen had the chorus for "The Promised Land" before he was able to come up with the lyrics for the verses. The song's title pays homage to Chuck Berry's song "Promised Land". In Berry's song, the singer leaves his Virginia home to go to the "promised land" of California. Author Patrick Humphries considers Springsteen's song bleaker than Berry's. The singer has been working in his father's garage by day, and drives all night "chasing some mirage". The singer faces difficulties, but he is now ready to face them and committed to addressing them, instead of running away from them. He sings that "I've done my best to live the right way", but that has not eliminated his troubles. Now he will address his problems by blowing away anything "that ain't got the faith to stand its ground".

In the chorus, the singer sings that "I believe in a promised land." Different authors have different answers as to what the "promised land" represents. June Skinner Sawyers believes it means the American ideal or even America itself. Daniel Wolff noted that unlike Berry's promised land, in which one could obtain the American dream by going west to California, Springsteen's promised land is defined by what doesn't happen there: "you aren't 'lost or broken hearted,' your dreams don't 'tear you apart' and your blood doesn't 'run cold.'" Jimmy Gutterman remarked that the singer believes in his promised land despite a lack of evidence.

In the documentary The Promise: The Making of Darkness On the Edge of Town, Springsteen said the song is about "how we honor the community and the place we came from". In the same documentary Springsteen noted that elements of the song reflected his own situation when he wrote it. He was unable to record a new album due to a lawsuit, and felt weak, unable to do what he wanted and that he was letting down the other members of the band. The song reflects the sense of despair but also of resilience and determination and desire to transcend his limitations that he was feeling at the time. Ultimately, Springsteen suggested that the message of the song is the need to lose one's illusions of a life without limitations while holding onto a sense of the possibilities in life.

The lyrics of "The Promised Land" include a number of links to other Springsteen songs, particularly those on Darkness on the Edge of Town. The idea of the singer believing in something better despite a lack of evidence also occurs in "Badlands". Also like "Badlands", the protagonist of "The Promised Land" is prepared to take control. Like a number of songs from Darkness on the Edge of Town, including "Badlands", "Prove It All Night", "Racing in the Street", "Factory" and "Adam Raised a Cain", "The Promised Land" includes references to working and a working life. Like "Adam Raised a Cain" and non-Darkness songs such as "Pink Cadillac", "The Promised Land" incorporates biblical imagery. Sawyers notes that the possibility of violence implicit in the lyrics foreshadow the explicit violence in the lyrics of some of the songs on Springsteen's 1982 album Nebraska.

The music for "The Promised Land" is in the key of G major. It is based on five chords. Springsteen plays a harmonica solo at the beginning and end of the song. The song also incorporates guitar and saxophone solos. The opening harmonica solo is covered by the New Jersey band Titus Andronicus on their debut album The Airing of Grievances in the song "Joset of Nazareth's Blues".

== Critical assessment ==
Robert Christgau referred to "The Promised Land" as a model "of how an unsophisticated genre can illuminate a mature, full-bodied philosophical insight."

== Live performances ==
The song has been a staple of Springsteen's live shows since 1978, and has been included on several concert albums and videos. The live album Live/1975–85 includes a 1985 performance of "The Promised Land" from a concert in Los Angeles, California. A performance of the song from a 2003 concert in Barcelona is included on the Live in Barcelona video. A June 28, 2009, live performance in London from the Working on a Dream Tour was included on the London Calling: Live in Hyde Park DVD. The box set The Promise contains video of three live performances of "The Promised Land", a 2009 performance from the Paramount Theater in Asbury Park, New Jersey, without an audience, a 1978 performance from a concert in Phoenix, Arizona, and another 1978 performance from a concert in Houston, Texas. Darren Hanlon covered "The Promised Land" on Play Some Pool, Skip Some School, Act Real Cool. Eddie Vedder has also covered this song live.

Springsteen dedicated a January 17, 2026, performance of the song at the Light of Day Winterfest in New Jersey to Renée Good after she had been killed by an Immigration and Customs Enforcement agent in Minneapolis earlier that month.

== Charts ==
Chart (1978)	Peak position
UK Airplay Guide Top 100 (Record Business)	76

== Personnel ==
According to authors Philippe Margotin and Jean-Michel Guesdon, and the album’s liner notes:

- Bruce Springsteen – vocals, lead guitar, harmonica
- Roy Bittan – piano
- Clarence Clemons – saxophone
- Danny Federici – organ
- Garry Tallent – bass
- Steven Van Zandt – guitars
- Max Weinberg – drums
