= Energy (Pointer Sisters album) =

Studio album by the Pointer Sisters
- Released: October 24, 1978
- Studio: Studio 55 (Los Angeles, California)
- Genre: R&B, rock, soul
- Label: Planet
- Producer: Richard Perry

The Pointer Sisters chronology
Having a Party (1977)	Energy (1978)	Priority (1979)

Singles from Energy
- 1. "Fire" Released: October 2, 1978; 2. "Happiness" Released: March 1979

Energy is the fifth studio album by the Pointer Sisters, released in 1978 on the Planet label.

== History ==
After a brief split following sister Bonnie's departure from the group, a musically reinvented and recharged Pointer Sisters returned composed of Ruth, Anita and June. Their first album for Planet, this was also the first album produced by Richard Perry. The record spawned a number two pop smash (and gold-certified single) with a cover of Bruce Springsteen's "Fire". "Happiness" also scored on the US pop Top 40.

Energy became the group's first gold-certified release since 1974's That's a Plenty. The album was remastered and issued on CD with bonus tracks in 2009 by Wounded Bird Records.

== Critical reception ==
Professional ratings
Review scores
Source	Rating
AllMusic	3.5/5 stars
Christgau's Record Guide	B−
Music Week	3/4 stars
The Rolling Stone Album Guide	3.5/5 stars
Smash Hits	6/10

The Rolling Stone Album Guide praised "Fire" as an "absolute killer single."

== Track listing ==
Side one
No.	Title	Writer(s)	Length
1.	"Lay It on the Line"	Patrick Henderson, Wornell Jones	3:16
2.	"Dirty Work"	Walter Becker, Donald Fagen	3:33
3.	"Hypnotized"	Bob Welch	5:02
4.	"As I Come of Age"	Stephen Stills	2:42
5.	"Come and Get Your Love"	Russ Ballard	3:40

Side two
No.	Title	Writer(s)	Length
6.	"Happiness"	Allen Toussaint	4:19
7.	"Fire"	Bruce Springsteen	3:41
8.	"Angry Eyes"	Ken Loggins, Jim Messina	2:42
9.	"Echoes of Love"	Patrick Simmons, Willie Mitchell, Earl Randle	3:06
10.	"Everybody Is a Star"	Sylvester Stewart	3:15

2009 remastered bonus tracks
No.	Title	Writer(s)	Length
11.	"Love Is Like a Rolling Stone"	Jean Anne Chapman, Brian Cadd	3:34
12.	"If You Wanna Get Back Your Lady" (Dance Mix)	John Lewis Parker, Brian Potter	6:09
13.	"Happiness" (12" Version)		5:47

== Personnel ==
The Pointer Sisters

- Anita Pointer – lead vocals (2–4, 7, 9, 10), backing vocals, tambourine (5)
- Ruth Pointer – lead vocals (3–5, 10), backing vocals
- June Pointer – lead vocals (1, 3, 4, 6, 8, 10), backing vocals

Musicians

- David Paich – acoustic piano (1, 4, 6), electric piano (2, 3, 5, 10), organ (7), high piano (7)
- James Newton Howard – Hohner clavinet (3), synthesizers (3, 6, 9, 10), electric piano (4)
- Steve Porcaro – organ (4), synthesizers (9)
- Jimmy Phillips – organ (5), synthesizers (5), acoustic piano (8), organ (8)
- Jai Winding – acoustic piano (7)
- Danny Kortchmar – rhythm guitar (1, 5), electric guitar (3, 4), guitar (8, 10)
- Waddy Wachtel – lead guitar (1, 4, 5), electric guitar (2), slide guitar (3), guitar (6, 10)
- Fred Tackett – acoustic guitar (2), guitar (6, 8), rhythm guitar (9)
- Randy Bachman – acoustic guitar (3)
- Davey Johnstone – slide guitar (5), guitar (7), lead guitar (9)
- David Hungate – bass (1, 2, 5, 6, 8, 10)
- Eddie Watkins Jr. – bass (3)
- Mike Porcaro – bass (4)
- Gerald Johnson – bass (7)
- Abraham Laboriel – bass (9)
- Jeff Porcaro – drums (1, 3–6, 9, 10)
- Rick Jaeger – drums (2, 7)
- Mike Baird – drums (8)
- Lenny Castro – percussion (1, 9), tambourine (7)
- Richard Perry – percussion (8)
- Bryan Cumming – saxophone solo (2)

== Production ==
- Richard Perry – producer
- Dennis Kirk – recording engineer
- Bill Schnee – remix engineer
- Gabe Veltri – assistant engineer
- Doug Sax – mastering engineer at The Mastering Lab (Los Angeles, CA).
- Robin Rinehart – production coordinator
- Kathleen Carey – song coordinator
- Marylin Vance – fashion coordinator
- Kosh – design, art direction
- James M. Shea – photography

== Charts ==
=== Weekly charts ===
Weekly chart performance for Energy
Chart (1978–1979)	Peak position
Australian Albums (Kent Music Report)	21
Dutch Albums (Album Top 100)	1
New Zealand Albums (RMNZ)	38
US Billboard 200	13
US Top R&B/Hip-Hop Albums (Billboard)	9

=== Year-end charts ===
Year-end chart performance for Energy
Chart (1979)	Position
Dutch Albums (Album Top 100)	14
US Billboard 200	68

== Certifications ==
Certifications for Energy
Region	Certification	Certified units/sales
Canada (Music Canada)	Platinum	100,000^{^}
Netherlands (NVPI)	Platinum	100,000^{^}
United States (RIAA)	Gold	500,000^{^}
^{^} Shipments figures based on certification alone.
