= Happiness (Pointer Sisters song) =

Single by The Pointer Sisters

from the album Energy
- B-side: "Lay It on the Line"
- Released: March 1979
- Genre: Pop
- Length: 3:17 (Promo Version) 3:59 (Single Version) 4:19 (Album Version)
- Label: Planet
- Songwriter: Allen Toussaint
- Producer: Richard Perry

The Pointer Sisters singles chronology
"Fire" (1978)	"Happiness" (1979)	"He's So Shy" (1980)

"Happiness" is a song by The Pointer Sisters, written by Allen Toussaint, which was released in early 1979 as the second single from their 1978 LP, Energy.

"Happiness" was a top 40 hit in the U.S., Canada and New Zealand. It also reached No. 6 in The Netherlands in the Dutch Top 40 and No. 8 in Belgium.

== Charts ==
=== Weekly charts ===
Chart (1979)	Peak position
Belgium (Ultratop 50 Flanders)	11
Netherlands (Dutch Top 40)	6
Netherlands (Single Top 100)	11
New Zealand (Recorded Music NZ)	33
US Billboard Hot 100	30
US Dance Club Songs (Billboard)	18
US Hot R&B/Hip-Hop Songs (Billboard)	20
US Cash Box Top 100	28

=== Year-end charts ===
Chart (1979)	Position
Netherlands (Dutch Top 40)	51
Netherlands (Single Top 100)	67

== In popular culture ==
- The song was used in a montage scene in the 1997 crime drama film Donnie Brasco.
