= Badlands (song) =

Single by Bruce Springsteen

from the album Darkness on the Edge of Town
- B-side: "Streets of Fire" (US); "Something in the Night" (Germany); "Candy's Room" (France)
- Released: July 21, 1978
- Recorded: February 25, 1978 (completed)
- Studio: The Record Plant, New York City
- Genre: Rock; hard rock
- Length: 4:01
- Label: Columbia
- Songwriter: Bruce Springsteen
- Producers: Bruce Springsteen, Jon Landau

Bruce Springsteen singles chronology
| "Prove It All Night" (1978) | "Badlands" (1978) | "The Promised Land" (1978) |

"Badlands" is a song by the American singer-songwriter Bruce Springsteen, released as the second single from his fourth studio album Darkness on the Edge of Town in July 1978.

== Origins ==
According to Springsteen, he came up with the title "Badlands" before he started writing the song. He felt it was a "great title" but that it would be easy to blow it by not writing a worthy song for it.

The riff is based on the Animals' "Don't Let Me Be Misunderstood". According to the editors of Rolling Stone, the song "tapped into the ferocity of the punk singles he'd been listening to at the time".

== Themes ==
The song tells the story of a man down on his luck and angry at the world, who wants a better lot in life.

Baby, I got my facts

Learned real good right now
You better get it straight darlin’
Poor man wanna be rich
Rich man wanna be king
And a king ain't satisfied
'Til he rules everything
I wanna go out tonight

I wanna find out what I got

On March 15, 2012, in a keynote speech to an audience at the South by Southwest music festival, Springsteen discussed the Animals' influence on his music at length, praising their harsh, propulsive sound and lyrical content. Saying that Darkness on the Edge of Town was "filled with Animals", Springsteen played the opening riffs to "Don't Let Me Be Misunderstood" and his own "Badlands" back to back, then said, "Listen up, youngsters! This is how successful theft is accomplished!"

In Brian Hiatt's 2019 book, Bruce Springsteen: The Stories Behind the Songs, the finished first verse is said to lay out the "narrator's essential dilemma in a more sophisticated fashion than Springsteen had managed before, acknowledging larger forces at work". He is "caught in a crossfire", Springsteen taking significant lyrical inspiration from Elvis Presley's "King of the Whole Wide World" (particularly the words "A poor man wants to be a rich man/ A rich man wants to be a king"): a song which appeared in the 1962 United Artists film Kid Galahad and featuring, in its single master version, a strong saxophone performance by Boots Randolph.

== Instrumentation ==
The classic E Street Band sound is immediately present on "Badlands", as a brief drum intro kicks in to a powerful piano-and-electric guitar riff. The song is taken fast, with Max Weinberg's dynamic drumming; indeed it contains his most well-known beat, a one-two-three-four-five-six-(double time) one-two-three pattern underneath the verses. Late in the song a brief guitar break leads to a Clarence Clemons tenor saxophone part.

== Chart performance and reception ==
"Badlands" was not a commercial Top 40 success, only reaching number 42 on the Billboard Hot 100, even worse than the album's previous single "Prove It All Night". Cash Box called it "Springsteen at his best with organ backing, guitar work, romping beat and Clemons' sax solo." Record World said that "the message, and the delivery, is emotionally devastating." "Badlands" did achieve considerable progressive rock and album-oriented rock radio airplay at the time, and classic rock airplay since. The song has appeared on eight Springsteen releases: Darkness on the Edge of Town, Live 1975–85, the 1995 Greatest Hits, Live in New York City, Live in Barcelona, The Essential Bruce Springsteen, the Wal-Mart-only 2009 Greatest Hits, and Collection: 1973-2012.

Rolling Stone editors rated "Badlands" to be Springsteen's second-greatest song all time, behind only "Born to Run", and consider it to fit the definition of a rock anthem derived by The Who guitarist Pete Townshend, in that it is "praying onstage". According to contemporary musician Jackson Browne, "Badlands" is "cool and thrilling. There's an economy of language that comes in here. He's building a persona, a lexicon of references."

A lyric video for the song was released in May 2023. Neither Springsteen nor Columbia Records released a statement for the video's making, Russ Burlingame of ComicBook.com deduced it was due to the song's appearance over the end credits in the film Guardians of the Galaxy Vol. 3.

== Live performances ==
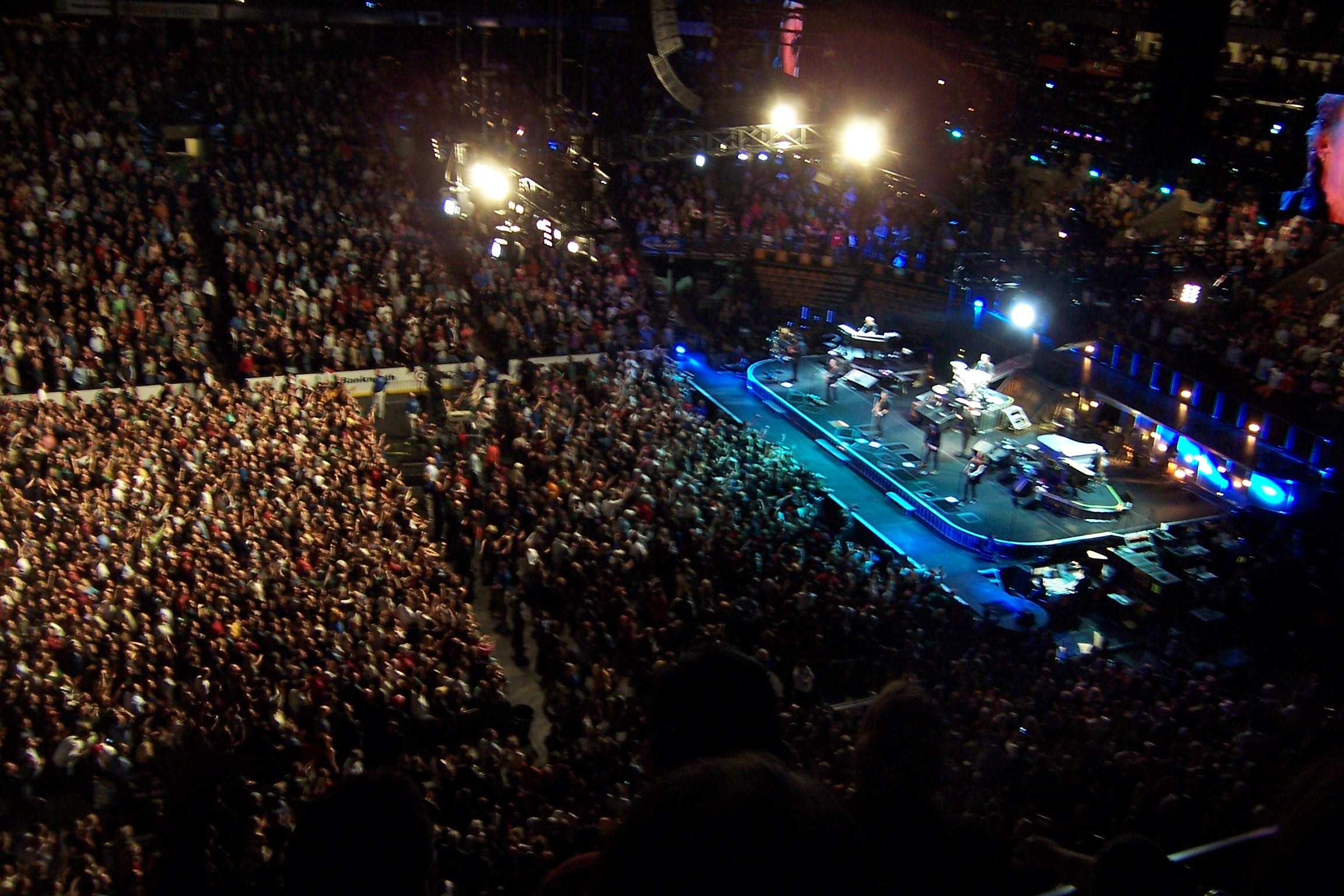
Throwing white lights onto the floor audience during the rousing choruses is a typical production element of live performances of "Badlands". Magic Tour main set closer, TD Banknorth Garden, Boston, November 18, 2007.

As evidenced by its appearance on three live offerings, "Badlands" has been a staple of Springsteen and E Street Band concert performances. It is Springsteen's fourth most played song in concert besides "Born to Run", "Thunder Road" and "The Promised Land". It opened shows on the 1978 Darkness Tour before the album had even been released, a slot it held for much of that tour (one such performance from Arizona Veterans Memorial Coliseum was filmed and released as a promotional video in the early 1980s). It was featured near or at the end of the first set during the 1980–1981 River Tour (one such performance from Arizona State University, famously introduced by Springsteen decrying the election of Ronald Reagan as president the night before, was included on Live 1975–85, less the intro), a spot it held for much of the 1984–1985 Born in the U.S.A. Tour until the stadium shows, when it was used to keep momentum going out of the opening "Born in the U.S.A.". "Badlands" was put on the shelf for most of the 1988 Tunnel of Love Express, a mark of how radically that tour sought to throw out stock show elements. Once the 1992–1993 "Other Band" Tour was underway, it was quickly added back in for some needed mid-first-set energy. Springsteen seemed to conclude it fit this role, as he kept it in the same "10 songs in" position during all of the 1999–2000 Reunion Tour and 2002–2003 Rising Tour shows, recapturing audience enthusiasm after less familiar material such as "Murder, Inc." or "Worlds Apart" were performed. On the 2007 Magic Tour, however, the shortened show time resulted in "Badlands" becoming even more prominent as the main set closer. For the 2009 Working on a Dream Tour, "Badlands" resumed its old role as the show opener; it stayed in that slot until the final two months of the tour—when Springsteen chose to play the Born to Run album in its entirety at a show, "Badlands" was usually shifted to be the final song of the main set, which the track "Born to Run" had previously held on the tour.

== Personnel ==
According to authors Philippe Margotin and Jean-Michel Guesdon, and the album's liner notes:

- Bruce Springsteen – lead vocals, lead guitar
- Roy Bittan – piano
- Clarence Clemons – saxophone, percussion, backing vocals
- Danny Federici – Hammond B3 organ
- Garry Tallent – bass
- Steven Van Zandt – rhythm guitar, backing vocals
- Max Weinberg – drums
