= The Promise (Bruce Springsteen album) =

Compilation album by Bruce Springsteen
- Released: November 16, 2010
- Recorded: 1977–1978, 2010
- Genres: Rock; heartland rock
- Length: 88:05
- Label: Columbia
- Producers: Bruce Springsteen, Jon Landau

Bruce Springsteen chronology
| Working on a Dream (2009) | The Promise (2010) | Wrecking Ball (2012) |

Bruce Springsteen and the E Street Band chronology
| Working on a Dream (2009) | The Promise (2010) | Wrecking Ball (2012) |

The Promise is a compilation album by the American singer-songwriter Bruce Springsteen, released November 16, 2010, on Columbia Records. The album is a collection of previously unreleased songs which were recorded during the Darkness on the Edge of Town sessions in 1977–1978, with some vocals and additional instrumentation overdubs recorded in 2010. It was released in 2CD and 3LP formats. The album is also available as part of the box set The Promise: The Darkness on the Edge of Town Story. The two-CD version of the release entered the UK Albums Chart at number 7. It had been in production for many years and was originally scheduled to be released for the 30th anniversary in 2008. The Promise debuted at number 16 on the Billboard 200, while the box set, The Promise: The Darkness on the Edge of Town Story, debuted at number 27.

The album features one of the last appearances of Clarence Clemons before his death in June 2011. Clemons is featured on the song "Save My Love", which was the only song on the album completely re-recorded by Springsteen and the E Street Band for the project.

== Promotion ==
On November 16, 2010, Springsteen performed "Because the Night" and "Save My Love" with Steven Van Zandt, Roy Bittan and the Roots on Late Night with Jimmy Fallon (along with a cover of Willow Smith's "Whip My Hair" with Fallon posing as Neil Young). Songs from the album were performed during Springsteen's Wrecking Ball Tour in 2012–2013.

== Critical reception ==
Professional ratings
Aggregate scores
| Source | Rating |
|---|---|
| Metacritic | 94/100 |
Review scores
| Source | Rating |
| AllMusic | 4.5/5 stars |
| Drowned in Sound | 8/10 |
| The Guardian | 5/5 stars |
| Mojo | 5/5 stars |
| musicOMH | 5/5 stars |
| Q | 4/5 stars |
| Paste | 9.2/10 |
| Pitchfork | 8.5/10 |
| PopMatters | 7/10 |
| Uncut | 5/5 stars |

Upon its release, The Promise received acclaim from most music critics. At Metacritic, which assigns a normalized rating out of 100 to reviews from mainstream critics, the album received an average score of 94, based on 17 reviews, which indicates "universal acclaim".

AllMusic gave it four and a half stars; they stated that, "The Promise stands on its own as a great Bruce Springsteen record; it feels finished, focused, and, above all, offers more proof that Springsteen is one of the greatest rock and pop songwriters" although stating that "The Promise" was the only track that might have added something to the original Darkness on the Edge of Town album. BBC Music had a favorable review and stated "The Promise is as compelling an advert for the Boss’s beautiful, blue-collar soul as you’re likely to find outside of the hits; an indispensable portrait of an artist at the top of his game."

== Commercial performance ==
The Promise debuted at number 16 on the Billboard 200. While not selling as well as his previous studio albums on the American charts, the set did well on the European charts (with first week worldwide sales of over 187,000 units), opening at No. 1 in Germany, Spain, and Norway. It also charted at No. 4 in The Netherlands, Denmark and Ireland, No. 5 in Austria, No. 7 in the United Kingdom and No. 9 in Switzerland.

== Track listing ==
All songs written by Bruce Springsteen, except where noted.

Disc One
| No. | Title | Writer(s) | Length |
|---|---|---|---|
| 1. | "Racing in the Street ('78)" | | 6:49 |
| 2. | "Gotta Get That Feeling" | | 3:17 |
| 3. | "Outside Looking In" | | 2:16 |
| 4. | "Someday (We'll Be Together)" | | 5:35 |
| 5. | "One Way Street" | | 4:19 |
| 6. | "Because the Night" | Springsteen, Patti Smith | 3:25 |
| 7. | "Wrong Side of the Street" | | 3:34 |
| 8. | "The Brokenhearted" | | 5:19 |
| 9. | "Rendezvous" | | 2:37 |
| 10. | "Candy's Boy" | | 4:38 |

Disc Two
| No. | Title | Length |
|---|---|---|
| 1. | "Save My Love" | 2:36 |
| 2. | "Ain't Good Enough for You" | 4:01 |
| 3. | "Fire" | 4:08 |
| 4. | "Spanish Eyes" | 3:50 |
| 5. | "It's a Shame" | 3:14 |
| 6. | "Come On (Let's Go Tonight)" | 2:18 |
| 7. | "Talk to Me" | 4:20 |
| 8. | "The Little Things (My Baby Does)" | 3:17 |
| 9. | "Breakaway" | 5:30 |
| 10. | "The Promise" | 5:52 |
| 11. | "City of Night" | 2:58 |
| 12. | "The Way" (hidden track) | 3:42 |

== Personnel ==
Adapted from the album's liner notes:

- Bruce Springsteen – lead vocals, guitars, harmonica
- Roy Bittan – piano
- Clarence Clemons – saxophone, percussion
- Danny Federici – organ, glockenspiel
- Garry Tallent – bass guitar
- Steve Van Zandt – guitar, harmony vocals, horn arrangement
- Max Weinberg – drums
- Bob Chirmside – bass on "It's a Shame"
- Jon Landau – drums on "It's a Shame"
- Barry Danielian – trumpet on "The Brokenhearted", "It's a Shame" and "Breakaway"
- Curt Ramm – trumpet on "The Brokenhearted", "It's a Shame" and "Breakaway"
- Rick Gazda – trumpet on "Talk to Me"
- Bob Muckin – trumpet on "Talk to Me"
- Stan Harrison – tenor saxophone on "The Brokenhearted", "It's a Shame", "Talk to Me" and "Breakaway"
- Ed Manion – baritone saxophone on "The Brokenhearted", "It's a Shame", "Talk to Me" and "Breakaway"
- Dan Levine – trombone on "The Brokenhearted", "It's a Shame" and "Breakaway"
- Richie "La Bamba" Rosenberg – trombone on "Talk to Me"
- David Lindley – violin on "Racing in the Street ('78)", "Come On (Let's Go Tonight)"
- Tiffeny Andrews – backing vocals on "Someday (We'll Be Together)" and "Breakaway"
- Corinda Carford – backing vocals on "Someday (We'll Be Together)" and "Breakaway"
- Michelle Moore – backing vocals on "Someday (We'll Be Together)" and "Breakaway"
- Antionette Savage – backing vocals on "Someday (We'll Be Together)" and "Breakaway"
- Patti Scialfa – backing vocals on "Someday (We'll Be Together)" and "Breakaway"
- Soozie Tyrell – backing vocals on "Someday (We'll Be Together)" and "Breakaway"

Technical

- Jon Landau, Bruce Springsteen – original tracks production
- Bruce Springsteen – additional production
- Jimmy Iovine, Toby Scott – recording
- Thom Panunzio, Rob Lebret – assistant engineers
- Bob Clearmountain – mixing
- Brandon Duncan – mixing assistant
- Bob Ludwig – mastering
- Ken Asher – string arrangement on "The Promise"
  - Toby Scott – recording project supervisor
  - Rob Lebret, Kevin Buell – assistants
- Kevin Buell – guitars support staff
- Harry McCarthy – drums support staff
- Shari Sutcliffe – musician contracts
- Toby Scott, Matt Kelly, Donna Kloepfer, Sean Brennan, Tim Sturgis – archive research, retrieval and restoration
- Eric Meola – photography
- Michelle Holme, Dave Bett – art direction

== Charts ==
=== Weekly charts ===
Weekly chart performance for The Promise
| Chart (2010–2011) | Peak position |
|---|---|
| Australian Albums (ARIA) | 22 |
| Austrian Albums (Ö3 Austria) | 5 |
| Belgian Albums (Ultratop Flanders) | 19 |
| Belgian Albums (Ultratop Wallonia) | 32 |
| Dutch Albums (Album Top 100) | 4 |
| European Albums (Billboard) | 2 |
| Finnish Albums (Suomen virallinen lista) | 9 |
| French Albums (SNEP) | 14 |
| German Albums (Offizielle Top 100) | 1 |
| Irish Albums (IRMA) | 4 |
| Italian Albums (FIMI) | 4 |
| New Zealand Albums (RMNZ) | 30 |
| Scottish Albums (Official Charts) | 6 |
| Spanish Albums (Promusicae) | 1 |
| Swedish Albums (Sverigetopplistan) | 1 |
| Swiss Albums (Schweizer Hitparade) | 4 |
| UK Albums (Official Charts) | 7 |
| US Billboard 200 | 16 |
| US Top Rock Albums (Billboard) | 3 |

=== Year-end charts ===
2010 year-end chart performance for The Promise
| Chart (2010) | Position |
|---|---|
| French Albums (SNEP) | 137 |
| German Albums (Offizielle Top 100) | 46 |
| Spanish Albums (PROMUSICAE) | 39 |
| Swedish Albums (Sverigetopplistan) | 7 |
| UK Albums (OCC) | 106 |

2011 year-end chart performance for The Promise
| Chart (2011) | Position |
|---|---|
| Swedish Albums (Sverigetopplistan) | 50 |
| US Billboard 200 | 200 |
| US Top Rock Albums (Billboard) | 38 |

== Certifications ==
Certifications and sales for The Promise
| Region | Certification | Certified units/sales |
|---|---|---|
| Denmark (IFPI Danmark) | Gold | 15,000^{^} |
| Germany (BVMI) | Gold | 100,000^{‡} |
| Ireland (IRMA) | Platinum | 15,000^{^} |
| Italy (FIMI) | Platinum | 50,000^{*} |
| Spain (Promusicae) | Gold | 30,000^{^} |
| Sweden (GLF) | Platinum | 40,000^{‡} |
| United Kingdom (BPI) | Gold | 100,000^{^} |
| United States (RIAA) | Gold | 250,000^{^} |
^{*} Sales figures based on certification alone.^{^} Shipments figures based on certification alone.^{‡} Sales+streaming figures based on certification alone.
