= Fire (Bruce Springsteen song) =

Song by Bruce Springsteen

"Fire" is a song written by Bruce Springsteen in 1977 which had its highest profile as a 1978 single release by the Pointer Sisters. The song was first released by Robert Gordon and Springsteen himself.

== Robert Gordon version ==
The song was first released by neo-rockabilly singer Robert Gordon, who had met Springsteen through E Street Band bass player Garry Tallent. They remained on friendly terms before Springsteen gave Gordon the song "Fire" after seeing a live gig by Gordon and Link Wray. According to Gordon, "it was a choice between 'Fire' and another new song but [Springsteen] decided to keep the other one for himself." Springsteen played piano on Gordon's recording which was released on Gordon's 1978 album Fresh Fish Special. Recorded in December of 1977 at Plaza Sound Studios in Manhattan, veteran rock 'n' roll producer Richard Gottehrer co-produced with Gordon.

Gordon's version received airplay on album-oriented rock radio stations, and his version of "Fire" spent 14 weeks in the Record World 101–150 Singles chart rising as high as no. 106 in September 1978.

== The Pointer Sisters version ==
"Fire"
- US single picture sleeve

Single by The Pointer Sisters

from the album Energy
- B-side: "Love Is Like a Rolling Stone"
- Released: October 2, 1978 (US)
- Recorded: 1978
- Genre: Rock; R&B; soul
- Length: 3:41 (album version); 3:28 (single version)
- Label: Planet/RCA
- Songwriter: Bruce Springsteen
- Producer: Richard Perry

The Pointer Sisters US singles chronology
"I Need a Man" (1978)	"Fire" (1978)	"Happiness" (1979)

Performance video
- "Fire" (TopPop, February 1979) by the Pointer Sisters on YouTube

The Pointer Sisters UK singles chronology
"Everybody Is a Star" (1979)	"Fire" (1979)	"Happiness" (1979)

=== History ===
The first single by the Pointer Sisters as the trio of Anita, June and Ruth Pointer, "Fire" was recorded for the group's November 1978 album release, Energy, with Anita Pointer on lead. Record producer Richard Perry had introduced the song to the Pointers by playing them a tape of Springsteen singing it, causing Anita Pointer to say: "It's too low for me: I guess you want Ruthie to sing it", to which Perry replied: "No – I want you to sing it." Knight Ridder music critic Christine Arnold cited "Fire" as "Energy's [main] highlight......Springsteen has created a song that might well have been done by the Ronettes in the '60s, and the Pointers inherit and develop the legacy nicely. Lyrically it's a simple song, but one that captures the indecision of a woman who wants and does not want a man all at the same time. And when the Pointers sing [the lyric] fire it's enough to sear your turntable."

Rising to No. 2 on the Hot 100 in Billboard magazine in February 1979 (behind Rod Stewart's "Da Ya Think I'm Sexy?"), "Fire" was eventually tied with "Slow Hand" (1981) as the Pointer Sisters' highest-charting single. A hit on Billboard's Hot R&B/Hip-Hop Songs and Adult Contemporary charts at No. 14 and No. 22 respectively, "Fire" also afforded the Pointer Sisters an international chart hit reaching No. 1 in Belgium, the Netherlands, South Africa and New Zealand, as well as charting in Australia (No. 7), Austria (No. 10), Canada (No. 3), West Germany (No. 35) and the UK (No. 34).

Anita Pointer later recalled, "['Fire'] became [the Pointer Sisters'] first gold single: we had had gold albums before but I didn't realize what a difference a gold single made, 'cause...that one song [is played] over and over all over the world. ['Fire'] really became a major hit for us and made a total difference in our career."

Billboard named the song No. 48 on their list of 100 Greatest Girl Group Songs of All Time.

=== Personnel ===
- Anita Pointer – lead & backing vocals
- Ruth Pointer – backing vocals
- June Pointer – backing vocals
- Davey Johnstone – guitar
- Gerald Johnson – bass
- Rick Jaeger – drums
- Lenny Castro – tambourine
- David Paich – organ, high piano
- Jai Winding – acoustic piano

=== Charts ===
==== Weekly charts ====
Chart (1978–1979)	Peak position
Australia (Kent Music Report)	7
Austria (Ö3 Austria Top 40)	10
Belgium (Ultratop 50 Flanders)	1
Canada Top Singles (RPM)	3
Canada Adult Contemporary (RPM)	1
Netherlands (Dutch Top 40)	1
Netherlands (Single Top 100)	1
New Zealand (Recorded Music NZ)	1
South Africa (Springbok)	1
UK Singles (OCC)	34
US Billboard Hot 100 debuted 11/11/1978	2
US Adult Contemporary (Billboard)	21
US R&B Singles (Billboard)	14
US Cash Box Top 100	2
US Record World Singles	2
West Germany (GfK)	35

==== Year-end charts ====
Chart (1979)	Rank
Australia (Kent Music Report)	43
Canada (RPM)	50
Belgium (VRT Top 30)	6
Netherlands (Dutch Top 40)	8
New Zealand (RIANZ)	20
South Africa (Springbok)	6
US Billboard Hot 100	15

=== Certifications ===
Region	Certification	Certified units/sales
New Zealand (RMNZ)	Platinum	30,000^{‡}
^{‡} Sales+streaming figures based on certification alone.

== Bruce Springsteen versions ==
"Fire"

Single by Bruce Springsteen and the E Street Band

from the album Live/1975–85
- B-side: "Incident on 57th Street" (live)
- Released: January 1987
- Recorded: December 16, 1978
- Venue: Winterland, San Francisco, California
- Genre: Rock
- Length: 2:58
- Label: Columbia
- Songwriter: Bruce Springsteen
- Producers: Bruce Springsteen; Jon Landau; Chuck Plotkin

Bruce Springsteen and the E Street Band singles chronology
"War" (1986)	"Fire" (1987)	"Brilliant Disguise" (1987)

Live video
- "Fire" (live in Houston, 1978) on YouTube

Live audio
- "Fire" (live in San Francisco, 1978) on YouTube

Studio audio
- "Fire" (from The Promise, 2010) on YouTube

Bruce Springsteen envisioned "Fire" as a song which could be recorded by his idol Elvis Presley. It was written after Springsteen saw Presley perform at a May 28, 1977 concert at the Spectrum in Philadelphia. Springsteen said, "I sent [Elvis] a demo of it but he died before it arrived."

Springsteen completed a studio recording of "Fire" on June 17, 1977, as one of 52 tracks which did not make the cut for his 1978 album Darkness on the Edge of Town as they were considered inconsistent with his thematic vision for the album. Springsteen's manager Jon Landau speculated Springsteen had a special concern that, if included on Darkness on the Edge of Town, "Fire" would be Columbia Records' single of choice despite not being representative of the album as a whole.

Despite his disinterest in releasing his own version of "Fire", Springsteen was reportedly upset when the Pointer Sisters version of the song reached no. 2 in February 1979. At that point Springsteen's most successful single remained "Born to Run", which had reached no. 23 in 1975. The Pointer Sisters were actually the second act to score a smash hit with a Springsteen cover, with Manfred Mann's Earth Band having taken "Blinded by the Light" to no. 1 in 1977. Additionally, "Because the Night" had been a no. 13 hit for Patti Smith in 1978, having begun as an unfinished Springsteen song which he originally meant to record himself. Springsteen finally scored his own inaugural top 10 hit in 1980 with "Hungry Heart", which was his first single release subsequent to the Pointer Sisters' success with "Fire" (Springsteen had in fact written "Hungry Heart" for the Ramones but was persuaded by his manager/producer Jon Landau that the song was the ideal vehicle to break Springsteen as a major singles artist).

With omission from the Darkness on the Edge of Town album notwithstanding, "Fire" was included in the set list of the Darkness Tour and has been a Springsteen concert staple since then. On the 1986 Springsteen concert album Live/1975-85, "Fire" is represented by a December 16, 1978 performance at Winterland in San Francisco. Issued as a single, this version of the song reached no. 45 on the Cashbox Top 100, no. 46 on the Billboard Hot 100, and also charted in Ireland (no. 18), Canada (no. 42), the UK (no. 54), and Australia (no. 82). The music video to promote the single was an acoustic performance of the song by Springsteen at a Bridge School Benefit concert in 1986.

The studio version of "Fire" was first released on The Promise box set (with a rerecorded and overdubbed lead vocal from 2010), and a video version appeared on the associated The Promise: The Darkness on the Edge of Town Story as part of the Thrill Hill Vault Houston '78 Bootleg: House Cut DVD.

=== Certifications ===
Certifications for "Fire", Bruce Springsteen version
Region	Certification	Certified units/sales
Australia (ARIA)	5× Platinum	350,000^{‡}
^{‡} Sales+streaming figures based on certification alone.

== Other versions ==
Shakin' Stevens had a January 1979 UK single release with "Fire" serving as B-side to his remake of "Endless Sleep". In the Netherlands, the single was issued with "Fire" as the A-side and formatted with a picture sleeve, this Dutch pressing being valued at £200+ in 1987.

Robin Williams imitated Elmer Fudd singing “Fire” for his 1983 comedy album Throbbing Python of Love. For this abbreviated version of the song (officially titled “Elmer Fudd sings Bruce Springsteen”), Williams imitated Springsteen’s vocal stylings, even though Springsteen’s first recorded performance of “Fire” was not released until 1986. Williams said he had seen Springsteen perform the song live in concert in 1978.

Cher performed the song during the Love Hurts Tour in 1992.

Link Wray, rockabilly guitarist who played on the Robert Gordon version, released his own version on his 1997 live album Walkin' Down A Street Called Love. In 2001, contemporary jazz guitarist Chuck Loeb covered the song on his release In a Heartbeat.

Babyface and Des'ree recorded the song as a duet, and it was released as a single from the soundtrack to the 1997 romantic comedy film Hav Plenty.

The Danish soul and rocksinger Henning Stærk recorded the song on his live album One Night Stand in 1987. The album was recorded at the jazzhouse Montmartre and the song became a big hit for Henning Stærk.

Hong Kong pop star Leslie Cheung (張國榮) recorded a Cantonese-language cover of the song entitled ‘Forever 愛你’ (translated as Forever Love You, with lyrics by Richard Lam) for his 1989 album Final Encounter.
