= Adam Raised a Cain =

Song by Bruce Springsteen

Song by Bruce Springsteen

from the album Darkness on the Edge of Town
- Released: June 2, 1978
- Recorded: November 9, 1977 – February 17, 1978 (mixed February 15–17, 1978)
- Studio: Record Plant Studios (New York City)
- Genre: Hard rock, blues rock, punk rock
- Length: 4:32 (album version)
- Label: Columbia
- Songwriter: Bruce Springsteen
- Producers: Bruce Springsteen, Jon Landau

"Adam Raised a Cain" is the second track from Bruce Springsteen's fourth album Darkness on the Edge of Town.

== Composition and lyrics ==
The song is notable for its hard rock sound and lyrics that use biblical images to explain the relationship between a father and son (symbolised as Adam and his son, Cain).

Springsteen calls this song "emotionally autobiographical." The bitter but loving relationship between the father and son is similar to Springsteen's with his own father, Douglas. Springsteen once said: "Our actual relationship was probably more complicated than how I presented it. Those songs were ways that I spoke to my father at the time, because he didn't speak and we didn't talk very much."

In the 2010 documentary The Promise: The Making of Darkness on the Edge of Town, sound mixer Chuck Plotkin described Springsteen's instructions for how the jarring assault of this song should sound next to the more melodic tunes on Darkness. Springsteen told Plotkin to think of a movie showing two lovers having a picnic, when the scene suddenly cuts to a dead body. This song, the singer explained, is that body.

Springsteen and the E Street Band released a longer version of the song on their 1986 live album Live 1975–85.

== Use in the media ==
The song was used in the film Baby It's You, directed by John Sayles, who would also direct Springsteen's music videos for "Born in the U.S.A.", "I'm on Fire" and "Glory Days".

The song was used in the series finale of Sons of Anarchy, titled "Papa's Goods". Series creator Kurt Sutter originally wanted to use the song as a cover in the final episode of Season 3, but there were issues with licensing from Sony and Springsteen did not like the idea of a cover of his song. An agreement was finally reached for the song to be played in its original version for the series finale.

== Personnel ==
According to authors Philippe Margotin and Jean-Michel Guesdon, and the album's liner notes:

- Bruce Springsteen – vocals, lead guitar
- Roy Bittan – piano
- Clarence Clemons – percussion, backing vocals
- Danny Federici – Hammond B3 organ
- Garry Tallent – bass
- Steven Van Zandt – guitars, backing vocals
- Max Weinberg – drums
- The band – backing vocals
