= Racing in the Street =

1978 song by Bruce Springsteen

Song by Bruce Springsteen

from the album Darkness on the Edge of Town
- Released: June 2, 1978
- Recorded: July 2, 1977 – March 23, 1978
- Studio: Atlantic Studios and the Record Plant, New York
- Genre: Rock, heartland rock
- Length: 6:54
- Label: Columbia
- Songwriter: Bruce Springsteen
- Producers: Bruce Springsteen, Jon Landau

"Racing in the Street" is a song by the American singer-songwriter Bruce Springsteen from his 1978 album Darkness on the Edge of Town. In the original vinyl format, it was the last song of side one of the album. The song has been called Springsteen's best song by several commentators, including the authors of The New Rolling Stone Album Guide.

== History ==
Springsteen started writing "Racing in the Street", shortly after the New Year's Eve 1975 show at the Tower Theatre, Upper Darby, Pennsylvania, along with "Darkness on the Edge of Town" and "The Promise". However, due to legal proceedings with his former manager, recording sessions for his fourth album did not begin until June 1, 1977. According to a song list from May 1977, included in the notebook provided with The Promise: The Darkness on the Edge of Town Story box set, it was one of the "new songs" for his next album. Sony recording logs show it was first recorded on July 2, 1977 at Atlantic Studios, New York, NY, by Bruce alone at the piano. Under the working title "Dying in the Street", he sang, "Tonight tonight the strips just right, I wanna blow 'em all out of their seats, so come out now everyone And we'll go racing in the street, Yes come on out now little one and we'll go dying in the street, Yes come on out now everyone and we'll go dying in the street, Look at me it's true Baby what else can we do, Racing in the Streets..." According to studio records at both Atlantic and the Record Plant, eight days were devoted to "Racing in the Street" during August 1977, and with a final total of seventeen, the most spent working on any song during the sessions. On August 30 at the Record Plant, the tape that would be used on the Darkness on the Edge of Town album was completed. However, Springsteen was not finished with the song. In late November and early December, he spent five more days working on the "harp version", which circulated for years among bootleggers, and was finally released as "Racing in the Street '78" on The Promise: The Darkness on the Edge of Town Story. December 9, 1977 was the last day he would record "Racing", although he spent three more days mixing it, March 21–23, 1978.

== Structure ==
The song is a ballad that begins with a slow, graceful and elegant introduction by pianist Roy Bittan.

The narrator has a dead-end job, but his pride and joy is his 1969 Chevy that he built with his partner Sonny. The narrator races the car in the northeast states to win money gambling against similar racers. The first verse is accompanied only by piano and opens with the narrator singing that:

I got a '69 Chevy with a 396
Fuelie heads and a Hurst on the floor

Max Weinberg's drum rim taps signal a somewhat faster pace for the second verse. Midway through, Danny Federici's organ later joins in, combining to form what writer Robert Santelli termed "one beautiful, seamless sound". The organ entrance signals one of the lyric's main points, that the narrator divides the world into two types of people: those who "give up living / And start dying little by little, piece by piece," and those like himself who find something to live for, which in his case is going racing in the streets.

However, after an instrumental break the third verse unexpectedly takes place with again only piano behind it. The girlfriend, which the protagonist apparently won from a competitor in one of his races, does not share his dream of going racing in the streets. Instead, she "stares into the night with the eyes of one who hates for just being born." But the story ends on a possibly hopeful note, as the narrator attempts to find salvation in the closing lines:

Tonight my baby and me are gonna drive to the sea
And wash these sins off our hands.

Other views of the closing have been grimmer. In any case, the song concludes with a moving fugue-like instrumental coda with Bittan's piano, Federici's organ and Weinberg's drums intertwining.

The chord progression in the choruses and coda is I–IV–ii–IV in the key of F. Springsteen uses the technique of withholding the V chord, which is only heard during the piano introduction and during a later transition; by reducing the chord's influence, the sense of longing or desperation in the song is heightened.

"Racing in the Street" contains two clear homages: the title and chorus refer to Martha and the Vandellas' 1964 hit "Dancing in the Street", while the instrumental break after the second verse and chorus is an allusion to the Beach Boys' 1964 song "Don't Worry Baby", itself about the emotional aspects of drag racing. The song also inhabits the space established by other early 1960s works, such as Jan and Dean's "Dead Man's Curve" and various other Beach Boys works. Writer Jim Cullen sees as one of Springsteen's goals with the song to comment upon and reconnect certain elements of rock history. Structurally, the song is also influenced by Van Morrison's "Tupelo Honey". The organ refrain references "It's My Life", a song by the Animals that Springsteen has revered since adolescence.

== Themes and interpretations ==
Springsteen has said that this song commemorates the racing in the street that occurred on a little fire road outside his home base of Asbury Park, New Jersey. But the song is one of a number of Springsteen songs from the 1970s, such as "Born to Run" and "Thunder Road", that celebrate American men's desire for freedom from responsibility, as symbolized by the ability to drive to freedom in a fast car. The protagonist of "Racing in the Street" can be contrasted with the protagonist of Tracy Chapman's "Fast Car". The protagonist of "Racing in the Street" using his fast car as a means to escape the city and responsibility, while the protagonist of "Fast Car" is using her fast car to approach the city and responsibility.

The song plays off the American love of muscle cars during the late 1960s and into the 1970s. Automotive enthusiasts have debated whether 1969 Chevrolet models could be ordered, customized, or built to the exact specifications given in the song of a 396-cubic-inch Chevrolet big-block engine with Fuelie Heads and Hurst Performance shifter.

Another interpretation of the song is that it is a possible realization of the potential inherent in "Thunder Road". That song is a declaration of what the protagonist and his girlfriend are going to do; "Racing in the Street" is the reality of how they might end up. "Racing in the Street" is the first song in which Springsteen introduces the suffering woman. Rock has always had songs where women are won and lost as trophies in contests, but Springsteen treats that theme with much more compassion than usual in the genre. This perspective is amplified by writer Jeffrey B. Symynkywicz, who sees the romantic attachment formed in the story removing the protagonist from his perfectly constructed world of cars built to personal specification and no external commitments. Springsteen paints "a harrowing portrait of the toll depression takes" on the woman, but the protagonist is at least mature enough to realize he has to augment the challenges he takes on the street with the role of not letting the woman face her demons alone. While romanticization of the ordinary, anonymous Americans found in "Racing in the Street" is common in rock, Springsteen's detailed depiction of them in this song shows real understanding and compassion, perhaps due to his having lived among them.

Writer Greil Marcus sees "Racing in the Street" as picking up the characters of various Beach Boys songs fifteen years later in their lives, never finding anywhere else the freedom they found in their cars and driving forever towards a dead end that they could see but not wish away or reach. Rolling Stone's David Fricke echoes this view, saying it is "Springsteen's grim Darkness portrait of a generation racing to a dead end." Both the album's title track "Darkness on the Edge of Town" and "Racing in the Street", which is similarly set physically and which close the two album sides, are influenced by film noir, which further set the mood of the record. Writer Eric Alterman sees "Racing in the Street" as one of Springsteen's top-flight songs, and one of several on the Darkness album that helped establish its low-on-hype integrity and power, and thus cemented Springsteen's relationship with his fan base.

Science fiction writer William Gibson said in 2010 that "Racing in the Streets" had everything to do with the hacker Bobby Quine from Gibson's 1982 short story "Burning Chrome" and what he did for a living.

Springsteen biographer Dave Marsh has called the song "the line of demarcation separating casual Springsteen fans from the fanatics," with the former considering it yet another sign of Springsteen's car metaphor obsession taken to an extreme, while the latter consider it "maybe the best thing Springsteen has to give." Detractors have also referred to the song as plodding, especially in comparison to the dynamicism of the prior Born to Run album. The people in "Racing in the Street" are part of the central thematic development of Springsteen's cast of characters from Born to Run to Nebraska and beyond.

Springsteen has called "Racing in the Street" one of his favorite songs. The song has been highly praised by other artists, including Bob Dylan and Joe Strummer. It was disc jockey Richard Neer's favorite Springsteen song, and when New York station WNEW-FM finally gave up on its rock format in 1999, "Racing in the Street" was the last song Neer played.

== Live performance history ==
"Racing in the Street" was a regular feature of the set list during Springsteen's 1978 Darkness Tour. This began the practice of the band playing a much longer coda part after the lyrical section concluded. With the music almost gone, Weinberg would start tapping his drumstick, and the band would slowly begin a long instrumental build-up with Bittan's piano leading. Subsequently, guitars enter almost unheard, with soft, high-pitched figures adding overtones against the keyboard parts. Listening to it live and on bootleg recordings of radio broadcasts the following year, writer Greil Marcus said the performance of "Racing in the Street" following the tour's famed elongated presentation of "Prove It All Night" had captivated his attention and was "the only music I've felt scared to play, and scared not to." The 1978 performances of the song typically segued into "Thunder Road".

The song was also a regular during the 1980–1981 River Tour. Now the song was a standalone piece, typically eight minutes in length, with a coda that neither faded out like the studio recording or segued into another song, but rather built to a series of climaxes. A live version of the song from the tour, recorded in 1981 at Meadowlands Arena in New Jersey, was included on the 1986 box set Live/1975–85. Rolling Stone noted that in concert the song "draws its power from a deeper well, palpably accelerating with pensive desperation as Danny Federici's sorrowful organ clouds over Roy Bittan's ballerina piano figure."

During the 1984–1985 Born in the U.S.A. Tour, "Racing in the Street" was first in set list rotation with "Backstreets". Then, once "Rosalita" was dropped as the standard second-half main set closer, "Racing in the Street" often served in its stead for a while, although by the 1985 U.S. stadium leg it was gone. During its time as a set closer, Springsteen began telling a softly spoken story about a summer romance gone bad, set against a wistful synthesizer backdrop by Bittan. Then the song was played, but the coda's ending was routed into Springsteen telling the conclusion of the story, with the couple packing their bags and leaving for an unknown destination, after which Springsteen walked off the stage while the coda resumed for one time around. This version was not included on the Live/1975–85 set because it had not been performed during any of the shows that were professionally recorded.

The song virtually disappeared from Springsteen's concert repertoire in the following years, appearing just a few times on the 1995–1997 solo Ghost of Tom Joad Tour played on acoustic guitar (and usually accompanied by future E Street Band violinist Soozie Tyrell).

Beginning in 1999 with the Bruce Springsteen and the E Street Band Reunion Tour and the subsequent 2000s tours in the Reunion Era, "Racing in the Street" appeared intermittently, often rotating with "Backstreets", "Jungleland", and similarly long, intense songs in a late-in-main-set "epic" slot. These versions were often nine minutes long, with audiences cheering in anticipation of the coda. Tyrell's violin and sometimes Clarence Clemons' baritone sax were added to the mix, but the lead was still Bittan, playing coda sequences up to several crescendos, before playing a minor-key line that signalled the conclusion.

During the final Vote for Change concert in 2004, "Racing in the Street" was performed by Springsteen and the band with Jackson Browne sharing the vocals. Springsteen played it a number of times on solo piano during his 2005 Devils & Dust Tour. It returned in its full-band incarnation on subsequent tours beginning in 2007, including a lengthy 2009 version which appears on the DVD London Calling: Live in Hyde Park. Since the death of Clemons, the song has been performed only 46 times.

== Alternate 1978 version ==
Springsteen released his own alternate version, "Racing in the Street '78", on The Promise, his 2010 double CD and triple LP of outtakes from Darkness on the Edge of Town. Recorded in late November-early December 1977, almost three months after the Darkness version had been completed, it had circulated for years on bootlegs. For The Promise version, David Lindley's violin was overdubbed in 2010; the rest of the recording was vintage 1977, including Springsteen's vocal. This version has slightly different lyrics and a more uptempo, anthemic arrangement than the album version. In the opening verse, the protagonist's car is a 1932 Ford instead of a 1969 Chevy. In the final verse, the woman's "pretty dress" is torn, not her "pretty dreams". This version has been performed a few times live since its release, albeit usually with the original lyrics.

== Cover versions ==
"Racing in the Street" has been covered by several artists, including a countrified version by Townes Van Zandt from his 1993 album Roadsongs. Other artists who have covered the song include Emmylou Harris on her 1982 live album Last Date and Queen's Roger Taylor on his 1984 solo album Strange Frontier.

== Charts ==
"Racing in the Street" reached number one on radio airplay in Australia.

== Personnel ==
According to authors Philippe Margotin and Jean-Michel Guesdon:

- Bruce Springsteen – vocals, guitars, backing vocals (?)
- Roy Bittan – piano
- Clarence Clemons – maracas, tambourine
- Danny Federici – organ
- Garry Tallent – bass
- Steven Van Zandt – guitars (?), backing vocals(?)
- Max Weinberg – drums
